= Holy Rosary Hospital =

- U.S. National Register of Historic Places
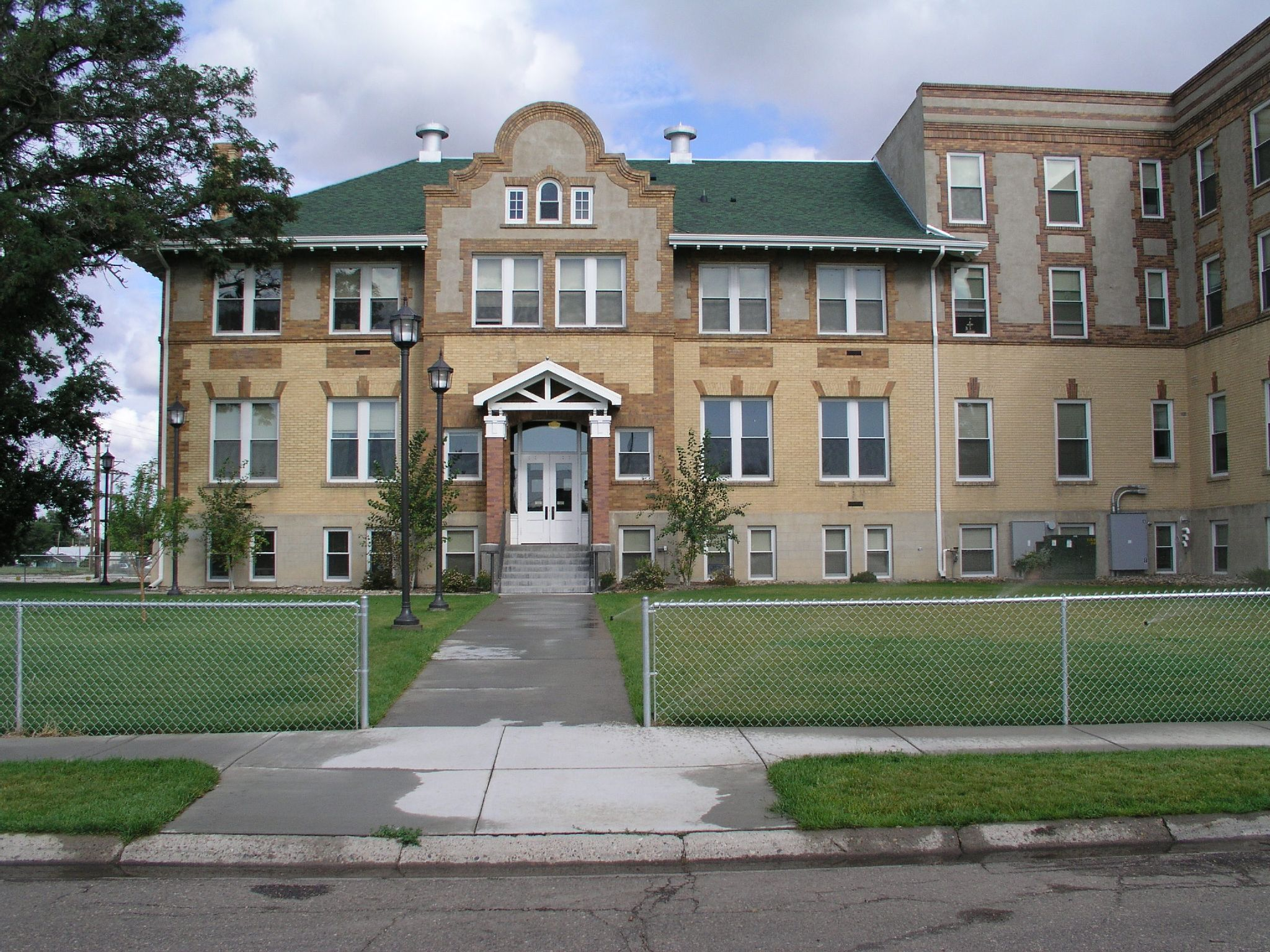
- Holy Rosary Hospital, 2009

- Location within Montana Location within the United States
- Location: 310 N. Jordan and 2007 Clark Street
- Coordinates: 46°24′39.7″N 105°50′7.94″W
- Architect: Link & Haire
- Architectural style: Late 19th and 20th Century
- NRHP reference No.: 08001324
- Added to NRHP: January 15, 2009

The Holy Rosary Hospital is located in Miles City, Montana, United States. The 1910 Holy Rosary Hospital, with its 1922 annex, is located on Clarke and Jordan Streets, northeast of Mile City's Main Street Historic District, and approximately 1/3 mile (0.54 km) east of the Ursuline Convent of the Sacred Heart. Tree-lined residential neighborhoods fringe the property to the south, while Leighton Avenue, a busy transportation corridor, defines its northern boundary.

The Holy Rosary Church underwent an extensive restoration and has been converted to low income housing. A nurses dormitory and a laundry, constructed in 1916, were located east of the hospital but were removed in 1964.

== Architecture ==
=== 1910 hospital ===
The original 1910 hospital is two stories, plus an attic and full daylight basement. It has a hipped roof with wide eaves supported by decoratively-carved rafter tails. Green asphalt shingles cover the roof, and large metal ventilators pierce the ridgeline. The north slope has a chimney made from Hebron brick at the corners and a corbelled top. Darker, red, polychromatic brick adorns the chimney's raised side panels. Two chimneys, similar to the chimney at the north slope, pierce the east slope of the 1910 building's roof. A Mission-style curvilinear parapet rises across the entry bay at attic level on the west (front) elevation, a hipped-roof dormer protrudes from the center of the north slope, and another hipped roof covers the central, protruding bay of the east elevation. The south elevation of the original building was modified when the 1922 annex was constructed.

=== 1922 annex ===
The 1922 annex is three full stories, plus a full daylight basement, and features a flat roof with a banded, straight parapet wall across its west, north, and south elevations. Throughout the exterior, the daylight basement level is finished with smooth concrete, the first story is Hebron brick, and the upper stories are concrete and brick. Polychromatic reddish brick quoining appears at the corners of the building above the basement level.
