= Hellgate Lodge 383 BPOE =

- U.S. National Register of Historic Places
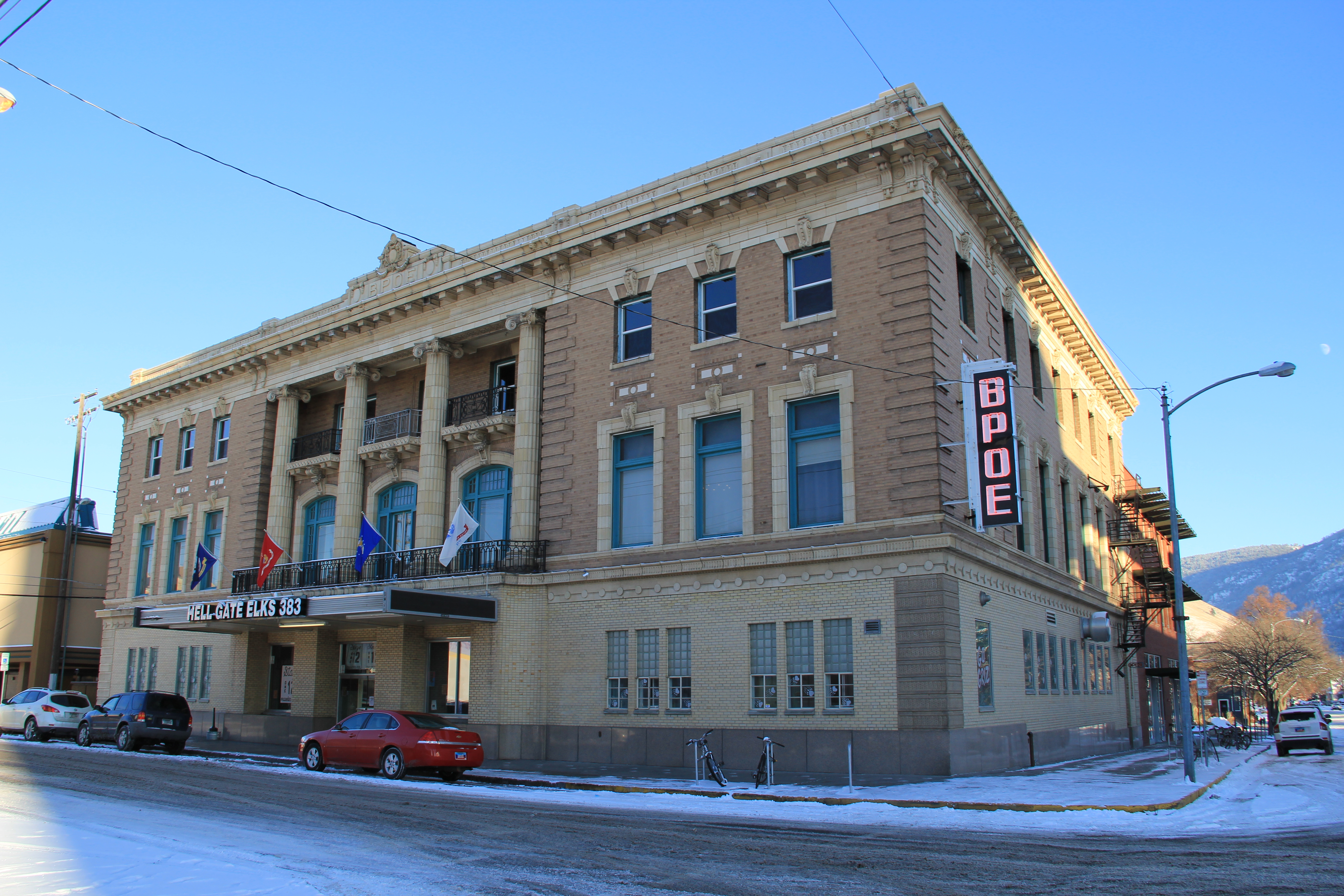
- Hellgate Lodge 383 BPOE viewed from Pattee St and Front St

- Location within Montana Location within the United States
- Location: 120 North Pattee Street, Missoula, Montana
- Coordinates: 46°52′12″N 113°59′36″W
- Area: less than one acre
- Built: 1911
- Architect: Link & Haire
- Architectural style: Neoclassical
- MPS: Missoula MPS
- NRHP reference No.: 90000661
- Added to NRHP: April 30, 1990

Hellgate Lodge 383 BPOE at 120 North Pattee Street in Missoula, Montana was built in 1911. Prominent Montana architectural firm Link & Haire of Great Falls, Montana designed the lodge for the Benevolent and Protective Order of Elks after having designed the nearby Masonic Lodge (Missoula, Montana). It was listed on the National Register of Historic Places in 1990. The building once housed features like bowling lanes and a shooting range. There have been many renovations to the building over the years, including a major first floor redesign by architect H. E. Kirkemo in 1950, but the exteriors of the floors above look much as they originally did.

== See also ==
- National Register of Historic Places listings in Missoula County, Montana
