= Benton County Courthouse =

Benton County Courthouse may refer to:

- Benton County Courthouse (Arkansas), Bentonville, Arkansas
- Benton County Courthouse (Indiana), Fowler, Indiana
- Benton County Courthouse (Iowa), Vinton, Iowa
- Benton County Courthouse (Mississippi), Ashland, Mississippi, a Mississippi Landmark
- Benton County Courthouse (Oregon), Corvallis, Oregon
- Benton County Courthouse (Washington), Prosser, Washington, listed on the National Register of Historic Places
