= Charles Haire =

Charles Haire may refer to:

- Charles Haire (Florida politician), first Intendant (position that preceded the office of mayor) of Tallahassee, Florida, United States (mayors of Tallahassee)
- Charles S. Haire, architect in Montana, United States, who was a partner in Link & Haire
