= St. Leo's Catholic Church (Lewistown, Montana) =

Historic church in Montana, United States

- U.S. National Register of Historic Places
- U.S. Historic district – Contributing property
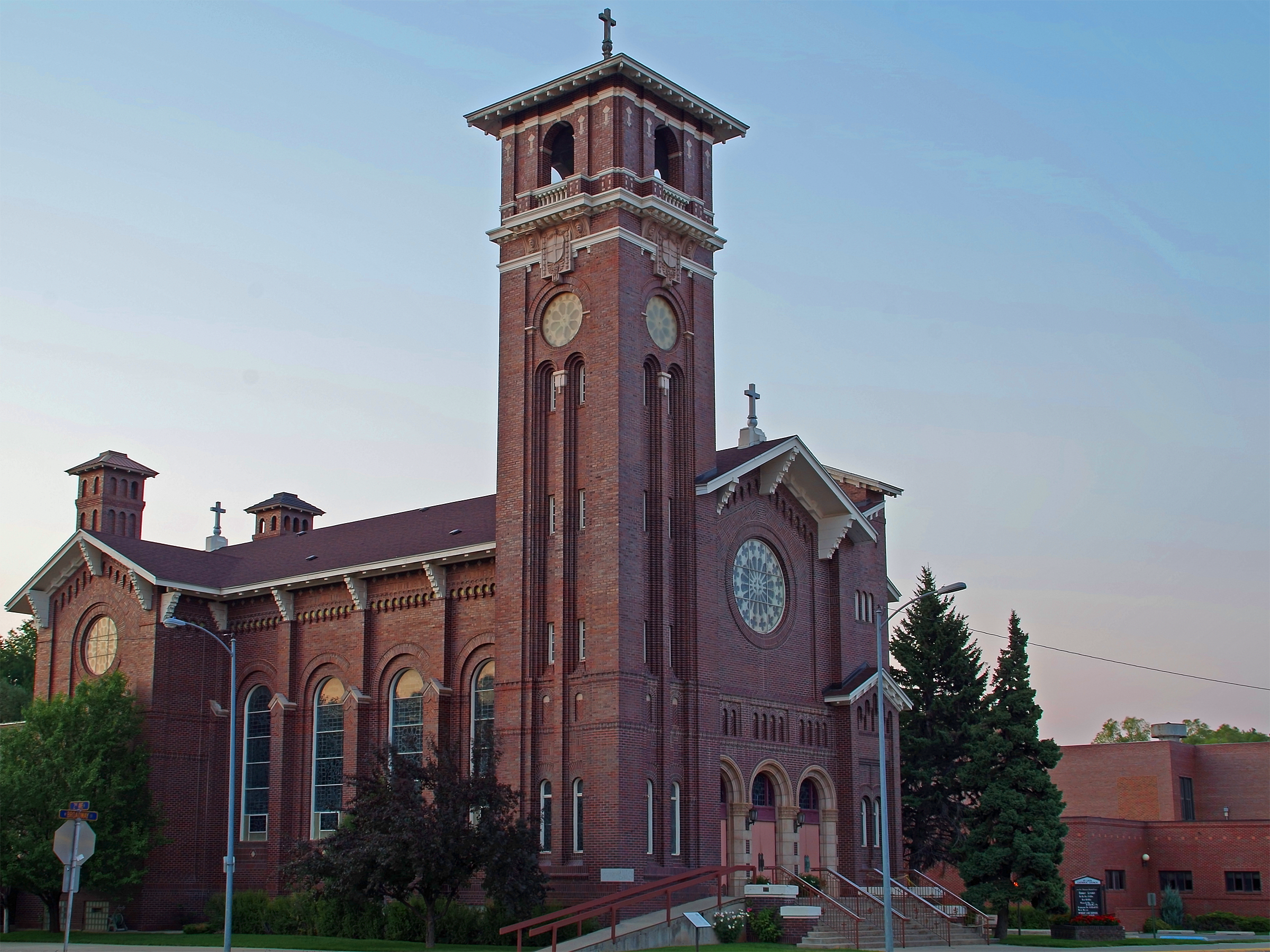

- Location within Montana
- Location: 124 W. Broadway, Lewistown, Montana
- Coordinates: 47°03′58″N 109°25′29″W
- Area: less than one acre
- Built: 1916
- Built by: Stanton & Smith
- Architect: Link & Haire
- Architectural style: Romanesque, Italian Early Christian
- Part of: Central Business Historic District (ID85001405)
- NRHP reference No.: 82003163

Significant dates
- Added to NRHP: May 6, 1982
- Designated CP: June 27, 1985

The St. Leo's Catholic Church in parish of the Roman Catholic Church in Lewistown, Montana, in the Diocese of Great Falls–Billings.

It is noted for its historic parish church, built in 1916. It was designed by architects Link & Haire and includes a 95 feet (29 m) bell tower. It was built by contractors Stanton & Smith. The church was listed on the National Register of Historic Places in 1982.
