= Grandey Elementary School =

- U.S. National Register of Historic Places
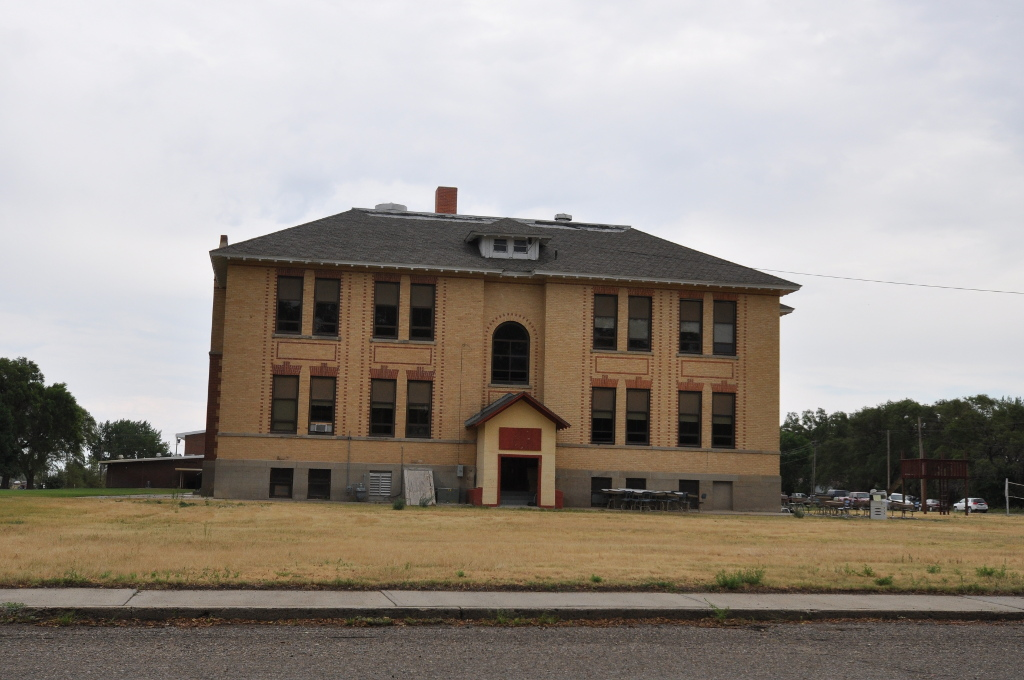

- Location within Montana Location within the United States
- Location: Off U.S. Route 10, Terry, Montana
- Coordinates: 46°47′29″N 105°18′33″W
- Area: 1.8 acres (0.73 ha)
- Built: 1908
- Built by: Wortman, George
- Architect: Link & Haire
- NRHP reference No.: 78001689
- Added to NRHP: November 16, 1978

The Grandey Elementary School is a site on the National Register of Historic Places located in Terry, Montana. It was added to the Register in 1978.

The school was built in 1908 to entice "Professor" Charles William Grandey to stay as a teacher in Terry. It was paid for by a $20,000 bond which passed unanimously, and the former 24 by 24 feet (7.3 m × 7.3 m) school was converted to a house for Mr. and Mrs. Grandey, who occupied it for 12 years.

It is a three-story brick structure with the first floor about four feet below grade, and is about 77.5 by 75.5 feet (23.6 m × 23.0 m) in plan. It has light buff-colored load-bearing brick walls, with dark reddish brick accents in bands and window caps. The building includes a fire escape on the south side of the building, via a metal chute from the third floor's art room.

The school was still in use in 1977.
