= Fallon County Jail =

- U.S. National Register of Historic Places
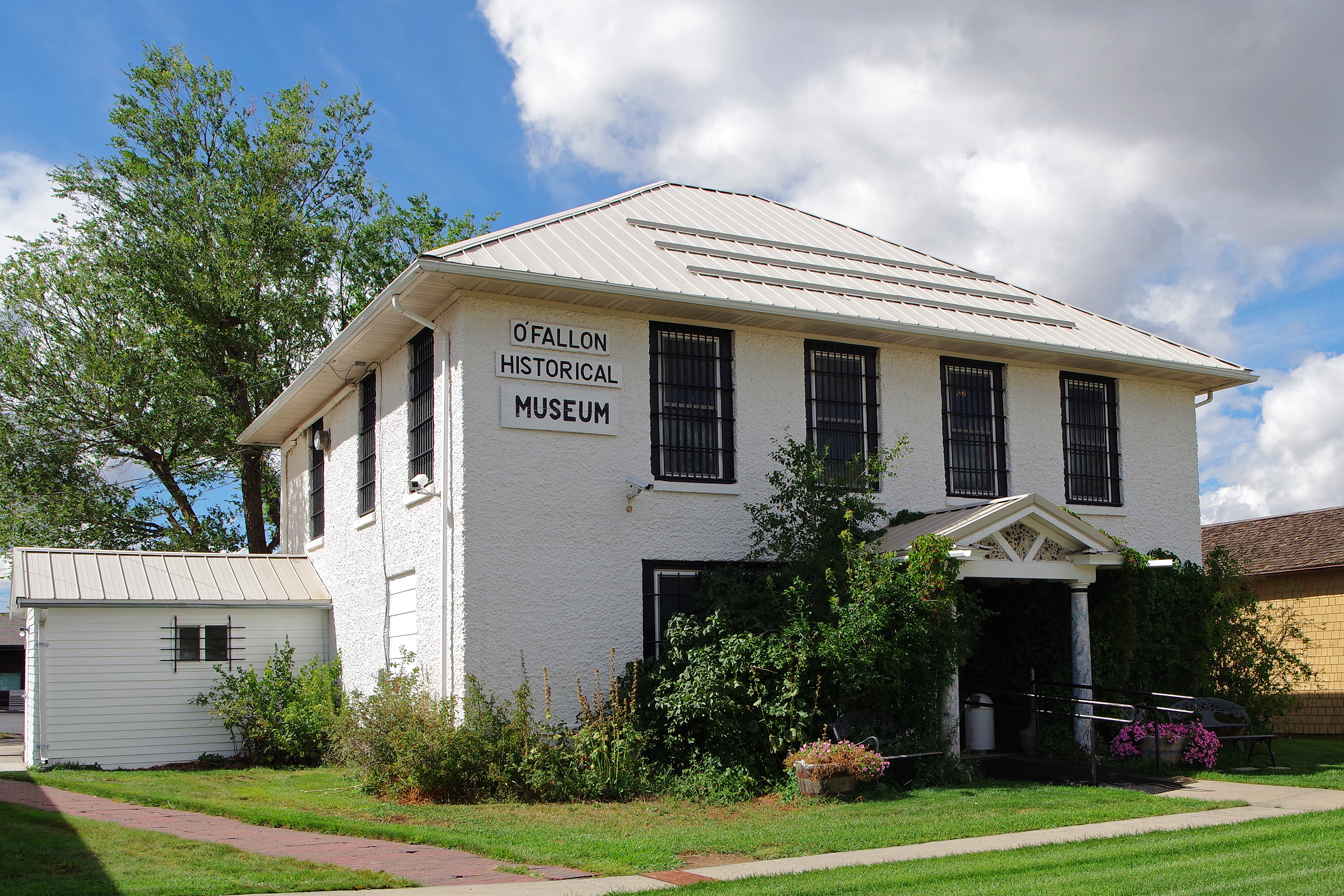

- Location within Montana Location within the United States
- Location: 723 S. Main St.
- Coordinates: 46°21′37″N 104°16′31″W
- Architect: Link & Haire
- Architectural style: Craftsman
- NRHP reference No.: 98000946
- Added to NRHP: July 31, 1998

The Fallon County Jail is a site on the National Register of Historic Places located in Baker, Montana. It was added to the Register on July 31, 1998. The building is now a part of the O'Fallon Historical Museum. One of the main exhibits is Steer Montana, known as the world's largest steer, weighing 3,980 pounds (1,805 kg).
