= Rosebud County Courthouse =

- U.S. National Register of Historic Places
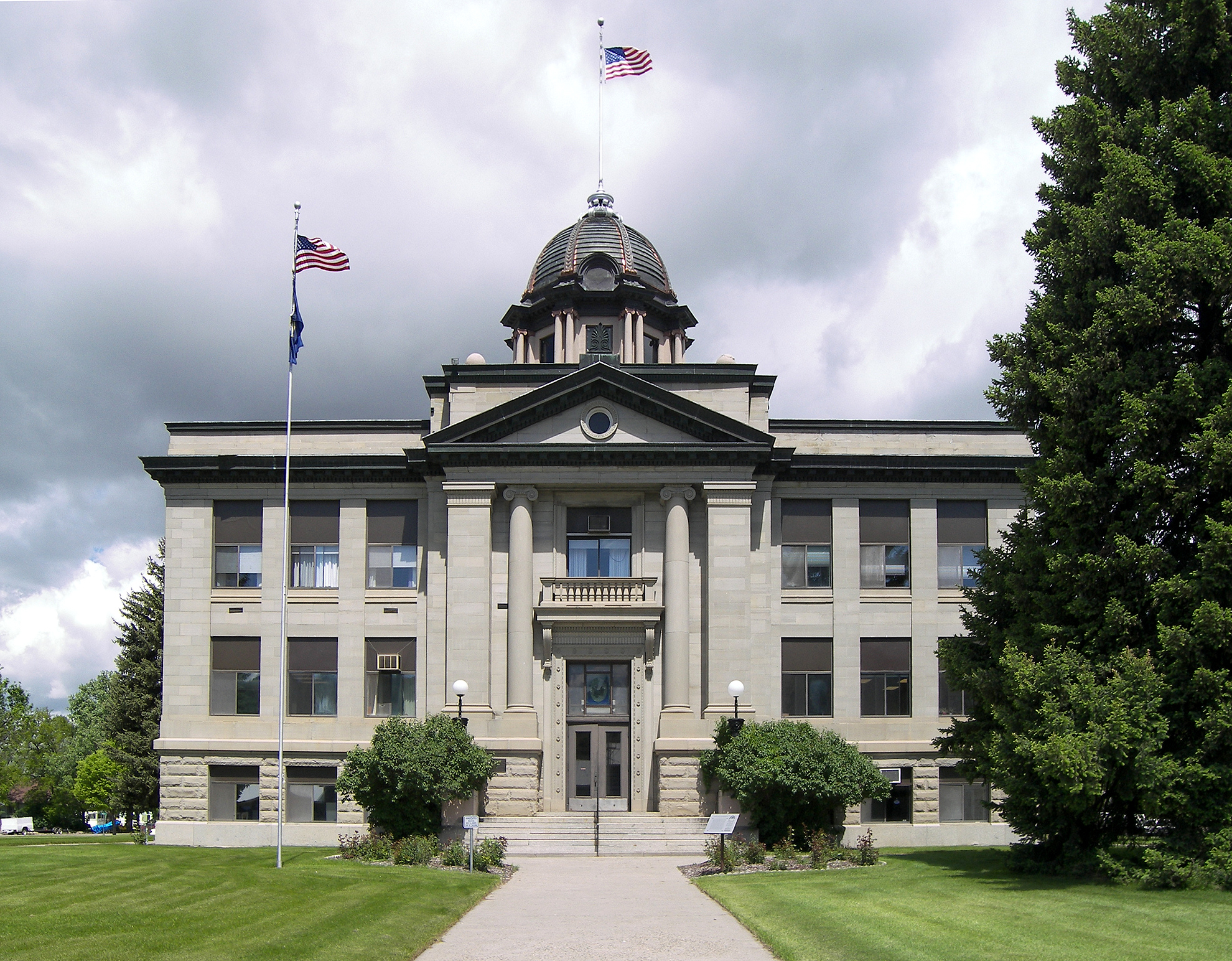

- Location within Montana Location within the United States
- Interactive map showing the location of Rosebud County Courthouse
- Location: 1250 Main St., Forsyth, Montana
- Coordinates: 46.267768°N 106.675157°W
- Area: 2 acres (0.81 ha)
- Built: 1913
- Built by: Gray Const. Co.
- Architect: Link & Haire
- Architectural style: Classical Revival
- NRHP reference No.: 86000807
- Added to NRHP: April 17, 1986

The Rosebud County Courthouse, located on Main St. between 12th and 13th Avenues in Forsyth in Rosebud County, Montana, was built in 1913. It was listed on the National Register of Historic Places in 1986.

It is a two-story concrete and masonry building on an elevated sandstone foundation. It was described in its NRHP nomination as a "good example of the distinctive Neo-Classical style as designed by the well known Montana architectural firm of Link and Haire."
