= Lewis and Clark County Hospital Historic District =

Historic district in Montana, United States

- U.S. National Register of Historic Places
- U.S. Historic district
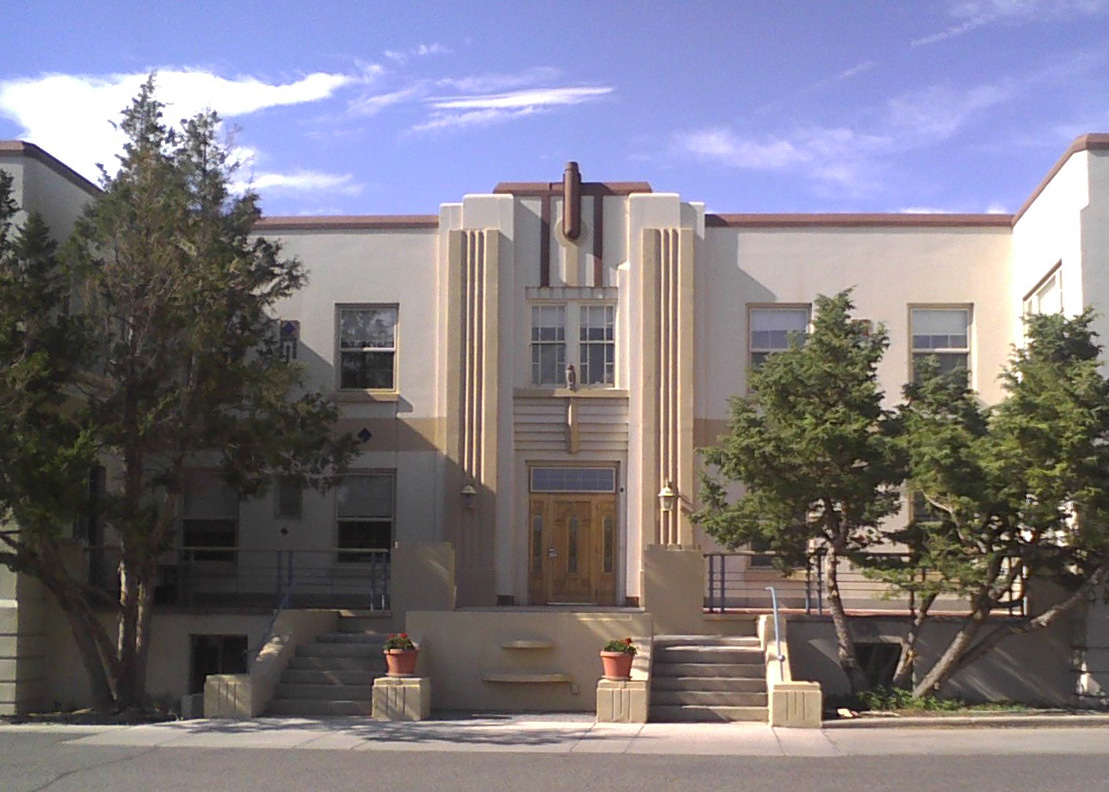
- Old Cooney Hospital, built 1939, photo 2012

- Location within Montana Location within the United States
- Location: 3404 Cooney Dr., Helena, Montana
- Coordinates: 46°37′20″N 112°2′12″W
- Area: 3.8 acres (1.5 ha)
- Built: 1891
- Architect: Charles S. Haire; J. G. Link & Company
- Architectural style: Art Deco, Moderne
- NRHP reference No.: 02001101 (original); 100010499 (increase)

Significant dates
- Added to NRHP: November 19, 2002
- Boundary increase: July 1, 2024

The Lewis and Clark County Hospital Historic District is a historic district in Helena, Lewis and Clark County, Montana. It has also been known as "Cooney Convalescent Home", "Miner's Hospital", "Poor Farm", and "Old Cooney Home". There are seven buildings and a garden on the property; four buildings and the garden are part of the historic district: the hospital, detention hospital, shed, superintendent's residence, and garden. The non-contributing buildings are the modern garage, concrete garage, and ambulance garage.

== History ==
Public hospital care in Lewis and Clark County began with the Miner's Hospital in 1866. Until 1885, public medical care occurred at several locations and via multiple funding mechanisms, including a "Poor Farm" where people grew their own food. The current location came into use in 1885 when a new hospital was built on the current site, designed by M. Bakker. In 1891 it became known as the Lewis and Clark County Hospital, with a focus on providing care for those who could not afford a private hospital, which was a major problem in the days before Social Security, especially for those without children to provide assistance. Expansion of the building occurred in the early 1890s and again in 1899, when architect Charles S. Haire designed new wings.

From the 1880s to the 1920s, records show that more than 350 people were buried on this site in a county cemetery, although the markers are long gone and the exact location of the cemetery is unknown.

=== Earthquake and rebuilding ===
The original hospital structure was destroyed on October 18, 1935, when a major earthquake struck Helena. The current historic main hospital building was built in 1937–1939 to replace it. This structure is a T-shaped, two-story, concrete building with a basement. The Helena office of J. G. Link & Company were the architects of this Art Deco/Early Moderne design, which includes a flat roof, colored concrete, and diamond-shaped tiles. The south side has a central entrance. There are many bays and windows around the exterior of the building. The interior floorplan has remained essentially the same as it was in 1939. The hospital became the county-owned convalescent home on September 24, 1961 and was renamed the Cooney Convalescent Home.

Dr. Cooney, in whose honor the hospital was renamed and the street was named, began working there in the 1920s and served as administrator until the 1950s. In 1984, the Cooney Convalescent Home moved to a new location on the other side of Helena, near St. Peter's Hospital, and the building was converted to office space, mostly occupied by various healthcare practitioners.

=== Smaller buildings ===
The detention hospital, also designed by C. S. Haire, is rectangular and was built in 1901. It has decorative brickwork, a basement, green asphalt shingles, and overhangs. The south side has three bays. Some of the windows are modern replacements, though true to the original style. The west side has a large brick exterior chimney. The shed is a small, rectangular one-story concrete building between the west and north wings. It has green asphalt shingles and was built around 1939. The superintendent's residence is the oldest structure in the complex and was built around 1891. It is a one-story brick building and the exterior walls were stuccoed after the 1935 earthquake. The rest of the residence is essentially unchanged since it was built. There is a porch on the north end. The garden is west of the residence, is rectangular in shape, and has concrete walkways. There is also a concrete fountain, though it is no longer functioning.

There are three garages on the property, but they are non-contributing to the official designation of historic district: the ambulance, concrete, and modern garages. The ambulance garage is a brick rectangular structure built in 1900 on a raised concrete foundation. Much of the brickwork is similar to that of the detention hospital. The ambulance garage is not one of the contributing buildings to the historic district because it is now connected to the concrete garage and its doors and windows were modified. This combined building now houses a restaurant. The modern garage is of frame construction and built in the early 1990s. It is slightly north of the residence and has asphalt shingles and two garage doors. The concrete garage is just northwest of the modern garage and was built after 1950 with a raised concrete foundation and has green asphalt shingles. It is non-contributing because it has been modified with more modern brickwork, stucco, and siding.

== See also ==
- National Register of Historic Places listings in Lewis and Clark County, Montana
