= Soldiers' Home Historic District =

Historic district in Montana, United States

- U.S. National Register of Historic Places
- U.S. Historic district
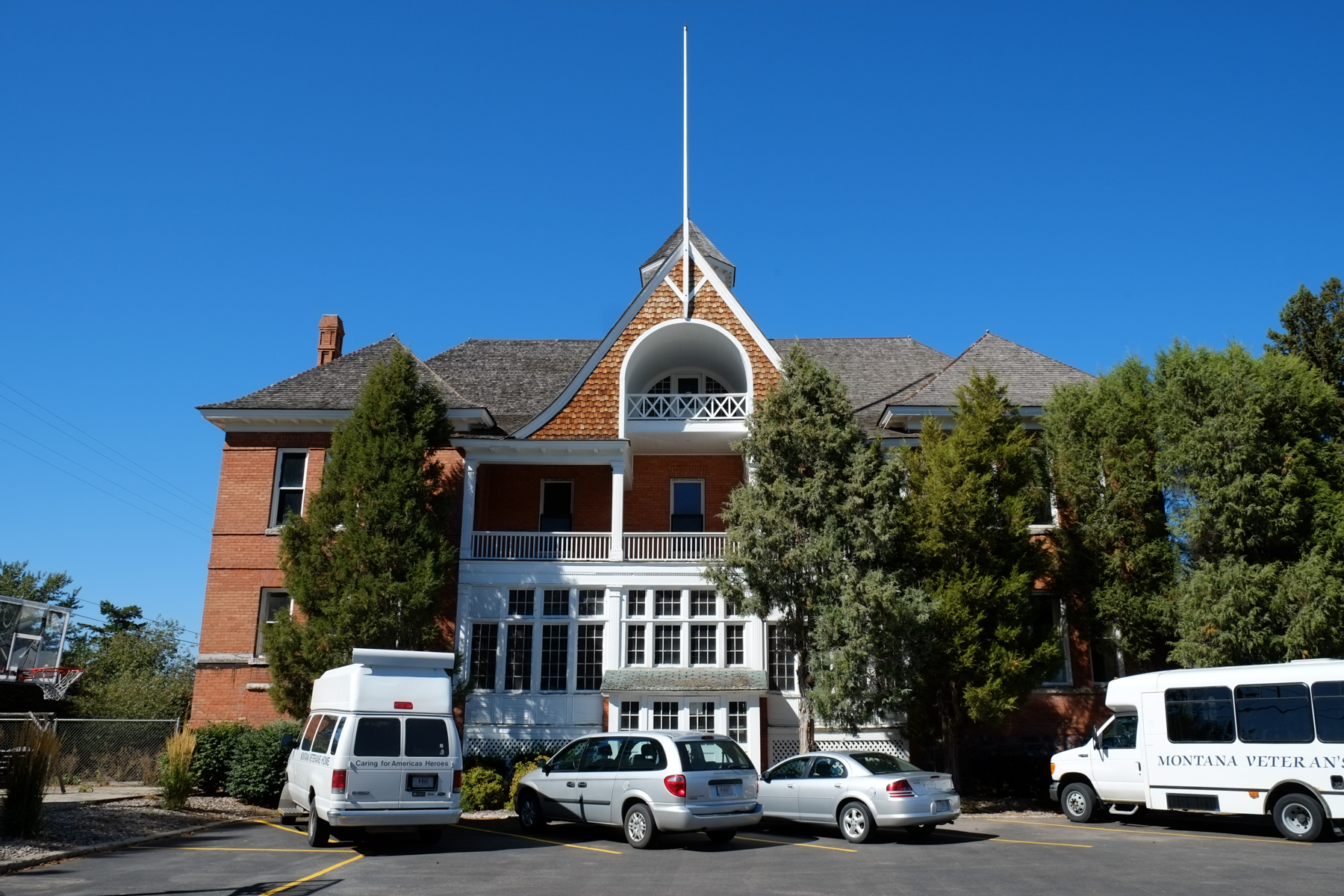

- Location within Montana Location within the United States
- Location: Veterans Drive, Columbia Falls, Montana
- Coordinates: 48°21′27″N 114°12′37″W
- Area: 147 acres (59 ha)
- Built: 1896
- Built by: Fred Whiteside
- Architect: Charles S. Haire
- Architectural style: Colonial Revival, Queen Anne
- NRHP reference No.: 94000385
- Added to NRHP: April 21, 1994

The Soldiers' Home Historic District, a historic Old soldiers' home campus, is located in Columbia Falls, Flathead County, Montana.

The 147 acres (59 ha) historic district has 9 listed buildings, designed in the Victorian Queen Anne and Colonial Revival styles.

Originally called the Montana State Soldiers' Home, and now the Montana Veterans' Home, the institution has served veterans since 1896. The mission of the home is, "to honor the service of Montana’s veterans by serving them in turn in their time of need."

It was added to the National Register of Historic Places in 1994.

== History ==
In the 1890s, Montana had 25 Civil War veterans living on county poor farms, out of a total of 2,500 veterans. In 1895, the Montana State legislature responded to lobbying by the Grand Army of the Republic (G.A.R.) and authorized the establishment of a soldiers' home. Columbia Falls was selected out of a group of eight communities. Its citizens donated $3,100. Additionally, 147 acres of land were donated by the Northern Improvement Co., a subsidiary of the Great Northern Railway.

Charles S. Haire designed the old main building, which was built by Fred Whiteside, a builder and Montana politician, in 1896.

Haire also designed a small hospital in 1900. The hospital became the Commandant's House in 1980. A new, larger hospital built in 1908 has since been demolished. The 1919 Service Building has a chapel, and housed the employees of the home. A cemetery was established in 1897.

A new housing facility for veterans, the Montana Veterans' Home, was opened by Montana Governor Forrest H. Anderson at an official dedication ceremony in 1970. It provides housing and subsistence to veterans, and in some cases, to veterans' spouses.

An E. M. Viquesney statue of a World War I doughboy was moved to the front of the Veterans' Home in 1972. The statue originally stood in front of the Flathead County Courthouse in Kalispell, in Main Street's median.

== See also ==
- National Register of Historic Places listings in Flathead County, Montana
