= Rundle Building =

- U.S. National Register of Historic Places
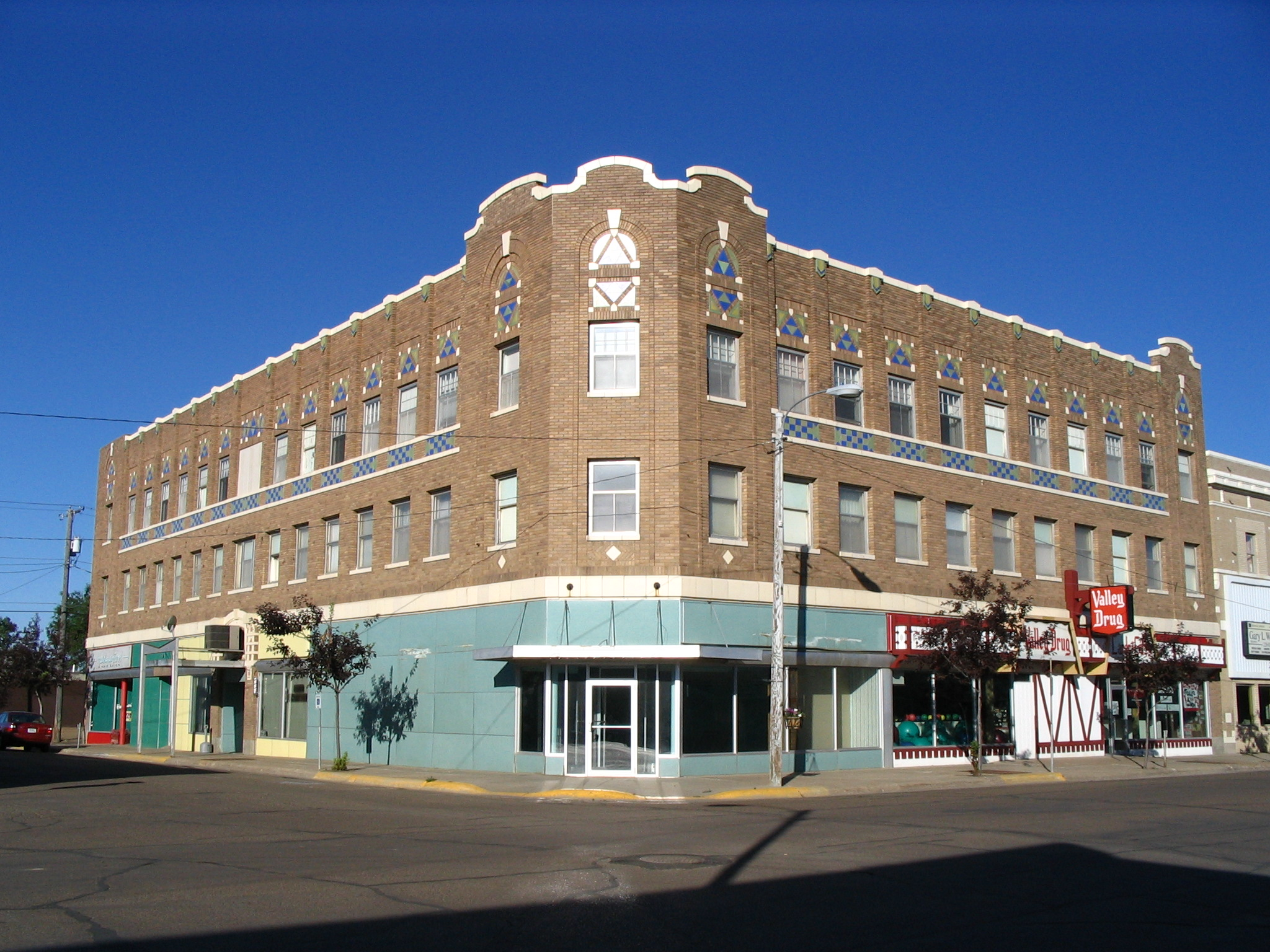

- Location within Montana Location within the United States
- Location: 208 Fifth St. S, Glasgow, Montana
- Coordinates: 48°11′38″N 106°38′13″W
- Area: less than one acre
- Built: 1916
- Architect: Link and Haire
- Architectural style: Western Commercial
- NRHP reference No.: 06001092
- Added to NRHP: November 29, 2006

The Rundle Building in Glasgow in Valley County, Montana was built in 1916. It was designed by architects Link and Haire. It has also been known as Glasgow Hotel. It was listed on the National Register of Historic Places in 2006.

It is a two-part three-story fireproof brick Western Commercial 90 by 130 feet (27 m × 40 m) building with "colorful detailed terra cotta tile work, raised brick arches, and coped, shaped parapet walls reminiscent of Spanish Mission Revival architecture." It originally had a billiards room and a bowling alley.
