= Huntoon Residence =

Historic house in Montana, United States

- U.S. National Register of Historic Places
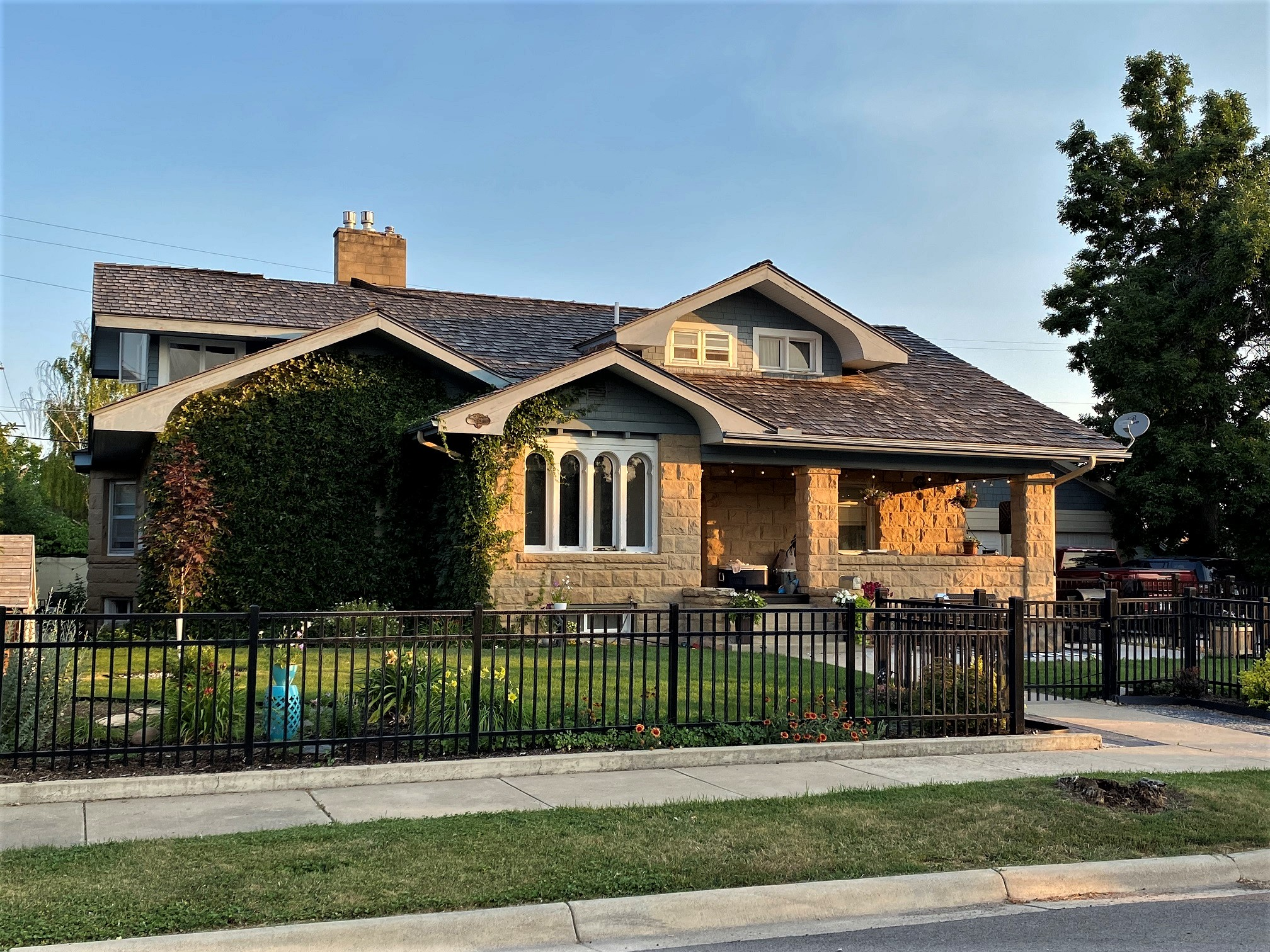

- Location within Montana Location within the United States
- Location: 722 W. Water; Lewistown, Montana
- Coordinates: 47°03′24″N 109°25′38″W
- Area: less than one acre
- Built: 1916
- Architect: Link and Haire
- Architectural style: Eclectic
- MPS: Lewistown MRA
- NRHP reference No.: 85001408
- Added to NRHP: June 27, 1985

The Huntoon Residence, at 722 W. Water in Lewistown, Montana, was built in 1916. It was designed by architects Link and Haire. It was listed on the National Register of Historic Places in 1985.

It is a one-and-a-half-story cut stone building. It was deemed "an excellent example of a very well executed architectural design using the popular stone materials of Lewistown". The house was in its time "'the finest and most costly residence to be erected in Lewistown'".

It is significant also for its association with local attorney J. C. Huntoon, who was elected county attorney in 1908, formed a partnership in 1914, and was appointed Judge of the Tenth Judicial District in 1922.
