= Masonic Building (Billings, Montana) =

- Masonic Temple
- U.S. National Register of Historic Places
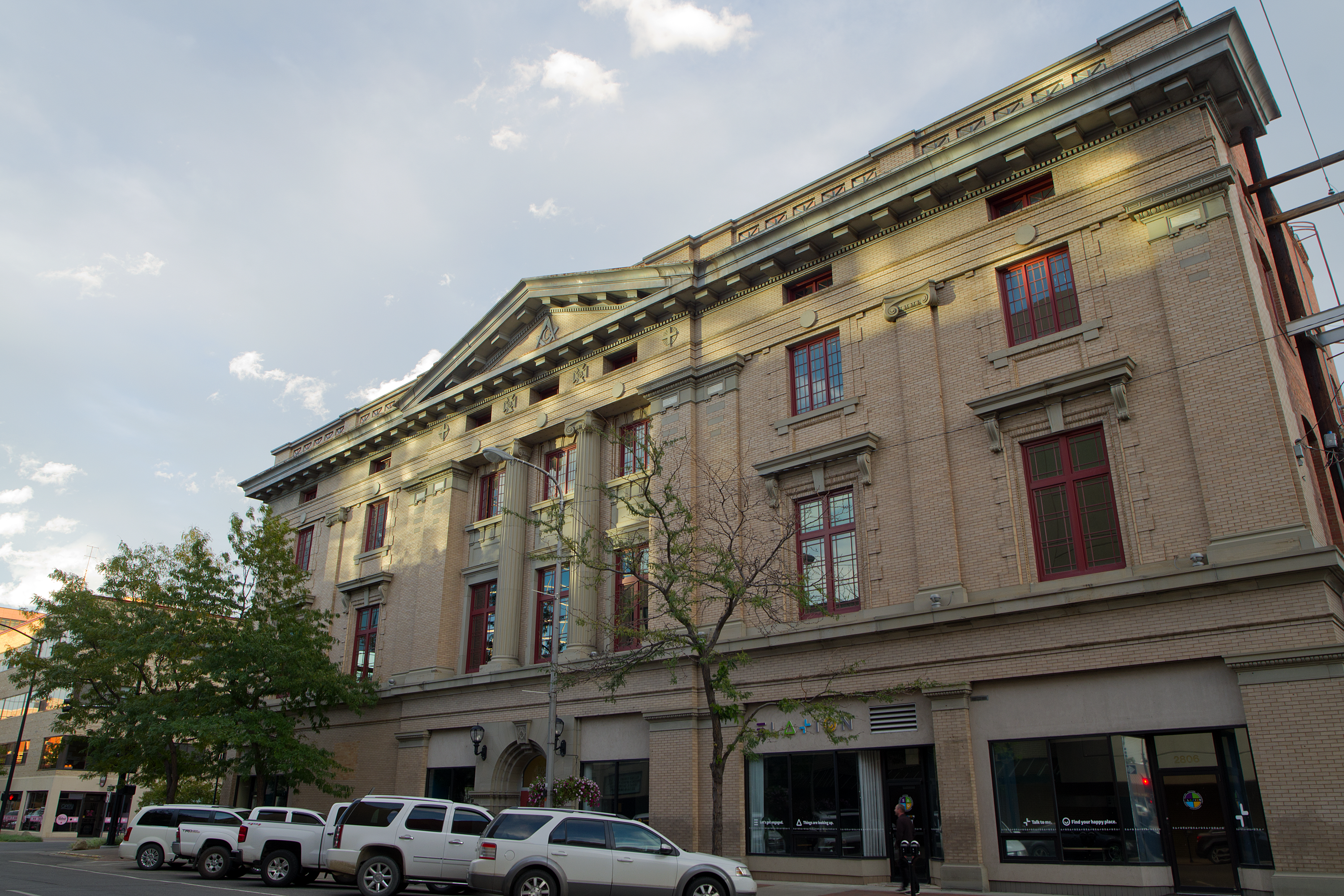

- Location within Montana Location within the United States
- Location: 2806 Third Ave. N., Billings, Montana
- Coordinates: 45°47′1″N 108°30′25″W
- Area: less than one acre
- Built: 1910
- Architect: Link & Haire
- Architectural style: Late 19th and 20th Century Revivals, Second Renaissance Revival
- NRHP reference No.: 86000847
- Added to NRHP: April 17, 1986

The Masonic Building, (referred to by Montana State University as the Broadway III building) is a historic building in Billings, Montana, United States, that was built in 1910. It was listed on the National Register of Historic Places in 1986 as Masonic Temple.

It was deemed "significant for its architecture as a good example of the second Renaissance Revival style, designed by the well known Montana architectural firm of Link and Haire. The Temple is also significant because it reflects the importance of the Masonic Order in the early community social life in Billings, Montana, and for its collective associations with many of the most notable men involved in the community's development at the turn of the century."

The building was sold in 2003 to Michael and Rebecca Gray and houses their advertising agency, G&G.

In 2013 it was an educational building of the Montana State University Billings Urban Institute. In October 2016 it became a bookstore.

In 2025, the Widmyer Corporation purchased the building after five years of near vacancy. According to a representative from the Widmyer Corporation, visions for the "building includes retail/restaurant space on the ground level, housing on the second floor, with small, energy efficient units, and commercial/community office space on the third floor".
