= Forsyth Main Street Historic District =

Historic district in Montana, United States

- U.S. National Register of Historic Places
- U.S. Historic district
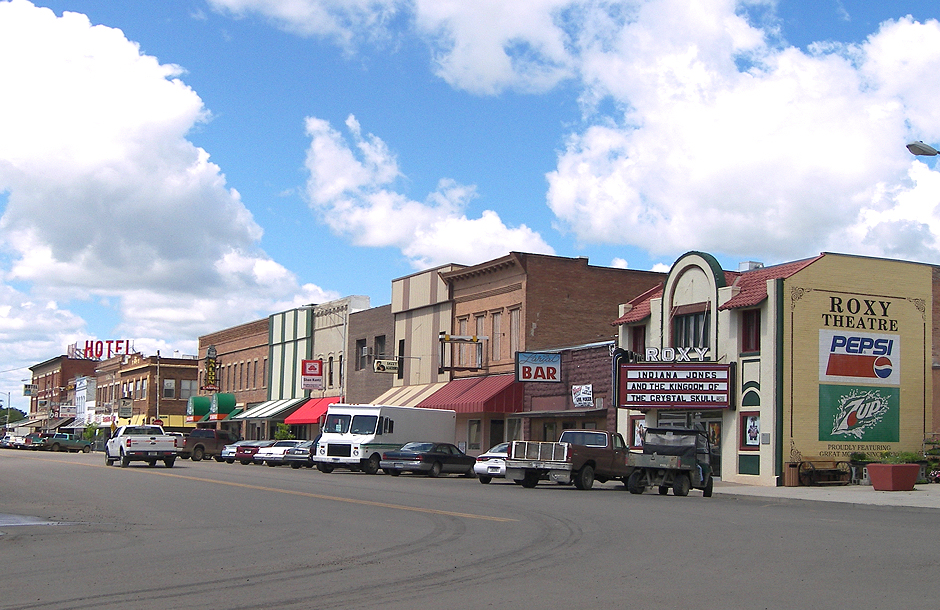

- Location within Montana Location within the United States
- Location: Roughly bounded by Cedar St., 11th Ave., Main St., and 8th St., Forsyth, Montana
- Coordinates: 46°15′57″N 106°40′42″W
- Area: 4 acres (1.6 ha)
- Architect: Link & Haire, others
- Architectural style: Classical Revival, Renaissance Revival, Italianate
- MPS: Forsyth MPS
- NRHP reference No.: 90000081
- Added to NRHP: February 12, 1990

The Forsyth Main Street Historic District is a 4 acres (1.6 ha) historic district in Forsyth, Montana which was listed on the National Register of Historic Places in 1990. It included 24 contributing buildings.

The district is roughly bounded by Cedar St., 11th Ave., Main St., and 8th St. It includes work by architects Link & Haire and others, in Classical Revival, Renaissance Revival, and Italianate styles.

Buildings include:

- Commercial Hotel (1903–06), 807-825 Main St., Renaissance Revival
- Masonic Temple (1911), 1031-1047 Main St., Renaissance Revival
- McCuistion Building (1913), 1025 Main St.
- Austin & Laughlin Livery, 152 North 10th
- Roxy Theatre (1930), 981 Main St., Spanish Eclectic
- Thornton & Choisser Saloon, 963 Main St.
- Merchant's Bank Block, 927 Main St.
- Alexander Hotel, 905-923 Main
- American Hotel Cafe, 145 North 9th
- J.E. Choisser Block, 167 North 9th
- Kennedy-Fletcher Block, 164-182 N. 9th
- Bank of Commerce, 158 North 9th
- Wachholz Building, 879-897 Main
