= Link & Haire =

Architectural firm in Montana

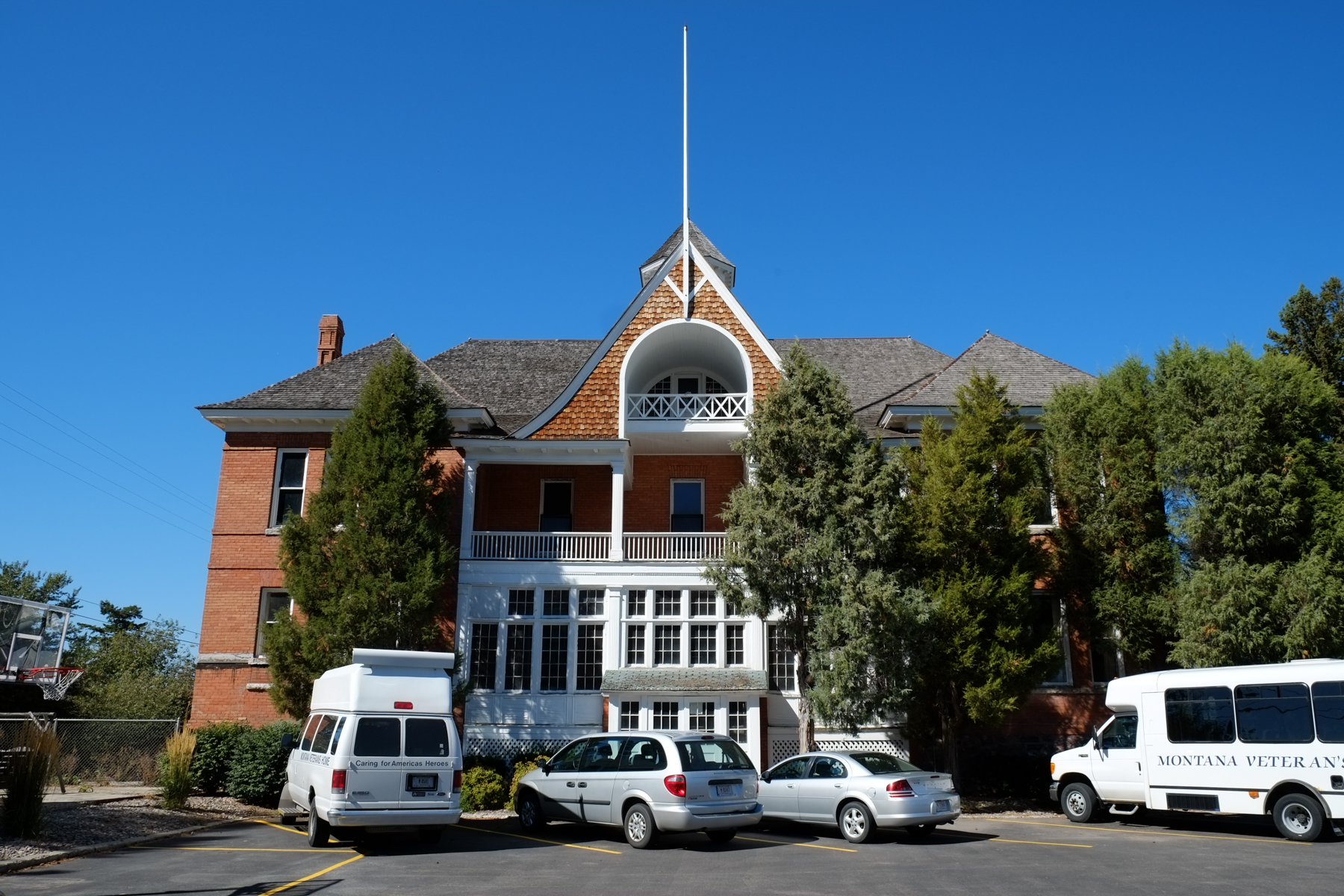
Soldiers' Home, Columbia Falls, 1896.

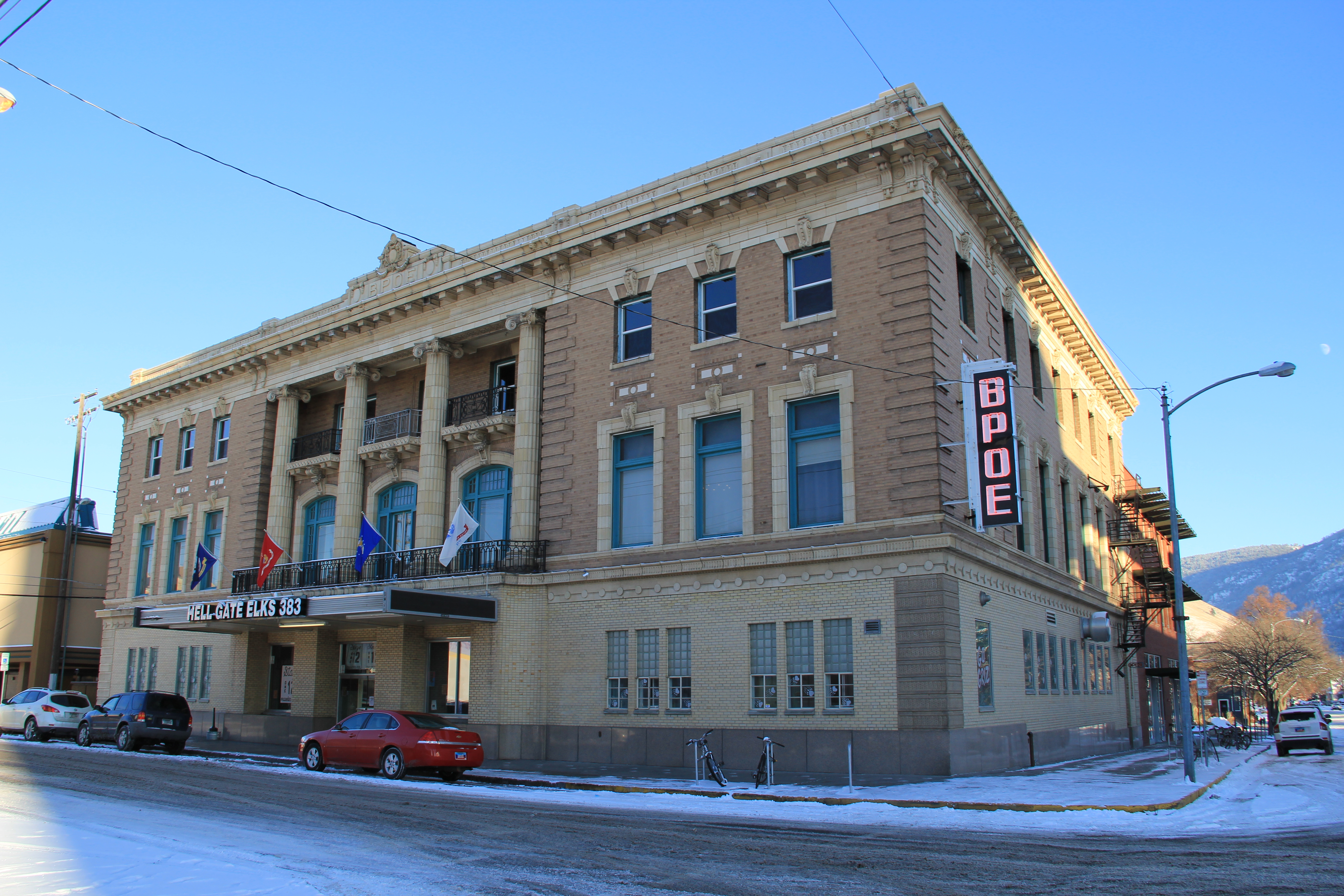
Elks Building, Missoula, 1909.

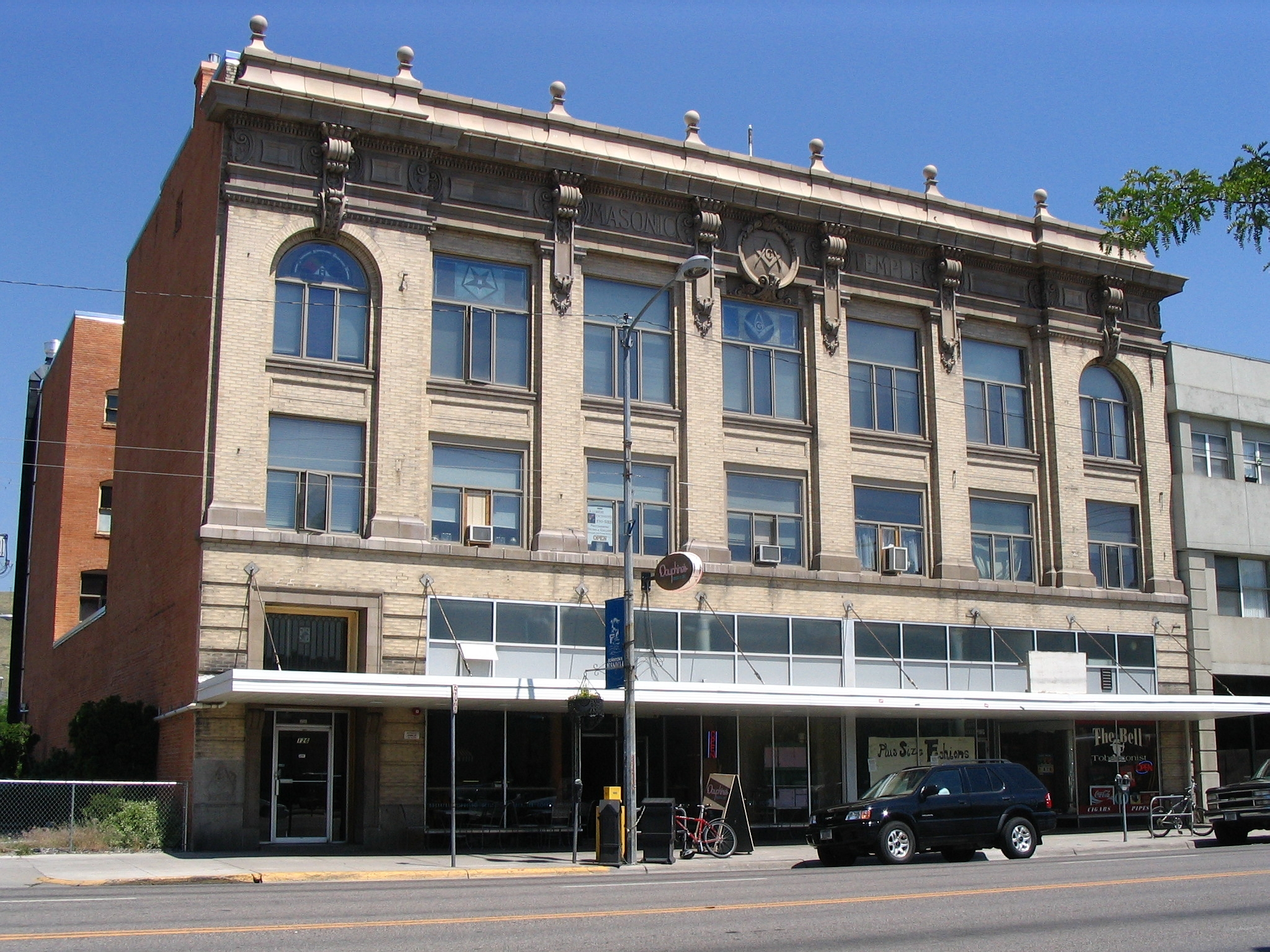
Masonic Temple, Missoula, 1909.

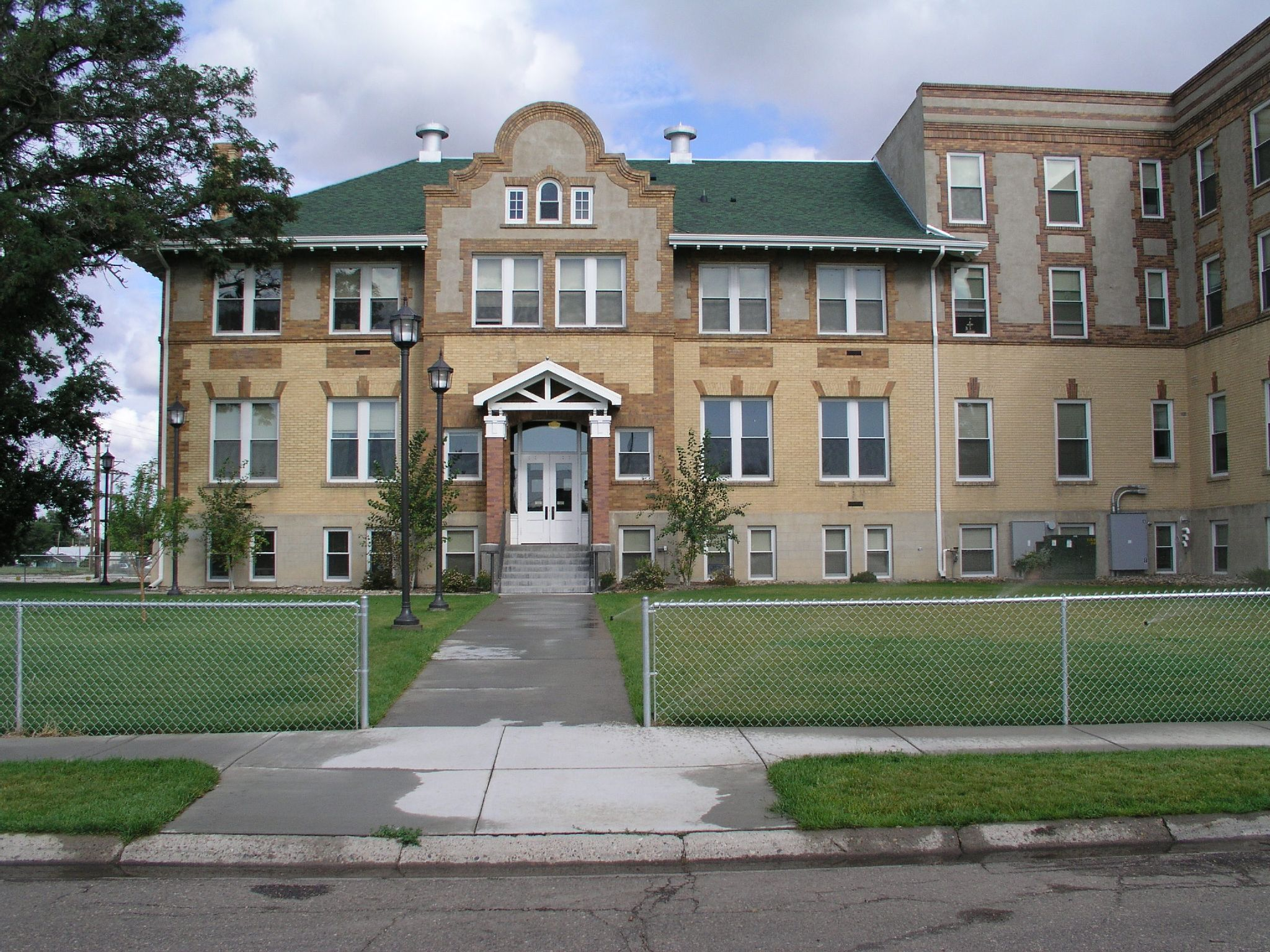
Holy Rosary Hospital, Miles City, 1910.

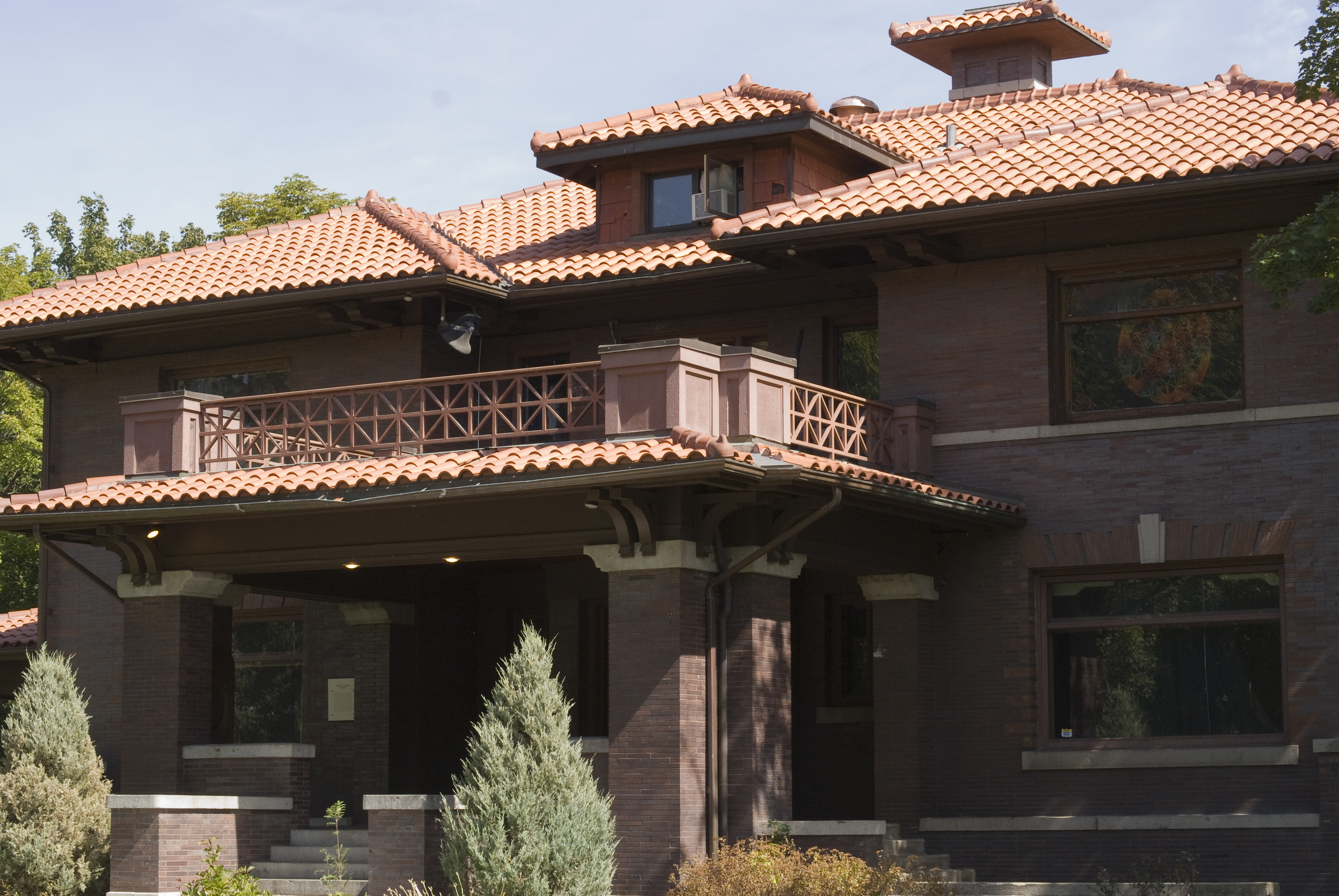
John M. Keith House, Missoula, 1910.

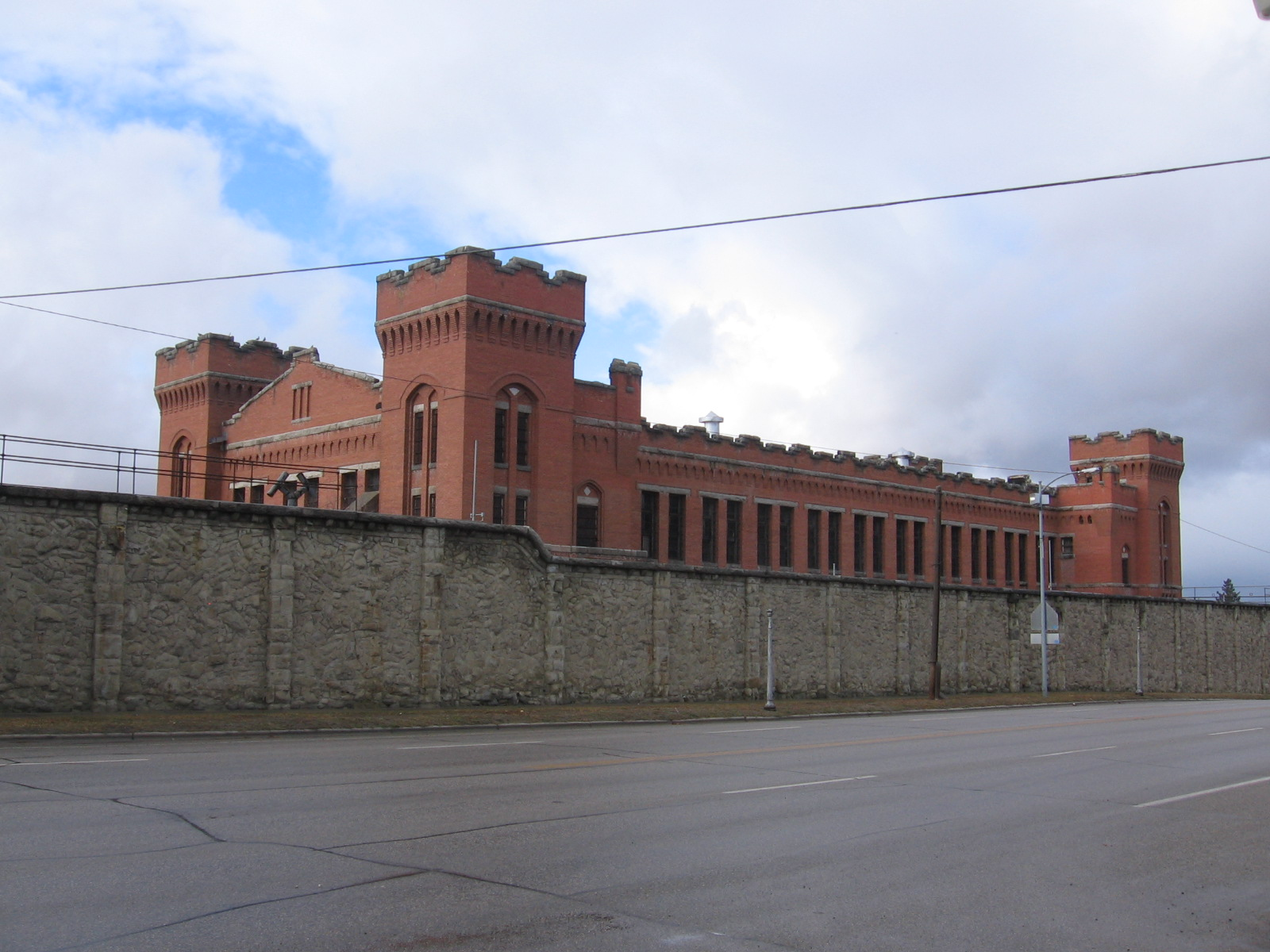
Cellblock No. 1, Montana State Prison, Deer Lodge, 1912.

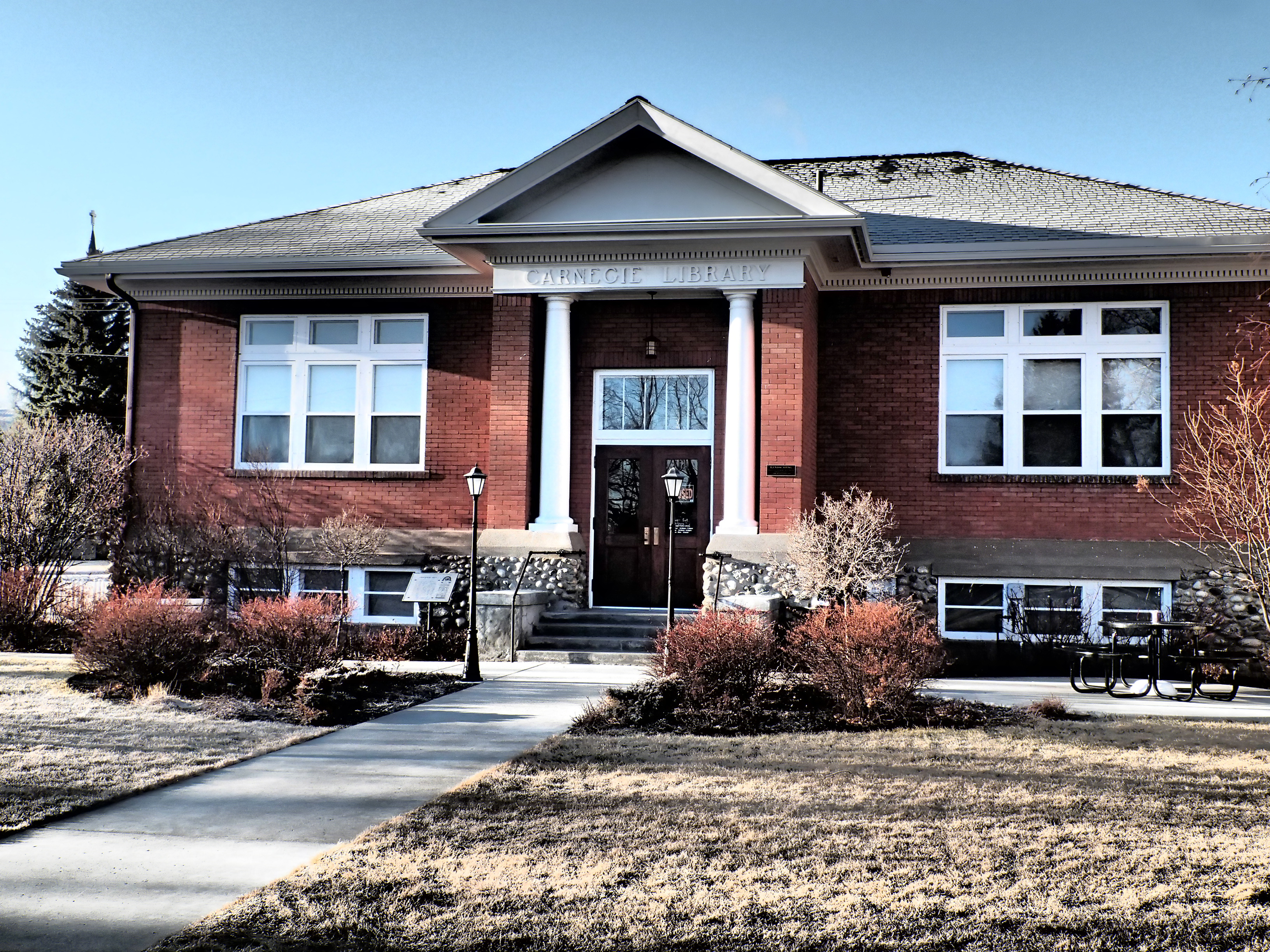
Carnegie Library, Big Timber, 1913.

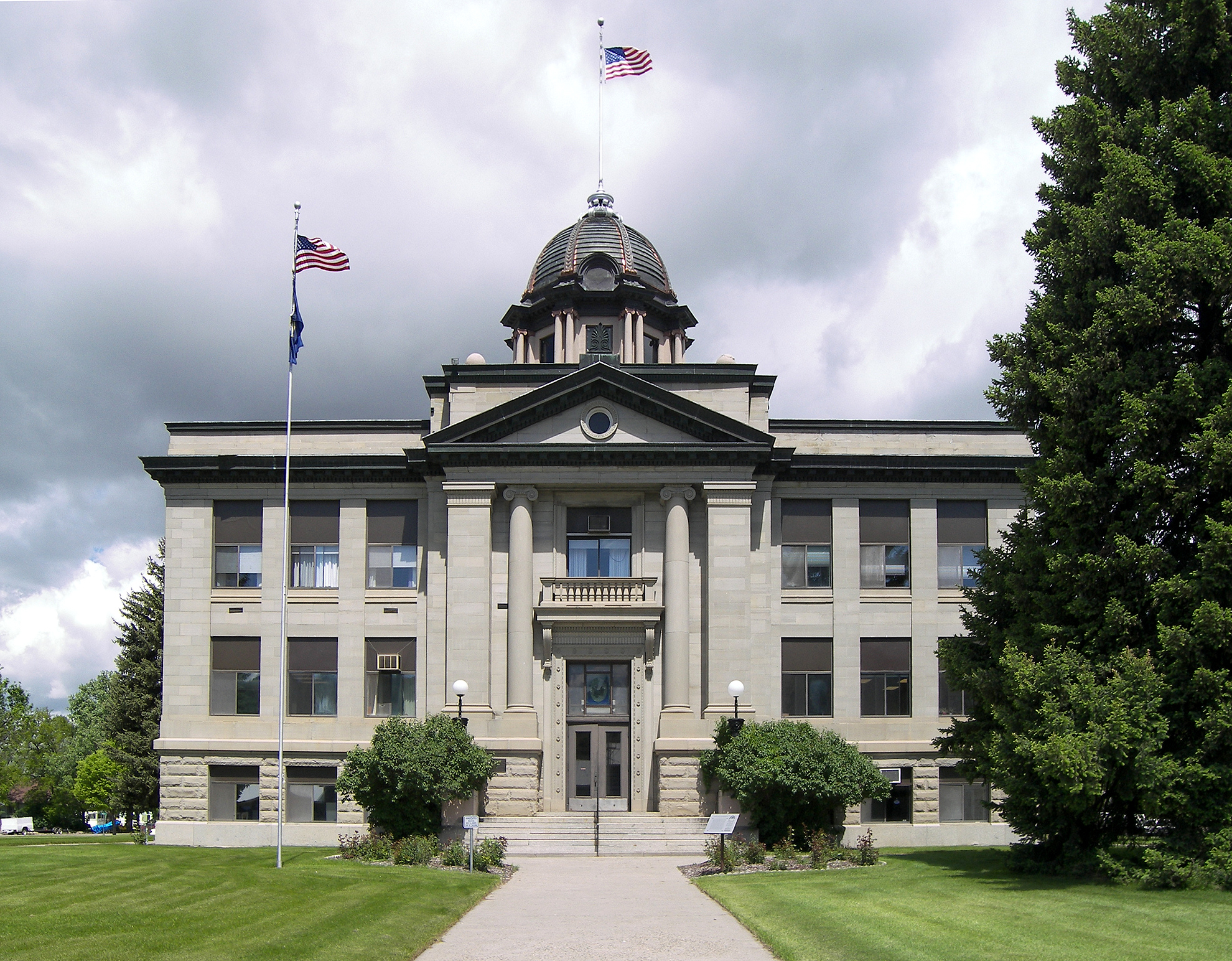
County Courthouse, Forsyth, 1913.

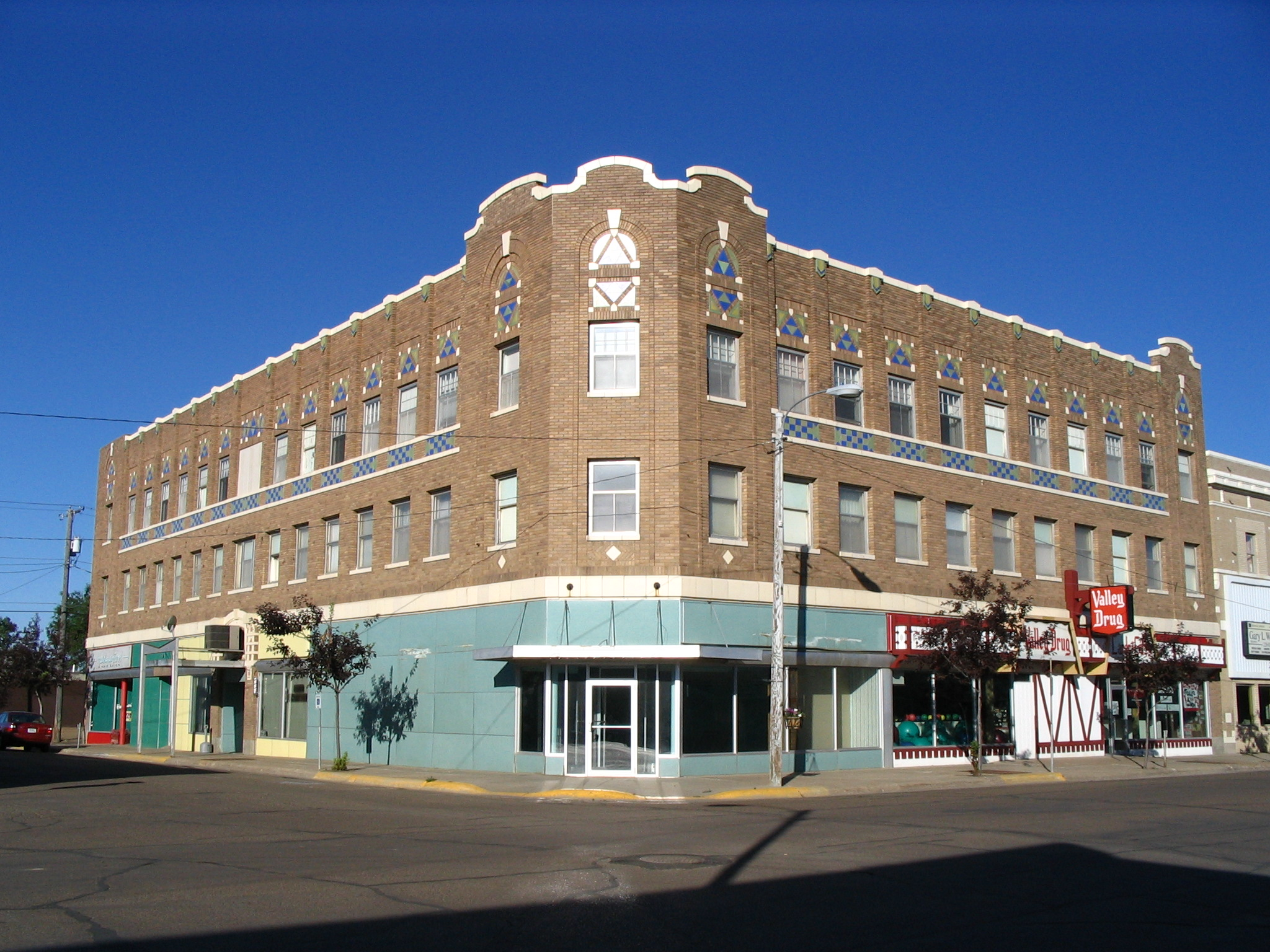
Rundle Building, Glasgow, 1916.

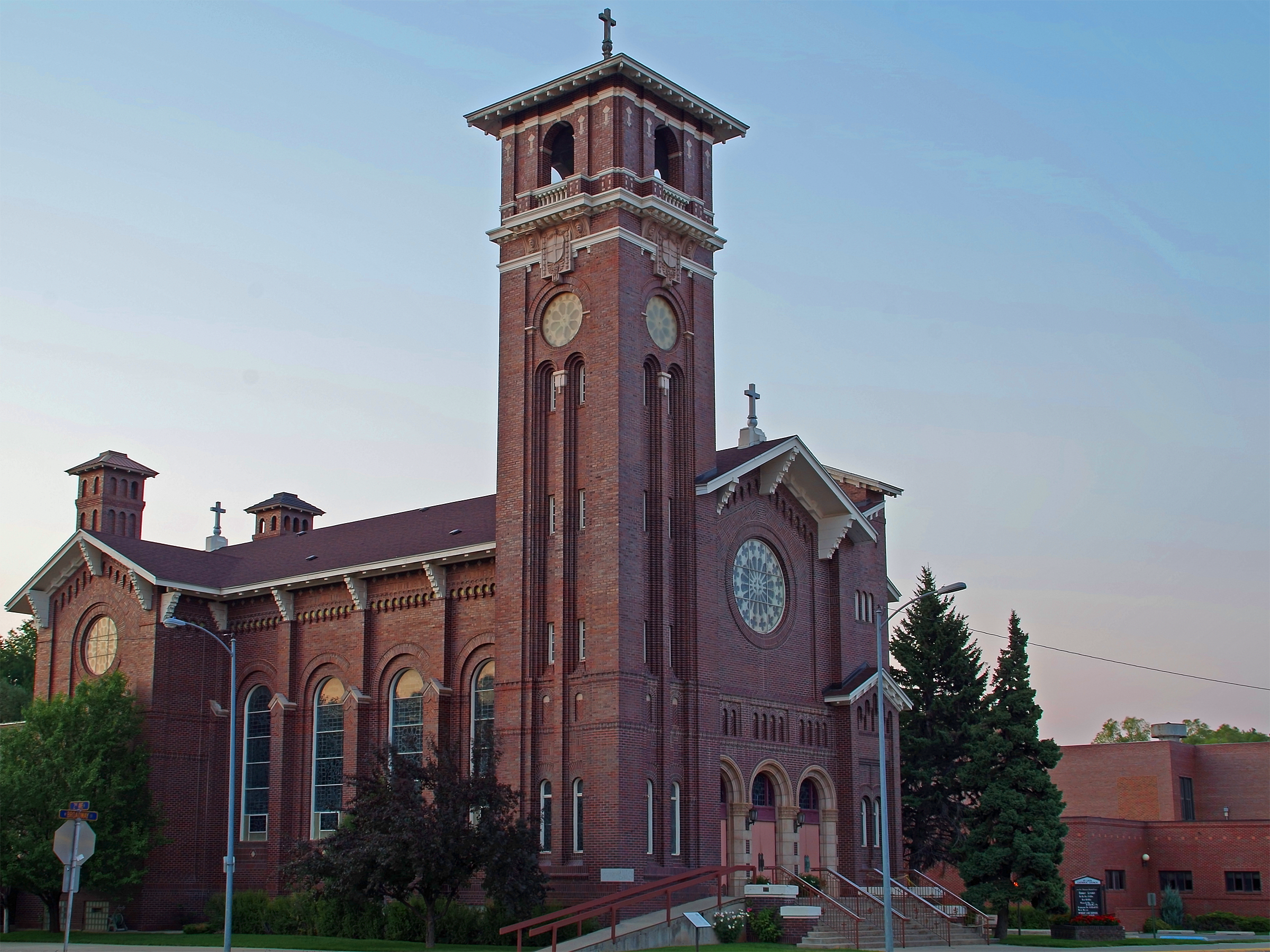
St. Leo's R. C. Church, Lewistown, 1916.

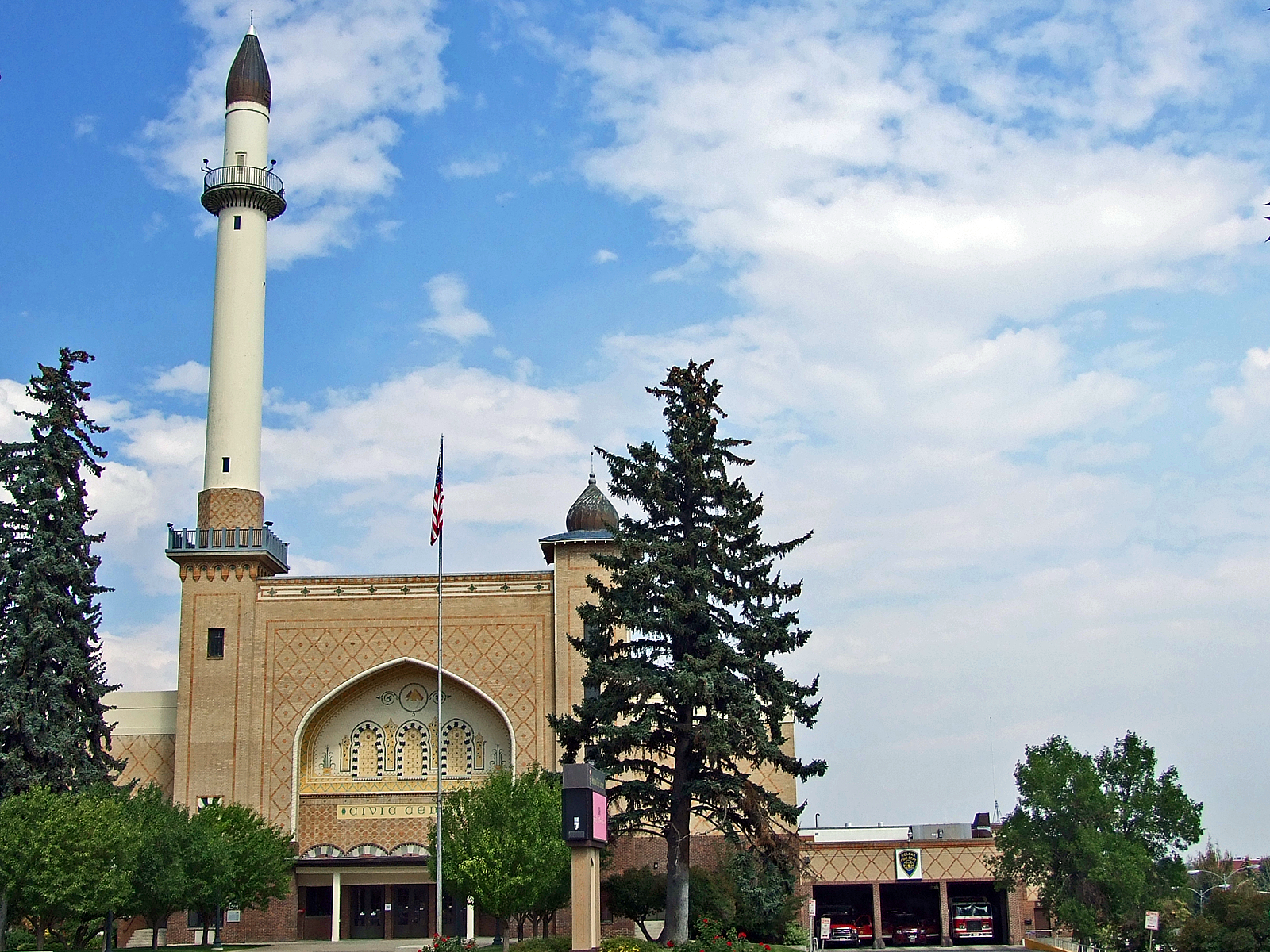
Algeria Shrine Temple, Helena, 1919.

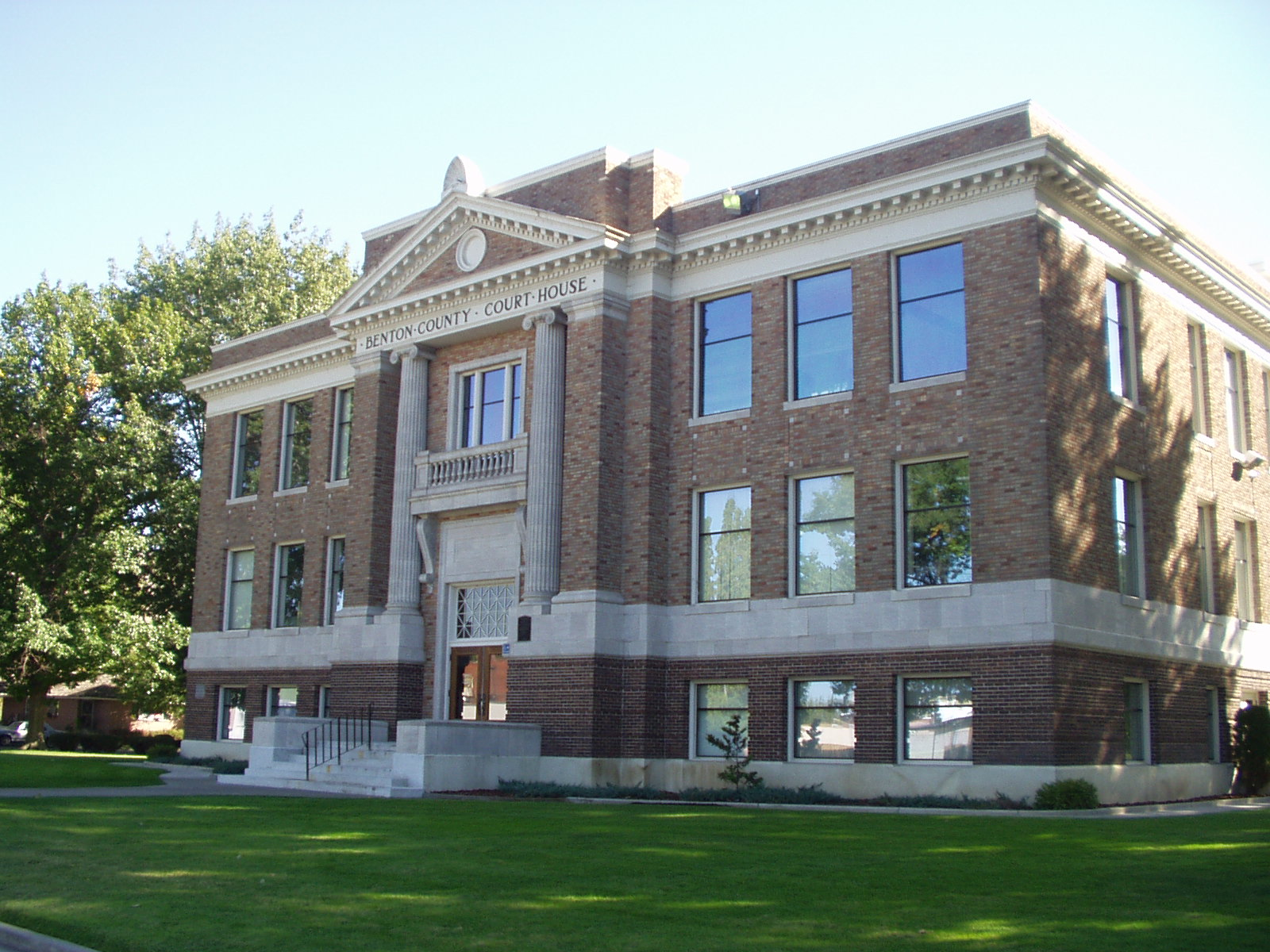
County Courthouse, Prosser, 1926.

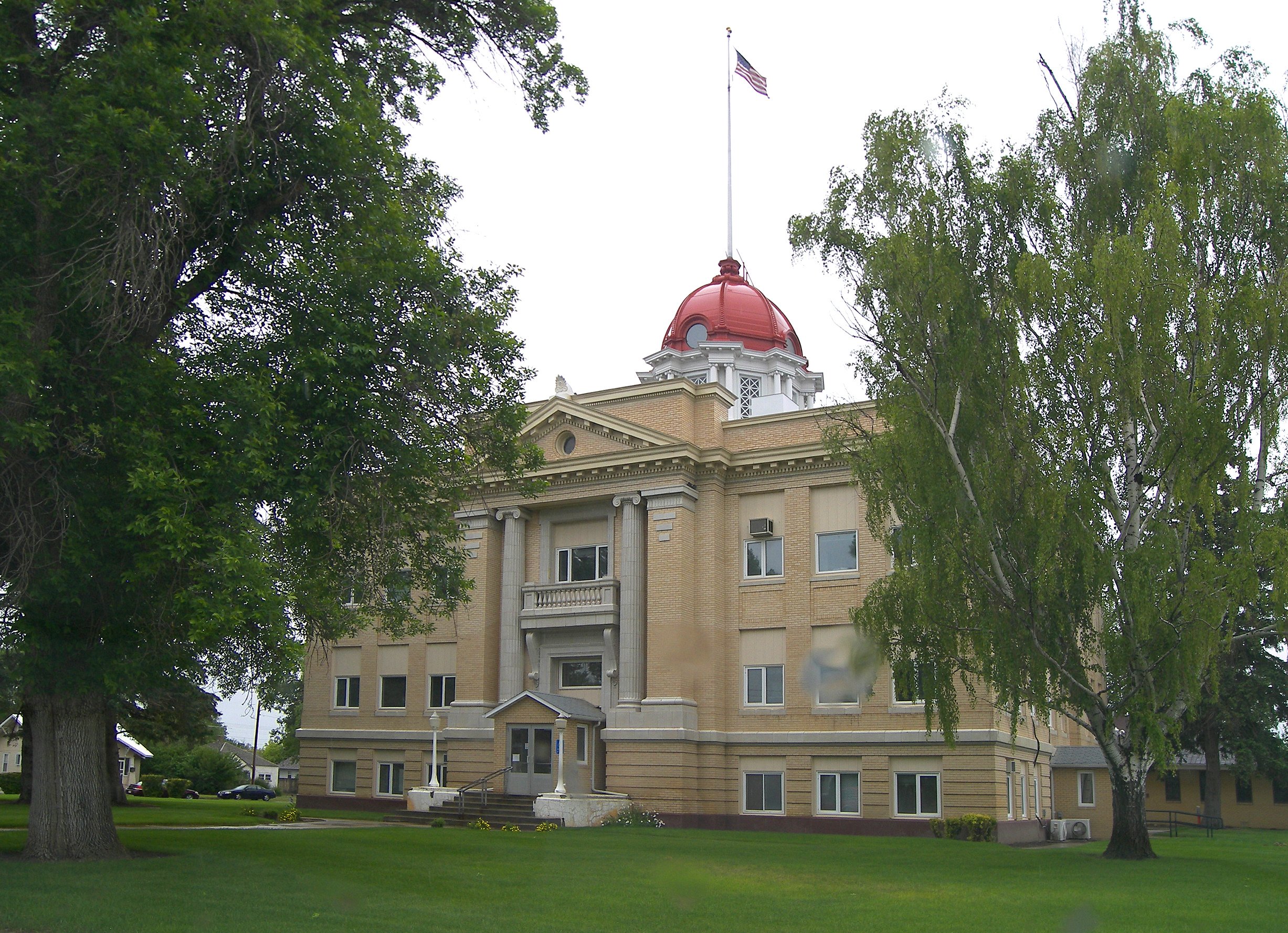
County Courthouse, Sidney, 1927.

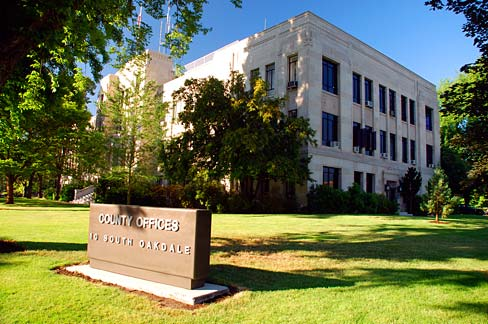
County Courthouse, Medford, 1931.

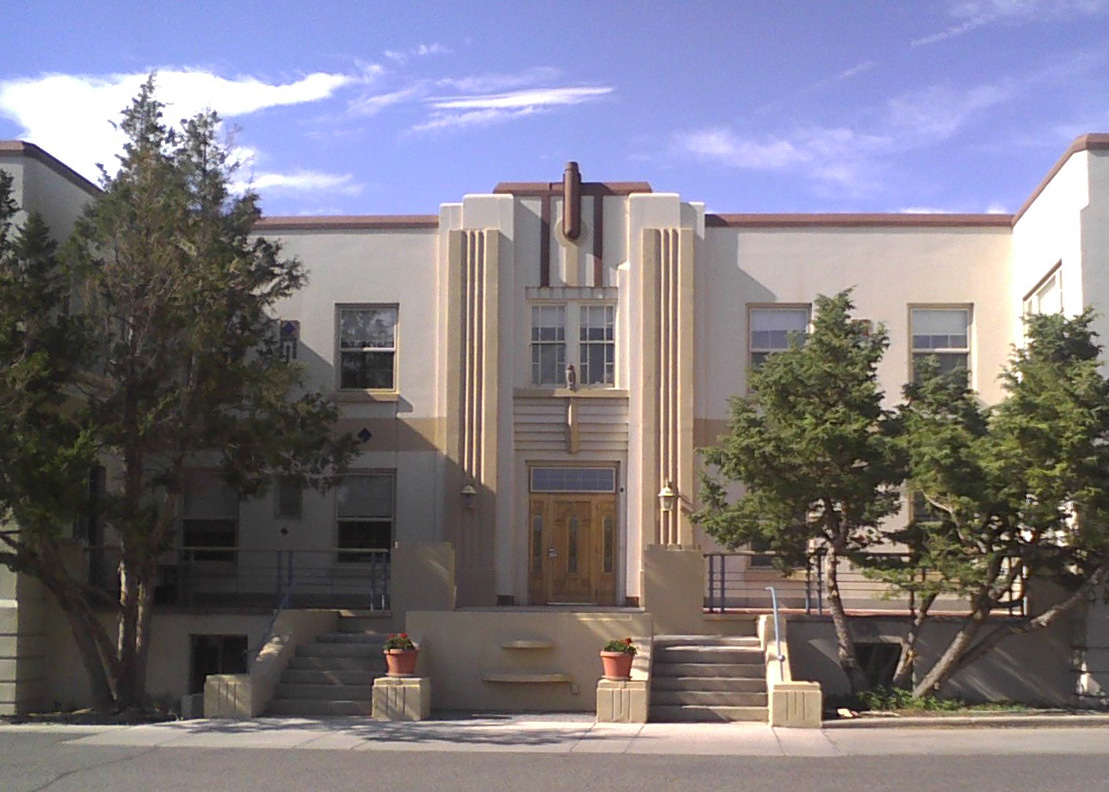
County Hospital, Helena, 1937.

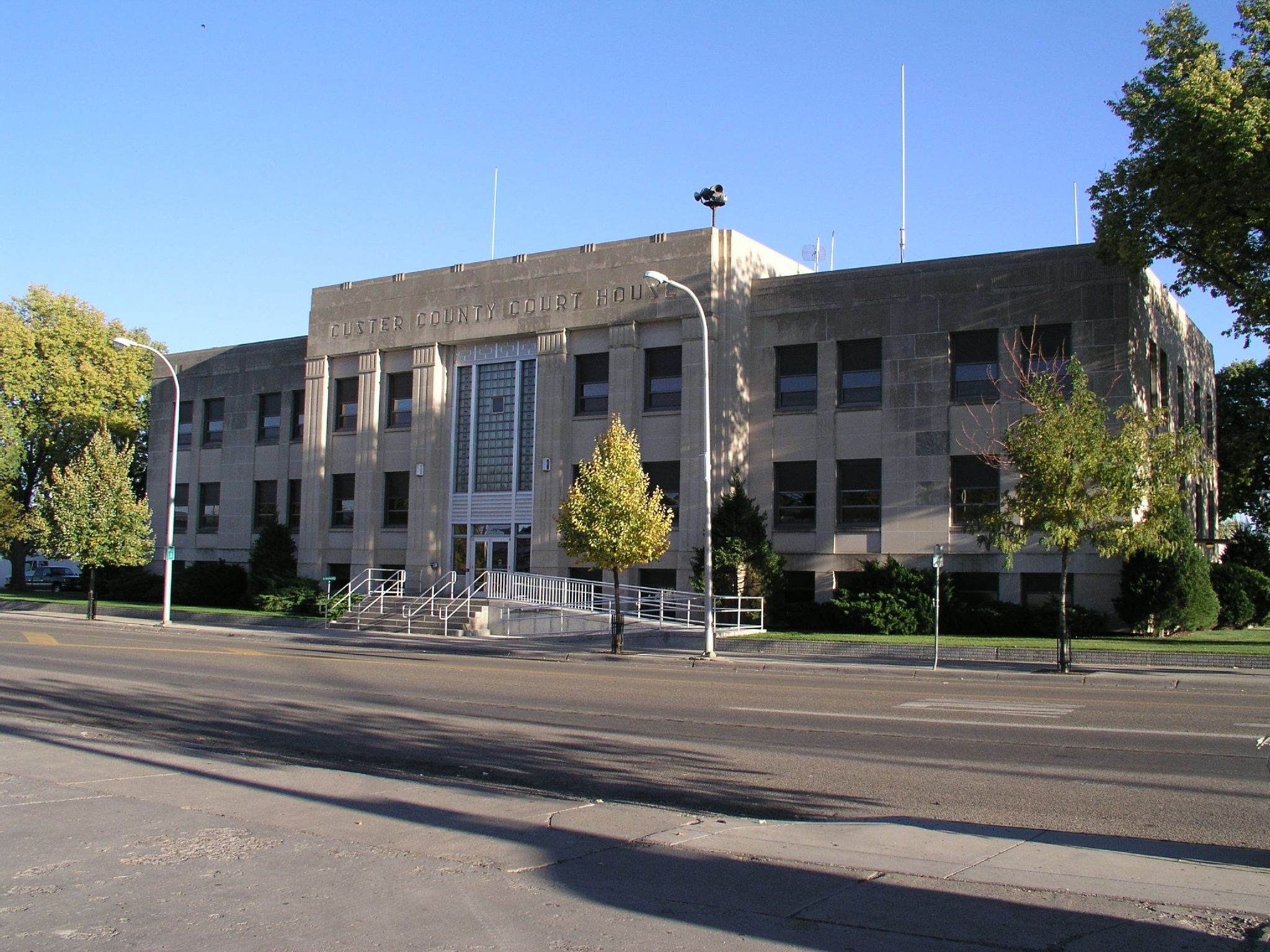
County Courthouse, Miles City, 1949.

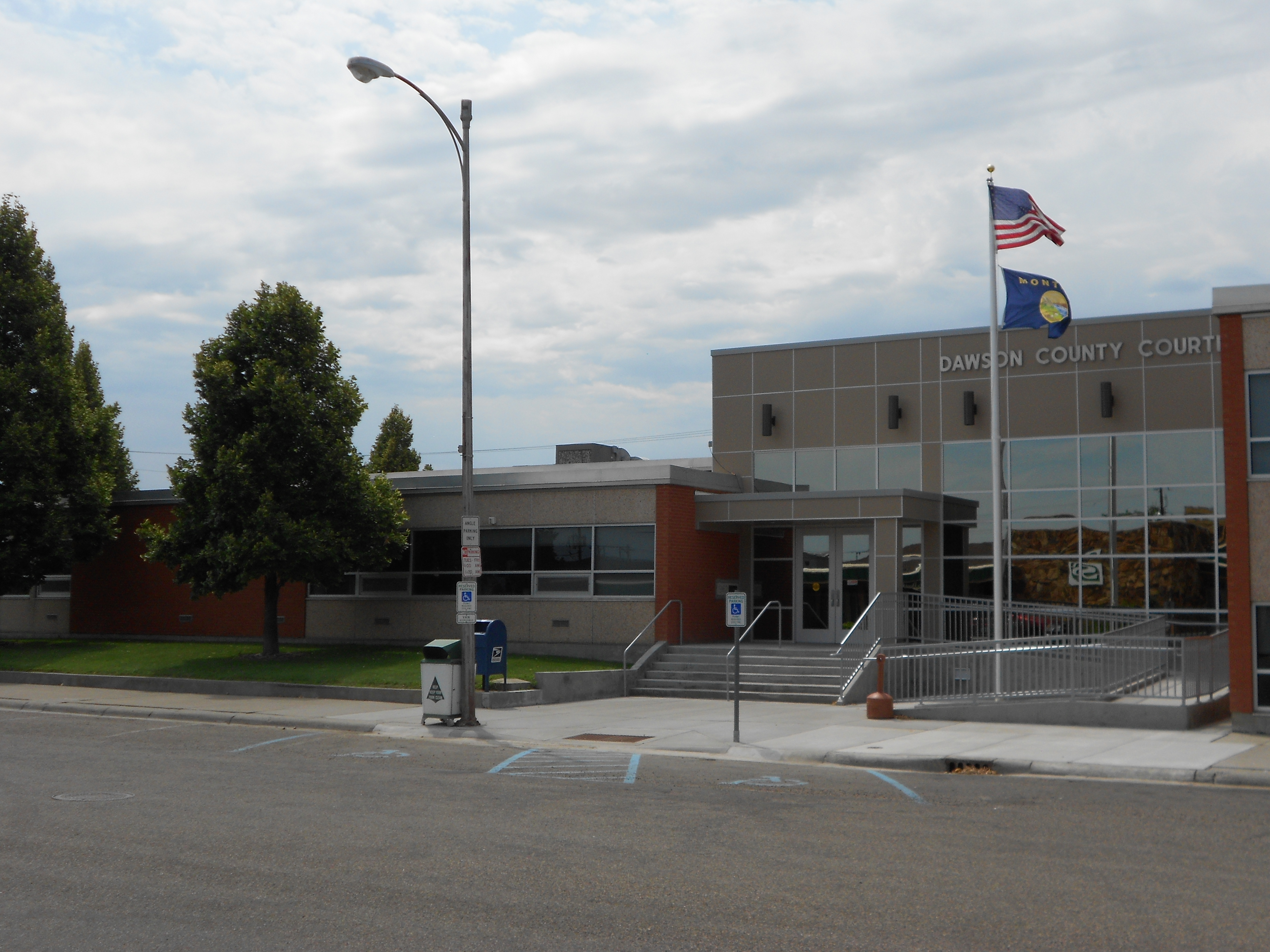
County Courthouse, Glendive, 1961.

Link & Haire was a prolific architectural firm in Montana, formally established on January 1, 1906. It designed a number of buildings that are listed on the National Register of Historic Places.

== History ==
The Link & Haire Firm was formed by Charles Haire and J. G. Link in 1906. Link & Haire architects planned both public and private premises. Thomas Haire, who succeeded Charles S. Haire, retired in 1926. E.B. Benson, an employee, took the place of Thomas Haire.

== Partner biographies ==
John Gustave Link was born in Bavaria on May 13, 1870, emigrating to the United States in 1887. He practiced architecture in Denver and St. Louis before relocating to Butte in 1896. He soon formed the partnership of Link & Donovan with William E. Donovan, which was dissolved in 1900. He then formed Link & Carter, with Joseph T. Carter. In 1902 Link went to Billings, a city 228 miles east of Butte, where he established the firm's second office, leaving the Butte office under Carter's supervision. After Carter departed in 1905, Link had to find a new architect to manage the Butte office. He found his man in the form of the older Charles S. Haire, a prominent Helena architect. The two men formally established their partnership on January 1, 1906, with Link in Billings and Haire in Butte.

Upon Haire's death in 1925, his place was taken by his son, Thomas. Link departed soon after, relocating to Spokane, Washington, where he established Link & Rasque with George M. Rasque. He returned to Billings in 1926, and his firm became J. G. Link, Inc. In 1935 Link's son John G. Link, Jr. was admitted to the firm. He retired in 1936, handing the firm over fully to his sons, John and Elmer F. Link. John G. Link, Sr. died in Billings in January 1954.

Charles Sidney Haire was born in Hamilton County, Ohio, on June 4, 1857. He attended Hughes High School in Cincinnati, graduating in 1876. It was in Ohio that he studied architecture, from 1879 to 1886. He then worked as a draftsman for the Union Pacific Railroad at Pocatello, Idaho, and the Great Northern Railway in Butte, ultimately relocating to Helena in 1893, where he established his own office. Haire practiced alone until he formed a partnership with J. G. Link in January 1906.

Haire was elected to the American Institute of Architects in 1921, and died February 3, 1925, in Olympia, Washington, while en route to Montana from California. At the time of his death, his last completed work, the Montana Life Insurance Building at Helena, was regarded as his greatest.

== Architectural works ==
=== Charles S. Haire, 1893-1905 ===
- 1896 - Montana State Soldiers' Home, Veterans Dr, Columbia Falls, Montana
- 1899 - St. Mary of the Assumption R. C. Church, Laurin Lp Rd, Laurin, Montana
- 1901 - Detention Hospital, Lewis and Clark County Hospital, 3404 Cooney Dr, Helena, Montana
- 1901 - First Unitarian Church, 325 N Park Ave, Helena, Montana
  - Now the Grandstreet Theatre
- 1901 - Parmly Billings Memorial Library, 2822 Montana Ave, Billings, Montana
- 1902 - Dillon City Library, 121 S Idaho St, Dillon, Montana
- 1902 - Silver Bow County Poor Farm Hospital, 3040 Continental Dr, Butte, Montana
- 1902 - Ursuline Convent of the Sacred Heart, 1411 Leighton Blvd, Miles City, Montana
- 1903 - Carnegie Library, 35 N Bozeman Ave, Bozeman, Montana

=== Link & Donovan, 1896-1900 ===
- 1898 - Largey Flats, 405 W Broadway St, Butte, Montana
- 1899 - Mountain View M. E. Church, 301 N Montana St, Butte, Montana

=== Link & Carter, 1900-1905 ===
- 1900 - Butte Miner Building, 69-71 W Broadway St, Butte, Montana
  - Demolished
- 1901 - Masonic Temple, 314 W Park St, Butte, Montana
- 1901 - Thornton Hotel, 65 E Broadway St, Butte, Montana
- 1902 - Billings City Hall, 2812 1st Ave N, Billings, Montana
  - Demolished
- 1902 - Kohrs Memorial Library, 501 Missouri Ave, Deer Lodge, Montana
- 1902 - Austin North House, 622 N 29th St, Billings, Montana
- 1903 - Montana Building, Louisiana Purchase Exposition, St. Louis, Missouri
  - Demolished in 1904
- 1904 - Ignatius D. O'Donnell House, 105 Clark Ave, Billings, Montana
- 1905 - Stapleton Block, 104 N Broadway, Billings, Montana
- 1906 - St. Patrick's Catholic Church, Billings, Montana (J.G. Link Project)

=== Link & Haire, 1906-1925 ===
- 1907 - Main Hall (West Wing), Montana State Normal School, Dillon, Montana
- 1908 - Adams Hotel, 1 Main St, Lavina, Montana
- 1908 - Bank of Commerce Building, 158 N 9th Ave, Forsyth, Montana
- 1908 - Post Office Building, 14 N 7th St, Miles City, Montana
- 1908 - Terry Grade School, Towne Ave, Terry, Montana
- 1909 - Elks Building, 112 N Pattee St, Missoula, Montana
- 1909 - Burr Fisher House, 712 S Willson Ave, Bozeman, Montana
- 1909 - Masonic Temple, North 28th Street and Third Avenue, Billings, Montana.
- 1909 - Masonic Temple, 120—136 E Broadway Ave, Missoula, Montana
- 1910 - First National Bank Building, 519 Main St, Miles City, Montana
- 1910 - Holy Rosary Hospital, 310 N. Jordan Ave, Miles City, Montana
- 1910 - John M. Keith House, 1110 Gerald Ave, Missoula, Montana
- 1910 - Masonic Temple, 2806 3rd Ave N, Billings, Montana
- 1912 - Cell Block No. 1, Montana State Prison, 925 Main St, Deer Lodge, Montana
- 1912 - Granite County Courthouse, 220 N Sansome St, Philipsburg, Montana
- 1913 - Carnegie Library, 314 McLeod St, Big Timber, Montana
- 1913 - Rosebud County Courthouse, 1250 Main St, Forsyth, Montana
- 1914 - Montana Power Building, 113-115 Broadway, Billings, Montana
- 1916 - Fallon County Jail, 723 S Main St, Baker, Montana
- 1916 - John C. Huntoon House, 722 W Water St, Lewistown, Montana
- 1916 - Rundle Building, 208 5th St S, Glasgow, Montana
- 1916 - St. Leo's R. C. Church, 124 W Broadway, Lewistown, Montana
- 1919 - Algeria Shrine Temple, 340 Neill Ave, Helena, Montana
- 1921 - Mausoleum at the Mountview cemetery, Billings, Montana.
- 1923 - Montana Life Insurance Building, 404 Fuller Ave, Helena, Montana
- 1923 - Sundance School, 108 N 4th St, Sundance, Wyoming
- 1924 - Renovations to Lake Hotel, Yellowstone National Park. (Grand Lady of the Lake: The Remarkable Legacy of Yellowstone's Lake Hotel By Michelle Tappen)
- 1924 - Machine Shop and Storage Garage, Yellowstone National Park, Gardiner, Montana

=== Link & Rasque, 1925-1926 ===
- 1926 - Benton County Courthouse, 620 Market St, Prosser, Washington

=== J. G. Link, Inc., 1926-1935 ===
- 1927 - Richland County Courthouse, 201 W Main St, Sidney, Montana
- 1931 - Jackson County Courthouse, 10 S Oakdale Ave, Medford, Oregon
- 1932 - Administration Building, Montana State Prison, 925 Main St, Deer Lodge, Montana
- 1935 - Industrial Building, Montana State Prison, 925 Main St, Deer Lodge, Montana

=== J. G. Link & Son Company, 1935-1936 ===
- 1935 - Nurses' Home, St. Luke's Hospital, 1000 Fountain Ter Dr, Lewistown, Montana
- 1936 - Washakie County Courthouse, 1001 Big Horn Ave, Worland, Wyoming

=== J. G. Link & Company, from 1936 ===
- 1936 - Big Horn County Courthouse, 121 3rd St W, Hardin, Montana
- 1937 - Main Building, Lewis and Clark County Hospital, 3404 Cooney Dr, Helena, Montana
- 1939 - Musselshell County Courthouse, 506 Main St, Roundup, Montana
- 1946 - Billings Gas Building, 2603 2nd Ave N, Billings, Montana
  - Demolished
- 1948 - St. Jude Thaddeus R. C. School, 430 7th Ave, Havre, Montana
- 1949 - Butte Civic Center, 1340 Harrison Ave, Butte, Montana
- 1949 - Custer County Courthouse, 1010 Main St, Miles City, Montana
- 1949 - McCone County Courthouse, 1004 C Ave, Circle, Montana
- 1950 - Granite County Hospital, 310 S Sansome St, Philipsburg, Montana
- 1951 - Education Building, Eastern Montana College, Billings, Montana
  - Demolished in the 1980s
- 1954 - A. J. M. Johnson Hall, Montana State University, Bozeman, Montana
- 1954 - North and South Dormitories, Montana Training School, Boulder, Montana
- 1961 - Dawson County Courthouse, 207 W Bell St, Glendive, Montana
- 1962 - U. S. Federal Building (Old), 316 N 26th St, Billings, Montana
