= Sundance School =

- U.S. National Register of Historic Places
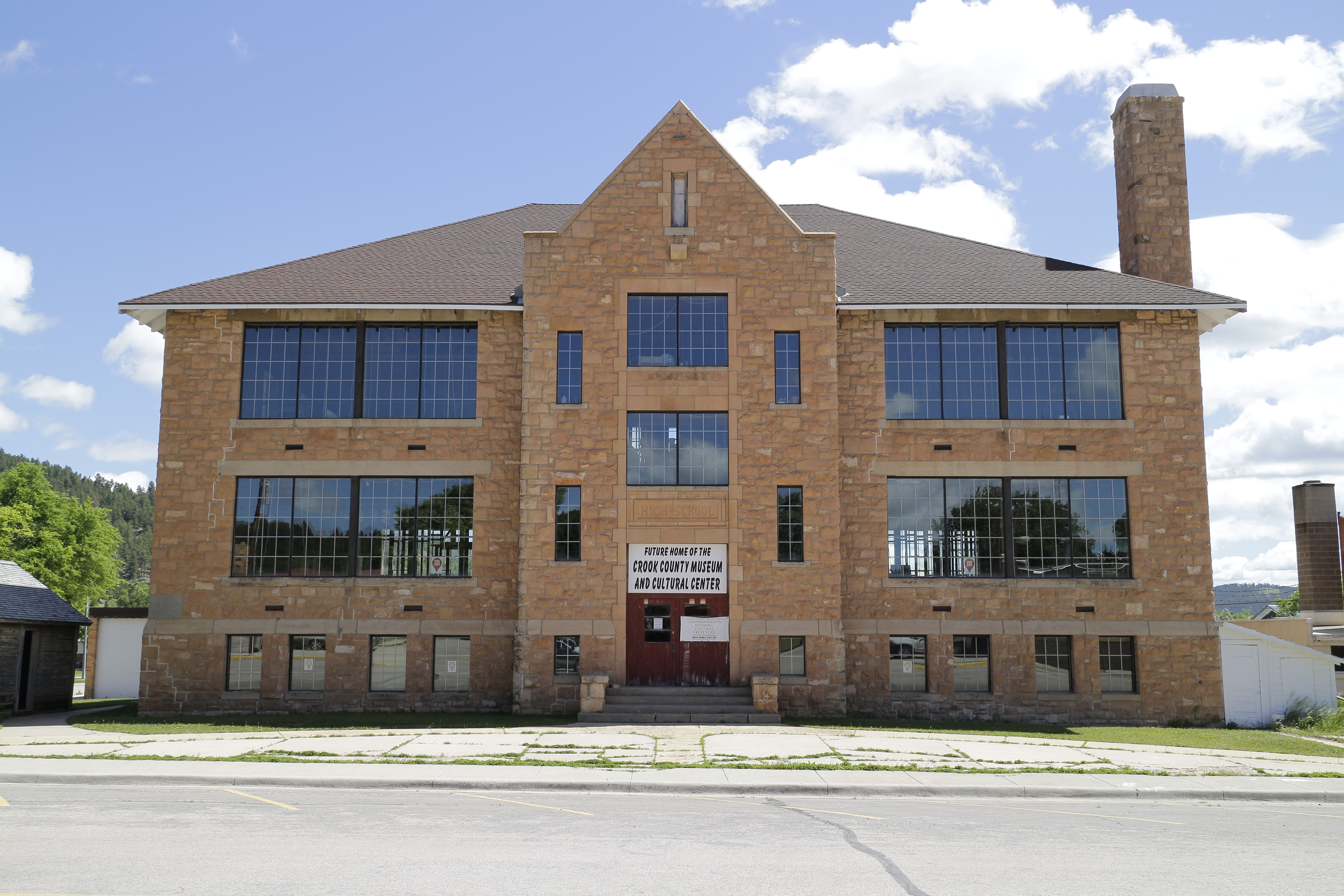

- Location within Wyoming Location within the United States
- Location: 108 N. Fourth St., Sundance, Wyoming
- Coordinates: 44°24′22″N 104°22′38″W
- Area: 1.9 acres (0.77 ha)
- Built: 1923
- Architect: Link & Haire
- NRHP reference No.: 85003099
- Added to NRHP: December 02, 1985

The Sundance School, also known as Old Stoney, was built in 1923 in Sundance, Wyoming to serve both the elementary and the high school students of Crook County School District #1. The two-story sandstone building is one of the largest buildings in Sundance. It served the community as a school until 1971.

The school measures about 57 feet (17 m) by 89 feet (27 m) on a raised basement story, with two principal stories and an attic under a steep cross-gabled roof. It had its own electrical generating plant in the basement, fueled by coal. The basement also featured the toilet rooms and play rooms. The first floor had four classrooms, a laboratory, a domestic science room, two commercial rooms and an assembly room. The stone is buff-colored Minnelusa sandstone from a quarry 4 miles (6.4 km) distant. Construction was by the Marshall Engineer Company of Deadwood, South Dakota; the architects were Link & Haire of Billings, Montana.

The Sundance School was listed on the National Register of Historic Places in 1985.
