= Montana State Training School Historic District =

Historic district in Montana, United States

- U.S. National Register of Historic Places
- U.S. Historic district

- Location within Montana Location within the United States
- Location: Roughly bounded by Montana Highway 69, Riverside Road, and the Boulder River, Boulder, Montana
- Coordinates: 46.227797°N 112.119280°W
- Area: 30.86 acres (12.49 ha)
- Architect: Link & Haire, Norman J. Hamill
- NRHP reference No.: 14000957
- Added to NRHP: November 24, 2014

The Montana State Training School Historic District was listed on the National Register of Historic Places in 2014. It is a complex of buildings set around an oval green and a central administrative building named Griffin Hall. Griffin Hall was built in 1912 and is the oldest building. Many former buildings of the complex were demolished in the 1970s and 1980s.

It has also been known as the Deaf and Dumb Asylum, as the State School for Deaf, Blind, and Backward Children, as the Boulder River School and Hospital, and as the Montana Developmental Center, and it has been denoted by 24JF1991. It includes 13 contributing buildings, a contributing structure, and a contributing object, as well as three non-contributing sites.

It is associated with architects Link & Haire and Norman J. Hamill.
