= Masonic Lodge (Missoula, Montana) =

- Downtown Masonic Temple
- U.S. National Register of Historic Places
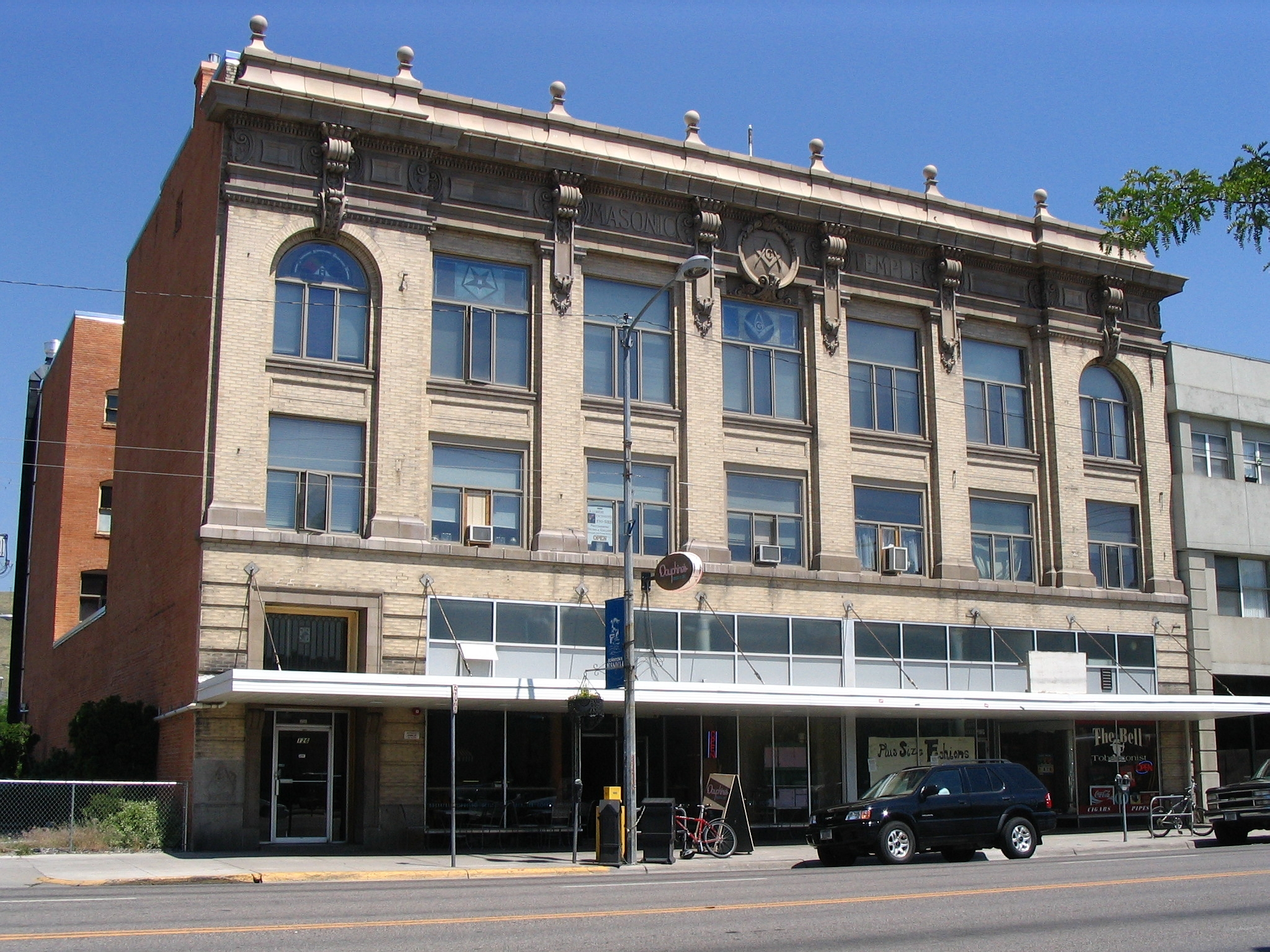

- Location within Montana Location within the United States
- Location: 120–136 E. Broadway Ave., Missoula, Montana
- Coordinates: 46°52′19″N 113°59′32″W
- Area: less than one acre
- Built: 1909
- Architect: Link & Haire
- Architectural style: Beaux Arts
- MPS: Missoula MPS
- NRHP reference No.: 90000649
- Added to NRHP: April 30, 1990

The Masonic Lodge in Missoula, Montana, is a Beaux Arts building built in 1909. It was listed on the National Register of Historic Places in 1990.

== History ==
The property was originally owned by Hugh Forbis, president of the Forbis-Toole Company (an investment company that handled farm loans, mortgages, and irrigation bonds. The company had offices in the building). Ownership stayed in the Forbis family until the Masonic Temple Association purchased the property in 1954.

Since construction, the building has been home to Masonic activities of all kinds including all three of Missoula's Masonic Lodges: Missoula Lodge #13, Harmony Lodge #49 and Sentinel Lodge #155 A.F&A.M. Also The Scottish Rite, York Rite, Eastern Star, Job's Daughters, DeMolay, Daughter's of the Nile and Rainbow Girls meet at the Temple at various times each month. The Masonic Lodge has an impressive meeting room on the third floor as well as a dining room/ kitchen and billiard hall.

Other tenants of the building have included commercial businesses, a Church, barber shop, tea company, a few restaurants, offices and even a business college. Montana Power Company occupied the building for several decades beginning in the 1920s.

The building was designed by Link and Haire, Montana's most prolific early twentieth century architectural firm. John Espy, PhD an internationally known psychotherapist has been practicing in the Masonic Temple building offices for more than 25 years.

== See also ==
- National Register of Historic Places listings in Missoula County, Montana
