= Ursuline Convent of the Sacred Heart =

- U.S. National Register of Historic Places
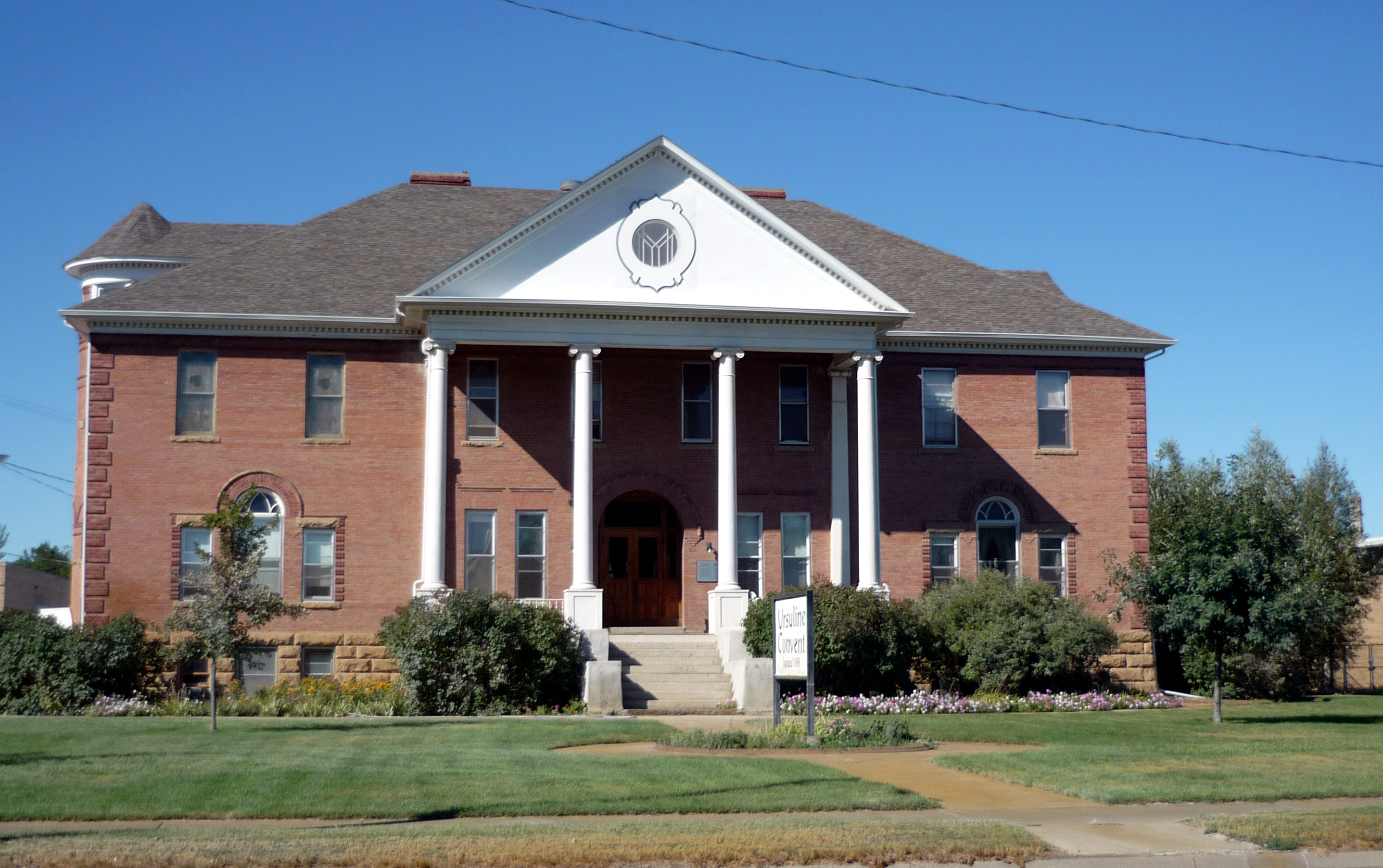

- Location within Montana Location within the United States
- Location: 1411 Leighton Blvd., Miles City, Montana
- Coordinates: 46°24′44″N 105°50′32″W
- Area: less than one acre
- Built: 1902
- Architect: Charles S. Haire
- Architectural style: Colonial Revival
- NRHP reference No.: 92000115
- Added to NRHP: March 5, 1992

The Ursuline Convent of the Sacred Heart is a National Registered Historic Place located in Miles City, Montana. It has also been known as Sacred Heart Convent, Ursuline Academy, was added to the Register on March 5, 1992.

The Ursuline convent opened on January 18, 1884. The original building was destroyed in a fire in 1897. The new convent was completed in 1902, designed by Helena architect Charles S. Haire. Sisters taught at the convent until 1978. It then became a mental health center. Currently it is used as a community center.

According to its NRHP nomination, the building "has long been a landmark building in eastern Montana. The convent marks the Ursulines' important role in establishing early institutions of learning in Montana, and especially their commitment to providing educational opportunities for children in Montana. The building is additionally the earliest known example of the work of Charles S. Haire, a prolific turn-of-the-century architect who designed many prominent buildings in Miles City. It is a highly significant building, in a local and statewide context...."
