= Benton County Courthouse (Washington) =

Historic building in Washington, United States

- U.S. National Register of Historic Places
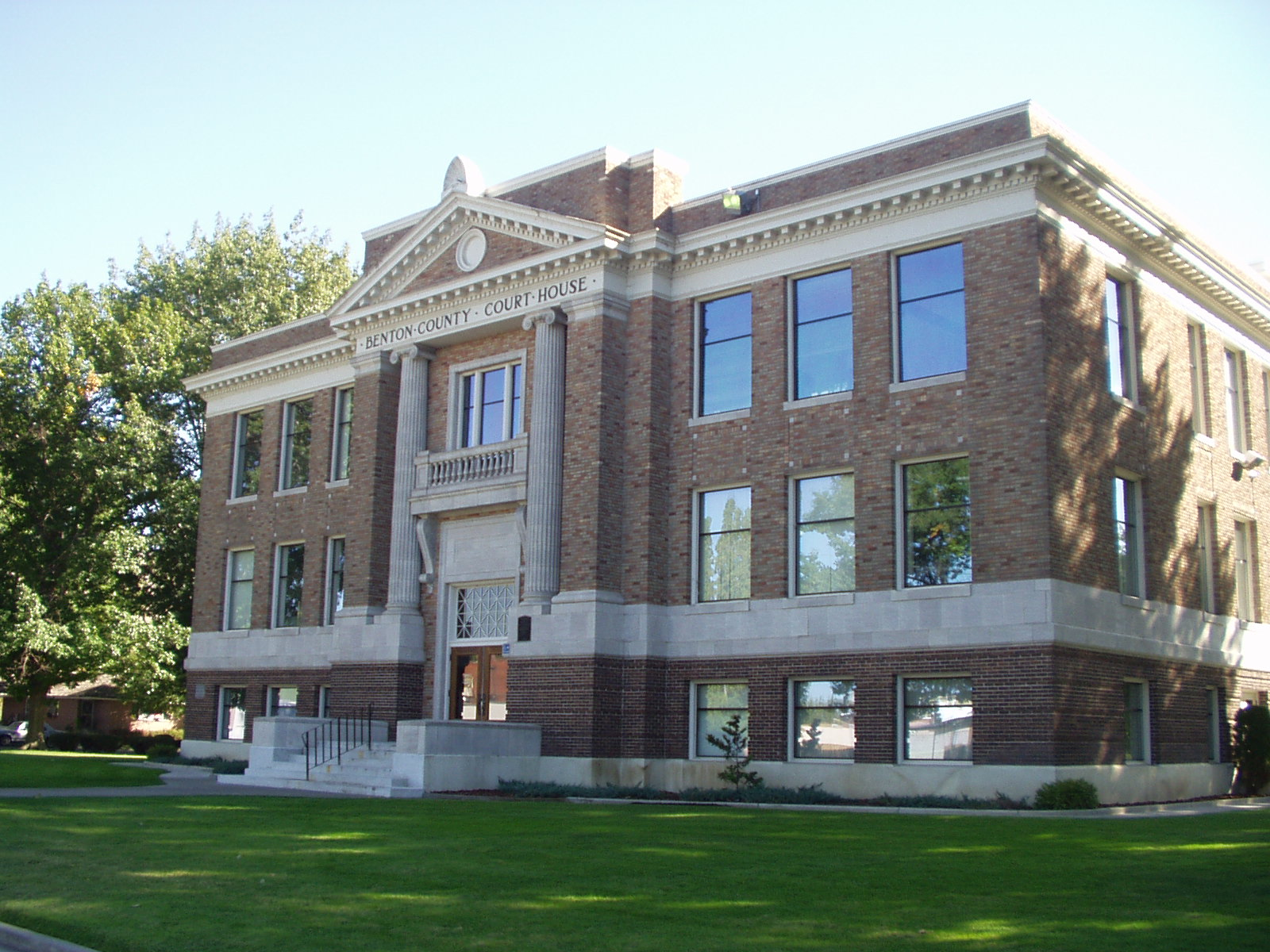
- Benton County Courthouse, Prosser, WA

- Location within Washington (state) Location within the United States
- Location: Market St, Prosser
- Coordinates: 46°12′13″N 119°46′14″W
- Built: 1926
- Architect: George Rasquil
- Architectural style: Neoclassical Revival
- NRHP reference No.: 76001869
- Added to NRHP: 1976

The Benton County Courthouse is a Neoclassical Revival courthouse located in Prosser, Washington, and serving Benton County. The building was constructed in 1926 to serve as a permanent courthouse in Benton County. From the creation of the county in 1905 until its construction, court had been held in various hotels in Prosser. The building also helped establish Prosser as the county seat over nearby Kennewick.

The courthouse is an example of Neoclassical Revival architecture, featuring a central portico and facade on the front of the building, flanked by ionic columns and adjoining brick pilasters. The original cost of construction was over $100,000. It was added to the National Register of Historic Places in 1976.
