= List of museums in Montana =

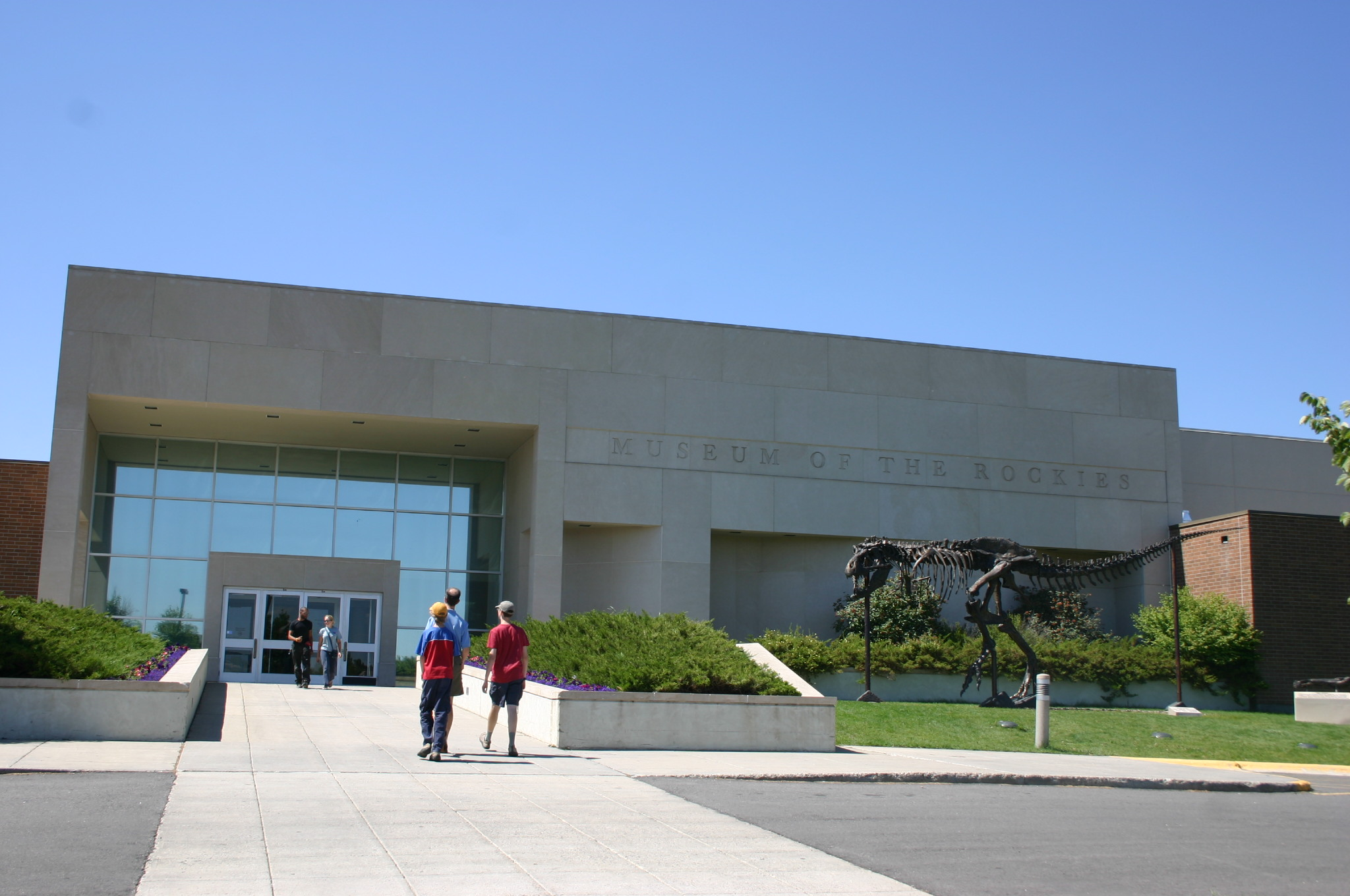
Museum of the Rockies in Bozeman

This list of museums in Montana encompasses museums which are defined for this context as institutions (including nonprofit organizations, government entities, and private businesses) that collect and care for objects of cultural, artistic, scientific, or historical interest and make their collections or related exhibits available for public viewing. Museums that exist only in cyberspace (i.e., virtual museums) are not included.

The six areas referred to in the "Region" column are explained in a separate section below.

Montana has an unusual number of paleontology museums and museums with paleontology sections, much of them filled with discoveries from within the state. These museums are listed again in a separate table below with more specific information.

== Museums ==
This list is a sortable table. Click on the small boxes next to any heading title to reorder the list (in alphabetical order or reverse alphabetical order) by that category.

Name	Town/City	County	Region	Type	Summary
American Computer & Robotics Museum	Bozeman	Gallatin	South central	Computer	History of computing, communications, artificial intelligence & robotics
Archie Bray Foundation for the Ceramic Arts	Helena	Lewis and Clark	Southwest	Art	Exhibitions of contemporary ceramic art
Bair Family Museum	Martinsdale	Meagher	North central	Historic house	website, ranch home of Charles M. Bair family, features antiques, Native American and Western art, ranching display
Beaverhead County Museum	Dillon	Beaverhead	Southwest	Local history	website, natural, physical and human history of Beaverhead County, includes fossils, military artifacts, textiles, household items, miniature railroad, mining and farming equipment, a general store, schoolroom and railroad pocket watch exhibit
Belt Museum	Belt	Cascade	North Central	Local history	In the old jail building. Jail cell, coal mine reproductions, photos, local artists.
Big Horn County Historical Museum	Hardin	Big Horn	Southeast	Open-air	website, includes over 25 historic buildings, farm equipment, horse-drawn wagons and antique vehicles, operated by the Big Horn County Historical Society
Big Sandy Historical Museum	Big Sandy	Chouteau	North Central	Local history	Early pioneer ranching days, genealogy information
Blaine County Museum	Chinook	Blaine	Northeast	Local history	website, local history, culture, Native Americans, dinosaurs and fossils
Blaine County Wildlife Museum	Chinook	Blaine	Northeast	Natural history	website, open summer, over 200 animals on display, past and present Montana wildlife
Brand Bar Museum	Ovando	Powell	Southwest	Local history	Local memorabilia, stories of settlers
Broadwater County Museum	Townsend	Broadwater	Southwest	Local history	website, open seasonally
Canton Church Historic Site	Townsend	Broadwater	Southwest	Religious	1870s Catholic Church, first built in the area
Carbon County Historical Society Museum	Red Lodge	Carbon	South central	Local history	website, Native Americans, cowboys, rodeo, mining, ranching and homesteading
Carter County Museum	Ekalaka	Carter	Southeast	Multiple	Local history, Native American, homesteaders, dinosaurs, fossils, geology, natural history
Cascade Senior Center and Museum	Cascade	Cascade	North Central	Local history	Photographs, business machines, military
Castle Museum	White Sulphur Springs	Meagher	North central	History	Late 19th-century mansion with period furniture, minerals, textiles, historic artifacts, carriages and sleds, a bank, a schoolroom, a stagecoach, fire engines
Central Montana Museum	Lewistown	Fergus	North central	Multiple	website, local history, culture, Native Americans, mining, petroleum, military history, dinosaurs, open seasonally
Cheyenne Indian Museum	Ashland	Rosebud	Southeast	History	website, located in St. Labre Indian Mission, artifacts and collectibles from the Plains Tribes
Children's Museum of Montana, Inc	Great Falls	Cascade	Central	tactile exploration	website, focus is cognitive development through interactive exhibits to inspire a passion for lifelong learning.
Children’s Museum Missoula	Missoula	Missoula	Northwest	Children's	website, interactive exhibits for children
Children's Museum of Bozeman	Bozeman	Gallatin	South central	Children's	website
Children's Museum of Northeast Montana	Glasgow	Valley	Northeast	Children's	website
Clark Chateau	Butte	Silver Bow	Southwest	Multiple	website, 1898 mansion
Clarks Fork Valley Museum	Fromberg	Carbon	South central	Local history	In railroad depot, replicas
C. M. Russell Museum Complex	Great Falls	Cascade	North central	Art	Focus is the artwork of local "cowboy artist" Charles Marion Russell and art about the American Old West
Conrad Mansion Museum	Kalispell	Flathead	Northwest	Historic house	website; 1895 Norman-style mansion built by trading and freighting magnate and Kalispell founder Charles Conrad; has 26 originally furnished rooms, Tiffany-style windows
Conrad Transportation and Historical Museum	Conrad	Pondera	North central	History / Transportation	Open seasonally, features a period drug store, general store, recreated homestead shack, exhibits about the development of the west through transportation, toys, automobiles and artifacts
Cooke City Montana Museum	Cooke City	Park	South central	Local history	website, Beartooth Pass, tourism, local communities
Copper King Mansion	Butte	Silver Bow	Southwest	Historic house	Guided tours of the late Victorian mansion
Copper Village Museum & Arts Center	Anaconda	Deer Lodge	Southwest	Multiple	Located in the Anaconda City Hall Cultural Center, exhibitions of art, local history and culture
Crail Ranch Homestead Museum	Big Sky	Gallatin	South central	Homestead	website The museum is housed in two original homestead cabins and displays artifacts, photographs and documents pertaining to the homestead era in the Big Sky area. Docents offer extensive information about the pioneer Crail and Creek families.
Crazy Mountain Museum	Big Timber	Sweet Grass	South central	Local history	website
Culbertson Museum	Culbertson	Roosevelt	Northeast	History	website, open seasonally, local history, historic room and business displays, tractors, horse-drawn equipment, cowboy pioneer and homesteader artifacts
Custer Battlefield Museum	Garryowen	Big Horn	Southeast	History	website, Battle of the Little Bighorn, frontiersmen, military life, Plains Indian culture
Daly Mansion	Hamilton	Ravalli	Southwest	Historic house	website, home of 19th century industrialist Marcus Daly, includes an arboretum and botanical garden
Daniels County Museum & Pioneer Town	Scobey	Daniels	Northeast	Living history	website, includes over 30 historic buildings restored to depict a town in the early 1900s
Darby Pioneer Memorial Museum	Darby	Ravalli	Northwest	Local history	Collection of pioneer home and work artifacts
Darby Ranger Station Visitor Center and Museum	Darby	Ravalli	Northwest	History	website, open seasonally, history of the Forest Service and its evolving mission, located in the Bitterroot National Forest
Dumas Brothel	Butte	Silver Bow	Southwest	History	Former brothel dating back to 1890
Earth Science Museum	Loma	Chouteau	North central	Local history, Natural history	Gems, minerals, fossils and Native American artifacts discovered in the area
Fly Fishing Discovery Center	Livingston	Park	South central	Sports - Fly fishing	Operated by the Federation of Fly Fishers, fly fishing ties, rods, reels, lines, float tubes, art
Fort Benton Museums	Fort Benton	Choteau	North central	Multiple	website, includes Old Fort Benton, a reconstructed 1850s fur trading post; Starr Gallery of Western Art; Museum of the Northern Great Plains about homesteaders' lives and agriculture; Homestead Village, a 1900s period rural community including a church, bank, drug store, City Hall, one room school, a mercantile and three generations of prairie settler's dwellings; Museum of the Upper Missouri about area explorations, transportation and local history; and Upper Missouri River Breaks National Monument Interpretive Center
Fort Owen State Park	Stevensville	Ravalli	Southwest	Military	Partially restored fort and museum
Fort Peck Interpretive Center	Fort Peck	Valley	Northeast	Natural history	Native fish and game species of Fort Peck Lake and the Charles M. Russell National Wildlife Refuge, construction of Fort Peck Dam and powerhouse tours
Frank Derosa Railroad Museum	Havre	Hill	North central	History	Model railroad, equipment
Frontier Gateway Museum	Glendive	Dawson	Southwest	Local history	website, open seasonally, dinosaurs and fossils, buffalo, Indians, homesteaders, cattlemen, settlers, railroad, Civil War, two country stores, a blacksmith shop, buggy shed, a fire hall, log cabin, a restored country school, and farm machinery
Frontier Montana Museum	Deer Lodge	Powell	Southwest	History	website, collection of handguns, spurs, chaps and cowboy collectibles, open seasonally
Galerie Trinitas	Great Falls	Cascade	North central	Art	Part of the University of Great Falls, religious art and the art of Sister Trinitas Morin
Garfield County Museum	Jordan	Garfield	Northeast	History	website, local history, culture, dinosaurs and fossils
Gallatin History Museum	Bozeman	Gallatin	South central	Local history	website, operated by the Gallatin County Historical Society in a former jail, exhibits include jail cells and a hanging gallows, Native American history in the Gallatin Valley, clothing, a reconstructed log cabin, guns
Glacier County Historical Museum	Cut Bank	Glacier	Southwest	Local history	Open seasonally, exhibits include homesteading, Lewis & Clark, the artist John Clark, community businesses, oil, and Cut Bank 1898 through the 1960, an oil worker's house, oil derrick, 1917 schoolhouse, 1980s caboose, replica homestead house and farm
Glendive Dinosaur and Fossil Museum	Glendive	Dawson	Southwest	Religious	website, creationist view of dinosaurs and fossils, operated by the Foundation Advancing Creation Truth
Granite County Museum & Cultural Center	Philipsburg	Granite	Southwest	Local history	website, open seasonally, includes the Ghost Town Hall of Fame, exhibits on area silver mining, located in the historic Courtney Hotel
Grant–Kohrs Ranch National Historic Site	Deer Lodge	Powell	Southwest	Open-air	Tours of the working cattle ranch, 19th-century ranch house, historic bunkhouse, barn with collection of wagons and buggies, granary, draft horse barn, ice house and other outbuildings
Great Plains Dinosaur Museum and Field Station	Malta	Phillips	Northeast	Natural history	Dinosaurs, fossils, hosts paleontology digs, open seasonally
Grizzly & Wolf Discovery Center	West Yellowstone	Gallatin	South central	Natural history	Exhibits and live bears and wolves
H. Earl Clack Memorial Museum	Havre	Hill	North central	Local history	Local history, culture, dinosaurs, fossils
Headwaters Heritage Museum	Three Forks	Gallatin	South central	History	website, Lewis and Clark, mining, early settlers
Heritage Museum	Libby	Lincoln	Northwest	Local history	website, open seasonally
Historic St. Mary's Mission	Stevensville	Ravalli	Southwest	History	Mid 19th century mission complex
Historical Museum at Fort Missoula	Missoula	Missoula	Northwest	Local history	website, city history
The History Museum & Research Center	Great Falls	Cascade	North central	History	website
Hobson Museum	Hobson	Judith Basin	North central	Local history	
Hockaday Museum of Art	Kalispell	Flathead	Northwest	Art	website, housed in a former Carnegie library, permanent exhibit of Glacier National Park art and culture, changing exhibitions of nationally renowned and emerging artists
Holt Heritage Museum	Lolo	Missoula	Northwest	West	Open by appointment, collection of cowboy and Native American artifacts
Holter Museum of Art	Helena	Lewis and Clark	Southwest	Art	website, exhibits of contemporary art
Huntley Project Museum	Osborn	Yellowstone	Central	Agriculture	website, farming, ranching, and homesteading during the early 20th century
J. Spencer Watkins Memorial Museum	Virginia City	Madison	Southwest	History	Pharmacy, 1st soda fountain in Montana, print shop
Jefferson County Museum	Clancy	Jefferson	Southwest	Local history	website documents, maps, photos, rotating exhibits, rotating exhibits
Jefferson Valley Museum	Whitehall	Jefferson	Southwest	Local history	Open seasonally
Judith Basin County Museum	Stanford	Judith Basin	North central	Local history	Open seasonally
Larue-Hot Springs Museum	Hot Springs	Sanders	Northwest	Local history	website
Legacy Doll Museum	Billings	Yellowstone	Southeast	Doll	website, antique, collectible, and modern dolls and doll accessories
Lewis and Clark National Historic Trail Interpretive Center	Great Falls	Cascade	North central	History	website, managed by the USDA Forest Service, history of Lewis and Clark Expedition as they portaged the great falls of the Missouri River and explored the 'unknown'
Liberty County Museum	Chester	Liberty	North central	Local history	Located in a former Episcopal Methodist church
Little Bear School House Museum	Gallatin Gateway	Gallatin	South central	Local history	School house replica, Gallatin Gateway Inn, collections
Livingston Depot Center	Livingston	Park	South central	Railroad	Open seasonally, housed in a 1902 Northern Pacific station servicing Yellowstone; railroad artifacts, photos, art
Mai Wah Museum	Butte	Silver Bow	Southwest	Ethnic	History of Asian-Americans in the Butte area
Makoshika State Park	Glendive	Dawson	Southwest	Paleontology	Montana's largest state park has dinosaur fossil remains, visitor center at the park entrance has exhibits explaining the site's geologic, fossil, and prehistoric significance
Malmstrom AFB Museum	Great Falls	Cascade	North central	Aviation	website, history of Malmstrom Air Force Base and air park display of historic military aircraft, models of military aircraft
Marias Museum of History and Art	Shelby	Toole	North central	Local history	website, period rooms, industries, early settlers, toys, fossils
MBMG Mineral Museum	Butte	Silver Bow	Southwest	Geology	website, operated by the Montana Bureau of Mines & Geology, rocks and minerals from Montana, the world and meteorites
McCone County Museum	Circle	McCone	Northeast	Local history	Area local history, over 200 birds and animals mounted and displayed in their natural settings, eight cement dinosaurs, a school house, church and homestead house, depot and caboose
Mehmke Steam Tractor Museum	Great Falls	Cascade	North central	Technology	website, open seasonally, antique steam tractors and agriculture equipment
Milwaukee Depot Museum	Harlowton	Wheatland	North central	Railroad	Open seasonally
Mineral County Museum	Superior	Mineral	Northwest	History	website, logging, mining, Mullan Road
Miracle of America Museum	Polson	Lake	Northwest	History	website, includes pioneer and Native American artifacts, collections of household items including vacuum cleaners, toys, antiques, guns, music items, military artifacts, military vehicles
Missoula Art Museum	Missoula	Missoula	Northwest	Art	Culture of the American West with an emphasis on contemporary Montana artists
MonDak Heritage Center	Sidney	Richland	Northeast	Art	website
Montana Auto Museum	Deer Lodge	Powell	Southwest	Transportation - Automobile	website, located in a former prison, displays over 150 cars and trucks
Montana Cowboy Hall of Fame	Wolf Point	Roosevelt	Northeast	Hall of fame - Cowboys	Proposed museum
Montana Historical Society Museum	Helena	Lewis and Clark	Southwest	Multiple	Also known as Montana's Museum, includes fine art, history, archaeology and ethnological artifacts that pertain to Montana and the region
Montana Law Enforcement Museum	Deer Lodge	Powell	Southwest	Law enforcement	Currently closed web
Montana Military Museum	Helena	Lewis and Clark	Southwest	Military	website, located at Fort William Henry Harrison
Montana Museum of Art & Culture	Missoula	Missoula	Northwest	Art / Culture	At the University of Montana; collection of 10,000 items includes American Impressionism, ceramics, works by Frederic Remington, Julius Seyler, William Merritt Chase, Joseph Henry Sharp, Alfred Maurer, Honoré Daumier, modernist or contemporary artists Andy Warhol, David Salle and R.B. Kitaj
Montana Natural History Center	Missoula	Missoula	Northwest	Natural history	website, flora, fauna and natural history of Western Montana
Moss Mansion	Billings	Yellowstone	Southeast	Historic house	Early 20th century period mansion
Museum of the Beartooths	Columbus	Stillwater	South central	History	website, artifacts, oral histories, replicas
Museum at Central School	Kalispell	Flathead	Northwest	History	History of Northwest Montana, Native American artifacts, sculptures, original paintings, and photography, operated by the Northwest Montana Historical Society,
Museum of Mountain Flying	Missoula	Missoula	Northwest	Aviation	website
Museum of the Plains Indian	Browning	Glacier	Northwest	Ethnic - Native American	website, operated by the Indian Arts and Crafts Board, history, arts and culture of the Northern Plains Tribal peoples including the Blackfeet, Crow, Northern Cheyenne, Sioux, Assiniboine, Arapaho, Shoshone, Nez Perce, Flathead, Chippewa and Cree
Museum of the Rockies	Bozeman	Gallatin	South central	Multiple	Dinosaurs and fossils, natural history, Native American artifacts, area history, living history 1900s house
Musselshell Valley Historical Museum	Roundup	Musselshell	Southeast	Local history	website, open seasonally, exhibits include cowboys and cattle drives, coal mines, one room country schools, a general store, life in the Old West, local art, fossils, guns, early medicine
National Museum of Forest Service History	Missoula	Missoula	Northwest	History	website, proposed museum about the history of the United States Forest Service
Nevada City Museum & Music Hall	Virginia City	Madison	Southwest	History	A seasonal museum that features and preserves 19th century buildings, historic artifact collections, and music machines compiled most initially by Charles and Sue Bovey. Also features living history reenacting during summer weekends. website
New Chicago Schoolhouse	Drummond	Granite	Southwest	Local history	In a restored schoolhouse from 1874
Ninepipes Museum	Charlo	Lake	Northwest	Native American and History	website, history and culture of the Flathead Reservation and early Montana, open seasonally
North American Wildlife Museum	Coram	Flathead	Northwest	Natural history	Collection of taxidermy animals including grizzlies, wolves, elk
O'Fallon Historical Museum	Baker	Fallon	Southeast	Local history	website, history of Southeastern Montana and the Baker Montana area, railroads, homesteading, agriculture, natural gas and oil production
Old Jail Museum	Thompson Falls	Sanders	Northwest	Local history	Operated by the Sanders County Historical Society in a historic jail, open seasonally
Old Prison Museum	Deer Lodge	Powell	Southwest	History	website, former state prison
Old Trail Museum	Choteau	Teton	North central	History / Natural history	website, fossils, dinosaurs, Native American artifacts, grizzly bears, local history, open seasonally
Original Governor's Mansion	Helena	Lewis and Clark	Southwest	Historic house	Late 19th century Queen Anne style mansion
Paris Gibson Square Museum of Art	Great Falls	Cascade	North central	Art	Collection focuses on contemporary art in many media from artists who live in Montana, the western United States and western Canada
Phillips County Museum	Malta	Phillips	Northeast	Local history	website, dinosaurs, Native Americans, cowboys, pioneers and outlaws, open seasonally
Piccadilly Transportation Memorabilia Museum	Butte	Silver Bow	Southwest	Transportation	website, includes highway and subway markers, license plates, vintage cars, advertising art, and assorted automotive memorabilia petroliana from around the world
Pioneer's Pride Museum	Bainville	Roosevelt	Northeast	History	Replica of pioneer house, jail, open summer
Polson-Flathead Historical Museum	Polson	Lake	Northwest	Local history	website, open seasonally, pioneers and homesteaders
Poplar Museum	Poplar	Roosevelt	Northeast	Local history	in old Tribal Jail, frontier and Native American collections
Powder River Historical Museum and Mac's Museum	Broadus	Powder River	Southeast	Local history	Open seasonally
Powell County Museum	Deer Lodge	Powell	Southwest	Local history	website, local history, mining, open in summer
Prairie County Museum & Gallery	Terry	Prairie	Southeast	Local history	Focus is pioneer life, complex includes a homesteader’s house, restored Northern Pacific depot, caboose, steam-heated outhouse, the town’s 1906 “little bank”
Range Riders Museum	Miles City	Custer	Southeast	Local history	website, open seasonally, eastern Montana history including area Native Americans, pioneers of the range country, soldiers including General George Armstrong Custer and General Nelson A. Miles
Ravalli County Museum	Hamilton	Ravalli	Northwest	Multiple	Local history, art exhibits, Native American collection, development of the Rocky Mountain Laboratory, period room displays
Richey Historical Museum	Richey	Dawson	Southwest	Local history	website 6 historic buildings
Rocky Mountain Museum of Military History	Missoula	Missoula	Northwest	Military	website
Rosebud County Pioneer Museum	Forsyth	Rosebud	Southeast	Local history	Open seasonally
Rudyard Museum	Rudyard	Hill	North central	Multiple	website, operated by the Rudyard Historical Society, history in the Depot Museum, paleontology in the Dinosaur Museum, historic automobiles in the Hi-Line Vintage Automobile Museum, open seasonally
Schoolhouse History and Art Center	Colstrip	Rosebud	Southeast	Multiple	website, local history and changing art exhibitions
Seeley Lake Historical Museum	Seeley Lake	Missoula	North central	Local history	website, operated by the Seeley Lake Historical Society in a historic barn
Sheridan County Museum	Plentywood	Sheridan	Northeast	History	Early 20th century items
SpectrUM Discovery Area	Missoula	Missoula	Northwest	Science	Hands-on science activities, operated by the University of Montana
St. Ignatius Mission	St. Ignatius	Lake	Northwest	History	Late 19th-century church located on the Flathead Indian Reservation, historic Mission and Native American artifacts
Thompson-Hickman Museum	Virginia City	Madison	Southwest	History	From the 1860s, guns, geology
Tippet Rise Art Center	Fishtail	Stillwater	South central	Art	Sculpture park/ranch and musical performance venue
Tobacco Valley Historical Village	Eureka	Lincoln	Northwest	Open-air	website; includes a school, church, log cabin, general store, fire tower, and railroad depot from the 1880s to 1920s, all furnished with period artifacts, open seasonally
Treasure County '89ers Museum	Hysham	Treasure	Southeast	Local history	website
Twin Bridges Historical Association Museum	Twin Bridges	Madison	Southwest	History	Native Americans, early pioneers, mining, agriculture
Montana Dinosaur Center	Bynum	Teton	North central	Paleontology	Includes baby dinosaur bones, Guinness Book of World Records largest, scientifically accurate dinosaur reconstruction, Seismosaurus halli, public, hands-on dinosaur research and education programs
University of Montana Western Gallery/ Museum	Dillon	Beaverhead	Southwest	Art	Traveling exhibits, student art, and a permanent art collection
Upper Musselshell Museum	Harlowton	Wheatland	North central	Local history	website, includes fossils, bones, period room displays, historic schoolroom, historic military, medical, railroad and American West artifacts, open seasonally
Upper Swan Valley Historical Society Museum and Heritage Site	Condon	Missoula	Northwest	History	website, open by appointment
Ursuline Center Heritage Museum	Great Falls	Cascade	North central	Religious	History of the Ursuline Sisters, their lives, and how they helped shape the history of Montana, Native American artifacts, antique furnishings, musical instruments
Utica Museum	Utica	Judith Basin	North central	Local history	Artifacts from the Homestead Era, including dishes, clothes, furniture, tools, and leather goods; pictures of local homesteaders
Valley County Pioneer Museum	Glasgow	Valley	Northeast	Local history	website, includes an Assiniboine collection, natural history, railroad and agriculture displays, the creation of the Fort Peck Dam, Lewis and Clark
Victor Heritage Museum	Victor	Ravalli	Northwest	Local history	website, summer only, mining, railroads, people of the area
WaterWorks Art Museum	Miles City	Custer	Southeast	Art	Exhibits of regional and national contemporary art, formerly Custer County Art & Heritage Center
Western Heritage Center	Billings	Yellowstone	Southeast	History	Local history, culture
Whitefish Museum	Whitefish	Flathead	Northwest	History	website, logging, railroad
Wibaux Museum	Wibaux	Wibaux	Southeast	Local history	Early settler life
Winifred Museum	Winifred	Fergus	Northeast	Local history	Includes a collection of over 3000 Tonka toys
Wise Wonders Science & Discovery Museum	Billings	Yellowstone	Southeast	Science	website, interactive exhibits and programming for all ages
Wolf Point Museum	Wolf Point	Roosevelt	Northeast	Local history	website, settlers, Native American culture, heirlooms
World Museum of Mining	Butte	Silver Bow	Southwest	Industry	Mining tools, equipment, photos, re-creation of an 1890s mining town
Wright Zoological Museum	Missoula	Missoula	Northwest	Natural history	Research museum of the University of Montana, not open to the public. 14,500 mammalian, 7,000 avian, and 3,200 fish specimens. The largest collection of its kind in the region.
Yellowstone Art Museum	Billings	Yellowstone	Southeast	Art	Contemporary art
Yellowstone County Museum	Billings	Yellowstone	Southeast	Local history	website, local history, natural history and culture of the Yellowstone Valley of Montana and the Northern Plains
Yellowstone Gateway Museum	Livingston	Park	South central	Local history	website, includes native cultures, early expeditions including the Corps of Discovery and Lewis and Clark, area railroads, transportation, early settlers, a one-room schoolhouse, blacksmith shop, historic transportation vehicles and a caboose
Yellowstone Historic Center	West Yellowstone	Gallatin	South central	Local history	website, located in a historic Union Pacific depot, area transportation, explorers, history of the nation's first national park
Yesterday's Playthings	Deer Lodge	Powell	Southwest	Toy	website, open in summer, dolls, accessories, teddy bears, model trains

== Museums with paleontology holdings ==
This list repeats items in the above list, with more information on fossil dinosaur holdings. Each of the museums on the Montana Dinosaur Trail has "unique paleontology displays, interpretation, replicas or actual skeletons of dinosaurs and other fossils" found in Montana", according to the official Montana Dinosaur Trail web page.

Name	Town/City	County	Region	On Dinosaur Trail?	Education programs/ Guided tours?	Associated Field Digs?	Summary
Blaine County Museum	Chinook	Blaine	North central	Yes	No	No	Website; paleontology department of this local museum has a dozen Judith River Formation exhibits including Hadrosaur, Gorgosaurus, and Ankylosaurus fossils from the area; has remains of gigantic marine reptiles Mosasaur and Plesiosaur, along with invertebrates from the ancient ocean that covered the area; a "Look, Touch, and Wonder" room where visitors can handle fossils of sea creatures, plants, and dinosaurs.
Carter County Museum	Ekalaka	Carter	Southeast	Yes	No	No	Collection, all collected from the nearby Hell Creek Formation, includes one of the world's five skeletons of Anatotitan copei, complete skulls of the three-horned Triceratops horridus, the dome-headed Pachycephalosaurus wyomingensisi, and Nanotyrannus lancesis (a tiny tyrannosaur)
Fort Peck Field Station of Paleontology	Fort Peck	Valley	Northeast	Yes	Yes	No	Website; associated with the University of Montana Paleontology Department, a working field station where paleontologists research, prepare, mold and cast fossils
Fort Peck Interpretive Center	Fort Peck	Valley	Northeast	Yes	Yes	No	Visitor center for the Charles M. Russell National Wildlife Refuge, collection centerpiece is "Peck's Rex", claimed to be one of the most complete Tyrannosaurus rex skeletons yet found; in the lobby is a life-size replica model of Peck's Rex, and the exhibit hall displays a full-size skeleton cast; also a Cretaceous Sea display and several other dinosaur exhibits
Garfield County Museum	Jordan	Garfield	Northeast	Yes	No	Yes	website; open seasonally; dinosaur holdings include Cretaceous fossils from the Hell Creek Formation; a Tyrannosaurus rex skull, full-size Triceratops replica, a Pachycephalosaur skull
Great Plains Dinosaur Museum and Field Station	Malta	Phillips	Northeast	Yes	Yes	Yes	website, contains fossils and preparation lab; displays include Brachylophosaurus mummy dinosaur recognized by the Guinness Book of World Records as the "best preserved" dinosaur; Jurassic Stegosaurs; a Sauropod; visitors can view the lab where dinosaur fossils are prepared
H. Earl Clack Memorial Museum	Havre	Hill	North central	Yes	No	No	Fossil displays include Judith River Formation dinosaur eggs and embryos believed to be laid by a Lambeosaurus ("duck bill" dinosaur); displays about archeological finds from the nearby Wahkpa Chu'gn buffalo jump site.
Makoshika State Park	Glendive	Dawson	Southeast	Yes	Yes	No	Montana's largest state park has dinosaur fossil remains, including Tyrannosaurus rex and Triceratops; visitor center at the park entrance has exhibits explaining the site's geologic, fossil, and prehistoric significance; artifacts include a Triceratops skull; has a "touchy-feely" table allowing visitors to hold fossils and artifacts prevalent in the park
Museum of the Rockies	Bozeman	Gallatin	South central	Yes	Yes	No	Said to have "one of the largest collections of dinosaur fossils in the world", including the world's largest Tyrannosaurus rex skull, one of the first identified female dinosaurs in the world (an ovulating T. rex); rare fossils; part of Montana State University - Bozeman; state's official repository for both federal and state paleontological collections
Old Trail Museum	Choteau	Teton	North central	Yes	No	No	Website; displays finds from the area's Two Medicine Formation, including a Maiasaura skull, Einosaurus skull as well as nestling, hatchling and teenage Maiasaura skeletons and bones, a Sauronitholestes skeleton cast, dinosaur footprints, marine fossils, bones that can be touched, a preparation lab display, geologic information about the Rocky Mountain Front and Willow Creek Anticline
Phillips County Museum	Malta	Phillips	Northeast	Yes	No	No	Website; open seasonally; paleontology section includes fossils from nearby Judith River Formation; 33-foot long skeleton of "Elvis", a Brachylophosaurus, claimed to be "one of the best articulated dinosaur skeletons ever found"; a complete Tyrannosaurus rex skull; 28-foot skeleton of an Albertosaurus
Rudyard Depot Museum	Rudyard	Hill	North central	Yes	No	No	Displays include the "Oldest Sorehead", a Gryposaurus found nearby; a duckbill dinosaur and egg nest display
Montana Dinosaur Center	Bynum	Teton	North central	Yes	Yes	Yes	Baby dinosaur bones; Guinness Book of World Records largest, scientifically accurate dinosaur reconstruction; Seismosaurus halli; public, hands-on dinosaur research and education programs
Upper Musselshell Museum	Harlowton	Wheatland	South central	Yes	No	No	Website; centerpiece is "Ava", a full-size Avaceratops skeleton replica from the Judith River Formation; Hadrosaur tibia and fibula, a cast of a Gypsonictops jaw; dinosaur leg bone and hip bone fossils; other fossilized ancient sea creatures

== Defunct museums ==
- Desert John's Saloon Museum, Deer Lodge
- Makoshika Dinosaur Museum, Glendive
- Museum of Fine Arts Butte

== Regions ==
The six regions referred to in the above lists are based on those used by the Montana tourism authority and the Montana Association of Museums. The regions used here have the same boundaries but are renamed here:

- North central ("Russell Country"):
  - Prominent communities: Great Falls
  - Counties: Cascade, Chouteau, Hill, Judith Basin, Liberty County, Meagher, Pondera, Toole, Wheatland
- Northeast ("Missouri River Country"):
  - Counties: Blaine, Daniels, Fergus, Garfield, McCone, Petroleum, Phillips, Richland, Roosevelt, Sheridan, Valley
- Northwest ("Glacier Country"):
  - Prominent communities: Missoula, Whitefish
- Counties: Flathead, Glacier, Lake, Lincoln, Mineral, Missoula, Ravalli
- South central ("Yellowstone Country"):
  - Prominent communities: Bozeman
  - Counties: Carbon, Gallatin, Stillwater, Sweet Grass, Park
- Southeast ("Custer Country"):
  - Prominent communities: Billings
  - Counties: Big Horn, Carter, Custer, Dawson, Fallon, Golden, Musselshell, Prairie, Powder River, Rosebud, Treasure, Wibaux, Yellowstone
- Southwest ("Gold West Country"):
  - Prominent communities: Helena, Butte
  - Counties: Beaverhead, Broadwater, Deer Lodge, Granite, Jefferson, Lewis and Clark, Madison, Powell, Silver Bow

== See also ==
- Nature Centers in Montana
