= KXGN =

KXGN may refer to:

- KXGN-TV, a television station (channel 5) licensed to Glendive, Montana, United States
- KXGN (AM), a radio station (1400 AM) licensed to Glendive, Montana, United States
