= Glendive Dinosaur and Fossil Museum =

Creationist museum in Glendive, Montana, U.S.

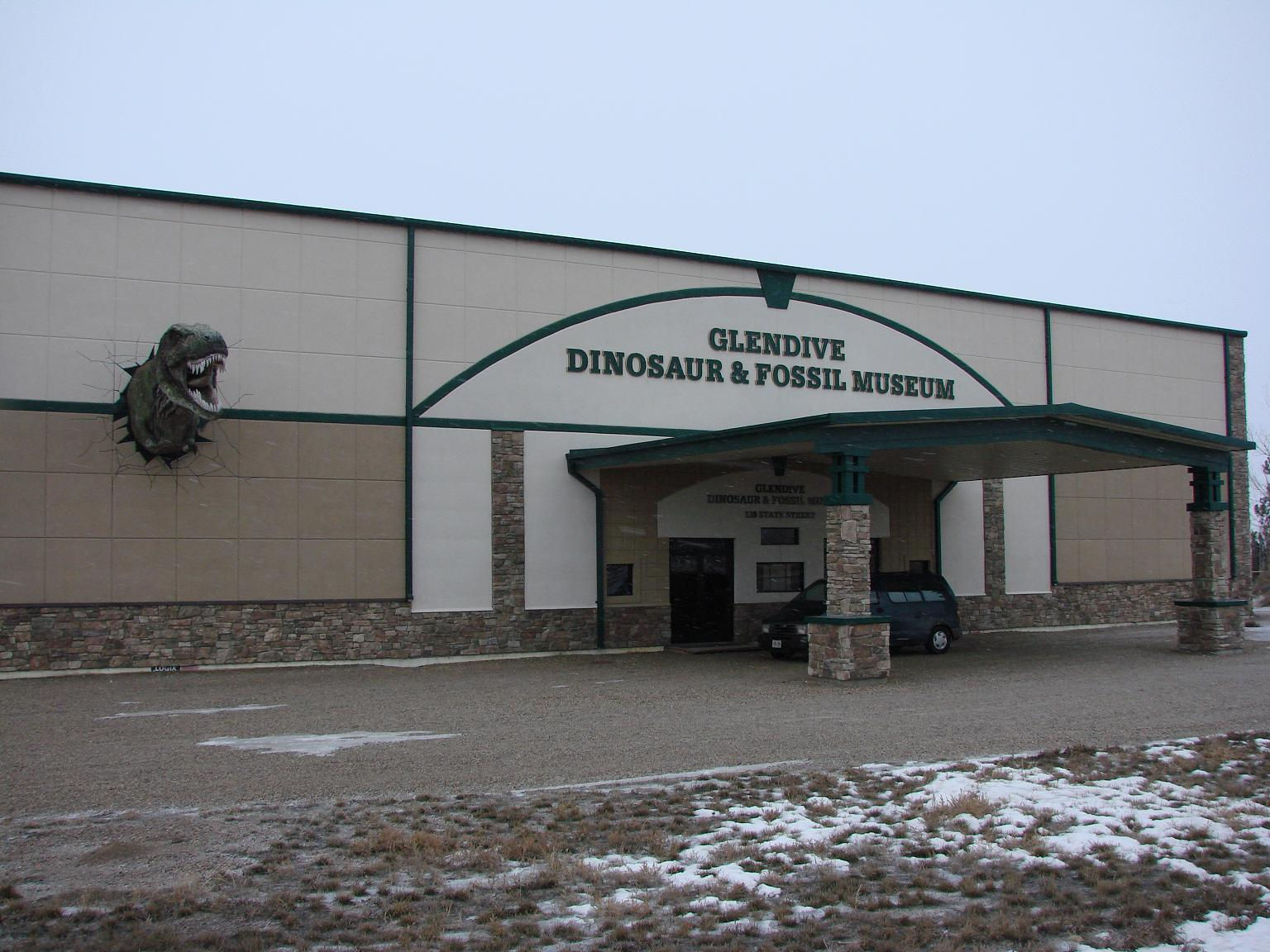
- Established: 2009
- Location: Glendive, Montana, United States
- Coordinates: 47°7′30″N 104°41′28″W
- Founder: Otis Kline
- Owner: Advancing Creation Truth
- Website: creationtruth.org

The Glendive Dinosaur and Fossil Museum is a private dinosaur museum in Glendive, Montana, in the United States. The museum was founded by Otis Kline, and is owned by the non-profit organization Advancing Creation Truth. It promotes a Young Earth creationist (YEC) explanation of evolution based on a literal interpretation of the Genesis creation narrative in the Bible. This creationist museum promotes the belief that non-avian dinosaurs and humans lived at the same time, including a belief that dinosaurs were on Noah's Ark. Built between 2005 and 2009, mostly with volunteer labor, the structure is valued at about $4 million, not counting the value of the exhibits.

== Description and history ==
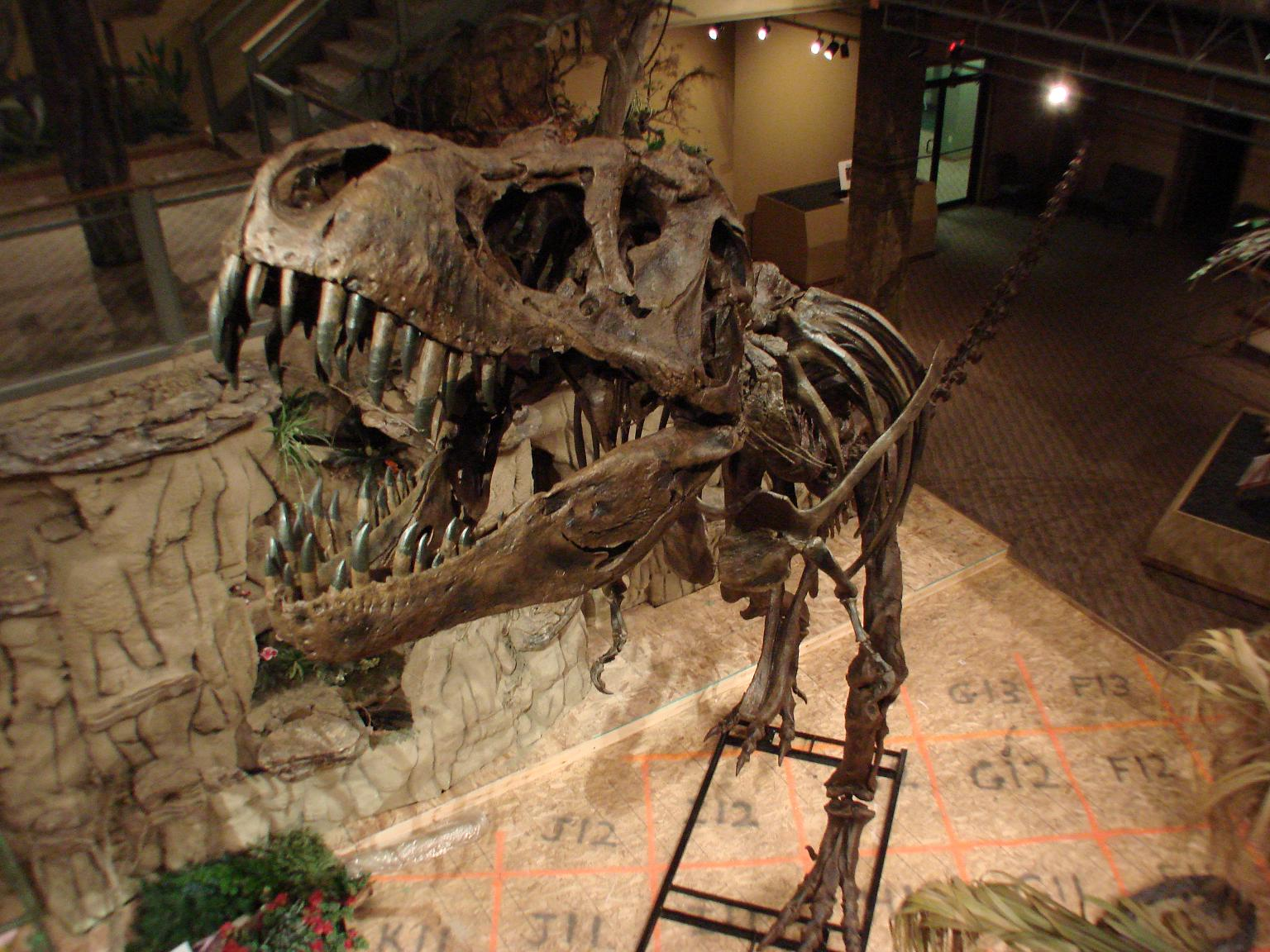
T. rex specimen on display at the museum

The facility bills itself as the second-largest "dinosaur museum" in Montana, and the only museum in the state with a creationist perspective. It has drawn criticism from the paleontology community since its opening in 2009. Scientists noted that Montana is a well-known hotbed of fossil discovery, and expressed concern that Glendive is the "opposite of a science museum." Two examples paleontologists used to explain their position were the discovery of soft tissue remnants in fossils, used by creationists to boost their argument for recent creation in spite of radiometric dating to the contrary; and the origins of the Hell Creek Formation, a location not far from Glendive, formed by ancient rivers and their floodplains on the coast of an inland seaway, an area which has been subject to extensive fieldwork but has shown no evidence of catastrophic flooding in its formation. Museum of the Rockies paleontologist Jack Horner, told the Billings Gazette, "It's not a science museum at all...it's not a pseudo-science museum…There's nothing scientific about it."

The museum was subject to further controversy in 2015 when it was discovered that local public schools had been bringing students there for field trips. Although the students were taken only through the dinosaur exhibits and not given religious instruction, Americans United for Separation of Church and State sent a letter to the school district, pointing out that "school functions tied to organizations dedicated to religious causes violate the Establishment Clause." When interviewed by the Billings Gazette, Kline admitted that if a student were to ask about the age of a fossil, he would convey his views.

The Gianforte Family Foundation, started by tech businessman and now Governor of Montana Greg Gianforte, donated a replica of a Tyrannosaurus rex skeleton and the funding for an Acrocanthosaurus exhibit. By some accounts, Gianforte was the largest single donor to the project. Records indicate that the Gianforte foundation has donated approximately $290,000 to Advancing Creation Truth.

The Glendive area occasionally hosts dinosaur exhibits consistent with scientific consensus at Makoshika State Park and the Frontier Gateway Museum. The latter is the official Dawson County museum, but is only open between Memorial Day and Labor Day.

== See also ==
- List of museums in Montana
