= KDZN =

- Glendive, Montana; United States
- Broadcast area: East Central Montana
- Frequency: 96.5 MHz
- Branding: Z-96

Programming
- Format: Country
- Affiliations: CBS News Radio; Westwood One

Ownership
- Owner: Andrew Sturlaugson; (P&A Media LLC)
- Sister stations: KXGN

History
- First air date: December 21, 1969
- Former call signs: KIVE (1969–1985); KGLE-FM (1985–1986)

Technical information
- Licensing authority: FCC
- Facility ID: 39610
- Class: C1
- Power: 100,000 watts
- HAAT: 151 meters (495 ft)
- Transmitter coordinates: 47°5′1″N 104°48′6.9″W

Links
- Public license information: Public file; LMS
- Webcast: Listen live
- Website: web.kxgn.com/kdzn-radio/

KDZN (96.5 FM) is a country formatted broadcast radio station licensed to Glendive, Montana, serving East Central Montana. KDZN is owned and operated by Andrew Sturlaugson's P&A Media.

== History ==
Logo from the station's group website.

KDZN signed on in 1969 as KIVE. In 1985, the station became KGLE-FM; at the time, it was owned by crosstown Friends of Christian Radio, Inc, who also formerly owned KGLE AM 590. In 1986, Magic Air Communications bought KGLE-FM, switching the calls to KDZN and the format to country, where it remains today. Stephen Marks, through Glendive Broadcasting Corporation, bought Magic Air in 1995, making KDZN a sister station to KXGN AM-TV, which Marks had purchased in 1990.

Stephen Marks died on May 11, 2022. Andrew Sturlaugson's P&A Media acquired Marks' Montana and North Dakota radio stations, including KDZN and KXGN, for $850,000 in 2024; Sturlaugson had been the Glendive stations' operations manager. The sale separated the radio stations from KXGN-TV, which the Marks estate retained until 2025.

== Programming ==
Programming on KDZN is provided via the Westwood One satellite network during the mid-morning, mid-afternoon and evening hours. News on KDZN comes from CBS News Radio.
