= Diana Thomas (mathematician) =

American mathematician

Diana Maria Thomas is an American applied mathematician known for her research on nutrition and body weight. She is a professor of mathematics at the United States Military Academy (West Point).

== Education and career ==
Thomas is originally from Glendive, Montana, where her father was a physician; she is a graduate of Dawson County High School in Glendive, and majored in mathematics at the University of Montana, graduating in 1991. She earned a Ph.D. in mathematics in 1996 from the Georgia Institute of Technology. Her dissertation, Dynamics of Lattice Systems, was supervised by Shui-Nee Chow.

After postdoctoral research at West Point and the Army Research Laboratory, she joined the faculty at New Jersey City University in 1998, and moved to Montclair State University in 2000. In 2017, she returned to West Point as a professor.

== Research ==
Topics in Thomas's research have included a comparison of the effects of dieting and exercise on weight loss, the effects of weight loss on pregnancy, epidemiological approaches to obesity, the use of biometric data to predict military training injuries, and a statistical comparison of the body types of military recruits with Leonardo da Vinci's Vitruvian Man.

== Recognition ==
In 2012 the New Jersey Section of the Mathematical Association of America (MAA) gave Thomas their Award for Distinguished College or University Teaching of Mathematics. The award recognized her "dedication to teaching, her untiring devotion and concern for students, her work with students outside the classroom, her commitment to undergraduate research, and her classroom experimentation based on learning and human motivational literature". It noted in particular the many undergraduate research projects she supervised, two of which led to best poster awards at MAA conferences, as well as her work to double the size of the poster sessions at the Joint Mathematics Meetings. She was awarded the 2023 AMS Dolciani Prize for Excellence in Research "for her outstanding research at the interface of mathematics with nutrition and obesity; her work in number theory, combinatorics, and dynamical systems; and her impressive work with undergraduates."
