= KXGN (AM) =

Coordinates: 47°5′40″N 104°42′51.9″W

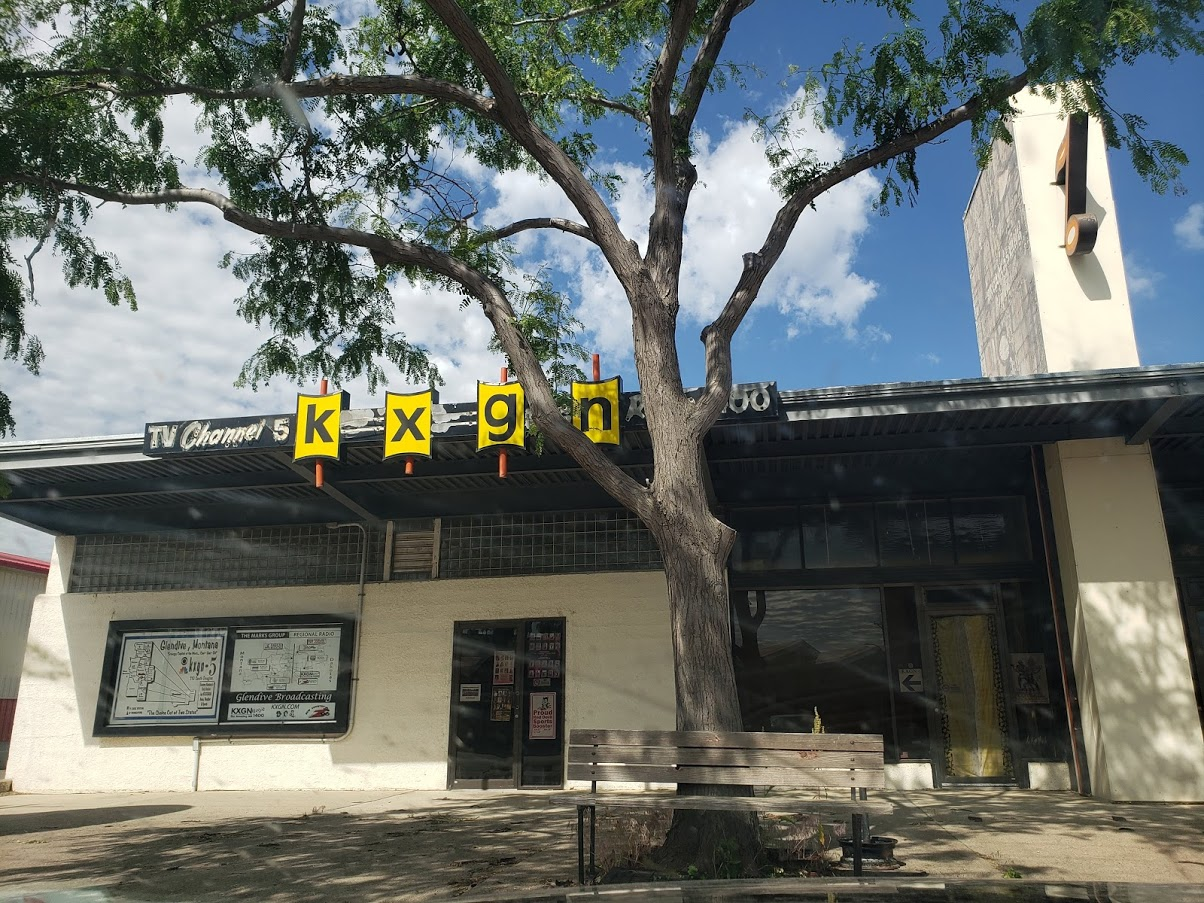
- The studios of KXGN TV and radio on South Douglas Street in Glendive, Montana.
- Glendive, Montana; United States
- Frequency: 1400 kHz
- Branding: KXGN 1400 AM & 103.1 FM

Programming
- Format: Oldies; adult contemporary; news
- Affiliations: Fox News Radio

Ownership
- Owner: Andrew Sturlaugson; (P&A Media LLC)
- Sister stations: KDZN

History
- First air date: September 23, 1948

Technical information
- Licensing authority: FCC
- Facility ID: 24285
- Class: C
- Power: 1,000 watts unlimited
- Translator: 103.1 K276GO (Glendive)

Links
- Public license information: Public file; LMS
- Webcast: Listen live
- Website: web.kxgn.com/kxgn-1400-am/

KXGN (1400 kHz) is an AM radio station in Glendive, Montana, United States. The station is owned by Andrew Sturlaugson's P&A Media, along with KDZN. KXGN signed on in 1948.

== History ==
Former logo

Lewis Wiles Moore was granted a construction permit for a new station on 1400 kHz in Glendive in July 1948; the station, which took the call sign KXGN, went on the air September 23. In 1954, the license was transferred to the Glendive Broadcasting Corporation; Moore retained 99 percent of the new company, with Mary L. Moore and Elizabeth Kinsfater each holding a 0.05-percent interest. A television sister station, KXGN-TV (channel 5), was added in 1957.

Stephen A. Marks, owner of WBKB-TV in Alpena, Michigan, bought KXGN and KXGN-TV from Lewis Moore in 1989. The sale required a waiver of Federal Communications Commission (FCC) regulations that prohibited common ownership of radio and television stations, which was granted in May 1990; by then, Moore had retired to Palm Desert, California. Marks added an FM station, KDZN, to the group in 1995; by this point, KXGN radio was losing money and was being supported by revenues from KXGN-TV.

Stephen Marks died on May 11, 2022. Andrew Sturlaugson's P&A Media acquired Marks' Montana and North Dakota radio stations, including KXGN and KDZN, for $850,000 in 2024; Sturlaugson had been the Glendive stations' operations manager. The sale separated the radio stations from KXGN-TV, which the Marks estate retained until 2025.

== Programming ==
KXGN broadcasts a mix of oldies and adult contemporary music with local news from KXGN and national news from Fox News Radio. Ranch, farm and other agriculture-oriented news is also offered on KXGN, as Glendive is a large farming community.

High school sports including Dawson County High School football, boys and girls basketball, volleyball and softball are heard on KXGN. The station also airs local American Legion, Babe Ruth and Little League baseball games in the summer. KXGN also airs games featuring the teams from Dawson Community College in Glendive and football and basketball games from the University of Montana in Missoula.
