= Herbert Aldinger =

American author (born 1943)

- Born: September 17, 1943 (age 82); Turin, Poland
- Other names: Herb Allenger, H. Allenger
- Education: Park County High School, North Central High School (1962), Eastern Washington State College (1966), University of Arkansas (1972)
- Occupations: Author, Military
- Years active: 1966-present
- Notable work: Polyxena, Ahuitzotl

Herbert Aldinger (born September 17, 1943; pen name H. Allenger) is an American author, and former military officer, known for his novels Polyxena and Ahuitzotl.

== Early life and education ==
Herbert Aldinger was born in Turin, Poland, of a German father and Austrian mother. The family immigrated to the U.S. in 1951. He spent his early childhood in Glendive, Montana. He left his school halfway through his 8th grade and moved to Livington. He then attended Park County High School but had to move to Spokane, Washington and enrolled at North Central High School where he graduated in 1962.

He received his higher education from Eastern Washington State College, graduating with BA in political science in 1966. Both in 1962 and 1966, he had a draft board looming over him, so he decided to voluntarily join the college's ROTC program.

== Career ==
=== Military ===
Aldinger entered the US ARMY in 1966 and was assigned to the Transportation Corps Officer Training School at Fort Eustis, Virginia for three months where he got his first tour of duty assignment to Okinawa from 1966 to 1968. From there he spent a year in Vietnam (from October 1968 to October 1969), first as Operations Officer for the 57th Transportation Battalion in Quang Tri, and then as commander of Task Force 57–2 in Duc Pho (LZ Bronco), a forward logistical activity in direct support of the 11th Infantry Brigade. He extended his military service and requested an inter-theatre transfer to Germany, mainly to make contact with relatives he had there, which eventually did, but by way of Fort Bliss, Texas. He was then assigned as the Battalion Motor Officer for the 2nd Battalion, 60th Air Defense Artillery, a newly activated unit that was implemented to provide defense against low-flying enemy aircraft for primary military installations. The new weapons were the Chaparral missile/Vulcan gun systems. After nine months at Fort Bliss, the battalion was moved to Germany where, by a stroke of good fortune, the unit was headquartered at Ramstein Air Base in the Rhineland. It was considered good fortune because the Air Force had the best facilities in Germany and Allenger s best friends were also Air Force Officers. Allenger received a master's degree in International Relations in 1972 from the University of Arkansas which offered an overseas extension course in that field by attending night school while at Ramstein.

From June 1970 to October 1973, Aldinger was posted in Germany and visited many places in Europe in his times off duty, which gave him the traveling bug that lead to his present day career. He joined the Ramstein Ski Club and skied in some of the most notable places in Europe. His military service ended after seven years in 1973 when the US ARMY reduced its Reserve Officer corps after the Vietnam War neared its close. Aldinger received a Bronze Star for this service in Vietnam and then an Army Commendation Medal for his service in Germany.

=== Civilian life ===
After floundering for over a year, he got a job as Transportation Coordinator for the Seattle School District in February, 1975, and remained at that job for the next 31 years. He headed the Transportation Office's budget and fuel accounts and became sort of a jack-of-all-trades within the department, but primarily he managed the Secondary School Transportation program (Middle/High Schools) guiding it through the District's desegregation years. The office transitioned from a manual operation to a highly computerized system in the time Aldinger was there, keeping him mentally stimulated and energized so that the job rarely was boring. He retired from the District in 2006.

=== Author ===
H. Allenger had a life-long interest in Native-American civilizations and began satisfying this curiosity in the years that he worked for the School District by taking trips to Mexico and Central America with his frequent traveling partner, Judy Zier. He had a wide range of interests that included history, Greek and Norse mythology, and traveling. In 1990, he went on a trip titled ‘The Capitals of Anatolia’ where, among other places, he saw the ruins of Hissarlik, or Troy, in Turkey with no inkling at the time that he would eventually write a novel about it. Instead he began to write his Aztec novel ‘Ahuitzotl’, after one of his frequent trips to Mexico. He had it written out on a typewriter when the District began its desegregation busing program in 1980. Managing this program became very labor-intensive and demanded a lot of overtime work so the novel languished in the closet for over twenty years. It was after he retired in 2006 that, not knowing what to do with himself, he proceeded on the novel ’Polyxena’. The inspiration for the book came from watching Wolfgang Petersen's movie ‘Troy’. He was actually in Mycenae, Greece, in 2004, on a trip with Archaeological Tours when ‘Troy’ made its debut in Europe. He was attracted to the name Polyxena that made him want to write a story about her.

Writing ‘Polyxena’ greatly helped Allenger ease into retirement. He remained gung-ho on it throughout, waking up in the mornings eagerly wanting to get to it, and never suffered any writer's block while doing it, completing it in six months. Then he ran into difficulties trying to find a publisher for it, and after three years, he decided to go the self-publishing route. After that, he scanned the type-written pages of his Aztec novel into a computer and proceeded to finalize it, so in a curious twist of fate, his first novel wound up being his second published novel. Oddly enough, he began it for the same reason he wrote ‘Polyxena’; he was attracted to the name Pelaxilla (one of the principle characters of ‘Ahuitzotl’).

In addition to the novels, ‘Polyxena’ and ‘Ahuitzotl’, he wanted to try his luck at a non-fiction work and completed ‘The Pleasures of Green Lake’, a photographic journal of his daily walks around Seattle's Green Lake covering an eighteen-month period. Allenger presently has two other works in progress: ‘Assortments’, a collection of short stories on strange dreams he has had, and ‘The Mayas: A Private Passion’, a personalized view of his visits to several Mayan archaeological sites.

== Books ==
- Polyxena: A Story Of Troy.
- Ahuitzotl.
- The Pleasures of Green Lake
- Assortments
- The Mayas: A Private Passion
