= KXGN-TV =

Television station in Glendive, Montana

- Glendive, Montana; United States
- Channels: Digital: 5 (VHF); Virtual: 5

Programming
- Network: Montana PBS
- Affiliations: 5.1: PBS; for others, see Montana PBS § Subchannels

Ownership
- Owner: Montana State University

History
- First air date: November 1, 1957
- Former channel numbers: Analog: 5 (VHF, 1957–2009)
- Former affiliations: Independent (1957–1962); CBS (1962–2025); ABC (until the late 1960s); NBC (secondary, 1962–2009; 5.2, 2009–2024); Fox (secondary, 1990s)

Technical information
- Licensing authority: FCC
- Facility ID: 24287
- ERP: 1 kW
- HAAT: 152.4 m (500 ft)
- Transmitter coordinates: 47°2′39″N 104°40′54.4″W
- Translator(s): see § Translators

Links
- Public license information: Public file; LMS
- Website: www.montanapbs.org

KXGN-TV (channel 5) is a PBS member television station in Glendive, Montana, United States. Owned by Montana State University (MSU), it is operated as part of the Montana PBS state network, a joint venture with the University of Montana (UM). KXGN-TV broadcasts from a transmitter site in Makoshika State Park; master control and internal operations are based at the network's headquarters in the Visual Communications Building on the MSU campus in Bozeman.

KXGN-TV is the only television station in Glendive, formerly reckoned as the smallest television market in the United States: in 2021, Nielsen Media Research ranked it last of the 210 designated market areas for television in the country with 3,900 households. From its 1957 launch until 2025, KXGN-TV was a commercial television station co-owned with KXGN (1400 AM) and KDZN (96.5 FM). Initially an independent, KXGN-TV became a primary CBS affiliate in 1962 and aired news and other programs from KTVQ in Billings and the Montana Television Network. By 2024, its lone local program was a public affairs presentation covering issues in eastern Montana, though previously it produced limited local newscasts. Its status as the smallest station in the United States earned it notoriety in the broadcasting industry; over its history, publications including the Los Angeles Times and Sports Illustrated profiled KXGN-TV.

The Marks Group purchased KXGN radio and TV in 1989 from the founding Moore family, and in the 2009 digital television conversion, added NBC on a subchannel. Following the 2022 death of president Stephen Marks, The Marks Group was broken up. KXGN radio and other Marks radio properties in Montana and North Dakota were sold separately from KXGN-TV in 2024, and at the end of that year, local programming and the NBC subchannel were discontinued. KXGN-TV and KYUS-TV in Miles City, the last broadcast properties owned by the Marks estate, were sold to MSU in 2025.

== History ==
=== Moore ownership (1957–1989) ===
KXGN-TV was founded by Lewis W. Moore, who had moved from Havre to Glendive in 1945 and owned the Rose Theater. In 1948, he started KXGN radio as a hedge against the possible decline of the movie theater business and to reach rural consumers with advertisements for his picture house in Glendive. Because of the radio station, Moore was well positioned to start a television station. On December 21, 1956, his Glendive Broadcasting Corporation filed with the Federal Communications Commission (FCC) to build a new TV station on channel 5 in Glendive, having previously asked for the channel to be authorized in addition to UHF channel 18. The FCC approved on March 13, 1957, and KXGN-TV began broadcasting on November 1.

We'd go to New York to see the networks, and they'd ask us where we were from. It was bad enough that we should tell them Montana, but when we added Glendive, well, they'd never heard of it.

— Lewis W. Moore, founder of KXGN radio and television, in a 1965 interview

From the beginning, it was clear that KXGN-TV would be a small station. In a 1959 United States Senate hearing in Helena which focused on the issue of cable television putting some small stations in the Mountain West out of business, Moore noted that KXGN's population served was the smallest "of any TV station in America, perhaps in the world". It initially had no network affiliation at all, struggling to produce five hours of live and filmed programming a day with a staff of nine. In 1962, salvation came when a receiving facility and microwave hookup were built east of Glendive at Wibaux to receive and send on programs from CBS affiliate KDIX-TV in Dickinson, North Dakota. The hookup allowed Moore to raise enough money to relocate the station to new studio facilities in a former implement dealership and build a higher tower site in 1963.

Moore was also able to get ahead of the cable problem by purchasing a 50 percent stake in the cable system built to serve Glendive with television in 1968, and even after local viewers could subscribe to a choice in programming, KXGN remained popular because of its extensive community service orientation and unduplicated coverage of eastern Montana. By that time, ABC programs were off the schedule; the station had settled into its pattern for the next 40 years of being a primary CBS affiliate with selected NBC programs. CBS would later grant the station permission to air CBS programming from 6 to 9 p.m. to improve ratings; this also allowed it to air NBC or other programming in the 9 p.m. hour and NBC Nightly News and the CBS Evening News back-to-back. Local programming included live bingo five days a week during the winter months and local news specials as needed.

=== Stephen Marks ownership (1989–2025) ===
In 1988, Moore put KXGN radio and television on the market in order to complete his retirement. The move came at a tough time for the stations and the market they served. The Burlington Northern railroad had stopped operating through Glendive years prior; low oil prices depressed the region's energy sector; the worst drought since the 1930s negatively impacted the livestock and feed industries; and after Black Monday in 1987, national spot advertising sales dropped precipitously. To cut costs, KXGN dropped the Associated Press newswire, laid off staff, and canceled its public affairs show, the weekly Let's Talk About It. General manager "Dapper Dan" Frenzel, who had worked at the station since 1964, attempted to build a coalition of local buyers to take over the station, but they could not meet Moore's $1 million asking price. Instead, a Michigan man with a penchant for small-town TV struck a deal to purchase the KXGN stations in 1989. Stephen Marks owned WBKB-TV in Alpena, Michigan, also a single-station market, and said he liked one-station areas because they could command all of the available TV revenue in the area.

The sale took longer than Moore had expected because the FCC at the time had a rule that normally barred cross-ownership of radio and television stations. It was not until May 1990 that the FCC granted a waiver, noting the economic conditions inherent in the small-market stations, their extensively integrated operation, and the fact they had been co-owned for the television station's entire history. The commission also cited the availability of other electronic media through two Glendive-licensed radio stations, six other signals, and the cable system (which Moore sold off in 1986), as well as a daily newspaper. Marks added KDZN in 1995; the FCC approved the purchase of the FM station because of the substantial losses that KXGN AM, then supported entirely by the TV station, and KDZN had incurred in the region's continuing poor economy.

Beginning in 1990, KXGN-TV was a formal member of the Montana Television Network (MTN), airing the noon and evening newscasts of KTVQ in Billings and contributing Eastern Montana news to MTN. KXGN also aired some Fox programming, primarily the NFL on Fox, when Fox gained football rights from CBS in 1994.

Frenzel died of a heart condition in 2003 and was replaced by Paul Sturlaugson as general manager.

=== Digital television transition ===
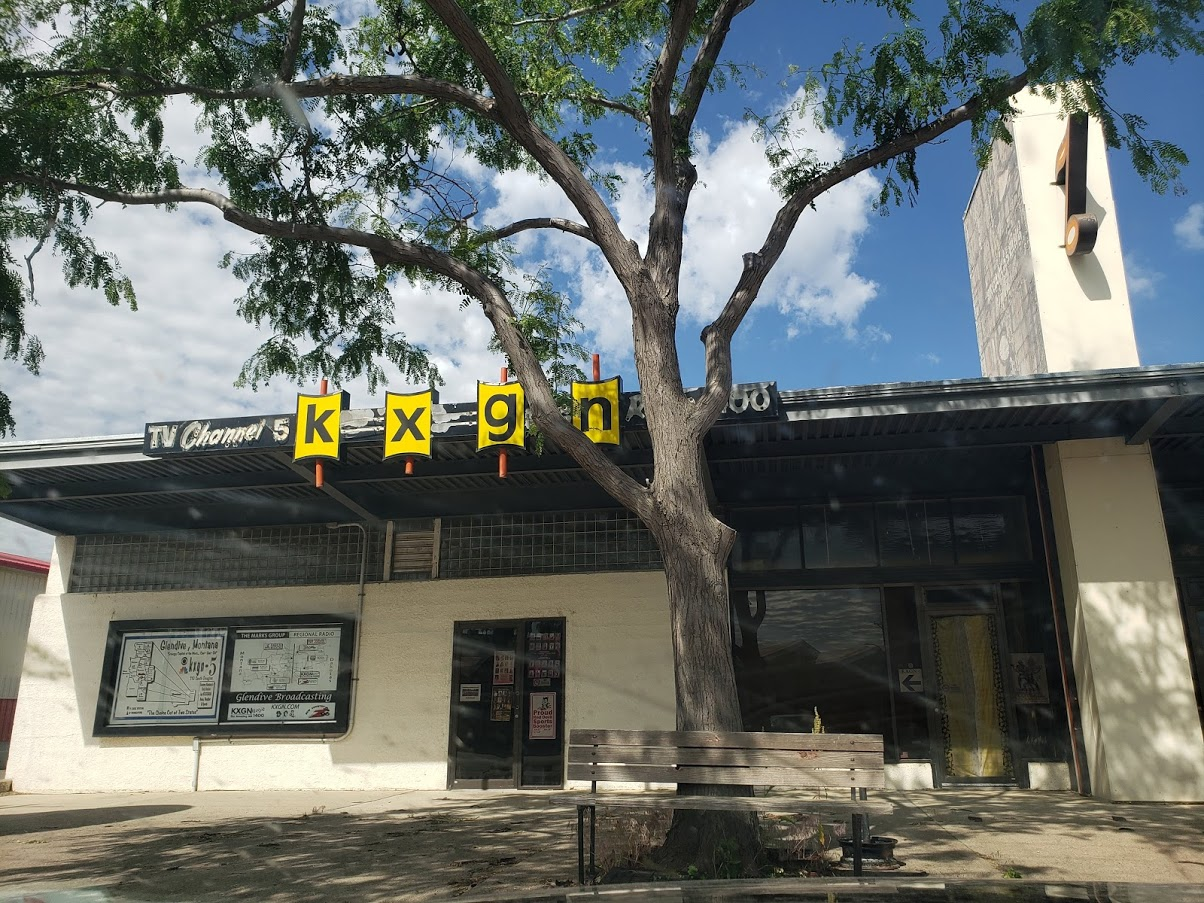
The former studios of KXGN-TV on South Douglas Street in Glendive, Montana

Sturlaugson's most pressing challenge in the 2000s was leading the station through its costly upgrade to digital television. If not for the DTV Delay Act pushing the final cutoff date back by four months from February to June 2009, KXGN-TV would not have converted in a timely manner, as the equipment had not arrived by February. While many stations had a May 1, 2002, deadline to start a digital signal, KXGN-TV requested and received multiple extensions due to financial hardship. In 2008, the FCC had permitted it to convert to digital on VHF channel 5 instead of the originally allocated channel 10, a process that saved money but delayed installation of the facility. After the successful digital conversion, in September 2009, KXGN added a dedicated NBC subchannel, an idea Sturlaugson had discussed prior to the transition; Marks had previously signed KXGN up to carry the never-launched .2 Network in 2008. NBC programs were aired in pattern for the Mountain Time Zone; regional newscasts from KULR-TV in Billings, with the exception of the first hour of its morning newscast, Wake Up Montana, were also shown live. The station's various translators were converted to digital service by their operators in the years that followed; for instance, the retransmitters at Plevna were converted at the end of 2011, also expanding the reach of the NBC subchannel.

KXGN-TV's CBS subchannel (5.1) cleared the entire CBS schedule. Some CBS programs—particularly CBS Mornings, The Price Is Right, and Let's Make a Deal—aired one hour ahead of their usual Mountain Time Zone airings. The CBS Evening News was aired at 5 p.m. instead of 5:30 p.m. to accommodate the KTVQ 5:30 p.m. newscast. Even after dropping NBC from its primary subchannel, KXGN retained the 6 to 9 p.m. CBS prime time block intact, opting to show syndicated programming at 9 p.m.

=== Sale to Montana PBS ===
Marks died on May 11, 2022; his company The Marks Group had 14 radio stations and five TV stations (including KXGN-TV) at the time of his death. In early 2024, Marks sold its Montana and North Dakota radio stations, including KXGN and KDZN, to operations manager Andrew Sturlaugson's P&A Media, while retaining KXGN-TV and KYUS-TV in Miles City. That December, KXGN-TV announced that it would drop NBC at 11:59 p.m. on December 31, ahead of other changes at the station that included the planned sale of its Douglas Street studios. The decision to discontinue NBC programming, made for profitability reasons, coincided with the end of local studio production. In March 2025, the station began preparing to vacate the building; staff readied a garage sale of props, unused equipment, and other broadcasting ephemera.

On July 8, 2025, the Marks Group filed to sell KXGN-TV and KYUS-TV to Montana State University—owner of Montana PBS, the state's public television broadcaster—for $375,000; the remainder of the stations' value was credited as a donation. The sale was consummated on October 22, with both stations, along with KXGN's Sidney–Fairview translator K13IG-D, joining the Montana PBS network. (Note: Due to the federal government shutdown, the consummation paperwork was filed on November 24, 2025.) KXGN-TV and KYUS-TV, which were the Marks Group's final broadcast properties, brought over-the-air public television service to far eastern Montana for the first time; except for translators in the northeastern and southeastern parts of the state, Montana PBS did not previously own transmitters east of Billings. The former Douglas Street studios were converted into a thrift store operated by Living Independently for Today & Tomorrow, a regional Center for Independent Living.

== Local newscasts ==
KXGN aired a daily evening local newscast under various titles, including Action 5 News and Montana East News, until 2015. (The title Action 5 News was used in the 1980s when Terry Kegley anchored the newscast; he also chose the name.) The newsgathering and production was often a one-person operation in which the anchor conducted interviews for the newscast and then produced the program with one studio camera. By 1988, Action 5 News was only eight minutes long, with the other 22 minutes filled in with MTN news from Billings. Montana East News debuted in November 1991 and aired at 9:30 p.m. weeknights as a lead-in to the KTVQ-MTN late news. Former longtime personality Ed Agre (1937–2015), who joined KXGN in 1993, was once profiled by Sports Illustrated for his duties in this capacity, including traveling to produce high school sports shows.

In the later years of the newscast's operation, Emilie Boyles served as the station's sole reporter and editor. By that time, the five-minute newscast aired at 9:55 p.m. and 7:25 a.m. the following day on KXGN's CBS subchannel, and 4:55 p.m. on KXGN's NBC subchannel. The local newscast was cancelled in 2015; afterward, the only local production on KXGN was Let's Talk About It, a half-hour public affairs program that aired on Sundays on both of KXGN's subchannels. As of 2022, it also aired on KXGN and KDZN radio as well as Marks-owned KGCX in Sidney. Studio programming was discontinued in late 2024.

== Technical information ==
KXGN-TV's transmitter is located at Makoshika State Park.

=== Translators ===
Like many other Montana stations, KXGN relies heavily on a mix of broadcast translators and cable TV systems to extend its reach to more viewers, many of them outside of the Glendive area, from Ekalaka in the south to Scobey and Plentywood in the north.

- Baker: K27LT-D
- Circle: K16GP-D
- Culbertson: K34GY-D
- Ekalaka: K13LN-D
- Plentywood: K28OB-D
- Plevna: K03HD-D
- Poplar: K05KK-D, K17MS-D (Note: These stations are not co-sited. K17MS-D is a stacked translator with KUSM 9.1, ABC, Fox and SWX from KFBB-TV in Great Falls, NBC from KUMV-TV in Williston, North Dakota, and CBS from KRTV in Great Falls. It is the program source for the Scobey, Plentywood, and Circle translators.)
- Scobey: K13MA-D
- Sidney–Fairview: K13IG-D
