= Dawson Community College =

Community college in Glendive, Montana, U.S.

Coordinates: 47.085056°N 104.724850°W

- Motto: Learn Today. Lead Tomorrow
- Type: Public community college
- Established: 1940; 86 years ago
- Parent institution: Montana University System
- Academic affiliations: Space-grant
- President: Chad C. Knudson
- Faculty: 25 full-time, 20 part-time/adjunct
- Location: Glendive, Montana, U.S.
- Campus: Rural, 350 acres (140 ha)
- Colors: Red and black
- Nickname: Bucs
- Sporting affiliations: Mon-Dak Conference, NJCAA, NIRA
- Mascot: Buccaneers
- Website: www.dawson.edu

Dawson Community College (DCC) is a public community college in Glendive, Montana. The college enrolls approximately 400 students and offers associate degree programs and certificate programs. It is accredited by the Northwest Commission on Colleges and Universities and is part of the Montana University System.

== Academics ==
Dawson offers the Associate of Arts (AA), Associate of Science (AS), and Associate of Applied Science (AAS) degree programs. It also offers vocational certificate programs. The college has an open admissions policy.

== Campus housing ==
The student housing complex is made up of thirty-six, two bedroom apartments which house up to six students. Each fully furnished unit includes two bedrooms, a full kitchen, a dining area, a living room, and a full bathroom. The room and board cost includes a student's rent, utilities, cable television, local telephone, high speed internet access, and participation in the 10 meal or 16 meal per week food plan. Students living on campus have easy and quick access to all the campus buildings, offices, and activities.

Full-time students under the age of 21 must live on campus until they have earned 30 credits. All students living on campus must participate in the food plan. Students can reserve a space for housing at the same time an admissions application is submitted.

== Athletics ==
The DCC Buccaneers varsity athletic programs provide intercollegiate competition. Dawson Community College athletics compete in the National Junior College Athletic Association (NJCAA), the National Intercollegiate Rodeo Association (NIRA), and in the Mon-Dak conference.

Men's athletic programs:

- Baseball
- Basketball
- Rodeo
- Cross-country
- Track and field

Women's athletic programs

- Basketball
- Fast-pitch softball
- Rodeo
- Volleyball
- Cross-country
- Track and field

Dawson Community College Athletics rivals are the Miles Community College (MCC) Pioneers.

== Notable people ==
=== Alumni ===
- Jeff Delzer (R), North Dakota House of Representatives, 8th District

== See also ==
- Glendive, Montana
- Dawson County, Montana
