= First Episcopal Methodist Church of Chester =

Historic church in Montana, United States

- U.S. National Register of Historic Places
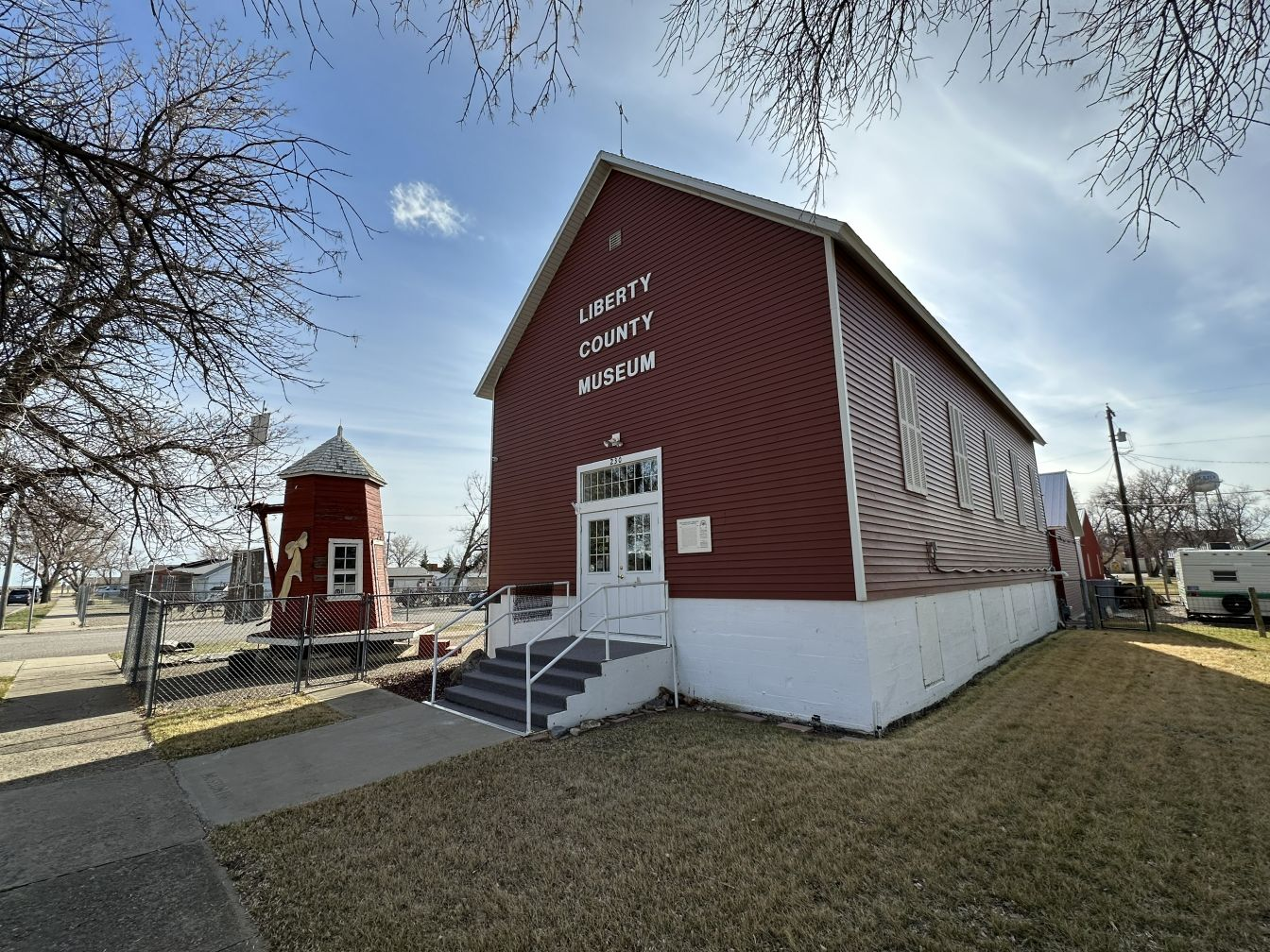

- Location within Montana Location within the United States
- Location: Junction of 2nd St. and Madison
- Coordinates: 48°30′39″N 110°57′44″W
- NRHP reference No.: 97000974
- Added to NRHP: August 29, 1997

The First Episcopal Methodist Church of Chester is a historic church located at the intersection of 2nd Street and Madison Avenue in Chester, Montana. The church was built in 1911, a year after Chester was incorporated, in response to public demand for a permanent, dedicated church building. While Chester's Episcopal Methodist congregation officially owned the building, it was also used by Chester's various other Christian denominations until they were able to build their own churches. The church has a vernacular design typical of rural Montana churches of the period and is representative of the many church buildings built in the early twentieth century during an important era of homesteading and settlement in the state. The Methodist congregation left the church for a new building in 1968.

The old church became the Liberty County Museum two years later, a museum of local history.

The church was added to the National Register of Historic Places on August 29, 1997.
