= Glendive, Montana =

City in Montana, United States

- City
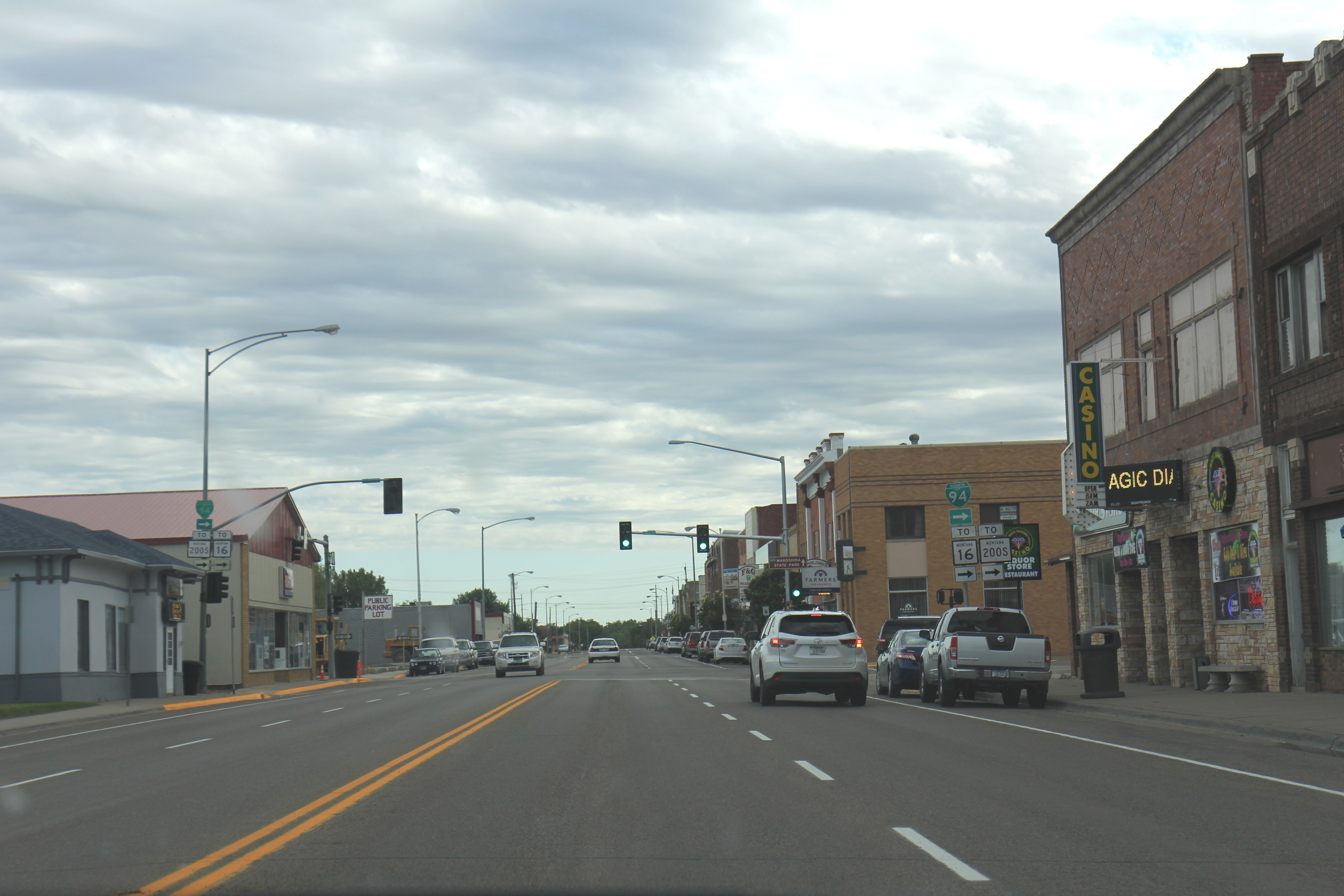
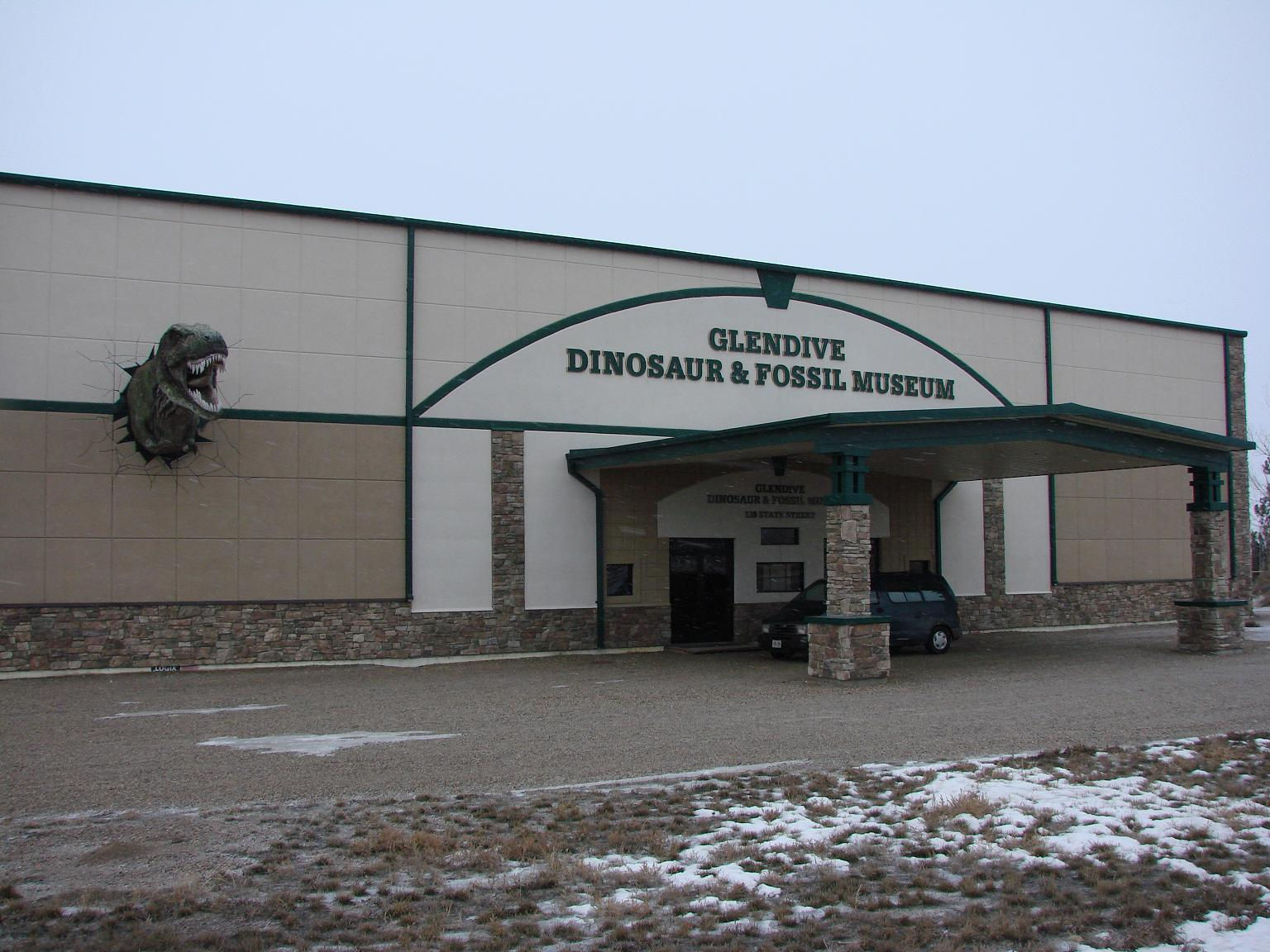
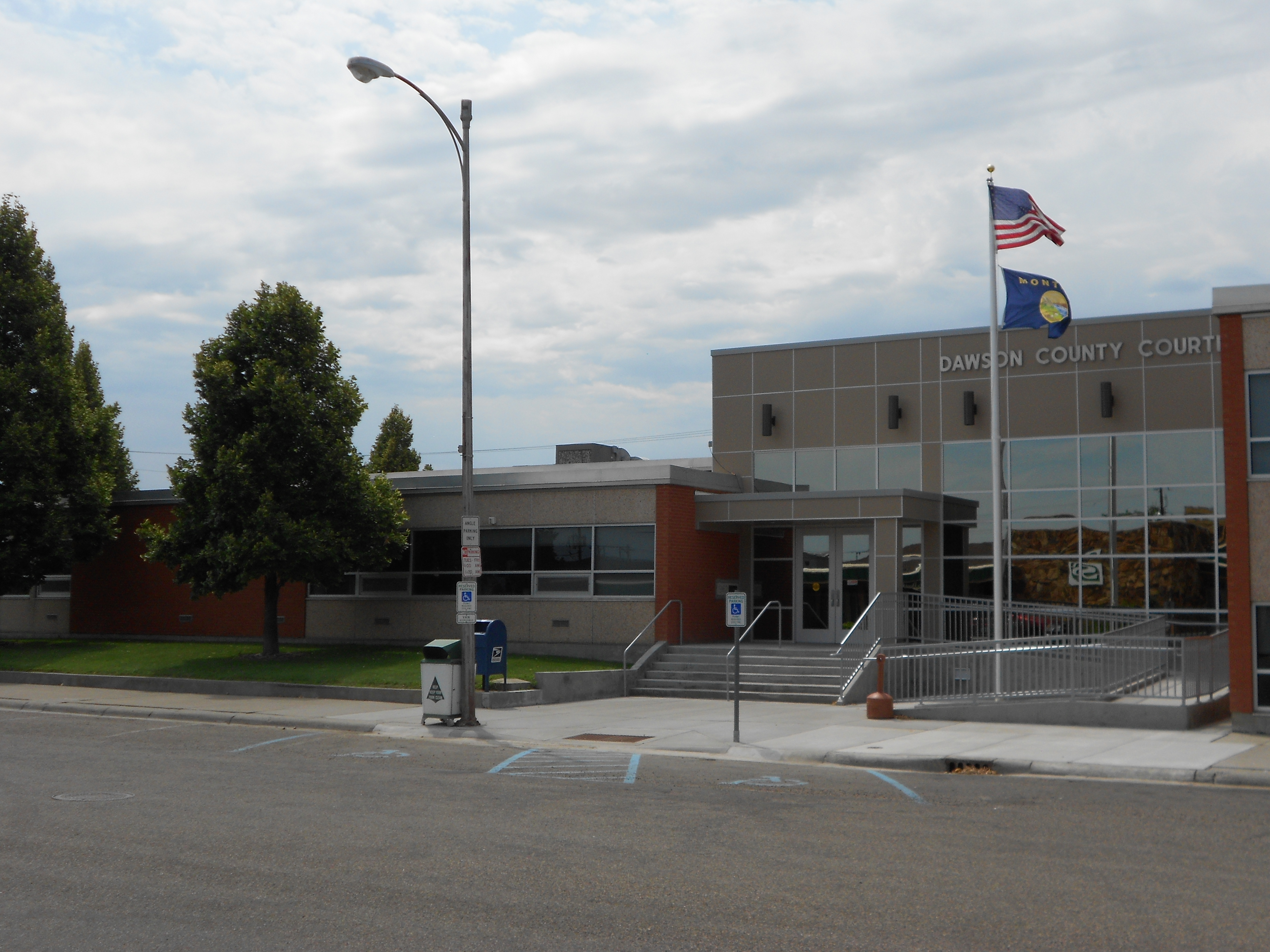
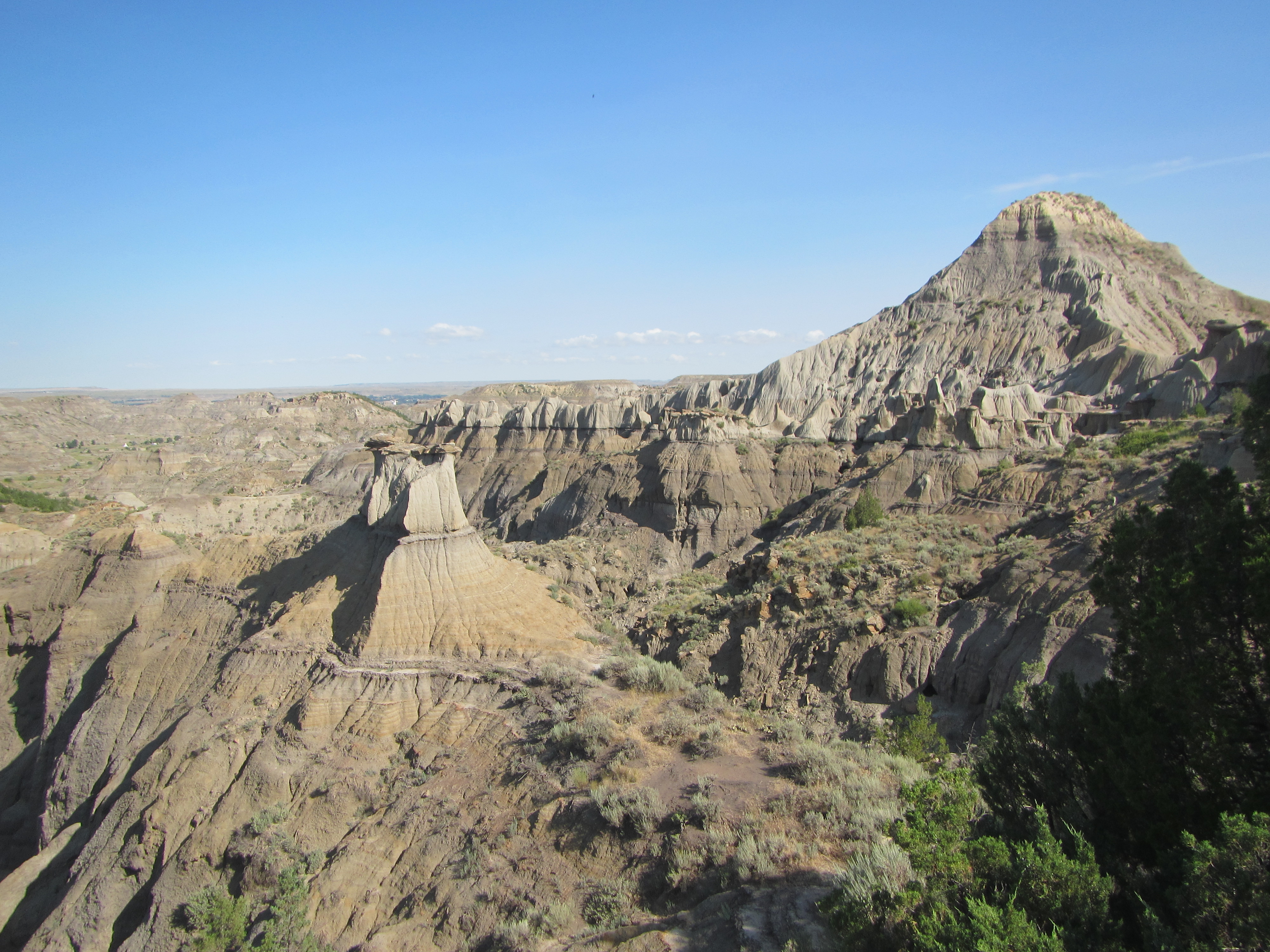
- Downtown Glendive Glendive Dinosaur and Fossil Museum Dawson County Courthouse Makoshika State Park

- Seal
- Nickname: Gate City
- Motto: Good People Surrounded by Badlands
- Interactive map of Glendive, Montana
- Coordinates: 47.106473°N 104.710856°W
- Country: United States
- State: Montana
- County: Dawson
- Founded: 1881
- Named for: Glendive Creek

Government
  - Type: Mayor–council
  - Mayor: Deb Dion
  - City Council: Joanne Hynes; Gerald Reichert; Clyde Mitchell; Jason Sasse; Mike Dryden; Doug Baker; Kevin Thompson; Rhett Coon

Area
  - City: 3.498 sq mi (9.059 km^{2})
  - Land: 3.474 sq mi (8.997 km^{2})
  - Water: 0.024 sq mi (0.063 km^{2}) 0.69%
- Elevation: 2,083 ft (635 m)

Population (2020)
  - City: 4,873
  - Estimate (2024): 4,760
  - Density: 1,403/sq mi (541.6/km^{2})
  - Urban: 6,675
  - Metro: 8,731
- Time zone: UTC−7 (Mountain (MST))
  - Summer (DST): UTC−6 (MDT)
- ZIP Code: 59330
- Area code: 406
- FIPS code: 30-31450
- GNIS feature ID: 2410600
- Website: cityofglendive.us

Glendive is a city in and the county seat of Dawson County, Montana, United States, and home to Dawson Community College. Glendive was established by the Northern Pacific Railway during the building of the railroad line. The town of Glendive is an agricultural and ranching hub of eastern Montana sited between the Yellowstone River and the Badlands. Makoshika State Park is located just east of Glendive.

The population was 4,873 at the 2020 census, and was estimated at 4,760 in 2024.

== History ==
The land has been historically inhabited by the Crow people.

Sir George Gore, a wealthy Irish "sportsman", named the local tributary to the Yellowstone River in his favorite hunting area "Glendive" in 1855. Gore killed 105 bears, 2000 buffalos and 1600 elk and deer over 11 months. The town took its name from the stream of the same name 25 years later.

The Montana territorial legislature had created Dawson County in 1869, but did not name a county seat, instead placing it administratively under Meagher County.

Glendive was established by the Northern Pacific Railway when they built the transcontinental railroad across the northern tier of the western United States from Minnesota to the Pacific Coast. The town was the headquarters for the Yellowstone Division that encompassed 875 route miles (1,408 km); 546 (879) in main line and 328 (528) in branches with the main routes from Mandan, North Dakota, to Billings, Montana, and from Billings to Livingston. There was a steamboat landing for trade to Fort Buford and the Upper Missouri River. The settlement mainly consisted of tents and log cabins covered with dirt roofs until the train station was built from 1880 until 1881. The train station architect was O. M. Rognan.

With the arrival of the first load of lumber in 1881 a building boom ensued. That same year, Glendive citizens petitioned to name it the seat of Dawson County. Between July 20 and November 30, 150 buildings were erected, though many were shacks and log cabins.

At the height of the Montana gold rush- fed cattle boom in 1884, 12,000 cattle arrived per week to stock the open range.

=== 20th century ===
Glendive was briefly an oil boom town after the discovery of oil in the Williston Basin in the early 1950s. Moving the oil out of the area was difficult and expensive though; the boom ended by 1954 and only a small reserve existed locally.

=== 21st century ===
The community has been impacted in the 2000s by the North Dakota oil boom which spurred a modest increase in the population. On January 17, 2015, Glendive was the site of a major oil spill from a pipeline which contaminated drinking water. It was not until a day later when people complained about the odor and taste of the water from the City of Glendive’s Water Treatment Plant that the spill was discovered. The Poplar pipeline by Bridger Pipeline, LLC, of Casper, Wyoming which crosses the Yellowstone River 6.5 miles North of Glendive had spilled 30,000 gallons of Bakken crude oil, which were found as far as Crane, Montana about 60 river miles downstream. It stayed on shorelines until after the spring thaw in April 2015. It contaminated fish and impacted migrating birds. In 2022, Bridger paid $2,000,000 for restoration.

On October 24, 2023, a fire destroyed the Jordan Inn and the Rose Theater, both located in the Merrill Avenue Historic District. The Inn was a complete loss.

== Geography ==
The elevation of the city is 2,083 feet (635 m). Interstate 94 passes through town with access from exits 210, 211, 213, and 215. Montana Highway 16 begins in West Glendive. The Yellowstone River cuts through town.

According to the United States Census Bureau, the city has a total area of 3.498 square miles (9.06 km^{2}), of which 3.474 square miles (9.00 km^{2}) is land and 0.024 square miles (0.062 km^{2}) (0.69%) is water.

=== Climate ===
Glendive experiences a semi-arid climate (Köppen BSk) with long, cold, dry winters and hot, wetter summers. Together with Medicine Lake, Montana, the town holds the state's all-time-high record of 117 °F (47 °C), which was recorded on July 20, 1893, in Glendive and on July 5, 1937, in Medicine Lake.

On June 29, 1961, an F4 tornado struck Glendive, causing between $500,000 and $5 million in damage.

Climate data for Glendive, Montana, 1991–2020 normals, extremes 1893–present
Month	Jan	Feb	Mar	Apr	May	Jun	Jul	Aug	Sep	Oct	Nov	Dec	Year
Record high °F (°C)	64 (18)	73 (23)	85 (29)	94 (34)	104 (40)	110 (43)	117 (47)	113 (45)	106 (41)	95 (35)	80 (27)	72 (22)	117 (47)
Mean maximum °F (°C)	50.3 (10.2)	54.4 (12.4)	69.8 (21.0)	80.6 (27.0)	87.6 (30.9)	96.0 (35.6)	101.0 (38.3)	100.6 (38.1)	95.7 (35.4)	82.8 (28.2)	65.0 (18.3)	51.6 (10.9)	103.0 (39.4)
Mean daily maximum °F (°C)	29.0 (−1.7)	33.8 (1.0)	46.2 (7.9)	58.9 (14.9)	69.1 (20.6)	78.5 (25.8)	87.7 (30.9)	87.2 (30.7)	76.3 (24.6)	59.5 (15.3)	43.5 (6.4)	32.0 (0.0)	58.5 (14.7)
Daily mean °F (°C)	19.1 (−7.2)	23.1 (−4.9)	34.6 (1.4)	46.5 (8.1)	56.9 (13.8)	66.4 (19.1)	74.0 (23.3)	72.5 (22.5)	62.1 (16.7)	47.7 (8.7)	33.6 (0.9)	22.7 (−5.2)	46.6 (8.1)
Mean daily minimum °F (°C)	9.2 (−12.7)	12.5 (−10.8)	23.0 (−5.0)	34.2 (1.2)	44.7 (7.1)	54.3 (12.4)	60.3 (15.7)	57.8 (14.3)	47.9 (8.8)	35.9 (2.2)	23.7 (−4.6)	13.3 (−10.4)	34.7 (1.5)
Mean minimum °F (°C)	−20.2 (−29.0)	−12.5 (−24.7)	−2.1 (−18.9)	18.2 (−7.7)	30.1 (−1.1)	43.1 (6.2)	50.1 (10.1)	44.9 (7.2)	33.3 (0.7)	18.8 (−7.3)	1.7 (−16.8)	−14.1 (−25.6)	−26.4 (−32.4)
Record low °F (°C)	−48 (−44)	−50 (−46)	−30 (−34)	−6 (−21)	16 (−9)	29 (−2)	37 (3)	32 (0)	14 (−10)	−13 (−25)	−27 (−33)	−42 (−41)	−50 (−46)
Average precipitation inches (mm)	0.42 (11)	0.36 (9.1)	0.52 (13)	1.50 (38)	2.57 (65)	2.40 (61)	2.20 (56)	1.53 (39)	1.43 (36)	1.09 (28)	0.46 (12)	0.41 (10)	14.89 (378.1)
Average snowfall inches (cm)	4.0 (10)	5.3 (13)	3.1 (7.9)	2.0 (5.1)	0.5 (1.3)	0.0 (0.0)	0.0 (0.0)	0.0 (0.0)	0.0 (0.0)	1.4 (3.6)	2.0 (5.1)	4.3 (11)	22.6 (57)
Average precipitation days (≥ 0.01 in)	6.1	5.9	6.0	7.9	11.4	11.7	9.2	7.0	6.7	7.5	5.1	6.0	90.5
Average snowy days (≥ 0.1 in)	4.5	4.0	2.9	0.9	0.2	0.0	0.0	0.0	0.0	0.6	2.2	3.5	18.8
Source 1: NOAA
Source 2: National Weather Service

== Demographics ==
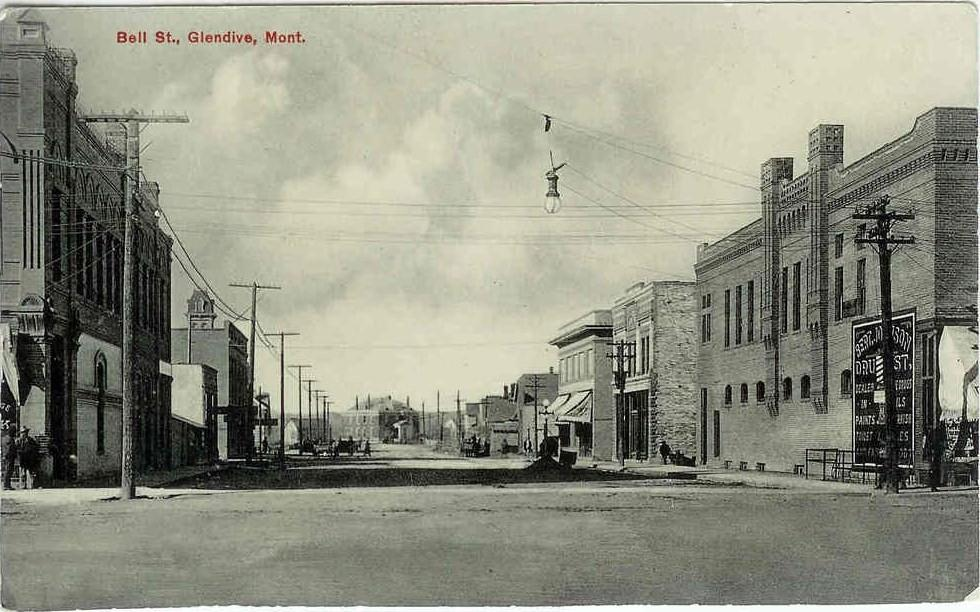
Bell Street, about 1913

Historical population
Census	Pop.	Note	%±
1880	500		—
1890	720		44.0%
1900	1,200		66.7%
1910	2,428		102.3%
1920	3,816		57.2%
1930	4,629		21.3%
1940	4,524		−2.3%
1950	5,254		16.1%
1960	7,058		34.3%
1970	6,305		−10.7%
1980	5,978		−5.2%
1990	4,802		−19.7%
2000	4,729		−1.5%
2010	4,935		4.4%
2020	4,873		−1.3%
2024 (est.)	4,760		−2.3%
Population History; U.S. Decennial Census; 2020 Census

According to realtor website Zillow, the average price of a home as of October 31, 2025, in Glendive is $186,137.

As of the 2023 American Community Survey, there are 1,975 estimated households in Glendive with an average of 2.24 persons per household. The city has a median household income of $71,063. Approximately 9.8% of the city's population lives at or below the poverty line. Glendive has an estimated 53.8% employment rate, with 25.8% of the population holding a bachelor's degree or higher and 92.3% holding a high school diploma.

The top five reported languages (people were allowed to report up to two languages, thus the figures will generally add to more than 100%) were English (99.3%), Spanish (0.1%), Indo-European (0.3%), Asian and Pacific Islander (0.0%), and Other (0.3%).

The median age in the city was 44.1 years.

=== Racial and ethnic composition ===
Glendive, Montana – racial and ethnic composition Note: the US Census treats Hispanic/Latino as an ethnic category. This table excludes Latinos from the racial categories and assigns them to a separate category. Hispanics/Latinos may be of any race.
Race / ethnicity (NH = non-Hispanic)	Pop. 1990	Pop. 2000	Pop. 2010	Pop. 2020	% 1990	% 2000	% 2010	% 2020
White alone (NH)	4,701	4,581	4,585	4,253	97.90%	96.87%	92.91%	87.28%
Black or African American alone (NH)	0	14	23	35	0.00%	0.30%	0.47%	0.72%
Native American or Alaska Native alone (NH)	40	54	108	133	0.83%	1.14%	2.19%	2.73%
Asian alone (NH)	21	5	22	41	0.44%	0.11%	0.45%	0.84%
Pacific Islander alone (NH)	—	0	3	1	—	0.00%	0.06%	0.02%
Other race alone (NH)	0	0	1	11	0.00%	0.00%	0.02%	0.23%
Mixed race or multiracial (NH)	—	27	74	195	—	0.57%	1.50%	4.00%
Hispanic or Latino (any race)	40	48	119	204	0.83%	1.02%	2.41%	4.19%
Total	4,802	4,729	4,935	4,873	100.00%	100.00%	100.00%	100.00%

=== 2020 census ===
As of the 2020 census, there were 4,873 people, 1,953 households, and 1,093 families residing in the city. The median age was 38.6 years. 21.6% of residents were under the age of 18 and 19.4% were 65 years of age or older. For every 100 females there were 104.9 males, and for every 100 females age 18 and over there were 105.2 males age 18 and over.

99.8% of residents lived in urban areas, while 0.2% lived in rural areas.

Of all households, 26.6% had children under the age of 18 living in them, 43.0% were married-couple households, 20.2% were households with a male householder and no spouse or partner present, and 28.8% were households with a female householder and no spouse or partner present. About 37.3% of all households were made up of individuals, and 17.3% had someone living alone who was 65 years of age or older.

There were 2,323 housing units, of which 15.9% were vacant. The homeowner vacancy rate was 3.1% and the rental vacancy rate was 15.0%. The population density was 1,402.71 inhabitants per square mile (541.6/km^{2}), and the housing-unit density was 668.68 per square mile (258.2/km^{2}).

=== 2010 census ===
As of the 2010 census, there were 4,935 people, 2,060 households, and 1,190 families residing in the city. The population density was 1,487.34 inhabitants per square mile (574.3/km^{2}). There were 2,267 housing units at an average density of 683.24 per square mile (263.8/km^{2}). The racial makeup of the city was 94.45% White, 0.51% African American, 2.37% Native American, 0.45% Asian, 0.06% Pacific Islander, 0.32% from some other races and 1.84% from two or more races. Hispanic or Latino people of any race were 2.41% of the population.

There were 2,060 households, of which 25.8% had children under the age of 18 living with them, 45.4% were married couples living together, 8.3% had a female householder with no husband present, 4.1% had a male householder with no wife present, and 42.2% were non-families. 37.9% of all households were made up of individuals, and 17% had someone living alone who was 65 years of age or older. The average household size was 2.15 and the average family size was 2.84.

The median age in the city was 41.2 years. 19.9% of residents were under the age of 18; 12% were between the ages of 18 and 24; 22.7% were from 25 to 44; 26.5% were from 45 to 64; and 18.8% were 65 years of age or older. The gender makeup of the city was 50.4% male and 49.6% female.

=== 2000 census ===
As of the 2000 census, there were 4,729 people, 1,983 households, and 1,229 families residing in the city. The population density was 1,419.03 inhabitants per square mile (547.9/km^{2}). There were 2,204 housing units at an average density of 661.35 per square mile (255.3/km^{2}). The racial makeup of the city was 97.38% White, 0.30% African American, 1.21% Native American, 0.11% Asian, 0.00% Pacific Islander, 0.36% from some other races and 0.66% from two or more races. Hispanic or Latino people of any race were 1.02% of the population.

There were 1,983 households, out of which 27.4% had children under the age of 18 living with them, 50.7% were married couples living together, 8.3% had a female householder with no husband present, and 38.0% were non-families. 34.2% of all households were made up of individuals, and 14.9% had someone living alone who was 65 years of age or older. The average household size was 2.22 and the average family size was 2.86.

In the city, the population was spread out, with 21.7% under the age of 18, 10.6% from 18 to 24, 23.3% from 25 to 44, 23.6% from 45 to 64, and 20.7% who were 65 years of age or older. The median age was 42 years. For every 100 females there were 92.5 males. For every 100 females age 18 and over, there were 91.6 males.

The median income for a household in the city was $30,943, and the median income for a family was $40,313. Males had a median income of $30,977 versus $20,132 for females. The per capita income for the city was $15,544. About 11.6% of families and 14.8% of the population were below the poverty line, including 17.8% of those under age 18 and 10.3% of those age 65 or over.

== Government ==
Glendive has a commission-executive form of government with a mayor and city council. There are four wards each represented by two council members. The mayor and council are elected to four year terms. In November 2026 voters opted to keep eight council members rather than reduce the number to six.

Deb Dion became mayor in October 2023. Dion was appointed to serve the remainder of Teresa Olson's term after Olson resigned.

== Education ==
Glendive Public Schools educates students from kindergarten through 12th grade. Dawson County High School's team name is the Red Devils.

Glendive is home to Dawson Community College, a 2-year college formed in 1940 to meet the educational needs of eastern Montana. The college offers Associate of Arts, Associate of Science, and Associate of Applied Science degrees as well as certificate programs. Dawson Community College is an open-access college.

Glendive Public Library serves the area.

== Infrastructure ==
Dawson Community Airport is five miles northwest of Glendive.

Intercity bus service to the city is provided by Jefferson Lines.

== Media ==
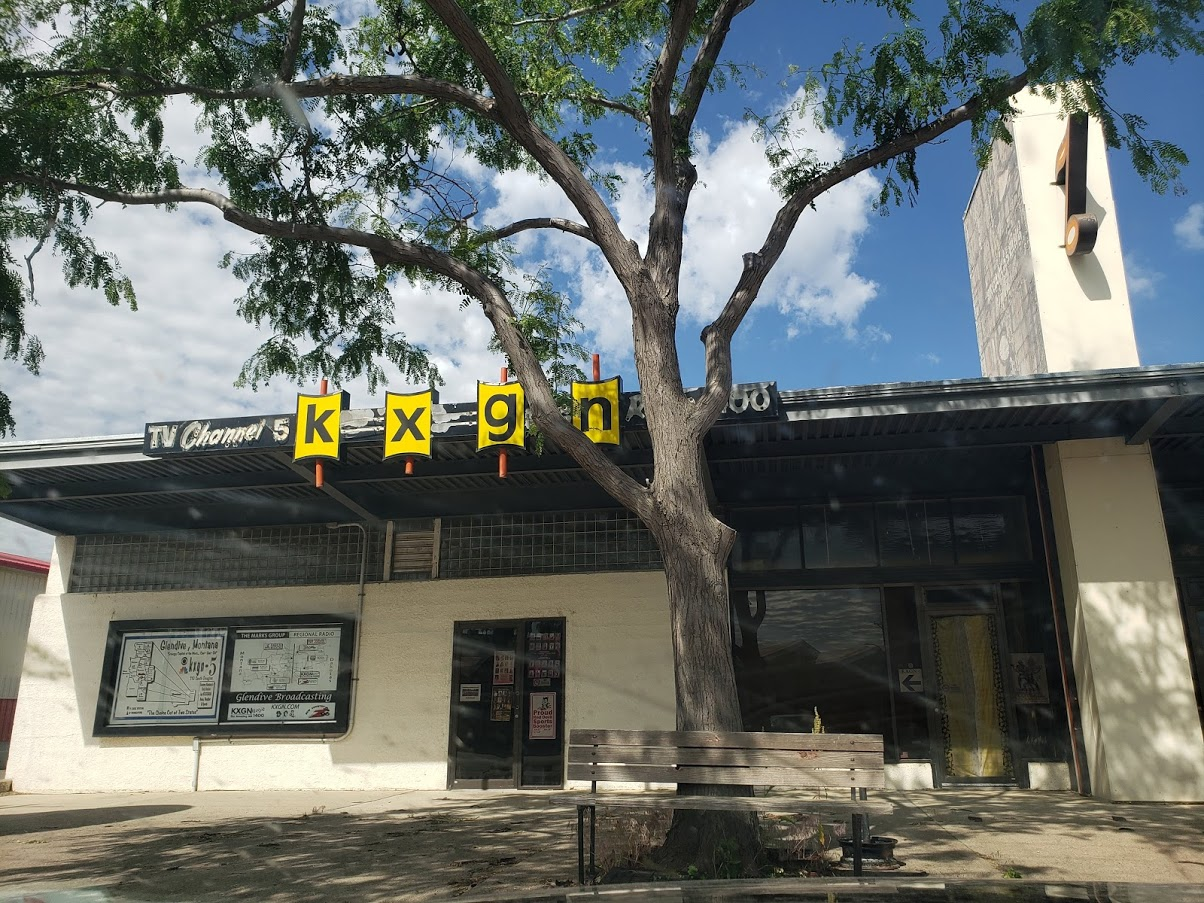
KXGN-TV is the only television station in the Glendive television market

The Glendive market has three local radio stations:

- KGLE AM 590
- KXGN AM 1400
- KDZN FM 96.5

Glendive is the smallest of the 210 designated markets for broadcast television in the United States as designated by Nielsen Media Research, with one station—Montana PBS member KXGN-TV 5—for a small potential audience of several thousand people (county population is 9,059). Previously, KXGN-TV was dual-affiliated with CBS and NBC, carrying the two networks on separate subchannels. Until September 2009, KXGN-TV carried both networks on the same feed, making it the last "Big 3" affiliate to offer programming from more than one network on a single feed. KXGN-TV dropped NBC at the beginning of 2025 and CBS later in the year, making Glendive the only television market in the United States without any commercial television stations.

K13PL channel 13, a translator (low-powered rebroadcaster) of Williston, North Dakota's NBC affiliate KUMV was also available until 2013; KUMV is still carried on area cable systems as the market's default NBC affiliate. Two stations in Billings also serve Glendive: ABC affiliate/CW+ O&O KSVI 6 and Fox affiliate KHMT 4.

The Glendive Ranger-Review is the local paper.

== Notable people ==
- Herbert Aldinger, author
- Tim M. Babcock, 16th Governor of Montana, grew up on a ranch and later a house in Glendive, graduate of Dawson County High School in Glendive
- Kamran Ince, Turkish-American music composer
- Clyde Lamb, cartoonist
- Adam Morrison, NBA Basketball Player
- John Patton, Wyoming state legislator
- Alfred E. Perlman, President, New York Central Railroad, President Western Pacific Railroad
- Mike Person, offensive lineman for the San Francisco 49ers
- Matt Rosendale, former Montana State Auditor, 2018 Republican nominee for U.S. Senate in Montana, and U.S. Representative for Montana's at-large congressional district (2020–2025)
- Diana Thomas, mathematician and nutritionist
- Joyce Woodhouse, Democratic member of the Nevada Senate
- Hank Worden, born Norton Earl Worden, cowboy actor

== See also ==
- Glendive Dinosaur and Fossil Museum
- Merrill Avenue Historic District (Glendive, Montana)
