= Miles City Waterworks Building and Pumping Plant Park =

- U.S. National Register of Historic Places
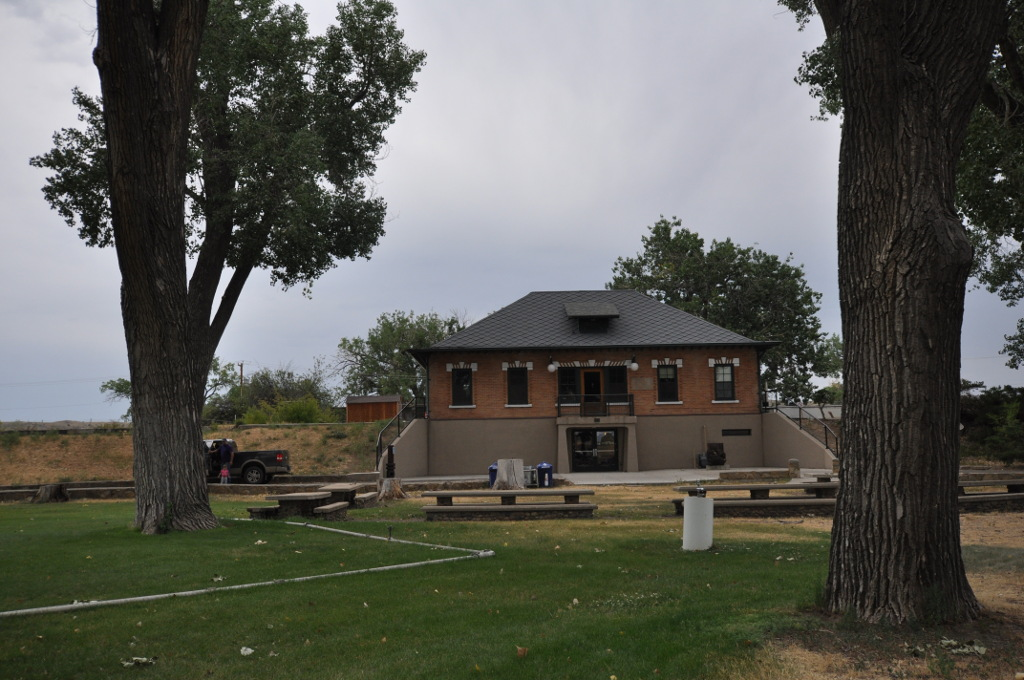

- Location within Montana Location within the United States
- Location: West of Miles City, Montana on Pumping Plant Rd..
- Coordinates: 46°24′22″N 105°52′5″W
- Area: 5 acres (2.0 ha)
- Built: 1911
- Built by: Levell, W.D.
- Engineer: G.C. Pruett (City engineer) and Burns & McConnell (consulting)
- NRHP reference No.: 79003723
- Added to NRHP: September 26, 1979

The Miles City Waterworks Building and Pumping Plant Park is a National Registered Historic Place located in Miles City, Montana. It served as waterworks for Miles City from 1911 to 1974, and was added to the Register on September 26, 1979.

== WaterWorks Art Museum ==
The building is currently being used as the WaterWorks Art Museum, formerly known as the Custer County Art and Heritage Center.

The museum features exhibitions of regional and national art and changing exhibitions drawn from its permanent collections. The collections include photos of area Native Americans, immigrant settlers and city builders prior to the 1950s, and a contemporary collection of regional art from the mid-1900s through the present. Art classes and outreach programs are offered for children and adults.
