= KGLE =

Religious radio station in Glendive, Montana

- Glendive, Montana; United States
- Broadcast area: Eastern Montana and Western North Dakota
- Frequency: 590 kHz

Programming
- Format: Religious
- Network: Your Network of Praise
- Affiliations: Moody Broadcasting Network

Ownership
- Owner: Hi-Line Radio Fellowship, Inc.

History
- First air date: August 22, 1962
- Call sign meaning: Glendive

Technical information
- Licensing authority: FCC
- Facility ID: 11016
- Class: D
- Power: 1000 watts (day); 111 watts (night)
- Transmitter coordinates: 47°5′50″N 104°47′10.9″W

Links
- Public license information: Public file; LMS
- Webcast: Listen live
- Website: www.ynop.org

KGLE (590 AM) is a radio station licensed to serve Glendive, Montana. The station is owned by Hi-Line Radio Fellowship, Inc. It airs a religious radio format as part of Your Network of Praise, including programming from Moody Broadcasting Network.

The station was assigned the KGLE call letters by the Federal Communications Commission.
