= Dawson County, Montana =

County in Montana, United States

- County
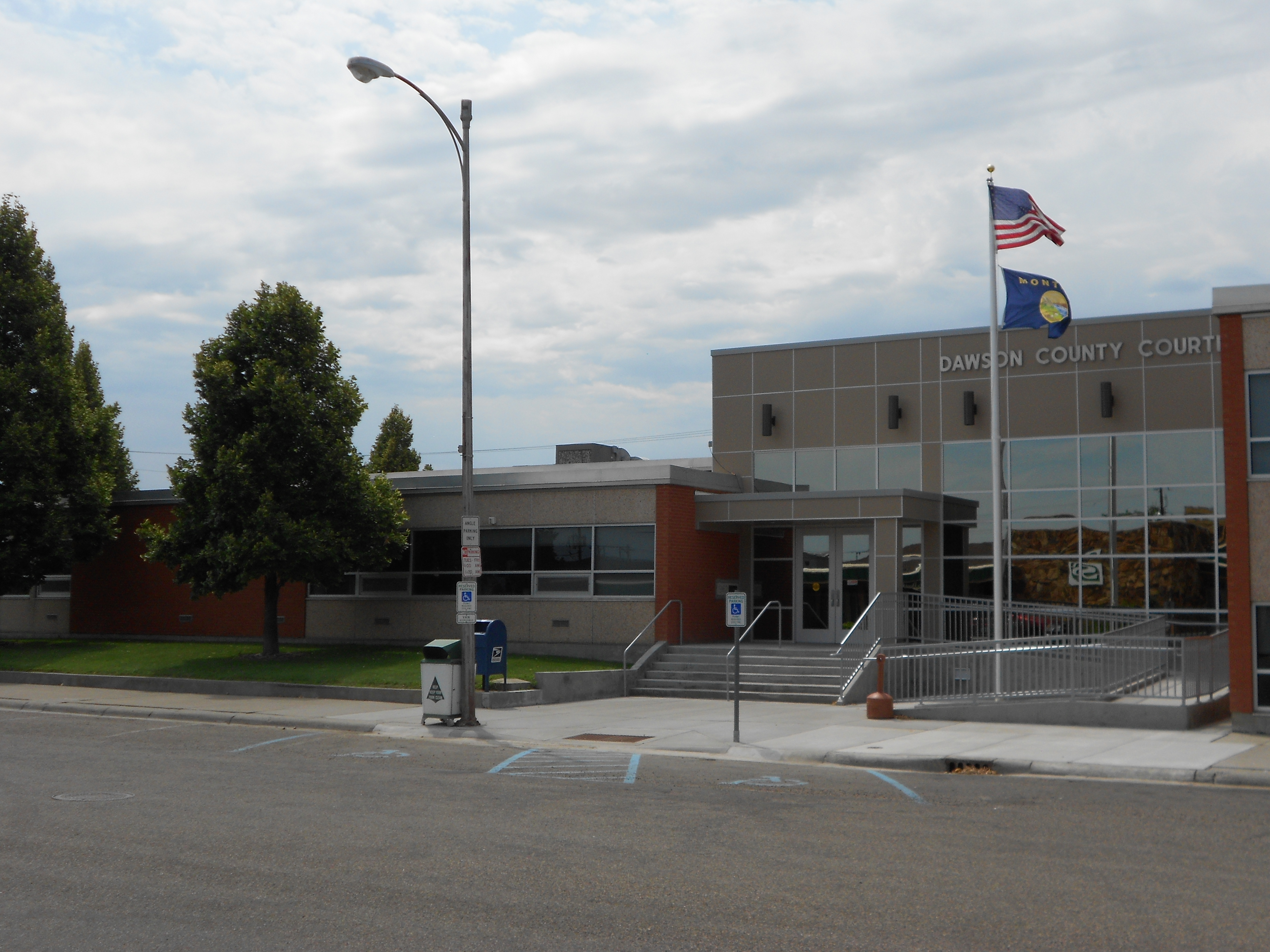
- Dawson County Courthouse in Glendive

- Location within the U.S. state of Montana
- Coordinates: 47°16′N 104°54′W
- Country: United States
- State: Montana
- Founded: January 15, 1869
- Named for: Andrew Dawson
- Seat: Glendive
- Largest city: Glendive

Area
  - Total: 2,383 sq mi (6,170 km^{2})
  - Land: 2,372 sq mi (6,140 km^{2})
  - Water: 11 sq mi (28 km^{2}) 0.5%

Population (2020)
  - Total: 8,940
  - Estimate (2025): 8,692 ▼
  - Density: 3.77/sq mi (1.46/km^{2})
- Time zone: UTC−7 (Mountain)
  - Summer (DST): UTC−6 (MDT)
- Congressional district: 2nd
- Website: www.dawsonmt.gov
- Montana county number 16

Dawson County is a county located in the U.S. state of Montana. As of the 2020 census, the population was 8,940. Its county seat is Glendive.

== History ==
Dawson County was the tenth county organized in Montana Territory. It was created January 15, 1869, four and a half years after Montana Territory was organized. Before the formation of Dawson county, the area was the northern half of the original Big Horn County. Dawson takes its name from Major Andrew Dawson, manager of the Fort Benton Trading Post for the American Fur Company from 1856 to 1864.

Between 1910 and 1920 the population increased from 2,500 to 25,000.

Parts of Dawson County were taken to form Valley County in 1893, Richland County and part of Wibaux County in 1914, part of Prairie County in 1915, and Garfield County and part of McCone County in 1919.

== Geography ==
According to the United States Census Bureau, the county has a total area of 2,383 square miles (6,170 km^{2}), of which 2,372 square miles (6,140 km^{2}) is land and 11 square miles (28 km^{2}) (0.5%) is water.

Dawson County is located in the extreme eastern portion of Montana, about fifteen to twenty miles west of the Dakota line.

Dawson County contains part of Montana's badlands. Makoshika State Park is an example of that area's unusual rock formations. Dawson County's principal water sources are the Yellowstone River, which bisects its southeastern section, and the Redwater River in its northwest corner. Numerous creeks are tributary to these streams, furnishing abundant and accessible facilities watering livestock and for small irrigation enterprises and water conservation projects. In the upper bench lands, artesian well irrigation has received considerable attention.

The largest Triceratops skull ever found was discovered in 1992 and excavated in 2003 in Dawson County, Montana, in the famous Hell Creek Formation. It is a 65-million-year-old male Triceratops skull, 9.2 feet long, 5.2 feet high and 4.6 feet wide and weighing over 600 kg. It has been dubbed 'Dragon King' and is understood to be the most expensive skull to ever trade privately.

=== Major highways ===
- Interstate 94
- U.S. Highway 10 (Former)
- Montana Highway 16
- Montana Highway 200
- Montana Highway 200S (Alternate)
- Montana Highway 254

In 1920, Dawson County was traversed by the National Parks Highway or Red Trail, the Black Trail, the Green Trail and the Blue Trail, all of which passed through Glendive.

=== Transit ===
- Jefferson Lines

=== Adjacent counties ===
- Richland County - north
- Wibaux County - east
- Prairie County - south
- McCone County - west

== Demographics ==
Historical population
Census	Pop.	Note	%±
1890	2,056		—
1900	2,443		18.8%
1910	12,725		420.9%
1920	9,239		−27.4%
1930	9,881		6.9%
1940	8,618		−12.8%
1950	9,092		5.5%
1960	12,314		35.4%
1970	11,269		−8.5%
1980	11,805		4.8%
1990	9,505		−19.5%
2000	9,059		−4.7%
2010	8,966		−1.0%
2020	8,940		−0.3%
2025 (est.)	8,692	▼	−2.8%
U.S. Decennial Census; 1790–1960, 1900–1990, 1990–2000, 2010–2020

=== 2020 census ===
As of the 2020 census, the county had a population of 8,940. Of the residents, 22.0% were under the age of 18 and 20.5% were 65 years of age or older; the median age was 41.3 years. For every 100 females there were 106.4 males, and for every 100 females age 18 and over there were 106.2 males. 74.7% of residents lived in urban areas and 25.3% lived in rural areas. The racial makeup of the county was 90.4% White, 0.5% Black or African American, 2.0% American Indian and Alaska Native, 0.6% Asian, 1.1% from some other race, and 5.4% from two or more races. Hispanic or Latino residents of any race comprised 3.2% of the population. There were 3,658 households in the county, of which 27.0% had children under the age of 18 living with them and 22.3% had a female householder with no spouse or partner present. About 31.8% of all households were made up of individuals and 14.2% had someone living alone who was 65 years of age or older. There were 4,382 housing units, of which 16.5% were vacant. Among occupied housing units, 71.5% were owner-occupied and 28.5% were renter-occupied. The homeowner vacancy rate was 2.5% and the rental vacancy rate was 15.0%.

=== 2010 census ===
As of the 2010 census, there were 8,966 people, 3,749 households, and 2,429 families living in the county. The population density was 3.8 inhabitants per square mile (1.5/km^{2}). There were 4,233 housing units at an average density of 1.8 per square mile (0.69/km^{2}). The racial makeup of the county was 95.7% white, 1.7% American Indian, 0.3% black or African American, 0.3% Asian, 0.3% from other races, and 1.6% from two or more races. Those of Hispanic or Latino origin made up 2.0% of the population. In terms of ancestry, 46.6% were German, 16.3% were Norwegian, 15.5% were Irish, 8.2% were English, and 6.5% were American.

Of the 3,749 households, 26.8% had children under the age of 18 living with them, 54.1% were married couples living together, 6.7% had a female householder with no husband present, 35.2% were non-families, and 31.2% of all households were made up of individuals. The average household size was 2.26 and the average family size was 2.82. The median age was 43.5 years.

The median income for a household in the county was $50,752 and the median income for a family was $63,982. Males had a median income of $45,222 versus $30,993 for females. The per capita income for the county was $24,602. About 7.4% of families and 9.3% of the population were below the poverty line, including 15.5% of those under age 18 and 9.6% of those age 65 or over.

== Politics ==
United States presidential election results for Dawson County, Montana
Year	Republican		Democratic		Third party(ies)	
Year	No.	%	No.	%	No.	%
1904	769	77.44%	189	19.03%	35	3.52%
1908	927	63.67%	439	30.15%	90	6.18%
1912	678	24.37%	719	25.84%	1,385	49.78%
1916	2,105	41.06%	2,835	55.30%	187	3.65%
1920	1,784	63.92%	875	31.35%	132	4.73%
1924	1,326	50.63%	346	13.21%	947	36.16%
1928	2,207	67.16%	1,065	32.41%	14	0.43%
1932	1,470	42.52%	1,929	55.80%	58	1.68%
1936	1,221	35.81%	2,169	63.61%	20	0.59%
1940	1,612	47.52%	1,765	52.03%	15	0.44%
1944	1,549	52.92%	1,362	46.53%	16	0.55%
1948	1,555	51.54%	1,397	46.30%	65	2.15%
1952	2,396	65.50%	1,247	34.09%	15	0.41%
1956	2,463	56.08%	1,929	43.92%	0	0.00%
1960	2,460	53.69%	2,108	46.01%	14	0.31%
1964	1,938	41.79%	2,691	58.03%	8	0.17%
1968	2,650	58.01%	1,695	37.11%	223	4.88%
1972	3,207	63.96%	1,685	33.61%	122	2.43%
1976	2,639	53.21%	2,201	44.38%	120	2.42%
1980	3,045	59.50%	1,543	30.15%	530	10.36%
1984	3,468	65.26%	1,776	33.42%	70	1.32%
1988	2,658	54.40%	2,120	43.39%	108	2.21%
1992	1,679	34.62%	1,785	36.80%	1,386	28.58%
1996	1,890	40.45%	1,903	40.72%	880	18.83%
2000	2,723	63.76%	1,364	31.94%	184	4.31%
2004	2,884	64.32%	1,494	33.32%	106	2.36%
2008	2,639	59.38%	1,593	35.85%	212	4.77%
2012	3,029	68.48%	1,219	27.56%	175	3.96%
2016	3,320	75.30%	787	17.85%	302	6.85%
2020	3,758	77.89%	962	19.94%	105	2.18%
2024	3,627	78.20%	894	19.28%	117	2.52%

Dawson County has three districts each represented by a County Commissioner.

In the November 2026 elections, voters opted to keep the existing partisan elections for county officials.

== Economy ==
Dawson County is known for its dryland grain, coal mines and gas and oil wells. There are 522 current farms and ranches, and 296 commercial businesses.

Lying in the heart of the western third of the Fort Union Formation, Dawson County is plentifully supplied with lignite coal. Local natural gas has supplied Glendive since at least 1920. Excellent clays for pottery and brick-making are also found in the county.

From early days, Dawson County was known as a splendid stock county, because of the native cover of a heavy and nutritious grass. Unlike some other parts of the state, the livestock industry did not die out. In the early 20th century, the county was known for pure-bred stock raising, dairying, and the production of hogs and poultry.

While there is some broken land around the Sheep Bluffs, in the northwestern part of the county, and east of the Yellowstone, smooth prairies and rolling land predominated in the county, making conditions excellent for farming purposes. The dark sandy loam soil, with a heavy clay subsoil, was a big producer.

The principal crops in the early years of the 20th century were barley, oats and wheat. Sixty per cent of the land was tillable, and the remainder afforded good grazing. In 1905 the Bureau of Reclamation developed the Lower Yellowstone Irrigation Project. As of 1920, the headgates were located at Intake, in Dawson County, and the project irrigated approximately 90,000 acres. Unirrigated land was also producing excellent crops, with up to 400 bushels of potatoes in one acre of unirrigated land. In 1915, Dawson County won first and second prizes on Northwestern Dent corn at the St. Paul Corn Show, and in December of the following year, at the First National Corn Show, held at the same city, took first and second prizes and three third prizes. In 1920, it was estimated that the acreage planted in corn in Dawson County alone was as great as the corn acreage for the entire state in 1910.

== Education ==
Dawson Community College is located in Glendive.

== Communities ==
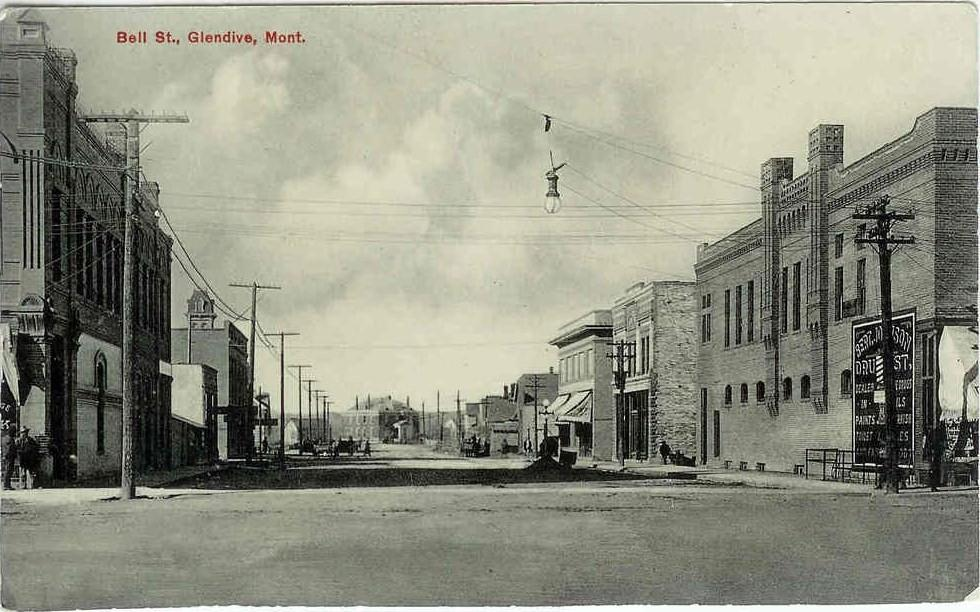
1913 postcard of Glendive

=== City ===
- Glendive (county seat)

=== Town ===
- Richey

=== Census-designated place ===
- Bloomfield
- Lindsay
- West Glendive

== See also ==
- List of lakes in Dawson County, Montana
- List of mountains in Dawson County, Montana
- National Register of Historic Places listings in Dawson County, Montana
