= Makoshika State Park =

State park in Montana, United States

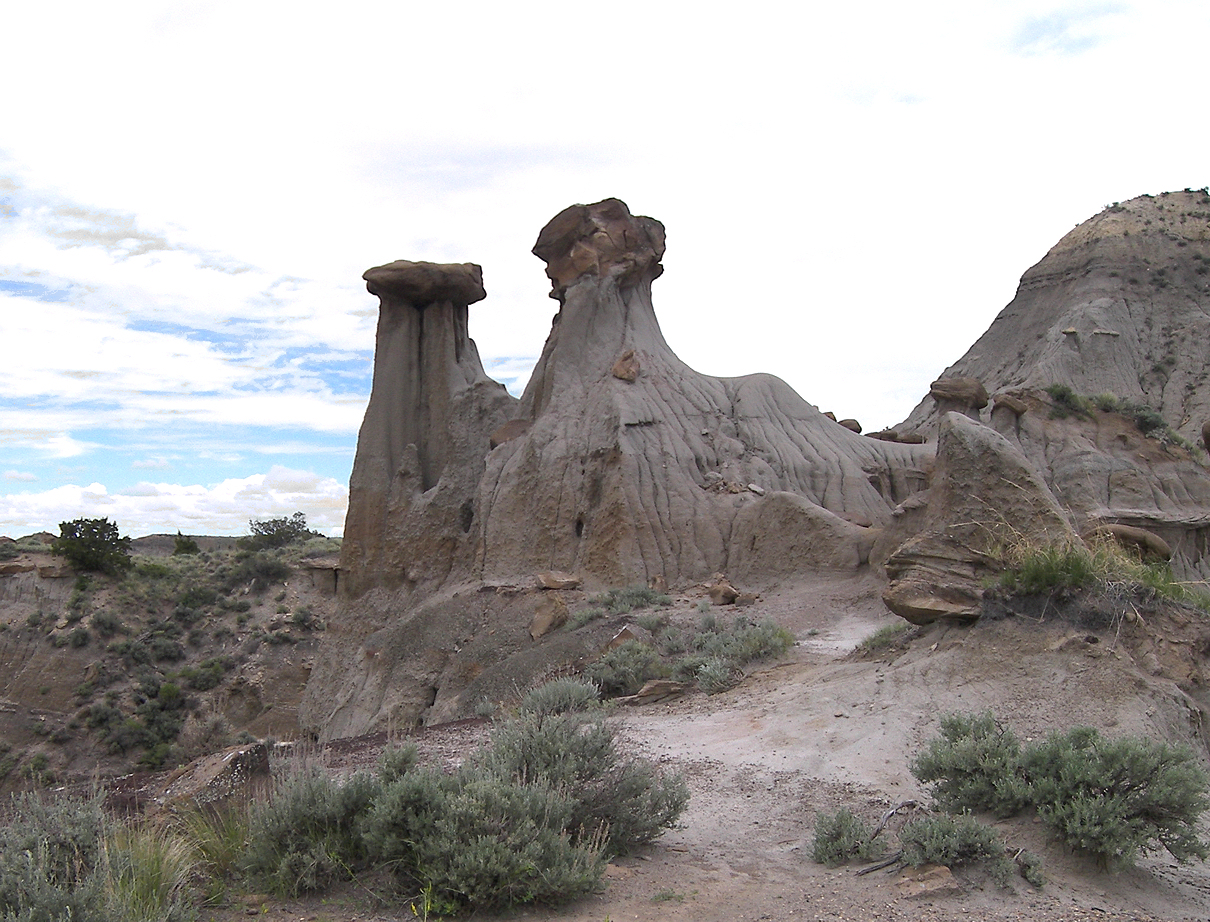
- Rock formations in the park

- Location within Montana
- Location: Dawson County, Montana, United States
- Nearest city: Glendive, Montana
- Coordinates: 47°03′20″N 104°40′38″W
- Area: 11,538 acres (4,669 ha)
- Elevation: 2,566 ft (782 m)
- Designation: Montana state park
- Established: 1953
- Visitors: 93,150 (in 2023)
- Administrator: Montana Fish, Wildlife & Parks
- Website: Makoshika State Park

Makoshika State Park ("ma-KO-sh(ih)kuh" from the Lakota Mako sica, meaning 'bad land' or 'land that is bad') is a nature preserve and public recreation area located on the southeast side of Glendive in Dawson County, Montana. The state park encompasses badlands containing dinosaur fossils and rock from the Hell Creek Formation. It is the largest of Montana's state parks at more than 11,000 acres (45 km^{2}).

== Park history ==
In 1938, the site was proposed as a Badlands National Park by the Glendive Chamber of Commerce. Chamber secretary K. E. Burleigh wrote to federal officials, requesting that they "inspect our proposed bad-lands park, we would be very glad to show it to them and we would appreciate any efforts on your part to have a park established near Glendive, as you know we are very short on scenery and places of interest, and I believe it would be one way to stop tourists in Glendive for a day or two." However, the National Park Service regional office determined that the location was "not of national significance."

The site became a state park in 1939, when Dawson County donated an initial 160 acres to the state. Another 80 acres were donated by the county in 1953. The state acquired additional lands from the U.S. Bureau of Land Management, Dawson County, and private landowners over the course of the following five decades.

== Fossil discoveries ==
Dinosaur fossils discovered in and near the park include examples of Triceratops and Thescelosaurus. A 600-pound juvenile female triceratops skull measuring 5.5 feet long was unearthed in 1991. The skull is displayed in the park's visitor center. In 1997, a fossil Thescelosaurus considered to be the largest and most complete skeleton of its kind was found by an expedition led by Jack Horner and Bob Harmon.

== Wildlife ==
Turkey vultures, prairie falcons, and golden eagles make their home in the park.

== Activities and amenities ==
The park features a visitors center with geology and fossil displays, scenic drives, nature trails, campground, archery area, amphitheater, and picnicking facilities. Events include the annual "Buzzard Day" celebration.

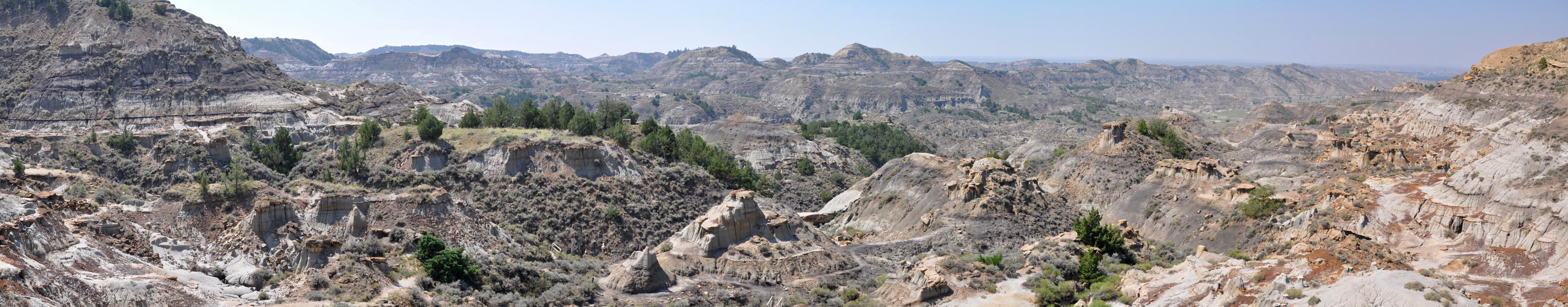
Panorama of part of Makoshika State Park in eastern Montana. View is to the west from the Cap Rock Trailhead.
