= KYUS =

KYUS may refer to:

- KYUS-FM, a radio station (92.3 FM) licensed to Miles City, Montana
- KYUS-TV, a television station (channel 3) licensed to Miles City, Montana
