= Cohagen, Montana =

- Unincorporated community
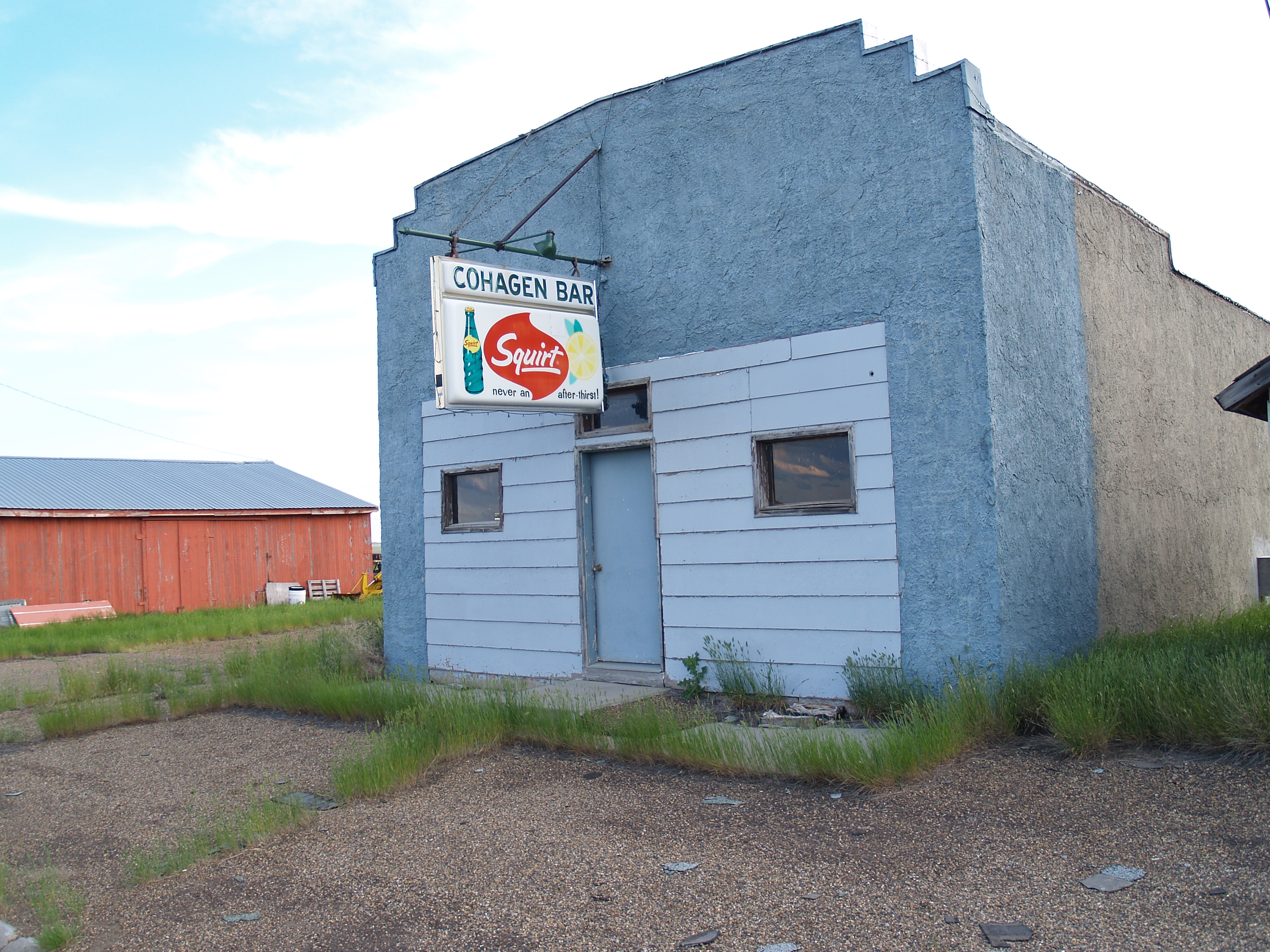
- Cohagen Bar in Cohagen, Montana

- Location within Montana Location within the United States
- Coordinates: 47°03′16″N 106°37′03″W
- Country: United States
- State: Montana
- County: Garfield
- Elevation: 2,723 ft (830 m)
- Time zone: UTC-7 (Mountain (MST))
  - Summer (DST): UTC-6 (MDT)
- ZIP codes: 59322
- GNIS feature ID: 806931

Cohagen is an unincorporated community in southeastern Garfield County, Montana, United States. It lies along Highway 59 southeast of the town of Jordan, the county seat of Garfield County.

== History ==
Cohagen's post office, with the ZIP code of 59322, opened on August 18, 1905. The town name is the mother's maiden name of the first postmaster Harry Harris.

In September 2020, Cohagen was evacuated due to wildfire threat.

== Climate ==
According to the Köppen Climate Classification system, Cohagen has a semi-arid climate, abbreviated "BSk" on climate maps.

Climate data for Cohagen, Montana, 1991–2020 normals, extremes 1967–present
Month	Jan	Feb	Mar	Apr	May	Jun	Jul	Aug	Sep	Oct	Nov	Dec	Year
Record high °F (°C)	68 (20)	74 (23)	83 (28)	91 (33)	102 (39)	109 (43)	110 (43)	109 (43)	106 (41)	93 (34)	80 (27)	81 (27)	110 (43)
Mean maximum °F (°C)	52.3 (11.3)	55.7 (13.2)	69.1 (20.6)	78.7 (25.9)	86.4 (30.2)	94.7 (34.8)	100.4 (38.0)	99.5 (37.5)	94.9 (34.9)	82.0 (27.8)	67.3 (19.6)	54.6 (12.6)	102.2 (39.0)
Mean daily maximum °F (°C)	30.7 (−0.7)	34.1 (1.2)	46.1 (7.8)	56.9 (13.8)	66.7 (19.3)	76.1 (24.5)	85.8 (29.9)	85.1 (29.5)	73.8 (23.2)	58.3 (14.6)	43.7 (6.5)	32.9 (0.5)	57.5 (14.2)
Daily mean °F (°C)	18.7 (−7.4)	21.9 (−5.6)	32.8 (0.4)	42.9 (6.1)	52.6 (11.4)	61.9 (16.6)	69.8 (21.0)	68.4 (20.2)	57.7 (14.3)	44.3 (6.8)	30.9 (−0.6)	20.9 (−6.2)	43.6 (6.4)
Mean daily minimum °F (°C)	6.8 (−14.0)	9.8 (−12.3)	19.4 (−7.0)	28.8 (−1.8)	38.5 (3.6)	47.8 (8.8)	53.8 (12.1)	51.8 (11.0)	41.5 (5.3)	30.3 (−0.9)	18.2 (−7.7)	9.0 (−12.8)	29.6 (−1.3)
Mean minimum °F (°C)	−23.7 (−30.9)	−15.0 (−26.1)	−4.3 (−20.2)	15.4 (−9.2)	23.7 (−4.6)	36.8 (2.7)	44.3 (6.8)	38.6 (3.7)	26.4 (−3.1)	12.5 (−10.8)	−7.2 (−21.8)	−17.6 (−27.6)	−30.1 (−34.5)
Record low °F (°C)	−44 (−42)	−42 (−41)	−35 (−37)	−11 (−24)	13 (−11)	28 (−2)	36 (2)	28 (−2)	13 (−11)	−16 (−27)	−29 (−34)	−46 (−43)	−46 (−43)
Average precipitation inches (mm)	0.31 (7.9)	0.28 (7.1)	0.42 (11)	1.11 (28)	2.33 (59)	2.27 (58)	1.61 (41)	1.12 (28)	1.12 (28)	1.06 (27)	0.40 (10)	0.31 (7.9)	12.34 (312.9)
Average snowfall inches (cm)	5.2 (13)	3.8 (9.7)	3.4 (8.6)	2.1 (5.3)	0.6 (1.5)	0.0 (0.0)	0.0 (0.0)	0.0 (0.0)	0.0 (0.0)	1.2 (3.0)	3.1 (7.9)	5.2 (13)	24.6 (62)
Average precipitation days (≥ 0.01 in)	4.3	4.2	5.0	6.3	9.0	9.2	6.6	4.8	5.2	5.5	4.1	3.3	67.5
Average snowy days (≥ 0.1 in)	2.6	2.6	1.8	0.7	0.2	0.0	0.0	0.0	0.1	0.6	1.7	2.4	12.7
Source 1: NOAA
Source 2: National Weather Service
