= Short Lane (company) =

Firearms accessories manufacturer

Short Lane, LLC
- Trade name: Short Lane Gun Adapters
- Type: Limited liability company
- Industry: Firearms accessories
- Founded: February 23, 2012 in Miles City, Montana, U.S. (trading since 2009 as Short Lane Fabrication)
- Founder: Ray Banister
- Products: Chamber adapters for break-action shotguns
- Website: gunadapters.com

Short Lane, LLC is an American manufacturer of firearm accessories based in Miles City, Montana. The company produces chamber adapters that allow a break-action shotgun to fire smaller-gauge shotshells or handgun and rimfire cartridges. It sells its products online under the name Short Lane Gun Adapters.

== History ==
Short Lane, LLC was incorporated in Montana on February 23, 2012.

== Reception ==
American Shooting Journal tested Short Lane adapter sets, including the Stack-N-Pack kit and Pathfinder adapters, in an H&R Topper shotgun and described the products positively. Guns.com used Short Lane adapters in its 2025 review of the ATI Nomad shotgun, noting the adapters were "well-machined" steel, while also noting that steel adapters can damage extractor claws on ejector-equipped guns and that reloading with adapters is slow. AmmoLand covered the company's 20-gauge-to-9mm Pathfinder adapter in 2017.
