= Angela, Montana =

- Unincorporated community
- Location within Montana Location within the United States
- Coordinates: 46°43′48″N 106°12′04″W
- Country: United States
- State: Montana
- County: Rosebud
- Elevation: 2,923 ft (891 m)

Population (2010)
  - Total: 31
- Time zone: UTC-7 (Mountain (MST))
  - Summer (DST): UTC-6 (MDT)
- ZIP code: 59312
- Area code: 406
- GNIS feature ID: 768262

Angela is an unincorporated community in Rosebud County, Montana, United States. It is located 25 miles (40 km) northwest of Miles City, along Montana Highway 59 at an elevation of 2923 feet (891 m). Angela is inside area code 406 and has a post office with ZIP code 59312. The population of the community was 31 at the 2010 United States census.

The post office was established in 1913. The postmaster and his wife also built a general store at this location. The store burned down in 1953 but was rebuilt by the surrounding area residents.

== Media ==
The Forsyth-based Independent Press covers news for all of Rosebud County, which includes Angela.
