= NBC 3 =

NBC 3 may refer to:

== United States ==
=== Current affiliates ===
- KCRA-TV, Sacramento, California
- KFDX-TV, Wichita Falls, Texas
- KIEM-TV, Eureka, California
- KSAN-TV, San Angelo, Texas
- KSNV, Las Vegas, Nevada
- KSNW, Wichita, Kansas
- KYTV (TV), Springfield, Missouri
- WAVE-TV, Louisville, Kentucky
- WEAR-DT2, a digital subchannel of WEAR-TV in Pensacola, Florida / Mobile, Alabama
- WKYC, Cleveland, Ohio
- WLBT, Jackson, Mississippi
- WRCB, Chattanooga, Tennessee
- WSAV-TV, Savannah, Georgia
- WSAZ-TV, Huntington–Charleston, West Virginia
- WSTM-TV, Syracuse, New York
- WSVW-LD, Harrisonburg, Virginia (broadcasts on channel 30; branded as NBC 3 in the Valley)
  - Simulcasted on WHSV-TV channel 3.2

=== Formerly affiliated ===
- KMTV-TV, Omaha, Nebraska (1956–1986)
- KNTV, San Francisco–Oakland–San Jose, California (formerly branded by its cable channel number as NBC 3 in 2002)
- KRTV, Great Falls, Montana (1960–1986)
- KYUS-TV, Miles City, Montana (1970–2024)
- KYW-TV, Philadelphia, Pennsylvania (1941–1995)
- WJMN-TV, Escanaba, Michigan (1969–1983)
- WTAR-TV (now WTKR), Norfolk, Virginia (1952–1953)
- WTMJ-TV, Milwaukee, Wisconsin (was on channel 3 from 1947 to 1953)

== Japan ==
- Nagasaki Broadcasting (JOUR-DTV), Nagasaki, Nagasaki Prefecture, Japan (affiliated with Japan News Network)
