= KUHM =

KUHM may refer to:

- KUHM (FM), a radio station (91.7 FM) licensed to serve Helena, Montana, United States
- KUHM-TV, a television station (channel 29/PSIP 10) licensed to serve Helena, Montana, United States
