= KJDN =

KJDN may refer to:

- KJDN-LD, a low-power television station (channel 6, virtual 39) licensed to serve Logan, Utah, United States; see List of television stations in Utah
- Jordan Airport (ICAO code KJDN)
