= Jordan Airport =

- IATA: JDN; ICAO: KJDN; FAA LID: JDN

Summary
- Airport type: Public
- Owner: Garfield County
- Serves: Jordan, Montana
- Elevation AMSL: 2,662 ft (811 m)
- Coordinates: 47°19′44″N 106°57′10″W
- Interactive map of Jordan Airport

Runways
Direction	Length		Surface
Direction	ft	m	Surface
11/29	4,300	1,311	Asphalt

Statistics (2008)
- Aircraft operations: 2,050
- Source: Federal Aviation Administration

Jordan Airport (IATA: JDN, ICAO: KJDN, FAA LID: JDN) is a county-owned, public-use airport located two nautical miles (4 km) northwest of the central business district of Jordan, a town in Garfield County, Montana, United States. It is included in the National Plan of Integrated Airport Systems for 2011–2015, which categorized it as a general aviation airport.

== Facilities and aircraft ==
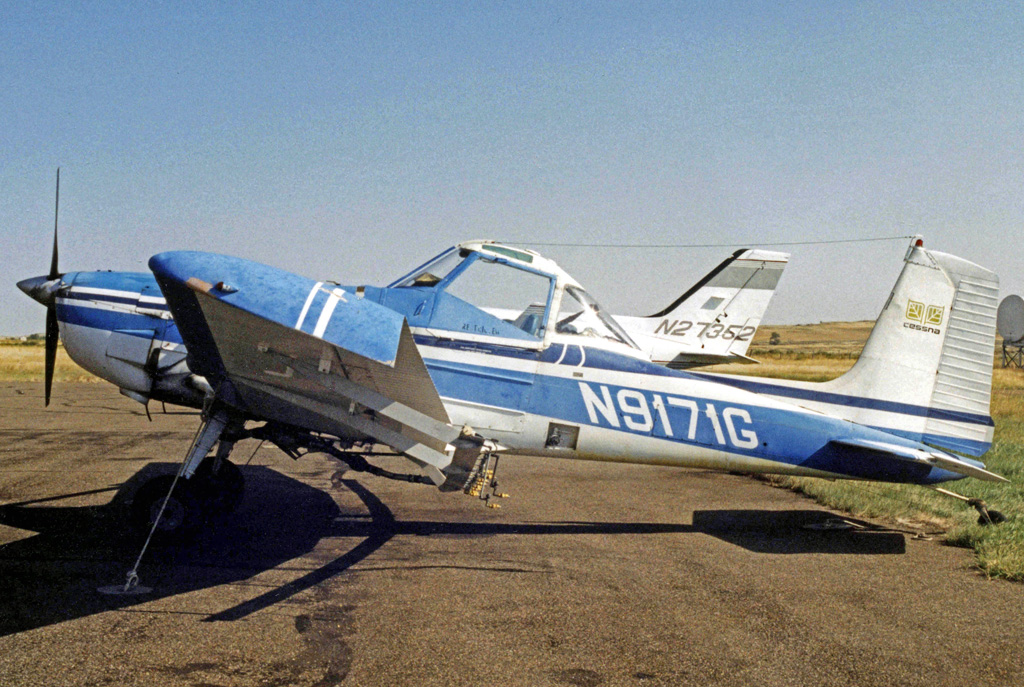
Agricultural and business aircraft at Jordan Airport

Jordan Airport covers an area of 234 acres (95 ha) at an elevation of 2,662 feet (811 m) above mean sea level. It has one runway designated 11/29 with an asphalt surface measuring 4,300 by 75 feet (1,311 x 23 m).

For the 12-month period ending August 6, 2008, the airport had 2,050 general aviation aircraft operations, an average of 170 per month.

== See also ==
- List of airports in Montana
