= Cayuse horse =

Term for a small horse

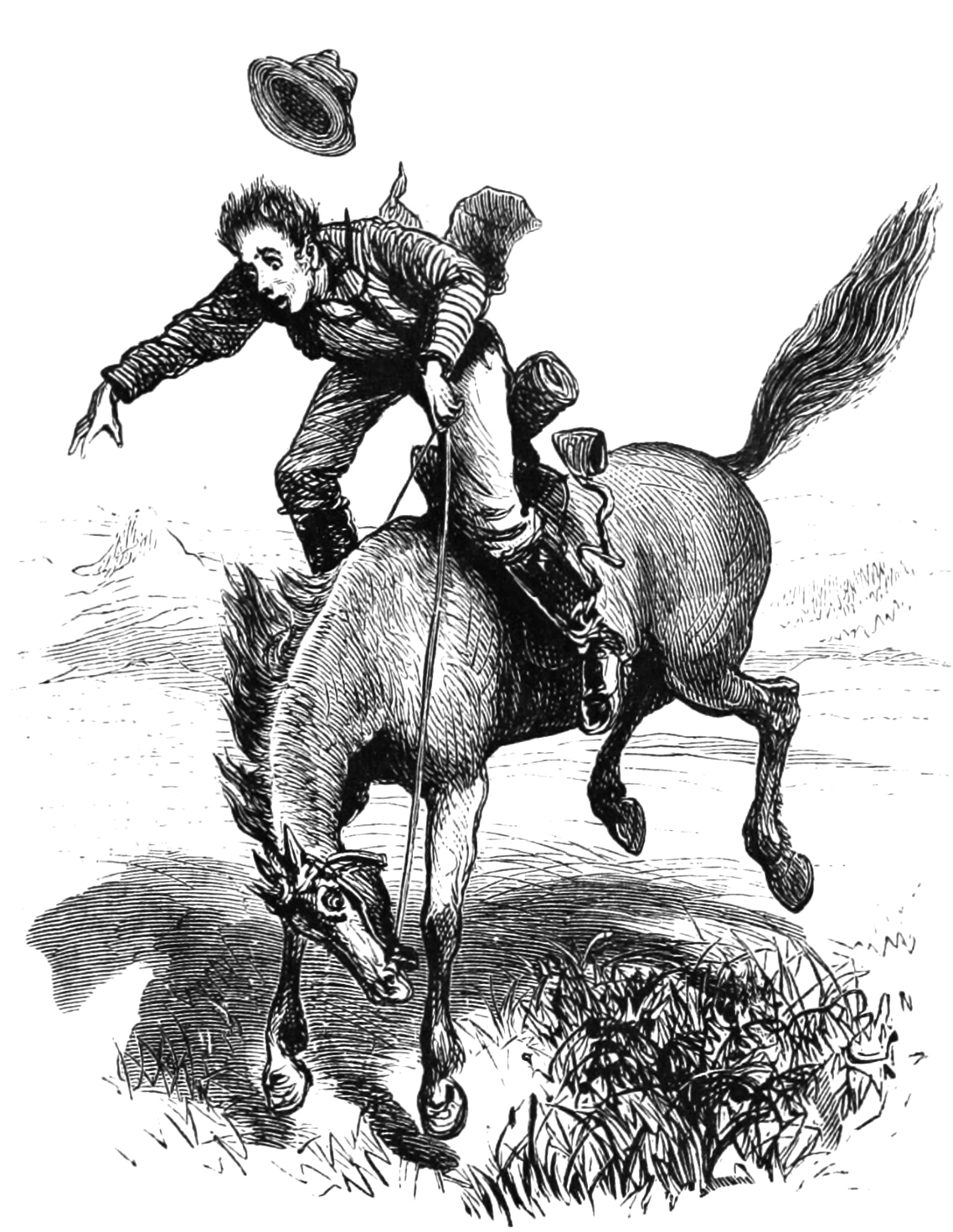
A 1873 engraving from Scribner's Monthly encaptioned "A bucking cayuse"

Cayuse is an archaic term used in the American West, originally referring to a small landrace horse, often noted for unruly temperament. The name came from the horses of the Cayuse people of the Pacific Northwest. The term came to be used in a derogatory fashion to refer to any small, low-quality horse, particularly if owned by indigenous people or a feral horse.

Later the term was applied to people of villainous reputation.

In British Columbia, the variant word cayoosh refers to a particular breed of powerful small horse admired for its endurance. Qayus (Cayuse) is the Tŝilhqot’in term for the wild horses in that Province’s Chilcotin region, used by the local Tŝilhqot’in Nation.

One theory of the origin of the word “Cayuse” is that it derives from the French "cailloux," meaning stones or rocks. The name may have referred to the rocky area the Cayuse people inhabited or it may have been an imprecise rendering of the name they called themselves. Another is that it is a Native American adaptation of the Spanish caballo, with the -s ending a noun form in Salishan languages. A variant adaptation, kiuatan, with a Sahaptian -tan ending, is the main word for "horse" or "pony" in the Chinook Jargon, although cayuse or cayoosh was also used in some areas.

"The little ponies, which take their name from the Cayuse Indians, possess as a native quality, this habit of bucking, or jumping high in the air as we have lambs do, striking with every joint stiffened, all four feet forcibly upon the earth. The concussion is so violent that, unless the rider is experienced, one or two efforts will be enough to dash him to the ground. The very appearance of the animal is frightful. The ears are thrown back close to its head, the eyes put on a vicious expression, it froths at the mouth, seizes the bit with its teeth, tries to bite, and every possible manner evinces the utmost enmity for its rider. Bucking is deemed as incurable as balking — whip and spur and kind treatment being alike in vain."
The Ascent of Mt. Hayden, Scribner's Monthly, June 1873

“Cayuse” used in cowboy jargon as a derogatory term for a person of low character or little value appeared in the 1925 silent film Tumbleweeds directed by King Baggot, where the cowboy hero played by William S. Hart calls the villain a "cayuse" in the title cards.

== In popular culture ==
Horses identified as “cayuses” in literature include Nimpo and Stuyve, who were depicted in Richmond P. Hobson, Jr.'s book Grass Beyond The Mountains. Both horses had been captured by a local Native American named Thomas Squinas near Nimpo Lake in the Chilcotin District of British Columbia. Hobson described the two cayuses as the best horses that he owned, because of their unrelenting spirit and hardiness that helped them survive the extreme conditions in northern British Columbia. There is also an example in John Steinbeck's book, The Red Pony.

In "Don't Fence Me In", a popular American song written in 1934 by Cole Porter and Robert Fletcher, is the line "On my Cayuse, let me wander over yonder...'. It was recorded by Roy Rogers, Gene Autry, Bing Crosby, Ella Fitzgerald, Clint Eastwood, Willie Nelson and Leon Russell, among many others.

Some versions of "The Strawberry Roan", a classic Western poem and later song, describe the titular horse as a Cayuse.

The 1953 film Tumbleweed features a horse with that name, whose quirky personality, sure-footedness, and relationship with the human protagonist (Jim Harvey, played by Audie Murphy) help to drive the plot. Harvey refers to Tumbleweed several times as a "Cayuse" in a derogatory way, but over the course of the film Tumbleweed proves to be a much better horse than his lowly appearance at first suggested.

The television station KYUS in Miles City, MT, derives its call letters from the word "cayuse", in reference to the strong rodeo tradition of the community and its Miles City Bucking Horse Sale.
