= Bitterroot Valley Public Television =

Public television station in Montana, US

Bitterroot Valley Public Television (BVTV) was a low-power public television station serving southwestern Montana's Bitterroot Valley. Operating through K21AN in Darby and two translators, it aired programming from PBS, obtained through the Rural Television System, as well as some locally originating programming.

== History ==
In February 1984, Bitterroot Valley Public Television Inc. incorporated and applied to the National Telecommunications and Information Administration for federal funding to build a low-power public TV station to serve the Bitterroot Valley, including Darby, Grantsdale, Corvallis, and Victor. Backers of the proposal had been doing local origination programming on a local cable system. By 1985, the group had a construction permit for channel 21 at Darby and planned a studio in Hamilton. Local staffing was minimized by the association with the Rural Television System, a Nevada-based group.

In early 1988, most of the grant money was released to the group, allowing for the purchase of the final equipment necessary to start BVTV from a studio at Corvallis. The site at the local electric cooperative also contained a satellite dish to downlink PBS signals. Construction was complete by the end of July, and BVTV was broadcasting from channel 21 by the next month. It formed part of a new wave of rural Montana stations alongside SKC TV at Salish Kootenai College. In 1989, the station began airing regular local programming on Saturday nights, including a public affairs show and a program of student broadcasts from four local high schools.

The Darby transmitter served the southern half of the Bitterroot Valley. On December 24, 1989, the Corvallis transmitter opened on channel 67, increasing the station's potential audience from 7,000 to 20,000 people. At the time, BVTV's operating costs increased while the station was already in debt. The third transmitter, channel 29 in Florence, opened in 1994, providing coverage to communities such as Eagle Watch, Burnt Fork, and parts of Stevensville. The expansion to Florence included a studio allowing the high school there to originate programming for BVTV.

In the mid-1990s, the electric cooperative expanded into the former studio space, limiting BVTV's ability to do live broadcasts or fundraising. At the same time, the incipient Montana PBS network expanded into the region with the launch of KUFM-TV at Missoula. KUFM-TV, with its higher-power VHF signal, posed a threat to the viability of the lower-power Bitterroot station. BVTV was not broadcast on the local cable system, which offered KUFM-TV and KSPS-TV in Spokane, Washington. This limited its potential audience and donor base.

BVTV never converted to digital. The channel 67 transmitter, K67EC, was deleted at the end of 2011, having never submitted an application to move when channel 67 was removed from television use. Channels 21 and 29, K21AN and K29DA, failed to file renewals of their broadcast licenses in 2014 and were thus deleted.
