= Robert Fletcher (poet) =

American poet

- Born: March 13, 1885; Clear Lake, Iowa, United States
- Died: November 20, 1972 (aged 87); Escondido, California, United States

Robert H. Fletcher was the initially uncredited co-lyricist of Cole Porter's "Don't Fence Me In."

Fletcher was born March 13, 1885, in Clear Lake, Iowa, to Henry Clay and Delia Ann (née Camp) Fletcher. After graduating with a degree in mining engineering, he moved to Montana where he found work in mining camps and as a surveyor. In 1914, prior to serving in World War I, he married Virginia Toole Kennett. He moved to Helena, Montana, in 1923 to work for the Montana Highway Department to promote tourism in Montana. Around 1935, he was instrumental in the creation of ports of entry at major highways entering Montana, where visitors were provided with information about Montana's history and points of interest.

Fletcher became a student of Montana history and wrote the text for a series of historical markers displayed throughout Montana in the mid-1930s. Several compilations of those markers have been published. In the 1950s he was commissioned by the Montana Cattlemen's Association to write a history of the cattle industry in Montana titled "Free Grass to Fences."

An early "cowboy poet", Fletcher published a book of verse titled "Corral Dust." Cole Porter purchased one of Fletcher's poems for $250, which later became "Don't Fence Me In," intended for a movie that was not made. Several years later, Porter's revision of the song, especially the version sung by Kate Smith, became popular nationwide. Fletcher eventually negotiated with Porter's estate to receive co-writing credit and a share of the royalties from the song.

Fletcher left his position with the State of Montana and moved to Butte to work in public relations with the Montana Power Company, where he worked until his retirement. He eventually moved to Rancho Bernardo, California, where he died on November 20, 1972.
