= KUHM-TV =

Television station in Helena, Montana

- Helena, Montana; United States
- Channels: Digital: 29 (UHF); Virtual: 10

Programming
- Network: Montana PBS
- Affiliations: 10.1: PBS; for others, see § Subchannels

Ownership
- Owner: Montana State University

History
- Founded: July 23, 1996
- First air date: August 15, 1998
- Former call signs: KAQR (1996–1997); KBCC (1997–1998); KMTF (1998–2015)
- Former channel numbers: Analog: 10 (VHF, 1998–2009)
- Former affiliations: Fox (1998–2001); UPN (secondary, 1998–2001); Pax TV (2001–2005); The WB (2005–2006); The CW (2006–2015)
- Call sign meaning: UHF Helena, Montana

Technical information
- Licensing authority: FCC
- Facility ID: 68717
- ERP: 43.4 kW
- HAAT: 697 m (2,287 ft)
- Transmitter coordinates: 46°49′29.4″N 111°42′15.6″W
- Translator(s): K11WM-D Townsend

Links
- Public license information: Public file; LMS

KUHM-TV (channel 10) is a PBS member television station in Helena, Montana, United States. Owned by Montana State University (MSU), it is operated as part of the Montana PBS state network, a joint venture with the University of Montana (UM). KUHM-TV's transmitter is located on Hogback Mountain; master control and internal operations are based at the network's headquarters in the Visual Communications Building on the MSU campus in Bozeman.

== History ==
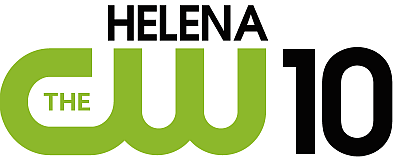
KMTF's logo as a CW affiliate, used from September 18, 2006, through July 2, 2015.

The station was originally granted its construction permit on July 23, 1996; on September 16, it was assigned the call letters KAQR. On October 1, 1997, the station changed its call letters to KBCC; on March 27, 1998, channel 10 took on the KMTF call sign. On August 15, 1998, the station started broadcasting as the local Fox affiliate; KMTF also had a secondary affiliation with UPN. On July 1, 2001, due to low ratings and revenue, the station dropped the Fox affiliation and became an affiliate of Pax TV; area cable systems quickly added Foxnet to their lineups to continue carrying Fox programming. After KMTF's affiliation agreement with Pax TV expired in July 2005, the station switched to The WB; the switch made Helena the eighth market in which The WB 100+ Station Group (a predominantly cable-only service that brought WB programming to smaller markets) was seen on an over-the-air station. In September 2006, KMTF became the affiliate for The CW and become part of The CW Plus, the successor of The WB 100+ Station Group.

For most of its time as a commercial station, KMTF was owned by Rocky Mountain Broadcasting Company, which was 51% owned by Uhlmann/Latshaw Broadcasting (itself jointly owned by The Uhlmann Company and Latshaw Enterprises until early 2014, when Uhlmann bought Latshaw's stake) and 49% owned by Meridian Communications; a $60,000 purchase of Uhlmann/Latshaw's stake by Meridian, proposed in 2006, was dismissed by the Federal Communications Commission (FCC) on November 4, 2014. From October 13, 1999, until August 15, 2005, Sunbelt Communications Company (later known as Intermountain West Communications Company (IWCC)), owner of NBC affiliate KTVH (channel 12), programmed KMTF under a time brokerage agreement; the agreement had been assigned to Sunbelt by Meridian, who had operated KMTF since its 1998 launch. Concurrent with the termination of the time brokerage agreement, Sunbelt entered into a joint sales agreement with Rocky Mountain, supplemented on August 30 with a shared services agreement. Through Meridian, KMTF's ownership included the daughter of IWCC's owner and founder. The arrangement was set up in such a way so as to circumvent FCC rules regarding ownership of competing stations by the same entity. However, as the original time brokerage agreement was made after November 5, 1996, it was not grandfathered after the FCC began to consider such agreements in excess of 15% to be attributable, and was thus required to be unwound by August 6, 2001; on October 9, 2014, IWCC agreed to contribute $40,000 to the United States Treasury to settle the FCC's investigation into the time brokerage agreement.

On May 7, 2014, Intermountain West Communications Company announced that it would sell KTVH-DT to Gray Television. As part of the deal, Gray concurrently acquired KMTF outright through a failing station waiver. The sale was completed on December 1.

On July 1, 2015, Gray announced that it would sell KTVH to Cordillera Communications, which owns CBS affiliate KXLH-LD (channel 9). KMTF was concurrently donated to Montana State University for integration into the Montana PBS system. The following day, KMTF dropped its CW affiliation and went dark; CW programming later aired on the second subchannel of KTVH from 2015 to 2023. Montana State University changed the station's call letters to KUHM-TV on September 1, 2015, after the donation was completed. KUHM-TV provides more-reliable reception in areas around Helena unable to receive K49EH-D channel 49, which provided Montana PBS programming to Helena before KMTF's conversion to KUHM-TV.

== Subchannels ==
The station's signal is multiplexed:

Subchannels of KUHM-TV
Subchannel	Res.	Short name	Programming
10.1	1080i	KUHM-HD	PBS
10.2	480i	KUHM-K	PBS Kids (4:3)
10.3	480i	KUHM-CR	Create (4:3)
10.4	480i	KUHM-W	World (4:3)
10.5	480i	KUHM-L	TVMT simulcast (4:3)
