= William Harmon House (Miles City, Montana) =

Historic house in Montana, United States

- U.S. National Register of Historic Places
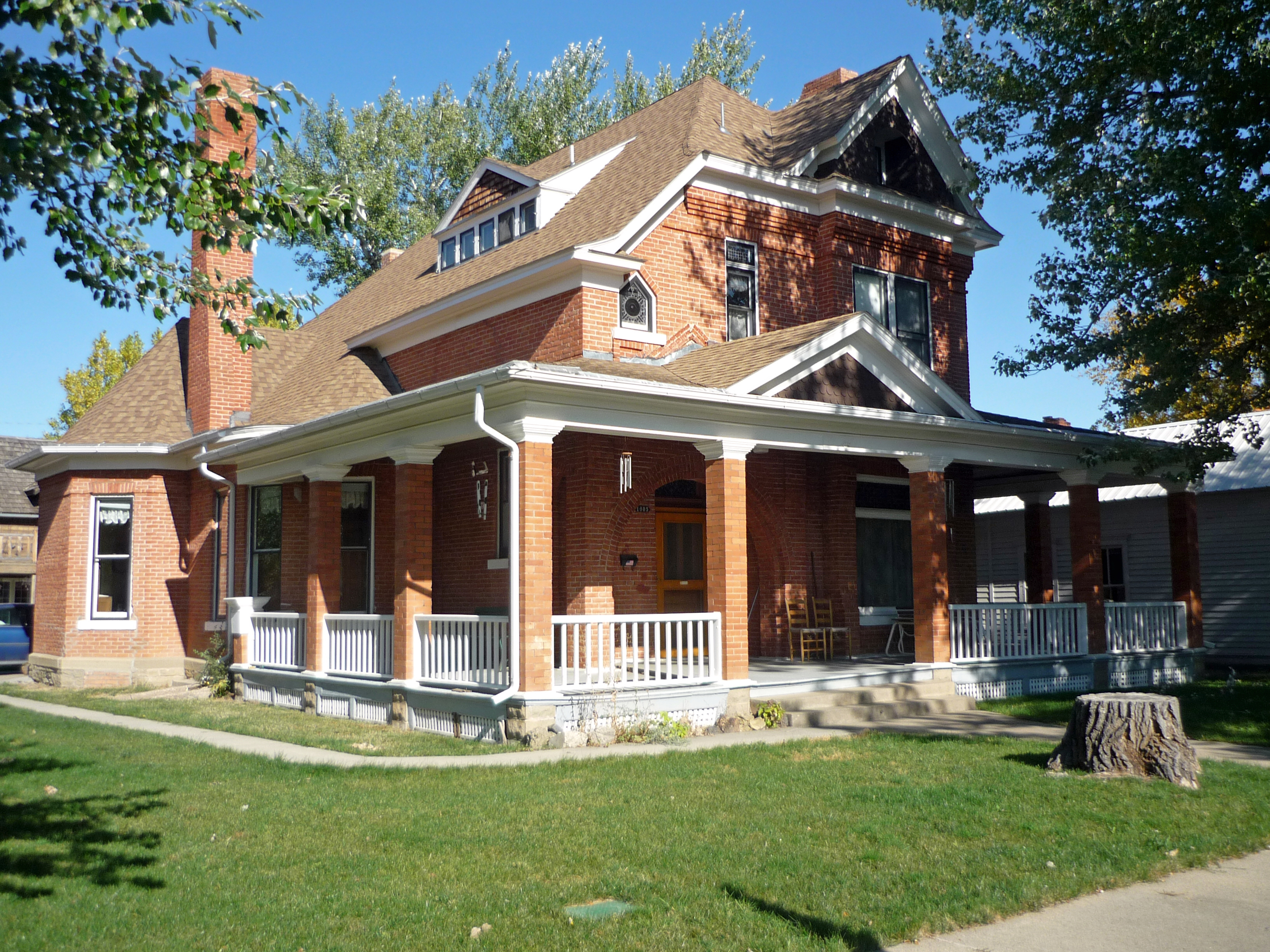

- Location within Montana Location within the United States
- Location: 1005 Palmer
- Coordinates: 46°24′36″N 105°50′48″W
- Area: less than one acre
- Built: 1887, 1903-1910
- Architectural style: Victorian: Queen Anne
- NRHP reference No.: 86002747
- Added to NRHP: September 25, 1986

The William Harmon House, also known as Rivenes House, is a National Registered Historic Place located in Miles City, Montana, United States. It was added to the Register on September 25, 1986, and served as the first mayoral residence of Miles City.

It is a two-and-a-half-story brick house built on a sandstone foundation. It originally, in 1887, had an elaborate porch leading to the entrance in the southwest corner of the house. It was modified during 1903–1910 to add a wraparound porch.
