= KMTA =

- Miles City, Montana; United States
- Frequency: 1050 kHz
- Branding: KMTA 1050 AM 95.3 FM

Programming
- Format: Oldies

Ownership
- Owner: P&A Media LLC
- Sister stations: KYUS-FM

History
- First air date: 1986
- Former call signs: KCCA

Technical information
- Licensing authority: FCC
- Facility ID: 42379
- Class: D
- Power: 10,000 watts day; 136 watts night
- Transmitter coordinates: 46°24′4″N 105°39′8″W
- Translator: 95.3 K237DW (Miles City)

Links
- Public license information: Public file; LMS
- Webcast: Listen Live
- Website: KMTA Online

KMTA (1050 AM) is a radio station licensed to serve Miles City, Montana. The station is owned by P&A Media LLC. It airs an oldies format.

== History ==
The station was assigned the KMTA call letters by the Federal Communications Commission (FCC) on September 23, 1986.

In 2006, Stephen A. Marks' Custer County Community Broadcasting Corporation purchased KMTA and KKRY (92.3 FM) from Senger Broadcasting Corporation for $540,000. Marks already owned KYUS-TV (channel 3) in Miles City; as the television station was a satellite of KULR-TV in Billings, it did not count against the FCC's cross-ownership rules.

Stephen Marks died on May 11, 2022. Andrew Sturlaugson's P&A Media acquired Marks' Montana and North Dakota radio stations, including KMTA and KYUS-FM (the former KKRY), for $850,000 in 2024; the sale separated the radio stations from KYUS-TV, which the Marks estate retained until 2025.
