= Montana PBS =

PBS member network in Montana

- Montana; United States

Programming
- Subchannels: see § Subchannels
- Affiliations: PBS

Ownership
- Owner: Montana State University; University of Montana
- Sister stations: Montana Public Radio, through UM

History
- First air date: October 1, 1984

Links
- Website: www.montanapbs.org
- For technical information, see § Stations.

Montana PBS is the PBS member public television network for the U.S. state of Montana. It is a joint venture between Montana State University (MSU) and the University of Montana (UM). The network is headquartered in the Visual Communications Building on the MSU campus on West Grant Street in Bozeman, with a separate studio inside the Performing Arts and Radio/TV (PARTV) Center on the UM campus on Campus Drive in Missoula.

Educational television in Montana had a long and tortuous history, with scattered efforts. The first educational stations available to Montanans were KSPS-TV from Spokane, Washington, on translators and cable systems west of the Continental Divide beginning in 1970 and KUED from Salt Lake City, Utah, on cable systems in central and eastern Montana as early as 1961. Montana came close to establishing a statewide network in the mid-1970s, when it authorized the Montana Educational Broadcasting Commission and obtained a permit for a TV transmitter at Butte. The plan collapsed amid political controversy over a lease for the network's studio in Bozeman and a power play to defund the commission in order to fund a library at Montana Technological University.

Spurred by a group seeking to begin over-the-air broadcasting of PBS's children's programs, and already home to a visual communications building and television studio, MSU put KUSM-TV into service on October 1, 1984. Montana became the last state with its own PBS station. Originally a semi-satellite of KUED with specific Montana programs, between 1988 and 1991 KUSM replaced KUED on all Montana cable systems. The University of Montana joined the system in October 1996 with the launch of KUFM-TV in Missoula. Today, the Montana PBS network comprises eight full-power stations and a large network of translators that rebroadcast its signal throughout the state.

Montana PBS has two general managers—one for KUSM-TV and one for KUFM-TV—and programming originates from both universities. Local series include the music program 11th and Grant, an MSU production from Bozeman, and Backroads of Montana, a UM production. Operations are funded by donations through Friends of Montana PBS, support from the universities, and contract production.

== Educational television in Montana: Preamble ==
Early activity around educational or public television in Montana was sporadic and disconnected. Beginning in 1957, the College of Great Falls produced programming seen over commercial stations KRTV and KFBB-TV in Great Falls. In February 1962, educational television came to Missoula when Montana State University in Missoula—now the University of Montana (UM)—began providing closed-circuit courses in Spanish to Missoula junior high school students. Schools in Kalispell and Miles City also were serviced by educational television programming. In 1964, Montana State College in Bozeman—now Montana State University (MSU)—began originating lectures in zoology received by hospitals at Great Falls and Billings, by microwave link. It had an outside broadcasting van for telecasts from remote sites.

Beginning in 1962 with Great Falls, cable television systems began providing KUED from Salt Lake City to subscribers. By 1969, 25 percent of Montana households had access to KUED. The first educational television transmitter in Montana opened in 1970, when Flathead Valley Community College built a translator to bring the programming of KSPS-TV in Spokane, Washington, to Kalispell. In 1971, four Montana stations—KFBB-TV in Great Falls, KXGN-TV in Glendive, KOOK-TV in Billings, and KGVO-TV in Missoula—agreed to add the educational show Sesame Street to their schedules.

The Federal Communications Commission (FCC) reserved six television channels in Montana for educational use. In 1960, Montana Superintendent of Public Instruction Harriet Miller convened a committee on educational television. That year, then–Montana State University was gifted a television antenna by the owner of Kalispell radio station KOFI, but it had no plans to build a station on Missoula's reserved channel 11. The committee's report, released in 1962, endorsed an educational television transmitter network to cover 80 percent of the population. The proposal foresaw a three-stage plan, starting with transmitters at Missoula and at Bozeman, home to Montana State College—now Montana State University (MSU)—plus a microwave between the two cities. A second wave would encompass transmitters at Helena, Billings, Butte, and Great Falls, and a third wave at Kalispell, Miles City, and Havre, plus a Helena studio.

However, Montana lagged every other state in planning for educational television. In 1967, a member of MSU's film and television department told a gathering of school administrators that the state sorely needed a unified plan but could avoid the pitfalls of other states. An article on the front page of the Great Falls Tribune declared, "Lacking executive and legislative interest and support in the past, the future of Montana ETV would appear bleak." The culprit, according to Miller and Fred L. Gerber of MSU, was a lack of interest in state funding to unlock federal matching grants to fund the service. The 1969 Montana legislature allowed schools to pool funds to purchase instructional programming, but there was dissent over whether to conduct pilots of educational programming in classrooms or move right into usage.

=== 1970s Butte plan ===
In 1971, state senator William Bertsche introduced a bill providing for an educational television system, and superintendent Dolores Colburg released a study finding that such a system would cost millions of dollars, primarily in acquiring TV sets for schools. That year, the legislature named Colburg coordinator of educational television. Colburg convened a new advisory council on the matter in 1972 and applied for federal grant money in 1973. The first facility proposed to be put in use was channel 7 at Butte, to broadcast from XL Heights. The site had been offered by Joe Sample, owner of the Montana Television Network. Interests in Helena suggested locating the transmitter on Hogback Mountain to reach Helena and Great Falls, though Helena's educational channel assignment was in the UHF band. Legislators authorized the creation of the Montana Educational Broadcasting Commission to operate the prospective educational television service. The commission projected to be on the air by January 1976 in time for the United States Bicentennial. It selected the Butte transmitter site and Montana State University, with its pre-existing facilities, as the studio. The plan was to convert a former kitchen and cold storage in MSU's Hapner Hall for use by the station, which was granted the call sign KMPT.

In February 1975, the Montana House of Representatives convened a special committee into the leasing arrangements for a building in Bozeman to serve as the educational television group's headquarters. The arrangements resulted in a payment to Herb Pace, a Bozeman businessman and member of the committee, that was questioned as self-dealing. Days later, Pace resigned from the board. More pressing was a reluctance by the legislature to approve additional money needed to put KMPT into service. The commission had sought $1 million a year; a legislative subcommittee recommended $420,000, an action that executive director Kenneth Clark called "ripp[ing] the heart out of Montana ETV". The Montana legislature seesawed between defunding the program and funding it at a reduced level. In the end, the commission received $154,000—enough money to cease operations—and wound up its affairs in May. The Associated Press attributed its death to vote-trading for other priorities:

...As the legislature ended, the boys from Butte put together a political play that gained Montana Tech a new library, Helena a liquor warehouse and had the side effect of leaving educational television dying on the vine.

The lease controversy resulted in criminal charges against Pace, which were dismissed. Additionally, the property owner obtained a judgment against the state for breaking its lease.

After the Montana Educational Broadcasting Commission disbanded, a non-profit group called the Corporation for Montana Public Television was formed by the commission's former president with an aim to obtaining the federal grant money the state had already received for the KMPT project. They proposed to start from Butte and carry out the plans originally prepared by the commission, rebroadcasting KUED plus minimal local programming. To qualify to have the grant transferred, the legislature needed to recognize the corporation as the commission's successor. The state failed to appropriate the necessary funds, causing the grant to be lost. The state sold the equipment it had acquired, including a channel 7 transmitter and antenna, as surplus. Montana was now left along with Wyoming as one of two states without its own public TV station. The transmitter was bought as a backup for KIRO-TV in Seattle. Channel 7 was reallocated out of Butte to become the first commercial station allocation for Bozeman in 1980. Wyoming became the 49th state with its own public TV station—and Montana the only state without one—when KCWC-TV began in 1983.

== History ==
=== Establishment of KUSM ===
In 1982, Montana State University applied for a low-power TV station license in Bozeman. Because of conflicts with other applications, the university refiled on August 25, 1983, seeking the reserved channel 9. The station was proposed to be broadcast from atop the Hedges South dormitory on the MSU campus. MSU already had a new visual communications building and a commitment for technical support from the Montana Television Network. By year's end, the FCC had granted the university a construction permit for channel 9. The MSU effort coincided with organization by Montanans for Children's Television, a group formed by Nancy Flikkema with the aim of bringing PBS's children's programs to non-cable households.

With a power of 100 watts and a transmitter donated by Sample, KUSM-TV began broadcasting on October 1, 1984. It offered KUED's PBS programming—but not programs KUED bought from outside distributors—plus 15 hours a week of Montana-specific programming. Because of the inability to air all KUED programming, MSU agreed to let KUED remain on cable. The university disavowed any attempt to become a statewide network, in part because of the controversy of the 1970s. In addition to the Montana Television Network's support, Westinghouse Broadcasting donated equipment from WJZ-TV in Baltimore, and a friends group, Friends of KUSM, was created to support local fundraising. While KUED was still seen on cable, KUSM local programming was offered on the feed, such as the public affairs show Capitol Journal. KUSM was also able to purchase some programming on its own, such as the MacNeil–Lehrer NewsHour, which KUED had dropped from its schedule in 1983. The station incurred a $79,000 debt in its first two years on the air, much of which was wiped out by an anonymous donation in 1987.

KUSM received its first direct Community Service Grant from the Corporation for Public Broadcasting in 1987, enabling it to become an independent PBS member in its own right. In 1988, KUSM and KUED began a three-year program to transition all remaining PBS viewership and donations for KUED in central and eastern Montana to KUSM. The transition began on July 1 of that year, when KUSM-TV began originating its daytime program feed. The next year, prime time programming began to originate from Bozeman. The transition was completed in 1991.

=== KUFM-TV: Into the Flathead ===
KSPS wants to keep its western Montana viewers, UM wants a public TV station and MSU's KUSM wants the financial help that western Montana viewers could bring.

— Don Habbe, provost, University of Montana

Even though KUED-via-KUSM was available in central and eastern Montana, it was blocked from the western part of the state. In 1986, KUED-KUSM was removed from cable systems serving Missoula, Kalispell, and Hamilton and replaced with KSPS-TV, which did not have the same facilities to offer Montana programming. KSPS wanted to keep serving the area because it had invested considerably in microwave links to extend its signal to western Montana. KUSM, which lost money in fiscal years 1989 and 1990, was interested in expanding to western Montana to broaden its support base. However, the University of Montana was also interested in starting its own station. Though MSU supported a station being built at UM, it objected to UM's plan to operate as a semi-satellite of KSPS-TV, which would provide support. In a reversal of its previous refusal to expand statewide, MSU now argued that the two Montana stations made more sense linked rather than continuing the Spokane–Montana divide. The Montana Board of Regents ordered the parties to work out their differences. A third source of public programming—the low-power Bitterroot Valley Public Television (BVTV)—was also interested in adding Missoula to its coverage area. KUSM general manager Jack Hyyppa was retrospectively credited with convincing the regents to ensure that Montana had one statewide public TV broadcaster.

To make KUFM-TV a reality, the state appropriated funds for KUSM's operating costs and for completion of a Missoula–Bozeman microwave link and installation of a channel 11 transmitter. UM also received a $1.2 million federal grant. The establishment of a second full-line public TV station in Montana attracted opposition from conservatives. James Vidal believed the plan was a waste of taxpayer dollars when KSPS-TV did not cost anything to Montanans. The plan languished until February 1995, when KUFM-TV was approved with a reduced technical facility at the petition of BVTV, which feared losing its rights to PBS programming. As a result, the station's transmitter was relocated from TV Mountain to Dean Stone Mountain and the effective radiated power reduced. KUFM-TV began broadcasting in late October 1996; with its studio on the UM campus, the university assumed responsibility for news and public affairs programming for the combined service, known as Montana Public Television. The friends group was successively renamed Friends of Montana Public Television/KUSM in 1993, Friends of Montana Public Television in 1997, and Friends of Montana PBS in 1999.

Founding KUSM general manager Jack Hyyppa retired in 2006. After a brief tenure by James Baum, who left after four months, Jack's son Eric became the interim and later permanent general manager. His KUFM counterpart, William Marcus, retired in 2015.

=== Statewide transmitter expansion ===
In 1996, KUSM opened a translator in Helena, followed by Billings (2004) and Butte (2005). These areas, plus Livingston, were home to the network's only major translators in analog. Coinciding with the June 12, 2009, digital television transition, Montana PBS opened a full-power transmitter, KBGS-TV, in Billings. This was followed by two more in previously unserved areas: KUGF-TV Great Falls (October 21, 2010) and KUKL-TV Kalispell (2012). In 2015, as part of its acquisition of two full-power stations in Helena, Gray Television donated KMTF (channel 10), now KUHM-TV, to MSU for integration into the Montana PBS network.

MSU agreed to purchase KXGN-TV in Glendive and KYUS-TV in Miles City from The Marks Group on July 8, 2025, for $375,000, also for integration into Montana PBS; the remainder of the stations' value was credited as a donation. The sale was consummated on October 22, with both stations, along with KXGN's Sidney–Fairview translator K13IG-D, joining the Montana PBS network. (Note: Due to the federal government shutdown, the consummation paperwork was filed on November 24, 2025.) The addition of KXGN-TV and KYUS-TV brought over-the-air public television service to far eastern Montana for the first time; except for translators in the northeastern and southeastern parts of the state, Montana PBS did not previously have transmitters east of Billings.

In 2025, ground was broken on a 32,000-square-foot (3,000 m^{2}) expansion of the Visual Communications Building in Bozeman to include a television studio, production control rooms, and a 192-seat classroom and studio space to be named for Sample. The building is expected to be completed by 2027.

== Local programming ==
Montana PBS has several regular local programs. Eric Funk hosts 11th and Grant, a music program named for the location of the Bozeman studio which debuted in 2005. Backroads of Montana, a Montana travel journal, debuted in 1991—when it aired on the Montana Television Network. Montana PBS Reports: Impact is a series of public affairs documentaries, and Montana Ag Live is an agriculture program produced from Bozeman.

During college sports season, Montana PBS provides production facilities for MSU sports and employs dozens of MSU students.

== Governance and funding ==
KUFM-TV and KUSM-TV each have separate general managers. In fiscal year 2025, Montana PBS had total revenue of $8.1 million, of which $3.6 million came from donations to Friends of Montana PBS and $1.3 million. Another $1.6 million originated in grants from the Corporation for Public Broadcasting, whose federal funding was rescinded after 2025.

== Stations ==
Montana PBS is broadcast from eight full-service television station licenses, a network of translators, and free-to-air from the Galaxy 16 satellite at 99°W. The eight full-service television licenses comprising Montana PBS include:

Montana PBS full-service stations
Station	City of license	Channel; TV (RF)	FID	ERP	HAAT	Transmitter coordinates	First air date	Public license information
KBGS-TV	Billings	16 (16)	169030	29.8 kW	167.1 m (548 ft)	45°46′9.2″N 108°27′26.3″W	June 12, 2009	Public file; LMS
KUFM-TV	Missoula	11 (11)	66611	12.3 kW	633.8 m (2,079 ft)	46°48′9″N 113°58′21″W	October 1996	Public file; LMS
KUGF-TV	Great Falls	21 (21)	169028	23.4 kW	152.7 m (501 ft)	47°32′9.2″N 111°17′2.1″W	October 21, 2010 (Note: KUGF added the -TV suffix to its call sign on October 5, 2016.)	Public file; LMS
KUHM-TV	Helena	10 (29)	68717	43.4 kW	697 m (2,287 ft)	46°49′29.6″N 111°42′12.6″W	August 15, 1998 (Note: Joined Montana PBS on September 1, 2015. KUHM-TV used the call sign KAQR during its construction permit from September 16, 1996, to October 1, 1997, KBCC during its construction permit from October 1, 1997, to March 27, 1998, and KMTF from March 27, 1998, to September 1, 2015.)	Public file; LMS
KUKL-TV	Kalispell	46 (15)	169027	23.4 kW	830 m (2,723 ft)	48°0′48.2″N 114°21′54.5″W	2012	Public file; LMS
KUSM-TV	Bozeman	9 (8)	43567	17.9 kW	271 m (889 ft)	45°40′24″N 110°52′2″W	October 1, 1984 (Note: KUSM added the -TV suffix to its call sign on July 16, 2009.)	Public file; LMS
KXGN-TV	Glendive	5 (5)	24287	1 kW	152.4 m (500 ft)	47°2′39″N 104°40′54.4″W	November 1, 1957	Public file; LMS
KYUS-TV	Miles City	3 (3)	5237	2.9 kW	30 m (98 ft)	46°25′34″N 105°51′40″W	August 29, 1969	Public file; LMS

=== Translators ===
Montana PBS is rebroadcast over a network of low-power translator stations owned by MSU and translator associations, operating one of the largest translator networks in the state of Montana. In 2018, it acquired SKC TV, the public television station of Salish Kootenai College (consisting of five translators led by KSKC-CD (now K27MS-D)), and incorporated them into the network.

The following translators rebroadcast KBGS-TV:

- Billings: K20HB-D
- Bridger: K26NN-D

The following translators rebroadcast KUFM-TV:

- Arlee: K17NE-D
- Drummond: K22MI-D
- Ferndale: K33OH-D
- Heron: K13ZN-D
- Hot Springs: K29ND-D
- Pablo/Ronan: K27MS-D
- Philipsburg: K15KW-D
- Plains: K08OY-D
- Plains: K21CA-D
- Plains: K34PQ-D
- St. Ignatius: K33OR-D
- Thompson Falls: K23NP-D
- Townsend: K11WM-D

The following translators rebroadcast KUGF-TV:

- Big Sandy: K13OQ-D
- Loma: K29LD-D

The following translators rebroadcast KUKL-TV:

- Kalispell: K35PV-D
- West Glacier: K12LU-D

The following translators rebroadcast KUSM-TV:

- Belgrade, etc.: K17KB-D
- Boulder: K27CD-D
- Boulder: K36CX-D
- Butte: K24MP-D
- Chinook: K22LD-D
- Circle, etc.: K18CR-D
- Conrad: K16KB-D
- Ekalaka: K23DJ-D
- Emigrant: K27LO-D
- Fort Peck: K36OC-D
- Helena: K33OP-D
- Joplin: K35OF-D
- Plevna: K34DP-D

The following translators rebroadcast KXGN-TV:

- Baker: K27LT-D
- Circle: K16GP-D
- Culbertson: K34GY-D
- Ekalaka: K13LN-D
- Plentywood: K28OB-D
- Plevna: K03HD-D
- Poplar: K05KK-D, K17MS-D (Note: These stations are not co-sited. K17MS-D is a stacked translator with KUSM 9.1, ABC, Fox and SWX from KFBB-TV in Great Falls, NBC from KUMV-TV in Williston, North Dakota, and CBS from KRTV in Great Falls. It is the program source for the Scobey, Plentywood, and Circle translators.)
- Scobey: K13MA-D
- Sidney–Fairview: K13IG-D

=== Network map ===
- Montana PBS transmitters
- Full-power stations Low-power translators

== Technical information ==
=== Subchannels ===
The digital signals of Montana PBS's stations are multiplexed:

Montana PBS multiplex
Subchannel	Res.	Short name	Programming
xx.1	1080i	[callsign]-HD	PBS
xx.2	480i	[callsign]-K	PBS Kids
xx.3	480i	[callsign]-C	Create
xx.4	480i	[callsign]-W	World
xx.5	480i	[callsign]-L	MPAN

=== Analog-to-digital conversion ===
Montana PBS's two analog full-service stations—KUSM-TV and KUFM-TV—shut down their analog signals on June 12, 2009, the United States digital television transition date. The stations' digital channel allocations post-transition are as follows:

- KUSM-TV shut down its analog signal, over VHF channel 9; the station's digital signal remained on its pre-transition VHF channel 8, using virtual channel 9.
- KUFM-TV shut down its analog signal, over VHF channel 11; the station's digital signal relocated from its pre-transition UHF channel 27 to VHF channel 11.

The June 12, 2009, date did not include all translators. For instance, the Butte translator was converted in December 2009. The Helena translator remained in analog as late as 2011.
