= Don't Fence Me In (song) =

1934 American song by Robert Fletcher and Cole Porter

Song
- Written: 1934
- Published: 1944 by Harms Incorporated
- Composer: Cole Porter
- Lyricists: Robert Fletcher; Cole Porter

"Don't Fence Me In" is a popular American song written in 1934, with music by Cole Porter and lyrics by Robert Fletcher and Cole Porter. Members of the Western Writers of America chose it as one of the Top 100 Western songs of all time.

== Origins ==
Originally written in 1934 for Adios, Argentina, an unproduced 20th Century Fox film musical, "Don't Fence Me In" was based on text by Robert Fletcher, a poet and engineer with the Department of Highways in Helena, Montana. Cole Porter, who had been asked to write a cowboy song for the 20th Century Fox musical, bought the poem from Fletcher for $250. Porter reworked Fletcher's poem, and when the song was first published, Porter was credited with sole authorship. Porter had wanted to give Fletcher co-authorship credit, but his publishers did not allow it. The original copyright publication notice dated October 10, 1944, and the copyright card dated and filed on October 12, 1944, in the U.S. Copyright Office solely lists words and music by Cole Porter. After the song became popular, however, Fletcher hired attorneys who negotiated his co-authorship credit in subsequent publications. Although it was one of the most popular songs of its time, Porter claimed it was his least favorite of his compositions.

Porter's revision of the song retained quite a few portions of Fletcher's lyrics, such as "Give me land, lots of land", "... breeze ... cottonwood trees", "turn me loose, let me straddle my old saddle" "mountains rise ... western skies", "cayuse", "where the west commences", and "... hobbles ... can’t stand fences", but in some places modified them to give them “the smart Porter touch”. Porter replaced some lines, rearranged lyric phrases, and added two verses. (Porter's verses about Wildcat Kelly are not included in any of the hit recordings of the song but are used in the Roy Rogers film of the same title. Roy Rogers sang the first verse with the lyric "Wildcat Willy" when he performed it in 1944's Hollywood Canteen. Both verses are included in the Ella Fitzgerald and Harry Connick Jr. versions of the song.).

== Roy Rogers and "Don't Fence Me In" ==
Roy Rogers sang it in the 1944 Warner Bros. movie Hollywood Canteen. Many people heard the song for the first time when Kate Smith introduced it on her radio broadcast of October 8, 1944.

In 1945, the song was sung again as the title tune of another Roy Rogers film, Don't Fence Me In (1945), in which Dale Evans plays a magazine reporter who comes to Roy Rogers's and Gabby Whittaker's (George "Gabby" Hayes) ranch to research her story about a legendary late gunslinger. When it's revealed that Whittaker is actually the supposedly dead outlaw, Rogers must clear his name. Rogers and The Sons of the Pioneers perform songs, including the Cole Porter title tune.

The next year (1946), the Cole Porter biopic Night and Day used a clip from Hollywood Canteen of Rogers singing "Don't Fence Me In".

== Bing Crosby version ==
Bing Crosby and The Andrews Sisters with Vic Schoen and his Orchestra recorded it in 1944, without having previously seen or heard the song. Crosby entered the studio on July 25, 1944. Within 30 minutes, he and the Andrews Sisters had completed the recording, which sold more than a million copies and topped the Billboard charts for eight weeks in 1944–45. This version also went to number nine on the Harlem Hit Parade chart. This became the title song of a 1946 album.

== Frank Sinatra version ==
Frank Sinatra appeared on the Your Hit Parade program on December 23, 1944, and performed this song, which at the time was the #1 song in the country. The arrangement, written by both Lowell Martin (the first section of the arrangement) and Billy May (the second part including the shout chorus) was conducted by Axel Stordahl and the Lucky Strike Orchestra. Stordahl counted off the arrangement a little too fast, and Sinatra could not keep up with the fast pace of the lyrics. As a result, he stumbled on the words "underneath the western skies". Then, after the phrase "I want to ride to the ridge where the West commences", he uttered "too many words", most likely in an effort to explain his on-air slip-up. Shortly after his performance Sinatra was fired from the show, supposedly because of his on-air comment about the lyrics.

== Other notable versions ==
- Kate Smith had a top ten hit with the song in 1945.
- David Byrne had a critically acclaimed version of the song on the 1990 Cole Porter tribute album Red Hot + Blue.

== In popular culture ==
- 1961: Shortly after the Berlin Wall was erected in 1961, a Communist-run East Berlin radio station called Ops used “Don’t Fence Me In” as the theme song for its nightly broadcast aimed at Allied soldiers, based in West Berlin.
- 1980s: Bing Crosby's version was used in an advertisement for Centre Parcs UK, directed by Sharon Maguire. The advert was re-broadcast on ITV during the late 1990s.
- 2004: Song nominated by the American Film Institute (AFI) for inclusion in that organization's select list of "100 Years...100 Songs"
- In June 2026, CBS News included the song in its list of the 250 essential American songs of the past 250 years.
- Bob Dylan recorded a cover of the song that plays over the final scene and closing credits of the 2024 biographical film Reagan.

== See also ==
- List of number-one singles of 1944 and 1945 (U.S.)
