= KYUS-FM =

- Miles City, Montana; United States
- Broadcast area: Miles City, Montana
- Frequency: 92.3 MHz
- Branding: 92.3 KYUS FM

Programming
- Format: Adult hits
- Affiliations: United Stations Radio Networks

Ownership
- Owner: P&A Media LLC
- Sister stations: KMTA; KIKC; KIKC-FM

History
- First air date: November 30, 1984 (as KMCM-FM)
- Former call signs: KMCM-FM (1981–1997); KKRY (1997–2007)
- Call sign meaning: Cayuse, a type of Native American pony

Technical information
- Licensing authority: FCC
- Facility ID: 42380
- Class: C0
- ERP: 100,000 watts
- HAAT: 300 meters (980 ft)
- Transmitter coordinates: 46°24′4″N 105°39′8″W

Links
- Public license information: Public file; LMS
- Webcast: Listen live
- Website: fm.kyuskmta.com/kyus/

KYUS-FM (92.3 MHz, "92.3 KYUS FM") is a radio station licensed to serve Miles City, Montana. The station is owned by P&A Media LLC. It airs an adult hits music format.

== History ==
=== KMCM-FM ===
The station began broadcasting November 30, 1984, and originally held the call sign KMCM-FM. It was owned by William J. O'Brien. In 1986, the station was sold to Austin J. Baillon, along with AM 1050 KCCA, for $300,000. KMCM-FM aired an adult contemporary format. In 1997, the station was sold to Senger Broadcasting, along with AM 1050 KMTA, for $594,000.

=== KKRY ===
In October 1997, the station adopted a country music format and its call sign was changed to KKRY. The station was branded "Hot Country 92.5" (and later "Hot Country 92.3"). In 2005, the station's frequency was changed from 92.5 MHz to 92.3 MHz. In 2006, KKRY was sold to Stephen Marks's Custer County Community Broadcasting Corporation, along with AM 1050 KMTA, for $540,000. Marks already owned KYUS-TV (channel 3) in Miles City; as the television station was a satellite of KULR-TV in Billings, it did not count against the Federal Communications Commission's cross-ownership rules.

=== KYUS-FM ===
The station's call sign was changed to KYUS-FM on January 26, 2007. The station adopted an adult hits format. Following Stephen Marks's death in 2022, his Montana and North Dakota stations—including KYUS-FM and KMTA—were sold to Andrew Sturlaugson's P&A Media for $850,000 in 2024. The sale separated the radio stations from KYUS-TV, which the Marks estate retained until 2025.
