= KYUS-TV =

Television station in Miles City, Montana

- Miles City, Montana; United States
- Channels: Digital: 3 (VHF); Virtual: 3

Programming
- Network: Montana PBS
- Affiliations: 3.1: PBS; for others, see Montana PBS § Subchannels

Ownership
- Owner: Montana State University

History
- First air date: August 29, 1969
- Former channel numbers: Analog: 3 (VHF, 1969–2009)
- Former affiliations: Independent (1969–1970); NBC (1970–1984; via KOUS, 1984–1987; via KULR-TV, 1998–2024); ABC (via KOUS/KSVI, 1987–1996); Fox (secondary 1994–1995, primary 1995–1998); UPN/The WB (secondary, 1997–1998); Silent (2024–2025)
- Call sign meaning: Cayuse, a type of Native American pony

Technical information
- Licensing authority: FCC
- Facility ID: 5237
- ERP: 2.9 kW
- HAAT: 30 m (98 ft)
- Transmitter coordinates: 46°25′34″N 105°51′40″W

Links
- Public license information: Public file; LMS
- Website: www.montanapbs.org

KYUS-TV (channel 3) is a PBS member television station in Miles City, Montana, United States. Owned by Montana State University (MSU), it is operated as part of the Montana PBS state network, a joint venture with the University of Montana (UM). KYUS-TV broadcasts to eastern Montana from a transmitter northwest of Miles City; master control and internal operations are based at the network's headquarters in the Visual Communications Building on the MSU campus in Bozeman.

At one point known as the smallest network affiliate in the country, KYUS was a standalone NBC affiliate from 1970 until 1984, with local programming and newscasts all presented by founding owner David Rivenes. While never turning a profit, KYUS's hyperlocal focus eventually earned both Rivenes and the station national recognition. In 1984, it was sold and became a full-time satellite of then-NBC affiliate KOUS-TV in Billings and its successor station, ABC affiliate KSVI. Purchased in 1995 by Marks Radio Group, which also owned several radio stations in Montana and KXGN-TV in Glendive, the station became a standalone primary Fox affiliate, later supplemented with UPN and The WB. KYUS-TV again became a satellite in 1998, this time with Billings NBC affiliate KULR-TV via a time brokerage agreement; this later evolved into an informal agreement with no exchange of money, while Marks continued to operate the station as a public service. This agreement concluded at the end of 2024, at which point KYUS went dark. MSU purchased both KYUS and KXGN-TV in July 2025.

== History ==
KYUS-TV went on the air on August 29, 1969, under the ownership of Custer Broadcasting Corporation. Originally an independent station, it joined NBC in 1970. In its early years, KYUS was known as the smallest network affiliate in America. The station's principal owner, David Rivenes, was not a stranger to television. In 1957, he became the manager of a closed-circuit television station, International Telemeter, launched for Miles City, which rebroadcast network programming on film two weeks after airing on terrestrial television. The station shut down after this practice was barred, but Rivenes, who shouldered the blame for the closure, sought a licensed station for Miles City. To fund the station's launch, Rivenes and a business associate took out a $300,000 loan, which took nearly a decade to pay off; he later told a Newspaper Enterprise Association reporter, "even way back then we had a distinction... everyone said we were the TV station most apt to go belly up".

KYUS's studios and transmitter were located in a small aluminum shed on a ridge outside of the city proper, approximately the size of a tennis court. Along with carrying the NBC network schedule, Rivenes did the news, sports, weather and reporting himself, reading newspaper clippings as a wire service was cost-prohibitive. He also hosted much of the station's other local programming (which comprised up to five hours of the KYUS schedule) along with his wife, Ella. Ella also hosted a cooking show, which David frequently guest-hosted for, even as his cooking skills were limited. In a 1980 interview with Sports Illustrated, Rivenes said that the local programs, which were broadcast in lieu of acquiring syndicated programming, were "what the FCC wants: real public service television". A Federal Communications Commission (FCC) inspector once visited the station and recorded 30 violations, but excluded KYUS's daily sign-on practice of a camera focused on a wind-up toy monkey set to recorded German music instead of a test pattern; Rivenes claimed it was because the inspector started humming along with the music.

During the station's early years, KYUS did not turn a profit and was supported by Rivenes's title insurance business, which he maintained alongside a typical 16-hour day at the station. Rivenes never drew a salary at KYUS and told a reporter from The Washington Star in 1978, "I don't know exactly what cash flow is, but I know we don't have it." Low local advertising rates, approximately $10 a minute in 1977, caused the station to lose money, and many ads were often bartered out for services from meals to propane to malted milk. Rivenes's pet cat Booker was a presence at the studios and frequently cameoed during programming, and once presented a caught live mouse during a newscast. Legislator Max Baucus was a frequent guest, and at times did the weather reports during Rivenes's newscast, sometimes unannounced. As a practical joke, Rivenes had then-lieutenant governor Ted Schwinden read an announcement for a Montana Republican Party event during an interview, even though Schwinden was a Democrat. The station's small stature, thriftiness and hyperlocal fare led Rivenes to be featured in the late 1970s on Real People, To Tell the Truth, The Wall Street Journal, Newsweek and TV Guide for his career.

Rivenes was part of a group, led by KYUS chief engineer Charles Vick, that filed to construct KOUS-TV on channel 4 in Hardin, Montana, serving the Billings market. While the channel 4 allocation in Hardin had been in place since the 1950s, it had not been claimed owing to the town's remoteness. When KOUS-TV took to the air in 1980 with Vick as president, it initially carried NBC programming KTVQ declined, while KTVQ and KULR-TV predicted failure for the station. Due to a lack of financing, Rivenes sold controlling stock in KOUS, which prompted him to sell KYUS outright. In 1984, the Rivenes family sold KYUS to the owners of KOUS-TV for $200,000; at the end of May, channel 3 became a satellite of KOUS, and the station's local programming was discontinued. Rivenes said, "we had a meeting with [KOUS ownership] on the 30th and they took over on the 31st and that was that", and expressed regret for not holding much fanfare due to the abruptness of the sale. KYUS, along with KOUS, switched to ABC in August 1987. After KOUS moved its programming to KSVI (channel 6) in 1993, KYUS became a satellite of KSVI.

As a satellite of KOUS-TV and KSVI, KYUS-TV was on the verge of closure several times, as the station generated insufficient revenue to cover its costs. In addition, the station's owner, Big Horn Communications, had difficulties listing KYUS for sale due to the size and location of Miles City; one media brokerage company, Blackburn & Company, said it was "economically impossible" for KYUS to operate as a standalone station. Ultimately, Big Horn sold the station to Stephen A. Marks in 1995. Marks originally proposed to operate KYUS as a satellite of KXGN-TV, his CBS and NBC affiliate in Glendive. However, shortly after, KYUS-TV announced it would become a Fox affiliate. By 1997, channel 3 had also added secondary affiliations with UPN and The WB.

After two years with Fox, KYUS-TV became a satellite of KULR-TV under a time brokerage agreement on May 1, 1998. The original agreement expired after ten years; KYUS-TV then broadcast KULR-TV's programming under a series of informal agreements, receiving no payment and keeping no advertising income. Although the station generated no revenue of its own, Marks continued to operate it as a public service.

In 2006, Stephen Marks added radio stations KMTA and KKRY to his Miles City holdings. Marks died on May 11, 2022; in early 2024, his estate sold Marks' Montana and North Dakota radio stations, including KMTA and KYUS-FM (the former KKRY), to Andrew Sturlaugson's P&A Media, while retaining KYUS-TV and KXGN-TV. KYUS-TV ceased operations on December 31, 2024, the same date KXGN-TV dropped their NBC subchannel (itself largely a KULR simulcast) and ceased all in-studio production, but a special temporary authority request to remain silent was not filed until June 27, 2025, due to an "inadvertent oversight". In the request, Mary Marks—the executor of Marks' estate—stated KYUS was in the process of being sold and was considering airing "alternate programming sources" in the interregnum.

On July 8, 2025, the Marks Group filed to sell KYUS-TV and KXGN-TV to Montana State University—owner of Montana PBS, the state's public television broadcaster—for $375,000; the remainder of the stations' value was credited as a donation. KYUS-TV resumed operations on July 29, 2025. The sale was consummated on October 22, 2025, with both stations joining the Montana PBS network. (Note: Due to the federal government shutdown, the consummation paperwork was filed on November 24, 2025.) KYUS-TV and KXGN-TV, which were the Marks Group's final broadcast properties, brought over-the-air public television service to far eastern Montana for the first time; except for translators in the northeastern and southeastern parts of the state, Montana PBS did not previously own transmitters east of Billings.

== Technical information ==
KYUS-TV's transmitter is located northwest of Miles City, opposite Frank Wiley Field off of Montana Highway 59.
