= Miles City Bucking Horse Sale =

The Miles City Bucking Horse Sale is a major auction of rodeo stock held the third full (two-day) weekend every May in Miles City, Montana, United States, and the premier social event for the community. Accompanied by a parade, a horse racing meet, a rodeo and a number of social activities, it attracts rodeo stock contractors from the United States and Canada who are looking for bucking horse, and bucking bull prospects.

The first official Miles City Bucking Horse Sale began in 1951, though an unofficial sale was held in 1950.

"It was because Les Boe, of the Miles City Livestock Center, bought a bunch of yearling steers down at Ekalaka from a guy named Heavy Lester," said the historian John Moore. "When Lester threw in 35 head of bucking horses in the deal, Boe did not know what to do with the bucking horses. So the idea of having a sale kinda came about. They advertised to people, and the sale lasted something like 3 full days."

Horses consigned to the sale are not "wild" horses or Mustangs which, under the Wild and Free-Roaming Horses and Burros Act of 1971, cannot be sold. Rather, consignments are horses selectively bred as bucking stock, excess or unsalable young horses from large ranches and spoiled riding horses that have become particularly adept at bucking off riders. Likewise, most consigned bulls are bred specifically as bucking stock.

The Miles City Bucking Horse Sale was also the theme of a novelty country and western song by the Montana writer, Greg Keeler, on the album Songs of Fishing, Sheep and Guns in Montana.

The sale is held annually, regardless of weather.
