= MPAN (TV channel) =

Legislative broadcaster in Montana, United States

- Country: United States
- Broadcast area: Montana

History
- Founded: 2001
- Launched: January 2007
- Former names: TVMT (Television Montana)

Links
- Website: www.montanapbs.org/mpan/

Availability

Terrestrial
- Montana PBS: DT5 digital subchannels

MPAN, short for "Montana Public Affairs Network", is a full-time television channel available on Montana cable systems, along with the DT5 digital subchannel on the member stations of the Montana PBS state network. The service commenced in January 2007. MPAN covers both houses of the Montana State Legislature, as well as other hearings staged in the Montana State Capitol at Helena.

The service was first introduced in 2001 as TVMT (Television Montana). When it was introduced, it was only a part-time service, offering only Legislature coverage on local Government-access television (GATV) cable channels in Montana. The network was renamed to Montana Public Affairs Network on November 1, 2018.

MPAN is available to 350,000 cable television customers across Montana.

The channel does not have edited content.
