= Garfield County, Montana =

County in Montana, United States

- County
- Garfield County Museum in Jordan

- Location within the U.S. state of Montana
- Coordinates: 47°17′N 106°59′W
- Country: United States
- State: Montana
- Founded: February 7, 1919
- Seat: Jordan
- Largest town: Jordan

Area
  - Total: 4,847 sq mi (12,550 km^{2})
  - Land: 4,675 sq mi (12,110 km^{2})
  - Water: 172 sq mi (450 km^{2}) 3.6%

Population (2020)
  - Total: 1,173
  - Estimate (2025): 1,148 ▼
  - Density: 0.2509/sq mi (0.09688/km^{2})
- Time zone: UTC−7 (Mountain)
  - Summer (DST): UTC−6 (MDT)
- Congressional district: 2nd
- Website: garfieldcountymt.gov
- Montana county number 50

Garfield County is a county located in the U.S. state of Montana. As of the 2020 census, the population was 1,173. Its county seat is Jordan. Garfield County is noteworthy as the site of the discovery and excavation of four of the world's dozen or so major specimens (as of 1994) of Tyrannosaurus rex. A cast of the skull of one of these dinosaurs is on display at the Garfield County Museum.

== Geography ==
According to the United States Census Bureau, the county has a total area of 4,847 square miles (12,550 km^{2}), of which 4,675 square miles (12,110 km^{2}) is land and 172 square miles (450 km^{2}) (3.6%) is water. Its average population density of 0.1058 inhabitants per square kilometre (0.274 inhabitants/mi^{2}) is the third-lowest of any county outside of Alaska (behind Loving County, Texas and Esmeralda County, Nevada).

=== Major highways ===
- Montana Highway 22
- Montana Highway 59
- Montana Highway 24
- Montana Highway 200

=== Adjacent counties ===
- Phillips County – northwest
- Valley County – north
- McCone County – east
- Prairie County – east
- Custer County – southeast
- Rosebud County – south
- Petroleum County – west

=== National protected area ===
- Charles M. Russell National Wildlife Refuge (part)

== Demographics ==
Historical population
Census	Pop.	Note	%±
1920	5,368		—
1930	4,252		−20.8%
1940	2,641		−37.9%
1950	2,172		−17.8%
1960	1,981		−8.8%
1970	1,796		−9.3%
1980	1,656		−7.8%
1990	1,589		−4.0%
2000	1,279		−19.5%
2010	1,206		−5.7%
2020	1,173		−2.7%
2025 (est.)	1,148	▼	−2.1%
U.S. Decennial Census; 1790–1960, 1900–1990, 1990–2000, 2010–2020

=== 2020 census ===
As of the 2020 census, the county had a population of 1,173. Of the residents, 23.5% were under the age of 18 and 28.0% were 65 years of age or older; the median age was 44.9 years. For every 100 females there were 101.2 males, and for every 100 females age 18 and over there were 102.0 males. 0.0% of residents lived in urban areas and 100.0% lived in rural areas.

The racial makeup of the county was 96.0% White, 0.0% Black or African American, 0.9% American Indian and Alaska Native, 0.2% Asian, 0.5% from some other race, and 2.4% from two or more races. Hispanic or Latino residents of any race comprised 1.2% of the population.

There were 509 households in the county, of which 26.5% had children under the age of 18 living with them and 20.0% had a female householder with no spouse or partner present. About 32.2% of all households were made up of individuals and 15.3% had someone living alone who was 65 years of age or older.

There were 795 housing units, of which 36.0% were vacant. Among occupied housing units, 76.4% were owner-occupied and 23.6% were renter-occupied. The homeowner vacancy rate was 0.0% and the rental vacancy rate was 11.6%.

=== 2010 census ===
As of the 2010 census, there were 1,206 people, 532 households, and 347 families living in the county. The population density was 0.3 inhabitants per square mile (0.12/km^{2}). There were 844 housing units at an average density of 0.2 per square mile (0.077/km^{2}). The racial makeup of the county was 98.6% white, 0.4% American Indian, 0.2% black or African American, 0.1% Asian, 0.2% from other races, and 0.5% from two or more races. Those of Hispanic or Latino origin made up 0.2% of the population. In terms of ancestry, 33.3% were German, 16.9% were Irish, 15.0% were Norwegian, 13.3% were English, 10.5% were American, 8.1% were Swedish, and 7.4% were Scottish.

Of the 532 households, 22.6% had children under the age of 18 living with them, 57.0% were married couples living together, 5.1% had a female householder with no husband present, 34.8% were non-families, and 30.3% of all households were made up of individuals. The average household size was 2.27 and the average family size was 2.86. The median age was 46.4 years.

The median income for a household in the county was $42,955 and the median income for a family was $54,375. Males had a median income of $37,813 versus $19,286 for females. The per capita income for the county was $22,424. About 8.1% of families and 10.7% of the population were below the poverty line, including 16.1% of those under age 18 and 8.9% of those age 65 or over.

== Politics ==
Garfield is an overwhelmingly Republican county. It has been the most Republican county in Montana since the 2004 United States presidential election.

The last Democratic presidential candidate to carry the county was Franklin D. Roosevelt in 1940, and in the last nine Presidential elections no Democratic candidate has managed to receive more than 20 percent. In the 2016, 2020, and 2024 elections, Garfield was the only county in Montana to give over 90% of the vote to the Republican nominee, namely Donald Trump.

United States presidential election results for Garfield County, Montana
Year	Republican		Democratic		Third party(ies)	
Year	No.	%	No.	%	No.	%
1920	1,226	68.19%	484	26.92%	88	4.89%
1924	876	50.55%	355	20.48%	502	28.97%
1928	1,176	69.67%	499	29.56%	13	0.77%
1932	678	37.98%	1,044	58.49%	63	3.53%
1936	548	34.75%	991	62.84%	38	2.41%
1940	625	49.17%	644	50.67%	2	0.16%
1944	553	53.53%	478	46.27%	2	0.19%
1948	501	51.49%	451	46.35%	21	2.16%
1952	723	72.74%	269	27.06%	2	0.20%
1956	558	56.82%	424	43.18%	0	0.00%
1960	515	58.52%	363	41.25%	2	0.23%
1964	509	56.81%	384	42.86%	3	0.33%
1968	542	64.22%	190	22.51%	112	13.27%
1972	695	77.83%	173	19.37%	25	2.80%
1976	625	67.79%	273	29.61%	24	2.60%
1980	760	78.03%	169	17.35%	45	4.62%
1984	770	84.52%	134	14.71%	7	0.77%
1988	631	74.15%	196	23.03%	24	2.82%
1992	403	49.21%	125	15.26%	291	35.53%
1996	562	75.34%	107	14.34%	77	10.32%
2000	651	87.50%	61	8.20%	32	4.30%
2004	590	90.08%	52	7.94%	13	1.98%
2008	598	82.26%	110	15.13%	19	2.61%
2012	622	88.73%	66	9.42%	13	1.85%
2016	653	90.95%	34	4.74%	31	4.32%
2020	764	93.97%	41	5.04%	8	0.98%
2024	756	94.50%	39	4.88%	5	0.63%

== Communities ==
=== Town ===
- Jordan (county seat)

=== Unincorporated communities ===
- Benzien
- Big Dry
- Brusett
- Cohagen
- Haxby
- Hillside
- Mosby
- Sand Springs
- Steve Forks
- Tindall

== See also ==
- List of lakes in Garfield County, Montana
- List of mountains in Garfield County, Montana
- National Register of Historic Places listings in Garfield County MT
