= Jordan, Montana =

Jordan
- Town
- Downtown Jordan in 2009

- Location of Jordan, Montana
- Coordinates: 47°19′15″N 106°54′36″W
- Country: United States
- State: Montana
- County: Garfield

Area
  - Total: 0.35 sq mi (0.90 km^{2})
  - Land: 0.35 sq mi (0.90 km^{2})
  - Water: 0 sq mi (0.00 km^{2})
- Elevation: 2,602 ft (793 m)

Population (2020)
  - Total: 356
  - Density: 1,020.1/sq mi (393.88/km^{2})
- Time zone: UTC-7 (Mountain (MST))
  - Summer (DST): UTC-6 (MDT)
- ZIP code: 59337
- Area code: 406
- FIPS code: 30-39925

Jordan is a town in and the county seat of Garfield County, Montana, United States. The population was 356 at the 2020 census. It is Garfield County's only incorporated community.

== History ==
Jordan was settled in 1896. The founder, Arthur Jordan, had hunted the area and decided to settle with his family in 1896 along the banks of the Big Dry Creek.

A post office was opened in Jordan on July 11, 1899. Afterward, a town began building around the post office. There were saloons, rooming houses, livery stables, blacksmiths, and stores. In the later part of the 1910s, the homestead boom hit Garfield County, which was then actually part of Dawson County to the east. By 1919, the citizens reached a consensus to form a county of their own, therefore establishing Garfield County. Jordan was finally chosen as the county seat, by popular vote. The Great Northern Railroad had proposed a route starting from Lewiston, MT eastbound through Winnett, MT and Jordan, MT, and connecting to their line at Richey, MT. Grading had been completed between Lewiston, MT and Winnett, MT but no track was laid.

Jordan was incorporated as a town in 1951.

On March 25, 1996, an 81-day-long standoff between an anti-government gang known as the Montana Freemen and federal officers began near Jordan.

== Geography ==
Montana Highway 59 and Montana Highway 200 intersect just south of town. Fort Peck Lake is nearby.

According to the United States Census Bureau, the town has a total area of 0.34 square miles (0.88 km^{2}), all land.

=== Climate ===
Jordan experiences a semi-arid climate (Köppen BSk) with long, freezing although exceedingly variable, and dry winters alongside hot, wetter summers. The town is noted for its extreme weather: on December 15, 2009, the low was −40 °F (−40 °C).

Jordan ranks 10th in the U.S. in temperature range, from its lowest at −58 °F (−50 °C), to its highest at 112 °F (44.4 °C), a range of 170 °F (94 °C), and within February alone the range is 132 °F or 73.3 °C. An illustration of the extreme year-to-year winter climate variability can be seen in February 1936 averaging −9.5 °F (−23.1 °C), whereas February 1954 averaged 36.9 °F (2.7 °C), or a whopping 46.4 °F (25.8 °C) warmer.

Climate data for Jordan, Montana, 1991–2020 normals, extremes 1905–present
Month	Jan	Feb	Mar	Apr	May	Jun	Jul	Aug	Sep	Oct	Nov	Dec	Year
Record high °F (°C)	68 (20)	74 (23)	82 (28)	94 (34)	102 (39)	111 (44)	112 (44)	110 (43)	107 (42)	95 (35)	80 (27)	78 (26)	112 (44)
Mean maximum °F (°C)	52.3 (11.3)	56.4 (13.6)	70.4 (21.3)	80.7 (27.1)	88.8 (31.6)	97.0 (36.1)	101.4 (38.6)	100.7 (38.2)	95.1 (35.1)	83.6 (28.7)	67.5 (19.7)	53.9 (12.2)	103.4 (39.7)
Mean daily maximum °F (°C)	29.9 (−1.2)	34.0 (1.1)	45.8 (7.7)	57.6 (14.2)	67.4 (19.7)	76.9 (24.9)	87.1 (30.6)	86.5 (30.3)	74.6 (23.7)	59.4 (15.2)	44.4 (6.9)	33.2 (0.7)	58.1 (14.5)
Daily mean °F (°C)	17.2 (−8.2)	20.9 (−6.2)	32.1 (0.1)	43.2 (6.2)	53.1 (11.7)	63.1 (17.3)	71.0 (21.7)	69.4 (20.8)	57.6 (14.2)	44.4 (6.9)	30.8 (−0.7)	20.4 (−6.4)	43.6 (6.5)
Mean daily minimum °F (°C)	4.6 (−15.2)	7.7 (−13.5)	18.4 (−7.6)	28.9 (−1.7)	38.7 (3.7)	49.3 (9.6)	54.8 (12.7)	52.2 (11.2)	40.6 (4.8)	29.4 (−1.4)	17.2 (−8.2)	7.6 (−13.6)	29.1 (−1.6)
Mean minimum °F (°C)	−22.6 (−30.3)	−15.0 (−26.1)	0.3 (−17.6)	16.5 (−8.6)	26.0 (−3.3)	37.2 (2.9)	44.6 (7.0)	40.2 (4.6)	25.8 (−3.4)	12.2 (−11.0)	−4.6 (−20.3)	−21.4 (−29.7)	−31.4 (−35.2)
Record low °F (°C)	−51 (−46)	−58 (−50)	−35 (−37)	−13 (−25)	10 (−12)	29 (−2)	31 (−1)	29 (−2)	13 (−11)	−14 (−26)	−32 (−36)	−46 (−43)	−58 (−50)
Average precipitation inches (mm)	0.30 (7.6)	0.35 (8.9)	0.52 (13)	1.36 (35)	2.19 (56)	2.65 (67)	1.65 (42)	1.34 (34)	1.06 (27)	1.16 (29)	0.49 (12)	0.38 (9.7)	13.45 (341.2)
Average precipitation days (≥ 0.01 in)	3.3	3.8	4.4	6.0	8.0	8.5	6.7	4.8	4.4	4.9	3.5	4.0	62.3
Source 1: NOAA
Source 2: National Weather Service (mean maxima/minima 1981–2010)

== Demographics ==
Historical population
Census	Pop.	Note	%±
1960	557		—
1970	529		−5.0%
1980	485		−8.3%
1990	494		1.9%
2000	364		−26.3%
2010	343		−5.8%
2020	356		3.8%
U.S. Decennial Census

=== 2010 census ===
As of the census of 2010, there were 343 people, 170 households, and 93 families residing in the town. The population density was 1,008.8 inhabitants per square mile (389.5/km^{2}). There were 206 housing units at an average density of 605.9 per square mile (233.9/km^{2}). The racial makeup of the town was 98.8% White, 0.6% Native American, 0.3% from other races, and 0.3% from two or more races. Hispanic or Latino people of any race were 0.9% of the population.

There were 170 households, of which 18.2% had children under the age of 18 living with them, 42.9% were married couples living together, 8.2% had a female householder with no husband present, 3.5% had a male householder with no wife present, and 45.3% were non-families. 37.6% of all households were made up of individuals, and 18.9% had someone living alone who was 65 years of age or older. The average household size was 2.02 and the average family size was 2.71.

The median age in the town was 48.8 years. 18.7% of residents were under the age of 18; 6.1% were between the ages of 18 and 24; 19.2% were from 25 to 44; 31% were from 45 to 64; and 25.1% were 65 years of age or older. The gender makeup of the town was 49.0% male and 51.0% female.

=== 2000 census ===
As of the census of 2000, there were 364 people, 169 households, and 98 families residing in the town. The population density was 1,024.9 inhabitants per square mile (395.7/km^{2}). There were 233 housing units at an average density of 656.0 per square mile (253.3/km^{2}). The racial makeup of the town was 98.63% White, 0.27% African American, 0.27% Pacific Islander, and 0.82% from two or more races. Hispanic or Latino people of any race were 1.37% of the population.

View entering Jordan from the south on MT-200

There were 169 households, out of which 26.0% had children under the age of 18 living with them, 46.2% were married couples living together, 8.3% had a female householder with no husband present, and 42.0% were non-families. 39.1% of all households were made up of individuals, and 23.1% had someone living alone who was 65 years of age or older. The average household size was 2.08 and the average family size was 2.80.

In the town, the population was spread out, with 22.3% under the age of 18, 6.3% from 18 to 24, 23.1% from 25 to 44, 22.3% from 45 to 64, and 26.1% who were 65 years of age or older. The median age was 43 years. For every 100 females there were 94.7 males. For every 100 females age 18 and over, there were 87.4 males.

The median income for a household in the town was $26,250, and the median income for a family was $34,583. Males had a median income of $21,250 versus $11,979 for females. The per capita income for the town was $17,426. About 10.4% of families and 19.2% of the population were below the poverty line, including 36.4% of those under age 18 and 13.6% of those age 65 or over.

== Arts and culture ==
Garfield County Museum

Garfield County Museum has several fossils and a full-size Triceratops. There are replicas of a cabin and black smith shop inside and the old jail and school house are on museum grounds.

The Hell Creek Finger of Fort Peck Lake is near town.

Garfield County Library serves the area.

== Government ==
Bart Lammers was voted mayor in the 2025 election.

== Education ==
Jordan Public Schools educates students from kindergarten through 12th grade. They are known as the Mustangs. Garfield County District High School is a Class C school.

== Infrastructure ==
Garfield Motel on Main Street in 2026

Jordan Airport is a county-owned, public-use airport located two miles (4 km) northwest of town.

== Notable persons ==
- Wayne Hawkins, NFL player born in Jordan
- Jerry Kramer, NFL Hall of Fame guard and author; born here in 1936

== See also ==
- Hell Creek Formation
