= Montana Highway 59 =

State highway in Montana, United States

Montana Highway 59
- MT 59 highlighted in red

Route information
- Maintained by MDT
- Length: 195.389 mi (314.448 km)

Major junctions
- South end: WYO 59 at the Wyoming state line near Belle Creek
- US 212 at Broadus; I-94 at Miles City
- North end: MT 200 at Jordan

Location
- Country: United States
- State: Montana
- Counties: Powder River, Custer, Rosebud, Garfield

Highway system
- Montana Highway System; Interstate; US; State; Secondary
← MT 56	→ MT 64

Highway 59 (MT 59) is a 195.389-mile (314.448 km) state highway in Montana, United States, that connects Wyoming Highway 59 (WYO 59) in Wyoming with Montana Highway 200 (MT 200) near the south end of the town of Jordan. WYO 59 continues south 57 miles (92 km) to the city of Gillette. The landscape traversed by MT 59 is mostly hilly and arid, largely used for open-range grazing; the only major commercial areas are the towns of Broadus and Miles City.

For approximately 4 miles (6.4 km) in and near Broadus, MT 59 is concurrent with U.S. Route 212 (US 212).

== Route description ==
MT 59 continues as Fence Creek Road from the Wyoming state line across the desert for several miles before travelling concurrently with US 212 north. The highway enters the town of Broadus as Park Avenue heading north, and turns onto Holt Street, leaving the town headed west. Passing by the Broadus Airport and the Rolling Hills Golf Course, MT 59 splits off from US 212 and continues northwest and then north through Olive and through meadows. Several miles later, MT 59 travels through Volborg before entering Miles City and has an interchange with Interstate 94 (I-94) on Haynes Avenue. The route turns west on Main Street, briefly travelling concurrently with I-94 Business (I-94 Bus.) before turning northwest on North 7th Street and crossing the Yellowstone River. MT 59 intersects Montana Secondary Highway 489 (S-489) across from the Miles City Airport before continuing through the plains of eastern Montana. The highway travels through Angela and Cohagen before ending at MT 200 in Jordan.

== History ==
The current MT 59 is an amalgamation of three roadway segments, each formerly numbered separately. The highway south of Broadus was originally designated as S-319. From Broadus to Miles City, the highway was U.S. Route 312 (US 312) until 1979, and MT 59 north of Miles City was originally MT 22. Although US 312 continued west from Miles City to Billings, this was a concurrency with US 10 (and later I-90), and only the part between Miles City and Broadus was independent. However, from 1959 to 1962, US 312 extended west to Yellowstone National Park, and its east end was at US 12 in Forsyth. In 1962, US 212, which had ended in Miles City, was rerouted to absorb former US 312 southwest of Billings, and US 312 was extended southeast to Broadus over former US 212.

== Major intersections ==
County	Location	mi	km	Destinations	Notes
Powder River		0.000	0.000	WYO 59 south – Gillette	Continuation into Wyoming
Powder River		8.154	13.123	S-544 east – Belle Creek	Western terminus of S-544
Powder River		29.304	47.160	US 212 east – Alzada, Belle Fourche	South end of US 212 concurrency
Powder River		31.856	51.267	Powderville (S-398 north)	Southern terminus of S-398
Powder River		33.752	54.319	S-391 south	Northern terminus of S-391
Powder River		36.422	58.616	US 212 west – Billings	North end of US 212 concurrency
Custer		99.544	160.201	S-332 south (Tongue River Road)	Northern terminus of S-332
Custer	Miles City	110.410	177.688	I-94 (US 12) – Billings, Bismarck	I-94 exit 138
Custer	Miles City	112.244	180.639	I-94 BL east	South end of I-94 Bus. concurrency
Custer	Miles City	112.676	181.334	I-94 BL west (Main Street)	North end of I-94 Bus. concurrency
Custer		114.864	184.856	S-489 east – Airport, Kinsey, Pirogue Island State Park	Western terminus of S-489
Rosebud	Rock Springs	147.653	237.624	S-462 north	Southern terminus of S-462
Garfield		195.389	314.448	MT 200 – Lewistown, Jordan	Northern terminus
1.000 mi = 1.609 km; 1.000 km = 0.621 mi: Concurrency terminus

== See also ==
- List of state highways in Montana
