= Miles City, Montana =

City in Montana, United States

- City
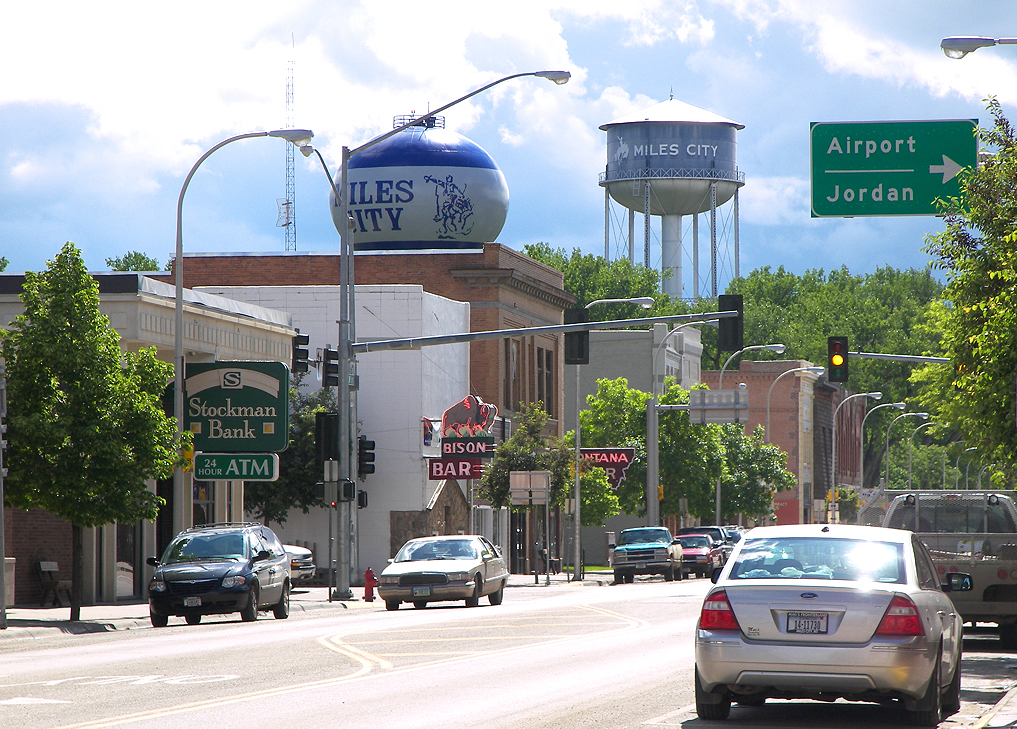
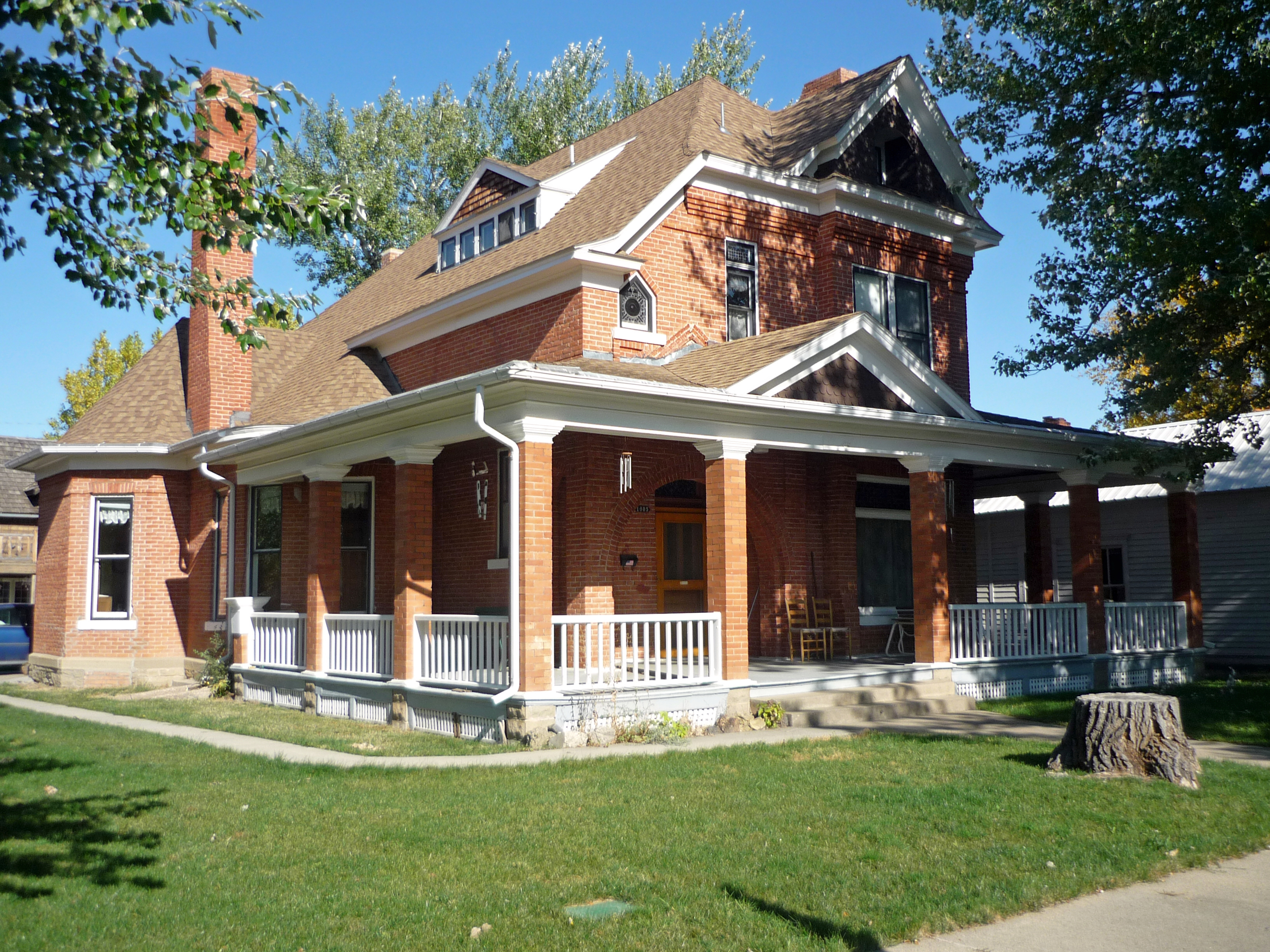
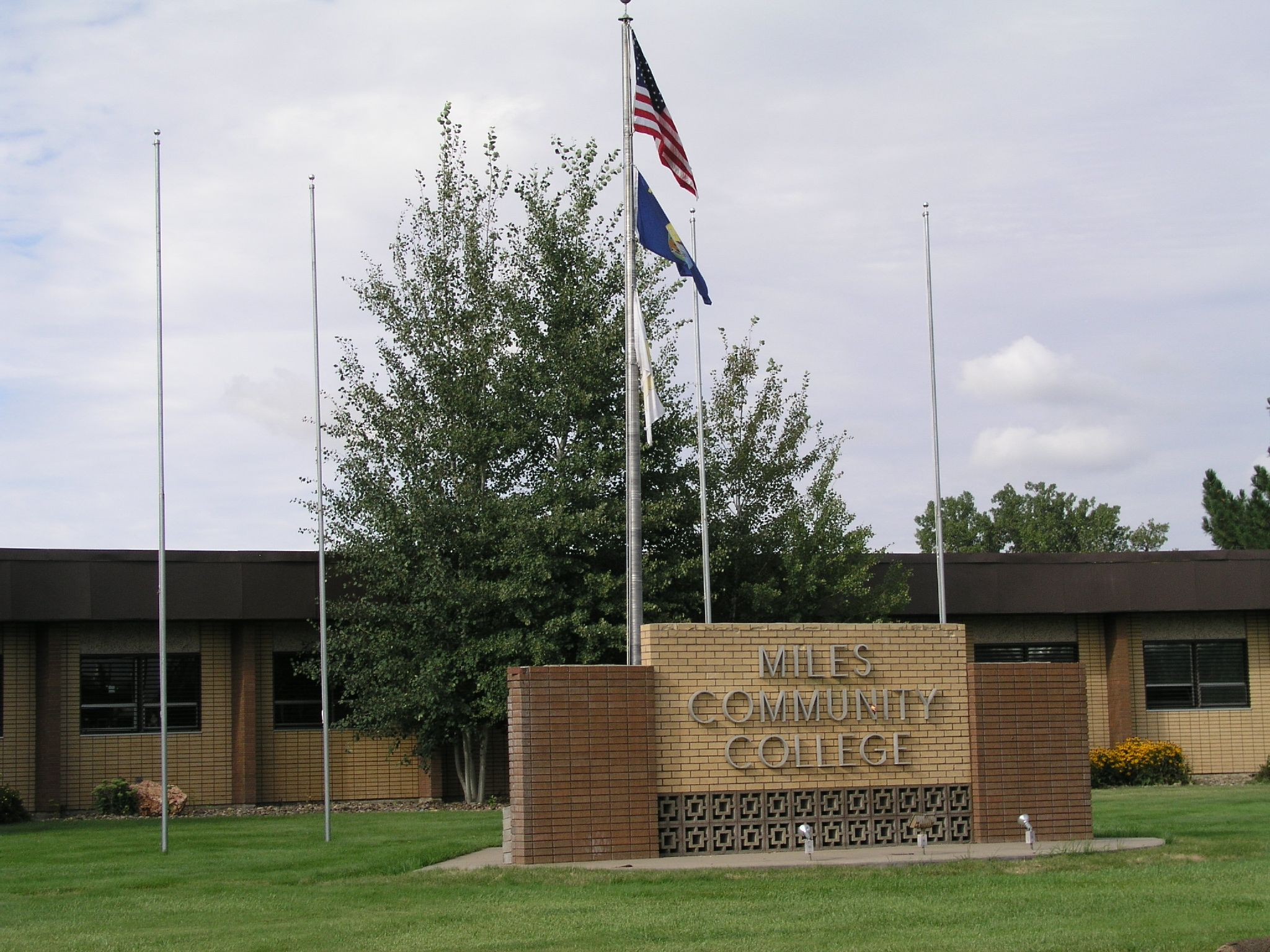
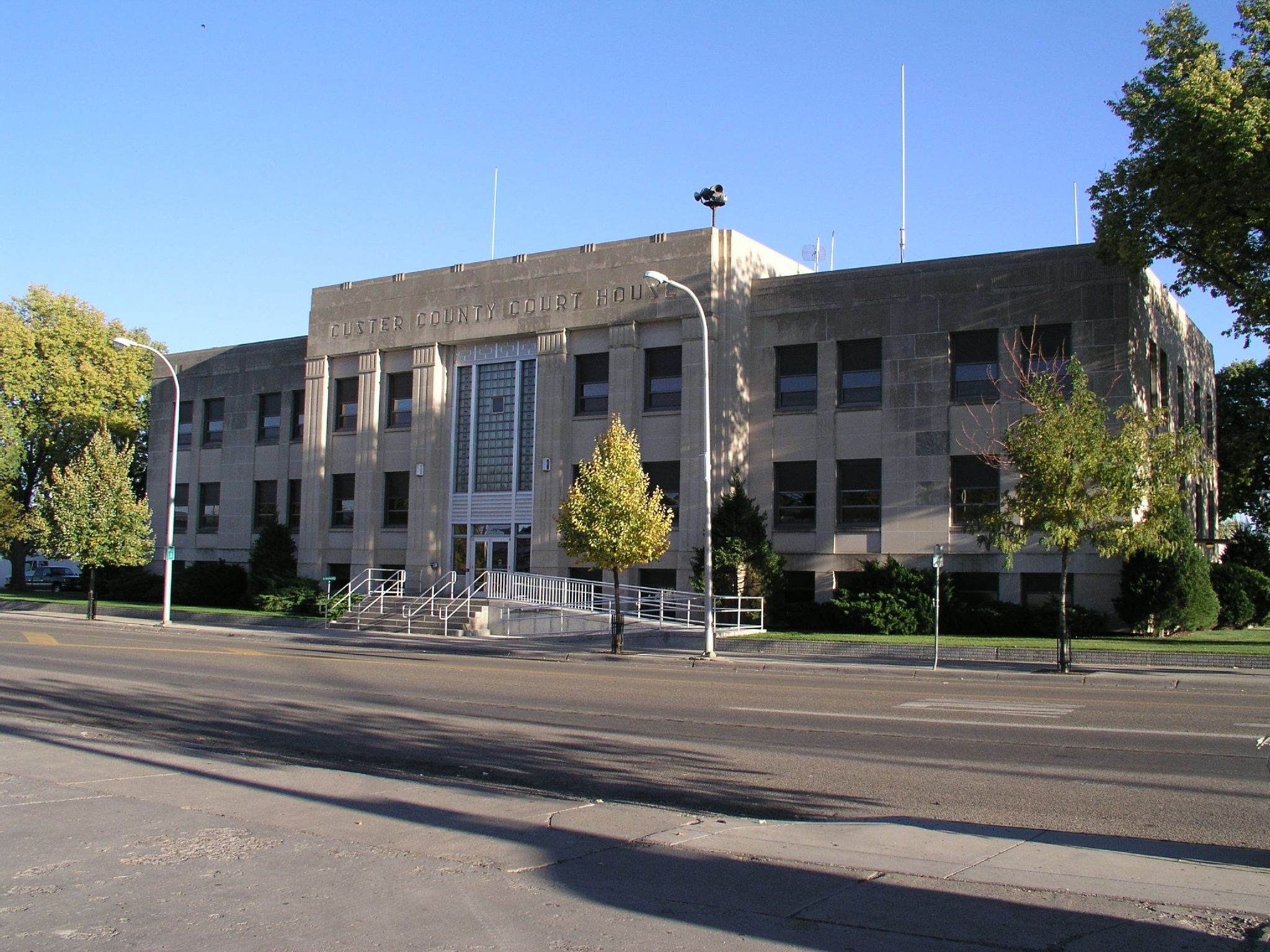
- Downtown Miles City William Harmon House Miles Community College Custer County Courthouse

- Logo

- Location of Miles City, Montana

- Location in the United States
- Coordinates: 46°24′30″N 105°50′24″W
- Country: United States
- State: Montana
- County: Custer

Government
  - Mayor: Dwayne Andrews

Area
  - Total: 3.37 sq mi (8.72 km^{2})
  - Land: 3.36 sq mi (8.71 km^{2})
  - Water: 0.0039 sq mi (0.01 km^{2})
- Elevation: 2,362 ft (720 m)

Population (2020)
  - Total: 8,354
  - Density: 2,485.0/sq mi (959.45/km^{2})
- Time zone: UTC−7 (Mountain (MST))
  - Summer (DST): UTC−6 (MDT)
- ZIP Code: 59301
- Area code: 406
- FIPS code: 30-49525
- GNIS feature ID: 0774202
- Website: www.milescitymt.gov

Miles City is a city in and the county seat of Custer County, Montana, United States. The population was 8,354 at the 2020 census.

== History ==
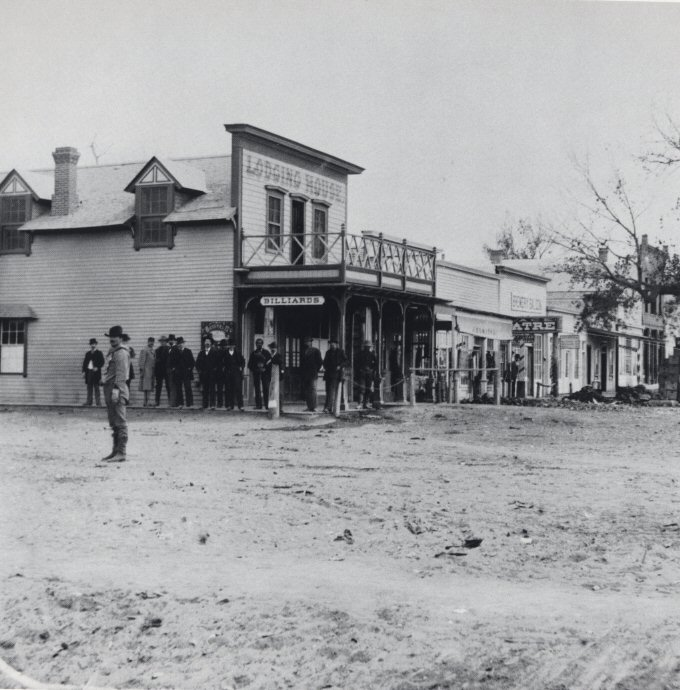
Miles City, 1881

After the Battle of the Little Bighorn in 1876, the U.S. Army created forts in eastern Montana, including one where the north-flowing Tongue River flowed into the east-flowing Yellowstone River. The first fort was known as the Tongue River Cantonment or the Tongue River Barracks and was founded on August 27, 1876. A second, permanent fort was constructed on higher ground two miles to the west of the mouth of the Tongue and this became Fort Keogh.

Fort Keogh (named after Captain Myles Keogh, one of the battle dead, whose horse, Comanche, was the lone survivor of Custer's command) started as a few rough winter cabins, but grew into a moderate sized western fort, from which its commander, General Nelson A. Miles, effectively brought the remaining "uncontrolled" Native Americans into subjugation during the last decade of the 1800s.

Nelson Miles said that "whiskey caused him more trouble than the Indians" and, after tiring of drunken soldiers causing problems during the winter campaign, evicted the sutlers who provided "liquid stock" in the spring of 1877. Moving two miles due east of the Tongue River Cantonment, these early merchants founded the first Miles City. Although fondly referred to as "Milestown," the first post office and first official plat both called the town "Miles City." When the old cantonment moved two miles west, the town literally picked up and followed, moving to the current site. The last occupants of Old Miles City stayed on until 1900 but the new community was the one that grew.

Before the town itself was founded, George Miles, the nephew of General Miles, who had accompanied his uncle on the western expedition and served in the quartermasters office, bought a herd of sheep, the first of many commercial enterprises in his involvement with the core founders of the town.

Livestock speculation brought thousands of cattle to the open ranges in the late 1880s, the railroad was extended through the area, and Texans drove numerous cattle to Miles City to fatten them on free grass and move them to where they could be loaded on trains bound for the slaughterhouses in Chicago (Milwaukee Railroad).

The burgeoning settlement of Miles City was incorporated as a town in 1887. The first mayor to serve was Eugene Henry "Skew" Johnson (born July 27, 1846, in Clarksville, Arkansas, died July 31, 1919, in Miles City, Montana); he served for one term.

Miles City established a municipal electric power utility company around that time of 1887 and it was a source of civic pride (as any city would have towards its own utilities) until during the 1920s, a traveling employee of Minnesota Northern Power (predecessor of current MDU Resources Group, Inc.) told the city council "the emperor has no clothes;" i.e., the system was far less efficient and in worse shape than they thought. The city council eventually put the question to the voters who instructed the city to sell the utility. By this time, the people with the competing Montana Power Company (now NorthWestern Energy's Montana division) became aware of this and were soon locked in an epic battle with Minnesota Northern over the franchise. A franchise election was held to determine who would serve Miles City on June 28, 1927. Minnesota Northern won by a scant 16 votes.

Miles City experienced rapid growth until the First World War (1914/1917–1918), era and following 1920s and 1930s, but became overshadowed by the upstart upriver town of Billings, which was at the cross roads of various land transportation routes. Billings became a center for banking and finance, oil refining, and medical services, and is now the largest city in the state of Montana.

The publicly owned Miles City Municipal Airport is located less than two miles (3.2 km) from town. Notably, it was during the beginning of the modern aviation era as the site of an early tragic scheduled airline passenger plane crash, involving Northwest Airlines Flight 1, which caught fire and crashed shortly after takeoff in January 1939.

== Geography ==
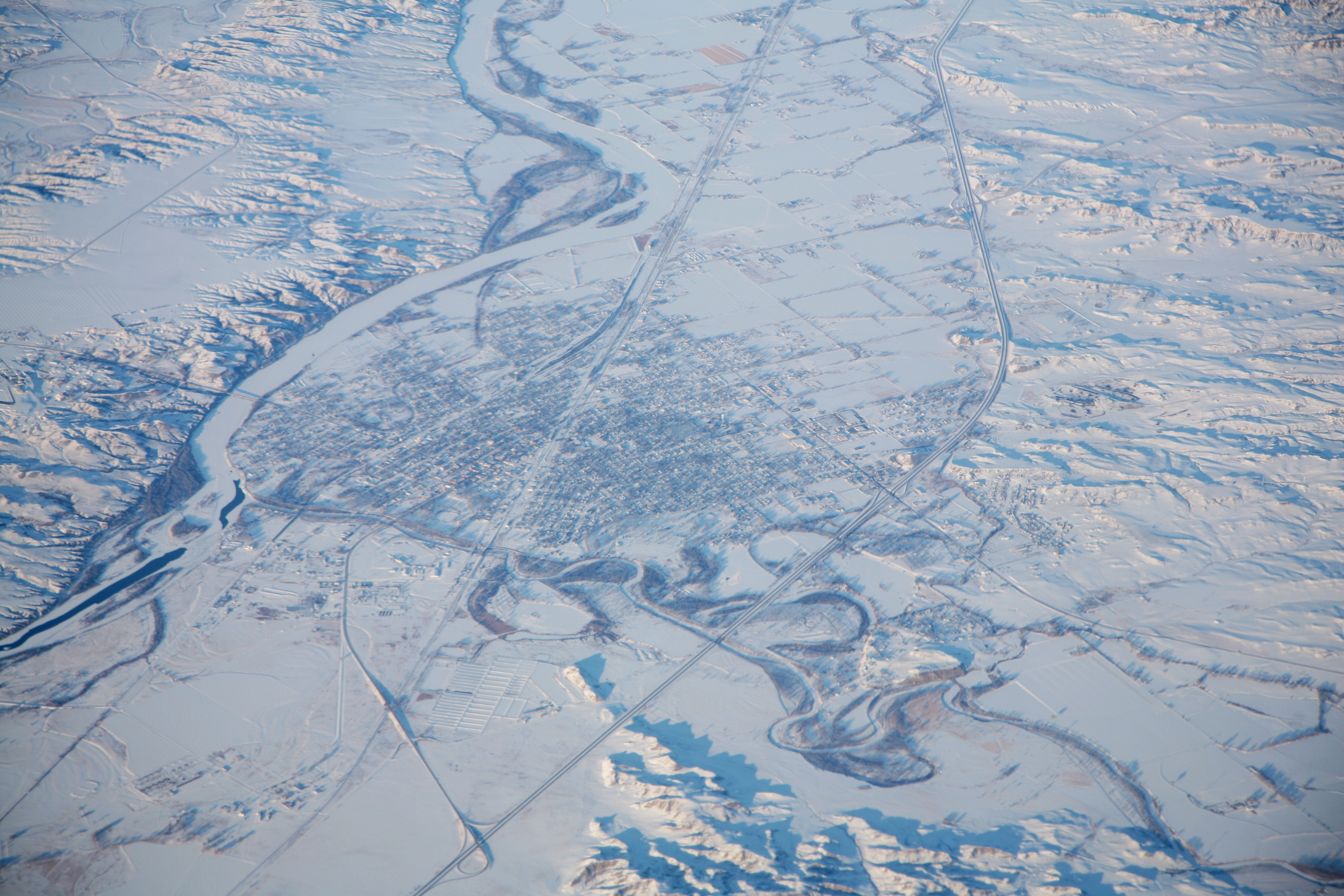
Aerial photograph of Miles City from the southwest

Miles City sits within the High Plains of the Great Plains, and is nestled between the Tongue and Yellowstone rivers. According to the United States Census Bureau, the city has a total area of 3.34 square miles (8.65 km^{2}), all land. Interstate 94 passes through the community, with access from Exits 135, 138, and 141. Montana Highway 59 runs north–south. The Tongue River flows into Yellowstone River at the town. Pirogue Island State Park is just outside of town.

=== Climate ===
Climate chart for Miles City

The city holds the record for the highest mean sea level pressure in the contiguous United States with a reading of 31.42 inHg (1064 mb) on December 24, 1983.

According to the Köppen Climate Classification system, Miles City has a cold semi-arid climate, abbreviated "BSk" on climate maps.

Climate data for Miles City, Montana (Miles City Airport), 1991–2020 normals, extremes 1937–present
Month	Jan	Feb	Mar	Apr	May	Jun	Jul	Aug	Sep	Oct	Nov	Dec	Year
Record high °F (°C)	72 (22)	73 (23)	83 (28)	92 (33)	100 (38)	111 (44)	115 (46)	110 (43)	106 (41)	95 (35)	81 (27)	70 (21)	115 (46)
Mean maximum °F (°C)	52.0 (11.1)	55.8 (13.2)	71.1 (21.7)	80.8 (27.1)	87.3 (30.7)	96.4 (35.8)	102.6 (39.2)	100.8 (38.2)	96.3 (35.7)	83.6 (28.7)	67.5 (19.7)	53.9 (12.2)	104.1 (40.1)
Mean daily maximum °F (°C)	30.1 (−1.1)	34.7 (1.5)	46.8 (8.2)	58.1 (14.5)	68.1 (20.1)	78.6 (25.9)	88.7 (31.5)	87.4 (30.8)	75.6 (24.2)	59.0 (15.0)	44.3 (6.8)	33.1 (0.6)	58.7 (14.8)
Daily mean °F (°C)	19.5 (−6.9)	23.6 (−4.7)	34.7 (1.5)	45.5 (7.5)	55.5 (13.1)	65.6 (18.7)	74.2 (23.4)	72.5 (22.5)	61.2 (16.2)	46.4 (8.0)	32.7 (0.4)	22.4 (−5.3)	46.1 (7.8)
Mean daily minimum °F (°C)	8.9 (−12.8)	12.5 (−10.8)	22.5 (−5.3)	32.9 (0.5)	42.9 (6.1)	52.5 (11.4)	59.6 (15.3)	57.6 (14.2)	46.9 (8.3)	33.8 (1.0)	21.2 (−6.0)	11.7 (−11.3)	33.6 (0.9)
Mean minimum °F (°C)	−16.9 (−27.2)	−8.7 (−22.6)	1.2 (−17.1)	18.1 (−7.7)	29.5 (−1.4)	42.3 (5.7)	50.6 (10.3)	45.9 (7.7)	32.8 (0.4)	17.7 (−7.9)	−0.3 (−17.9)	−11.3 (−24.1)	−23.8 (−31.0)
Record low °F (°C)	−37 (−38)	−37 (−38)	−31 (−35)	2 (−17)	15 (−9)	32 (0)	41 (5)	35 (2)	19 (−7)	−8 (−22)	−25 (−32)	−38 (−39)	−38 (−39)
Average precipitation inches (mm)	0.28 (7.1)	0.26 (6.6)	0.55 (14)	1.54 (39)	2.73 (69)	2.51 (64)	1.51 (38)	0.91 (23)	1.07 (27)	0.97 (25)	0.33 (8.4)	0.22 (5.6)	12.88 (327)
Average snowfall inches (cm)	5.8 (15)	3.7 (9.4)	4.3 (11)	4.1 (10)	1.4 (3.6)	0.0 (0.0)	0.0 (0.0)	0.0 (0.0)	0.3 (0.76)	1.0 (2.5)	4.5 (11)	4.4 (11)	29.5 (75)
Average precipitation days (≥ 0.01 in)	5.1	5.1	6.3	8.8	12.0	11.1	8.0	6.5	6.5	7.6	5.4	4.3	86.7
Average snowy days (≥ 0.1 in)	5.0	4.0	4.0	1.7	0.6	0.0	0.0	0.0	0.3	0.7	3.7	5.1	25.1
Average relative humidity (%)	71.7	72.4	67.5	58.4	57.5	55.2	46.8	45.4	54.4	59.5	69.4	73.0	60.9
Average dew point °F (°C)	7.9 (−13.4)	14.7 (−9.6)	22.1 (−5.5)	29.5 (−1.4)	39.6 (4.2)	48.0 (8.9)	50.2 (10.1)	47.1 (8.4)	40.1 (4.5)	32.0 (0.0)	21.4 (−5.9)	11.8 (−11.2)	30.4 (−0.9)
Source 1: National Weather Service
Source 2: NOAA (relative humidity and dew point 1961–1990, average snowfall/snowy days 1981–2010)

=== Giant snowflake ===
Guinness World Records reports that the largest natural snowflake ever measured, 15 inches (38 cm) in diameter, was recorded at Fort Keogh on January 28, 1887. However, there is no corroborating evidence to support this claim.

== Demographics ==
Historical population
Census	Pop.	Note	%±
1880	629		—
1890	956		52.0%
1900	1,938		102.7%
1910	4,697		142.4%
1920	7,937		69.0%
1930	7,175		−9.6%
1940	7,313		1.9%
1950	9,243		26.4%
1960	9,665		4.6%
1970	9,023		−6.6%
1980	9,602		6.4%
1990	8,461		−11.9%
2000	8,487		0.3%
2010	8,410		−0.9%
2020	8,354		−0.7%
U.S. Decennial Census

=== 2020 census ===
As of the 2020 census, Miles City had a population of 8,354. The median age was 39.8 years. 22.0% of residents were under the age of 18 and 20.0% of residents were 65 years of age or older. For every 100 females there were 97.5 males, and for every 100 females age 18 and over there were 95.7 males age 18 and over.

99.9% of residents lived in urban areas, while 0.1% lived in rural areas.

There were 3,629 households in Miles City, of which 26.3% had children under the age of 18 living in them. Of all households, 39.3% were married-couple households, 23.2% were households with a male householder and no spouse or partner present, and 30.6% were households with a female householder and no spouse or partner present. About 37.8% of all households were made up of individuals and 14.8% had someone living alone who was 65 years of age or older.

There were 4,079 housing units, of which 11.0% were vacant. The homeowner vacancy rate was 1.3% and the rental vacancy rate was 12.3%.

Racial composition as of the 2020 census
Race	Number	Percent
White	7,592	90.9%
Black or African American	55	0.7%
American Indian and Alaska Native	142	1.7%
Asian	48	0.6%
Native Hawaiian and Other Pacific Islander	7	0.1%
Some other race	75	0.9%
Two or more races	435	5.2%
Hispanic or Latino (of any race)	283	3.4%

=== 2010 census ===
As of the census of 2010, there were 8,410 people, 3,677 households, and 2,082 families living in the city. The population density was 2,518.0 inhabitants per square mile (972.2/km^{2}). There were 4,000 housing units at an average density of 1,197.6 per square mile (462.4/km^{2}). The racial makeup of the city was 95.3% White, 0.3% African American, 1.7% Native American, 0.4% Asian, 0.1% Pacific Islander, 0.6% from other races, and 1.6% from two or more races. Hispanic or Latino of any race were 2.4% of the population.

There were 3,677 households, of which 27.5% had children under the age of 18 living with them, 42.0% were married couples living together, 10.3% had a female householder with no husband present, 4.3% had a male householder with no wife present, and 43.4% were non-families. Of all households, 37.2% were made up of individuals, and 15% had someone living alone who was 65 years of age or older. The average household size was 2.20 and the average family size was 2.89.

The median age in the city was 40.6 years. 22.4% of residents were under the age of 18; 9.4% were between the ages of 18 and 24; 22.7% were from 25 to 44; 27.6% were from 45 to 64; and 17.8% were 65 years of age or older. The gender makeup of the city was 48.8% male and 51.2% female.

=== 2000 census ===
As of the census of 2000, there were 8,487 people, 3,528 households, and 2,194 families living in the city. The population density was 2,593.3 inhabitants per square mile (1,001.3/km^{2}). There were 3,890 housing units at an average density of 1,188.7 per square mile (459.0/km^{2}). The racial makeup of the city was 96.72% White, 0.12% African American, 1.39% Native American, 0.28% Asian, 0.05% Pacific Islander, 0.44% from other races, and 1.00% from two or more races. Hispanic or Latino of any race were 1.59% of the population.

There were 3,528 households, out of which 29.7% had children under the age of 18 living with them, 47.7% were married couples living together, 10.8% had a female householder with no husband present, and 37.8% were non-families. Of all households, 32.3% were made up of individuals, and 13.1% had someone living alone who was 65 years of age or older. The average household size was 2.31 and the average family size was 2.93.

In the city, the population was spread out, with 24.6% under the age of 18, 8.8% from 18 to 24, 25.9% from 25 to 44, 22.5% from 45 to 64, and 18.2% who were 65 years of age or older. The median age was 39 years. For every 100 females, there were 92.3 males. For every 100 females age 18 and over, there were 87.7 males.

The median income for a household in the city was $29,847, and the median income for a family was $41,190. Males had a median income of $30,123 versus $18,750 for females. The per capita income for the city was $16,449. About 9.4% of families and 14.7% of the population were below the poverty line, including 17.7% of those under age 18 and 8.5% of those age 65 or over.

== Government ==
Miles City uses a council/mayor form of government. There are four wards with two representatives from each ward. In March 2024, elected mayor John Hollowell stepped down. The council appointed Dwayne Andrews to fill the seat until the 2025 general elections. Chris "Butch" Grenz won the 2025 mayor election with 51% of the votes.

== Media ==
The Miles City Star is the town's newspaper.

Television station KYUS-TV (channel 3), licensed to Miles City, launched in 1969 and was famously noted as being the smallest network affiliate in the United States. Operating as a standalone NBC affiliate from 1969 to 1984, KYUS-TV also served as a full-power satellite of various stations in Billings from 1984 to 1995 and again from 1998 to 2024. In 2025, KYUS-TV was acquired by Montana State University and joined the Montana PBS network.

=== Radio stations ===
- KATL (AM 770) – Adult Contemporary
- KMTA (AM 1050) – Oldies
- KIKC (AM 1250) – Oldies
- KYPR (FM 90.7) – NPR station
- KYUS-FM (92.3 FM) – Adult Hits
- KIKC-FM (101.3 FM) – Country music

== Events ==
=== 1944 ice jam ===
In March 1944, an ice jam on the Yellowstone River caused flooding which reached into Miles City. After unsuccessful attempts to clear the jam using local resources, help was requested from the Army Air Corps by the Montana governor. A B-17 bomber was dispatched from nearby Rapid City, South Dakota and cleared the ice jam using 250-pound bombs.

=== Annual bucking horse sale ===
The largest event of the year, attracting about 20,000 visitors to Miles City each May since its establishment in 1951, is the Miles City Bucking Horse Sale. Miles City is the commercial hub of southeastern Montana. The sale is generally held regardless of weather.

=== Eastern Montana Fair ===
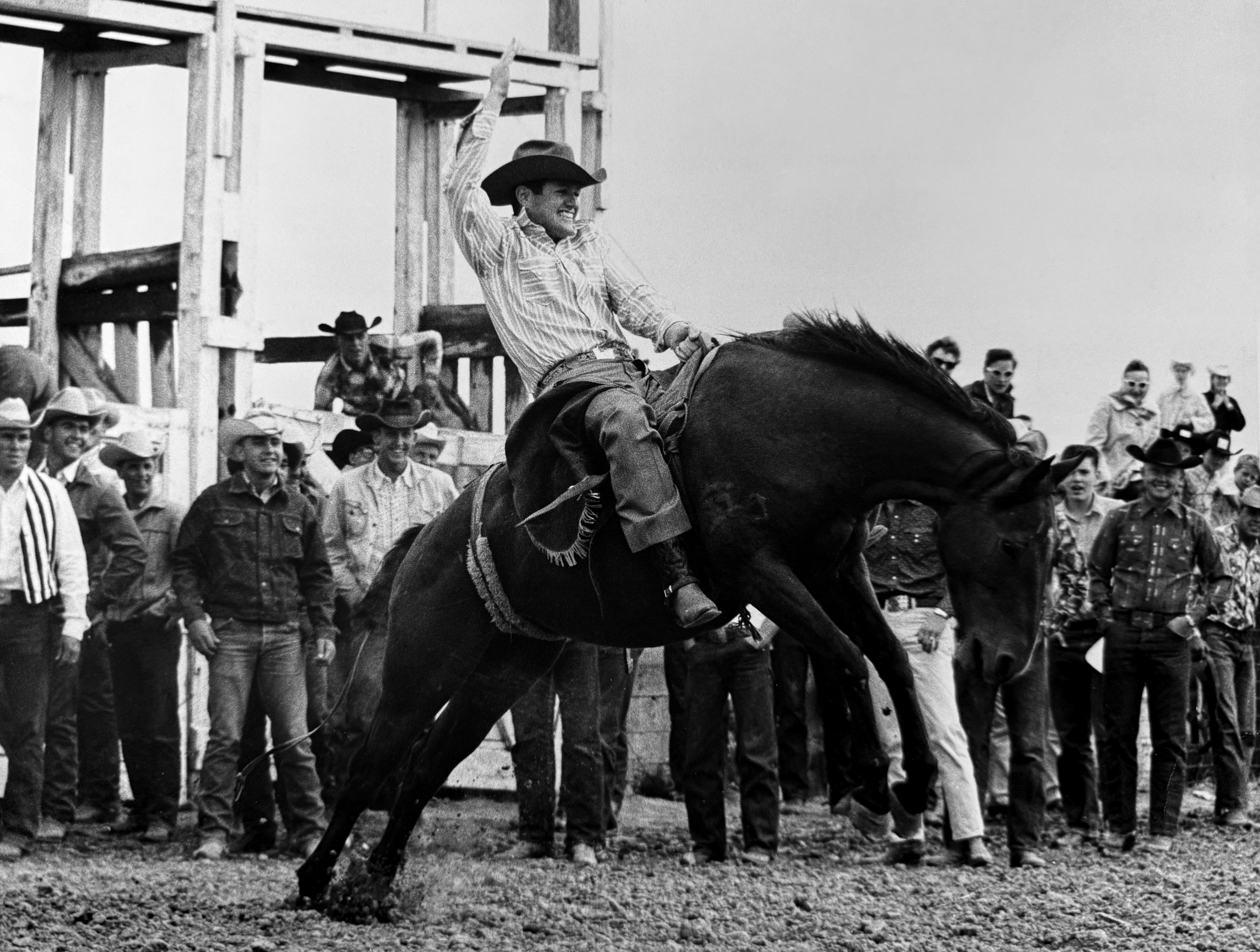
Ted Kennedy riding saddle-bronc at the Eastern Montana Fair rodeo, August 27, 1960.

The Eastern Montana Fair is held in the latter half of August at the Custer County fairgrounds, and its rodeo, demolition derby, fireworks and concerts typically attract about 17,000 attendees.

== Education ==
Miles Community College was founded in 1939. The current average student to faculty ratio is 11:1; class sizes range from 8 to 50 students; and over 85% of the students qualify for financial aid. Miles Community College also features free tutoring at the Center for Academic Success. The Judson H. Flower Jr. Library is located within the main building of Miles Community College, and is equipped with computer lab and INFOTRAC.

Custer County District High School is the only secondary school in the entire county; some students unfortunately have to drive as many as 60 miles (97 km) to attend High school. It was founded in the late 1880s as the "Miles City High School" and graduated its first class in 1893. A decade later, it was renamed to reflect its wider population as the Custer County High School in 1903 and graduated its first expanded class in 1904. Much of the current student body population's livelihood involves agriculture or ranching – entirely or in part; therefore, the local young farmers group of the National FFA Organization (Future Farmers of America) organization is very active and about 20% of the student population belong to it. The high school is famous for its musical Chorale, which travels extensively including a trip to the famous Carnegie Hall in New York City in 2005 and a trip to the national federal capital city of Washington D.C. in 2007. The Custer County high school claims that its seniors have an average ACT score of 23 and that 57% of the graduating seniors go on to complete their higher education at a 4-year university.

Miles City also has additional public schools with 4 elementary schools: Lincoln (grades 3–6), Highland Park (grades K to 2), Jefferson (K to 2), Garfield (grades 1–6). There is also a middle school at the Washington School (grades 7 and 8). Washington Middle School has many extra curricular activities, including sports, builder's club and student council. There is also one local parochial school in the county and town of the Roman Catholic Church, at Sacred Heart Parish School (pre K to grade 8).

The Miles City Public Library serves the area with a library building plus through its internet website for online access with connections to various other academic institutions and statewide public libraries.

== Places of interest ==
The highest point in the vicinity is Signal Butte (3,051 feet / 930 meters above sea level), said to have been used by Native Americans for communication, but used for decades by radio and sometimes TV antennas. Signal Butte lies at the edge of an area of badlands, a striking arid vista of eroded sedimentary soil, sporting multi-colored layers exposed by the erosion. The land contains sandstone formations in the midst of sagebrush and cedar trees growing in a soil that turns to gumbo when wet. Airport Hill is the elevated bluff of the north bank of the Yellowstone River, and Paragon Pit is a remote area of the north bank opposite of Fort Keogh frequented by teenagers over the years. 12 Mile Dam spans the Tongue River and attracts teens in the summer for water sport. Being shallow, the Tongue River is often used for tubing. The former Fort Keogh once boasted an Air Force radar station and still houses a state Extension Experiment Station. Near the highway is the site of a state fish hatchery, and nearby, a double humped butte is known locally as "Camelback". Miles City lies at the mouth of the north flowing Tongue River as it empties into the eastward flowing Yellowstone River. Both rivers are fished regularly, but yield mostly catfish, carp and a junk fish known locally as "shiners". Many local reservoirs are stocked with edible fish from the hatchery in Miles City.

=== Trinity Lutheran Church ===
There are 21 places of worship in Miles City. Trinity Lutheran Church was founded in 1906 as a preaching station with German services and served by missionaries following on the newly built Northern Pacific Railroad to hold services for German settlers in Miles City. During the anti-German hysteria of WWI, preaching in German was outlawed in Montana, including for worship at Trinity, Miles City. Now it is an English-speaking congregation in the Montana District of the Lutheran Church Missouri Synod (LCMS). They also operate Trinity Lutheran Classical School, consisting of a Christian Preschool, and Kindergarten through 8th grade. As of March 2020, they have established a YouTube channel for posting weekly services.

== Transportation ==
Intercity bus service to the city is provided by Jefferson Lines.

== Notable people ==
- Walter A. Burleigh, non-voting delegate to the United States House of Representatives from the Dakota Territory
- Noelle E. Cockett, geneticist and president of Utah State University
- Emily Danforth, author of The Miseducation of Cameron Post
- Caleb Frare, professional baseball pitcher
- Maurice Hilleman, microbiologist
- Elmer Holt, tenth governor of Montana
- George Lynch, race car driver
- Jeff Meyer, television director
- Merle Greene Robertson, art historian and scholar of the pre-Columbian Maya civilization
- Curt Schmidt, Montreal Expos pitcher
- James Arnold von der Heydt, judge of the United States District Court for the District of Alaska
- Larry R. Williams, commodity trader, author
- George Winston, pianist
- Alex Mitchell, award winning journalist from the Billings Gazette
