= National Register of Historic Places listings in Custer County, Montana =

Location of Custer County in Montana

This is a list of the National Register of Historic Places listings in Custer County, Montana. It is intended to be a complete list of the properties and districts on the National Register of Historic Places in Custer County, Montana, United States. The locations of National Register properties and districts for which the latitude and longitude coordinates are included below, may be seen in a map.

There are 18 properties and districts listed on the National Register in the county.

This National Park Service list is complete through NPS recent listings posted March 14, 2025.

== Current listings ==
| | Name on the Register | Image | Date listed | Location | City or town | Description |
|---|---|---|---|---|---|---|
| 1 | Carriage House Historic District | Carriage House Historic District | June 7, 1991 (#91000720) | Roughly bounded by Main, N. 9th, Palmer, N. 10th, Orr, and N. 13th Sts. and Montana Ave. 46°24′35″N 105°50′41″W | Miles City | |
| 2 | East Main Street Residential Historic District | East Main Street Residential Historic District | January 10, 1990 (#89002171) | 1600-2315 E. Main St. 46°24′31″N 105°50′07″W | Miles City | |
| 3 | Fort Keogh | Fort Keogh | March 8, 1978 (#78001680) | 2.5 miles (4 km) southwest of Miles City; 46°22′50″N 105°53′09″W | Miles City | |
| 4 | William Harmon House | William Harmon House | September 25, 1986 (#86002747) | 1005 Palmer; 46°24′36″N 105°50′48″W | Miles City | |
| 5 | Holy Rosary Hospital | Holy Rosary Hospital | January 15, 2009 (#08001324) | 310 N. Jordan and 2007 Clark St. 46°24′40″N 105°50′08″W | Miles City | |
| 6 | Ismay Jail | Ismay Jail | June 4, 1997 (#97000501) | Jailhouse Rd. west of its junction with East St. 46°29′53″N 104°47′34″W | Ismay | |
| 7 | Locate Creek Bridge | | March 26, 2012 (#12000170) | Mile 3 N. Locate Rd. 46°28′30″N 105°18′17″W | Miles City vicinity | part of the Montana's Steel Stringer and Steel Girder Bridges MPS |
| 8 | Main Street Historic District | Main Street Historic District | July 21, 1989 (#89000808) | Roughly Main St. from Prairie Ave. to 4th St. 46°24′21″N 105°50′52″W | Miles City | |
| 9 | Miles City Steam Laundry | Miles City Steam Laundry | July 5, 1979 (#79001400) | 800 Bridge St. 46°24′23″N 105°50′48″W | Miles City | |
| 10 | Miles City Waterworks Building and Pumping Plant Park | Miles City Waterworks Building and Pumping Plant Park | September 26, 1979 (#79003723) | West of Miles City on Pumping Plant Rd. 46°24′22″N 105°52′05″W | Miles City | |
| 11 | George M. Miles House | George M. Miles House | February 17, 1982 (#82003161) | 28 S. Lake St. 46°24′27″N 105°50′12″W | Miles City | |
| 12 | Mountain States Telephone and Telegraph Company | Mountain States Telephone and Telegraph Company | July 21, 1988 (#88001118) | 908 Main St. 46°24′26″N 105°50′44″W | Miles City | |
| 13 | Northern Pacific Railway Depot | Northern Pacific Railway Depot | April 1, 2010 (#10000132) | 500 Pacific Ave. 46°24′13″N 105°51′10″W | Miles City | |
| 14 | Olive Hotel | Olive Hotel | October 13, 1988 (#88001117) | 501 Main St. 46°24′21″N 105°51′03″W | Miles City | |
| 15 | Thomas and Beulah Shore House | Thomas and Beulah Shore House | December 18, 2003 (#03001299) | 602 S. Strevell Ave. 46°24′12″N 105°49′57″W | Miles City | |
| 16 | Walrond and Elizabeth Snell House | Walrond and Elizabeth Snell House | September 11, 2003 (#03000923) | 402 S. Lake St. 46°24′16″N 105°50′15″W | Miles City | |
| 17 | Ursuline Convent of the Sacred Heart | Ursuline Convent of the Sacred Heart | March 5, 1992 (#92000115) | 1411 Leighton Boulevard; 46°24′44″N 105°50′32″W | Miles City | |
| 18 | US Post Office-Miles City Main | US Post Office-Miles City Main | March 14, 1986 (#86000686) | 106 N. 7th St. 46°24′28″N 105°50′58″W | Miles City | |

== See also ==
- List of National Historic Landmarks in Montana
- National Register of Historic Places listings in Montana
