= Brynjulf =

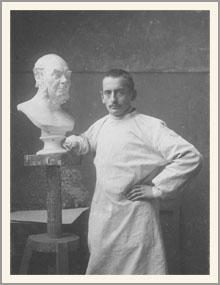
Norwegian Sculptor Brynjulf Bergslien

Brynjulf is a given name. Notable people with the name include:

- Brynjulf Bjarme (1828–1906), Norwegian playwright and theater director
- Brynjulf Blix (born 1951), Norwegian pianist
- Brynjulf Bull (1906–1993), Norwegian lawyer, Supreme Court advocate, and politician
- Brynjulf Rivenes, Norwegian-American architect
