= Merrill Avenue Historic District =

Merrill Avenue Historic District may refer to:

- Merrill Avenue Historic District (Glendive, Montana), listed on the National Register of Historic Places (NRHP) in Dawson County
- Merrill Avenue Historic District (Beloit, Wisconsin), listed on the NRHP in Rock County
