= Olive Hotel =

- U.S. National Register of Historic Places
- U.S. Historic district – Contributing property
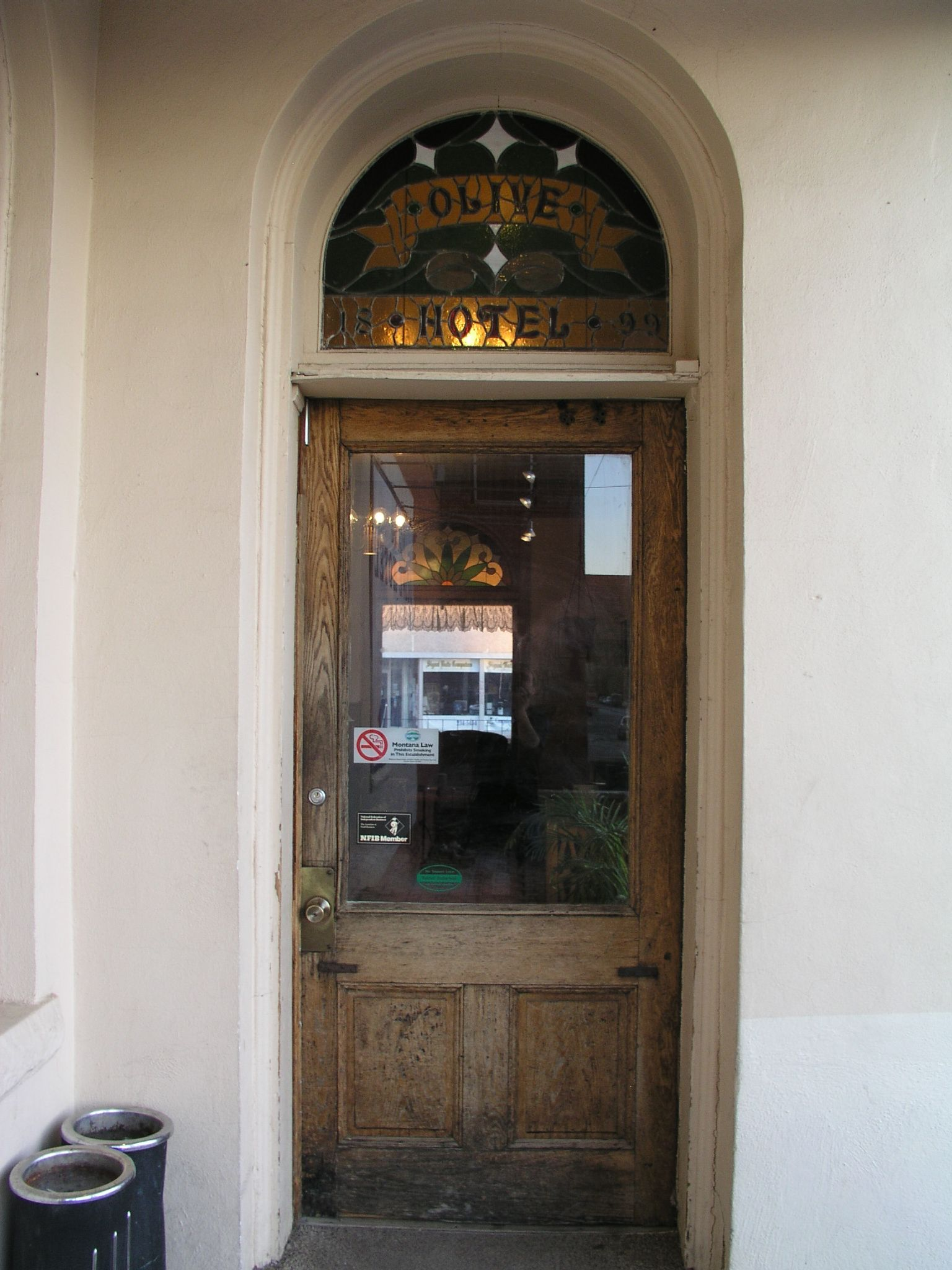
- Entrance to the Olive Hotel

- Location within Montana Location within the United States
- Location: 501 Main St., Miles City, Montana
- Coordinates: 46°24′21″N 105°51′3″W
- Area: less than one acre
- Built: 1898
- Architect: Brynjulf Rivenes
- Architectural style: Late 19th and Early 20th Century American Movements, Commercial style
- Part of: Main Street Historic District. (ID89000808)
- NRHP reference No.: 88001117

Significant dates
- Added to NRHP: October 13, 1988
- Designated CP: July 21, 1989

The Olive Hotel is a National Registered Historic Place located in Miles City, Montana. It was added to the Register on October 13, 1988.

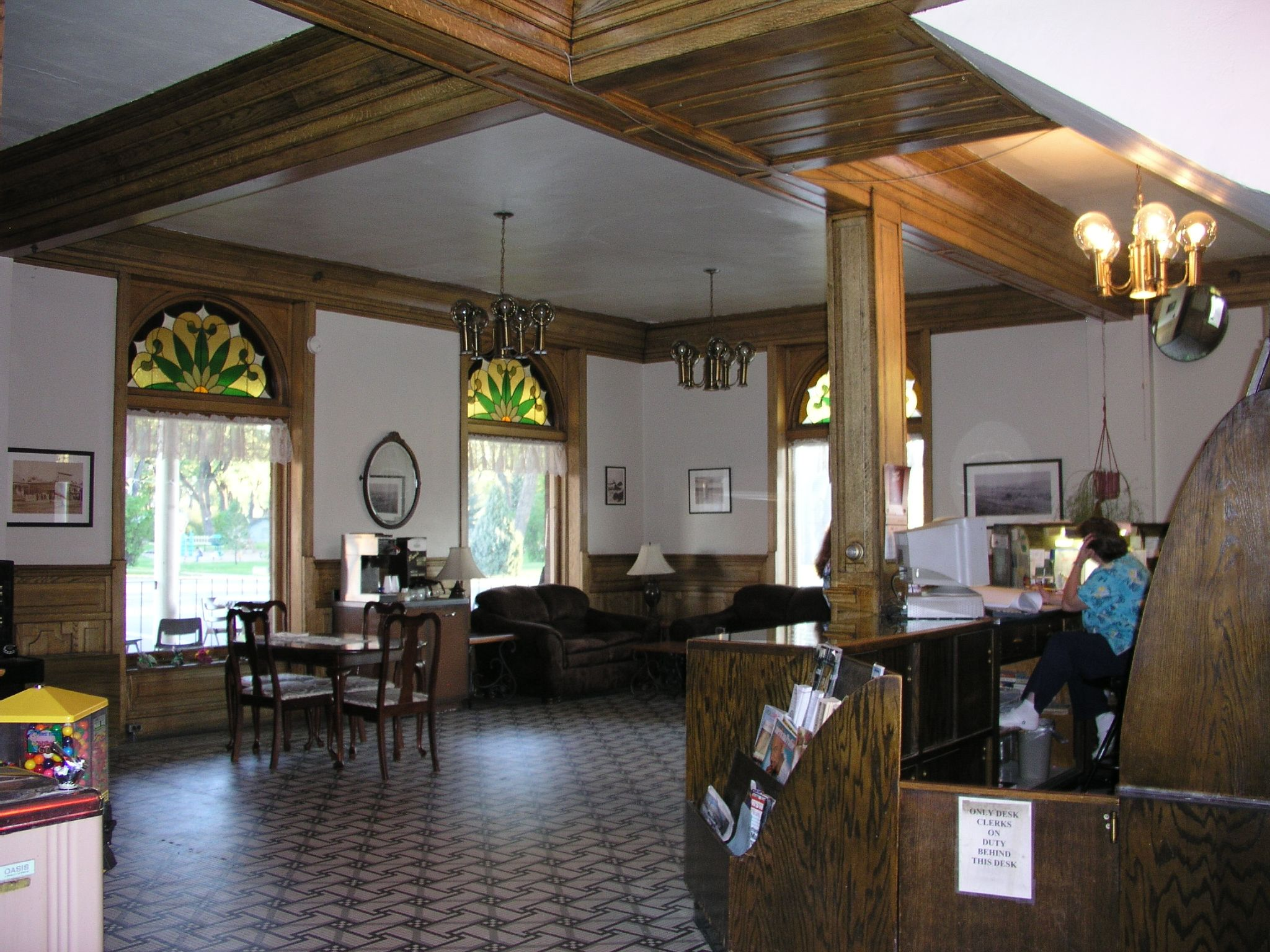
Lobby

The hotel was built in 1898–1899, and it was enlarged in 1908 by a three-story addition at the rear, plus by a new entry and redecorated lobby at the front. It has two poured concrete garages across the alley to the rear, built in 1908 and 1912, which are contributing buildings in the listing.

It is a contributing property in the Main Street Historic District, NRHP-listed in 1989. The NRHP nomination document for that district categorized it as a Renaissance Revival-style building.
