= East Main Street Residential Historic District (Miles City, Montana) =

Historic district in Montana, United States

- U.S. National Register of Historic Places
- U.S. Historic district
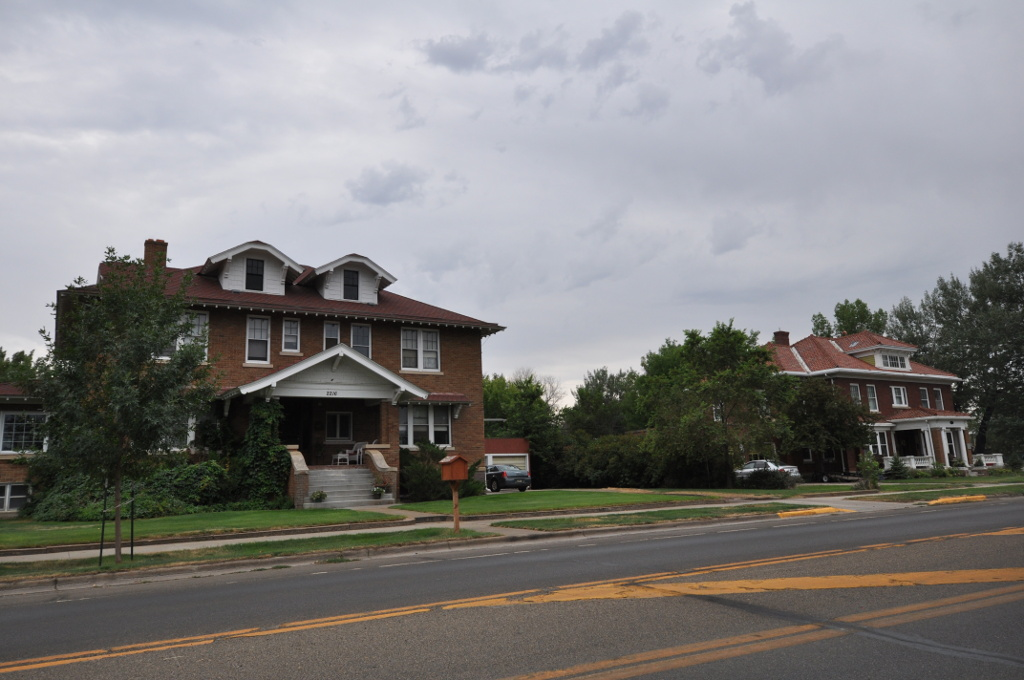

- Location within Montana Location within the United States
- Location: 1600-2315 E. Main St., Miles City, Montana
- Coordinates: 46°24′31″N 105°50′7″W
- Area: 18 acres (7.3 ha)
- Built: 1908
- Architect: Multiple
- Architectural style: Late 19th and Early 20th Century American Movements, Late 19th and 20th Century Revivals, Late Victorian
- NRHP reference No.: 89002171
- Added to NRHP: January 10, 1990

The East Main Street Residential Historic District in Miles City, Montana, including 1600-2315 E. Main St., is a historic district that is listed on the National Register of Historic Places.

Its significance dates to 1908. The district includes Late 19th and Early 20th Century American Movements architecture, Late 19th and 20th Century Revivals architecture, and Late Victorian architecture in 42 contributing buildings over 18 acres (7.3 ha).

Contributing properties in the district include:

- 2008 Main Street - Two-story house with Queen Anne and Colonial Revival design elements, home of Milwaukee Railroad conductor Newman Fuller and family during 1913-1920
- Anderson Bungalow (2119 Main Street) - 1916-built by carpenter Ernest Anderson
- Coleman Residence (2116 Main) - Foursquare home of Irish immigrant James Coleman, saloon manager and owner, and co-founder of Miles City Chamber of Commerce
- Foster House (1912 Main) - American foursquare, built during 1910–14, designed by architect Brynjulf Rivenes; house was included in 1911 promotional book, Seeing Miles City.
- Dr. Gray Residence (2019 Main)
- Harry J. Horton Residence (1918 Main)
- Kelly Residence (7 N. Cottage Grove)
- Ed and Doris Love House (2315 Main St.)
- Lukes / Love House (2302 Main St.) - built 1911
- Pope House (1906 Main St.)
- Rinehart House (1917 Main St.) - built in 1913 for dentist Dr. Curtis N. Rinehart
- Dr. A.J. Schrumpf Residence (2003 Main St.)
- Stacy Residence (2206 Main St.)

The district was listed on the National Register in 1990.

== See also ==
- Main Street Historic District (Miles City, Montana)
