= Sacred Heart Church (Glendive, Montana) =

Historic church in Montana, United States

- U.S. National Register of Historic Places
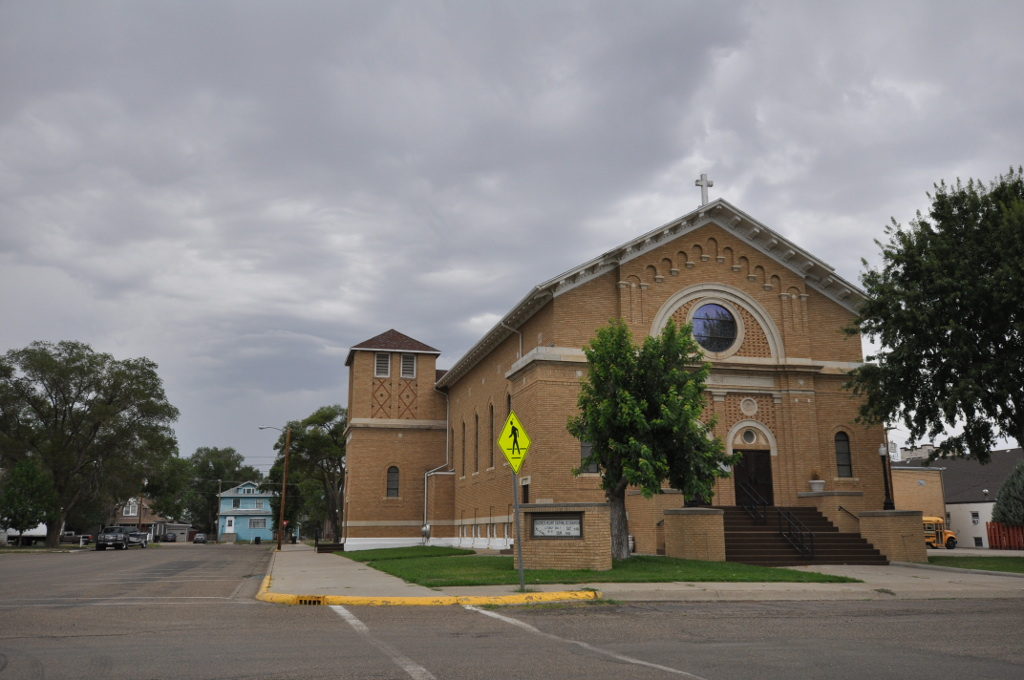

- Location within Montana Location within the United States
- Location: 316 W. Benham, Glendive, Montana
- Coordinates: 47°6′28″N 104°42′51″W
- Area: less than one acre
- Built: 1924-26
- Built by: John Holm
- Architect: Brynjulf Rivenes
- Architectural style: Romanesque, Early Italian Christian
- MPS: Glendive MRA
- NRHP reference No.: 87002504
- Added to NRHP: February 3, 1988

The Sacred Heart Church at 316 W. Benham in Glendive, Montana is a Catholic church which was built during 1924–26. It was listed on the National Register of Historic Places in 1988.

The architect was Montana architect Brynjulf Rivenes.

The church was built to serve the Catholic community in Glendive which had outgrown its first church, the St. Julianna Catholic Church established in 1886 in the former Congregational Church building at Power and Sargent Street on the east side. Property at the corner of Meade and Benham, on the west side of Glendive, was bought for $4,500; the church was built for $50,000 and a rectory (demolished in 1970) was built for $7,500. The church had a $5,000 organ installed in about 1927. The church's interior was remodeled extensively in 1973–74.

It was listed on the National Register along with several other Glendive properties covered in a 1987 study.
