= Glendive station =

Montana train station

Glendive, MT
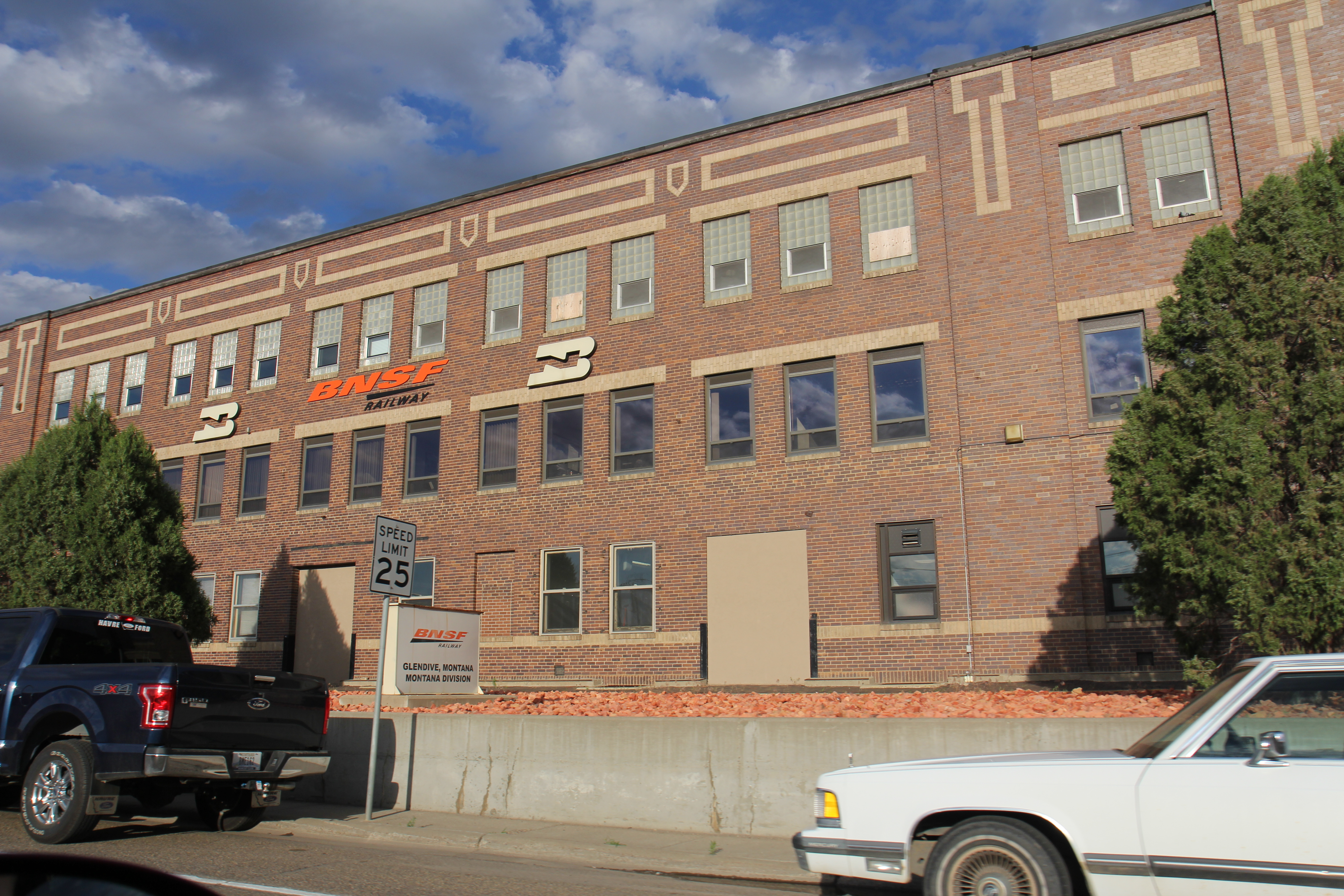
- Glendive Depot in 2016, used as offices by BNSF

General information
- Location: 310 North Merrill Avenue; Glendive, Montana 59330; United States
- Coordinates: 47.1064°N 104.7110°W
- System: Inter-city rail

History
- Opened: 1882 (1st depot); December 20, 1922 (2nd, current)
- Closed: October 1979

Former services
Preceding station	Amtrak	Following station
Miles City toward Seattle	North Coast Hiawatha	Dickinson toward Chicago
Preceding station	Northern Pacific Railway	Following station
Fallon toward Seattle or Tacoma	Main Line	Wibaux toward St. Paul
Location

Glendive Depot is an office building and former train station in Glendive, Montana. The Northern Pacific Railway established the town in 1881 and opened the first depot in 1882. The present depot building was built in 1922 and is part of the Merrill Avenue Historic District.

Passenger rail service to Glendive ended in 1979 when budget cuts forced Amtrak to discontinue the North Coast Hiawatha. As of 2022, the depot remains in use as a regional office for the BNSF Railway, while rail advocates continue to call for the restoration of train service.

== History ==
Extending west from Bismarck, North Dakota, the main line of the Northern Pacific Railway (NP) reached the Yellowstone River in 1881. The town of Glendive was built at this junction, and consequently it became the headquarters of the railroad's Yellowstone Division.

The first depot was a single-story wood-frame structure built in 1882. A second story was later added to house the offices of the Yellowstone Division. While the building became overcrowded and in need of replacement by the 1910s, World War I delayed any action. The wooden depot eventually burned down and the railroad moved into temporary offices elsewhere in the city.

On December 20, 1922, the Northern Pacific inaugurated the new Glendive Depot. The three-story "fire-proof" brick and concrete building was designed by NP staff architect O. M. Rognan and constructed by the Winston-Grant Company, with George Ready as project superintendent and R. A. Shellgren as construction engineer. The occasion was celebrated with an elaborate fruitcake in the shape of the new depot decorated by Fred Kaul, master baker of the Northern Pacific's dining car services.

In 1970 the Northern Pacific merged with the Chicago, Burlington and Quincy Railroad, Great Northern Railway, and Spokane, Portland and Seattle Railway, forming the Burlington Northern Railroad. In 1996 the Burlington Northern Railroad was merged into the BNSF Railway, which remains the owner of the depot as of 2022.

In 1988 the depot was listed on the National Register of Historic Places as a primary contributing property to the Merrill Avenue Historic District.

=== Passenger service ===
The first passenger train timetable to include Glendive was issued in June 1882. In August 1883 the Northern Pacific completed its transcontinental line at a site near Gold Creek.

In 1900 the Northern Pacific launched the North Coast Limited, an express train between Chicago and both Seattle and Portland that stopped at Glendive Depot. The Alaskan ran over the same route but on a slower schedule, making more stops. In 1952 the Alaskan was replaced by the Mainstreeter.

Amtrak took over most inter-city passenger rail in the United States on May 1, 1971, including the Burlington Northern routes. The North Coast Limited and Mainstreeter were discontinued. Glendive was left with no train service until pressure led by Senator Mike Mansfield resulted in Amtrak launching the North Coast Hiawatha in June. Though Amtrak now handled passenger rail through Glendive, Burlington Northern retained ownership of the depot and continued using the office space.

In October 1979 Amtrak discontinued the North Coast Hiawatha due to budget cuts, severing Glendive and all of southern Montana from the national rail network. This left the Empire Builder as the only passenger rail service in the state, running on the former Great Northern Railway line.

In 2020 a group of Montana counties formed the Big Sky Passenger Rail Authority with the goal of restoring service in southern Montana through Glendive. In 2021 the authority played a role in securing language in the Infrastructure Investment and Jobs Act requiring USDOT to study restoration of the North Coast Hiawatha. The study must be completed by 2023.

== Description ==
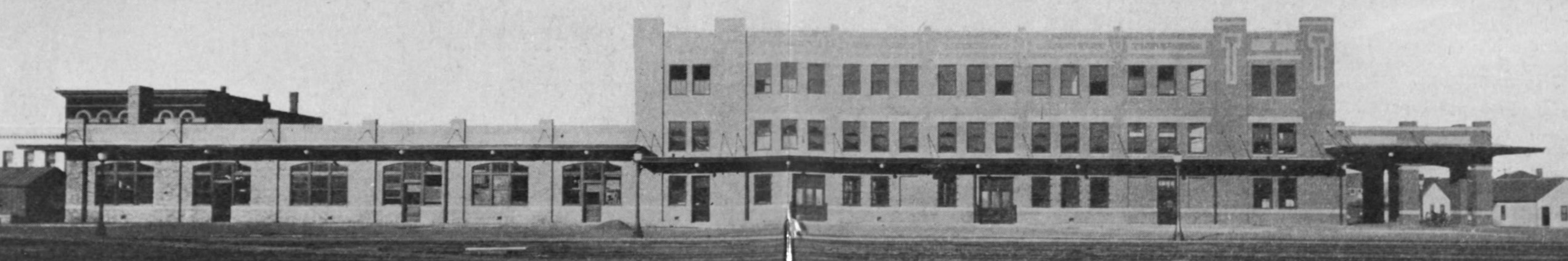
The second and current depot building as seen when completed in 1922.

When built in 1922, the depot building was said to have been "modern" and "without superfluous frills." It has been categorize under the Prairie School style. The exterior is red brick with white brick trim, both pressed by the Hebron Brick Company of North Dakota. The ground floor was intended as a passenger station while the top two floors were built as company offices. There is a portico on the north side that was used to store carts for baggage and mail.

Amenities included a waiting room, ticket room, smoking room, lunch room, and baggage room. The interior featured Ludowic red promenade tile flooring and oak woodwork. The public restrooms were finished in glazed white tile and Tennessee marble.

The station had three brick platforms lined with twenty-six electric lamp posts. One platform was 380 feet (120 m) long while the other two measured 1,000 feet (300 m). These have since been removed.
