= First Methodist Episcopal Church and Parsonage (Glendive, Montana) =

Historic church in Montana, United States

- U.S. National Register of Historic Places
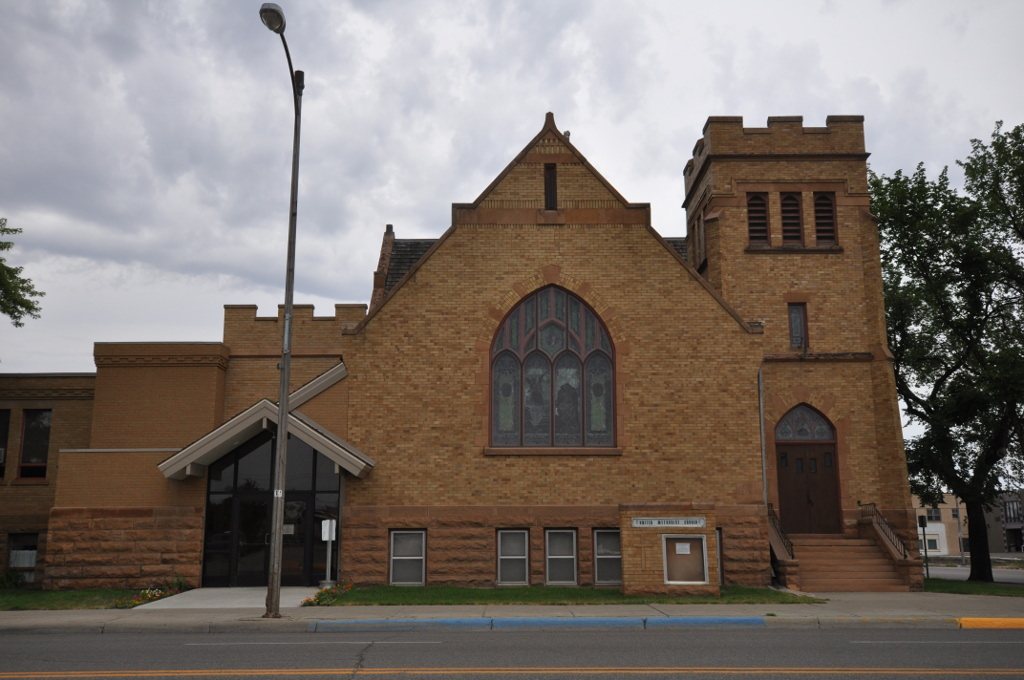

- Location within Montana Location within the United States
- Location: 209 N. Kendrick, Glendive, Montana
- Coordinates: 47°6′22″N 104°42′49″W
- Area: less than one acre
- Built: 1909
- Architect: Brynjulf Rivenes
- Architectural style: Bungalow/craftsman, Late Gothic Revival, English Gothic Style
- MPS: Glendive MRA
- NRHP reference No.: 87002513
- Added to NRHP: February 3, 1988

The First Methodist Episcopal Church and Parsonage, now the United Methodist Church in Glendive, Montana, was listed on the National Register of Historic Places in 1988. The church building was built in 1909; the parsonage in 1913. They are located at 209 N. Kendrick. The parsonage is a Bungalow/Craftsman architecture house. The church is Late Gothic Revival, or English Gothic architecture in style, designed by Miles City-based architect Brynjulf Rivenes.

The church was founded in 1882 and its first church building was built in 1883.

The property was listed on the National Register as part of a study of multiple historic resources in Glendive which also listed several others.
