= Miles City station =

Railway station in Miles City, Montana

Miles City, MT
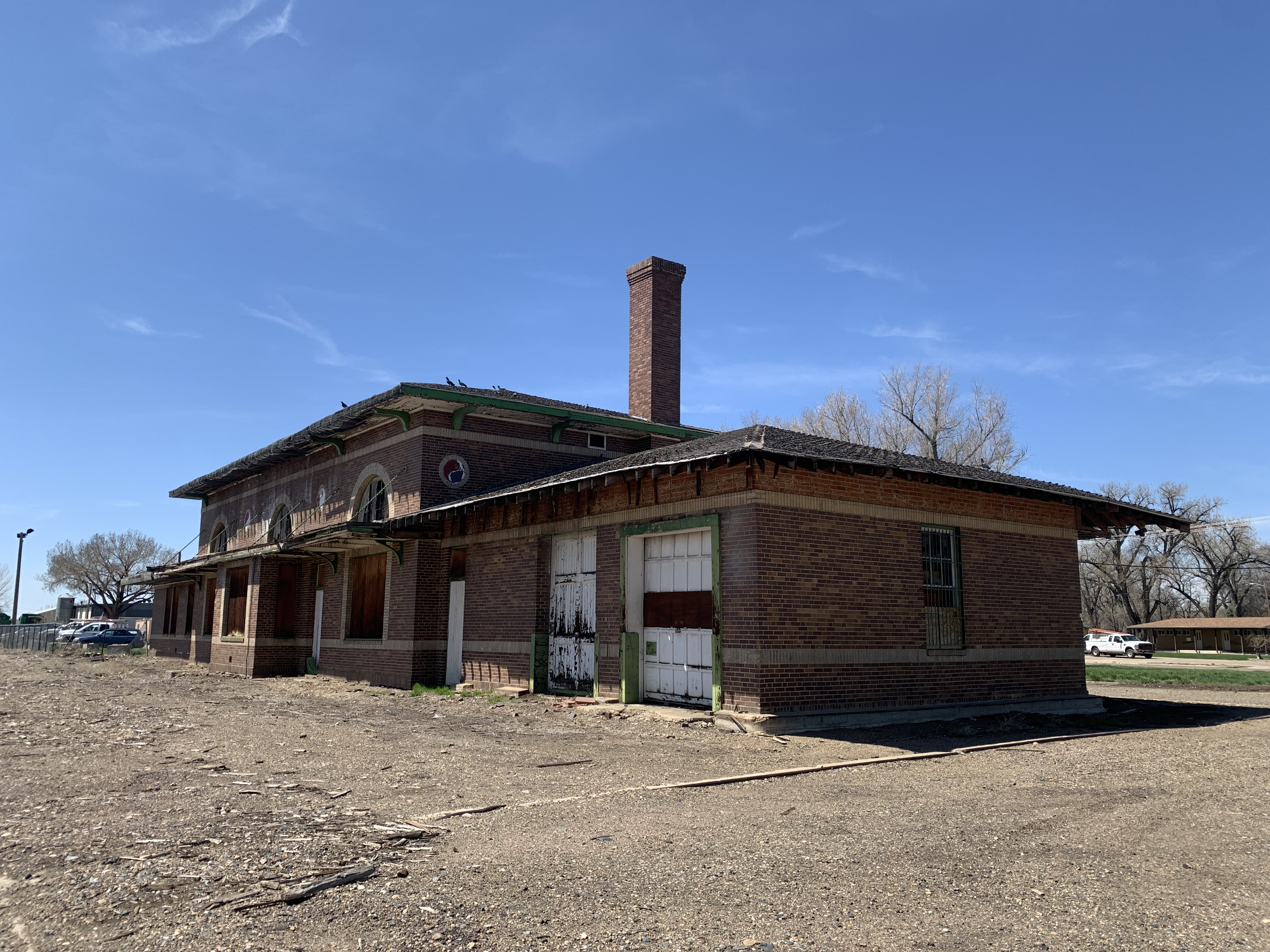
- Miles City station in 2022

General information
- Location: 500 Pacific Avenue, Miles City, Montana 59301
- System: inter-city rail station
- Platforms: 1 side platform (removed)
- Tracks: 2

History
- Opened: 1924
- Closed: 1979

Former services
Preceding station	Amtrak	Following station
Forsyth toward Seattle	North Coast Hiawatha	Glendive toward Chicago
Preceding station	Northern Pacific Railway	Following station
Hathaway toward Seattle or Tacoma	Main Line	Benz toward St. Paul
Preceding station	Milwaukee Road	Following station
Rosebud toward Seattle or Tacoma	Main Line	Kinsey toward Chicago
- Northern Pacific Railway Depot
- U.S. National Register of Historic Places
- Location: 500 Pacific Ave, Miles City, Montana
- Coordinates: 46.4031°N 105.84876°W
- Area: 1.4 acres (0.57 ha)
- Built: 1924
- Built by: Winston-Grant Construction
- Architectural style: Renaissance
- NRHP reference No.: 10000132
- Added to NRHP: April 1, 2010
Location

The Miles City station of Miles City, Montana is located at 500 Pacific Avenue and was built in 1924. It was a replacement commissioned to be designed by the Northern Pacific Railway in 1922 despite economic downturn that had reduced prosperity in Miles City. The station served Miles City for 50 years. The station also served Amtrak's North Coast Hiawatha from 1971 until 1979.

The station was listed on the National Register of Historic Places in 2010, as the Northern Pacific Railway Depot.
