= Merrill Avenue Historic District (Glendive, Montana) =

Historic district in Montana, United States

- U.S. National Register of Historic Places
- U.S. Historic district
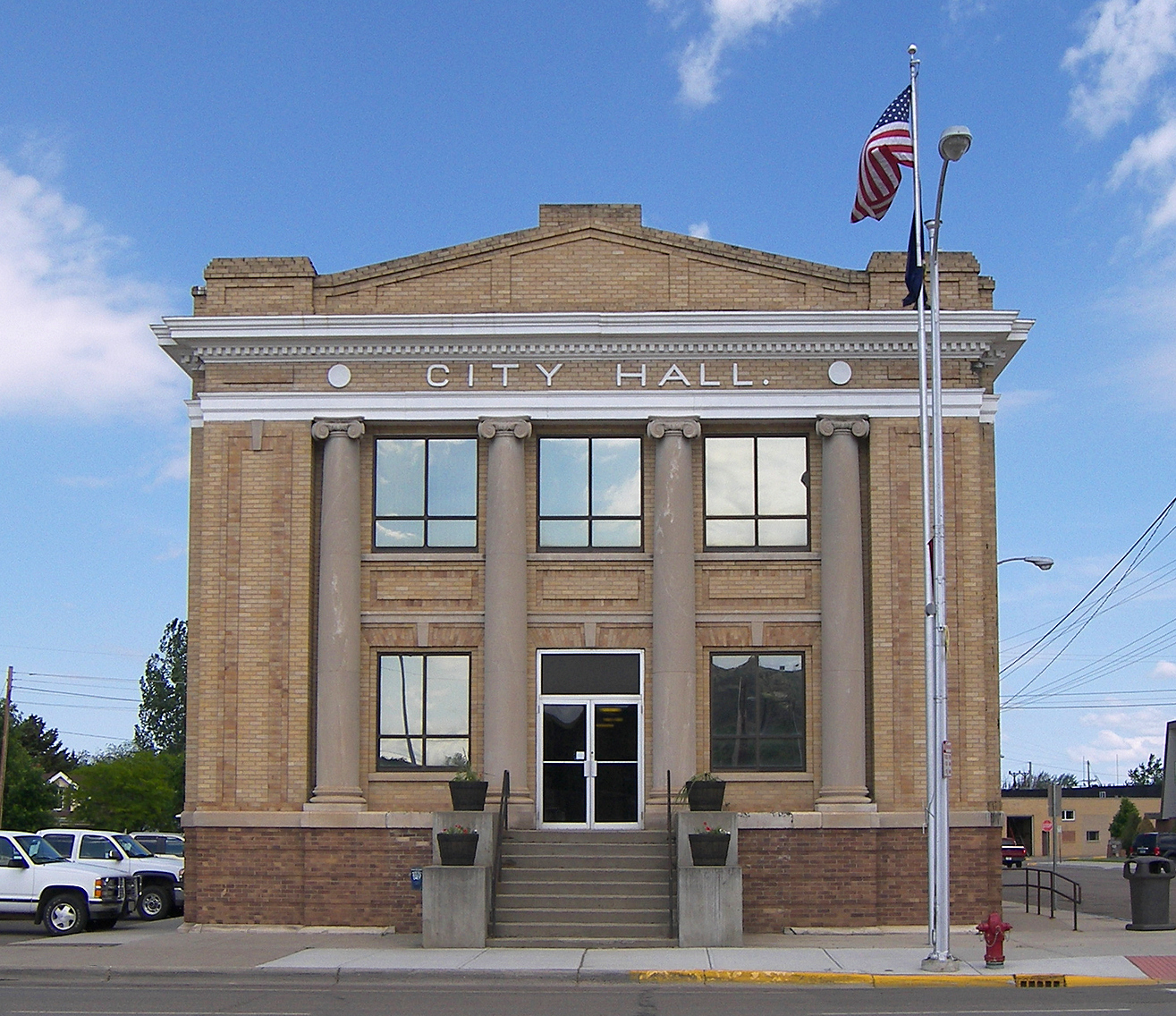
- Glendive City Hall in 2008

- Location within Montana Location within the United States
- Location: Western side of Merrill Ave. between S. Douglas St. and W. Clement St. and the eastern side of Merrill Ave. between W. Towne and W. Clement, Glendive, Montana
- Coordinates: 47.105°N 104.7125°W
- Area: 2.5 acres (1.0 ha)
- Architect: Brynjulf Rivenes
- Architectural style: Classical Revival, Late Gothic Revival, Italianate
- MPS: Glendive MRA
- NRHP reference No.: 87002508
- Added to NRHP: February 3, 1988

The Merrill Avenue Historic District in Glendive, Montana is a historic district which was listed on the National Register of Historic Places in 1988. The district includes 28 contributing buildings and a contributing site on 2.5 acres (1.0 ha). It includes Classical Revival, Late Gothic Revival, and Italianate architecture.

== History ==
The district includes several works by architect Brynjulf Rivenes:

- Glendive City Hall, 300 S Merrill Avenue (1914)
- Douglas & Mead Building, 119-121 N Merrill Avenue (1915 remodeling),
- Krug Building, 202 South Merrill Avenue (ca. 1908)
- Rivenes-Wester Building, 206 South Merrill Avenue (1905)
- First National Bank Building 200 South Kendrick (1903)
- Dion Brothers Building, 106-108 South Merrill Avenue (1910s remodeling)

The district's buildings were associated with a number of notable residents including Charles Krug, Henry Dion, J. H. Miskimen, Frank Kinney, A. S. Foss, Henry Douglas, David Mead, G. D. Hollecker, W. F. Jordan, C. A. Thurston, and Thomas Hogan.

They were mostly ranchers and businessmen, who financed the construction of these buildings and most served as civic leaders when the town experienced its period of greatest prominence and growth from 1900-1920. These early community boosters generally opted for a slow, steady growth for which the town and the area have been historically known. Charles Krug, the town's alleged first millionaire, is credited with providing the town with the resources necessary to survive the 1920s with no bank failures, a time when over half of the banks in Montana closed their doors. They built a town with the basically conservative commercial and residential designs that reflected their conservative beliefs.

— William A. Babcock, Jr.,

== Gallery ==
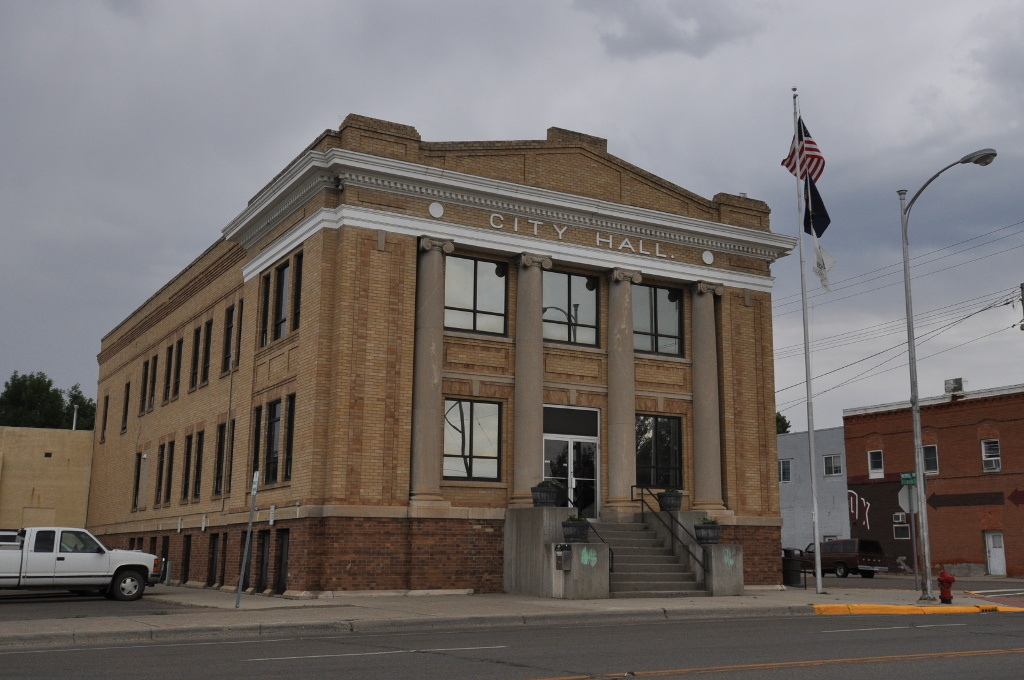
Glendive City Hall

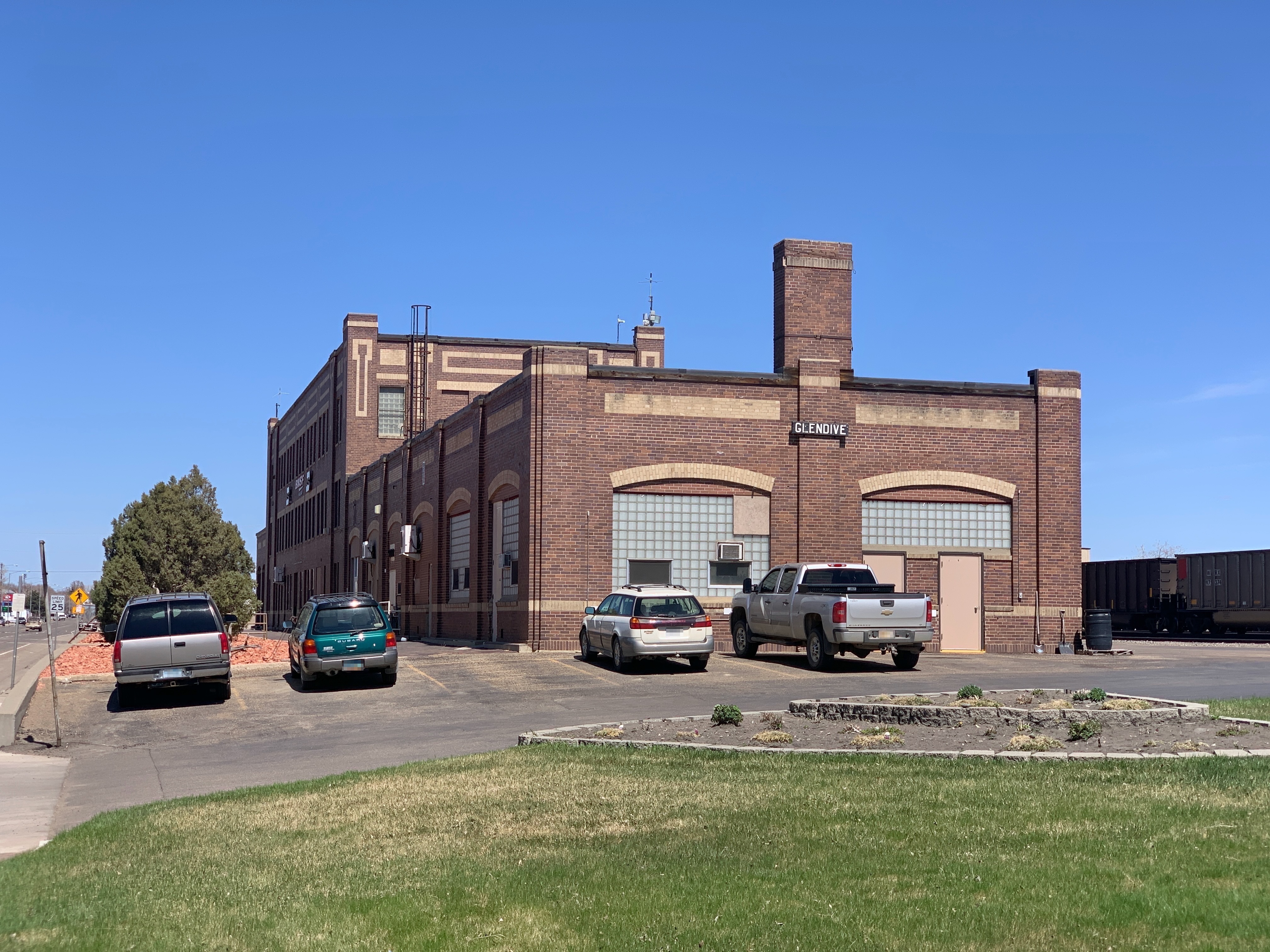
Glendive Depot

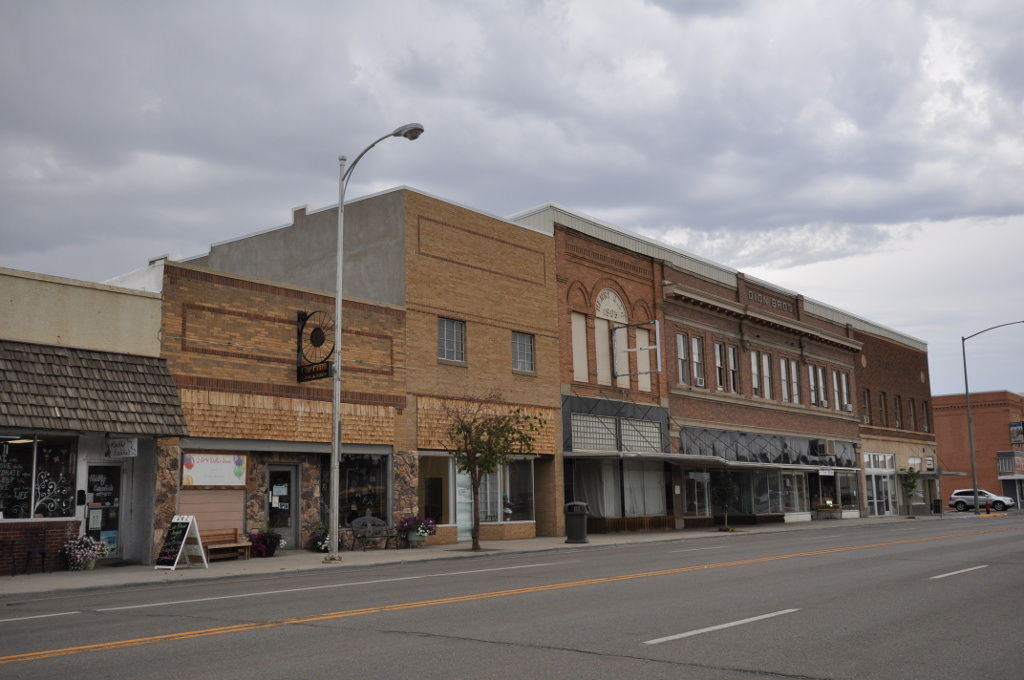
Properties on Merrill Avenue at Bell Street

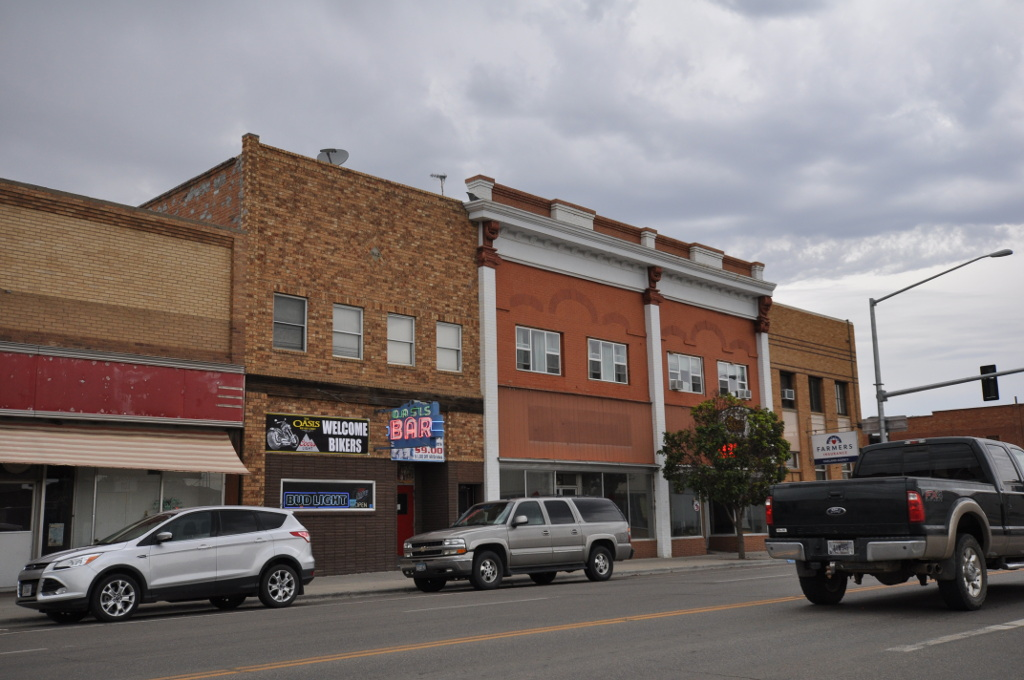
Properties on Merrill Avenue at Towne Street

== Other sources ==
- Guide to Historic Glendive (Montana Historical Society. 1998) ISBN 9780917298585
