= Miles City Steam Laundry =

- U.S. National Register of Historic Places
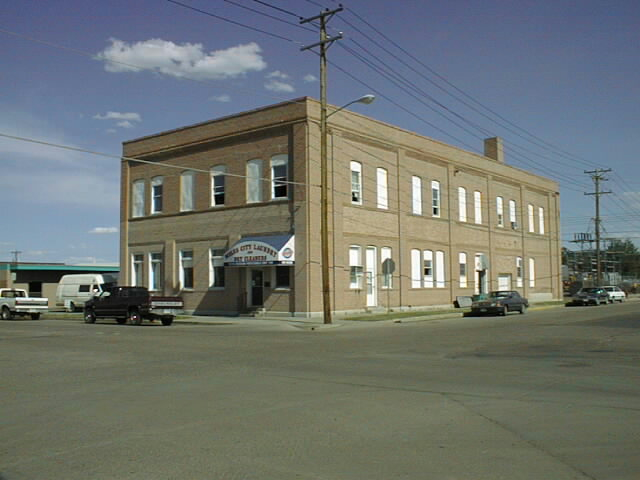

- Location within Montana Location within the United States
- Location: 800 Bridge St.
- Coordinates: 46°24′33″N 105°50′48″W
- Built: 1908, c.1910-12
- Architect: Stockhill, George
- NRHP reference No.: 79001400
- Added to NRHP: July 5, 1979

The Miles City Steam Laundry is a historic building in Miles City, Montana. It was added to the National Register of Historic Places on July 5, 1979. It was owned by Cyrus Hugg Mott. The building was demolished in 2011.

It was built in 1908 as a one-story building; a second floor was added c.1910-12; one-story additions were added later. It was a 51 by 116 feet (16 m × 35 m)-plan building.
