= George M. Miles House =

Historic house in Montana, United States

- U.S. National Register of Historic Places
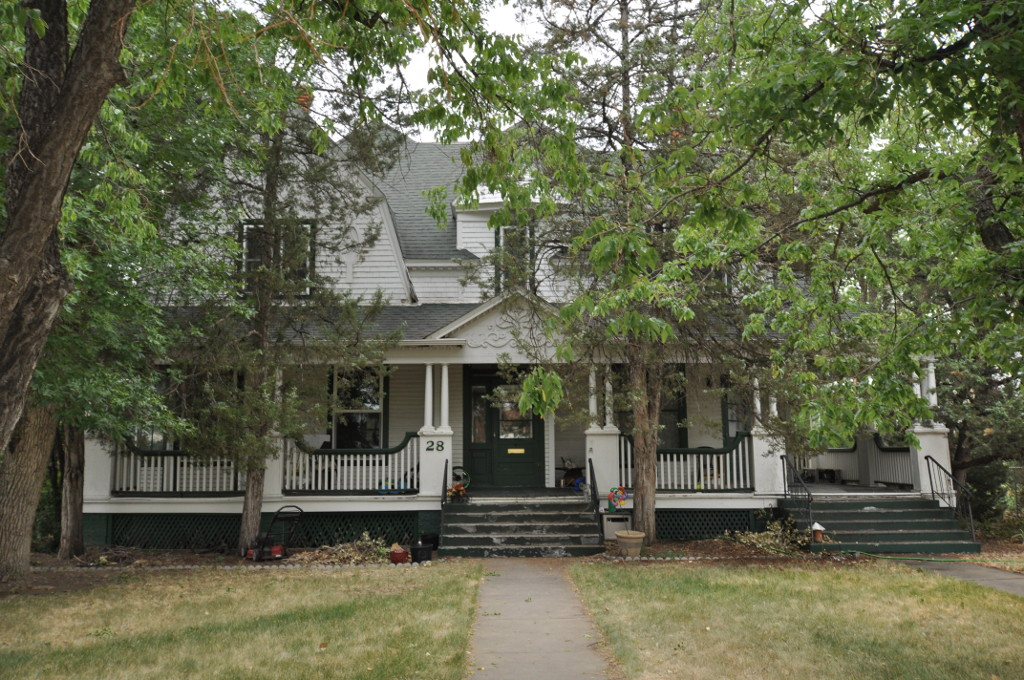

- Location within Montana Location within the United States
- Location: 28 S. Lake St., Miles City, Montana
- Coordinates: 46°24′27″N 105°50′12″W
- Area: less than one acre
- Built: 1899
- Architectural style: Queen Anne
- NRHP reference No.: 82003161
- Added to NRHP: February 17, 1982

The George M. Miles House is a site on the National Register of Historic Places located in Miles City, Montana, United States. It was added to the Register on February 17, 1982. George M. Miles was the nephew of General Nelson A. Miles. He was a bank president and owner of a local hardware store.

It is a two-story irregularly massed Queen Anne-style house. In 1980 juniper trees obscured the front of the house.

It was home of George M. Miles from 1899 to 1913. Miles was involved in various businesses, including serving as president of the First National Bank from 1907 to 1929.
