= Thomas and Beulah Shore House =

Historic house in Montana, United States

- U.S. National Register of Historic Places
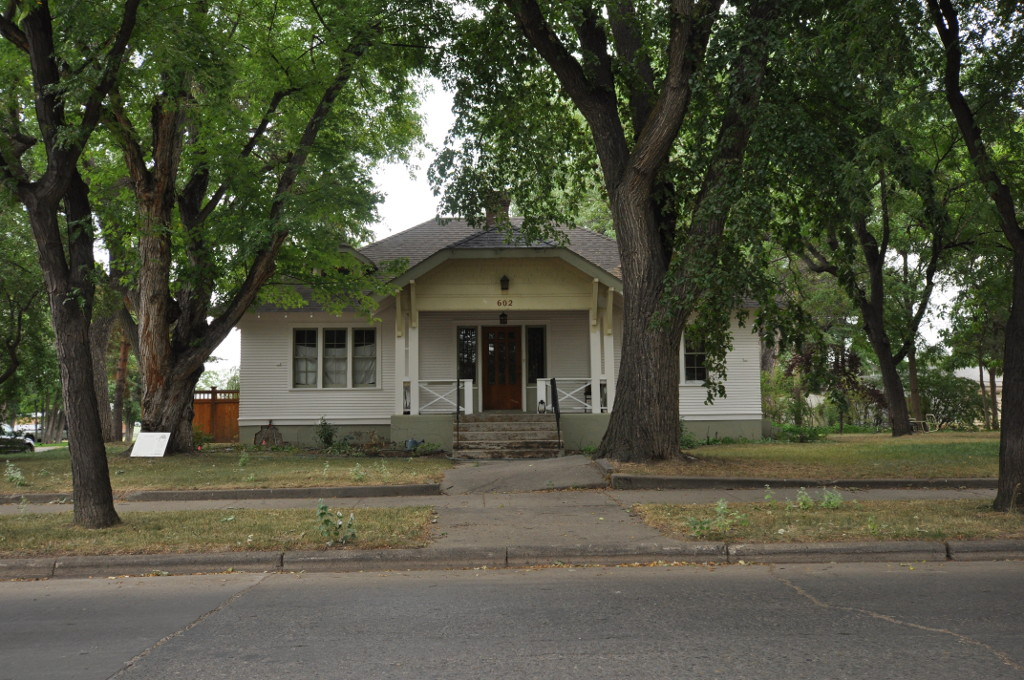

- Location within Montana Location within the United States
- Location: 602 S. Strevell Ave., Miles City, Montana
- Coordinates: 46°24′12″N 105°49′57″W
- Area: less than one acre
- Built: 1914
- Architect: Beulah Shore; Fred Clearman & Sons
- Architectural style: American Movement: Bungalow/Craftsman
- NRHP reference No.: 03001299
- Added to NRHP: December 18, 2003

The Thomas and Beulah Shore House is a site on the National Register of Historic Places located in Miles City, Montana, United States. It was added to the Register on December 18, 2003.

It was designed at least in part by Beulah Shore, who worked with contractor Fred Clearman & Sons in designing and constructing the home.
