= Brynjulf Rivenes =

Norwegian-American architect

- Born: July 4, 1874; Norway
- Died: December 21, 1929 (aged 55); Minneapolis, Minnesota, US
- Occupation: Architect

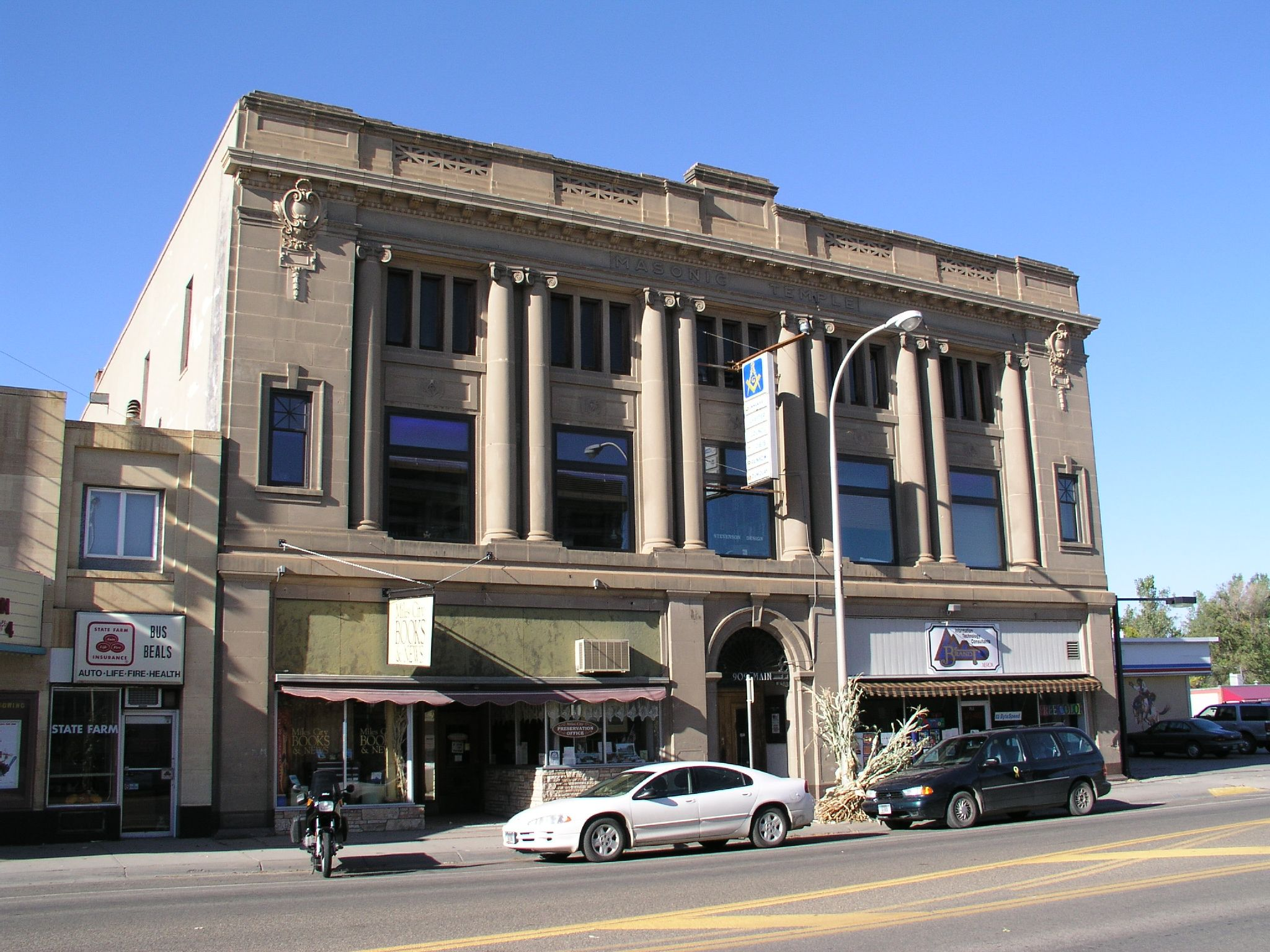
Masonic Temple, Miles City, 1912.

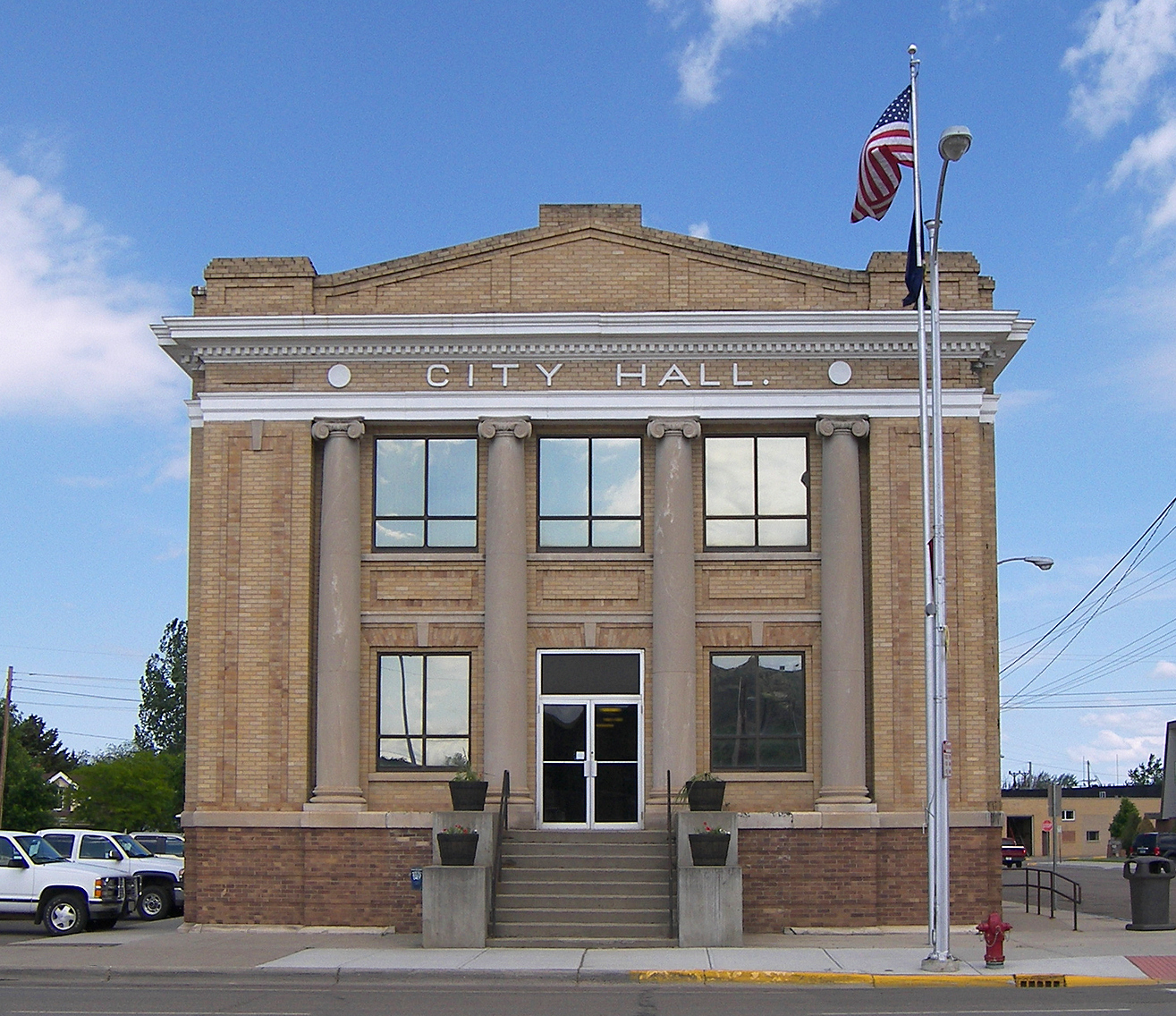
Glendive City Hall, Glendive, 1914.

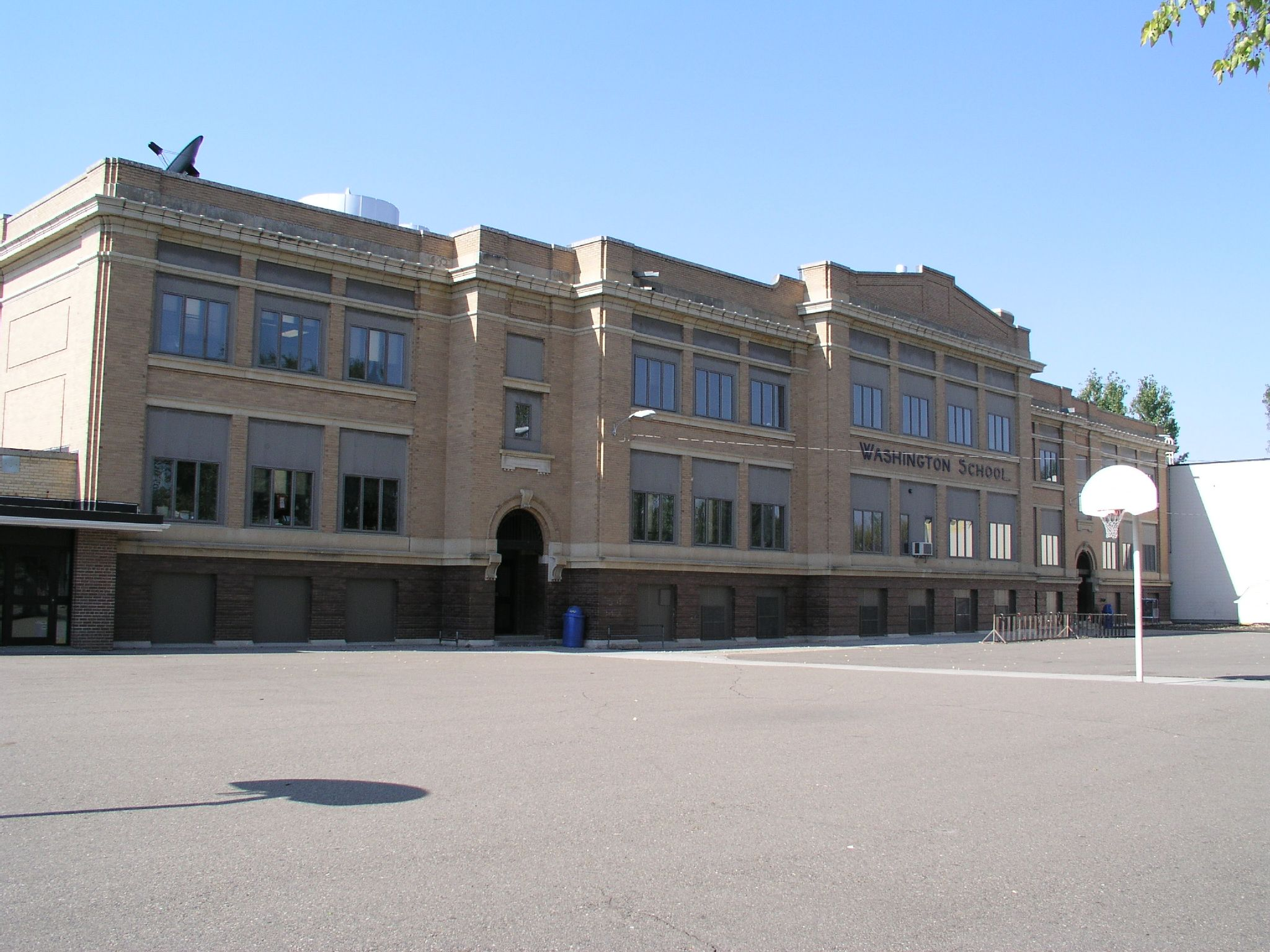
Washington School, Miles City, 1915.

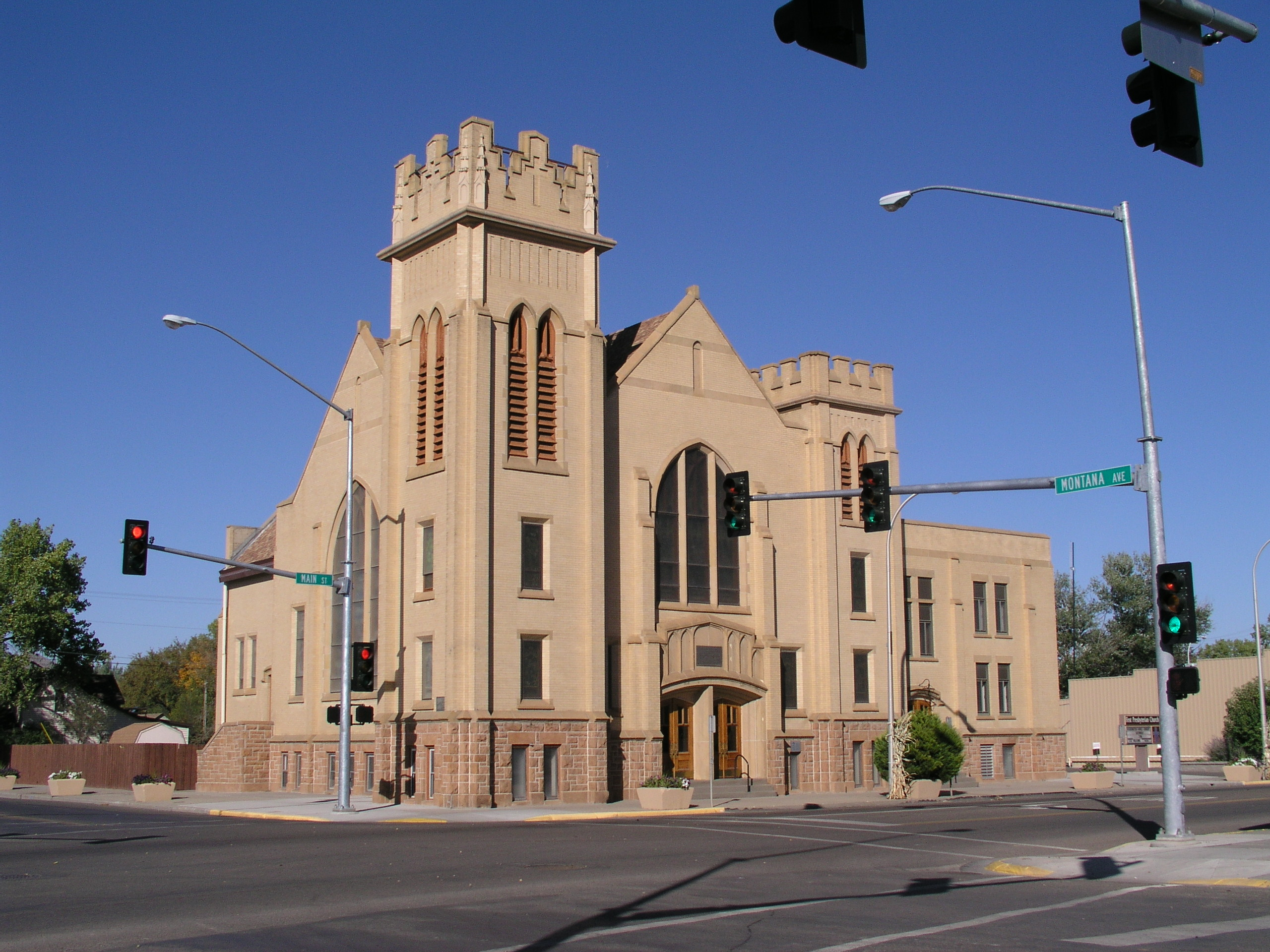
Presbyterian Church, Miles City, 1916.

Brynjulf Rivenes (July 4, 1874 – December 21, 1929) was a Norwegian-American architect practicing in Miles City, a city in sparsely settled eastern Montana.

== Biography ==
Rivenes was born in Norway in 1874, and was educated there. In 1904, he and his brother David immigrated to the United States, settling in Glendive, Montana. In 1905, Brynjulf went to the state capitol in Helena where he worked as a draftsman for architect and engineer John Hackett Kent of Bell & Kent. He then returned to Glendive, where he and his brother established an architect's office.

After a brief practice in Glendive, Rivenes moved his office to Miles City in 1906, with David staying behind to operate the Glendive office as a branch. At the time, Miles City was undergoing a period of major economic growth, and Rivenes had the opportunity to design many of the new buildings that the expanding city required.

Rivenes practiced as an architect in Miles City until his unexpected death four days before Christmas of 1929. In order to raise money, what remained of the business was sold off.

== Architectural works ==
- 1908 - Olive Hotel, 501 Main St, Miles City, Montana
- 1909 - First M. E. Church, 209 N. Kendrick Ave, Glendive, Montana
- 1909 - Jackson Block, 808 Main St, Miles City, Montana
- 1909 - Lorenzo W. Stacy House, 2206 Main St, Miles City, Montana
- 1910 - George Foster House, 1912 Main St, Miles City, Montana
- 1910 - Miles & Ulmer Building, 425 Main St, Miles City, Montana
- 1910 - Y. M. C. A. Building, 24 N 8th St, Miles City, Montana
- 1911 - Harry J. Horton House, 1918 Main St, Miles City, Montana
- 1911 - Masonic Temple, 1049 Main St, Forsyth, Montana
- 1912 - Forsyth High School, 917 Park St, Forsyth, Montana
  - Demolished
- 1912 - Masonic Temple, 909 Main St, Miles City, Montana
- 1912 - Scandinavian Lutheran Church, 2 N Lake Ave, Miles City, Montana
- 1912 - Smith Block, 811 Main St, Miles City, Montana
- 1913 - Kenney Block, 612 Main St, Miles City, Montana
- 1913 - Miles City Auditorium, 20 N 8th St, Miles City, Montana
- 1913 - Washington School, 505 N Meade Ave, Glendive, Montana
- 1914 - Glendive City Hall (included in Merrill Avenue Historic District), 300 S Merrill Ave, Glendive, Montana.
- 1915 - Douglas & Mead Building (Remodeling, included in Merrill Avenue Historic District), 119-121 N Merrill Ave, Glendive, Montana
  - Altered
- 1915 - James Hunter House, 2216 Main St, Miles City, Montana
- 1915 - Washington School, 210 N 10th St, Miles City, Montana
- 1916 - First Presbyterian Church, 1401 Main St, Miles City, Montana
- 1919 - Lambert School, 3rd Ave N, Fox Lake, Montana
  - Demolished
- 1925 - Sacred Heart R. C. Church, 316 W Benham St, Glendive, Montana
- 1928 - First Christian Church, 1720 Main St, Miles City, Montana
- 1929 - Johnson House, 2105 Main St, Miles City, Montana

Other works in the Merrill Avenue Historic District by Rivenes (with unknown dates) are:

- Krug Building,
- Rivenes-West Hardware Company Building,
- First National Bank Building (since remodeled), and
- Dion Brother Building (1910s remodeling).

== See also ==
- Merrill Avenue Historic District (Glendive, Montana)

== Other sources ==
- Guide to Historic Glendive (Montana Historical Society. 1998) ISBN 9780917298585
