= Main Street Historic District (Miles City, Montana) =

Historic district in Montana, United States

- U.S. National Register of Historic Places
- U.S. Historic district
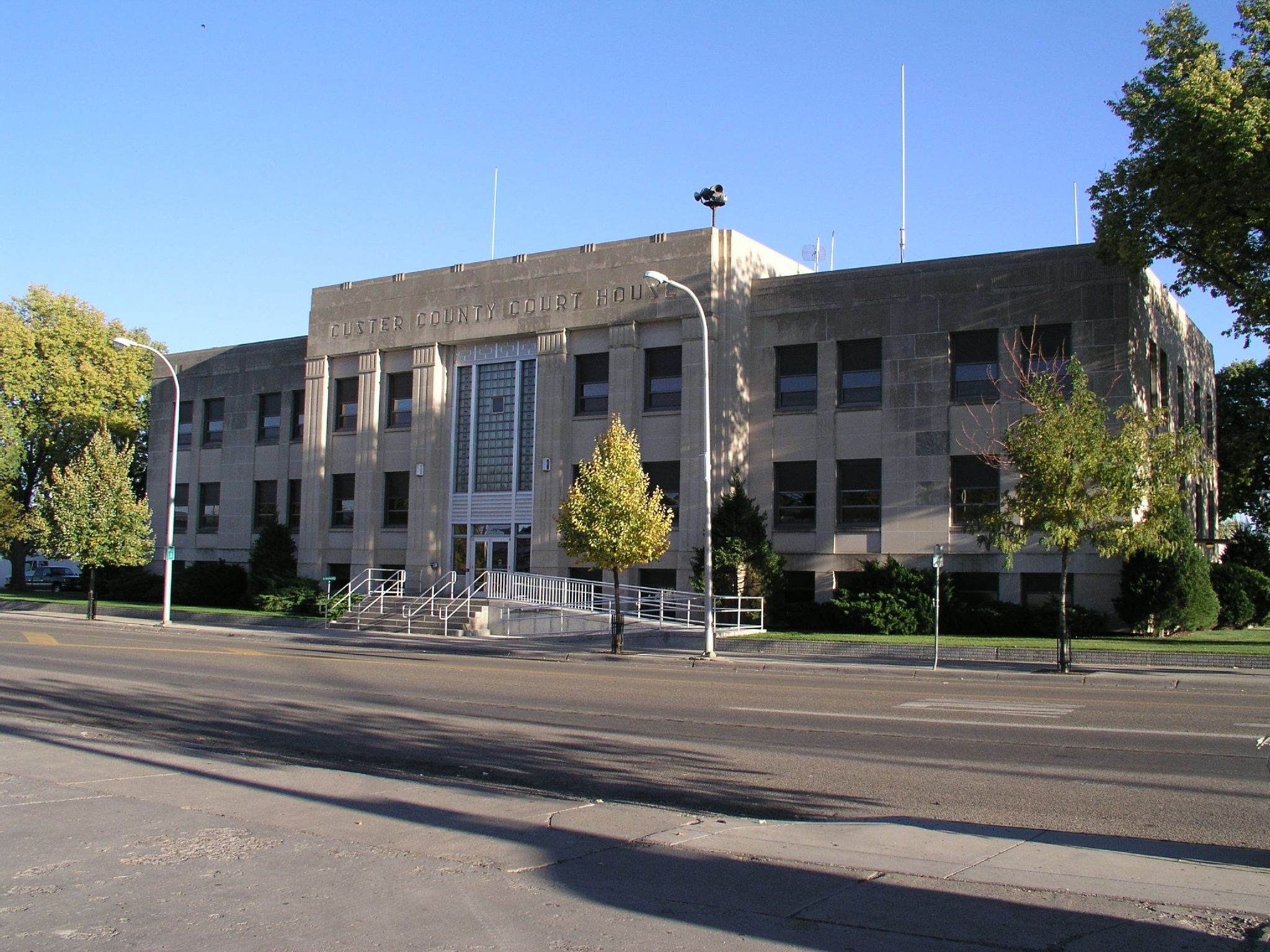
- The Custer County Courthouse, a part of the district

- Location within Montana Location within the United States
- Location: Roughly Main St. from Prairie Ave. to Fourth St., Miles City, Montana
- Coordinates: 46°24′21″N 105°50′52″W
- Architect: Byron Vreeland; Link & Haire; Brynjulf Rivenes
- Architectural style: Late 19th and 20th century revivals; Late Victorian; Modern movement
- NRHP reference No.: 89000808
- Added to NRHP: July 21, 1989

The Main Street Historic District in Miles City, Montana comprises much of the central business district of the town, extending along Main Street roughly between Prairie Avenue and Fourth Street. It was listed as a historic district on the National Register of Historic Places in 1989.

== City Hall and Fire Station (19 South 8th Street) ==
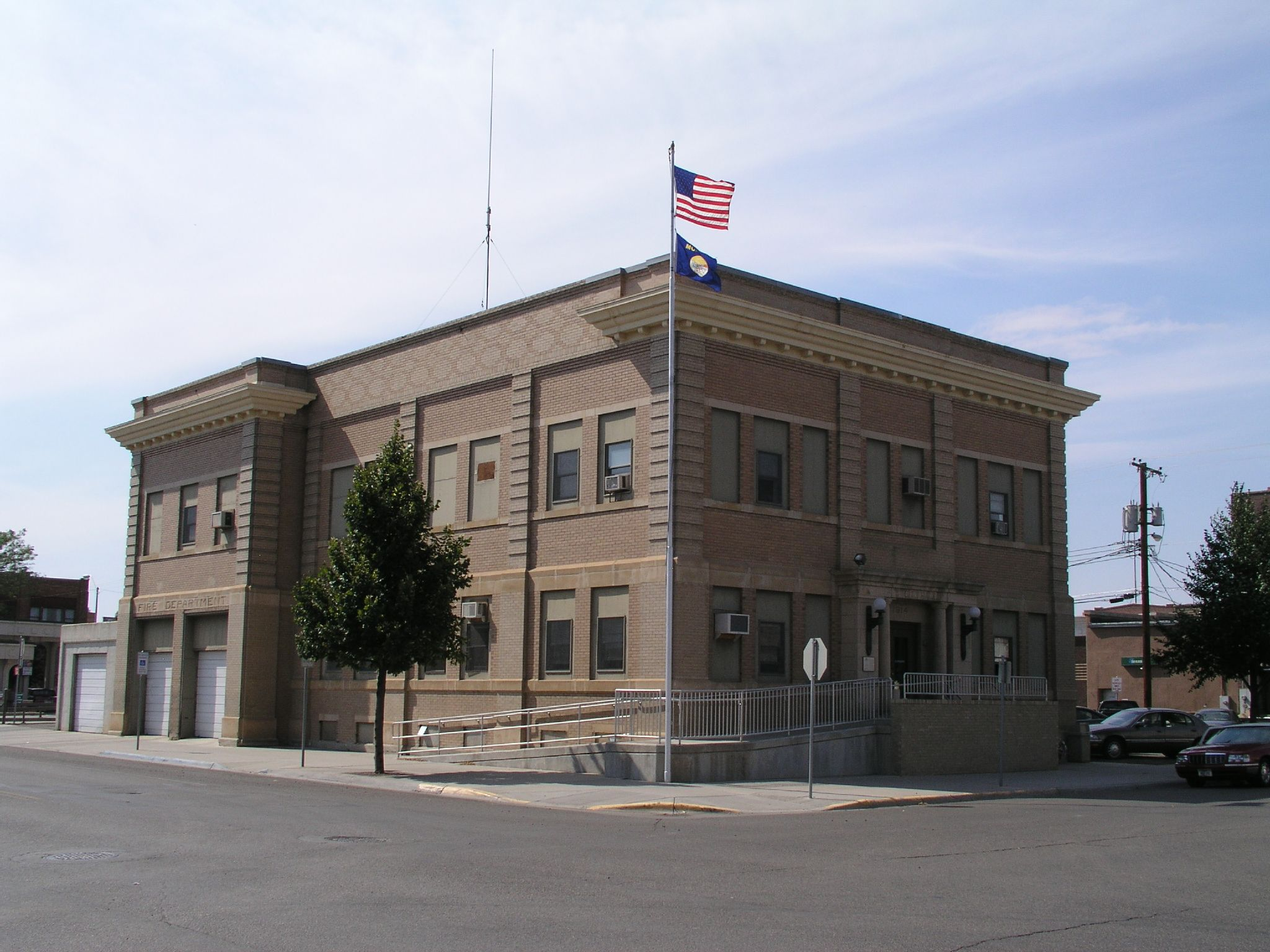
Miles City Hall and Fire Station.

The transformation of Miles City in the early 1900s into the economic, social, and governmental center of the valley precipitated the decision to build a permanent city hall. Ed Arnold, tailor and businessman, became one of the motivating forces behind the project to erect the new facility. Arriving in Miles City in 1885, Arnold served as city treasurer for two terms and achieved the position of secretary in the Custer County building. Designed by Grover C. Pruett, one of Miles City's most successful engineer/architects in the early twentieth century, this structure is Pruett's most significant landmark in the city. The two-story concrete Renaissance Revival style building faced in Hebron brick is a good example of the new "academically correct" Renaissance styling and is a symbol of Miles City as a progressive and cosmopolitan town. The words "City Hall" are carved into the sandstone frieze above the portal.

== Commercial block (511 Main Street) ==
The I. Orschel & Brothers clothing firm first located on this site in 1878 in a small wood-frame building. Following a disastrous fire that leveled much of the block, local businessmen formed a syndicate to build this four-part commercial building designed by Byron Vreeland, Miles City's first resident architect. Completed in the fall of 1885, John Carter's Saloon (509), I. Orschel & Brothers Clothing Store (511), Miles & Strevell's Hardware (513), and Basinski Brothers (515) were the original occupants. The combination of Romanesque Revival, Gothic Revival, and Queen Anne-style detailing carries Vreeland's architectural signature. Although the parapets and towers that originally graced the roofline have long been removed, the brownstone windowsills, polychrome tile, soft brick, and cast iron columns survive. The Orschels' landmark business catered to local cowboys at this location until 1940. The brothers let cowboys keep their trunks on the upper floor until they came to town to change clothes. Inside, the original tin ceiling remains intact.

== First Presbyterian Church (1401 Main Street) ==
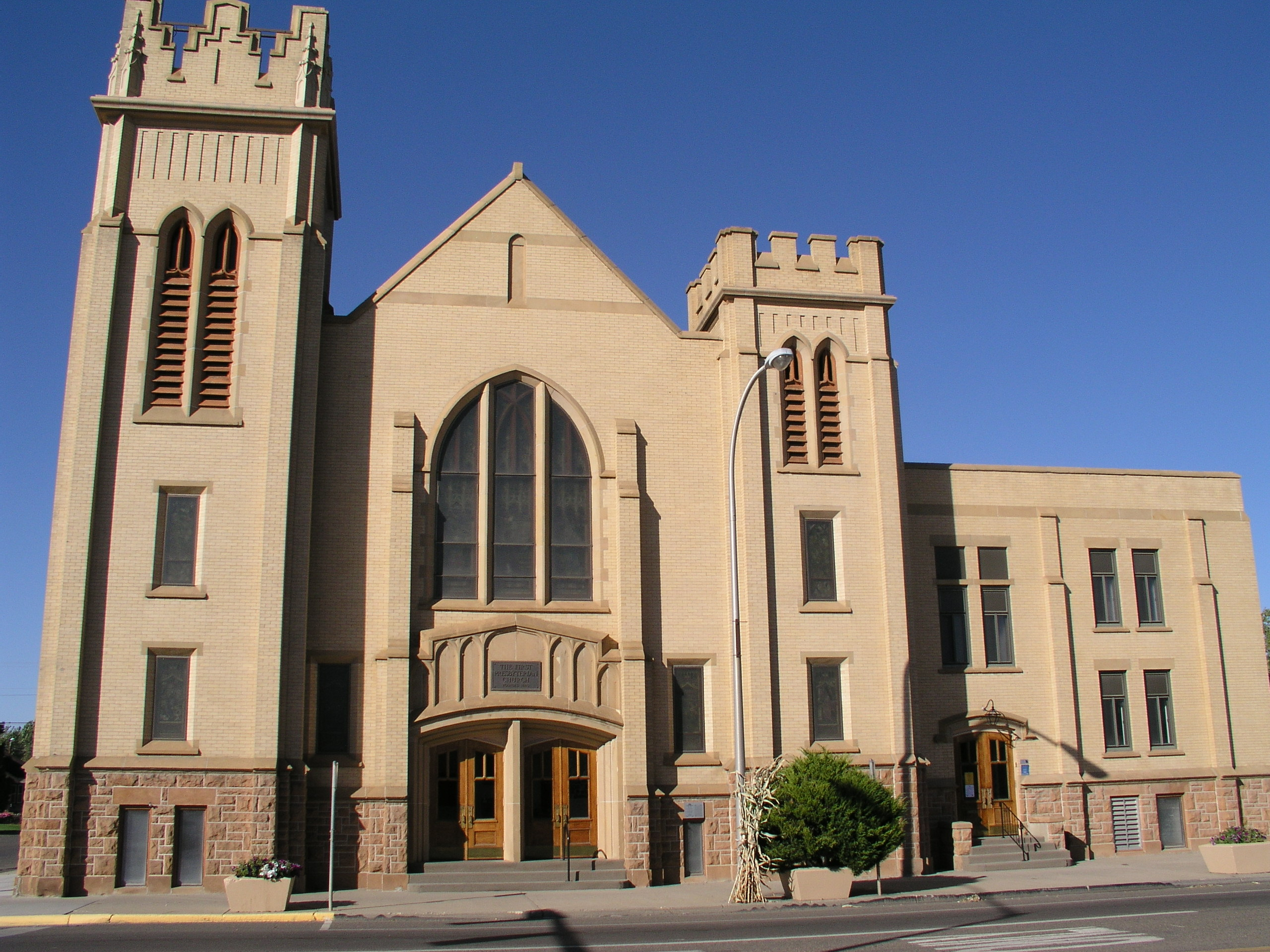
The 1882-built First Presbyterian Church.

Charter members George and Helen Miles bestowed this land on the church in 1882. Since that time the First Presbyterian Church has occupied this space. Church trustees met in 1911 to discuss the construction of a larger $30,000–$40,000 (equivalent to $1,037,000–$1,382,000 in 2025) church. Pastor Reverend J. Forsythe Smith reasoned that a new house of worship would "provide better social advantages, better intellectual advantages, and better moral and spiritual advantages." In addition to a larger worship space, the modern facility would include a Sunday school and choir room. Architect Brynjulf Rivenes designed the concrete and brick edifice on the same site as the old church, which was sold and relocated to face North Prairie. Western Granite and Marble Works of Miles City donated the cornerstone, laid on November 26, 1914. C. N. Strevell gifted the main stained glass window fronting Montana Avenue. The oak finished, 871-pipe Estry organ was specially designed to fit the organ chamber. Dedicated in 1917, this Gothic Revival style church conveys a sense of stability and permanence.

== Jackson Block (808 Main Street) ==
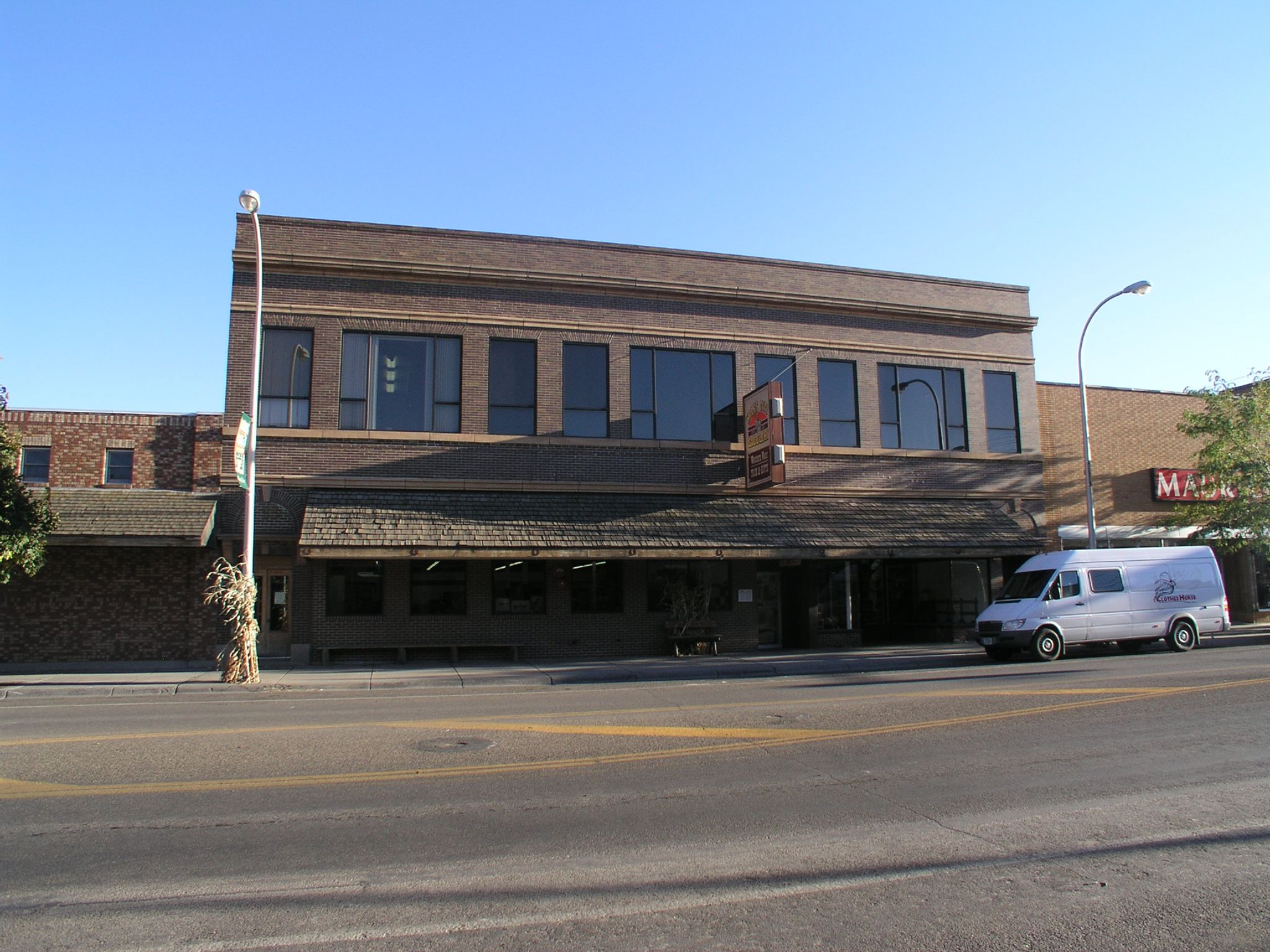
The Miles City Saddlery, at 808 Main Street

The two-story building suggests ways that urban architectural trends were translated and adapted in small communities. Its main decoration derives from the pattern created by its windows; in this, the 1909 commercial block echoes the emphasis on light, air and space found in turn-of-the-century "Chicago-style" skyscrapers. Miles City architect Brynjulf Rivenes designed the surprisingly modern building for entrepreneur W. C. Jackson, a confectioner who owned a shop at 613 Main. With fellow Miles City businessman Ed Arnold, Jackson also invested in the next-door Arnold Block. Built in 1913, it matched the lines of the Jackson Block, and doorways connected the buildings on the second floor. From Jackson Block storefronts merchants sold pianos, office equipment, clothing, and dry goods. Second-floor tenants included Brynjulf Rivenes and the Montana Institute, a private school that offered both day and night classes in automobile engineering, bookkeeping, stenography, and penmanship.

== Kenney Block (Montana Saloon) (612 Main Street) ==
Originally a saloon (1893), then a saddlery (1900–1907), businessman James Kenney purchased the property in 1908 to house his Montana Saloon. Architect Brynjulf Rivenes designed the 1913 Renaissance Revival style facade and the double structure was renamed the Kenney Block. The saloon, occupying half the ground-floor space, is one of the state's best preserved historic interiors. The saloon includes its original pressed tin ceiling, three-pillared back bar, mosaic floor tiles, paddle fans, leather booths, wooden cooler, and leaded glass.

== Dr. Redd's Brick Building ==
Dr. Robert G. Redd served as an army surgeon at Fort Keogh in the 1870s. Redd resigned in 1881 to assume a private practice. He served as county physician, coroner, and surgeon for the Northern Pacific Railroad as well as mayor from 1889 to 1900. He commissioned architect Byron Vreeland to design a two-story permanent building for his drug store. Henry C. Smith—mayor from 1911 to 1913—purchased the edifice in 1908 and contracted with city engineer Grover C. Pruett to remodel the facade in 1915. The marble and terra cotta Renaissance Revival style of the building was rare in Miles City and Smith used it to advertise the city's cosmopolitan attributes in the early twentieth century. "1915" appears in a terra cotta rectangle above the windows and the entrance bears a polychrome mosaic tile floor arranged in the image of a pocket watch. Although remodeling obliterated the original facade, the original 1883 corbelling remains on the east side.

== Shore-Newcom Building ==
The Shore-Newcom Store opened in 1900 in the Foster Building at 701 Main. Owned and operated by Thomas Shore and Wirt H. Newcom, the store handled mercantile goods. They moved to 709 Main in 1905, and upon the completion of this structure in 1914, the store expanded next door to include gentlemen's and ladies' ready-to-wear. By 1922, the company had grown into the third largest general merchandise business in the state. The partnership dissolved in 1922 but Shore remained involved in the venture. The Shore family continued operating a department store late into the twentieth century. Shore and Newcom, like building owner George Miles, were typical of Miles City businessmen who wanted to display their confidence in the city's future through progressive and sophisticated buildings. Construction here represented a visible symbol of the partnership's success as well as the city's. Architecturally, the building is an outstanding example the Renaissance Revival style's streamlined appearance. One of the best surviving examples in Miles City, the building and its simple lines reflect the desire for a modern business district.
