= Herman Kemna =

American architect

- Born: c. 1858; Germany
- Died: June 7, 1937; Butte, Montana, U.S.
- Resting place: Mount Moriah Cemetery, Butte, Montana, U.S.
- Occupation: Architect
- Spouse: Ann Kemna
- Children: 2 sons

Herman Kemna (c. 1858 – June 7, 1937) was an American architect who designed many buildings in the state of Montana.

== Life ==
Kemna was born circa 1858 in Germany. He emigrated to the United States in the 1880s to work as an engineer for the Northern Railway Company in Montana.

Kemna designed many buildings in Helena, including the Broadwater Plunge and Hotel, and in Butte, including the Owsley Block, the Phoenix Block, the Thomas Block, and several schools.

With Byron Vreeland, Kemna designed at least two buildings in Bozeman: the R.T. Barnett and Company Building, listed on the National Register of Historic Places, and the Palace Saloon.

Kemna had a wife, Ann, and two sons. He resided in Butte for 45 years, where he died on June 7, 1937, in Butte, at age 79. He was buried in the Mount Moriah Cemetery.
