= Walrond and Elizabeth Snell House =

Historic house in Montana, United States

- U.S. National Register of Historic Places
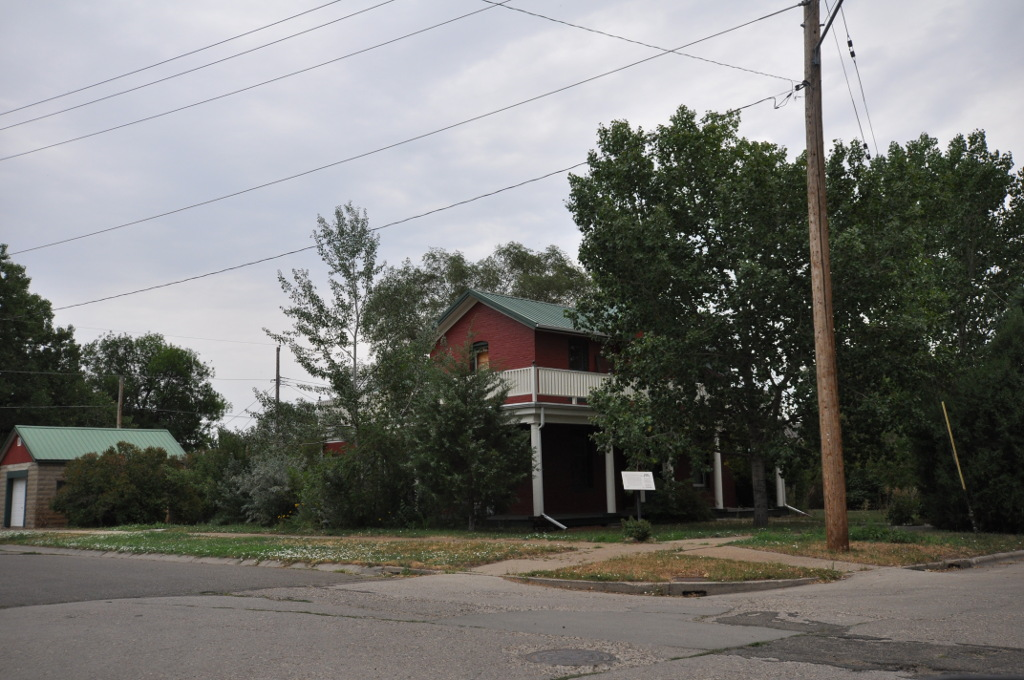

- Location within Montana Location within the United States
- Location: 402 S. Lake St., Miles City, Montana
- Coordinates: 46°24′16″N 105°50′15″W
- Area: less than one acre
- Built: 1882-83
- Built by: Byron Vreeland
- Architectural style: Folk Victorian
- NRHP reference No.: 03000923
- Added to NRHP: September 11, 2003

The Walrond and Elizabeth Snell House (also known as the William and Carolyn Ladd House) is a historic house located at 402 South Lake Street in Miles City, Montana.

== Description and history ==
It was built in the Folk Victorian style in 1882–83. It is a two-story house built with load-bearing brick walls, with a two-story frame addition at its south east end. It was added to the National Register of Historic Places on September 11, 2003.

The house is described in its 2003 NRHP nomination as "unassuming" but deemed notable as:

...it is one of the first masonry residences in Miles City, and its construction coincides with the first wave of economic development in the area, as well as the arrival of the railroad. A major remodel of the house between 1910 and 1916 is reflective of the economic prosperity realized in the area during that time. The Snell family, successful and influential in the sheepraising and banking businesses, purchased the property in 1891, and enjoyed a long and prosperous association with the community. The building is also eligible for listing ... as a representative example of Late Victorian architecture, and its association with the first and most prominent architect in Miles City, Byron Vreeland. Much of the interior of house retains its historic features, including the steep front staircase with wood railing and wainscoting and its unusual layout with a large dining room spanning the width of the house. The dining room has eight doors and a bay window lining the walls.
