= R.T. Barnett and Company Building =

- Barnett, R. T., and Company Building
- U.S. National Register of Historic Places
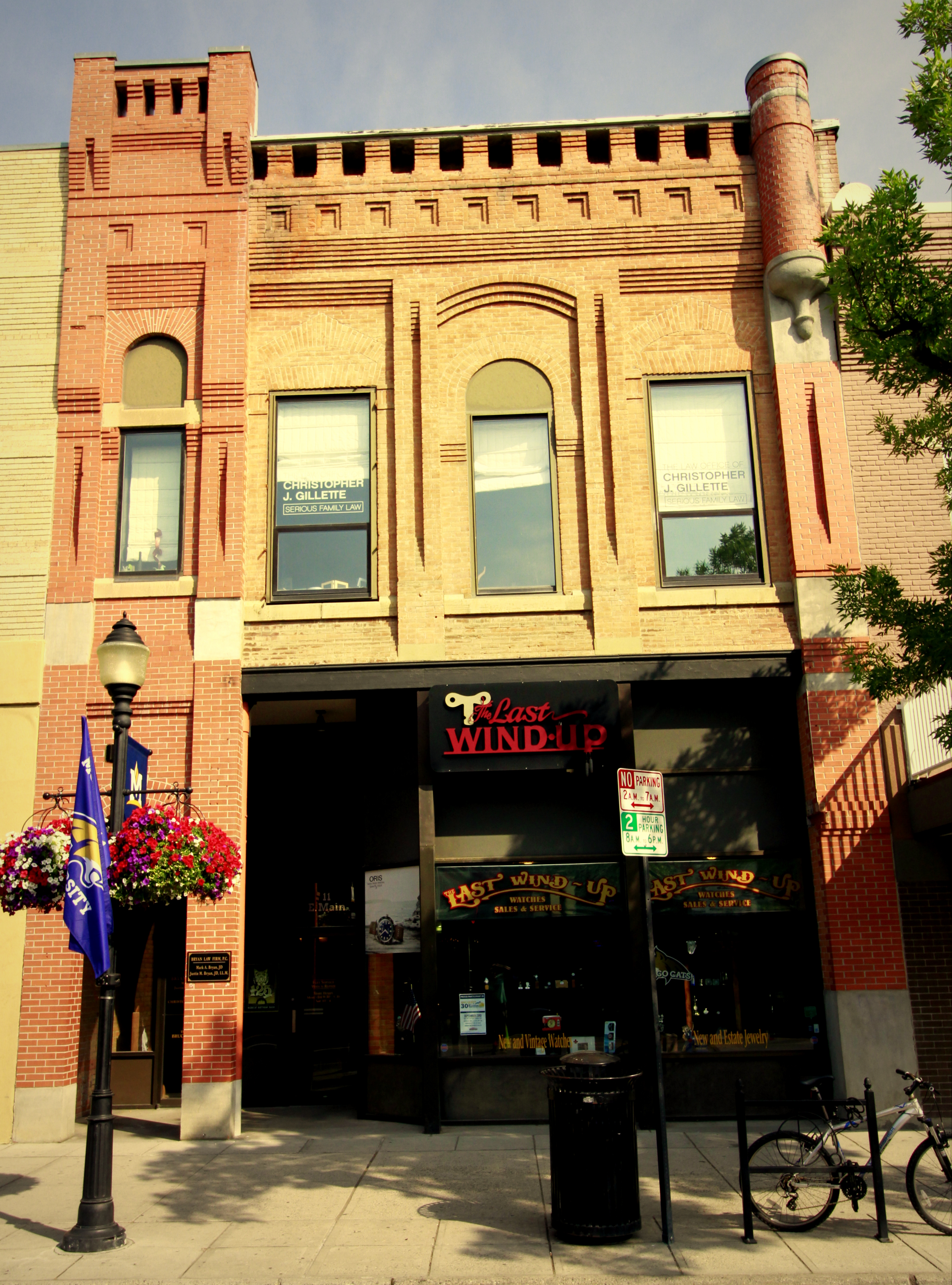
- The building in 2017

- Location within Montana Location within the United States
- Location: 13 East Main Street, Bozeman, Montana
- Coordinates: 45°40′43″N 111°02′12″W
- Area: less than one acre
- Built: 1889
- Architect: Byron Vreeland, Herman Kemna
- Architectural style: Gothic Revival, Byzantine Revival
- NRHP reference No.: 80002416
- Added to NRHP: December 1, 1980

The R.T. Barnett and Company Building is a historic two-story building in Bozeman, Montana. It was designed in the Victorian Eclectic style with Gothic Revival and Byzantine Revival features by architects Byron Vreeland and Herman Kemna, and built in 1889–1890 for Robert Barnett, the owner of the Northern Pacific Hotel. It has been listed on the National Register of Historic Places since December 1, 1980.
