= Byron Vreeland =

American architect (1844–1889)

- Born: 1844
- Died: 1889 (aged 44–45); Bozeman, Montana
- Occupation: Architect

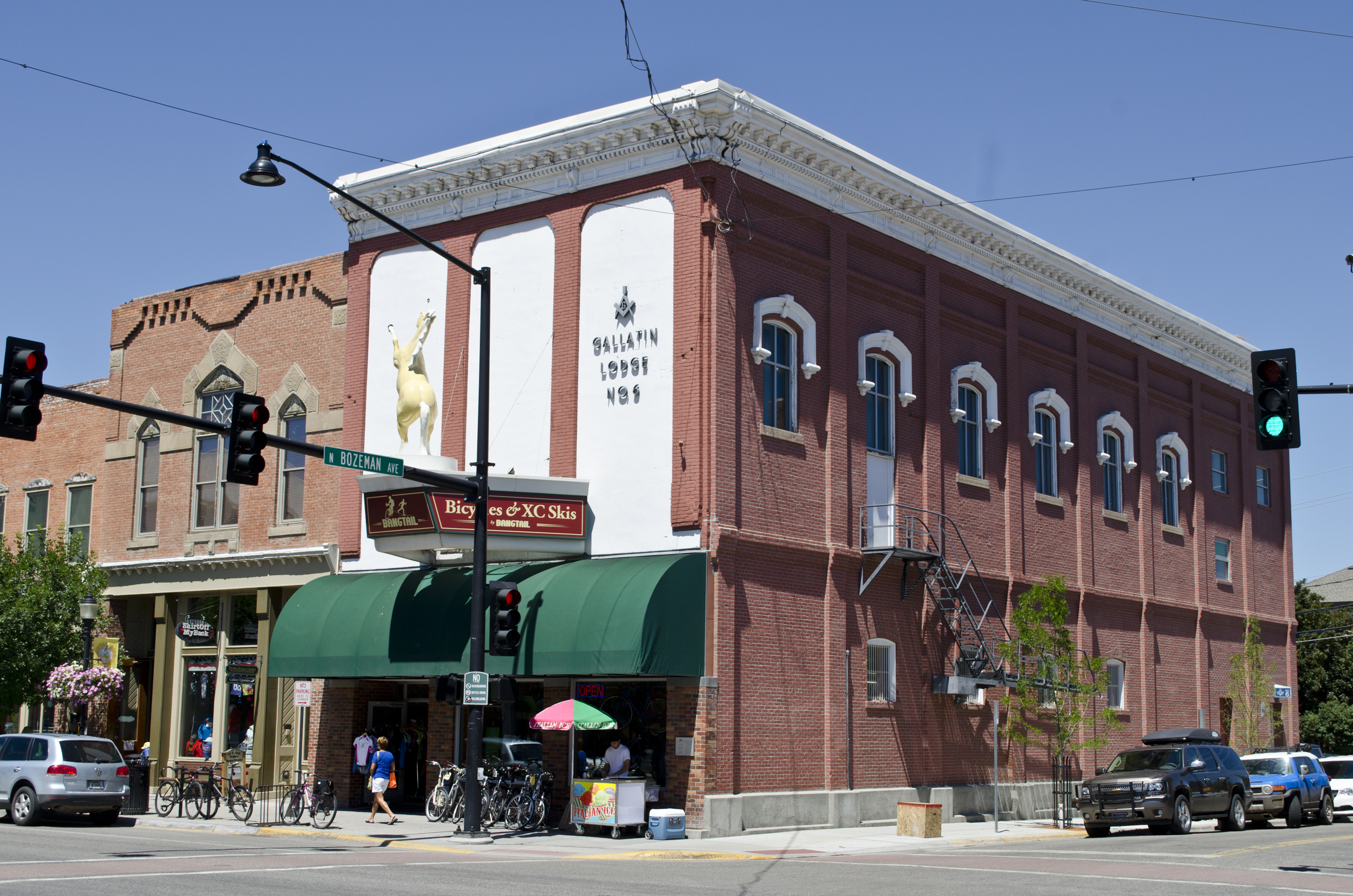
Masonic Temple (R) and Palace Saloon (L), Bozeman, 1880 and 1883.

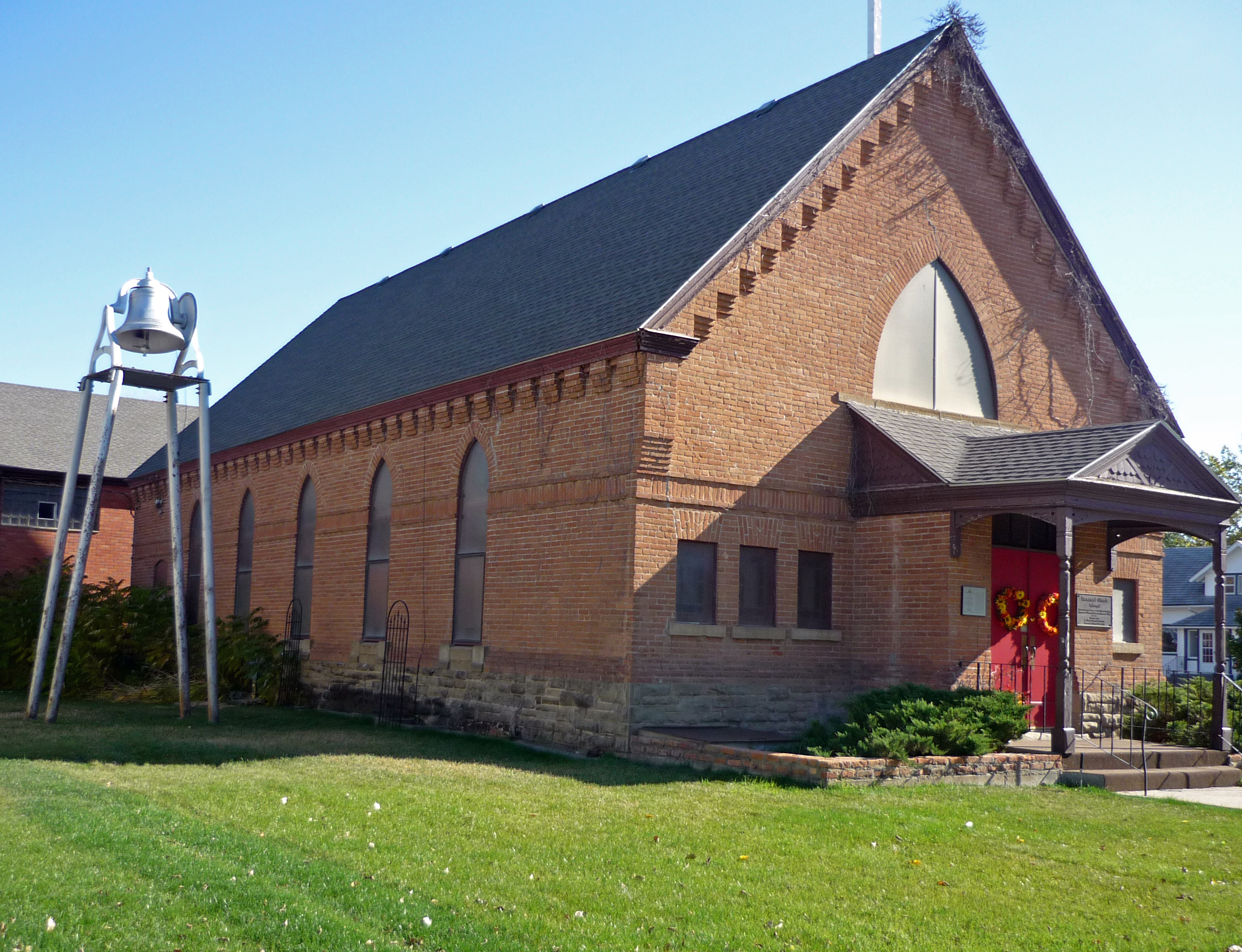
Emmanuel Church, Miles City, 1886.

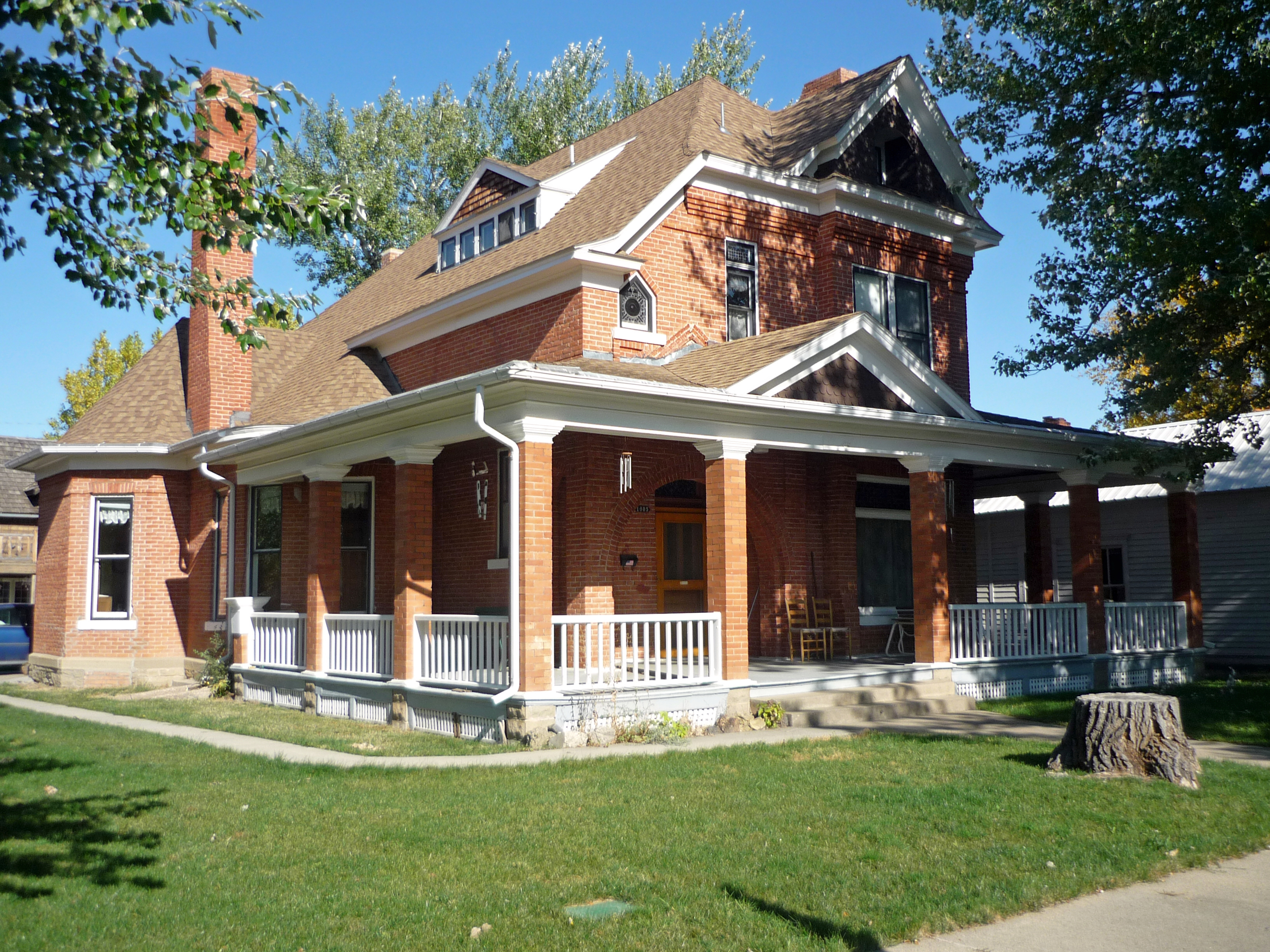
E. H. Johnson House, Miles City, 1887.

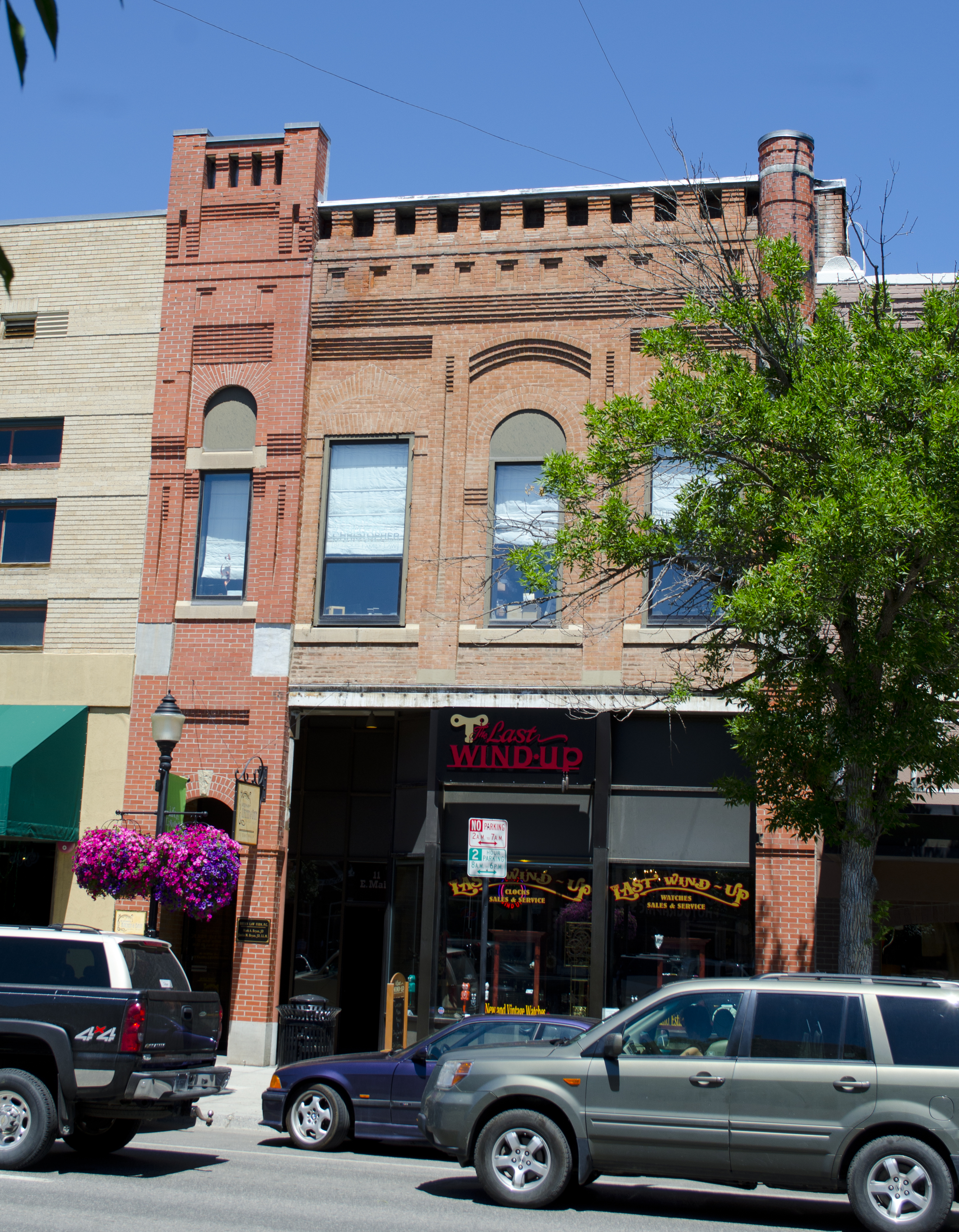
Barnett Building, Bozeman, 1889.

Byron Vreeland (1844–1889) was an American architect practicing in Bozeman and Miles City, Montana, where he pioneered the profession.

== Life ==
Vreeland's early life and education are unknown, though he was trained as an architect. In the late 1870s he and his brother, builder Frank W. Vreeland, arrived in Bozeman. The two brothers established the firm of B. & F. W. Vreeland, architects and builders. By 1882 Frank W. Vreeland had retired from the firm, and was replaced by Herman Kemna. Simultaneously with this event, Vreeland relocated to Miles City, then a boomtown. Vreeland & Kemna operated until 1887, when Vreeland returned to Bozeman and Kemna went to Helena. He died in 1889.

At least two of Vreeland's works have been placed on the National Register of Historic Places, and several others contribute to at least three listed historic districts.

== Architectural works ==
=== B. & F. W. Vreeland, until 1882 ===
- 1880 - Gallatin County Courthouse, 311 W Main St, Bozeman, Montana
  - Demolished
- 1880 - Masonic Temple, 137 E Main St, Bozeman, Montana

=== Vreeland & Kemna, 1882-1887 ===
- 1883 - Palace Saloon, 135 E Main St, Bozeman, Montana
- 1884 - Fred A. Fielding House, 420 S Willson Ave, Bozeman, Montana
- 1886 - Nelson Story House, 404 W Main St, Bozeman, Montana
  - Demolished
- 1887 - Bozeman City Hall and Opera House, E Main St & S Rouse Ave, Bozeman, Montana
  - Demolished in 1964

=== Byron Vreeland, 1882-1889 ===
- 1882 - First National Bank Building, 519 Main St, Miles City, Montana
  - Demolished in 1910
- 1882 - Walrond S. Snell House, 402 S Lake Ave, Miles City, Montana
- 1884 - Custer County Courthouse, 1010 Main St, Miles City, Montana
  - Demolished in 1949
- 1885 - Commercial Block, 511 Main St, Miles City, Montana
- 1885 - Leighton & Jordan Block, 500 Main St, Miles City, Montana
- 1886 - Byron Vreeland House, 707 Washington St, Miles City, Montana
  - The architect's own residence
- 1886 - White Sulphur Springs School, S Central Ave, White Sulphur Springs, Montana
  - Demolished
- 1886 - Emmanuel Episcopal Church, 208 N 8th St, Miles City, Montana
- 1887 - E. H. Johnson House, 1005 Palmer St, Miles City, Montana
- 1889 - Barnett Building, 13 E Main St, Bozeman, Montana
