= Bon Ton Historic District =

Historic district in Montana, United States

- U.S. National Register of Historic Places
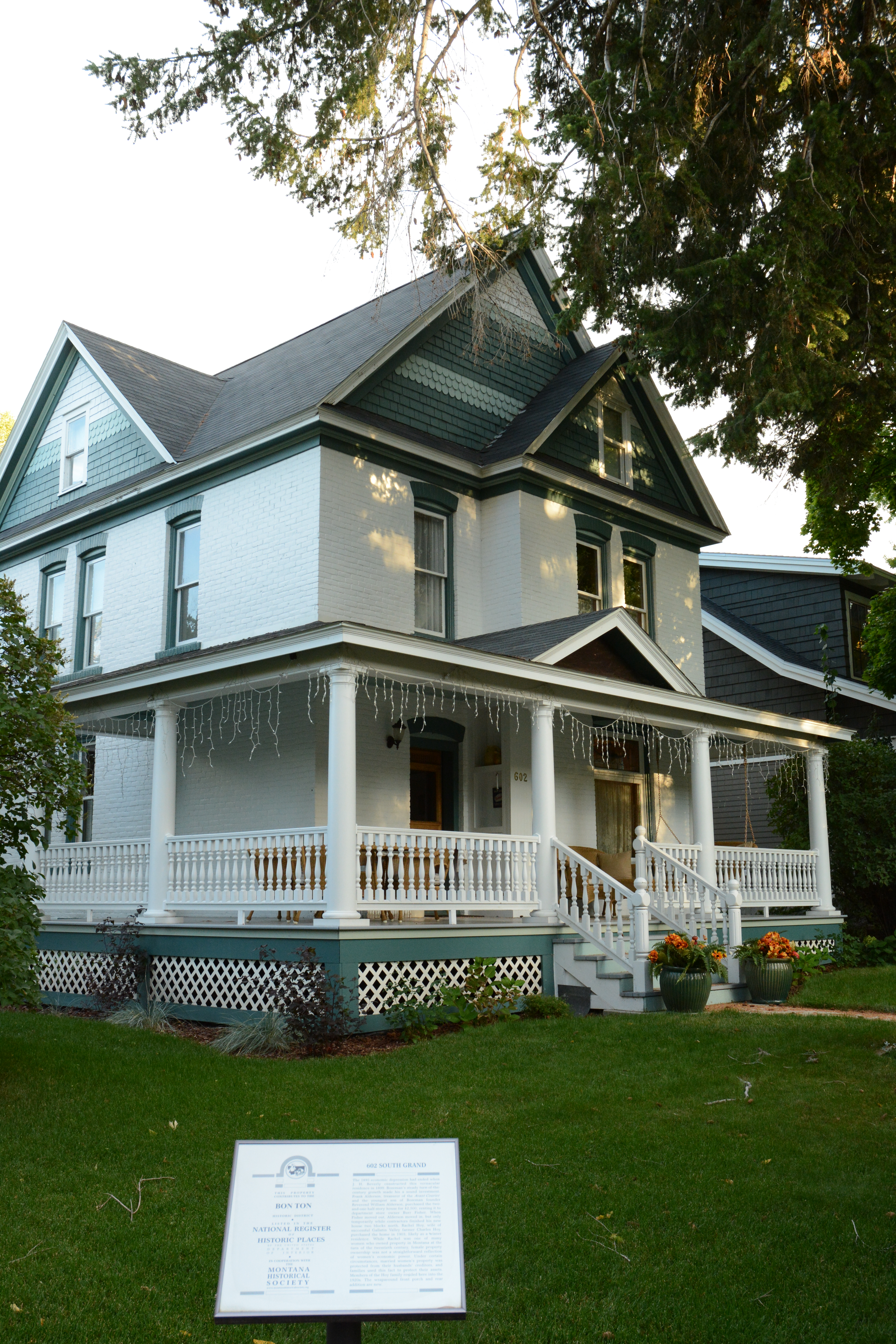
- 602 South Grand

- Location within Montana Location within the United States
- Location: Roughly bounded by Olive St., Willson Ave., Cleveland St., & Fourth Ave., Bozeman, Montana
- Coordinates: 45°40′38″N 111°02′36″W
- Area: 80 acres (32 ha)
- Built: 1880
- Built by: Multiple
- Architectural style: Colonial Revival, Bungalow/craftsman, Late Victorian
- MPS: Bozeman MRA
- NRHP reference No.: 87001816
- Added to NRHP: October 23, 1987

The Bon Ton Historic District is a residential historic district in Bozeman, Montana which was listed on the National Register of Historic Places in 1987.

The district is 80 acres (32 ha) in area and is roughly bounded by Olive St., Willson Ave., Cleveland St., and Fourth Ave. It included 190 contributing buildings and 39 non-contributing ones.

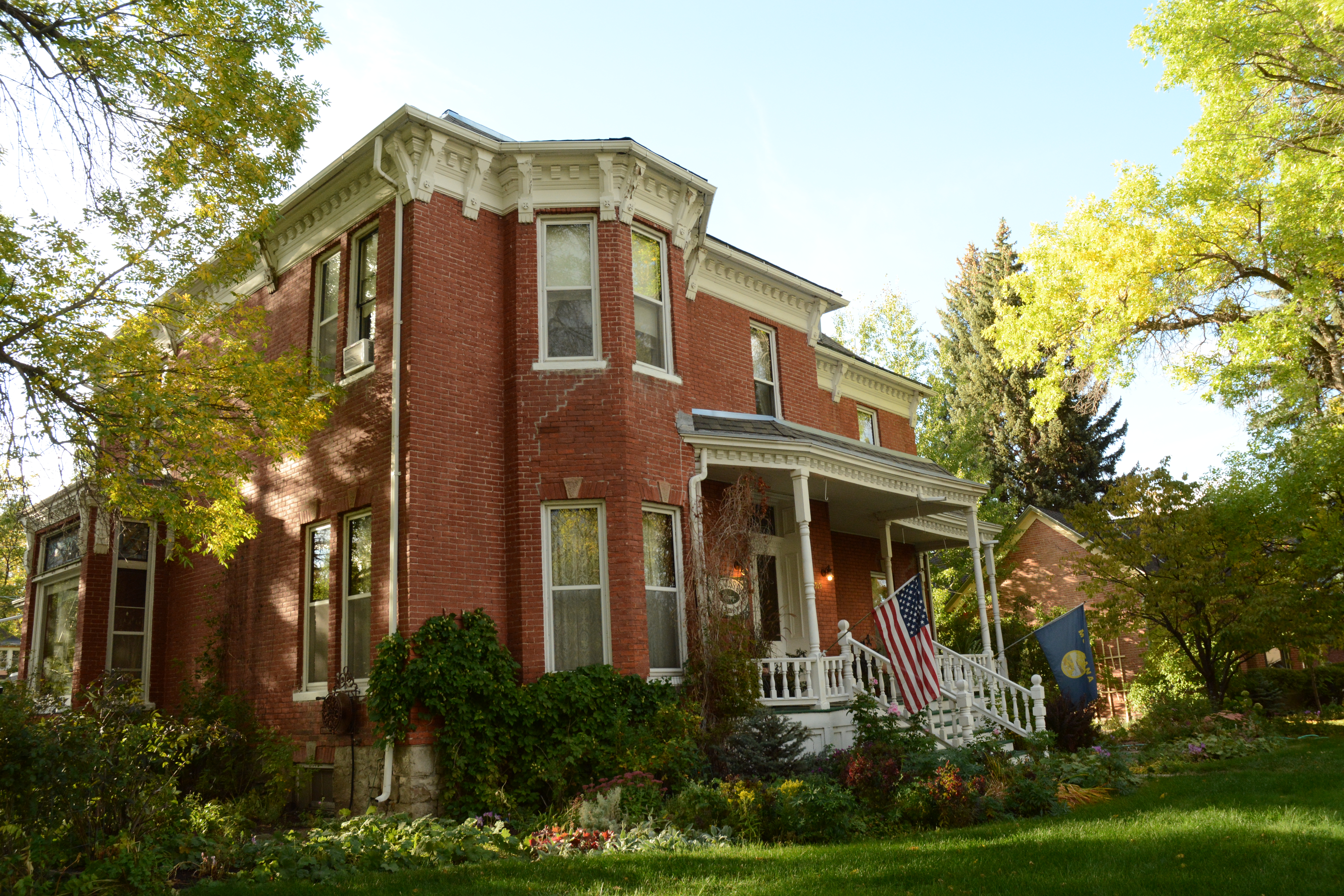
Italianate style Voss Inn, in the district

It is asserted to include Bozeman's "finest examples of historic residential architecture, spanning from the early 1880s to the mid-1930s", including wood frame and brick houses in Italianate, Queen Anne, Colonial Revival, Bungalow and other styles. Many of the houses have elaborate ornamentation, towers, and/or wraparound porches. The southern and eastern borders of the district are defined by S. William Avenue and W. Cleveland St., two streets with elegant concrete lampposts installed in 1935.

The T. Byron Story House, at 811 S. Willson on its own full block, "ranks among the most elaborate historic houses in Montana."
