= List of radio stations in Montana =

The following is a list of FCC-licensed radio stations in the U.S. state of Montana, which can be sorted by their call signs, frequencies, cities of license, licensees, and programming formats.

== List of radio stations ==
Call sign	Frequency	City of license	Licensee	Format
KAAK	98.9 FM	Great Falls	Townsquare License, LLC	Top 40 (CHR)
KAAR	92.5 FM	Butte	Townsquare License, LLC	Country
KAFH	91.5 FM	Great Falls	American Family Association	Religious Talk (AFR)
KALS	97.1 FM	Kalispell	Hi-Line Radio Fellowship Inc.	Religious
KANB-LP	102.3 FM	Kalispell	Flathead Adventist Radio, Inc.	Christian
KAPC	91.3 FM	Butte	University of Montana	Public radio
KATL	770 AM	Miles City	Star Printing Company	Adult contemporary
KATQ	1070 AM	Plentywood	Radio International KATQ Broadcast Association	Classic country
KATQ-FM	100.1 FM	Plentywood	Radio International KATQ Broadcast Association	Classic rock
KBAS-LP	98.3 FM	Basin	Jefferson County Disaster & Emergency Services	Emergency Info
KBAZ	96.3 FM	Hamilton	Townsquare License, LLC	Mainstream rock
KBBZ	98.5 FM	Kalispell	Bee Broadcasting, Inc.	Classic rock
KBCK	95.9 FM	Columbia Falls	Bee Broadcasting, Inc.	Country
KBEV-FM	98.3 FM	Dillon	Dead Air Broadcasting Company, Inc.	Adult contemporary
KBGA	89.9 FM	Missoula	University of Montana	Student radio
KBIL	89.7 FM	Park City	Educational Media Foundation	Worship music (Air1)
KBLG	910 AM	Billings	Desert Mountain Broadcasting Licenses, LLC	Sports (ESPN)
KBLL	99.5 FM	Helena	The Montana Radio Company, LLC	Classic country
KBLW	90.1 FM	Billings	Hi-Line Radio Fellowship, Inc.	Religious
KBMC	102.1 FM	Bozeman	Montana State University – Billings	Public radio
KBMF-LP	102.5 FM	Butte	Butte America Foundation	Variety
KBOW	550 AM	Butte	Butte Broadcasting, Inc.	Country
KBOZ	1090 AM	Bozeman	Desert Mountain Broadcasting Licenses LLC	Classic country
KBOZ-FM	99.9 FM	Bozeman	Desert Mountain Broadcasting Licenses LLC	Oldies
KBUL	970 AM	Billings	Townsquare License, LLC	News/Talk
KBWG-LP	107.5 FM	Browning	Blackfeet Tribe	Variety
KBXI	92.5 FM	Park City	Anthony Media Inc.	Adult hits
KBZM	104.7 FM	Big Sky	Orion Media LLC	Classic rock
KCAP	950 AM	Helena	The Montana Radio Company, LLC	News/Talk
KCCH-LP	97.7 FM	Helena	Calvary Chapel of Helena, Inc.	Religious Teaching
KCGM	95.7 FM	Scobey	Prairie Communications, Inc.	Country
KCHH	95.5 FM	Worden	Townsquare License, LLC	Adult contemporary
KCMM	99.1 FM	Belgrade	Gallatin Valley Witness Inc	Religious
KCTR-FM	102.9 FM	Billings	Townsquare License, LLC	Country
KDBM	1490 AM	Dillon	Dead-Air Broadcasting Company, Inc	Classic country
KDBR	106.3 FM	Kalispell	Bee Broadcasting, Inc.	Country
KDGZ-LP	98.3 FM	Townsend	Townsend K12 School District #1	Variety
KDTR	103.3 FM	Florence	Missoula Broadcasting Company, LLC	Adult album alternative
KDWG	90.9 FM	Dillon	University of Montana	Variety
KDXT	97.9 FM	Lolo	Western Rockies Radio, Inc.	Country
KDZN	96.5 FM	Glendive	Magic Air Communications	Country
KEAC-LP	106.1 FM	Cardwell	Jefferson County Disaster & Emergency Services	Emergency Info
KEAJ-LP	100.3 FM	Cell Site	Jefferson County Disaster & Emergency Services	Emergency Info
KEIN	1310 AM	Great Falls	Tiger Butte Broadcasting, Inc.	Comedy
KEMC	91.7 FM	Billings	Montana State University – Billings	Public radio
KEME-LP	105.9 FM	Boulder	Jefferson County Disaster & Emergency Services	Emergency Info
KENR	107.5 FM	Superior	Anderson Radio Broadcasting, Inc.	Top 40 (CHR)
KERR	750 AM	Polson	Anderson Radio Broadcastin Inc	Country
KESW-LP	106.5 FM	Whitehall	Jefferson County Disaster & Emergency Services	Emergency Info
KETI-LP	95.7 FM	Choteau	Waves of Wisdom, Inc.	Christian
KEUK	89.7 FM	Eureka	University of Montana	Public radio
KEUR-LP	88.3 FM	Eureka	Eureka Adventist Radio, Inc.	Christian
KEWF	98.5 FM	Billings	BMG Billings, LLC	Country
KEZQ	92.9 FM	West Yellowstone	Jackson Hole Radio, LLC	Soft adult contemporary
KFGL	88.1 FM	Butte	Old Fashion Baptist Church of Butte	Christian
KFGM-FM	101.5 FM	Frenchtown	Missoula Community Radio	Community radio
KFHW-LP	101.1 FM	Billings	Best of Billings Schools Association	Variety
KFLF	91.3 FM	Somers	Educational Media Foundation	Worship music (Air1)
KFLN	960 AM	Baker	Newell Media, LLC	Country
KFRD	88.9 FM	Butte	Family Stations, Inc.	Religious
KGCM	90.9 FM	Three Forks	Hi-Line Radio Fellowship	Religious
KGCX	93.1 FM	Sidney	Sidney Community Broadcasting Corp.	Classic rock
KGEZ	600 AM	Kalispell	Flathead Valley Wireless Association LLC	Full service
KGFA	90.7 FM	Great Falls	Educational Media Foundation	Worship music (Air1)
KGFC	88.9 FM	Great Falls	Hi-Line Radio Fellowship, Inc.	Religious
KGFJ	88.1 FM	Belt	CSN International	Religious (CSN International)
KGGL	93.3 FM	Missoula	Townsquare License, LLC	Country
KGHL	790 AM	Billings	KGHL Radio, LLC	Classic country/Agriculture
KGLE	590 AM	Glendive	Hi-Line Radio Fellowship, Inc.	Religious
KGLM-FM	97.7 FM	Anaconda	Butte Broadcasting, Inc.	Top 40 (CHR)
KGLT	91.9 FM	Bozeman	Board of Regents – Montana University System	Variety
KGLZ	89.1 FM	East Helena	Board of Regents – Montana University System	Public radio
KGPR	89.9 FM	Great Falls	Great Falls Public Radio Assoc.	Public radio
KGRZ	1450 AM	Missoula	Townsquare License, LLC	Sports (FSR)
KGVA	88.1 FM	Fort Belknap Agency	Fort Belknap College	Public radio
KGVM	95.9 FM	Bozeman	Gallatin Valley Community Radio	Community radio
KGVO	1290 AM	Missoula	Townsquare License, LLC	News/Talk
KHDN	1230 AM	Hardin	Montana Radio Broadcasting Company LLC	News/Talk
KHDV	107.9 FM	Darby	Sheila Callahan and Friends, Inc.	Classic hits
KHEW	88.5 FM	Rocky Boy's Reservation	Chippewa Cree Tribe of the Rocky Boy's Reservation	Variety
KHFG-LP	101.7 FM	Helena	KHFG-LP, Inc.	Christian rock (Effect Radio)
KHGC	98.5 FM	Montana City	Hi-Line Radio Fellowship, Inc.	Christian
KHKM	98.7 FM	Hamilton	Legacy Broadcasting, Inc.	Classic hip hop
KHLV	90.1 FM	Helena	Educational Media Foundation	Contemporary Christian (K-Love)
KHNK	1240 AM	Whitefish	Bee Broadcasting, Inc.	Sports (FSR)
KHRU-LP	93.1 FM	Libby	This Hope Radio	Christian
KHSI	89.7 FM	Conrad	Holy Spirit Radio	Religious Teaching
KHTC	1490 AM	Malmstrom AFB	Community Communications, LLC	Classic country
KHWC-LP	94.7 FM	Harrison	Harrison K-12 School District No. 23	Variety
KIBG	100.7 FM	Bigfork	Anderson Radio Broadcasting Inc	Adult hits
KIEF-LP	101.5 FM	Three Forks	Church of the Hard Rock	Variety
KIKC	1250 AM	Forsyth	Miles City, Forsyth	Country
KIKC-FM	101.3 FM	Forsyth	Miles City, Forsyth	Country
KIKF	104.9 FM	Cascade	Staradio Corp.	Country
KIMO	107.3 FM	Townsend	The Montana Radio Company, LLC	Country
KINX	102.7 FM	Fairfield	Staradio Corp.	News/Talk
KISN	96.7 FM	Belgrade	Townsquare License, LLC	Top 40 (CHR)
KJCB	88.9 FM	Lockwood	CSN International, Inc.	Christian
KJCG	88.3 FM	Missoula	Hi-Line Radio Fellowship, Inc.	Religious
KJCR	1240 AM	Billings	Agnus Dei Communications	Catholic
KJFK-LP	101.9 FM	Hot Springs	Our Evolution Radio	Variety
KJFT	90.3 FM	Arlee	CSN International	Religious (CSN International)
KJJM	100.5 FM	Baker	Newell Media, LLC	Classic rock
KJJR	880 AM	Whitefish	Bee Broadcasting, Inc.	News/Talk
KJLF	90.5 FM	Butte	Hi-Line Radio Fellowship, Inc.	Religious
KJPZ	104.1 FM	East Helena	Hi-Line Radio Fellowship, Inc.	Christian
KJZS-LP	106.3 FM	Bozeman	Grace Bible Church Limited of Bozeman, MT	Religious Teaching
KKBR	97.1 FM	Billings	Townsquare License, LLC	Hot adult contemporary
KKGR	680 AM	East Helena	Kgr, LLC	Classic hits
KKMT	92.3 FM	Ronan	Anderson Radio Broadcasting Inc	Top 40 (CHR)
KKQX	105.7 FM	Manhattan	Silver Star Communications, Inc.	Classic rock
KKVU	104.5 FM	Stevensville	Missoula Broadcasting Company, LLC	Adult top 40
KLAN	93.5 FM	Glasgow	Glasgow Media Group, LLC	Hot adult contemporary
KLBZ	89.3 FM	Bozeman	Educational Media Foundation	Contemporary Christian (K-Love)
KLCB	1230 AM	Libby	Lincoln County Broadcasters, Inc.	Country
KLEU	91.1 FM	Lewistown	Hi-Line Radio Fellowship, Inc.	Religious
KLFM	92.9 FM	Great Falls	Townsquare License, LLC	Classic hits
KLKM	88.7 FM	Kalispell	Educational Media Foundation	Contemporary Christian (K-Love)
KLMB	99.9 FM	Klein	Bill Edwards	Community radio
KLMT	89.3 FM	Billings	Western Inspirational Broadcasters, Inc.	Religious
KLRV	90.9 FM	Billings	Educational Media Foundation	Contemporary Christian (K-Love)
KLSK	100.3 FM	Great Falls	Educational Media Foundation	Contemporary Christian (K-Love)
KLTZ	1240 AM	Glasgow	Glasgow Media Group, LLC	Country
KLYQ	1240 AM	Hamilton	Anderson Radio Broadcasting, Inc.	News/Talk
KMBM	90.7 FM	Polson	Divine Mercy Apostolate	Catholic
KMBR	95.5 FM	Butte	Townsquare License, LLC	Classic rock
KMCJ	99.5 FM	Colstrip	Hi-Line Radio Fellowship, Inc.	Religious
KMEA-LP	92.7 FM	Bozeman	Galatin Christian Education Station	Religious (Radio 74 Internationale)
KMEH-LP	100.1 FM	Helena	Montana Ethical Hackers	
KMGT	90.3 FM	Circle	Circle Community Radio Association	High school radio
KMHK	103.7 FM	Billings	Townsquare License, LLC	Classic rock
KMMR	100.1 FM	Malta	KMMR Radio, Inc.	Country
KMMS	1450 AM	Bozeman	Townsquare License, LLC	News/Talk
KMMS-FM	94.7 FM	Bozeman	Townsquare License, LLC	Adult album alternative
KMON	560 AM	Great Falls	Townsquare License, LLC	Classic country
KMON-FM	94.5 FM	Great Falls	Townsquare License, LLC	Country
KMPT	930 AM	East Missoula	Townsquare License, LLC	Conservative talk
KMSM-FM	103.9 FM	Butte	Desert Mountain Broadcasting Licenses LLC	Active rock
KMSO	102.5 FM	Missoula	Sheila Callahan & Friends, Inc.	Hot adult contemporary
KMTA	1050 AM	Miles City	Custer County Community Broadcasting Corporation	Oldies
KMTJ	90.5 FM	Columbus	Hi-Line Radio Fellowship, Inc.	Religious
KMTX	105.3 FM	Helena	The Montana Radio Company, LLC	Adult contemporary
KMTZ	107.7 FM	Walkerville	Townsquare License, LLC	Adult hits
KMXE-FM	99.3 FM	Red Lodge	Silver Rock Communications Inc.	Adult hits
KMXM	102.3 FM	Helena Valley Northeast	The Montana Radio Company, LLC	Top 40 (CHR)
KMZL	91.1 FM	Missoula	Faith Communications Corp	Religious
KMZO	90.3 FM	Hamilton	Faith Communications Corp	Religious
KNEH-LP	97.3 FM	Helena	Helena Community Educational Association	Christian
KNMC	90.1 FM	Havre	Northern Montana College	College radio
KNPC	88.5 FM	Hardin	Hi-Line Radio Fellowship Inc.	Religious
KNPH	89.3 FM	Havre	Hi-Line Radio Fellowship, Inc.	Religious
KNPM	91.5 FM	Miles City	Hi-Line Radio Fellowship, Inc.	Religious
KNPS	91.7 FM	Scobey	Hi-Line Radio Fellowship, Inc.	Religious
KOBB-FM	93.7 FM	Bozeman	Desert Mountain Broadcasting Licenses LLC	Classic hits
KODH-LP	91.1 FM	Garryowen	Center Pole, Inc.	Variety/Native American
KOFI	1180 AM	Kalispell	KOFI, Inc	News/Talk/Oldies
KOFK-FM	88.1 FM	Bozeman	Guild of St. Peter Educational Association	Catholic (Relevant Radio)
KOJM	610 AM	Havre	New Media Broadcasters	Classic hits
KOLK	94.3 FM	Lakeside	KOFI, Inc.	Country
KOPR	94.1 FM	Butte	Butte Broadcasting, Inc.	Adult hits
KOZB	97.5 FM	Livingston	Desert Mountain Broadcasting Licenses LLC	Rock
KPJH	89.5 FM	Polson	University of Montana	Public radio
KPLG	91.5 FM	Plains	Hi-Line Radio Fellowship, Inc.	Religious
KPLN	106.7 FM	Lockwood	Desert Mountain Broadcasting Licenses, LLC	Hot adult contemporary
KPQX	92.5 FM	Havre	New Media Broadcasters, Inc.	Country
KPRK	1340 AM	Livingston	Townsquare License, LLC	Talk
KPWS-LP	93.1 FM	Manhattan	Manhattan School District #3	Variety
KPWY	90.7 FM	West Yellowstone	Hi-Line Radio Fellowship Inc.	Religious
KQDE	1340 AM	Evergreen	Anderson Radio Broadcasting Inc	Urban contemporary
KQDI	1450 AM	Highwood	Staradio Corp.	News/Talk
KQDI-FM	106.1 FM	Great Falls	Staradio Corp.	Active rock
KQEZ	99.3 FM	St. Regis	Anderson Radio Broadcasting, Inc.	Adult contemporary
KQLG-LP	100.5 FM	Billings	Billings Christian Radio	Christian
KQLJ-LP	105.5 FM	Roundup	Roundup Christian Broadcasting	Christian
KQLR	89.7 FM	Whitehall	Educational Media Foundation	Contemporary Christian (K-Love)
KQLW-LP	97.7 FM	Lewistown	Lewistown Christian FM	Christian
KQOV-LP	98.5 FM	Butte	Queen of Victory Educational Radio Association	Catholic
KQPZ	95.9 FM	Lewistown	Montana Broadcast Communications, Inc.	Mainstream rock
KQQM	88.3 FM	Miles City	Radio 74 Internationale	Religious (Radio 74 Internationale)
KQRK	99.7 FM	Pablo	Anderson Radio Broadcasting Inc	Country
KQRV	96.9 FM	Deer Lodge	Butte Broadcasting Incorporated	Soft oldies
KRKX	94.1 FM	Billings	Desert Mountain Broadcasting Licenses, LLC	Country
KRPM	107.5 FM	Billings	BMG Billings, LLC	Country
KRSQ	101.9 FM	Laurel	BMG Billings, LLC	Top 40 (CHR)
KRVO	103.1 FM	Columbia Falls	Rose Communications, Inc.	Hot adult contemporary
KRWS-LP	100.7 FM	Hardin	Greater Hardin Association	Variety
KRYK	101.3 FM	Chinook	New Media Broadcasters, Inc.	Hot adult contemporary
KRZN	96.3 FM	Billings	Desert Mountain Broadcasting Licenses, LLC	Active rock
KSCY	106.9 FM	Four Corners	Silver Star Communications, Inc.	Country
KSEN	1150 AM	Shelby	Townsquare License, LLC	Oldies
KSJG-LP	105.5 FM	Lewistown	Saint Joseph Radio, Inc.	Catholic
KSMR-LP	97.1 FM	Great Falls	Saint Michael Radio, Inc.	Catholic
KSMZ-LP	101.9 FM	Missoula	Saint Michael Communication	Catholic
KSPL	90.9 FM	Kalispell	The Moody Bible Institute of Chicago	Religious
KTFZ	88.1 FM	Thompson Falls	University of Montana	
KTGC-LP	101.3 FM	St. Regis	St. Regis Public School	Variety
KTHC	95.1 FM	Sidney	Townsquare License, LLC	Hot adult contemporary
KTNY	101.7 FM	Libby	Lincoln County Broadcasters, Inc.	Soft oldies
KUDI	88.7 FM	Choteau	Hi-Line Radio Fellowship, Inc.	Contemporary Christian
KUFL	90.5 FM	Libby	University of Montana	Public radio
KUFM	89.1 FM	Missoula	University Of Montana	Public radio
KUFN	91.9 FM	Hamilton	University Of Montana	Public radio
KUHM	91.7 FM	Helena	University Of Montana	Public radio
KUKL	89.9 FM	Kalispell	University Of Montana	Public radio
KUMD	90.9 FM	Deer Lodge	University of Montana	Public radio
KUMS	89.7 FM	White Sulphur Springs	University of Montana	Public radio
KUMW	91.7 FM	Dillon	University of Montana	Public radio
KURL	93.3 FM	Billings	Elenbaas Media, Inc	Religious
KVCK	1450 AM	Wolf Point	Wolftrax Broadcasting, LLC	Classic hits
KVCK-FM	92.7 FM	Wolf Point	Wolftrax Broadcasting, LLC	Country
KVCM	103.1 FM	Helena	Hi-Line Radio Fellowship, Inc.	Religious
KVVR	97.9 FM	Dutton	Townsquare License, LLC	Adult contemporary
KWEP-LP	103.7 FM	Elk Park	Jefferson County Disaster & Emergency Services	Emergency Info
KWGF	101.7 FM	Vaughn	Staradio Corp.	Top 40 (CHR)
KWLG-LP	105.9 FM	Montana City	Jefferson County Disaster & Emergency Services	Emergency Info
KWLY-LP	104.9 FM	Missoula	Water of Life Radio	Christian
KWMY	105.9 FM	Joliet	Desert Mountain Broadcasting Licenses, LLC	Classic hits
KWOL-FM	105.1 FM	Whitefish	Rose Communications, Inc.	Classic hits
KWYS	920 AM	West Yellowstone	Radio West, LLC	Oldies
KXDR	106.7 FM	Pinesdale	Anderson Radio Broadcasting, Inc.	Classic rock
KXEH	88.7 FM	Victor	Hi-Line Radio Fellowship, Inc.	Religious
KXEI	95.1 FM	Havre	Hi-Line Radio Fellowship, Inc.	Religious
KXEM	88.1 FM	Roundup	Hi-Line Radio Fellowship, Inc.	Religious
KXGF	1400 AM	Great Falls	Staradio Corp.	Sports (FSR)
KXGN	1400 AM	Glendive	Glendive Broadcasting Corp.	Adult contemporary
KXLB	100.7 FM	Churchill	Townsquare License, LLC	Country
KXLO	1230 AM	Lewistown	KXLO Broadcast, Inc.	Country
KXTL	1370 AM	Butte	Townsquare License, LLC	Talk
KXZI-LP	101.9 FM	Kalispell	The Cross Works Ministries	Jazz/Blues/Folk/Bluegrass
KYJK	105.9 FM	Missoula	Missoula Broadcasting Company, LLC	Adult hits
KYLT	1340 AM	Missoula	Anderson Radio Broadcasting, Inc.	Adult standards
KYMI	97.5 FM	Charlo	Spanish Peaks Broadcasting, Inc.	Worship music (Air1)
KYPB	89.3 FM	Big Timber	Montana State University – Billings	Public radio
KYPC	89.9 FM	Colstrip	Montana State University – Billings	Public radio
KYPF	89.5 FM	Stanford	Montana State University – Billings	Public radio
KYPH	88.5 FM	Helena	Montana State University – Billings	Public radio
KYPM	89.9 FM	Livingston	Montana State University – Billings	Public radio
KYPR	90.7 FM	Miles City	Montana State University – Billings	Public radio
KYPW	88.3 FM	Wolf Point	Montana State University – Billings	Public radio
KYPX	106.5 FM	Helena Valley SE	Montana State University Billings	Public radio
KYPZ	96.1 FM	Fort Benton	Montana State University Billings	Public radio
KYSS-FM	94.9 FM	Missoula	Townsquare License, LLC	Country
KYSX	105.1 FM	Billings	BMG Billings, LLC	Classic rock
KYUS-FM	92.3 FM	Miles City	Custer County Community Broadcasting Corporation	Adult hits
KYWL	1480 AM	Belgrade	Desert Mountain Broadcasting Licenses, LLC	Sports
KYYA	730 AM	Billings	Desert Mountain Broadcasting Licenses, LLC	Oldies
KZBN	90.3 FM	Bozeman	Bozeman Christian Education Station, Inc.	Religious (Radio 74 Internationale)
KZIN-FM	96.7 FM	Shelby	Townsquare License, LLC	Country
KZLM	107.9 FM	Harlowton	Hi-Line Radio Fellowship, Inc.	Christian
KZMN	103.9 FM	Kalispell	KOFI, Inc	Classic rock
KZMT	101.1 FM	Helena	The Montana Radio Company, LLC	Classic rock
KZMY	103.5 FM	Bozeman	Townsquare License, LLC	Hot adult contemporary
KZOQ-FM	100.1 FM	Missoula	Townsquare License, LLC	Classic rock
KZXT	93.5 FM	Eureka	Anderson Radio Broadcasting, Inc.	Adult contemporary

== Defunct ==
- KANA
- KBCK
- KBOQ
- KCTB-FM, Cut Bank, 1983–1989
- KDYS
- KFRW
- KOBB
- KTZZ
- KHSI-LP
