= Mass media in Billings, Montana =

The Billings metropolitan area is served by two major news television stations, four major non-news television stations, one community television station, 25 commercial radio stations and one major daily newspaper.

== Television ==
The following television stations are licensed to, and broadcast from, the Billings media market:

=== Full-power ===
- 2 KTVQ Billings (MTN/CBS, Independent on 2.2)
- 4 KHMT Hardin (Fox)
- 6 KSVI Billings (ABC, The CW on 6.2)
- 8 KULR-TV Billings (NBC)
- 16 KBGS-TV Billings (Montana PBS/PBS)

=== Low-power ===
- 14 KHKR-LD Billings (MeTV)
- 43 KQHD-LD Hardin
- 45 K19LB-D Billings
- 51 K31NN-D Billings

== Newspapers ==
=== Billings Gazette ===
The Billings Gazette was first published in 1885 and has since grown to become the largest newspaper in Montana and Northern Wyoming. The Billings Gazette is published as a daily newspaper and also publishes Billings Business, Thrifty Nickel, Magic City Magazine, Montana Land Magazine, Welcome Home, and Lifewise to target niche audiences. The Billings Gazette is currently owned by Lee Enterprises.

=== Yellowstone County News ===
The Yellowstone County News is a weekly newspaper which was first published in 1977 by Dave and Jan Willms from their home in Ballantine, Montana. It covers a wide variety of topics and issues each week including news from the Yellowstone County Commissioners and other public government meetings, as well as hyperlocal news pertaining to the geographic area of Yellowstone County. It was owned by Pete Robison and Rebecca Tescher-Robison from 1993 to 2014. In 2014, Yellowstone County News was purchased by Jonathan McNiven and Tana McNiven, who own and operate the newspaper currently.

=== Billings Outpost ===
Founded in 1997, Billings Outpost was a weekly newspaper, distributed in Billings and nearby municipalities. It was edited and published by David Crisp. Its publication was suspended on January 28, 2016.

=== The Billings Times ===
The Billings Times was a weekly legal/statistical newspaper established in 1891. The newspaper reported on legal publications and also reported vital statistics, such as births, deaths, and marriages, in the Yellowstone County Area. It also advertised all major city contracts for the City of Billings. From 1960 onward, the newspaper was operated by the Turner family. It ceased in 2024.

=== Last Best News ===
Last Best News was an online news site that covered Billings, Montana.

== Radio ==
=== FM ===
- 89.3 KLMT Billings (Christian/Pilgrim Radio)
- 90.9 KLRV Billings (K-Love)
- 91.7 KEMC Billings (Yellowstone Public Radio/NPR)
- 94.1 KRKX Billings (Country)
- 95.5 KCHH Worden (Talk radio)
- 96.3 KRZN Billings (Modern rock)
- 97.1 KKBR Billings (Contemporary hit radio)
- 98.5 KEWF Billings (Country)
- 101.1 KFHW-LP Billings (Community radio)
- 101.9 KRSQ Laurel (Contemporary hit radio)
- 102.9 KCTR-FM Billings (Country)
- 103.7 KMHK Billings (Classic rock)
- 105.1 KYSX Billings (Country)
- 105.9 KWMY Joliet (Classic hits)
- 106.7 KPLN Lockwood (Modern hits)
- 107.5 KRPM Billings (Adult Contemporary)

=== AM ===
- 730 KYYA Billings (Oldies)
- 790 KGHL Billings (Classic country)
- 910 KBLG Billings (Sports radio)
- 970 KBUL Billings (Talk radio)
- 1230 KHDN Hardin (Talk radio)
- 1240 KJCR Billings (Contemporary Christian)
