= Coburn Hill =

Mountain in Montana, United States of America

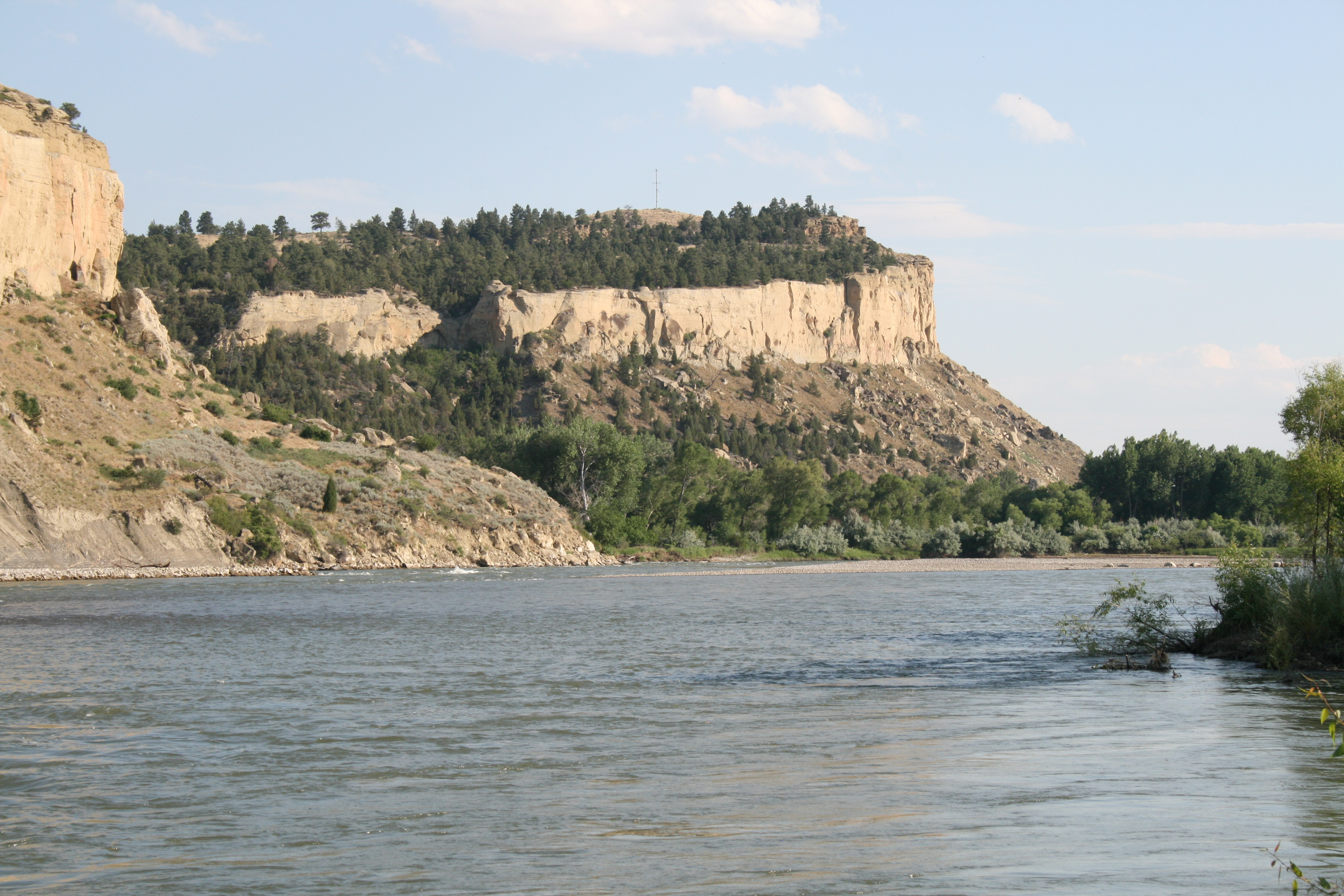
- Sacrifice Cliff from across the Yellowstone River.

Highest point
- Elevation: 3,563 ft (1,086 m)
- Coordinates: 45°45′54″N 108°27′25″W

Geography
- Location within Montana
- Location: Yellowstone County, Montana, U.S.

Climbing
- Easiest route: Access Road

Coburn Hill is located 4.2 miles (7 km) southeast of Billings, Montana in Yellowstone County. Its most predominant feature is Sacrifice Cliffs, part of the Rimrocks surrounding the city. Another feature is several radio and television broadcast towers located on the hill.

== Broadcast towers ==
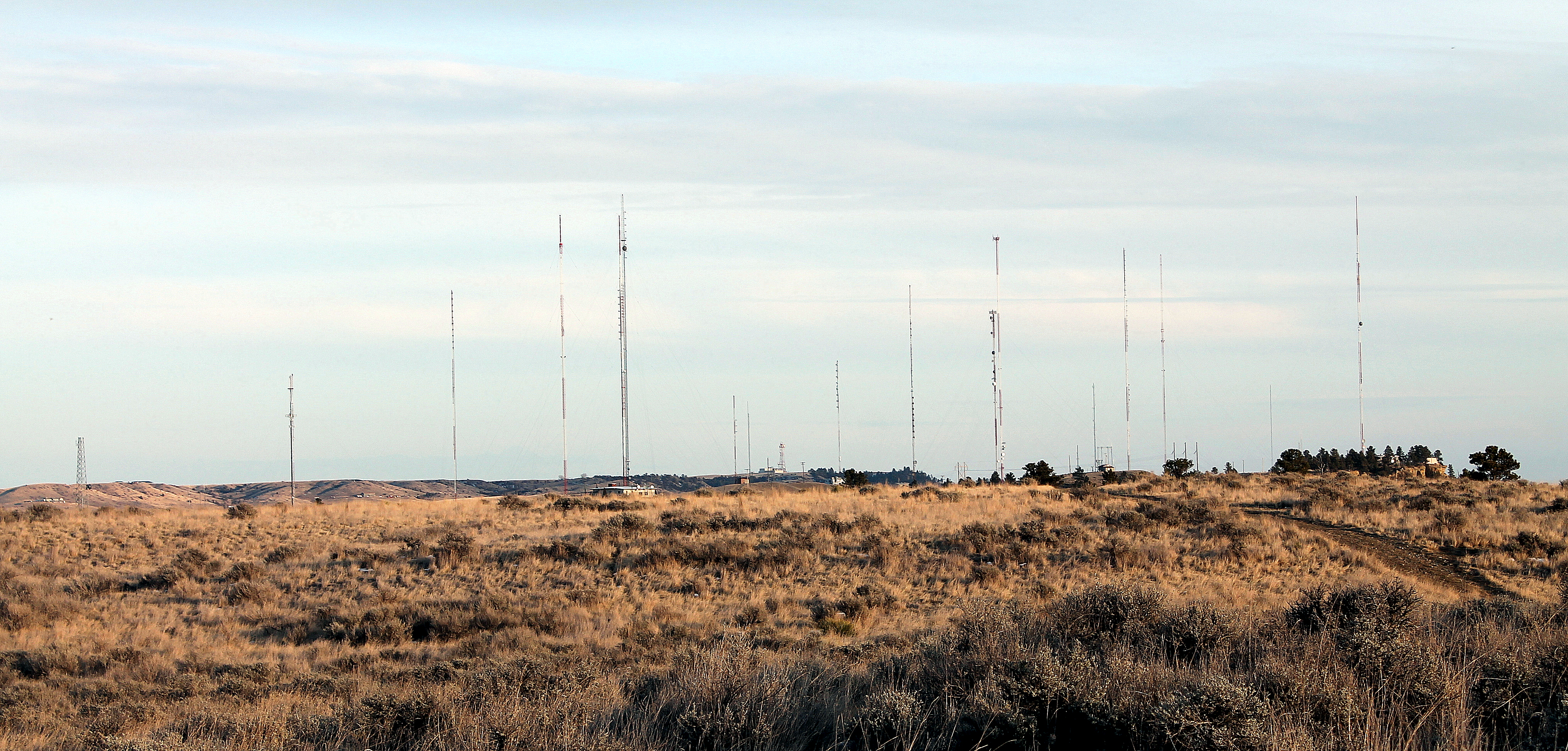
The radio and television tower farm on Coburn Hill in 2013.

Nearly all of Billings FM radio stations transmit from towers on Coburn Hill. The following radio stations, in order of frequency, broadcast from the hill: KLMT 88.9 FM, KBLW 90.1 FM, K213DY 90.5 FM, KLRV 90.9 FM, K217CM 91.3 FM, KBXI 92.5 FM, KURL 93.3 FM, KRZN 96.3 FM, KKBR 97.1 FM, K248BL 97.5 FM, KRSQ 101.9 FM, KCTR 102.9 FM, KMHK 103.7 FM, KYSX 105.1 FM, KPLN 106.7 FM, KRPM 107.5 FM. Coburn Hill also carries a majority of Billings area television stations. KTVQ, KULR, KBGS, and a number of translators and lower powered stations have towers on the mountain.

Coburn Hill is also the site of a Sulfur dioxide monitoring station operated by the Department of Environmental Quality.

== Four Dances Natural Area ==
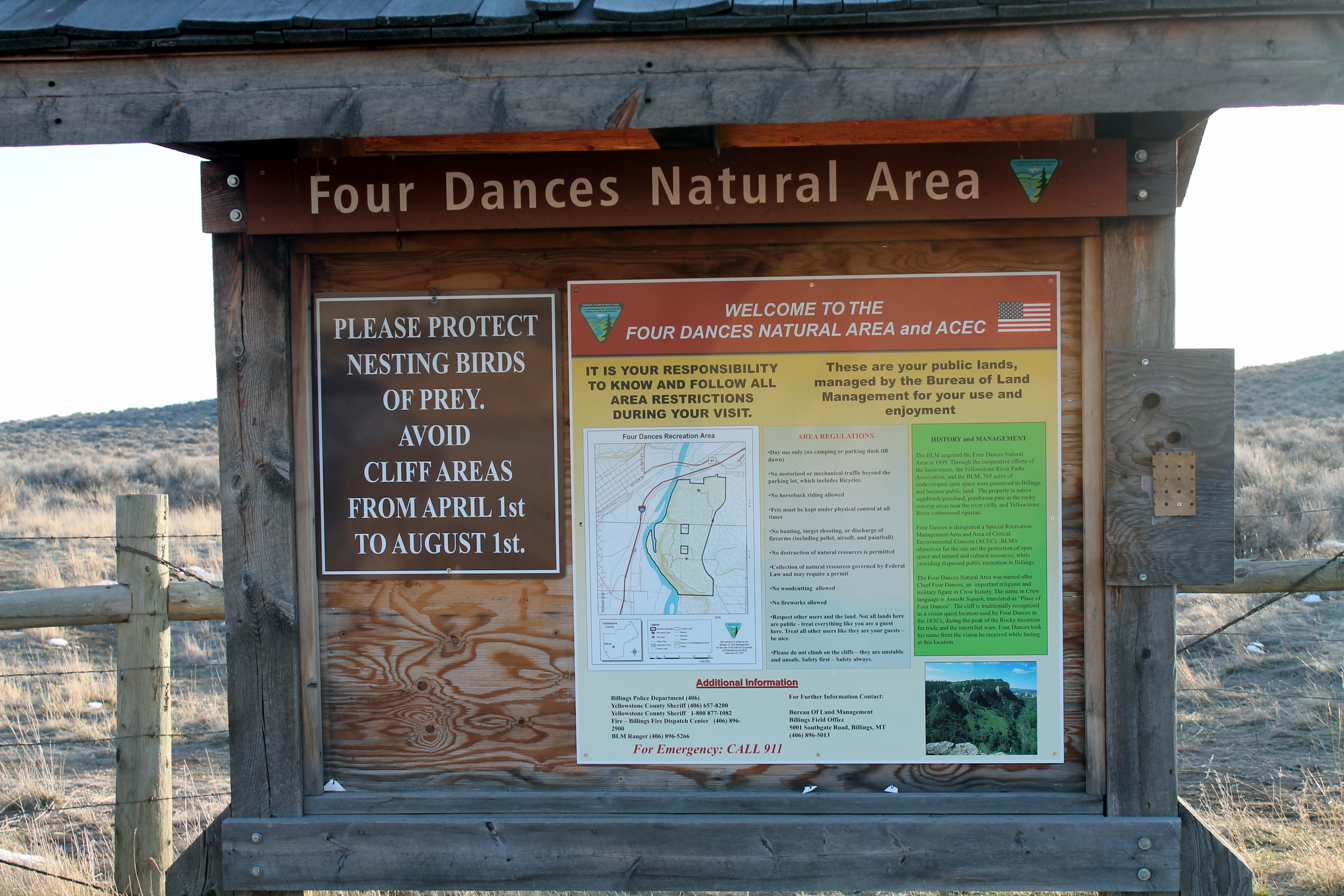
Four Dances Natural Area

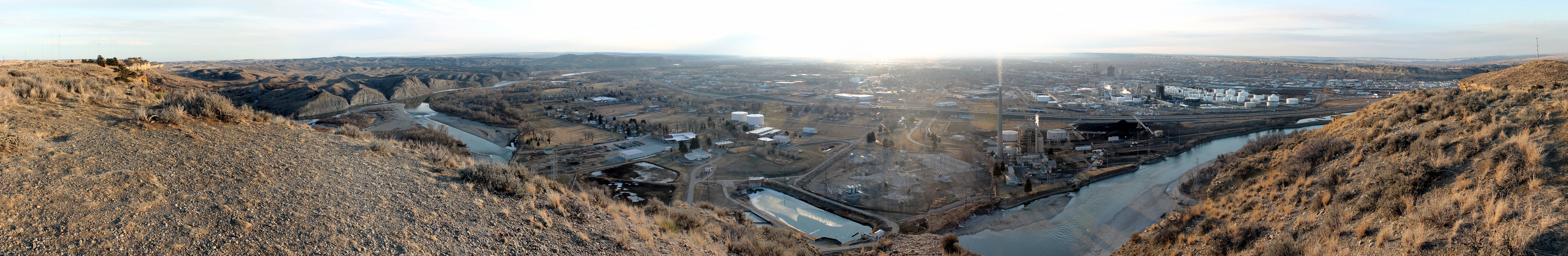
The Billings metropolitan area from Sacrifice Cliffs and Coburn Hill.

Providing an overlook of the greater Billings area, the southern portion of Coburn Hill is home to the Four Dances Natural Area, operated by the BLM. The BLM acquired Four Dances Natural Area in 1999. The area sits on 765 acres of undeveloped space which includes Sacrifice Cliffs. The area is named after Chief Four Dances, a Crow Indian chief. According to a sign on site, the area was used by Four Dances in the 1830s as a vision quest location. The area is also a frequent nesting location for various birds of prey.
