= KGHL (AM) =

Radio station in Billings, Montana

- Billings, Montana; United States
- Broadcast area: Billings metropolitan area
- Frequency: 790 kHz
- Branding: The Mighty 790 AM & 94.7 FM KGHL

Programming
- Format: Classic country
- Affiliations: CBS News Radio; Compass Media Networks; United Stations Radio Networks

Ownership
- Owner: KGHL Radio, LLC

History
- First air date: June 8, 1928

Technical information
- Licensing authority: FCC
- Facility ID: 50354
- Class: B
- Power: 5,000 watts day; 1,800 watts night
- Transmitter coordinates: 45°49′28.8″N 108°24′40.5″W
- Translator: 94.7 K234CP (Billings)

Links
- Public license information: Public file; LMS
- Webcast: Listen live
- Website: mighty790.com

KGHL (790 kHz) is an AM radio station broadcasting a classic country format licensed to Billings, Montana, United States. The station is owned by KGHL Radio LLC, which is owned by the Northern Broadcasting System and features programming from CBS News Radio, Compass Media Networks, and United Stations Radio Networks. KGHL's studios and offices are located in the Northern Broadcasting building on First Avenue North in downtown Billings; the transmitter is in Lockwood.

KGHL was the first radio station in Billings and remained dominant into the 1980s.

== History ==
=== Billings's first, Billings's only ===
The Northwestern Auto Supply Company opened KGHL, broadcasting initially on 1350 kHz, on the evening of June 8, 1928; the first announcer heard over the station was Eric Thornton, who served as program director and was hired from KOIL in Council Bluffs, Iowa. The highlight of the inaugural program was a remote address by Governor John E. Erickson, speaking from the state capital of Helena; the equipment to enable the governor to deliver his remarks over the station was flown from Billings to Helena earlier that day in hazardous conditions, landing with an empty gasoline tank. Original studios for the station were located on the third floor of the auto supply company's building in downtown Billings; with limited room, some bands played on the roof. Northwestern had begun selling radios in 1924, but without a local station, they found sales and radio demonstrations difficult in the Billings area, where only one station was reliably received, KFKX at Hastings, Nebraska. KGHL was not the first radio station to operate in the state of Montana—that distinction belongs to KFBB (now KEIN) in Great Falls, Montana—but its arrival marked the beginning of a new era in broadcasting in the state with the 1928 commissioning of a new 568-foot (173 m) self-supporting tower, one of the tallest in the United States at that time. The tower stood for 72 years until being demolished in 2020. In 1929 KGHL brought the first network radio programming to Montana when it aired the NBC broadcast of Herbert Hoover's inauguration.

Over the course of the 1930s and 1940s, KGHL grew substantially. After General Order 40 had assigned the station a new frequency of 950 kHz, it raised its power to 500 watts in 1929 and then to 1,000 watts in 1930. The second power increase also included a transmitter move to a site outside of the city. The next year, it became a full NBC affiliate, with the ability to air programming from NBC's Red and Blue networks or its then-separate Gold and Orange circuits on the West Coast. In 1934, the station was allowed to operate experimentally on 780 kHz, which was extended until becoming permanent in 1936. Further technical boosts came later in the 1930s with a final power increase to 5,000 watts in 1938. NARBA moved KGHL, and other stations on 780, to 790 kHz.

=== New competition, new owners ===
KGHL stood alone in Billings for the first 18 years of its existence. In 1946, station KBMY (1230 AM) was established by the Billings Broadcasting Corporation, and 1951 brought KOOK (970 AM), owned by the Montana Network. The new competition prompted original owner Campbell to quit, and he sold KGHL to the Walter Schott Company of Cincinnati in 1952, along with the auto supply company, a 300-acre (120 ha) farm at the KGHL transmitter site, and a 26,000-acre (11,000 ha) cattle ranch. Schott renamed the Northwestern Auto Supply Company to Northwestern Industries in 1953.

Northwestern sold KGHL in 1954 to the Midland Empire Broadcasting Company for $270,000; the four principals of Midland hailed from the oil and gas industry. Midland Empire immediately moved to apply for a television station; in November 1955, the Federal Communications Commission granted it a construction permit for channel 8, and after prevailing against court challenges to the grant, KGHL-TV signed on March 15, 1958. New quarters at 214 N. 30th Street were constructed for the combined radio-TV operation.

In 1962, Midland Empire sold KGHL radio and television to Crain-Snyder Television of Great Falls; KGHL-TV changed its call letters to KULR-TV upon Crain-Snyder taking over on January 1, 1963. As part of the deal, the new owners immediately spun off the radio station to the Copper Broadcasting Company, owned by George C. Hatch. The sale brought KGHL its first radio sister stations in the state, KOPR in Butte and KMON in Great Falls. Additionally, the station moved its studios to the transmitter site.

Hatch built and signed on an FM sister station to KGHL, KBMS (98.5 FM), in August 1977. In 1984, KGHL began broadcasting in AM stereo.

=== Sunrise Montana ownership ===
After more than 20 years, Hatch sold KGHL and the FM station, then known as KIDX, for $3 million in 1985 to Dick Elliot. Elliot had previously become general manager of the two stations in 1982 before stepping down to buy two stations in his hometown of Salt Lake City. By this time, KGHL had become a country music outlet, which dominated the ratings in Billings and earned national honors for stations in its market size.

Elliot moved the stations' studios and offices out of the transmitter site and to a business park along Interstate 90. During his ownership, KGHL ratings sank as music listening move to FM. In 1986, the station posted a 31.4 percent share of the market, nearly double the nearest competitor; three years later, however, Arbitron showed KGHL in a tie for second with just 12.2 percent share as three FM stations gained ground: contemporary stations KYYA (93.3 FM) and KZLS (97.1 FM) and country KCTR-FM 102.9.

=== KGHL in the 1990s ===
In 1991, Pegasus Broadcasting Company of Helena, whose CEO was Chris Brennan, purchased KGHL-KIDX from Elliot. The president of Pegasus, Dan Snyder, was the same Snyder that had purchased then-KGHL-TV in 1962. Pegasus also took over the operations of KKUL AM 1230/FM 95.5, which were at the time owned by the First Security Bank of Livingston. In March 1992, 95.5 became KGHL-FM and entered into a simulcast with 790 AM.

In early 1993, KGHL-FM dropped the call letters and rebranded as KDWG "The Dawg" in an attempt to go after KCTR "Cat Country". ("The Dawg" moved to 98.5 FM later in the year as part of a frequency swap between it and KIDX's long-running Magic adult contemporary format.)

As The Dawg established itself on FM, KGHL became a news/talk outlet by 1995, when Brennan placed his Montana radio holdings under the control of the One on One Sports network, which he headed. The next year, the station picked up play-by-play of the Colorado Rockies baseball team. Brennan sold his AM-FM pairs in Billings and Helena to American Cities Broadcasting in 1997 for $3 million, by which time KGHL had moved back to a classic country format. After acquiring KRSQ, then at 101.7 FM, American Cities sold its Billings cluster to New Northwest Broadcasters in 1999.

=== Northern Broadcasting ownership ===
New Northwest continued to own KGHL until 2009, when its entire five-station Billings cluster was spun off to company president and CEO Pete Benedetti. Benedetti sold KGHL, its lone AM, to KGHL Radio, LLC, in 2011, retaining a 30 percent stake in the new licensee; Benedetti retained the separately programmed KGHL-FM, which changed its call letters to KEWF as a condition of the sale. The majority owners of KGHL Radio, Taylor and Shannon Brown, integrated the station with the Northern Ag Network, a syndicator of farm news to stations, which they also owned; Brown grew up listening to KGHL as a child in Sand Springs.

== FM translator ==
In 2016, Taylor Brown acquired K234CP, an FM translator at 94.7 FM, to rebroadcast KGHL on the FM band; it was moved to Billings from Columbus.

Broadcast translator for KGHL
Call sign	Frequency	City of license	FID	ERP (W)	HAAT	Class	Transmitter coordinates	FCC info
K234CP	94.7 FM	Billings	146157	250	0 m (0 ft)	D	45°45′31.83″N 108°27′9.48″W	LMS
