= KGHL =

KGHL may refer to:

- KGHL (AM), a radio station (790 AM) licensed to serve Billings, Montana, United States
- KEWF, a radio station (98.5 FM) licensed to serve Billings, Montana, which held the call sign KGHL-FM from 1999 to 2011
- KCHH, a radio station (95.5 FM) licensed to serve Worden, Montana, which held the call sign KGHL-FM from 1992 to 1993
