= KMON =

KMON may refer to:

- KMON (AM), a radio station (560 AM) licensed to Great Falls, Montana, United States
- KMON-FM, a radio station (94.5 FM) licensed to Great Falls, Montana, United States
