= KYWL =

KYWL may refer to:

- KYWL (AM), a radio station (1490 AM) licensed to serve Bozeman, Montana, United States
- KQDE, a radio station (1340 AM) licensed to serve Evergreen, Montana, which held the call sign KYWL from 2016 to 2017
- KBBD, a radio station (103.9 FM) licensed to serve Spokane, Washington, United States, which held the call sign KYWL from 2001 to 2004
