= KYLW =

Radio station in Lockwood, Montana, United States (2004–2018)

- Lockwood, Montana; United States
- Broadcast area: Billings Metropolitan Area
- Frequency: 1450 kHz

Ownership
- Owner: Sun Mountain, Inc.
- Sister stations: KBSR, KHDN

History
- First air date: October 28, 2004
- Last air date: November 29, 2018

Technical information
- Facility ID: 129384
- Class: C
- Power: 1,000 watts (unlimited)
- Transmitter coordinates: 45°49′29″N 108°24′40″W

KYLW (1450 AM) was a radio station licensed to Lockwood, Montana, United States. The station served the Billings area. The station was owned by Sun Mountain, Inc.

== History ==
On November 28, 2016, KYLW returned to the air with a rhythmic contemporary format, branded as "Wild 104.5" (simulcast on FM translator K283CP Billings).

KYLW's license was canceled on April 26, 2017, for not fully paying debts it owed to the Federal Communications Commission (FCC).

KYLW filed a Petition for Reconsideration on May 26, 2017, which was granted on June 9, 2017. The renewal application and license authorization were also granted, and the callsign was reinstated on June 9, 2017.

Due to the loss of its licensed transmitter site, on April 26, 2017, KYLW requested special temporary authority to operate with an emergency antenna and reduced power from an alternate site location. The request was granted on June 14, 2017.

On November 29, 2018, KYLW was taken off the air and its license was deleted by the FCC because it had no tower and was broadcasting illegally for years, along with sister station KBSR.

== Previous logos ==
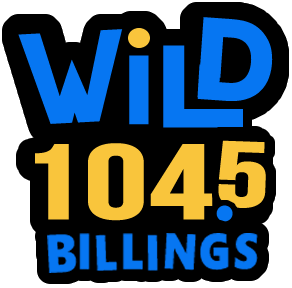
