= KBSR =

Radio station in Laurel, Montana (1979–2018)

Laurel, Montana; United States
- Broadcast area: Billings Metropolitan Area
- Frequency: 1490 kHz

Programming
- Format: Defunct
- Affiliations: Cumulus Media Networks, Westwood One

Ownership
- Owner: Sun Mountain, Inc.
- Sister stations: KHDN, KYLW

History
- First air date: 1979
- Last air date: November 29, 2018
- Former call signs: KBSO (1987–1989); KFBN (1989–1990)
- Call sign meaning: "Big Sky Radio"

Technical information
- Facility ID: 5297
- Class: C
- Power: 1,000 watts unlimited
- Transmitter coordinates: 45°39′11″N 108°45′9″W

KBSR (1490 AM) was a radio station licensed to Laurel, Montana, United States. The station served the Billings, Montana, area.

== History ==
The station was assigned the call letters KBSO on July 10, 1987. On June 17, 1989, the station changed its call sign to KFBN, then again on September 3, 1990 to KBSR. Due to the loss of its tower, the station used a special temporary authority to broadcast 0.02 kW from an alternate site near Laurel. The antenna would be a "half wavelength" long wire antenna attached to the existing facilities.

On November 29, 2018, KBSR was taken off the air and its license was deleted by the FCC because it had no tower and was broadcasting illegally for years, along with sister station KYLW.
