= KHTC =

KHTC may refer to:

- KHTC (AM), a radio station (1490 AM) licensed to serve Malmstrom Air Force Base, Montana, United States
- KMWA, a radio station (96.3 FM) licensed to serve Edina, Minnesota, United States, which held the call sign KHTC from 2010 to 2012
