= KBCK =

KBCK may refer to:

- KBCK (FM), a radio station (95.9 FM) licensed to Columbia Falls, Montana, United States
- KBCK (AM), a radio station (1400 AM) formerly licensed to Deer Lodge, Montana, which held the call sign from 2002 to 2022
- KNRS-FM, a radio station (105.9 FM) licensed to Centerville, Utah, United States, which held the call sign KBCK from 1990 to 1992
- The ICAO airport code for Black River Falls Area Airport
