= KBLG =

Radio station in Billings, Montana

Billings, Montana; United States
- Broadcast area: Billings Metropolitan Area
- Frequency: 910 kHz
- Branding: ESPN 910 KBLG

Programming
- Format: Sports
- Affiliations: ESPN Radio; Billings Mustangs; Billings Outlaws

Ownership
- Owner: Desert Mountain Broadcasting; (Desert Mountain Broadcasting Licenses, LLC)
- Sister stations: KRKX, KPLN, KRZN, KWMY, KYYA

History
- First air date: October 19, 1955 (as KOYN)
- Former call signs: KOYN (1955–1986)
- Call sign meaning: K BiLlinGs

Technical information
- Licensing authority: FCC
- Facility ID: 63873
- Class: D
- Power: 1,000 watts day 64 watts night
- Transmitter coordinates: 45°45′13″N 108°30′58″W
- Translator: 105.5 K288HA (Billings)

Links
- Public license information: Public file; LMS
- Webcast: Listen live
- Website: espn910.com

KBLG (910 AM, "ESPN 910 KBLG") is an American sports radio station that broadcasts in the Billings Metro Area. KBLG broadcasts from its tower located just outside the Billings city limits.

== History ==
The station traces its roots to October 19, 1955. The initial call letters of the station were KOYN, and the station was owned by Meyer Broadcasting Company. It carried a country format. The studios and transmitter were located at 4900 Riverside Drive in Billings. The station was licensed for 1,000 watts. KOYN had an FM sister station sign on in 1969, which eventually became KURL. KBLG was sold to R&R Broadcasting in 1977. In the 1980s, the station carried an oldies format.

== Ownership ==
In June 2006, KBLG was acquired by Cherry Creek Radio from Fisher Radio Regional Group as part of a 24 station deal with a total reported sale price of $33.3 million.

KBLG was owned by Cherry Creek Radio until 2010 when it was acquired by Connoisseur Media along with sister stations KRZN-FM and KRKX-FM.

For the remaining Cherry Creek Radio station KYYA-FM, it was announced on May 24, 2010, that the frequency of 93.3 FM would be operated by Elenbaas Media Inc, while Elenbaas's 730 AM frequency would be operated by Connoisseur Media.

In February 2013, KBLG signed a multi-year agreement with Grizzly Sports Properties to broadcast all University of Montana football and men's basketball games to Billings listeners.

The station has won awards in the past for its news coverage.

Logo before translator sign on

On May 7, 2019, Connoisseur Media announced that it would sell its Billings cluster to Desert Mountain Broadcasting, an entity formed by Connoisseur Billings general manager Cam Maxwell. The sale closed on August 2, 2019.
