= Evergreen School District No. 50 =

School district in Montana, United States

Evergreen School District No. 50 is the public school district for Evergreen, Montana. The school district occupies three buildings.

East Evergreen Elementary School is located at 585 East Evergreen Drive, approximately one mile east of Highway 2. The school serves Early Kindergarten through Fourth grade students. The school has four Kindergarten classes, four First grade classes, four Second grade classes, two Third grade classes, and three Fourth grade classes. The school also has a library, gymnasium facility, music room, computer lab, and two special education classes for students of various needs. The east school site comprises 8.12 acres.

Evergreen Junior High School (Grades 5 - 8) is near the administration building at the corner of Highway 2 and West Evergreen Drive. The junior high school site consists of 20.94 acres.

The administration building is located at 18 West Evergreen Drive, Kalispell, Montana. It houses the office of the superintendent, special services, and the Evergreen Crossroads Program.
