= KMXE-FM =

Radio station in Red Lodge–Billings, Montana

- Red Lodge, Montana; United States
- Broadcast area: Billings Metropolitan Area
- Frequency: 99.3 MHz
- Branding: FM 99.3 The Mountain

Programming
- Format: Adult hits

Ownership
- Owner: Silver Rock Communications Inc.

History
- First air date: March 15, 1994

Technical information
- Licensing authority: FCC
- Facility ID: 60408
- Class: C1
- ERP: 30,000 watts
- HAAT: 369 meters (1,211 ft)
- Transmitter coordinates: 45°11′39″N 109°20′30″W

Links
- Public license information: Public file; LMS
- Webcast: Listen live
- Website: fm99mtn.com

KMXE-FM is a commercial radio station in Red Lodge, Montana, broadcasting on 99.3 FM. It is owned by Silver Rock Communications in Red Lodge, and airs an adult hits music format, branded as “The Mountain”.

The studios are at 9 South Broadway, Red Lodge. The transmitter and its 1,200 feet (370 m) tower are off Ski Run Road, west of Red Lodge. The tower, the 4th highest in the state of Montana, reaches 11 counties in Montana and Wyoming.
