= KOFI =

- Kalispell, Montana; United States
- Broadcast area: Kalispell-Flathead Valley area
- Frequency: 1180 kHz
- Branding: 1180 AM 104.3 FM KOFI

Programming
- Format: Oldies - News - Talk - Sports
- Network: ABC News Radio
- Affiliations: Westwood One; Premiere Networks

Ownership
- Owner: KOFI, Inc.
- Sister stations: KOLK, KZMN

History
- First air date: November 11, 1955
- Former frequencies: 980 kHz (1955–1964)

Technical information
- Licensing authority: FCC
- Facility ID: 35368
- Class: B
- Power: 50,000 watts (days); 10,000 watts (nights)
- Transmitter coordinates: 48°11′51.9″N 114°15′6.5″W
- Translator: 104.3 K282BP (Kalispell)

Links
- Public license information: Public file; LMS
- Webcast: Listen live
- Website: kofiradio.com

KOFI (1180 AM) is a commercial radio station licensed to Kalispell, Montana, and owned by KOFI, Inc. It airs an oldies radio format with some news, talk and sports programs. KOFI carries syndicated talk shows at night, including Rick Valdes-America at Night and Coast to Coast AM with George Noory. It also airs Denver Broncos football during the NFL season.

By day, KOFI is powered at 50,000 watts non-directional, the maximum for commercial AM stations. But 1180 AM is a clear channel frequency reserved for Class A station WHAM Rochester, New York. To prevent interference, at night KOFI reduces power to 10,000 watts and uses a directional antenna. The transmitter site is in Evergreen, on Steel Bridge Road. The studios and offices are on First Avenue East in Kalispell. Programming is also heard on 250-watt FM translator K282BP at 104.3 MHz.

== History ==
The station officially signed on the air on November 11, 1955, originally broadcasting on 980 kHz as a 1,000-watt daytime-only station. In 1958, KOFI increased its power to 5,000 watts, though it remained restricted to daylight hours to prevent interference with distant stations In September 1964, the station changed its frequency to 930 kHz. A major turning point occurred in 1968 when the station migrated to its current frequency of 1180 kHz, allowing for 10,000 watts of full-time operation and a significantly expanded broadcast footprint.

For over five decades, the station's identity was synonymous with George Ostrom, a legendary Montana broadcaster who joined in 1956 and became a household name for his local news and storytelling. Ostrom retired from KOFI in 2008, though later returned to the airwaves at Kalispell station KGEZ from 2011 to 2017. Eventually, KOFI boosted its daytime power to 50,000 watts, the maximum allowed for commercial AM stations in the United States, earning it the reputation as the most powerful radio signal in Northwest Montana. Because 1180 AM is a clear-channel frequency, the station reduces its power to 10,000 watts at night to protect WHAM in Rochester, New York, though its signal can still be heard as far away as Washington and Utah.

Since 2017, KOFI's broadcasts are simulcast on 104.3 FM, using a 240-watt FM translator.

In late 2024, an application was filed to transfer control of KOFI, Inc. from David and Tana Rae to new owners Donald Walter and Scott L. Davis. Tragedy struck the station on November 9, 2024, when a devastating fire completely destroyed the 50,000-watt transmitter building in Evergreen, forcing the station to temporarily broadcast at low power. Despite the loss of the main AM facility, the station continued to reach listeners via its FM translator, K282BP, which broadcasts on 104.3 MHz. The station quickly ordered a new 1,000-watt transmitter to serve as a sustainable "bridge" while the primary facility was rebuilt.
