= KEIN =

Radio station in Great Falls, Montana

- Great Falls, Montana; United States
- Broadcast area: Great Falls area
- Frequency: 1310 kHz
- Branding: 13 KEIN

Programming
- Format: Comedy
- Affiliations: Today's Comedy

Ownership
- Owner: Wayne Ferree and Creed Evans; (Tiger Butte Broadcasting, Inc.)

History
- First air date: August 22, 1922 (Havre, as KFBB); September 30, 1929 (Great Falls)
- Former call signs: KFBB (1922–1969); KKGF (1969–1972)
- Call sign meaning: Phonetically pronounced as "keen".

Technical information
- Licensing authority: FCC
- Facility ID: 56664
- Class: B
- Power: 5,000 watts day 1,000 watts night
- Transmitter coordinates: 47°31′20″N 111°23′18″W

Links
- Public license information: Public file; LMS
- Website: KEIN Online

KEIN (1310 AM) is a comedy formatted radio station licensed to Great Falls, Montana, United States and serving the Great Falls area. The station is currently owned by Wayne Ferree & Creed Evans, through licensee Tiger Butte Broadcasting, Inc., and features programming from Today's Comedy. It was first licensed as KFBB in July 1922, and is Montana's oldest radio station.

== History ==
KEIN was first licensed on July 11, 1922, to the F. A. Buttery & Company department store in Havre, Montana, with the sequentially issued call letters of KFBB. It made its debut broadcast on the evening of August 22, 1922. The station originally broadcast on the standard "entertainment" wavelength of 360 meters (833 kHz).

In late 1928 KFBB was assigned to 1360 kHz, sharing time with KGIR (now KXTL) in Butte. In the fall of 1929, KFBB moved to Great Falls, making its debut broadcast there on September 30, 1929. The station moved to 1280 kHz in early 1930, and now no longer had to share time with any other stations. In March 1941, under the provisions of the North American Regional Broadcasting Agreement, stations on 1280 kHz were moved as a group to 1310 kHz, which has been the station's assignment up to the present.

In 1969 KFBB's call letters were changed to KKGF, and three years later they became KEIN.

Beginning in 2011 the station was off the air for an extended period of time. In January, property owner Creed Evans reported that someone had broken into the transmitter building and switched off the breakers, killing the signal. Munson Radio president Steve Dow held the license for KEIN, but was unable to make repairs because he was locked out of the transmitter building, as part of an October 2010 court order giving him 30 days to vacate the premises. This was the result of a court suit initiated by Evans against Dow, who was found to have failed to keep insurance and to maintain the facility.

In the intervening years a series of documents were filed with the FCC to someday resume on-air operations, including a filing granted April 24, 2014. FCC records showed the station back on the air as of that date. Effective May 18, 2018, the station was placed into receivership as part of a judgement obtained by Creed Evans against Munson Radio, Inc. The FCC assigned the station's license to Steve J. Fitzpatrick, Esq., Receiver effective November 15, 2018. The station was transferred out of receivership to Tiger Butte Broadcasting, Inc. effective September 24, 2019.

In January 2021, KEIN changed their format from oldies to comedy, branded as "13 KEIN", with the slogan "Montana's Comedy Network".
