= KIBG =

- Bigfork, Montana; United States
- Broadcast area: Kalispell-Flathead Valley area
- Frequency: 100.7 MHz
- Branding: The Big 100

Programming
- Format: Variety hits
- Affiliations: SRN News

Ownership
- Owner: Anderson Radio Broadcasting, Inc.
- Sister stations: KERR, KKMT, KQDE, KQRK

History
- First air date: August 16, 1996
- Former call signs: KSIL (1996–2004)
- Call sign meaning: Big

Technical information
- Licensing authority: FCC
- Facility ID: 83460
- Class: C
- ERP: 85,000 watts
- HAAT: 646 meters (2,119 ft)
- Transmitter coordinates: 47°33′44″N 115°50′33″W
- Translator: 103.5 K278BI (Kalispell)

Links
- Public license information: Public file; LMS
- Webcast: Listen live
- Website: thebig100.com

KIBG (100.7 FM) is a radio station broadcasting a variety hits format. Licensed to Bigfork, Montana, United States, the station serves the Kalispell-Flathead Valley area. The station is currently owned by Anderson Radio Broadcasting, Inc.

== History ==
The frequency was originally allotted to the community of Wallace, Idaho by the Federal Communications Commission as a first-come / first served radio channel. In 1996, Scott Parker's Alpine Broadcasting, Ltd. of Ketchum, Idaho filed an application for a construction permit, then built and licensed the station at Wallace. The original call letters were KSIL (1996-08-16), to represent "Silver" - given the area's silver mining history. Parker later moved the station to Bigfork, Montana and sold the station in 1999 to its current owner, Dennis Anderson's Anderson Radio Broadcasting, Inc. of Polson, Montana. On 2004-03-25 the station became the current KIBG.
