= Evergreen, Montana =

Unincorporated community in Montana, United States

- Census-designated place
- Location of Evergreen, Montana
- Coordinates: 48°14′05″N 114°15′26″W
- Country: United States
- State: Montana
- County: Flathead

Area
  - Total: 8.77 sq mi (22.72 km^{2})
  - Land: 8.55 sq mi (22.15 km^{2})
  - Water: 0.22 sq mi (0.57 km^{2})
- Elevation: 2,923 ft (891 m)

Population (2020)
  - Total: 8,149
  - Density: 952.8/sq mi (367.88/km^{2})
- Time zone: UTC-7 (Mountain (MST))
  - Summer (DST): UTC-6 (MDT)
- ZIP code: 59901
- Area code: 406
- FIPS code: 30-25075
- GNIS feature ID: 2408098

Evergreen is a census-designated place (CDP) in Flathead County, Montana, United States. Its population was 8,149 at the 2020 census, up from 7,616 at the 2010 census, and 6,215 in 2000.

Evergreen is a suburb of Kalispell, the county seat.

== Geography ==
Evergreen is located in central Flathead County on the northeast side of Kalispell. It is bordered to the east by the Flathead River, and the Whitefish River flows through the western side of the CDP.

According to the United States Census Bureau, the Evergreen CDP has a total area of 8.8 square miles (22.8 km^{2}), of which 8.6 square miles (22.3 km^{2}) is land and 0.2 square miles (0.5 km^{2}), or 2.32%, is water.

=== Climate ===
This climatic region is typified by large seasonal temperature differences, with warm to hot (and often humid) summers and cold (sometimes severely cold) winters. According to the Köppen Climate Classification system, Evergreen has a humid continental climate, abbreviated "Dfb" on climate maps.

== Demographics ==
Historical population
| Census | Pop. | Note | %± |
|---|---|---|---|
| 2020 | 8,149 | | — |
U.S. Decennial Census

=== 2020 census ===
As of the 2020 census, Evergreen had a population of 8,149. The median age was 38.8 years. 23.4% of residents were under the age of 18 and 17.1% of residents were 65 years of age or older. For every 100 females there were 100.0 males, and for every 100 females age 18 and over there were 99.8 males age 18 and over.

90.8% of residents lived in urban areas, while 9.2% lived in rural areas.

There were 3,181 households in Evergreen, of which 29.9% had children under the age of 18 living in them. Of all households, 46.9% were married-couple households, 20.0% were households with a male householder and no spouse or partner present, and 24.2% were households with a female householder and no spouse or partner present. About 26.3% of all households were made up of individuals and 12.3% had someone living alone who was 65 years of age or older.

There were 3,356 housing units, of which 5.2% were vacant. The homeowner vacancy rate was 1.1% and the rental vacancy rate was 5.7%.

Racial composition as of the 2020 census
| Race | Number | Percent |
|---|---|---|
| White | 7,224 | 88.6% |
| Black or African American | 23 | 0.3% |
| American Indian and Alaska Native | 133 | 1.6% |
| Asian | 53 | 0.7% |
| Native Hawaiian and Other Pacific Islander | 14 | 0.2% |
| Some other race | 99 | 1.2% |
| Two or more races | 603 | 7.4% |
| Hispanic or Latino (of any race) | 275 | 3.4% |

=== Income and poverty ===
The median income for a household in the CDP was $59,338, and the per capita income for the past 12 months was $24,527. The number of people in poverty was 7.4%.

== Government ==
Being unincorporated, Evergreen does not have a local government. Instead, the Flathead County Board of Commissioners provides governmental oversight for the community.

== Education ==
The Evergreen Elementary District educates students from kindergarten through 8th grade. In the 2021–2022 school year the district had 702 students enrolled. Two school are in the district: East Evergreen School instructs students from kindergarten through 4th grade while Evergreen Junior High has 5th to 8th grade students.

Students in 9th through 12th grade attend Glacier High School. In the 2021–2022 school year there were 1,430 students enrolled.

== Media ==
The AM radio station KQDE is licensed in Evergreen. It broadcasts an urban contemporary music format.

== Infrastructure ==
U.S. Route 2 passes through the community from north to south. It runs northeast 29 miles (47 km) to West Glacier, at the entrance to Glacier National Park. The center of Kalispell is 4 miles (6 km) southwest of Evergreen via US 2 and U.S. Route 93. Montana Highway 35 leads southeast from Evergreen 20 miles (32 km) to Bigfork.

Glacier Park International Airport provides commercial air service.

== See also ==
- List of census-designated places in Montana
