= KLFM =

- Great Falls, Montana; United States
- Broadcast area: Great Falls area
- Frequency: 92.9 MHz
- Branding: KOOL 92.9

Programming
- Format: Classic hits
- Affiliations: Westwood One

Ownership
- Owner: Townsquare Media; (Townsquare License, LLC)
- Sister stations: KAAK, KMON, KMON-FM, KVVR

History
- First air date: February 14, 1982
- Call sign meaning: KooL FM

Technical information
- Licensing authority: FCC
- Facility ID: 56665
- Class: C1
- ERP: 100,000 watts
- HAAT: 125 meters (410 ft)
- Transmitter coordinates: 47°32′19″N 111°15′41″W

Links
- Public license information: Public file; LMS
- Webcast: Listen Live
- Website: kool929fm.com

KLFM (92.9 FM) is a radio station broadcasting a classic hits format. Licensed to Great Falls, Montana, United States, the station serves the Great Falls area. The station is currently owned by Townsquare Media

On April 10, 2017, KLFM changed its format from classic rock to classic hits, branded as "Kool 92.9".
