= KAAR =

Radio station in Butte, Montana

- Butte, Montana; United States
- Frequency: 92.5 MHz

Programming
- Format: Country
- Affiliations: Compass Media Networks; Westwood One

Ownership
- Owner: Townsquare Media; (Townsquare License, LLC)
- Sister stations: KMBR, KMTZ, KXTL

History
- First air date: November 1, 1988
- Former call signs: KJLF (1988–1993)

Technical information
- Licensing authority: FCC
- Facility ID: 63877
- Class: C1
- ERP: 4,500 watts
- HAAT: 550 meters
- Transmitter coordinates: 46.008°N 112.443°W

Links
- Public license information: Public file; LMS
- Webcast: Listen Live
- Website: 925kaar.com

KAAR (92.5 MHz) is a commercial radio station in Butte, Montana. KAAR airs a country music format.

KAAR and its sister stations are all located at 750 Dewey Blvd. in Butte. The rear of this radio facility houses the small studios of local NBC affiliate KTVM Channel 6. KAAR and KMBR share a transmitter site northeast of town, east of Interstate 15. 92.5 KAAR FM was first implemented in 1992 by Bob Toole, who at the time, served as General Manager of Fisher Radio in Butte. In 2002, Fisher acquired broadcaster Tom O'Neill as KAAR FM's morning DJ and Program Director. O'Neill has commanded the KAAR & KMBR air waves for over 20 years, and has successfully impacted listenership. In early 2019, KAAR FM ranked #1 in the Nielsen Ratings.

== History ==
The station began broadcasting on November 1, 1988, under the original call sign KJLF. It was later acquired by Sunbrook Communications, which also operated KXTL and KQUY in the Butte market, and the call letters were changed to KAAR in 1993. In June 2006, KAAR was acquired by Cherry Creek Radio from Fisher Radio Regional Group as part of a 24-station deal with a total reported sale price of $33.3 million.

== Ownership ==
Effective June 17, 2022, KAAR was acquired by Townsquare Media from Cherry Creek Radio as part of a 42 station/21 translator deal with a sale price of $18.75 million. The total sale price for the acquisition was $18.75 million, a transaction that significantly expanded Townsquare's footprint in markets outside the Top 50 in the United States.
