= KKMT =

- Ronan, Montana; United States
- Broadcast area: Kalispell-Polson
- Frequency: 92.3 MHz
- Branding: Star 92

Programming
- Format: Top 40 (CHR)

Ownership
- Owner: Anderson Radio Broadcasting, Inc.
- Sister stations: KIBG, KQRK, KERR, KQDE

History
- First air date: 1979 (as KQRR)
- Former call signs: KQRR (1979–1985); KQRK (1985–2013)
- Former frequencies: 99.7 MHz (1979)-(2013)
- Call sign meaning: Kalispell, MT (postal code for Montana)

Technical information
- Licensing authority: FCC
- Facility ID: 2205
- Class: C
- ERP: 60,000 watts
- HAAT: 707 meters (2,320 ft)
- Transmitter coordinates: 47°46′25″N 114°16′04″W
- Translators: 95.3 K237GF (Kalispell); 104.7 K284CV (Whitefish, relays HD4); 105.7 K289CF (Kalispell)

Links
- Public license information: Public file; LMS
- Webcast: Listen Live
- Website: star92hits.com

KKMT (92.3 FM, "Star 92") is a radio station licensed to serve the cities of Ronan and Kalispell in Montana. The station is owned by Anderson Radio Broadcasting, Inc. It airs a Top 40 (CHR) format.

The station was assigned the KKMT call letters by the Federal Communications Commission on July 5, 2006.

On July 3, 2013, KKMT and its CHR format moved from 99.7 FM Pablo, Montana to 92.3 FM Ronan, Montana, swapping frequencies with country-formatted KQRK.
