= KMTZ =

Radio station in Walkerville, Montana

- Walkerville, Montana; United States
- Broadcast area: Butte, Montana
- Frequency: 107.7 MHz
- Branding: 107.7 Dave FM

Programming
- Format: Adult hits

Ownership
- Owner: Townsquare Media; (Townsquare License, LLC)
- Sister stations: KAAR, KMBR, KXTL

History
- First air date: 1998

Technical information
- Licensing authority: FCC
- Facility ID: 166087
- Class: C2
- ERP: 2,600 watts
- HAAT: 563 meters
- Transmitter coordinates: 46°00′24″N 112°26′30″W

Links
- Public license information: Public file; LMS
- Webcast: Listen Live
- Website: dave1077.com

KMTZ (107.7 FM) is a radio station in Butte, Montana. Owned by Townsquare Media, it broadcasts an adult hits format branded as "107.7 Dave FM".

The station was assigned the KMTZ call sign by the Federal Communications Commission on June 1, 2006.

On April 5, 2017, Montana Radio Company announced that it would sell KMTZ to Cherry Creek Radio. Following the completion of the sale on July 28, 2017, the previously silent station went on the air as 107.7 Dave FM.

Effective June 17, 2022, Cherry Creek Radio sold KMTZ, along with 41 other stations and 21 translators, to Townsquare Media for $18.75 million.
