= Jefferson County Radio =

Radio network in Montana, United States

Jefferson County Radio is a network of seven low-power FM radio stations in Jefferson County, Montana, United States. Owned and operated by Jefferson County Disaster & Emergency Services, the stations air classic country music and emergency messages and public interest items for residents of the county.

== Transmitters ==
Call sign	Frequency	City	Facility ID	ERP W	Height m	Transmitter coordinates
KBAS-LP	98.3 MHz	Basin	134663	100	-182.107	46°16′17″N 112°15′48″W
KEAC-LP	106.1 MHz	Cardwell	134668	1	441	45°55′15″N 112°1′15″W
KEAJ-LP	100.3 MHz	Jefferson City (Note: The community of license is Cell Site, Montana.)	134669	100	-25.846	46°24′9″N 112°0′11″W
KEME-LP	105.9 MHz	Boulder	134665	100	-133.557	46°12′55.1″N 112°6′42.5″W
KESW-LP	106.5 MHz	Whitehall	134811	100	-58.669	45°52′12″N 112°6′42.5″W
KWEP-LP	103.7 MHz	Elk Park	134671	100	-137	46°5′21″N 112°25′17″W
KWLG-LP	105.9 MHz	Montana City	134809	100	-33.829	46°32′12″N 111°56′28″W
