= KJCR (AM) =

Radio station in Billings, Montana

Billings, Montana; United States
- Broadcast area: Billings Metropolitan Area
- Frequency: 1240 kHz

Programming
- Format: Catholic talk radio
- Affiliations: EWTN Radio

Ownership
- Owner: Agnus Dei Communications

History
- First air date: October 17, 1946
- Former call signs: KBMY; KZBO (1989–1990); KUUS (1990–1993); KMAY (1993–1997); KMZK (1997–2011)
- Call sign meaning: Jesus Christ the Redeemer

Technical information
- Licensing authority: FCC
- Facility ID: 41600
- Class: C
- Power: 1,000 watts
- Transmitter coordinates: 45°45′29″N 108°29′52″W
- Translators: 97.5 K248BL (Billings); 100.9 K265FK (Laurel)

Links
- Public license information: Public file; LMS
- Webcast: Listen Live
- Website: billingscatholicradio.com

KJCR (1240 kHz) is an AM radio station licensed to Billings, Montana, United States. The station is currently owned by Agnus Dei Communications.

Former logo

== History ==
KJCR received a construction permit on February 13, 1946 as KBMY. The station came on air on September 8, 1946, but would not receive a license to cover until October 17, 1946. It was Billing's second radio station. The transmitter was located near US Highway 10, about two miles from the "business district" in Billings. At the time, the station was only allowed to broadcast 250 watts. The station received approval to broadcast 1,000 watts in 1962. It was owned by Billings Broadcasting Company. KBMY left the air on September 30, 1983, because of financial issues. The station returned in 1989 as KZBO, and then KUUS, with the slogan "KWS". In 1993, the station was a part of the now-defunct May School of Broadcasting, and the calls were changed to KMAY. The station was sold to Elenbaas Media in 1990, who flipped the call sign to KMZK in 1997.

As KMZK, the station was owned by Herm Elenbaas and carried Contemporary Christian music. Herm Elenbaas also owns KURL 93.3 FM.

The station became Catholic radio in 2011, after it was sold to Agnus Dei Communications. The studios are located at 26 Wyoming Avenue. Efforts to get the station on air began in 2007. The station broadcasts the entire lineup of EWTN Radio, but also broadcasts Billings Central Catholic High School football games. During the early 2010s, the station broadcast using HD Radio.
