= KQRK =

Coordinates: 47.774°N 114.269°W

- Pablo, Montana; United States
- Broadcast area: Kalispell-Flathead Valley, Montana
- Frequency: 99.7 MHz
- Branding: Q Country 99.7

Programming
- Format: Country

Ownership
- Owner: Anderson Radio Broadcasting
- Sister stations: KKMT, KIBG, KERR, KQDE

History
- First air date: 2006
- Former call signs: KKMT (2006–2013)

Technical information
- Licensing authority: FCC
- Facility ID: 165376
- Class: C2
- ERP: 1,800 watts
- HAAT: 644 meters (2,113 ft)

Links
- Public license information: Public file; LMS
- Website: qcountry997.com

KQRK (99.7 FM, "Q Country 99.7") is a commercial radio station in Pablo, Montana, United States, broadcasting to the Kalispell-Flathead Valley area of Montana. KQRK airs a country music format.

== History ==
The KQRK call letters started on 92.3 FM. On July 3, 2013 KQRK and its country format moved from 92.3 FM Ronan, Montana to 99.7 FM Pablo, Montana, swapping frequencies with CHR-formatted KKMT.
