= KULR-TV =

Television station in Billings, Montana

- Billings, Montana; United States
- Channels: Digital: 11 (VHF); Virtual: 8
- Branding: NonStop Local Billings

Programming
- Affiliations: 8.1: NBC; 8.2: SWX Right Now

Ownership
- Owner: Cowles Company; (Cowles Montana Media Company)

History
- First air date: March 15, 1958
- Former call signs: KGHL-TV (1958–1963)
- Former channel numbers: Analog: 8 (VHF, 1958–2009)
- Former affiliations: ABC (1963–1987, secondary until 1969)
- Call sign meaning: "Color"; as in Color television

Technical information
- Licensing authority: FCC
- Facility ID: 35724
- ERP: 16 kW
- HAAT: 191 m (627 ft)
- Transmitter coordinates: 45°45′35.5″N 108°27′17.4″W
- Translator(s): See § Translators

Links
- Public license information: Public file; LMS
- Website: www.nonstoplocal.com/billings/

KULR-TV (channel 8) is a television station in Billings, Montana, United States, affiliated with NBC and owned by the Cowles Company. The station's studios are located on Overland Avenue in the Homestead Business Park section of Billings, and its transmitter is located on Coburn Hill southeast of downtown.

KULR-TV was the second TV station on the air in Billings; it began broadcasting as KGHL-TV, co-owned with KGHL radio, on March 15, 1958. The station was renamed KULR-TV in 1963 when it was separated from the radio stations. It was an ABC affiliate from 1969 to 1987, when it returned to NBC. KULR-TV was purchased by Max Media in 2004 and by Cowles in 2013. Since the late 1980s, its newscasts have been a distant second-place finisher to KTVQ.

== History ==
The first channel 8 construction permit was awarded on November 21, 1952, to the Rudman-Hayutin Television Company, a consortium of two oil producers. M. B. Rudman surrendered other permits he owned with Hayutin in North Dakota in September 1953 in order to concentrate on the proposed Billings station, but after the company failed to respond to a letter from the Federal Communications Commission (FCC) inquiring as to progress in construction, the FCC canceled the permit in March 1954.

=== KGHL-TV: Early years ===
The Midland Empire Broadcasting Company, owner of Billings radio station KGHL (790 AM), applied to the FCC in September 1955 for channel 8. The FCC granted the application on November 23, but it stayed the grant after KOOK-TV (channel 2), the city's other TV station, protested to the commission. In August, FCC hearing examiner James D. Cunningham recommended a grant of the Midland Empire application, noting that while the addition of a second station would cause some economic damage to KOOK-TV, the Billings market could sustain two stations.

The FCC lifted the stay on construction of KGHL-TV on April 19, 1957. Midland Empire Broadcasting Company officials announced they would begin construction immediately on studios co-located with the radio station on Broadway. However, the company instead decided to build new facilities on North 30th Street to house both stations; the KGHL-TV transmitter was also built southeast of Billings. KGHL-TV began broadcasting on March 15, 1958, as an affiliate of NBC.

=== KULR-TV ===
Midland Empire Broadcasting sold KGHL-AM-TV to Crain-Snyder Television in 1962; Crain-Snyder immediately spun KGHL radio off to George C. Hatch, retaining KGHL-TV. It was decided to let the older radio station keep the KGHL call letters; On January 1, 1963, coinciding with the change in ownership, KGHL-TV became KULR-TV; both halves of the newly split operation made plans to leave the 30th Street site, with channel 8 relocating to studios at the transmitter site on Coburn Hill. KULR also added a secondary affiliation with ABC in 1963.

Paul Crain, one of the two principals in Crain-Snyder Television, died at the age of 43 in 1964. Two years later, Crain-Snyder sold KULR-TV to the Harriscope Broadcasting Corporation, which owned KFBB-TV in Great Falls and KTWO-TV in Casper, Wyoming; the FCC approved of the $350,000 purchase in March 1967.

Harriscope agreed in 1967 to change the primary network affiliation for KULR-TV and KFBB-TV in Great Falls to ABC at the end of each station's existing affiliation contract; KULR's switch took effect January 1, 1969, at which point NBC was relegated to secondary status. Even though it was a primary ABC affiliate, ABC's evening network newscast was not aired until 1971, when Harriscope began airing the ABC and NBC evening newscasts on KULR-TV and KTWO-TV in Casper. By later in the 1970s, KTVQ had first call rights to NBC shows, with KULR-TV having secondary choice; in 1979, KTVQ aired 10 prime time shows from NBC and KULR another five. In 1980, some NBC programs moved to the newly built KOUS-TV (channel 4), though it was not until 1982 that NBC had a primary affiliate again in Billings.

KULR-TV announced in 1983 that the station would relocate to a new building in the Homestead Business Park that would provide upgraded technical facilities and twice the space for its 40 employees; the structure was completed in 1984.

=== Dix, Max, and Cowles ownership ===
Harriscope sold KULR-TV and KTWO-TV in Casper to Dix Communications in 1986 for $12.2 million. At a time when NBC was stronger than ABC, in January 1987, KULR initiated an affiliation switch to NBC, with KOUS-TV picking up ABC; the switch took effect that August. Dix also was early to begin digital broadcasting from its stations despite their small market size, with KULR-DT beginning operations on May 6, 2002.

Dix Communications sold KULR-TV, along with KFBB-TV in Great Falls, to Max Media on June 16, 2004, for $12.25 million. Dix chairman Robert Dix said that the sale made sense, as KULR and KFBB were the company's last two television stations. On September 30, 2013, the Cowles Company announced that it would acquire Max Media's Montana television station cluster (comprising KULR and ABC affiliates KWYB in Butte, KFBB-TV in Great Falls, KHBB-LD in Helena and KTMF in Missoula) for $18 million. The sale was completed on November 29.

== News operation ==
KULR-TV was the traditional news leader in Billings prior to the late 1980s, having something of an edge in ratings surveys as early as the late 1970s. The station was on top for most of the 1980s, sometimes attracting twice as many or more households as channel 2, which analysts attributed to the more folksy approach taken by "Straight 8" in comparison with KTVQ's newscasts and the popularity of anchorman and news director Dave Rye. KULR did have the market's first female news co-anchor, Chris Chesrown, and it was the first station in the state to maintain a full-time state capital reporter in Helena. Future Montana senator Conrad Burns worked for KULR-TV as a farm broadcaster in the 1980s.

However, changes at KTVQ were eventually successful in unseating KULR. In 1984, a major overhaul of the Montana Television Network's regional news format shifted the center of the network from Great Falls to Billings. Ratings started to climb, though it was not until KTVQ replaced unpopular anchorman Dean Phillips with Montana native Gus Koernig that it surpassed KULR-TV in viewership. Rye departed channel 8 in 1990 and successfully ran for the Montana State Senate, returning to KULR after the legislature's 1993 session. Rye's return failed to restore KULR to ratings leadership as KTVQ continued to hold a two-to-one viewership advantage for its newscasts. In 2001, the station realigned its early evening newscasts from one local program at 5:30 p.m. to separate 5 and 6 p.m. half-hours, by which time the 5:30 newscast was being beaten three-to-one by KTVQ.

In October 2022, its newscasts were rebranded as NonStop Local as part of a group-wide rebranding by Cowles.

=== Notable former on-air staff ===
- Monica Gayle – weekend anchor/reporter, later at CBS News
- Steve Savard – reporter and weekend anchor, 1989–1990

== Technical information ==
=== Subchannels ===
KULR-TV's transmitter is located on Coburn Hill southeast of downtown Billings. The station's signal is multiplexed:

Subchannels of KULR-TV
Subchannel	Res.	Short name	Programming
8.1	1080i	KULR-HD	NBC
8.2	1080i	KULRSWX	SWX Right Now

In February 2009, the four commercial stations in the Billings market were refused FCC permission to end analog broadcasts and operate as digital-only effective on the originally-scheduled February 17, 2009, date.

=== Translators ===
KULR-TV is rebroadcast on translators across Montana and several communities in Wyoming:

- Ashland: K10AC-D
- Bridger, etc.: K35JW-D
- Broadus: K06AA-D
- Cody, WY: K25OV-D
- Colstrip: K09OY-D, K26OX-D
- Columbus: K24FL-D
- Emigrant: K21MA-D
- Forsyth: K14RV-D, K31NW-D, K33MC-D
- Harlowton: K13BE-D
- Howard: K34OB-D
- Hysham: K13PO-D
- Meeteetse, WY: K17KC-D
- Miles City: K06FE-D
- Rosebud, etc.: K10QZ-D
- Roundup: K31PY-D
- White Sulphur Springs: K07NU-D

=== Former satellite ===
From May 1, 1998, to December 31, 2024, KULR-TV was additionally rebroadcast by KYUS-TV (channel 3) in Miles City, a full-time satellite separately owned by The Marks Group. KYUS-TV became a satellite of KULR-TV in 1998 under a time brokerage agreement. The original agreement expired after ten years, but KYUS-TV continued to broadcast KULR-TV under a series of informal agreements, receiving no payment and keeping no advertising income. Although the station generated no revenue of its own, Marks continued to operate it as a public service. This arrangement ended on December 31, 2024, at which point KYUS went silent.
