= KERR =

- Polson, Montana; United States
- Broadcast area: Kalispell, Montana
- Frequency: 750 kHz
- Branding: KERR Country

Programming
- Format: Country

Ownership
- Owner: Anderson Radio Broadcasting, Inc.
- Sister stations: KKMT, KIBG, KQRK, KQDE

Technical information
- Licensing authority: FCC
- Facility ID: 2208
- Class: B
- Power: 50,000 watts (day); 1,000 watts (night)
- Transmitter coordinates: 47°38′34″N 114°07′25″W
- Translator: 93.9 megahertz (K230BC)

Links
- Public license information: Public file; LMS
- Website: http://www.750kerr.com/

KERR (750 AM, "KERR Country") is a radio station licensed to serve Polson, Montana. The station is owned by Anderson Radio Broadcasting, Inc. It airs a country music format.

The station was assigned the KERR call letters by the Federal Communications Commission.

KERR is Montana's primary entry point station for the Emergency Alert System.
