= KVVR =

- Dutton, Montana; United States
- Broadcast area: Great Falls area
- Frequency: 97.9 MHz
- Branding: 97.9 the River

Programming
- Format: Adult contemporary
- Affiliations: Compass Media Networks; United Stations Radio Networks; Westwood One

Ownership
- Owner: Townsquare Media; (Townsquare License, LLC)
- Sister stations: KAAK, KLFM, KMON, KMON-FM

History
- First air date: 1998-09-08 (as KBJF)
- Former call signs: KBJF (9/1998-12/1998); KLHK (1998–2001)

Technical information
- Licensing authority: FCC
- Facility ID: 84237
- Class: C1
- ERP: 100,000 watts
- HAAT: 218 meters (715 ft)
- Transmitter coordinates: 47°36′52″N 111°20′51″W

Links
- Public license information: Public file; LMS
- Webcast: Listen Live
- Website: theriver979.com

KVVR (97.9 FM) is a radio station broadcasting in an adult contemporary format. Licensed to Dutton, Montana, United States, the station serves the Great Falls area. The station is currently owned by Townsquare Media and features programming from Compass Media Networks, United Stations Radio Networks, and Westwood One.

== History ==
The station went on the air as KBJF on September 8, 1998. On December 3, 1998, the station changed its call sign to KLHK. On May 3, 2001, the station changed its call sign to the current KVVR.
