= KMBR =

Radio station in Butte, Montana

- Butte, Montana; United States
- Broadcast area: Butte-Helena, Montana
- Frequency: 95.5 MHz
- Branding: 95.5 KMBR

Programming
- Format: Classic rock

Ownership
- Owner: Townsquare Media; (Townsquare License, LLC)
- Sister stations: KAAR, KMTZ, KXTL

History
- First air date: February 1, 1980
- Former call signs: KQUY (1979–1980); KQUY-FM (1980–1996)
- Call sign meaning: Montana's Best Rock (slogan)

Technical information
- Licensing authority: FCC
- Facility ID: 63875
- Class: C
- ERP: 50,000 watts
- HAAT: 555 meters
- Transmitter coordinates: 46.008°N 112.443°W

Links
- Public license information: Public file; LMS
- Webcast: Listen Live
- Website: 955kmbr.com

KMBR (95.5 FM, "95.5 KMBR") is a commercial radio station in Butte, Montana, broadcasting to the Butte, Montana area. KMBR airs a classic rock music format.

KMBR began broadcasting on February 1, 1980 as KQUY-FM. The call sign changed on December 13, 1996, when it switched over from its old call sign (KQUY) and branding (Y-95). Y-95 played a Hot AC format featuring artists like Mariah Carey, Madonna, Huey Lewis and Richard Marx. KMBR shifted the emphasis to "Montana's Best Rock", featuring core artists such as Led Zeppelin, Van Halen, AC/DC, Lynyrd Skynyrd and more. The original mainstays were Uncle Dave Levin in the mornings, the ArchMan with the "Power Lunch" from 10:00 a.m. to 3:00 p.m., and Robin Taylor (later Robin Jordan) with afternoons. Currently KMBR features "The Brian and Chris Show" in the Mornings, Middays with Carin Sullivan, The Rock Show with Tommy O during PM drive, Nights with Alice Cooper followed by jock-free rock in the overnights.

The station carries the syndicated programs Flashback and Breakfast with the Beatles.

KMBR and its sister stations are all located at 750 Dewey Blvd. in Butte. The rear of this radio facility houses the small studios of the local NBC affiliate, KTVM Channel 6. KAAR and KMBR share a transmitter site northeast of town, east of Interstate 15.

== Ownership ==
In June 2006, KMBR was acquired by Cherry Creek Radio from Fisher Radio Regional Group as part of a 24 station deal with a total reported sale price of $33.3 million.

Effective June 17, 2022, KMBR was acquired by Townsquare Media from Cherry Creek Radio as part of a 42 station/21 translator deal with a sale price of $18.75 million.
