= KZMN =

- Kalispell, Montana; United States
- Broadcast area: Flathead Valley
- Frequency: 103.9 MHz
- Branding: The Monster 103.9 & 106.7

Programming
- Format: Classic rock

Ownership
- Owner: KOFI, Inc.
- Sister stations: KOFI, KOLK

History
- First air date: 1988 (as KOFI-FM)
- Former call signs: KOFI-FM (1988–2003)

Technical information
- Licensing authority: FCC
- Facility ID: 35369
- Class: C1
- ERP: 100,000 watts (hor.); 43,000 watts (vert.)
- HAAT: 174 meters (571 feet)
- Transmitter coordinates: 48°05′39″N 114°16′11″W
- Translator: 106.7 K294CK (Whitefish)

Links
- Public license information: Public file; LMS
- Website: monster1039.com

KZMN (103.9 FM, "The Monster 103.9 & 106.7") is a radio station licensed to serve Kalispell, Montana. The station is owned by KOFI, Inc. It airs a Classic rock music format.

Their studios are downtown Kalispell at 317 1st Ave. E. with sister station KOFI. The transmitter and 570 foot tower are in Somers, on Buffalo Trail Road.

The station was assigned the KZMN call letters by the Federal Communications Commission on May 15, 2003.

Logo before 106.7 translator sign on
