= KRKX =

Radio station in Billings, Montana

Billings, Montana; United States
- Broadcast area: Billings Metropolitan Area
- Frequency: 94.1 MHz
- Branding: K✩SKY 94✩1

Programming
- Format: Country

Ownership
- Owner: Desert Mountain Broadcasting; (Desert Mountain Broadcasting Licenses, LLC)
- Sister stations: KBLG, KPLN, KRZN, KWMY, KYYA

History
- First air date: 1989

Technical information
- Licensing authority: FCC
- Facility ID: 63870
- Class: C1
- ERP: 100,000 watts
- HAAT: 180 meters (590 ft)
- Transmitter coordinates: 45°45′37″N 108°27′9″W

Links
- Public license information: Public file; LMS
- Webcast: Listen Live
- Website: www.941ksky.com

KRKX (94.1 FM) is a commercial radio station in Billings, Montana. KRKX airs a country music format.

== Ownership ==
In June 2006, KRKX was acquired by Cherry Creek Radio from Fisher Radio Regional Group as part of a 24 station deal with a total reported sale price of $33.3 million.

On January 1, 2010, KRKX changed their format to country, branded as "K-Sky".

On May 7, 2019, Connoisseur Media announced that it would sell its Billings cluster to Desert Mountain Broadcasting, an entity formed by Connoisseur Billings general manager Cam Maxwell. The sale closed on July 31, 2019.
