= KWMY =

Radio station in Joliet–Billings, Montana

- Joliet, Montana; United States
- Broadcast area: Billings Metropolitan Area
- Frequency: 105.9 MHz
- Branding: My 105.9

Programming
- Format: Classic hits

Ownership
- Owner: Desert Mountain Broadcasting; (Desert Mountain Broadcasting Licenses, LLC)
- Sister stations: KBLG, KPLN, KRKX, KRZN, KYYA

History
- First air date: 2006 (as KPBR)
- Former call signs: KPBR (2006–2009)

Technical information
- Licensing authority: FCC
- Facility ID: 164107
- Class: C1
- ERP: 100,000 watts
- HAAT: 134 meters (440 ft)
- Transmitter coordinates: 45°39′31″N 108°34′14″W

Links
- Public license information: Public file; LMS
- Webcast: Listen live
- Website: classichitsmy1059.com

KWMY is a commercial radio station in Joliet, Montana, broadcasting to the Billings, Montana area on 105.9 FM. Licensed to Joliet, Montana, United States, the station serves the Billings area. The station is owned by Desert Mountain Broadcasting.

KWMY airs a classic hits format branded as "My 105.9".

== History ==
From 2006 to 2009, KWMY was KPBR branded as "Rockin' Country 105.9 The Bar".

On May 7, 2019, Connoisseur Media announced that it would sell its Billings cluster to Desert Mountain Broadcasting, an entity formed by Connoisseur Billings general manager Cam Maxwell. The sale closed on July 31, 2019.
