= KOLK =

- Lakeside, Montana; United States
- Broadcast area: Kalispell, Montana
- Frequency: 94.3 MHz
- Branding: The Lake

Programming
- Format: Country music

Ownership
- Owner: KOFI, Inc.
- Sister stations: KOFI, KZMN

History
- Call sign meaning: "Lake"

Technical information
- Licensing authority: FCC
- Facility ID: 183365
- Class: C3
- ERP: 5,175 watts
- HAAT: 159.6 meters (524 ft)
- Transmitter coordinates: 48°11′44.5″N 114°18′37.5″W

Links
- Public license information: Public file; LMS
- Website: 943thelake.com

KOLK (94.3 FM) is a radio station licensed to Lakeside, Montana. The station broadcasts a country music format and is owned by KOFI, Inc.
