= KAAK =

- Great Falls, Montana; United States
- Broadcast area: Great Falls area
- Frequency: 98.9 MHz
- Branding: K 99

Programming
- Format: Contemporary hit radio
- Affiliations: Compass Media Networks; Premiere Networks; Westwood One

Ownership
- Owner: Townsquare Media; (Townsquare License, LLC)
- Sister stations: KLFM, KMON, KMON-FM, KVVR

History
- First air date: June 19, 1972
- Former call signs: KANR-FM (1972–1978)

Technical information
- Licensing authority: FCC
- Facility ID: 63872
- Class: C1
- ERP: 100,000 watts
- HAAT: 147.0 meters (482.3 ft)
- Transmitter coordinates: 47°32′23″N 111°17′06″W

Links
- Public license information: Public file; LMS
- Webcast: Listen live
- Website: k99hits.com

KAAK (98.9 FM) is a radio station broadcasting a contemporary hit radio format. Licensed to Great Falls, Montana, United States, the station serves the Great Falls area. The station is currently owned by Townsquare Media and licensed to Townsquare License, LLC.

== Ownership ==
In June 2006, a deal was reached for KAAK to be acquired by Cherry Creek Radio from Fisher Radio Regional Group as part of a 24 station deal with a total reported sale price of $33.3 million.

Effective June 17, 2022, KAAK was acquired by Townsquare Media from Cherry Creek Radio as part of a 42 station/21 translator deal with a sale price of $18.75 million.
