= KXTL =

Radio station in Butte, Montana

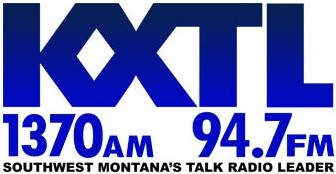
- Butte, Montana; United States
- Frequency: 1370 kHz
- Branding: KXTL 1370 AM 94.7 FM

Programming
- Format: Talk
- Affiliations: Fox News Radio; Premiere Networks; Westwood One

Ownership
- Owner: Townsquare Media; (Townsquare License, LLC)
- Sister stations: KAAR; KMBR; KMTZ

History
- First air date: January 31, 1929
- Former call signs: KGIR (1929–1946); KXLF (1946–1984); KCEZ (1984–1985)

Technical information
- Licensing authority: FCC
- Facility ID: 63871
- Class: B
- Power: 1,000 watts
- Transmitter coordinates: 46°0′20.73″N 112°37′57.1″W
- Translator: 94.7 K234AT (McQueen)

Links
- Public license information: Public file; LMS
- Webcast: Listen live
- Website: kxtl.com

KXTL (1370 kHz) is a radio station licensed to serve Butte, Montana. The station is owned by Townsquare Media and licensed to Townsquare License, LLC. It airs a talk radio format. The station is a primary affiliate for the Bobcat Sports Radio Network, airing live Montana State University athletic events. Its technical operations are located at 750 Dewey Blvd. The rear of this radio facility houses the small studios of the local NBC affiliate, KTVM Channel 6. The KXTL transmitter site is on Nissler Road, west of Butte.

== History ==
KXTL is one of the region's pioneering stations, signing on as KGIR on January 31, 1929. Founded by Ed Craney, the station was the cornerstone of the Z-Bar Network, which linked Montana stations using a cow brand as its logo. Ed Craney founded the network to give isolated Montana communities access to high-quality national content that individual local stations could not afford on their own. By linking the stations via telephone circuits, Craney was able to feed NBC national programming from the flagship station in Butte to the smaller markets across the state. The original studios were located on the fourth floor of Shiner's Furniture on Park Street after a planned location at the Finlen Hotel was blocked. In 1946, Craney transitioned the station to the KXLF call sign to match his other "XL" branded properties.

The station operated as KXLF until 1984, when it was sold separately from KXLF-TV and briefly adopted the call sign KCEZ. The Federal Communications Commission officially assigned the current KXTL call sign on August 1, 1985. In June 2006, KXTL was acquired by Cherry Creek Radio from Fisher Radio Regional Group as part of a 24 station deal with a total reported sale price of $33.3 million. Effective June 17, 2022, the station was acquired by Townsquare Media from Cherry Creek Broadcasting as part of an $18.75 million multi-market transaction.

== Translator ==
Call sign	Frequency	City of license	FID	ERP (W)	Class	Transmitter coordinates	FCC info
K234AT	94.7 FM	McQueen, Montana	145977	250	D	46°0′27.6″N 112°26′33.8″W	LMS
