= KMON-FM =

- Great Falls, Montana; United States
- Broadcast area: Great Falls area
- Frequency: 94.5 MHz (HD Radio)
- Branding: Max Country 94.5

Programming
- Format: Country
- Subchannels: HD2: 107.5 The Peak (Alternative rock); HD3: 99.9 Big Sky Sports (Sports); HD4: Big Stack 103.9 (Active rock)
- Affiliations: Compass Media Networks; Westwood One

Ownership
- Owner: Townsquare Media; (Townsquare License, LLC)
- Sister stations: KAAK, KLFM, KMON, KVVR

History
- First air date: November 30, 1979 (as KNUW-FM)
- Former call signs: KNUW-FM (1979–1984)
- Call sign meaning: K MONtana

Technical information
- Licensing authority: FCC
- Facility ID: 62331
- Class: C1
- ERP: 100,000 watts
- HAAT: 151 meters
- Transmitter coordinates: 47°32′19″N 111°15′41″W
- Translators: HD2: 107.5 K298BL (Great Falls); HD3: 99.9 K260AU (Great Falls); HD4: 103.9 K280GG (Great Falls)

Links
- Public license information: Public file; LMS
- Webcast: Listen Live; Listen Live (HD2); Listen Live (HD3); Listen Live (HD4)
- Website: 945maxcountry.com 1075thepeak.com (HD2); 999bigskysports.com (HD3) bigstack1039.com (HD4)

KMON-FM (94.5 MHz) is a radio station broadcasting a country music format. Licensed to Great Falls, Montana, United States, the station serves the Great Falls area. The station is currently owned by Townsquare Media and features programming from Compass Media Networks and Westwood One.

== History ==
The station went on the air as KNUW-FM on November 30, 1979. On November 2, 1984, the station changed its call sign to the current KMON.

== KMON-HD2 ==
On May 5, 2017, KMON-FM launched an adult alternative format on its HD2 subchannel, branded as "107.5 The Peak" (simulcast on translator K298BL 107.5 FM Great Falls).
