= KQDE =

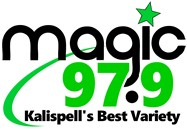
- Evergreen, Montana; United States
- Broadcast area: Kalispell, Montana and The Flathead
- Frequency: 1340 kHz
- Branding: Magic 97.9

Programming
- Format: Urban Contemporary

Ownership
- Owner: Anderson Radio Broadcasting, Inc.
- Sister stations: KERR, KIBG, KKMT, KQRK

History
- First air date: 2008 (as KQJZ)
- Former call signs: KQJZ (2006–2016); KLYW (7/2016-8/2016); KYWL (2016–2017)

Technical information
- Licensing authority: FCC
- Facility ID: 160700
- Class: C
- Power: 1,000 watts (day); 670 watts (night)
- Transmitter coordinates: 48°14′20″N 114°15′09″W
- Translator: 97.9 K250BP (Evergreen)

Links
- Public license information: Public file; LMS
- Website: kalispellsmagic.com

KQDE (1340 AM) is a radio station licensed to serve Evergreen, Montana, United States. The station is owned by Anderson Radio Broadcasting, Inc.

KQDE broadcasts an urban contemporary music format to Kalispell, Montana, and The Flathead.

== History ==
This station received its original construction permit from the Federal Communications Commission on January 26, 2006. The new station was assigned the call letters KQJZ by the FCC on April 26, 2006.

Logo used until October, 2012.

In November 2006, permit holder Advance Acquisition, Inc., reached an agreement to sell this still-under construction station to Anderson Radio Broadcasting, Inc., for a reported sale price of $200,000. The deal was approved by the FCC on January 12, 2007, and after a series of extensions the transaction was consummated on February 29, 2008. KQJZ received its license to cover from the FCC on December 4, 2008.

In October, 2012, KQJZ switched formats from Smooth Jazz to Adult Standards as "1340 The Lounge".

On July 1, 2016, KQJZ changed their format from adult standards to urban contemporary, branded as "Heat 97.9" (simulcast on FM translator K258BW 97.9 FM Evergreen).

On July 25, 2016, KQJZ changed their call letters to KLYW. The station changed its call sign again on August 12, 2016 to KYWL. On February 1, 2017, the station changed its call sign to KQDE.

== Translator ==
KQDE programming is also carried on a broadcast translator station to extend or improve the coverage area of the station. This translator previously carried another Anderson station, KIBG. The translator frequency is used in the branding of the station.

Call sign	Frequency	City of license	FID	ERP (W)	Class	FCC info
K250BP	97.9 FM	Evergreen, Montana	149287	205	D	LMS
