= KPLN =

Radio station in Lockwood, Montana

- Lockwood, Montana; United States
- Broadcast area: Billings metropolitan area
- Frequency: 106.7 MHz
- Branding: Planet 106.7

Programming
- Format: Hot adult contemporary
- Affiliations: Compass Media Networks

Ownership
- Owner: Desert Mountain Broadcasting; (Desert Mountain Broadcasting Licenses, LLC)
- Sister stations: KBLG, KWMY, KRKX, KRZN, KYYA

History
- First air date: 2006

Technical information
- Facility ID: 164108
- Class: C1
- ERP: 100,000 watts
- HAAT: 156 meters (512 ft)
- Transmitter coordinates: 45°45′54″N 108°27′19″W

Links
- Website: planet1067.com

KPLN (106.7 FM) is a commercial radio station in Lockwood, Montana, broadcasting to the Billings, Montana area.

KPLN airs a hot adult contemporary music format branded as “Planet 106.7”.

== History ==
On May 7, 2019 Connoisseur Media announced that it would sell its Billings cluster to Desert Mountain Broadcasting, an entity formed by Connoisseur Billings general manager Cam Maxwell. The sale closed on July 31, 2019.
