= KBCK (AM) =

Deer Lodge, Montana; United States
- Frequency: 1400 kHz
- Branding: The River

Programming
- Format: Classic country

Ownership
- Owner: Robert Cummings Toole
- Sister stations: KQRV

History
- First air date: 1964
- Last air date: August 2021
- Former call signs: KDRG (1964–2002)
- Call sign meaning: "Buck" (previous branding)

Technical information
- Facility ID: 670
- Class: C
- Power: 1,000 watts
- Transmitter coordinates: 46°24′52″N 112°43′16″W

KBCK (1400 AM, "The River") was a radio station licensed to serve Deer Lodge, Montana. The station was last owned by Robert Cummings Toole. It last aired a classic country music format.

== History ==
The station was assigned the KBCK call letters by the Federal Communications Commission (FCC) on June 20, 2002.

In November 2006, Butte Broadcasting reached an agreement with Jimmy Ray Carroll to acquire KBCK as part of a three-station deal worth a reported $500,000. Robert Cummings Toole immediately reached an agreement to acquire KBCK from Butte Broadcasting for a reported cash price of $100,000.

KBCK's license was surrendered to the FCC and cancelled on April 11, 2022, following Toole's death; it had been off the air due to storm damage since August 2021.
