= KHDN =

Radio station in Hardin, Montana

- Hardin, Montana; United States
- Broadcast area: Billings metropolitan area
- Frequency: 1230 kHz
- Branding: The Vigilante 1230 AM

Programming
- Format: News Talk Information
- Affiliations: Salem Radio Network; Townhall News

Ownership
- Owner: Chris Kortlander; (Montana Radio Broadcasting Company LLC)

History
- First air date: 1963
- Former call signs: KYTY (1984–1986); KBSR (1986–1989); KKUL (1989–1995)
- Call sign meaning: K HarDiN

Technical information
- Licensing authority: FCC
- Facility ID: 5298
- Class: C
- Power: 1,000 watts unlimited
- Transmitter coordinates: 45°42′55″N 107°35′59″W

Links
- Public license information: Public file; LMS
- Webcast: Listen Live
- Website: khdnradio.com

KHDN (1230 AM) is a radio station broadcasting a News Talk Information format. Licensed to Hardin, Montana, United States, the station serves the Billings metropolitan area. The station is currently owned by Chris Kortlander, through licensee Montana Radio Broadcasting Company LLC, and features programming from Salem Radio Network and Townhall News.

== History ==
KHDN signed on the air on June 13, 1963, as KHDN. It was owned by Hardin Broadcasting Company. The station operated under what are known as "specified hours", which means the station did not broadcast around the clock. The original license stated that the hours of operation were 6 AM through 6 PM local time Monday through Saturday, and 8 am through 6 pm on Sundays. This change was granted in September 1967. The station faced a fine of $200 by the Federal Communications Commission in 1968. The station was sold to Empire Broadcasting Corporation in 1968. The station was fined for $700 again in 1970, and $25 in 1971. It was sold to Big Horn Broadcasting in 1972. The station at the time signed off the air at 7 pm local time.

The call sign changed to KYTY on August 10, 1984. On September 10, 1986, the station changed its call sign to KBSR, on March 28, 1989, to KKUL, and on June 1, 1995, to the current KHDN. The station was owned by Big Sky Radio. In the late 2010s, then-owner Big Sky Radio's sister stations were KBSR in Laurel, Montana, and KYLW in Lockwood, Montana. Both of the sister stations had their licenses revoked by the FCC due to their transmitters not existing where they were licensed.

In the early 1980s, the station carried a Country music format.

The station was sold to Montana Radio Broadcasting Company from Sun Mountain Inc. in August 2021. The station was sold with no consideration. The current owners updated the station's format to include programming from Salem Radio Network.
