= KYYA =

Radio station in Billings, Montana

- Billings, Montana; United States
- Broadcast area: Billings Metropolitan Area
- Frequency: 730 kHz (HD Radio)
- Branding: 98.1 K-Bear

Programming
- Format: Oldies
- Affiliations: ABC News Radio

Ownership
- Owner: Desert Mountain Broadcasting; (Desert Mountain Broadcasting Licenses, LLC)
- Sister stations: KBLG, KPLN, KRZN, KWMY, KRKX

History
- First air date: October 15, 1959 (as KURL)
- Former call signs: KURL (1959–2010)

Technical information
- Licensing authority: FCC
- Facility ID: 19216
- Class: D
- Power: 5,000 watts day 236 watts night
- Transmitter coordinates: 45°45′29″N 108°29′53″W
- Translator: 98.1 K251CI (Billings)

Links
- Public license information: Public file; LMS
- Webcast: Listen live
- Website: 981kbear.com

KYYA (730 AM) is a radio station licensed to Billings, Montana, United States. The station serves the Billings area. The station is currently owned by Desert Mountain Broadcasting. These call letters previously belonged to 93.3 FM which formerly aired a Top 40/CHR format for many years. The 93.3 FM station last aired an Adult AC format until it went silent and was later sold to another radio broadcaster in the Billings radio market. 730 AM is a Canadian and Mexican clear-channel frequency.

== History ==
KYYA signed on as KURL on October 15, 1959. At the time, the transmitting power was only 500 watts. The transmitter was located north of Garden Avenue between Sugar and Riverside Road in Billings. The station was owned by Yellowstone Broadcasting Corporation. In early 1962, the station was assigned to Christian Enterprises Incorporation, and the station began a long history carrying a religious format. KURL applied to increase power to 5,000 watts on February 10, 1981.

The station was one of several purchased by Harold Erickson in the 1960s to "cover the entire state of Montana with Christian radio". The network included KGLE in Glendive, KGVW in Belgrade (since deleted), as well as others in surrounding states. KURL-FM was brought on the air in 1972, then on 97.1, initially airing elevator music. That station was sold in 1981 and became known as K-Bear. KURL aired national programming in the 1970s. Programs such as Focus on the Family, and Insight for Living, were added to the lineup. In 2010, Connoisseur Media purchased the station, taking the religious programming over to KURL-FM where it continues today. KURL-AM began broadcasting a news/talk format. In 2013, the station celebrated its 50th year of broadcasting.

On May 7, 2019, Connoisseur Media announced that it would sell its Billings cluster to Desert Mountain Broadcasting, an entity formed by Connoisseur Billings general manager Cam Maxwell. The sale closed on July 31, 2019.

On November 27, 2019, KYYA dropped its news/talk format and began stunting with Christmas music as "Billings' Christmas Station" (simulcasting on FM translator K251CI 98.1 FM Billings).

On December 26, 2019, KYYA ended its Christmas music stunt and launched an oldies format, branded as "98.1 K-Bear".
