= KYSX =

Radio station in Billings, Montana

Billings, Montana; United States
- Broadcast area: Billings Metropolitan Area
- Frequency: 105.1 MHz
- Branding: 105.1 The Bone

Programming
- Format: Mainstream rock

Ownership
- Owner: Radio Billings, LLC
- Sister stations: KRSQ, KEWF

History
- First air date: 1998 (as KBEX)
- Former call signs: KBEX (1998–2003); KNDZ (2003–2005); KQBL (2005–2011)

Technical information
- Licensing authority: FCC
- Facility ID: 76918
- Class: A
- ERP: 6,000 watts
- HAAT: 100 meters (330 ft)
- Transmitter coordinates: 45°45′54″N 108°27′20″W

Links
- Public license information: Public file; LMS

KYSX is a commercial radio station licensed to Billings, Montana, United States, broadcasting on 105.1 FM. It was owned by BMG Billings, LLC, but is now owned by Radio Billings, LLC.

== History ==
Prior to December 2, 2008, it was an adult hits station known as "Bill FM". It was launched on May 15, 1998 as adult album alternative Classic Hits 105-1 KBEX. It later changed to the rock format, first as 105-1 The Blitz, then as 105.1 The End in 2003 under the new call letters KNDZ. It switched to KQBL "105-1 Bill FM" on August 26, 2005, and later became Billings' Sports Station "ESPN 105.1". On March 4, 2011 KQBL changed its call letters to KYSX. On March 21, 2011, the station changed its format from ESPN Radio to classic rock, branded as "105 The X". The station was labeled as 105 the X, and features no local DJs, just classic rock music all day long. The station's name was modeled after KRKX-FM's old nickname "The X" when KRKX-FM was Billings's Classic rock station prior to its current country format.

On December 17, 2012, KYSX changed its format to classic country, branded as "Twang 105.1" operated by Anthony Media (who also operates MOJO 92-5), with a focus of country music from the 1970s, 1980s and 1990s. Live Morning Show includes market veterans Jeff Howell and Matt Brubaker. On June 25, 2014, Twang 105 began simulcasting on 107.5 FM thus ending the four-year run featuring Adult Contemporary music as "Magic 107.5". On July 3, 2014, Twang 105 completed the move to FM 107.5 with 100,000 watts, and the New K-Rock 105 debuted at FM 105.1. Both stations are operated by Anthony Media. In February 2015, it was announced that the Michael and Kaitlyn Show would make the move to the new K Rock.

On November 12, 2015, KYSX changed its format from rock to Christmas music branded as "Santa 105.1" "The Christmas Station" with this change the "Michael and Kaitlyn Show" ended its short run.

On December 31, 2015, KYSX changed formats from Christmas music to Contemporary Christian music branded as "Crossroads 105.1", "Billings Christian Music Station" using the broadcast services of the Salem Music Network.

On January 1, 2018, KYSX changed operator and format from Contemporary Christian music to adult contemporary and was rebranded as "Classy 105.1" Operated by Radio Billings, LLC Featuring The Ashley and Brad show in the morning, John Tesh, and more.

On May 28, 2018, KYSX was rebranded as "105.1 Star FM" and still playing adult contemporary and light rock music.

On January 16, 2019, KYSX returned to the mainstream rock format from adult contemporary branded as "105.1 The Bone". The station went back to the same format it had in 2015 before flipping three times. The Bone enters a crowded rock field as The Bone intends to compete with active rock 96.3 the Zone as well as 103.7 the Hawk as My 105.9 and flanking 99.3 The Mountain. The flip took place in the middle of John Tesh with the first song being Seether "The Remedy".

== Previous logo ==
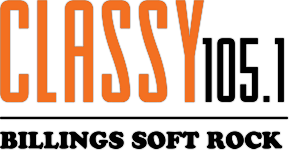
