= KRZN =

Radio station in Billings, Montana

Billings, Montana; United States
- Broadcast area: Billings Metropolitan Area
- Frequency: 96.3 MHz
- Branding: The Zone 96.3

Programming
- Format: Active rock

Ownership
- Owner: Desert Mountain Broadcasting; (Desert Mountain Broadcasting Licenses, LLC)
- Sister stations: KBLG, KPLN, KRKX, KWMY, KYYA

History
- First air date: 1998

Technical information
- Facility ID: 78476
- Class: C1
- ERP: 100,000 watts
- HAAT: 212 meters (696 ft)
- Transmitter coordinates: 45°45′37″N 108°27′9″W

Links
- Webcast: Listen live
- Website: www.963thezone.com

KRZN (96.3 FM, "The Zone") is a commercial radio station in Billings, Montana. KRZN airs an active rock music format. The station airs what it calls "6-packs" of rock which are commercial-free six-song blocks.

"The Zone" became Billings' first modern rock or alternative radio station. The format of music it plays has sometimes been referred to as new rock as well. Its playlist tends to be a mix of alternative acts, active rock, as well as 1980s classic rock. It began broadcasting as "The Zone" in June 2000. It had formerly played a country music format.

== Ownership ==
In June 2006, KRZN was acquired by Cherry Creek Radio from Fisher Radio Regional Group as part of a 24-station deal with a total reported sale price of $33.3 million. It was later acquired by Connoisseur Media.

On May 7, 2019 Connoisseur Media announced that it would sell its Billings cluster to Desert Mountain Broadcasting, an entity formed by Connoisseur Billings general manager Cam Maxwell. The sale closed on July 31, 2019.
