= KFHW-LP =

Radio station in Billings, Montana

- Billings, Montana; United States
- Broadcast area: Billings, Montana
- Frequency: 101.1 MHz

Programming
- Language: English

Ownership
- Owner: Best of Billings Schools Association

History
- First air date: 2001

Technical information
- Licensing authority: FCC
- Facility ID: 134746
- Class: L1
- ERP: 100 watts
- HAAT: -32.3 meters
- Transmitter coordinates: 45°46′16″N 108°29′7″W

Links
- Public license information: LMS

KFHW-LP is a radio station at 101.1 FM in Billings, Montana. It was originally licensed in 2001 by Best of Billings Schools Association. In March 2022, control of the station was transferred to Tana McNiven and Jonathan McNiven, and changed the station's main brand/market name to "YCN Radio."

== Programming ==
KFHW-LP provides a variety of educational and community-based programming, including local high school sports broadcasts, a weekly news broadcast, and occasionally a feature program.

It is considered "an extension of the Yellowstone County News."

=== Program Directors ===
The Program Director "oversees the conception and selection of all the station's content, and in the process shapes the station's demographic, identity, and core values."

==== Michael Marino (2022–present) ====
Michael Marino currently serves as the program director for YCN Radio/KFHW-LP. He assumed this role in September 2022.
