= KRPM =

Radio station in Billings, Montana

Billings, Montana; United States
- Broadcast area: Billings Metropolitan Area
- Frequency: 107.5 MHz
- Branding: Twang 107.5

Programming
- Format: Country

Ownership
- Owner: Radio Billings, LLC
- Sister stations: KBXI-FM

History
- First air date: May 22, 2000 (as KULU)
- Former call signs: KULU (5/2000-10/2000); KZRV (2000–2006)
- Call sign meaning: K-Revolutions Per Minute (for common measure of phonograph record speed)

Technical information
- Licensing authority: FCC
- Facility ID: 78211
- Class: C1
- ERP: 100,000 watts
- HAAT: 136 meters (446 ft)
- Transmitter coordinates: 45°45′48″N 108°27′20″W

Links
- Public license information: Public file; LMS
- Website: twang1075.com

KRPM (107.5 FM) is a radio station broadcasting a country music format. Licensed to Billings, Montana, United States, the station serves the Billings area. The station is currently owned by Radio Billings, LLC.

== History ==
KRPM signed on as KULU on May 22, 2000. On October 20, 2000, KULU flipped to 1980s hits as 107.5 The River under the new callsign KZRV. The format later became Adult Contemporary, still as 107.5 The River. 107.5 changed call letters to the current KRPM on November 10, 2006 and changed formats to Rock as Rock 107.5, which it carried until March 2010, when it flipped back to AC as Magic 107.5. On June 25, 2014, 107.5 switched to a simulcast of KYSX as "Twang 105" and on July 3, 2014 "Twang 105" officially switched to "Twang 107.5" and K-Rock 105 debut on 105.1 FM, In 2015 K-Rock switch to Contemporary Christian Music as Cross Roads 105.1, and as of January 1, 2018 switched to Adult Contemporary Music as Classy 105. On May 28, 2018 Classy 105 was rebranded as 105.1 Star FM (operated by Radio Billings, LLC). Twang 107.5 & MOJO 92-5 are operated by Anthony Media.
