= KURL =

Radio station in Billings, Montana

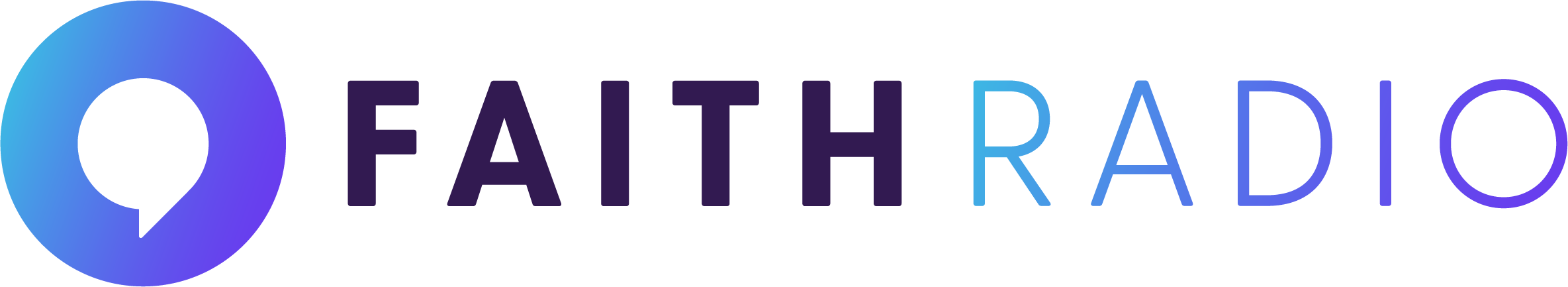
- Billings, Montana; United States
- Broadcast area: Billings Metropolitan Area
- Frequency: 93.3 MHz
- Branding: Faith Radio

Programming
- Format: Christian talk and teaching

Ownership
- Owner: Northwestern Media

History
- First air date: April 5, 1969
- Former call signs: KOYN, KYYA

Technical information
- Facility ID: 63880
- Class: C1
- ERP: 60,000 watts
- HAAT: 213 meters (699 ft)
- Transmitter coordinates: 45°45′37″N 108°27′9″W

Links
- Website: myfaithradio.com

KURL (93.3 FM) is a Christian radio station licensed to Billings, Montana, United States. The station is owned by Northwestern Media.

== History ==
The station first signed on, on April 5, 1969 as KOYN-FM with a country music format. The station was initially owned by Meyer Broadcasting. The station's transmitter was located southwest of Billings on Sacrifice Cliff. Its studios were located at 1645 Central Avenue. The call letters were changed to KYYA in 1975. The station increased its transmitting power to 99 kW on September 27, 1978. It planned to shift frequency to 93.9 MHz with the upgrade, but that change did not occur and KOYN stayed on 93.3.

Throughout most of the station's life since the 1970s, it was known as Y-93 FM and was the dominant Top 40/CHR station for the Billings metro area, over three decades. As the 1990s proceeded, Y-93 tweaked its CHR format towards Adult Top 40, but by 2000, the station became a full-blown Hot AC. By the end of the early 2000s, Y-93 faced stiff competition from KMHK adjusting to Hot AC and the newly launched KPLN in Lockwood. The competition forced Y-93 to change formats. In the last years, Y-93 ran a soft adult contemporary format. The station was owned by Fisher Radio Regional Group.

== Ownership ==
In June 2006, KYYA-FM was acquired by Cherry Creek Radio from Fisher Radio Regional Group as part of a 24 station deal with a total reported sale price of $33.3 million. Recently local Cherry Creek radio stations (KBLG-AM, KRZN-FM, KRKX-FM) were purchased by Connoisseur Media LLC. KWMY-FM MY-92-5 was moved to the 105.9 frequency replacing 105.9 The Bar and the longtime former Top-40 station KYYA-FM Y-93.3 (or Y93) went silent for a short period of time. The KURL calls, then on 730 AM, moved to 93.3.

In January 2024, the station was sold to Northwestern Media, a service of the University of Northwestern – St. Paul in Minnesota. This move expanded the programming carried on its network to Montana.
