= KEWF =

Radio station in Billings, Montana

Billings, Montana; United States
- Broadcast area: Billings Metropolitan Area
- Frequency: 98.5 MHz
- Branding: 98.5 The Wolf

Programming
- Format: Country

Ownership
- Owner: Radio Billings, LLC
- Sister stations: KYSX, KRSQ

History
- First air date: 1976
- Former call signs: KBMS (1976–1978); KIDX (1978–1998, 1998–1999); KOOK-FM (March–April 1998); KGHL-FM (1999–2011)

Technical information
- Facility ID: 50356
- Class: C1
- ERP: 100,000 watts
- HAAT: 113 meters (371 ft)
- Transmitter coordinates: 45°45′51″N 108°27′18″W

Links
- Webcast: Listen Live
- Website: 985thewolf.com

KEWF is a commercial radio station in Billings, Montana, broadcasting on 98.5 FM. KEWF airs a country music format branded as “98.5 The Wolf”. The station formerly went by the call letters KGHL- FM before former sister station KGHL- AM 790 was sold to new owner Northern Broadcasting System. Licensed to Billings, Montana, United States, the station serves the Billings area. The station is currently owned by Radio Billings, LLC.

== History ==
The station first signed on under the KBMS call letters in 1976 but changed its call letters to KIDX in August 1978. The station first aired an adult contemporary format and remained as an AC station for over 15 years. During its early years, it was originally affiliated with NBC's The Source network until 1987. KIDX dropped its longtime adult contemporary format in 1994 for its current country format. The station adopted the old KOOK-FM call letters for a short time in early 1998 but returned back to its KIDX call letters a short time later. It became KGHL-FM in 1999 and its current KWEF call letters in 2011.

== Programming ==
CMT Radio Live with Cody Alan (nationally syndicated)
