= KRSQ =

Radio station in Laurel–Billings, Montana

- Laurel, Montana; United States
- Broadcast area: Billings metropolitan area
- Frequency: 101.9 MHz
- Branding: Hot 101-9

Programming
- Language: English
- Format: Contemporary hit radio
- Affiliations: Compass Media Networks; United Stations Radio Networks

Ownership
- Owner: Radio Billings, LLC
- Sister stations: KYSX; KEWF

History
- First air date: June 1994
- Call sign meaning: Rescue

Technical information
- Licensing authority: FCC
- Facility ID: 4992
- Class: C1
- ERP: 100,000 watts
- HAAT: 112 meters (367 ft)
- Transmitter coordinates: 45°45′48″N 108°27′20″W

Links
- Public license information: Public file; LMS
- Webcast: Listen live
- Website: hot1019.com

KRSQ (101.9 FM, "Hot 101-9") is a commercial radio station licensed to Laurel, Montana, United States, and serving the Billings metropolitan area. Owned by Radio Billings, LLC, the station airs a contemporary hit radio format.
