= KMON (AM) =

- Great Falls, Montana; United States
- Broadcast area: Great Falls, Montana area
- Frequency: 560 kHz
- Branding: K'MON Country Radio 560 AM

Programming
- Format: Classic country
- Affiliations: ABC News Radio; United Stations Radio Networks

Ownership
- Owner: Townsquare Media; (Townsquare License, LLC)
- Sister stations: KAAK, KLFM, KMON-FM, KVVR

History
- First air date: 1948
- Call sign meaning: K MONtana

Technical information
- Licensing authority: FCC
- Facility ID: 62330
- Class: B
- Power: 5,000 watts
- Transmitter coordinates: 47°25′28.8″N 111°17′22.9″W

Links
- Public license information: Public file; LMS
- Webcast: Listen Live
- Website: 560kmon.com

KMON (560 kHz) is an AM radio station broadcasting a classic country format. Licensed to Great Falls, Montana, United States, the station serves the Great Falls area. The station is currently owned by Townsquare Media and features programming from ABC News Radio and United Stations Radio Networks.

== History ==
While the official broadcast license was granted in September 1948, the station actually began broadcasting in May of that year from its original headquarters in the Great Falls Tribune building. In 1960, the station negotiated a unique lease agreement to move its studios into the Holiday Village Mall. This arrangement was notable because it required no cash rent; instead, the station provided the mall with 30-second commercial spots every hour, 24 hours a day. Following several decades in the Rainbow Hotel, the station eventually moved to its current location at 914 13th Avenue South in 2016. Prior to 1948, the then-unbuilt station had the call sign KMFR and was licensed to Sun River Broadcasting Company. After the station was licensed to Montana Farmer Broadcasting Corporation, that company requested a change in call sign to KMON. The request was approved by the Federal Communications Commission in February 1948. The station's most iconic long-term home was on the second floor of the Rainbow Hotel, a historic building constructed in 1911 that once served as the social headquarters for Montana's elite.

Al Donohue was the manager when the station hired morning host Dave Wilson in 1969. Another influential figure was Jim Senst, who joined KMON in 1988 and later became a shareholder in STARadio, helping the station navigate several decades of industry consolidation. Currently, the station is overseen by Market President Ron Korb under the ownership of Townsquare Media.

For many years, the station utilized a massive RCA transmitter that was large enough for engineers to physically walk inside to perform maintenance. In early 2023, the station's primary transmitter—which had been in service for roughly 25 years—experienced a catastrophic hardware failure that included scorched circuit boards and cracked capacitors. Following a five-month period of operating at reduced power, a modern solid-state transmitter was installed and went live in July 2023.
