= Lockwood, Montana =

- CDP
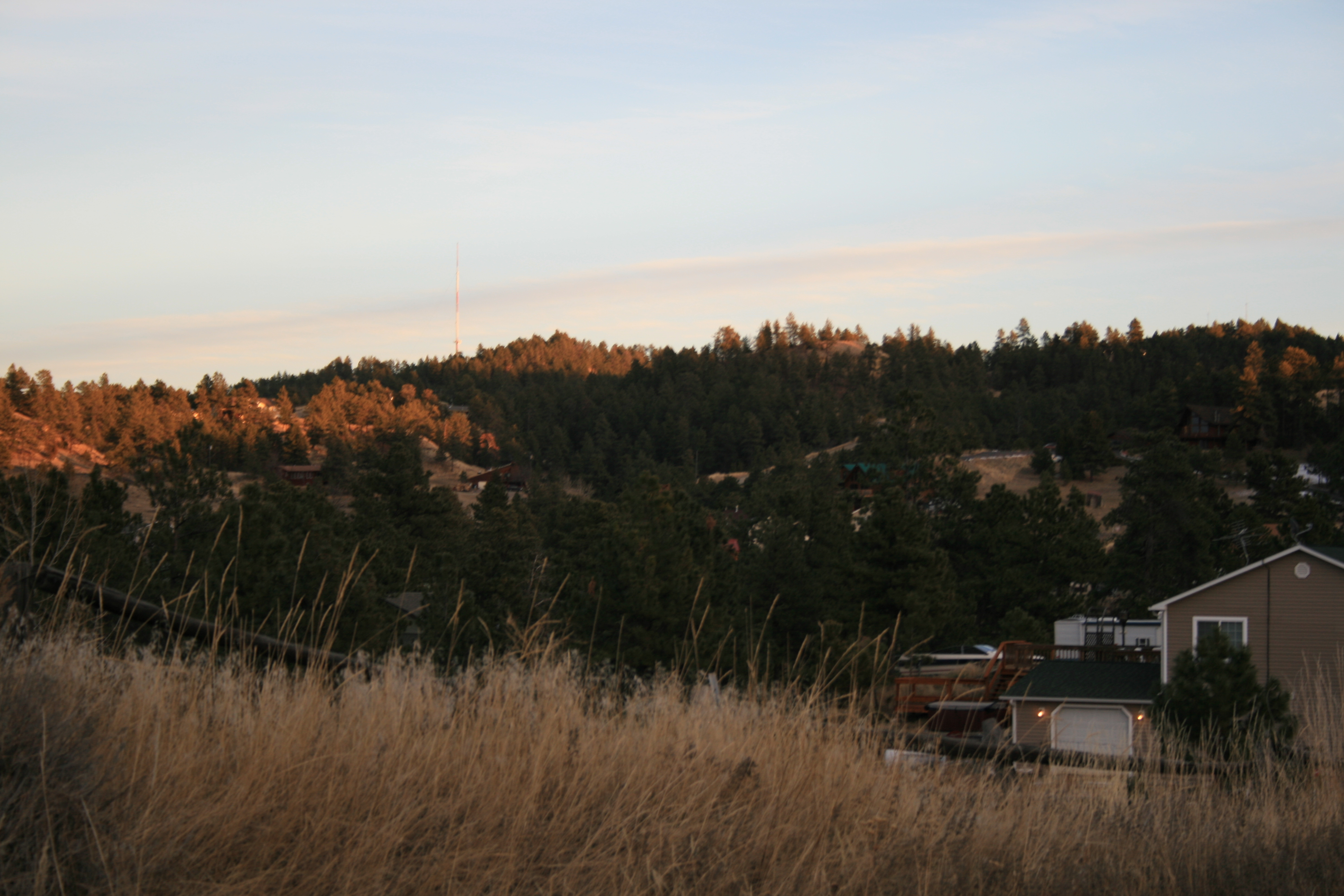
- Emerald Hills, Lockwood

- Location of Lockwood, Montana, just east of Billings
- Coordinates: 45°49′46″N 108°22′50″W
- Country: United States
- State: Montana
- County: Yellowstone

Area
  - Total: 13.342 sq mi (34.556 km^{2})
  - Land: 12.855 sq mi (33.294 km^{2})
  - Water: 0.487 sq mi (1.262 km^{2})
- Elevation: 3,127 ft (953 m)

Population (2020)
  - Total: 7,195
  - Estimate (2024): 7,393
  - Density: 560/sq mi (216.1/km^{2})
- Time zone: UTC–7 (Mountain (MST))
  - Summer (DST): UTC–6 (MDT)
- ZIP Code: 59101
- Area code: 406
- FIPS code: 30-44200
- GNIS feature ID: 2408626
- Website: lockwoodmontana.com

Lockwood is a census-designated place (CDP) in Yellowstone County, Montana, United States. It is not an organized city or town. The population was 7,195 at the 2020 census. Lockwood is a suburb of Billings and is the second largest community in the Billings Metropolitan Statistical Area. Annexation of Lockwood to Billings has been studied; however, the June 2009 Billings City Council Annexation Plan states that the city has no plans to annex Lockwood in the foreseeable future.

== Geography ==
According to the United States Census Bureau, the CDP has a total area of 12.855 square miles (33.29 km^{2}), is land and 0.487 square miles (1.26 km^{2}), is water.

== History ==
Lockwood bordered the Crow Indian Reservation, which was created in the 1800s. The community was named after Captain Lockwood, reputed to have many victories fighting Native Americans and to have been a surveyor for the government who camped in the foothills in the late 1800s. In 1907, settlers opened a public road through Lockwood Flats of heavy loam to the second crossing of Dry Creek, to the Dry Creek Road traversing to the Reservation. The old Native American supply road is still etched into the side of the hill at the south end of Exxon Road which was later called Peter Hoe Road.

Lockwood Flats was home of the Johnson Ranch. Just to the southeast of the ranch, one can find reminisces of Cavalry camps as they stay in the area for a whole winter surveying the land for the federal government. The area known as Lockwood Flats was also originally the site of a stop called Hirsch, between Johnson Lane and old Coulson Road. A community began to develop around it and the name Lockwood stuck, while the name Hirsch was eventually forgotten. On June 16, 1965, an F3 tornado touched down near Lockwood. It was the strongest tornado ever recorded in Yellowstone County.

Lockwood later grew to become the largest unincorporated community in the state of Montana and the 16th largest population center in the state. Lockwood is also one of the fastest-growing communities in Montana, with an estimated 58% increase between the 2000 and 2010 censuses. In 2010, Lockwood became a census-designated place.

== Demographics ==
Historical population
Census	Pop.	Note	%±
1990	3,967		—
2000	4,306		8.5%
2010	6,797		57.8%
2020	7,195		5.9%
2022 (est.)	7,393	▲	2.8%
U.S. Decennial Census; 2020 Census

=== 2020 census ===
As of the 2020 census, Lockwood had a population of 7,195. The median age was 37.1 years. 26.8% of residents were under the age of 18 and 13.9% of residents were 65 years of age or older. For every 100 females there were 101.5 males, and for every 100 females age 18 and over there were 102.0 males age 18 and over.

88.3% of residents lived in urban areas, while 11.7% lived in rural areas.

There were 2,697 households and 1,862 families residing in Lockwood, of which 33.2% had children under the age of 18 living in them. Of all households, 50.1% were married-couple households, 21.3% were households with a male householder and no spouse or partner present, and 20.3% were households with a female householder and no spouse or partner present. About 24.0% of all households were made up of individuals and 8.4% had someone living alone who was 65 years of age or older.

There were 2,811 housing units, of which 4.1% were vacant. The homeowner vacancy rate was 1.1% and the rental vacancy rate was 5.7%.

Racial composition as of the 2020 census
Race	Number	Percent
White	6,033	83.8%
Black or African American	33	0.5%
American Indian and Alaska Native	408	5.7%
Asian	27	0.4%
Native Hawaiian and Other Pacific Islander	4	0.1%
Some other race	130	1.8%
Two or more races	560	7.8%
Hispanic or Latino (of any race)	468	6.5%

=== 2010 census ===
As of the 2010 census, there were 6,797 people, 2,651 households, and 2,566 families residing in the CDP. The population density was 577.5 inhabitants per square mile (223.0/km^{2}). There were 2,651 housing units at an average density of 224.8 per square mile (86.8/km^{2}). The racial makeup of the CDP was 86.0% White, 0.4% African American, 4.5% Native American, 0.35% Asian, 0.12% Pacific Islander, 1.02% from other races, and 2.32% from two or more races. Hispanic or Latino of any race were 3.74% of the population.

There were 1,599 households, out of which 40.3% had children under the age of 18 living with them, 55.7% were married couples living together, 12.6% had a female householder with no husband present, and 26.3% were non-families. 20.8% of all households were made up of individuals, and 5.6% had someone living alone who was 65 years of age or older. The average household size was 2.69 and the average family size was 3.10.

In the CDP, the population was spread out, with 29.9% under the age of 18, 8.3% from 18 to 24, 31.7% from 25 to 44, 22.5% from 45 to 64, and 7.5% who were 65 years of age or older. The median age was 34 years. For every 100 females, there were 101.5 males. For every 100 females age 18 and over, there were 97.4 males.

=== Income and poverty ===
Lockwood's census data shows that the Lockwood CDP has a population of 8,477 and a 2011 Median Household Income (MHI) of $47,059 compared to the State of Montana's MHI of $43,872. With this MHI it may make it more difficult to secure grants specific to low income residents.

== Education ==
The school district for the vast majority of Lockwood is Lockwood K-12 Schools, a K-12 unified school district. A small portion of the territory is in Huntley Project K-12 Schools.

Lockwood Schools provides education from kindergarten through high school. Lockwood High School's team name is the Lions.
