= Billings metropolitan area =

- Metropolitan statistical area
- Billings, MT Metropolitan Statistical Area
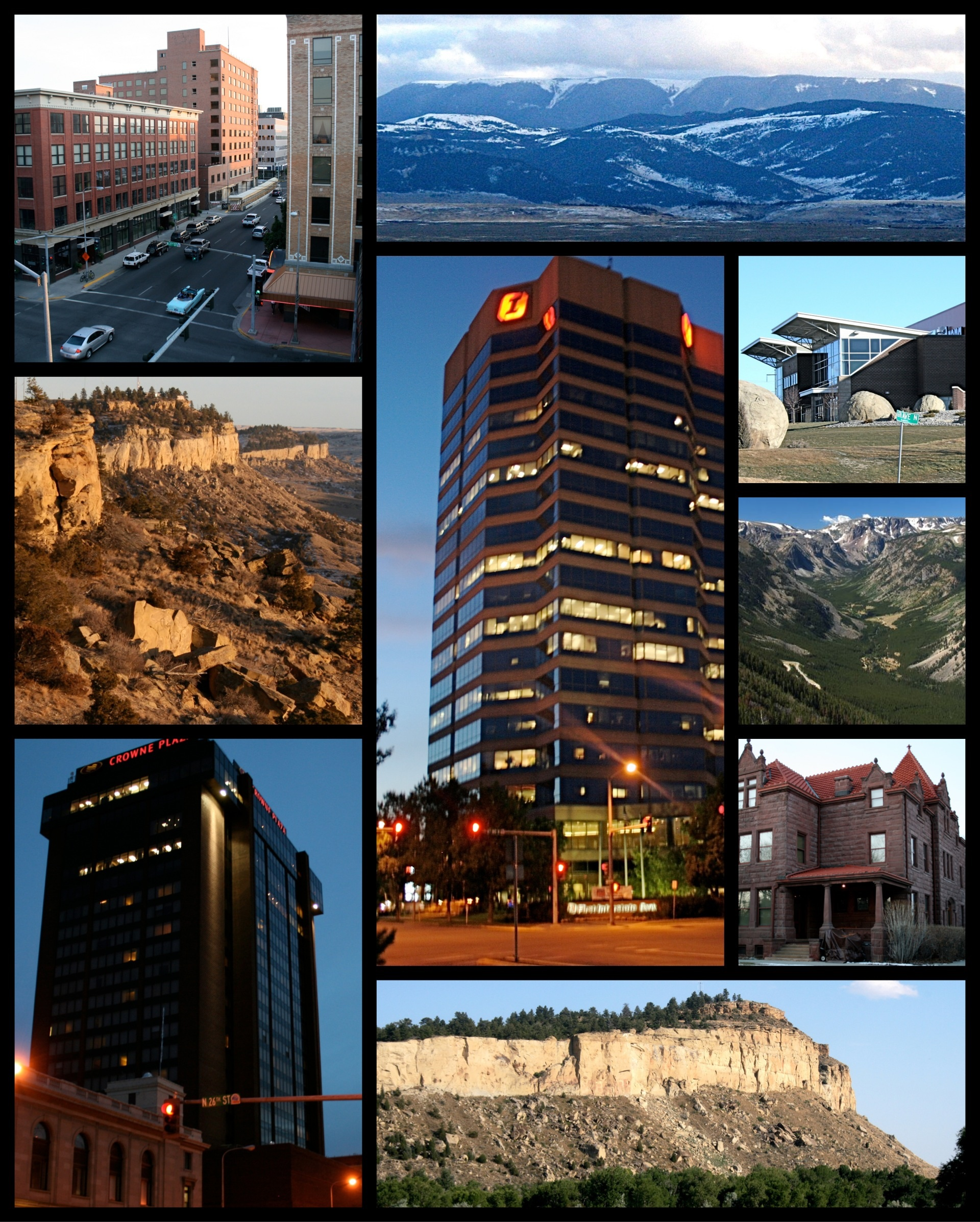
- Billings and surrounding area
Interactive Map of Billings, MT MSA
City of Billings
Billings, MT MSA
- Coordinates: 45°47′01″N 108°30′22″W
- Country: United States
- State: Montana
- Principal city: Billings
- Time zone: UTC-7 (MST)
  - Summer (DST): UTC-6 (MDT)

The Billings metropolitan area is the largest metropolitan area in the U.S. state of Montana. It is centered around Billings in the south central portion of Montana and has a population is 184,167 as of 2020.

It includes Carbon, Stillwater and Yellowstone counties, and has one of the geographically largest trade, cultural, business and medical areas in the United States; this includes all of Montana.

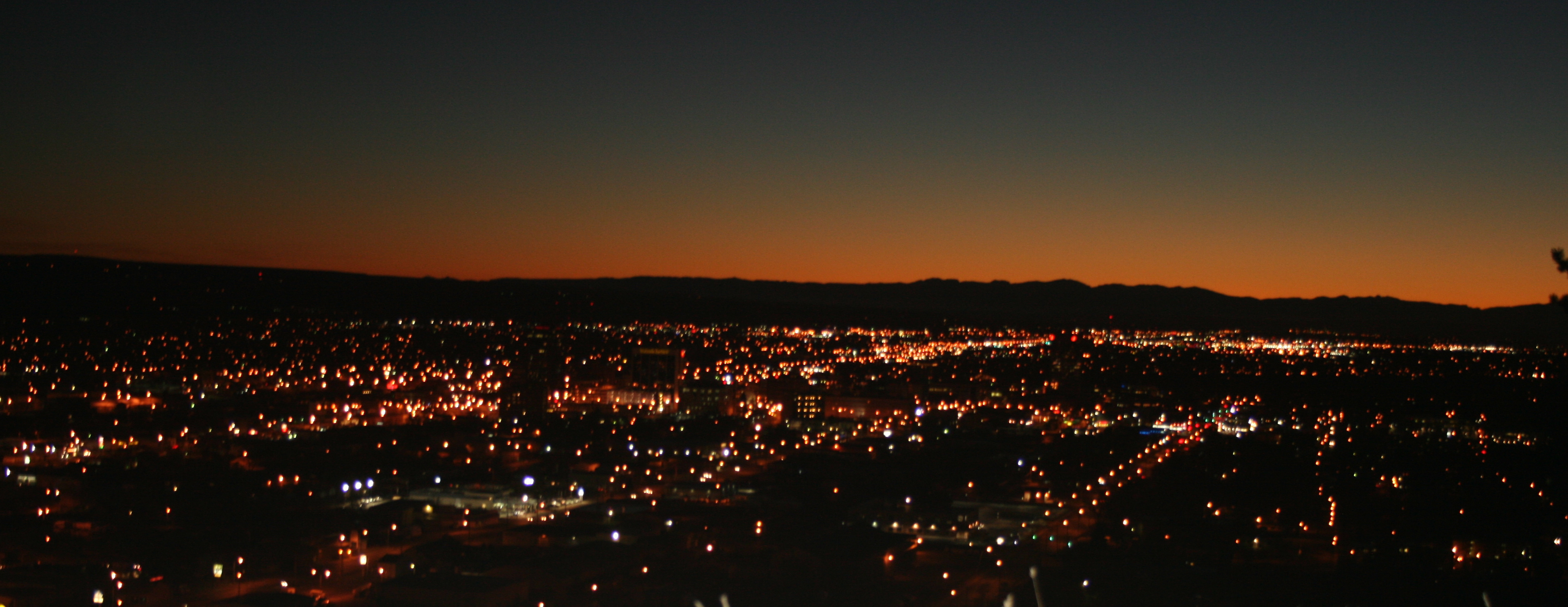
Billings midtown

== Counties ==
- Carbon
- Stillwater
- Yellowstone

== Places ==
=== Over 100,000 inhabitants ===
- Billings (Principal city)

=== 1,000 to 10,000 inhabitants ===
- Absarokee
- Columbus
- Laurel
- Lockwood (census-designated place)
- Park City (census-designated place)
- Red Lodge

=== 500 to 1,000 inhabitants ===
- Bridger
- Joliet
- Worden (census-designated place)

=== Below 500 inhabitants ===
- Ballantine (census-designated place)
- Belfry (census-designated place)
- Broadview
- Fromberg
- Huntley (census-designated place)
- Shepherd (census-designated place)

== Demographics ==
As of the census of 2000, there are 138,904 people, 56,149 households, and 36,926 families residing within the MSA. The racial makeup of the MSA was 93.08% White, 0.43% African American, 2.89% Native American, 0.53% Asian, 0.04% Pacific Islander, 1.22% from other races, and 1.81% from two or more races. Hispanic or Latino of any race were 3.57% of the population.

The median income for a household in the MSA was $34,433, and the median income for a family was $41,841. Males had a median income of $31,851 versus $20,756 for females. The per capita income for the MSA was $18,254.

== See also ==
- Montana census statistical areas
