= Polson, Montana =

Town in Montana, United States

Polson, Montana nčmqnétkʷ kwataqnuk
- Town
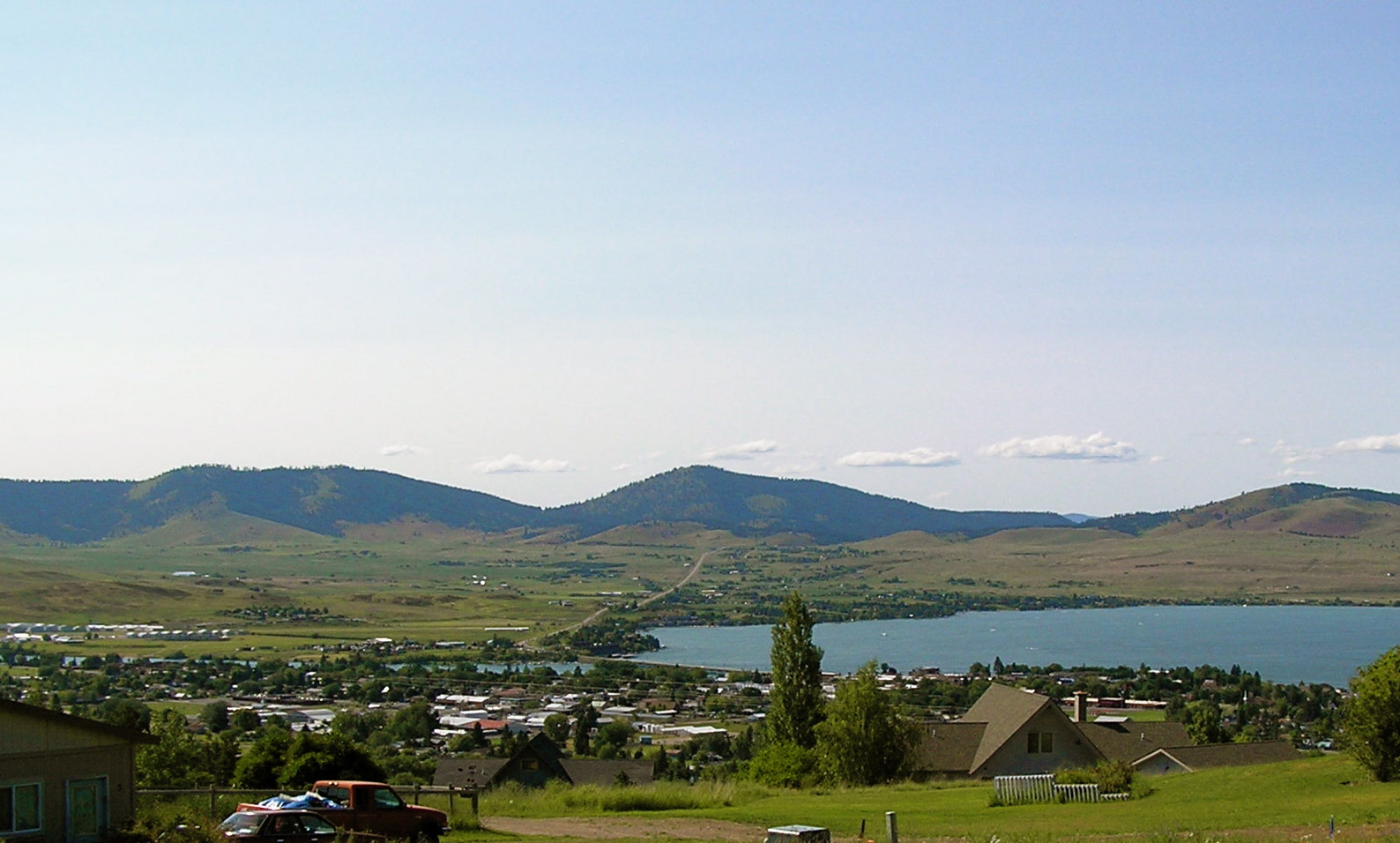
- Polson and Flathead Lake

- Location of Polson, Montana
- Coordinates: 47°41′24″N 114°07′35″W
- Country: United States
- State: Montana
- County: Lake

Area
  - Total: 4.66 sq mi (12.07 km^{2})
  - Land: 4.49 sq mi (11.63 km^{2})
  - Water: 0.17 sq mi (0.44 km^{2})
- Elevation: 3,028 ft (923 m)

Population (2020)
  - Total: 5,148
  - Density: 1,146.1/sq mi (442.53/km^{2})
- Time zone: UTC−7 (Mountain (MST))
  - Summer (DST): UTC−6 (MDT)
- ZIP code: 59860
- Area code: 406
- FIPS code: 30-58750
- GNIS feature ID: 2411452
- Website: www.cityofpolson.com

Polson (Montana Salish: nčmqnétkʷ, Kutenai: kwataqnuk) (/ˈpoʊlsən/, POHL-sən) is a city in Lake County, Montana, United States, on the southern shore of Flathead Lake and within the Flathead Indian Reservation. The population was 5,148 at the 2020 census. It is the county seat of Lake County. In 1898 the city was named after pioneer rancher David Polson. It was incorporated in 1910.

== Geography ==
U.S. Route 93 passes through town. Pablo National Wildlife Refuge is just to the south.

According to the United States Census Bureau, the city has a total area of 4.17 square miles (10.80 km^{2}), of which 4.14 square miles (10.72 km^{2}) is land and 0.03 square miles (0.08 km^{2}) is water.

== Demographics ==
Historical population
Census	Pop.	Note	%±
1920	1,132		—
1930	1,455		28.5%
1940	2,156		48.2%
1950	2,280		5.8%
1960	2,314		1.5%
1970	2,464		6.5%
1980	2,798		13.6%
1990	3,291		17.6%
2000	4,041		22.8%
2010	4,488		11.1%
2020	5,148		14.7%
U.S. Decennial Census

=== 2020 census ===
As of the 2020 census, Polson had a population of 5,148. The median age was 43.9 years. 20.9% of residents were under the age of 18 and 25.1% of residents were 65 years of age or older. For every 100 females there were 90.0 males, and for every 100 females age 18 and over there were 87.2 males age 18 and over.

98.4% of residents lived in urban areas, while 1.6% lived in rural areas.

There were 2,304 households in Polson, of which 27.3% had children under the age of 18 living in them. Of all households, 36.5% were married-couple households, 20.6% were households with a male householder and no spouse or partner present, and 36.1% were households with a female householder and no spouse or partner present. About 37.4% of all households were made up of individuals and 17.5% had someone living alone who was 65 years of age or older.

There were 2,723 housing units, of which 15.4% were vacant. The homeowner vacancy rate was 2.4% and the rental vacancy rate was 4.3%.

Racial composition as of the 2020 census
Race	Number	Percent
White	3,570	69.3%
Black or African American	20	0.4%
American Indian and Alaska Native	869	16.9%
Asian	23	0.4%
Native Hawaiian and Other Pacific Islander	0	0.0%
Some other race	58	1.1%
Two or more races	608	11.8%
Hispanic or Latino (of any race)	225	4.4%

=== 2010 census ===
As of the census of 2010, there were 4,488 people, 1,991 households, and 1,150 families living in the city. The population density was 1,084.1 inhabitants per square mile (418.6/km^{2}). There were 2,506 housing units at an average density of 605.3 per square mile (233.7/km^{2}). The racial makeup of the city was 74.7% White, 0.2% African American, 15.7% Native American, 0.8% Asian, 0.6% from other races, and 8.0% from two or more races. Hispanic or Latino of any race were 3.4% of the population.

There were 1,991 households, of which 29.1% had children under the age of 18 living with them, 38.6% were married couples living together, 13.9% had a female householder with no husband present, 5.3% had a male householder with no wife present, and 42.2% were non-families. 35.7% of all households were made up of individuals, and 15.9% had someone living alone who was 65 years of age or older. The average household size was 2.21 and the average family size was 2.86.

The median age in the city was 40 years. 24.2% of residents were under the age of 18; 9.1% were between the ages of 18 and 24; 22.4% were from 25 to 44; 24.5% were from 45 to 64; and 19.7% were 65 years of age or older. The gender makeup of the city was 46.9% male and 53.1% female.

=== 2000 census ===
As of the census of 2000, there were 4,041 people, 1,739 households, and 1,052 families living in the city. The population density was 1,490.9 inhabitants per square mile (575.6/km^{2}). There were 1,977 housing units at an average density of 729.4 per square mile (281.6/km^{2}). The racial makeup of the city was 78.25% White, 0.15% African American, 16.11% Native American, 0.47% Asian, 0.07% Pacific Islander, 0.45% from other races, and 4.50% from two or more races. Hispanic or Latino of any race were 2.25% of the population.

There were 1,739 households, out of which 31.1% had children under the age of 18 living with them, 42.7% were married couples living together, 13.2% had a female householder with no husband present, and 39.5% were non-families. 34.0% of all households were made up of individuals, and 16.7% had someone living alone who was 65 years of age or older. The average household size was 2.25 and the average family size was 2.86.

In the city, the population was spread out, with 25.6% under the age of 18, 8.7% from 18 to 24, 25.3% from 25 to 44, 20.9% from 45 to 64, and 19.6% who were 65 years of age or older. The median age was 39 years. For every 100 females there were 86.8 males. For every 100 females age 18 and over, there were 83.8 males.

The median income for a household in the city was $21,870, and the median income for a family was $30,833. Males had a median income of $21,113 versus $19,210 for females. The per capita income for the city was $13,777. About 16.0% of families and 19.8% of the population were below the poverty line, including 27.5% of those under age 18 and 12.2% of those age 65 or over.

== Climate ==
Polson has a continental climate (Köppen Dfb). However, its proximity to Flathead Lake, the largest natural freshwater body of water in the western United States, moderates its weather, meaning its winters are less cold and its summers generally less hot than adjacent areas of the same continental type.

Climate data for Polson, Montana
Month	Jan	Feb	Mar	Apr	May	Jun	Jul	Aug	Sep	Oct	Nov	Dec	Year
Record high °F (°C)	58 (14)	66 (19)	74 (23)	84 (29)	91 (33)	98 (37)	104 (40)	101 (38)	93 (34)	83 (28)	71 (22)	62 (17)	104 (40)
Mean daily maximum °F (°C)	32.6 (0.3)	38.2 (3.4)	46.7 (8.2)	57.2 (14.0)	65.8 (18.8)	73.5 (23.1)	81.5 (27.5)	81.2 (27.3)	70.0 (21.1)	56.6 (13.7)	41.1 (5.1)	33.1 (0.6)	56.5 (13.6)
Daily mean °F (°C)	26.6 (−3.0)	30.9 (−0.6)	37.7 (3.2)	46.1 (7.8)	53.9 (12.2)	61.1 (16.2)	67.5 (19.7)	67.4 (19.7)	57.6 (14.2)	46.6 (8.1)	34.6 (1.4)	27.4 (−2.6)	46.5 (8.0)
Mean daily minimum °F (°C)	20.5 (−6.4)	23.5 (−4.7)	28.7 (−1.8)	34.9 (1.6)	41.9 (5.5)	48.6 (9.2)	53.5 (11.9)	53.5 (11.9)	45.2 (7.3)	36.5 (2.5)	28.1 (−2.2)	21.6 (−5.8)	36.4 (2.4)
Record low °F (°C)	−30 (−34)	−27 (−33)	−10 (−23)	−1 (−18)	17 (−8)	26 (−3)	37 (3)	31 (−1)	16 (−9)	1 (−17)	−21 (−29)	−25 (−32)	−30 (−34)
Average precipitation inches (mm)	1.11 (28)	0.88 (22)	1.04 (26)	1.33 (34)	2.32 (59)	2.14 (54)	1.31 (33)	1.32 (34)	1.30 (33)	1.07 (27)	1.15 (29)	1.18 (30)	16.15 (409)
Source 1: NOAA (normals, 1971–2000)
Source 2: The Weather Channel (Records)

== Government ==
Polson uses a city commission consisting of six commissioners and the city mayor. In 2022 Eric Huffine was sworn in as mayor. He did not run for re-election in 2025. Laura Dever, a former commissioner, was elected to the four year term.

== Education ==
Polson School District educates students from kindergarten through 12th grade. In the 2021-2022 school year, Polson had 1,152 students in grades kindergarten to 8th grade. Polson High School had 511 students. The school's team name is the Pirates.

North Lake County Public Library is located in Polson.

== Media ==
=== Newspapers ===
- Flathead Beacon
- Lake County Leader
- Valley Journal

=== AM radio ===
- KERR
- KGEZ
- KJJR
- KOFI
- KQJZ-AM

=== FM radio ===
- KALS
- KANB-LP
- KBBZ
- KBCK
- KDBR
- KIBG The Big 100
- KKMT Star 99
- KQJZ-FM
- KQRK
- KRVO
- KUKL-FM
- KWOL-FM
- KXZI-LP
- KZMN

=== Television ===
Digital stations:

- KCFW (NBC), Channel 9
- KEXI-LD (Montana PBS), Channel 35
- K26DD-D (TBN), Channel 26
- KAJJ-CD (CBS), Channel 39
- KEXI-LD (Montana PBS), Channel 35
- KTMF-LD (ABC), Channel 36

KPAX Missoula, Montana

- K11HO-D Physical Channel 11, Display Channel 8, Polson

KTMF Missoula, Montana

- K14LT-D Physical Channel 14, Display Channel 23, Polson

KECI Missoula, Montana

- K16GJ-D Physical Channel 16, Display Channel 13, Polson

== Infrastructure ==
A hydro-electric concrete gravity-arch dam was built in 1938 in Polson at river mile 72 of the Flathead River. The Seli’š Ksanka Qlispe’ Dam is operated by the Confederated Salish and Kootenai Tribes. Formerly known as the Kerr Dam, it was renamed in 2015.

Polson Airport is a public use airport located one mile west of town.

== Gallery ==
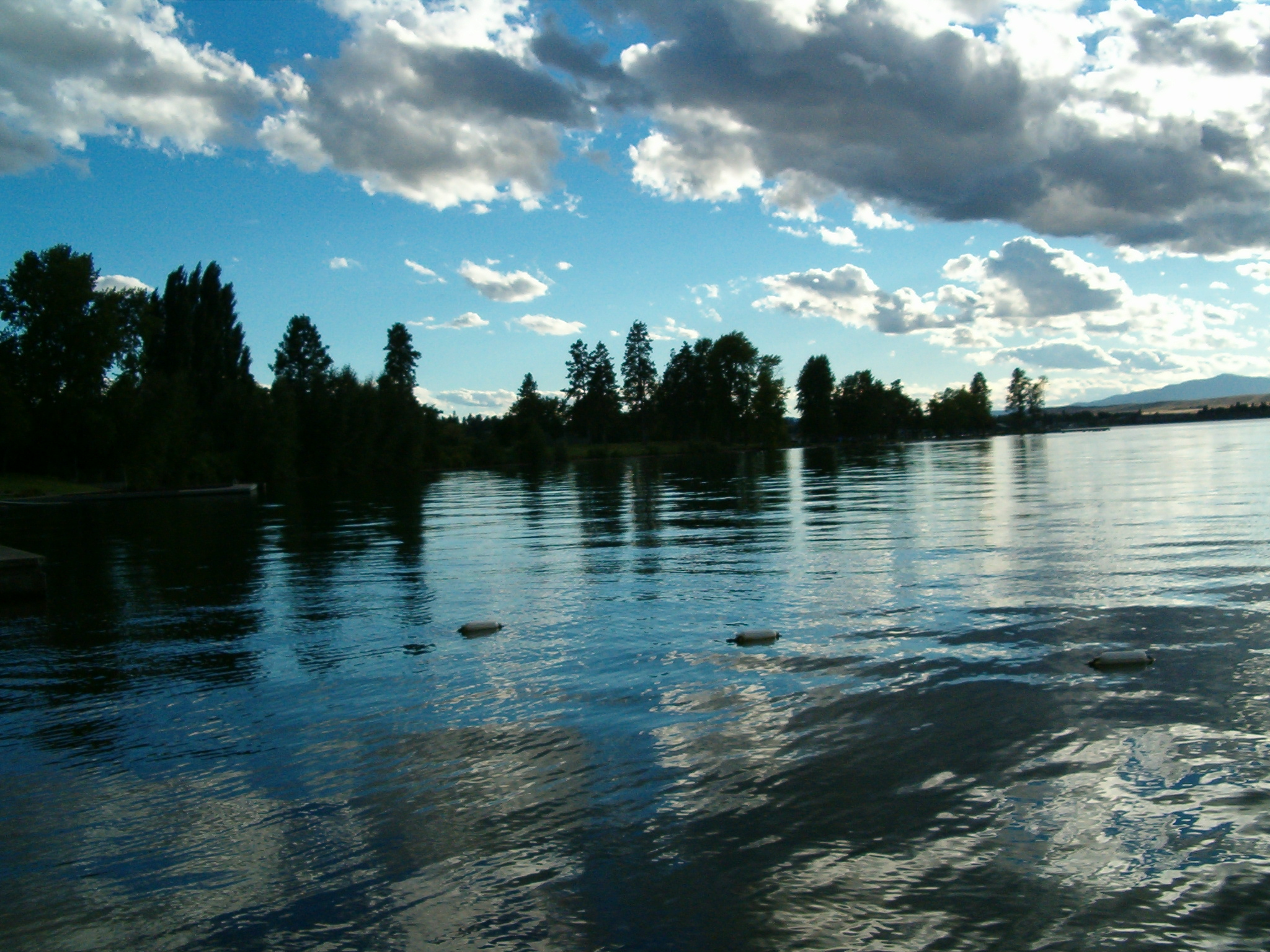
Some clouds over Flathead Lake in Polson Montana

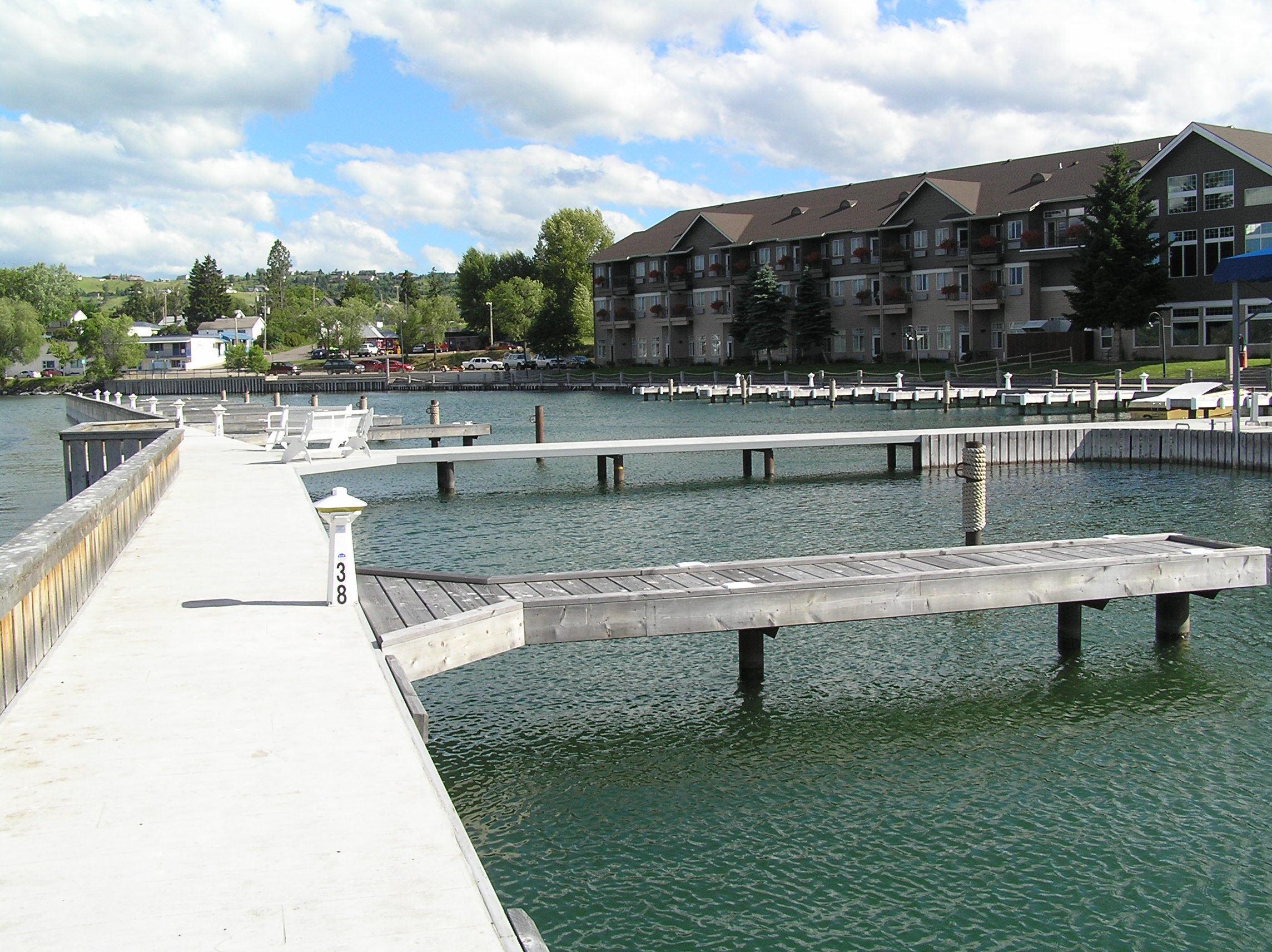
KwaTuqNuk resort in Polson

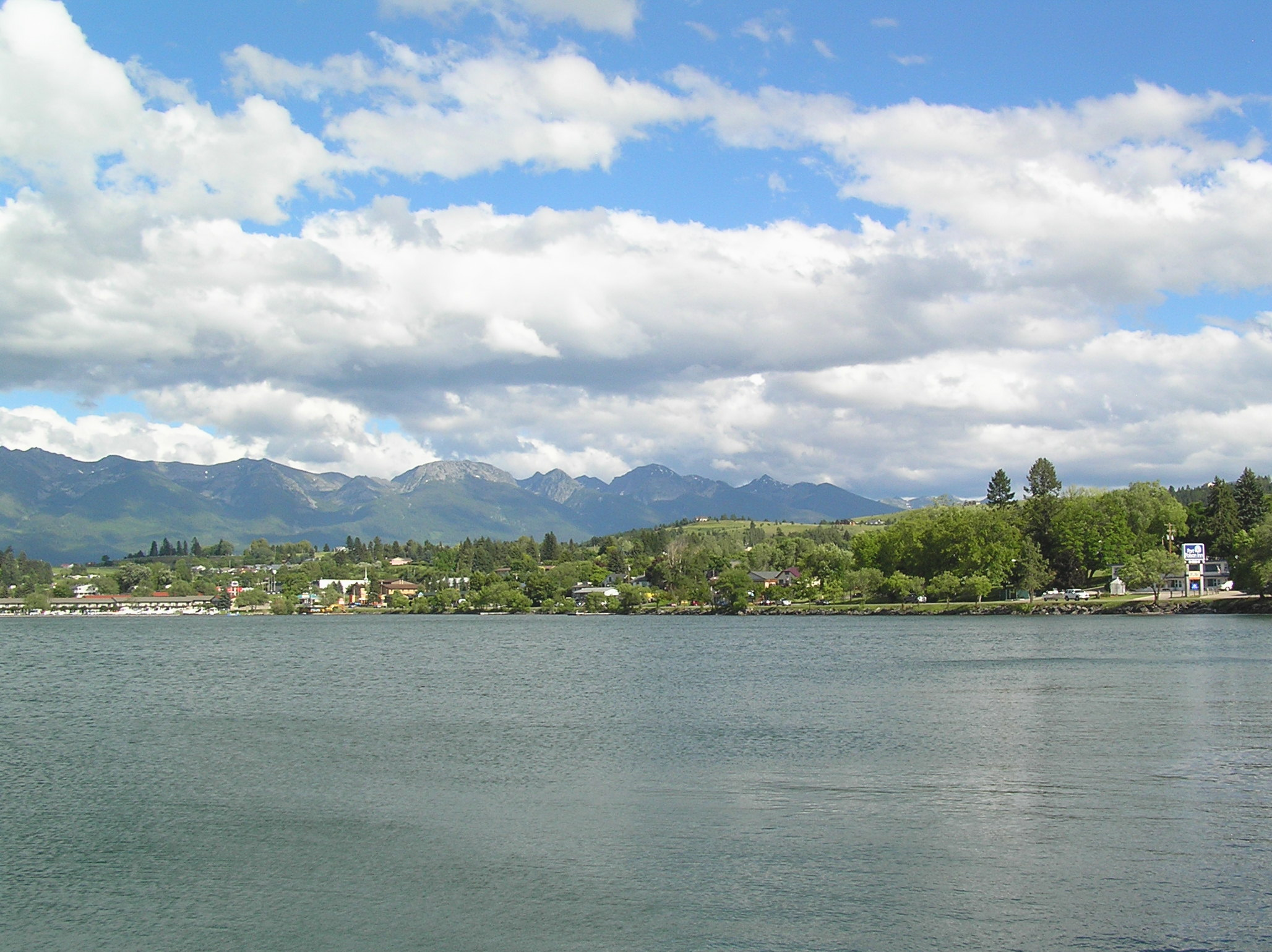
Polson, southern end of Flathead Lake
