= Glacier Institute =

US non-profit corporation

- Glacier Institute logo
- Formation: 1983
- Type: 501(c)(3) Non-profit corporation
- Purpose: Education
- Location: Columbia Falls, Montana
- Region served: Flathead Valley
- Executive Director: Anthony Nelson
- Website: glacierinstitute.org

The Glacier Institute (established in 1983) is a 501(c)(3) non-profit corporation located in Columbia Falls, Montana. According to the U.S. National Park Service, the Glacier Institute provides field-based learning experiences to the public, and serves as an official partner to the Glacier National Park, specializing in field seminars. The Glacier Institute also conducts fund-raising activities for its youth programs, which take place at its Big Creek Outdoor Education Center. The institute has been featured in a book Study Science at the Glacier Institute written by Bruce Larkin. Glacier Institute has three campuses: its headquarters in Columbia Falls, its Glacier Park Field Camp, located inside the West Glacier entrance of Glacier National Park, its Big Creek Outdoor Education Center, located in the Flathead National Forest.

Along with partnering with Flathead National Forest and Glacier National Park, the Glacier Institute is also a long-time partner with the Montana Fish, Wildlife and Parks Department, and Flathead Valley Community College.
