= KHNK =

KHNK may refer to:

- KHNK (AM), a radio station (1240 AM) licensed to Whitefish, Montana, United States
- KBCK (FM), a radio station (95.9 FM) licensed to Columbia Falls, Montana, which held the call sign KHNK from 2005 to 2025
