= Bruce Tutvedt =

American politician

Member of the Montana Senate from the 3rd district
- In office January 5, 2009 – January 2, 2017
- Preceded by: Jerry O'Neil
- Succeeded by: Keith Regier

Personal details
- Born: November 2, 1955 (age 70) Kalispell, Montana, U.S.
- Party: Republican
- Spouse: Sandy Tutvedt
- Education: Montana State University
- Occupation: Farmer

Bruce Tutvedt was a Republican Party member of the Montana Senate. He represented District 5 and then District 3.

== 2009 session ==
Tutvedt served his first session in the Republican-controlled upper chamber on the Montana Legislature.
