= Jerry O'Neil (politician) =

American politician

Member of the Montana House of Representatives from the 3rd district
- In office January 3, 2011 – January 7, 2015
- Preceded by: Dee L. Brown
- Succeeded by: Zac Perry

Member of the Montana Senate from the 3rd district
- In office January 3, 2005 – January 5, 2009
- Preceded by: Gerald Pease
- Succeeded by: Bruce Tutvedt

Member of the Montana Senate from the 42nd district
- In office January 3, 2001 – January 3, 2005
- Succeeded by: Dave Lewis

Personal details
- Born: May 10, 1943 (age 83) Kalispell, Montana, U.S.
- Party: Republican
- Education: Flathead Valley Community College
- Profession: Independent paralegal

Jerry O'Neil (born May 10, 1943) was a Republican member of the Montana Legislature. He served in the Montana Senate from 2000 to 2008. He was then elected to House District 3 representing the Columbia Falls area. In 2014, he lost the seat to Zac Perry in the general election. He filed for election in 2018, but was subsequently defeated.

== Personal life ==
O’Neil was born in Kalispell, Montana, in 1943, where his family owned a lumber yard. After graduating from Flathead High School in 1961, he attended Montana State University at Bozeman, University of Montana at Missoula, and FVCC in Kalispell.

== See also ==
- Montana House of Representatives, District 3
