= Jerry O'Neil =

Jerry O'Neil may refer to:

- Jerry O'Neil (racing driver)
- Jerry O'Neil (politician)
