= KWOL =

KWOL may refer to:

- KWOL-FM, a radio station (105.1 FM) licensed to Whitefish, Montana, United States
- KWOL-LP, a low-power radio station (103.7 FM) licensed to Arroyo Grande, California, United States
