= St. Richard's Church (Columbia Falls, Montana) =

Historic church in Montana, United States

Coordinates: 48.37393°N 114.18627°W

St. Richard's Church is a Gothic Revival former Catholic church located in Columbia Falls, Montana, United States, in the Diocese of Helena.

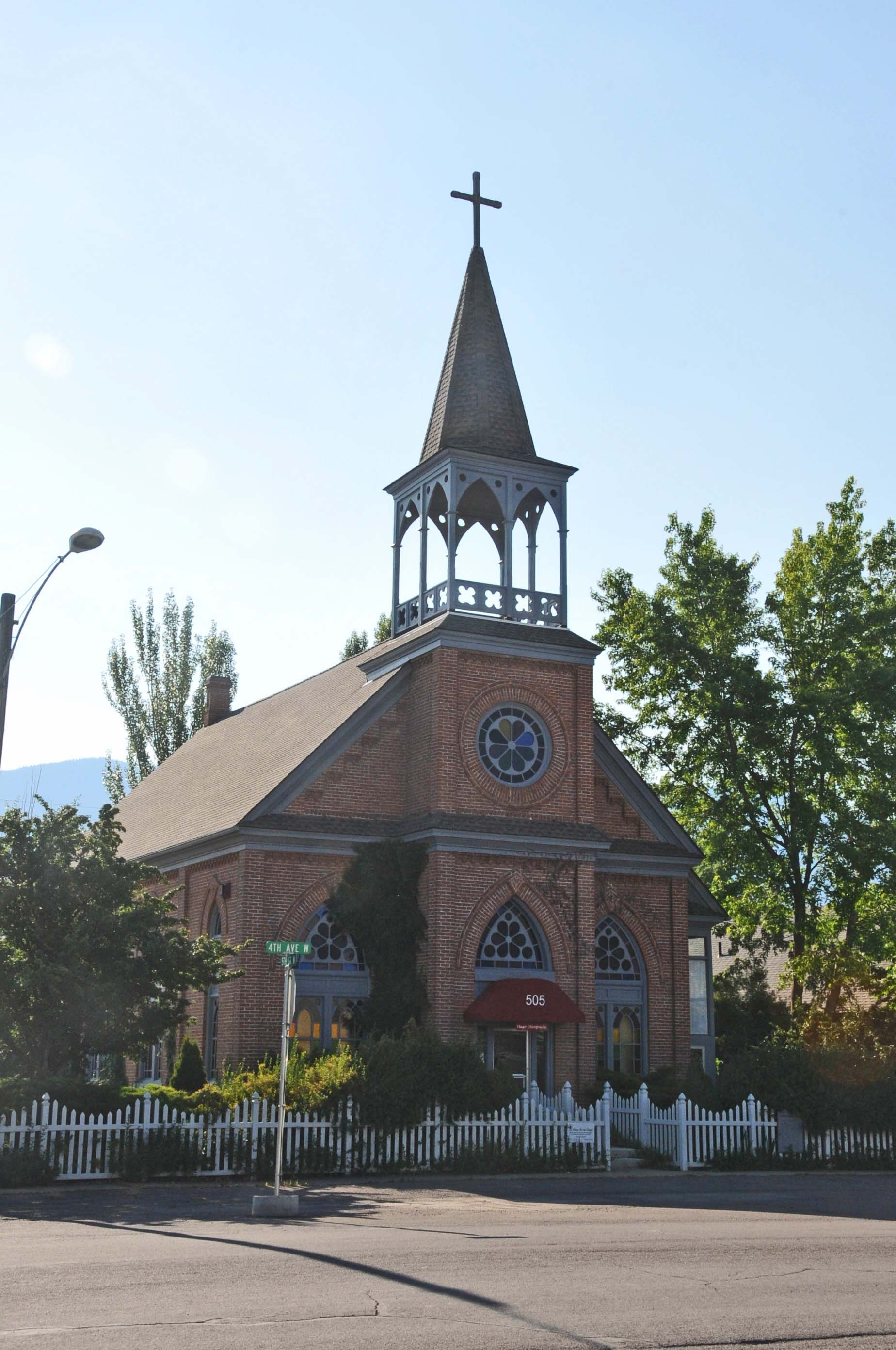
St. Richard's Church

St. Richard's was the first church in Northwestern Montana upon its completion in 1891. The clay used to make the bricks was sourced from the banks of the nearby Flathead River.

The building served as Columbia Falls' first public school during the weekdays. After World War II the parish outgrew the church and moved to a larger building. The building was added to the National Register of Historic Places in 1980.

Today the building is privately owned.

== See also ==
- Columbia Falls, Montana
- National Register of Historic Places in Flathead County
