= Flathead River Bridge =

Coordinates: 48.3618°N 114.1838°W

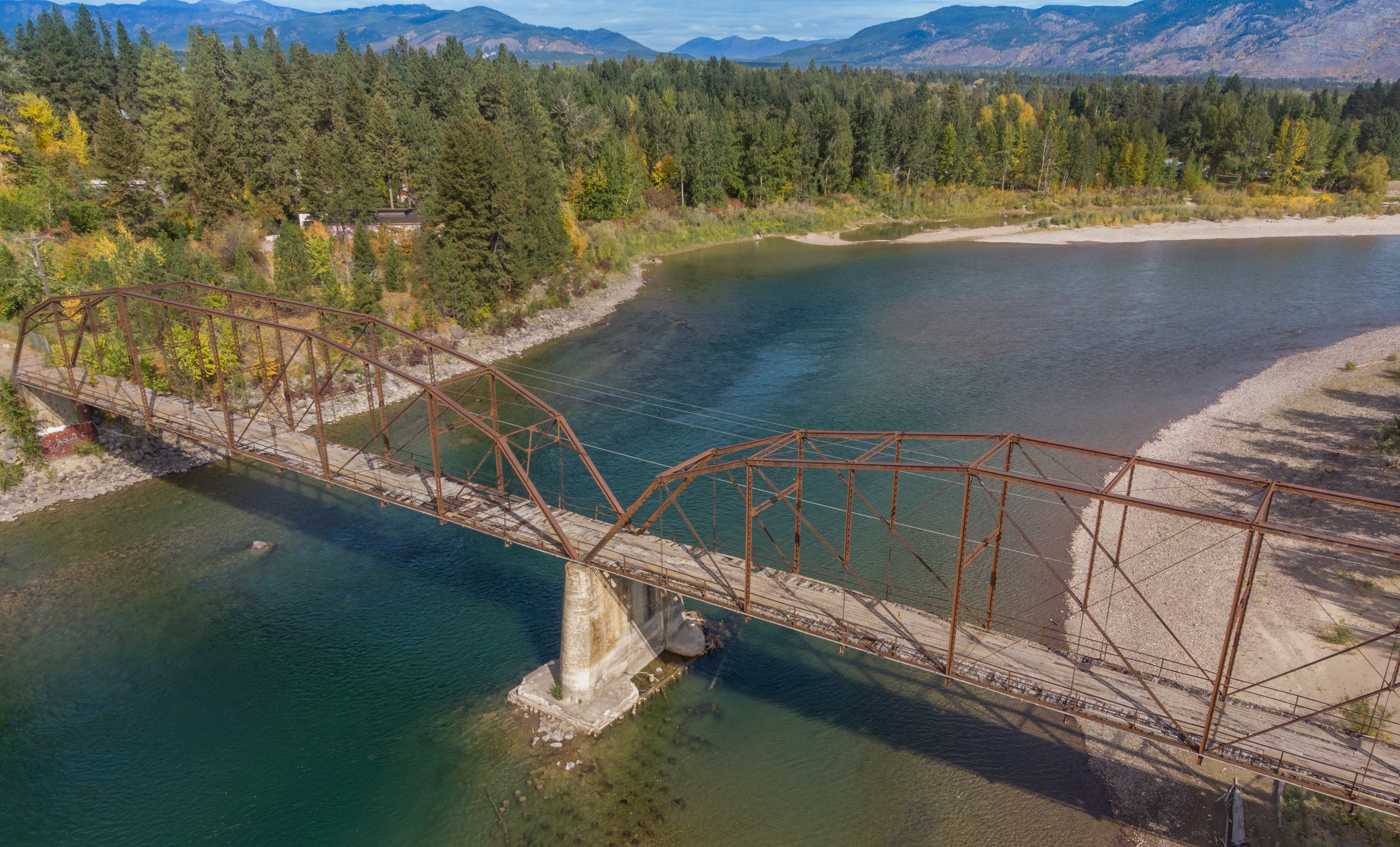
Aerial view

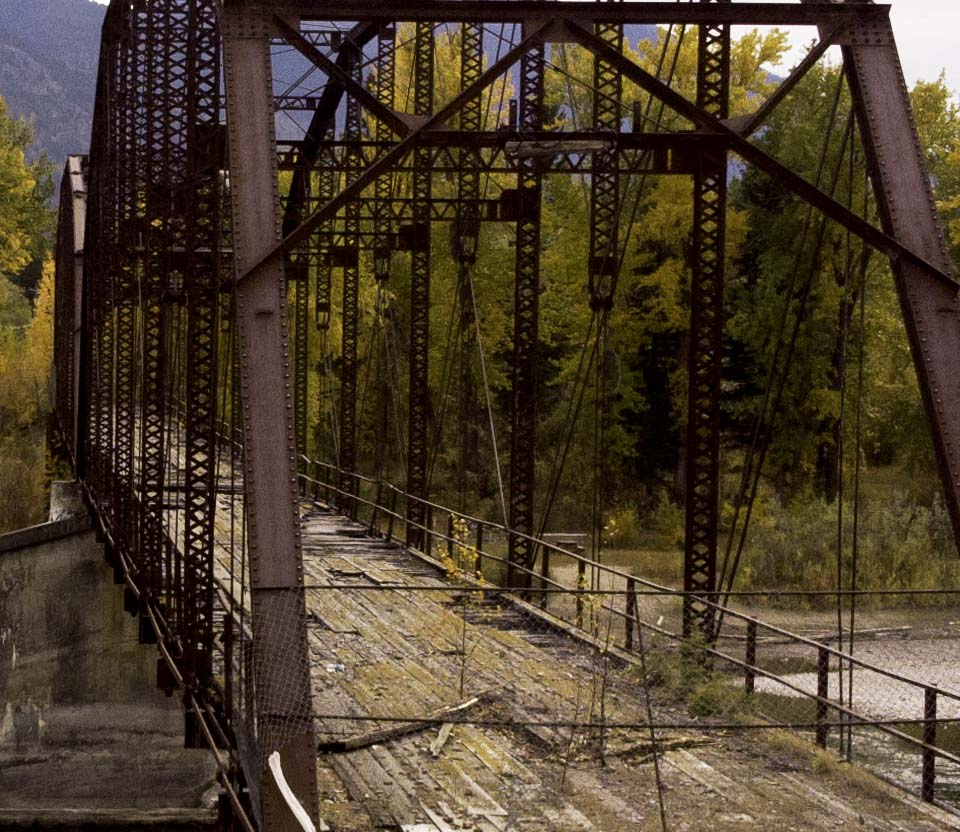
Abandoned bridge and roadbed

The Flathead River Bridge otherwise known as the Red Bridge is an abandoned steel truss bridge located at the south end of 4th Ave in Columbia Falls, Montana. The bridge was added to the National Register of Historic Places in 2010.

== History ==
Originally a wooden bridge was built on the location in the late 1800s, eventually it was sold to the county. In 1912, a new steel bridge was built only to be nearly swept away by the flood of 1913. The Red Bridge was reinforced and survived the flood in 1964, but was ultimately deemed unsafe for car traffic in 1989 and closed off to the public in 1992. The closure diverted traffic to U.S. Route 2.

== See also ==
- National Register of Historic Places listings in Flathead County, Montana
- Flathead River
