= Mel Ruder =

American journalist (1915–2000)

Melvin H. Ruder (January 19, 1915 – November 19, 2000) was an American journalist, Pulitzer Prize winner, publisher-emeritus of the Hungry Horse News in Columbia Falls, Montana.

== Early life ==
Mel Ruder was born January 19, 1915, in Manning, North Dakota. In 1937, Ruder graduated from the University of North Dakota with a bachelor's degree in journalism and a minor in European history. He would go on to graduate from Northwestern University with a master's degree in sociology in 1942. Ruder served three years as a US Naval officer during World War II.

== Career ==
In 1946, Ruder headed to Columbia Falls, MT where he created the Hungry Horse News which made its debut on August 8, 1946. Ruder's most notable work was his coverage of the June 1964 Flathead River flood, during which the Hungry Horse News published more than 12,000 copies in one week. At its peak in the 1960s, Ruder's Hungry Horse News publication had more than 9,000 weekly subscribers from every state. Ruder retired in 1978, after he sold the publication.

== Pulitzer Prize ==
In 1965, Ruder was awarded the Pulitzer Prize in the category of "Local General or Spot News Reporting". His award citation reads: "For his daring and resourceful coverage of a disastrous flood that threatened his community, an individual effort in the finest tradition of spot news reporting." Ruder was nominated by Montana writer Dorothy M. Johnson.

== Later life ==
in April 1999, Ruder suffered a major stroke. He died less than two years later at the Columbia Falls Veterans Home. Ruder was the subject of the book titled Pictures, a Park, and a Pulitzer: Mel Ruder and the Hungry Horse News. The book documents the first 32 years of the Hungry Horse News.
