= KBBZ =

Coordinates: 48.512°N 114.372°W

- Kalispell, Montana; United States
- Broadcast area: Kalispell-Flathead Valley
- Frequency: 98.5 MHz
- Branding: B98

Programming
- Format: Classic rock

Ownership
- Owner: Bee Broadcasting, Inc.
- Sister stations: KDBR; KJJR; KWOL-FM; KBCK; KHNK; KRVO

History
- First air date: 1983
- Former call signs: KFXC (4/1981-12/1981, CP); KFXZ (1981–1983, CP)

Technical information
- Licensing authority: FCC
- Facility ID: 4581
- Class: C
- ERP: 63,000 watts (horizontal); 6,300 watts (vertical)
- HAAT: 725 meters (2,379 ft)

Links
- Public license information: Public file; LMS
- Webcast: Listen Live
- Website: www.kbbz.com

KBBZ (98.5 FM, "B98") is a commercial radio station in Kalispell, Montana, broadcasting to the Kalispell-Flathead Valley, Montana, area. KBBZ airs a classic rock music format.

It is owned by Bee Broadcasting, Inc. All Bee Broadcasting stations are based at 2431 Highway 2 East, Kalispell.

Former logo
