= Woll House =

Historic house in Montana, United States

- U.S. National Register of Historic Places
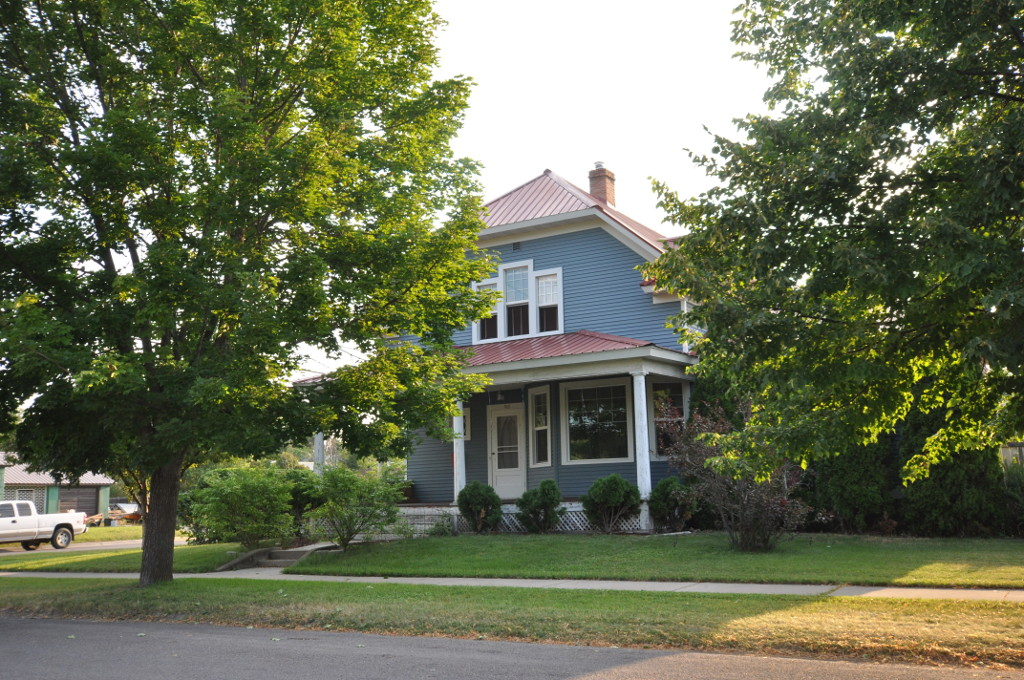

- Location within Montana
- Location: 905 Fourth Ave. W., Kalispell, Montana
- Coordinates: 48°11′20″N 114°18′55″W
- Area: less than one acre
- Built: 1908
- Built by: Louis Woll
- Architectural style: Colonial Revival
- MPS: Kalispell MPS
- NRHP reference No.: 94000922
- Added to NRHP: August 24, 1994

The Woll House, at 905 Fourth Ave. W. in Kalispell, Montana, was built in 1908. It was listed on the National Register of Historic Places in 1994.

It was deemed significant as "one of Kalispell's best-preserved Colonial Revival-style residences." It has a clipped gable (jerkinhead) roof.

A garage on the property is listed as a second contributing building.

The house was built as his own residence by local contractor Louis Woll, who also built many other fine residences as well as schools and churches in the town and nearby area.
