= George Everett =

American accountant, real estate broker, and politician from Montana

Member of the Montana House of Representatives from the 84th district
- In office January 6, 2003 – January 3, 2005
- Succeeded by: John Ward

Member of the Montana House of Representatives from the 5th district
- In office January 3, 2005 – January 5, 2009
- Preceded by: Norma Bixby
- Succeeded by: Keith Regier

Personal details
- Born: October 4, 1946 (age 79) Kalispell, Montana
- Party: Republican
- Spouse: Patti Everett
- Children: 2
- Education: University of Montana
- Occupation: Accountant, real estate broker

George Everett is an American accountant, real estate broker and former politician from Montana. Everett is a former Republican member of Montana House of Representatives.

== Early life and education ==
Everett was born in Kalispell, Montana on October 4, 1946.

Everett earned a Bachelor of Science degree from University of Montana in 1971.

== Career ==
Everett is a former accountant. In 1977, Everett became a real estate broker in Montana.

On November 5, 2002, Everett won the election and became a Republican member of Montana House of Representatives for District 84. Everett defeated Vince Woodhouse and Harm Toren with 69.99% of the votes.

On November 2, 2004, Everett won the election and became a Republican member of Montana House of Representatives for District 5. Everett defeated Samuel P. Nickel with 68.34% of the votes. On November 7, 2006, as an incumbent, Everett won the election and continued serving District 5. Everett defeated Linda Jaquette with 68.09% of the votes.

== Personal life ==
Everett's is married to Patti Everett and they have two children. Everett and his family live in Kalispell, Montana.

== See also ==
- Montana House of Representatives, District 5
