= Northwest Montana History Museum =

Museum in Kalispell, Montana

Coordinates: 48°11′52″N 114°18′39″W

The Northwest Montana History Museum
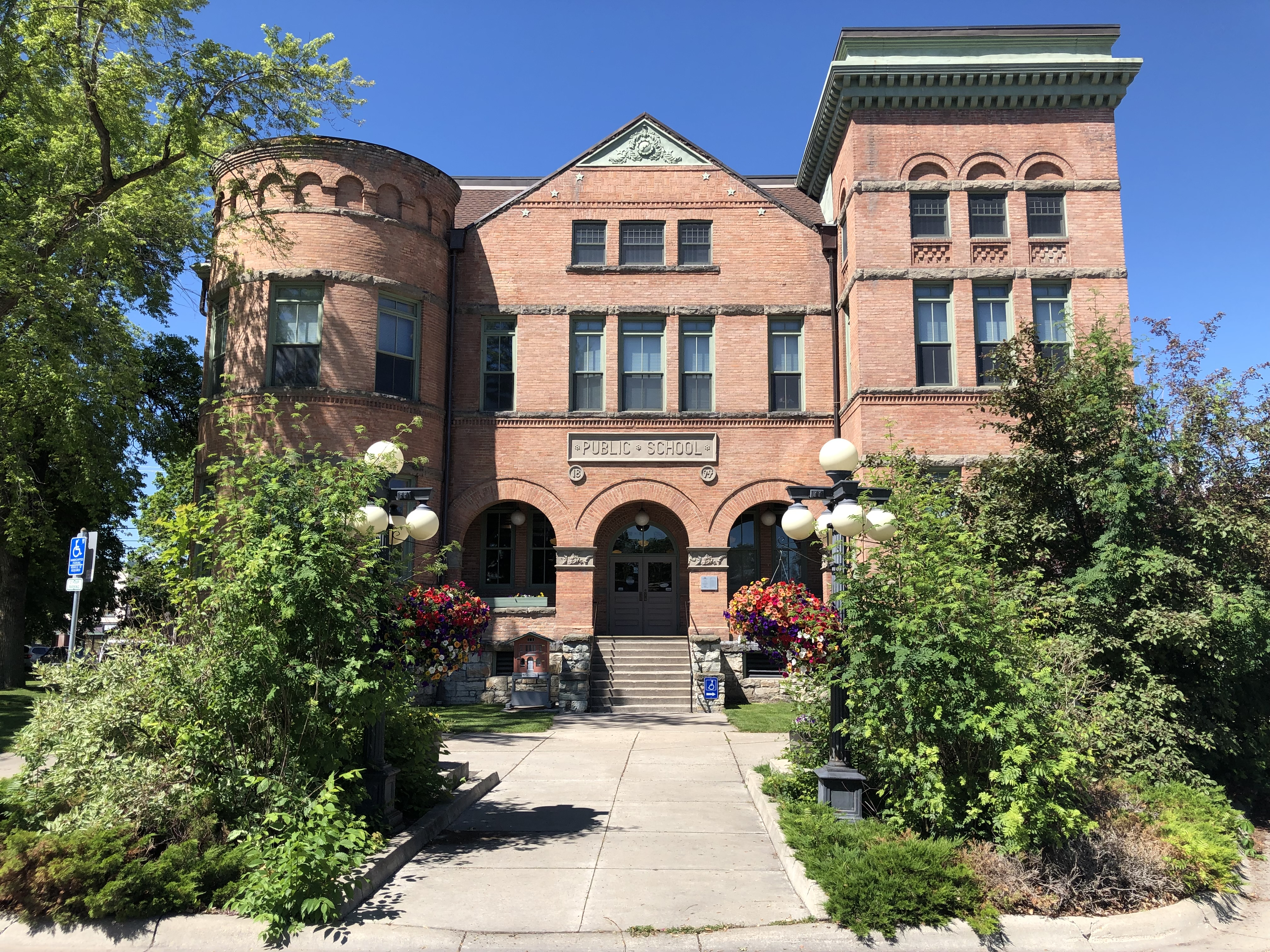
- Location: Kalispell, Montana
- Type: History

The Northwest Montana History Museum, at the restored Central School building in Kalispell, Montana, United States, is a history museum featuring exhibits that illuminate the history of the Northwest Montana region and Flathead Valley.

Operated by the non-profit Northwest Montana Historical Society, the Northwest Montana History Museum is housed in the 22,000-square-foot (2,000 m^{2}) Richardsonian Romanesque-style four-story stone and brick Central School building, constructed in 1894 and completely restored and renovated in the late 1990s.

Current permanent exhibits focus on Montana pioneer Frank Bird Linderman, the Northwest Montana timber industry, Northwest Native American culture, Flathead Valley history, Central School, and the turn-of-the-century community of Demersville.
