= KDBR =

- Kalispell, Montana; United States
- Broadcast area: Kalispell-Flathead Valley, Montana
- Frequency: 106.3 MHz
- Branding: 106.3 The Bear

Programming
- Format: Country
- Affiliations: Premiere Networks; Westwood One

Ownership
- Owner: Bee Broadcasting, Inc.
- Sister stations: KBBZ; KBCK; KHNK; KJJR; KWOL-FM; KRVO

History
- First air date: May 28, 1993
- Call sign meaning: The Bear

Technical information
- Licensing authority: FCC
- Facility ID: 12066
- Class: C
- ERP: 60,000 watts horizontal; 6,000 watts vertical
- HAAT: 721 meters (2,365 ft)
- Transmitter coordinates: 48°30′41.82″N 114°22′19.4″W

Links
- Public license information: Public file; LMS
- Webcast: Listen live
- Website: www.kdbr.com

KDBR (106.3 FM, "106.3 The Bear") is a radio station licensed to serve Kalispell, Montana. The station is owned by Bee Broadcasting, Inc. It airs a country music format.

All Bee Broadcasting stations are based at 2431 Highway 2 East, Kalispell.

The station was assigned the KDBR call letters by the Federal Communications Commission on May 28, 1993.
