= Polson Airport =

- IATA: none; ICAO: none; FAA LID: 8S1

Summary
- Airport type: Public
- Owner: City of Polson & Lake County
- Serves: Polson, Montana
- Elevation AMSL: 2,941 ft / 896 m
- Coordinates: 47°41′44″N 114°11′07″W

Map
- Location of airport in Montana

Runways
Direction	Length		Surface
Direction	ft	m	Surface
18/36	4,195	1,279	Asphalt
3W/21W	4,000	1,219	Water

Statistics (2008)
- Aircraft operations: 9,750
- Based aircraft: 30
- Source: Federal Aviation Administration

Polson Airport (FAA LID: 8S1) is a public use airport in Lake County, Montana, United States. It is located one nautical mile (2 km) west of the central business district of Polson, a city on the southern shore of Flathead Lake. The airport is owned by the City of Polson and Lake County. It is included in the National Plan of Integrated Airport Systems for 2011–2015, which categorized it as a general aviation facility.

== Facilities and aircraft ==
Polson Airport covers an area of 97 acres (39 ha) at an elevation of 2,941 feet (896 m) above mean sea level. It has one asphalt paved runway designated 18/36 which measures 4,195 by 75 feet (1,279 x 23 m). It also has a seaplane landing area designated 3W/21W with a water surface measuring 4,000 by 500 feet (1,219 x 152 m).

For the 12-month period ending July 22, 2008, the airport had 9,750 aircraft operations, an average of 26 per day: 97% general aviation, 2% air taxi, and 1% military. At that time there were 30 aircraft based at this airport: 90% single-engine, 3% jet, 3% helicopter, and 3% glider.

== See also ==
- List of airports in Montana
