= KGEZ =

- Kalispell, Montana; United States
- Broadcast area: Kalispell, Montana; Whitefish, Montana
- Frequency: 600 kHz
- Branding: KGEZ 600 AM

Programming
- Format: Full service

Ownership
- Owner: John Hendricks; (Flathead Valley Wireless Association, LLC)

History
- First air date: 1927

Technical information
- Licensing authority: FCC
- Facility ID: 60575
- Class: B
- Power: 5,000 watts (day); 1,000 watts (night)
- Transmitter coordinates: 48°9′40″N 114°16′51″W
- Translator: 96.5 K243CM (Kalispell)

Links
- Public license information: Public file; LMS
- Webcast: Listen Live
- Website: kgez.com

KGEZ (600 AM) is an American broadcast radio station licensed to Kalispell, Montana and serving the Flathead region of western Montana. KGEZ is owned and operated by John Hendricks, President and GM of Flathead Valley Wireless Association, LLC. The KGEZ frequency is 600 kHz, a regional broadcast frequency.

== History ==
KGEZ is Montana's second–oldest station, and the oldest in the Flathead. It first signed on in 1927. The station was assigned these call letters by the Federal Communications Commission.

On July 9, 1957, KGEZ opened a TV station. KGEZ-TV affiliated with CBS and NBC, switching to and from the signal of KXLY-TV in Spokane for CBS programming. It was the first television station in the Flathead region. The station went off the air on April 2, 1958 after a week of raising funds to continue operating the station. KGEZ-TV went back on the air on October 20, 1958. The station changed its call letters to KULR in November 1958. KULR went off for good on May 27, 1959 because of transmitter problems. The license was returned to the FCC on February 21, 1962.

=== John Stokes era ===
From 2000 to 2009, it was owned by conservative activist John Stokes, and aired a News/Talk format under the moniker "Z-600, The Edge." Its flagship program was a conservative-oriented talk show hosted by Stokes.

=== Seizure ===
On September 24, 2009; KGEZ went silent after being seized by the United States Bankruptcy Court for Montana. In the spring of 2008, John Stokes was sued by Todd and Davar Gardner, who claimed Stokes had slandered them on his show in 2007. Stokes lost, and faced having to pay $3.8 million in damages, an amount that he claimed would have forced him out of business. To avoid paying, he filed for Chapter 11 bankruptcy. In April 2009, the Office of the U.S. Trustee asked that the filing be converted to a Chapter 7, claiming that Stokes hadn't disclosed all of his assets and debts. Stokes responded with a request to withdraw the filing. On September 21, 2009 bankruptcy judge Ralph Kirscher issued an order denying Stokes' request and granting the government's request to switch to a Chapter 7.

In his ruling, Kirscher said Stokes had failed to disclose "literally millions of dollars" in assets and had not paid taxes in several years. Stokes was in the midst of his show when federal marshals and Flathead County sheriff's deputies arrived to seize the station; he simply thanked his listeners and signed off. Stokes himself said he'd been losing $40,000 per month operating the station.

=== Post-Stokes ===
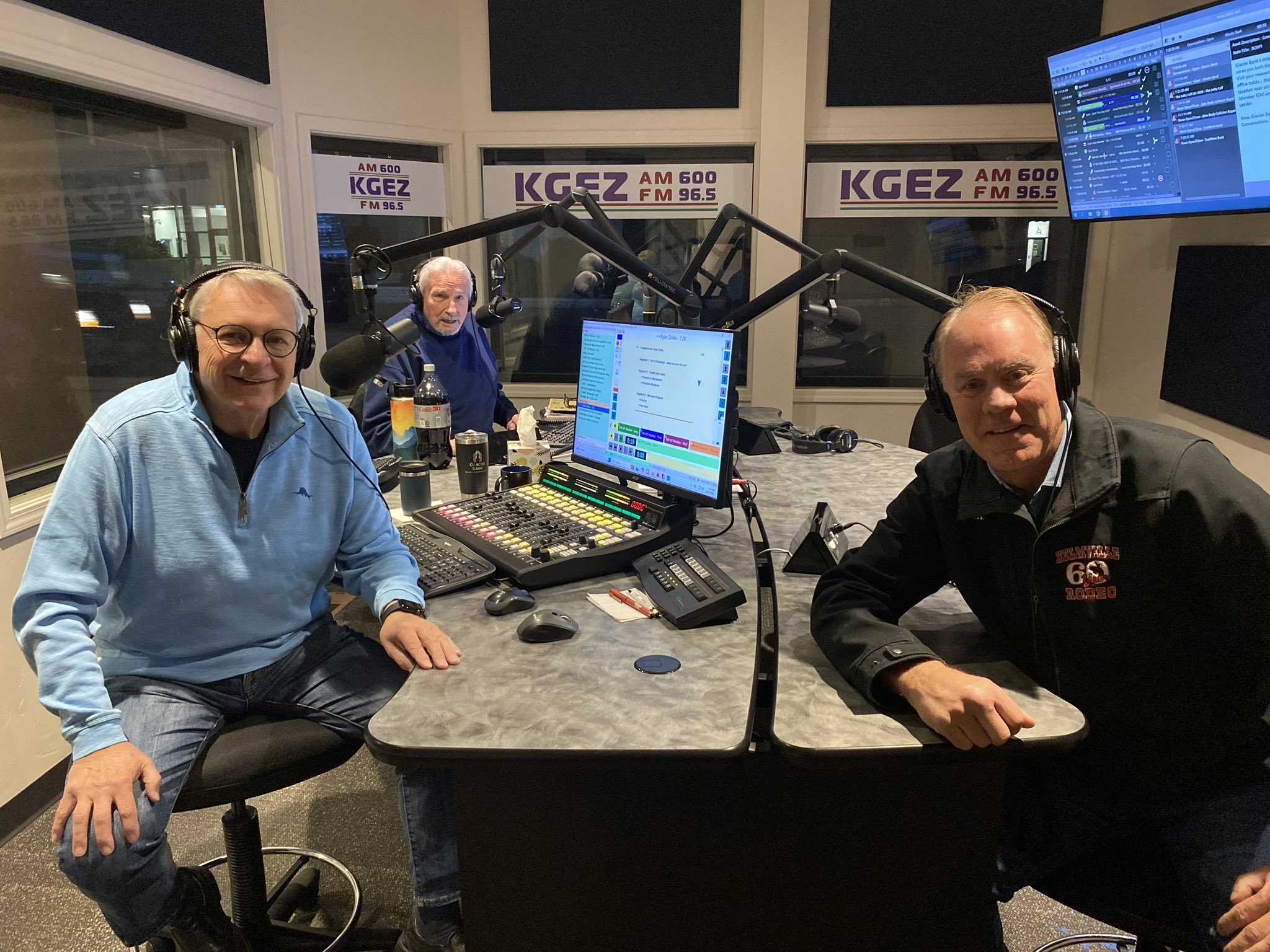
Representative Ryan Zinke (right) at KGEZ on October 22, 2025.

In July 2010, a local bankruptcy judge awarded a partial settlement to the Gardners in which they acquired KGEZ's assets (license, broadcasting facilities, and studio property) for $875,000 in cash. That sum is part of deal reducing the amount the Gardners were owed by Stokes to $1.5 million.

In October 2010, John Stokes filed an appeal, challenging the settlement that transferred KGEZ's assets to Todd and Davar Gardner in July. The appeal, filed in U.S. District Court, states that the bankruptcy court erred when it approved the settlement.

The Gardners filed a "Resumption of Operations" notice with the FCC on September 8, 2010 via licensee Flathead Broadcasting, LLC.

Shortly after the Gardners took over ownership of the station, John Hendricks took charge of KGEZ's programming and operations under a local marketing agreement. He recruited longtime Flathead Valley broadcaster George Ostrom for on-air commentary. It returned to the air in late January 2011 with a marathon of 1950s’ and 1960s’ rock hits. Regular programming resumed on February 8, 2011. Originally airing oldies, Hendricks gradually expanded the station into a community-oriented full service station. The Gardners have since sold the station to Hendricks, who formed the Flathead Valley Wireless Association to run it.

Currently, the station airs a schedule of almost entirely locally originated programming, a rarity for stations in such a small market.

== Translator ==
Broadcast translator for KGEZ
Call sign	Frequency	City of license	FID	ERP (W)	HAAT	Class	Transmitter coordinates	FCC info
K243CM	96.5 FM	Kalispell, Montana	138703	250	0 m (0 ft)	D	48°10′33.9″N 114°21′0.2″W	LMS
