= Keith Regier =

American educator, businessman and politician from Montana

Member of the Montana Senate from the 3rd district
- In office January 2, 2017 – January 5, 2025
- Preceded by: Bruce Tutvedt
- Succeeded by: Carl Glimm

Member of the Montana House of Representatives from the 4th district
- In office January 7, 2015 – January 2, 2017
- Preceded by: Ed Lieser
- Succeeded by: Matt Regier

Member of the Montana House of Representatives from the 5th district
- In office January 5, 2009 – January 7, 2015
- Preceded by: George Everett
- Succeeded by: Ed Lieser

Personal details
- Born: 1951 (age 74–75)
- Party: Republican
- Spouse: Jolene Regier
- Children: 3, including Matt Regier and Amy Regier
- Education: University of Nebraska–Lincoln (BS)
- Occupation: Business owner, retired teacher

Keith Regier (born 1951) is an American politician, business owner, and retired teacher from Montana. Regier served as a Republican member of Montana Senate for District 3 from 2017-2025. He also served as a member of the Montana House of Representatives from 2007 to 2017.

== Education ==
Regier earned a Bachelor of Science degree in Education from the University of Nebraska–Lincoln.

== Career ==
Regier was a teacher. As a businessman, Regier became the owner of Stillwater Sod.

In November 2008, Regier was elected to Montana House of Representatives District 5 which represents the Kalispell area. After the 2010 census he was reassigned to District 4. He was selected as the majority whip in the 2011 legislative session. Regier served as Majority Leader during the 2015-2016 session.

In 2016, he was elected to Senate District 3. The seat was vacated by Bruce Tutvedt due to term limits.

In 2021, Regier promoted a conspiracy theory that tiny tracking devices were being inserted into COVID-19 vaccine doses. During public debate in the Montana Senate, Regier stated, "I've read articles about putting a little chip in with the vaccine... what if that is federally approved and the employer requires that?"

== Personal life ==
Regier's wife is Jolene Regier. They have three children. Regier and his family live in Kalispell, Montana. Two of Regier's children, Amy Regier and Matt Regier, are Republican members of the Montana House of Representatives.

== See also ==
- Montana House of Representatives, District 4
- Montana House of Representatives, District 5
