= KBCK (FM) =

Coordinates: 48.512°N 114.372°W

- Columbia Falls, Montana; United States
- Broadcast area: Kalispell-Flathead Valley
- Frequency: 95.9 MHz
- Branding: KBCK 95.9

Programming
- Format: Classical

Ownership
- Owner: Bee Broadcasting, Inc.
- Sister stations: KDBR; KJJR; KWOL-FM; KHNK; KBBZ; KRVO

History
- First air date: 1995
- Former call signs: KCWX (1992–1997); KKMT (1997–2005); KHNK (2005–2025)

Technical information
- Licensing authority: FCC
- Facility ID: 22255
- Class: C
- ERP: 56,000 watts horizontal; 5,600 watts vertical
- HAAT: 697 meters (2,287 ft)

Links
- Public license information: Public file; LMS
- Website: www.kbckfm.org

KBCK (95.9 FM; "KBCK 95.9") is a commercial radio station in Columbia Falls, Montana, broadcasting to the Kalispell-Flathead Valley, Montana, area. KBCK airs a classical music format.

It is owned by Bee Broadcasting, Inc. All Bee Broadcasting stations are based at 2431 Highway 2 East, Kalispell.

== History ==
KHNK changed to country when KKMT moved. Before then 95.9's format played variations of adult contemporary and hot adult contemporary music.

The call sign was changed to KBCK on February 17, 2025; the KHNK moved to the former KSAM. The station is playing classical music at the moment.
