= KWOL-FM =

Coordinates: 48.512°N 114.371°W

- Whitefish, Montana; United States
- Broadcast area: Kalispell-Flathead Valley
- Frequency: 105.1 MHz
- Branding: Kool 105.1

Programming
- Format: Classic hits

Ownership
- Owner: Rose Communications
- Operator: Bee Broadcasting
- Sister stations: KDBR; KJJR; KBCK; KHNK; KBBZ; KRVO

History
- First air date: 2005

Technical information
- Licensing authority: FCC
- Facility ID: 164257
- Class: C
- ERP: 62,000 watts
- HAAT: 733 meters (2,405 ft)

Links
- Public license information: Public file; LMS
- Webcast: Listen live
- Website: www.1051cool.com

KWOL-FM (105.1 MHz, "Kool 105.1") is a commercial radio station in Whitefish, Montana, broadcasting to the Kalispell-Flathead Valley, Montana, area. KWOL airs a classic hits music format.

Former logo

It is owned by Rose Communications, and operated by Bee Broadcasting, Inc. All Bee Broadcasting stations are based at 2431 Highway 2 East, Kalispell.
