= KXZI-LP =

- Kalispell, Montana; United States
- Frequency: 101.9 MHz
- Branding: Montana Radio Cafe

Programming
- Format: Variety

Ownership
- Owner: Scott Johnston; (The Cross Works Ministries)

History
- First air date: March 15, 2004

Technical information
- Licensing authority: FCC
- Facility ID: 134546
- Class: L1
- ERP: 100 watts
- HAAT: −49.5 meters (−162 ft)
- Transmitter coordinates: 48°12′37″N 114°09′25″W

Links
- Public license information: LMS
- Webcast: Listen Live
- Website: montanaradiocafe.org

KXZI-LP (101.9 FM, "Montana Radio Cafe") is a radio station licensed to serve Kalispell, Montana. The station is owned by Scott Johnston and the broadcast license is held by The Cross Works Ministries. KXZI-LP airs a variety format described as "front porch" music.

== History ==
This station received its original construction permit from the Federal Communications Commission on November 18, 2002. The new station was assigned the KXZI-LP call sign by the FCC on October 21, 2003. KXZI-LP received its license to cover from the FCC on April 27, 2005.
