= Blacktail Mountain Ski Area =

Ski area in Montana, United States

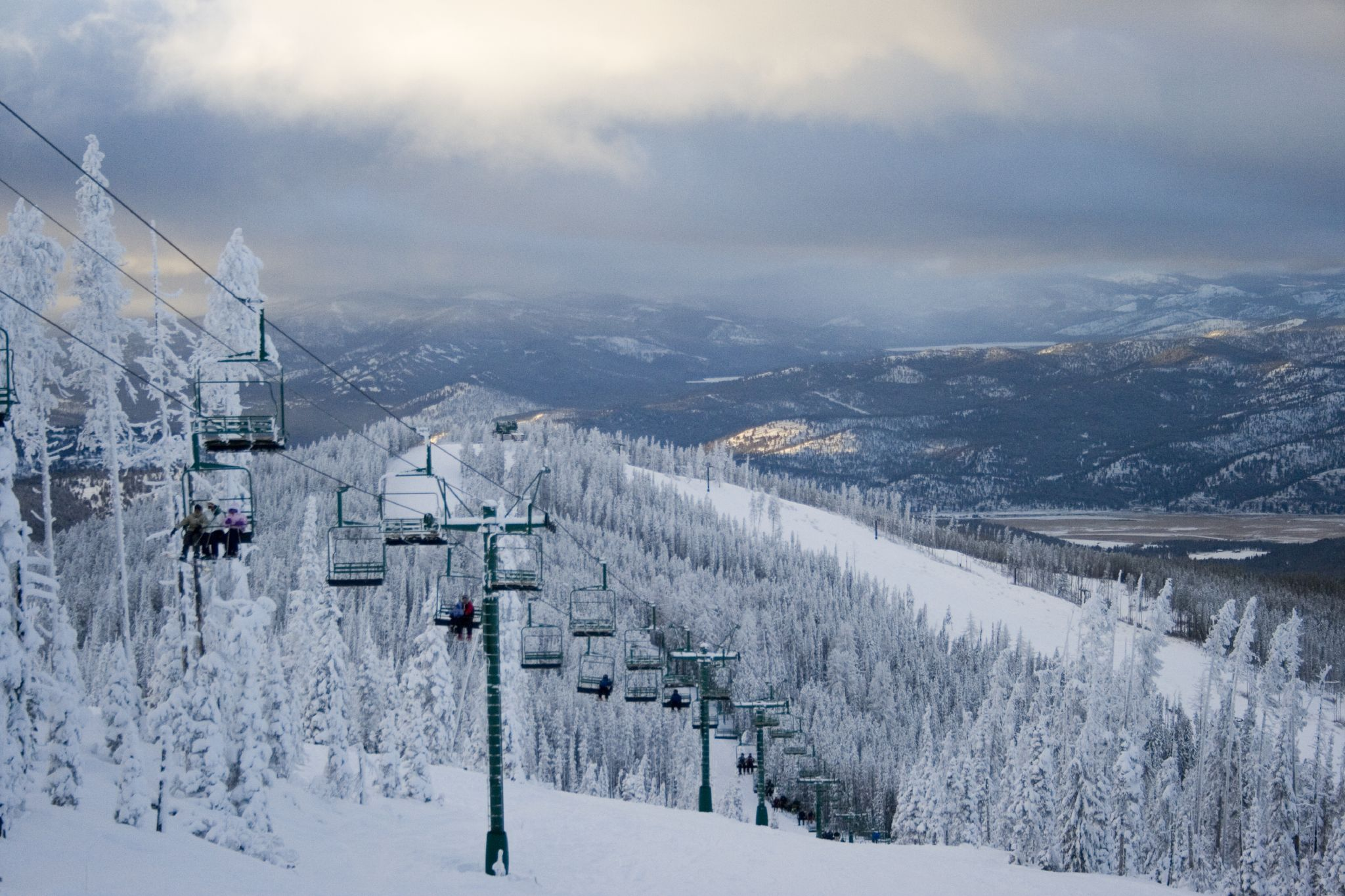
- Ski lift in 2008

- Location in Montana Blacktail Mountain Ski Area (the United States)
- Location: Lakeside, Montana
- Nearest city: Kalispell, Montana
- Coordinates: 48°00′47″N 114°14′49″W
- Vertical: 1,553 ft (473 m)
- Top elevation: 6,789 ft (2,069 m)
- Base elevation: 5,236 ft (1,596 m)
- Trails: 26: 15% beginner; 70% intermediate; 15% advanced
- Longest run: 1.75 m (5 ft 9 in)
- Lift system: 1 Triple, 2 Double, 1 Handle Tow
- Snowfall: 250 inches
- Website: Official website

Blacktail Mountain Ski Area is an alpine ski area in northwestern Montana rising above the western shore of Flathead Lake.

== Lifts and Trails ==
Blacktail mountain has four ski lifts, one triple chair, two double chairs, and one handle tow. The triple chair, called Olympic, runs up the centre of the ski area, with the two double chairs, Thunderhead and Crystal, to the west and east of Olympic, respectively. The rope tow runs on a small training hill for beginner skiers. The ski area has 26 runs, 15% beginner, 65% intermediate, 20% expert, and also includes a terrain park. Two of the expert trails run through an open field of trees that can be skied through.

== Services ==
The Blacktail Mountain lodge is equipped with a ski rental service, a dining area, and a restaurant. A PDF file of the ski rental form can be found online.

== Gallery ==
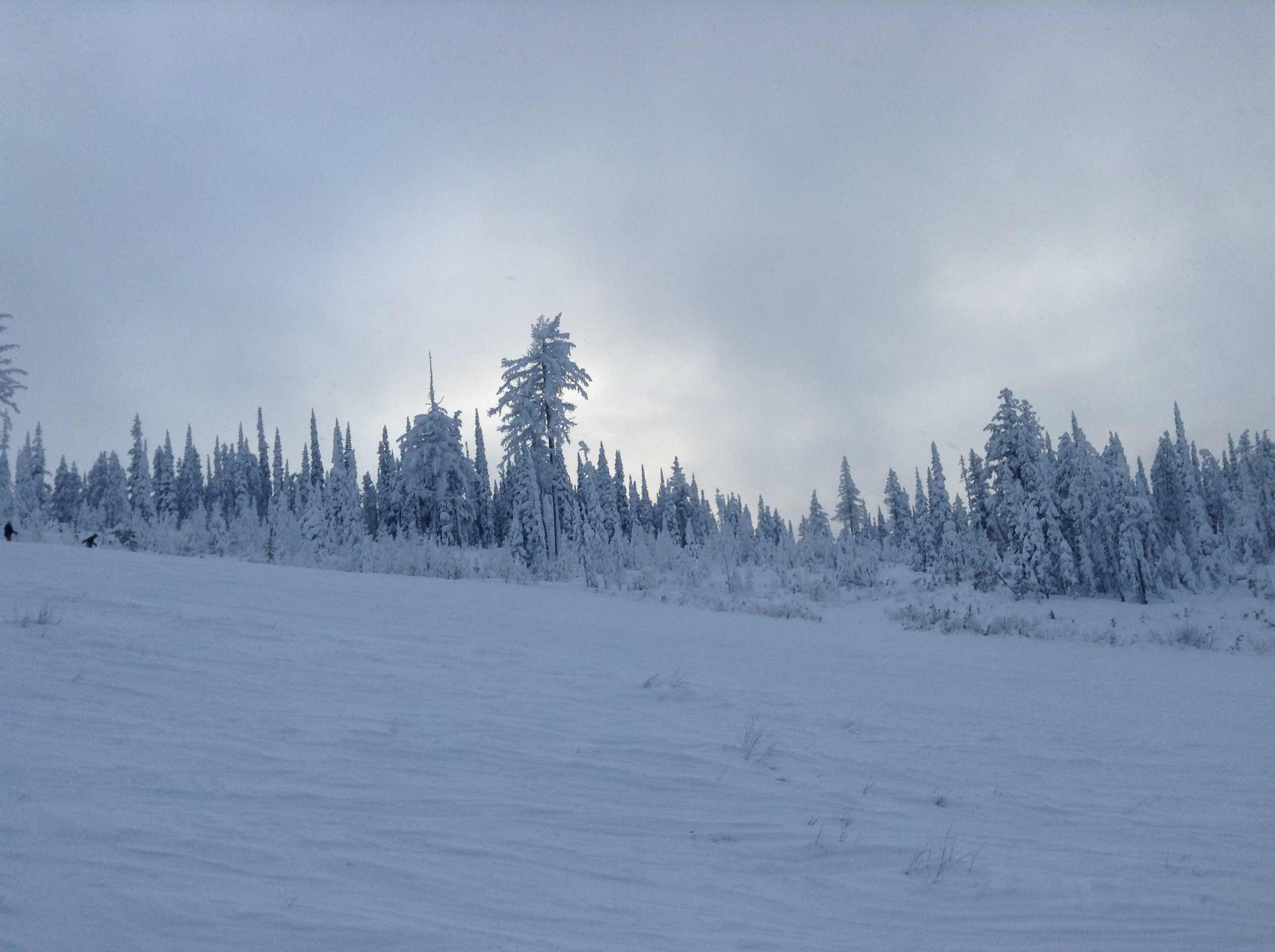
A view on the Cold Camp run in December 2015

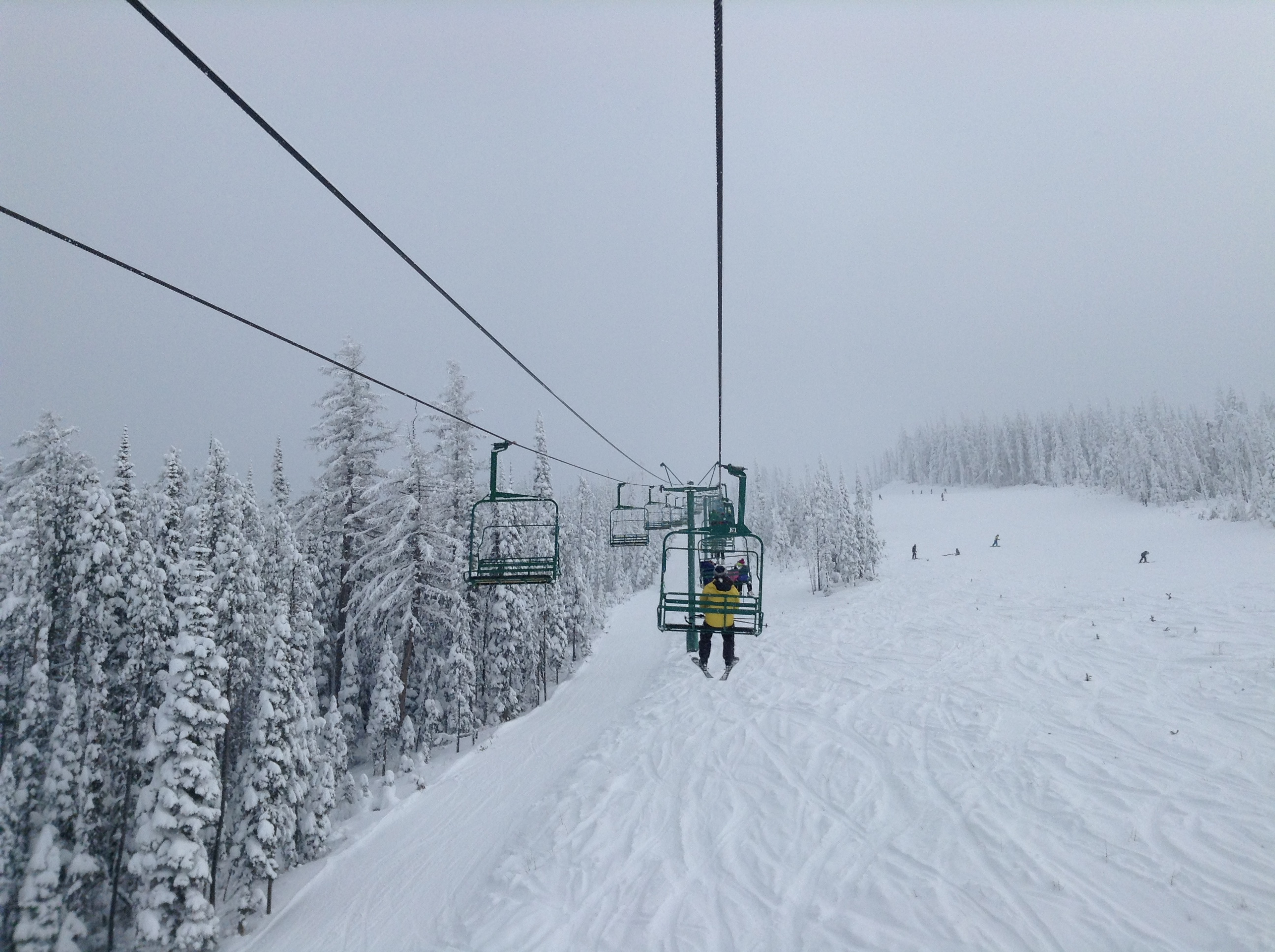
View from the Olympic triple chair
