= Flathead Beacon =

Newspaper based in Montana, U.S.

- Type: Weekly newspaper
- Editor-in-chief: Kellyn Brown
- Founded: 2007
- Language: English
- Headquarters: 17 Main St. Kalispell, MT, 59901; US
- Circulation: 25,000
- Website: flatheadbeacon.com

The Flathead Beacon is an American weekly newspaper serving northwest Montana, owned by the American television personality Maury Povich.

== History ==
=== Founding ===
The Flathead Beacon was founded in 2007 by Maury Povich, who was best known for hosting the talk show Maury. But Povich had roots in traditional journalism. His father, Shirley Povich, covered sports for The Washington Post. Maury Povich started his career as a television news anchor, and he started a new news outlet to honor his father's legacy. Povich owns a home with his wife, Connie Chung, in Bigfork, Montana.

=== Switching to online-only format ===
On March 21, 2023, the Flathead Beacon announced plans to cease its weekly print edition after 16 years, to go into effect starting April. The Flathead Living quarterly lifestyle magazine will continue its print publication, and the number of newsroom employees will not change, nor would the paper's price point.

== Operations ==
The first edition of the Beacon was published on May 23, 2007, and was 24 page tabloid. The founding, and current, editor-in-chief is Kellyn Brown.

== Recognition ==
The Montana Newspaper Association named the Flathead Beacon the state's best large weekly 10 times since 2009. In 2014, Outside magazine ranked the Flathead Beacon the 58th best place to work in the United States, citing the "intense employee pride in the publishing company". The Flathead Beacon police blotter is often cited by Miami Herald columnist Dave Barry on his blog.

== See also ==
- List of newspapers in Montana
