= KRVO =

Coordinates: 48.512°N 114.371°W

- Columbia Falls, Montana; United States
- Broadcast area: Kalispell-Flathead Valley, Montana
- Frequency: 103.1 MHz
- Branding: 103.1 The River

Programming
- Format: Hot adult contemporary

Ownership
- Owner: Rose Communications
- Operator: Bee Broadcasting, Inc.
- Sister stations: KDBR; KJJR; KBCK; KHNK; KBBZ; KWOL-FM

History
- First air date: 2006
- Call sign meaning: "River"

Technical information
- Licensing authority: FCC
- Facility ID: 166025
- Class: C1
- ERP: 8,000 watts
- HAAT: 720 meters (2,360 ft)

Links
- Public license information: Public file; LMS
- Webcast: Listen live
- Website: www.1031theriver.com

KRVO (103.1 FM) is a commercial radio station in Columbia Falls, Montana, broadcasting to the Kalispell-Flathead Valley, Montana area.

KRVO aired an adult album alternative music format branded as “The River”, but evolved into a CHR format while keeping the River moniker. It eventually shifted to more of a hot adult contemporary presentation. It is owned by Rose Communications, and operated by Bee Broadcasting, Inc. All Bee Broadcasting stations are based at 2431 Highway 2 East, Kalispell.
