= KJJR =

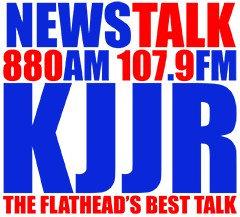
- Whitefish, Montana; United States
- Broadcast area: Kalispell, Montana
- Frequency: 880 kHz
- Branding: News Talk 880 AM 107.9 FM

Programming
- Format: News/talk
- Affiliations: Fox News Radio; Compass Media Networks; Premiere Networks; Radio America; Salem Radio Network; Westwood One

Ownership
- Owner: Bee Broadcasting, Inc.
- Sister stations: KBBZ; KDBR; KBCK; KHNK; KWOL-FM; KRVO

History
- First air date: February 14, 1979

Technical information
- Licensing authority: FCC
- Facility ID: 4578
- Class: B
- Power: 10,000 watts day; 500 watts night
- Transmitter coordinates: 48°23′43.9″N 114°19′14.5″W
- Translator: 107.9 K300DK (Whitefish)

Links
- Public license information: Public file; LMS
- Webcast: streamdb8web.securenetsystems.net/cirruscontent/KJJR
- Website: kjjr.com

KJJR (880 AM, "News Talk 880") is a radio station licensed to serve Whitefish, Montana, United States. Bee Broadcasting, Inc. owns the station and airs in a news/talk format.

== History ==
The station first signed on the air on February 14, 1979, originally broadcasting on the frequency of 1400 kHz as a Class IV local station. It was established by Benny Bee, Sr., who launched the station with a Top 40 and "country gold" format that focused heavily on local personalities and community news. In 1985, the station underwent a major technical upgrade, moving from the crowded 1400 kHz local channel to its current "clear-channel" position at 880 kHz. This move allowed KJJR to increase its daytime power to 10,000 watts, significantly expanding its coverage area across the Flathead Valley and into British Columbia, Canada. Because 880 AM is a clear-channel frequency dominated by WHSQ (formerly WCBS) in New York City, KJJR must reduce its power at night to avoid skywave interference.The station's original call letters were selected by Program Director Dave Shannon as an homage to the legendary KJR in Seattle. The station airs syndicated talk shows hosted from Dan Bongino, Sean Hannity, Mark Levin, Michael Savage, Ben Shapiro, Joe Pags, and Bill Cunningham.

== Tests ==
KJJR has gained a unique reputation among radio hobbyists due to its modern DX tests, which use the station’s high-power daytime signal to reach listeners across the globe during early morning "maintenance" windows.

On January 8, 2022, KJJR conducted a high-profile DX test arranged primarily by Chief Engineer Todd Clark. The test utilized the station's full 10,000-watt daytime power and non-directional pattern at midnight local time, allowing the signal to skip far beyond its normal footprint.

The 2022 test yielded reception reports from across the globe, reaching as far as Finland, where it was logged from a distance of 4,346 miles. Additional "armchair copy" reports came from Sweden and Norway, where DXers utilized massive Beverage antennas nearly 3,000 feet (914 m) in length to isolate the Montana signal. Domestic hobbyists in Alabama and New Mexico reported success, using Software-Defined Radios (SDR) to visually identify the Morse Code IDs on waterfall displays despite the presence of heavy local interference.

All Bee Broadcasting stations are based at 2431 Highway 2 East, Kalispell, Montana. The Federal Communications Commission assigned the station the KJJR call letters. AM 880 is a clear-channel frequency in the United States, and WHSQ in New York City is the dominant and only Class A station.
