= KHNK (AM) =

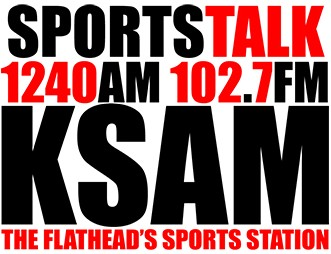
- Whitefish, Montana; United States
- Broadcast area: Flathead County, Montana
- Frequency: 1240 kHz
- Branding: Sports Talk 1240 - 102.7

Programming
- Format: Sports
- Affiliations: Fox Sports Radio

Ownership
- Owner: Bee Broadcasting, Inc.
- Sister stations: KBBZ; KBCK; KDBR; KJJR; KWOL-FM; KRVO

History
- First air date: 2005
- Former call signs: KSAM (2005–2011)

Technical information
- Licensing authority: FCC
- Facility ID: 160441
- Class: C
- Power: 400 watts
- Transmitter coordinates: 48°23′43.9″N 114°19′14.5″W
- Translator: 102.7 K274CY (Whitefish)

Links
- Public license information: Public file; LMS
- Webcast: Listen live

KHNK (1240 kHz, "Sports Talk 1240 - 102.7") is an AM radio station licensed to serve Whitefish, Montana. The station is owned by Bee Broadcasting, Inc. It airs a sports format.

All Bee Broadcasting stations are based at 2431 Highway 2 East, Kalispell.

== History ==
The station was assigned the call sign KSAM by the Federal Communications Commission on November 16, 2005. This callsign had been assigned to an AM radio station in Huntsville, Texas, for nearly 80 years, now known as KHVL. The FM counterpart continues to reside in Huntsville since 1965, as KSAM-FM.

Since 2017, KHNK's AM broadcasts are simulcast on 102.7 FM over translator K274CY.

The KHNK call sign was officially moved to the 1450 kHz frequency in late 2011 following Townsquare Media’s acquisition of the GapWest Broadcasting cluster. During this period, the station was branded as "Honey 101.5," utilizing an FM translator to broadcast a classic country format. This branding served as a niche companion to sister station KYSS-FM, focusing on older country hits and community-centric programming.

In February 2013, Townsquare Media retired the KHNK call letters for the Missoula market and reverted the 1450 AM signal to the KGRZ call sign. This shift marked the end of the "Honey" country era on AM and the beginning of the station's focus on a full-time sports-talk format.
