= Columbia Falls, Montana =

City in Montana, United States

- City
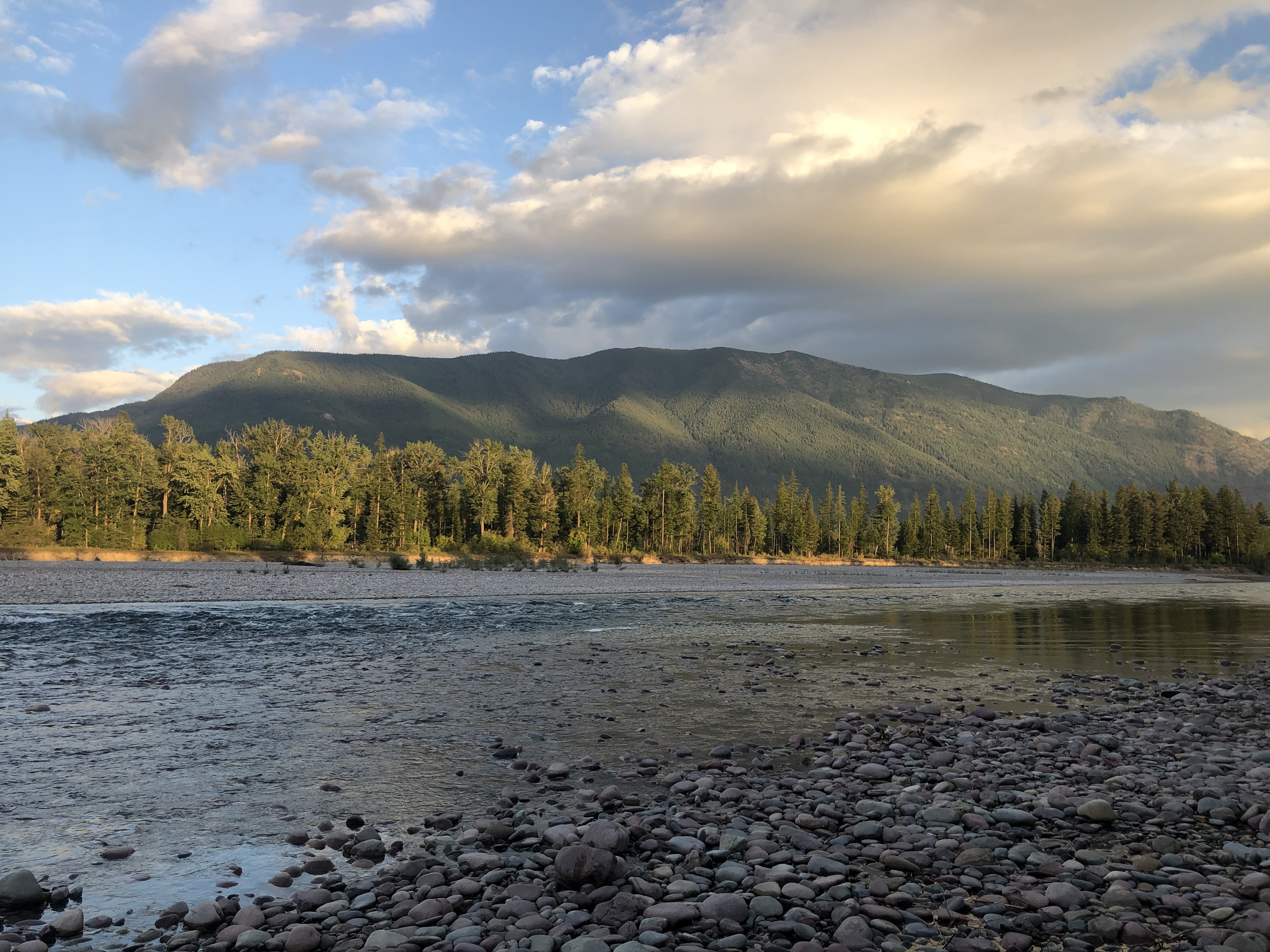
- View of the Flathead River from River's Edge Park.

- Seal

- Location of Columbia Falls, Montana
- Coordinates: 48°22′30″N 114°11′07″W
- Country: United States
- State: Montana
- County: Flathead

Area
  - Total: 2.25 sq mi (5.82 km^{2})
  - Land: 2.24 sq mi (5.81 km^{2})
  - Water: 0.0039 sq mi (0.01 km^{2})
- Elevation: 3,081 ft (939 m)

Population (2020)
  - Total: 5,308
  - Density: 2,366.1/sq mi (913.55/km^{2})
- Time zone: UTC−7 (Mountain (MST))
  - Summer (DST): UTC−6 (MDT)
- ZIP code: 59912
- Area code: 406
- FIPS code: 30-16600
- GNIS feature ID: 2410202
- Website: City website

Columbia Falls is a city along the Flathead River in Flathead County, Montana, United States. The population was 5,308 at the 2020 census.

== History ==
The area that would become the city of Columbia Falls was first settled in 1891, in anticipation of the arrival of the Great Northern Railway. On April 26, 1909, the city of Columbia Falls was officially incorporated.

The first residents requested the name "Columbia" for the U.S. Post Office, but the element "Falls" was ultimately tacked onto the name in order to avoid any confusion with the already-named Columbus, Montana.

Outside the town, and downstream of the power-generating Hungry Horse Dam, the Anaconda Aluminum Co Columbia Falls Reduction Plant, an aluminum production plant was constructed in the mid-1950s.

The Montana Veterans Home in Columbia Falls has served veterans since 1896. Its current housing facility was opened by Montana Governor Forrest H. Anderson at an official dedication ceremony in 1970. An E. M. Viquesney statue of a World War I doughboy was moved to the front of the Veterans' Home in 1972. The statue "originally stood in Kalispell in the Main Street median in front of the Flathead County Courthouse."

== Geography ==
The City of Columbia Falls is located about a mile from the Flathead National Forest boundary, 15 miles from Kalispell and 17 miles from Glacier National Park.

According to the United States Census Bureau, the city has a total area of 2.05 square miles (5.31 km^{2}), all land.

== Demographics ==
Historical population
Census	Pop.	Note	%±
1910	601		—
1920	611		1.7%
1930	637		4.3%
1940	637		0.0%
1950	1,232		93.4%
1960	2,132		73.1%
1970	2,652		24.4%
1980	3,112		17.3%
1990	2,942		−5.5%
2000	3,645		23.9%
2010	4,688		28.6%
2020	5,308		13.2%
U.S. Decennial Census

=== 2020 census ===
As of the 2020 census, Columbia Falls had a population of 5,308. The median age was 38.5 years. 22.7% of residents were under the age of 18 and 19.0% of residents were 65 years of age or older. For every 100 females there were 97.8 males, and for every 100 females age 18 and over there were 95.1 males age 18 and over.

97.6% of residents lived in urban areas, while 2.4% lived in rural areas.

There were 2,173 households in Columbia Falls, of which 29.5% had children under the age of 18 living in them. Of all households, 43.9% were married-couple households, 19.3% were households with a male householder and no spouse or partner present, and 27.9% were households with a female householder and no spouse or partner present. About 30.7% of all households were made up of individuals and 12.4% had someone living alone who was 65 years of age or older.

There were 2,348 housing units, of which 7.5% were vacant. The homeowner vacancy rate was 1.2% and the rental vacancy rate was 5.7%.

Racial composition as of the 2020 census
Race	Number	Percent
White	4,710	88.7%
Black or African American	18	0.3%
American Indian and Alaska Native	68	1.3%
Asian	19	0.4%
Native Hawaiian and Other Pacific Islander	12	0.2%
Some other race	66	1.2%
Two or more races	415	7.8%
Hispanic or Latino (of any race)	186	3.5%

=== 2010 census ===
At the 2010 census there were 4,688 people, 1,863 households, and 1,215 families living in the city. The population density was 2,286.8 inhabitants per square mile (882.9/km^{2}). There were 1,994 housing units at an average density of 972.7 units per square mile (375.6 units/km^{2}). The racial makup of the city was 94.4% White, 0.2% African American, 1.8% Native American, 0.4% Asian, 0.3% from other races, and 2.9% from two or more races. Hispanic or Latino of any race were 2.8%.

Of the 1,863 households 35.0% had children under the age of 18 living with them, 47.9% were married couples living together, 12.9% had a female householder with no husband present, 4.5% had a male householder with no wife present, and 34.8% were non-families. 28.8% of households were one person and 11% were one person aged 65 or older. The average household size was 2.47 and the average family size was 3.02.

The median age was 35.6 years. 26% of residents were under the age of 18; 8.5% were between the ages of 18 and 24; 26.8% were from 25 to 44; 25.3% were from 45 to 64; and 13.2% were 65 or older. The gender makeup of the city was 48.1% male and 51.9% female.

=== 2000 census ===
At the 2000 census there were 3,645 people, 1,400 households, and 966 families living in the city. The population density was 2,402.9 inhabitants per square mile (927.8/km^{2}). There were 1,470 housing units at an average density of 969.1 units per square mile (374.2 units/km^{2}). The racial makeup of the city was 96.27% White, 0.25% African American, 1.23% Native American, 0.49% Asian, 0.08% Pacific Islander, 0.41% from other races, and 1.26% from two or more races. Hispanic or Latino of any race were 1.84%.

Of the 1,400 households 36.3% had children under the age of 18 living with them, 52.0% were married couples living together, 12.1% had a female householder with no husband present, and 31.0% were non-families. 25.7% of households were one person and 11.0% were one person aged 65 or older. The average household size was 2.52 and the average family size was 3.06.

The age distribution was 28.3% under the age of 18, 8.1% from 18 to 24, 28.6% from 25 to 44, 21.5% from 45 to 64, and 13.4% 65 or older. The median age was 36 years. For every 100 females there were 99.2 males. For every 100 females age 18 and over, there were 97.4 males.

The median household income was $31,128 and the median family income was $40,794. Males had a median income of $32,109 versus $20,023 for females. The per capita income for the city was $14,355. About 12.5% of families and 17.1% of the population were below the poverty line, including 25.8% of those under age 18 and 4.0% of those age 65 or over.

== Arts and culture ==
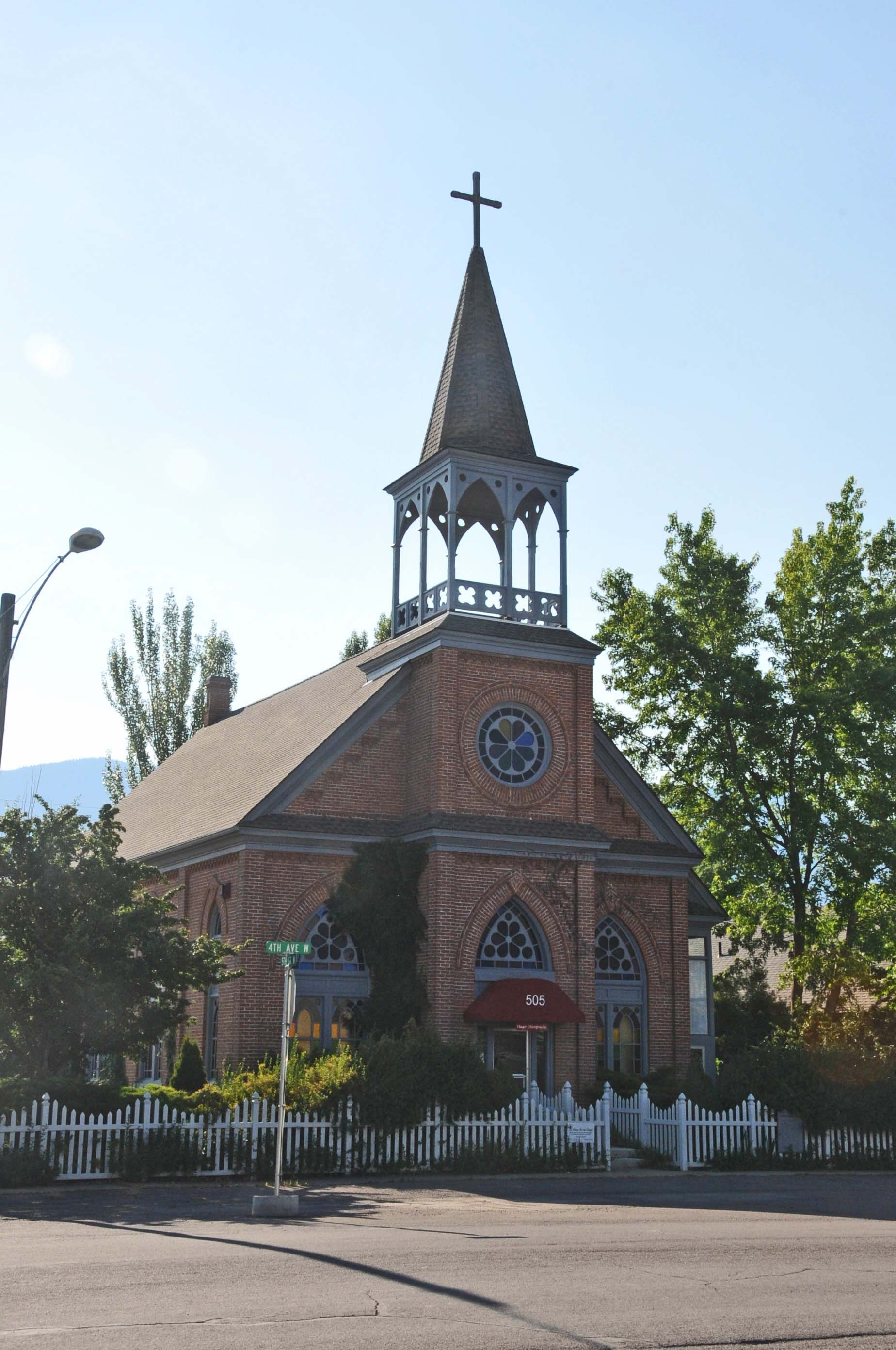
St. Richard's Church in Columbia Falls

Heritage Days is an annual celebration of the town's history and heritage. It occurs on the last weekend of July. Activities include the Boogie to the Bank fun run, Wildcat Endowment Auction, a parade and carnival, a basketball tournament, a barn dance, a car show, and a rodeo.

Night of Lights Parade is an annual December holiday parade.

Columbia Falls has a public library, a branch of the Flathead County Library.

Columbia Falls Community Market is a farmers market held weekly every Thursday from 5pm - 8pm from the second Thursday in May until the last Thursday in September. The market offers live music, food trucks, local produce, handmade arts and crafts, and locally brewed beer.

== Parks and recreation ==
River's Edge Park has over 900 ft (270 m) of river frontage on Flathead River and occupies 28 acres (11 ha). The park has paved walking trails, open meadows, bathroom facilities, a family fly fishing pond, and a disc golf course.

Pinewood Park Aquatic Center is a public swimming facility located on 4th Ave West. The park also has a basketball court, children's play area, picnic tables, and swings.

The city maintains several other small neighborhood parks, baseball fields, and a soccer field.

== Government ==
The government system of Columbia Falls consists of a City Council with six councilmen and a mayor, elected to four-year terms.

In June 2020, Columbia Falls voters elected to implement a 3% resort tax on all luxury items and services within city limits, more than 50% of the tax revenue is slated to go toward public safety funding.

== Education ==
Schools in Columbia Falls School District Six include Columbia Falls High School, Columbia Falls Junior High School, Glacier Gateway Elementary School, and Ruder Elementary School. School District Six has an approximately 2,400 students. In 2019 voters approved a $37 million school bond which will fund a new Glacier Gateway Elementary School, a 25,000 square foot addition to the Ruder Elementary School, a security upgrade for the Junior High School, and new multi-use sports fields.

Columbia Falls High School's mascot is the Wildcats.

The area is served by the ImagineIF library, which also has branches in Bigfork, Kalispell, and Marion.

== Transportation ==
U.S. Highway 2 runs through Columbia Falls. The North Fork Road (S-486) begins at the junction to U.S. Highway 2 in Columbia Falls and runs to the Canadian border.

Commercial airline service is offered at Glacier Park International Airport located approximately 8 miles south of Columbia Falls.

The Columbia Falls area is served by Amtrak's Chicago-Portland/Seattle Empire Builder, with stops located nearby in Whitefish and West Glacier.

== Media ==
Columbia Falls is served by Hungry Horse News. The city is also part of the Missoula media market, which covers a seven-county area of northwestern Montana.

KBCK 95.9 FM, (Outlaw Country) and KRVO 103.1 FM are commercial radio stations located in Columbia Falls, broadcasting to the Kalispell-Flathead Valley, Montana, area. KBCK airs a country music format and KRVO airs an adult alternative format.

== Notable people ==
- Douglas Cordier, educator and politician
- Paul Grilley, yoga teacher
- Anthony Kurta, retired US Navy Admiral
- Braxton Mitchell, member of the Montana House of Representatives
- Matt Regier, politician and businessman
- Glenn Roush, politician
- Mel Ruder, Pulitzer Prize winner and publisher emeritus of The Hungry Horse News
- Gloria Jean Siebrecht, paleontologist

== Points of interest ==
- St. Richard's Church. Built in 1891 and listed on the National Register of Historic Places.
- Soldier's Home Historic District. Built in 1895 the facility houses and provides subsistence to veterans and their spouses.
- Flathead River Bridge (also known as the Red Bridge)

== See also ==
- List of cities and towns in Montana
