= Flathead Valley =

Valley in Montana, United States

Coordinates: 48°N 114°W

The Flathead Valley is a region located in the northwestern part of the U.S. state of Montana.

It includes parts of Flathead County and Lake County. Notable communities include Kalispell, Bigfork, Whitefish, Columbia Falls, Polson, Ronan, and St. Ignatius. The geography of the Flathead roughly corresponds to the valley where Flathead Lake is located, with two distinct ends – the northern (or upper) Flathead Valley and the southern (lower) Flathead Valley.

In addition to Flathead and Whitefish lakes, the area's proximity to attractions such as Glacier National Park, Whitefish Mountain Resort, and Blacktail Mountain Ski Area have made the area a major summer and winter resort destination. Many outdoor activities can be pursued, including hiking, backpacking, boating, rafting, canoeing, skiing, hunting, and fly fishing.

The lower Flathead Valley and the southern half of Flathead Lake are within the Flathead Indian Reservation, and is home to the historic St. Ignatius Mission, founded in 1854.

As of July 2023, population growth was outstripping housing supply.

== See also ==
- American Redoubt
