= Kalispell, Montana =

City in Montana, United States

- City
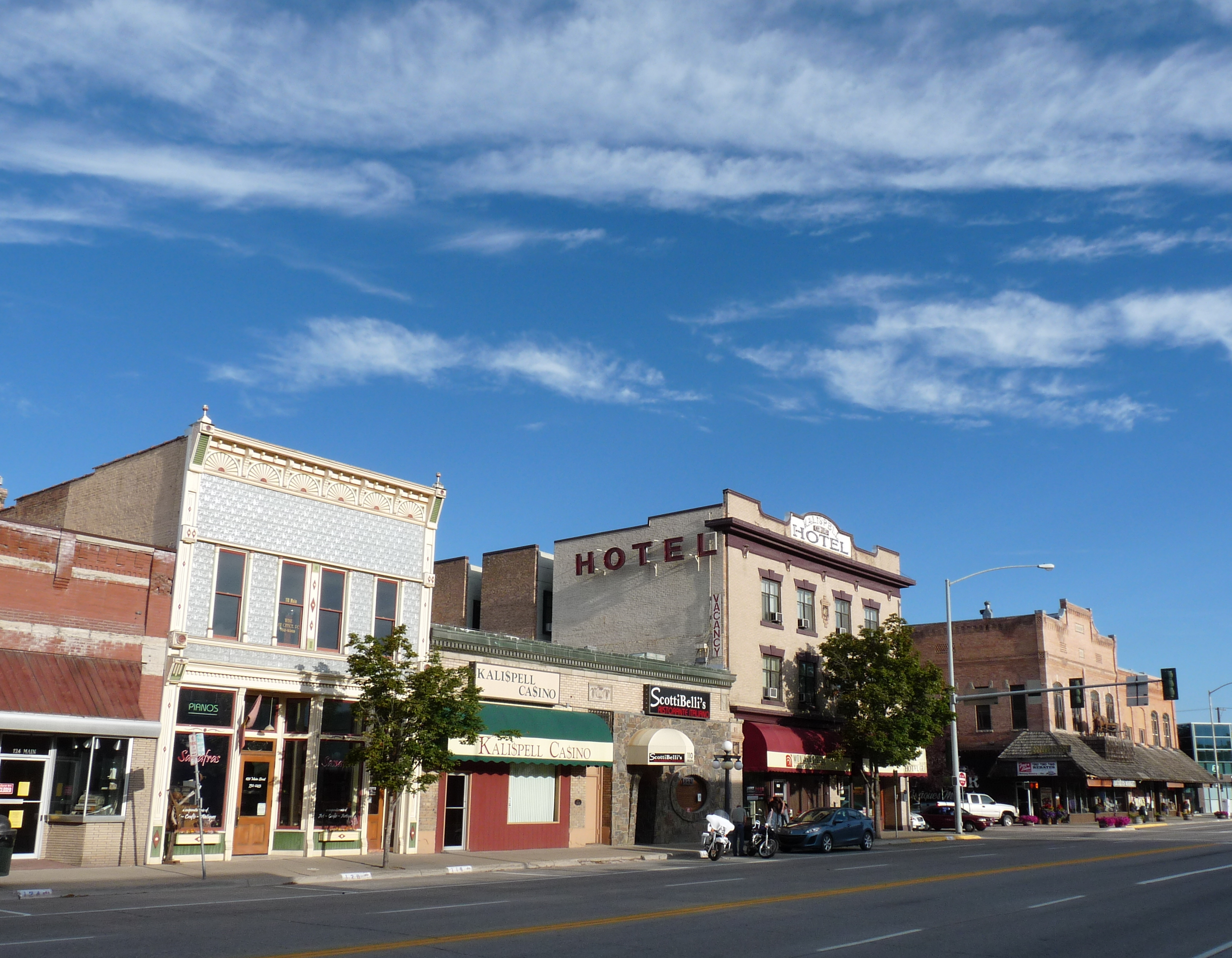
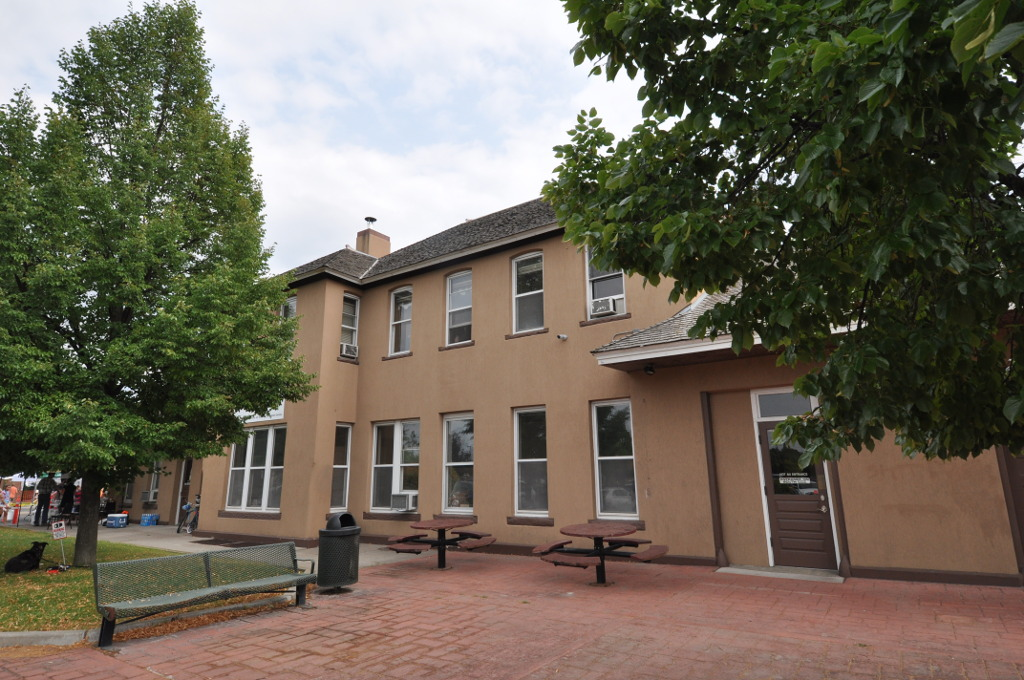
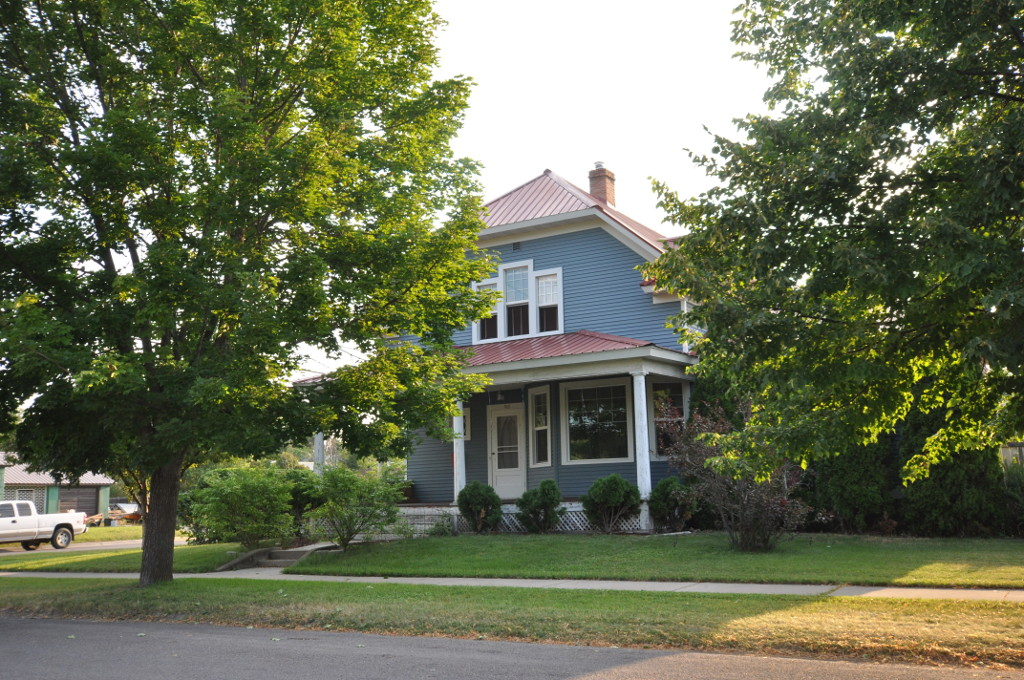
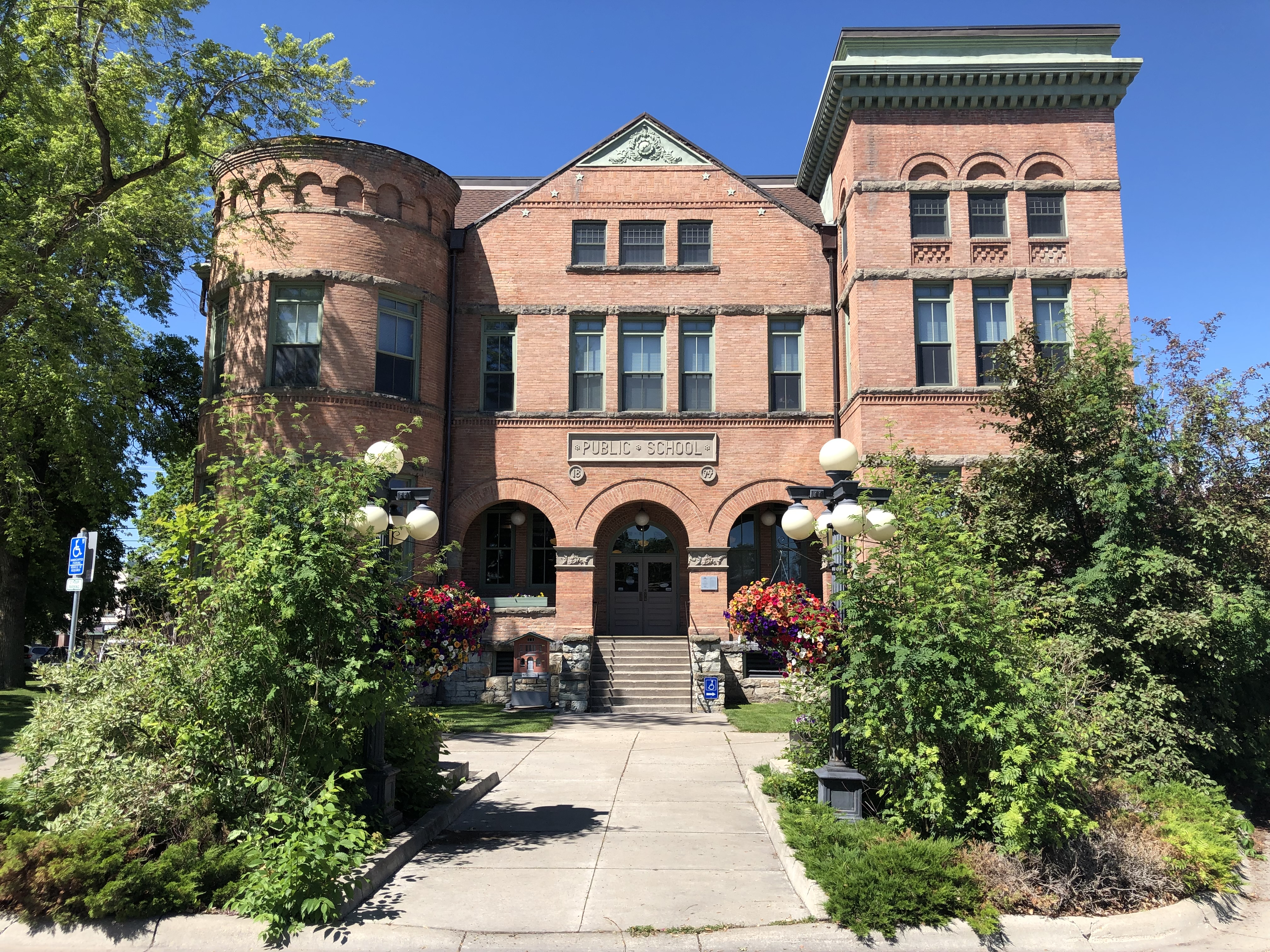
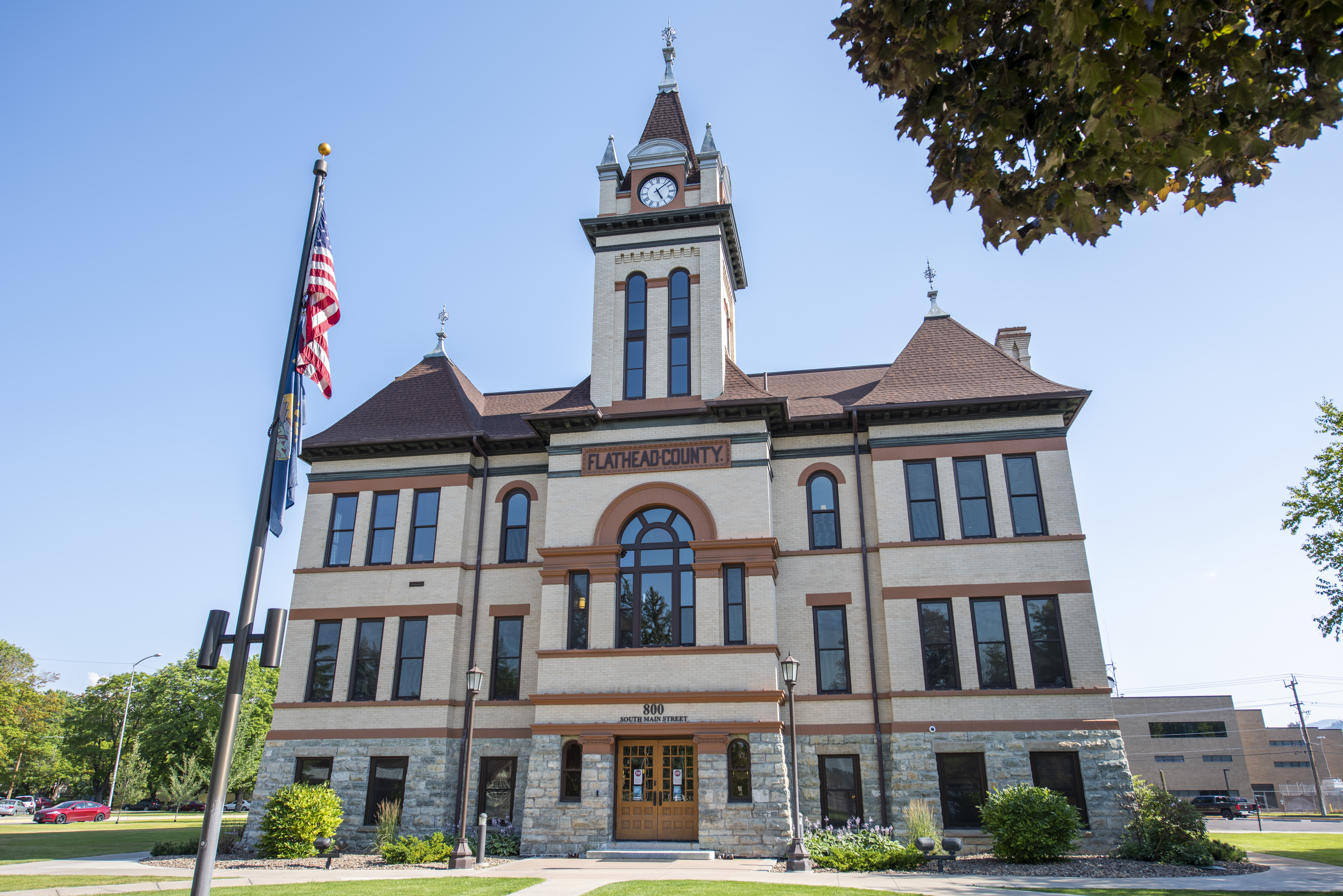
- Downtown Kalispell Great Northern Railway Depot Woll House Northwest Montana History Museum Flathead County Courthouse

- Logo

- Location of Kalispell within Flathead County

- Location in the United States
- Coordinates: 48°14′02″N 114°20′20″W
- Country: United States
- State: Montana
- County: Flathead

Government
  - Mayor: Ryan Hunter

Area
  - City: 12.64 sq mi (32.74 km^{2})
  - Land: 12.56 sq mi (32.52 km^{2})
  - Water: 0.085 sq mi (0.22 km^{2})
- Elevation: 3,084 ft (940 m)

Population (2020)
  - City: 24,558
  - Estimate: 31,296
  - Density: 1,956/sq mi (755.2/km^{2})
  - Metro: 104,357
- Time zone: UTC−7 (Mountain (MST))
  - Summer (DST): UTC−6 (MDT)
- ZIP Codes: 59901–59904
- Area code: 406
- FIPS code: 30-40075
- GNIS feature ID: 2410161
- Website: www.kalispell.com

Kalispell (/ˈkælɪˌspɛl, ˌkælɪˈspɛl/) is a city in and the county seat of Flathead County, Montana, United States. The 2020 census put Kalispell's population at 24,558. The latest estimates put the population at 31,296. Among cities in Montana, it is the 8th largest by area, 7th most populous, and 8th fastest growing from 2010 to 2020. In Montana's northwest region, it is the largest city and the commercial center of the Kalispell Micropolitan Statistical Area. The name Kalispell is a Salish word meaning "flat land above the lake".

== History ==
=== Early founding ===
The first European settler to explore the Flathead Valley was likely surveyor Peter Fidler of the Hudson's Bay Company in the 18th century. From 1870, permanent settlement and the introduction of livestock brought permanent changes, as did the near-eradication of local bison populations.

In 1884, a short-lived town called Ashley was founded where Kalispell was later built. Three years later, nearby Demersville was founded. Demersville quickly grew to be the largest town in the area, but when the Great Northern Railroad bypassed the town it was abandoned just as quickly, with people moving the short distance to the new town of Kalispell.

=== Railroad expansion and incorporation ===
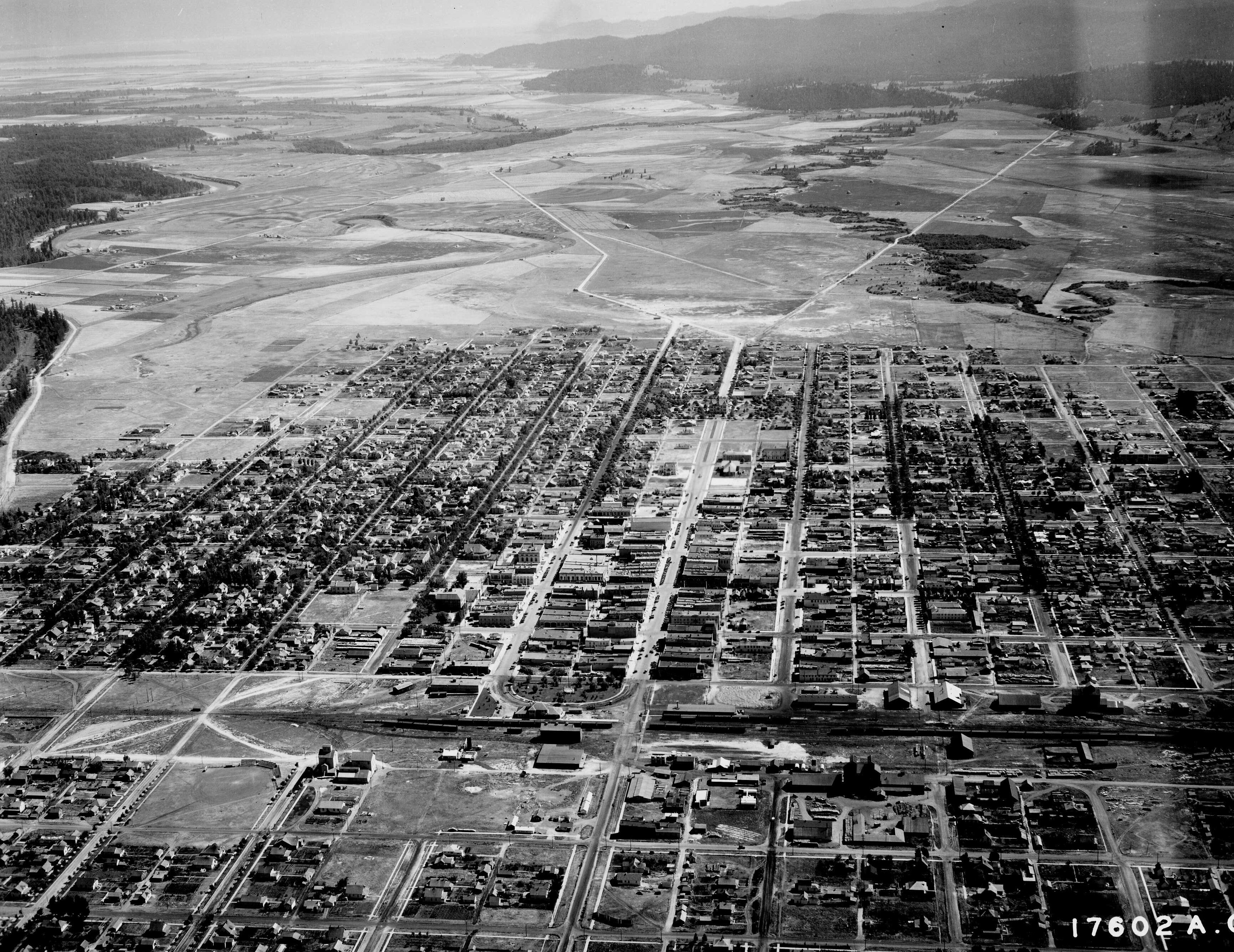
Aerial view of Kalispell, 1925

As the Great Northern Railroad built its continent-spanning railroad line in the 19th century, a need for a Divisional point in the Flathead Valley was identified. Using his own capital, Charles Edward Conrad, a businessman and banker from Fort Benton, Montana, formed the Kalispell Townsite Company with three other men, all from Great Northern board of directors. The town took its name from the local native tribe, adding an extra "L". "Kalispell" is a Salish word meaning "flat land above the lake".

The townsite was quickly platted, and lots began selling by the spring of 1891. Kalispell was incorporated as a city in 1892, and Conrad built a large mansion there in 1895. Since then, the city has continued to grow, reaching 19,927 in 2010. This growth persisted despite the railroad being rerouted from its original route over Haskell Pass, via Kalispell and Marion, Montana, to a more circuitous but flatter route via Whitefish and Eureka already in 1904.

=== Growth and formation of county seat ===
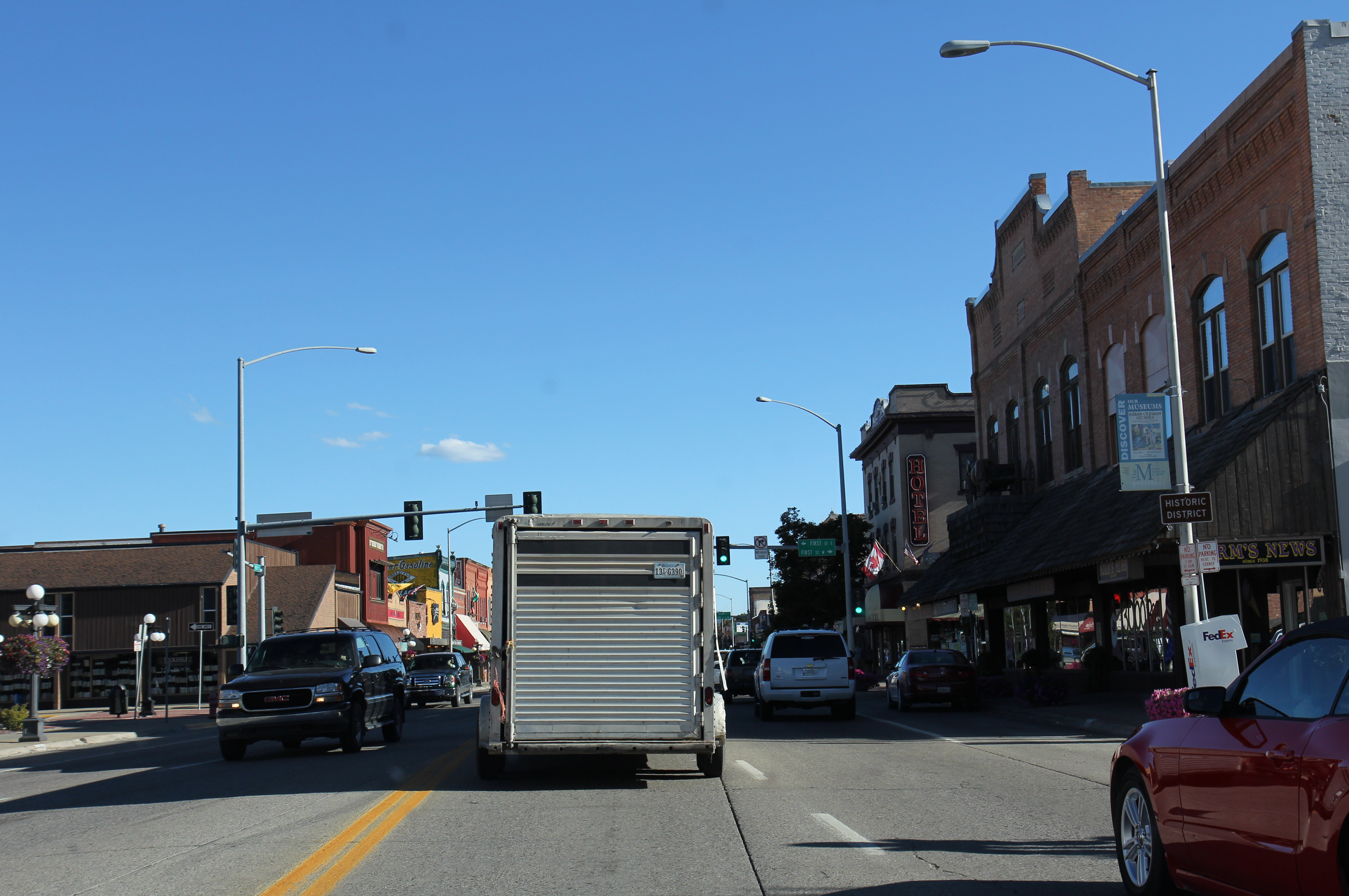
Main Street, Kalispell

As the largest city in northwest Montana, Kalispell serves as the county seat and commercial center of Flathead County. The city is considered a secondary trade center with a trade area of approximately 130,000. The city is home to Logan Health Medical Center, which has a 150-bed hospital facility. The railroad history through Kalispell ended in 2018 when the city purchased and tore up the long abandoned track through the city. The city of Kalispell removed the remaining downtown trackage, relocating the railroad to Glacier Rail Park, a new industrial park just north of town and abandoning 2.4 miles (3.9 km) of the original route.

=== Homeless population ===
In 2023, Kalispell became nationally known for its combative actions against the homeless population in the town. The city government had previously begun passing ordinances in 2022 that punished anyone that helped homeless people in Kalispell, such as giving out food, supplies, or money. They also shut off water and electricity in the local park so it could not be utilized by homeless in the area. The county commissioners also released an open letter calling on residents to actively unite against the homeless, which resulted in groups of younger people violently assaulting homeless in the town. The New York Times published an article in January 2024 about the homeless population of Kalispell, noting that many were residents who had recently undergone financial trouble that led to them losing their homes, such as having a divorce.

The city council revoked the permit of the town's homeless shelter in September 2024, forcing the closure of its warming center in October 2024, putting much of the homeless population at risk of death during winter months as noted by the shelter's director. The shelter filed a lawsuit that same month against the city, arguing that the city council had failed to present any violation of local law or ordinances by the shelter that would support the revocation of the permit. The federal judge overseeing the court case approved a preliminary injunction in November 2024 that allowed the warming center to remain open for the duration of the case.

== Geography and climate ==
Climate chart for Kalispell

According to the United States Census Bureau, the city has an area of 11.73 square miles (30.38 km^{2}), of which 11.64 square miles (30.15 km^{2}) is land and 0.09 square miles (0.23 km^{2}) is water.

Kalispell is 7 miles (11 km) north of Flathead Lake, the largest natural freshwater lake in the western U.S. by surface area.

The city has a warm-summer humid continental climate (Köppen: Dfb), with long, cold, and moderately snowy winters, hot and dry summers, and short springs and autumns. Snow usually occurs from late October/early November to March.

Climate data for Kalispell, Montana (Glacier Park International Airport), 1991–2020 normals, extremes 1896–present
Month	Jan	Feb	Mar	Apr	May	Jun	Jul	Aug	Sep	Oct	Nov	Dec	Year
Record high °F (°C)	56 (13)	64 (18)	73 (23)	85 (29)	95 (35)	102 (39)	104 (40)	105 (41)	99 (37)	86 (30)	69 (21)	62 (17)	105 (41)
Mean maximum °F (°C)	45.0 (7.2)	48.3 (9.1)	60.6 (15.9)	72.3 (22.4)	82.3 (27.9)	86.9 (30.5)	94.2 (34.6)	94.5 (34.7)	86.3 (30.2)	72.4 (22.4)	55.7 (13.2)	45.7 (7.6)	96.2 (35.7)
Mean daily maximum °F (°C)	31.0 (−0.6)	35.5 (1.9)	45.1 (7.3)	55.0 (12.8)	65.1 (18.4)	71.2 (21.8)	82.2 (27.9)	81.7 (27.6)	70.4 (21.3)	54.1 (12.3)	39.4 (4.1)	31.0 (−0.6)	55.1 (12.8)
Daily mean °F (°C)	23.7 (−4.6)	26.8 (−2.9)	34.5 (1.4)	42.7 (5.9)	51.6 (10.9)	57.6 (14.2)	64.9 (18.3)	63.7 (17.6)	54.3 (12.4)	41.6 (5.3)	31.4 (−0.3)	24.1 (−4.4)	43.1 (6.2)
Mean daily minimum °F (°C)	16.3 (−8.7)	18.1 (−7.7)	24.0 (−4.4)	30.5 (−0.8)	38.1 (3.4)	44.0 (6.7)	47.6 (8.7)	45.7 (7.6)	38.3 (3.5)	29.1 (−1.6)	23.5 (−4.7)	17.2 (−8.2)	31.0 (−0.6)
Mean minimum °F (°C)	−8.2 (−22.3)	−1.6 (−18.7)	7.7 (−13.5)	19.8 (−6.8)	25.6 (−3.6)	33.0 (0.6)	37.1 (2.8)	34.9 (1.6)	27.1 (−2.7)	14.5 (−9.7)	6.7 (−14.1)	−3.5 (−19.7)	−15.1 (−26.2)
Record low °F (°C)	−38 (−39)	−36 (−38)	−29 (−34)	−5 (−21)	17 (−8)	26 (−3)	30 (−1)	30 (−1)	7 (−14)	−4 (−20)	−28 (−33)	−35 (−37)	−38 (−39)
Average precipitation inches (mm)	1.40 (36)	0.96 (24)	1.11 (28)	1.34 (34)	1.84 (47)	2.84 (72)	1.14 (29)	0.76 (19)	1.17 (30)	1.35 (34)	1.35 (34)	1.50 (38)	16.76 (426)
Average snowfall inches (cm)	13.9 (35)	8.4 (21)	5.4 (14)	1.2 (3.0)	0.2 (0.51)	0.3 (0.76)	0.0 (0.0)	0.0 (0.0)	0.0 (0.0)	1.1 (2.8)	8.0 (20)	15.9 (40)	54.4 (138)
Average extreme snow depth inches (cm)	12.3 (31)	9.1 (23)	7.8 (20)	0.4 (1.0)	0.0 (0.0)	0.0 (0.0)	0.0 (0.0)	0.0 (0.0)	0.0 (0.0)	0.4 (1.0)	4.2 (11)	11.1 (28)	14.8 (38)
Average precipitation days (≥ 0.01 in)	14.2	11.4	12.4	11.3	12.0	12.7	6.7	6.4	7.6	10.5	12.2	14.3	131.7
Average snowy days (≥ 0.1 in)	10.3	8.0	4.0	1.6	0.2	0.1	0.0	0.0	0.0	0.9	5.5	10.8	41.4
Average relative humidity (%)	77.6	75.8	69.2	60.2	60.6	62.6	57.5	57.8	65.0	71.9	78.5	81.1	68.2
Average dew point °F (°C)	15.4 (−9.2)	19.2 (−7.1)	23.5 (−4.7)	28.6 (−1.9)	36.7 (2.6)	44.2 (6.8)	47.1 (8.4)	45.9 (7.7)	39.6 (4.2)	31.8 (−0.1)	25.0 (−3.9)	18.0 (−7.8)	31.3 (−0.4)
Source 1: NOAA (relative humidity and dew point 1961–1990)
Source 2: National Weather Service

== Demographics ==
Historical population
Census	Pop.	Note	%±
1890	1,000		—
1900	2,526		152.6%
1910	5,549		119.7%
1920	5,147		−7.2%
1930	6,094		18.4%
1940	8,425		38.3%
1950	9,737		15.6%
1960	10,151		4.3%
1970	10,526		3.7%
1980	10,648		1.2%
1990	11,917		11.9%
2000	14,223		19.4%
2010	19,927		40.1%
2020	24,558		23.2%
source: U.S. Decennial Census: 2020

=== 2020 census ===
As of the 2020 census, Kalispell had a population of 24,558. The median age was 37.7 years. 23.0% of residents were under the age of 18 and 19.6% of residents were 65 years of age or older. For every 100 females there were 89.9 males, and for every 100 females age 18 and over there were 85.4 males age 18 and over.

97.9% of residents lived in urban areas, while 2.1% lived in rural areas.

There were 10,297 households in Kalispell, of which 29.2% had children under the age of 18 living in them. Of all households, 41.6% were married-couple households, 19.2% were households with a male householder and no spouse or partner present, and 32.0% were households with a female householder and no spouse or partner present. About 34.1% of all households were made up of individuals and 15.8% had someone living alone who was 65 years of age or older.

There were 10,894 housing units, of which 5.5% were vacant. The homeowner vacancy rate was 1.6% and the rental vacancy rate was 4.3%.

Racial composition as of the 2020 census
Race	Number	Percent
White	21,824	88.9%
Black or African American	107	0.4%
American Indian and Alaska Native	305	1.2%
Asian	267	1.1%
Native Hawaiian and Other Pacific Islander	23	0.1%
Some other race	284	1.2%
Two or more races	1,748	7.1%
Hispanic or Latino (of any race)	997	4.1%

=== 2010 census ===
As of the census of 2010, there were 19,927 people, 8,638 households, and 4,944 families living in the city. The population density was 1,711.9 inhabitants per square mile (661.0/km^{2}). There were 9,379 housing units at an average density of 805.8 per square mile (311.1/km^{2}). The racial makeup of the city was 94.2% White, 0.2% African American, 1.3% Native American, 1.0% Asian, 0.1% Pacific Islander, 0.6% from other races, and 2.6% from two or more races. Hispanic or Latino of any race were 2.9% of the population.

Of the 8,638 households, 30.8% had children under the age of 18, 40.4% were married couples living together, 12.0% had a female family head with no husband present, 4.8% had a male family head with no wife present, and 42.8% were not classified as family units. 35.7% of all households were made up of individuals, and 14.4% were individuals 65 years old or older. The average household size was 2.26, and the average family size was 2.94.

The median age in the city was 34.5 years. A total of 25.1% of residents were under 18; 9.5% were between the ages of 18 and 24; 27.2% were between the ages of 25 and 44; 22.7% were between the ages 45 and 64, and 14.4% were 65 years of age or older. The gender makeup of the city was 47.3% male and 52.7% female.

=== 2000 census ===
As of the census of 2000, there were 14,223 people, 6,142 households, and 3,494 families living in the city. The population density was 2,605.7 inhabitants per square mile (1,006.1/km^{2}). There were 6,532 housing units at an average density of 1,196.7 per square mile (462.0/km^{2}). The racial makeup of the city was 95.84% White, 0.28% African American, 1.22% Native American, 0.56% Asian, 0.04% Pacific Islander, 0.39% from other races, and 1.66% from two or more races. Hispanic or Latino of any race were 1.55% of the population. 21.7% were of German, 12.0% Irish, 11.3% Norwegian, 10.7% English and 6.6% United States or American ancestry.

There were 6,142 households, out of which 28.9% had children under the age of 18 living with them, 42.0% were married couples living together, 11.2% had a female householder with no husband present, and 43.1% were non-families. 36.8% of all households were made up of individuals, and 15.5% had someone living alone who was 65 years of age or older. The average household size was 2.209, and the average family size was 2.92.

In the city, the population's age distribution shows 24.0% under the age of 18, 10.0% from 18 to 24, 26.8% from 25 to 44, 20.9% from 45 to 64, and 18.3% 65 years of age or older. The median age was 38 years. For every 100 females, there were 87.7 males. For every 100 females age 18 and over, there were 82.1 males.

The median income for a household in the city was $28,567, and the median income for a family was $36,554. Males had a median income of $29,431 versus $20,122 for females. The per capita income for the city was $16,224. About 10.1% of families and 15.9% of the population were below the poverty line, including 17.1% of those under age 18 and 13.0% of those age 65 or over.

== Economy ==
=== Top employers ===
According to the City's 2019 Comprehensive Annual Financial Report for the fiscal year ending June 30, 2019, the top employers in the city are:

Rank	Employer	Number of Employees
1	Logan Health Medical Center	1,000+
2	Weyerhaeuser (formerly Plum Creek Manufacturing) 8 7	500 to 999
3	Health Center Northwest	250 to 499
4	Applied Materials/Semitool	250 to 499
5	TeleTech	250 to 499
6	Glacier Bank	250 to 499
7	Whitefish Mountain Resort	250 to 499
8	Super 1 Foods	250 to 499
9	Walmart	250 to 499
10	Logan Health - Whitefish	250 to 499

Kalispell is home to the headquarters of the Montana Rifle Company. As of July 2014, one of Montana's last mint farms, growing peppermint and spearmint, is near Kalispell.

== Arts and culture ==
Nestled in the Flathead valley, Kalispell is 31 miles (50 km) from Glacier National Park and 22 miles (35 km) from Hungry Horse Dam. Skiers have access to Whitefish Mountain Resort on Big Mountain and Blacktail Mountain Ski Area, each 17 miles (27 km) away. Flathead Lake, the largest freshwater lake west of the Mississippi river, is 7 miles (11 km) away. Buffalo Hill Golf Club, designed by Robert Muir Graves, serves golfers in the region.

Kalispell has a public library, a branch of the Flathead County Library.

== Education ==
Kalispell Public Schools has two components: Kalispell Elementary School District and Flathead High School District. Whitefish Public Schools has two components: Whitefish Elementary School District and Whitefish High School District.

Most of Kalispell is in Kalispell Elementary School District, while a portion is in West Valley Elementary School District, and a very small piece is in Whitefish Elementary School District. Almost all of Kalispell is in Flathead High School District, while a small piece is in Whitefish High School District. There are two high schools in Kalispell (both of the Flathead district), Flathead High School and Glacier High School.

Flathead Valley Community College is a tertiary institution.

The tribal schools nearby offer classes in the Kalispel–Spokane–Flathead language, a language nest, and intensive language training for adults. There is a Salish language school and training center in nearby Arlee, Montana.

== Media ==
Kalispell is one of Montana's largest media markets. It is the state's second-largest over-the-air radio market, after Billings.

AM radio

- KGEZ 600
- KERR 750
- KJJR 880
- KOFI 1180
- KHNK 1240
- KQDE 1340

FM radio

- KLKM 88.7
- KUKL-FM 90.1
- KFLF 91.3
- KQRK 92.3
- KBCK 95.9
- KALS 97.1
- KBBZ 98.5
- KKMT 99.7
- KIBG 100.7
- KXZI-LP 101.9
- KANB-LP 102.3
- KRVO 103.1
- KZMN 103.9
- KWOL-FM 105.1
- KDBR 106.3

Television

- KCFW-TV 9 (NBC)
- KAJJ-CD 18 (CBS)
- KTMF-LD 42 (ABC, with Fox/MyNetworkTV on DT2)
- KUKL-TV 46 (PBS)

Newspapers

- Daily Inter Lake, printed daily and online
- Flathead Beacon, online only
- Montana Senior News, printed in Kalispell, distributed statewide

== Infrastructure ==
=== Transportation ===
Kalispell is at the intersection of U.S. Routes 2 and 93. Commercial air service is offered at Glacier Park International Airport, approximately 8 miles (13 km) northeast of Kalispell off US 2 between Kalispell and Columbia Falls.

Kalispell City Airport, in the southern part of the city, offers general aviation service.

Amtrak's Empire Builder service between Chicago and either Seattle, or Portland, is available in Whitefish, approximately 15 miles (24 km) north.

Eagle Transit, an agency of Flathead County, offers local transit service within and connecting Kalispell, Columbia Falls and Whitefish, as well as paratransit demand-responsive service. This service is extremely limited, however, and commuting in Flathead County is very car-dependent.

== Notable people ==
- Ruth Anderson, composer
- James E. Atwater, retired chemist and geophysicist
- Chuck Baldwin, Constitution Party presidential candidate
- Brad Bird, Academy Award–winning director of animated films and television programs
- Asta Bowen, author
- Robert Bray, film and television actor
- Jaime Clarke, novelist and editor
- John Corapi, a former Catholic priest and speaker
- Shane Bitney Crone, activist, filmmaker, writer, speaker for LGBT rights
- William Cumming, 20th-century artist and founder of Northwest School
- Rick Dennison, offensive coordinator of NFL's Buffalo Bills, Denver Broncos
- John Edward Erickson, governor of Montana
- George Everett, American accountant, real estate broker, and politician
- John Fuller, politician
- Frank Garner, former chief of police, security consultant, and politician
- Lily Gladstone, actress
- Flip Gordon, professional wrestler
- Robin Lee Graham, circumnavigated the world at age 16
- Frank Hagel, painter and sculptor
- Tanner Hall, professional skier, Winter X-Games gold medalist in Slope-Style, Big Air and half-pipe
- T. J. Hileman, photographer of Glacier National Park
- Lex Hilliard, NFL player, New York Jets fullback
- Dorothy M. Johnson, noted author of Western fiction
- Tim Koleto, Olympic figure skater
- Brad Ludden, professional kayaker
- Sam McCullum, former NFL player
- Dylan McFarland, former Buffalo Bills offensive lineman
- Braxton Mitchell, politician
- Andrew J. Moonen, former employee of Blackwater USA accused of murder in Iraq
- Mary Oppen, activist, photographer, wife of George Oppen
- Brock Osweiler, quarterback for Denver Broncos, Houston Texans, Cleveland Browns, and Miami Dolphins
- Daniel Parker, sculptor and painter
- Charlotte Pendragon, magician/entertainer
- Eugene H. Peterson, author of The Message, a contemporary rendition of the Bible
- Shadi Petosky, author and television producer
- Ace Powell, painter and sculptor
- Margaret Qualley, actress
- Keith Regier, educator, businessman and politician
- Matt Regier, businessman and politician
- Mike Reilly, NFL quarterback, CFL quarterback, BC Lions, Edmonton Eskimos
- Stewart Rhodes
- Alice Ritzman, former LPGA golf professional
- Monsignor Alexander King Sample, Roman Catholic Archbishop of Portland, Oregon
- Robert Burns Smith, governor of Montana
- Thatcher Szalay, former Seattle Seahawks offensive lineman
- Melanie Rae Thon, award-winning author
- Misty Upham (1982–2014), actress
- The von Trapps, singers
- Randy Weaver, survivalist, involved in Ruby Ridge standoff
- Michelle Williams, actress

== In popular culture ==
Heaven's Gate (1980), an American western epic, was filmed in and around Kalispell.
