= KCAP (1340 AM) =

- Helena, Montana; United States
- Frequency: 1340 kHz

Programming
- Format: News/talk

Ownership
- Owner: Cherry Creek Radio; (CCR-Helena IV, LLC)
- Sister stations: KBLL; KBLL-FM; KBMI-FM; KHGC; KZMT

History
- First air date: October 1949
- Last air date: October 30, 2014
- Former call signs: KENA (1948–1949); KFDW (1949–1952)

Technical information
- Facility ID: 50355
- Class: C
- Power: 1,000 watts (unlimited)
- Transmitter coordinates: 46°36′43″N 112°3′13″W

KCAP (1340 AM) was a radio station licensed to serve Helena, Montana. The station was owned by Cherry Creek Radio and licensed to CCR-Helena IV, LLC. It aired a news/talk format.

== History ==
The station was initially issued the call letters KENA, which were changed to KFDW on January 19, 1949. It went on the air in October 1949. The station was assigned the KCAP call letters by the Federal Communications Commission (FCC) on January 1, 1952.

In August 2000, a deal was reached for KCAP to be acquired by Commonwealth Communications LLC from STARadio Corp. as part of a 9 station deal with a total reported sale price of $7.5 million.

In October 2003, a deal was reached for KCAP to be acquired by Cherry Creek Radio from Commonwealth Communications LLC as part of a 24 station deal with a total reported sale price of $41 million.

On October 30, 2014, KCAP's license was surrendered by Cherry Creek Radio to the FCC, who subsequently cancelled it; the station's programming moved that November to KMTX (950 AM), which Cherry Creek Radio was in the process of acquiring from Montana Radio Company. The KCAP call sign was then transferred to KMTX.
