= KCAP (disambiguation) =

KCAP is a radio station (950 AM) licensed to Helena, Montana, United States.

KCAP may also refer to:

- KCAP (1340 AM), a former radio station (1340 AM) licensed to Helena, Montana, which operated from 1949 to 2014
- KZMT, a radio station (101.1 FM) licensed to Helena, Montana, United States, which used the call sign KCAP-FM from 1975 to 1984
