= KBLL (AM) =

- Helena, Montana; United States
- Frequency: 1240 kHz
- Branding: Newstalk 1240

Programming
- Format: News/talk

Ownership
- Owner: Cherry Creek Radio; (CCR-Helena IV, LLC)
- Sister stations: KBLL-FM; KCAP; KBMI-FM; KHGC; KZMT

History
- First air date: 1937
- Last air date: November 4, 2014
- Former call signs: KPFA (1937–1946); KXLJ (1946–1961)

Technical information
- Facility ID: 27515
- Class: C
- Power: 1,000 watts
- Transmitter coordinates: 46°36′42.8″N 112°3′16″W

KBLL (1240 AM, "Newstalk 1240") was a radio station licensed to serve Helena, Montana. The station was owned by Cherry Creek Radio. It aired a news/talk format.

Notable syndicated programming on the station included shows hosted by Rush Limbaugh, Michael Medved, and Jerry Doyle. The station was also one of the most active in Montana for local sports broadcasting, featuring Capital high school football and basketball, plus American Legion baseball. The sports "voice" and news director was former Chicago White Sox, Bears, and Blackhawk broadcaster Jay Scott. The station was also a leader in web-streaming its sports broadcasts. In 2008, Jay Scott was presented the "Montana Newscast of the Year" award by the Montana Broadcasters Association, after two runner-up awards the previous two years. He was the runner-up for "Montana Sportscaster of the Year" in 2009, 2010, 2011, 2012, 2013, 2014, 2015, and 2016.

== History ==
The station began broadcasting in 1937 as KPFA. On November 4, 1946, the call letters were changed to KXLJ, and on March 29, 1961, were changed again to KBLL.

In April 2004, a deal was reached for KBLL to be acquired by Cherry Creek Radio from Holter Broadcasting Corp. (Jan Holter-Lambert, president) as part of a 2-station deal with a total reported sale price of $2.8 million. KBLL went ceased broadcasting on November 4, 2014, after losing its transmitter site. Its programming, as well as the programming of sister station KCAP (1340 AM), was then moved to KMTX (950 AM), which Cherry Creek Radio purchased and relaunched as a new KCAP. The KBLL license was canceled by the FCC on July 5, 2016, due to the length of time for which the station had remained silent.
