= KKGR =

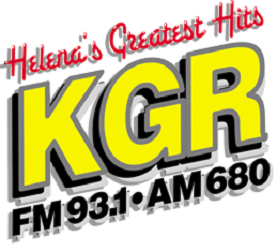
- East Helena, Montana; United States
- Broadcast area: Helena, Montana
- Frequency: 680 kHz
- Branding: KGR FM 93.1 AM 680

Programming
- Format: Classic hits

Ownership
- Owner: KGR, LLC

History
- First air date: May 26, 1988
- Former call signs: KHKR (1988–1991); KVCM (1991–1993); KHKR (1993–1996)

Technical information
- Licensing authority: FCC
- Facility ID: 49725
- Class: D
- Power: 5,000 watts (days only)
- Transmitter coordinates: 46°34′07.5″N 111°54′35.2″W
- Translators: 92.9 K225DA (Townsend); 93.1 K226BI (Helena)

Links
- Public license information: Public file; LMS
- Webcast: Listen live
- Website: kgrradio.com

KKGR (680 AM, "KGR Radio") is a radio station licensed to Helena, Montana. The station is owned by KGR, LLC, and airs a classic hits music format.

The station has been assigned the KKGR call letters by the Federal Communications Commission since November 26, 1996, and has been owned by KGR, LLC since 1999.

== History ==
KHKR began broadcasting on May 26, 1988. The station was put on the air by an investor group that included Werner Nistler and the Lonnquist family, which had just sold KXGF in Great Falls. At the time it signed on, KHKR was the only AM station playing country music in the Helena area; it was limited to daytime hours to protect KNBR in San Francisco. On May 1, KHKR was joined by an FM companion, KHKR-FM 104.1, which was intended to sign on in time for Christmas but failed to air because a tower crew did not complete work on the FM facility.

The country music on AM came to an end in 1991 when Hi-Line Radio Fellowship, which owned KXEI in Havre, leased the station. Hi-Line had been working to bring Christian radio on an FM frequency to the Helena area for some time, but motivated by delays in that process, it worked out a deal with the Lonnquists to take over KHKR instead. The call letters were changed to KVCM. Hi-Line's FM station made it to air at the end of 1993 and took the KVCM call sign with it; 680 reverted to KHKR, airing news and talk programming.

In 1996, the Lonnquists sold the companion FM to STARadio Corporation. They retained the AM station, which flipped to classic country under new KKGR call letters, until 1999, when it was sold to Jim Schaeffer, the president of KBLL-AM-FM, for $90,000.

In early 2024, the station added a second transmitter simulcasting on 92.9 MHz, covering the Townsend area. It simply rebroadcasts the 93.1 MHz signal that covers the Helena area.
