= KBLL =

KBLL may refer to:

- KBLL (FM), a radio station (99.5 FM) licensed to Helena, Montana, United States
- KBLL (AM), a former radio station (1240 AM) licensed to Helena, Montana, United States
- KTVH-DT, a radio station (channel 12) licensed to Helena, Montana, United States, which held the call sign KBLL-TV from 1961 to 1973
