= MacHaffie Site (24JF4) =

- U.S. National Register of Historic Places
- Location: Address Restricted
- Nearest city: Montana City, Montana
- Area: 3 acres (1.2 ha)
- Built: 9,340 ±120 years B.P.
- Architectural style: Prehistoric
- NRHP reference No.: 86000619
- Added to NRHP: April 3, 1986

The MacHaffie Site is an archeological site located in the foothills of the Elkhorn Mountains south of Helena, Montana. The site yielded evidence of continual human activity dating back more than 12,000 years.

== History ==
The site was discovered in 1938 when A. J. Harstad, an amateur mineralogist, spotted chipped stones and bone eroding from a cutbank, which he pointed out to Edmund and June MacHaffie. MacHaffie was a newspaper editor and well-known amateur archeologist in Helena. The MacHaffies found several artifacts near the site including what they described as a "Clovis point" and "Yuma Point".

From 1946 through 1948, a River Basin Survey was conducting a cultural resources survey of the nearby area that would later be flooded by the Canyon Ferry Dam. MacHaffie convinced the head of that crew, Wesley L. Bliss, to assess the site. Bliss collected several pieces which are currently held at the Smithsonian Institution.

Guided by MacHaffie, a researcher from University of Montana, Carling Malouf and his student Dick Forbis visited the site in 1949. Malouf obtained permission for Forbis to excavate the site. In 1951, Forbis led a party from Columbia University which conducted excavation of the site.

Forbis's findings garnered significant publicity, including a 1951 article in the New York Times. The publicity attracted looters, however many looters mistakenly dug in the wrong location.

From 1952 until 1980, academic research at the site was limited to a few University of Montana field trips and limited excavations. Forbis's student Leslie Davis resumed investigations at MacHaffie from 1989 through 2010.

The site was added to the National Register of Historic Placeson April 3, 1986. In 2009, the landowner, Pamela Bompart, donated the site to the Archaeological Conservancy with hopes of protecting the remaining resource from destruction by future housing development and looters.

== Discoveries ==
The site is unusual in that it contains multiple stratified layers with evidence of different eras of human occupation. The site contained evidence of Paleo-Indian Folsom culture more than 12,000 years ago, a Cody complex component dating to approximately 10,000 years ago, and it was also used off and on by Middle and Late Archaic hunter-gatherers dating from 7,000 to about 2,000 years ago. Forbis's findings helped to confirm the historical progression and timeline of prehistoric tool cultures.

Generally, the site shows evidence that ancient people collected stone at nearby quarries, and stopped at the MacHaffie site to break down that stone into more usable tools and pieces which were taken elsewhere for use. The majority of the artifacts collected at the site are held in the collection of the University of Montana.

== See also ==
- Anzick site
