= Your Network of Praise =

Christian radio network

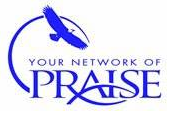
- Type: Radio network
- Country: United States

Programming
- Affiliations: Moody Radio; Salem Radio Network

Ownership
- Owner: Hi-Line Radio Fellowship

History
- Launch date: July 28, 1983

Coverage
- Availability: Montana, Wyoming, Idaho, Utah, Nebraska, North Dakota, southern Alberta and southern Saskatchewan through affiliates and translators

Links
- Webcast: Listen live
- Website: www.ynop.org

Your Network of Praise is a non-profit, listener supported, Christian broadcast radio network in the Northern United States, mainly in the state of Montana, but also in nearby states. Based in Havre, Montana, it broadcasts a mix of music and various Christian programs from a variety of sources. The original station, KXEI in Havre, started broadcasting on July 28, 1983. From 1991 to 1993, Hi-Line Radio Fellowship leased AM 680 in Helena, Montana, until its second station 103.1 FM KVCM signed on the air. In 2017, two additional stations in the Helena area were donated to Hi-Line Radio Fellowship, KBMI-FM and KHGC. In 2020, Hi-Line Radio Fellowship purchased AM 1320 KNIT in Salt Lake City for $200,000, giving Your Network of Praise a station in its largest market to date.

== Owned stations ==
| Call sign | Frequency | City of license | State | Facility ID |
|---|---|---|---|---|
| KZTQ | 99.1 FM | Merced | California | |
| KANP | 91.3 FM | Ashton | Idaho | 177234 |
| KZNP | 90.7 FM | Mullan | Idaho | 175929 |
| KXEB | 91.3 FM | Big Timber | Montana | 768279 |
| KBLW | 90.1 FM | Billings | Montana | 89078 |
| KJLF | 90.5 FM | Butte | Montana | 93010 |
| KMCJ | 99.5 FM | Colstrip | Montana | 87790 |
| KMTJ | 90.5 FM | Columbus | Montana | 175678 |
| KWPA | 91.5 FM | Glasgow | Montana | 768273 |
| KGLE | 590 AM | Glendive | Montana | 11016 |
| KGLE-FM | 91.9 FM | Glendive | Montana | 767338 |
| KGFC | 88.9 FM | Great Falls | Montana | 27118 |
| KNPC | 88.5 FM | Hardin | Montana | 177237 |
| KZLM | 107.9 FM | Harlowton | Montana | 171025 |
| KXEI (Note: First station in network) | 95.1 FM | Havre | Montana | 27117 |
| KVCM | 103.1 FM | Helena | Montana | 27119 |
| KKCP | 91.9 FM | Jordan | Montana | 768272 |
| KALS | 97.1 FM | Kalispell | Montana | 49340 |
| KLEU | 91.1 FM | Lewistown | Montana | 92240 |
| KTNY | 101.7 FM | Libby | Montana | 37524 |
| KNPM | 91.5 FM | Miles City | Montana | 175930 |
| KJCG | 88.3 FM | Missoula | Montana | 87476 |
| KPLG | 91.5 FM | Plains | Montana | 85426 |
| KXEM | 88.1 FM | Roundup | Montana | 176691 |
| KNPS | 91.7 FM | Scobey | Montana | 175940 |
| KGCM | 90.9 FM | Three Forks | Montana | 122022 |
| KXEH | 88.7 FM | Victor | Montana | 176603 |
| KPWY | 90.7 FM | West Yellowstone | Montana | 177038 |
| KAVA | 89.5 FM | Kimball | Nebraska | 768711 |
| KDND | 89.1 FM | Dickinson | North Dakota | 768282 |
| KJKR | 88.1 FM | Jamestown | North Dakota | 177249 |
| KJND-FM | 90.7 FM | Williston | North Dakota | 175935 |
| KMAE | 90.1 FM | Maeser | Utah | 767771 |
| KNIT | 1320 AM | Salt Lake City | Utah | 53500 |
| KDJY | 88.7 FM | Douglas | Wyoming | 176144 |
| KFBU | 1630 AM | Fox Farm, Wyoming | Wyoming | 87155 |
| KAXG | 89.7 FM | Gillette | Wyoming | 83087 |
| KNPJ | 88.5 FM | Greybull | Wyoming | 176113 |
| KRWY | 90.1 FM | Lander | Wyoming | 768283 |
| KTDX | 89.3 FM | Laramie | Wyoming | 93647 |
| KOHR | 88.9 FM | Sheridan | Wyoming | 89342 |
| KKWY | 88.5 FM | Wheatland | Wyoming | 768695 |
| KKBE | 89.5 FM | Winchester | Wyoming | 767302 |

=== Translators ===
| Call sign | Frequency (MHz) | City of license | State | Facility ID |
|---|---|---|---|---|
| K214FJ | 90.7 | Golden | Colorado | 147935 |
| K287AZ | 105.3 | Kellogg | Idaho | 155490 |
| K286BH | 105.1 | Mullan | Idaho | 155553 |
| K218FA | 91.5 | Salmon | Idaho | 148761 |
| K283AT | 104.5 | Wallace | Idaho | 155529 |
| K294BB | 106.7 | Baker | Montana | 144868 |
| K267BE | 101.3 | Big Sky | Montana | 142889 |
| K248CR | 97.5 | Boulder | Montana | 148836 |
| K262AZ | 100.3 | Bozeman | Montana | 153530 |
| K272EF | 102.3 | Broadus | Montana | 145423 |
| K216DS | 91.1 | Browning | Montana | 88250 |
| K218CN | 91.5 | Choteau | Montana | 87501 |
| K293BB | 106.5 | Conrad | Montana | 145598 |
| K286BO | 105.1 | Cut Bank | Montana | 35927 |
| K220FH | 91.9 | Deer Lodge | Montana | 83139 |
| K212DT | 90.3 | Dillon | Montana | 93290 |
| K296FS | 107.1 | Eureka | Montana | 149923 |
| K288EM | 105.5 | Glasgow | Montana | 69749 |
| K246BL | 97.1 | Livingston | Montana | 146548 |
| K215FG | 90.9 | Lustre | Montana | 27122 |
| K241AX | 96.1 | Malta | Montana | 144894 |
| K232CI | 94.3 | Missoula | Montana | 146259 |
| K220ED | 91.9 | Philipsburg | Montana | 65998 |
| K257BR | 99.3 | Polson | Montana | 11015 |
| K299AZ | 107.7 | Poplar | Montana | 144841 |
| K292FV | 106.3 | Red Lodge | Montana | 145305 |
| K204GL | 88.7 | Seeley Lake | Montana | 85899 |
| K201CO | 88.1 | Shelby | Montana | 27121 |
| K228FM | 93.5 | Whitefish | Montana | 148354 |
| K294BC | 106.7 | Wolf Point | Montana | 144918 |
| K220KB | 91.9 | St. John | North Dakota | 140897 |
| K233DV | 94.5 | Draper | Utah | 202892 |
| K205FE | 88.9 | Rock Springs | Wyoming | 94240 |
| K299AG | 107.7 | Rock Springs | Wyoming | 71828 |
