= KMTX =

KMTX may refer to:

- KMTX (FM), a radio station (105.3 FM) licensed to serve Helena, Montana, United States
- KCAP (AM), a radio station (950 AM) licensed to serve Helena, Montana, which used the call sign KMTX from 1976 to 2014
- KTCW, a television station (channel 45/PSIP 46) licensed to Roseburg, Oregon, United States, which used the call sign KMTX-TV from 1992 to 2006
