= South Hills, Montana =

- Census-designated place
- Location within Montana Location within the United States
- Coordinates: 46°33′23″N 111°59′52″W
- Country: United States
- State: Montana
- County: Jefferson

Area
  - Total: 5.87 sq mi (15.21 km^{2})
  - Land: 5.87 sq mi (15.21 km^{2})
  - Water: 0 sq mi (0.00 km^{2})
- Elevation: 4,803 ft (1,464 m)

Population (2020)
  - Total: 644
  - Density: 109.7/sq mi (42.34/km^{2})
- Time zone: UTC-7 (Mountain (MST))
  - Summer (DST): UTC-6 (MDT)
- Area code: 406
- FIPS code: 30-69725
- GNIS feature ID: 2583848

South Hills is a census-designated place (CDP) in Jefferson County, Montana, United States. As of the 2020 census, South Hills had a population of 644.

== Geography ==
South Hills is in northern Jefferson County. It is bordered to the south and east by unincorporated Montana City and to the north by the city of Helena in Lewis and Clark County.

According to the U.S. Census Bureau, the South Hills CDP has an area of 5.9 square miles (15.2 km^{2}), all land. The community is drained by east-flowing tributaries of Prickly Pear Creek, which flows north to the Missouri River.

== Demographics ==
Historical population
| Census | Pop. | Note | %± |
|---|---|---|---|
| 2020 | 644 | | — |
U.S. Decennial Census

== Education ==
The school districts are Montana City Elementary School District and Jefferson High School District.
