= KIMO =

- Townsend, Montana; United States
- Broadcast area: Helena, Montana
- Frequency: 107.3 MHz (HD Radio)
- Branding: The Mighty Mo 107FM

Programming
- Format: Country
- Subchannels: HD2: 104.5 Dave FM (Variety hits); HD3: Rewind 94.9 (Classic hits); HD4: Rock 96.3 (Active rock)

Ownership
- Owner: Montana Radio Company (Sale pending to Iliad Media Group)
- Sister stations: KBLL, KCAP, KMTX, KMXM, KZMT

History
- First air date: 2002 (as KINX)
- Former call signs: KINX (2001–2011); KYYN (2011)

Technical information
- Licensing authority: FCC
- Facility ID: 83110
- Class: C
- ERP: 86,000 watts
- HAAT: 659 meters (2,162 ft)
- Transmitter coordinates: 46°49′29.3″N 111°42′15.2″W
- Translators: HD2: 104.5 K283BP (Helena); HD3: 94.9 K235BW (Helena); HD4: 96.3 K242CX (Helena)

Links
- Public license information: Public file; LMS
- Webcast: Listen Live; Listen Live (HD2); Listen Live (HD3); Listen Live (HD4)
- Website: mightymo.com 1045davefm.com (HD2); 949helena.com (HD3) rock963helena.com (HD4)

KIMO (107.3 FM, "The Mighty Mo 107FM") is a commercial radio station located in Townsend, Montana and serves the Helena area. KIMO airs a country music format and is owned by the Montana Radio Company.

== History of call letters ==
The call letters KIMO were previously assigned in 1947 to an AM station in Independence, Missouri.

== HD Radio ==
In August 2017 KIMO-HD4 launched an active rock format, branded as "Rock 96.3" (simulcast on translator K242CX 96.3 FM Helena), and

- KIMO-HD2 launched a variety hits format, branded as "104.5 Dave FM" (simulcast on translator K283BP 104.5 FM Helena). The former was re-located from a station divested by the company.

KIMO HD2

KIMO HD3
