= Montana City, Montana =

- Census-designated place
- Location of Montana City, Montana
- Coordinates: 46°32′14″N 111°55′54″W
- Country: United States
- State: Montana
- County: Jefferson

Area
  - Total: 34.12 sq mi (88.37 km^{2})
  - Land: 34.10 sq mi (88.31 km^{2})
  - Water: 0.023 sq mi (0.06 km^{2})
- Elevation: 4,049 ft (1,234 m)

Population (2020)
  - Total: 2,918
  - Density: 85.6/sq mi (33.04/km^{2})
- Time zone: UTC-7 (Mountain (MST))
  - Summer (DST): UTC-6 (MDT)
- ZIP code: 59634
- Area code: 406
- FIPS code: 30-51175
- GNIS feature ID: 0787566

Montana City is an unincorporated community and census-designated place (CDP) in Jefferson County, Montana, United States. As of the 2020 census, Montana City had a population of 2,918. It is part of the Helena Micropolitan Statistical Area.

== History ==
Montana City is located on top of one of the oldest prehistoric sites in the state of Montana. As early as 9,000 BCE, Native Americans came to Montana City to collect chert, a rock similar to flint, which was used to make spear tips, arrowheads, and knives. White American explorers discovered gold at the site on July 2, 1862, and later that year U.S. Army Captain Jason L. Fisk brought a mule train from Minnesota which stopped at the site and built the first houses that became Montana City. The town became one of the most important mining centers in Montana during the height of the gold rush in the 1860s. The Montana Town Company laid out the city in 1864, naming it after the territory's new name. Chinese miners soon made up a majority of the workforce when the mines began to play out in 1868, and the town saw a brief revival after the arrival of the railroads and the establishment of a post office in the 1880s. At its height in the 1880s, Montana City had 3,000 residents and competed for the location of the state capital.

Montana City was almost a ghost town for most of the 20th century until the Permanente Cement Company built a cement manufacturing plant there in 1940. Today, Montana City is a bedroom community serving Helena.

== Geography ==
Montana City is located in northern Jefferson County. It is bordered to the northwest by unincorporated South Hills, to the northeast by the town of East Helena in Lewis and Clark County, and to the south by unincorporated Clancy.

According to the United States Census Bureau, the Montana City CDP has a total area of 34.1 square miles (88.3 km^{2}), of which 0.02 square miles (0.06 km^{2}), or 0.07%, are water. Prickly Pear Creek, a tributary of the Missouri River, flows northward through the community.

== Demographics ==
Historical population
Census	Pop.	Note	%±
2020	2,918		—
U.S. Decennial Census

=== 2020 census ===
As of the 2020 census, Montana City had a population of 2,918. The median age was 49.1 years. 23.1% of residents were under the age of 18 and 23.0% of residents were 65 years of age or older. For every 100 females there were 104.1 males, and for every 100 females age 18 and over there were 99.3 males age 18 and over.

0.0% of residents lived in urban areas, while 100.0% lived in rural areas.

There were 1,097 households in Montana City, of which 29.4% had children under the age of 18 living in them. Of all households, 75.2% were married-couple households, 11.4% were households with a male householder and no spouse or partner present, and 9.7% were households with a female householder and no spouse or partner present. About 14.6% of all households were made up of individuals and 7.8% had someone living alone who was 65 years of age or older.

There were 1,128 housing units, of which 2.7% were vacant. The homeowner vacancy rate was 0.7% and the rental vacancy rate was 0.0%.

Racial composition as of the 2020 census
Race	Number	Percent
White	2,675	91.7%
Black or African American	7	0.2%
American Indian and Alaska Native	15	0.5%
Asian	14	0.5%
Native Hawaiian and Other Pacific Islander	0	0.0%
Some other race	15	0.5%
Two or more races	192	6.6%
Hispanic or Latino (of any race)	71	2.4%

=== 2010 census ===
As of the 2010 census, there were 2,715 people in Montana City, a 30% increase over the 2000 census.

=== 2000 census ===
As of the 2000 census, there were 2,094 people, 697 households, and 627 families residing in the CDP. The population density was 74.2 inhabitants per square mile (28.6/km^{2}). There were 709 housing units at an average density of 25.1/sq mi (9.7/km^{2}). The racial makeup of the CDP was 98.19% White, 0.05% African American, 0.48% Native American, 0.10% Asian, 0.14% Pacific Islander, 0.10% from other races, and 0.96% from two or more races. Hispanic or Latino of any race were 1.10% of the population.

There were 697 households, out of which 46.1% had children under the age of 18 living with them, 84.4% were married couples living together, 2.9% had a female householder with no husband present, and 9.9% were non-families. 7.5% of all households were made up of individuals, and 2.3% had someone living alone who was 65 years of age or older. The average household size was 2.99 and the average family size was 3.14.

In the CDP, the population was spread out, with 30.9% under the age of 18, 4.7% from 18 to 24, 28.2% from 25 to 44, 29.4% from 45 to 64, and 6.7% who were 65 years of age or older. The median age was 39 years. For every 100 females, there were 98.5 males. For every 100 females age 18 and over, there were 101.5 males.

The median income for a household in the CDP was $66,027, and the median income for a family was $67,240. Males had a median income of $40,909 versus $29,508 for females. The per capita income for the CDP was $21,774. About 3.5% of families and 4.0% of the population were below the poverty line, including 4.3% of those under age 18 and 11.3% of those age 65 or over.

== Education ==
Montana City Elementary School District is the elementary school district for the majority of the CDP, while some parts are in the Clancy Elementary School District. All residents are assigned to the Jefferson High School District

The Montana City district educates students from kindergarten to 8th grade. Montana City School has students from kindergarten to 5th grade and Montana City Middle School has 6th to 8th grade. In the 2021-2022 school year, there was a total of 467 students in the district.

Jefferson High School in Boulder serves the Montana City students for grades 9-12.

The North Jefferson County Library has a location in Montana City.

== Media ==
Newspaper coverage for the town is provided by the Independent Record out of Helena.

There are two radio stations licensed in Montana City. KHGC is a Christian radio station. KWLG is part of the Jefferson County Radio network.

== Infrastructure ==
Interstate 15 passes through town from north to south. Montana Highway 518 connects the town to East Helena.

Healthcare is provided in Helena.
