= KOYT =

KOYT may refer to:

- KOYT-LP, a low-power radio station (97.1 FM) licensed to serve Anza, California, United States
- KHGC, a radio station (98.5 FM) licensed to serve Montana City, Montana, United States, which held the call sign KOYT from 2011 to 2014
