= Josephine Airey =

Irish-American madam and businesswoman

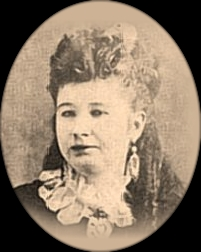
- Photograph of Josephine Airey
- Born: Mary Welch c. 1844; Ireland
- Died: October 25, 1899 (aged 55); Helena, Montana, US
- Other names: "Chicago Joe" Hensley
- Occupations: Prostitute, madam, landowner, proprietor
- Known for: Proprietor of brothels, a variety theatre, saloons, and dance halls in Helena, Montana
- Spouse: James T. Hensley

Josephine "Chicago Joe" Airey (c. 1844 – October 25, 1899), was an Irish-born American prostitute, madam, and proprietor of brothels, dance halls, a variety theatre, and saloons in Helena, Montana. She eventually became the most influential landowner in Helena. She was known as "Chicago Joe" Hensley following her marriage to James T. Hensley.

== Origins ==
Josephine was born Mary Welch in Ireland in about 1844. When she emigrated to New York City in 1858, she changed her name to Josephine Airey. She held a menial job, but this soon bored her, so she moved to Chicago where she took up prostitution. In 1867, she quit Chicago and moved out west to the newly established gold mining town of Helena, Montana. There she opened a "hurdy-gurdy house", a dance hall in which customers paid attractive, seductively dressed women for a dance, which quickly became a success due to its appeal to the local miners since women were very scarce. She left behind two sisters in Chicago who she supported throughout her career.

== "Chicago Joe" ==
She soon expanded her business; a fire in 1874 provided her with the opportunity of buying up property from those who could not afford to rebuild which made her the richest landowner on Wood Street. She was the owner of the "Grand", a large brothel on the corner of State and Joliet streets. In 1878, she married James T. Hensley, and together they built a stone, fire-proof dance hall as well as the "Red Light Saloon". She began to be known by the nickname of "Chicago Joe" Hensley. Josephine began to rent her numerous properties to other businesses, making her the most influential landowner in Helena. Her wealth and influence enabled her to donate to charities and political campaigns. Josephine and her husband later built a large vaudeville-style variety theatre called "The Coliseum", which proved greatly successful, due to its rich furnishings and the beautiful girls Josephine hired to perform. Josephine was famed for her lavish style of dress, lifestyle and parties she and her husband regularly gave.

Although prostitution was legal at this time in the United States, there was still much controversy surrounding Josephine's business practices. An article in 1884 claimed that Josephine had tricked girls into leaving Chicago to come work for her brothels. The idea was that she told them they would be working in a hotel, but never specified what their job would be exactly. This allegation was false, but Chicago Joe was known for paying the fare from Chicago to Helena, which essentially meant she was importing employees.

In January 1883, she placed a notice in Helena's newspaper, the Daily Independent, ordering local saloon owners and gambling houses not to serve her husband liquor, allow him to gamble or loan him money on pain of prosecution. Later that same year, on 24 December 1883 she advertised that she was holding a Grand Masquerade Ball at the "Red Light Saloon" and issued invitations to all the citizens of Helena.

Then in 1885 legislators in Montana passed a law that made the "hurdy gurdy" house illegal. These dance halls got their name from the stringed instrument often found in them. Josephine's attorney was able to keep her out of legal troubles, but she was forced to reorganize her business and be less prominent in the town. After a few years, she re-opened the Coliseum and converted part of the building into a brothel. "The Coliseum" began to lose its popularity in 1890, as Helena became more respectable. In the Panic of 1893, Josephine lost all her property apart from the "Red Light Saloon". Soon she and her husband were forced to live in the small rooms above the saloon.

== Buildings ==
At the height of her success Chicago Joe owned the Red Light Saloon, The Grand Bordello, The Coliseum Variety Theater, and various other businesses in the town. At one point she was the largest landowner in the entire Red Light district. These buildings she owned were not shacks, but large event centers that could host parties as well as serve their intended purposes. For example, the Coliseum cost Josephine over $30,000 to build in the 1880s. The panic of 1893 claimed all of her holdings but the Red Light Saloon and she lived the last few years of her life in a room above it.

== Contemporaries ==
Josephine's business model began to rub off on her employees and in 1875 Mrs. Lou Couselle started her own brothel in Bozeman, Montana. Much like her former boss she used mortgages to make money and at the time of her death she had an estate worth over $20,000. Again much like Josephine, Mrs. Lou used the profits of prostitution to expand her business empire. Mollie "Crazy Belle Crafton" was another woman who followed the path blazed by Josephine. Mollie built the Castle Bordello, which cost over $12,000 in the early 1880s. Josephine's success clearly had a profound effect on the minds of other women in the area at this time.

== Death ==
Josephine died of pneumonia on October 25, 1899. The citizens of Helena gave her a magnificent funeral with many speeches praising her accomplishments. In the final years of her life she lived under meager conditions. The glory of her early days had been dried up in the panic of 1893. Her death saddened the community and made front-page news. Her generosity was noted and she was buried in the cemetery at a Catholic church.

== See also ==
- Dorothy Baker (madam)
