= Dorothy Baker (madam) =

American madam from Helena, Montana

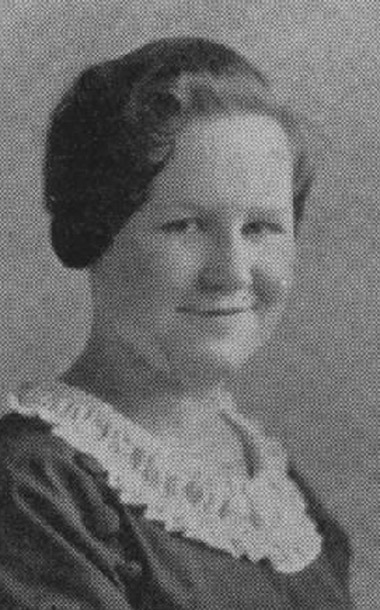
- Dorothy Baker's 1933 High School yearbook photo
- Born: Dorothy Putnam; September 30, 1915
- Died: May 14, 1973 (aged 57); Great Falls, Montana
- Other name: Big Dorothy
- Occupations: Prostitute, madam
- Known for: Proprietor of the last brothel in Helena, Montana

Dorothy Josephine Baker (September 30, 1915 – May 14, 1973), also known as Big Dorothy, was an American madam in Helena, Montana in the mid-20th century. She ran a brothel officially known as "Dorothy's Rooms" on Last Chance Gulch in Helena, which, according to some historians, was the most famous brothel in Montana. The brothel operated from the mid-1950s until it was shut down in a police raid in 1973. While running the brothel, she also donated to many charities, including churches and law enforcement programs, making her generally popular among the local citizens.

== Personal life ==
She was born Dorothy Putnam, though she also used two different middle names, "Ione" and "Josephine." Baker signed her name as "Dodie" in her Great Falls High School yearbook in 1933, and became known as "Big Dorothy" during her working years. Her nickname most likely was due to her weight, which was estimated at 240 pounds (110 kg). Speculation is that she adopted Josephine as her middle name in honor of one of Helena's best-known madams of the late 1800s, Josephine "Chicago Joe" Airey. Legend says she took the surname Baker with inspiration from an Eddy’s Bakery truck. Baker had an older sister, Margaret, who had a son and daughter. Dorothy paid Margaret's children's college tuition. Dorothy also had a brother. While Margaret was a devout woman who considered becoming a nun, she was close to Dorothy in spite of their different life choices and would bring her family from Great Falls to Helena for visits about 4 times a year.

Dorothy had one known child, a girl, with a client of her establishment. For reasons unknown, Dorothy abandoned the girl at a post office when her daughter was three. The girl knew the identity of her mother, and maintained a distant relationship throughout her life, even introducing her children briefly.

Baker died on Monday morning, May 14, 1973, less than a month after a police raid shut down her brothel, and 10 hours after being admitted to a hospital in Great Falls with an acute illness. She had diabetes and also was sick with the flu at the time of the raid, but her actual cause of death was unspecified. Her death occurred one week before her court hearing. Most of Baker's belongings were auctioned off after she died but some are owned by the Montana Historical Society.

== Business ==
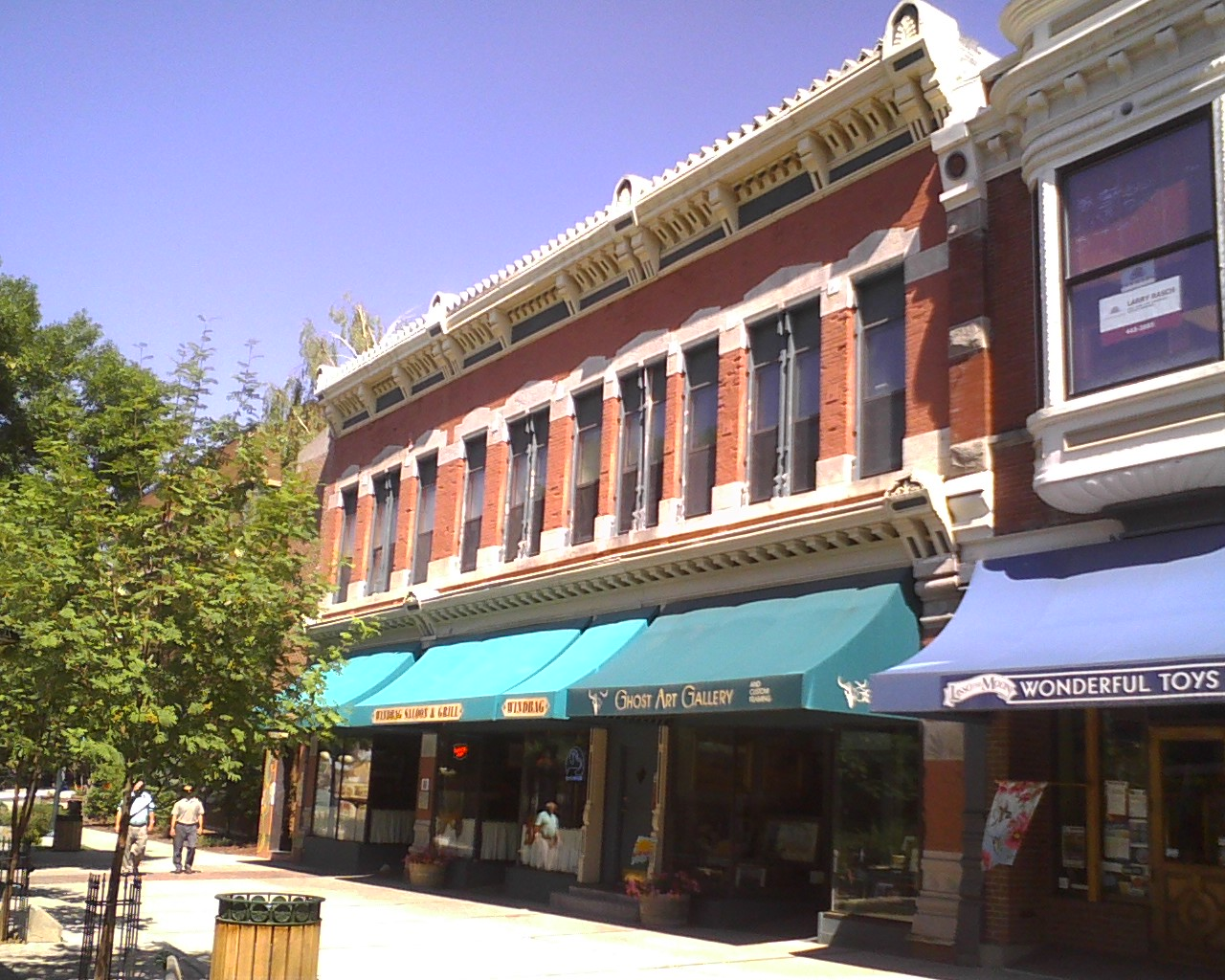
Dorothy's brothel was on the second floor of this building in downtown Helena

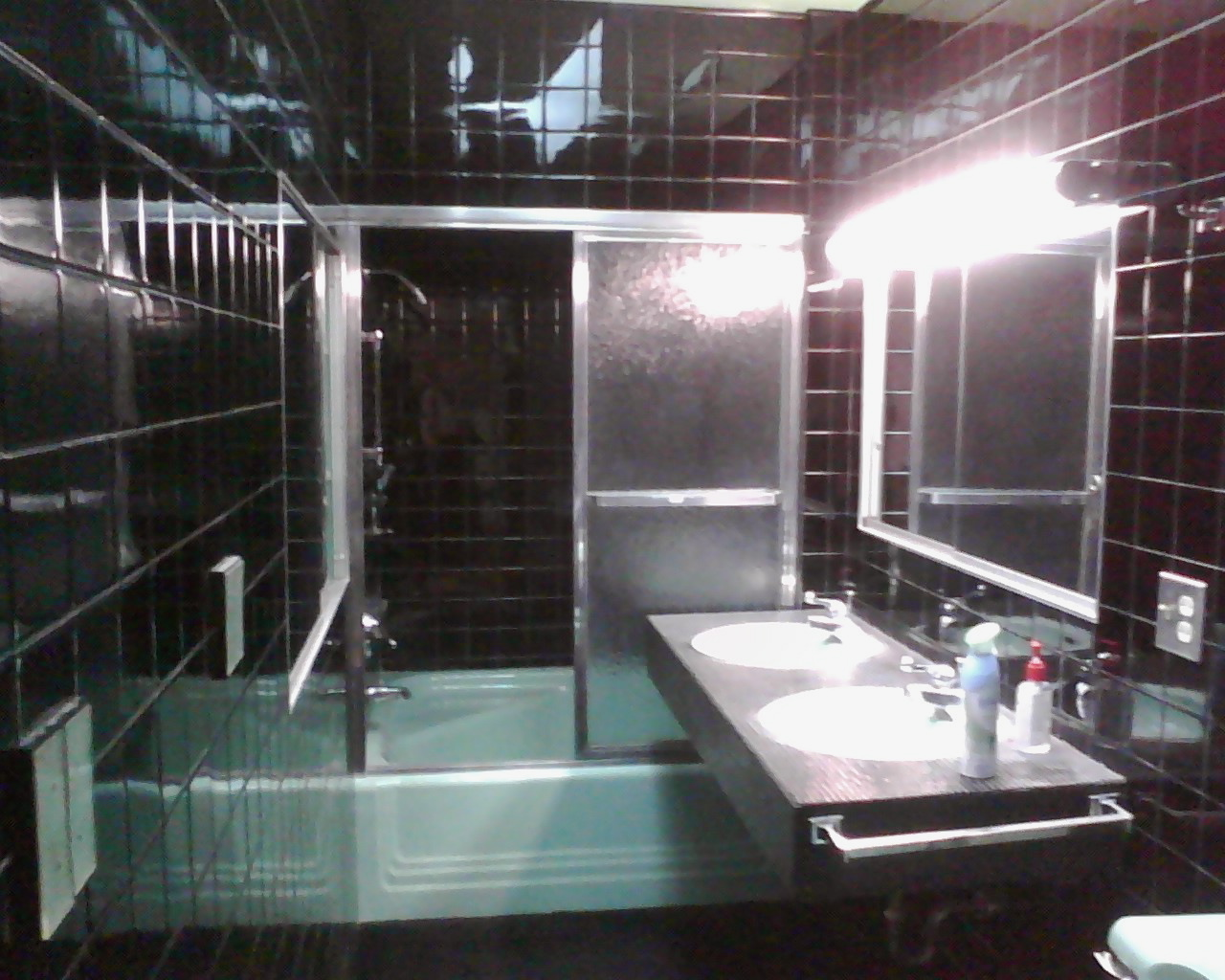
Dorothy's fully preserved personal bathroom, with starburst lights, black tile and a double-wide bathtub

Baker was the last in a long line of Helena madams. While Helena had a thriving red light district in the late 1800s, most brothels in Helena's red light district were shut down following World War I. The prostitution business then moved downtown, with a madam named Pearl Maxwell opening a brothel in that area by 1918. The building that came to house Dorothy's, called the St. Louis Block, was built in 1882. It originally was a dry goods store, and over the years had business tenants that included bars, a Vaudeville theater, bowling alley, bootery, and bank. The location also was briefly a furniture store. The upstairs was first opened as a bordello by Ida Levy in 1927 during Prohibition, naming it "Ida's Rooms", using a common euphemism to mask the true nature of the business. Levy also owned the Silver Dollar Bar downstairs, and told her extended family in New York state that she was merely a bar owner. Baker took over the brothel business about 1955 from Levy, for whom Dorothy apparently had worked. Like Levy, she kept her business discreet, listing it in the phone book as "Dorothy's Rooms", though anyone inquiring about renting living space there was graciously turned away. Next door to Dorothy's was the Yat Son Chinese restaurant, where Baker often stopped for coffee and complained to the owner about how hard it was to find good "help". She did not drive and always took taxis. She would often tip children generously for flagging down a cab.

According to historian Ellen Baumler, Dorothy's brothel was probably the most famous in the state of Montana. The upstairs, accessible via a narrow stairway from Last Chance Gulch, or via a ground floor door in the back of the building (which was built into a hillside), had five sitting rooms and seven bedrooms, and the south end of the second story also served as Baker's personal private residence. The facility hosted a Wurlitzer jukebox, and was noted for one room with a large, elaborate round bed, with the establishment generally having a flamboyant but tacky decor. Baker did not have a liquor license, though at the time of the 1973 raid, one allegation made was that an undercover officer had been sold alcohol in addition to the services of a prostitute.

The place was a maze of cheap furniture, space-age lamps, wall paper with sprinkles, gilded mirrors in unusual locations, and . . . [ladies] who scampered about on high-heeled slippers with pompoms on the toes.

— an anonymous former patron

Today, the main floor is occupied by two businesses, a bar and restaurant known as the "Windbag Saloon and Grill", and the adjacent "Ghost Art Gallery", which has its framing shop on the second floor, in the area that once included the main entrance, a large sitting room, and Dorothy's personal residence. Most of the remaining upstairs rooms have been converted to office space, but one room has been kept precisely as it was at the time of the police raid in 1973; her bathroom—which has an unusual black-and turquoise green decor, cutout starbursts in the dropped ceiling, and an oversized bathtub. The other businesses that occupy the 2nd floor include, Misty Boles Intimate Photography, and in 2021, the Ghost Art Gallery moved their gallery upstairs to make way for a lounge and gaming parlor, that was opened in the vacated space. There are numerous reports that the building is haunted.

== Police raid and aftermath ==
Mug Shot of Baker

"It's a beautiful day...now watch some bastard louse it up."

— sign in Dorothy's brothel, noticed by the police during the April 17, 1973 raid

Dorothy's remained in business until the brothel was raided on April 17, 1973, on the orders of the County Attorney, Thomas F. Dowling. Dorothy's business sense had kept her operation in good graces with the local community. She catered to many powerful individuals, including state legislators; donated to children's causes, and routinely tipped off police if she noticed drug pushers in the neighborhood. While she had problems with the law over the years, they were minor: In 1963 the county attorney in office at the time, John C. Harrison, who later became a Justice of the Montana Supreme Court, had tried to close her down but was unsuccessful. A raid in 1969 resulted only in the arrest of another woman for illegally selling liquor. In December 1970, Dowling had obtained a restraining order against Baker, ordering her to stop operating a brothel, but Baker had ignored it. However, the brothel gained more attention than usual from the city officials in the fall of 1972 when Baker obtained a $500 federal Urban Renewal grant to refurbish the building for "retail purposes". Mayor Steven Keim deflected criticism from himself, claiming he was out of town when the decision on the urban renewal grant was made. Not long after, two undercover agents investigated the business, reporting that they had paid a dollar for an alcoholic drink and paid $20 for a woman who disrobed in their presence, deemed sufficient evidence for a district judge to authorize a writ of injunction that permitted the police raid and forcible closing of the business.

Its closure caused an uproar in the community because of Baker's purported kindness, generosity, and reputation for running a clean and honest establishment. City Commissioner Ed Loranz, who admitted to visiting Dorothy's, was among her vocal supporters. An unnamed local minister was also sympathetic because of all the good Baker had done in the community. Some local women were even upset, viewing the brothel as an outlet for behavior that might otherwise be on the streets. Dowling was denounced as having the "asinine morality of a pipsqueak". When Baker died shortly after, any legal case became moot, and all court proceedings ended. There was speculation that if Baker had lived she would have stayed in business.

Baker left her brother and sister an estate worth $60,000. An auction of Baker's belongings was held on September 28, 1973. While Baker's heirs had to sell the building because the urban renewal construction downtown had blocked the ground floor entrance, forcing out a retail tenant, the bar reopened in 1976 as "Big Dorothy's Saloon", and the remainder of the building reopened with retail businesses soon after. A female state legislator, Dorothy Eck, proposed making Dorothy's Rooms a historical landmark.
