= KJKR =

Coordinates: 46.910278°N 98.707778°W

- Jamestown, North Dakota; United States
- Frequency: 88.1 MHz
- Branding: Your Network of Praise

Programming
- Format: Christian radio
- Affiliations: Your Network of Praise

Ownership
- Owner: Hi-Line Radio Fellowship, Inc.

History
- First air date: March 16, 2012

Technical information
- Licensing authority: FCC
- Facility ID: 177249
- Class: A
- ERP: 4,000 watts
- HAAT: 1 meter (3 ft 3 in)

Links
- Public license information: Public file; LMS
- Webcast: Listen live
- Website: http://www.ynop.org/

KJKR (88.1 MHz) is a Christian radio station licensed to Jamestown, North Dakota. The station is owned by Hi-Line Radio Fellowship, Inc. and is an affiliate of Your Network of Praise.

== History ==
KJKR began broadcasting at 10 p.m. on March 16, 2012, and was the student run station of Jamestown College. Effective May 8, 2019, the station was sold to Hi-Line Radio Fellowship for $20,000, and it adopted a Christian format as an affiliate of Your Network of Praise.
