= Four Georgians =

Group of gold prospectors in Montana, US

The Four Georgians were a group of gold prospectors who are traditionally credited for discovering the Last Chance placer gold strike of Helena, Montana. They were Reginald ("Robert" / "Bob") Stanley, John Cowan, D. J. Miller, and John Crab. Of the four, the only actual Georgian was Cowan, who hailed from Acworth, Georgia. The other three came from Alabama (Miller), Iowa (Crab) and England (Stanley). It has been speculated that they were named "Georgians" not from where they came from, but because they were practicing the "Georgian method" of placer mining.

In 1864, they left the Alder Gulch area of Virginia City, Montana Territory, heading north toward the Kootenai River country to pursue rumored prospects there. En route, they heard that the Kootenai prospects had played out, and instead decided to prospect the Little Blackfoot River. They crossed the Continental Divide to the Prickly Pear Creek drainage, still finding only minimal signs of gold at best. Noting a small creek in the Prickly Pear Valley with the best prospects so far, they again moved north to explore the Marias River. Still finding little gold after six weeks of hard work, they returned south to the place they referred to as Last Chance Gulch, since it would be their final opportunity on a long, arduous prospecting trip. They were prepared to give up on the whole area.

On July 14, 1864, they dug two prospect pits on Last Chance Gulch upstream from their earlier efforts. Both pits revealed flat gold nuggets and gold dust. All their efforts had finally paid off. Eventually, Crab and Cowan were sent back to Virginia City for more supplies, other prospectors began appearing, and the Last Chance Gulch bonanza began.

It was the evening of July 14, 1864. Stanley later wrote:

...while my partners dug some holes near the mouth of the gulch, I took pick, shovel and pan and made my way up stream looking for a bar on which to put down a hole. (It was) a fine still evening with the charm of treading the unknown and unexplored.... A tiny stream rippled under the banks.... I commenced a hole on the bar and put it down to bedrock, some six or seven feet. Taking a pan of gravel from the bottom, I panned it in the little stream. Three or four little flat, smooth nuggets was the result; nuggets that made the pan ring when dropped into it....

In 1867, the Four Georgians finally sold out their claims and took $40,000 of gold dust by wagon to Fort Benton to board a steam boat down the Missouri River and eventually all the way to the U.S. Mint in Philadelphia where they cashed in three years of hard labor in the Montana gold fields.
