= Capital Hill Mall =

Shopping centre in Montana

- Location: Helena, Montana
- Coordinates: 46°35′25.87″N 112°00′48.91″W
- Opened: March 4, 1965; 61 years ago
- Closed: 2017; 9 years ago
- Developer: Don F. Hobinson and William H. Miles
- Num. of anchor tenants: 0 (2 at peak)
- Floor area: 213,000 sq ft (19,800 m^{2})
- Floors: 1

Capital Hill Mall was an enclosed shopping center in Helena, Montana. It opened on March 4, 1965, and was the first and only enclosed mall in the city. The mall operated for over five decades, from 1965 to 2017, before being demolished in February 2019.

== History ==
Capital Hill Mall was a joint-venture between Don F. Hobinson and William H. Miles; it opened on March 4, 1965, as the only enclosed shopping center in Helena. The mall was 213,000 sq ft. The mall debuted with two department stores: Hennessy's and an Albertsons Food Center. Other stores at the grand opening included Zales Jewelers, Jorud's Hallmark Shop, and Gamer's Shoes.

In 1982, an expansion and remodel project began that would demolish the former Albertsons store to make way for a new 80,000-square-foot JCPenney. The grand opening celebrations were held on September 12, 1984.

Hennessy's was acquired by Dillard's in 1998. Dillard's made minor renovations and rebranded the store under the Dillard's name.

Dillard's announced it would close on February 27, 2010, and the store permanently shut its doors in May 2010.

In 2017, Lucky Lil's Casino, the last remaining tenant of the mall, announced its closure and shut down in January. With no other tenants remaining, the mall officially closed shortly thereafter, leaving only the JCPenney.

JCPenney announced its closure on March 17, 2017, and the store permanently closed in August 2017.

Demolition of the vacant mall began in February 2019, and the final wall was brought down on March 27, 2019.

In August 2020, construction began on new developments at the site, including a Taco Bell, Starbucks, a bank, and a medical office.
