= KMXM =

Radio station in Helena Valley Northeast, Montana

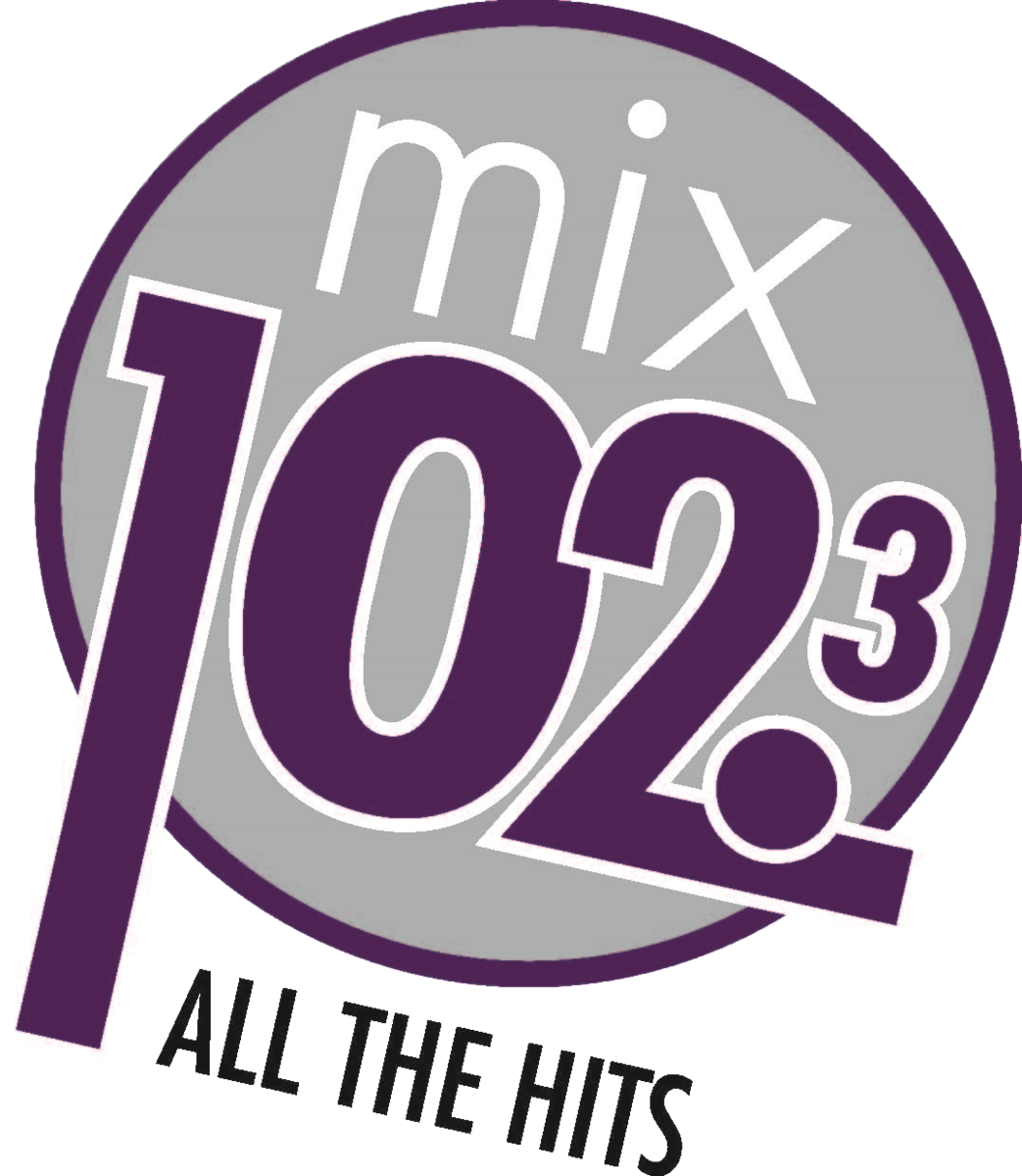
- Helena Valley Northeast, Montana; United States
- Broadcast area: Helena, Montana
- Frequency: 102.3 MHz
- Branding: Mix 102.3

Programming
- Format: Top 40 (CHR)

Ownership
- Owner: The Montana Radio Company, LLC (Sale pending to Iliad Media Group)
- Sister stations: KBLL, KCAP, KIMO, KMTX, KZMT

History
- First air date: 2008 (as KZUS at 101.7)
- Former call signs: KZUS (2007–2011)
- Former frequencies: 101.7 MHz (2008–2011)
- Call sign meaning: K MiX Montana

Technical information
- Licensing authority: FCC
- Facility ID: 164132
- Class: C2
- ERP: 1,450 watts
- HAAT: 652 meters (2,139 ft)
- Transmitter coordinates: 46°46′7″N 112°1′21″W

Links
- Public license information: Public file; LMS
- Webcast: Listen Live
- Website: www.mixhelena.com

KMXM (102.3 FM) is a radio station licensed to Helena Valley Northeast, Montana, United States. The station is currently owned by The Montana Radio Company, LLC. It airs a contemporary hit radio format.

== See also ==
- List of radio stations in Montana
