= Carling Malouf =

American archeologist

Carling Malouf was an American archeologist born in Fillmore, Utah on June 9, 1916.

== Education ==
In 1940, he graduated with a bachelor's degree in business and economics from the University of Utah. As an undergraduate, Malouf worked on an archaeological dig in central Utah, which compelled him to obtain a master's degree in anthropology at the University of Utah. While working on his master's, Malouf met his wife Arline, and the couple was married in 1941.

Military service during World War II interrupted Malouf's work on a doctorate in anthropology at Columbia University. During his service, the couple moved to various posts and stations in Utah, California, and Arizona. In 1946, Malouf was able to resume his doctoral studies at Columbia and he graduated 2 years later. Shortly after graduation in 1948, Malouf was offered a faculty position at the University of Montana in Missoula and he, Arline, and their four young children returned to the west.

== Professional career ==
While at the University of Montana, Carling Malouf played a large role in the development of the departments of Anthropology and Native American Studies, and was chair of the department of Anthropology from 1969 to 1977. Malouf was an avid researcher in the fields of Archaeology, Ethnology, and Native American Studies. His primary research interests included Native American tribes of Montana, the Plains, and the greater Northwest, comparative ethnology, and archaeological sites in Montana, including Fort Owen. Malouf's involvement in anthropology and archaeology also extended outside of the university system. He was a supporter and a member of the board of directors of the Montana Archaeological Society, an organization devoted to promoting research and public involvement in archaeology in the state of Montana. Malouf contributed many articles to the Society's publication, “Archaeology in Montana”, from the years 1959–2000. Malouf was also involved in the development of the Head Start program. In 1960, he was a member of the Montana Child Welfare Committee, a group that made periodic reports to the White House regarding the state of education and youth in Montana. He became a consultant in Anthropology for Project Head Start for the Office of Economic Opportunity. In 1969, Malouf, along with 150 other education specialists, was invited to the White House to a conference for the development of the Head Start Program. Later, he and his wife toured reservations in Montana, Idaho, and Wyoming to provide information and ideas to administrators for the new programs.

Malouf retired from the University of Montana in 1988 and was honored that same year at the Montana Archaeological Society's Annual Conference. Following his retirement, Malouf continued to do research and publish articles. Carling Malouf died March 21, 2007, at the age of 90.
