= KMTX (FM) =

Radio station in Helena, Montana

- Helena, Montana; United States
- Broadcast area: Helena metropolitan area
- Frequency: 105.3 MHz (HD Radio)
- Branding: 105.3 KMTX

Programming
- Format: Adult contemporary
- Affiliations: Westwood One

Ownership
- Owner: Kevin Terry (Sale pending to Iliad Media Group); (The Montana Radio Company, LLC)
- Sister stations: KBLL; KCAP; KIMO; KMXM; KZMT

History
- First air date: 1985
- Former call signs: KPEF (2/1984-3/1984, CP); KMTX-FM (1984–2014)
- Call sign meaning: Montana

Technical information
- Licensing authority: FCC
- Facility ID: 8668
- Class: C0
- ERP: 31,000 watts
- HAAT: 593 meters (1,946 ft)
- Transmitter coordinates: 46°44′52″N 112°19′47″W
- Translator: 98.1 K251AC (Helena)

Links
- Public license information: Public file; LMS
- Webcast: Listen live
- Website: www.kmtxfm.com

KMTX (105.3 MHz) is an FM radio station licensed to serve Helena, Montana. The station is owned by Kevin Terry, through licensee The Montana Radio Company, LLC. It airs an adult contemporary music format.

The station was assigned the KMTX-FM call letters by the Federal Communications Commission on March 7, 1984. The station changed its call sign to KMTX on December 31, 2014.
