= East Helena, Montana =

- City
- Location of East Helena, Montana
- Coordinates: 46°35′07″N 111°54′57″W
- Country: United States
- State: Montana
- County: Lewis and Clark

Government
  - Mayor: Kelly Harris

Area
  - City: 4.12 sq mi (10.67 km^{2})
  - Land: 4.05 sq mi (10.50 km^{2})
  - Water: 0.066 sq mi (0.17 km^{2})
- Elevation: 3,891 ft (1,186 m)

Population (2020)
  - City: 1,944
  - Density: 479.5/sq mi (185.14/km^{2})
  - Metro: 83,058
- Time zone: UTC-7 (Mountain (MST))
  - Summer (DST): UTC-6 (MDT)
- ZIP code: 59635
- Area code: 406
- FIPS code: 30-23125
- GNIS feature ID: 2412460
- Website: www.easthelenamt.us

East Helena is a city in Lewis and Clark County, Montana, United States, approximately 5 miles (8 km) east of downtown Helena. The population was 1,944 at the 2020 census. It is part of the Helena Micropolitan Statistical Area, which includes all of Lewis and Clark and Jefferson counties; its population is 83,058 according to the 2020 Census.

== History ==
In 1864 gold was discovered in a gulch off the Prickly Pear Creek. This led to the founding of a mining camp along a small creek in the area which the prospectors called "Last Chance Gulch". In 1876 Drumlummon Mine opened and it produced a rich bounty of gold and silver worth millions of dollars.

In 1888, the Helena & Livingston Smelting & Reduction Company's smelter was built. Workers and their families moved to the area. The settlement officially became the town of East Helena in 1889.

On August 19, 1919, a fire destroyed much of the town.

The smelter plant operated from 1888 to 2001. It processed silver-lead ore. From 1927 to 1972, the Anaconda Company had a zinc recovery plant which supplied their Great Falls zinc refinery.

In 1984 East Helena was declared a Superfund Cleanup Site by the United States Environmental Protection Agency. The lead and zinc smelting led to deposits of heavy metals, arsenic, and other hazardous chemicals in both the soil and water.

== Geography ==
According to the United States Census Bureau, the city has a total area of 1.74 square miles (4.51 km^{2}), of which 1.73 square miles (4.48 km^{2}) is land and 0.01 square miles (0.03 km^{2}) is water.

East Helena is located in the Helena Valley, an area marked by the Missouri River. The Big Belt Mountains are to the east. The Elkhorn Mountains and Boulder Hills are to the south.

Several wilderness and recreation areas are around East Helena. Canyon Ferry Lake, 13 miles (21 km) east, is Montana's third largest body of water. The Gates of the Mountains Wilderness, 28 miles (45 km) north, is part of the Helena National Forest. Lake Helena is 9 miles (14 km) north and Hauser Lake is 10 miles (16 km) north-east. Spring Meadow Lake State Park, 9 miles (14 km) east, features a man-made spring-fed lake.

=== Climate ===
According to the Köppen Climate Classification system, East Helena has a semi-arid climate, abbreviated "BSk" on climate maps.

== Demographics ==
Historical population
Census	Pop.	Note	%±
1930	1,039		—
1940	1,143		10.0%
1950	1,216		6.4%
1960	1,490		22.5%
1970	1,651		10.8%
1980	1,647		−0.2%
1990	1,538		−6.6%
2000	1,642		6.8%
2010	1,984		20.8%
2020	1,944		−2.0%
U.S. Decennial Census

=== 2020 census ===
As of the 2020 census, East Helena had a population of 1,944. The median age was 38.2 years. 23.5% of residents were under the age of 18 and 16.7% of residents were 65 years of age or older. For every 100 females there were 94.0 males, and for every 100 females age 18 and over there were 90.3 males age 18 and over.

99.2% of residents lived in urban areas, while 0.8% lived in rural areas.

There were 867 households in East Helena, of which 30.4% had children under the age of 18 living in them. Of all households, 39.6% were married-couple households, 22.1% were households with a male householder and no spouse or partner present, and 31.9% were households with a female householder and no spouse or partner present. About 32.8% of all households were made up of individuals and 13.7% had someone living alone who was 65 years of age or older.

There were 915 housing units, of which 5.2% were vacant. The homeowner vacancy rate was 1.7% and the rental vacancy rate was 5.3%.

Racial composition as of the 2020 census
Race	Number	Percent
White	1,659	85.3%
Black or African American	3	0.2%
American Indian and Alaska Native	52	2.7%
Asian	10	0.5%
Native Hawaiian and Other Pacific Islander	3	0.2%
Some other race	24	1.2%
Two or more races	193	9.9%
Hispanic or Latino (of any race)	87	4.5%

=== 2010 census ===
As of the census of 2010, there were 1,984 people, 875 households, and 528 families living in the city. The population density was 1,146.8 inhabitants per square mile (442.8/km^{2}). There were 916 housing units at an average density of 529.5 units per square mile (204.4 units/km^{2}). The racial makeup of the city was 91.0% White, 0.5% African American, 3.3% Native American, 0.3% Asian, 0.2% Pacific Islander, 0.4% from other races, and 4.3% from two or more races. Hispanic or Latino of any race were 3.6% of the population.

There were 875 households, of which 29.0% had children under the age of 18 living with them, 41.7% were married couples living together, 13.6% had a female householder with no husband present, 5.0% had a male householder with no wife present, and 39.7% were non-families. 32.0% of all households were made up of individuals, and 10.3% had someone living alone who was 65 years of age or older. The average household size was 2.27 and the average family size was 2.85.

The median age in the city was 36.3 years. 22.9% of residents were under the age of 18; 9.3% were between the ages of 18 and 24; 28.6% were from 25 to 44; 26% were from 45 to 64; and 13.2% were 65 years of age or older. The gender makeup of the city was 48.7% male and 51.3% female.

=== 2000 census ===
As of the census of 2000, there were 1,642 people, 694 households, and 462 families living in the town. The population density was 1,963.8 inhabitants per square mile (758.2/km^{2}). There were 728 housing units at an average density of 870.7 units per square mile (336.2 units/km^{2}). The racial makeup of the town was 94.70% White, 0.18% African American, 3.11% Native American, 0.06% Asian, 0.55% from other races, and 1.40% from two or more races. Hispanic or Latino of any race were 1.83% of the population. 22.3% were of German, 13.8% Irish, 12.8% Norwegian, 8.2% English, 6.1% American and 6.1% French ancestry according to Census 2000.

There were 694 households, out of which 30.0% had children under the age of 18 living with them, 52.7% were married couples living together, 9.5% had a female householder with no husband present, and 33.4% were non-families. 29.8% of all households were made up of individuals, and 12.8% had someone living alone who was 65 years of age or older. The average household size was 2.37 and the average family size was 2.92.

In the town, the population was spread out, with 25.2% under the age of 18, 6.6% from 18 to 24, 29.8% from 25 to 44, 22.1% from 45 to 64, and 16.3% who were 65 years of age or older. The median age was 38 years. For every 100 females, there were 96.4 males. For every 100 females age 18 and over, there were 93.4 males.

The median income for a household in the town was $31,071, and the median income for a family was $35,455. Males had a median income of $28,472 versus $19,828 for females. The per capita income for the town was $15,893. About 7.5% of families and 8.6% of the population were below the poverty line, including 15.7% of those under age 18 and 5.5% of those age 65 or over.

== Arts and culture ==
East Helena is the location of the annual Independence Day celebration for the greater Helena area. It has been a tradition since 1957.

The East Helena Rodeo Association celebrated 60 years of rodeo competitions. The local chapter of the Veterans of Foreign Wars spearheaded the creation of the rodeo grounds and produced the first rodeo.

East Helena has a public library, a branch of the Lewis & Clark Library.

== Government ==
East Helena is a Mayor-council form of government. The elected mayor and the four elected councilmembers serve four year terms. Kelly Harris defeated two-term incumbent James Schell in the 2021 election. He ran unopposed in 2025, winning another four year term.

== Education ==
East Helena Public Schools, the unified K-12 school district for the community, educates students from pre-kindergarten to 12th grade. During the 2021–2022 school year, the district had a total of 1,739 students.

There are five public schools in the town. Eastgate Elementary School has students who are pre-kindergarten and kindergarten. Prickly Pear Elementary School has 1st and 2nd grade students. Radley Elementary School covers 3rd through 5th grade. East Valley Middle School has students from 6th grade through 8th grade. East Helena High School is 9th to 12th grade.

== Media ==
The newspaper covering news for East Helena is the Independent Record based in Helena.

Three radio stations are licensed in East Helena. KGLZ is part of Yellowstone Public Radio. KJPZ is owned by Hi-Line Radio Fellowship and broadcasts a Christian format. The AM station KKGR airs a classic hits music format.

== Infrastructure ==
US Route 12/Montana Highway 287 travels east to west through East Helena. Nearly the entire town is on the northern side of the highway. Highway 282 exits town toward the south.

East Helena is served by Helena Regional Airport.
