= KCAP =

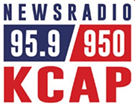
- Helena, Montana; United States
- Broadcast area: Helena, Montana
- Frequency: 950 kHz
- Branding: Newsradio 95.9/950

Programming
- Format: News/talk

Ownership
- Owner: Kevin Terry (Sale pending to Iliad Media Group); (The Montana Radio Company, LLC)
- Sister stations: KBLL; KIMO; KMTX; KMXM; KZMT

History
- First air date: November 1, 1976 (as KMTX)
- Former call signs: KMTX (1976–2014)

Technical information
- Licensing authority: FCC
- Facility ID: 8669
- Class: B
- Power: 5,000 watts
- Transmitter coordinates: 46°40′28″N 112°1′5″W

Links
- Public license information: Public file; LMS
- Webcast: Listen live
- Website: kcap.com

KCAP (950 kHz) is an AM radio station licensed to serve Helena, Montana. The station is owned by Kevin Terry, through licensee The Montana Radio Company, LLC. It airs a news/talk format.

The station went on the air November 1, 1976 as KMTX. Until 2014, the station broadcast an adult standards format as "Classy 950." In October 2014, Cherry Creek Radio announced that it would purchase KMTX from The Montana Radio Company and move its news/talk programming to KMTX from KCAP (1340 AM) and KBLL (1240 AM); those stations went off the air on November 5, the date that KMTX changed formats. The station was assigned the KCAP call letters by the Federal Communications Commission on November 6. Cherry Creek Radio's purchase of KCAP and translator K240EM was consummated on November 12, 2015, at a price of $250,004.

On April 5, 2017, Montana Radio Company announced that it would acquire Cherry Creek Media's Helena stations KCAP, KZMT, and KBLL. To comply with ownership limits, KKRK's license was divested to Yellowstone Public Radio, and KKRK's format and programming were re-located. The purchase was consummated on July 28, 2017.

== Awards ==
In June 2007, Paul Stark of KMTX was presented an E.B. Craney Broadcasting Award for excellence in Radio Station Promotion at the annual meeting of the Montana Broadcasters Association. Kevin Skaalure of KMTX won a Craney for best Radio Public Service Campaign at the same ceremony.
