= KHGC =

- Montana City, Montana; United States
- Broadcast area: Helena, Montana
- Frequency: 98.5 MHz
- Branding: Praise Live

Programming
- Format: Christian contemporary music

Ownership
- Owner: Hi-Line Radio Fellowship, Inc.
- Sister stations: KJPZ, KVCM

History
- First air date: 2008 (as KHLN)
- Former call signs: KERT (2007, CP); KHLN (2007–2011); KOYT (2011–2014)
- Call sign meaning: K Helena's Gold Country (former branding/format)

Technical information
- Licensing authority: FCC
- Facility ID: 170988
- Class: A
- ERP: 6,000 watts
- HAAT: −33 meters (−108 ft)
- Transmitter coordinates: 46°33′25.5″N 111°55′04.5″W

Links
- Public license information: Public file; LMS
- Website: https://www.kjpz.org/

KHGC (98.5 FM) is a radio station broadcasting a Christian format. Licensed to Montana City, Montana, the station is owned by Hi-Line Radio Fellowship, Inc., and broadcasts a Christian contemporary music format.

== History ==
The Federal Communications Commission issued a construction permit for the station on August 24, 2007. The station was assigned the call letters KERT on September 27, 2007 and, on October 4, 2007, changed its call sign to KHLN. The station was granted its license to cover on January 25, 2008.

On May 9, 2011, the station again changed its call sign to KOYT.

On June 9, 2014, 98.5 relaunched with a classic country format as "98.5 Helena's Gold Country", with the callsign changing at the same time to KHGC.

On January 1, 2017 KHGC changed their format to adult hits, branded as "98.5 Dave FM".

On April 5, 2017, Montana Radio Company announced that it would acquire Cherry Creek Media's Helena stations. As part of the deal, KHGC was divested to Hi-Line Radio Fellowship and switched to Your Network of Praise. The sale was completed on July 28, 2017.
