= KZMT =

- Helena, Montana; United States
- Broadcast area: Helena, Montana
- Frequency: 101.1 MHz
- Branding: Z101 FM

Programming
- Format: Classic rock
- Affiliations: United Stations Radio Networks

Ownership
- Owner: Kevin Terry (Sale pending to Iliad Media Group); (The Montana Radio Company, LLC)
- Sister stations: KBLL, KCAP, KIMO, KMXM, KMTX

History
- First air date: 1975 (as KCAP-FM); October 8, 1984 (as KZMT)
- Former call signs: KCAP-FM (1975–1984)
- Call sign meaning: K Z MonTana

Technical information
- Licensing authority: FCC
- Facility ID: 50357
- Class: C
- ERP: 95,000 watts
- HAAT: 607 meters (1,991 ft)
- Transmitter coordinates: 46°44′52″N 112°19′48″W

Links
- Public license information: Public file; LMS
- Webcast: Listen Live
- Website: z101helena.com

KZMT (101.1 FM) is a radio station licensed to serve Helena, Montana. The station is owned by Kevin Terry and licensed to the Montana Radio Company, LLC. It airs a classic rock music format.

The station was assigned the KZMT call letters by the Federal Communications Commission on October 8, 1984.

== History ==
In August 2000, a deal was reached for KZMT to be acquired by Commonwealth Communications LLC from STARadio Corp. as part of a nine-station deal with a total reported sale price of $7.5 million.

In October 2003, a deal was reached for KZMT to be acquired by Cherry Creek Radio from Commonwealth Communications LLC as part of a 24-station deal with a total reported sale price of $41 million.

In 2014, KZMT dropped the Dial Global syndicated classic rock programming in favor of locally produced programming, with the only exception being the regional syndication of Classic rock sister (Z100 Missoula) morning show The Brian & Chris Show.

On April 5, 2017, Montana Radio Company announced it would acquire Cherry Creek Media's Helena stations. The purchase was consummated on July 28, 2017.

On February 19, 2025. lliad Media announced it would acquire Montana Radio Company's stations and be under its employee stock ownership program.
