= KBLL (FM) =

- Helena, Montana; United States
- Broadcast area: Helena, Montana
- Frequency: 99.5 MHz
- Branding: 99.5 The Bull

Programming
- Format: Classic country

Ownership
- Owner: Kevin Terry (Sale pending to Iliad Media Group); (The Montana Radio Company, LLC)
- Sister stations: KIMO; KCAP; KZMT; KMXM; KMTX

History
- First air date: August 1979
- Former call signs: KBLL-FM (1978–2017)
- Call sign meaning: K BuLL

Technical information
- Licensing authority: FCC
- Facility ID: 27517
- Class: C1
- ERP: 12,500 watts
- HAAT: 589 meters (1,932 ft)
- Transmitter coordinates: 46°44′51.5″N 112°19′50.6″W

Links
- Public license information: Public file; LMS
- Webcast: Listen live
- Website: 995thebull.com

KBLL (99.5 MHz) is an FM radio station licensed to serve Helena, Montana. Owned by Kevin Terry, through licensee The Montana Radio Company, LLC, it broadcasts a classic country format branded as 99.5 The Bull.

== Ownership ==
In April 2004, a deal was reached for KBLL-FM to be acquired by Cherry Creek Radio from Holter Broadcasting Corp. (Jann Holter-Lambert, president) as part of a 2 station deal with a total reported sale price of $2.8 million.

On April 5, 2017, Montana Radio Company announced that it would acquire Cherry Creek Media's Helena stations. Following the completion of the purchase on July 28, 2017, KBLL-FM re-aligned its format to include more classic country material to differentiate it from new sister station KIMO.
