= KJPZ =

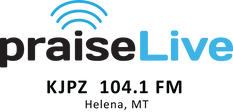
- East Helena, Montana; United States
- Frequency: 104.1 MHz
- Branding: Praise Live

Programming
- Format: Christian contemporary music

Ownership
- Owner: Hi-Line Radio Fellowship, Inc.
- Sister stations: KHGC

History
- First air date: August 22, 1988
- Former call signs: KAPM (1985–1986); KZKY (1986–1988); KHKR-FM (1988–2013); KBMI-FM (2013–2018)

Technical information
- Licensing authority: FCC
- Facility ID: 49724
- Class: C3
- ERP: 5,000 watts
- HAAT: 199 meters (653 ft)
- Transmitter coordinates: 46°46′11″N 112°1′25″W

Links
- Public license information: Public file; LMS
- Website: https://www.kjpz.org/

KJPZ (104.1 FM) is a radio station broadcasting a Christian contemporary format. Licensed to East Helena, Montana, the station is owned by Hi-Line Radio Fellowship, Inc.

== History ==
The station was assigned the call sign KAPM by the Federal Communications Commission on July 24, 1985. The station changed its call sign to KZKY on February 5, 1986, to KHKR-FM on August 22, 1988, and to KBMI-FM on July 11, 2013.

In 2014, "B104" moved from hot adult contemporary to contemporary hit radio and had a change of personnel with the addition of The Montana Mayhem with Matty D and Big T to Mornings, Katie Cruise to Middays, The Northern Light Show with Nick Northern in the PM Drive and Kramer's Big Dumb Fun Show is the night show.

On April 5, 2017, Montana Radio Company announced that it would acquire Cherry Creek Media's Helena stations. To comply with ownership limits, KBMI-FM was divested to Hi-Line Radio Fellowship, Inc., who flipped the station to a Christian contemporary format. The acquisition was consummated on July 28, 2017.

The station changed its call sign to the current KJPZ on June 18, 2018.
