= Helena, Montana =

Capital city of Montana, United States

Helena
- State capital
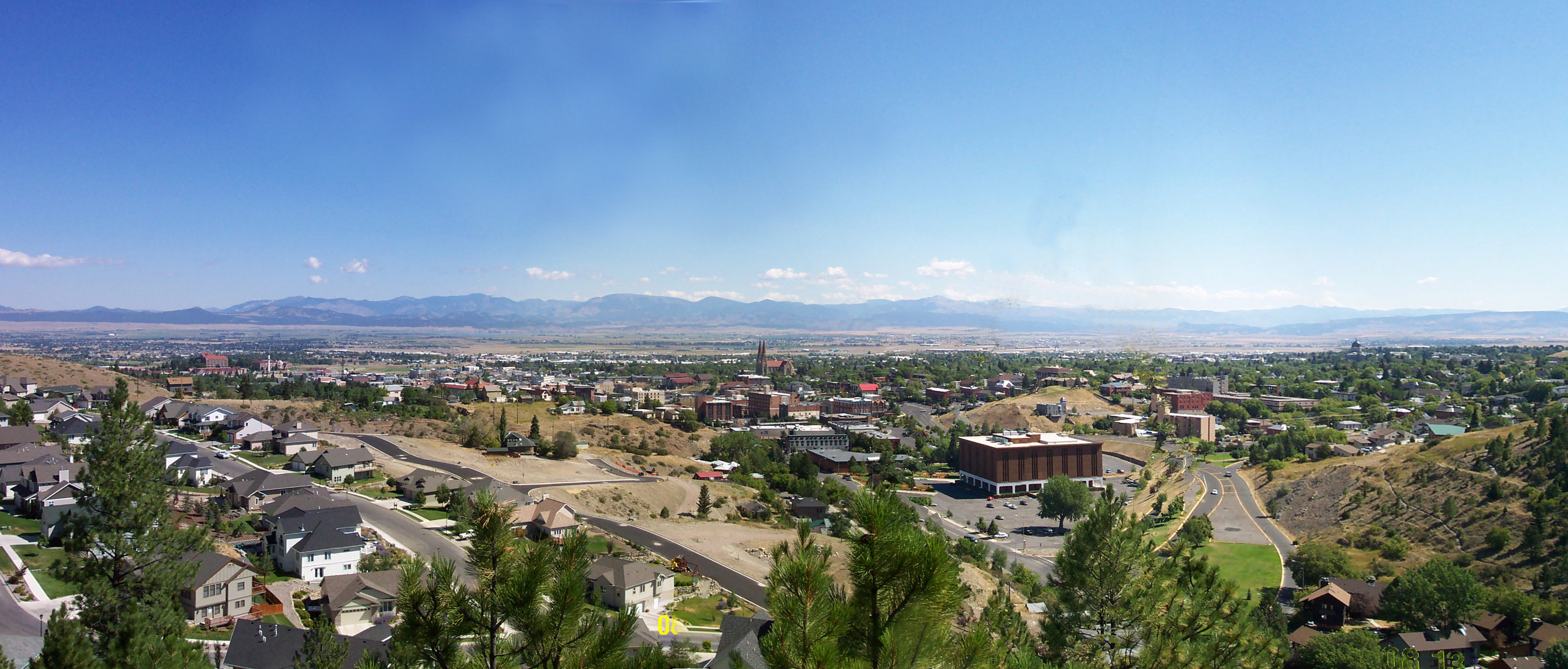
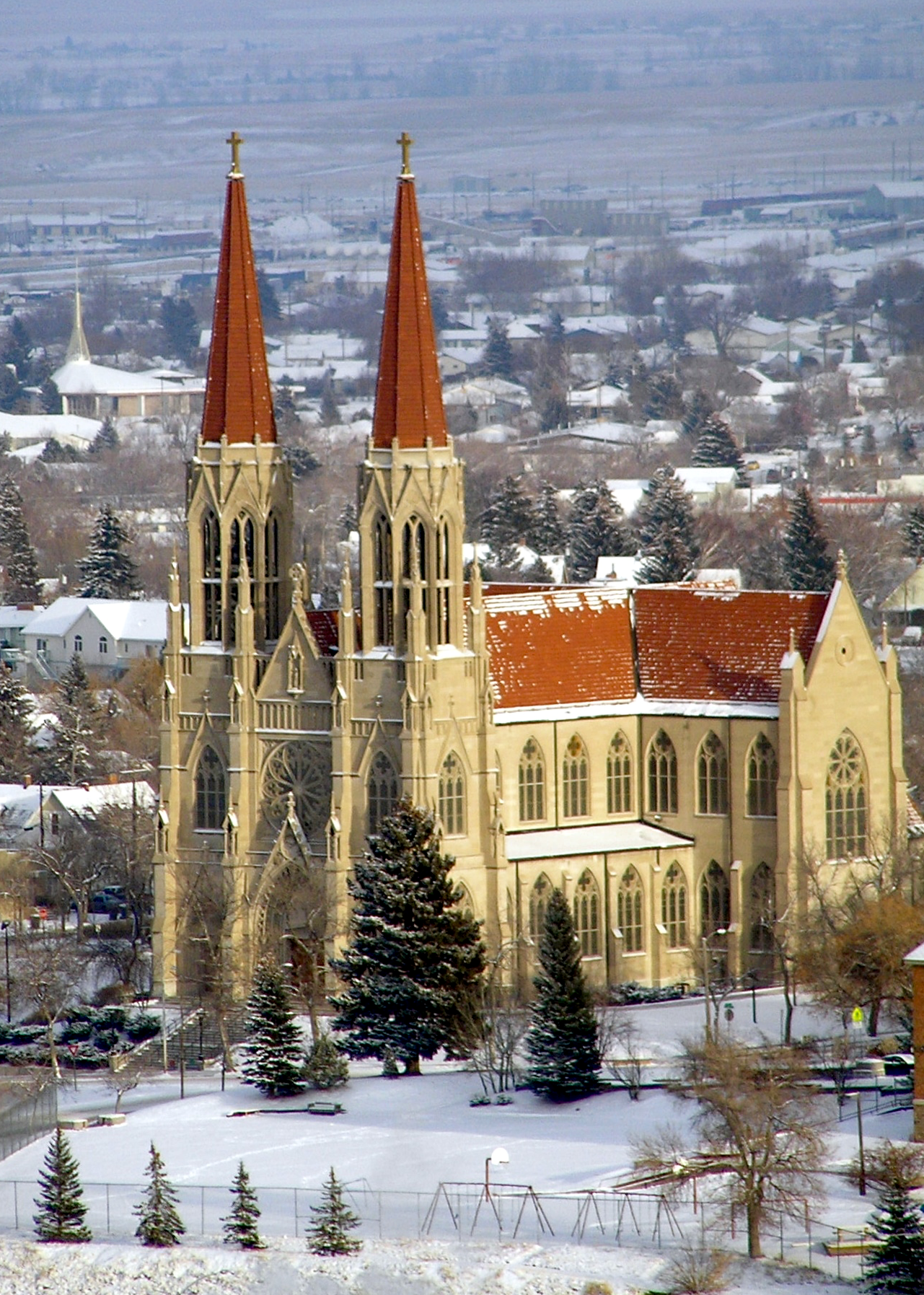
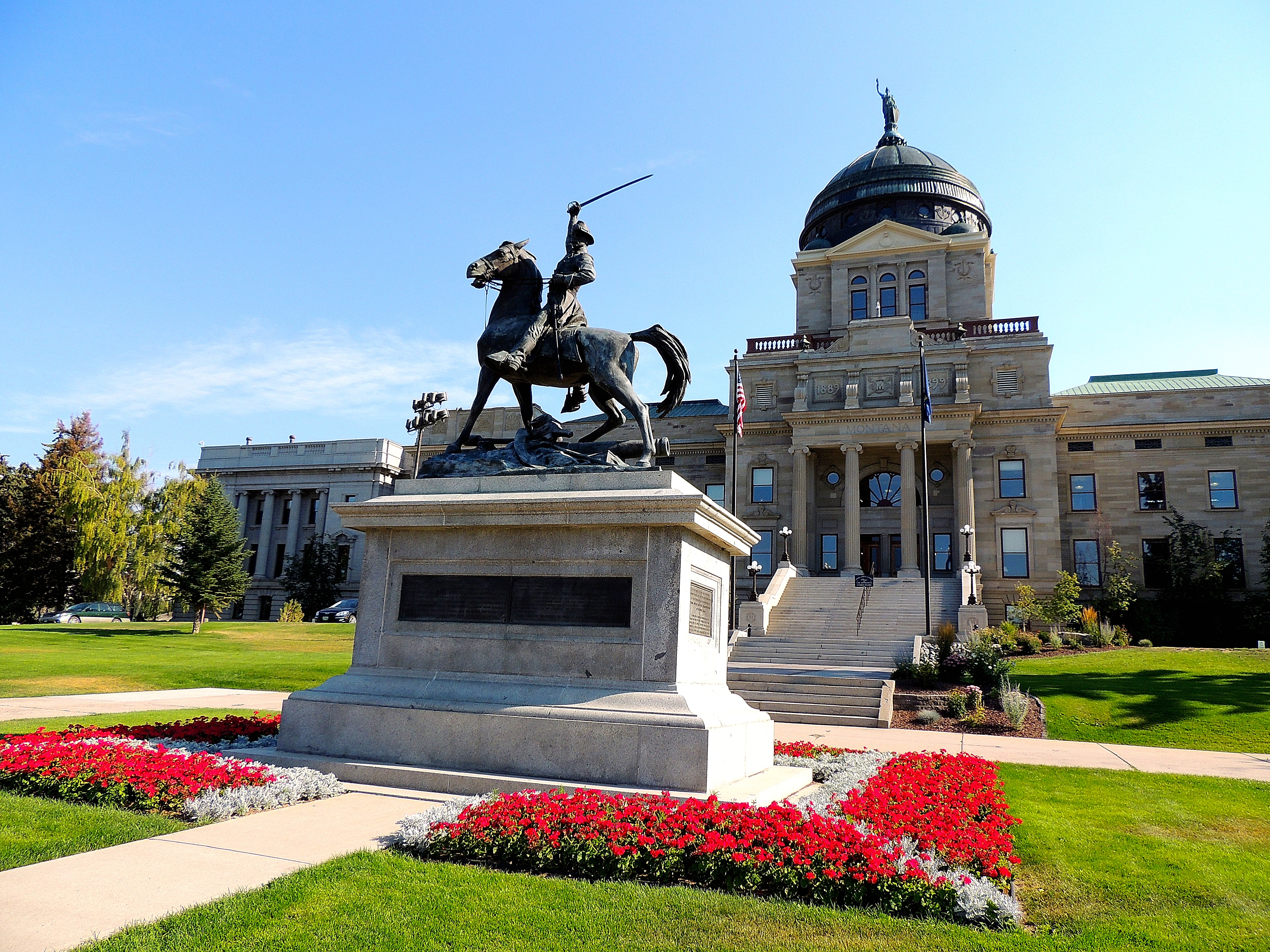
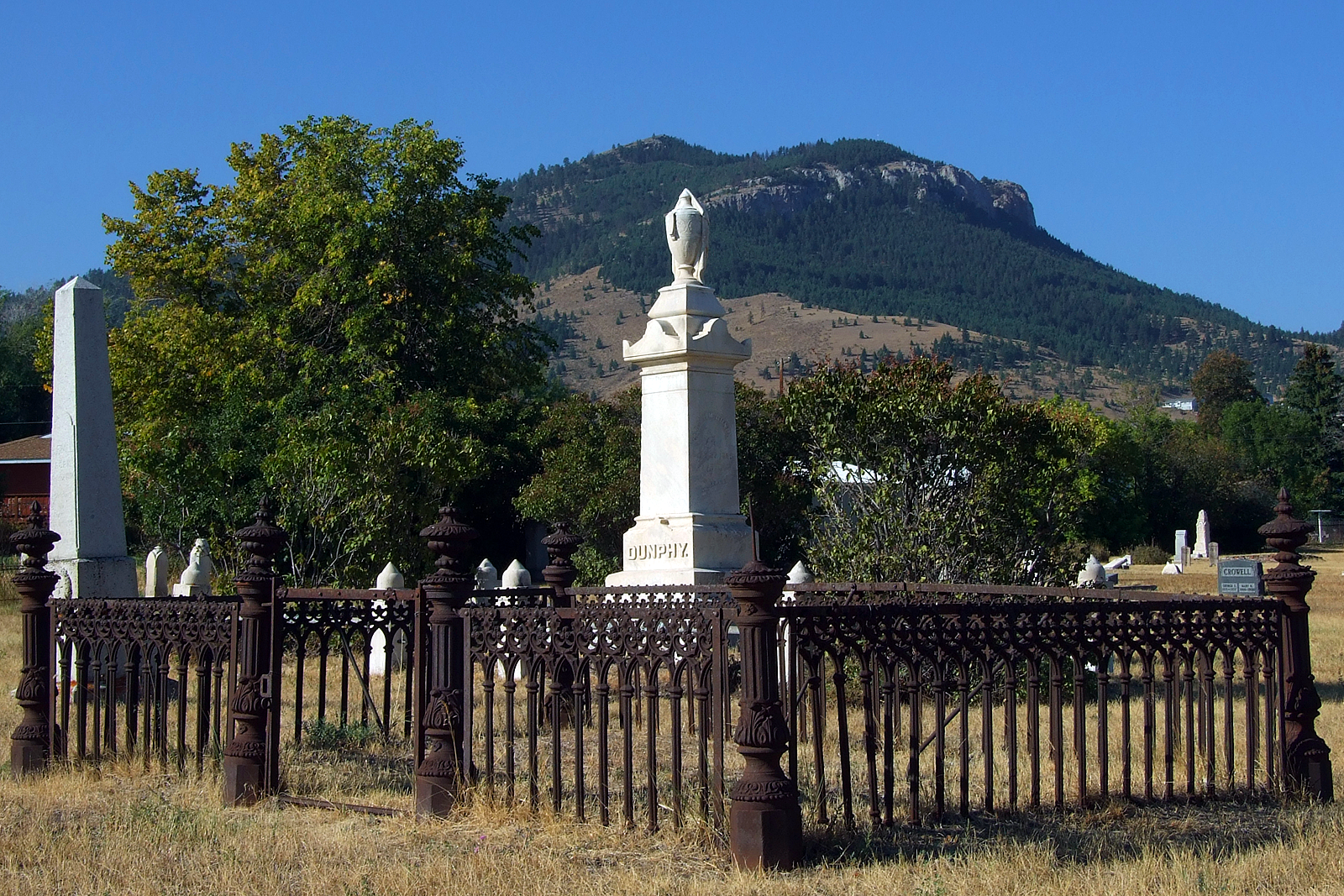
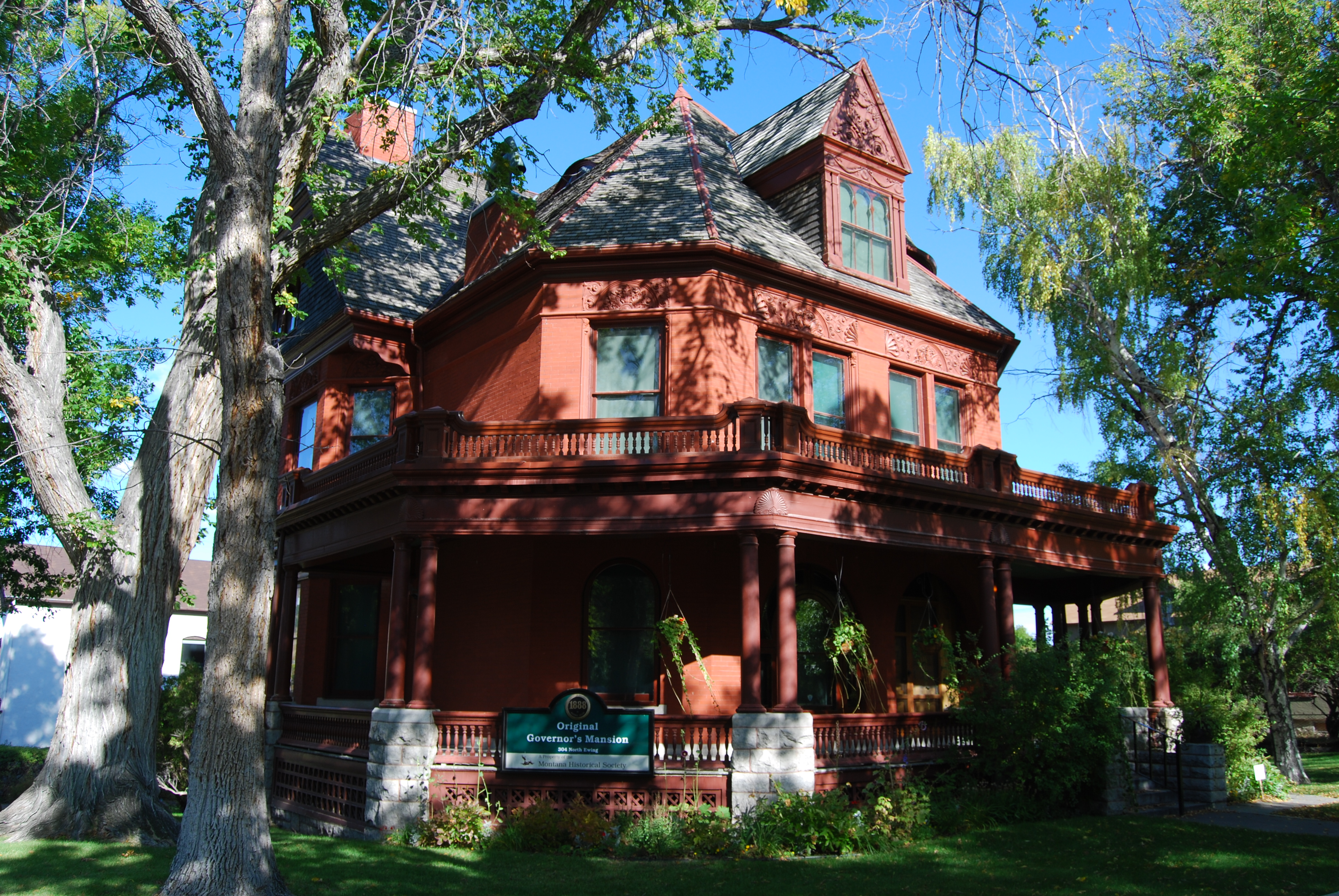
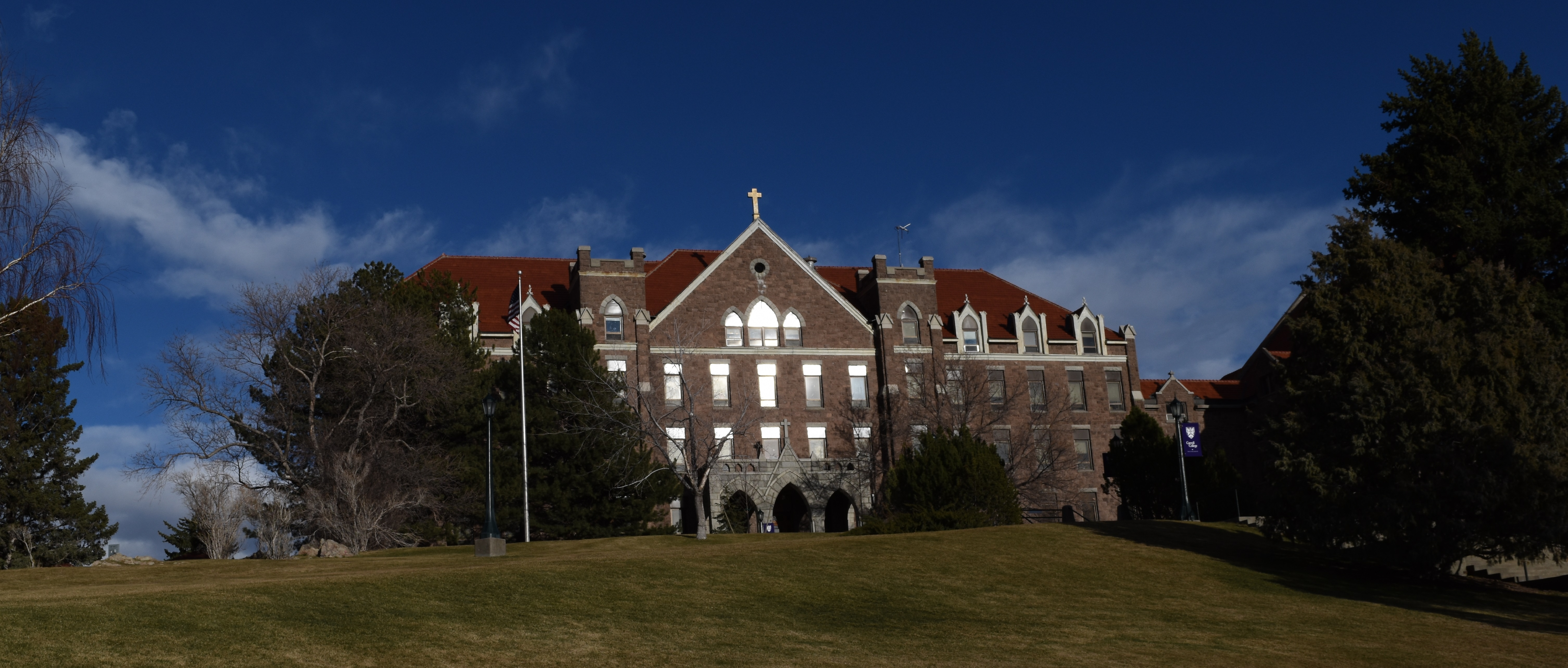
- Helena skyline Cathedral of Saint Helena Montana State Capitol Benton Avenue Cemetery Original Montana Governor's Mansion Carroll College

- Flag Seal Logo
- Nicknames: Queen City of the Rockies, The Capital City
- Interactive map of Helena
- Location within Montana Location within the United States
- Coordinates: 46°35′47″N 112°01′35″W
- Country: United States
- State: Montana
- County: Lewis and Clark
- District: MT-02
- Founded: October 30, 1864

Government
  - Type: City
  - Mayor: Emily Dean

Area
  - State capital: 16.90 sq mi (43.76 km^{2})
  - Land: 16.86 sq mi (43.67 km^{2})
  - Water: 0.039 sq mi (0.10 km^{2})
  - Urban: 11 sq mi (28 km^{2})
- Elevation: 3,996 ft (1,218 m)

Population (2020)
  - State capital: 32,091
  - Density: 1,903.4/sq mi (734.91/km^{2})
  - Metro: 83,058
- Demonym: Helenan
- Time zone: UTC−7 (Mountain)
  - Summer (DST): UTC−6 (Mountain)
- ZIP Codes: 59601–59602, 59626; 59604, 59620, 59624 (P.O. Boxes); 59623, 59625 (organizations)
- Area code: 406
- FIPS code: 30-35600
- GNIS ID: 2410734
- Waterways: Tenmile Creek
- Website: www.helenamt.gov

Helena (/ˈhɛlənə/) is the capital city of the U.S. state of Montana and the county seat of Lewis and Clark County. Its population was 32,091 at the 2020 census, making it the sixth-most populous city in Montana, but the fifth-least populous state capital in the U.S. It is the principal city of the Helena, Montana metropolitan area, which includes all of Lewis and Clark, and Jefferson counties; the MSA's population was 83,058 at the 2020 census.

Helena was founded as a gold camp during the Montana gold rush on July 14, 1864, following the discovery of gold at Last Chance Gulch by the Four Georgians. It was formally established on October 30, 1864. Due to the gold rush, Helena became a wealthy city, with approximately 50 millionaires inhabiting the area by 1888. The concentration of wealth contributed to the city's prominent, elaborate Victorian architecture. The local daily newspaper is the Independent Record. The city is served by Helena Regional Airport (HLN).

== History ==
The Helena area was long inhabited by various indigenous peoples. Evidence from the MacHaffie and Indian Creek sites on opposite sides of the Elkhorn Mountains southeast of the Helena Valley show that people of the Folsom culture lived in the area more than 10,000 years ago. Before the introduction of the horse 300 years ago, and since, other native peoples, including the Salish and the Blackfeet, visited the area seasonally on their nomadic rounds.

=== Early European settlement and gold rush ===
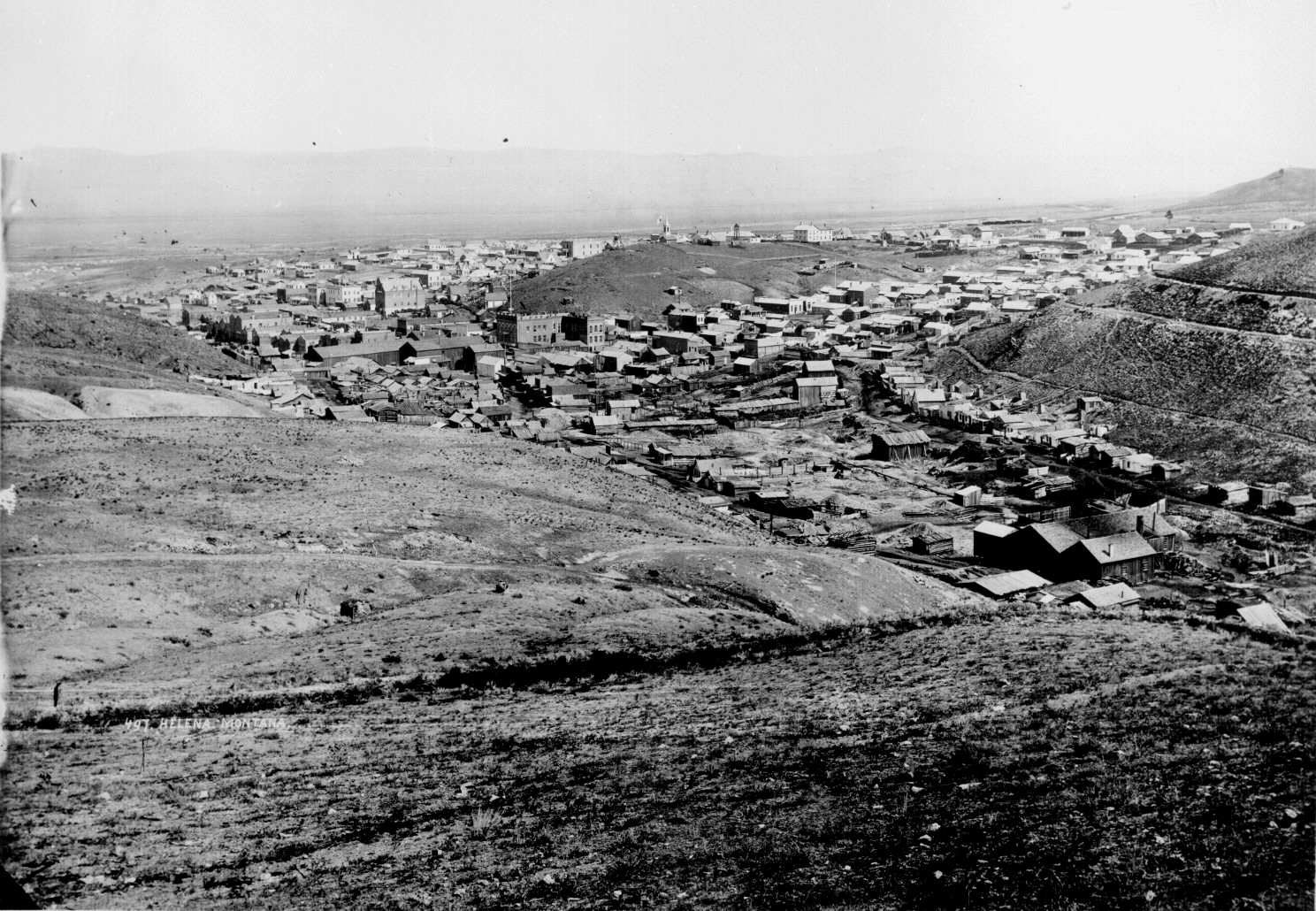
Helena in 1870

By the early 1800s, people of European descent from the United States and British Canada began arriving to work the streams of the Missouri River watershed looking for fur-bearing animals such as the beaver, undoubtedly bringing them through the area now known as the Helena Valley.

Gold strikes in Idaho Territory in the early 1860s attracted many migrants who initiated major gold rushes at Grasshopper Creek (Bannack) and Alder Gulch (Virginia City) in 1862 and 1863 respectively. So many people came that the federal government created a new territory called Montana in May 1864. The miners prospected far and wide for new placer gold discoveries. On July 14, 1864, the discovery of gold by a prospecting party known as the "Four Georgians" in a gulch off the Prickly Pear Creek led to the founding of a mining camp along a small creek in the area they called "Last Chance Gulch". In the 1870s, a Pennsylvania brick and stonemason named Louis Reeder built Reeder's Alley. It is a strong link to the beginnings of the settlement. He invested in the lots along then Cutler Street (now known as Reeder's Alley) and between 1872 and 1884 built over 30 brick and stone one-room tenements for miners. In 1876, Thomas Cruse, a prospector of Irish descent, discovered a massive gold deposit in the mountains, northwest of Helena. He soon filed a mining patent on 20.25 acres and opened the famous Drumlummon Mine which produced a rich bounty of gold and silver worth millions of dollars.

Panoramic map of Helena from 1875 with some statistics sites listed

By fall of 1864, the population had grown to over 200, and some thought the name "Last Chance" was too crass. On October 30, 1864, a group of at least seven self-appointed men met to name the town, authorize the layout of the streets, and elect commissioners. The first suggestion was "Tomah", a word the committee thought had connections to the local Indian people. Other nominations included Pumpkinville and Squashtown (as the meeting was held the day before Halloween). Other suggestions were to name the community after various Minnesota towns, such as Winona and Rochester, as a number of settlers had come from Minnesota. Finally, a Scotsman, John Summerville, proposed Helena, which he pronounced /həˈliːnə/ hə-LEE-nə, in honor of Helena Township, Scott County, Minnesota. This immediately caused an uproar from the former Confederates in the room, who insisted upon the pronunciation /ˈhɛlɪnə/ HEL-i-nə, after Helena, Arkansas, a town on the Mississippi River. While the name "Helena" won, the pronunciation varied until approximately 1882 when the /ˈhɛlɪnə/ HEL-i-nə pronunciation became dominant. Later tales of the naming of Helena claimed the name came from the island of St. Helena, where Napoleon was exiled, or was that of a miner's sweetheart.

Helena was surveyed by Captain John Wood in 1865 for the first time. The original streets of Helena followed the paths of miners, thus making the city blocks of Early Helena various sizes and shapes.

In 1870, Henry D. Washburn, having been appointed Surveyor General of Montana in 1869, organized the Washburn-Langford-Doane Expedition in Helena to explore the regions that would become Yellowstone National Park. Mount Washburn, within the park, is named for him. Members of the expedition included Helena residents:

- Truman C. Everts, former U.S. Assessor for the Montana Territory
- Cornelius Hedges, U.S. Attorney of the Montana Territory
- Samuel T. Hauser, president of the First National Bank, Helena, Montana; later a Governor of the Montana Territory
- Warren C. Gillette, Helena merchant
- Walter Trumbull, son of U.S. Senator Lyman Trumbull (Illinois)
- Nathaniel P. Langford, then former U.S. Collector of Internal Revenue for Montana Territory. Langford helped Washburn organize the expedition and later helped publicize the remarkable Yellowstone region. In May 1872 after the park was established, Langford was appointed by the Department of Interior as its first superintendent.

=== Wealth boom ===
By 1888 about 50 millionaires lived in Helena, more per capita than in any city in the world. They had made their fortunes from gold. It is estimated about $3.6 billion in today's money was extracted from Helena during this period of time. The Last Chance Placer is one of the most famous placer deposits in the western United States. Most of the production occurred before 1868. Much of the placer is now under Helena's streets and buildings.

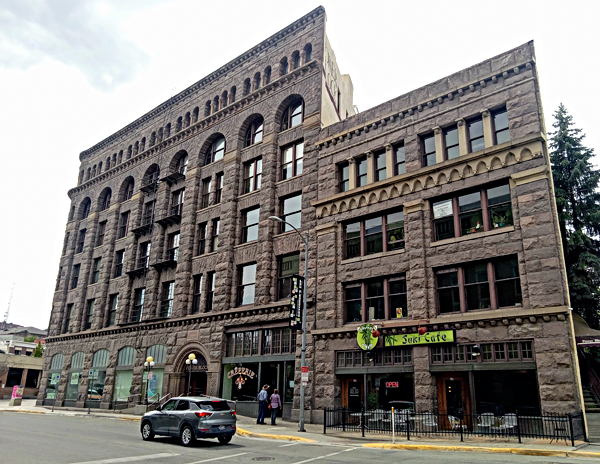
Power Block-Power Block West Helena Montana

This large concentration of wealth was the basis of developing fine residences and ambitious architecture in the city; its Victorian neighborhoods reflect the gold years. The numerous miners also attracted the development of a thriving red light district. Among the well-known local madams was Josephine "Chicago Joe" Airey, who built a thriving business empire between 1874 and 1893, becoming one of Helena's largest and most influential landowners. Helena's brothels were a successful part of the local business community well into the 20th century, ending with the 1973 death of Helena's last madam, "Big Dorothy" Baker.

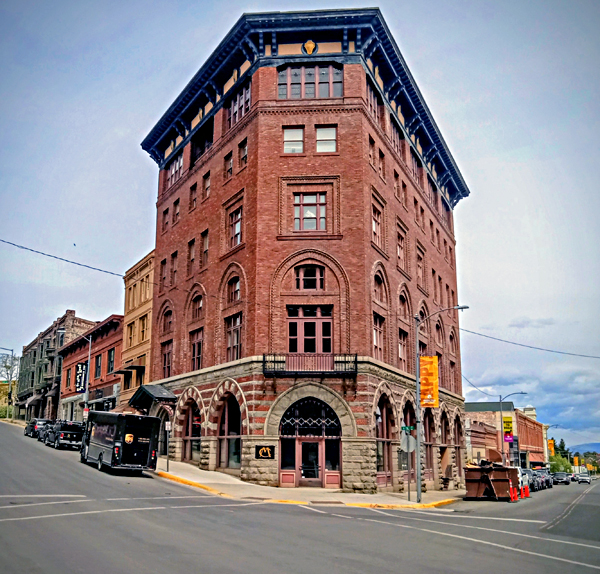
The Montana Club Helena Montana

Helena's official symbol is a drawing of "The Guardian of the Gulch", a wooden fire watch tower built in 1886. It still stands on Tower Hill overlooking the downtown district. The tower, built in 1874, replaced a series of observation buildings, the original being built in response to a series of devastating fires that swept through the early mining camp. On August 2, 2016, an arson attack severely damaged the tower and it was deemed structurally unstable. The tower is to be demolished but will be rebuilt using the same methods as in its original construction.

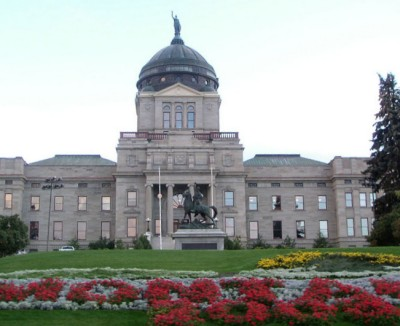
The Montana State Capitol building

In 1889, railroad magnate Charles Arthur Broadwater opened his Hotel Broadwater and Natatorium west of Helena. The Natatorium was home to the world's first indoor swimming pool. Damaged in the 1935 Helena earthquake, it closed in 1941. The property's many buildings were demolished in 1976. Today, the Broadwater Fitness Center stands just west of the Hotel & Natatorium's original location, complete with an outdoor pool heated by natural spring water running underneath it.

Helena has been the capital of Montana Territory since 1875 and the state of Montana since 1889. Referendums were held in 1892 and 1894 to determine the state's capital; the result was to keep the capitol in Helena. In 1902, the Montana State Capitol was completed. Until the 1900 census, Helena was the most populous city in the state. That year it was surpassed by Butte (with a population of 30,470), where mining industry was developing.

Among the settlers the city's prosperity attracted were Blacks fleeing racism in the South. Many found work in the mines or on the railroads and established a middle class that supported Black-owned businesses, Black churches, Black newspapers and a Black literary society. A Black police officer patrolled the town's wealthiest (white) neighborhood. But in the later 1900s new discriminatory laws, such as a ban on mixed marriages and the establishment of many sundown towns, along with the attendant racist attitudes that led to them drove many Blacks out not just Helena but the state, to the point that the city's Black population today is a small fraction of what it was in the early 20th century.

In 1916, the United Daughters of the Confederacy commissioned the construction of the Confederate Memorial Fountain in Hill Park. It was the only Confederate memorial in the Northwestern United States. The fountain was removed on August 18, 2017, after the Helena City Commission deemed it a threat to public safety following a white nationalist rally in Charlottesville, Virginia.

The Archie Bray Foundation, a ceramics center founded in 1952, is just northwest of Helena, near Spring Meadow Lake.

=== 1980s–present ===
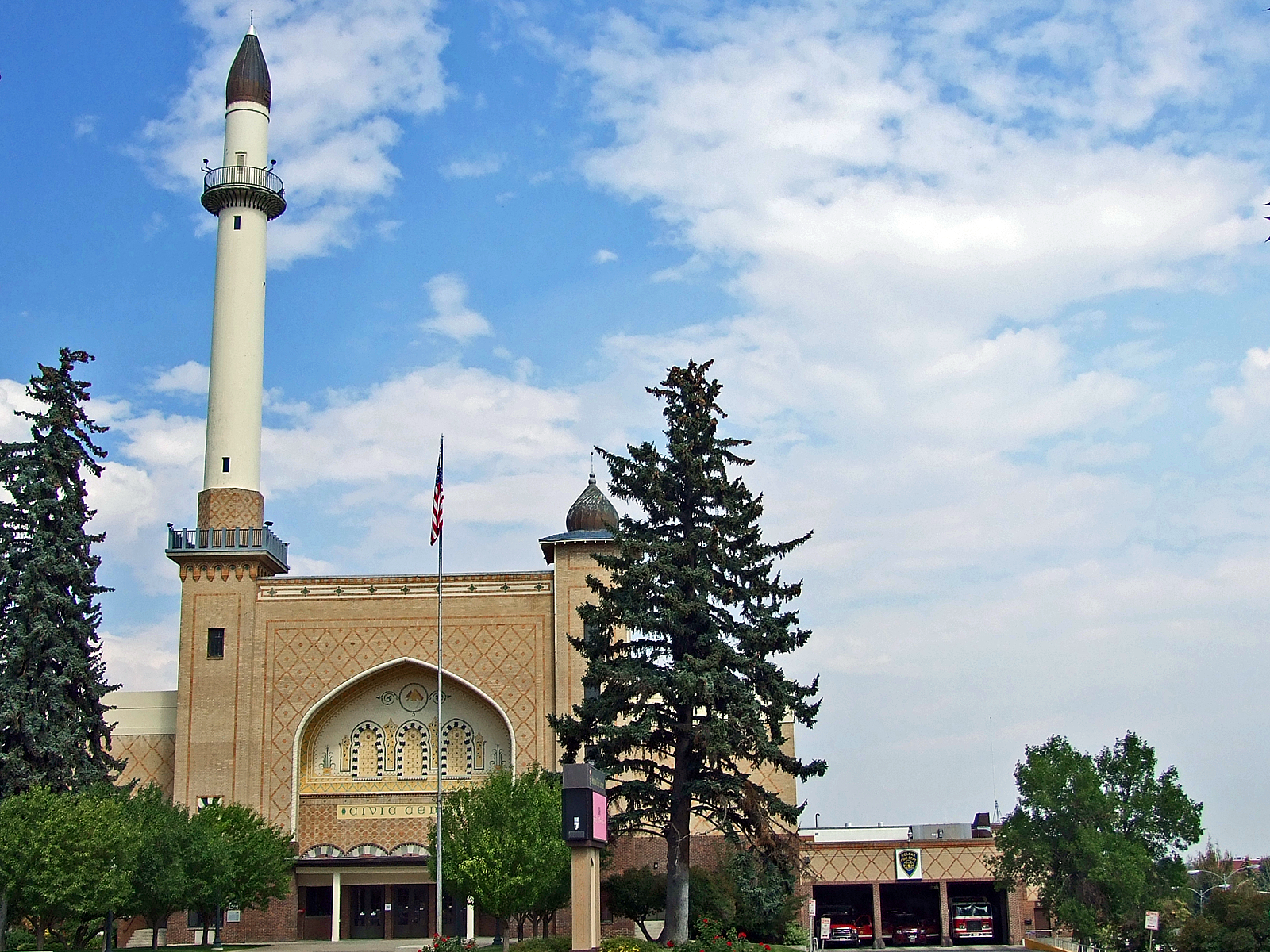
The Helena Civic Center in 2012

The Cathedral of Saint Helena and the Helena Civic Center are two of Helena's many significant historic buildings.

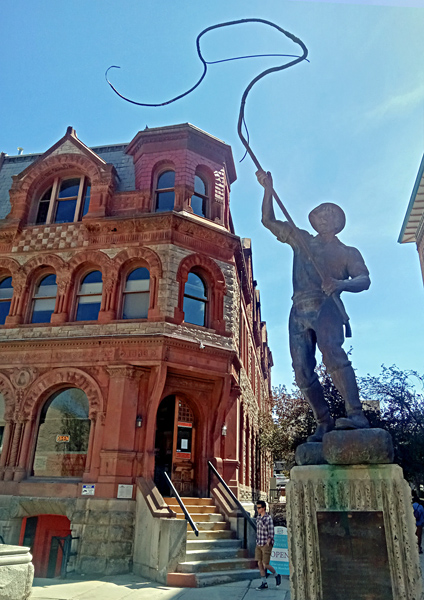
The Bullwacker John B Weaver, Montana Historical Society Museum Store, Helena

Many working Helenans (approx. 18%) work for agencies of the state government. When in Helena, most people visit the local walking mall. It was completed in the early 1980s after Urban Renewal and the Model Cities Program in the early 1970s had removed many historic buildings from the downtown district. During the next decade, a three-block shopping district was renovated that followed the original Last Chance Gulch. A small artificial stream runs along most of the walking mall to represent the underground springs that originally flowed above ground in parts of the Gulch.

In September 1983, the EPA proposed that an approximately 8.4 acre site in East Helena be listed on the Superfund National Priorities List because of a zinc and lead smelting facility had been emitting heavy metals like arsenic, lead, and cadmium into the air and soil for almost a century. Following thorough testing of soil, groundwater, and biological samples (blood, stool, and hair) from local residents, the results showed that residents of East Helena, especially children under seven, recorded significantly higher blood lead levels than those of the average Montana population. Thus, the East Helena site was officially listed in June 1984 and continues to undergo regular remediation and monitoring activities in coordination with the United States Geological Survey (USGS) and the Center for Disease Control (CDC).

A significant train wreck occurred on February 2, 1989, in which a 48-car runaway freight train slammed into a parked train near Carroll College, setting off an explosion that blasted out windows up to three miles away, causing most of the city to lose power and forcing some residents to evacuate in subzero weather.

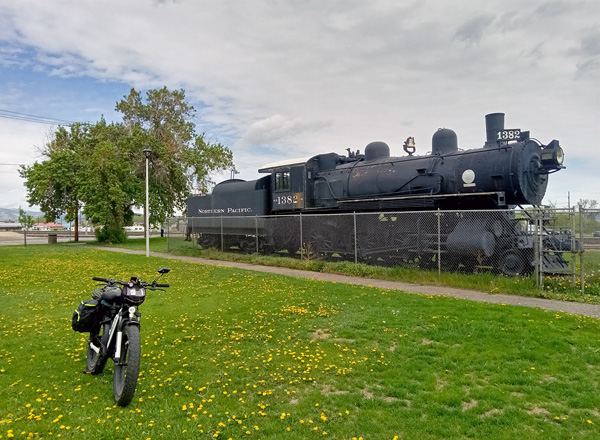
Northern Pacific Railway1382 Locomotive Helena Montana

With the mountains, Helena has much outdoor recreation, including hunting and fishing. Great Divide Ski Area is northwest of town near the ghost town of Marysville. Helena is also known for its mountain biking. It was officially designated as an International Mountain Bicycling Association bronze level Ride Center on October 23, 2013.

Helena High School and Capital High School are public high schools in Helena School District No. 1.

In 2017, Helena voters elected as mayor former Liberian refugee Wilmot Collins, who was widely reported to be Helena's first black mayor. The Independent Record reported contested research indicating that in the early 1870s one E. T. Johnson, listed in the city directory as a black barber from Washington D.C., had been elected mayor, before Helena became an incorporated town.

== Geography ==
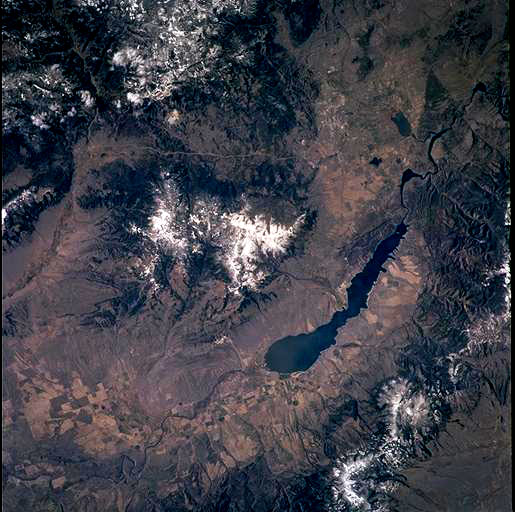
2001 astronaut photography of Helena Montana taken from the International Space Station (ISS)

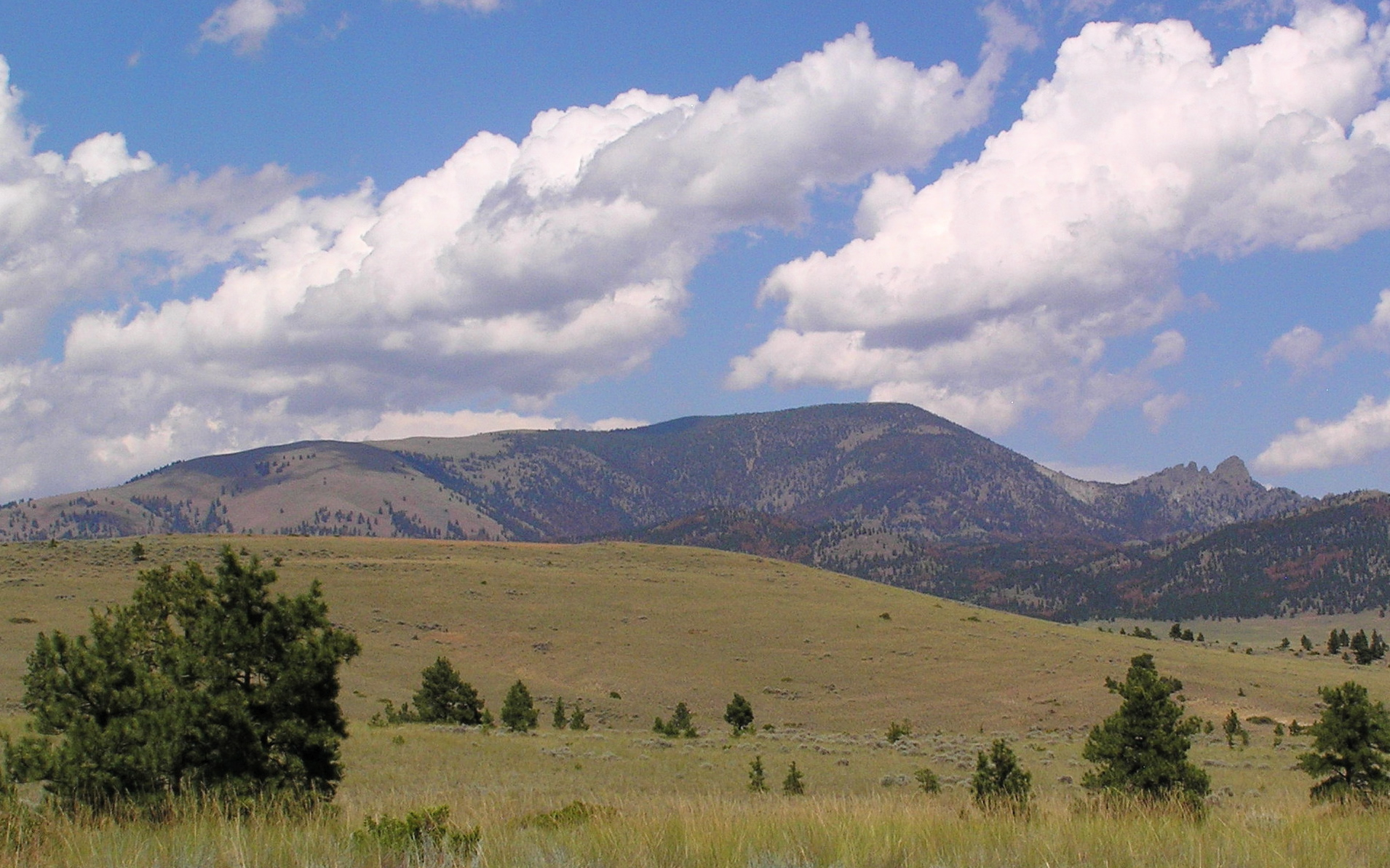
The iconic "Sleeping Giant" mountain formation located north of Helena

Surrounding features include the Continental Divide, Mount Helena City Park, Spring Meadow Lake State Park, Lake Helena, Helena National Forest, the Big Belt Mountains, the Gates of the Mountains Wilderness, Sleeping Giant Wilderness Study Area, Bob Marshall Wilderness, Scapegoat Wilderness, the Missouri River, Canyon Ferry Lake, Holter Lake, Hauser Lake, and the Elkhorn Mountains.

According to the United States Census Bureau, the city has a total area of 16.39 square miles (42.45 km^{2}), of which 16.35 square miles (42.35 km^{2}) is land and 0.04 square miles (0.10 km^{2}) is water.

=== Climate ===
Climate chart for Helena

Helena has a semi-arid climate (Köppen BSk), with long, cold and moderately snowy winters, hot and dry summers, and short springs and autumns in between. Snowfall has been observed in every month but July, but is usually absent from May to September, and normally accumulates in only light amounts. Winters have periods of moderation, partly due to warming influence from chinooks. Precipitation mostly falls in the spring and is generally sparse, averaging only 11.4 inches (290 mm) annually. The hottest temperature recorded in Helena was 105 °F (41 °C) on August 24, 1969, and July 15, 2002, while the coldest temperature recorded was −42 °F (−41 °C) on January 31, 1893, January 25, 1957, and February 2, 1996.

Climate data for Helena, Montana, 1991–2020 normals, extremes 1880–present
Month	Jan	Feb	Mar	Apr	May	Jun	Jul	Aug	Sep	Oct	Nov	Dec	Year
Record high °F (°C)	63 (17)	69 (21)	78 (26)	86 (30)	95 (35)	104 (40)	105 (41)	105 (41)	102 (39)	89 (32)	76 (24)	70 (21)	105 (41)
Mean maximum °F (°C)	53.2 (11.8)	55.6 (13.1)	66.7 (19.3)	76.6 (24.8)	84.3 (29.1)	91.9 (33.3)	98.0 (36.7)	97.1 (36.2)	91.0 (32.8)	79.0 (26.1)	63.5 (17.5)	53.0 (11.7)	99.3 (37.4)
Mean daily maximum °F (°C)	32.4 (0.2)	37.2 (2.9)	47.5 (8.6)	56.7 (13.7)	66.4 (19.1)	74.7 (23.7)	86.1 (30.1)	84.6 (29.2)	73.3 (22.9)	57.6 (14.2)	42.8 (6.0)	32.6 (0.3)	57.7 (14.3)
Daily mean °F (°C)	23.0 (−5.0)	27.2 (−2.7)	36.1 (2.3)	44.5 (6.9)	53.9 (12.2)	61.7 (16.5)	70.6 (21.4)	68.8 (20.4)	58.9 (14.9)	45.5 (7.5)	32.8 (0.4)	23.4 (−4.8)	45.5 (7.5)
Mean daily minimum °F (°C)	13.5 (−10.3)	17.2 (−8.2)	24.6 (−4.1)	32.4 (0.2)	41.5 (5.3)	48.7 (9.3)	55.1 (12.8)	52.9 (11.6)	44.6 (7.0)	33.5 (0.8)	22.8 (−5.1)	14.2 (−9.9)	33.4 (0.8)
Mean minimum °F (°C)	−12.6 (−24.8)	−5.3 (−20.7)	4.0 (−15.6)	18.4 (−7.6)	28.0 (−2.2)	37.2 (2.9)	45.7 (7.6)	42.0 (5.6)	31.0 (−0.6)	15.3 (−9.3)	1.1 (−17.2)	−8.8 (−22.7)	−19.9 (−28.8)
Record low °F (°C)	−42 (−41)	−42 (−41)	−30 (−34)	−10 (−23)	17 (−8)	30 (−1)	36 (2)	28 (−2)	6 (−14)	−8 (−22)	−39 (−39)	−40 (−40)	−42 (−41)
Average precipitation inches (mm)	0.39 (9.9)	0.42 (11)	0.52 (13)	1.02 (26)	1.95 (50)	2.21 (56)	1.06 (27)	1.04 (26)	0.96 (24)	0.78 (20)	0.59 (15)	0.46 (12)	11.40 (290)
Average snowfall inches (cm)	6.6 (17)	6.6 (17)	4.6 (12)	2.9 (7.4)	0.1 (0.25)	0.0 (0.0)	0.0 (0.0)	0.3 (0.76)	0.2 (0.51)	2.8 (7.1)	5.4 (14)	7.7 (20)	37.2 (94)
Average precipitation days (≥ 0.01 in)	6.5	6.5	6.9	8.8	11.2	11.5	7.5	6.3	5.8	7.0	6.5	6.6	91.1
Average snowy days (≥ 0.1 in)	5.6	5.6	3.7	2.1	0.2	0.1	0.0	0.1	0.0	1.5	4.0	5.2	28.1
Average relative humidity (%)	66.0	64.1	60.1	53.9	53.5	52.1	46.4	47.5	54.5	58.3	64.8	68.1	57.4
Average dew point °F (°C)	9.5 (−12.5)	15.1 (−9.4)	19.0 (−7.2)	25.3 (−3.7)	33.6 (0.9)	40.8 (4.9)	43.7 (6.5)	42.6 (5.9)	36.5 (2.5)	28.8 (−1.8)	20.3 (−6.5)	12.0 (−11.1)	27.3 (−2.6)
Mean monthly sunshine hours	119.4	149.0	225.8	243.0	282.0	308.7	370.3	324.1	254.6	202.9	118.6	99.9	2,698.3
Percentage possible sunshine	43	52	61	60	61	65	77	74	68	60	42	37	60
Source 1: NOAA (relative humidity, dew points and sun 1961–1990)
Source 2: National Weather Service

See or edit raw graph data.

== Demographics ==
Historical population
Census	Pop.	Note	%±
1870	3,106		—
1880	3,624		16.7%
1890	13,834		281.7%
1900	10,770		−22.1%
1910	12,515		16.2%
1920	12,037		−3.8%
1930	11,803		−1.9%
1940	15,056		27.6%
1950	17,581		16.8%
1960	20,227		15.1%
1970	22,730		12.4%
1980	23,938		5.3%
1990	24,569		2.6%
2000	25,780		4.9%
2010	28,190		9.3%
2020	32,091		13.8%
source: U.S. Decennial Census

=== 2020 census ===
As of the 2020 census, Helena had a population of 32,091. The median age was 39.8 years. 19.3% of residents were under the age of 18 and 20.7% of residents were 65 years of age or older. For every 100 females there were 91.4 males, and for every 100 females age 18 and over there were 89.7 males age 18 and over.

98.9% of residents lived in urban areas, while 1.1% lived in rural areas.

There were 14,924 households in Helena, of which 22.6% had children under the age of 18 living in them. Of all households, 36.2% were married-couple households, 23.1% were households with a male householder and no spouse or partner present, and 32.8% were households with a female householder and no spouse or partner present. About 40.9% of all households were made up of individuals and 16.1% had someone living alone who was 65 years of age or older.

There were 15,902 housing units, of which 6.2% were vacant. The homeowner vacancy rate was 1.5% and the rental vacancy rate was 5.3%.

Racial composition as of the 2020 census
Race	Number	Percent
White	28,266	88.1%
Black or African American	195	0.6%
American Indian and Alaska Native	658	2.1%
Asian	359	1.1%
Native Hawaiian and Other Pacific Islander	22	0.1%
Some other race	347	1.1%
Two or more races	2,244	7.0%
Hispanic or Latino (of any race)	1,277	4.0%

=== 2010 census ===
As of the census of 2010, there were 28,190 people, 12,780 households, and 6,691 families residing in the city. The population density was 1,724.2 inhabitants per square mile (665.7/km^{2}). There were 13,457 housing units at an average density of 823.1 units per square mile (317.8 units/km^{2}). The racial makeup of the city was 93.3% White, 0.4% African American, 2.3% Native American, 0.7% Asian, 0.1% Pacific Islander, 0.6% from other races, and 2.6% from two or more races. Hispanic or Latino of any race were 2.8% of the population.

There were 12,780 households, of which 24.3% had children under the age of 18 living with them, 38.2% were married couples living together, 10.6% had a female householder with no husband present, 3.6% had a male householder with no wife present, and 47.6% were non-families. 39.8% of all households were made up of individuals, and 13.5% had someone living alone who was 65 years of age or older. The average household size was 2.07 and the average family size was 2.77.

The median age in the city was 40.3 years. 20.1% of residents were under the age of 18; 11.6% were between the ages of 18 and 24; 23.3% were from 25 to 44; 29.5% were from 45 to 64; and 15.6% were 65 years of age or older. The gender makeup of the city was 48.0% male and 52.0% female.

=== 2000 census ===
As of the census of 2000, there were 25,780 people, 11,541 households, and 6,474 families residing in the city. The population density was 1,840.7 people per square mile (710.7 people/km^{2}). There were 12,133 housing units at an average density of 866.3 units per square mile (334.5 units/km^{2}). The ethnic makeup of the city is 94.8% White, 0.2% African American, 2.1% Native American, 0.8% Asian, 0.1% Pacific Islander, 0.4% from other races, and 1.7% from two or more races. 1.7% of the population were Hispanic or Latino of any race.

There were 11,541 households, out of which 27.1% had children under the age of 18 living with them, 42.5% were married couples living together, 10.4% had a female householder with no husband present, and 43.9% were non-families. 37.5% of all households were made up of individuals, and 11.3% had someone living alone who was 65 years of age or older. The average household size was 2.14 and the average family size was 2.83.

In the city, the population was spread out, with 22.4% under the age of 18, 11.1% from 18 to 24, 26.6% from 25 to 44, 26.0% from 45 to 64, and 13.9% who were 65 years of age or older. The median age was 39 years. For every 100 females, there were 91.0 males. For every 100 females age 18 and over, there were 87.6 males.

The median income for a household in the city was $34,416, and the median income for a family was $50,018. Males had a median income of $34,357 versus $25,821 for females. The per capita income for the city was $20,020. About 9.3% of families and 14.5% of the population were below the poverty line, including 16.4% of those under age 18 and 8.3% of those age 65 or over.

== Economy ==
Helena has a long record of economic stability with its history as being the state capital and being founded in an area rich in silver and lead deposits. However, this situation has resulted in a slow growing economy. Its status as capital makes it a major hub of activity at the county, state, and federal level. According to the Helena Area Chamber of Commerce, the capital's median household income is $50,889, and its unemployment rate stood at 3.8% in 2013, about 1.2% lower than the rest of the state. Education is a major employer, with two high schools and accompanying elementary and middle schools for K–12 students as well as Helena College. Major private employers within the city of Helena include Carroll College and the medical community.

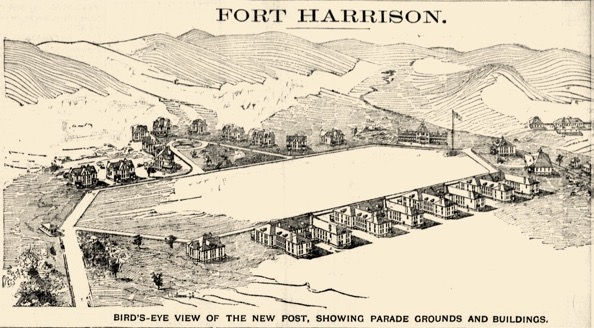
Fort Harrison (pictured in 1894) has been an economic stabilizer of Helena since it was first built.

Helena's economy is also bolstered by Fort William Henry Harrison, the training facility for the Montana National Guard, located just outside the city. Fort Harrison is also home to Fort Harrison VA Medical Center, where many Helena-area residents work.

== Education ==
=== Higher education ===
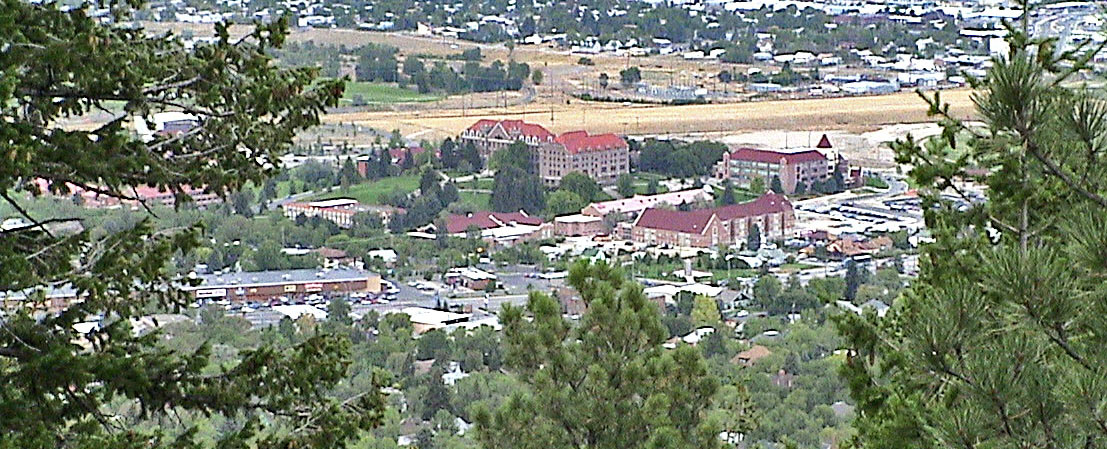
Carroll College, viewed from Mount Helena

- Carroll College, a Catholic liberal arts college, which opened in 1909, enrolls around 1,500 students.
- Helena College University of Montana, a two-year affiliate campus of The University of Montana, provides skilled trades and technology degrees as well as general education requirements. It opened in 1939.

=== Primary and secondary education ===
Several school districts provide public education from pre-kindergarten to 12th grade.

The Helena Public School District has two components: Helena Elementary School District and Helena High School District. Almost all of Helena is in Helena Elementary School District and Helena High School District. A small portion extends into East Helena K-12 Schools

The Helena Elementary School District consists of 13 schools covering students from pre-kindergarten to 8th grade. There were 5,181 students enrolled in the district during the 2021–2022 school year.

The Helena High School District has two schools for students in 9th through 12th grade. Helena High School had 1,128 students enrolled for the 2021–2022 school year while Capital High School had 1,350.

=== Library ===
Helena's public library is the main branch of the Lewis & Clark Library. Branches are also in Augusta, East Helena, and Lincoln.

== Government ==
Helena has a mayor and four city commissioners. They each are elected to four year terms.

== Media ==
Helena's Designated Market Area is 205th in size, as defined by Nielsen Media Research, and is the fifth smallest media market in the nation.

- Newspapers
  - Independent Record (daily, morning)
- Online news
  - Montana Free Press (statewide news source)
- AM radio
  - KKGR 680 (Oldies), KGR, LLC
  - KCAP 950 (Talk), Cherry Creek Radio
  - KROL 1430 (Classic Hits)
- FM radio
  - KUHM 91.7 (National Public Radio), Montana NPR
  - KQRV 96.9 (Country), Butte Broadcasting Incorporated
  - KHGC 98.5 (Adult Contemporary), Cherry Creek Radio
  - KBLL 99.5 (Country), Cherry Creek Radio
  - KZMT 101.1 (Classic rock), Cherry Creek Radio
  - KMXM 102.3 (Adult Contemporary), The Montana Radio Company, LLC
  - KJPZ 104.1 (Christian), Hi-Line Radio Fellowship
  - KMTX 105.3 (Adult Contemporary)
- Television
  - KXLH-LD (CBS/MTN, channel 9)
  - KUHM-TV (PBS, channel 10)
  - KTVH-DT (NBC/Independent, channel 12)
  - KHBB-LD (ABC/Fox, channel 21)

== Notable people ==
- Josephine Airey, madam and landowner
- Stephen Ambrose, historian, author of Band of Brothers and Undaunted Courage
- Dorothy Baker, madam
- Max Baucus, former U.S. senator from Montana (1978-2014), and former U.S. Ambassador to China (2014-2017)
- James Presley Ball, African-American daguerreotypist
- Jean Baucus, historian, author, and rancher
- Samuel Beall, Lieutenant Governor of Wisconsin
- Vice Admiral Donald Bradford Beary (1888–1966) (U.S. Navy), implemented Sea Replenishment during World War II
- Patricia Belcher, actress
- Dirk Benedict, actor (The A-Team)
- Brand Blanshard, philosopher
- H. Kim Bottomly, former president of Wellesley College
- Isaac Brock, lead singer of Modest Mouse
- Mary Caferro, Montana state senator
- Thomas Henry Carter, United States senator from Montana
- Lane Chandler, actor
- William H. Clagett, congressman from Montana Territory
- Liz Claiborne, fashion designer
- Wilmot Collins, first black mayor in Montana since statehood
- Kevin Michael Connolly, photographer
- Mike Cooney, Montana state senator and former Montana Secretary of State
- Gary Cooper, actor
- Margaret Craven, author
- Charles Donnelly, president of the Northern Pacific Railway
- Pat Donovan, Dallas Cowboys offensive tackle
- Troy Downing, U.S. representative, former Montana State Auditor
- James Earp, saloonkeeper and brother of Wyatt Earp
- Truman C. Everts, Assessor of Internal Revenue for the Montana Territory between July 15, 1864, and February 16, 1870
- Casey FitzSimmons, tight end with the Detroit Lions
- Cory Fong, Tax Commissioner of North Dakota
- John Gagliardi, College Football Hall of Fame coach
- Claude Gordon, American trumpet player.
- Pat Gray, Host of Pat Gray Unleashed
- Tyler Knott Gregson, poet and author
- Russell Benjamin Harrison, son of President Benjamin Harrison and Indiana politician
- Susie Hedalen, 18th Montana superintendent of public instruction
- Rick Hill, congressman from Montana
- Norman Holter, biophysicist and inventor of the Holter monitor
- Esther Howard, actress
- Laura E. Howey, educator, librarian, and social reformer
- L. Ron Hubbard, author and founder of Scientology
- Chuck Hunter, Montana state senator
- Hal Jacobson, member of Montana House of Representatives representing District 82
- Christine Kaufmann, Montana state senator
- Brian Knight, Major League Baseball umpire
- Nathaniel P. Langford, first superintendent of Yellowstone National Park
- Nicolette Larson (1952-97), singer
- Dave Lewis, Montana state senator
- James F. Lloyd, congressman from California
- Stuart Long, priest
- Myrna Loy, actress
- Martin Maginnis, congressman from Montana Territory
- Tony Markellis, bassist and record producer
- Thomas Francis Meagher, Irish rebel, US Civil War brigadier general, Acting Governor of the Territory of Montana
- Dave Meier, Major League Baseball outfielder
- Colin Meloy, lead singer and songwriter of The Decemberists
- Maile Meloy, writer
- Dale L. Mortensen, member of Montana House of Representatives representing District 44
- James C. Morton, actor
- Luke Muszkiewicz, state legislator
- Sean O'Malley, MMA fighter
- Bobby Petrino, head football coach at Missouri State University
- Paul Petrino, head football coach at the University of Idaho
- Charley Pride, country music singer
- Glenn Roush, Montana state legislator
- Henry H. Schwartz, chief of the U.S. General Land Office and U.S. senator from Wyoming
- Leo Seltzer, creator of roller derby
- Vida Ravenscroft Sutton, playwright and radio professional
- George G. Symes, congressman from Colorado
- Robert "Dink" Templeton, Olympic gold medalist in rugby
- Decius Wade, the "Father of Montana Jurisprudence"
- Thomas J. Walsh, U.S. senator from Montana
- Henry D. Washburn, Surveyor General, Montana Territory, and commander of the Washburn-Langford-Doane Expedition to Yellowstone in 1870
- William F. Wheeler, U.S. Marshal, Civil War officer, Minnesota territorial Librarian and secretary to two governors, and founder of the Montana Historical Society, first in the West
- John Patrick Williams, former congressman from Montana
- Belle Fligelman Winestine, writer and suffragist
- Molly Wood, executive editor at CNET.com
- Lt. General Samuel Baldwin Marks Young (U.S. Army), former Acting Superintendent of Yellowstone National Park

== See also ==
- Capital City Mall (Montana)
- USS Helena, five ships
