= Mass media in Missoula, Montana =

Since its incorporation in 1885, Missoula, Montana has been one of the primary media markets in the state of Montana, beginning with the weekly newspaper the Missoula and Cedar Creek Pioneer. The Missoula single-broadcast over-air television media market has been the largest in Montana (#166 nationally) since 2002. Though Billings is the largest city in Montana, Missoula's single-broadcast over-air television media market includes Missoula, Ravalli, Granite, Mineral, Lake, Flathead, and Sanders and serves over 113,000 television homes (2011). Missoula is also home to the state's third largest daily newspaper, the Missoulian, and the state's largest alternative weekly, the Missoula Independent.

== Newspapers ==
=== History ===
Missoula's newspaper history dates back to 1870 when The Missoula and Cedar Creek Pioneer was first published by Magee Brothers and Morrison. Originally called simply the Cedar Creek Pioneer after the gold rush settlement where it was founded before moving to Missoula, the newspaper's name went through several variations after the Cedar Creek mines in Mineral County appeared to be completely exploited. In a little more than two years the name changed from The Missoula & Cedar Creek Pioneer (Sept. 1870 - Jan. 1871), to the Missoula Pioneer (Jan. - Nov. 1871), to The Pioneer (Nov. 1871 - Nov. 1872), to The Montana Pioneer (Dec. 1872 - Feb. 1873), before finally becoming the Weekly Missoulian in February 1873. By 1894 the Missoulian had both a daily and an evening edition. Today, The Missoulian remains as Missoula's only daily newspaper.

In the late 19th and early 20th century, numerous newspapers sprang up in Missoula, ranging from The Baptist Mountaineer to The Montana Fruit Grower to The Missoula Socialist, but few lasted longer than a couple of years, and sometimes only a few issues, before going out of business, changing their names, or being absorbed by other newspapers. Two notable exceptions were the Missoula Sentinel (1911–1967) and the Missoula County Times (1931–1968).

The Missoula Sentinel was a Democratic daily newspaper that rivaled the Republican Missoulian owned by progressive Republican Senator Joseph M. Dixon. Founded in 1911, the newspaper was soon purchased by Richard Kilroy (1912), a former editor of Butte's Reveille and a fervent Democrat with political ambitions. The Sentinel launched a smear campaign against Dixon (who was up for reelection), and the two engaged in tit-for-tat hyperbole which ended with Dixon winning both Missoula and Ravalli Counties but ultimately losing the election in a 1912 Democratic sweep.

Shortly after losing the 1912 election, Dixon purchased the Sentinel, not so much for political reasons but because he did not believe there were enough advertising dollars in Missoula to support two daily newspapers. Indeed, he kept the Sentinel as a Democratic newspaper. However, Dixon soon faced the wrath of the powerful Anaconda Copper Mining Company (known simply as "The Company") that controlled much of Montana's politics and media at the time. Both papers were sold to Chicago newspapermen in 1917 and new editor Martin J. Hutchens came under The company's influence. In 1926, both papers were purchased by the previous editor of the Anaconda Standard (The company's newspaper) and would remain under the company's control until they were sold to Lee Enterprises in 1959. The Sentinel was ultimately discontinued in 1967.

The Missoula County Times was a weekly newspaper founded by Charles Doherty in 1931. It bore no relation to a newspaper of the same name published from 1883 to 1888 which was later absorbed into the Missoulian. The name was later changed to the Missoula Times in 1947. Doherty operated the newspaper until his death in 1958. The newspaper was then purchased, along with the Sentinel and Missoulian by Lee Enterprises. The paper ended publication in 1968.

=== The Missoulian ===
The Missoulian' roots are based in Missoula's first newspaper, the Missoula and Cedar Creek Pioneer, founded in 1870, and was devoted to reporting on the development of Western Montana. In 1873, Judge Frank Woody, who would later become Missoula's first mayor, purchased the paper and changed its name to the Missoulian. The newspaper would offer only a weekend edition until 1891, when new owner A.B. Hammond converted it to a daily newspaper as Missoula's population passed 3,000. In December 1906 Wilhelm's magazine The Coast described the newspaper as "one of the best papers in the state of Montana and has the credit of being a strong paper in all matters pertaining to public and state affairs. It is large, well edited and a credit to Missoula."

In 1900, Hammond began selling stock in the Missoulian to political rival Joseph M. Dixon, who would later become a US Congressman, and the state of Montana's seventh governor. Dixon gained control over the paper in 1907 and brought in Arthur Stone, a former Anaconda Standard reporter and managing editor as well as former Democratic state legislator, as editor. His experience would help modernize the paper and expand its reach. The Republican Daily Missoulian (as it would be called until 1961) was soon rivaled by the Democrat-leaning Missoula Herald published by the Hassler Brothers and its successor the Missoula Sentinel that was purchased in 1912 (one year after its founding) by Richard Kilroy for the purpose of politically wounding Dixon as he ran for re-election in the first year Senators were popularly elected. (*note: Though the 17th Amendment to the Constitution was not ratified until 1913, the Montana legislature provided for the direct election of US Senators in 1911 in anticipation of the amendment's ratification.) Dixon would lose the election in a Democratic sweep and would lose the paper for financial reasons five years later.

Montana's press in 1912 was almost entirely under the influence and control of the Anaconda Copper Mining Company, then known as "Amalgamated Copper Company" or, in a nod to its incredible clout in Montana politics and journalism, simply "The Company". The Missoulian was not a "Company paper"; according to Jerre Murphy, a former Amalgamated employee turned muckraker it was the only major newspaper in Montana that was not. After his election defeat Dixon turned the Missoulian against Amalgamated with scathing editorials and "objectionable" news. With Dixon refusing to sell the paper, the Company chose bribery by offering Dixon the Missoula Sentinel that Dixon felt was splitting the city's advertising dollars. Dixon accepted, but only on the condition that he would be "fair" to Amalgamated in the press. Pressure on advertisers for new anti-Dixon competition and Amalgamated itself pulling its advertising dollars as well as having the Milwaukee Road cancel complimentary papers that it had given to passengers, however, forced Dixon to sell. In two newspapermen from the Chicago Journal, Martin Hutchens and Lester L. Jones purchased the Missoulian and was soon part of the "copper press" (i.e. a "Company paper" known for using its pages to promote the company's views and for suppressing news it did not want reported) and would remain as such until Anaconda Copper sold all its Montana newspapers to Lee Enterprises in 1959.

=== Other newspapers ===
Other newspapers in Missoula include the alternative weekly Missoula Independent, a member of the Association of Alternative Newsweeklies, founded in 1991, and The Montana Kaimin from the University of Montana, founded in 1898. In 2005, the electronic-only New West (website) was founded as a left-leaning "next-generation media company" that focused on culture, environment, economy, and politics in the Rocky Mountain West. The paper has further developed editions in Bozeman, Montana and Boise, Idaho.

== Broadcast Media ==
Missoula is home to 4 AM radio stations and 17 FM stations as well as 4 primary television channels.

=== History ===
Missoula's first radio station, KGVO (Great Valley of Ours) was launched January 18, 1931, by Arthur James Mosby, who had moved to Missoula in 1922 and constructed a transmitter from a diagram and parts list in an amateur radio magazine. With the station, Mosby is credited as being instrumental in bringing the CBS Radio Network to Montana.

In 1941 Mosby hired future national radio broadcaster Paul Harvey. Harvey enjoyed Missoula, and it is here that he developed his unique style of highlighting the softer side of news. He and Mosby quickly became and remained friends until Mosby's death in 1970, with Harvey giving an on-air birthday wish for Mosby's 80th birthday and short eulogy after his death two years later. However, in the summer of 1941 Mosby called Harvey into his office to offer him a job in the sales department because, according to Mosby, Harvey was a great salesman but had a "silly and funny sounding voice" that couldn't be taken seriously enough for him to be reporting the news. Harvey would not take the offer and would leave Missoula, but he would oddly credit Mosby for pushing him up through his career by kicking him out.

In the summer of 1954, KGVO-TV, also owned by Mosby, became Missoula's first television station. Programming began at only four hours a day, and the station carried programming from the three broadcast networks though the station was a primary CBS affiliate given its relationship with its sister radio station KGVO. The station would briefly become KMSO-TV in 1957 but would revert to KGVO-TV in 1964 and would use the call letters until 1978 when the station became the current NBC affiliate KECI-TV. Missoula's second station, KPAX-TV, began as a satellite station from Butte in 1970 before becoming a full-fledged broadcaster in 1977. KPAX was started by Joseph Sample to join his Montana Television Network with the intention of uniting Montana's diverse areas while grouping them together for the national advertising market. KPAX acted as a CBS-ABC affiliate until KTMF came online in 1991 as the ABC affiliate. Missoula's FOX affiliate KMMF opened in 2002 but was shut down on June 12, 2009, when analog broadcasting ended. Montana PBS, KUSM-TV, signed on for the first time on October 1, 1984, making Montana the last state to have its own PBS station.

=== Television ===
- 8 KPAX-TV Missoula (CBS/MTN, Independent on 8.2)
- 11 KUFM-TV Missoula (Montana PBS/PBS)
- 13 KECI-TV Missoula (NBC)
- 23 KTMF Missoula (ABC, Fox with MyNetworkTV on 23.2)

=== AM ===
- 930 KMPT East Missoula (Talk radio)
- 1290 KGVO Missoula (Talk radio)
- 1340 KYLT Missoula (Talk radio)
- 1450 KGRZ Missoula (Sports radio)

=== FM ===
- 88.3 KJCG Missoula (Your Network of Praise)
- 89.1 KUFM-FM Missoula (Montana Public Radio/NPR)
- 89.9 KBGA Missoula (College/free-form/University of Montana)
- 93.3 KGGL Missoula (Country music)
- 94.9 KYSS-FM Missoula (Country music)
- 96.3 KBAZ Hamilton (Mainstream rock)
- 97.9 KDXT Lolo (Country)
- 98.7 KHKM Hamilton (Oldies)
- 98.7 KXDR Pinesdale (Contemporary hit radio)
- 100.1 KZOQ-FM Missoula (Classic rock)
- 101.5 KFGM-FM Frenchtown (Community radio)
- 102.5 KMSO Missoula (Adult Top 40)
- 103.3 KDTR Florence (Adult album alternative)
- 104.5 KKVU Stevensville (Adult Top 40)
- 105.9 KYJK Missoula (Adult hits)
- 107.5 KENR Superior (Contemporary hit radio)
