= KGVO =

KGVO may refer to:

- KECI-TV, a television station (channel 13) licensed to serve Missoula, Montana, which held the call sign KGVO-TV from 1954 to 1956 and 1964 to 1978
- KGVO (AM), a radio station (1290 AM) licensed to serve Missoula, Montana, United States
- KFGM-FM, a radio station (101.5 FM) licensed to serve Frenchtown, Montana, which held the call sign KGVO-FM from 2012 to 2016
