= KDXT =

Radio station in Lolo–Missoula, Montana

- Lolo, Montana; United States
- Broadcast area: Missoula, Montana
- Frequency: 97.9 MHz (HD Radio)
- Branding: The Ranch

Programming
- Format: Country
- Subchannels: HD1: KDXT analog HD2: Christian talk and teaching "Radio By Grace"; HD3: Classic hits "94.3 The Ride"

Ownership
- Owner: Western Rockies Radio, Inc.
- Sister stations: KHDV, KMSO

History
- First air date: 1996

Technical information
- Licensing authority: FCC
- Facility ID: 16089
- Class: C3
- ERP: 10,000 watts
- HAAT: 127 meters (417 feet)
- Transmitter coordinates: 46°30′37″N 113°58′48″W
- Translators: HD3: 94.3 K232CI (Missoula); HD2: 95.3 K237DZ (Missoula); 107.1 K296FM (Missoula)

Links
- Public license information: Public file; LMS
- Webcast: Listen Live
- Website: KDXT Online; KDXT-HD3 Online

KDXT (97.9 FM, "The Ranch") is a radio station licensed to serve Lolo, Montana. The station is licensed to Western Rockies Radio, Inc. It airs a country music format.

The station was assigned the KDXT call letters by the Federal Communications Commission on July 5, 2006.

On May 10, 2011, KDXT changed their format from classic rock to country, branded as "The Ranch". It was noted that the KDXT call letters formerly belonged to a CHR station in Missoula at 93.3. XT 93 as it then called was the "music FM" It operated as the main CHR station in Missoula before becoming KGGL in 1996, also playing country music.

== HD Radio ==
KDXT airs a religious format on its HD2 subchannel, branded as "Radio By Grace", relaying KRBG Umbarger, TX (simulcast on translator K237DZ 95.3 Missoula) and a classic hits format on its HD3 subchannel, branded as "94.3 The Ride" (simulcast on translator K232CI 94.3 Missoula).

== Translators ==
KDXT also broadcasts on the following translators:

Broadcast translator for KDXT
Call sign	Frequency	City of license	FID	ERP (W)	Class	FCC info
K296FM	107.1 FM	Missoula, Montana	155131	99	D	LMS

Broadcast translator for KDXT-HD2
Call sign	Frequency	City of license	FID	ERP (W)	Class	FCC info
K237DZ	95.3 FM	Missoula, Montana	147617	99	D	LMS

Broadcast translator for KDXT-HD3
Call sign	Frequency	City of license	FID	ERP (W)	Class	FCC info
K232CI	94.3 FM	Missoula, Montana	146259	250	D	LMS
