= Lolo Peak Fire =

2017 fire in Montana

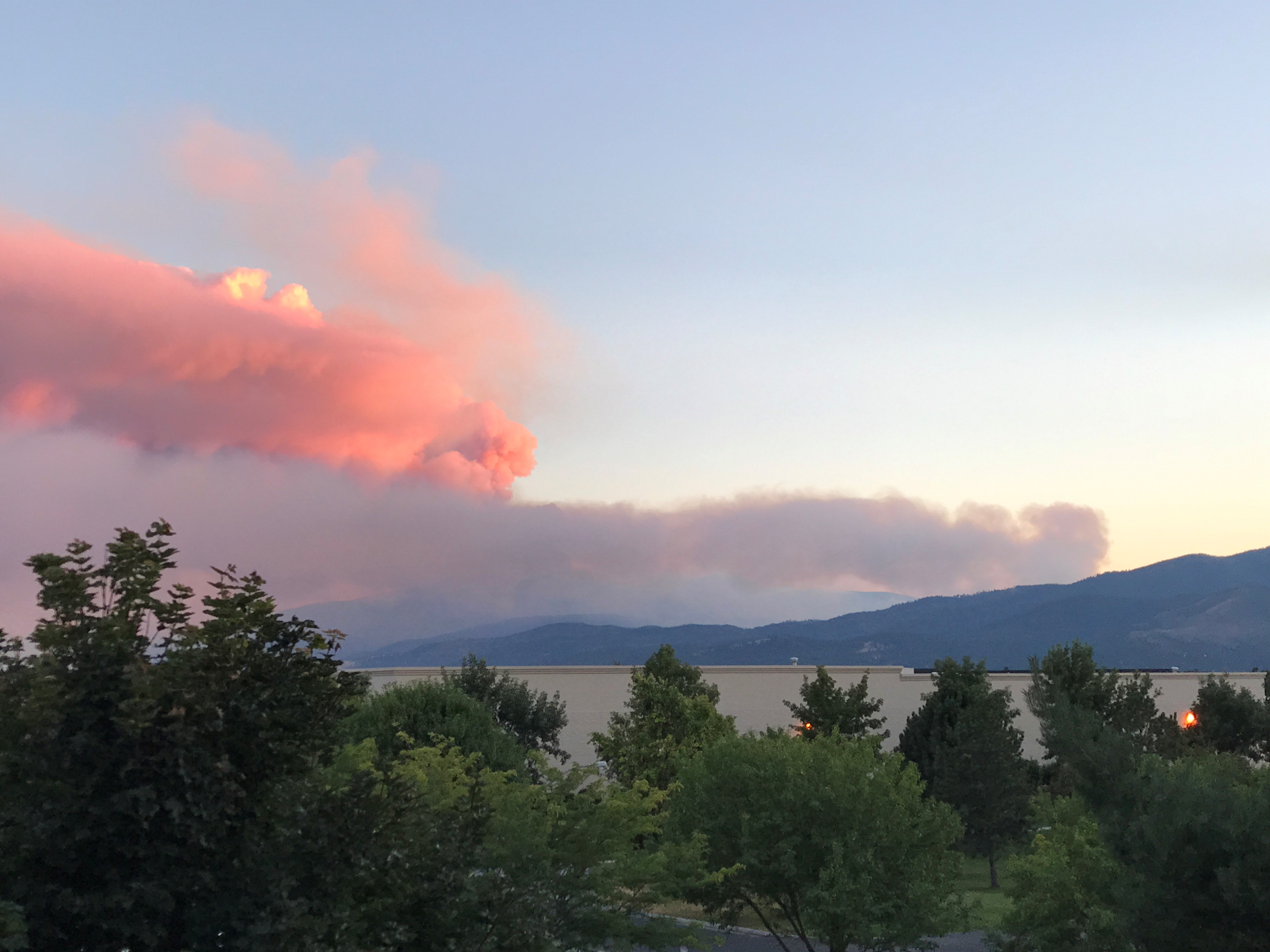
- Lolo Peak Fire on August 16, 2017
- Date: July 15, 2017 –
- Location: Lolo National Forest and Bitterroot National Forest, Montana in the United States
- Coordinates: 46.674°N 114.268°W

Statistics
- Burned area: 53,902 acres (218 km^{2})

Impacts
- Deaths: 1
- Injuries: 1
- Structures lost: 2
- Cost: $34.6 million

Ignition
- Cause: Lightning

Map
- Location of fire in Montana

The Lolo Peak Fire was a wildfire in Lolo National Forest and Bitterroot National Forest, Montana in the United States, that began by lightning strikes on the western flank of Lolo Peak, 10 miles southwest of Lolo, Montana on July 15, 2017. The fire burned a total of 53,902 acres (218 km^{2}). One firefighter, Brent Witham, was killed working the fire, and another firefighter was injured. Two homes were destroyed, over 3,000 people were evacuated and 1,150 residences were threatened. The fire threatened homes along Highway 12 and Highway 93, impacting recreational activities in the area and the communities of Lolo and Florence.

== Events ==
=== July ===
The Lolo Peak Fire was started by a lightning strike on July 15, 2017. By July 19, the fire had burned 165 acres (1 km^{2}), burning between Meadow Creek and Fall Creek, about one mile west of Lolo Peak's summit. Closures began, specifically numerous forest roads and six trails. Fire fuels include whitepark pine, subalpine fir, subalpine larch and mixed conifer. One week later, by July 29, fire crews began structure assessments for approximately 900 homeowners. Additional roads were closed in the forest and flight restrictions were in place.

=== August ===
By the beginning of August, the fire continued to burn on the south fork of Lolo Creek and Lantern Creek. It also made a run towards Dick Creek. Additional closures took place, including areas within campgrounds. Evacuation warning was put in place for Fort Fizzle and Elk Meadows Road, including Mill Creek. The fire had jumped across Lantern Ridge into Cedar Creek. On August 2, firefighter Brent Witham, from Mentone, California, was killed when a tree fell on him while fighting the Lolo Peak Fire.

As of August 10, the fire had spread to Johnny Creek and efforts took place to prevent the fire from moving towards the community of Lolo. The next day, evacuation warnings were expanded to include the north and south sides of Highway 12 from Fort Fizzle west to Mile Post 20 at Bear Creek. The fire expanded into Tevis and Mill Creeks and mandatory evacuation was put in place for both sides of Highway 12 between Bear Creek and Fort Fizzle. Pilot cars began guiding cars through the evacuated area of Highway 12. The fire expanded significantly by August 16, moving to the north ridge of Carlton Lake and Mormon Creek.

On August 17, two homes and several structures destroyed in the fire. The homes, located on Upper Folsom Road, was started when embers crossed the containment line.

New evacuation orders were put in place and by August 20, the Montana National Guard was assisting with the fire in response to Governor Steve Bullock declaring a statewide fire emergency. Highway 12 remained open with cars being escorted by pilot cars in select areas and Highway 93 was closed. On Saturday, a firefighter's arm was broken when he fell after being hit by a rock while fighting the fire. The fire had burned over 30,000 acres (121 km^{2}) by Sunday.

Evacuation orders were lifted for select areas around Highway 12 on August 21. Shots were fired in the vicinity of the fire, in the Mill Creek area, on August 23 and all fire fighting activities were ceased. That same day, evacuation orders were put in place for residents of Sweeney Creek Loop and surrounding areas. On the 26th of August, fire crews moved into the Bass Creek area and worked to remove clear trees and vegetation near Little Joe Cabin. The next day, the Montana National Guard was called off the fire.

By the end of August, the fire was burning along One Horse Creek. The fire began impacting home sales in the area. Insurance companies stopped writing policies for the high risk area around Lolo Peak, impacting 181 active listings and 67 houses pending sales. As of August 31, the fire had burned over 39,400 acres (159 km^{2}), was 31% contained, and estimated to cost $34.6 million.

=== September ===
By September 1, select evacuation warnings remained in place and the fire continued to burn in One Horse Creek and the northern end of Sweeney Creek. New evacuation warnings were introduced on the evening of September 3, due to 10 more houses being threatened by the fire. On September 5, closures were ordered for of Lolo National Forest, Nez Perce National Forest and Clearwater National Forest. The fire moved out of Lolo Creek and into Brushy Creek. Crews completed fire protection on the Skookum Butte fire overlook on the Montana and Idaho border.

By September 18, unified command was dissolved and by September 24, perimeter growth of the fire had stopped.

== Evacuations and closures ==
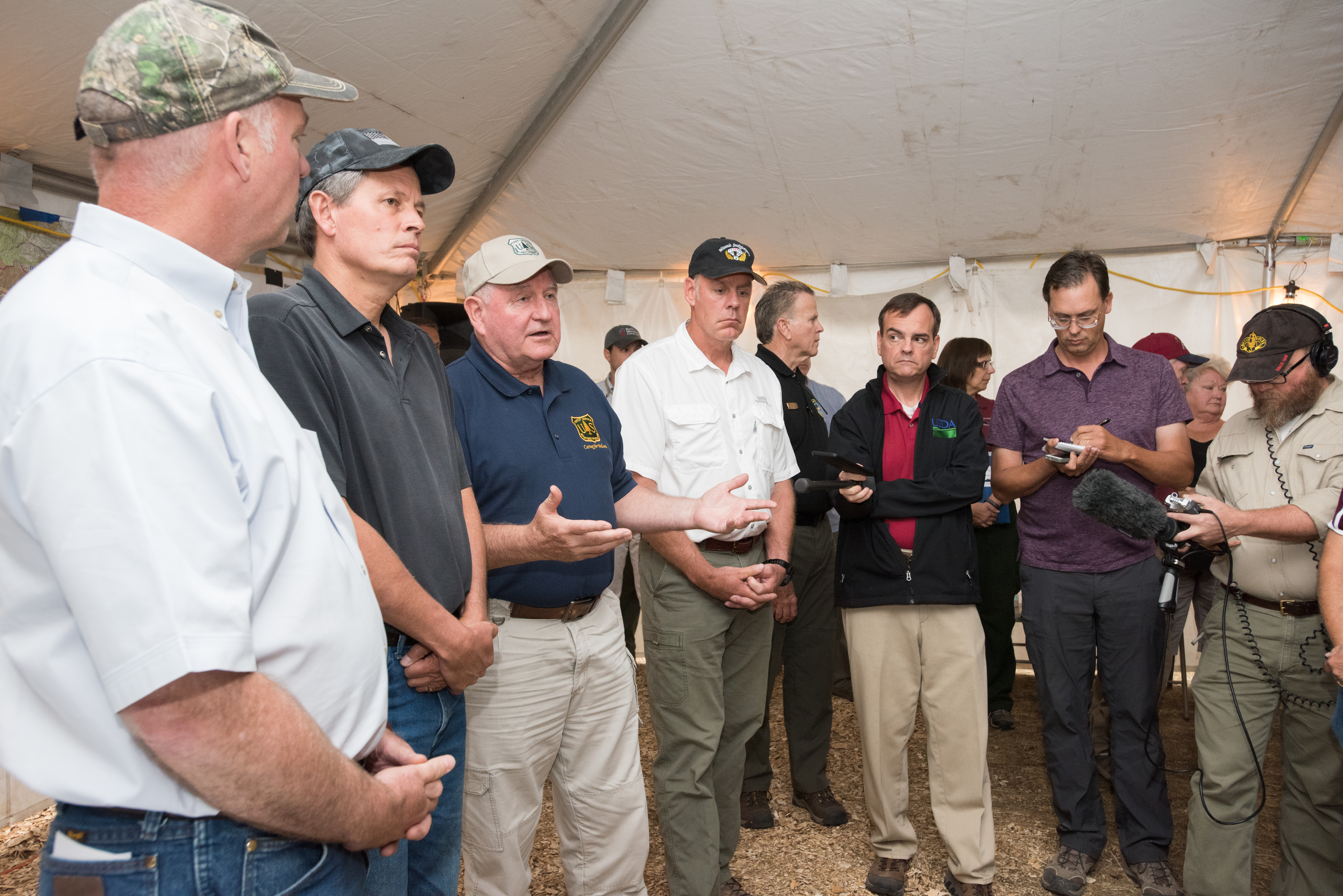
Many interagency and departmental personnel brief Secretary of Agriculture Sonny Perdue, Secretary of Interior Ryan Zinke, U.S. Senator Steve Daines, and U.S. Congressman Greg Gianforte on Montana fires.

Evacuation warnings were in place for all residents west of Highway 93 to South Kootenia Creek Road, including Redtail Hawk Lane. The evacuation warning remains in effect from Hannaford Avenue north to West County Lane Road and west of Highway 93 as well as in the Bear Creek and Elk Creek areas on Highway 12 west of Lolo.

Highway 12 remained open with the assistance of a pilot car although old Highway 93 was closed to all traffic from Tie Chut Lane north.

Road and trail closures were established around the fire for public safety: Bass Creek NFSR #1136, beginning at the junction of NFSR#1316 and the Charles Waters Campground and through section 32, T.10N, R20W, Elk Meadow Road (NFSR #451) from Junction US Hwy 12 to the Clearwater National Forest Boundary, West Fork Butte Road (NFSR #37 ) from the West Fork Butte Lookout to the intersection with the Elk Meadow Road (NFSR #451), Mormon Peak Road (NFSR #612), South Fork Lolo Creek Road (NFSR #2160), Small Creek Road (NFSR #4292), West Fork Butte Trail (NFST #320), Mill Creek Trail (NFST #1310), Sweeney Trail (NFST #393), and Bass Creek Trail (NFST #4). Including all road encompassed by the area closure intersecting with open roads.

As of September 28, 2017, all evacuations had been lifted and most roads were open, though a few trail closures remained in effect.

== Lawsuit ==
After the fire, in Schurg v. United States, a group of property owners on whose property the U.S. Forest Service prescribed controlled burns filed a lawsuit against the government under the Federal Tort Claims Act. The property owners complained that although the Forest Service held public events to spread the word about the possibility of controlled burns on people's private property, it did not personally consult with them before doing the burns on their properties. The case was decided against the plaintiffs, a decision which was affirmed upon appeal to the Ninth Circuit.
