= KENR =

- Superior, Montana; United States
- Broadcast area: Missoula, Montana
- Frequency: 107.5 MHz
- Branding: "Star Hit Radio 107.5"

Programming
- Format: Top 40 (CHR)

Ownership
- Owner: Dennis and Nila Anderson; (Anderson Radio Broadcasting, Inc.)
- Sister stations: KLYQ, KXDR, KYLT

History
- First air date: 1998

Technical information
- Licensing authority: FCC
- Facility ID: 88404
- Class: C1
- ERP: 100,000 watts
- HAAT: 288 meters
- Transmitter coordinates: 47°1′45″N 114°41′18″W

Links
- Public license information: Public file; LMS
- Website: starhitradio.com

KENR (107.5 FM, "107.5 Star Hit Radio") is a commercial radio station located in Superior, Montana, United States, broadcasting to the Missoula, Montana, area. KENR broadcasts a contemporary hit radio music format.

== History ==
The station began as an FM simulcast of the then nostalgia KLCY and became the adult contemporary KLTC in October 2001. Lite Fm, as it was called, was the first station in the Missoula market to broadcast continuous Christmas music during the holiday season. It became the second station in the market to broadcast the syndicated Delilah show until the end of the 2002 Christmas season. It then became an adult top 40 station as Wild 1075. In 2004, the format was moved to more of a contemporary hit radio format and by September it had started an urban format from 7 pm to midnight. For a few days it became a fully fledged hip-hop station before moving back to hot adult contemporary. The part-time rap format became popular amongst the college crowd. However the Wild boys antics caused some local controversy plus their sponsored parties became known to get out of control leading to the demise of Wild 107.5.

On the weekend of July 4, 2005, it changed to triple A as Rock 107.5. However, unlike most adult alternative stations, it did play heavy songs such as "More Human than Human" and "Crazy Train", and harder selections by Metallica, Nirvana and Pearl Jam mixed in with more standard triple A bands such as Coldplay, U2 & INXS to take on clustermate 963 The Blaze & newly launched trail 1033. Eventually, the station slowly evolved into a mainstream rock. It also became the first station to air the syndicated Bob & Tom show.

KLTC remained a rock station until January 2007, when it changed to a rhythmic adult contemporary format as "Energy 107.5", which changed to a rhythmic contemporary format in 2008, claiming to be "Your Only Station In The State For Hip-Hop & R&B". It still played a wider variety of rhythmic product than most rhythmic pop stations in the nation. The switch also brought back the Kidd Kraddick morning show to Missoula. The station also started internet streaming and tried to market itself with an interactive approach. In 2009, the station changed to contemporary hit radio as "107.5 Zoo FM" but still kept most of the rhythmic titles it had as Energy and continues to lean rhythmic to try to compete with KXDR and Hot AC's KMSO and KKVU. 107.5 Zoo FM has become the frequency's most successful and popular format as they have aired it for over five years.

On June 17, 2022, Townsquare Media announced that it will move Zoo-FM to 96.9 K245AP in Missoula replacing half of the simulcast with KHKM, as KENR was divested to Anderson Radio Broadcasting effective that day. Zoo FM moved to 96.9 in July 2022 with a new format probable on 107.5. In November 2022, Anderson Broadcasting rebranded the station as "107.5 Star Hit Radio" with a CHR format.
