= KUFM =

KUFM may refer to:

- KUFM-TV, a television station (channel 11 analog/27 digital) licensed to Missoula, Montana, United States, simulcasting KUSM
- KUFM (FM), a radio station (89.1 FM) licensed to Missoula, Montana, United States
