= KGPR =

- Great Falls, Montana; United States
- Frequency: 89.9 MHz (HD Radio)
- Branding: Montana Public Radio

Programming
- Format: Public radio
- Affiliations: Montana Public Radio; National Public Radio; American Public Media; Public Radio Exchange

Ownership
- Owner: Great Falls Public Radio; (Great Falls Public Radio Association)

History
- First air date: 1984

Technical information
- Licensing authority: FCC
- Facility ID: 24955
- Class: C3
- ERP: 9,500 watts
- HAAT: 90 meters (300 ft)
- Transmitter coordinates: 47.540°N 111.286°W

Links
- Public license information: Public file; LMS
- Webcast: Listen live
- Website: www.kgpr.org

KGPR (89.9 FM) is a non-profit radio station licensed to Great Falls, Montana. The station is owned by the Great Falls Public Radio Association, and it is an affiliate of Montana Public Radio, with programming originating locally as well as from KUFM in Missoula, Montana. The KGPR studio is located on the campus of Great Falls College Montana State University.
