= KVWE =

KVWE may refer to:

- KVWE (FM), a radio station (102.9 FM) licensed to serve Amarillo, Texas, United States
- KFGM-FM, a radio station (101.5 FM) licensed to serve Frenchtown, Montana, United States, which held the call sign KVWE from 2009 to 2012
