= KAMM =

KAMM may refer to:

- KAMM (AM), a radio station (1540 AM) licensed to serve University Park, Texas, United States
- KAMM-LP, a former television station licensed to Amarillo, Texas
- KFGM-FM, a radio station (101.5 FM) licensed to serve Frenchtown, Montana, United States, which held the call sign KAMM-FM from 2016 to 2022
