= Fort Fizzle (Montana) =

- Fort Fizzle Site
- U.S. National Register of Historic Places
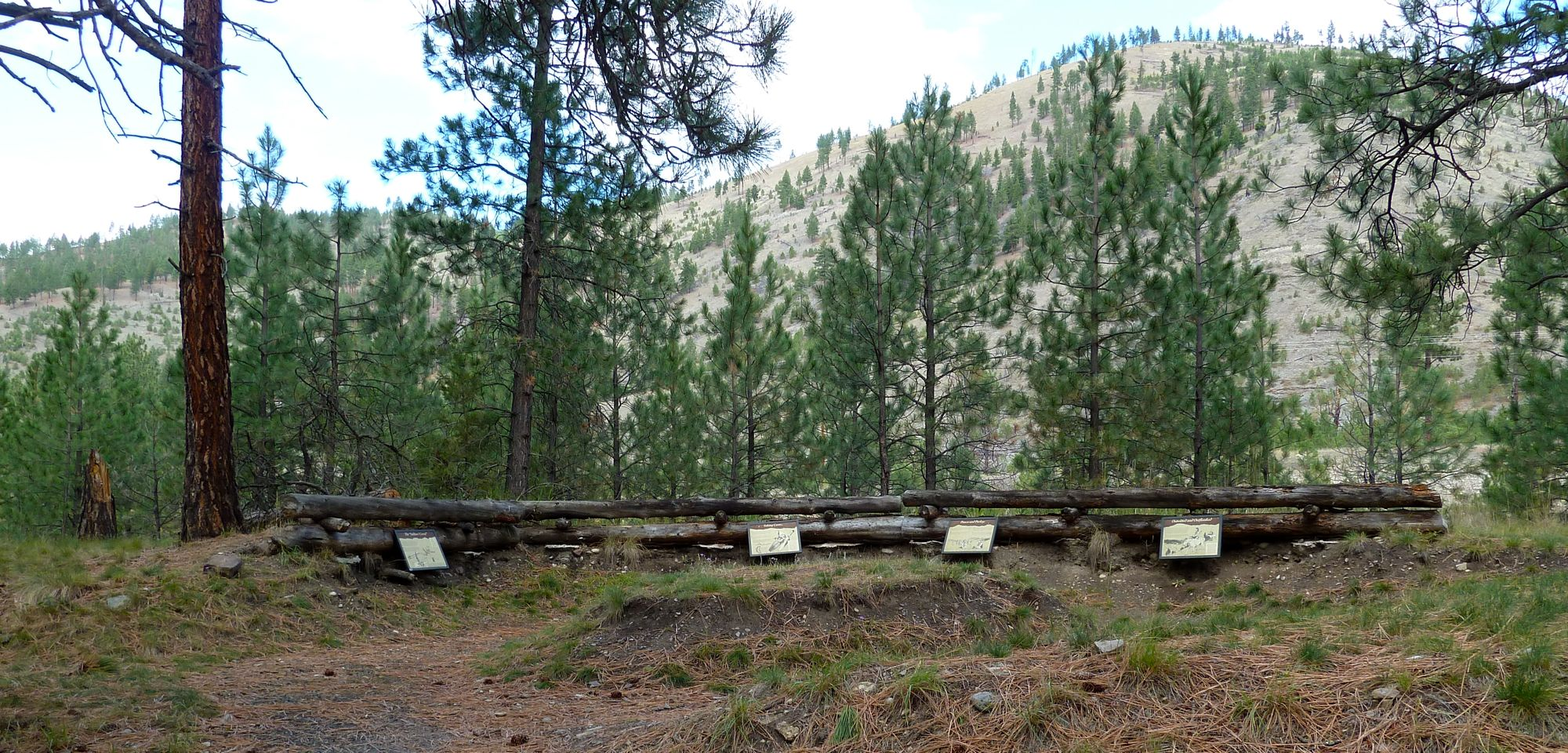
- Location in the United States##Location in Montana Territory

- Location within the United States Location within Montana
- Location: Missoula County, Montana Territory, U.S.
- Nearest city: Lolo and Missoula
- Coordinates: 46.7463°N 114.172°W
- Area: 120.4 acres (0.49 km^{2})
- Built by: U.S. Army
- NRHP reference No.: 77000821
- Added to NRHP: July 21, 1977

Fort Fizzle was a temporary military barricade in the western United States, erected by the U.S. Army in July 1877 in Montana Territory. Its purpose was to intercept the Nez Perce in their flight from north central Idaho Territory over Lolo Pass into the Bitterroot Valley of western Montana. The name describes the effectiveness of the fort.

== Background ==
In the Nez Perce War of 1877, the U.S. Army defeated, but did not demoralize, the Nez Perce under Chief Joseph at the Battle of the Clearwater, July 11–12. Pursued by General O. O. Howard the Nez Perce, numbering about 200 warriors and 750 persons in total along with more than 2,000 horses, decided to flee across Lolo Pass into the Bitterroot Valley and onward to the Great Plains.

The Nez Perce were familiar with this region, having been frequent visitors while en route to the plains to hunt buffalo. Their leader Looking Glass persuaded the other Nez Perce leaders that they would be safe from the U.S. Army in Montana and that he could lead them to a safe refuge among his friends, the Crow Indians.

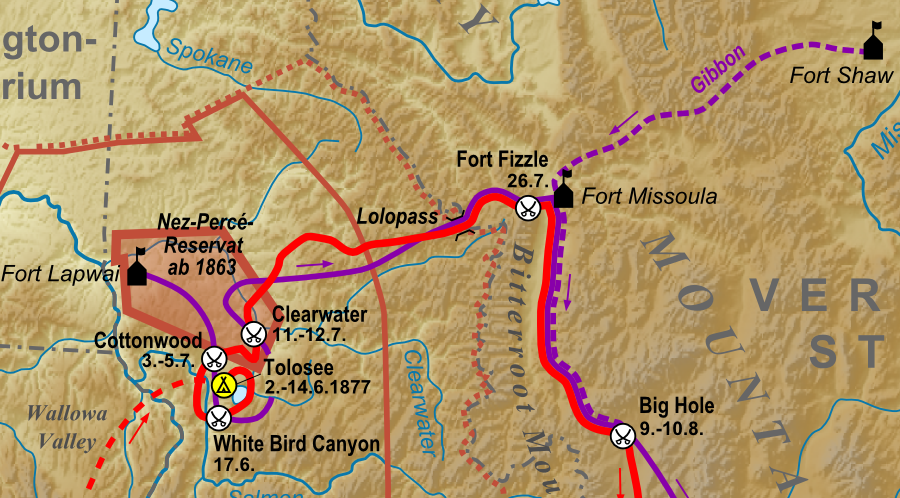
The Nez Perce route across Lolo Pass to Fort Fizzle and beyond

== The Army and the Nez Perce ==
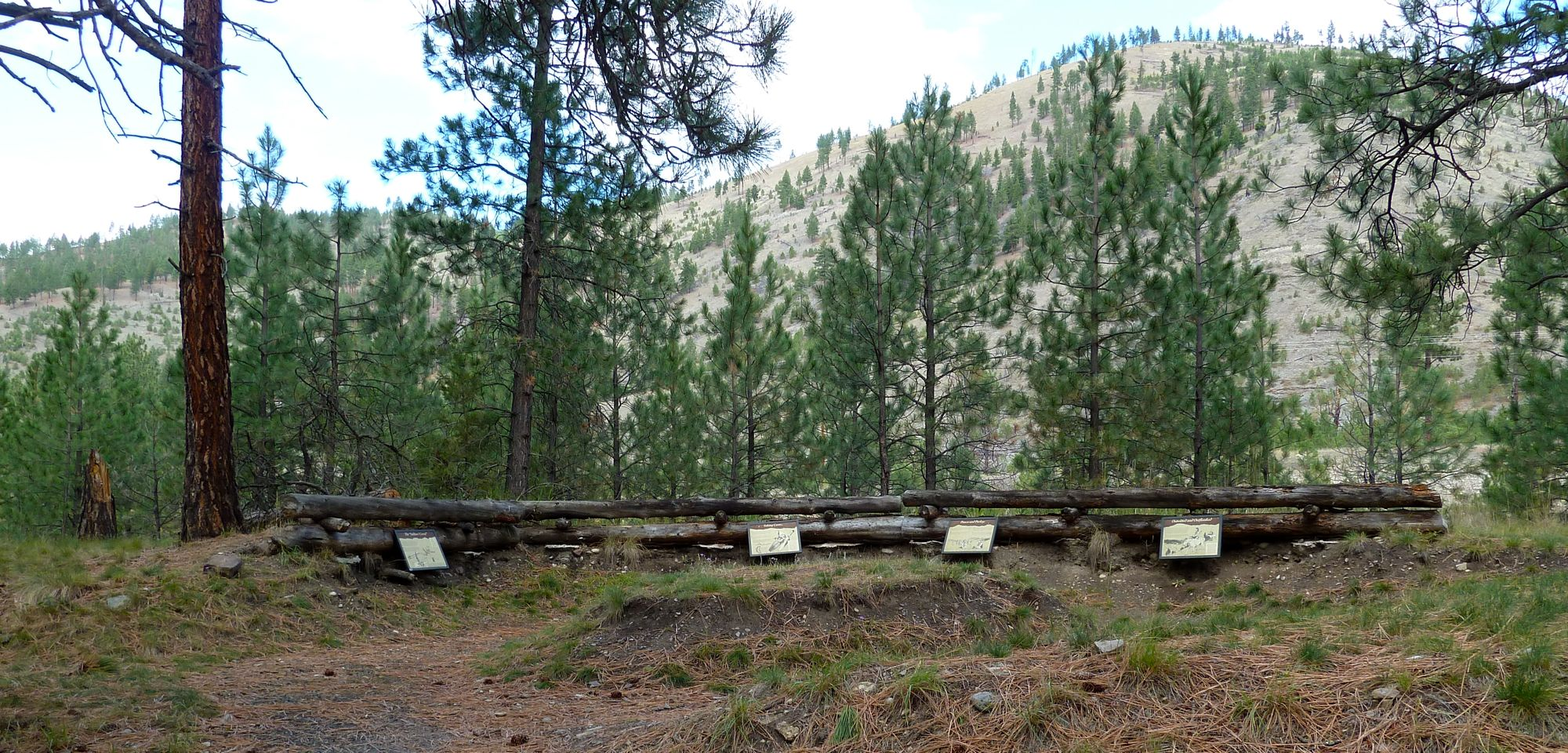
A reconstruction of part of the fort at Fort Fizzle Historic Site in Montana

White settlers and U.S. Army soldiers in the Bitterroot Valley, informed by telegraph that the Nez Perce were coming their way, prepared to defend themselves. Captain Charles Rawn had only 35 soldiers to defend the valley. On July 23, two white youths who had been prisoners of the Nez Perce reported to Rawn that the Nez Perce were camped at Lolo Hot Springs, on the Montana side of the pass and only a few miles from the white settlements in the Bitterroot Valley. The youths had been released to bring a message from the Nez Perce that they wished to pass peacefully through the settlements. Rawn, however, was ordered to "compel the Indians to surrender their arms and ammunition, and to dispute their passage, by force of arms, into Bitterroot Valley."

On July 25, Rawn, his 35 soldiers and 50 civilian volunteers constructed a wooden barricade of logs and earth two or three miles (5 km) below where the Nez Perce were camped and about five miles (8 km) west of Lolo. On July 26, Rawn met with Looking Glass who requested to traverse the Bitterroot Valley without violence. Rawn demanded that the Nez Perce surrender their arms and ammunition and the meeting terminated without any decision.

The next day, 216 armed men, including 15 to 20 Flathead Indian scouts were gathered at the improvised fort and the Governor of Montana, Benjamin F. Potts, had arrived. Rawn and Looking Glass met again and each repeated their demands. When Rawn returned to the fort and said that he anticipated a battle with the Nez Perce, most of the volunteers left, declaring that "no act of hostility on their part should provoke the Indians." The next morning, July 27, less than 100 men were left to man the fort and oppose the Nez Perce. Governor Potts had also found reason to depart.

According to Chief Joseph, Captain Rawn agreed to allow the Nez Perce to pass through Bitterroot Valley in peace. Rawn never admitted making such an agreement.

The barricade where Rawn and his men were entrenched was in a constricted 200-yard (180 m) wide passage in the Lolo Creek canyon, enclosed on both sides by precipitous ridges where "a goat could not pass." Nevertheless, on July 28 the Nez Perce – men, women, children, and livestock—climbed the ridges to the north and bypassed the barricade, leaving the defenders in their rear. Rawn and his soldiers exchanged a few shots with the Nez Perce on the ridge and then abandoned the fort and followed them down into the Bitterroot Valley at a safe distance. An advance party of soldiers bumped into the rear guard of the Nez Perce. Looking Glass exchanged friendly greetings with them. Fifty of the civilian volunteers stumbled into the Nez Perce camp and were captured, but were released after Looking Glass promised no violence against anybody. The soldiers retired to Missoula, the civilian volunteers disbanded, and the Nez Perce continued on their way south through the Bitterroot Valley, buying fresh horses, food, and supplies from local ranchers and farmers.

Thus, the makeshift fort acquired its name -- "Fort Fizzle."

== The aftermath ==
The Fort Fizzle fiasco prompted volleys of charges and counter-charges of cowardice and ineptitude between and among the government and citizens of Montana and the U.S. government and its army. A volunteer explained that "we were not silly enough to uselessly incite the Indians to devastate our valley." Many Montanans, including the governor and fire-breathing journalists, began to comment favorably on the "bravery" and "audacity" of the Nez Perce and the wisdom of the citizens in avoiding an armed encounter.

However, the respite from war of the Nez Perce was brief. Lulled into complacency by their peaceful passage through the Bitterroot Valley, they were attacked on August 9 by Colonel John Gibbon and 200 men in the bloody Battle of the Big Hole.

A portion of the fort has been reconstructed at Fort Fizzle Historic Site, adjacent to U.S. Route 12, several miles west of Lolo. At an approximate elevation of 3,350 feet (1,020 m) above sea level, the site parallels the historic Lolo trail once used by the Nez Perce, Bitterroot Salish, and Ktunaxa tribes and Lewis and Clark. Lewis and Clark's westbound expedition ascended Lolo Creek in mid-September 1805, and they revisited the area on their way back east in late June 1806.
