= KBAZ =

- Hamilton, Montana; United States
- Broadcast area: Missoula, Montana
- Frequency: 96.3 MHz
- Branding: 96.3 The Blaze

Programming
- Format: Mainstream rock
- Affiliations: Compass Media Networks; United Stations Radio Networks

Ownership
- Owner: Townsquare Media; (Townsquare License, LLC)
- Sister stations: KGGL, KGRZ, KGVO, KMPT, KYSS-FM, KZOQ-FM

History
- First air date: February 11, 1969
- Former call signs: KLYQ-FM (1969–1987; KBMG (1987–2000)
- Call sign meaning: From "Blaze" branding

Technical information
- Licensing authority: FCC
- Facility ID: 4700
- Class: C
- ERP: 53,000 watts
- HAAT: 637 meters (2,090 ft)
- Transmitter coordinates: 46°48′8″N 113°28′51″W

Links
- Public license information: Public file; LMS
- Webcast: Listen Live
- Website: 963theblaze.com

KBAZ (96.3 FM, "The Blaze") is a commercial radio station in Hamilton, Montana, broadcasting to the Missoula, Montana, area. KBAZ airs a mainstream rock music format.

== History ==
On November 27, 1968, the Bitter Root Broadcasting Company, owners of KLYQ (1240 AM) obtained a construction permit for a new FM radio station on 95.9 MHz in Hamilton. It began on February 11, 1969, and was used to extend the then-daytime station's service to the nighttime hours. By 1980, KLYQ-FM was programming an easy listening format separate from country music on the AM frequency. Stereo broadcasting began in late 1980, and by 1981 the station was airing adult contemporary music during daytime hours and Top 40 at night.

At the start of 1982, the KLYQ stations were sold to Alexander Communications, Inc. That company filed for bankruptcy in 1984, and the properties were conveyed back to their previous owner, Luin K. Dexter, who then sold both to Bob Massey, a native of Missoula. When Massey sold the stations to Steve Benedict in late 1986, Benedict set out to give the FM outlet its own identity and relaunched it as KBMG "Magic 96" in March 1987.

Benedict sold KLYQ and KBMG to American Cities Broadcasting of Chicago in 1997, working for the new company after the sale; that company had also acquired three Missoula stations for $4.5 million. Under American Cities (which changed its name to Marathon Media), KBMG was approved for a transmitter relocation and power upgrade to 85,000 watts, which placed the station into the Missoula market. A major format change followed. On March 28, 2000, Magic 96 yielded to a new format programmed from Missoula, alternative "The Blaze"; some local programming for Hamilton moved to the AM station, and there were job losses there as well. Marathon then sold its Montana radio properties to Clear Channel Communications in 2001 along with five stations in Washington and Oregon; the $30 million transaction was spurred because the company felt the assets were "mature" and at their peak in performance terms.

In October 2007, a deal was reached for Clear Channel to sell KBAZ to GAP Broadcasting II LLC (as part of a 57-station deal with a total reported sale price of $74.78 million. What eventually became GapWest Broadcasting was folded into Townsquare Media on August 13, 2010.
