= KXDR =

- Pinesdale, Montana; United States
- Broadcast area: Missoula, Montana
- Frequency: 106.7 MHz
- Branding: Rock 106.7

Programming
- Format: Classic rock

Ownership
- Owner: Anderson Radio Broadcasting, Inc.
- Sister stations: KENR, KLYQ, KYLT

History
- First air date: August 12, 2001 (as KSXZ)
- Former call signs: KSXZ (2001–2003); KBQQ (2003–2012)

Technical information
- Licensing authority: FCC
- Facility ID: 89040
- Class: C0
- ERP: 38,000 watts
- HAAT: 637 meters
- Transmitter coordinates: 46°48′09.1″N 113°58′22.5″W

Links
- Public license information: Public file; LMS
- Webcast: Listen Live
- Website: kxdrrocks.com

KXDR (106.7 FM, "Now 106.7") is a commercial radio station in Hamilton, Montana, broadcasting to the Missoula, Montana, area. KXDR airs a Classic rock music format. Both KXDR's signals started out as a simulcast of then CHR KDXT. The translators then flipped to country as the station became Eagle 93. The translator then broke apart in summer of 1999 flipping to Adult top 40. Throughout the next ten years the station has had a CHR format meandering between an adult top 40, Rhythmic and Modern AC approach. The station has carried Ryan Seacrest's AT40 program since it premiered in January 2004. Until this year, the station also rebroadcast on a low-powered translator at 96.9 to cover areas of Missoula that cannot receive the 98.7 signal.

As of January 1, 2012, KXDR suspended its translator at 92.7 and moved its signal to 106.7. The 98.7 signal flipped to sister station KBQQ's oldies format. With the new signal at 106.7 the station now has better coverage of the Missoula valley. The station still boasts as the only Top 40 in Missoula but competes against KENR & KKVU.

On January 19, to take part in the growing market for FM sports talk, Cherry Creek Radio put a simulcast of K-GRIZ sports talk 1450 giving Missoula its first FM Sports talk station.

On November 4, 2016, KXDR rebranded as "Now 106.7".

Effective June 17, 2022, Cherry Creek Radio sold KXDR and 62 other stations and translators to Townsquare Media for $18.75 million. Townsquare simultaneously flipped KXDR and three other stations to Anderson Radio Broadcasting, Inc. for $150,000. The station has since rebranded as "Rock 106.7" and "Now 106.7"'s programming moved to KENR.
