= KGRZ =

- Missoula, Montana; United States
- Frequency: 1450 kHz
- Branding: Griz Sports 1450 and 92.7

Programming
- Format: Sports
- Affiliations: Fox Sports Radio

Ownership
- Owner: Townsquare Media; (Townsquare License, LLC)
- Sister stations: KBAZ; KGGL; KGVO; KMPT; KYSS-FM; KZOQ-FM

History
- First air date: February 29, 1948
- Former call signs: KXLL (1948–1963); KGMY (1963–1977)
- Call sign meaning: For the Montana Grizzlies

Technical information
- Licensing authority: FCC
- Facility ID: 63879
- Class: C
- Power: 1,000 watts (unlimited)
- Transmitter coordinates: 46°52′38.7″N 114°2′39.4″W
- Translator: 92.7 K224AA (Missoula)

Links
- Public license information: Public file; LMS
- Webcast: Listen live
- Website: kgrzmissoula.com

KGRZ (1450 AM, "Griz Sports 1450 and 92.7") is a radio station licensed to serve Missoula, Montana, United States. The station is owned by Townsquare Media and licensed to Townsquare License, LLC. It airs a sports format.

KGRZ is Missoula's second-oldest operating radio station, having gone on the air as KXLL in 1948. After a financial failure, the station broadcast a Christian format for five years in the 1960s, then returned to music formats as primarily a country music outlet between 1968 and 1997.

== History ==
=== KXLL ===
On June 3, 1946, Western Montana Associates applied for a construction permit to build a new radio station in Missoula on 630 kHz. This was amended to 1450 kHz and granted on November 14 of that year. The owners of the permittee were three men, one from Butte and two from Helena. The station remained unbuilt by May 1947, but it had been rolled into the growing Z Bar Network, with affiliation with NBC and the call sign of KXLL (to match the XL designations of the other Z Bar outlets). The station made its debut February 29, 1948, marking the first new service for the city since KGVO (1290 AM) started in 1930.

Goodover remained with KXLL until 1958, when he purchased station KXLK at Great Falls; Craney needed to sell that outlet to purchase KFBB radio and KFBB-TV. Two years later, the Z-Bar network was sold off to separate owners, with June, Inc.—owned by the Wilson family—purchasing KXLL.

=== KGMY ===
After more than two years running KXLL, however, the station's financial condition had worsened. At midnight on February 7, 1963, the station closed down and went silent. Christian Enterprises, Inc., which owned stations airing Christian programming in Billings, Glendive and Belgrade, purchased the outlet for $28,000, with the Wilsons receiving a waiver of the Federal Communications Commission's three-year ownership minimum to sell the property. On November 21, the station returned to the air with new KGMY call letters and a religious and "good" music format.

Christian Enterprises leased KGMY to Dewey and Lawrence G. Wilmot in 1966; the new operators, who also held an option to buy the station outright, intended to return KGMY to a popular music-based format. Nothing ever came of the agreement, however, and a new local firm, Mission Broadcasters, acquired the outlet in 1968. Mission hired a station manager who had worked at KGVW, the original Christian Enterprises station, and claimed it would retain the "good music" format. However, the station manager was replaced that December, and KGMY flipped to country music. Daytime power was increased to 1,000 watts in 1971.

=== KGRZ ===
Robert Ingstad of Grand Forks, North Dakota, purchased KGMY from Mission in 1977. The station was shut down for a month while new studios were built in the Town and Country Shopping Center—replacing the transmitter site studios used since the start of operations. The call letters were also changed to KGRZ, and the country music format was broadened. Ingstad then purchased KDXT (93.3 FM). During this time, morning host Dan Sollom—who, like Ingstad, was a Grand Forks native—did a regular North Dakota "joke of the mornin'" on his show.

KGRZ and KDXT were sold to Wind Point 1970 Holding Company, which was owned by the S.C. Johnson family, in 1982. (The name likely came from the fact that the Johnsons' first bank was founded in a trailer in Wind Point that year.) The next year, the country format was jettisoned in favor of oldies. The two stations were then sold to Sunbrook Communications in 1986; Sunbrook opted to flip KGRZ back to country the following year.

The country format's second stint lasted until 1991, when the station flipped to jazz music as "Lite Jazz 1450"; the unusual format for an AM station was intended to revive it and also a recognition that KYSS-FM 94.9 had taken most of the country audience in the Missoula market. Within a year, this was replaced by adult standards. The station then turned back to country by September 1993.

Sunbrook sold its radio properties—ten in Montana and a pair in Wenatchee, Washington—to Seattle-based Fisher Broadcasting in 1994, with Sunbrook becoming a division of Fisher after the sale was completed. The sports talk format was adopted by 1997.

In a 24-station sale that was only partially completed, Fisher sold many of its small-market radio properties to Cherry Creek Radio in 2006 in order to fund an expansion into Spanish-language television in major Pacific Northwest markets. The 24 stations contributed just one-fourth of the radio division's revenue, with Fisher's three Seattle stations comprising the rest.

Effective June 17, 2022, Cherry Creek Radio sold KGRZ as part of a 42 station/21 translator package to Townsquare Media for $18.75 million.
