= Lolo Peak =

Mountain in Montana, United States

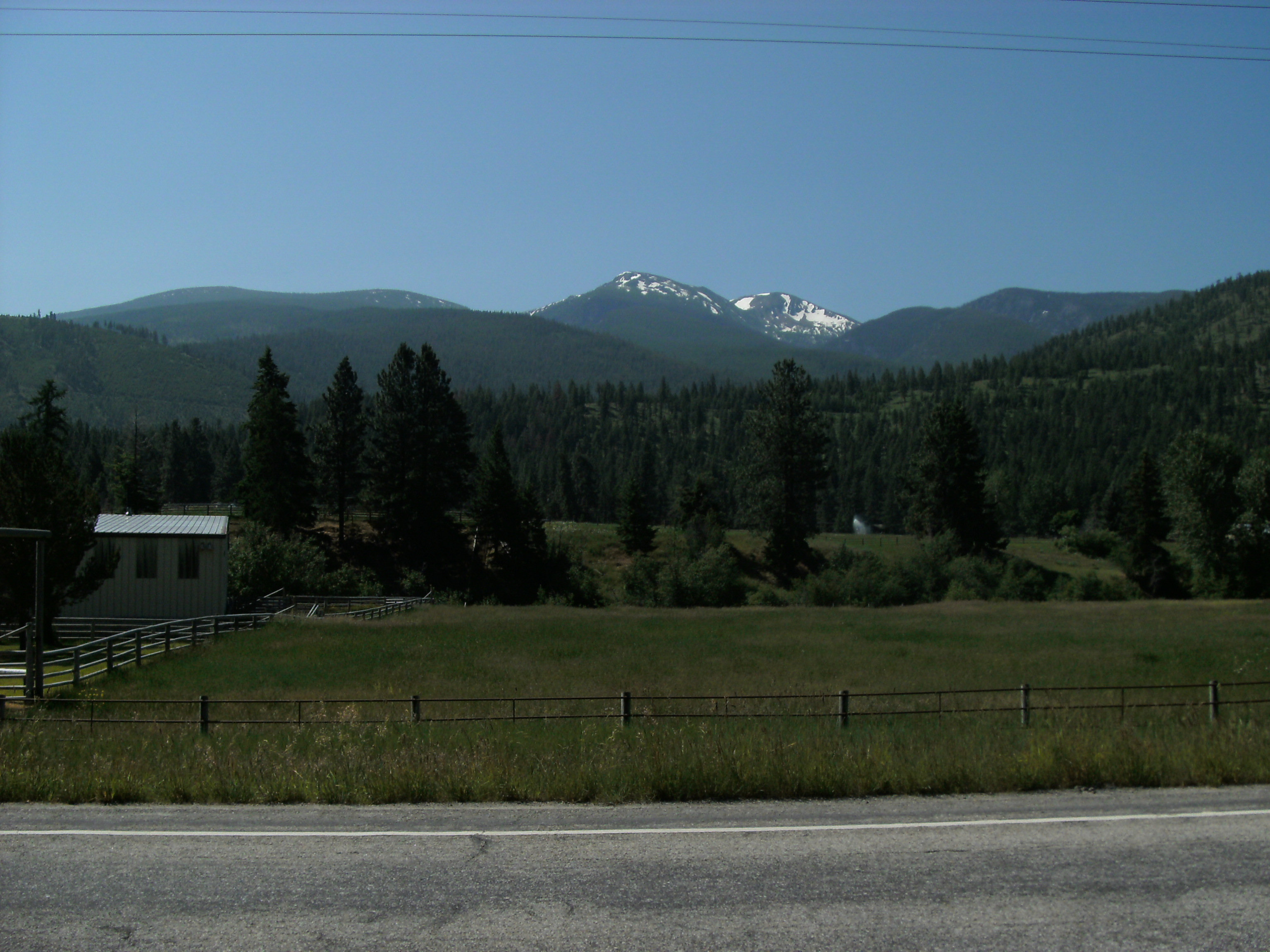
- Looking south at Lolo Peak from US 12 in 2009

Highest point
- Elevation: 9,143 ft (2,787 m) NAVD 88
- Prominence: 739 ft (225 m)
- Coordinates: 46°40′29″N 114°14′40″W

Geography
- Location within Montana
- Location: Missoula, Montana
- Parent range: Bitterroot Range; Rocky Mountains
- Topo map: USGS Carlton Lake

Lolo Peak is a 9,143 feet (2,787 m) mountain in the Bitterroot Range of western Montana, United States. It is in Missoula County, southwest of Missoula.

East of Lolo Pass at the Idaho border, the peak is visible to the south from US 12, which runs between the pass and Traveler's Rest in the town of Lolo.

== History ==
The name "Lolo" probably evolved from "Lou-Lou," a pronunciation of "Lawrence," a French-Canadian fur trapper killed by a grizzly bear and buried at Grave Creek. The first written evidence of the name "Lolo" appears in 1831 when Hudson's Bay Company fur trader John Work refers in his journal to Lolo Creek as "Lou Lou."

In an 1853 railroad survey and map, Lieutenant John Mullan spelled the creek and trail "Lou Lou." However, by 1865 the name was shortened to Lolo and is currently the name of a national forest, town, creek, mountain peak, mountain pass, and historic trail in west central Montana.

== Climate ==
St Joseph Peak (Montana) is a nearby peak to the south of Lolo Peak.

Climate data for St Joseph Peak (MT) 46.6003 N, 114.2518 W, Elevation: 8,953 ft (2,729 m) (1991–2020 normals)
| Month | Jan | Feb | Mar | Apr | May | Jun | Jul | Aug | Sep | Oct | Nov | Dec | Year |
|---|---|---|---|---|---|---|---|---|---|---|---|---|---|
| Mean daily maximum °F (°C) | 23.6 (−4.7) | 23.6 (−4.7) | 28.1 (−2.2) | 33.3 (0.7) | 42.4 (5.8) | 50.0 (10.0) | 61.5 (16.4) | 61.7 (16.5) | 53.0 (11.7) | 39.2 (4.0) | 27.5 (−2.5) | 22.2 (−5.4) | 38.8 (3.8) |
| Daily mean °F (°C) | 17.2 (−8.2) | 15.7 (−9.1) | 19.1 (−7.2) | 24.0 (−4.4) | 32.5 (0.3) | 39.6 (4.2) | 49.6 (9.8) | 49.6 (9.8) | 41.7 (5.4) | 30.2 (−1.0) | 21.2 (−6.0) | 16.2 (−8.8) | 29.7 (−1.3) |
| Mean daily minimum °F (°C) | 10.8 (−11.8) | 7.8 (−13.4) | 10.1 (−12.2) | 14.6 (−9.7) | 22.5 (−5.3) | 29.1 (−1.6) | 37.7 (3.2) | 37.6 (3.1) | 30.4 (−0.9) | 21.2 (−6.0) | 14.9 (−9.5) | 10.1 (−12.2) | 20.6 (−6.4) |
| Average precipitation inches (mm) | 7.96 (202) | 6.17 (157) | 6.08 (154) | 4.82 (122) | 4.78 (121) | 4.96 (126) | 1.95 (50) | 1.60 (41) | 2.61 (66) | 4.83 (123) | 7.58 (193) | 7.69 (195) | 61.03 (1,550) |
Source: PRISM Climate Group
