= Woodman School =

Location
- 18470 Highway 12 West; Lolo, Montana 59847; United States
- Coordinates: 46°45′35″N 114°15′08″W

Information
- School type: Public, primary school
- School district: Woodman School District #18
- Grades: K-8
- Language: English
- Colors: Blue & White
- Team name: Wildcats
- Communities served: Lolo
- Website: http://woodmanschool.montana.com/

Woodman School is a small, rural school that was founded in 1892. The school is located on Highway 12 west of Lolo in Missoula County, Montana. There are approximately 50 students at Woodman School.

Woodman School is organized into the following classrooms: Kindergarten; 1–2; 3–4; 5–6; 7–8. The school has eight staff members, including five teachers. The school used to participate in frequent outdoor activities on the neighboring ranch lands and in Lolo National Forest.

The School's most famous graduate, naturalist Bud Moore, recently died.

== History ==
The history of Woodman School dates back all the way to Lewis and Clark who originally explored the area in September 1805. They traveled through and stopped at Travelers Rest for two days, which is approximately 9 miles from Woodman School.

The school was named after the Woodman family. Dan Woodman's daughter died of Rocky Mountain Spotted Tick Fever. He also died of the same disease later in 1891. But, Bill Woodman lived and was nicknamed “Skookum” which means “strong” or “good” in the Salish language. The rest of the Woodman family helped construct the Woodman School in 1892, which remained a one-room school house with one teacher for many years.

The school remained a one-room school with one teacher until 1959, which was when another building was constructed for grades 4–8. There was a shed that the kids would stable the horses they rode to school, and each kid was responsible to bring their own hay for their horses. The rest of the kids would walk to school.

The first time that there was a kindergarten in the Woodman School was in 1984. About 15% of the students have parents that have attended Woodman School as kids. In 1992 Woodman school celebrated its centennial.

== Philosophy ==
“Education should be shaped by the ideals and the goals created and upheld by all members of the school community.” The school has the responsibility of preparing students to be responsible members of a self-governing civilization. It is our duty to adjust the school programs to meet the needs and abilities of each student. The Student will be given an opportunity to be an active participant in the knowledge development and encourage developing a quest for immeasurable data. We should respect each individual student's unique ability to achieve a well-formed existence both in and out of the school setting. Woodman School believes that to help students transform their potential into actuality, their basic, and quality education should enable them to:

- Find joy in learning.
- Communicate ideas, knowledge, thoughts, and feelings.
- Reason critically and creatively.
- Assume social responsibility.
- Further their creative ability.
- Be affective in a changing world.
- Develop personal responsibility
