= KDWG =

- Dillon, Montana; United States
- Frequency: 90.9 MHz
- Branding: Montana Public Radio

Programming
- Format: Public radio
- Affiliations: Montana Public Radio

Ownership
- Owner: University of Montana

History
- First air date: December 4, 2000

Technical information
- Licensing authority: FCC
- Facility ID: 93389
- Class: A
- ERP: 850 watts
- HAAT: −72 meters (−236 ft)
- Transmitter coordinates: 45°12′32.7″N 112°38′17″W

Links
- Public license information: Public file; LMS
- Webcast: Listen live
- Website: www.mtpr.org

KDWG (90.9 FM) is a radio station licensed to serve Dillon, Montana, United States. The station is owned by The University of Montana. It is an affiliate of Montana Public Radio.

The station was assigned the KDWG call letters by the Federal Communications Commission on December 4, 2000.
