= KYLT =

- Missoula, Montana; United States
- Frequency: 1340 kHz
- Branding: 1340 The Lounge

Programming
- Format: Soft rock, Adult standards
- Affiliations: SRN News

Ownership
- Owner: Anderson Radio Broadcasting, Inc.
- Sister stations: KENR, KLYQ, KXDR

History
- First air date: 1955
- Call sign meaning: K Y MissouLa’s Talk (previous format)

Technical information
- Licensing authority: FCC
- Facility ID: 32389
- Class: C
- Power: 1,000 watts (unlimited)
- Transmitter coordinates: 46°52′56″N 113°59′08″W

Links
- Public license information: Public file; LMS
- Website: 1340thelounge.com

KYLT (1340 AM, "1340 KYLT") is a radio station licensed to serve Missoula, Montana. The station is owned by Anderson Radio Broadcasting, Inc. It previously aired a sports format. In November 2022, the station rebranded as "1340 The Lounge" and switched to an adult standards format.

Former logo as a talk station

The station was assigned the KYLT call sign by the Federal Communications Commission.

== Programming ==
Notable local programming included the "Berg in the Morning" show, which aired for one hour each weekday morning. Syndicated programming included sports talk shows from Fox Sports Radio.

== History ==
The station first began broadcasting in 1955, originally operating as a 1,000-watt facility on the frequency of 1340 kHz. In its early decades, the station was a prominent local broadcaster for high school and university athletics, serving as the flagship for a 14-station network that carried the University of Montana Grizzly football games. The station later transitioned through several identities, including a "Solid Gold" oldies format in the late 1980s and a sports-talk format during the early 2000s. In June 2006, KYLT was acquired by Cherry Creek Radio from Fisher Radio Regional Group as part of a 24-station deal with a total reported sale price of $33.3 million.

A significant era of the station’s history was defined by Gene Peterson, a Hall of Fame broadcaster who owned and operated KYLT alongside its FM counterpart (now KZOQ) under the Scottie Broadcasting entity. In June 2006, the station was acquired by Cherry Creek Radio from Fisher Radio Regional Group as part of a $33.3 million deal. More recently, effective June 17, 2022, the station was purchased by Townsquare Media before being immediately divested to Anderson Radio Broadcasting, Inc. to satisfy FCC ownership limits.
