= KHDV =

Radio station in Darby, Montana

- Darby, Montana; United States
- Broadcast area: Hamilton, Montana
- Frequency: 107.9 MHz
- Branding: Rocket 108

Programming
- Format: Classic hits

Ownership
- Owner: Mountain Broadcasting; (Sheila Callahan & Friends, Inc.)
- Sister stations: KMSO

History
- First air date: September 7, 2007
- Call sign meaning: K H DriVe

Technical information
- Licensing authority: FCC
- Facility ID: 166088
- Class: C3
- ERP: 10,000 watts
- HAAT: 110 meters
- Transmitter coordinates: 46°13′46″N 114°14′01″W
- Translator: 103.7 K279CP (Missoula)

Links
- Public license information: Public file; LMS
- Webcast: Listen Live
- Website: rocket108.com

KHDV (107.9 FM, "Rocket 108") is an American FM radio station licensed by the Federal Communications Commission (FCC) to serve the city of Darby, Montana. It airs a classic hits music format.

The license was the result of an auction held January 31, 2006, which awarded the license for a bid of $178,000. The station was granted its construction permit on June 28, 2006, and received permission to begin full power operation on September 6, 2007.

On September 1, 2013, KHDV changed its format from country to classic hits, branded as "The Drive".

KHDV signed off the air on New Year's Eve 2024, as owner Sheila Callahan retired from radio broadcasting. Sister station KMSO 102.5, repeated on K292GH in Hamilton, also signed off.

On December 25, 2025, KHDV returned to the air with a classic hits format, branded as "Rocket 108".

== Previous logo ==
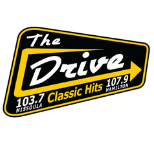
