= KGVW =

Radio station in Belgrade, Montana (1959–2013)

- Belgrade, Montana; United States
- Broadcast area: Gallatin Valley
- Frequency: 640 kHz
- Branding: The Source

Programming
- Format: Defunct (formerly religious)
- Affiliations: Moody Broadcasting Network

Ownership
- Owner: Gallatin Valley Witness Inc.
- Sister stations: KCMM

History
- First air date: 1959
- Last air date: June 18, 2013
- Call sign meaning: Gallatin Valley Witness

Technical information
- Facility ID: 11011
- Class: B
- Power: 10,000 watts (day); 1,000 watts (night)
- Transmitter coordinates: 45°46′15″N 111°13′26″W

KGVW (640 AM) was a radio station licensed to serve Belgrade, Montana. The station was owned by Gallatin Valley Witness Inc. It aired a religious radio format including some programming from the Moody Broadcasting Network.

Notable on-air personnel included operations manager Lee Stevens (Williams) and Roger Torrenga.

The station was assigned the KGVW call letters by the Federal Communications Commission (FCC) on January 31, 2007.

The station's license was surrendered to the FCC by the licensee on June 18, 2013, and the FCC cancelled the license effective July 1, 2013.
