= KYSS-FM =

Radio station in Missoula, Montana

- Missoula, Montana; United States
- Broadcast area: Missoula, Montana
- Frequency: 94.9 MHz
- Branding: 94.9 KYSS-FM

Programming
- Format: Country
- Affiliations: Compass Media Networks; United Stations Radio Networks

Ownership
- Owner: Townsquare Media; (Townsquare License, LLC)
- Sister stations: KBAZ, KGGL, KGRZ, KGVO, KMPT, KZOQ-FM

History
- First air date: May 11, 1969

Technical information
- Licensing authority: FCC
- Facility ID: 71759
- Class: C
- ERP: 63,000 watts
- HAAT: 729 meters
- Translator: 98.1 K251CH (Seeley Lake)

Links
- Public license information: Public file; LMS
- Webcast: Listen Live
- Website: kyssfm.com

KYSS-FM (94.9 MHz) is a commercial radio station in Missoula, Montana, airing a country music format. The station is also one of two Country outlets in Missoula competing for listeners, the other being KGGL. Despite the "KISS" sounding call letters and it having once been owned by Clear Channel Communications, it has no relation to the Top 40 branding. It also shares the same Buck Owens-trademarked red, white & blue guitar logo as KNIX-FM/Phoenix, Arizona.

== History ==
KYSS-FM came to air May 11, 1969. It was owned by the Garden City Broadcasting Corporation alongside KYSS (930 AM, now KMPT) and broadcast a beautiful music format on 100.1 MHz. In 1973, the FCC approved a major power increase for KYSS to 100,000 watts at 94.9 FM. The format changed to country, which it currently airs today.

In October 2007, a deal was reached for KYSS to be acquired by GAP Broadcasting II LLC (Samuel Weller, president) from Clear Channel Communications as part of a 57 station deal with a total reported sale price of $74.78 million. What eventually became GapWest Broadcasting was folded into Townsquare Media on August 13, 2010.
