= KZOQ-FM =

Radio station in Missoula, Montana

KZOQ
- Missoula, Montana; United States
- Broadcast area: Missoula, Montana
- Frequency: 100.1 MHz
- Branding: Z100

Programming
- Format: Classic rock

Ownership
- Owner: Townsquare Media; (Townsquare License, LLC)
- Sister stations: KBAZ, KGGL, KGRZ, KGVO, KMPT, KYSS-FM

History
- First air date: May 4, 1979
- Former call signs: KYLT-FM (1979–1982); KZOQ (1982–1991)

Technical information
- Licensing authority: FCC
- Facility ID: 32385
- Class: C1
- ERP: 13,500 watts
- HAAT: 641 meters
- Transmitter coordinates: 46°48′09″N 113°58′21″W

Links
- Public license information: Public file; LMS
- Webcast: Listen Live
- Website: z100missoula.com

KZOQ-FM (100.1 MHz, "Z100") is a commercial radio station in Missoula, Montana. The station is owned by Townsquare Media and licensed to Townsquare License, LLC. KZOQ-FM airs a classic rock music format, featuring The Brian and Chris Show in the mornings with Brian Lee and Chris Wolfe. Z100 is Missoula's heritage rock station, being one of the big four, the first four commercial FM stations to come to Missoula. Z100 played album rock with a 50/50 mix of classic and current rock music. For a time in the 1990s, Z100's music mix leaned towards alternative and pop rock, giving it a Modern Adult sound at times. With 96.3 The Blaze coming in, filling the shoes for new rock, Z100 became classic rock on the same day the Blaze premiered. For years, Z100 aired the popular Craig & Al morning show before it moved to KYSS FM in 2004,
