= KMPT =

Radio station in East Missoula, Montana

- East Missoula, Montana; United States
- Broadcast area: Missoula, Montana
- Frequency: 930 kHz
- Branding: 930 AM 99.7 FM KMPT

Programming
- Format: Talk
- Affiliations: ABC News Radio; Premiere Networks; Radio America; Salem Radio Network; Westwood One

Ownership
- Owner: Townsquare Media; (Townsquare License, LLC)
- Sister stations: KBAZ, KGGL, KGRZ, KGVO, KYSS-FM, KZOQ-FM

History
- First air date: June 27, 1959
- Former call signs: KYSS (1959–1984); KLCY (1984–2008)
- Call sign meaning: "Missoula's Progressive Talk" (former programming)

Technical information
- Licensing authority: FCC
- Facility ID: 71754
- Class: D
- Power: 5,000 watts day; 22 watts night
- Transmitter coordinates: 46°51′57″N 114°04′57″W
- Translator: 99.7 K259DD (East Missoula)

Links
- Public license information: Public file; LMS
- Webcast: Listen Live
- Website: 930kmpt.com

KMPT (930 AM) is a radio station licensed to serve East Missoula, Montana. The station is owned by Townsquare Media. It airs a talk radio format. Currently branded as "930 AM KMPT," the station operates as a conservative talk leader in Missoula, featuring syndicated programming from networks such as Salem and Premiere. The station serves as a local affiliate for the Bobcat Radio Sports Network, providing live coverage of Montana State University athletics to listeners in Western Montana.

== History ==
The station first signed on the air on June 27, 1959, under the original call letters KYSS. It was established by Treasure State Broadcasting, which had previously secured the construction permit for the station under the temporary designation KDOO in 1958. During its early decades, the station was a pioneer in local music broadcasting, launching its FM counterpart (KYSS-FM) in 1969 to expand its reach in the Missoula market.

KYSS-FM was started by the station in 1969. In 1984, the station rebranded as KLCY, adopting a nostalgia and adult standards format that it maintained for over two decades. In late 2007, Gap Broadcasting II LLC, led by Erik Hellum, reached an agreement to acquire the station from Clear Channel Communications as part of a 57-station transaction valued at $74.78 million. Following this acquisition, the station officially transitioned to its current KMPT call letters on January 1, 2008.

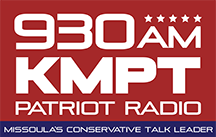
Former logo before 99.7 translator sign on

== Ownership ==
In October 2007, a deal was reached for the station (then known as KLCY) to be acquired by GAP Broadcasting II LLC (Erik Hellum, president) from Clear Channel Communications as part of a 57 station deal with a total reported sale price of $74.78 million. What eventually became GapWest Broadcasting was folded into Townsquare Media on August 13, 2010. The merger, finalized on August 13, 2010, was technically a "roll-up" of three separate entities—Townsquare Media, GAP Radio Broadcasting, and GAP West Broadcasting—all of which were already majority-owned by the private equity firm Oaktree Capital Management. This consolidation expanded Townsquare's reach to 171 radio stations across 36 markets, making it the fourth-largest radio owner in the United States at the time.

The Missoula radio market saw further disruption on June 17, 2022, when Townsquare Media acquired Cherry Creek Media for $18.75 million. To comply with FCC ownership caps following this massive addition, Townsquare was required to divest several stations, including KMPT’s sister station KENR-FM, to Anderson Broadcasting and other local non-profits.
