= KHKM =

Radio station in Hamilton, Montana

Coordinates: 46°30′34″N 113°58′45″W

- Hamilton, Montana; United States
- Broadcast area: Missoula, Montana
- Frequency: 98.7 MHz
- Branding: 98.7 The Beat

Programming
- Format: Classic hip hop

Ownership
- Owner: Gerdes & Associates

History
- First air date: May 1, 1998 (as KBEB)
- Former call signs: KBEB (1998–1999); KXDR (1999–2012); KBQQ (2012)

Technical information
- Licensing authority: FCC
- Facility ID: 76981
- Class: C1
- ERP: 100,000 watts
- HAAT: 127 meters (417 ft)

Links
- Public license information: Public file; LMS
- Webcast: Listen live
- Website: KHKM Online

KHKM (98.7 FM) is a non-commercial educational radio station licensed to Hamilton, Montana, serving the Missoula, Montana, area. KHKM airs a classic hip hop format.

== History ==
In January 2012, KBQQ and its oldies format moved from 106.7 FM Pinesdale, Montana, to 98.7 FM Hamilton, Montana, swapping frequencies with CHR-formatted KXDR. In May 2012, KBQQ changed its call sign to KHKM and changed its format to classic country, branded as "98.7 The Hawk".

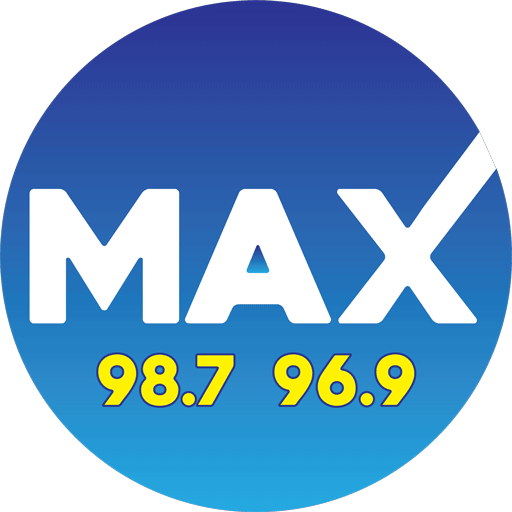
Logo as Max 98.7 & 96.9

On September 14, 2018, KHKM changed its format from classic country to variety hits, branded as "Max 98.7 & 96.9".

On June 14, 2022, it was announced that K245AP would drop its simulcast with KHKM and would be replaced with the "Zoo-FM" branding, which would move from KENR, as KHKM was being sold to Legacy Broadcasting and would change its format to its Today's Christian Country network.

On November 1, 2024, KHKM was purchased by longtime Salt Lake City programmer "Mike Summers" Gerdes and switched its format to AAA (Adult Album Alternative) music, branded as "98.7 The Hawk".

On April 28, 2025, KHKM changed their format from adult album alternative to classic hip hop, branded as "98.7 The Beat".
