= Montana Public Radio =

Public radio network in Montana

- Type: Public Radio Network
- Country: United States
- Broadcast area: Montana

Programming
- Affiliations: National Public Radio; American Public Media; Public Radio Exchange

Ownership
- Owner: University of Montana

History
- Launch date: 1965

Links
- Webcast: Available on website
- Website: www.mtpr.org

Montana Public Radio (MTPR) is a network of public radio stations serving the U.S. state of Montana, primarily the western part of the state. The network is owned by the University of Montana, and its studios are located in the Performing Arts and Radio-TV (PARTV) Building on the university's campus in southeast Missoula, with a satellite facility on the campus of Great Falls College Montana State University in south-central Great Falls. The network is affiliated with National Public Radio. Programming originates from flagship station KUFM (89.1 FM) in Missoula.

== History ==
Montana Public Radio began in 1965 when KUFM in Missoula signed on as a 10-watt campus radio station. In 1974, it became a member of National Public Radio.

Starting in the late 1970s, it began building translators across western Montana. Its first full-power satellite, in Great Falls, signed on in 1984. In 1999, a signal extension project funded mostly by a federal grant made it possible to sign on new stations in Kalispell and Hamilton and upgrade translators in Butte and Helena to full-power stations.

Montana Public Radio's Browning transmitter, KUFB, was built in late 2024 as part of a partnership with the Blackfeet Tribe that also saw the expansion of the tribe's radio station, Thunder Radio, into a five-station network.

== Stations ==
Montana Public Radio consists of ten full-power stations and several translators:

Call sign	Frequency	City of license	Facility ID	ERP (W)	Height (m (ft))	Transmitter coordinates
KUFB	88.9 FM	Browning, Montana	766229	700	127 m (417 ft)	48°42′22.5″N 113°6′1.8″W
KAPC	91.3 FM	Butte, Montana	66630	800	571 m (1,873 ft)	46°0′26.7″N 112°26′33.1″W
KUMD	90.9 FM	Deer Lodge, Montana	767108	650	231 m (758 ft)	46°30′47.7″N 112°40′22.6″W
KDWG	90.9 FM	Dillon, Montana	93389	850	−72 m (−236 ft)	45°12′32.7″N 112°38′17″W
KGPR	89.9 FM	Great Falls, Montana	24955	9,500	90 m (300 ft)	47°32′22.8″N 111°17′8.9″W
KUFN	91.9 FM	Hamilton, Montana	59812	900	130 m (430 ft)	46°13′45.7″N 114°14′4.3″W
KUHM	91.7 FM	Helena, Montana	66628	910	232 m (761 ft)	46°46′10.7″N 112°1′24.9″W
KUKL	90.1 FM	Kalispell, Montana	66627	1,830	786 m (2,579 ft)	48°30′21.8″N 114°20′52.4″W
KUFL	90.5 FM	Libby, Montana	173730	1,000	−318 m (−1,043 ft)	48°22′44.8″N 115°33′32.5″W
KUFM (Note: Flagship station; for this station's translators, see KUFM (FM) § Translators)	89.1 FM	Missoula, Montana	69239	14,500	754 m (2,474 ft)	47°1′57.7″N 113°59′32.3″W
KPJH	89.5 FM	Polson, Montana	173197	130	570 m (1,870 ft)	47°46′24.7″N 114°16′8.4″W
KUMS	89.7 FM	White Sulphur Springs, Montana	764912	150	74 m (243 ft)	46°27′44″N 110°51′25″W
