= NBC Montana =

Network of western Montana NBC affiliates

- Missoula, Kalispell, Butte, and Bozeman, Montana; United States
- Channels: Virtual: 13, 9, 6

Programming
- Affiliations: x.1: NBC; for others, see § Subchannels

Ownership
- Owner: Sinclair Broadcast Group; (Sinclair Media Licensee, LLC)

History
- First air date: July 1, 1954, with the launch of KGVO-TV (now KECI-TV) in Missoula
- Former affiliations: CBS (primary 1954–1965, secondary 1965–1966 and 1976–1984); DuMont (secondary, 1954–1956); ABC (secondary, 1954–1976 and 1984–1989)

Links
- Website: www.nbcmontana.com
- For technical information, see § Stations.

NBC Montana is a regional network of three television stations in western Montana, United States, affiliated with NBC and owned by Sinclair Broadcast Group. It is headquartered in Missoula and serves as the NBC affiliate for the Missoula and Butte markets.

The network comprises flagship KECI-TV (channel 13) in Missoula; full-power satellites KTVM-TV (channel 6) in Butte and KCFW-TV (channel 9) in Kalispell; and low-power satellite KDBZ-CD (channel 6) in Bozeman. Most network operations, including news production, are based at KECI's studios on West Main Street in Missoula, with bureaus on Old Milwaukee Drive in Bozeman and First Avenue in Kalispell. The stations air the same programming, but KTVM and KCFW air separate commercials and legal identifications. KDBZ is a straight simulcast of KTVM. NBC Montana's reach is further extended by 25 translators in western Montana and Idaho.

The main station, KECI, began broadcasting in 1954 as KGVO-TV. Regional coverage became a reality in the 1960s with the installation of transmitters in Butte and Kalispell. The stations have been sole NBC affiliates since 1989. Sinclair purchased the group in 2017 as part of its acquisition of Bonten Media Group.

== History ==
=== Early years ===
On March 11, 1953, the Federal Communications Commission (FCC) granted Mosby's Incorporated, owner of KGVO (1290 AM) in Missoula, a construction permit for a new television station on channel 13 in Missoula. Construction began in November 1953 on a road to the approved mountaintop transmitter facility, the first of its kind in the state and at the highest elevation of any television transmitter of the period in the northwestern United States; while two stations had gone on the air in Butte and a third in Billings, neither built their transmitters atop mountains.

KGVO-TV began telecasting on July 1, 1954. Originally, the station was a primary CBS affiliate, owing to its radio sister's long affiliation with CBS radio, but also carried programming from ABC and DuMont; DuMont ceased its existence as a network in 1955. While the studios were originally at the transmitter site, owner Arthur Mosby purchased an American Legion hall on West Main Street in downtown Missoula that had been gutted by fire and renovated it to serve as new studios. On December 1, 1956, KGVO moved to the new site and concurrently changed its call letters to KMSO-TV, representing Missoula's airport code. By 1957, KMSO had added a secondary affiliation with NBC. Mosby sold KGVO radio to Dale Moore in 1959 but held on to KMSO-TV until 1964, when Moore bought channel 13 as well; upon taking over, he changed its call letters back to KGVO-TV. Under Moore's ownership, KGVO-TV switched its primary affiliation to NBC in 1965, though it still carried some CBS and ABC programming. The transmitter was destroyed by fire in November 1966; the FCC permitted the installation of two interim translators to get the station back on air until the TV Mountain facility could be reconstructed.

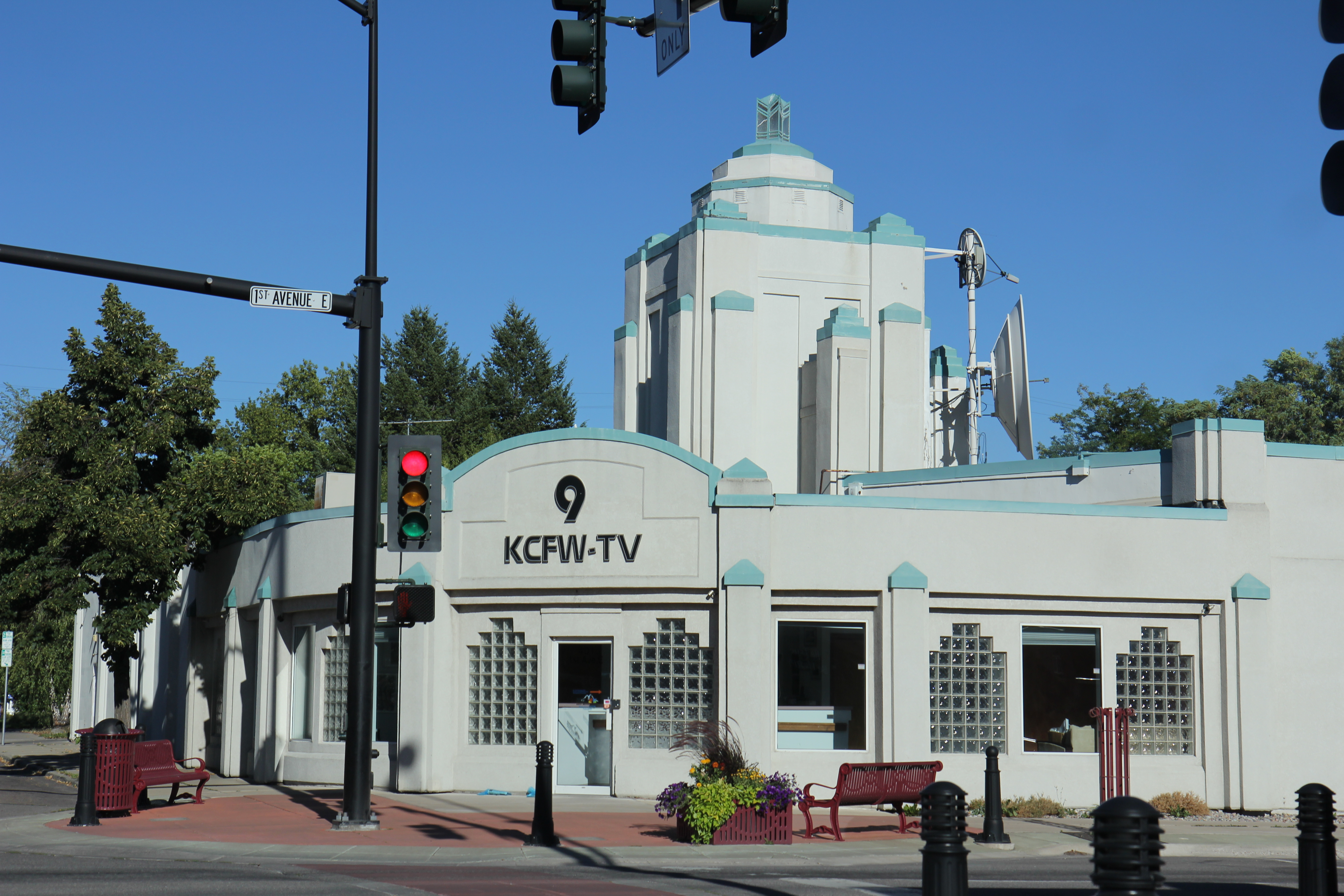
KCFW-TV's Kalispell studios and offices

Additionally, the station pursued a policy of regional expansion. In 1965, it built a 100-watt translator on channel 9 in Kalispell. The Flathead had been without a local station since the folding of KGEZ-TV/KULR in 1959. That December, the FCC simultaneously approved a channel 6 translator for KGVO-TV in Butte as well as a translator for Butte's local station, CBS affiliate KXLF-TV, in Missoula. On June 10, 1968, the Kalispell translator was upgraded to a full-power semi-satellite under the call letters KCFW-TV, while the Butte translator was replaced with full-power semi-satellite KTVM in May 1970. In 1976, primary coverage of ABC programs shifted from KGVO-TV to KXLF and its Missoula satellite, KPAX-TV.

=== Eagle Communications era ===
Dale Moore's Western Broadcasting Company reached a deal to sell KGVO-TV, KCFW, and KTVM to Eagle Communications, Inc.—a company formed by former The Ed Sullivan Show producer Robert Precht and Advance Communications, owner of KFBB-TV in Great Falls—in 1977. Despite a protest from a citizens' group, Montanans for Quality Television, the deal received FCC approval in September 1978, and on November 1, KGVO-TV became KECI-TV. The new owners pledged to improve news coverage, in part under a pact with the citizens' group. The Eagle stations also aired Sesame Street for three years from 1978 to 1981, dropping the program due to a lack of underwriters.

Eagle demonstrated an increased commitment to the Butte area, which had never been served by any specific local programming, even after the launch of KTVM. After expressing interest in establishing a Butte office in 1978, the station did so in 1982 and began producing local news reports for inclusion in KECI's newscasts. Precht Communications acquired full control of Eagle Communications by 1981. NBC signed primary affiliation agreements with the Eagle stations in 1983; though they were dual NBC–CBS affiliates on paper, the best CBS shows aired on KXLF–KPAX, and CBS had turned down Eagle's bid for primary affiliation with that network to protect its relationship with the other stations in the Montana Television Network (MTN).

In 1984, KXLF–KPAX and the other MTN stations became full-time CBS outlets. As a result, most ABC programs moved to the Eagle network. Between 1984 and 1989, KECI aired an 11 p.m. late local newscast—highly unusual for the Mountain Time Zone (most network affiliates in the Mountain Time Zone aired their late newscasts at 10 p.m.). While this allowed KECI to clear more ABC programs, it created further scheduling headaches and put its late news at a disadvantage. Viewers cited confusion over the availability of programs, and returning the late news to 10 p.m. allowed Eagle to restore The Tonight Show and Saturday Night Live to its lineup en route to becoming a sole NBC affiliate. A full-time ABC outlet for Missoula, KTMF (channel 23), was established in 1990.

The 1980s also saw Eagle seek to increase its presence in Bozeman. It first attempted to buy the construction permit for KCTZ (channel 7), which had sought an ABC affiliation only to have its hopes dashed by Eagle's June 1984 acquisition of the ABC rights in the Missoula–Butte market. The opposition of two local residents and radio station owners caused the deal to languish for 16 months at the FCC until the green light was given in January 1986, and the deal fell apart when the commission agreed with a petitioner who claimed the purchase was duplicative. When KCTZ began broadcasting, it caused interference issues to KTVM's signal in the Bozeman area. In 1989, Eagle purchased the construction permit for low-power K42BZ, which took to the air as a translator for KTVM in January 1990. In 2002, after the introduction of the Class A television service, the FCC approved K42BZ to be designated as a Class A station.

=== Lamco, BlueStone, Bonten and Sinclair ownership ===
In 1997, Precht sold the Eagle system to Lamco Communications, which in turn sold its stations to BlueStone Television in 2004. Bonten Media Group acquired the BlueStone stations in 2007.

The 2000s also saw digital conversion for the network, as KCFW and KTVM began broadcasting in digital on February 1 and 28, 2002; all three full-power stations shut down their analog signals on June 12, 2009, the official digital transition date. After the transition, all three stations abandoned their ultra high frequency (UHF) pre-transition digital channels (for KECI-TV, KCFW-TV, and KTVM-TV, respectively, 40, 38, and 33) to return to their very high frequency (VHF) channels of 13, 9, and 6. While digital broadcasts had also begun in Bozeman by the June 12 deadline, the low-power K42BZ was not required to discontinue analog service and planned to remain on the air through the end of 2009.

On April 21, 2017, Sinclair Broadcast Group announced its intent to purchase the Bonten stations for $240 million. The sale was completed September 1.

== News operations ==
Historically, the stations aired a mix of local and regional news programming. From its outset in 1968, KCFW produced its own early evening newscast; it was not until 1982 that one was established at KTVM in Butte. KTVM also had a Bozeman news bureau from 1983 to 1985. By 1993, the three Eagle network stations aired regional newscasts from Missoula at 5 and 10 p.m. and local news programs for their specific areas at 6 p.m. That year, the company underwent a major restructuring of its news operations, untangling the stations from each other to produce local 6 and 10 p.m. programs, and it announced the addition of a fourth local news service for Bozeman, upgrading K42BZ into a low-power station with its own local news. The weekend newscasts for Bozeman were that city's first; the only other news operation in the city, at KCTZ, aired on weekdays only.

The Bozeman newscast debuted October 4, 1993. Just 25 days later, citing costs and the fact that the Butte local operation had never made money, Eagle opted to shutter the Butte operation and originate news for both areas from Bozeman, firing the 15 news and production staffers it had in Butte. At the same time, KECI anchor Jill Valley defected to crosstown competitor KPAX, causing the station to plunge in the ratings—especially in Missoula itself.

KECI debuted a morning newscast, Montana Today, in 1997. Originally 35 minutes in length, it grew to an hour in 1999. In 2004, KECI added a 5 p.m. local newscast, giving the station two early evening news programs, seeking to fill the void created when KTMF disbanded its news department of that period. Montana Today expanded to two hours in 2012.

In 2017, when then-congressional candidate Greg Gianforte got into a physical altercation with Ben Jacobs of The Guardian, NBC Montana initially refused to report the story or provide coverage to NBC News and the network's affiliates. New York magazine reported that news director Julie Weindel told NBC News that her station would not cover the story for the network, calling Jacobs "a reporter for a politically biased publication" and telling NBC, "You are on your own for this."

=== Notable former on-air staff ===
- Savannah Guthrie – weekend anchor at KTVM in Butte, October 1993; had worked at station 10 days when the Butte news operation was closed
- Dari Nowkhah — sports director for KCFW
- Meg Oliver — reporter and anchor at KCFW

== Stations ==
=== Main stations ===
NBC Montana stations
Station	City of license	Channel	VC	FID	ERP	HAAT	Transmitter coordinates	First air date	Former call signs	Public license information
KECI-TV	Missoula	20 (UHF)	13	18084	950 kW	610 m (2,001 ft)	47°1′4″N 114°0′50″W	July 1, 1954	KGVO-TV (1954–1956, 1964–1978); KMSO-TV (1956–1964)	Public file; LMS
KCFW-TV	Kalispell	17 (UHF)	9	18079	400 kW	846.25 m (2,776 ft)	48°0′48″N 114°21′58″W	June 10, 1968	—N/a	Public file LMS
KTVM-TV	Butte	20 (UHF)	6	18066	1,000 kW	591.3 m (1,940 ft)	46°0′27″N 112°26′33″W	May 12, 1970	KTVM (1970–2009)	Public file; LMS
KDBZ-CD	Bozeman	29 (UHF)	6	18083	15 kW	205.8 m (675 ft)	45°38′19.84″N 111°15′57.49″W	January 1990	K42BZ (1990–2011); K42BZ-D (2011–2014)	Public file; LMS

=== Translators ===
- Basin, MT: K11LA-D (KTVM-TV)
- Boulder, MT: K13KP-D (KTVM-TV)
- Dillon, MT: K25OA-D (KTVM-TV)
- Drummond, MT: K26KA-D (KECI-TV)
- Eureka, MT: K02AO-D (KCFW-TV)
- Ferndale, MT: K24ID-D (KCFW-TV)
- Frenchtown, MT: K14IU-D (KECI-TV)
- Hot Springs, MT: K05AH-D (KECI-TV)
- Lake McDonald, MT: K05FC-D (KCFW-TV)
- Libby: K18KD-D (KCFW-TV)
- Philipsburg, MT: K25LF-D (KECI-TV)
- Plains–Paradise, MT: K11JP-D (KECI-TV)
- Polaris, MT: K09MY-D (KTVM-TV)
- Polson, MT: K16GJ-D (KECI-TV)
- Sula, MT: K05ML-D (KTVM-TV)
- Superior, MT: K03DT-D (KECI-TV)
- Thompson Falls, MT: K11FQ-D (KECI-TV), K25OS-D (KECI-TV)
- Trout Creek, MT: K12QT-D (KECI-TV)
- Virginia City, MT: K10HL-D (KTVM-TV)
- Weeksville, MT: K29ID-D
- Leadore, ID: K16KO-D (KECI-TV)
- Salmon, ID: K11TY-D (KECI-TV), K30PW-D (KECI-TV)
- Tendoy–Leadore, ID: K27MM-D (KECI-TV)

== Subchannels ==
The stations' signals are multiplexed:

NBC Montana subchannels
Subchannel			Res.	Short name			Programming
KECI-TV	KCFW-TV	KTVM-TV; KDBZ-CD	Res.	KECI-TV	KCFW-TV	KTVM-TV; KDBZ-CD	Programming
13.1	9.1	6.1	1080i	KECI-DT	KCFW-DT	KTVM-DT	NBC
13.2	9.2	6.2	480i	COMET			Comet
13.3	9.3	6.3	480i	CHARGE!			Charge!
13.4	9.4	6.4	480i	ROAR		TBD	Roar
13.5	9.5	6.5	480i	TheNest			The Nest (soon)
