= KGVO (AM) =

- Missoula, Montana; United States
- Broadcast area: Missoula, Montana
- Frequency: 1290 kHz
- Branding: 98.3 and 1290 KGVO

Programming
- Format: News/talk
- Affiliations: Fox News Radio; Genesis Communications Network; Premiere Networks; Westwood One; Montana Grizzlies football; Montana Grizzlies men's basketball

Ownership
- Owner: Townsquare Media; (Townsquare License, LLC)
- Sister stations: KBAZ, KGGL, KGRZ, KMPT, KYSS-FM, KZOQ-FM

History
- First air date: March 17, 1931
- Former frequencies: 1420 kHz (1931–1932); 1200 kHz (1932–1936); 1260 kHz (1936–1941)
- Call sign meaning: "Key to Golden Values and Opportunities"

Technical information
- Licensing authority: FCC
- Facility ID: 71751
- Class: B
- Power: 5,000 watts
- Transmitter coordinates: 46°49′47″N 114°04′45″W
- Translator: 98.3 K252FP (Missoula)

Links
- Public license information: Public file; LMS
- Webcast: Listen live
- Website: newstalkkgvo.com

KGVO (1290 kHz) is an AM radio station licensed to serve Missoula, Montana. The station is owned by Townsquare Media. It airs a news/talk format.

== History ==
The station was founded by Arthur James Mosby, an electrician and local pioneer who constructed the station's first transmitter using a diagram and parts list sourced from an amateur radio magazine. KGVO officially began broadcasting on January 18, 1931, becoming the first radio station in Missoula and only the second in the state of Montana. Its original call letters stood for "Great Valley of Ours," reflecting the station's focus on serving the Bitterroot and Missoula valleys. In 1935, Mosby successfully petitioned the CBS Radio Network to accept KGVO as an affiliate, bringing national news and entertainment to Western Montana. The station originally operated at 1420 kHz with just 100 watts of power before the Federal Radio Commission authorized a move to 1200 kHz and granted unlimited hours of operation in May 1932. By 1954, the success of the radio station allowed Mosby to launch Missoula's first television station, KGVO-TV (now KECI-TV), which initially shared studios with the radio operation.

KGVO is currently owned by Townsquare Media and serves as the flagship for a robust news-talk format that dominates the local ratings. The station’s programming lineup features heavy hitters in conservative talk, including The Clay Travis & Buck Sexton Show and The Dave Ramsey Show. Additionally, KGVO is a link for regional sports, as the long-time primary affiliate for the Montana Grizzlies football and basketball radio networks.

Until 2017, KGVO simulcast on KGVO-FM at 101.5 FM, which was used to fill in the gaps when the AM station adjusted its coverage at night. However, on February 2, 2017, KGVO-FM broke off to air an alternative rock format as KAMM-FM. KGVO then began simulcasting on a low-powered translator at 98.3 FM, and Hamilton's KLYQ began simulcasting KGVO.

== Ownership ==
In October 2007, a deal was reached for KGVO to be acquired by GAP Broadcasting II LLC (Samuel Weller, president) from Clear Channel Communications as part of a 57 station deal with a total reported sale price of $74.78 million. What eventually became GapWest Broadcasting was folded into Townsquare Media on August 13, 2010.
