= KLYQ =

- Hamilton, Montana; United States
- Broadcast area: Missoula, Montana
- Frequency: 1240 kHz
- Branding: 1240 KLYQ

Programming
- Format: News/Talk
- Affiliations: Fox News Radio

Ownership
- Owner: Anderson Radio Broadcasting, Inc.
- Sister stations: KENR, KXDR, KYLT

History
- First air date: 1961

Technical information
- Licensing authority: FCC
- Facility ID: 4699
- Class: C
- Power: 1,000 watts
- Transmitter coordinates: 46°15′22″N 114°9′45″W

Links
- Public license information: Public file; LMS
- Webcast: Listen Live
- Website: klyq.com

KLYQ (1240 AM) is a radio station broadcasting a news/talk format. Licensed to Hamilton, Montana, United States, the station is currently owned by Anderson Radio Broadcasting, Inc. KLYQ has studios at 320 North First Street in Hamilton, Montana.

The station was assigned the KLYQ call sign by the Federal Communications Commission.

The station previously aired oldies, but on February 2, 2017 became a simulcast of Missoula's KGVO, albeit with separate branding.

== Previous logo ==
(KLYQ's logo under former news/talk format)
