= KGGL =

- Missoula, Montana; United States
- Broadcast area: Missoula, Montana
- Frequency: 93.3 MHz (HD Radio)
- Branding: Eagle 93.3

Programming
- Format: Country
- Subchannels: HD2: Top 40 (CHR) "96.9 Zoo FM"; HD3: Alternative rock "Alt 95.7"
- Affiliations: Premiere Networks; Westwood One

Ownership
- Owner: Townsquare Media; (Townsquare License, LLC)
- Sister stations: KBAZ; KGRZ; KGVO; KMPT; KYSS-FM; KZOQ-FM

History
- First air date: April 29, 1977
- Former call signs: KDXT (1977–1995)
- Call sign meaning: "Eagle"

Technical information
- Licensing authority: FCC
- Facility ID: 63874
- Class: C
- ERP: 43,000 watts
- HAAT: 777 meters (2,549 ft)
- Translators: HD2: 96.9 K245AP (Missoula); HD3: 95.7 K239AP (Missoula)

Links
- Public license information: Public file; LMS
- Webcast: Listen live; HD2: Listen live; HD3: Listen live
- Website: eagle933.com; HD2: 969zoofm.com; HD3: alternativemissoula.com

KGGL (93.3 FM, "Eagle 93.3") is a commercial radio station in Missoula, Montana, airing a country music format. It is owned by Townsquare Media.

== History ==
=== KDXT ===
On October 15, 1975, Rex Jensen submitted an application to the Federal Communications Commission (FCC) for a construction permit to establish a new radio station operating on 93.3 MHz in Missoula, with its transmitter located on Big Sky Mountain. The FCC granted the permit on May 25, 1976, dismissing concerns from several local broadcasters who argued that the new station could interfere with their operations. While the station was intended to launch that fall, equipment delivery and bad weather in the eastern United States prompted the project to be shelved for the winter; KDXT made its debut on April 29, 1977. Having been transferred to the Jensen Broadcasting Company (owned by Rex and his brother Jack), the station started with an automated rock/adult contemporary hybrid format.

The Jensens sold the station in February 1979 to a joint venture with Robert E. Ingstad of North Dakota, who became the sole owner in 1980 before KDXT and sister station KGRZ (1450 AM) were sold to Wind Point 1970 Holding Company, which was owned by the S.C. Johnson Company, in 1982. The two stations were then sold to Sunbrook Communications in 1986; during this time, the station dominated the Missoula radio market.

=== KGGL ===
Sunbrook sold its radio properties—ten in Montana and a pair in Wenatchee, Washington—to Seattle-based Fisher Broadcasting in 1994, with Sunbrook becoming a division of Fisher after the sale was completed. With the contemporary hit format long associated with KDXT in a national slump, Fisher opted to make a major change. It flipped the station to country as KGGL, taking on established country outlet KYSS, in September 1995. This left Missoula without a station in the contemporary hit radio format. The format change was a successful one: the fall 2005 Eastlan radio ratings for Missoula showed KGGL tied with public radio station KUFM and beating third-place KYSS.

In a 24-station sale that was only partially completed, Fisher sold many of its small-market radio properties to Cherry Creek Radio in 2006 in order to fund an expansion into Spanish-language television in major Pacific Northwest markets. The 24 stations contributed just one-fourth of the radio division's revenue, with Fisher's three Seattle stations comprising the rest.

Effective June 17, 2022, Cherry Creek Radio sold KGGL as part of a 42 station/21 translator package to Townsquare Media for $18.75 million.
