= KFGM-FM =

- Frenchtown, Montana; United States
- Broadcast area: Missoula, Montana
- Frequency: 101.5 MHz
- Branding: Missoula Community Radio

Programming
- Format: Community radio

Ownership
- Owner: Missoula Community Radio

History
- First air date: 2007
- Former call signs: KXGZ (2007–2009); KVWE (2009–2012); KGVO-FM (2012–2016); KAMM-FM (2016–2022)
- Call sign meaning: "For the Good of Missoula"

Technical information
- Licensing authority: FCC
- Facility ID: 166027
- Class: C1
- ERP: 3,600 watts
- HAAT: 637 meters (2,090 ft)
- Transmitter coordinates: 46°48′08″N 113°58′21″W

Links
- Public license information: Public file; LMS
- Webcast: Listen live
- Website: www.1015kfgm.org

KFGM-FM (101.5 FM) is a radio station licensed to serve Frenchtown, Montana. The station is owned by a nonprofit, Missoula Community Radio, with studios in the Missoula Public Library and a transmitter on Mount Dean Stone.

== History ==
The station signed on in 2007 as KXGZ "Grizz Country 101.5", a country music format with added coverage of Montana Grizzlies athletics simulcast with KGVO (1290 AM). The station was assigned the KVWE call letters by the Federal Communications Commission on March 25, 2009, when the station changed to adult contemporary as "The View". This was dropped on March 1, 2012, when the station changed to simulcasting KGVO's news-talk format and adopted the call sign KGVO-FM. The station changed its call sign to KAMM-FM on December 15, 2016, in a prelude to a format flip: on February 2, 2017, KGVO's FM simulcast moved to translator 98.3 K252FP and KLYQ on February 2 as the renamed KAMM-FM flipped to alternative rock as "Alt 101.5".

On June 17, 2022, owner Townsquare Media announced that it would move the "Alternative Missoula" branding to 95.7 K239AP in Missoula—fed by KGGL's third HD Radio sub-channel—as KAMM-FM would be donated to Missoula Community Radio, which moved its programming from 105.5 KFGM-LP. The donation was made as part of required divestitures for Townsquare's acquisition of Cherry Creek Media. KFGM-LP had begun broadcasting on January 1, 2017, and moved into a space at the Missoula Public Library, shared with Missoula Community Access Television, simultaneous with the frequency change; MCR had been identified because a Townsquare representative and one of KFGM's founders both had kids on the same lacrosse team.
