= KKVU =

Radio station in Stevensville–Missoula, Montana

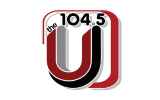
- Stevensville, Montana; United States
- Broadcast area: Missoula, Montana
- Frequency: 104.5 MHz (HD Radio)
- Branding: 104.5 the U

Programming
- Format: Adult top 40
- Subchannels: HD2: K-Love; HD3: Sports "ESPN MT"

Ownership
- Owner: Missoula Broadcasting Company, LLC

History
- First air date: May 5, 2005
- Call sign meaning: Station branded as "K-View"

Technical information
- Licensing authority: FCC
- Facility ID: 162327
- Class: C0
- ERP: 15,000 watts
- HAAT: 635 meters (2,083 ft)
- Transmitter coordinates: 46°48′05.7″N 113°58′25.4″W
- Translators: 93.7 K229BU (Missoula, relays HD2); 102.9 K275BS (Missoula, relays HD3); 105.3 K287AW (Hamilton)

Links
- Public license information: Public file; LMS
- Webcast: Listen live
- Website: www.u1045.com; HD3: www.espnmontana.com

KKVU (104.5 FM, "104.5 the U") is a commercial radio station licensed to Stevensville, Montana, serving the Missoula, Montana, area and owned by Missoula Broadcasting Company, LLC. KKVU airs an adult top 40 music format.
