= Lolo, Montana =

- Census-designated place
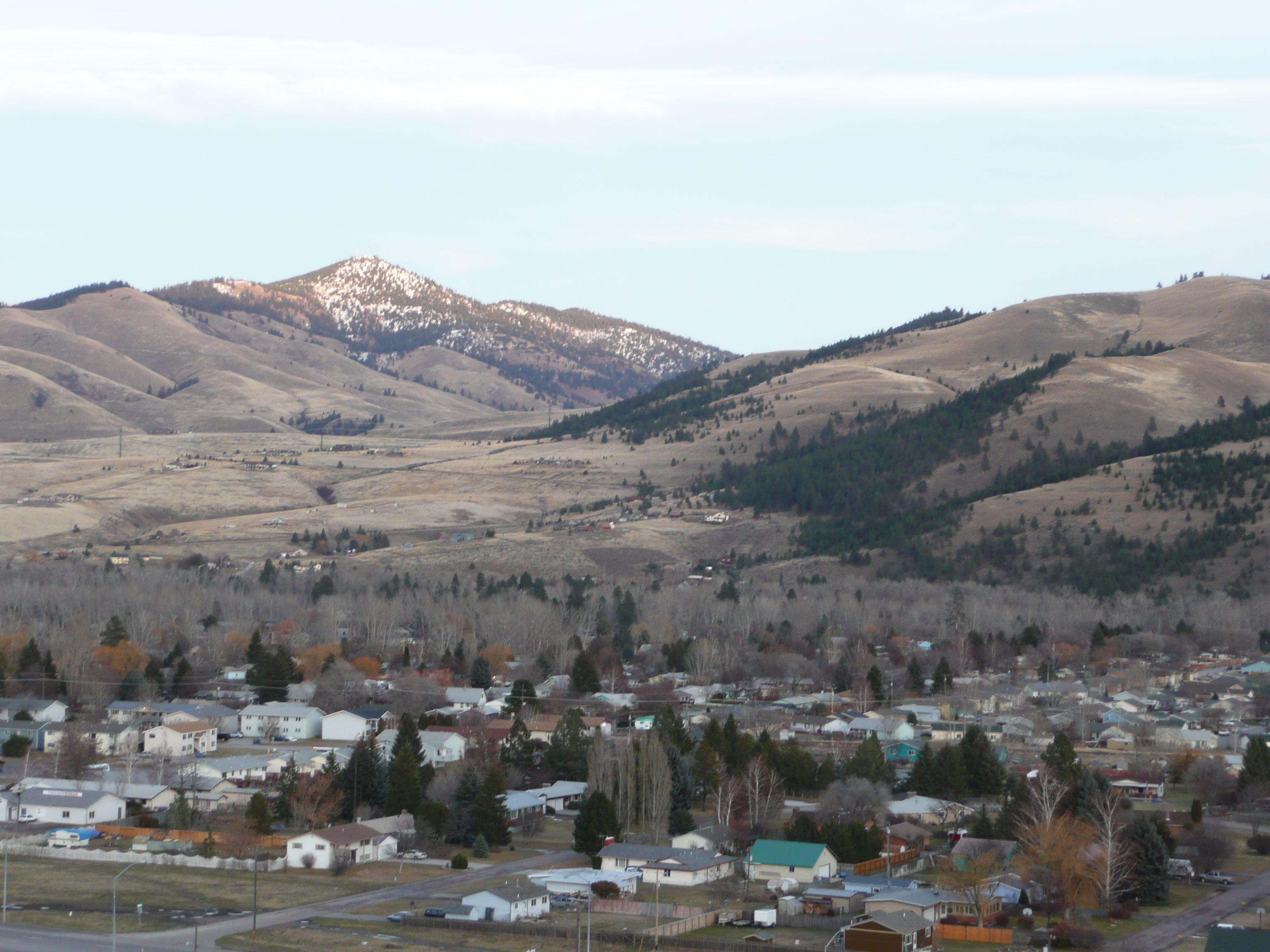
- Nickname: (Salish: čkʷlkʷqin)
- Location in Missoula County and the state of Montana. Grey shading indicates city of Missoula.
- Coordinates: 46°45′55″N 114°06′10″W
- Country: United States
- State: Montana
- County: Missoula

Area
  - Total: 9.63 sq mi (24.95 km^{2})
  - Land: 9.46 sq mi (24.50 km^{2})
  - Water: 0.17 sq mi (0.45 km^{2})
- Elevation: 3,576 ft (1,090 m)

Population (2020)
  - Total: 4,399
  - Density: 465.0/sq mi (179.52/km^{2})
- Time zone: UTC-7 (Mountain (MST))
  - Summer (DST): UTC-6 (MDT)
- ZIP code: 59847
- Area code: 406
- FIPS code: 30-44650
- GNIS feature ID: 2408118

Lolo is an unincorporated community and census-designated place (CDP) in Missoula County, Montana, United States. It is part of the Missoula metropolitan area. The population was 4,399 at the 2020 census, an increase from its population of 3,892 in 2010. It is home to Travelers' Rest State Park, a site where Lewis and Clark camped in 1805 and again in 1806.

== History ==
The Traveler's Rest site, in Lolo, is one of the few sites in the nation with physical confirmation of the visit of Lewis and Clark.

There are several versions of the origin of the town name. One is a French pronunciation of the name Lawrence Rence, a fur trapper in the area. Another is the French name for Meriwether Lewis, "Le Louis". Or it could be based on either a Chinook word or a Nez Perce word. In addition to the town, a national forest, creek, mountain peak, mountain pass, hot springs, and historic trail are all named Lolo.

The 2017 Lolo Peak Fire burned thousands of acres 10 miles (16 km) southwest of Lolo, prompting evacuations and closure of U.S. Route 12.

== Geography ==
Lolo is in south-central Missoula County, at the confluence of Lolo Creek and the Bitterroot River, a north-flowing tributary of the Clark Fork. The Bitterroot Mountains are to the west. The town is at the eastern end of the Lolo Trail, present-day U.S. Route 12, which crosses Lolo Pass at the Idaho state line 33 miles (53 km) west of town. U.S. Route 93 also passes through the community. Missoula is 10 miles (16 km) to the northeast via US 12, while Hamilton is 37 miles (60 km) to the south via US 93.

According to the U.S. Census Bureau, the Lolo CDP has a total area of 9.63 square miles (24.9 km^{2}), of which 9.46 square miles (24.5 km^{2}) are land and 0.17 square miles (0.44 km^{2}), or 1.79%, are water.

=== Climate ===
This climatic region is typified by large seasonal temperature differences, with warm to hot (and often humid) summers and cold (sometimes severely cold) winters. According to the Köppen Climate Classification system, Lolo has a humid continental climate, abbreviated "Dfb" on climate maps.

Climate data for Lolo, Montana
Month	Jan	Feb	Mar	Apr	May	Jun	Jul	Aug	Sep	Oct	Nov	Dec	Year
Mean daily maximum °C (°F)	0 (32)	4 (39)	9 (48)	16 (60)	21 (69)	26 (78)	30 (86)	29 (85)	23 (73)	17 (62)	7 (44)	2 (35)	15 (59)
Mean daily minimum °C (°F)	−14 (6)	−12 (11)	−6 (21)	−1 (31)	5 (41)	9 (49)	12 (53)	11 (51)	5 (41)	−1 (30)	−8 (18)	−13 (9)	−1 (30)
Average precipitation mm (inches)	15 (0.6)	10 (0.4)	20 (0.8)	28 (1.1)	53 (2.1)	58 (2.3)	36 (1.4)	38 (1.5)	30 (1.2)	18 (0.7)	13 (0.5)	13 (0.5)	330 (13.1)
Source: Weatherbase

== Demographics ==
Historical population
Census	Pop.	Note	%±
1980	2,418		—
1990	2,746		13.6%
2000	3,388		23.4%
2010	3,892		14.9%
2020	4,399		13.0%
U.S. Decennial Census

=== 2020 census ===
As of the 2020 census, Lolo had a population of 4,399. The median age was 37.3 years. 25.3% of residents were under the age of 18 and 14.5% of residents were 65 years of age or older. For every 100 females there were 101.0 males, and for every 100 females age 18 and over there were 101.5 males age 18 and over.

0.0% of residents lived in urban areas, while 100.0% lived in rural areas.

There were 1,709 households in Lolo, of which 34.2% had children under the age of 18 living in them. Of all households, 57.1% were married-couple households, 15.7% were households with a male householder and no spouse or partner present, and 20.3% were households with a female householder and no spouse or partner present. About 20.6% of all households were made up of individuals and 10.1% had someone living alone who was 65 years of age or older.

There were 1,806 housing units, of which 5.4% were vacant. The homeowner vacancy rate was 0.8% and the rental vacancy rate was 12.4%.

Racial composition as of the 2020 census
Race	Number	Percent
White	3,987	90.6%
Black or African American	9	0.2%
American Indian and Alaska Native	81	1.8%
Asian	24	0.5%
Native Hawaiian and Other Pacific Islander	2	0.0%
Some other race	28	0.6%
Two or more races	268	6.1%
Hispanic or Latino (of any race)	149	3.4%

=== 2010 census ===
As of the census of 2010, there were 3,892 people, 1,218 households, and 936 families residing in the CDP. The population density was 356.2 inhabitants per square mile (137.5/km^{2}). There were 1,263 housing units at an average density of 132.8 per square mile (51.3/km^{2}). The racial makeup of the CDP was 96.69% White, 0.24% African American, 0.89% Native American, 0.24% Asian, 0.21% from other races, and 1.74% from two or more races. Hispanic or Latino of any race were 1.03% of the population.

There were 1,218 households, out of which 44.0% had children under the age of 18 living with them, 61.6% were married couples living together, 10.3% had a female householder with no husband present, and 23.1% were non-families. 17.3% of all households were made up of individuals, and 4.5% had someone living alone who was 65 years of age or older. The average household size was 2.78 and the average family size was 3.15.

In the CDP, the population was spread out, with 31.3% under the age of 18, 8.2% from 18 to 24, 32.9% from 25 to 44, 20.8% from 45 to 64, and 6.8% who were 65 years of age or older. The median age was 32 years. For every 100 females, there were 100.2 males. For every 100 females age 18 and over, there were 96.5 males.

The median income for a household in the CDP was $43,846, and the median income for a family was $46,629. Males had a median income of $30,392 versus $22,188 for females. The per capita income for the CDP was $18,369. About 2.5% of families and 4.7% of the population were below the poverty line, including 5.8% of those under age 18 and 4.2% of those age 65 or over.

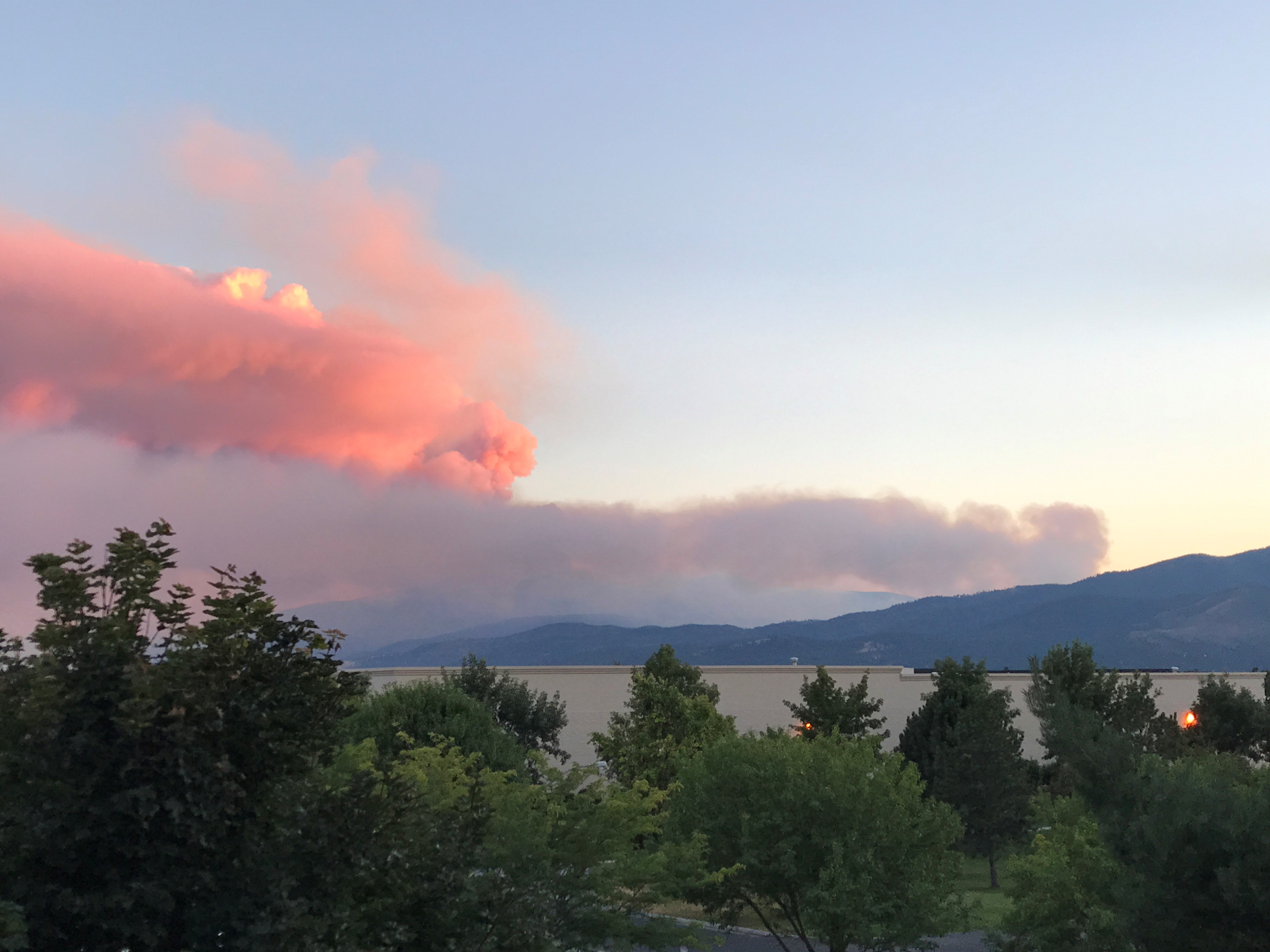
Lolo Fire smoke plume from Missoula, August 16, 2017

== Education ==
Most of Lolo is in Lolo Elementary School District while the a small portion is in Missoula Elementary School District and another small portion is in Woodman Elementary School District. All of it is in Missoula High School District.

The Lolo School District has two schools, Lolo Elementary (K-4) and Lolo Middle School (5–8). During the 2021–2022 school year, a total of 538 students were enrolled.

Students attend high school in Missoula.

The Missoula Public Library has a branch location in Lolo.

== Media ==
The FM radio station KDXT is licensed in Lolo. It airs a country music format.

== Infrastructure ==
The town lies at the intersection of U.S. Routes 12 and 93.

Healthcare is provided in Missoula.

== Notable people ==
- William M. Allen, aerospace industrialist; born in Lolo
- James Lee Burke, mystery writer; maintains a home in Lolo
- David James Duncan, writer and fisherman
- Tom Zeller Jr., journalist and author; lives in Lolo

== See also ==
- List of census-designated places in Montana
- Woodman School (1892)
