= KMSO =

Radio station in Missoula, Montana

- Missoula, Montana; United States
- Broadcast area: Missoula, Montana
- Frequency: 102.5 MHz
- Branding: 102.5 Mountain FM

Programming
- Format: Hot adult contemporary

Ownership
- Owner: Mountain Broadcasting; (Sheila Callahan & Friends, Inc.)
- Sister stations: KHDV

History
- First air date: February 6, 1985 (as KUEZ)
- Former call signs: KUEZ (1985–1987)

Technical information
- Licensing authority: FCC
- Facility ID: 60052
- Class: C1
- ERP: 22,000 watts
- HAAT: 534 meters
- Transmitter coordinates: 46°48′31.4″N 113°58′41.6″W

Links
- Public license information: Public file; LMS
- Website: www.mountain1025.com

KMSO (102.5 FM) is a commercial radio station in Missoula, Montana. The station airs a Hot AC music format featuring Hot Hits. KMSO was locally owned, by Sheila Callahan & Friends, Incorporated, and serves Western Montana.

== History ==
KUEZ began broadcasting in 1985. The station became KMSO when the call letters became available, as MSO is the airport code for Missoula. The station started out playing easy listening music. In the 90s it became The Point playing a mix between hot adult contemporary and adult alternative. In the 2000s, it would become Mountain FM.

KMSO signed off the air on New Year's Eve 2024, as owner Sheila Callahan retired from radio broadcasting. Sister station KHDV, repeated on K279CP in Missoula, also signed off.

On December 9th, 2025, after a sale to Sticks Media, KMSO returned to the air, stunting with Gregorian chants as "102.5 Monk FM". KMSO is expected to return to its previous Hot AC "Mountain FM" format after the stunt. As of December 10th, at 8AM, the Hot AC format and the "Mountain FM" branding returned.
