= KUFM (FM) =

Radio station in Missoula, Montana

- Missoula, Montana; United States
- Frequency: 89.1 MHz
- Branding: Montana Public Radio

Programming
- Format: Public radio
- Affiliations: Montana Public Radio; National Public Radio; American Public Media; Public Radio Exchange

Ownership
- Owner: University of Montana; (University of Montana)

History
- First air date: January 31, 1965

Technical information
- Licensing authority: FCC
- Facility ID: 69239
- Class: C
- ERP: 14,500 watts
- HAAT: 754 meters (2,474 ft)
- Transmitter coordinates: 47.0327°N 113.9923°W
- Translator: See § Translators

Links
- Public license information: Public file; LMS
- Webcast: Listen live
- Website: www.mtpr.org

KUFM (89.1 FM) is a radio station licensed to Missoula, Montana. The station is owned by the University of Montana, and serves as the flagship station of Montana Public Radio.

== History ==
Montana Public Radio began on January 31, 1965, when KUFM signed on as a 10-watt campus radio station. In 1974, it became a charter member of National Public Radio. It also has a children's corner.

Starting in the late 1970s, KUFM began building translators across western Montana. Its first full-power satellite, in Great Falls, signed on in 1984. In 1999, a signal extension project funded mostly by a federal grant made it possible to sign on new stations in Kalispell and Hamilton and upgrade translators in Butte and Helena to full-power stations.

== Translators ==
KUFM also utilizes three translators.

Broadcast translator for KUFM
Call sign	Frequency	City of license	FID	ERP (W)	Class	FCC info
K267BJ	101.3 FM	Ferndale, Etc., Montana	64280	48	D	LMS
K218AI	91.5 FM	Rattlesnake Valley, Montana	68954	250	D	LMS
K219BN	91.7 FM	Whitefish, Montana	69227	21	D	LMS
