= List of buildings and structures in Missoula, Montana =

Since Missoula, Montana's founding in 1866 it has progressed from small trading post with a single cross street on Mullan Road and a bridge across the Clark Fork River to a vibrant college town home to the University of Montana. Architectural styles have come and gone, and today Missoula is home to over 60 buildings on the National Register of Historic Places beginning with the A.J. Gibson designed County Courthouse constructed in 1908 and added to the list in 1976 with the Post Office, Wilma Theatre and Higgin's Block all added a couple years later.

== Historical buildings and districts ==
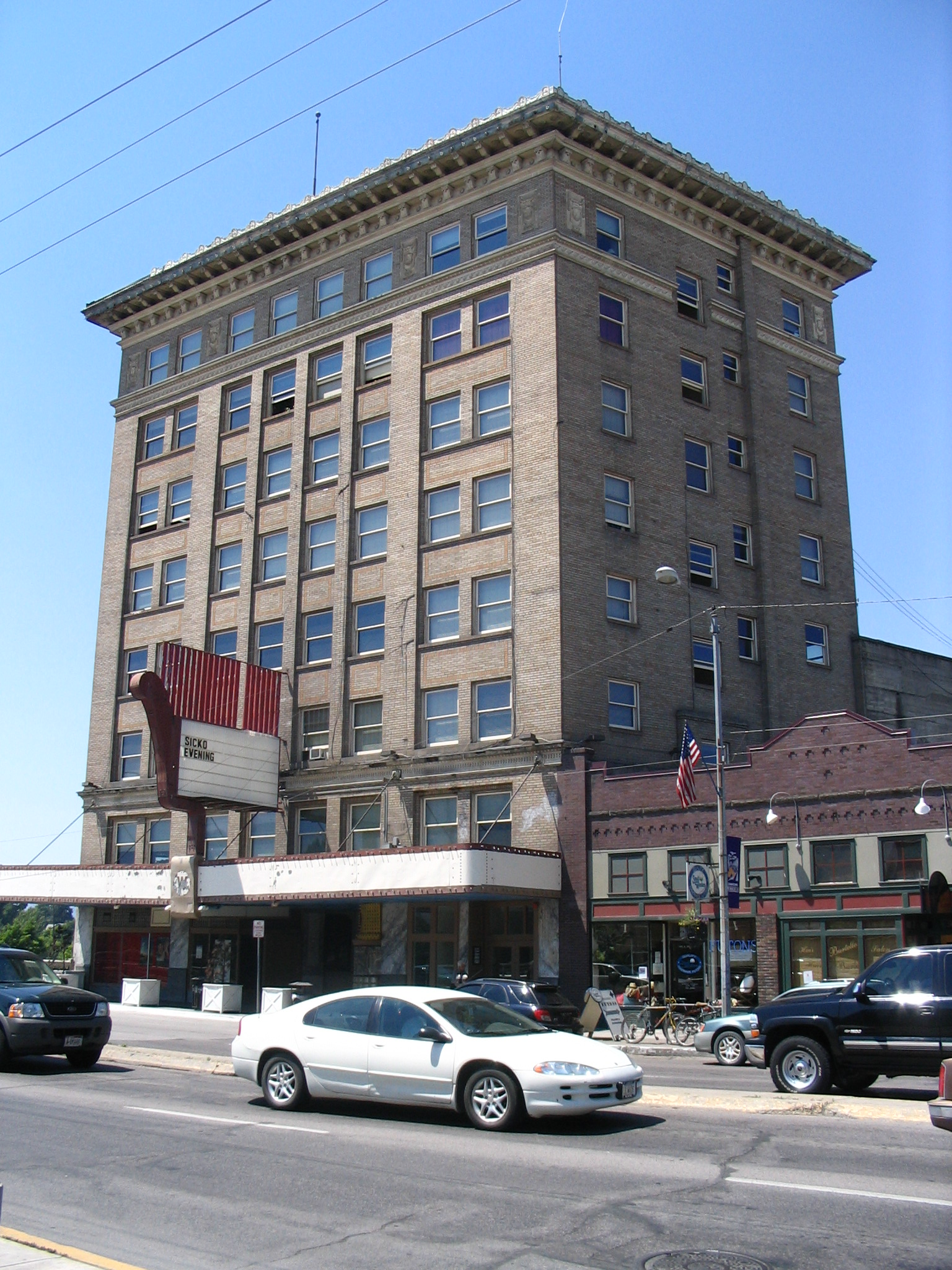
Wilma Theatre

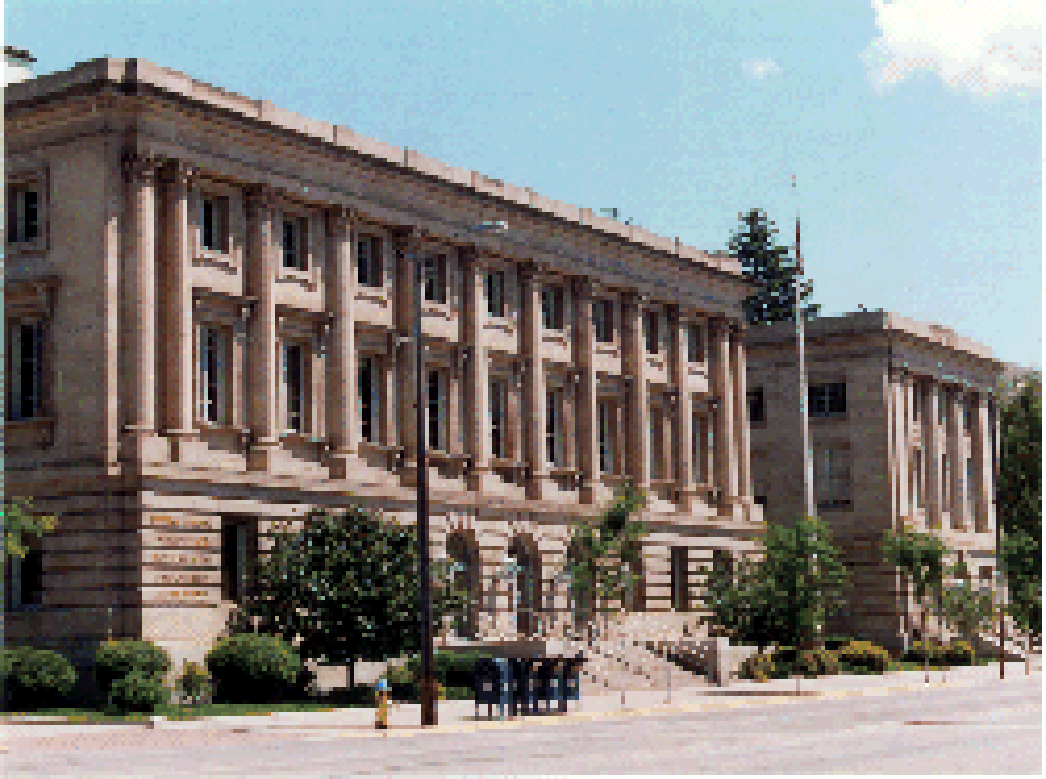
Missoula Post Office

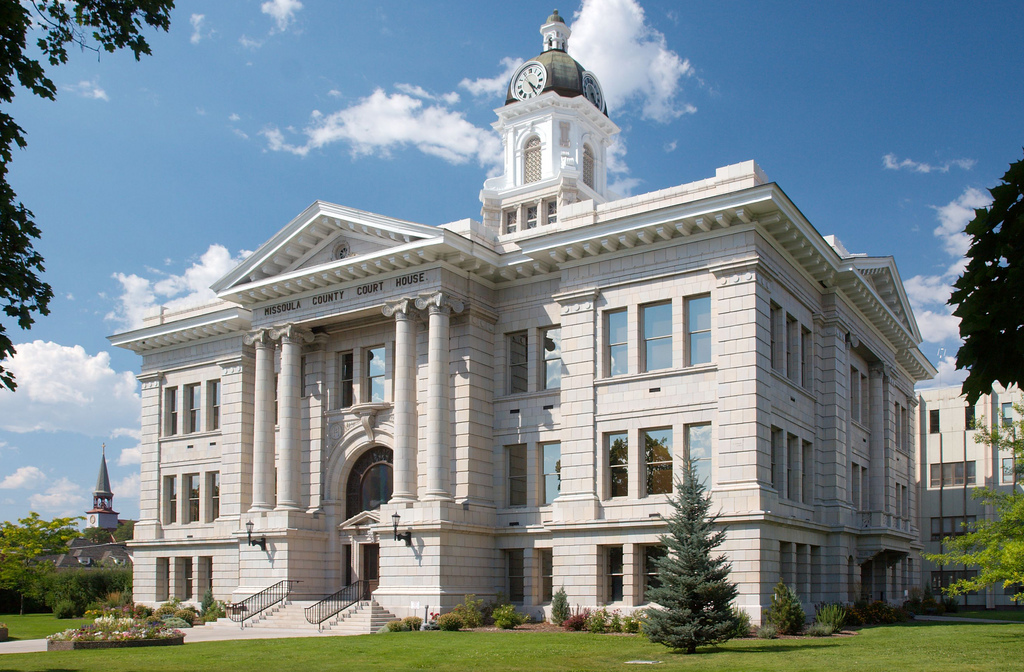
Missoula County Courthouse

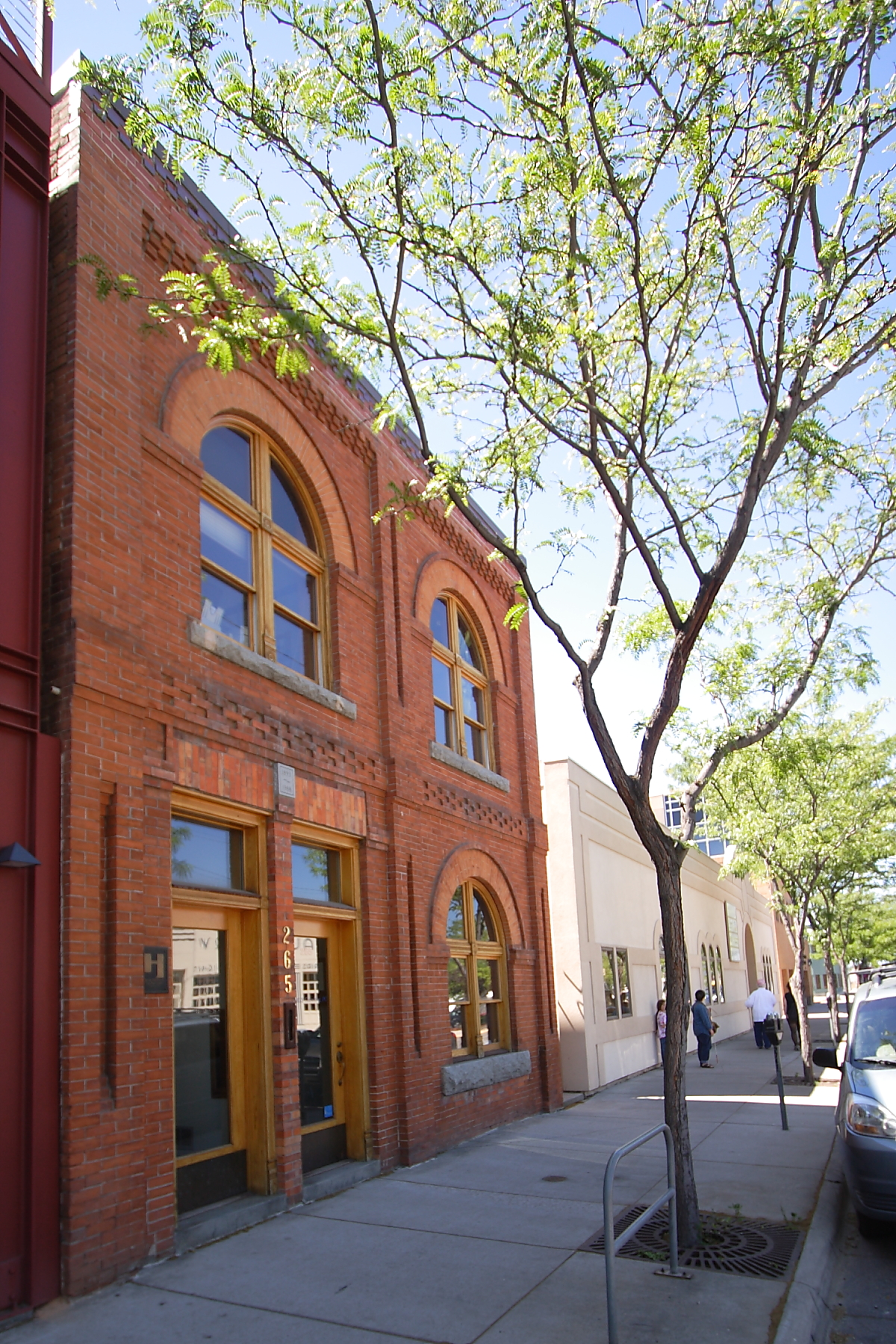
The Gleim Building

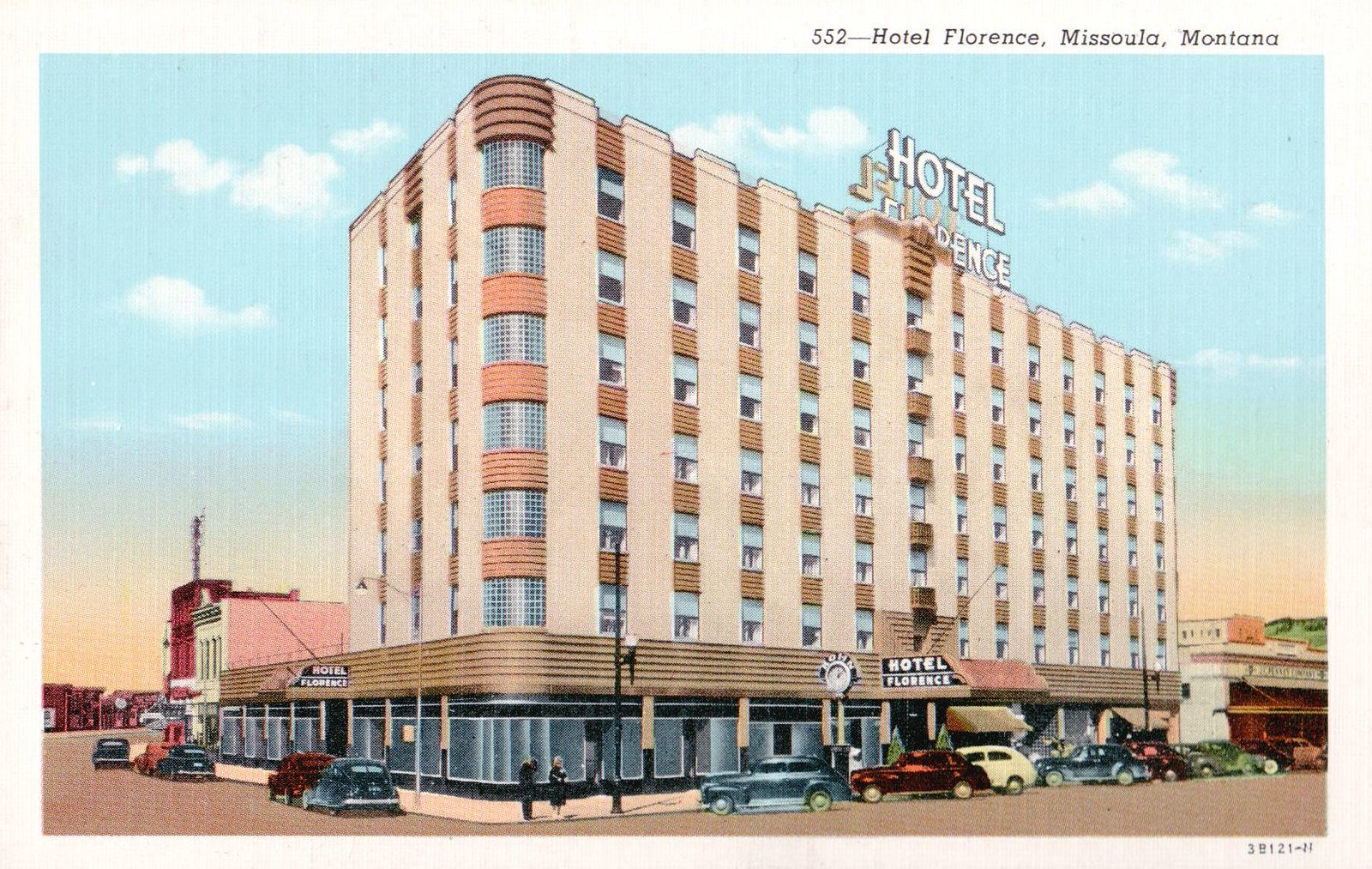
Florence Hotel

National Register of Historic Places Building Listings in Missoula
Property name	Address	Built	Listing date
Apartment Building at 116 Spruce Street	116 W Spruce St	1902	April 30, 1990
Atlantic Hotel	519 N Higgins Ave	1902	April 30, 1990
Bellows House	1637 S Higgins Ave	1909	February 22, 1996
Belmont Hotel	430 N Higgins Ave	1913	April 20, 1983
Bluebird Building	220-224 N Higgins Ave		August 8, 1996
Brunswick Hotel	223 Railroad St	1890	April 30, 1990
Carnegie Public Library	335 N Pattee St	1903	April 30, 1982
Christie, Thomas J., House	401 McLeod Ave	1912	March 16, 1995
Cook Farm	5185 Old Marshall Grade Rd		May 16, 1996
Florence Hotel	111 N Higgins Ave	1941	June 18, 1992
Flynn Farm	W of Missoula on Mullan Rd	1884	March 19, 1980
Forkenbrock Funeral Home	234 E Pine St	1929	December 27, 1984
Garden City Drug	118 N Higgins Ave	1902	April 30, 1990
Gibson, A. J., House	402 S 2nd St.	1889	April 16, 1980
Gleim Building	265 W Front St	1893	April 30, 1990
Gleim Building II	255-257 W Front St	1893	March 9, 1995
Grand Pacific Hotel	118 W Alder	1902	September 29, 1983
Hammond Arcade	101 S Higgins Ave	1934	April 30, 1990
Headquarters Building and Daily Company Annex	113-119 W Front St	1888	May 17, 1996
Hellgate Lodge 383 BPOE	120 N Pattee St	1911	April 30, 1990
Herzog, J. M., House	1210 Toole Ave	1892	September 12, 1985
Higgins Block	202 N Higgins Ave	1889	October 1, 1979
Independent Telephone Company Building	207 E Main St	1911	April 30, 1990
Johnston, John S., House	412 W Alder St	1900	August 2, 1984
Kiem, Levi Building	314 N 1ST W	1890	May 4, 1995
Keith, John M., House	1110 Gerald Ave	1910	July 7, 1983
Knowles Building	200-210 S Third St W	1905	April 9, 1987
Labor Temple	208 E Main St	1916	April 30, 1990
Lenox Flats	300-306 West Broadway	1905	August 8, 2000
Lucy Building	330 N Higgins Ave	1909	April 30, 1990
Marsh and Powell Funeral Home	224 W Spruce St	1930	April 30, 1990
Masonic Lodge	120-136 E Broadway Ave	1909	April 30, 1990
Merrick, Rose Building	837/827 Woody ST	1890/1906	May 4, 1995
McCaffery Furnished Rooms	501 W Alder	1910	April 6, 2000
Milwaukee Depot	250 Station Dr	1910	April 30, 1982
Missoula County Courthouse	220 W Broadway	1910	September 1, 1976
Missoula Laundry Company	111 E. Spruce St	1915	April 30, 1990
Missoula Mercantile	114 N Higgins Ave	1882	April 30, 1990
Missoula Mercantile Warehouse	221 229 and 231 E Front St	1902	April 6, 2004
Model Laundry and Apartments	131 W Alder St	1915	April 30, 1990
Montgomery Ward	201 N Higgins Ave	1935	April 30, 1990
Moon-Randolph Ranch	1515 Spurlock Rd	1889	March 1, 2010
Northern Pacific Railroad Depot	Railroad and Higgins Ave	1901	March 28, 1985
Palace Hotel	147 W Broadway	1909	October 25, 1982
Paxson, Edgar, House	611 Stephens Ave	1890	November 6, 1986
Potomac School	220 Potomac Rd	1913	March 30, 1992
Prescott, Clarence R., House	University of Montana	1898	September 26, 1985
Reid House	526 E Front		December 18, 2003
St Francis Xavier Church	420 W Pine St	1891	April 28, 1982
Simons Block	314 N Higgins Avenue	1899	February 18, 2000
Sterling, Fred T., House	1310 Gerald Ave	1912	July 7, 1983
Studebaker Building	216 W Main St	1921	April 17, 1997
Toole, John R., House	1005 Gerald Ave		April 25, 1983
US Post Office	200 E Broadway St	1911	November 30, 1979
University Apartments	400-422 Roosevelt Ave	1909	March 28, 1985
Wilma Theatre	104 S Higgins Ave	1921	December 31, 1997
Zip Auto	251 W Main St	1937	April 30, 1990

National Register of Historic Places Districts Listings in Missoula
Property name	Address	Listing date
Duncan Block	232-240 N Higgins Ave	October 17, 1997
Fort Missoula Historic District	Reserve St and South Ave	April 29, 1987
Lower Rattlesnake Historic District	roughly bounded by Vene St., Greenough Park, Elm St. and Pierce St.	June 10, 1999
Lolo Trail	from near Lolo Montana to Weippe Prairie Idaho	October 9, 1960
McCormick Neighborhood Historic District	Roughly bounded by River Rd, S. 6th W., S. Orange St. and Bitterroot Line of the railroad	May 19, 2004
Missoula County Fairgrounds Historic District	1101 S Ave W	September 16, 2010
Missoula Downtown Historic District	Roughly bounded by Northern Pacific RR, Clak Fork R, Little McCormick Park and Madison St.	August 21, 2009
Missoula East Pine Street Historic District	Roughly bounded by E. Pine St., Madison St., E. Broadway and Pattee St	July 13, 1989
Missoula Northside Railroad Historic District	Roughly bounded by Worden Ave., 6th St., I-90, C. St., and the Northern Pacific RR tracks	May 4, 1995
Missoula Southside Historic District	Roughly bounded by the Clark Fork River and S. Higgins Ave., S. 6th St. W. and Orange St	March 22, 1991
University Area Historic District	Roughly bounded by S. 4th East St., Beckwith Ave., Arthur Ave., and Higgins Ave.	December 13, 2000
University of Montana Historic District	Roughly bounded by Arthur, Connell, and Beckwith Aves and the ridge lines of Mt Sentinel	October 2, 1992

== Sports venues ==
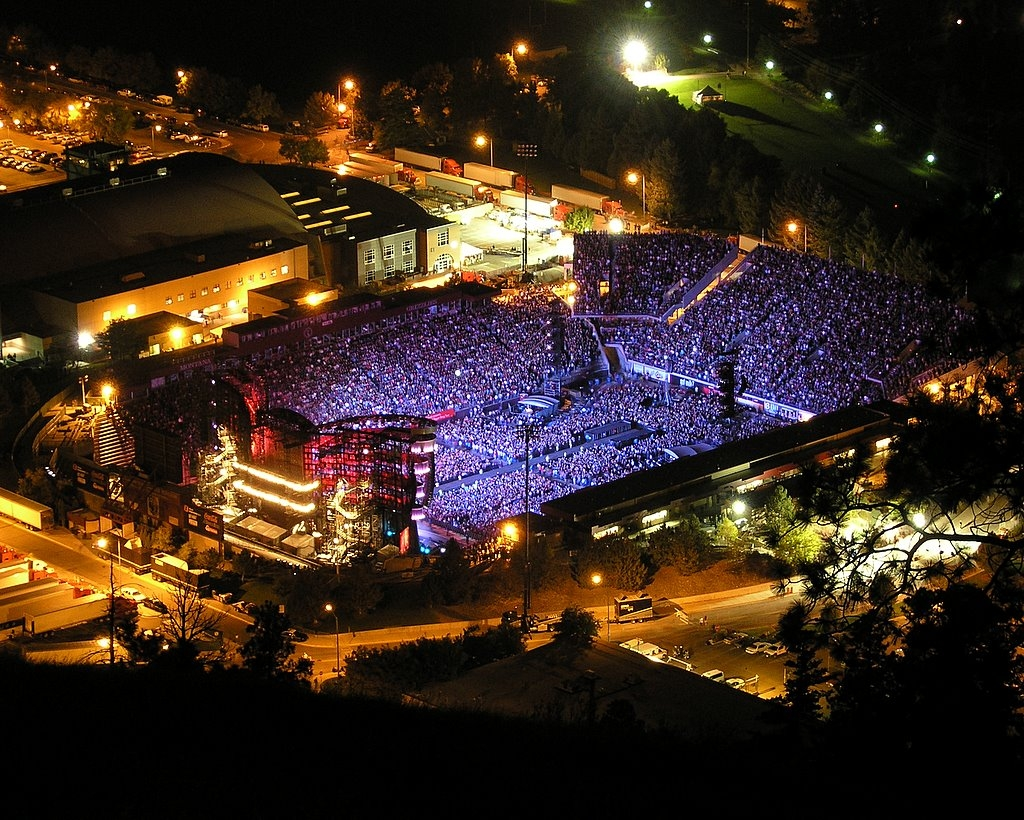
Washington-Grizzly Stadium

- Washington–Grizzly Stadium
- Ogren Park at Allegiance Field
- Glacier Ice Rink
- Dornblaser Field
- Dahlberg Arena
- Cook Court

== Tallest buildings in Missoula ==
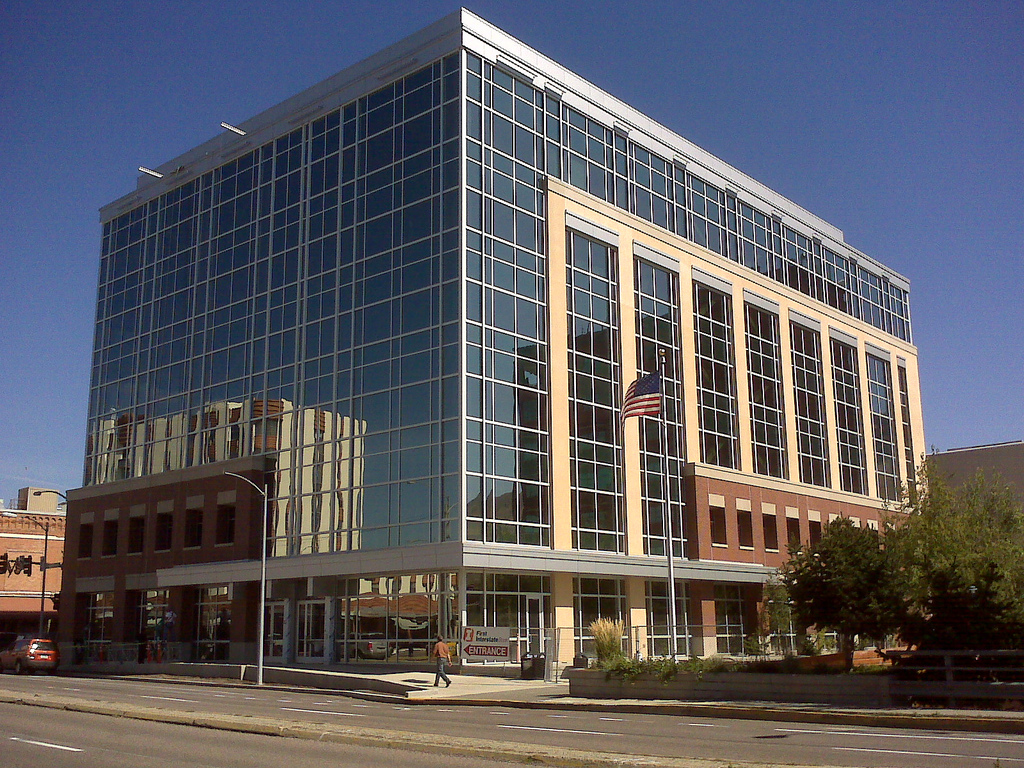
The First Interstate Center, Missoula's 8th tallest Building

Place	Address	Floors/height(if applicable)	Year(s) built	Primary use
Aber hall	32 Campus Dr	11 floors/138 feet	1968	dormitory
Jesse Hall	114 Jesse Hall	11 floors/138 feet	1969	dormitory
Millennium Building	125 Bank St	9 floors/128 feet	(1996–1998)	office
Clark Fork Riverside	301 W. Front St	9 floors/113 feet	1979	residential
Wilma Building (historic)	131 S. Higgins Ave	9 floors/103 feet	1921	theatre/residential
Broadway Building (Missoula)	500 W. Broadway St	7 floors/87.95 feet	2002	hospital
The Florence Building (Downtown Missoula)	111 N. Higgins Ave	7 floors/87 feet	1941	office
Stockman Bank Building	321 W. Broadway St	6 floors/85 feet	2017	office
First Interstate Center (Missoula)	101 E. Front St	6 floors/80 feet	(2008–2009)	office
Data and Trade Building	100 E. Broadway St	6 floors/80 feet	1998	office
AC Hotel (Downtown Missoula)	175 N. Pattee St	6 floors/75 feet	2021	hotel
Hilton Garden Inn	3720 N. Reserve St	6 floors/75 feet	(2006–2007)	hotel
Garlington Building (Missoula, Montana)	350 Ryman St	6 floors/75 feet	2009-2010	office/commercial

== Buildings under construction ==
proposed name	Floor(s)	completion year	city
Missoula College	4	2016	Missoula
Stockman Bank Building	6 (85 feet)	2017	Missoula
