= History of Missoula, Montana =

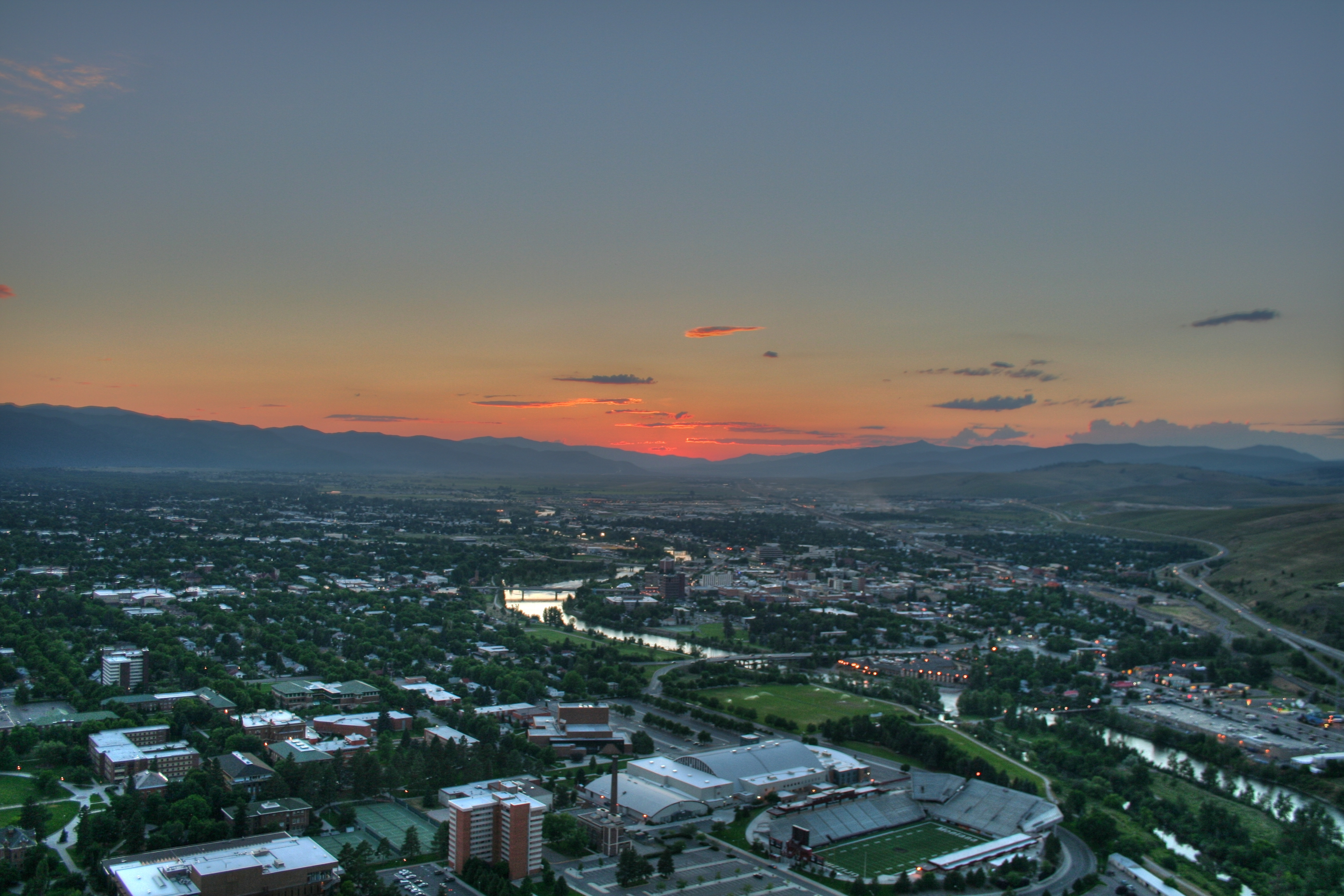
View of Missoula, Montana, looking west from Mount Sentinel over the University of Montana toward Downtown Missoula

The history of Missoula, Montana begins as early as 12,000 years ago with the end of the region's glacial lake period with western exploration dating back to the Lewis and Clark Expedition of 1804–1806. The first permanent settlement was founded in 1860.

== Earliest Missoula ==
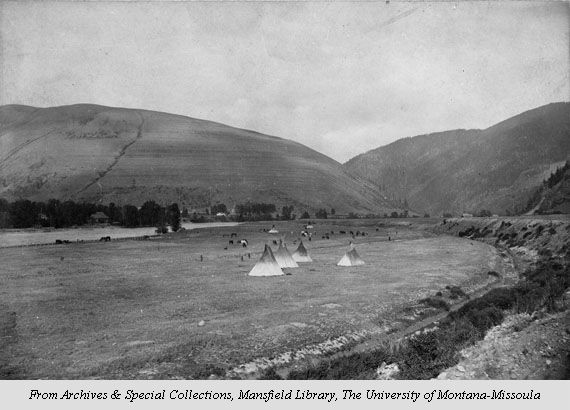
Teepees set up in modern-day Missoula south of the Clark Fork River, facing east

Today's Missoula lies at the bottom of what once was Glacial Lake Missoula, a 3,000-square-mile (7,800 km^{2}) proglacial lake which stretched from 60 miles (97 km) south and east of Missoula north to today's Flathead Lake and west to Idaho's Lake Pend Oreille. Held in place by a glacial dam, this lake drained and refilled repeatedly over 2,000 years during the past Ice Age. When the flood waters cleared, the resultant Missoula Valley became a geographic hub of five mountain valleys formed by the Bitterroot Mountains, Sapphire Range, Garnet Range, Rattlesnake Mountains, and Reservation Divide.

The oldest artifacts date from the end of the glacial lake period around 12,000 years ago with the first-known settlements dating from 3,500 BC. From the 1700s until European settlement, the region was used by Salish, Kootenai, Pend d'Oreille, Blackfeet, and Shoshone tribes.

As a natural corridor through the mountains, the valley was the scene of great conflict between local First American tribes and those traversing the region to and from Montana's eastern plains, which were rich with buffalo. The narrow valley at Missoula's eastern entrance was so strewn with human bones from repeated ambushes that French fur trappers would later refer to this area as "Porte d' Enfer," translated as "Hell's Gate". Hell Gate would remain the name of the area until it was renamed "Missoula" in 1866.

== Early explorers ==
The first European Americans to visit what would become Missoula were members of the Lewis and Clark Expedition. The expedition stopped twice just south of Missoula at Traveler's Rest; first from September 9–11, 1805, and again from June 30 – July 3, 1806. From here, the Lewis and Clark Expedition split up on the return from the Pacific, with Clark taking the southern route along the Bitterroot River and Lewis travelling north through Hellgate Canyon on July 4.

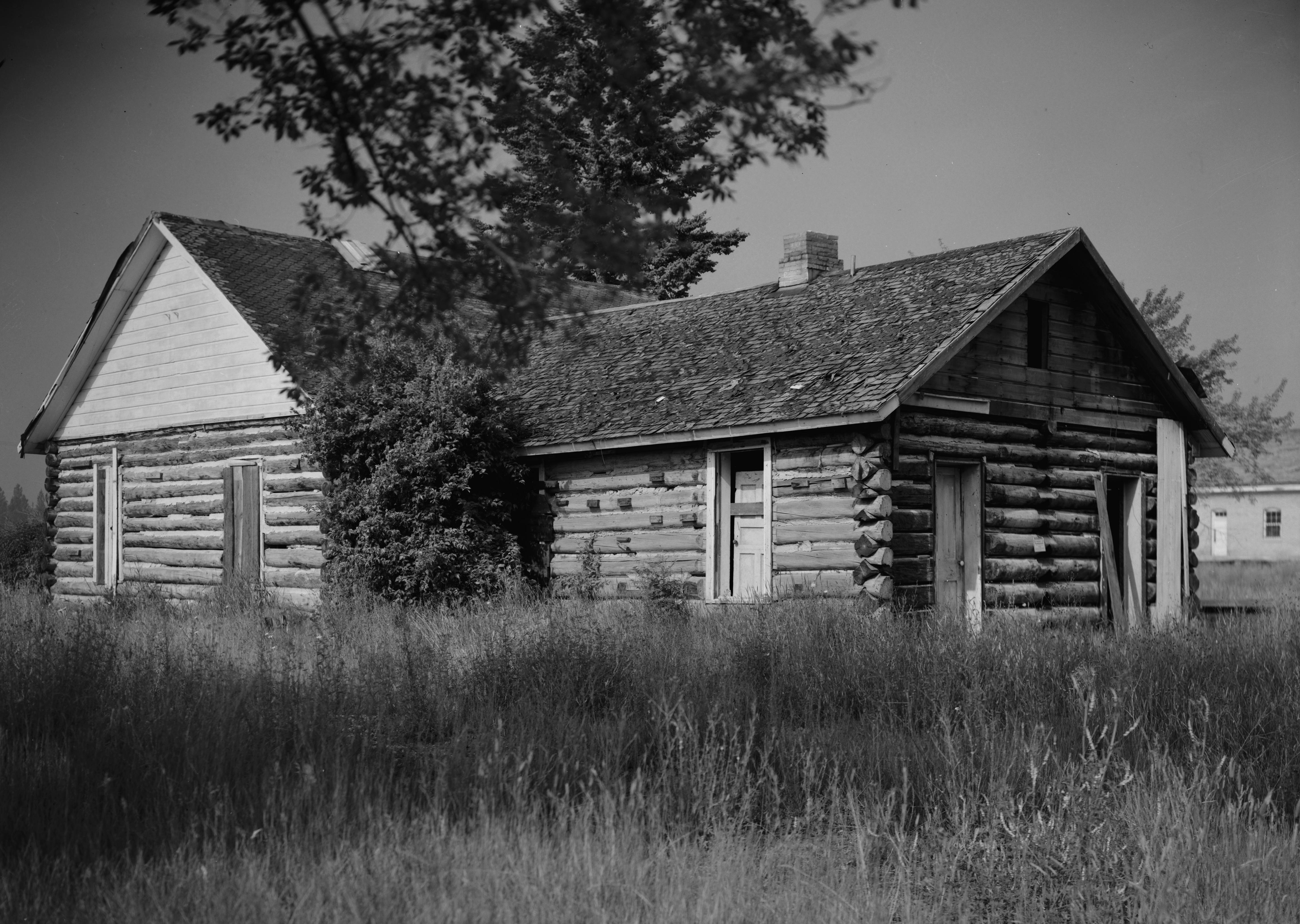
Missoula Barracks

The region was first surveyed by Washington Territory governor Isaac Stevens in the 1850s by Congressional request as a means of developing a transcontinental rail route. Stevens would also negotiate the Treaty of Hellgate through which the Native American tribes of western Montana relinquished their territories to the U.S. government. Stevens was assisted by Lieutenant John Mullan who would build the Mullan Road in 1853. The wagon road was the first to cross the Rocky Mountains to the inland of the Pacific Northwest, and would enable the establishment of Fort Missoula in 1877.

== Hell Gate Village ==
Settlement in Missoula began five miles (8 km) to the west near modern Frenchtown in 1860 as a trading post founded by Christopher P. Higgins, who had been present at the Treaty of Hellgate, and business partner Francis L. Worden, with the expectation that the Mullan Road and any future railroad would necessarily pass through the valley. Their gamble was correct and Hell Gate became the Missoula County seat in 1860; the first post office was established on November 25, 1862, with Worden as the first postmaster. The settlement moved upstream to its modern location in 1864 as Higgins and Worden's desire to build a lumber and flour mill required a more convenient water supply to power the gristmill.

The Missoula Mills replaced Hell Gate Village as the economic power of the valley and replaced it as the county seat in 1866. The name "Missoula" comes from the Salish name for the Clark Fork River, which runs through the city. The name ‘’nmesuletkʷ", though often mistakenly believed to translate as "River of Ambush" as a reflection of the intertribal fighting common to the area, actually has the approximate meaning of "place of freezing/cold liquid", or more roughly "cold water" (cf. Interior Salishan locative marker n-, Southern Interior Salishan sul, 'cold/frozen', and -etkʷ, 'liquid'). This name is thought by some Salish tribal members to refer to Glacial Lake Missoula.

== City ==
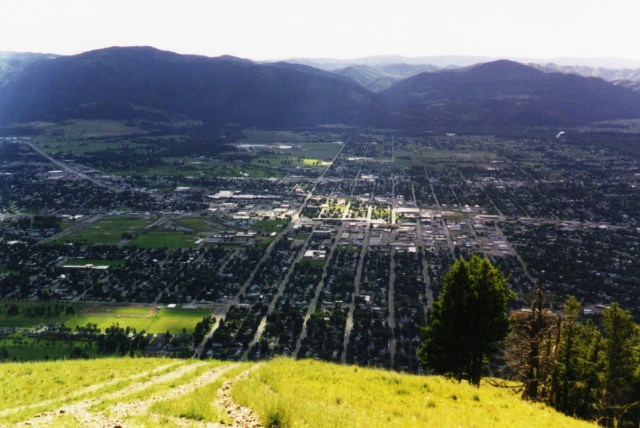
Looking west toward the Bitterroot Mountains over Missoula from Mount Sentinel

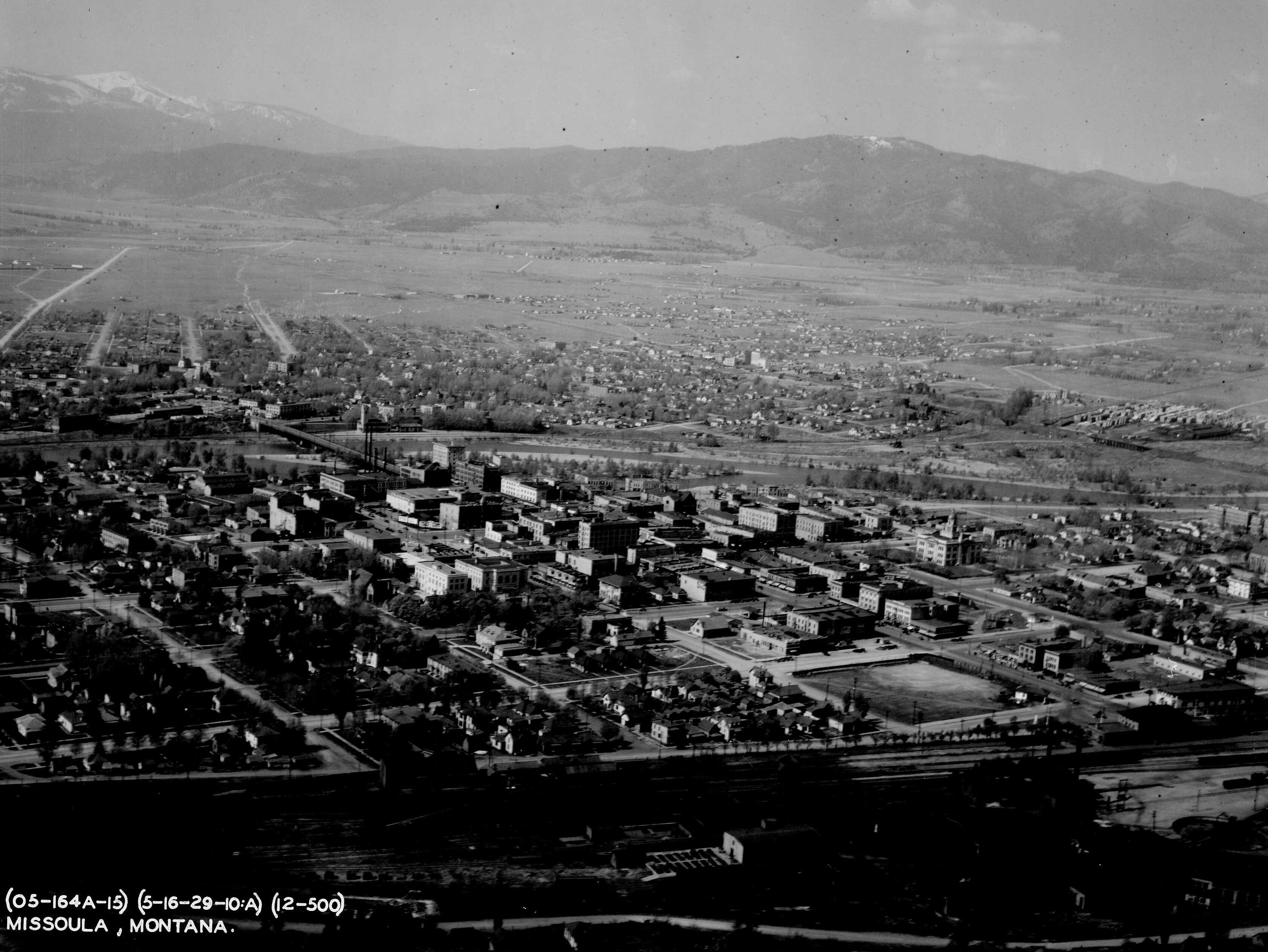
Aerial view of Missoula, 1931

Missoula never "boomed" as many western Montana towns did as a consequence of the gold rush, though the town did grow rapidly, and by 1872 the town had 66 new buildings. Higgins and Worden established the town's first stores and banks, but by 1876 the pair faced its largest competition and rivalry from Eddy, Hammond and company, who established the Missoula Mercantile Company.

By the 1880s growth had slowed, but the arrival of the Northern Pacific Railway in 1883 caused growth to accelerate again and Territorial Governor Benjamin F. Potts approved a charter for the Town of Missoula. The need for lumber for the railway and its bridges spurred the opening of multiple saw mills in the area and, in turn, the beginning of Missoula's lumber industry. The economic frenzy led to the construction of many of the historic buildings in downtown today. In particular, architect A. J. Gibson arrived in the late 1880s and designed many of Missoula's most recognizable buildings, including the Missoula County Courthouse and the University of Montana's Main Hall.

== Establishment of the University of Montana ==
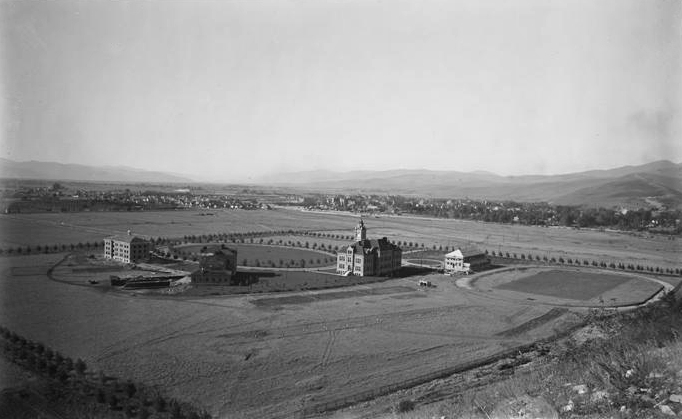
University of Montana campus around 1900

In an agreement with Helena that Missoula would not enter a bid to become the new state of Montana's capital and not openly support nearer by Anaconda, Missoula was able to win the vote to be the home of the state's university in 1893, making UM the oldest institution of higher education in Montana. Land south of the Clark Fork River (Downtown had established itself north of the river) was donated for the construction of the campus.

== 20th century ==
The continued economic windfall from railroad construction and lumber mills led to a further boom in Missoula's population. A.B. Hammond and Copper Kings Marcus Daly and William A. Clark competed fiercely in the region over lumber share and Missoula investments, and in 1908 Missoula became the district, and later a regional, headquarters for the United States Forest Service, which also began training smokejumpers in 1942. There was a decrease in population from 1910 to 1920, but since 1920 Missoula has seen a steady pace of growth.

In 1909, the Industrial Workers of the World organized their first protests for freedom of speech. Resulting in the town's jails being flooded with IWW members.

In the 1930s, Missoula was able to obtain fourteen Civil Works Administration projects that helped build the airport, Orange Street Bridge, several schools, and four major buildings at the university.

Logging remained a mainstay of industry in Missoula with the groundbreaking of the Hoerner-Waldorf pulp mill in 1956, which led to subsequent protests over the resultant air pollution. In 1979, almost 40% of the county's labor income came from the wood and paper products sector. By the early 1990s, however, many of the region's log yards, along with legislation, had cleaned the skies, though the valley's topography still makes the city susceptible to lingering smoke from forest fires and winter smog.

== Modern era ==
The start of the modern era began when all the logging yards in Missoula, which had once completely driven the city's economy, vanished. Once logging vanished, the Missoula Downtown Association was born and downtown Missoula became what it is today. With the completion of the First Interstate Bank, the First Security Bank, the new St. Patrick Hospital and Health Sciences Center, and the Millennium Building, the second tallest building in Missoula, downtown finally started to have a contemporary feel. In 2010 the Garlington Building completed its construction further increasing the number of contemporary buildings in Missoula.

== Timeline ==
Historical population
Census	Pop.	Note	%±
1870	400		—
1880	347		−13.2%
1890	3,426		887.3%
1900	4,366		27.4%
1910	12,896		195.4%
1920	12,668		−1.8%
1930	14,657		15.7%
1940	18,449		25.9%
1950	22,485		21.9%
1960	27,090		20.5%
1970	29,497		8.9%
1980	33,388		13.2%
1990	42,918		28.5%
2000	57,053		32.9%
2010	66,788		17.1%

=== 1800 ===
- Sept 4, 1805 – Lewis and Clark Expedition reaches Missoula on way to Pacific Ocean.
- July 4, 1806 – Lewis and Clark Expedition passes through Missoula on return trip.
- 1841 – Father DeSmet brings first wheeled vehicle through Missoula Valley on way to establishing St. Mary's Mission.

=== 1850 ===
- 1853–55 – Missoula area surveyed by Washington Territorial governor Isaac Stevens and his assistant John Mullan.
- July 7–9, 1855 – Hellgate treaty negotiated.
- 1860
  - C.P. Higgins, Francis L. Worden, and Frank Woody set up trading post of Hellgate.
  - Dec 14 – Missoula County created by Washington Territorial Legislature with Hellgate as the county seat.
- 1860–1861 – Mullan Road built through Missoula Valley.
- 1864
  - Saw mill and grist mill erected by Worden & Co. 4 miles east of Hellgate.
  - May 28 – Montana Territory organized
- 1865 – Missoula Mills founded.
- Feb 1866 – County seat moved to Missoula Mills.
- 1869
  - Emma Stack Dickenson hired as Missoula's first teacher.
  - First bridge built across the Clark Fork River, then called Hellgate River.
- 1870 – Missoula first newspaper, "The Missoula and Ceder Creek Pioneer" went to press.
- 1871 – Streets surveyed and town plan drawn.
- 1873
  - First Higgins Ave. Bridge constructed.
  - St. Patrick Hospital opened.
- 1875 – First fair organized and held.
- 1877
  - Fort Missoula established.
  - first Fire Department organized.
- 1878 – Library Association formed.
- 1879 – First telephones installed
- 1883
  - Charter for Town of Missoula approved by voters and formed as an aldermanic form of government..
  - June 23 – Northern Pacific Railway arrived.
- 1884 – First telephone exchange opened.
- 1887 – First City Hall constructed
- 1889
  - Electricity arrived to Missoula.
  - Missoula re-incorporated as City of Missoula by popular vote
  - Nov 8 – Montana becomes a state.
- 1890 – First horse-drawn streetcars went into service
- 1892 - St. Francis Xavier Church (Missoula, Montana)
- 1894 – Missoula Public Library opened.
- 1895 – University of Montana opened

=== 1900 ===
- 1908
  - United States Forest Service Office established.
  - Flood washes away Higgins Ave. Bridge
- 1909 - The IWW holds their first free speech fight.
- 1910 – First electric streetcars were introduced.
- 1911
  - Second City Hall opened. City adopts a commission-council form of government.
  - City's first aviation event with Eugene Ely taking off in a Curtiss biplane near Fort Missoula.
- 1913 – First plane flies into Missoula (from Milltown).
- 1917 – Jeannette Rankin sworn in as first women elected to U.S. Congress.
- 1920 – First public swimming pool opened.
- 1932 – Streetcars replaced by buses.
- 1940 – Italian sailors interned at Fort Missoula
- 1941 – Japanese Americans interned at Fort Missoula
- 1947 – Juliet Gregory elected city's first woman mayor.

=== 1950 ===
- 1954
  - Aerial Fire Depot dedicated by President Eisenhower.
  - The City's form of government changed to commission-manager.
- 1959 – The City returned to an aldermanic form of government.
- 1961 – Erection of sewage treatment plan approved.
- 1965–66 – Interstate 90 built through Missoula.
- 1969 – Current City Hall completed
- 1970 – Mayor Richard G. Shoup resigns to become U.S. Congressmen.
- 1979 – Last passenger train left Missoula.
- 1995
  - May – A Carousel for Missoula opens.
  - Nov – First Open Space Bond approved.

=== 2000 ===
- 2000 – Missoula passes Great Falls to become Montana's second largest city.
- 2002 – Nielsen Media local market estimates rate Missoula as the largest broadcast television market in Montana.
