= The Roxy Theater (Missoula) =

Movie theater in Montana, US

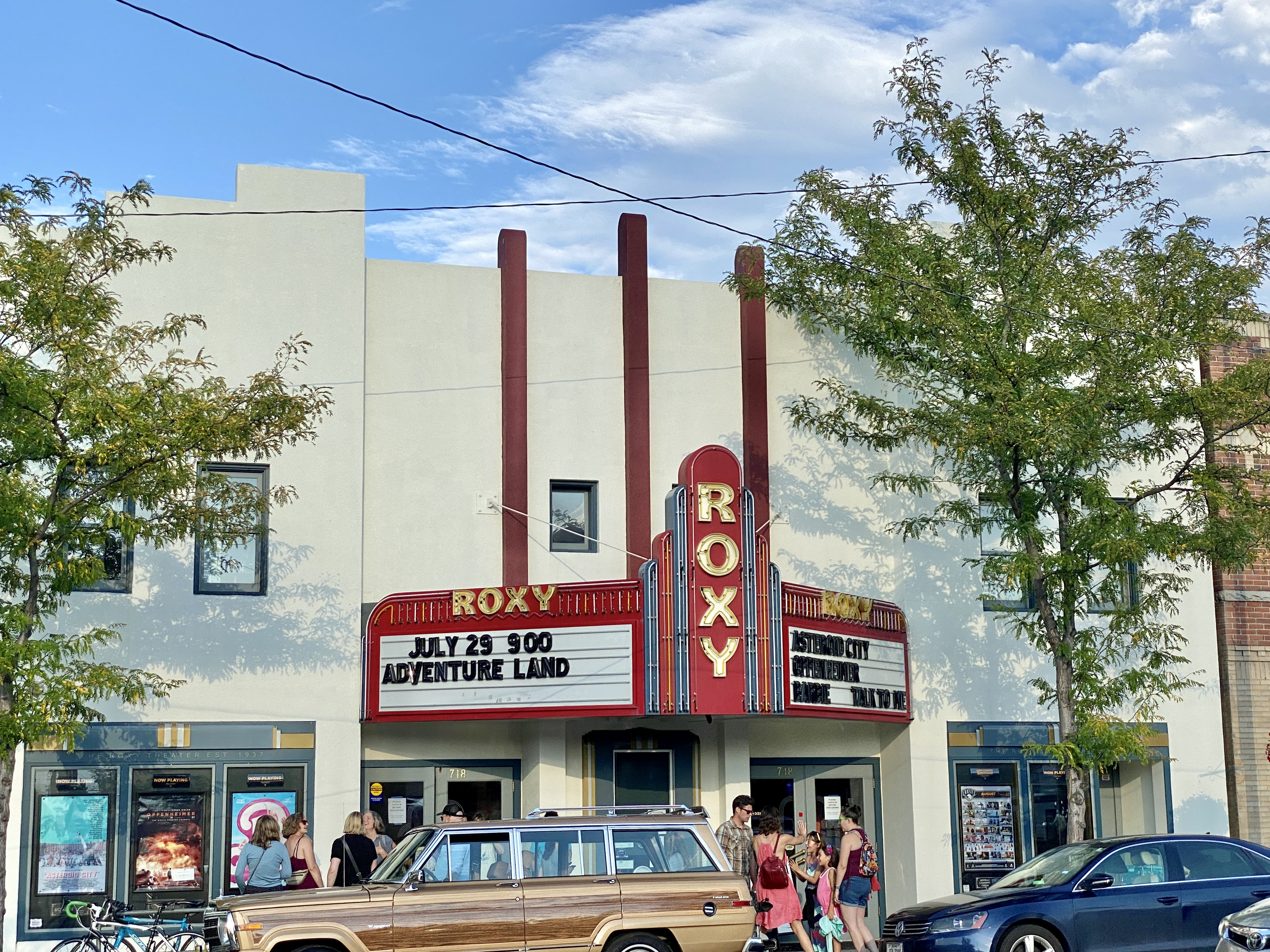
- Interactive map of The Roxy Theater
- Address: Missoula, Montana
- Coordinates: 46.8644°N 113.9971°W
- Screens: 4

Construction
- Opened: September 24, 1937
- Renovated: 1994

Website
- https://www.theroxytheater.org/

The Roxy Theater, or The Roxy, is a non-profit, community owned movie theater in Missoula, Montana. The theater opened on September 24, 1937. As of 2026, it has four screens. They host the International Wildlife Film Festival and Big Sky Documentary Film Festival annually.

== History ==
=== Opening through 1969 ===
The Roxy Theater opened on September 24, 1937 as a second-run theater.

In the 1960s, the theater was run by Edward “Eddie” Sharp. He inherited the Roxy from opera singer Edna Wilma Simons, who was the namesake of the Wilma Theatre, also in Missoula.

=== 1970s and 1980s ===
In the 1970s, the Roxy was a full-time adult movie theater and it became a dollar theater in the 1980s.

=== 1994 fire ===
On February 19, 1994, a fire burned a huge portion of The Roxy Theater. The fire was ruled as arson and remains unsolved. The theater rebuilt and reopened in 1997 with three screens. However, due to competing multiplex theaters, the Roxy closed again in 1999.

=== 2000s and 2010s ===
In 2001, the Roxy began to host the International Wildlife Film Festival. Other than this and occasional screenings, the Roxy otherwise remained closed until 2013. In 2013, the theater reopened for full-year programming. The theater was renovated in 2016 by the Foundation for Montana History.

=== 2020s through present day ===
During the COVID-19 pandemic, the Roxy Theater held screening events at the baseball field, Ogren Park at Allegiance Field, in partnership with the Missoula Paddleheads. They also offered small, private screenings indoors, but was otherwise closed for over 400 days. During this time, the theater upgraded its venue, including adding a fourth screen for small screenings ("The Roxy Annex") and an outdoor area ("The Roxy Garden"). The theater fully reopened in the summer of 2021.

== Events ==
The Roxy Theater has hosted the International Wildlife Film Festival since 2002.

The Roxy Theater hosts many ongoing events including Out at the Roxy featuring LGBTQ stories, an indigenous series that runs annually, and regular series of kids' movies called Roxy Jr. They also regularly host other events including movies with discussions afterwards and stand-up comedy.
