= International Wildlife Film Festival =

The International Wildlife Film Festival is a film festival held annually at the Roxy Theater in Missoula, Montana.

The International Wildlife Film Festival was "the first regular ongoing festival devoted solely to wildlife films" and this "signaled that wildlife films had arrived as a motion picture genre distinct from others". It is a juried event that lasts eight days and "involves the world's top wildlife filmmakers, producers, scientists and conservation leaders", and up to 12,000 people attend. The festival, which was "founded by internationally known bear biologist Dr. Charles Jonkel in 1977, recognizes scientific accuracy, artistic appeal, and technical excellence". Jonkel was described in 1989 as "an appropriately grizzled wildlife biologist acclaimed for his work with bears." He taught at the University of Montana and was also head of the Rocky Mountain Film Institute.

The festival was originally held at the University of Montana. In 2002 they purchased the Roxy Theater. The theater then sat mostly dormant until the 2013 festival. Newly hired Executive Director Mike Steinberg worked on the mission of IWFF to show wildlife film throughout the year.

During the COVID-19 pandemic the festival held only virtual events for two years. It reopened for its 45th year in 2022. The festival decided to continue virtual events alongside in person ones so a wider audience could see the films.

In 2025 the festival used four venues:Roxy Theater, The Wilma, Dennison Theatre, University of Montana UC Theater. There were 297 film submissions and 3,181 attendees.

The WildWalk Parade has opened the festival for more than 30 years. During the parade people dress up as their favorite flora or fauna. At the end of the route is the WildFest with live music, food vendors, and activities.

== Staff ==
- Development Director of The Roxy Theater - Tammy Bodlovic
- Executive Director of The Roxy Theater - Sarah Ferguson
- Film Festival Coordinator - Josh Moyar
