= Florence Hotel =

Florence Hotel may refer to:

- Hotel Florence, a former hotel in Chicago, Illinois
- Florence Hotel, Florence, Kentucky; listed on the National Register of Historic Places in Boone County, Kentucky
- Florence Hotel (Missoula, Montana), listed on the National Register of Historic Places

== See also ==
- Florence Hotel Tree, a San Diego Historic Landmark
