= Wilma Theater =

Wilma Theater may refer to:

- Wilma Theater (Philadelphia)
- Wilma Theatre (Missoula, Montana)
