= Greenough Park =

Park in Missoula County, Montana, United States

- Interactive map of Greenough Park
- Location: Missoula, Montana, United States
- Coordinates: 46°52′37.6″N 113°58′35.8″W
- Area: 42 acres (17 ha)
- Established: 1902

Greenough Park is a natural park covering 42 acres in Missoula, Montana, dedicated to the city by the Greenough family. Donated in 1902, it is Missoula's first park. Rattlesnake Creek flows through the boundaries, creating a riparian habitat.

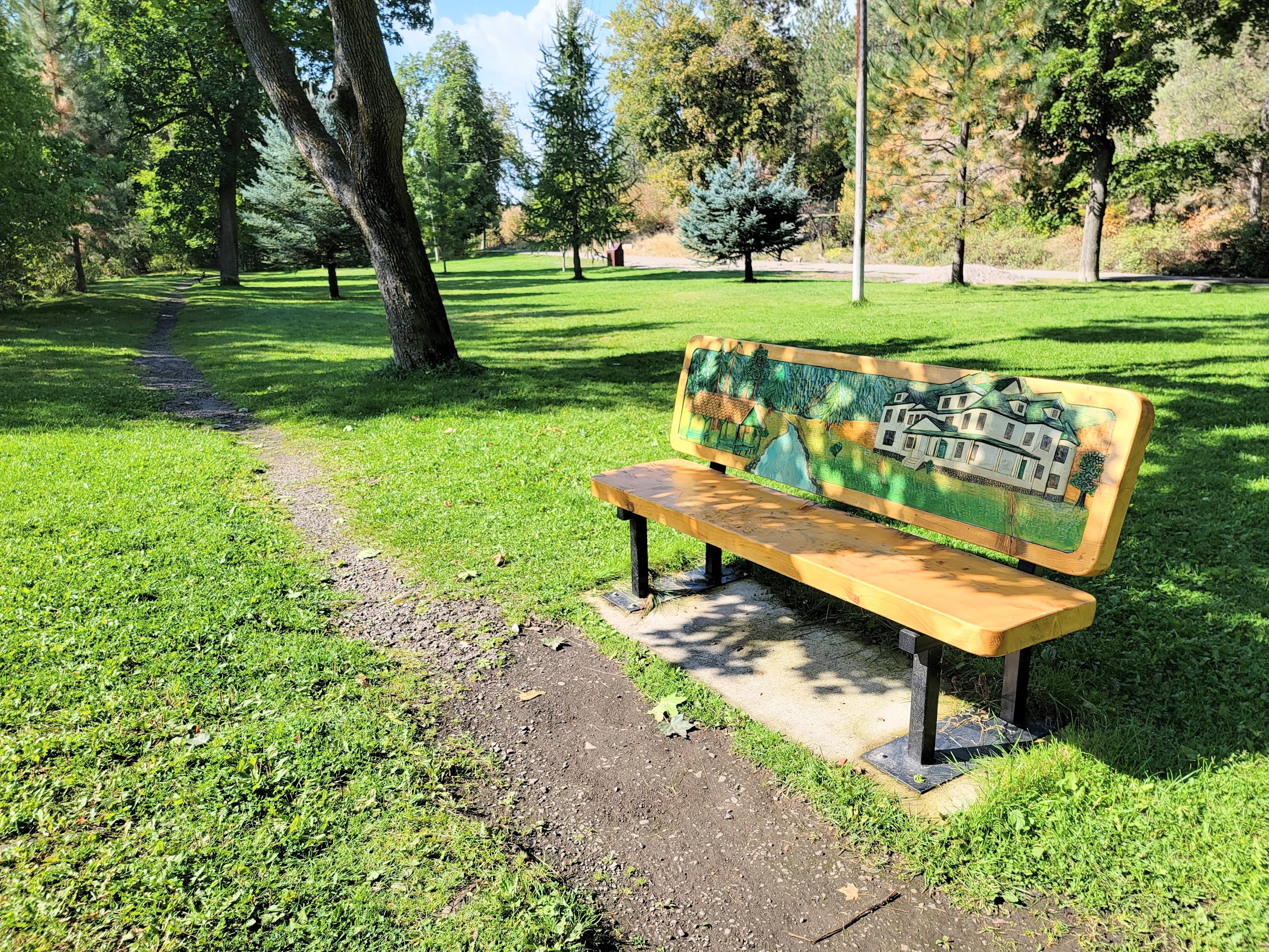
Park bench depicting the Greenough mansion built near this spot in the 1890s and moved to make way for Interstate 90 to go through Missoula.

== Man-made features ==
Greenough Park hosts a pavilion, horseshoe pits, trails, a bathroom facility, playground and picnic tables. The main trail is one mile long, paved for bicycle and pedestrian travel The Greenough Family's mansion was previously in the area, before being moved to make way for Interstate 90; on the park Greenough is quoted as saying, "a comfortable retreat... to which the people of Missoula may during the heated days of summer, the beautiful days of autumn, and the balmy days of spring, find a comfortable, romantic, and poetic retreat."

== Flora and fauna ==
=== Fauna ===
Despite its close proximity to Downtown Missoula, Greenough Park is visited by a rich diversity of bird species, including the great horned owl, American dipper, pileated woodpecker, and cedar waxwing. Mammals which frequent the park include white-tailed deer and American black bear.

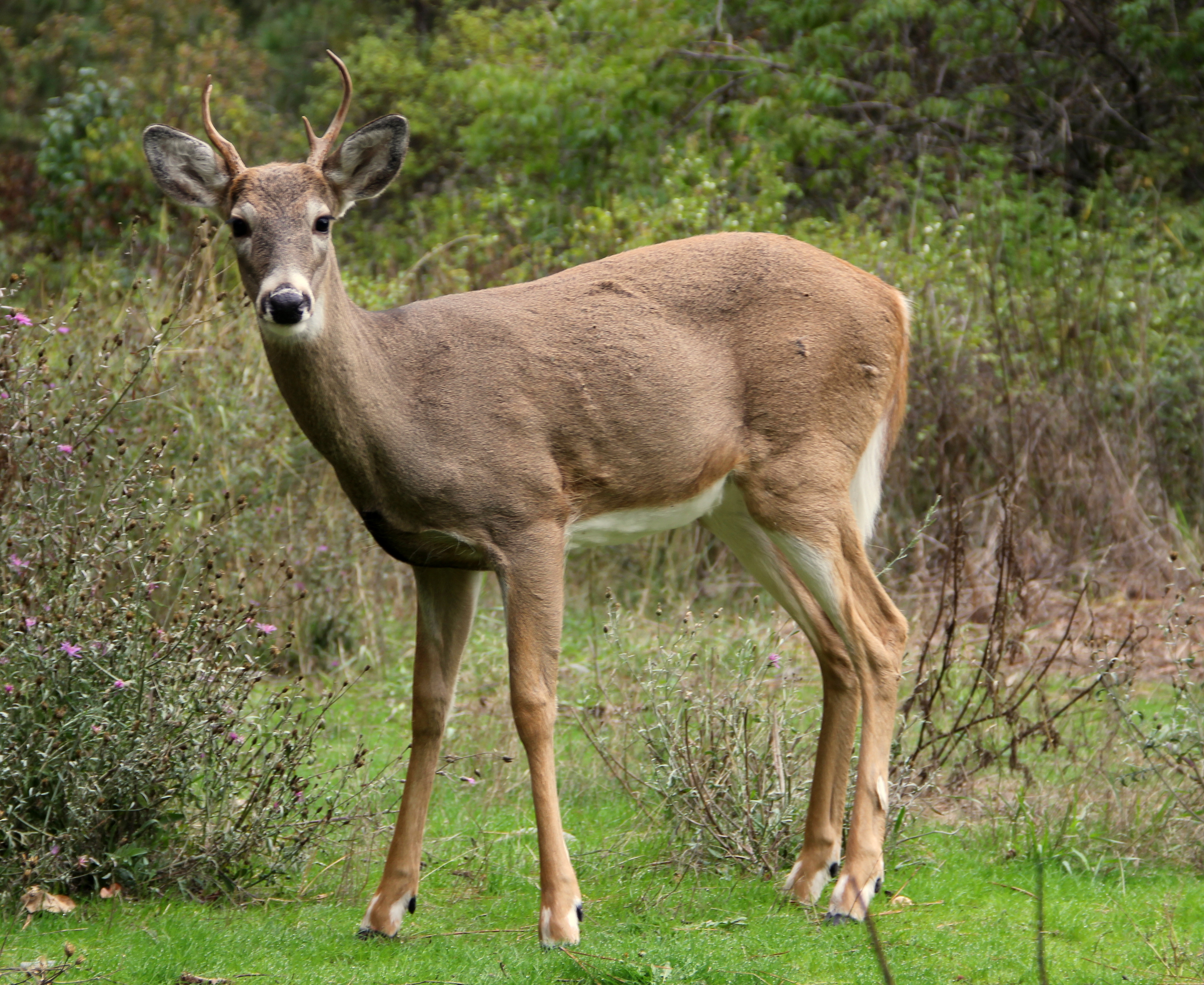
White-tailed deer at Greenough Park, Missoula

=== Flora ===
Greenough Park is heavily vegetated, with tree species including Populus trichocarpa, invasive Norway maple, ponderosa pine, and douglas fir

== Events ==
The annual Missoula Tweed Ride passes through the park and stops for tea, raising funds for Free Cycles community bike shop. In the Tweed Ride, contestants dress in vintage clothing and bike at a leisurely pace along a five-mile loop.
