= Palace Hotel (Missoula, Montana) =

- Interactive map of the Palace Hotel area

General information
- Type: Residential
- Location: Missoula, Montana
- Completed: 1909

Height
- Height: 70 feet (21 m)

Technical details
- Floor count: 6

Design and construction
- Architect: James R. Mcdonald
- Palace Hotel
- U.S. National Register of Historic Places
- Location within Montana Location within the United States
- Location: 147 W. Broadway; Missoula, Montana
- Coordinates: 46°52′20″N 113°59′44″W
- Area: less than one acre
- Built: 1909
- Architect: S. R. Witwer
- Architectural style: Modern Movement
- NRHP reference No.: 82000594
- Added to NRHP: October 25, 1982

The Palace Hotel is a building located in Downtown Missoula, Montana. Built in 1909, it became one of Missoula's first multi-story hotels. Today, the building houses apartments. Its architectural style is Renaissance revival. The building was added to the National Register of Historic Places in 1982.

== History ==
The building opened in 1909 as a full-service hotel. Its structural system is a rigid frame; Its facade system is applied masonry, and it has a concrete base.
