= A Carousel for Missoula =

Carousel in Missoula, Montana

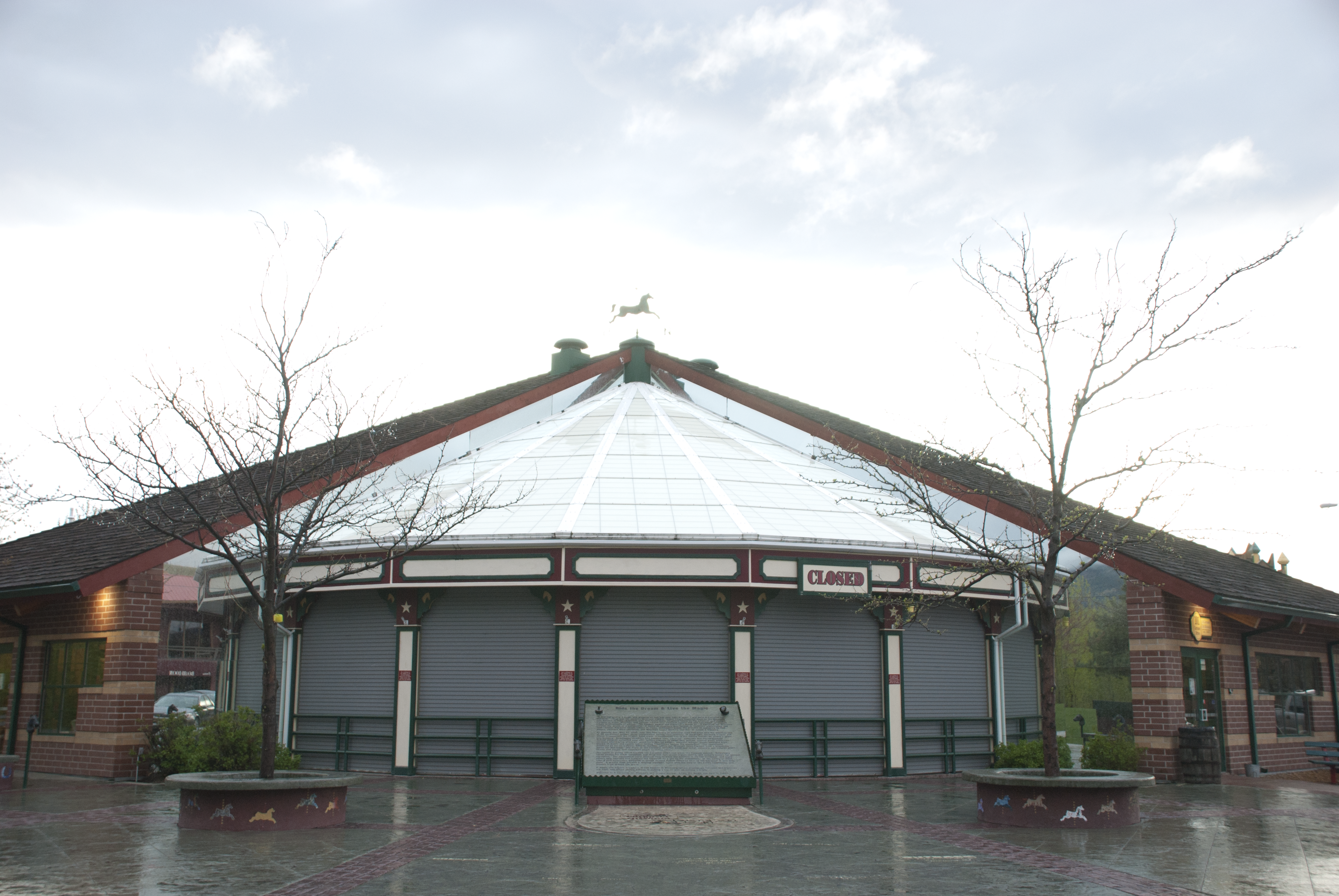
- Cold weather forces the carousel to shut its roll-down metal doors on April 13, 2010. Typically these doors remain open to reveal the carousel during warmer months.

Ride statistics
- Attraction type: Carousel

A Carousel for Missoula is a volunteer-built, hand-carved carousel in Missoula, Montana, located on the Clark Fork River in Missoula's downtown Caras Park within walking distance of the historic Wilma Theatre, Jeannette Rankin Peace Center and Osprey baseball stadium. The carousel is accompanied by a volunteer-built park, Dragon Hollow.

== Vision ==
A mother and child enjoy a ride on the pony named Paint, at A Carousel for Missoula on April 13, 2010.

The vision for A Carousel for Missoula began in 1988 when Missoula cabinet maker Chuck Kaparich visited a carousel in Spokane, Washington, and read the story of Charles I. D. Looff, "a Danish immigrant who created Spokane's now-antique carousel as a wedding present for his daughter Emma."

Inspired by the beauty and craftsmanship of the ponies, Kaparich decided he wanted to buy a carousel horse for himself. In 1990 he contacted Frederick Fried, carousel expert and author of A Pictorial History of Carousels.

When Kaparich expressed his interest in purchasing a carousel horse, Fried responded with, "It's vultures like you who are causing the demise of the American carousel. If you want a carousel horse, don't take it off a carousel; carve your own."

So Kaparich did.

By August 1991, Kaparich had carved four ponies. He approached the Missoula City Council with a deal: he would provide the mechanical works, frame, horses and chariots if the city would give the carousel a permanent home. The council agreed, and a board from the Missoula Redevelopment Agency was formed to oversee the project.

Three years later, on February 12, 1993, Fried, after seeing pictures of the completed carousel ponies and plans for A Carousel for Missoula, wrote a letter to Kaparich and head carver John Thompson. Fried commented on the professionalism of the carving and called Missoula "a shining example to the rest of the United States, inspiring other townships to create their own home-and-hand-made carousels."

== History ==
In 1918 the Alan Herschell-Spillman Company of North Tonawanda, New York, created a 38-animal carousel adorned with dogs, frogs, zebras, and roosters as well as horses.

In 1959, Bob Anderson of California erected the Herschell-Spillman carousel at Incline Village amusement park near Lake Tahoe, Nevada, better known as Ponderosa Ranch where the 1960s television western Bonanza was filmed. By 1959 the carousel had undergone significant wear, and many of the original animals were switched for less elaborate ones.

The carousel continued to operate in Nevada until 1983, when it was dismantled and the animals were sold at auction. The frame was sold to a secondhand dealer, then to a museum curator in Polson, Montana. The Montana man purchased the frame because it came as part of a package deal with a small children's train.

In 1991 the frame was sold to Chuck Kaparich of Missoula for $3,000.

The frame, weighing approximately 10 1/2 tons when fully loaded with ponies and chariots, has over 16,000 parts. Before being assembled in its current Missoula location, the volunteer mechanical crew of A Carousel for Missoula replaced the frame's bolts and cleaned and repainted the other pieces.

Originally, the carousel operated on a steam-powered, leather belt-driven motor. A Carousel for Missoula replaced it with a 10-horsepower motor with a fluid clutch.

== Funding and building ==
Funds to pay for A Carousel for Missoula's carving materials came from auctions and pony "adoptions". Families, businesses, and individuals could pay $2,500 to name, design and adopt a carousel pony. Four horses were adopted by Missoula school children who collected 1 million pennies, or $10,000, for the cause. The Missoula Building Industry Association adopted a chariot and designed it to be accessible for wheelchair users.

In July 1992, all 38 horses and both chariots on A Carousel for Missoula were adopted by donors in the Missoula area, ultimately raising $100,000 in cash and pledges.

In March 1992 the carousel was designated for a site in the west end of Missoula's Caras Park. The Missoula Redevelopment Agency Board voted to sponsor a design competition among interested architects to develop designs for the carousel building. J. Kirby and Associates of Missoula won the competition with their "jewel box" design.

In 1994, over $200,000 for building construction were raised through auctions, private donations and band organ song "adoptions". An additional $58,000 came from donations of materials and labor.

A Carousel for Missoula was officially completed on May 27, 1995.

About five years later, volunteers reunited to build an addition to A Carousel for Missoula; an outdoor park named Dragon Hollow. Many Missoula individuals and businesses donated time, materials and money to complete the park.

In December 2000, Rosemary Gallagher donated $25,000 to Dragon Hollow. The Dennis & Phyllis Washington Foundation also pledged $15,000.

Home Depot of Missoula sponsored the park's birthday pavilion, and every Missoula Home Depot employee volunteered to help with construction. In spring of 2001, over 4,000 volunteers built Dragon Hollow in nine days.

Since its opening, the carousel has given about 225,000 rides per year.

== Carving and creation ==
Kaparich teamed with design coordinator Cherry Gillespie and head carver John Thompson to design, create and oversee the completion of the ponies, chariots, band organ and artistic elements of A Carousel for Missoula. A staff composed entirely of volunteers completed the carving, sanding and painting of the 38 ponies and two chariots, as well as the other decorative pieces.

Carving classes taught over 50 volunteers how to create gargoyles, mirror frames, and the horses' legs, bodies, manes, and heads. A restoration and mechanical crew revitalized the parts and pieces of the carousel frame Kaparich had purchased.

The ponies, weighing 120 to 200 pounds (54 to 91 kg) when completed, were carved from basswood, the soft yet durable wood of linden trees. The ponies were not carved in one solid piece, but seven separate pieces: head, neck, body and four legs. Volunteers and the ponies' "adoptive" families tucked memorabilia inside the ponies' hollow bodies before they were assembled and painted.

Traditional carousel ponies come in three styles. Coney Island ponies are baroque and bejeweled, Philadelphia ponies more realistic and Country renditions more primitive. Bette Largent, who painted and restored ponies for Spokane's Looff carousel before training the volunteer painters in Missoula, said A Carousel for Missoula created a unique, distinctive style tagged as the "Garden City steeds".

In the book A Carousel for Missoula Largent said, "The Missoula ponies are accurate, but always with a good measure of whimsy and humor. They are sturdy, yet remarkable in detail." Kaparich said he believes "the diversity of Missoula's horses came from the decision to adopt them out to donors, who then had rights to the design."

Approximately 800 hours of work went into the completion of each pony.

Finally, the canopy of the carousel was adorned with 966 light bulbs, 14 carved gargoyles in frames, and 14 carved frames holding etched mirrors.

A hand-carved wooden dragon, named Lucky Red Ringer, was made as a unique way for riders to play the historical brass ring game. Plastic rings are loaded into a tube that fits inside the length of the dragon's body and exits the dragon's mouth. Lucky Red Ringer perches in a wooden hand-carved tree, close enough to the outside row of carousel horses for riders to grab the plastic rings from the dragon's mouth while the carousel is in motion. One brass ring is added to the ring tube, and the rider who grabs the brass ring wins a free ride.

Lucky Red Ringer, upon close examination, has a wedding ring carved onto his finger. Head carver Thompson added the wedding ring to the dragon's finger after his wife claimed Thompson spent more time with Lucky Red Ringer than her.

== The band organ ==
Scott Olson, a volunteer for A Carousel for Missoula, was committed to finding a band organ to complete the mood of the carousel. In April 1992, Don Stinson's band organ company in Bellefontaine, Ohio, began to construct an organ to Missoula's specifications. Olson traveled to Ohio three times that year to oversee construction of the organ. 1 1/2 years and $65,000 later, the organ arrived in Missoula.

The organ contains over 400 hand-made wooden pipes and has the sound capacity of 23 instruments. It works like a player piano, using paper song rolls. Holes in the paper rolls signal specific pipes to create music. Each roll has ten songs and plays for about 40 minutes. Several music rolls were created just for the carousel, featuring music "adopted" by local donors, such as the fight song of the University of Montana.

The organ was enclosed by an 8-foot-high, 17-foot-wide, wooden facade depicting a medieval scene with cliffs, castles, knights and dragons, all hand-carved by Glenn Watters of Missoula in less than two years.

The band organ at A Carousel for Missoula is the largest carousel band organ in continuous use in America.

== Visitor information ==
During non-public hours the carousel can be rented for private events and celebrations for 100 sit-down, or 200 standing room guests. Birthday parties or other festivities can also be scheduled during public hours.

A Carousel for Missoula is open daily, with hours subject to change seasonally:

- 11 a.m. - 5:30 p.m; Sept. through May
- 11 a.m. - 7 p.m.; June through Aug.
