= Data and Trade Building =

Data & Trade Building
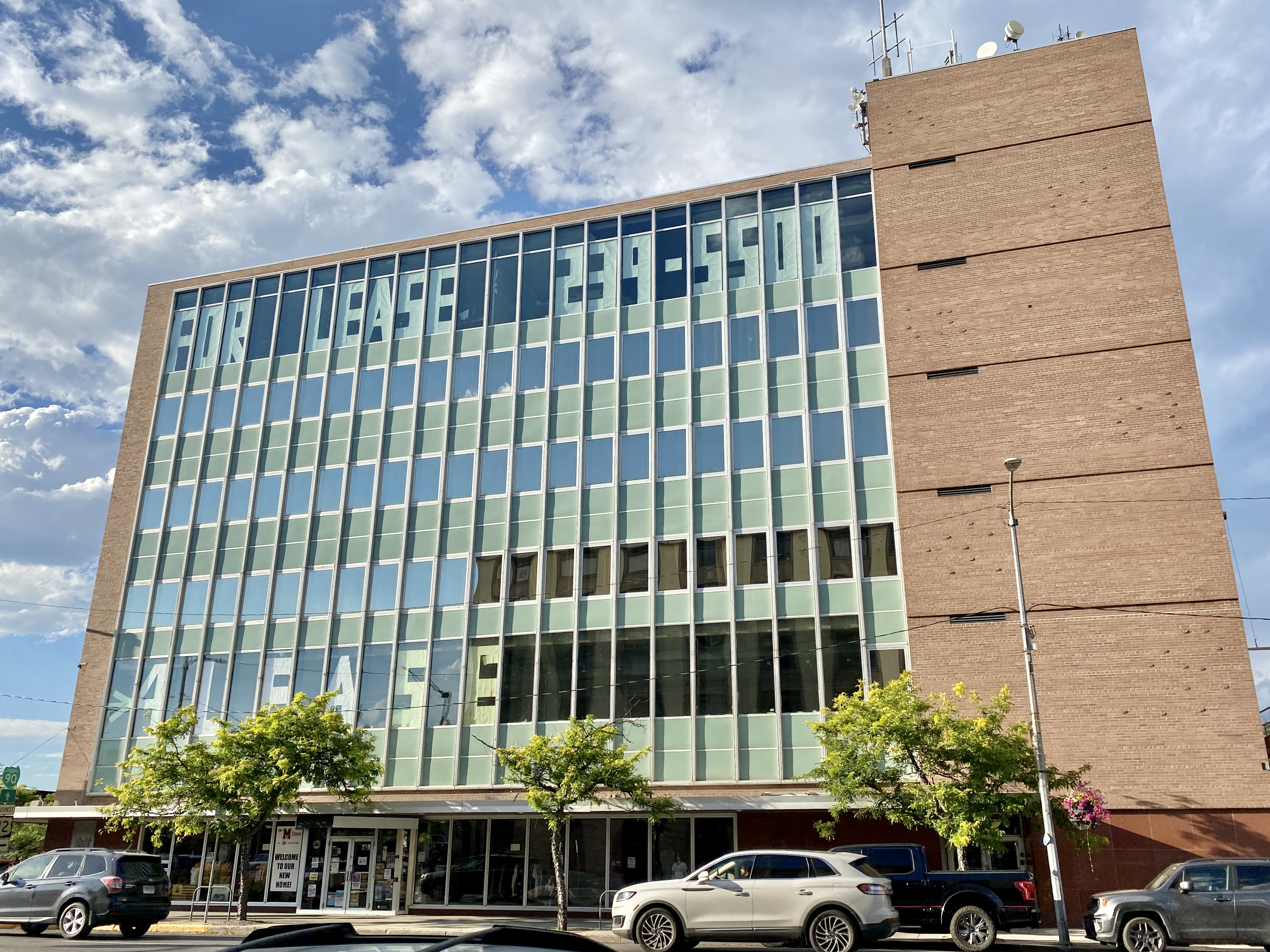
- Data and Trade Building in 2023
- Interactive map of the Data & Trade Building area

General information
- Type: Corporate offices
- Location: Missoula, Montana
- Coordinates: 46°52′19.74″N 113°59′36.96″W

Height
- Top floor: 6

Technical details
- Floor count: 6
- Lifts/elevators: 2

The Data and Trade Building is a low-rise building in the heart of Downtown Missoula, Montana. It is located at 100 East Broadway. It was previously home to the First Security Bank before they announced a relocation in March 2023.

== Purpose ==
The purpose of this building is part of the Missoula Downtown Master Plan, that the Missoula Downtown association has created to redevelop Missoula's historic buildings and attract new construction to the downtown area.

== See also ==
- Missoula, Montana
