= Mrs. Lydia McCaffery's Furnished Rooms =

- U.S. National Register of Historic Places
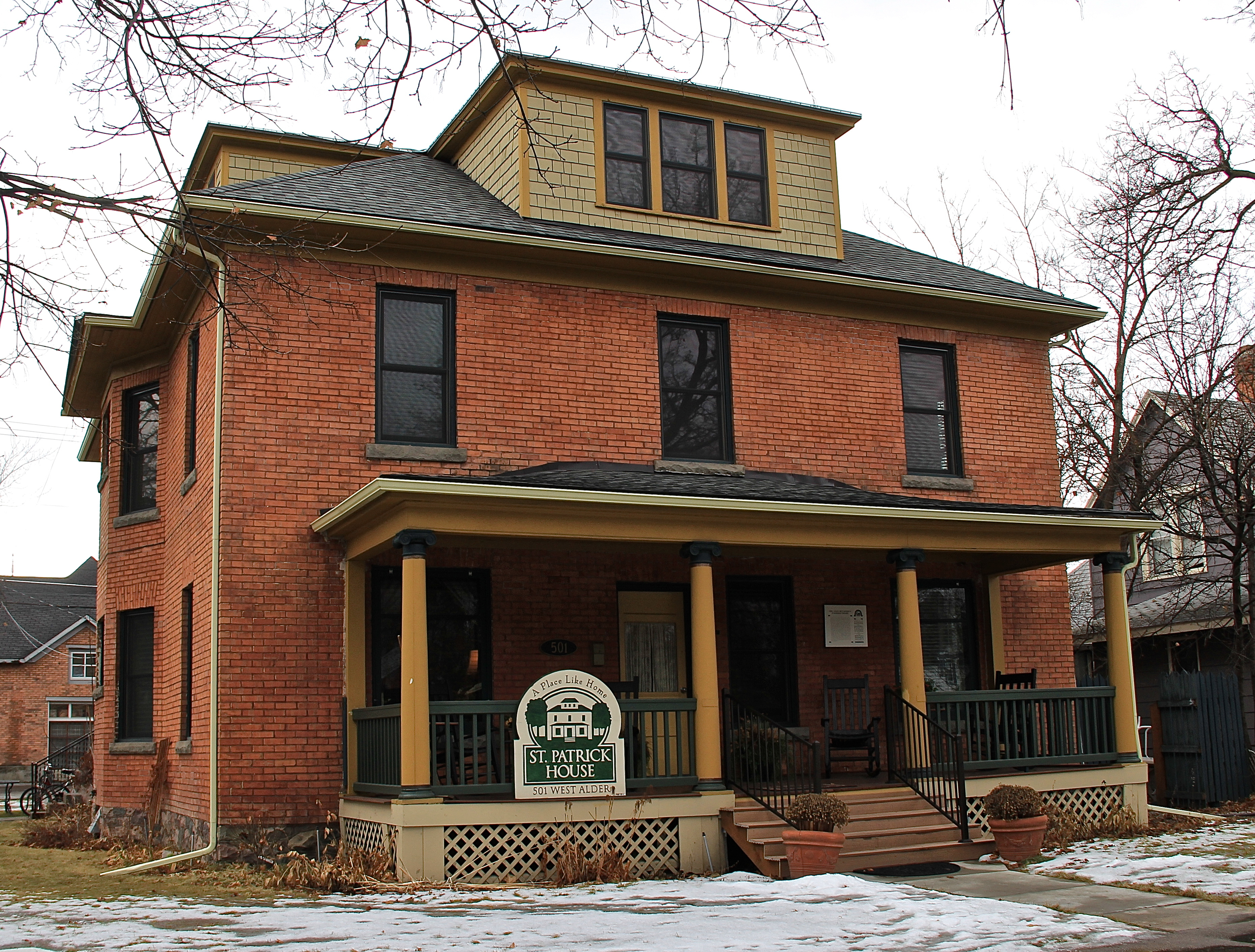

- Location within Montana Location within the United States
- Location: Missoula, Montana
- Coordinates: 46°52′35″N 113°59′50″W
- Built: 1910
- Architect: Don Carlin
- MPS: Missoula MPS
- NRHP reference No.: 00000335
- Added to NRHP: April 6, 2000

Mrs. Lydia McCaffery's Furnished Rooms, also known as the McCauley Lodging House and now known as the St. Patrick's House, is a former rooming house in Missoula, Montana. It is included in the Missoula Downtown Historic District.

It is a two-and-one-half story American Foursquare house.
