= First Interstate Center (Missoula, Montana) =

Coordinates: 46°52′11″N 113°59′42″W

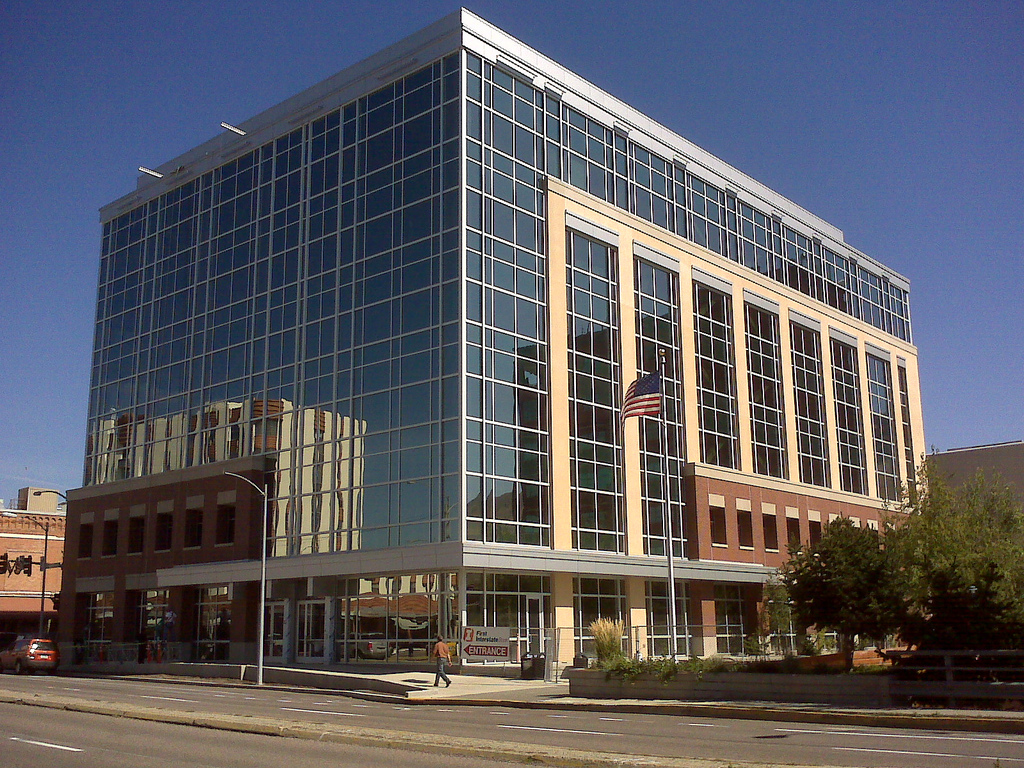
- Interactive map of the First Interstate Center area
- Alternative names: First Interstate Bank Building

General information
- Type: Corporate offices
- Location: Missoula, Montana
- Construction started: 2008
- Completed: 2009

Height
- Top floor: 6

Technical details
- Floor count: 6
- Floor area: 118,000 sq ft (11,000 m^{2})
- Lifts/elevators: 2

Design and construction
- Architect: CTA Group

The First Interstate Center, or First Interstate Bank Building, is a building in the heart of Downtown Missoula, Montana. It is located at 310 West Front Street. It is one of many post-modern buildings recently built in Missoula. Standing at 6 floors it is one of the tallest in Missoula, and with 118,000 square feet (11,000 m^{2}) of space, it is the largest square footage office building in Missoula.

== Purpose ==
The Missoula Downtown Master Plan — which the Missoula Downtown association has created — seeks to redevelop Missoula's historic buildings, and encourage new development of buildings such as this one in the cities downtown.

== Sale ==
The First Interstate Bank Building in Downtown Missoula is now for sale/lease. The price is not yet known but the entire 2-6 floors are now up for sale/lease.

== See also ==
- Missoula, Montana
