= Edna Wilma Simons =

American vaudeville dancer and light opera star

Edna Wilma Simons Sharp
- Born: Edna Wilma; 1895; Collinsville, Kentucky
- Died: July 25, 1954 (aged 58–59)
- Occupations: Dancer, opera singer, businesswoman
- Spouses: William A. Simons (m. 1921) Edward Sharp (m. 1950)

Edna Wilma Simons Sharp (1895 – July 25, 1954) was an American vaudeville dancer and light opera star of the 1920s who turned into a successful businesswoman. By 1950, she owned and operated a chain of 31 theaters in the western United States. The Wilma Theatre in Missoula, Montana, is named after her. Edna Wilma Simons died on July 25, 1954, at the age of 59.

== Personal history ==
Edna Wilma was born in Collinsville, Kentucky in 1895. She met her first husband, William A. Simons, while performing in one of his shows in Idaho. The couple married in 1921, just after Simons had completed construction on his newest Montana theater. He named it The Wilma after his bride; it was formerly called the Snead-Simons building. Following the wedding, the Simonses traveled the Northwest, putting on Wild West shows as a way to bring a rugged Montana culture to the cities of Idaho and Oregon. They built a home in Wallace, Idaho. However after suffering a stroke they maintained residences in Lolo Hot Springs, Montana. They would travel by horse and wagon; this voyage required them to cross the river some 27 times. Edna took Billy there for the warm sulfur springs water that was believed to help with stroke related injuries. They also maintained a large apartment at the Wilma Building during those times as well. Edna continued to live in this apartment. She married Edward Sharp in New York in 1950. They together maintained the W.A. Simons Amusement Company until her death in 1954.

After her 1st husband's death, she continued managing her business ventures, she continued singing and performing there, holding large parties and events in the spacious dining room of the Wilma. On Nov. 3, 1950, she married her second husband, Edward Sharp, who was nearly 21 years younger than she. They shared a love of music, as he was a pianist and vocalist. They made several recordings together, of which David B. Keith was given these to ensure they would be saved for historical reference. They wed in New York City's historic Little Church Around The Corner. The couple traveled around New York to gather decoration ideas for remodeling the Wilma Theatre. The Chapel of the Dove, a mirror image of the chapel where their wedding had taken place.

Near the end of her life, Edna Wilma Simons Sharp still was an active member of the community, volunteering for Red Cross, staying an avid member of the Episcopal Church and serving on numerous bond and relief drives. She died in her bed in the arms of Edward on July 25, 1954, leaving the business to Sharp and hefty contributions to the Shodair Children's Hospital in Helena, Montana.

== Career ==
Edna Wilma began her career as a light opera singer in Kentucky. Around 1910, she and her sister Edith started touring together. The Wilma Sisters were a hit, earning top billing on the Vaudeville circuit. They were a common act at the Tavern Cafe in Missoula's Wilma Theater, performing a variety of light operas, musical comedies, and folklore. Later, Wilma started a solo career, starring in Wild West shows across the northwestern United States.

After her first husband's death in 1937, Edna Wilma Simons became president and treasurer of the William A. Simons Amusement Co. At the time, the company included a chain of thirty one theaters across Montana, Idaho and Alaska. For the sum of $150,000, Edna Wilma Simons constructed a large theater in Wallace, Idaho that she dedicated to William A. Simons' memory. She persevered and thrived through the depression and war years, building a total of nine new theaters. A shrewd businesswoman, she also purchased a small interest in the Daily Meat Co., as well as several ranches where she raised livestock.

== Recognition ==
In honor of her accomplishments, her 2nd husband Edward Sharp added a plaque with a star to the building. "May Edna Wilma's life live on through this star, and may her accomplishments for Northwestern Theatre never be forgotten. She will be surely missed," he declared.
