= Millennium Building =

Office building in Missoula, Montana, US

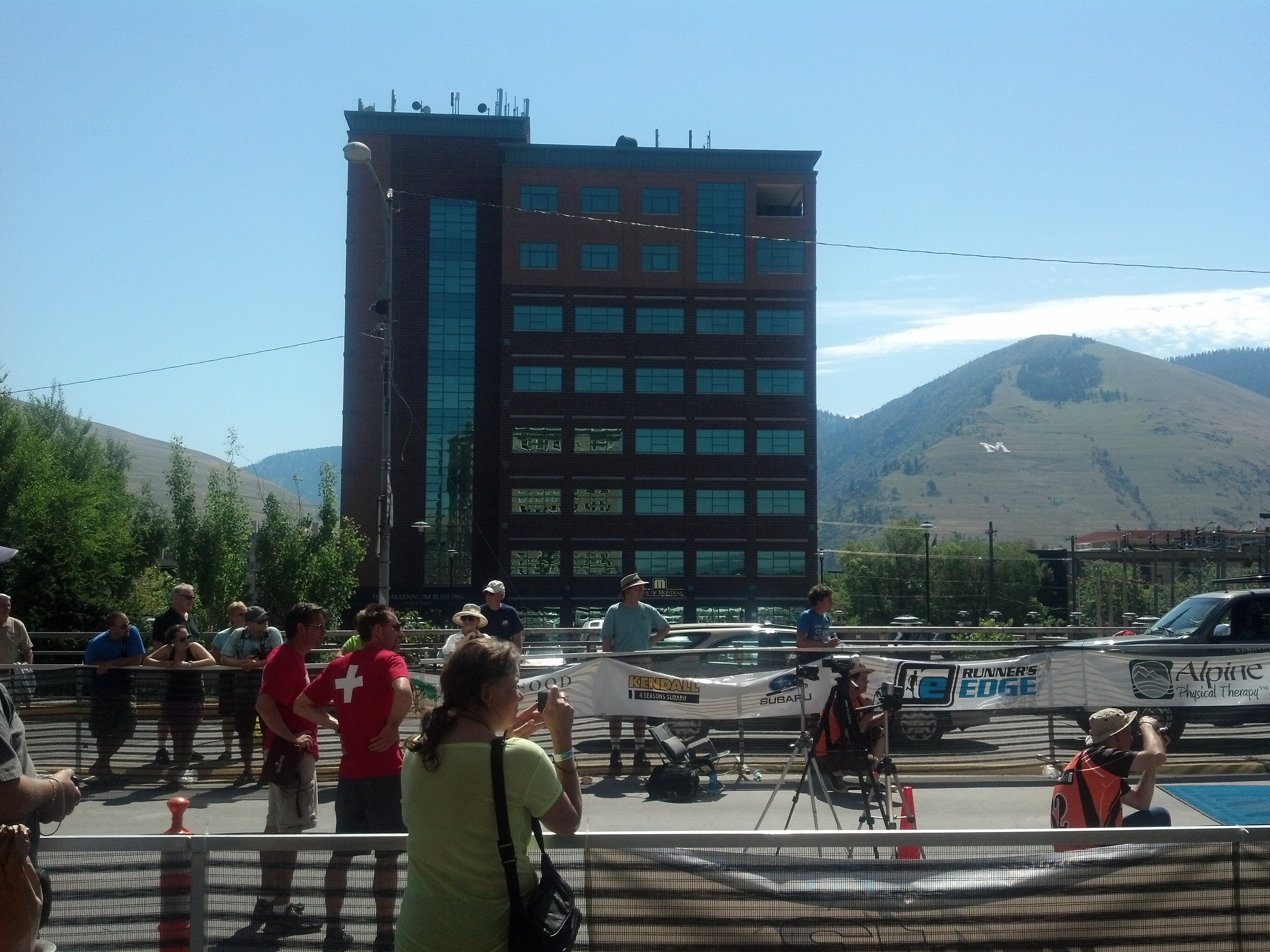

- Location within Montana

General information
- Status: Completed
- Type: Office
- Location: Missoula, Montana, United States
- Coordinates: 46°52′09″N 113°59′40″W
- Completed: 1998

Height
- Height: 39 m (128 ft)

Technical details
- Floor count: 9
- Lifts/elevators: 3

The Millennium Building is a building located in downtown Missoula, Montana, United States. At 9 floors, it is the tallest building in downtown Missoula and rises to 128 feet.

== History ==
The Millennium Building was opened in 1998.

== Tenants ==
One of the Millennium Building's main tenants is Dorsey & Whitney, who occupies the 6th floor of the building. Dorsey & Whitney is a national law firm based out of Minneapolis which maintains a small but successful satellite office in Montana.

Grundig Satellit 800, a live radio station, is also located in the Millennium Building.
