= Garlington Building (Missoula, Montana) =

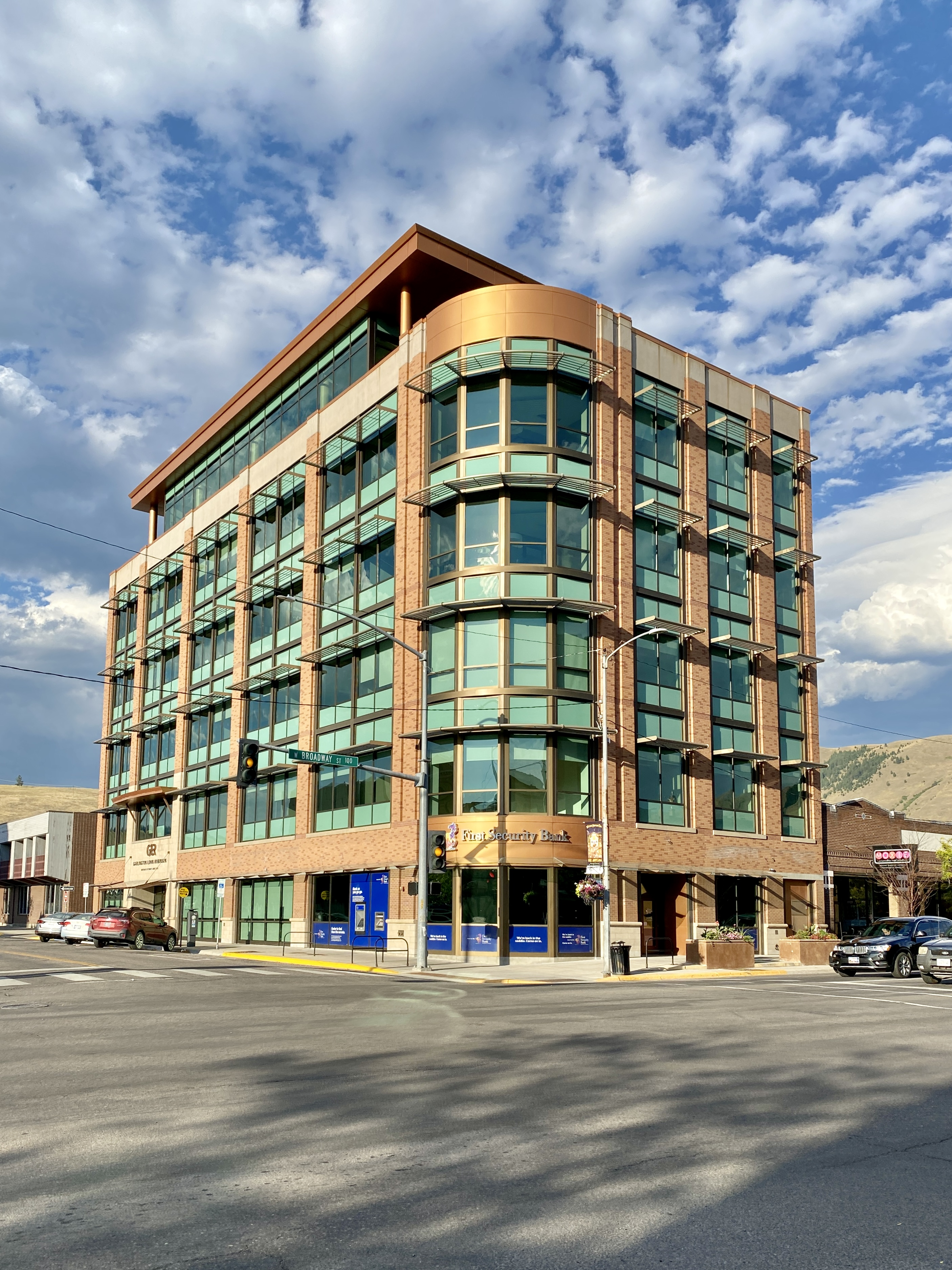
- Interactive map of the Garlington Building area

General information
- Type: corporate offices
- Location: Missoula, Montana, 350 Ryman Street
- Coordinates: 46°52′22.19″N 113°59′42.72″W
- Construction started: 2009
- Completed: 2010

Height
- Top floor: 6

Technical details
- Floor count: 6
- Floor area: 52,000 sq ft (4,800 m^{2})
- Lifts/elevators: 3

Design and construction
- Architect: OZ Architects

The Garlington Building is a building in Downtown Missoula, Montana. It is located at the 350 Ryman St. The building is a postmodern design. The building's abbreviated name is the GLR Building. It was the first project in Montana financed with federal New Markets Tax Credits.

== Purpose ==
This post-modern building fits with the Missoula Downtown Master Plan, which the city of Missoula has teamed up with the Missoula Downtown Association. The main tenant for this new building is Garlington Law Firm.

== See also ==
- Missoula, Montana
- Missoula County, Montana
