= Downtown Missoula =

- Central business district
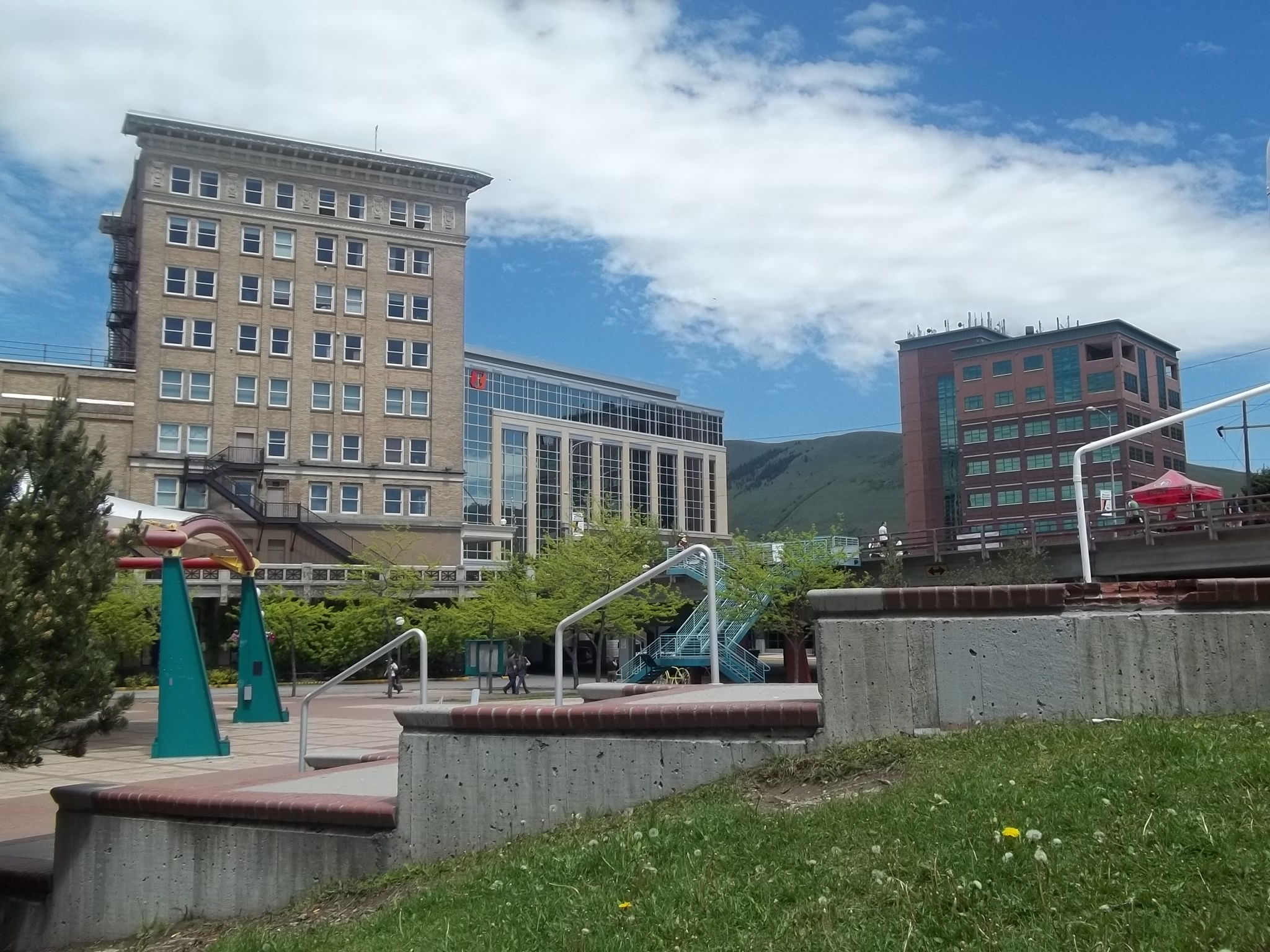
- Interactive map of Downtown Missoula
- Coordinates: 46°52′20″N 113°59′38″W
- Country: United States
- State: Montana
- City: Missoula

Government
  - Missoula City Council: John Engen

Area
  - Central business district: 2.05 sq mi (5.3 km^{2})
- Elevation: 3,199 ft (975 m)

Population (2009)
  - Central business district: 2,138
  - Urban: 68,876
  - Metro: 108,623
- Time zone: North American Mountain Time Zone
- Website: missouladowntown.com

Downtown Missoula is the central business district in Missoula, Montana, and West-Central Montana. Downtown Missoula's rough boundaries are the Clark Fork River to its south, Madison St. to its east, the old U.S 93 highway/ North Orange St. to its west, and West Alder St. to its north, though parts south of the Clark Fork River are also at times mentioned. It is home to Ogren Park at Allegiance Field which is the venue for the Missoula PaddleHeads. Downtown is also home to several parks, and historic buildings such as the Wilma Building.

== History ==
=== Early history ===
Missoula never "boomed" as many western Montana towns did as a consequence of the gold rush, though the town did grow rapidly, and by 1872 the town had 66 new buildings. Higgins and Worden established the town's first stores and banks, but by 1876 the pair faced its largest competition and rivalry from Eddy, Hammond and company, who established the Missoula Mercantile Company. By the 1880s growth had slowed, but the arrival of the Northern Pacific Railway in 1883 caused growth to accelerate again and Territorial Governor Benjamin F. Potts approved a charter for the Town of Missoula. The need for lumber for the railway and its bridges spurred the opening of multiple saw mills in the area and, in turn, the beginning of Missoula's lumber industry. The economic frenzy led to the construction of many of the historic buildings in downtown today. In particular, architect A. J. Gibson arrived in the late 1880s and designed many of Missoula's most recognizable buildings, including the Missoula County Courthouse and the University of Montana's Main Hall. Ole Bakke created and constructed the Wilma Building, the first steel-framed structure in Missoula (second in Montana) at its completion in 1921.

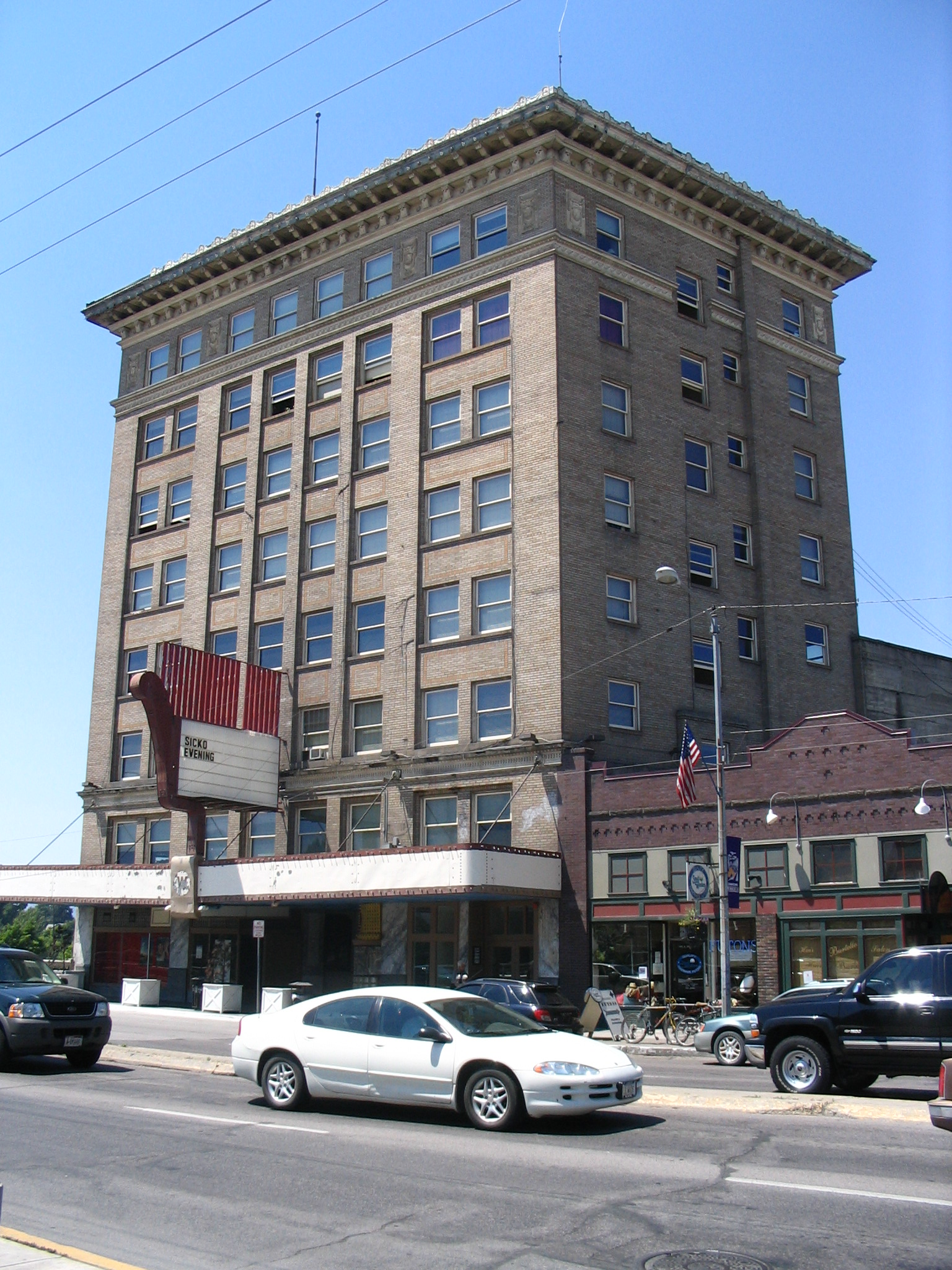
The Wilma Building

=== 20th century and modern times ===
Some significant events in the 20th century in Downtown Missoula included: Street cars being introduced in 1910 (but were replaced by buses in 1932). In 1969 the current city hall was completed. The last passenger train left from Missoula in 1979. A carousel for Missoula opened in May 1995. The Modern era began when all the logging yards in Missoula, once the basis of Missoula's economy, had totally vanished. After logging vanished the Missoula Downtown association was formed. Some of Missoula's largest modern buildings include: the First Interstate Center, the First Security Bank, the new St. Patrick Hospital and Health Sciences Center, and the tallest Building in downtown, the Millennium Building. The Garlington Building (Missoula, Montana) was completed in Fall of 2010; adding another building to the skyline of Missoula. Currently under construction is the East Front Parking structure. It was scheduled to be completed in Fall of 2012.

=== Current ongoing Projects ===
==== Sawmill District restoration (mill site) ====
The Sawmill district is an ongoing restoration project. It is the restoration of a former mill site near downtown Missoula. A mix of residential and commercial use, it has a wide range of housing densities and scales. Once completed it will provide a prime opportunity in close proximity to downtown with the advantages of open space, such as the new silver park and the Clark Fork river. The project will include a mix of low, medium, and high density housing. The project will also include several new streets. One new street will connect Wyoming st. and Cregg lane, in which will also provide a new link from Russel street and Orange street. Several other new streets will be made horizontally from this main connection. Silver park will also be a new addition to the site; it will be 14 acres with full accommodations such as a green space common area, shelters, playgrounds, artwork, a new parking lot, and a boat ramp for the Clark Fork river.

==== Russell street apartment complex ====
A local development firm has started construction on a 224-unit apartment complex, and the first unit is set to open by July 2013. A 19.5 million dollar project, the complex will occupy a vacant space on Russell street in close proximity to downtown Missoula. Demolition of the site began in January 2013. Along with apartments for low- to medium-income housing, it will include commercial buildings at some point along Russell street. Considered a "mini" community by the firm, it will include a 3,500 sq. foot clubhouse, a pool, and a movie theater.

== Higgins and Front ==
The Higgins and Front area of downtown is considered the center of downtown. It began to grow in the late 19th century and has been growing since. In the early 20th century this part of downtown had electrified streetcars. Its last run in the city was in January 1932. Brick street's were replaced in the 1940s and 1960s. This area has received national recognition for preserving historic properties. Most of Missoula's main downtown buildings in the city are here. They include the Wilma Building, and Wilma Theatre. Others include the Millennium Building, the First Interstate Center, the Florence Hotel, and the newly constructed Garlington Building.

== Buildings ==
Aber Hall, standing at 11 floors on the campus of the University of Montana, is the tallest building in Missoula, along with its twin, Jesse Hall. The only other high-rise in Missoula is the Millennium Building which is 9 floors. Some other historic, and or Post-modern building's in Missoula include: The Wilma Building, The Garlington Building, and the Florence Hotel. Missoula is home to over 60 buildings on the National Register of Historic Places.

=== Tallest buildings ===
Place	Address	Floors	Year(s) built	Primary use
Millennium Building	125 Bank Street	9	1996–98	office/residential
Wilma Building (historic)	131 S. Higgins Ave	8	1921	Theatre/residential
Florence Hotel	111 N. Higgins Ave.	7	1941	Hotel/residential
Park Place parking structure	201 East front st	7 (2 below ground)	2010–2012	Parking structure/retail
First Interstate Center	101 E. Front Street	6	2008–09	office
First Security Bank	100 E. Broadway	6		office
Garlington Building	138 West Broadway	6	2010	Office

== Cityscape ==
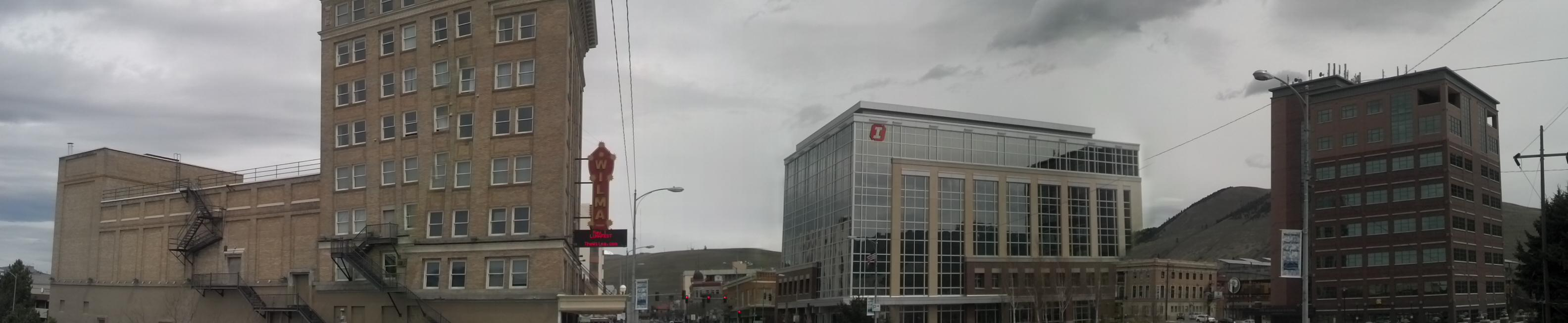
Viewing north towards Higgins Avenue.

== Geography ==
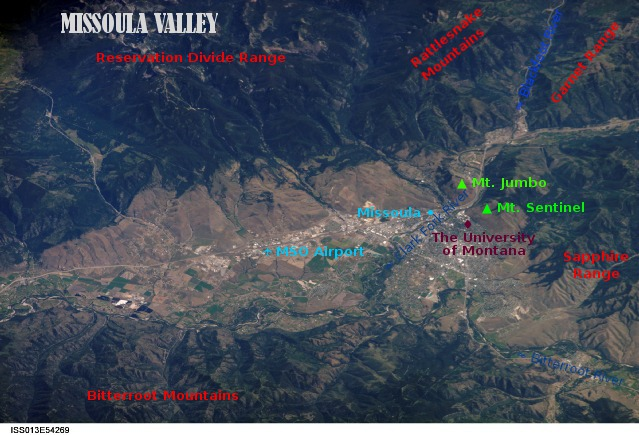
Downtown Missoula and the rest of the city.

Downtown Missoula is mostly flat except for parts of the Clark Fork River. Since downtown Missoula is located in a valley with the rest of the city it can have un-level terrain at times but overall anyone could surpass the low riding terrain of Missoula. The University of Montana district is located just upstream of the Clark Fork River which makes downtown even more busy during the school's session(s)'. Downtown Missoula also has two main parks in its downtown district. Downtown Missoula has also suffered from smog in the past, resulting in pollution.

=== Enlarging downtown ===
Downtown has had numerous new small businesses move into the area, and several organizations; one of which started right in downtown itself; the Missoula Downtown Association. The MDA (MDA) has been a large organization recently in Missoula. The MDA formed in 1975 and has organized nearly every event that has met together in the downtown area for the past several decades. With the help of the Missoula Downtown Association, downtown's main venue recently has been Caras Park; which is right next to the heart of Downtown Missoula, and the Missoula carousel.

== Missoula Art Museum ==
The Missoula Art Museum was founded in 1975, and has been accredited by the American Alliance of Museums since 1987.

MAM maintains a permanent collection held in trust for the people of Missoula County, with a specific commitment to collecting and exhibiting contemporary art by American Indian artists and that of the Montana Modernists.

== Parks ==
=== Caras Park ===
The Caras Park Pavilion is located in the heart of Downtown Missoula on the Clark Fork River. With the help of the Missoula Downtown Association, Caras Park has been the main venue to these yearly events: A Carousel for Missoula, a hand carved carousel built by volunteers is located adjacent to Caras Park

- Out to Lunch
- Downtown ToNight
- Garden City River Rod
- International Wildlife Film Festival
- WildFest
- Parks & Recreation Kids Fest
- YMCA Riverbank Run
- First Night Missoula
- Garden City BrewFest
- Garden City LocalFest
- Hemp Fest
- GermanFest
- Concerts by Jewel
- Chris Isaak
- Los Lobos
- Santana
- Ziggy Marley and
- B.B. King

=== Kiwanis Park ===
Kiwanis Park is a park located in the Downtown Missoula district. It is the Largest park in the district, and is adjacent to the Clark Fork River, so it is most occupied during the summer.

== See also ==
- Missoula Public Library
- Missoula, Montana
- Missoula County, Montana
