= St. Francis Xavier Church (Missoula, Montana) =

Historic church in Montana, United States

- U.S. National Register of Historic Places
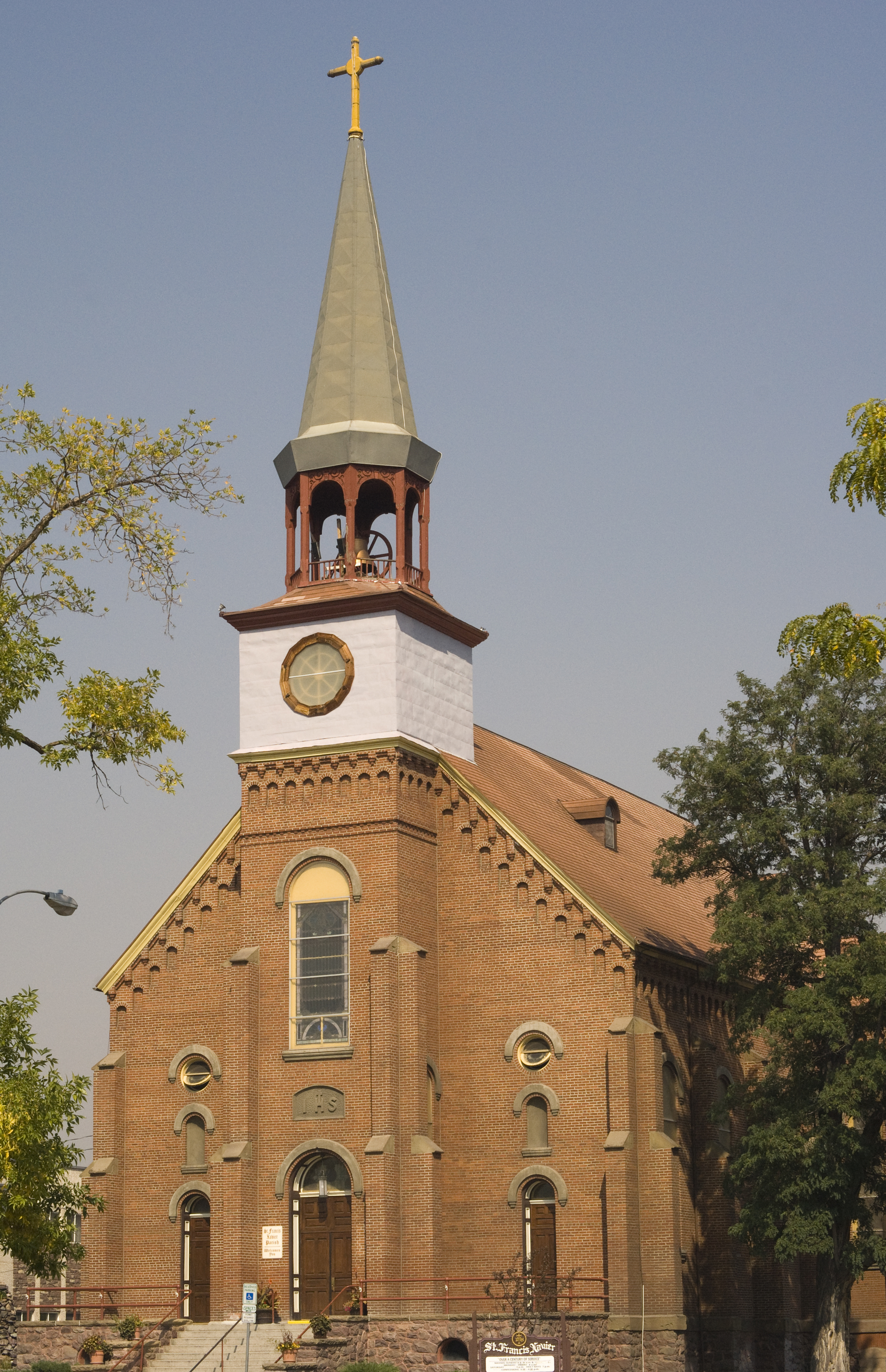
- St. Francis Xavier Church at 420 W. Pine St., Missoula, MT

- Location within Montana Location within the United States
- Location: 420 West Pine Street, Missoula, Montana 46.8749,-113.9977
- Coordinates: 46°52′28.2144″N 113°59′52.8792″W
- Area: 0.5 acres (0.20 ha)
- Built: 1892
- Architect: Mr. Blanchard of Portland, Oregon; construction overseen by Patrick H. Walsh
- Architectural style: Romanesque
- NRHP reference No.: 82003176
- Added to NRHP: April 28, 1982

The St. Francis Xavier Church in the Downtown district of Missoula, Montana, is the tallest church in Missoula, and one of the tallest in the state (by height to roof). It is also the tallest church in Missoula County, Montana. It has paintings well over 100 years old, which were done by a brother of the Society of Jesus, a kitchen helper, who painted them in his spare time. It is located at 420 West Pine Street.

== History ==
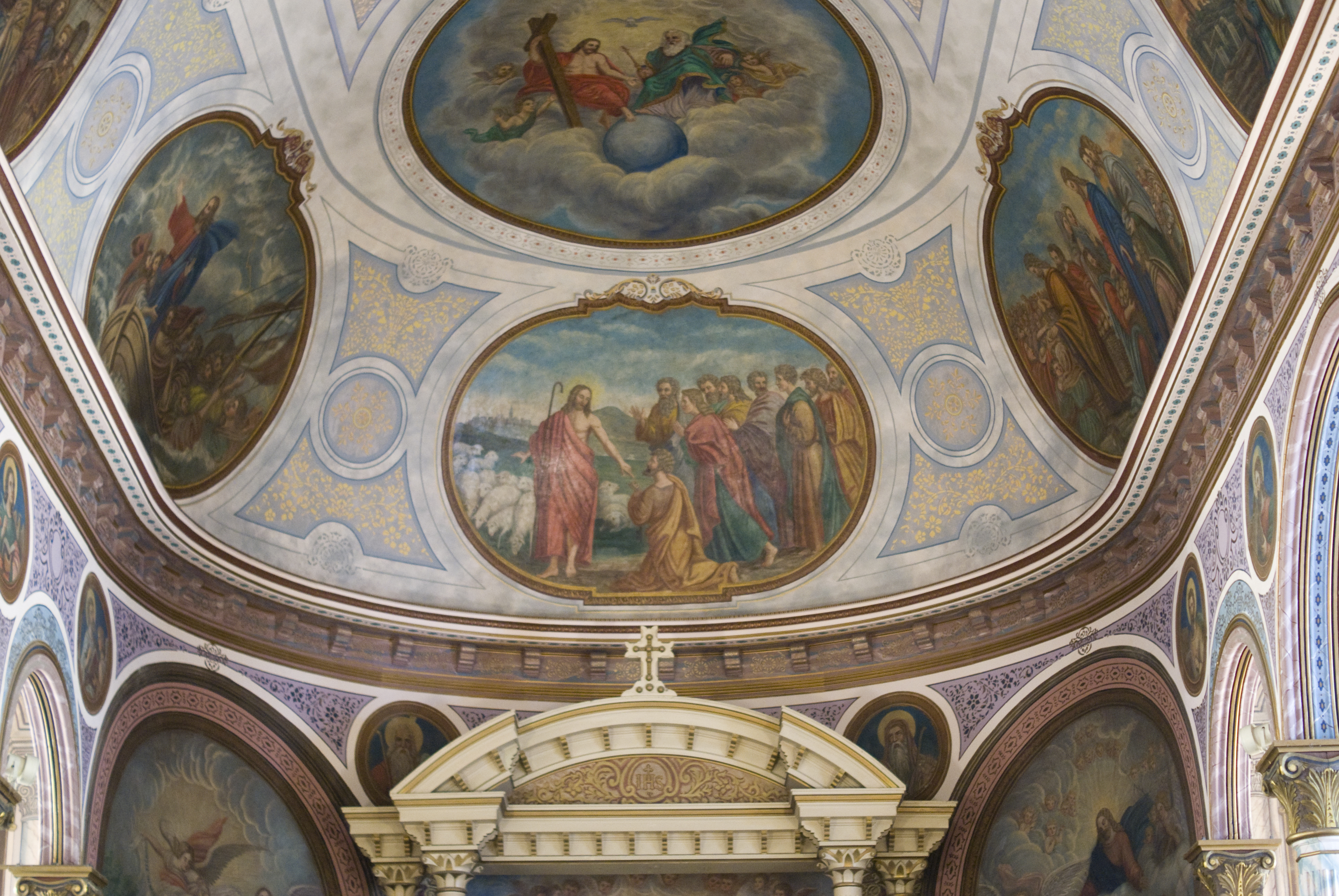
St. Francis Church interior north ceiling

Built in 1892, St. Francis Xavier is one of the tallest churches in Montana, and the tallest in the city of Missoula, and in Missoula County.

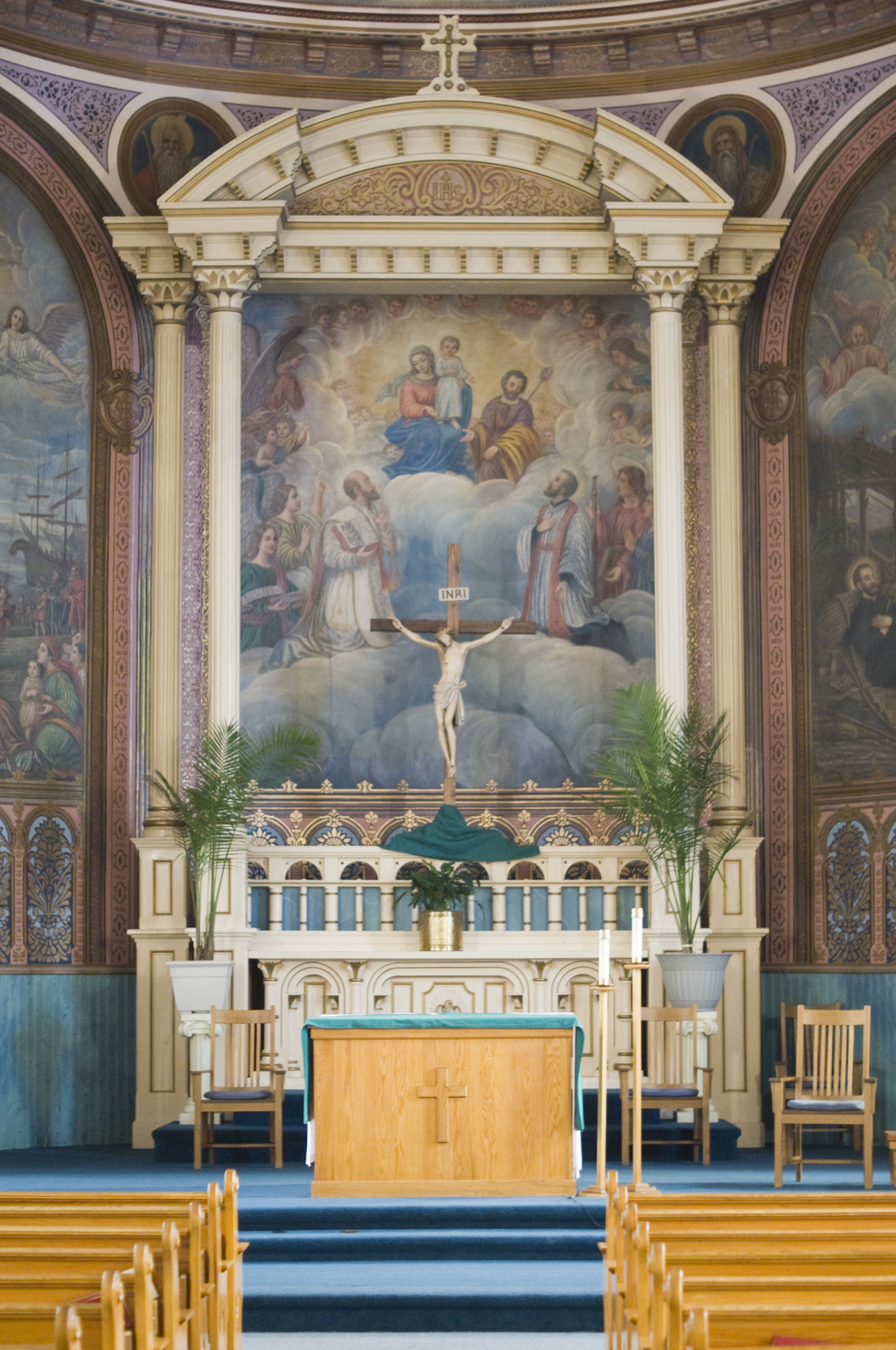
Altar and crucifix on the northern wall at St. Francis Xavier Church

The first St. Francis Xavier Church was built by Jesuits in 1881. In 1888, a Jesuit Priest named Father Diomedi arrived and hired an architect from Portland named Mr. Blanchard and a contractor from Missoula, Montana named Patrick Walsh. The church was designed to hold 600 on the main floor and another 150 in the choir loft. A description of the church can be found at www.sfxmissoula.com

When the church was built in 1892, it became the largest church in Montana. It is a cruciform church in the Romanesque Revival style. The arches over the windows and doors are semicircular, and there are smaller arches along the eave line, small buttresses, and a bell tower. Jesuit lay brother Joseph Carignano (1853–1919), who also painted the frescoes at St. Ignatius Mission, painted the interior. The church also has stained glass windows, a pipe organ, and a 2,270 pound church bell dedicated to Jesuit missionary Father Lawrence Palladino.

== See also ==
- List of Jesuit sites
