= Florence Hotel (Missoula, Montana) =

- U.S. National Register of Historic Places
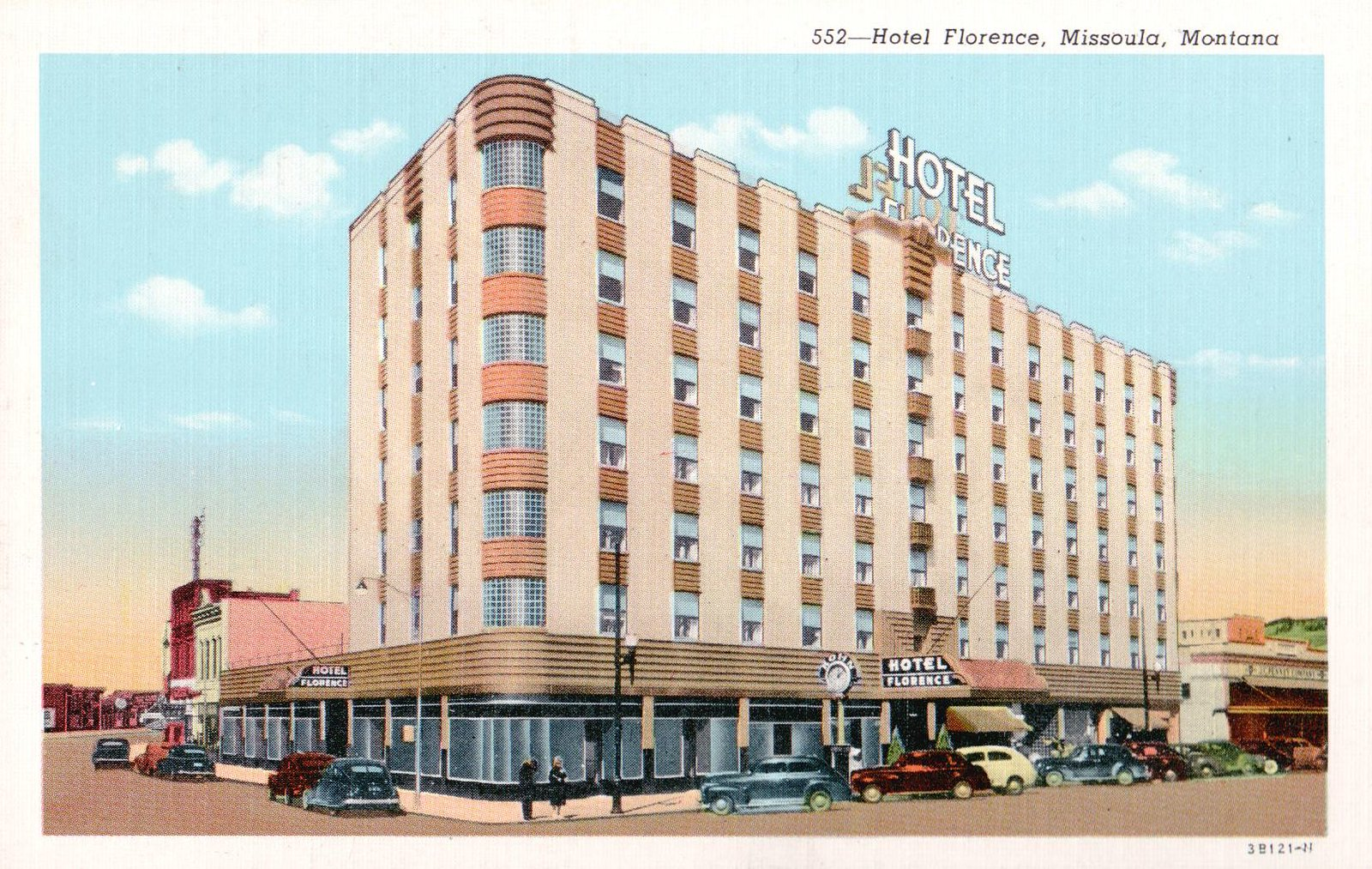

- Location within Montana Location within the United States
- Location: 111 N. Higgins Ave., Missoula, Montana
- Coordinates: 46°52′14″N 113°59′40″W
- Area: less than one acre
- Built: 1941
- Built by: Alloway & George
- Architect: G.A. Pehrson
- Architectural style: Moderne
- MPS: Missoula MPS
- NRHP reference No.: 92000782
- Added to NRHP: June 18, 1992

The Florence Hotel is a seven-story Moderne-style building in Downtown Missoula, Montana, which was completed in 1941. It was listed on the National Register of Historic Places in 1992.

Standing at 7 floors it is the 5th tallest building in Missoula. It is located at 111 North Higgins Avenue.

Since its original construction in 1888, The Florence Hotel offered weary railway travelers and settlers a comfortable night's lodging. When it burned in 1913, The Florence was rebuilt as a major 106-room hostelry and was a longtime regional gathering place until it, too, was destroyed by fire in 1936. Missoula's lack of a major hotel had serious implications, and even though the nation was then in the midst of the Great Depression, Walter H. McLeod and other influential businessmen secured community support to rebuild.

Constructed in 1941 on the same site as the two earlier buildings, today's Florence was brought to life by Spokane, Washington architect G.A. Pehrson who masterfully designed the $600,000 “jewel of a hotel” in its current Art Moderne style. For the next three decades the Florence continued to welcome visitors to downtown Missoula and Big Sky Country. In fact, “Howdy” met Hollywood when John Wayne famously slumbered at The Florence—adding to the romantic notion of the Wild West mingling with the opulent splendor of the hotel's signature style. The Florence was ahead of its time with the Northwest's first central air conditioning system, novel glass shower doors, underground parking for the growing number of Americans traveling by automobile, and first-class interior appointments in a “harmony of color.” The Florence remained a hotel until the 1970s when the building was transformed once again—this time into an office complex with retail businesses occupying the main floor.

The current owner is a structural engineer from Dallas, Texas, Thomas Taylor, whose goal has been to maintain the building's "old-fashioned" aesthetic or "nostalgic charm".
