= Wilma Theatre (Missoula, Montana) =

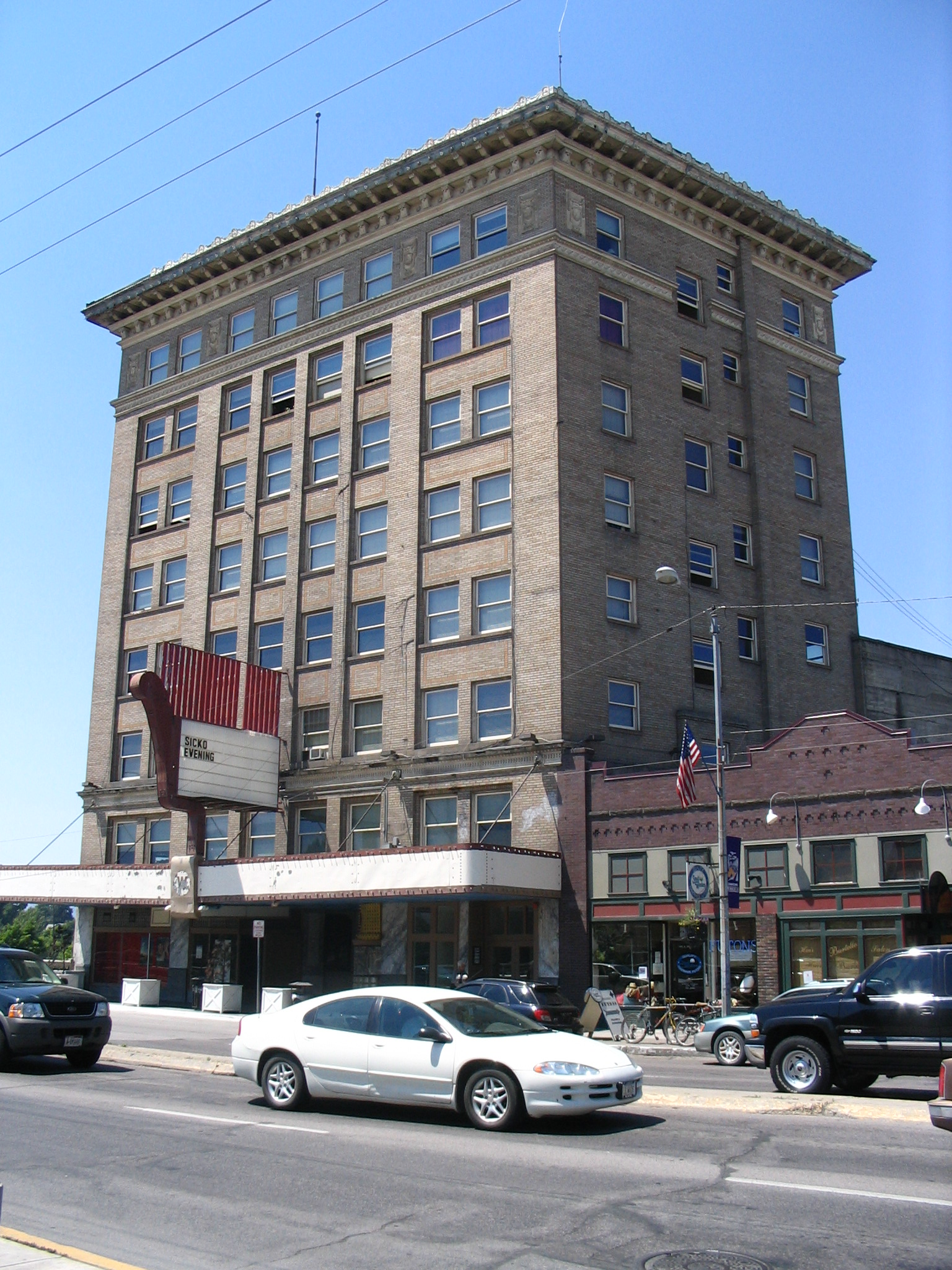
- Front of the theater
- Interactive map of Wilma Theatre
- Address: 131 South Higgins Avenue; Missoula, Montana; United States
- Capacity: 1,400
- Current use: cinema and events venue

Construction
- Opened: 1921

Website
- logjampresents.com/venue/the-wilma/
- Wilma Theatre
- U.S. National Register of Historic Places
- Location within Montana Location within the United States
- Coordinates: 46°52′8″N 113°59′43″W
- Architect: H.E. Kirkemo, Ole Bakke
- Architectural style: Chicago
- NRHP reference No.: 79001407
- Added to NRHP: December 31, 1979

The Wilma Theatre is a cinema and events venue in Missoula, Montana, United States. It was built in 1921 by William "Billy" Simons and dedicated to his wife, light opera artist Edna Wilma. Designed by Norwegian architect Ole Bakke and his assistant H. E. Kirkemo, the steel-framed highrise features hallmarks of Sullivanesque architecture. The theatre is part of an eight-story complex that was the first steel-framed high-rise building in Missoula, and includes the main 1400-seat hall, a lounge, three banquet rooms, a restaurant, apartments and offices. The theatre interior is decorated with Louis XIV Style gilt trim.

The original theatre organ was replaced in the 1950s with a Robert Morton organ from the Orpheum Theater in Spokane, Washington, which had been torn down in 1958.

As originally built, the basement housed a swimming pool, the "Crystal Plunge". Condensation proved incompatible with the structure, and the pool closed within ten years. It now serves as additional storage space.

In 1982 the Cinema of the Dove opened in the basement of the building. It was also known as the Chapel of the Dove. It was operated by Edward Sharp. The Chapel of the Dove was described as a "dazzlingly eclectic space." The Chapel of the Dove was turned into a more conventional theater after Edward Sharp died in 1993.

The theatre shows a diverse range of entertainment, including independent movies, spoken word events, stand-up comedy, live and local music, plays, and other events.

The venue is equipped with a full PA system and stage monitors with Yamaha M7 consoles at the core, as well as a secondary PA for use with the main movie screen. The theatre also employs a full theater lighting system with PAR and Leko fixtures, and six Martin Mac 500 automated moving head fixtures. The lighting is controlled by a Pearl 2000 console.

== Notable events ==
An exclusive preview of Ken Burns's 2023 film "The American Buffalo” was held June 8, 2023.
