= Culture in Missoula, Montana =

The culture of Missoula, Montana is influenced by the nearby University of Montana in art, sports, and music with the city's location in a mountain river valley also encouraging outdoor events and recreation.

== Arts ==
Missoula has a thriving arts scene. The Big Sky Documentary Film Festival, the largest film event in Montana, takes place each February and showcases over 100 non-fiction films from around the world. The International Wildlife Film Festival is held annually at the historic Roxy Theater. The Missoula Children's Theatre is an international touring program that visits nearly 1,000 communities per year. The Children's Theatre routinely has residencies in all fifty states, Canada, Japan, Germany, Italy, and many other countries. The Missoula Art Museum exhibits a variety of contemporary art. The museum was founded in 1975, and in 2005 the facilities were renovated and expanded. The museum offers art classes, tours, gallery talks, and has free admission.

The city is mentioned in novels of Ernest Hemingway, Stephen Frey, Chuck Palahniuk, James Lee Burke, James Crumley, and former resident Norman Maclean. In his novel, A River Runs Through It, Maclean wrote that "[t]he world is full of bastards, the number increasing rapidly the further one gets from Missoula, Montana."

Missoula is home to a diverse music scene. Members of bands such as Deranged Diction (Jeff Ament), which formed in Missoula, later moved to Seattle and became key members of groups such as Green River, Mother Love Bone, Pearl Jam, Silkworm, and Love Battery, playing an important role in the birth of the grunge movement. The city is prominently featured in "Apology Song" by Oregon indie-band The Decemberists. Prior to moving to Portland, The Decemberists frontman Colin Meloy studied at the University of Montana, where he formed a band named Tarkio. Wantage Record hosted Totalfest, a yearly DIY music festival featuring local and touring acts, which ended in 2015 after 14 years, in Missoula.

Ukulele is taught in the public schools.

== Museums and galleries ==
Missoula is home to a variety of museums and galleries with most located in the downtown and university districts.

The Montana Museum of Art & Culture (MMAC), based at the University of Montana and formerly known as the Museum of Fine Arts, is one Montana's oldest cultural reserves with its permanent collection of more than 10,000 original works begun in 1894. MMAC officially became a state museum in 2001 with its mission to "acquire and preserves art that expresses the spirit of the American West and its relationship to the larger world."

Both founded in 1975, the Missoula Art Museum (MAM) and The Historical Museum at Fort Missoula are Missoula's only two museums accredited by the American Alliance of Museums. MAM 's contemporary art collection is housed in a former Carnegie library built by A.J. Gibson in 1903 with a modern-style 2006 addition. Historic Fort Missoula is home to the Historic Museum which collects and preserves artifacts related to the history of Missoula County, Fort Missoula, and timber industry in western Montana. The fort also holds the Rocky Mountain Museum of Military History. and the Northern Rockies Heritage Center

The SpectrUM Discovery Area is a hands-on science discovery center operated by the University of Montana. The Montana Natural History Center is a nature center and museum that features exhibits and an art gallery about the ecosystem and natural history of Western Montana. It is located next to McCormick Park.

The Museum of Mountain Flying, located near the Missoula International Airport, features historic aircraft used in mountain flying and smokejumping, as well as photos and historic memorabilia.

Also related to the region's timber history, in 2009 it was announced that the National Museum of Forest Service History plans to build a National Conservation Legacy and Education Center in Missoula.

In addition to the MAM and MMAC, Missoula is home to an array of other art galleries located downtown. This includes the Monte Dolack Gallery featuring works from Montana artists Monte Dolack and Mary Beth Percival. Monte Dolack in particular often includes local animal species in a whimsical natural or artificial setting. The Murphy-Jubb Fine Art gallery features the watercolor paintings of another University of Montana alumni, Kendal Jan Jubb, in addition to oil paintings of Marshall Noice, and ceramic sculptures of James Hewes. Also located downtown are the Artists' Shop, a cooperative, local artist-run gallery showcasing a wide variety of art and media; the Dana Gallery which represents over forty Montana artists; the photography dedicated Gallery Santonge; Studio D Gallery of M. Scott Miller, and The Brink Gallery which intentionally cannot be narrowly defined.

== Breweries and beer ==

Missoula is home to the oldest and the two largest microbreweries in the state of Montana. Given that it is also the home of the state's largest beer and wine distributor and multiple beer festivals, Missoula easily produces and distributes more beer than anywhere in the state.

Bayern Brewing, Inc. was opened in 1987 by Jürgen Knöller as the "only German Brewery in the Rockies" and is the oldest and second largest brewery in Montana. Their beer is brewed according to Reinheitsgebot, otherwise known as the German Beer Purity Law or the Bavarian Purity Law. Big Sky Brewing opened in 1995 and began as a final project for part-owner Bjorn Nabozney's finance degree at the University of Montana. Four times larger than Bayern and distributed in 24 states, Big Sky is by far Montana's largest brewery. It is also the producer of the best-selling beer in Montana, Moose Drool. Also in 1995, KettleHouse Brewing Company was opened by Tim O'Leary, and though it is much smaller than the two earlier breweries, its proximity to Downtown Missoula and innovative approach to sales has assured it a loyal following. KettleHouse was Missoula's first Brew on Premises, introduced the "growler", and to sell its award-winning product in 16oz cans. Missoula's fourth brewery, Draught Works, was opened in October 2011. Also in 2011, Tamarack Brewing and Flathead Lake Brewing Company from nearby Lake County opened pub houses at Downtown Missoula locations. Additional breweries that opened by 2025 are: Big Sky Brewing Company, Cranky Sam, Gild Brewing, Great Burn Brewing Co., Imagine Nation Brewing Co., Missoula Brewing Co., and Odd Pitch Brewing Co..

The Garden City Brewfest was started in 1993 by four Missoula business owners with the hopes of introducing new microbrews to the Missoula market. Originally called BRIWfest after its original sponsors (Bayern Brewing Co., the Rhinoceros, the Iron Horse, and Worden's Market), the festival was given its present name in 2003 when it was given to the Missoula Downtown Association. The event now draws thousands to Downtown's Caras Park to sample beers from across the region, listen to live music, and sample food from local restaurants. In addition to the Garden City Brewfest, the Montana Brewers Association announced that the 4th Annual Montana Brewers Festival would be held in Missoula.

== Points of interest ==
Missoula is located near the Rattlesnake Wilderness and Rattlesnake National Recreation Area, two areas that protect Missoula's municipal watershed and serve as wildlife habitat and recreational areas. The Forest Service's smokejumper base, the largest of its kind, is located near the Missoula airport. Free tours of the base are undertaken by tourists during the summer wildfire season. A walking bridge over the downtown yards of the Montana Rail Link railroad is a destination for railfans.

In April, 2011, the National Park Service officially recognized the Westside Railroad District, adding it to the National Register of Historic Places. This addition once again expands Missoula's Downtown Historic District, after the February, 2011 addition of Free Speech Corner at Higgens Avenue and West Front Street. Free Speech Corner commemorates the free speech fights of the Industrial Workers of the World, a union formed in 1905 which sought to organize timber, lumber and mining workers into one worldwide union.

== University of Montana ==
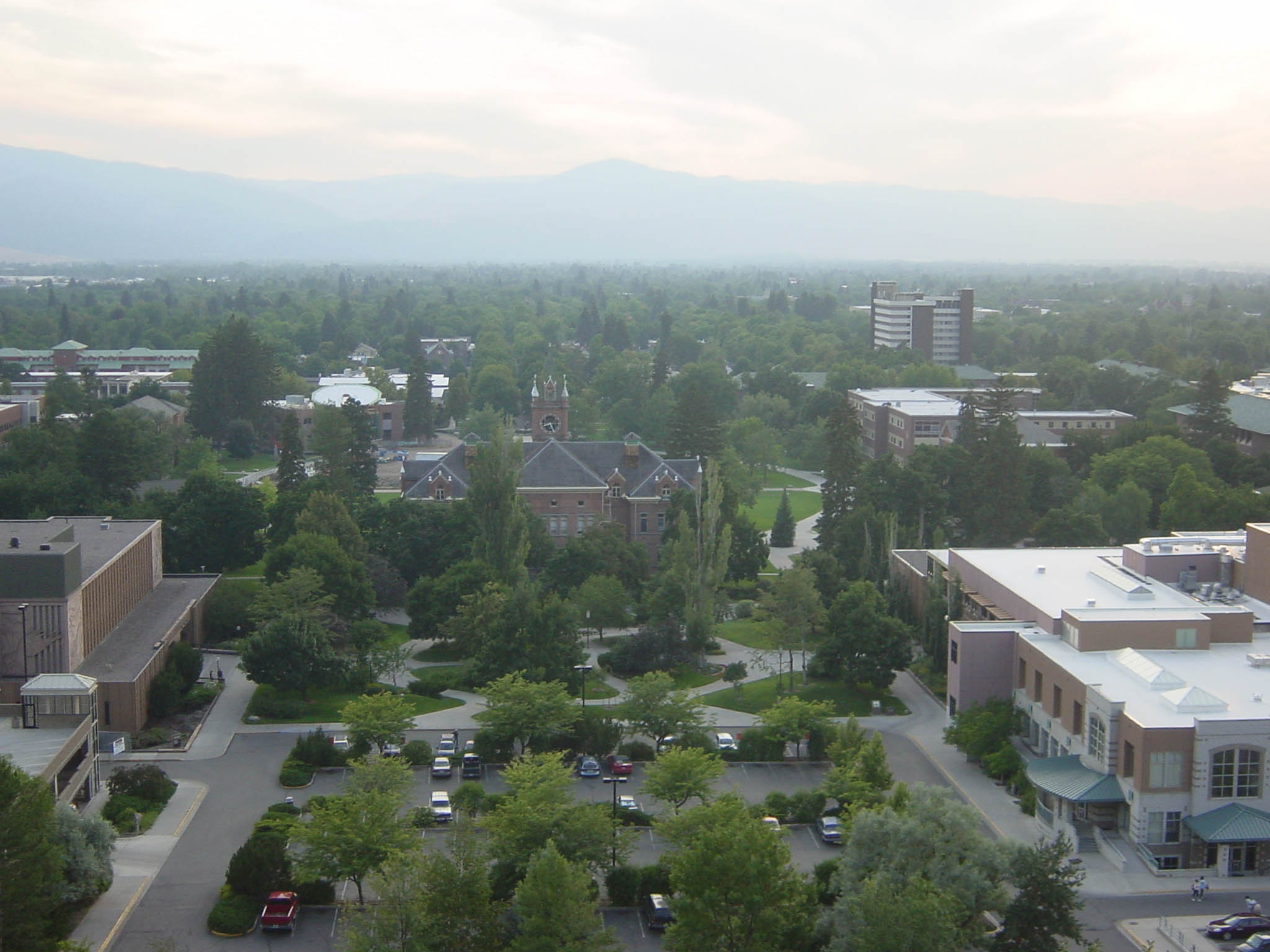
University of Montana from Mt. Sentinel

The University of Montana (UM) is the oldest university in Montana. Established in 1893 and opened in 1895, the Missoula campus has an enrollment of over 15,000. The university campus is the site for numerous public events including athletics, concerts, lectures, and conferences. The university is also the location of the Montana Museum of Art & Culture, the SpectrUM Discovery Area, the state's Regional Federal Depository Library, and houses the State Arboretum. Three other Montana colleges within the Montana University System are administratively affiliated with the University of Montana: University of Montana - Western, Montana Tech, and the two-year University of Montana – Helena College of Technology.

== Sports ==
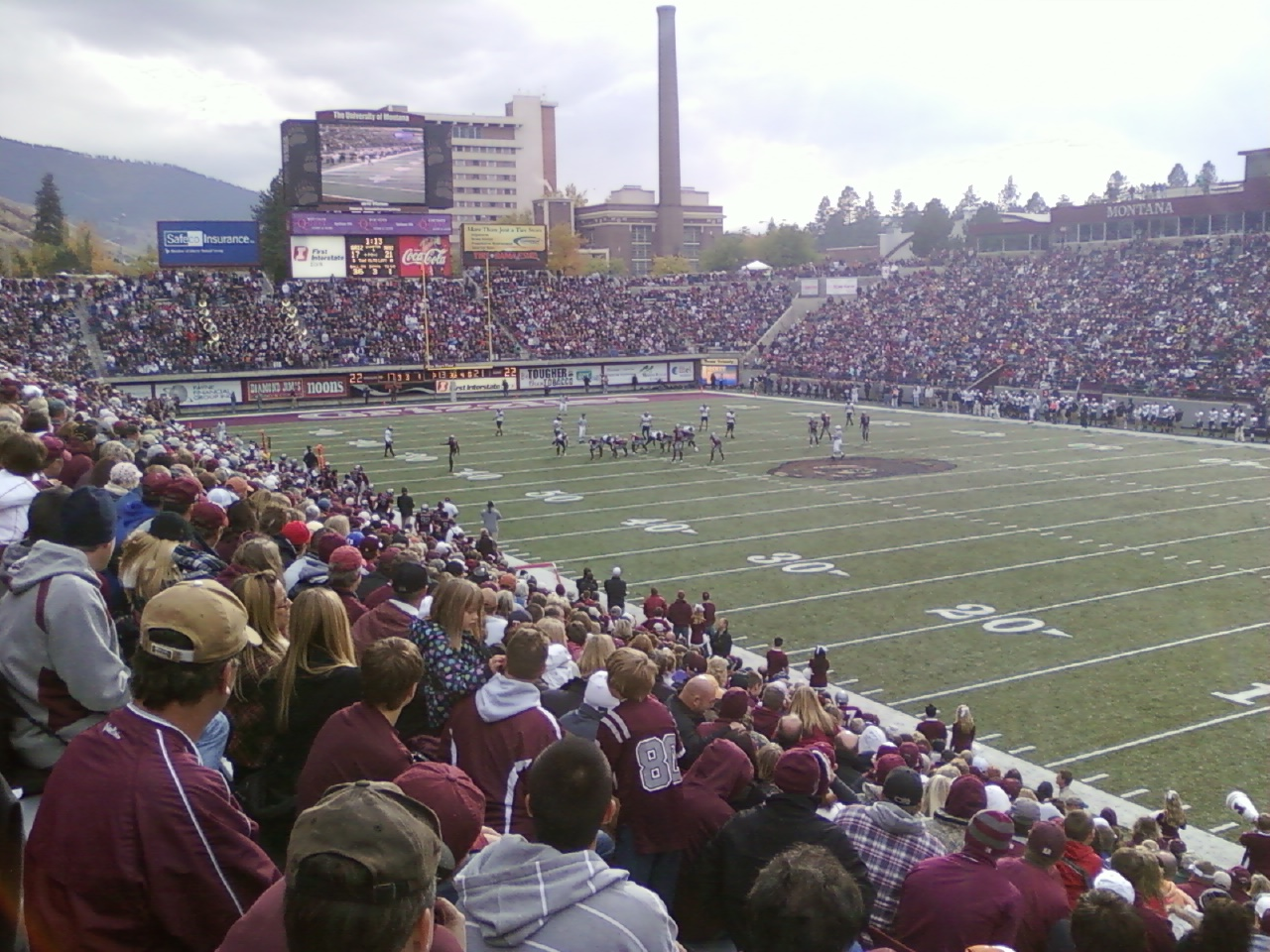
Montana Grizzlies football at Washington–Grizzly Stadium

Missoula plays host to a variety of intercollegiate, youth, and amateur sports organizations in addition to a Minor league baseball team. The Montana Grizzlies' football and basketball teams of the University of Montana have the highest attendance. The Montana Grizzlies football team has a successful program within the NCAA D-1 FCS level. Their home games at Washington–Grizzly Stadium have a near 90% winning percentage and average over 25,000 spectators in attendance. All games are televised throughout Montana. The Grizzlies men's and Lady Griz basketball teams have also been successful at the conference level where they both rank at or near the top in attendance, about 4000 and 3000 respectively, and play their home games at Dahlberg Arena.

Missoula is also home to the Missoula PaddleHeads, an independent baseball team that plays in the Rocky Mountain-based Pioneer Baseball League. They play their home games at Ogren Park at Allegiance Field. The Missoula Maulers were founded in 2007 as a Tier III Junior Ice Hockey. The Maulers play in the newly formed American West Hockey League made up of other Montana and northern Wyoming hockey teams. Also competing regionally are the Hellgate Rollergirls, a roller derby team that competes at the Adam's Center, and the Missoula Phoenix, an AAA semi-pro football team in the Rocky Mountain Football League.

Since 1977, Missoula has also held "Maggotfest," a festival-style rugby tournament hosted by the Missoula All-Maggots Rugby Club the first weekend in May. The non-elimination tournament focuses on the fun aspect of the game, attracting 36 teams (male and female) from around the United States and Canada. In regular season play the Maggots compete as part of the Montana Rugby Union. Also in rugby are the University of Montana Jesters.

== Parks and recreation ==
Missoula's location in a river valley surrounded by mountains on all sides as well as its history has had an influence on the development of the city's parks and recreation activities. Today the city boasts over 400 acres of parkland, 22 miles of trails, and nearly 5000 acres of open-space conservation land. Located at the confluence of three rivers (the Clark Fork, Bitterroot, and Blackfoot), the area is also used for white water rafting and, thanks largely to the novel and subsequent film A River Runs Through It by Missoula-native Norman Maclean, is well known for its fly fishing. Additionally, Missoula has two aquatic parks, multiple golf courses, is home to the Adventure Cycling Association, and hosts what Runner's World called the "best overall" marathon in the nation. With no recreational additions, the nature park has long been considered a wonderful place for birdwatching with over 100 different species that can be frequently sighted from the Bolle Birdwatching trail.

A system of public parks was developed in Missoula in 1902 with the donation of 42 acres along the Rattlesnake Creek for Greenough Park by lumber baron Thomas Greenough and his wife Tessie. They simply asked that "the land forever be used as a park and for park purposes to which the people of Missoula may during the heated days of summer, the beautiful days of autumn, and the balmy days of spring find a comfortable, romantic and poetic retreat" with a follow-up nine years later in a letter to the Missoulian stressing his interest in having the park remain in as close to a native state as possible. Today, that request along with the discovery that non-native Norway Maples were inhibiting the growth of native trees and shrubs such as cottonwoods, ponderosa pines, Rocky Mountain maples led to the controversial decision to remove the invasive tree from the park with the hope of returning it to its natural state.

In 1924, Bonner Park was created out of John L. Bonner's estate near the university. The park today has multiple athletic fields and courts in addition a band shell used by the Missoula City band through the summer. The Kiwanis club set up a park downtown in 1934, making Kiwanis Park the first of a string of parks that today lines both sides of the Clark Fork River. One of those parks on the southern bank of the river is McCormick Park, which was created with WPA funds out of surplus highway land, a parcel from the American Hide and Fur Company, and land donated from its namesake, the Kate McCormick estate. The 26-acre park is home to a skate park, aquatics center, a free bike check-out and a children's fishing pond.

Other parks include the Jacobs Island Bark Park, a designated are for dogs to play off-leash; the Memorial Rose Garden dedicated to Montana's WWII and Vietnam veterans; Waterwise Garden, a "living laboratory" garden utilizing water conservation techniques; and Splash Montana Waterpark at Playfair Park.

=== Caras Park ===
Caras Park, located just south of the historic Wilma Theatre downtown, was created as a result of a land reclamation project done as the state highway department replaced the aging, two-lane Higgins Avenue Bridge in 1962 with the current four-lane structure. Before the reclamation, the Clark Fork River divided to create an island with the north channel's bank extending to nearby buildings such as the Wilma Theatre. The south channel was deepened for the increased water flow and the infilled land later became Caras Park. Events in the park were not common until the early 1980s and permanent fixtures like Out to Lunch that began in 1986. The Missoula Downtown Association took over from Parks and Recreation for management of the park and made improvements to make Caras Park more event friendly. Seating, event circles, brick plazas, restrooms, and storage structures were added. Large temporary tents were used for events until 1997 when a permanent Caras Park Pavilion was constructed. With its centralized, waterfront location the park has become the hub of Missoula's festivities. These include Out to Lunch, the International Wildlife Film Festival, First Night Missoula, Garden City BrewFest and offered intimate concert settings for artists such as Jewel, Chris Isaak, Santana, Ziggy Marley, and B.B. King.

Located next to Caras Park is A Carousel for Missoula, a wooden, hand-carved and volunteer-built carousel; and Dragon Hollow, a magical play land adjacent to the carousel.

== Outdoor activities ==
Missoula is an outdoor enthusiast's paradise throughout the entire year. Throughout the year, activities like alpine and rock climbing, skiing, hiking, biking, golf and fly fishing are available. Missoula is the whitewater rafting and kayaking capitol of Montana because of its proximity to Idaho's crown jewels and multiple year round runs. Missoula is also on the forefront of river surfing, largely due to the man made surf wave in the center of town, Brennan's Wave.

=== Missoula bicycling ===
Missoula is a focal point of bicycle travel, because of the presence of Adventure Cycling Association, North America's largest cycling membership organization. Thousands of cyclists come through Missoula and stop at Adventure Cycling's downtown headquarters (in a former church at 150 E. Pine Street) for free ice cream, advice, and the chance to be photographed. Nonprofit community bicycle shop Freecycles teaches how to build and repair bicycles, and offers rebuilt bicycles. Its location offers "easy access" to the town's bicycle trail system. A Festival of Cycles is held during Walk and Roll Week, Missoula's annual alternative-transportation awareness week.
