= Big Sky Brewing Company =

Regional brewer near Missoula MT

Coordinates: 46.922°N 114.0727°W

- Interactive map of Big Sky Brewing Company
- Location: 5417 Trumpeter Way, Missoula, Montana, USA
- Opened: 1995
- Annual production volume: 40,000–47,000 US beer barrels (47,000–55,000 hL)
- Owned by: Neal Leathers, Bjorn Nabozney, Brad Robinson
- Website: http://www.bigskybrew.com/

Active beers
Name	Type
Moose Drool	Brown ale
Scape Goat	Pale ale
Trout Slayer	American pale wheat ale
Big Sky IPA	India pale ale
Space Goat	Pale ale
Shake-A-Day	India pale ale
Pack Train	Double India Pale Ale
Slow Elk	Oatmeal Stout
Ivan the Terrible	Imperial Stout
Griz Lager	Montana Lager

Seasonal beers
Name	Type
Powder Hound	Winter warmer
Summer Honey	Pale ale
Camp Robber	Coffee Porter
Beire de Noel	Strong Belgian Dark Ale

Big Sky Brewing Company is a brewery and taproom located in Missoula, Montana. It is owned by three partners, Bjorn Nabozney, Neal Leathers, and Brad Robinson. It is Montana's largest brewery. It first opened its doors in 1995 on 120-A Hickory Street, but eventually moved to its current location at 5417 Trumpeter Way. The brewery features both seasonal and regular ales and has continued to function under the same owners for twenty-three years.

== History ==
Big Sky Brewery began when Neal Leathers and Brad Robinson moved to Missoula, Montana from Michigan in 1990. This is where they met their future business partner Bjorn Nabozney, a native Montanan. Brad and Neal began work on starting a brewery. Bjorn created a business plan while studying at the University of Montana for a brewery that put Brad and Neal's idea into perspective. Big Sky Brewing Company was founded shortly after this in 1995.

After raising capital, they purchased their original location at 120 Hickory Street Missoula, Montana, which spanned 7,000 square feet. Big Sky Brewing began brewing beer at their Hickory Street brewery in 1995. Big Sky Brewing's Hickory Street brewery was known as a "draft only" brewery, which means that they did not bottle beer at this establishment. With their eyes set on becoming a regional brewery, Big Sky Brewing planned on bottling beer, the Hickory Street location did not constitute enough room to add bottling production. After an arrangement, Big Sky Brewing began brewing beers at Portland Brewing Company for a few days each month. Portland Brewing also bottled and shipped Big Sky Brewing's beer to distributors. During this arrangement, Big Sky Brewing raised money and worked towards building a new brewery where they could bottle their own beer. Due to this plan they were forced outside of Missoula in 2002 to their current location at 5417 Trumpeter Way, which is over 24,000 square feet. At this new building they bottle and brew their own beer, and their current production rate is around 40,000-47,000 barrels. With their production moving at full speed, they now employ over forty-five full-time employees and sell beer in twenty-four different states. In 2017, Big Sky Brewing lobbied the Montana Legislature, helping pass Montana House Bill 541 allowing breweries to produce 60,000 barrels of beer. Big Sky Brewing also built an amphitheater, where they hold charity events and concerts, in an effort to give back to the Missoula community.

== Awards ==
Beer	Category	Medal	Year	Bestower
406 Series Saison	Strong Belgian Ales	bronze	2010	North American Beer Awards
All Souls Imperail Saison	Other Belgian Style Ales	silver	2013	North American Beer Awards
Barley Wine	Barley Wine-Style Ale	bronze	2001	North American Beer Awards
Barrel Aged Power Wagon	Barrel-Aged Strong Beer	silver	2015	North American Beer Awards
Bière de Noël	Belgian-Style Dark Strong Ale	gold	2006	North American Beer Awards
		gold	2003	North American Beer Awards
Big Sky IPA	English-Style India Pale Ale	silver	2021	North American Beer Awards
Big Sky Irish Stout	Dry Stout	silver	2011	North American Beer Awards
Big Sky Octoberfest	Marzen-Oktoberfest Lager	gold	2021	North American Beer Awards
Bobos Robust Porter	Robust Porter	gold	2010	North American Beer Awards
Bourbon Barleywine	Wood- and Barrel-aged Strong Beer	silver	2005	Festival of Wood and Barrel-Aged Beer
Heavy Horse Scotch Ale	Scotch Export	silver	2005	North American Beer Awards
Ivan the Terrible	Smoke & Wood Flavored Beer	bronze	2025	Montana Beer Awards
Ivan the Terrible - Almond Joy	Vegetable & Spiced Beers	silver	2025	Montana Beer Awards
Ivan the Terrible Imperial Stout	Imperial Stout	gold	2003	Festival of Wood and Barrel-Aged Beer
	Imperial Stout	gold	2016	North American Beer Awards
	Strong Ales	bronze	2024	Montana Brewers Association
Ivan the Terrible Imperial Stout - 2015	Barrel-Aged Strong Beer	bronze	2016	North American Beer Awards
Moose Drool Brown Ale		gold	2003	North American Beer Awards
	Brown Porter	silver	2006	Los Angeles County Fair Competition
	American-Style Brown Ale	gold	2013	North American Beer Awards
	English-Style Brown Ale	silver	2021	North American Beer Awards
	English-Style Brown Ale	silver	2022	North American Beer Awards
POG Seltzer	Alternative Products	gold	2025	Montana Beer Awards
Powder Hound Winter Ale	Old Ale	bronze	2003	North American Beer Awards
		gold	2002	North American Beer Awards
Power Wagon	Other Strong Beer	silver	2013	Great American Beer Festival
	Other Strong Beer	silver	2014	World Beer Cup
Scape Goat Pale	American-Style Pale Ale	gold	1999	North American Beer Awards
Summer Honey Seasonal Ale	Honey Beer	silver	2000	North American Beer Awards
		bronze	2002	North American Beer Awards
		silver	2003	North American Beer Awards
		bronze	2006	North American Beer Awards
	Specialty Honey Beer	gold	2006	Los Angeles County Fair Competition
	Honey Beer	silver	2013	North American Beer Awards
	Honey Beer	bronze	2016	North American Beer Awards
	Honey Beer	gold	2021	North American Beer Awards
Trout Slayer	English-Style Summer Ale	gold	2013	North American Beer Awards

== See also ==
- List of Montana Breweries

Other Breweries in Missoula, Montana

  - Bayern Brewing, Inc.
  - Kettle House Brewing Co.
  - Draught Works

Taprooms only

  - Tamarack Brewing Company
  - Flathead Lake Brewing Co.
  - Portland Brewing Company

== Bibliography ==
Bubnash, Kasey. "Missoula's Brewmasters." Montana Kaiman: The Last Best College News. October 6, 2015. Accessed March 11, 2018. http://www.montanakaimin.com/news/missoula-s-brewmasters/article_60abbcb4-6879-11e5-bc5e-9f85f0262a47.html

D.J. "Interview with Bjorn Nabozney as Big Sky Brewing Launches Griz Montana Lager ." Brew Public . September 14, 2017. Accessed March 11, 2018. https://brewpublic.com/beer-fundraiser/interview-with-bjorn-nabozney-as-big-sky-brewing-launches-griz-montana-lager/

Erickson, David. "UM partners with Big Sky Brewing to sell Griz-branded beer." Missoulian, August 28, 2017. Accessed March 11, 2018. http://missoulian.com/news/local/um-partners-with-big-sky-brewing-to-sell-griz-branded/article_f680978e-e27a-5b88-8929-25ab9a796d24.html.

King, Jon. "Big Sky Brewing, Anheuser-Busch Settle 'Hold My Beer And Watch This' Dispute." Newstalk. January 23, 2014. Accessed March 11, 2018. http://newstalkkgvo.com/big-sky-brewing-anheuser-busch-settle-hold-my-beer-and-watch-this-dispute/.

Newhouse, Ryan. Montana Beer: A Guide to Breweries in Big Sky Country. Charleston, SC: American Palate, 2013.
