= KettleHouse Brewing Company =

Craft brewery in Montana

- Location: Missoula, Montana, U.S.
- Opened: 1996
- Annual production volume: 40,000–47,000 US beer barrels (47,000–55,000 hL)
- Owned by: Tim O'Leary; Suzy Rizza
- Website: www.kettlehouse.com

Active beers
| Name | Type |
| Cold Smoke Scotch Ale | Scotch Ale |
| Eddy Out Pale Ale | Pale ale |
| Double Haul IPA | India pale ale |
| Fresh Bongwater Hemp Pale Ale | Pale ale |
| Bonner Lager | Lager |

Seasonal beers
| Name | Type |
| Garden City Pale Ale | Pale ale |
| Ginseng Pale Ale | Pale ale |
| Brick & Mortar | Strong Belgian Dark Ale |

KettleHouse Brewing Company is a craft brewing company located in Missoula, Montana. Founded in 1995 by Tim O'Leary and Suzy Rizza, the company has grown from a single taproom to two taprooms in Missoula and a major production facility in Bonner, Montana on the Blackfoot River. In 2017, the company, in collaboration with Top Hat Entertainment, opened the KettleHouse Amphitheater near the new facility in Bonner.

== History ==
Founders Tim O'Leary and Suzy Rizza discovered a growing community of craft brewers while living in Colorado in the 1990s and began brewing beer. After experimenting with homebrewing in their kitchen, they quickly moved their production to a brew-on-premises in Boulder. The couple moved to Montana and opened the first brew on premise in Missoula, with the state only requiring them to obtain a brewer's license. They established KettleHouse with the idea of beer and recyclable packaging as a guiding point for success.

In 2006, KettleHouse became the first brewer in Montana to can its beer, fulfilling O'Leary's original goal of an environmentally friendly brewhouse. After occupying its original Myrtle Street location since opening, the canning required a move to a bigger facility to accommodate higher production numbers and larger equipment. Moving into a Northside location in 2009, the company did not think they would reach the production limit as laid out by the state of Montana. Despite two facilities working at full production, the company could not meet demand for their product and still remain under the 10,000 barrel cap. Starting in 2012, the company began to move out of markets in response to the demand in the Missoula area. O'Leary stated he was unwilling to "close down our taprooms and risk alienating ourselves from our core market", but that he hoped he could help "remove this 10K (barrel) hurdle", (something he had helped put in place in 1999) and increase the barrel limit. In 2017, the increase in barrel production limits O'Leary sought was passed in the Montana State Legislature. Production limits were raised to 60,000 barrels with a 2,000 barrel limit on taproom sales for breweries in Montana.

In 2017, KettleHouse expanded outside beer production and its related products for the first time. In January 2017, the company opened a brand new canning and brewing facility in Bonner to prepare for the increase in barrels allowed as passed in the legislature. The new facility has the ability to brew 30,000 barrels per year, surpassing the production of both other taprooms. In the summer of 2017, KettleHouse opened the new KettleHouse Amphitheater in Bonner, Montana with inaugural act Lyle Lovett.

== Products ==
KettleHouse has four mainstay beers available at its tap houses: Cold Smoke Scotch Ale, Double Haul IPA, Eddy Out Pale Ale and Fresh Bongwater Hemp Ale. Cold Smoke is KettleHouse's best seller and most awarded beer with four Golds at the North American Beer Awards as well as a popular ice cream version served in Missoula. Bongwater Hemp Ale attracted some controversy with its initial offering that culminated with an investigation by the Bureau of Alcohol, Tobacco, Firearms and Explosives.

=== Seasonals ===
In addition to its mainstays, the brewery offers a rotating selection of seasonals that differ based on the tap house and the time of year. Some of the more popular offerings are the Garden City Pale Ale and the various cask aged beers released throughout the year. Included at the tap houses are nitro-served beers, with Cold Smoke on nitro being a popular choice by consumers as it creates a smoother drink. Te Bonner Lager, a beer designed to be consumed at the KettleHouse Amphitheater was brewed to celebrate the venue's opening in 2017.

== Awards ==
| Beer | Category | Medal | Year | Bestower |
|---|---|---|---|---|
| 56 Counties | American & International Pale Lagers | silver | 2025 | Montana Beer Awards |
| Barrel Aged Freezout Stout | Smoke and Wood Flavored Beer | bronze | 2024 | Montana Brewers Association |
| Barrel Aged Sapped Out Maple Stout | Wood Flavored Beer | silver | 2011 | North American Beer Awards |
| Biere de Garde | Biere de Garde | gold | 2015 | North American Beer Awards |
| Blueberry Pomegranate Seltzer | Alternative Products | silver | 2025 | Montana Beer Awards |
| Brick and Mortar Porter | Belgian-Style Dark Strong Ale | silver | 2012 | North American Beer Awards |
| Cold Smoke Scotch Ale | Scottish Style Ale | bronze | 2009 | Great American Beer Festival |
| | Scottish Ales | silver | 2010 | North American Beer Awards |
| | Scotch Ale | gold | 2011 | North American Beer Awards |
| | Scottish Export | bronze | 2011 | North American Beer Awards |
| | Scotch Ale | bronze | 2012 | World Beer Cup |
| | Scottish-Style Ale | silver | 2015 | Great American Beer Festival |
| | Scottish-Style Export | gold | 2016 | North American Beer Awards |
| | Scotch Ale (Wee Heavy) | bronze | 2021 | North American Beer Awards |
| | Scottish-Style Ale Scottish-Style Export | gold | 2022 | North American Beer Awards |
| Double Haul IPA | English-Style India Pale Ale | gold | 2014 | World Beer Cup |
| Double Haul North | English-Style India Pale Ale | gold | 2012 | North American Beer Awards |
| Double Haul South | English-Style Pale Ale | bronze | 2012 | North American Beer Awards |
| Fresh Bongwater | English-Style Summber Ale | silver | 2015 | North American Beer Awards |
| Gin Eddy | Barrel-Aged Beer | silver | 2013 | North American Beer Awards |
| Ginseng Ginger Ale | Carbonated Soft Drinks | silver | 2012 | North American Beer Awards |
| Haulapeno | Chili Beer | gold | 2016 | North American Beer Awards |
| Hellgate Honey Hefe | American-Style Hefeweizen | silver | 2021 | North American Beer Awards |
| KettleHouse Kommon | California Common | silver | 2015 | North American Beer Awards |
| Kombrewski | Specialty and Experimental Beer | silver | 2016 | North American Beer Awards |
| Muley Buck IPA | India Pale Ales | silver | 2024 | Montana Brewers Association |
| | Pale Ales | silver | 2025 | Montana Beer Awards |
| Seeley Axe White | Gluten-Free Beer | bronze | 2011 | Great American Beer Festival |
| Shady New England IPA | Hazy Pale Ales | gold | 2024 | Montana Brewers Association |
| Zula Stout | American Stout | silver | 2011 | North American Beer Awards |

== See also ==
- List of breweries in Montana

== Bibliography ==
- Cederberg, Jenna."Local demand forces Kettlehouse to remove products from Kalispell…" The Missoulian, Mar 4, 2012. http://missoulian.com/news/local/local-demand-forces-kettlehouse-to-remove-products-from-kalispell-helena/article_d565bb08-64f0-11e1-88c3-001871e3ce6c.html
- Eaton, Joe. "Missoula Taps the Power of Beer."City Lab, Aug 3, 2017. https://www.citylab.com/life/2017/08/missoula-taps-the-power-of-beer/535800/
- Moore, Michael. Olde Bongwater has State Crime Lab all abuzz." The Missoulian, Dec 12, 1999. http://missoulian.com/uncategorized/olde-bongwater-beer-has-state-crime-lab-all-abuzz/article_988667de-1fa0-568d-9b85-8cefb561946f.html
- Newhouse, Ryan. Montana Beer: A Guide to Breweries in Big Sky Country. Charleston, SC: American Palate, 2013.
- Nickell, Joe. "Kettlehouse, Big Dipper Team Up to Make Coldsmoke Beer Ice Cream." The Missoulian, Sept,17 2009. http://missoulian.com.weblib.lib.umt.edu:8080/news/local/kettlehouse-big-dipper-team-up-to-create-cold-smoke-beer/article_2112e0e4-a40f-11de-9713-001cc4c002e0.html
- Tabish, Dillion.,"Legislature Approves Bill Raising Brewery Production Limits," Flathead Beacon, Apr 13, 2017. http://flatheadbeacon.com/2017/04/13/legislature-approves-bill-raising-brewery-production-limits/
