= Bayern Brewing =

Oldest brewery in the U.S. state of Montana

Bayern Brewing, Inc.
- Location: 1507 Montana St., Missoula, Montana, United States Missoula, Montana
- Opened: 1987
- Annual production volume: 10,000
- Owned by: Jürgen Knöller
- Website: https://www.bayernbrewery.com/

Active beers
Name	Type
Bayern Amber	Lager
Bayern Pilsner	Lager
Montana Lager	Lager
Dragon's Breath	Lager
Inconceivable	Lager

Seasonal beers
Name	Type
St. Wilbur Weizen	Lager
Oktoberfest	Lager
Killarney	Lager
Maibock	Lager
Groomer	Lager
Face Plant	Lager
Dump Truck	Lager
Dump Truck Citra Charged	Lager
Doppelbock	Lager
Dancing Trout	Lager

Inactive beers
Name	Type
30th Anniversary Celebration Pilsner	Lager

Bayern Brewing, Inc. is located in Missoula, Montana, United States, and is the oldest brewery in the state. It was founded in 1987 by Trudy, Reinhard Schultz, and Donald Gamer. It is named after Bayern, the state located in the southeastern half of Germany. The brewery is focused on German food and beer and tries to implement environmentally friendly policies.

== History ==
=== Founding 1987-2002 ===
Trudy Schulte, one of the original owners, came from a brewing dynasty in Bavaria and grew up in German brewing culture. The Schultes immigrated to Missoula from Bavaria and opened their bar, restaurant, and brewery on leased property soon after. Ironically, despite being in the same building and separated by a single door, Bayern was forced to go through a distributor to transport their beer from the brewery to their bar and restaurant combo due to Montana state law at the time. According to Montana state law, the brewery could also not be an official brewpub, as those were not legal to operate within the state at the time. During the first several years of operation, supplies, especially yeast, were difficult to come by. However, the euro was at a lower value than the dollar, making German equipment more accessible and cheaper than American machinery, despite its high quality. Then, in 1991, after the fall of the Berlin Wall and the reunification of Germany, the Schultes decided to sell their American dream and move back to their homeland, investing instead in former Soviet-occupied East Germany. At this point, Jürgen Knöller, a fellow Bavarian and the Master Brewer of Bayern Brewing, stepped in and purchased the brewery.

Knöller has been the primary owner of Bayern Brewing since he purchased Bayern Brewing in 1991. His interest in brewing began when he was a teenager in Bavaria, Germany. Since the original owners and Knöller were raised in Bavaria, Germany, the brewery's name stems from their home, as Germans call Bavaria Bayern. Knöller graduated from Doemens' Masterschool for Brewing and Soft Drink Technology in Munich, after nine years of professional training. After he graduated in 1987, he was hired as the Master Brewer in the newly founded Bayern Brewing in Missoula, Montana. Knöller bought out the original owners in 1991 and has been running and operating Bayern Brewing ever since. Bayern practices “Reinheitsgebot” or “the Bavarian Purity Law” which states that only water, hops, grain, and yeast may be used to brew beer and additives like fruits are to be left out.

=== Expansion ===
Knöller went on and hired the current master brewer, Thorsten Geuer. In 2002, after his years as an apprentice at the Hasbro Früh brewery in Cologne, Germany, his internship at Bayern, and finally his formal study at Berlin's brewing college, VLB Berlin, where Thorsten received his bachelor's degree.

Bayern Brewing has been situated in three distinct locations across Missoula, Montana throughout its history, and has moved twice to better accommodate its growing business. Initially, the brewery was located near the train depot in downtown Missoula, specifically on N. Higgins. Subsequently, Bayern Brewing developed a plant on 2600 S. Third St. W., and later expanded further to its current location at 1507 Montana St.

Previously, Montana state law capped craft brewery production at 10,000 barrels. Bayern had to continue growing without producing more than the 10,000 barrel limit. However, with the passing of House Bill 541 in 2017, production limits were raised to 60,000 barrels, giving Bayern room to expand further. House Bill 541 was officially passed and signed in the Edelweiss Bistro by Governor Steve Bullock. In 2017, Bayern began canning their beer for the first time and introduced a 32-ounce “crowler” can.

Throughout its history, Bayern has remained committed to being a community-oriented business, commissioning local artist Monte Dolack to design some of its labels that include depictions of local wildlife and landscapes. Dolack is responsible for designing most of the labels and advertisements for the beers produced and served at Bayern Brewing. He has designed the labels of some of the breweries' most notable brands: Doppel Bock, Pilsner, Dancing Trout, Maibock, and Oktoberfest.

=== Edelweiss Bistro ===
In 2015, Bayern Brewing opened Edelweiss Bistro to generate more revenue. The bistro serves a variety of authentic German food, which is fresh and reflective of its Bavarian roots. Customers can choose a large variety of options, including käsespatzle, curry wurst, schnitzel, and sauerkraut. Keeping with their tradition of sustainability, Knöller sources his pork from a local and humane provider, and purchases high-quality food.

=== Sustainability ===
Knöller has made efforts to improve the sustainability of Bayern Brewing. The company has been recycling their glass bottles since 2010, and they have developed cardboard “eco-packs” as a way to motivate its customers to return glass bottles to Bayern. If customers bring in their eco-packs, which are reused and recycled, they are given a 5 cent discount on every bottle that they return. The eco-packs have a one-time deposit of 3 dollars, and the customer can keep reusing those eco-packs and receive discounts from Bayern Brewing. There are specific requirements for the bottles that Bayern Brewing can use, but all of the requirements are listed on the eco pack. Knöller invested in a custom-made bottle washing machine for Bayern Brewing in order to make their glass recycling process possible. According to Master Brewer, Geuer, “between 30 and 60 percent” of the glass they use is recycled. Bayern also donates its brewing waste to local farmers to feed cattle and other animals.

In 2007 Bayern began to phase out the name "Trout Slayer" for one of its best-selling beers. For much of the beer's history, it was known simply as "Light Wheat Ale" until it leased the name "Trout Slayer.” Kalispell businessman Brian Beck later trademarked it. Knöller did not want to continue to pay high licensing fees, and he wanted to rename the beer to reflect Bayern's more eco-friendly policies. In 2007, Knöller wanted to name the beer “Dancing Trout” for the beer to reflect Knöller's philosophy of environmental preservation. The new Dancing Trout also became the Official Beer Sponsor of Montana's Trout Unlimited with a portion of its sales' profit donated to help preserve trout and their habitat. A new Trout Slayer Ale with a different recipe was released by Big Sky Brewing Co. later that year.

== Products ==
Knöller imports hops specific to Germany, and many of his beers adhere to the set standards of various German institutions. Bayern produces many different beers specific to Germany, and they are produced in German fashion. They produce a Pilsner, a Doppel Weizen, Hefeweizen, Dark Marzen, and others.

== Awards ==
Beer	Category	Medal/Award	Year	Bestower
Bakken Bock	German Bock	silver	2019	US Open Beer Championship
Dark Doppelbock	German-Style Strong Doppelbock	gold	1999	North American Beer Awards
Doppelbock	German-Style Strong Doppelbock	silver	2001	North American Beer Awards
	Doppelbock	gold	2012	North American Beer Awards
	Doppelbock	bronze	2010	North American Beer Awards
	Dopple/Strong Bock	gold	2015	US Open Beer Championship
	Dopple/Strong Bock	bronze	2020	US Open Beer Championship
Dragon's Breath Dark Heff	South German-Style Dunkel Weizen/Weissbier	silver	2010	US Open Beer Championship
		Judges Award	2010	US Open Beer Championship
	German Wheat	silver	2012	US Open Beer Championship
Dump Truck	German-Style Heller Bock/Maibock	bronze	2010	US Open Beer Championship
Eisbock	Strong Lager	gold	2024	Montana Brewers Association
	Strong Lagers	gold	2025	Montana Beer Awards
Face Plant	German Wheat	bronze	2012	US Open Beer Championship
	German Wheat	bronze	2014	US Open Beer Championship
	German Wheat	bronze	2016	US Open Beer Championship
	German Wheat	gold	2017	US Open Beer Championship
	Belgian-Style Wit (White), Kristall Weizen, DunkelweizenWeizen Bock	bronze	2022	North American Beer Awards
Maibock	German-Style Heller Bock/Maibock	silver	2000	North American Beer Awards
	German-Style Heller Bock/Maibock	silver	2003	North American Beer Awards
	Bock	gold	2012	US Open Beer Championship
	Bock	silver	2013	US Open Beer Championship
Montana Helles Lager	Helles Lager	bronze	2015	North American Beer Awards
	Munchner Helles	bronze	2013	US Open Beer Championships
	Helles Lager	silver	2013	North American Beer Awards
Pilsner	German Lager/Pilsener	bronze	2012	US Open Beer Championship
Schwarzbier	German-Style Schwarzbier	silver	1999	North American Beer Awards
	Schwarzbier	bronze	2015	US Open Beer Championship
St. Walter Hefeweizen	German Style Hefeweizen	bronze	2022	World Beer Cup
	Bavarian-Style Hefeweizen	gold	2022	North American Beer Awards
	Wheat Ale	gold	2024	Montana Brewers Association
	Wheat Ales	silver	2025	Montana Beer Awards

== See also ==
- List of microbreweries
- List of Montana Breweries

Other breweries in Missoula, Montana

- Big Sky Brewing Company
- Kettle House Brewing Co.
- Draught Works

Taprooms only

- Tamarack Brewing Company
- Flathead Lake Brewing Co.
