= Stephen Frey =

American novelist

Stephen Frey is a best-selling author who writes novels set in the financial world. He is a managing director at a private equity firm, and lives in Florida. He previously worked in mergers and acquisitions at JP Morgan and as a vice president of corporate finance at an international bank headquartered in Manhattan.

Until the publication of The Chairman, introducing the character of Christian Gillette, Frey's books were all standalone stories. Beginning with The Chairman, Frey published four books about Gillette and his association with the private equity firm of Everest Capital. The Fourth Order, is a departure with a story line taking on the timely issue of domestic spying, although it is set in the world of high finance like his previous works.

His books, published mostly by the major trade publisher Dutton, are found in thousands of US libraries, according to OCLC.

== Bibliography ==
- The Takeover (1995)
- The Vulture Fund (1996)
- The Inner Sanctum (1997)
- The Legacy (1998)
- The Insider (1999)
- Trust Fund (2001)
- The Day Trader (2002)
- Silent Partner (2003)
- Shadow Account (2004)
- The Chairman (2005) Christian Gillette Book 1
- The Protégé (2005) Christian Gillette Book 2
- The Power Broker (2006) Christian Gillette Book 3
- The Successor (2007) Christian Gillette Book 4
- The Fourth Order (2007)
- Forced Out (2008)
- Hell's Gate (2009)
- Heaven's Fury (2010)
- Arctic Fire (2012) Red Cell series vol. 1
- Red Cell 7 (2014) Red Cell series vol. 2
- Kodiak Sky (September 2014) Red Cell series vol. 3
- Jury Town (2017)
- Ultimate Power (2018)
