= Missoula Downtown Historic District =

Historic district in Montana, United States

- U.S. National Register of Historic Places
- U.S. Historic district
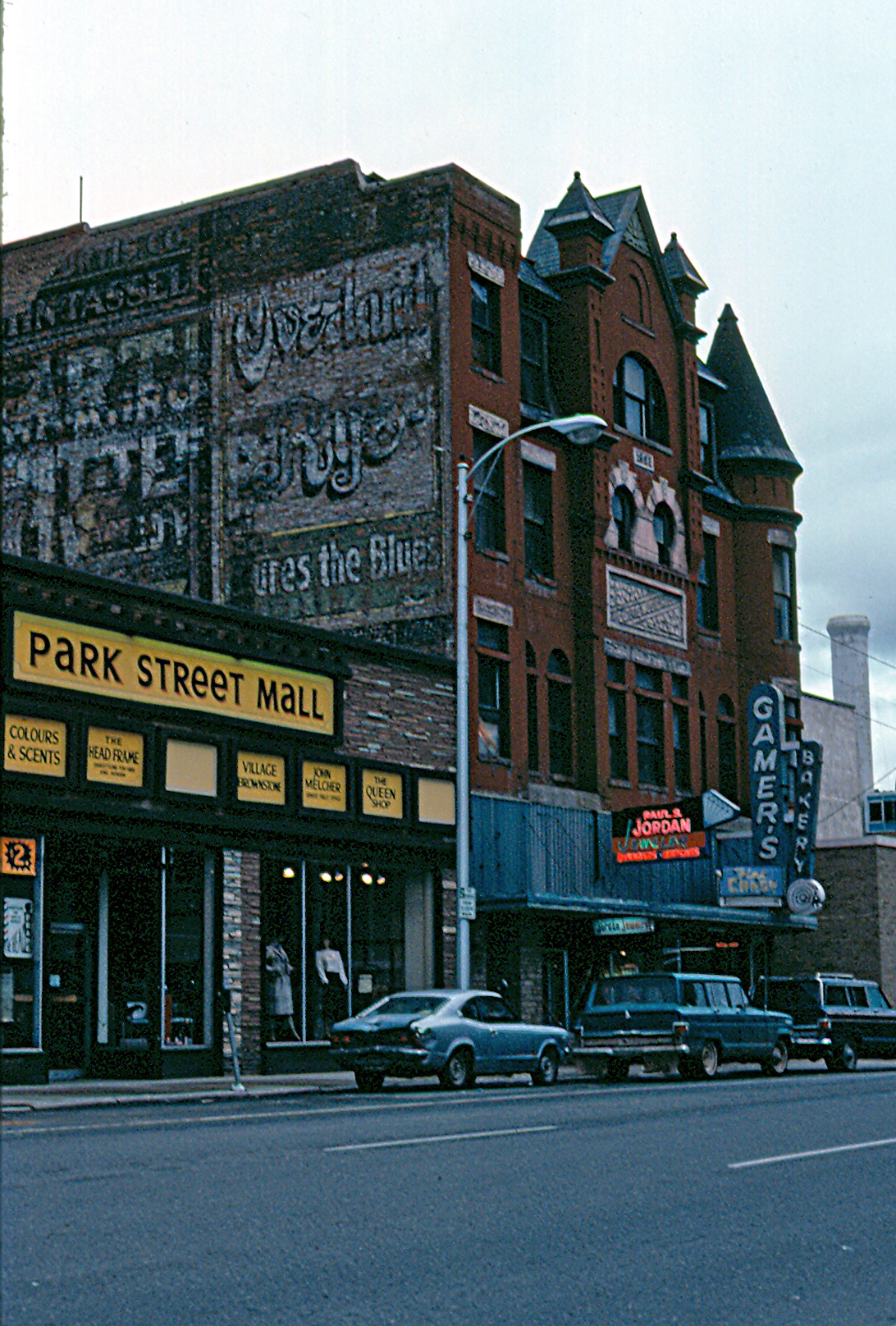

- Location within Montana Location within the United States
- Location: Roughly bounded by the former Northern Pacific railroad tracks, the Clark Fork River, Little McCormick Park, and Madison St. Boundary increase/decrease (listed February 7, 2011): Higgins Ave. & Front St. Boundary increase (listed April 8, 2011): Bounded by Montana Rail Link and BNSF Railway, Toole-Railroad-Alder Sts., Missoula, Montana
- Coordinates: 46.87°N 113.986944°W
- Area: 203 acres (82 ha)
- Built: 1883
- Built by: multiple
- Architect: multiple
- Architectural style: Late 19th And 20th Century Revivals, Late 19th And Early 20th Century American Movements, et al.
- MPS: Missoula MPS
- NRHP reference No.: 07000647
- Added to NRHP: August 21, 2009

Missoula Downtown Historic District in Missoula, Montana is a 203 acres (82 ha) historic district which was listed on the National Register of Historic Places in 2009. Its boundaries were changed in two revision listings in 2011.

Its original listing included 376 contributing buildings and four contributing sites.
