= SpectrUM Discovery Area =

spectrUM Discovery Area
- Established: October 2007
- Location: Missoula, Montana
- Type: Science Museum
- Website: spectrUM website

The spectrUM Discovery Area is a free science museum that is open to the public. It is located in the Missoula Public Library at 455 East Main Street in Missoula, Montana.

Founded in 2007 by medicinal chemist Dr. Charles Thompson, spectrUM is dedicated to teaching science through hands-on exhibits, award-winning science education programs and activities which engage about 200,000 each year. It also offers summer camps, birthday parties, no-school camps, and after-school clubs.

As part of the Broader Impacts Group at the University of Montana, spectrUM connects Montana's next generation to opportunities in STEM and higher education.

spectrUM's national sponsors and community partners include the National Science Foundation EPSCoR Program, the Institute of Museum and Library Services, the National Informal STEM Education (NISE) Network, and SciGirls.

In Montana, it is supported by the O.P. and W.E. Edwards Foundation, the Jane S. Heman Foundation, and the tireless individuals and businesses who support STEM and education in surrounding communities.
