= Hellgate Roller Derby =

Roller derby team

- Metro area: Missoula, Montana
- Country: United States
- Founded: 2009
- Track type(s): Flat
- Venue: The Furnace
- Org. type: non-profit
- Website: http://hellgaterollerderby.org/

Hellgate Roller Derby (HRD) formerly known as the Hellgate Rollergirls (HGRG) is a skater-run, non-profit organization designed exclusively for the purpose of promoting the sport of flat track roller derby in Missoula, Montana. HRD always welcomes new skaters of all genders, body types and athletic abilities. The board of directors (BOD), all committee heads, members, and all skaters are volunteers.

The team was founded in 2009, and initial public meetings drew great interest. Over 80 attended a September 2009 meeting. They began playing bouts in mid-2010. Their first event was an exhibition held in August 2010. League colors: red and black. Hellgate Roller Derby also has two junior leagues, the Hellgate Hellions, ages 12-17 and the Lil' Devils, ages 6-11.

== Mission ==
The members of HRD are athletes who train to the fullest of their individual abilities, respect their teammates and competitors, and love the sport of roller derby. Their goal is to promote strength and self-esteem and to encourage camaraderie and teamwork among all members. They embrace members of all shapes, sizes, backgrounds, and skill levels. Their skaters work to increase their skills through discipline, hard work, and focus.

Hellgate Roller Derby is proud to carry on the tradition of roller derby and strives to create a physically demanding sport that inspires members of all ages to embrace their inner strength, self-confidence, and competitiveness while entertaining our fans. Hellgate Roller Derby members are also encouraged to donate their time and/or money to local communities and other nonprofits.

== Hiatus ==
March 2020 Hellgate Roller Derby went on a hiatus due to Covid, and losing their practice space. They were able to get back to action and return September 2021 to their new space. Although the space is not big enough to scrimmage in, they still hold practices, run clinics and public skates to raise funds. They are actively searching for a space large enough to rent out a couple times a month to hold scrimmages in.

== See also ==
- Missoula PaddleHeads
