= List of breweries in Montana =

Breweries in Montana produce a wide range of beers in different styles that are marketed locally, regionally, and nationally. Montana has an abundance of small, local breweries. In 2024, they ranked third in the number of craft breweries per capita of adults over 21. They have ranked third for over a decade. In addition to craft beer, Montana has several small batch distilleries, wineries, and ciderhouses. They also produce mead, kombucha, and seltzers.

In 2019, excluding the two largest breweries, the remaining 90 breweries produced an average of 1,650 barrels per year. In 2022, there were a total of 196,941 barrels of craft beer produced. The amount decreased to 182,488 in 2024.

In 2012 Montana's 38 brewing establishments (including breweries, brewpubs, importers, and company-owned packagers and wholesalers) employed 220 people directly, and more than 4,700 others in related jobs such as wholesaling and retailing. In August 2016, there were 68 breweries in operation in the state of Montana. In November 2023, the Montana Brewers Association reported 97 breweries with 4 more known to be in planning. In 2024 there were 109 breweries.

Including people directly employed in brewing, as well as those who supply Montana's breweries with everything from ingredients to machinery, the total business and personal tax revenue generated by Montana's breweries and related industries was more than $98 million in 2012. Consumer purchases of Montana's brewery products generated more than $21 million extra in tax revenue. The Brewers Association reported that Montana breweries had a $488 million impact in 2022. That increased to $565 million in 2024.

== History ==
- 1863 - "Gilbert Brewery" was founded by Henry Gilbert, Christian Ritcher, and William Smith, making it one of the Montana Territory's first breweries, though it was not the first. Originally called "Thorn-Smith Brewery" and then "Virginia Brewery", the brewery continued until Montana Prohibition laws went into effect around 1916–1918. The brewery re-opened in 1934 but closed for good in 1974.
- 1926 - Montana became the first state to repeal Prohibition enforcement. The petition to lift the ban stated its purpose was "to restore constitutional rights and liberty in the state of Montana by repealing all laws relative to prohibition except those relating to minors." Efforts to reinstate the law two years later in 1928 failed.
- 1997 - The cabaret license was created as a reaction to the fast-rising prices of regular liquor licenses. Cabaret licenses are more affordable and allowed restaurant owners to sell wine and beer.

== List ==
=== 1889 Brewing Co. ===
Owned by Matt and Lindsey Miller, this Billings brewery opened in December 2024. They brew more than 15 beers. Their Winter Sippa Porter won bronze in the Strong Ales category at the 2025 Montana Beer Awards.

=== 1Ō5 Brewing ===
This brewery serves both coffee and beer in the Billings Heights neighborhood. Travis Zeilstra, with previous experience at four other breweries and multiple awards, is the head brewer. It opened in January 2025 and has the capacity to brew 10 beers.

=== 2 Basset Brewery ===
This brewery in White Sulphur Springs is owned by Barry Hedrich. He opened the brewery in February 2016. They produce a variety of beer as well as seltzer. Their Woofta won the 2024 silver award for Strong Lagers from Montana Brewers Association.

=== 406 Brewing Company ===
406 Brewing Company is a microbrewery and tasting room in Manhattan. The owner is Matt Muth, a home brewer since college. The brewery opened in 2011, as the second brewery within Bozeman's city limits. In 2024, the brewery moved to a larger location in Manhattan. The name is derived from Montana's Telephone Area Code, which is 406.

At the 2016 North American Beer Awards, their Belgian pale took gold in the Belgian-Style Pale Ale category. In 2018, their Run-off Brown won silver at the North American Beer Awards in the English-Style Brown Ale category. At the 2024 North American Beer Awards they had three beers place: J.A.M.ber Ale won gold in Brown Porter, Belgian Pale Ale won silver in Belgian-Style Pale Ale, Peach Wheat won bronze in Other Fruit Beers.

They were the winners of the Community Impact Award at the 2025 Montana Beer Awards. Their Red Barrel won silver in the Strong Ales category and Little Blonde won bronze in Golden Ales and Hybrid Styles. At the North American Beer Awards they won silver with both their Belgian Pale Ale and Guava Tangerine Gose.

=== Angry Hank's Microbrewery ===
Angry Hank's Brewing was opened in 2006 by Tim Mohr, who had worked as a brewer at Red Lodge Ales for five years. The brewery was originally housed in an old gas station. In 2012, a second location was opened eight blocks away in an old carriage house. The brewery moved all operations to the carriage house in 2014. They also began canning their signature Street Fight and Anger Management.

The Angry Hank from which the brewery gets its name is not part of the organization, but instead a friend of the family who always seemed angry. The idea for the name came when someone, in an attempt to console Hank said to him, "Don't be angry Hank," just as Mohr and his family were having troubles deciding on a name for the then-proposed establishment.

==== Awards ====
Beer	Category	Medal	Year	Bestower
Frost killer	Scottish-Style Export	Silver	2015	North American Beer Awards
Münchner Helles	Münchner-Style Helles	Gold	2011	Great American Beer Festival

=== Annie's Tap House ===
Annie's Tap House is a brewery in downtown Great Falls. It was opened in 2022 by brothers Dan and Steve Morano as well as Kevin Younkin. The name is from the brothers' great-grandmother.

=== Backslope Brewing ===
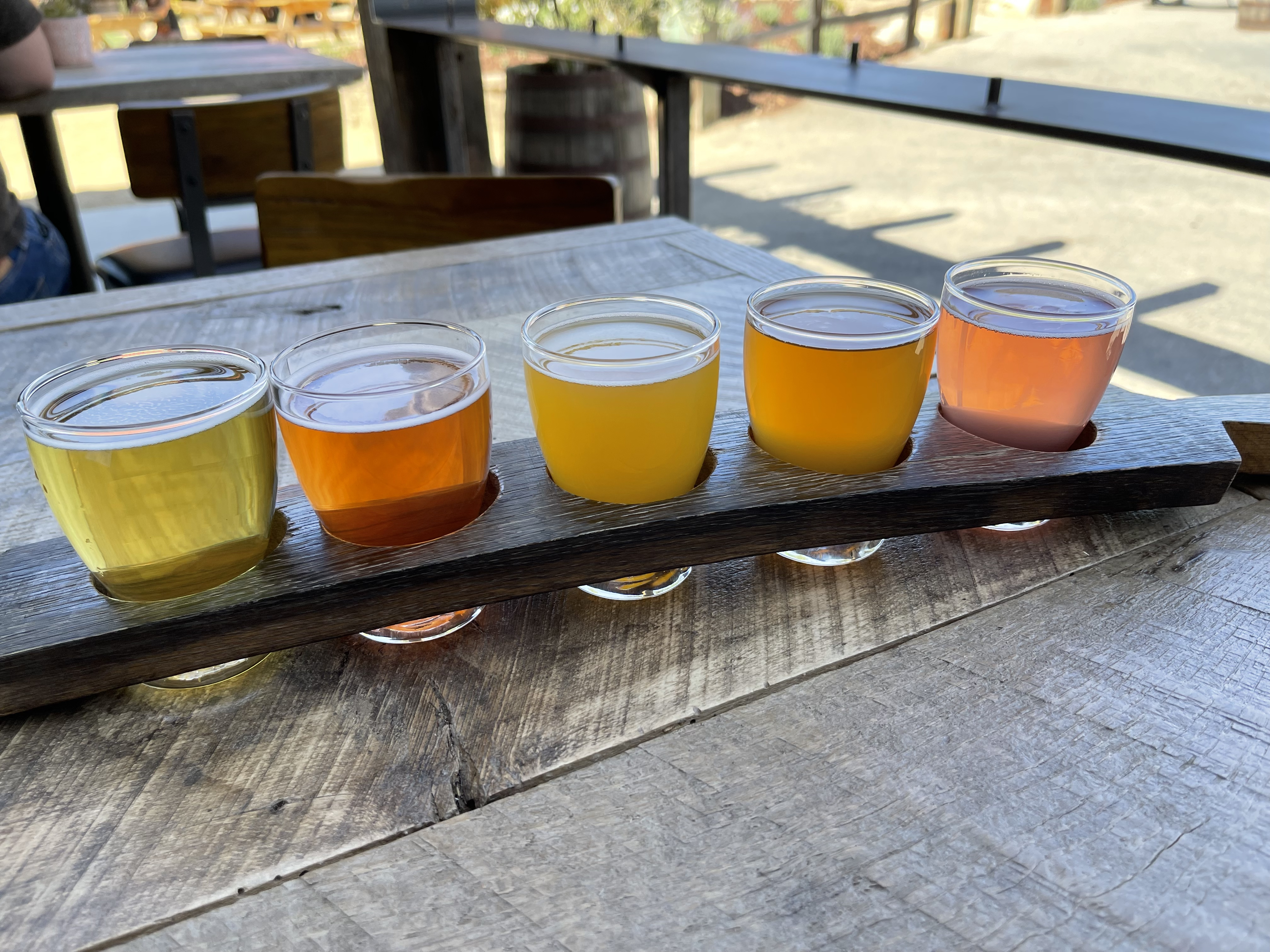
A beer flight with samples of different brews

Backslope is a brewery in Columbia Falls that opened in 2016. It is owned by Darin and Carla Fisher, with Darin as the brewer. They won the 2024 Small Brewery of the Year award from Montana Brewers Association. Their beers also took awards that year. Distant Neighbor won gold for Belgian and French Style Ales and Opulence took gold for Fruit, Vegetable, and Spiced Beer. At the 2025 Montana Beer Awards Opulance won the Sour Ales, Wild Ales, and Fruited Sour Ales category and Up From the Roots won silver in the Belgian & French-style Ales category.

=== Bar 3 Brewing ===
Bar 3 is a brewery in Belgrade. Their Wee Heavy won the 2024 bronze award in Scottish Style Ales from Montana Brewers Association. They won Small Brewery of the Year at the 2025 Montana Beer Awards. Their AWS won gold in the India Pale Ales category and Steep Peaks won silver in Experimental Beer.

=== Bayern Brewing ===
Bayern Brewery was opened in 1987 as the "only German brewery in the Rockies," and today is the oldest operating brewery in Montana. Brewers Thorsten Geuera and Jürgen Knöller are both from Germany and use all German equipment and recipes. They have 7 year round beers and distribute through 5 states.

=== Beaver Creek Brewery ===
The brewery was set up in Wibaux's historic old business district with equipment salvaged from the former Milestown Brewing Company in a former grocery store that had been closed since 1986. It was established in 2008 by Jim Devine and Sandon Stinnett. In 2021, Devine left the business.

Located at the edge of Eastern Montana, Beaver Creek Brewery describes itself as "an oasis in a desert of no microbreweries".The first year they were brewing at capacity of about 200 barrels a year. Despite low production, they have a distribution area spanning hundreds of miles because of the low population density of the region. As of 2024, they offer six standard beers as well as seasonals.

=== Beaverhead Brewing Company ===
Beaverhead Brewing opened in Dillon in 2014. Owner Brett Maki worked at Pyramid Brewing then Georgetown Brewing Company before deciding to open his own brewery. The business takes its name from the original brewery in Dillon which closed at the beginning of Prohibition.

=== Beehive Basin Brewery ===
Andy Liedberg and Casey Folley opened this Big Sky brewery in July 2015.

=== Bias Brewing ===
Bias Brewering was opened in 2018 in Kalispell. It is owned by Gabe Mariman and Adam Roberston. In 2022, Bias moved into the former Kalispell Brewing Company building on Main Street. In 2022, the brewery had 15 beers on tap.

Their Rice, Rice, Baby Lager won Gold in the Hop-forward Pale Lagers category at the 2025 Montana Beer Awards.

=== Big Sky Brewing Co. ===
Big Sky Brewing Company is a microbrewery in Missoula, founded in 1995 by Neal Leathers, Bjorn Nabozney, and Brad Robinson. Their beer is sold throughout the western United States. Popular beers are Moose Drool and Space Goat.

=== Big Spring Brewing Company ===
The brewery in Lewistown is owned by Rob Lehrkind, who also owns Julius Lehrkind in Bozeman. It has a partnership with its neighbor Central Feed Grilling Company. They have 5 main beers and a variety of rotators.

=== Bitter Root Brewing ===
Bitter Root, in Hamilton, became a brewery in 1998. Owner and brewer Tim Bozik converted dairy equipment for his first brewing tanks. The brewery takes its name from Montana's state flower, the bitterroot. The brewery regularly assists local non-profits through fundraisers and partnerships. They also have partnerships with local farms and businesses to provide ingredients. They always have 11 beers on tap. Adding the rotators, they serve up to 40 styles per year.

Awards
Beer	Category	Medal	Year	Bestower
Barley Ridge Nut Brown Ale	English Brown Ale	Gold	2010	North American Beer Awards
	English Brown Ale	Silver	2011	North American Beer Awards
	English Brown Ale	Bronze	2012	North American Beer Awards
	English-Style Brown Ale	Gold	2018	North American Beer Awards
	English-Style Brown Ale	Gold	2019	North American Beer Awards
Bitterroot Pale	(Special) Best Bitter	Silver	2011	North American Beer Awards
Blown Out Brown	English-Style Brown Ale	Gold	2016	North American Beer Awards
Cellar Series – Imperial Bourbon Porter	Smoke and Wood Flavored Beer	Silver	2023	North American Beer Awards
Collaboration Porter	Wood Flavored Beer	Silver	2010	North American Beer Awards
Huckleberry Honey Ale	Honey Beer	Silver	2010	North American Beer Awards
Imperial Citra Ale	American-Style Strong Ale	Bronze	2013	North American Beer Awards
Munich Helles Bock	Helles Bock/Malbock	Gold	2010	North American Beer Awards
Oktoberfest	Mazen-Oktoberfest	Gold	2011	North American Beer Awards
Sawtooth Ale	English-Style Summer Ale	Silver	2013	North American Beer Awards
	Light Ales/Hybrid	Gold	2024	Montana Brewers Association
Scottish Heart	Scotch Ale (Wee Heavy)	Silver	2012	North American Beer Awards
Wee Heavy	Scotch Ale (Wee Heavy)	Silver	2016	North American Beer Awards

=== Black Eagle Brewery ===
Black Eagle Brewery began in the town of Black Eagle in 2015. It is owned by Christa Heisler. Jason Lehman is the head brewer. They initially had a 15 barrel-capacity.

=== Blackfoot River Brewing ===
Blackfoot River Brewing is a microbrewery in Helena, opened in 1998 by Brian Smith, Greg Wermers, and Brad Simshaw. In 2008, they built a new facility on the parking lot next door.

In 2010, Tim Chisman became a brewer. In 2014, Chisman and Bethany Flint became the owners.

Beer is produced in 15-barrel batches.

==== Awards ====
Beer	Category	Medal	Year	Bestower
Blackfoot Helambic	Lambic	Silver	2015	North American Beer Awards
Blue Collar Bitter	(Extra Special) Strong Bitter ESB	Bronze	2011	North American Beer Awards
	Strong Bitter ESB (Extra Special)	Bronze	2017	North American Beer Awards
Double Black Diamond Extreme Stout	Foreign-Style Stout	Bronze	2017	North American Beer Awards
Milk Stout	Sweet Stout	Silver	2017	North American Beer Awards
Montambic	American-Style Wild or Sour Ale	Silver	2013	North American Beer Awards

=== Blacksmith Brewing Company ===
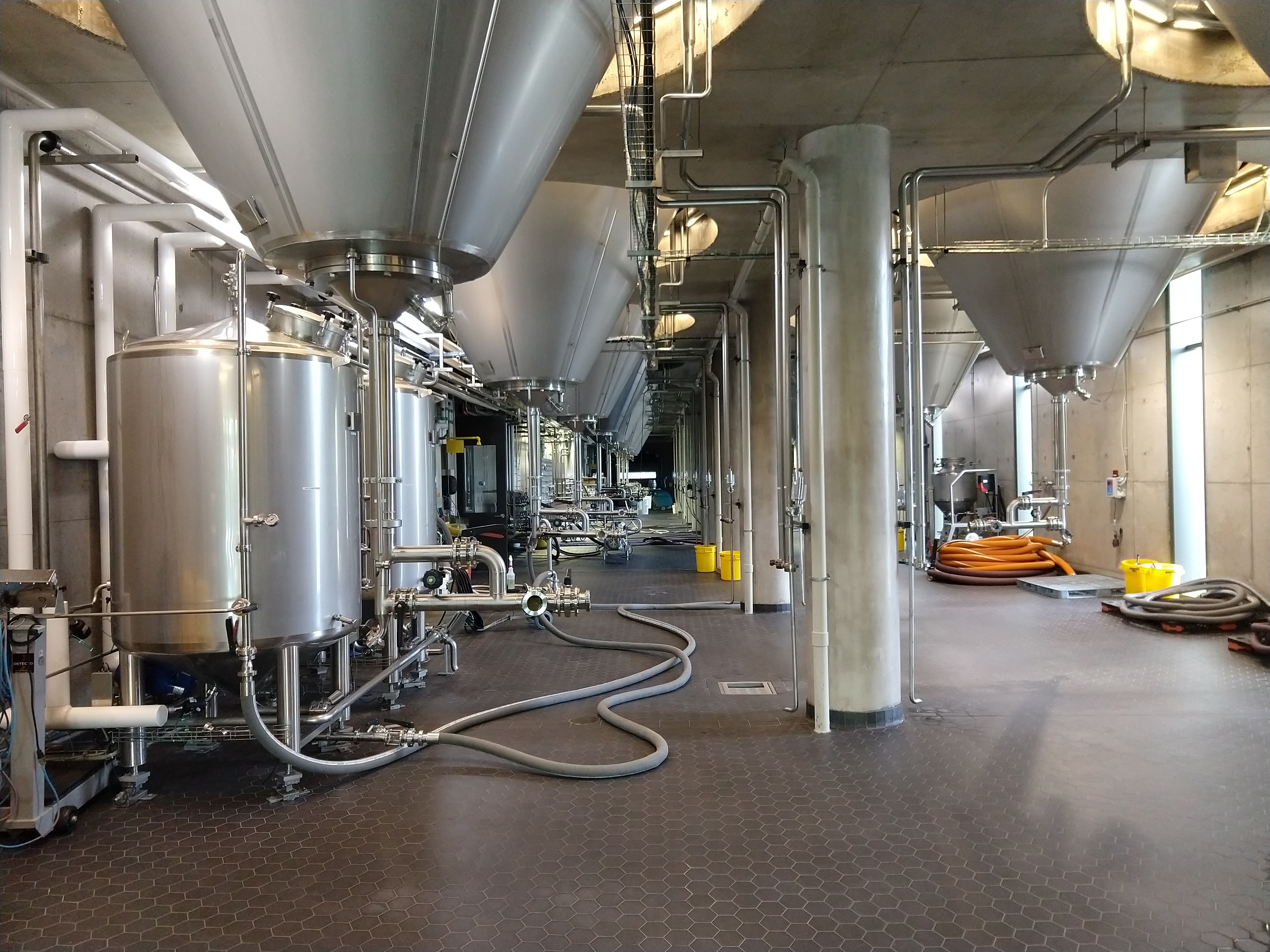
A large brewing facility

Blacksmith Brewing Company, in Stevensville, opened in 2008 by Eric Hayes. The building was a blacksmith shop and continues the theme, such as flights on anvil-shaped platters.

In 2022, it fell under new ownership.

At the 2022 North American Beer Awards, Pulaski Porter won silver in Brown Porter, Ravalli Red won bronze in Irish-Style Red Ale, Hop Water won bronze in Hop Water. Their Rink Rat Red Lager won the 2024 bronze award for Amber and Dark Lagers from the Montana Brewers Association.

=== Blue Ridge Brewing ===
Blue Ridge Brewery is located in Malta. It is owned by Bryan and Brianna Shores and started in 2018. Bryan is the brewmaster. The brewery takes its name from a local landmark.

=== Bonsai Brewing Project ===
Bonsai Brewing Project began in Whitefish in 2014. It is owned by Graham Hart and Keela Smith. Hart is the head brewer. Initially located in a strip mall, they moved a year later. They produce batches in 7 barrels.

=== Bozeman Brewing Company ===
Bozeman Brewing Company is in Bozeman. It was opened by Todd Scott in 2001.
Flagship Beer: Bozone Select.

Awards
Beer	Category	Medal	Year	Bestower
	Large Brewery of the Year		2024	Montana Brewers Association
Axolager Mexican-Style Lager	European Light Lager	Bronze	2024	Montana Brewers Association
Bozone Amber Ale	Altbier	Silver	2018	North American Beer Awards
	Amber Ales & hybrid styles	Gold	2025	Montana Beer Awards
Bozone Malbock	Helles Bock/ Malbock	Bronze	2013	North American Beer Awards
Bozone Vienna Lager	Vienna Lager	Bronze	2012	North American Beer Awards
Funky Fieldhand	Traditional Beers with Brettanomyces	Bronze	2024	North American Beer Awards
	Sour Ales, Wild Ales, & Fruited Sour Ales	Silver	2025	Montana Beer Awards
	Wine-Beer Hybrid	Bronze	2025	North American Beer Awards
Funky Virtue	American Style Wild or Sour Ales	Gold	2012	North American Beer Awards
Gallagator Doppelbock	Doppelbock	Bronze	2019	North American Beer Awards
Gallagher Doppel Bock	Doppelbock	Gold	2018	North American Beer Awards
The Great One Double Red	Double Imperial Red Ale	Bronze	2018	North American Beer Awards
Metamorphic Flanders Style Red Ale	Mixed-Culture and Wild Fruit Beers	Gold	2022	North American Beer Awards
	Flanders Style Red or Brown Ale	Silver	2025	North American Beer Awards
Montana Common Beer	California Common	Gold	2013	North American Beer Awards
Pinhead Pilsner	Bohemian-Style Pilsner	Gold	2012	North American Beer Awards
Plum Street Porter	Robust Porter	Silver	2015	North American Beer Awards
	Robust Porter	Silver	2016	North American Beer Awards
	Robust Porter	Gold	2017	North American Beer Awards
	Robust Porter	Gold	2021	North American Beer Awards
	Robust Porter	Gold	2022	World Beer Cup.
	Robust Porter	Bronze	2024	North American Beer Awards
	Robust Porter	Gold	2025	North American Beer Awards
Ridge Pils	North American Light Lager	Bronze	2024	Montana Brewers Association
Saru Zen	Asian-Style Lager	Gold	2025	North American Beer Awards
Solar Power Super Bock	Helles Bock/Malbock	Gold	2018	North American Beer Awards
Taurus Imperial Stout	Imperial Stout	Bronze	2019	North American Beer Awards
	Stout	Bronze	2022	North American Beer Awards
Vieux Bois 3 Year Blend	Lambic, Fruit Lambic and Gueuze Lambic	Silver	2024	North American Beer Awards
Vieux Bois Gueuze Inspired 3 Year Blend #3	Sour Ales/Wild Ales	Silver	2024	Montana Brewers Association
Vieux Bois Gueuze Inspired Blend #3	Lambic, Fruit Lambic and Gueuze Lambic	Gold	2023	World Beer Cup
Vieux Bois Lambic Inspired w/Apricot	Fruit Lambic and Gueuze Lambic	Bronze	2019	North American Beer Awards
	Fruit Lambic and Gueuze Lambic	Bronze	2021	North American Beer Awards
Vieux Bois Lambic Inspired w/Blackberry	Lambic, Fruit Lambic and Gueuze Lambic	Bronze	2023	
Vieux Bois Lambic Inspired Ale w/ Cranberry & Raspberry	Belgian Fruit Beer	Silver	2023	World Beer Cup
	Lambic, Fruit Lambic and Gueuze Lambic	Gold	2024	North American Beer Awards
Vieux Bois Lambic Inspired Wild Ale	Lambic, Fruit Lambic and Gueuze Lambic	Gold	2022	North American Beer Awards
Watershed Pale Ale	American-Style Pale Ale	Bronze	2015	North American Beer Awards

=== Branding Iron Brewing Co. ===
Branding Iron Brewing Co. is located in Eureka.

=== Bridger Brewing Company ===
Bridger Brewing Company opened in 2013 in Bozeman. In 2019, they announced plans to open a second, larger location in Three Forks. At that time they were the largest brewery in Bozeman by sales and volume, as well as one of the largest in the state. The location was eventually opened in 2022. In 2023 the Three Forks location grew to hosting a Summer Concert Series.

Awards
Beer	Category	Medal	Year	Bestower
Bimyo	Other Fruit Beers	Silver	2025	North American Beer Awards
Blue Horse	Kolsch	Gold	2024	North American Beer Awards
	Golden Ales & Hybrid Styles	Silver	2025	Montana Beer Awards
	Kolsch	Silver	2025	North American Beer Awards
Bobcat Brown Ale	English-Style Brown Ale	Gold	2019	Great American Beer Festival
Bridger Double	India Pale Ales	Silver	2025	Montana Beer Awards
Chasin' Haze	Hazy Pale Ales	Gold	2025	Montana Beer Awards
Ghost Town Coffee Stout	Coffee Beers	Gold	2018	North American Beer Awards
Higher Haze	Hazy Pale Ales	Bronze	2024	Montana Brewers Association
Hazy or Juicy Imperial or Double India Pale Ale	Bronze	2024	North American Beer Awards	
	Hazy or Juicy Imperial or Double India Pale Ale	Bronze	2025	North American Beer Awards
Lee Metcalf	Pale Ale	Gold	2024	Montana Brewers Association
	Pale Ale	Bronze	2025	Montana Beer Awards
Premo Pilsner	German-Style Pilsner	Silver	2024	North American Beer Awards
	Hop-forward Pale Lagers	Bronze	2025	Montana Beer Awards
	German-Style Pilsner	Gold	2025	North American Beer Awards
Wildlands Mexican Lager	Latin American or Tropical-Style Lager or Ale	Bronze	2024	North American Beer Awards
	Golden Ales & Hybrid Styles	Gold	2025	Montana Beer Awards

=== Burnt Tree Brewing ===
Burnt Tree Brewing, named after a local fishing access, is located in Ennis. It was opened in 2019 by Scott and Amy Kelley, with Dave McAdoo as head brewer. Their Dunkle Rauchbier won the 2024 gold award for Smoke and Wood Flavored Beer from Montana Brewers Association. At the 2025 Montana Beer Awards the Maui Magic took silver in the Fruit Beers category and Pink Boots Doppelbock won silver in Strong Lagers.

=== Busted Knuckle Brewery ===
Busted Knuckle Brewery, located in Glasgow, opened in June 2016. It is owned by Ben Boreson. In 2016, they won the Family Business Day award from Montana State University in the new business category.

=== Butte Brewing Company ===
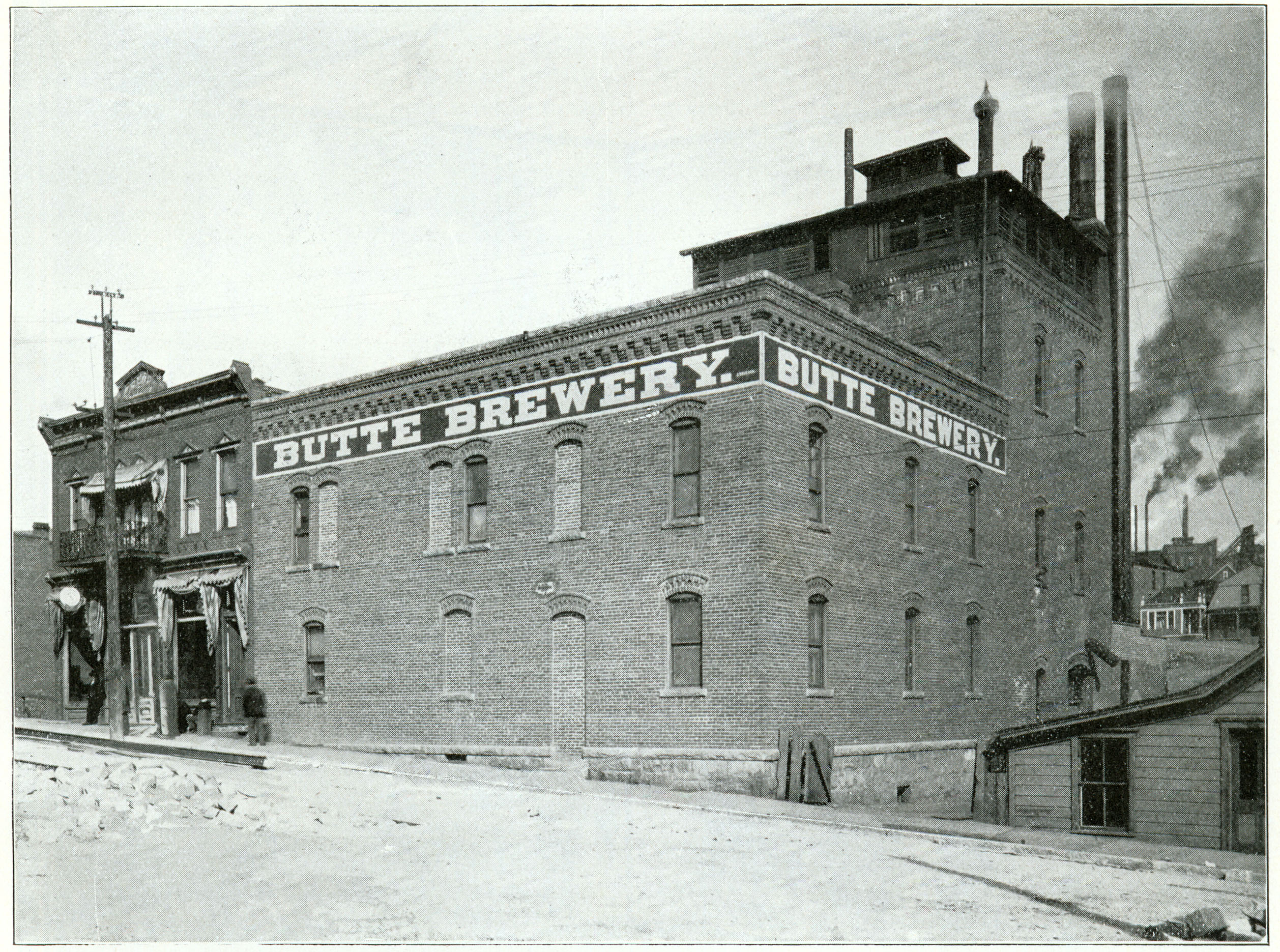
Old Butte Brewery, around 1900

Butte Brewing Company has a history in Butte since 1875. Eventually closing in 1965, it was reopened in 2015. It is owned by Tony Olson.

=== By All Means ===
By All Means, located in Billings, was started by Mark Hastings, Chad Broderius and Paul Morup of Uberbrew, along with Travis Zeilstra. Hastings is the Director of Brewing.

They won silver at the 2022 North American Beer Awards for the IPA 006 in the Hazy or Juicy Imperial or Double India Pale Ale. The same year they won gold at the US Open Beer Championship with their IPA-016 in Australian-Style Pale Ale as well as bronze in Vienna with Exklusiv.

=== Cabinet Mountain Brewing Company ===
Cabinet Mountain Brewing Company, in Libby, opened in 2014. It is owned by Sarah Sorensen and Kristin Smith. The Head Brewer is Gary Beach, who started in 2023. In 2018, Ross Creek Red won gold at the North American Beer Awards in the American-Style Amber Ale.

=== Canyon Creek Brewing ===
Canyon Creek Brewing opened in Billings in 2013. Ron Kalvig is the owner and head brewer.

==== Awards ====
Beer	Category	Medal	Year	Bestower
Cold Creek Scottish	Scottish-Style Export	Bronze	2016	North American Beer Awards
	Irish-Style Red Ale	Gold	2019	North American Beer Awards
Copper	Scottish-Style Heavy	Gold	2015	North American Beer Awards
	Scottish-Style Heavy	Bronze	2016	North American Beer Awards
	Scottish-Style Light, Heavy, and Export	Silver	2017	North American Beer Awards
	Scottish-Style Heavy	Gold	2018	North American Beer Awards
	Scottish Style Export	Gold	2019	North American Beer Awards
MinPin Pilsner	Dortmunder/Export	Gold	2015	North American Beer Awards
	Dortmunder/Export	Bronze	2016	North American Beer Awards
	Dortmunder Export	Bronze	2019	North American Beer Awards
One Night Stand	Golden or Blonde Ale	Silver	2016	North American Beer Awards
Rabbit Head Red	Irish-Style Red Ale	Silver	2015	North American Beer Awards
	Irish-Style Red Ale	Gold	2019	North American Beer Awards
	Irish-Style Red Ale	Silver	2022	Great American Beer Festival
CCB German Alt	German-Style Altbier	Bronze	2023	World Beer Cup

=== Canyon Ferry Brewing ===
Canyon Ferry Brewing in Townsend is owned by Kelli Gibbs and Tadd Fuhrman. It was opened in 2019 on the site of the town's original saloon

=== Carter's Brewing ===
Carter's Brewing Company, in Billings, opened in 2007 by Michael, Becky, and Carter Uhrich. Michael Uhrich is the head brewer. He previously worked at Yellowstone Valley Brewing Co. as a brewer. Starting with brewing 7 or 8 beers, Carter's was brewing 25 in 2023.

Awards
Beer	Category	Medal	Year	Bestower
Biere de Mars	Biere de Garde	Silver	2013	North American Beer Awards
	Saison	Gold	2025	North American Beer Awards
Blackened CDA	American-Style Black Ale	Silver	2011	Great American Beer Festival
Caldera Root Beer	Non-Alcoholic Soft Drinks (Soda)	Silver	2023	North American Beer Awards
Contemplation	American-Style Strong Ale	Bronze	2016	North American Beer Awards
Double Truck	Double/Imperial Irish Red Ale	Bronze	2011	North American Beer Awards
Eau Tableau	Belgian-Style Pale Ale	Bronze	2017	North American Beer Awards
	Belgian-Style Pale Ale	Silver	2018	North American Beer Awards
Eldorado ESB	English-Style Pale Ale	Bronze	2013	North American Beer Awards
Farmhouse Saison Locale	Saison	Gold	2019	North American Beer Awards
The Keeper	Biere de Garde	Silver	2015	North American Beer Awards
MJ's Framboise	American-Style Wild or Sour Ale	Silver	2016	North American Beer Awards
Rob Moore Abbey Ale	Dubbel	Silver	2018	North American Beer Awards
Rob Moore Grand Cru	Dubbel	Bronze	2016	North American Beer Awards
Saison de Carter	Saison	Bronze	2013	North American Beer Awards
Smokehouse Lager	German-Style Rauchbier	Silver	2013	North American Beer Awards
Sweet tooth Bock	Traditional Bock	Silver	2017	North American Beer Awards
Switchyard Scottish Ale	Scottish-Style Export	Silver	2019	North American Beer Awards
Uncommon Vienna Lager	Vienna-Style Lager	Bronze	2025	North American Beer Awards

=== Copper Furrow Brewing ===
Copper Furrow Brewing, in Helena, is owned by David McKeever, Nick Diehl and Mick Mondloch. Diehl is the head brewer. The brewery opened in 2018. Originally named Crooked Furrow, after a way of planting seeds, the name was changed in 2019 due to a trademark dispute. Copper is in reference to Butte, one of the owners hometown's.

At the 2023 Great American Beer Festival, Tmavé won silver for the International Dark Lager category. And the English Brown won bronze in the English-Style Brown Ale at the North American Beer Awards. Their Winter Warmer won the 2024 gold award in Strong Ales from the Montana Brewers Association. Tmave won gold in Czech Dark Lagers at the North American Beer Awards.

=== Cranky Sam Brewing ===
Cranky Sam Brewing, in Missoula, is located next to Cranky Sam Taproom. It is owned by Jennifer and Jed Heggen and co-owned by Timmy Evon. Head Brewer is Ryan Cole. The building is located in what was once the red-light district in the early 1900s. The name refers to an outlaw who operated an opium den, among other activities, in the neighborhood. The renovation of the building prior to opening unearthed several treasures.

==== Awards ====
Beer	Category	Medal	Year	Bestower
	Medium brewery of the year		2025	Montana Beer Awards
Baltic Porter	Strong Lagers	Bronze	2025	Montana Beer Awards
Cranky's Cabin	Old Ale	Bronze	2021	U.S. Open Beer Championship
Hefeweizen Dunkel	Dunkelweizen/Weizen Bock	Gold	2023	North American Beer Awards
	German Wheat	Bronze	2023	U.S. Open Beer Championship
Helles	Munich-Style Helles	Bronze	2025	Great American Beer Festival
Inisfail	Dry Stout	Gold	2022	North American Beer Awards
Instigator Doppelbock	Doppelbock Eisbock	Bronze	2022	North American Beer Awards
	Dopple/Strong Bock	Silver	2022	U.S. Open Beer Championship
Tropical Blonde	English Summer Ale	Gold	2021	U.S. Open Beer Championship
	English Summer Ale	Silver	2022	U.S. Open Beer Championship
	English Summer Ale	Bronze	2023	U.S. Open Beer Championship
Noble Pilsner	European Light Lagers	Silver	2024	Montana Brewers Association
	Hop-forward Pale Lagers	Silver	2025	Montana Beer Awards
Snowslip Stout	Brown & Black Ales	Silver	2025	Montana Beer Awards

=== Crazy Peak Brewing Company ===
Crazy Peak Brewing Company, in Big Timber, is a family-owned business. It opened in 2019. Nathan Eggebrecht is the master brewer. One of their most popular beers is the P.O.G., standing for pineapple, orange, guava.

=== Cross Country Brewing ===
Cross Country Brewing, in Glendive, opened in March 2017. It is owned by Lonnie and Justin Cross. John and Elliot Cross are the master brewers.

=== Diamond X Beer Company ===
Diamond X Beer Company opened in Billings in 2021. Sean Graves, who also owns Montana Brewing Company, is a co-owner. Gabe Thom is the Head Brewer. A nearby disc golf course inspired the name.

At the 2022 North American Beer Awards, BEE-town won silver in Honey Beer and Caber Tosser won bronze in Scottish-Style Ale Scottish-Style Export. In the 2023 World Beer Cup, their Caber Tosser took bronze in the Scottish-Style Ale category. Caber Tosser won silver in Scottish-Ale at the 2025 Great American Beer Festival.

=== Draught Works Brewery ===
Draught Works Brewery is a microbrewery and tasting room in Missoula. It was opened by Paul Marshall and Jeff Grant in 2011. Both studied brewing at the Siebel Institute of Technology and World Brewing Academy in Chicago. The brewery has six flagship beers. In 2022, the head brewer was Kyle Sillars. Their best-seller is the West Coast Scepter IPA.

In 2014 they won Very Small Brewery of the Year at the Great American Beer Festival.

Awards
Beer	Category	Medal	Year	Bestower
Bobs your uncle	Ordinary Bitter Best Bitter (ESB)	Bronze	2017	North American Beer Awards
Cali-bunga Common	California Common	Silver	2019	North American Beer Awards
Citrus Cowboy	Low Carb/Low Calorie Hard Seltzers	Gold	2022	North American Beer Awards
Daywalker	American-Style Amber Ale	Silver	2018	North American Beer Awards
Gwin Du	Dry Stout	Bronze	2017	North American Beer Awards
Lemon Meringue Sour	American-Style Wild or Sour Ale	Silver	2018	North American Beer Awards
My Ruca	Australian-Style Pale Ale	Silver	2020	U.S. Open Beer Championships
	American-Style Pale Ale	Gold	2022	North American Beer Awards
	American-Style Pale Ale	Silver	2023	North American Beer Awards
Nine Circles	Cream Ale	Bronze	2017	North American Beer Awards
Pickle Power Sour	Vegetable, Pumpkin, or Field Beers	Bronze	2023	North American Beer Awards
Scepter Head	American-Style Strong Pale Ale	Gold	2014	Great American Beer Festival
Shadow Caster Amber Ale	Ordinary Bitter	Bronze	2015	North American Beer Awards
That's What She Said	Cream Ale	Bronze	2015	North American Beer Awards
	Cream Ale	Gold	2021	North American Beer Awards
White Witing	Belgian-Style Wit (White)	Silver	2021	North American Beer Awards
Tropical Express	Low Carb/Low Calorie Hard Seltzers	Gold	2023	North American Beer Awards

=== Flathead Lake Brewing Company ===
Flathead Lake Brewing Company was opened in 2004 by Greg Johnston and Terry Leonard. It has locations in Woods Bay and Bigfork. In 2018, they won the inaugural Montana Sustainabrew Award.

==== Awards ====
Beer	Category	Medal	Year	Bestower
Barrel 14 Sour	Flanders-Style Red or Brown Ale	Silver	2015	North American Beer Awards.
Mendocino Oud Bruin	Flanders-Style Red or Brown Ale	Silver	2016	North American Beer Awards.
Montucky Sour Cherry Brown	Flanders-Style Red or Brown Ale		2012	North American Beer Awards.
	Flanders-Style Red or Brown Ale	Bronze	2015	North American Beer Awards.
Mutiny	American-Style Stout	Silver	2006	World Beer Cup
Peg Leg	Robust Porter	Bronze	2006	World Beer Cup

=== Freefall Brewery ===
Freefall Brewery is a family-owned brewery in Bozeman.

=== Gally's Brewing Company ===
Gally's Brewing Company is a family-owned brewery in Harlowton. Some of their most popular beers are the Hopley Creek pale ale and Collateral Damage IPA.

=== Gild Brewing ===
Gild Brewing is located in the former Crystal Theater in Missoula. They choose to have a rotating selection with no mainstays. At the 2025 Montana Beer Awards their Queen of Cups won bronze in the Hazy Pale Ales category.

=== Glacier Brewing Company ===
Glacier Brewing Company is a microbrewery in Polson, opened in 2002 by Dave Ayers. It was purchased December 5, 2019 by Ron May and then by Jeff Carter April 5, 2023. In 2023, they won People's Choice Award for Best Beer for its Snowpack Limoncello Seltzer at the Bigfork Brewfest. The manager in 2023 said seltzers make up to 30% of the brewery's production.

=== Great Burn Brewing Company ===
Great Burn Brewing Company in Missoula is named in homage to the Great Fire of 1910. It was opened in 2013. Michael Howard is the brew master.

=== Harvest Moon Brewing Company ===
Harvest Moon Brewing Company, in Belt, opened in 1996 by Stan Guedesse. Their flagship beer is the Beltian White Ale. In 2016 it made up about 60% of sales.

=== Highlander Beer - Missoula Brewing Company ===
Highlander Beer has a location in Missoula and Salmon, Idaho. Hannah Talbott is the president of the company. They are known for hazy IPAs. At the 2016 Great American Beer Festival, their Highlander Devil's Hump Red Ale took gold in the Irish-Style Red Ale category. Their Tangerine Squeezer won the 2024 silver award for Fruit, Vegetable, and Spiced Beers from Montana Brewers Association. At the 2025 Montana Beer Awards the Peaks to Prairie Bock won silver in the Peaks to Prairie category which requires 100% of ingredients to be local. The Scotch Ale won bronze in the Scottish-style Ale category.

=== Higherground Brewing Company ===
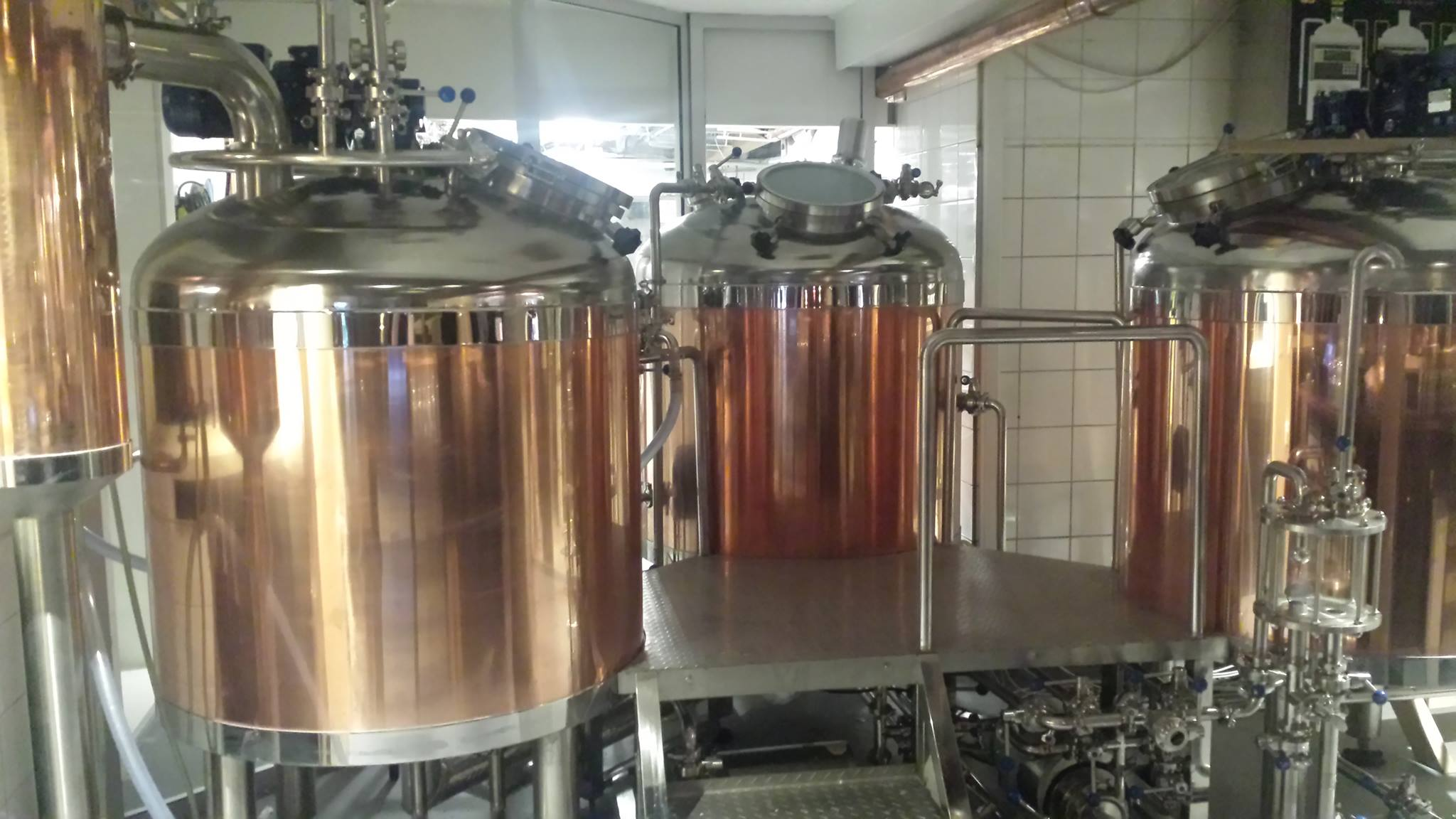
Craft brewing facility

Higherground Brewing Company, in Hamilton, is owned by Jasper Miller and Fenn Nelson. Miller is the head brewer. In the 2018 World Beer Cup, their Hop Tamer Session IPA won silver in the Session India Pale Ale category.

=== High Plains Brewing ===
High Plains Brewing is located in Laurel. It is owned by Dave Bequette.

=== Imagine Nation Brewing Company ===
Imagine Nation Brewing Company is in Missoula, founded in 2015. They have a vision to "fuel social change", supporting the community and local nonprofits. As of 2023, they have hosted over 3,500 community events and donated 25% of profits to over 500 community groups.

In January 2024 they introduced Lupujus ZERO, Montana's first craft brewed non-alcoholic beer, led by brewer Toby Benjamin and head brewer Sean Nevins.

Their Eras beer won the 2024 silver award for North American Light Lagers from Montana Brewers Association.

After 10 years of business, they closed their West Broadway taproom and community center in March 2025, moving all operations to the former site of Cymatic Fermentation Project in the industrial district near Missoula Montana Airport. In September 2025, the brewery was "legally forced to temporarily suspend" taproom operations due to licensing issues. As of January 2026, the taproom remains closed with the facility listed for sale.

=== Jeremiah Johnson Brewing Company ===
Jeremiah Johnson Brewing Company is named for the owner, Jeremiah Johnson. Johnson and his wife, Katie, purchased the assets of The Front Brewing Company in 2018, after managing that brewery since the beginning of 2017. They have a production facility capable of brewing 15,000 BBLS annually in Great Falls as well as smaller batch brewery in Whitefish capable of brewing about 1,500 BBLS annually. A large percent of the beer brewed in Whitefish is sold onsite at their partner brewpub aptly named Blackstar for the landmark building in downtown Whitefish. Jeremiah and Katie also own a brewpub, Jeremiah Johnson Brewing Company, in Coeur d'Alene, Idaho.

In 2023 the brewery was named the official craft beer of the Big Sky Conference, an NCAA Division I conference. Their Nightlight won the 2024 bronze award for Belgian and French Style Ales from Montana Brewers Association. The Oh Baby a Tripel!! won bronze in the category at the 2025 Montana Beer Awards. Fear Fun won bronze in the Experimental Beer category.

In previous years, Jeremiah Johnson Brewing Company has garnered various awards for their flagship Mountain Man Scotch Ale, Hazy IPA, Vanilla Porter, Honey Weizen and Blonde Ale(s).

Jeremiah Johnson Brewing Company has a partnership with MacKenzie River Pizza and produces their proprietary, Driftboat Amber Ale, for all of their locations within the United States.

In 2024, Jeremiah Johnson Brewing Company began to sell beer internationally in Taiwan.

=== Julius Lehrkind Brewing ===
Julius Lehrkind Brewing originally was in Bozeman from 1895 to 1919, named Julius Lehrkind's Genuine Lager Brewery. It closed with the federal prohibition. In 2018 the family opened another brewery. The Lehrkind family also owns the area Coca-Cola distribution facility, Mountain Country Distributing, and Big Spring Water.

=== Katabatic Brewing Company ===
Katabatic Brewing Company is in Livingston. Katabatic wind makes Livingston one of the windiest places in the country. It is owned by Shawn Markman and the head brewer is Ben Ward. Markman acquired the business in 2020.

At the 2015 North American Beer Awards, the Anabatic Amber won gold in the American-Style Amber Ale category. The Alternative Polka won bronze at the 2016 North American Beer Awards in the Altbier category. Their Katabatic Scotch Ale won the 2024 gold award in Scottish Style Ales from Montana Brewers Association. In 2025 the Muzzleloader Chocolate Stout won gold in the Brown & Black Ales category at the Montana Beer Awards. Peaks to Prairie Session Pale won gold in the Peaks to Prairie category which requires using 100% local ingredients.

=== KettleHouse Brewing Company ===
KettleHouse Brewing Company was established in 1996 by Tim O'Leary and Suzy Rizza. There is a taproom in Missoula and a taproom and brewery/cannery in Bonner. They distribute to 5 states as of 2024.

=== Koocanusa Brewery ===
Koocanusa Brewery is in Eureka. Owner Barry Roose opened the brewery in 2020.

=== Last Best Place Brewing Company ===
Last Best Place Brewing Company was opened in Bozeman by Colin Ruh-Kirk in 2021.

=== Lazy I Beerworks ===
Lazy I Beerworks is in Wolf Creek. It is owned by Erick Iverson and Ashley Puerzer. Iverson is the brewer.

=== Lewis and Clark Brewing Company ===
Lewis and Clark Brewing Company is in Helena. It was opened in 2005 by Max Pigman.

Awards
Beer	Category	Medal	Year	Bestower
Back Country Scottish Ale	Scottish-Style Ale	Silver	2014	Great American Beer Festival
	English-Style Brown Ale	Bronze	2019	North American Beer Awards
	Scottish-Style Ale	Gold	2020	Great American Beer Festival
	Ordinary Bitter Best Bitter Scottish-Style Ale	Gold	2023	North American Beer Awards
	English-Style Brown Ale	Silver	2024	Great American Beer Festival
	Brown and Black Ales	Gold	2024	Montana Brewers Association
	Scottish-Style Ale	Silver	2025	North American Beer Awards
Halo Huckleberry Hefeweizen	Fruit Beer	Bronze	2023	North American Beer Awards
	Other Fruit Beers	Silver	2024	North American Beer Awards
	Fruit Beer	Bronze	2025	Montana Beer Awards
Juicy Obsession	Session India Pale Ale	Silver	2024	North American Beer Awards
	India Pale Ales	Bronze	2025	Montana Beer Awards
Mexican Lager	North American Light Lagers	Gold	2024	Montana Brewers Association
Miner's Gold Hefeweizen	American-Style Wheat Beer with yeast	Silver	2012	World Beer Cup
		Silver	2017	Great American Beer Festival
	American-Style Wheat Beer with yeast	Gold	2018	World Beer Cup
		Gold	2018	Great American Beer Festival
	American-Style Hefeweizen	Gold	2018	North American Beer Awards
	American-Style Hefeweizen	Gold	2019	North American Beer Awards
	American Wheat Beer	Bronze	2021	Great American Beer Festival
	American-Style Hefeweizen Dark Hefeweizen	Gold	2022	North American Beer Awards
	American Wheat Beer	Bronze	2023	World Beer Cup
	American-Style Hefeweizen Dark Hefeweizen	Gold	2023	North American Beer Awards
	American Wheat Beer	Silver	2025	Great American Beer Festival
	Wheat Ales	Gold	2025	Montana Beer Awards
	American-Style Wheat Ale	Bronze	2025	North American Beer Awards
Pompey's Pilsner	Bohemian-Style Pilsener	Silver	2018	Great American Beer Festival
	Bohemian Style Pilsner	Silver	2023	North American Beer Awards
Prickly Pear Pale Ale	Classic English-Style Pale Ale	Silver	2018	World Beer Cup
		Bronze	2018	Great American Beer Festival
	English-Style Pale Ale	Silver	2022	North American Beer Awards
	English Ale	Silver	2023	World Beer Cup
	English Ale	Bronze	2023	Great American Beer Festival
	English-Style Pale Ale	Gold	2023	North American Beer Awards
	English-Style Pale Ale	Bronze	2024	North American Beer Awards
	English Style Pale Ale	Gold	2025	North American Beer Awards
Tropical Fusion Hard Seltzer	Alternative Products	Bronze	2024	Montana Brewers Association
Tumbleweed IPA	English-Style India Pale Ale	Bronze	2018	North American Beer Awards
	English-Style India Pale Ale	Silver	2022	North American Beer Awards
	English Style Pale Ale	Silver	2025	North American Beer Awards
Yellowstone Golden Ale	Light Ale	Silver	2019	North American Beer Awards
	Golden Ale	Bronze	2025	North American Beer Awards

=== Limberlost Brewing Company ===
Limberlost Brewing Company is in Thompson Falls. It is named for a campground in the Willamette National Forest in Oregon.

=== Lolo Peak Brewing Company ===
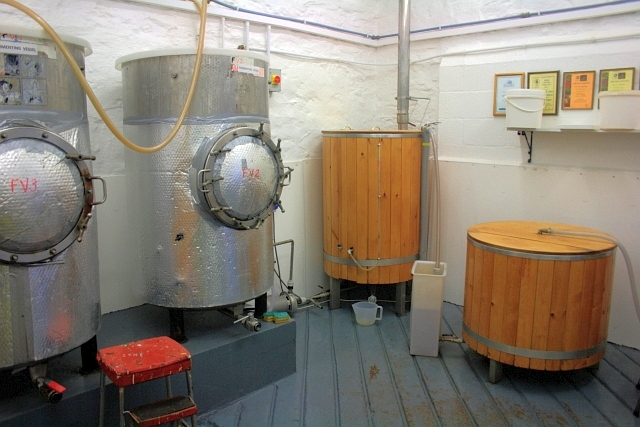
Back room of microbrewery

Lolo Peak Brewing Company is in Lolo. They were the first brewery in Montana to use a system to capture and reuse carbon dioxide. In 2014, it was owned by Al Zepeda and Pat Offen.

=== Madison River Brewing Company ===
Madison River Brewing Company is in Belgrade. Howard McMurry established the brewery in 2005. Their beer is distributed to multiple states.

Awards
Beer	Category	Medal	Year	Bestower
58 Schilling	Scottish-Style Light, Heavy and Export	Silver	2012	North American Beer Awards
Black Ghost Oatmeal Stout	Oatmeal Stout	Gold	2021	North American Beer Awards
Copper John	Scottish Ales	Gold	2010	North American Beer Awards
	Scottish Export	Gold	2011	North American Beer Awards
	Scottish-Style Light, Heavy and Export	Gold	2012	North American Beer Awards
	Scottish-Style Ale	Gold	2015	Great American Beer Festival
	Scottish-Style Export	Silver	2016	North American Beer Awards
	Scottish-Style Light, Heavy, and Export	Gold	2017	North American Beer Awards
	Scottish-Style Export	Silver	2019	North American Beer Awards
	Scottish-Style Export	Gold	2021	North American Beer Awards
	Scottish-Style Ale	Silver	2021	Great American Beer Festival
	Scottish-Style Ale	Silver	2024	Montana Brewers Association
Frostbite Barley Wine	American Barley Wines	Gold	2010	North American Beer Awards
	American Barley Wine	Gold	2011	North American Beer Awards
	American-Style Barley Wine	Silver	2021	North American Beer Awards
	American Barley Wine	Gold	2022	North American Beer Awards
	American Barley Wine	Gold	2023	North American Beer Awards
	Strong Ales	Silver	2024	Montana Brewers Association
	American-Style Barleywine	Bronze	2024	North American Beer Awards
Frostbite Barley Wine 09	American Barley Wines	Gold	2012	North American Beer Awards
Golden Willie Ale	Cream Ale	Bronze	2016	North American Beer Awards
Irresistible Amber Ale	Kentucky Common or Fresh Hop Beers	Gold	2023	North American Beer Awards
Salmon Fly Honey Rye	Rye Beer	Gold	2011	North American Beer Awards
	Session Beer	Gold	2017	North American Beer Awards

=== MAP Brewing Company ===
MAP Brewing Company is located in Bozeman. It is owned by Patrick Kainz and the head brewer is Doug Child.

Beginning in 2018, they began an annual collaboration brew called the Fempire Strikes Back, a New England Style IPA. The beer is part of a worldwide brew day benefiting the Pink Boots Society.

Awards
Beer	Category	Medal	Year	Bestower
	Large brewery of the year		2025	Montana Beer Awards
40 South	Pale Ales	Bronze	2024	Montana Brewers Association
80 Chain Oatmeal Stout	Oatmeal Stout	Silver	2019	North American Beer Awards
	Oatmeal Stout	Gold	2019	Great American Beer Festival
Asphyxiation	Belgian-Style Dark Strong Ale	Bronze	2018	North American Beer Awards
Catalina Whine Mixer	Sour Ales/Wild Ales	Gold	2024	Montana Brewers Association
Ginjo Sake Lager	Specialty, Historical and Experimental Beers	Silver	2022	North American Beer Awards
Great Wave Sake Lager	Experimental Beer	Bronze	2022	Great American Beer Festival
	Experimental Beer	Gold	2024	Great American Beer Festival
	Experimental Beer	Gold	2025	Montana Beer Awards
Luke SkyLager	German-Style Pilsner	Gold	2022	North American Beer Awards
M8 Mountain Lager	Malt-forward European Pale Lagers	Bronze	2025	Montana Beer Awards
Party	International-Style Pilsener	Bronze	2019	Great American Beer Festival
Pat's River Beer	American-Style Lager	Bronze	2024	Great American Beer Festival
	American & International Pale Lagers	Gold	2025	Montana Beer Awards
Peaks to Prairie Red IPA	Peaks to Prairie	Bronze	2025	Montana Beer Awards
Ridge Hippie	Kolsch	Silver	2017	North American Beer Awards
Speedy G	Wood and Barrel-aged Sour Beer	Bronze	2023	Great American Beer Festival
Speedy GonGose	Flavored Gose	Gold	2019	North American Beer Awards
Speedy G Tequila Gose	Flavored Gose	Silver	2018	North American Beer Awards
Steep Terrain	Double/Imperial India Pale Ale	Bronze	2016	North American Beer Awards

=== Meadowlark Brewing Company ===
Meadowlark Brewing Company has locations in both Sidney and Billings. It is owned by Travis Peterson. At the 2019 Great American Beer Festival, Fungus Shui took gold in the Experimental Beer category and Mob Barley won bronze in the Aged Beer category. In 2025 Black Steers Took us won silver in Oatmeal Stout at the North American Beer Awards.

=== Mighty Mo Brewing Company ===
Mighty Mo Brewing Company is in Great Falls. Casey Kingsland and Seth Swingley opened the business in 2013. They partner with Jeremiah Johnson Brewing to use facilities for brewing and packaging. Their Whiplash won the 2024 and 2025 bronze award for Brown and Black Ales from the Montana Brewers Association.

=== Missouri River Brewing Company ===
Missouri River Brewing Company is in East Helena. It was opened by Adam Hutchinson, Jaramia Bunker, Scott Hansing and Tim Moran. It is owned by Hutchinson, Bunker and Hansing.

=== Montana Brewing Company ===
Montana Brewing Company is in Billings. It was opened in 1994 by CSKT Inc. It is owned by Sean Graves, also the owner of Diamond X Brewery.

Awards
Beer	Category	Medal	Year	Bestower
	American-Style Pale Ale	Bronze	1999	Great American Beer Festival
Billings Blonde Ale	Belgian-Style Pale (Golden) Strong Al	Bronze	2012	North American Beer Awards
Custer's Last Stout	Foreign (Export)-Style Stout	Gold	2004	Great American Beer Festival
	Foreign (Export)-Style Stout	Silver	2007	Great American Beer Festival
	Foreign Stout	Bronze	2010	North American Beer Awards
	Oatmeal Stout	Gold	2011	North American Beer Awards
	Oatmeal Stout	Silver	2013	North American Beer Awards
	Oatmeal Stout	Silver	2015	North American Beer Awards
	Oatmeal Stout	Bronze	2016	North American Beer Awards
	Oatmeal Stout	Gold	2022	North American Beer Awards
Doreen's Downtown Ale	English Brown Ale	Gold	2011	North American Beer Awards
	Brown Porter	Silver	2011	North American Beer Awards
Fat Belly Amber	English Mild Ale	Silver	2011	North American Beer Awards
Happy Hour Hero Ale	Ordinary Bitter	Bronze	2011	North American Beer Awards
	Ordinary Bitter	Gold	2012	North American Beer Awards
	Ordinary or Special Bitter	Silver	2012	World Beer Cup
Hooligan's Irish Red Ale	Irish-Style Red Ale	Bronze	2015	Great American Beer Festival
	American Amber Ale	Gold	2011	North American Beer Awards
	American-Style Amber Ale	Gold	2012	North American Beer Awards
	Irish-Style Red Ale	Gold	2015	North American Beer Awards
	Irish-Style Red Ale	Silver	2019	North American Beer Awards
Juice-Head Gorilla Imperial IPA	Double/Imperial India Pale Ale	Silver	2012	North American Beer Awards
MBC Amber	English-Style Mild Ale	Bronze	2012	North American Beer Awards
MBC Golden Ale	English-Style Summer Ale	Bronze	2012	North American Beer Awards
	Golden or Blonde Ale	Bronze	2013	North American Beer Awards
MBC Pale Ale	American-Style Pale Ale	Gold	2012	North American Beer Awards
MBC Wheat	Hefeweizen, Dark Hefeweizen	Gold	2012	North American Beer Awards
Prohibition Pilsner	American-Style Standard or Premium Lager	Gold	2015	North American Beer Awards
Red Sorrel Holiday Ale	Herbed/Spiced	Gold	2013	North American Beer Awards
Sandbagger Gold	English-Style Summer Ale	Silver	2005	Great American Beer Festival
	English-Style Summer Ale	Gold	2006	Great American Beer Festival
	English-Style Summer Ale	Gold	2007	Great American Beer Festival
	English-Style Summer Ale	Bronze	2008	World Beer Cup
	English-Style Summer Ale	Bronze	2010	Great American Beer Festival
	English-Style Summer Ale	Bronze	2010	World Beer Cup
	Cream Ale	Silver	2016	North American Beer Awards
	Cream Ale	Gold	2019	North American Beer Awards
	Cream Ale	Gold	2022	North American Beer Awards
	Light Ales/Hybrid	Gold	2024	Montana Brewers Association
Scottish Woodruff Ale	Herbed/Spiced	Gold	2019	North American Beer Awards
Sharptail Pale Ale	American-Style Pale Ale	Gold	1998	Great American Beer Festival
	American-Style Pale Ale	Silver	2008	World Beer Cup
	American-Style Pale Ale	Silver	2010	World Beer Cup
	American Pale Ale	Gold	2011	North American Beer Awards
Stillwater Rye	French-Belgian Style Saison	Bronze	2005	Great American Beer Festival
	Herb and Spice Beer	Bronze	2008	World Beer Cup
	Herb and Spice or Chocolate Beer	Gold	2009	Great American Beer Festival
	Herbed/Spiced	Gold	2010	North American Beer Awards
	Herb and Spice Beer	Bronze	2010	World Beer Cup
	Herbed/Spiced	Gold	2011	North American Beer Awards
"That Dame" ESB	Strong Bitter ESB (Extra Special)	Gold	2016	North American Beer Awards
Two Moon Saison	Strong Belgian Ales	Gold	2010	North American Beer Awards
	Saison	Silver	2011	North American Beer Awards
White Eagle Baltic Porter	Baltic-Style Porter	Silver	2011	Great American Beer Festival
	Baltic-Style Porter	Bronze	2012	North American Beer Awards
Whitetail Wheat	American-Style Hefeweizen	Gold	2007	Great American Beer Festival
	American-Style Hefeweizen	Bronze	2008	Great American Beer Festival
	American Hefeweizen	Gold	2010	North American Beer Awards
	American-Style Wheat Beer with yeast	Bronze	2010	World Beer Cup
	American-Style Wheat Beer with yeast	Gold	2014	World Beer Cup
Wheat Ale	American-Style Wheat Beer with yeast	Gold	2012	Great American Beer Festival

=== Mountains Walking Brewery ===
Mountains Walking Brewery is located in Bozeman. The head brewer is Eric White. They typically have 20 to 25 beers on tap.

They have a "phantom brewery" with New Hokkaido Beverage Co. where brewer Gustav Gentaro Dose creates rice beer in the Japanese style.

==== Awards ====
Beer	Category	Medal	Year	Bestower
Grazing Clouds	Hazy or New England-Style India Pale Ale	Gold	2018	North American Beer Awards
Damsel Fly	International Pale Ale	Bronze	2022	World Beer Cup
	Pale Ales	Gold	2024	Montana Brewers Association
Daruma IPA	India Pale Ales	Bronze	2024	Montana Brewers Association
Digger Bee	Honey Beer	Silver	2019	North American Beer Awards
Lychee Kozo	Alternative Products	Gold	2024	Montana Brewers Association
Sky Flowers IPA	Experimental India Pale Ale	Silver	2023	World Beer Cup

=== MT Ascension Brewing Company ===
MT Ascension Brewing Company, in Helena, is named for a popular local trail. It opened in 2022 with head brewer Bex Peppelman. At the 2025 Montana Beer Awards their Nob Hill won silver in the Scottish-style Ales category.

=== Neptune's Brewery ===
Neptune's Brewery is in Livingston. The head brewer is Cody Phillips and the owner is Jon Berens. They won the 2024 Medium Brewery of the Year award from Montana Brewers Association. Their Dan Bailey's won gold in Amber Ales/Hybrid and Anchor's Away took bronze. At the 2025 Montana Beer Awards their Scottish Ale won the Scottish-style Ales category.

=== Old Bull Brewing ===
Old Bull Brewing is located in Frenchtown. Nic Pestel is head brewer. Pestel owns Old Bull along with his wife Theresa. Their Buffalo Jump won gold at the 2021 North American Beer Awards in American-Style Brown Ale. In 2022, Exit 89 won gold at the North American Beer Awards in the Golden or Blonde Ale category. Their Kind of a Big Dill won the 2024 gold award in Experimental Beers from Montana Brewers Association. At the 2025 Montana Beer Awards, Snowy Survey won the Strong Ales category. They also won at the North American Beer Awards, silver for Broadside in English-Style Mild Ale and bronze for Kind of a big dill in Herbed/Spiced Beers.

=== OddPitch Brewing Company ===
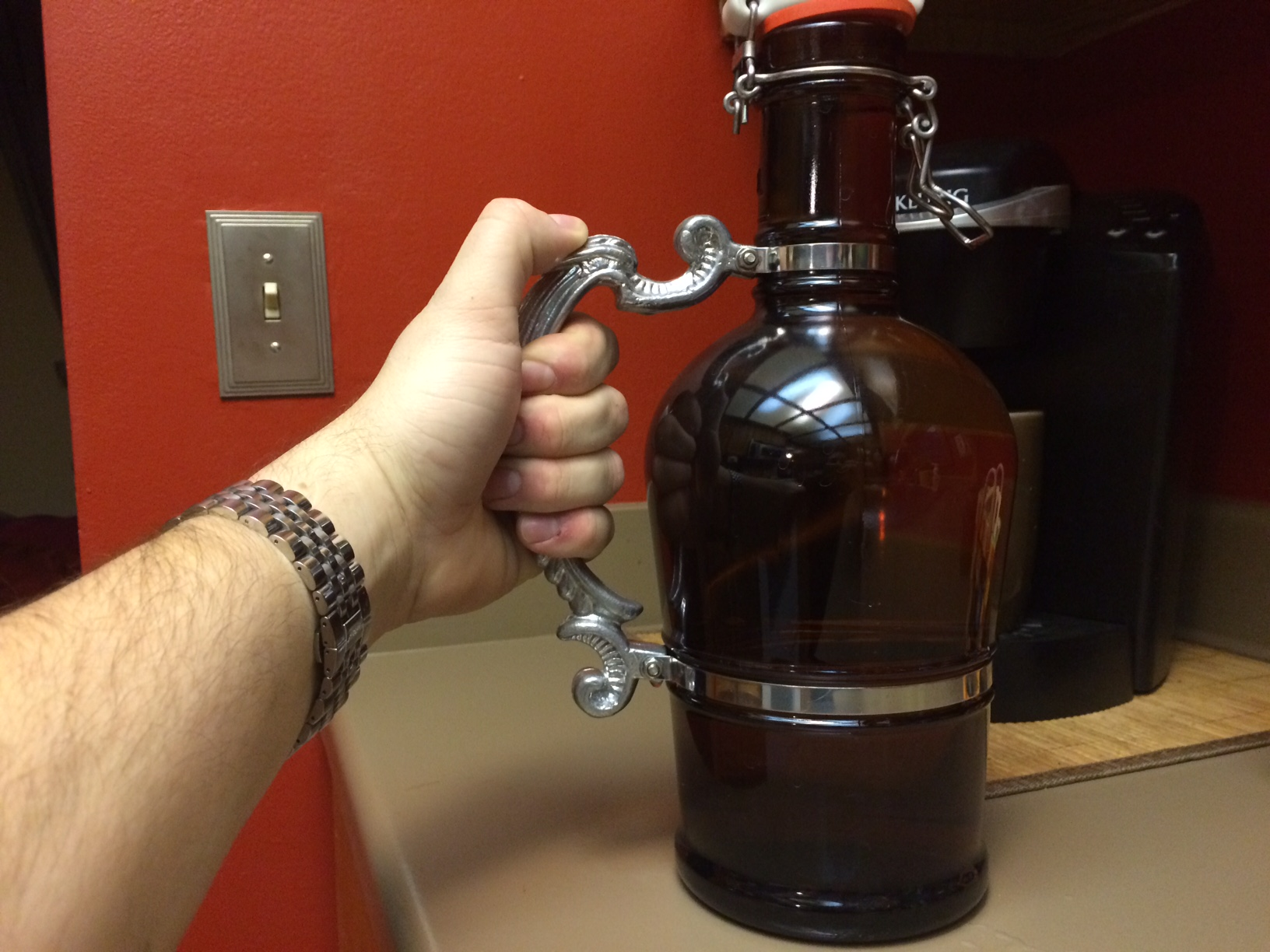
Growler of beer, a way to take home craft beer

OddPitch Brewing Company, in Missoula, opened in 2021. It is owned by Gabe Stinchfield and the head brewer is Jacob Principe. Their Oakilly Dokilly won the 2024 bronze award for Sour Ales/Wild Ales from the Montana Brewers Association. Black Fire won bronze in the Fruit, Vegetable, and Spiced Beer category.

=== Otium Brewing ===
Otium Brewing is in Miles City. Otium is a Latin word for leisure time for "self-realization activities". It is owned by Dustin and Hannah Strong.

=== Outlaw Brewing ===
Outlaw Brewing, formally Sheriff Henry Plummer's Outlaw Brewing, is in Bozeman. Plummer was a sheriff in the Montana Territory who some said was crooked and others thought was framed. Todd Hough is the brewer.

==== Awards ====
Beer	Category	Medal	Year	Bestower
The Capone	Oatmeal Stout	Silver	2022	North American Beer Awards
	Oatmeal Stout	Silver	2023	North American Beer Awards
Cowpoke Pale Ale	Pale Ales	Gold	2025	Montana Beer Awards
Double Trouble	Silver	2025	Montana Beer Awards	
Gambler Amber	Silver	2025	North American Beer Awards	
Hop Contusion	Hazy or Juicy India Pale Ale	Gold	2022	North American Beer Awards
Little Lueven	Saison	Silver	2025	North American Beer Awards
Patio Pounder	Session India Pale Ale	Bronze	2025	North American Beer Awards
Snow Crest	American-Style Pale Ale	Silver	2023	Great American Beer Festival

=== Palladium Draughthaus ===
Palladium Draughthaus is in Columbus. It is owned by Joe Morse I, Mina Morse, and Joseph Morse III. The name is in reference to Stillwater Mining Company, the only palladium producer in the U.S., whose smelter is located in Columbus.

=== Patriotic American Brewery ===
Patriotic American Brewery opened in Evergreen in 2023. It is owned by Josie and Matt Hegstad. The Patriot won the 2024 bronze award for Wheat Ales from the Montana Brewers Association. At the 2025 Montana Beer Awards Fire in the Hole! won bronze in the Vegetable and Spiced Beer category.

=== Philipsburg Brewing Company ===
Philipsburg Brewing Company, in Philipsburg, opened in August 2012. Their brewery, as well as a taproom, is located downtown. A second location is also in Philipsburg in the historic Kroger Brewery. It is owned by Cathy and Nolan Smith. Mike Elliott is the head brewer.

Awards
Beer	Category	Medal	Year	Bestower
	Community Impact Award		2024	Montana Brewers Association
5 Phantoms Pumpkin Spiced Barleywine	Pumpkin or Pumpkin Spiced Beer	Gold	2016	North American Beer Awards
	Pumpkin Beer	Bronze	2016	Great American Beer Festival
	Pumpkin Beer	Bronze	2017	Great American Beer Festival
	Pumpkin or Pumpkin Spiced Beers, Herbed/Spiced	Gold	2017	North American Beer Awards
	Pumpkin Beer	Bronze	2018	Great American Beer Festival
	Pumpkin Beer	Gold	2018	World Beer Cup
	Pumpkin Beer	Gold	2018	U.S. Open Beer Championship
	Pumpkin Beer	Gold	2022	World Beer Cup
	Pumpkin Beer	Silver	2022	Great American Beer Festival
5 Phantoms 2018	Pumpkin Beer	Silver	2019	U.S. Open Beer Championship
	Pumpkin Beer	Silver	2020	Great American Beer Festival
5 Phantoms	Pumpkin or Pumpkin Spiced Beers	Gold	2025	North American Beer Awards
Chardonnay Barrel Aged Saison	Barrel-Aged Beer	Gold	2019	North American Beer Awards
False Idols	European Light Lagers	Gold	2024	Montana Brewers Association
	Malt-forward European Pale Lagers	Silver	2025	Montana Beer Awards
Flint Creek Common	California Common	Silver	2016	North American Beer Awards
	California Common	Bronze	2019	North American Beer Awards
Forager	Smoke & Wood Flavored Beer	Silver	2025	Montana Beer Awards
Haybag Hefeweizen	Hefeweizen	Silver	2013	North American Beer Awards
	American-Style Wheat Beer with yeast	Silver	2016	World Beer Cup
	Hefeweizen	Silver	2016	North American Beer Awards
	American Specialty Wheat	Bronze	2019	U.S. Open Beer Championship
	Wheat Ales	Bronze	2025	Montana Beer Awards
Hygge Baltic Porter	Baltic-Style Porter	Gold	2019	North American Beer Awards
	Baltic-Style Porter	Gold	2019	U.S. Open Beer Championship
Otter Water Summer Pale Ale	Light Ale	Gold	2015	North American Beer Awards
	Light Ale	Bronze	2016	North American Beer Awards
	Light Ale	Gold	2017	North American Beer Awards
	Light Ale	Gold	2019	North American Beer Awards
	Light Ales/Hybrid	Silver	2024	Montana Brewers Association
Robe Swing Saison	Saison	Gold	2017	North American Beer Awards
Swimming Hole	Belgian & French-style Ales	Gold	2025	Montana Beer Awards

=== Pleasant Prairie Brewing ===
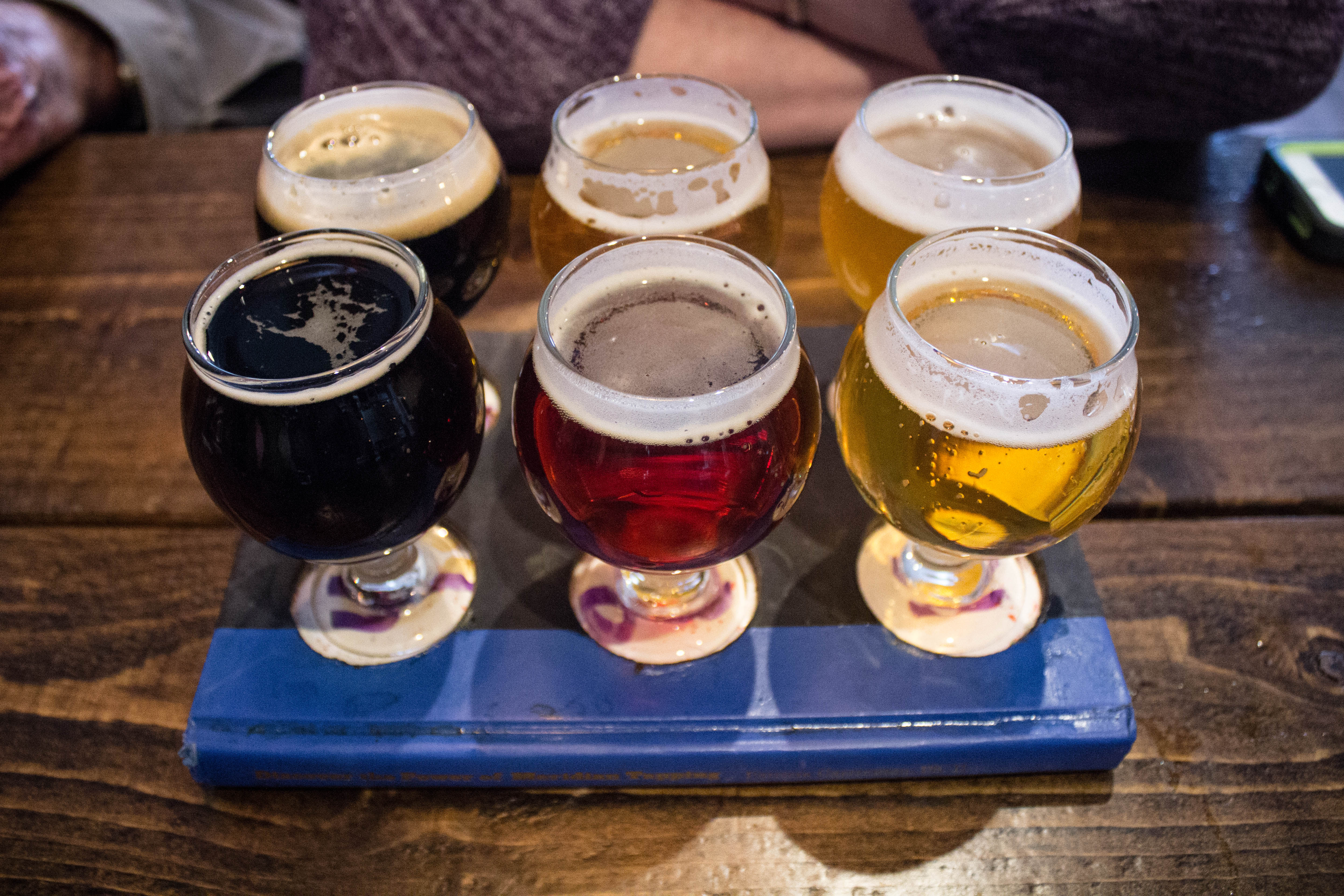
A variety of beer styles

Pleasant Prairie Brewing opened in Scobey in 2022. It is owned by Ben and Kara Fosland.

=== Quarry Brewing ===
Quarry was opened in Butte in 2007. In 2010 they moved to The Grand Hotel. In 2024 the original owners retired and Kris Mihelich took over ownership. They have seven staples on tap and regularly rotate seasonals.

=== Red Lodge Ales Brewing Company ===
Red Lodge Ales Brewing Company, in Red Lodge, opened in 1998. It is owned by Sam Hoffmann.

The brewery produced nearly 8,000 barrels in 2014, boasts the largest solar thermal array in the state, and distributes to multiple states.

Awards
Beer	Category	Medal	Year	Bestower
Bent Nail IPA	American-Style Strong Pale Ale	Bronze	2007	Great American Beer Festival
Czechmate Pilsner	Bohemian-Style Pilsner	Gold	2013	North American Beer Awards
	Bohemain-Style Pilsner	Bronze	2017	North American Beer Awards
Dos Goatees Doppelbock	Doppelbock	Gold	2015	North American Beer Awards
	Doppelbock	Gold	2019	North American Beer Awards
Glacier Ale	Altbier	Gold	2010	North American Beer Awards
	Altbier	Bronze	2012	North American Beer Awards
	Altbier	Bronze	2015	North American Beer Awards
	Altbier	Silver	2016	North American Beer Awards
	German-Style Altbier	Gold	2017	Great American Beer Awards
	Altbier	Gold	2021	North American Beer Awards
	Altbier	Gold	2023	North American Beer Awards
	Altbier	Silver	2024	North American Beer Awards
Helio Hefeweizen	Hefeweizen, Dark Hefeweizen	Silver	2012	North American Beer Awards
	American-Style Wheat Beer with yeast	Bronze	2013	Great American Beer Festival
	Hefeweizen	Gold	2015	North American Beer Awards
	American-Style Hefeweizen	Bronze	2021	North American Beer Awards
Jack's Scottish Ale	Scottish-Style Export	Bronze	2013	North American Beer Awards
Johnston Ale	American-Style Dark Hefeweizen	Gold	2021	North American Beer Awards
Liver Eatin' Ale	Dark Hefeweizen	Bronze	2016	North American Beer Awards
	American-Style Hefeweizen, Dark Hefeweizen	Silver	2017	North American Beer Awards
	American-Style Dark Wheat Ale	Gold	2018	North American Beer Awards
Red Lodge Hefeweizen	American Wheat Beers	Gold	2010	North American Beer Awards
Red Lodge Porter	Robust Porter	Gold	2011	North American Beer Awards
	Robust Porter	Silver	2012	North American Beer Awards
	Robust Porter	Silver	2013	North American Beer Awards
Red Lodge Reserve	German-Style Kolsch/Koln-Style Kolsch	Bronze	1999	Great American Beer Festival
Reserve Ale	Kolsch	Gold	2012	North American Beer Awards
Resurrection Doppel Bock	Doppel Bock	Silver	2011	North American Beer Awards
	German-Style Doppelbock or Eisbock	Bronze	2012	Great American Beer Festival
	German-Style Doppelbock or Eisbock	Bronze	2013	Great American Beer Festival
Summer Daze	Weizen Bock	Silver	2013	North American Beer Awards
	Dunkelweizen/Weizen Bock	Gold	2016	North American Beer Awards
	Dunkelweizen/Weizen Bock	Silver	2017	North American Beer Awards
	Dunkelweizen/Weizen Bock	Silver	2021	North American Beer Awards

=== Ronan Cooperative Brewery ===
The Ronan Cooperative Brewery, in Ronan, opened in 2017. As a cooperative, there are multiple owners. Their Schwartz Lake Schwarzbier won the 2024 gold award for Amber and Dark Lagers from the Montana Brewers Association. Mud Lake Dunkles Bock won the bronze award in Strong Lagers. In 2025 their Hellroaring Helles won the Malt-forward European Pale Lagers category and the Garden Wall Vienna Lager took bronze in the Amber & Dark Lagers at the Montana Beer Awards.

=== Ruby Valley Brew ===
Ruby Valley Brew is located in Sheridan. It is owned by Amanda LaYacona.

=== Sacred Waters Brewing Company ===
Sacred Waters Brewing Company is in Kalispell. It is owned by Jordan and Kirk Gentry. The head brewer is Seth Orr.

==== Awards ====
Beer	Category	Medal	Year	Bestower
The Bob IPA	India Pale Ales	Gold	2024	Montana Brewers Association
Lil Salmon Fire	Chili Beer	Gold	2021	North American Beer Awards
	Chili Beer	Gold	2022	North American Beer Awards
	Chili Beer	Gold	2024	North American Beer Awards
	Vegetable and Spiced Beers	Gold	2025	Montana Beer Awards
	Chili Beer	Silver	2025	North American Beer Awards
Meadow Creek Amber	Irish-Style Red Ale	Gold	2022	North American Beer Awards
Raft Soda	Other Hoppy Lager	Gold	2025	North American Beer Awards
Snow Dust	Asian-Style Lager	Gold	2024	North American Beer Awards
	American & International Pale Lagers	Bronze	2025	Montana Beer Awards
	International Light Lager	Bronze	2025	World Beer Cup

=== Sawdust & Steel Brewing ===
Sawdust & Steel Brewing, in Three Forks, is owned by Cody and Kari Ham. The brewery opened in 2023. Their American Dunkel won the 2024 silver award for Wheat Ales from Montana Brewers Association. Fuzzy Wuzzy Was a Beer took bronze in the Experimental Beers category. They also placed at the 2024 North American Beer Awards with gold for Stud Stacker in Dry Stout and silver for Bridgemaster Brown Ale in American-Style Brown Ale. At the 2025 North American Beer Awards Punch List won gold in Specialty, Historical and Experimental Beers.

=== Smelter City Brewing Company ===
Smelter City Brewing Company is located in Anaconda. It is owned by Luke Carlson and was opened in 2017. Their Table Farmhouse won the 2024 silver award for Belgian and French Style Ales from the Montana Brewers Association. Just Hipster Enough also won silver in the Experimental Beers category. At the 2025 Montana Beer Awards the Lemonade Stand Lager took gold in the Fruit Beers category. Raspberry Lemon Tart Cake won bronze in the Sour Ales, Wild Ales, and Fruited Sour Ales category.

=== Speakeasy 41 Brewing Company ===
Speakeasy 41 Brewing Company, in Helena, is owned by Adam Hutchinson, Jaramia Bunker, and Scott Hansing. They also own Missouri River Brewing in East Helena.

=== SunRift Beer Company ===
SunRift Beer Company has two locations, Kalispell and Whitefish. The original location in Kalispell opened in 2018. It is owned by husband and wife Craig and Megan Koontz, and brothers Jerry and Dave Stevens. Justin Olson is the head brewer. The brewery is named after Sunrift Gorge in Glacier National Park.

=== Tamarack Brewing ===
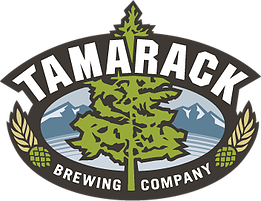
Tamarack Brewing Company logo

Tamarack Brewing Company, in Lakeside, opened in 2007. A Missoula brewpub opened in 2011. Their Old Stache Porter won the Smoke and Wood Flavored Beer category at the 2025 Montana Beer Awards.

Tamarack Brewing was co-founded by former professional ice hockey player (and Hockey Hall of Fame inductee) Lanny McDonald.

=== Ten Mile Creek Brewery ===
Ten Mile Creek Brewery is in Helena. It is owned by Jordan Keltz, Ethan Kohoutek, and Riley Tubbs. The brewery opened in 2015. Their Fanny Pack Amber Lager won the 2024 silver award for Amber and Dark Lagers from the Montana Brewers Association.

=== Thirsty Street Brewing Company ===
Thirsty Street Brewing Company is located in Billings. Once with two locations in Billings, as of 2024 they operate only at "The Garage".

==== Awards ====
Beer	Category	Medal	Year	Bestower
Bears Delight	American-Style Hefeweizen Dark Hefeweizen	Bronze	2024	North American Beer Awards
Big Bison	Stout	Silver	2022	Great American Beer Festival
	Foreign-Style Stout	Bronze	2023	North American Beer Awards
	Brown and Black Ales	Silver	2024	Montana Brewers Association
Good Times	Belgian-Style Pale Strong Ale	Silver	2024	North American Beer Awards
Hopster Doofus	Hazy Pale Ales	Silver	2024	Montana Brewers Association
Melba Sour Ale	Wood- and Barrel-Aged Sour or Brett Beer	Bronze	2019	North American Beer Awards
Shining Mountain	Golden or Blonde Ale	Bronze	2022	North American Beer Awards
	Golden Ale	Silver	2024	North American Beer Awards

=== Tilt Würks ===
Tilt Würks is in Miles City.

=== Triple Dog Brewing Company ===
Triple Dog Brewing Company opened in Havre in 2014. It is owned by Erin and Michael Garrity. Their Watermelon Lime won the 2024 silver award for Alternative Products from Montana Brewers Association. In 2025 the Ginger Lime Pear took bronze in Alternative Products at the Montana Beer Awards.

=== Überbrew ===
Überbrew is in Billings. Mark Hastings is the head brewer.

Awards
Beer	Category	Medal	Year	Bestower
Alpha Force		Bronze	2016	Great American Beer Festival
Alpha Force Double Tap	Cascadian Style Dark Ale	Gold	2016	North American Beer Awards
	American-Style Black Ale	Gold	2018	Great American Beer Festival
	American-Style Black Ale	Gold	2019	Great American Beer Festival
Alt 0220	Altbier	Silver	2013	North American Beer Awards
Average at Best	Double Red Ale	Silver	2016	Great American Beer Festival
Black Hops Tactical IPA	American-Style Black Ale	Silver	2014	Great American Beer Festival
The Bruce	Scotch Ale	Silver	2020	Great American Beer Festival
Canu	American Cream Ale	Bronze	2017	U.S. Open Beer Championship
	Cream Ale	Gold	2017	North American Beer Awards
	American-Style Cream Ale	Silver	2017	Great American Beer Festival
	Cream Ale	Bronze	2019	North American Beer Awards
	Double/Imperial India Pale Ale	Silver	2016	North American Beer Awards
Dirty Little Sticke	Altbier	Bronze	2015	U.S. Open Beer Championship
Grandmaster SMaSH Chinook	Session Beer IPA	Gold	2016	North American Beer Awards
Humulus Insani	Imperial India Pale Ale	Gold	2016	Great American Beer Festival
Let'r Buck	English Mild Ale	Bronze	2022	U.S. Open Beer Championship
Limited Release Brown	English-Style Mild Ale	Gold	2022	North American Beer Awards
Wampa	Hybrid Style Beer	Gold	2013	North American Beer Awards
White Noise	Hefeweizen	Gold	2013	North American Beer Awards
		Gold	2016	Great American Beer Festival
	American Wheat Beer	Silver	2021	Great American Beer Festival
	American Wheat Beer	Gold	2022	Great American Beer Festival
Uberspezial	Vienna-Style Lager	Silver	2019	North American Beer Awards

=== Wildwood Brewing ===
Wildwood Brewing Company opened in Stevensville in 2012. It is owned by Jim and Pannha Lueders.

=== Yellowstone Beer Company ===
Yellowstone Beer Company is located in West Yellowstone. They opened in 2023.

== Defunct ==
Though Montana had a robust early brewery history, many notable companies were severely weakened by Prohibition and others finished off by the expansion of national breweries.

=== Anaconda ===
- Anaconda Brewing Company - 1900–1958

=== Butte ===
- Tivoli Brewery

=== Helena ===
- Kessler Brewing Company - 1865–1958; 1984–2000

=== Kalispell ===
- Kalispell Malting and Brewing Company - 1893–1955

=== Whitefish ===
- Great Northern Brewing Company - 1995–2020

== Montana Brewers Association (MBA) ==
The Montana Brewers Association was founded in 2008.
Its previous name was the Montana State Brewers Association, established in 1997.

Its purpose is the promotion of the production and sales of the freshest and highest quality Montana-made beers through education, public awareness and support for local breweries' products, profession, and histories, while documenting their economic impact and legal responsibilities throughout the state.

In 2024, the MBA implemented the Montana Beer Awards. Montana breweries could win gold, silver and bronze medals in 19 categories. There were 365 beers entered from 55 breweries. In 2025 they recognized 22 beer categories. The number of beers was 344 from 49 breweries.

== A Drink in Every Hand ==
A Drink in Every Hand uses personal experience, knowledge, and relationships with breweries, wineries, cideries, distilleries, and other locations across Montana to serve up the most current information. This website provides a map plus lists of craft alcohol creators.

== Legal information ==
Definitions

According to the Montana Code Annotated 2009, section 16-1-106:

(5) (a) "Beer" means:

(i) a malt beverage containing not more than 8.75% of alcohol by volume; or
(ii) an alcoholic beverage containing not more than 14% alcohol by volume:

(A) that is made by the alcoholic fermentation of an infusion or decoction, or a combination of both, in potable brewing water, of malted cereal grain; and
(B) in which the sugars used for fermentation of the alcoholic beverage are at least 75% derived from malted cereal grain measured as a percentage of the total dry weight of the fermentable ingredients.

(b) The term does not include a caffeinated or stimulant-enhanced malt beverage.

and section 16-3-213, Brewers or beer importers not to retail beer—small brewery exceptions:

(2) (a) For the purposes of this section, a "small brewery" is a brewery that has an annual nationwide production of not less than 100 barrels or more than 10,000 barrels. (b) A small brewery may, at one location for each brewery license, provide samples of beer that were brewed and fermented on the premises in a sample room located on the licensed premises. The samples may be provided with or without charge between the hours of 10 a.m. and 8 p.m. No more than 48 ounces of malt beverage may be sold or given to each individual customer during a business day.

Licensing
The roots of Montana's liquor licensing system date back to 1933, when Prohibition ended and taverns sprung up throughout the state. In 1947, the state enacted a quota system, allowing one tavern for every 1,500 residents of a city. However, the taverns in existence at the time were grandfathered in, and what the state considers to be an excess of liquor licenses now exists in Montana cities.

== See also ==
- Beer in the United States
- List of breweries in the United States
- List of microbreweries
