= Missoula station =

Missoula station may refer to:

- Missoula station (Northern Pacific Railway), a former Northern Pacific and Amtrak station in Missoula, Montana
- Missoula station (Milwaukee Road), a former Milwaukee Road station in Missoula, Montana
