= Daniel E. Bandmann =

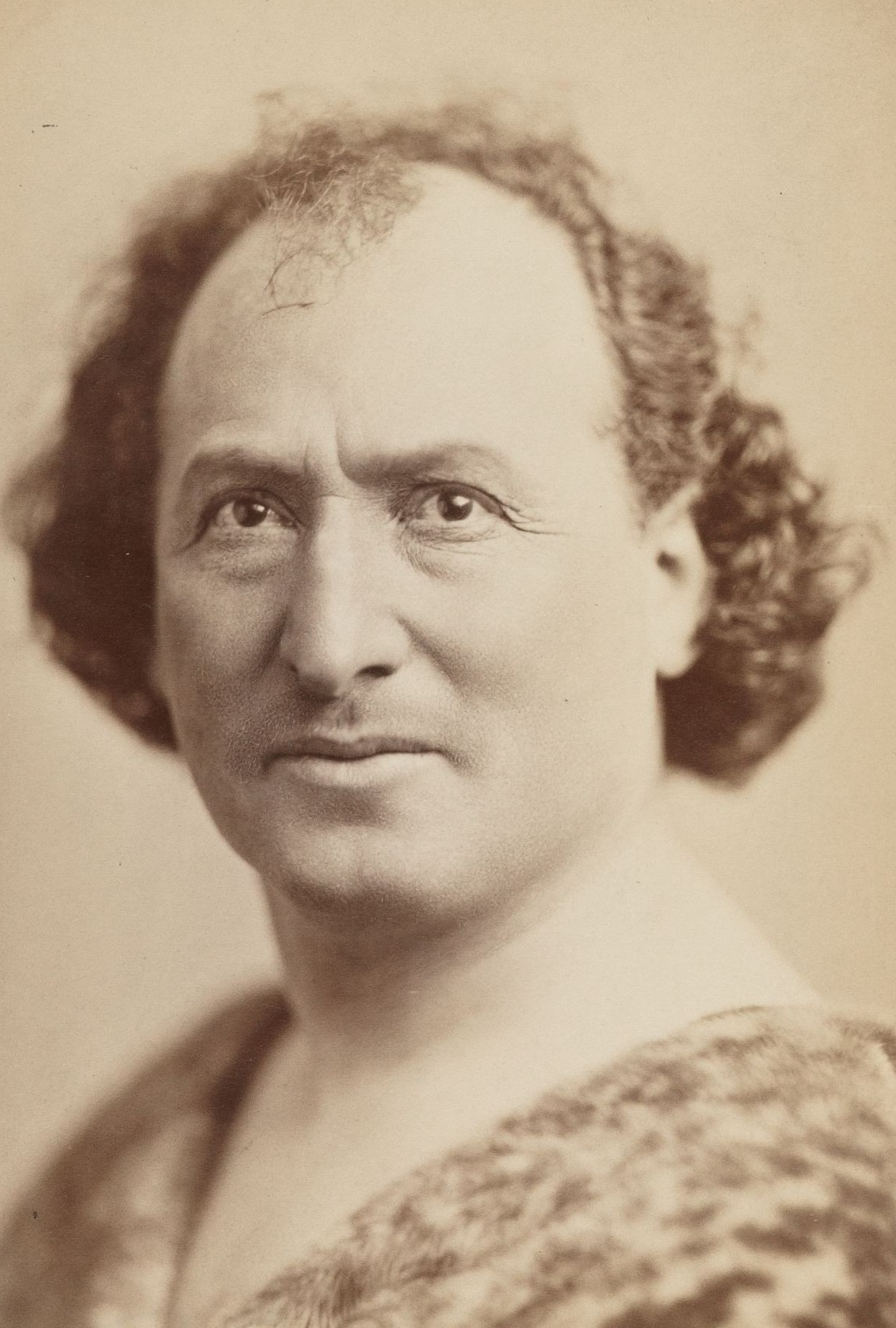
- Born: Daniel Edward Bandmann; November 1, 1837; Cassel (today Kassel), Germany
- Died: November 23, 1905 (aged 68); Hell Gate Canyon, Missoula County, Montana, U.S.
- Occupations: Actor, rancher, pomologist

Daniel Edward Bandmann (November 1, 1837 – November 23, 1905) was an internationally known German-born American Shakespearean actor who after retiring from the stage became a noted Montana rancher and pomologist.

In 1885, Bandmann published An Actor's Tour: or, Seventy Thousand Miles with Shakespeare, chronicling his repertoire company's nearly four-year tour of the Asia-Pacific region over the early 1880s. Bandmann was later credited for introducing McIntosh red apples for cultivation in western Montana.

== Early life ==
The son of Solomon and Rebecca, Daniel Edward Bandmann was born in Cassel (now Kassel), a city in the Grand Duchy of Hesse. He first came to the United States in 1852 where at some point he became involved with German amateur theatre productions at New York's Stadt Theatre.

During this time, he reportedly attended the Cooper Institute where he studied English under Alexander Graham Bell. This is questionable since Bell was nearly ten years younger than Bandmann and did not come to America until much later. As an American citizen, Bandmann returned to Germany in 1858 and shortly thereafter made his professional stage debut at the Court Theatre in Neustrelitz. Later, with the sponsorship of the Grand Duchess of Mecklenburg, Bandmann embarked on a successful series of mostly Shakespearean productions staged in Germany, Prussia and Austria.

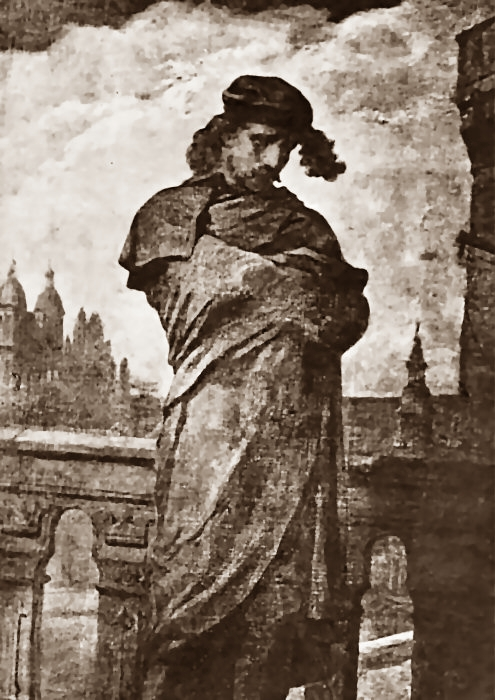
Bandmann as Hamlet by William M. Hunt

== Theatrical career ==
In November 1861 Bandmann returned to New York where on January 15, 1863, he was well received in his English-language debut at Niblo's Garden as Shylock. Soon his Hamlet gained considerable attention from critics for his introduction of several innovations from German theatre, such as bringing his Ghost up from beneath the stage with leaves twitching to and fro matching Hamlet's anxiety. On September 1, 1863, Bandmann appeared at Niblo's in the first performance in New York of John Guido Methua's adaptation from the German of Emil Brachvogel, entitled Narcisse: or, The Last of the Pompadours. Soon afterward Bandmann began a five-year tour of North America principally in the roles of Hamlet, Shylock, Othello, logo, Gloucester, Macbeth, Benedict, and Narcisse.

Bandmann made his first appearance in Britain at London's Lyceum Theatre on February 17, 1868, in Narcisse. Over the following decade Bandmann would embark on tours visiting a number of the principal cities in Australia, New Zealand, the Hawaiian Islands, North America and Great Britain. During this period he performed in front of King Kamehameha V, Brigham Young, and Queen Victoria. Bandmann's most ambitious tour sailed from San Francisco late in 1879 and did not return until January 1884, after staging nearly 700 performances in Tasmania, New Zealand, Australia, the Malay Peninsula, China, India, and Hawaii.

Bandmann first married Anne Herschel, a native of Davenport, Iowa, on June 22, 1865. His second marriage, in February 1869, was to the British actress Millicent or Melicent Farmer, daughter of Nehemiah Frederick Farmer and Elizabeth Hodgson. Millicent, stage name Milly Palmer (1845–1926), starred in his London production of Narcisse, and is mentioned in James Joyce's Ulysses for her "impersonation" of Prince Hamlet. This union ended a few years later after their Pacific and North American tours and the birth of a daughter and son. Bandmann then had a long relationship with the young Canadian actress Louise Beaudet, a member of his 1879 Asia-Pacific tour. Though it's unclear whether the two ever married, after his marriage to actress Mary Therese Kelly in the early 1890s, Bandmann was obligated to compensate Beaudet to avoid a messy court entanglement. With Mary Kelly, Bandmann had four children born between 1892 and 1905.

== Later life ==
In 1887 Bandmann purchased two ranches near the abandoned settlement of Hell Gate, not far from Missoula, Montana. Though new to ranching, Bandmann would co-found the Montana Board of Horticulture and introduce to the area McIntosh red apples, Percheron horses, Holstein cattle, and exotic breeds of chickens and pigs. Today the site of his property is called Bandmann Flats and hosts a golf club.

In the 1890's, after constructing a toll bridge that allows for easier access through his estate, a problem arose when the Indians from the Flathead Indian reservation, who pass through the area regularly, started to poach his chicken (which were of a special breed). He put on costume and put his thespian skills in action and after a performance that unnerved the Indians, he threatened, or pretended, to get his shotgun, knowing full well that he did not want to start a conflict with the Indians. "Words have saved my kingdom, where the shotgun would have failed.", he said after successfully executing his scare tactics.

== Death ==
Bandmann died suddenly at his Montana ranch on November 23, 1905, aged 68, just a few months after the birth of his last child, and was laid to rest at the Missoula Cemetery.

Maurice Edward Bandmann (1872–1922), Daniel's son by Millicent Farmer, whom he had wed on February 9, 1869, later became a theatrical impresario credited with building several theatres throughout the Far East. Maurice died in Gibraltar around age 50.
