= Mount Sentinel =

Mountain in Montana, United States

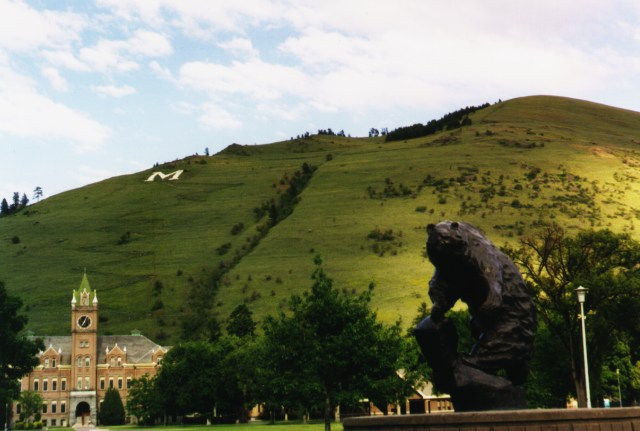
- Mount Sentinel with University of Montana Campus in the foreground.

Highest point
- Elevation: 5,158 ft (1,572 m)
- Prominence: 118 ft (36 m)
- Coordinates: 46°51′09″N 113°57′48″W

Geography
- Location within Montana
- Location: Missoula County, Montana, U.S.
- Parent range: Sapphire Mountains
- Topo map: USGS Southeast Missoula

Mount Sentinel, originally known as "Mount Woody," is a small mountain located immediately east of the University of Montana in Missoula, Montana. At a height of 1,958 feet and an elevation of 5,158 feet (1,572 m), Mount Sentinel also features the hillside letter "M", a large concrete structure 620 feet (189 m) up its western face.

== History ==
The University of Montana first received land on Mount Sentinel in 1902 when the Northern Pacific Railroad Company donated 40 acres at the foot and up the slope of the mountain. The U.S. Congress later turned over many acres of Mount Sentinel so that campus extended up the slope to the crest of the mountain, making the University of Montana the only university in the nation to own a mountain. In 2000, the city of Missoula also purchased 475 acres along the face of Mount Sentinel.

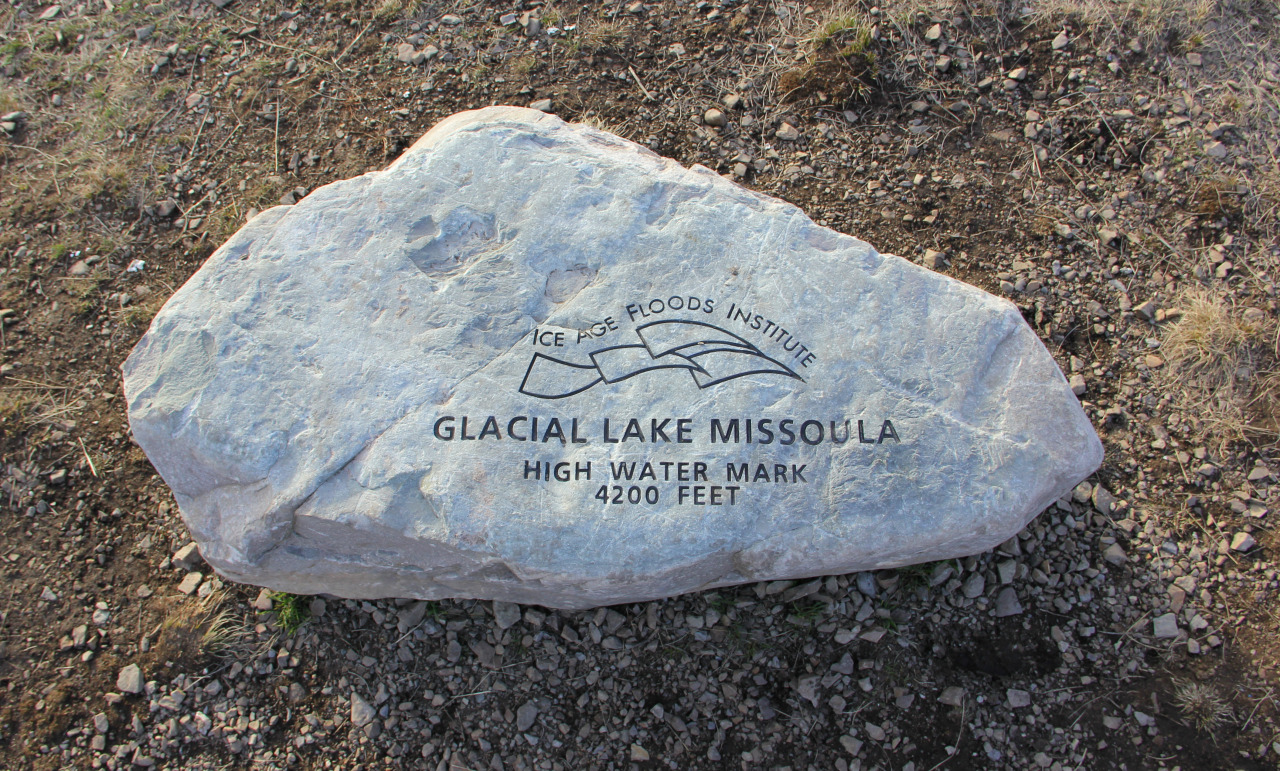
Glacial Lake Missoula

Glacial Lake Missoula

Between 15,000 and 13,000 years ago, a Pleistocene Ice Age glacier moved through the Purcell Trench in northern Idaho, damming the Clark Fork River. This glacial dam created Glacial Lake Missoula, a lake larger than Lake Erie and Lake Ontario combined. As the lake continued to grow, pressure increased on the glacial dam, ultimately causing the dam to fail. Water from the lake rushed westward at speeds between 30 and 50 miles per hour across Montana, Idaho, and Washington. The violent flow created by the draining of Glacial Lake Missoula left shoreline marks that are still visible on the face of Mount Sentinel and Mount Jumbo, a neighboring mountain to the north.

== The "M" ==
History

The first trail up Mount Sentinel to the area that the "M" would later occupy was cut by forestry students in 1908. In 1909, the junior class constructed the first "M" at the top of that trail with whitewashed rocks. In 1912, the freshman class constructed a small white "M" of wood. This "M" stood upright on the face of the mountain and cost $18 to build. The wooden "M" was destroyed by wind in 1914, replaced, and then wrecked by wind again. In 1915, a new "M" made of whitewashed rocks was constructed 200 feet above the original "M" site. A concrete "M" measuring 125-by-100-feet was built in 1968 at a cost of $4,328. The concrete structure was built because it was no longer feasible to maintain the old, rock "M". This concrete "M" is still located on Mt. Sentinel today.

Tradition

Between 1915 and 1968, while the "M" was composed of whitewashed rocks, freshman boys hiked the trail to the "M" each year to apply a fresh coat of white-wash. The tradition ended with the construction of the cement "M".

Starting in 1919, freshman boys hiked the trail to the "M" during homecoming and lit the outline with railroad lanterns. This tradition continues today, with UM Advocates making the hike each year at homecoming to light the "M".

Each year, during Native American Awareness Week, a sunrise ceremony is held at the base of the "M" where traditional Salish Morning and Honor Songs are sung.

== Preservation ==
The University of Montana natural areas weed manager organizes an annual herbicide application on Mount Sentinel. There is also an annual community weed pull on the mountain. The Forest Service handles weed control for the 441 acres of Mount Sentinel that it owns.

In 2006, outdoor retail co-op REI, which gave away $1 million in grants to nonprofit groups dedicated to preservation of community parks, awarded a $10,000 grant to Friends of Missoula Parks for use on improvements to Mount Sentinel.

After a fire in 2008, the conservation lands manager for the city of Missoula and a University of Montana natural areas specialist teamed up to spread native grass and flower seeds over the area of Mount Sentinel that was burned.

In the fall of 2010, the University of Montana Student Guild of the Society for Ecological Restoration teamed up with Run Wild Missoula and other volunteers to help restore the "M" trail. The group added gravel to the path, reseeded barren areas, blocked unwanted side trails, and added more steps to the eighth switchback.

== Activism ==
In 2005, students of Missoula's Hellgate High School staked a 50-by-20-foot red ribbon next to the "M". The ribbon was installed as part of an annual Hellgate event called Red Ribbon Week that focuses on staying drug-free.

In 2010, local environmental activists added a white "350" made of tarps next to the "M" on Mount Sentinel. The display was organized as a part of the 350.org organization's 10-10-10 Global Work Parties effort. Over 7,000 work parties worldwide did projects to decrease carbon and heighten the awareness within political circles in order to slow climate change.

== Fires ==
Mount Sentinel has a long history of fires, dating back to at least 1930 when the Montana Kaimin reported a grass blaze.

More recently, over 300 acres on Mount Sentinel's west slope, directly above the University of Montana campus, burned in July 2008.

At least 20 acres also burned in July 2006.

On August 20, 2020, a 25 acre grass fire was started on the West face by two children playing with a lighter

== Trails ==
- Kim Williams Nature Trail runs along the Clark Fork River at the base of Mount Sentinel.
- Hellgate Canyon Trail runs from the base of Mount Sentinel at Kim Williams Nature Trail all the way to the peak of the mountain.
- Mo Z Trail runs from Pattee Canyon Road and the UM Golf Course area up to the Sentinel Fire Road and Pengelly Ridge Trail.
- Pengelly Ridge Trail runs from the ending of the Mo Z Trail up to the peak of Mount Sentinel.
- Crooked Trail runs from the end of Mo Z Trail east along the back side of the mountain.
- The "M" Trail is a switchback trail that runs from the base of Mount Sentinel at the University of Montana campus up to the famous "M".
- The Sentinel Fire Road is also a popular trail for hikers and walkers. Owned by the city of Missoula and open to the public, this road runs from the end of the Mo Z Trail up to the "M".

== Flora and fauna ==
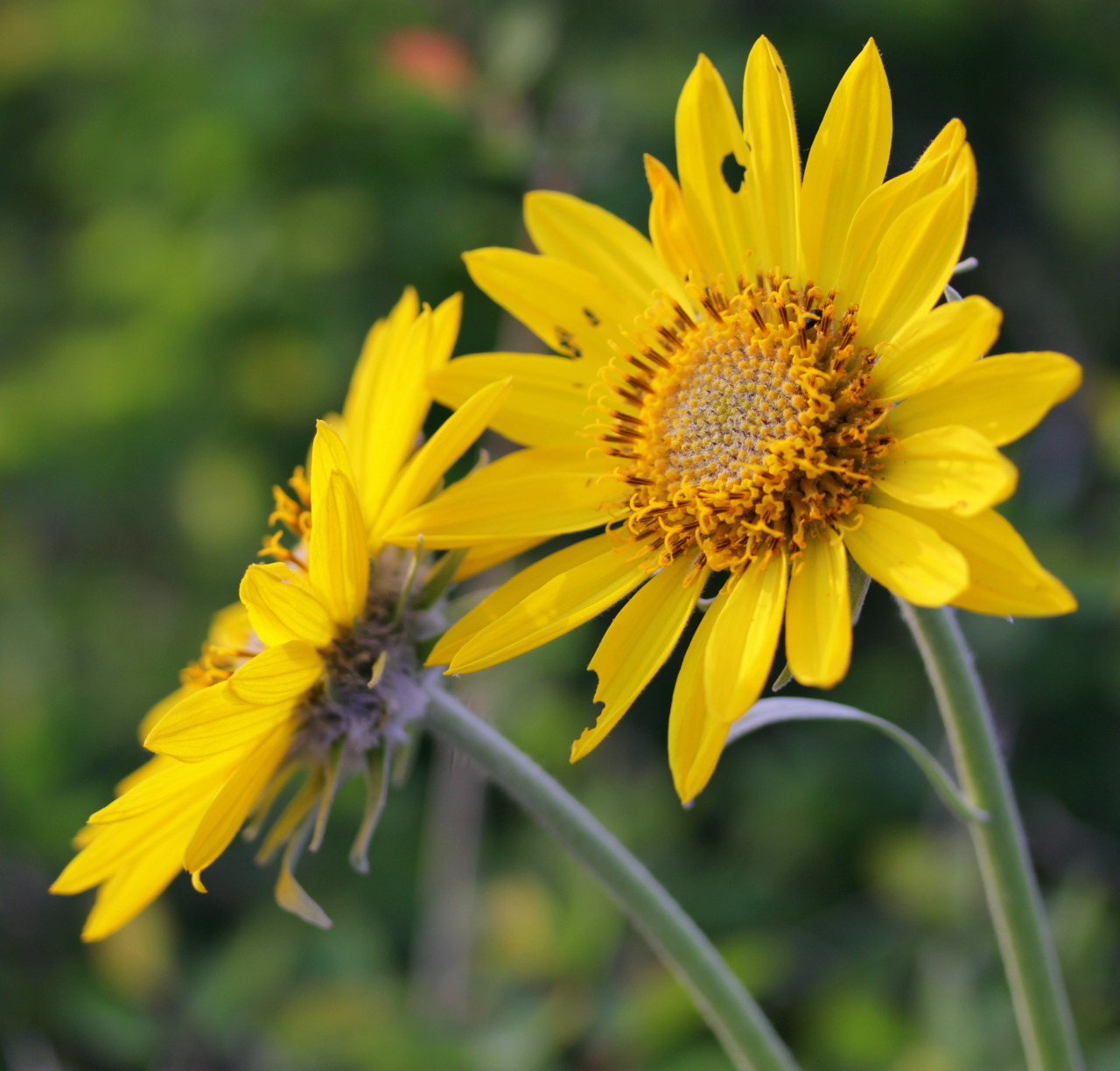
arrowleaf balsamroot

While largely barren, the flora of Mount Sentinel includes bitterroot plant, balsam root, paintbrush, prairie smoke, penstemons, Ponderosa pine and Douglas fir as well as invasive weeds like knapweed, cheatgrass, leafy spurge and Dalmatian toadflax. Fauna of the mountain includes whitetail deer, mule deer, falcons, and even black bears.

== Bibliography ==
- Cohen, Stan; Miller, Don (2004). The University of Montana, Missoula: A Pictorial History. Missoula, MT: Pictorial Histories Publishing Co., Inc. ISBN 978-1-57510-104-0.
