= Missoula, Montana =

Missoula
- City
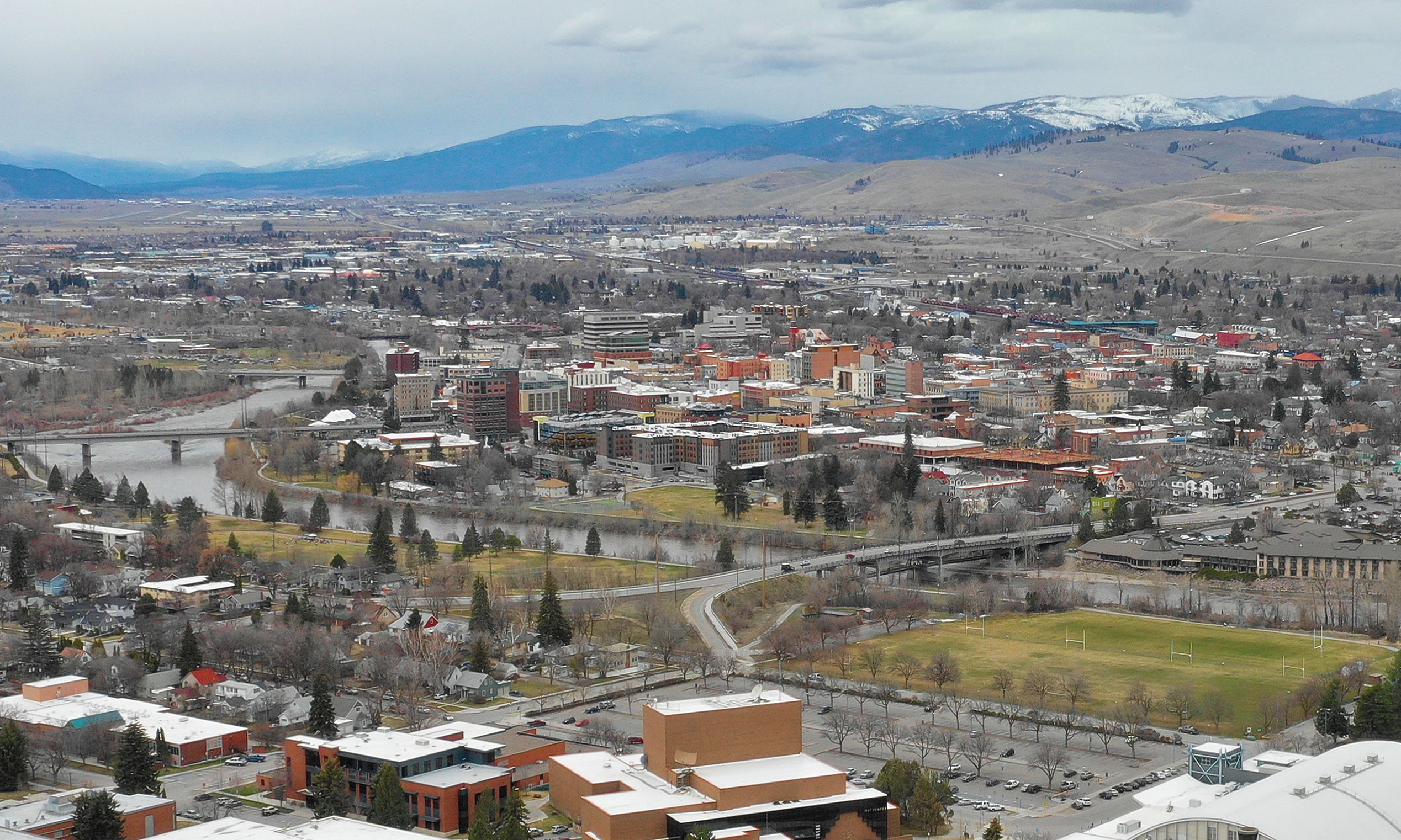
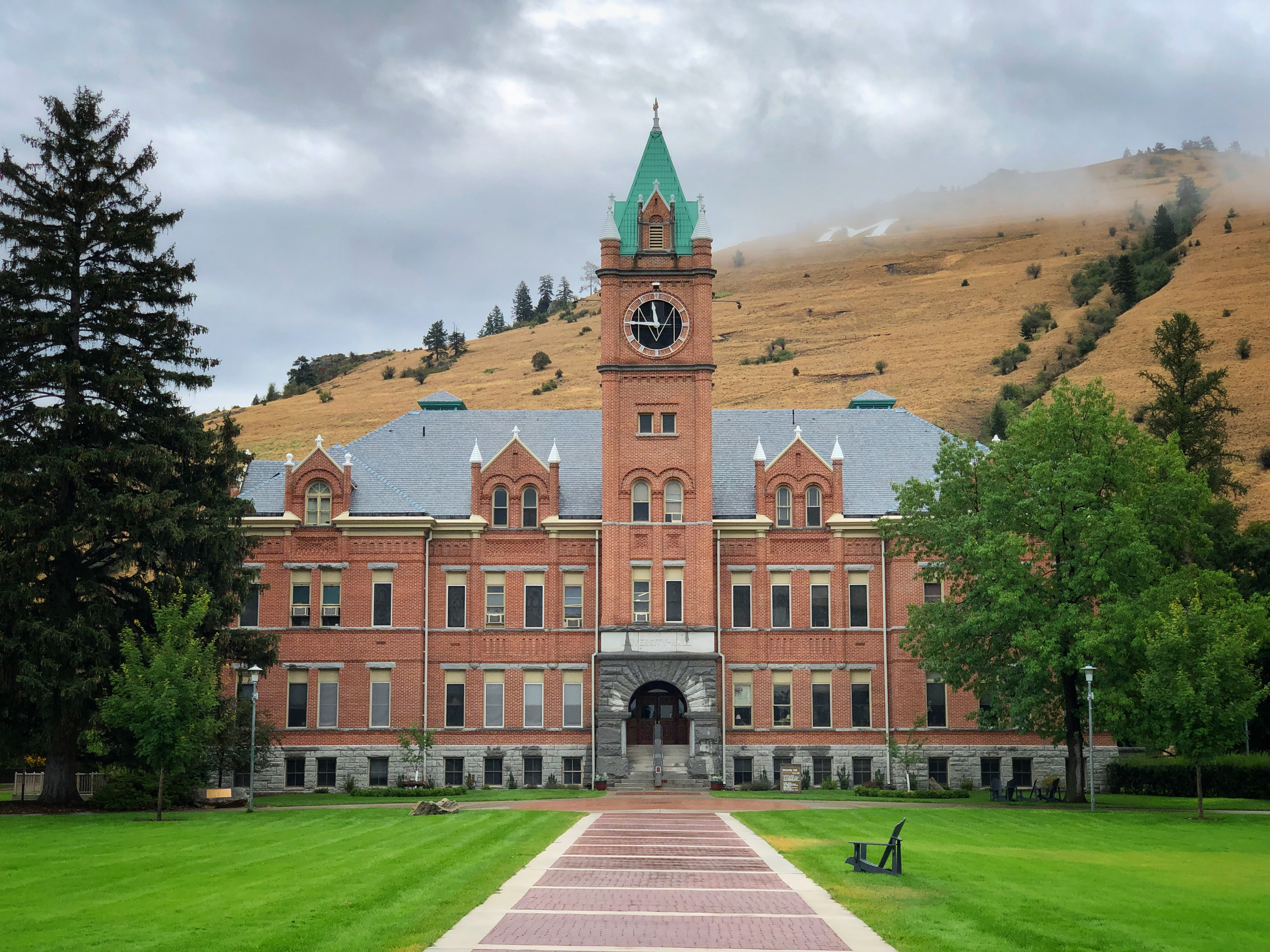
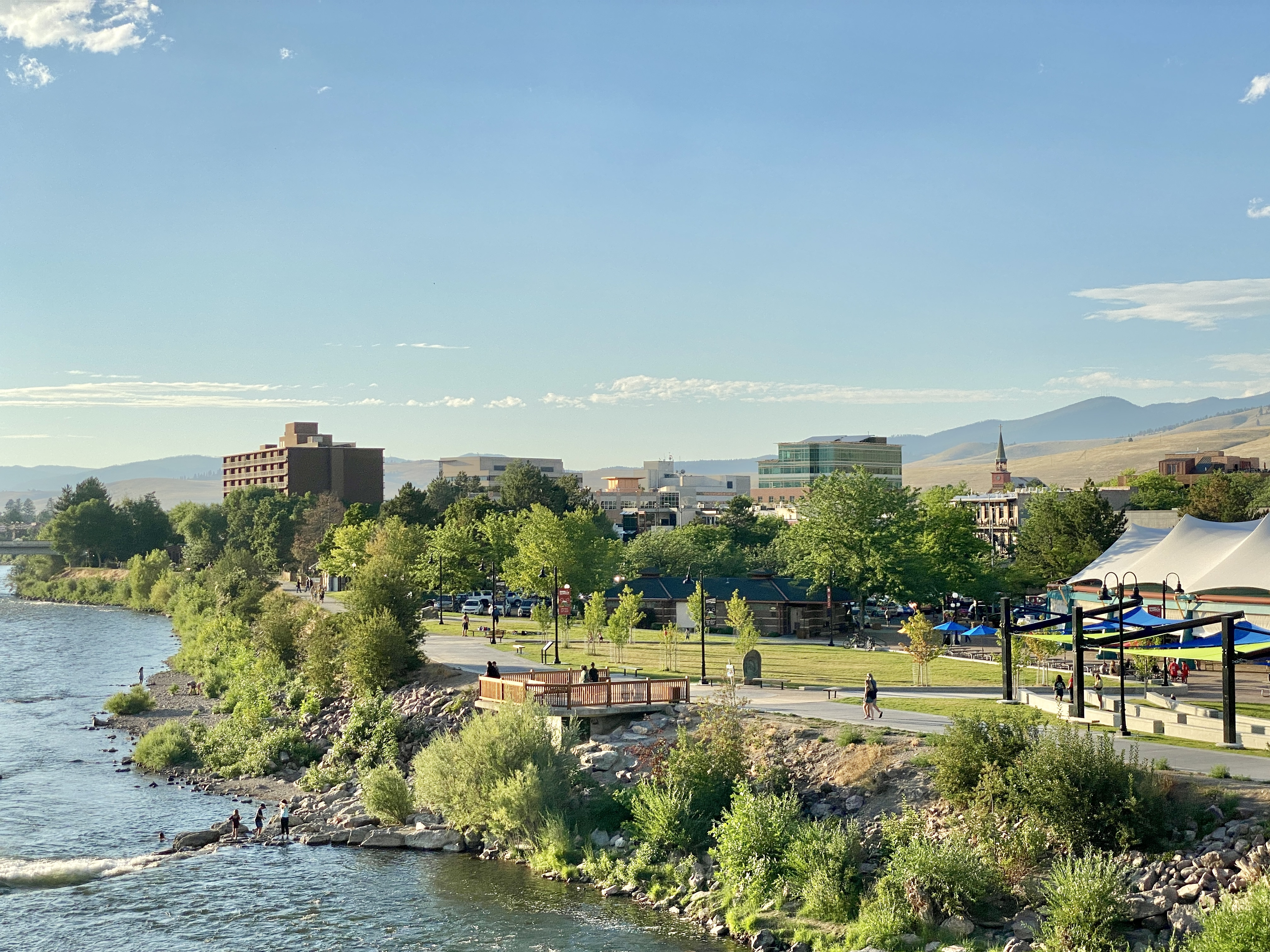
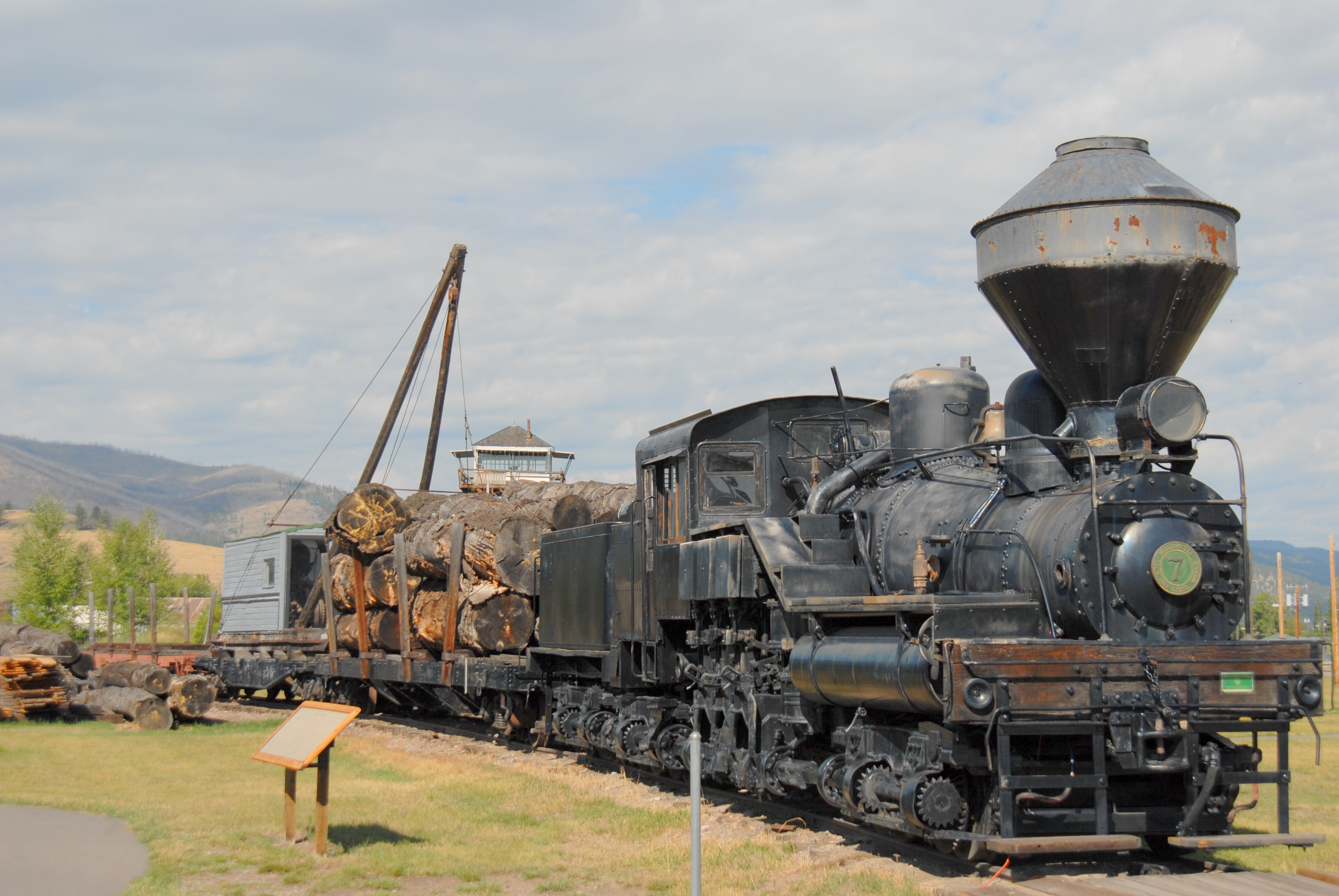
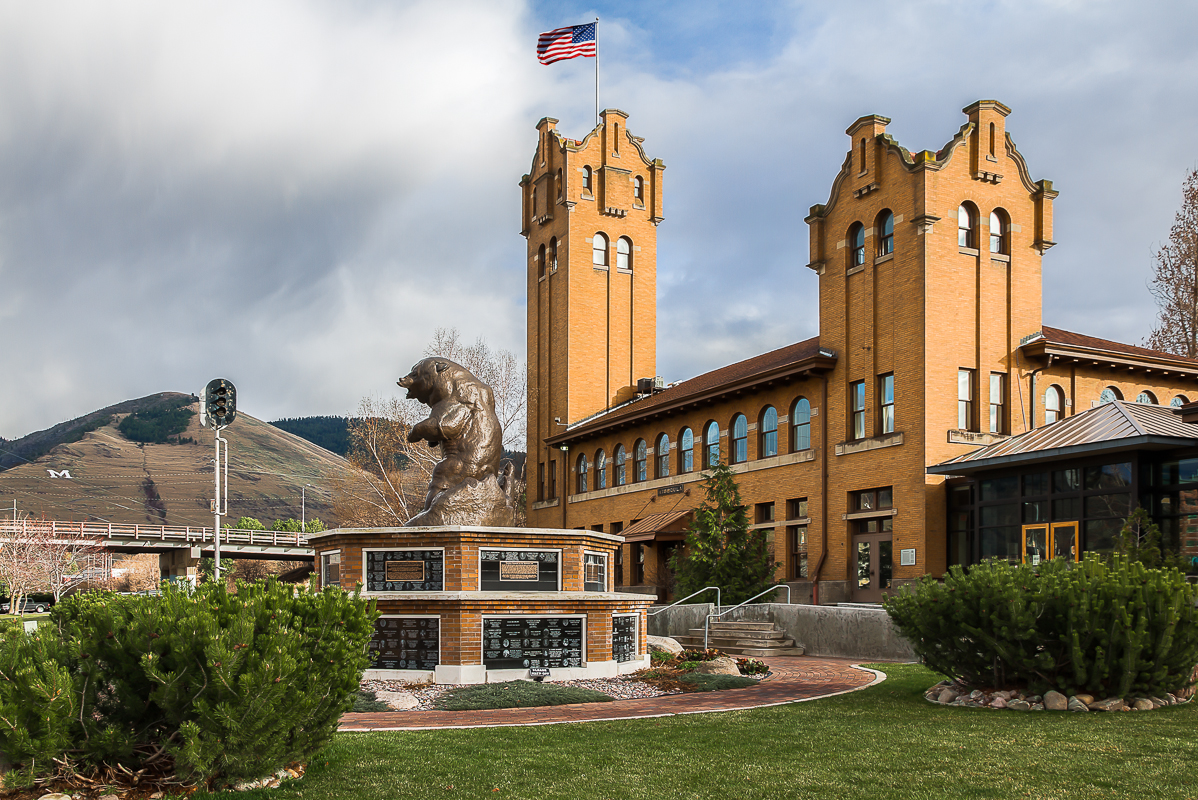
- Downtown Missoula University of Montana Caras Park Fort Missoula Milwaukee Depot

- Flag Seal
- Nicknames: Zootown, The Garden City, and the Zoo
- Motto: Missoula We Like It Here
- Interactive map of Missoula
- Location within Montana Location within the United States
- Coordinates: 46.874359°N 114.026136°W
- Country: United States
- State: Montana
- County: Missoula
- Founded: 1860
- Incorporated (town): March 8, 1883
- Incorporated (city): March 12, 1885
- Founder: Christopher P. Higgins; Francis Lyman Worden

Government
  - Type: Mayor–council
  - Mayor: Andrea Davis (D)
  - City manager: Dale Bickell

Area
  - City: 35.217 sq mi (91.212 km^{2})
  - Land: 35.028 sq mi (90.721 km^{2})
  - Water: 0.190 sq mi (0.491 km^{2}) 0.54%
  - Urban: 44.286 sq mi (114.701 km^{2})
  - Metro: 3,812.759 sq mi (9,875.001 km^{2})
- Elevation: 3,169 ft (966 m)

Population (2020)
  - City: 73,489
  - Estimate (2025): 78,903
  - Rank: US: 483rd MT: 2nd
  - Density: 2,230/sq mi (862/km^{2})
  - Urban: 88,109 (US: 335th)
  - Urban density: 1,989/sq mi (768.1/km^{2})
  - Metro: 127,741 (US: 320th)
  - Metro density: 33.51/sq mi (12.939/km^{2})
- Demonym: Missoulian
- Time zone: UTC–7 (Mountain (MST))
  - Summer (DST): UTC–6 (MDT)
- ZIP Codes: 59801–59804, 59806–59808
- University of Montana ZIP Code: 59812
- Area code: 406
- FIPS code: 30-50200
- GNIS feature ID: 2411124
- Website: ci.missoula.mt.us

Missoula (/mɪˈzuːlə/ mih-ZOO-lə) is a city in and the county seat of Missoula County, Montana, United States. It is located along the Clark Fork River near its confluence with the Bitterroot and Blackfoot rivers in western Montana and at the convergence of five mountain ranges, and thus it is often described as the "hub of five valleys". It is the second-most populous city in Montana with a population of 73,489 at the 2020 census, increasing to an estimated 78,903 in 2025, while the Missoula metropolitan area has an estimated 128,698 residents. Missoula is home to the University of Montana, a public research university.

The Missoula area was settled by people of European descent from 1858, including William T. Hamilton, who set up a trading post along the Rattlesnake Creek; Captain Richard Grant, who settled near Grant Creek; and David Pattee, who settled near Pattee Canyon. Missoula was founded in 1860 as Hellgate Trading Post while still part of Washington Territory. By 1866, the settlement had moved east, 5 miles (8 km) upstream, and had been renamed "Missoula Mills", later shortened to Missoula. The mills provided supplies to western settlers traveling along the Mullan Road. The establishment of Fort Missoula in 1877 to protect settlers further stabilized the economy. The arrival of the Northern Pacific Railway in 1883 brought rapid growth and the maturation of the local lumber industry. In 1893, the Montana Legislature chose Missoula as the site for the state's first university. Along with the U.S. Forest Service headquarters founded in 1908, lumber and the university remained the basis of the local economy for the next 100 years.

By the 1990s, Missoula's lumber industry had gradually disappeared, and as of 2009, the city's largest employers were the University of Montana, Missoula County Public Schools, and Missoula's two hospitals. The city is governed by a mayor–council government with 12 city council members, two from each of the six wards. In and around Missoula are 400 acres (160 ha) of parkland, 22 miles (35 km) of trails, and nearly 5,000 acres (2,000 ha) of open-space conservation land, with adjacent Mount Jumbo being home to grazing elk and mule deer during the winter. The city is also home to both of Montana's largest and its oldest active breweries, as well as the Montana Grizzlies.

== History ==
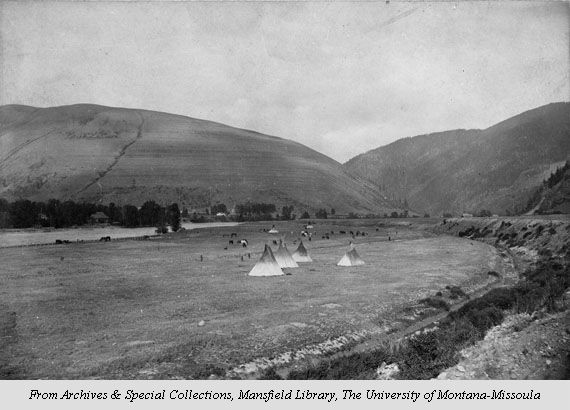
Teepees at the site of Missoula, south of the Clark Fork River, facing northeast

Archaeological artifacts date the earliest inhabitants of the Missoula Valley to 12,000 years ago, with settlements as early as 3500 BCE. From the 1700s until the 1850s, those who used the land were primarily the Salish, Kootenai, Pend d'Oreille, Blackfeet, and Shoshone people. Located at the confluence of five mountain valleys, the Missoula Valley was heavily traversed by local and distant native tribes that periodically went to the Eastern Montana plains in search of bison. This led to conflicts. The narrow valley at Missoula's eastern entrance was so strewn with human bones from repeated ambushes that French fur trappers later referred to this area as Porte de l'Enfer, translated as "Gate of Hell". Hell Gate would remain the name of the area until it was renamed "Missoula" in 1866.

The Lewis and Clark Expedition brought the first U.S. citizens to the area. They twice stopped just south of Missoula at Traveler's Rest. They camped there the first time on their westbound trip in September 1805. When they stayed there again, on their return in June–July 1806, Clark left heading south along the Bitterroot River and Lewis traveled north, then east, through Hellgate Canyon. In 1860, Hell Gate Village was established 5 miles (8 km) west of present-day downtown by Christopher P. Higgins and Frank Worden as a trading post to serve travelers on the recently completed Mullan Road, the first wagon road to cross the Rocky Mountains to the inland of the Pacific Northwest. The desire for a more convenient water supply to power a lumber and flour mill led to the movement of the settlement to its modern location in 1864.

The Missoula Mills replaced Hell Gate Village as the economic power of the valley and replaced it as the county seat in 1866. The name "Missoula" came from the Salish name for the Clark Fork River, nmesuletkw, which roughly translates as "place of frozen water". Fort Missoula was established in 1877 to help protect further arriving settlers. Growth accelerated with the arrival of the Northern Pacific Railway in 1883, and by charter, Missoula incorporated a municipal government as a town, the same year. In 1885, Missoula reincorporated its government as a city.

In 1893, Missoula was chosen as the location for the first state university, the University of Montana. The need for lumber for the railway and its bridges spurred the opening of multiple saw mills in the area, and in turn, the beginning of Missoula's lumber industry, which remained the mainstay of the area economy for the next 100 years. The United States Forest Service work in Missoula began in 1905. Missoula is also home of the smokejumpers' headquarters and will be the site of the National Museum of Forest Service History. Nationally, there are nine Forest Service regions; Region 1 is headquartered in Missoula.

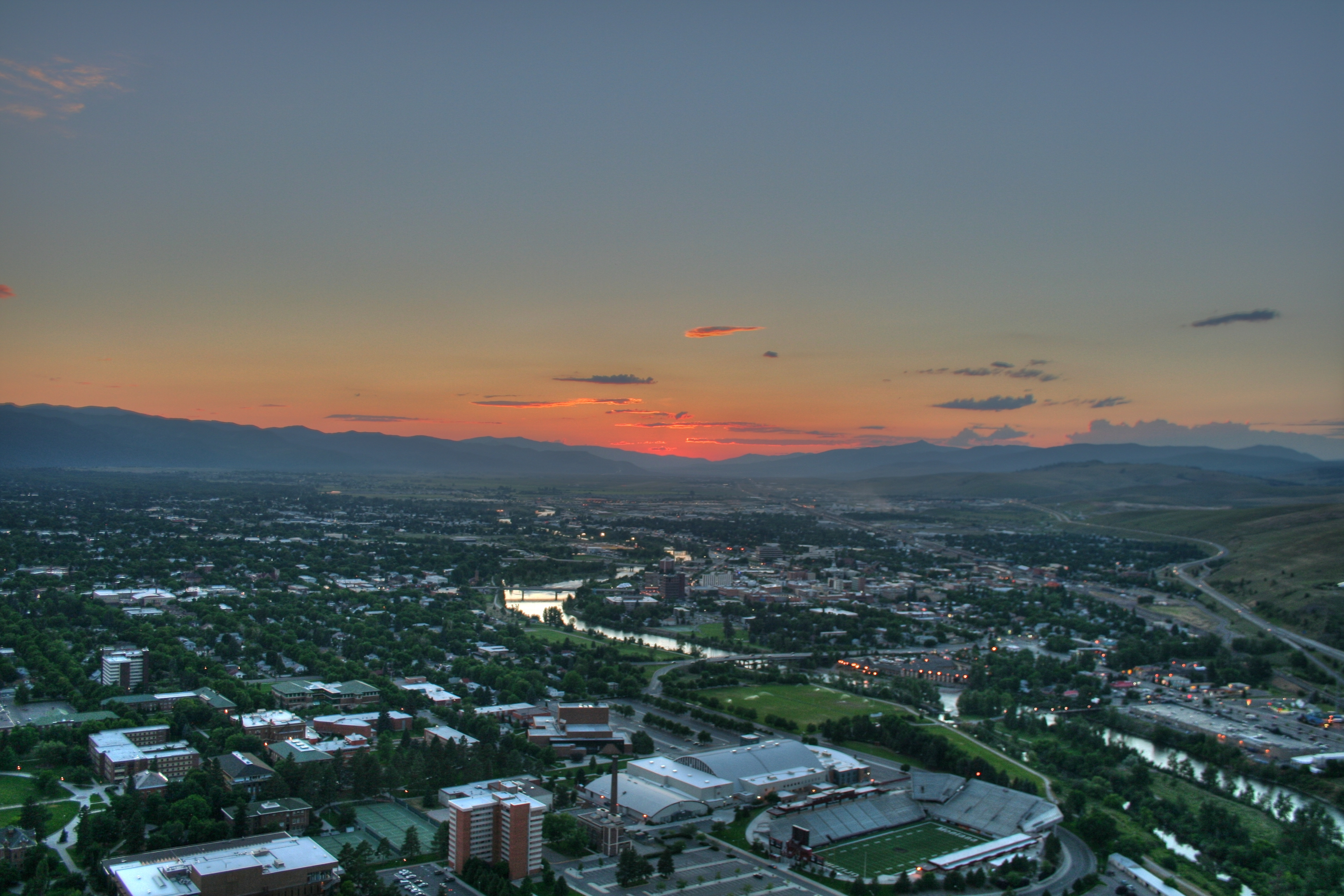
View of downtown from Mt. Sentinel

Logging remained a mainstay of industry in Missoula with the groundbreaking of the Hoerner-Waldorf pulp mill in 1956, which resulted in protests over the resultant air pollution. An article in Life 13 years later speaks of Missoulians sometimes needing to drive with headlights on during the day to navigate through the smog. In 1979, almost 40% of the county labor income still came from the wood and paper-products sector. The lumber industry was hit hard by the recession of the early 1980s, and Missoula's economy began to diversify. By the early 1990s, the disappearance of many of the region's log yards, along with legislation, had helped clean the air dramatically.

In 1883, the Northern Pacific Railroad arrived in Missoula, spurring rapid growth in the town, which by then had about 500 residents.

In March 1970, the Northern Pacific, along with three other closely affiliated railroads (Chicago, Burlington & Quincy, Great Northern and Spokane, Portland & Seattle) merged to form Burlington Northern.

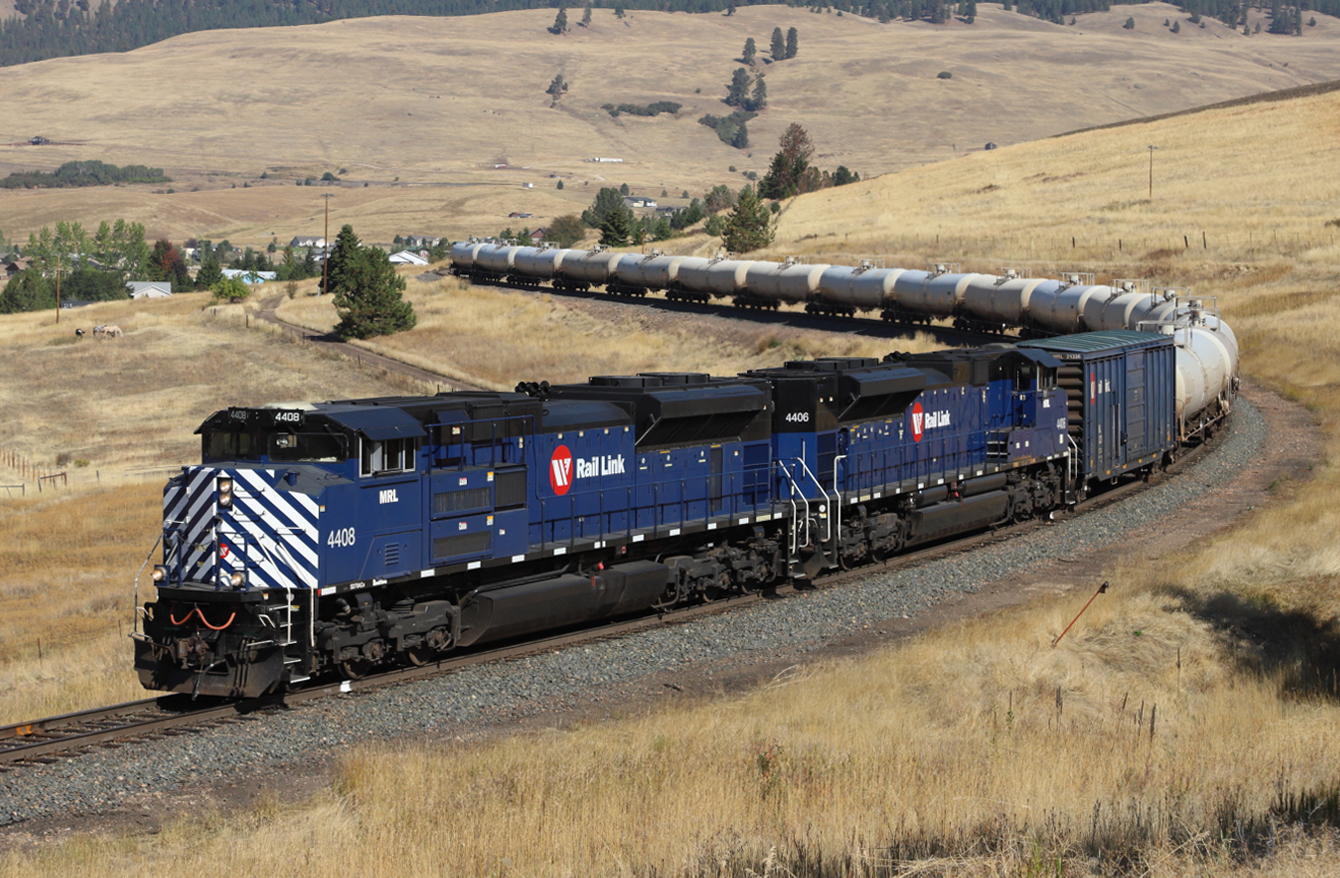
A Montana Rail Link oil train. Until January 2024, when BNSF resumed operations on the tracks formerly leased to MRL, the defunct company had its headquarters in Missoula.

In 1987, BN decided to lease, for an initial term of 60 years, the ex-NP route to entrepreneur Dennis Washington, who formed Montana Rail Link. MRL established its headquarters in Missoula.

In January 2022, BNSF agreed to pay MRL $2 billion for an early lease termination. The return to BNSF control required the approval of the Surface Transportation Board, and this was later approved on March 8, 2023. BNSF took over operations on January 1, 2024. This absorbed the MRL into BNSF, integrating MRL operations, technology and personnel. All 1,200 employees were offered employment with BNSF.

As of 2009, education and healthcare were Missoula's leading industries; the University of Montana, Missoula County Public Schools, and the two hospitals in the city were the largest employers. St. Patrick Hospital and Health Sciences Center, founded in 1873, is the region's only Level II trauma center and has undergone three major expansions since the 1980s. Likewise, the University of Montana grew 50% and built or renovated 20 buildings from 1990 to 2010. These industries, as well as expansions in business and professional services, and retail are expected to be the main engines of future growth.

In 2025, Montana enacted H.B. 819 to ban certain flags (including pride flags) from being displayed at government and educational buildings. In response to this, on June 2, 2025, the Missoula City Council passed a resolution in a vote of 9–2 titled "A Resolution of the Missoula City Council Recognizing the Pride Flag as an Official Flag of the City of Missoula". The resolution recognizes the pride flag and any variant of it as an official flag of Missoula and thus allows it to be flown on government property. The decision was made following a meeting in the city council chamber where a majority of public comments expressed support for the adoption of the flag. Missoula did not have an official flag prior to this resolution. Greg Gianforte, the Republican governor of Montana, when asked about the decision, criticized it, as did Braxton Mitchell, a Republican member of the Montana House of Representatives.

Missoula's oldest commercial district, Downtown is also home to more than 30 buildings listed on the National Register of Historic Places beginning in 1976 with the A.J. Gibson designed County Courthouse constructed in 1908 being added. The Post Office, Wilma Theatre and Higgins Block were all added a couple years later. In the 1970s businesses fled Downtown for cheaper land in Southwest Missoula. This created a second commercial district focused around the Southgate Mall, built in 1978. Subsequent deterioration of Downtown ironically saved its future. With old buildings too expensive to replace and no big businesses moving in rents began to fall. This led to the myriad of small start-up shops in historic buildings that Downtown is known for today. The area went from bankrupt to the center of Missoula's arts and culture in matter of 25 years. In the late 1990s North Reserve Street became the new center for large retail stores. Located at the cross streets of Highway-93 and the old Mullan Road with easy access to Interstate 90, the area has become a major shopping destination for local and regional customers.

== Geography ==
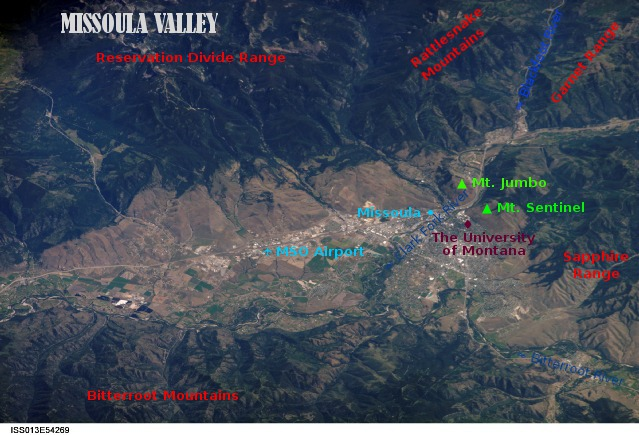
Missoula Valley

Missoula is located at the western edge of Montana, less than 25 miles (40 km) from the Idaho border as the crow flies. By highway it is 117 miles (188 km) south of Kalispell, 118 miles (190 km) northwest of Butte and 165 miles (266 km) southeast of Coeur d'Alene, Idaho. The city is at an elevation of 3,209 feet (978 m) above sea level, with nearby Mount Sentinel and Mount Jumbo steeply rising to 5,158 feet (1,572 m) and 4,768 feet (1,453 m), respectively.

According to the United States Census Bureau, the city has a total area of 35.217 square miles (91.21 km^{2}), of which 35.027 square miles (90.72 km^{2}) is land and 0.190 square miles (0.49 km^{2}) (0.54%) is water.

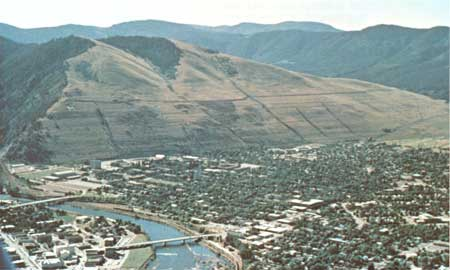
Ancient wave-cut shorelines are visible on the edge of Mount Sentinel.

Around 13,000 years ago, the entire valley was at the bottom of Glacial Lake Missoula. As could be expected for a former lake bottom, the layout of Missoula is relatively flat and surrounded by steep hills. Evidence of the city of Missoula's lake-bottom past can be seen in the form of ancient horizontal wave-cut shorelines on nearby Mount Sentinel and Mount Jumbo. At the location of present-day University of Montana, the lake once had a depth of 950 feet (290 m). The Clark Fork River enters the Missoula Valley from the east through Hellgate Canyon after joining the Blackfoot River 5 miles (8 km) east of downtown, at the site of the former Milltown Dam. The Bitterroot River and multiple smaller tributaries join the Clark Fork on the western edge of Missoula. The city also sits at the convergence of five mountain ranges: the Bitterroot Mountains, Sapphire Range, Garnet Range, Rattlesnake Mountains, and the Reservation Divide, and thus is often described as being the "hub of five valleys".

Soils in Missoula are mostly of silty clay loam or loam texture. Some of the loams which developed on stream terraces and alluvial fans are very gravelly (Bigarm Series). Soil drainage is somewhat excessive where gravel content is high, and the less gravelly soils are well drained. Topsoils usually have neutral pH while subsoils may be rich in calcium carbonate and therefore alkaline.

=== Suburbs ===
- Bonner-West Riverside
- Clinton
- East Missoula
- Evaro
- Frenchtown
- Lolo
- Orchard Homes
- Piltzville
- Turah
- Twin Creeks
- Wye

=== Flora and fauna ===
Located in the Northern Rockies, Missoula has a typical Rocky Mountain ecology. Local wildlife includes populations of white-tailed deer, moose, grizzly bears, black bears, osprey, and bald eagles. During the winter, rapid snowmelt on Mount Jumbo due to its steep slope leaves grass available for grazing elk and mule deer. The rivers around Missoula provide nesting habitats for bank swallows, northern rough-winged swallows, and belted kingfishers. Killdeer and spotted sandpipers can be seen foraging for insects along the gravel bars. Other species include song sparrows, catbirds, several species of warblers, and the pileated woodpecker. The rivers also provide cold, clean water for native fish such as westslope cutthroat trout and bull trout. The meandering streams also attract beaver and wood ducks. The parks also host a variety of snakes such as racers, garter snakes, and rubber boa.

Native riparian plant life includes sandbar willows and cottonwoods, with Montana's state tree, the ponderosa pine, also being prevalent. Other native plants include wetland species such as cattails and beaked sedge, as well as shrubs and berry plants such as Douglas hawthorn, chokecherry, and western snowberries. To the chagrin of local farmers, Missoula is also home to several noxious weeds, which multiple programs have set out to eliminate. Notable ones include Dalmatian toadflax, spotted knapweed, leafy spurge, St. John's wort, and sulfur cinquefoil. Controversially, the Norway maples that line many of Missoula's older streets have also been declared an invasive species.

=== Climate ===
Missoula has a humid continental climate (Köppen climate classification Dfb), with cold and moderately snowy winters, hot and dry summers, and short, crisp springs and autumns. Winters are usually milder than much of the rest of the state due to Missoula's location west of the Rockies, allowing it to receive mild, moist Pacific air and avoid the worst of cold snaps; however, it also gets more precipitation in winter. Winter snowfall averages 39.5 inches (100 cm), typically occurring between October 30 and April 20, with an annual average of 120 days of snow on the ground. As with the rest of the state, summers are very sunny, and the average diurnal temperature variation is more than 30 °F (17 °C) from late June through late September, due to the relative aridity. The monthly daily average temperature ranges from 23.9 °F (−4.5 °C) in December to 68.6 °F (20.3 °C) in July. On average, annually, there are 24 days with temperatures at or above 90 °F (32 °C), 45 days where the temperature does not rise above freezing, and 7.8 days with temperatures reaching at or below 0 °F (−18 °C). Record temperatures range from −33 °F (−36 °C) on January 26, 1957, up to 107 °F (42 °C), most recently on June 30, 2021; the record cold maximum is −13 °F (−25 °C), last recorded on February 2, 1989, while, conversely, the record warm minimum is 72 °F (22 °C) on July 27, 1939.

Climate data for Missoula, Montana (Missoula Airport) (1991-2020 normals, (Note: Mean monthly maxima and minima (i.e. the expected highest and lowest temperature readings at any point during the year or given month) calculated based on data at said location from 1991 to 2020.) extremes 1893–present)
Month	Jan	Feb	Mar	Apr	May	Jun	Jul	Aug	Sep	Oct	Nov	Dec	Year
Record high °F (°C)	60 (16)	66 (19)	78 (26)	90 (32)	95 (35)	102 (39)	107 (42)	105 (41)	99 (37)	85 (29)	73 (23)	67 (19)	107 (42)
Mean maximum °F (°C)	47.9 (8.8)	51.3 (10.7)	65.2 (18.4)	75.6 (24.2)	84.9 (29.4)	90.9 (32.7)	98.0 (36.7)	97.3 (36.3)	89.8 (32.1)	75.3 (24.1)	58.5 (14.7)	47.2 (8.4)	99.6 (37.6)
Mean daily maximum °F (°C)	31.6 (−0.2)	37.0 (2.8)	47.9 (8.8)	56.1 (13.4)	66.2 (19.0)	73.2 (22.9)	85.4 (29.7)	84.3 (29.1)	72.6 (22.6)	55.7 (13.2)	39.9 (4.4)	30.9 (−0.6)	56.7 (13.7)
Daily mean °F (°C)	24.8 (−4.0)	29.0 (−1.7)	37.4 (3.0)	44.2 (6.8)	53.0 (11.7)	59.7 (15.4)	68.4 (20.2)	67.2 (19.6)	57.5 (14.2)	44.1 (6.7)	32.3 (0.2)	24.4 (−4.2)	45.2 (7.3)
Mean daily minimum °F (°C)	18.0 (−7.8)	20.9 (−6.2)	26.8 (−2.9)	32.3 (0.2)	39.8 (4.3)	46.3 (7.9)	51.5 (10.8)	50.1 (10.1)	42.4 (5.8)	32.4 (0.2)	24.6 (−4.1)	17.8 (−7.9)	33.6 (0.9)
Mean minimum °F (°C)	−3.7 (−19.8)	1.9 (−16.7)	12.2 (−11.0)	21.9 (−5.6)	27.6 (−2.4)	34.9 (1.6)	41.4 (5.2)	40.2 (4.6)	30.1 (−1.1)	16.9 (−8.4)	8.5 (−13.1)	−1.5 (−18.6)	−10.9 (−23.8)
Record low °F (°C)	−33 (−36)	−28 (−33)	−13 (−25)	2 (−17)	21 (−6)	26 (−3)	27 (−3)	25 (−4)	15 (−9)	−7 (−22)	−23 (−31)	−30 (−34)	−33 (−36)
Average precipitation inches (mm)	0.96 (24)	0.88 (22)	0.92 (23)	1.36 (35)	1.77 (45)	2.14 (54)	0.85 (22)	0.83 (21)	0.96 (24)	1.18 (30)	1.18 (30)	1.08 (27)	14.11 (358)
Average snowfall inches (cm)	9.9 (25)	8.5 (22)	5.0 (13)	1.3 (3.3)	0.3 (0.76)	0.0 (0.0)	0 (0)	0 (0)	0.1 (0.25)	0.9 (2.3)	5.4 (14)	11.6 (29)	43.0 (109)
Average precipitation days (≥ 0.01 in)	12.5	10.8	11.4	11.4	12.1	12.5	6.0	6.4	7.3	9.9	11.1	12.6	124.0
Average snowy days (≥ 0.1 in)	9.7	8.1	4.9	1.5	0.3	0.1	0.0	0.0	0.1	0.8	5.2	9.5	40.2
Average relative humidity (%)	81.3	78.1	70.3	61.2	61.7	61.1	51.7	52.5	62.8	70.8	80.2	83.5	67.9
Average dew point °F (°C)	17.2 (−8.2)	21.7 (−5.7)	25.3 (−3.7)	29.7 (−1.3)	37.2 (2.9)	44.4 (6.9)	45.7 (7.6)	44.4 (6.9)	39.7 (4.3)	32.7 (0.4)	25.9 (−3.4)	18.7 (−7.4)	31.9 (−0.1)
Mean monthly sunshine hours	95.8	133.0	209.3	245.0	280.5	311.1	389.3	334.8	264.7	194.3	99.5	82.9	2,640.2
Percentage possible sunshine	34	46	57	60	60	66	81	76	70	58	35	31	59
Source: NOAA

== Demographics ==
Historical population
Census	Pop.	Note	%±
1870	400		—
1880	347		−13.2%
1890	3,426		887.3%
1900	4,366		27.4%
1910	12,896		195.4%
1920	12,668		−1.8%
1930	14,657		15.7%
1940	18,449		25.9%
1950	22,485		21.9%
1960	27,090		20.5%
1970	29,497		8.9%
1980	33,388		13.2%
1990	42,918		28.5%
2000	57,053		32.9%
2010	66,788		17.1%
2020	73,489		10.0%
2025 (est.)	78,903		7.4%
Sources: 1870–1990, U.S. Decennial Census; 2020 Census

As of the 2023 American Community Survey, there are 33,958 estimated households in Missoula with an average of 2.14 persons per household. The city has a median household income of $65,329. Approximately 12.8% of the city's population lives at or below the poverty line. Missoula has an estimated 72.6% employment rate, with 51.7% of the population holding a bachelor's degree or higher and 96.8% holding a high school diploma.

=== Racial and ethnic composition ===
Missoula, Montana – racial and ethnic composition Note: the US Census treats Hispanic/Latino as an ethnic category. This table excludes Latinos from the racial categories and assigns them to a separate category. Hispanics/Latinos may be of any race.
Race / ethnicity (NH = non-Hispanic)	Pop. 2000	Pop. 2010	Pop. 2020	% 2000	% 2010	% 2020
White alone (NH)	52,843	60,313	60,972	92.62%	90.31%	82.97%
Black or African American alone (NH)	201	327	585	0.35%	0.49%	0.80%
Native American or Alaska Native alone (NH)	1,264	1,680	1,892	2.22%	2.52%	2.57%
Asian alone (NH)	697	798	1,026	1.22%	1.19%	1.40%
Pacific Islander alone (NH)	48	68	91	0.08%	0.10%	0.12%
Other race alone (NH)	76	71	328	0.13%	0.11%	0.45%
Mixed race or multiracial (NH)	920	1,588	4,027	1.61%	2.38%	5.48%
Hispanic or Latino (any race)	1,004	1,943	4,568	1.76%	2.91%	6.22%
Total	57,053	66,788	73,489	100.00%	100.00%	100.00%

=== 2020 census ===
As of the 2020 census, Missoula had a population of 73,489. The median age was 35.0 years. 18.3% of residents were under the age of 18 and 15.5% of residents were 65 years of age or older. For every 100 females there were 96.5 males, and for every 100 females age 18 and over there were 94.7 males age 18 and over.

98.8% of residents lived in urban areas, while 1.2% lived in rural areas.

There were 32,816 households and 16,040 families in the city. Of all households, 23.0% had children under the age of 18 living in them, 35.0% were married-couple households, 24.3% were households with a male householder and no spouse or partner present, and 30.3% were households with a female householder and no spouse or partner present. About 36.4% of all households were made up of individuals and 12.0% had someone living alone who was 65 years of age or older.

There were 34,747 housing units, of which 5.6% were vacant. The population density was 2,130.3 inhabitants per square mile (822.5/km^{2}), and housing units were at an average density of 1,007.2 per square mile (388.9/km^{2}). The homeowner vacancy rate was 0.8% and the rental vacancy rate was 4.6%.

Racial composition as of the 2020 census
Race	Number	Percent
White	62,029	84.4%
Black or African American	627	0.9%
American Indian and Alaska Native	2,097	2.9%
Asian	1,051	1.4%
Native Hawaiian and Other Pacific Islander	94	0.1%
Some other race	2,265	3.1%
Two or more races	5,326	7.2%
Hispanic or Latino (of any race)	4,568	6.2%

=== 2010 census ===
As of the 2010 census, there were 66,788 people, 29,081 households, and 13,990 families residing in the city. The population density was 2,427.6 inhabitants per square mile (937.3/km^{2}). There were 30,682 housing units at an average density of 1,115.3 per square mile (430.6/km^{2}). The racial makeup of the city was 92.13% White, 0.53% African American, 2.75% Native American, 1.21% Asian, 0.10% Pacific Islander, 0.50% from some other races and 2.77% from two or more races. Hispanic or Latino people of any race were 2.91% of the population.

There were 29,081 households, 23.6% had children under the age of 18 living with them, 34.4% were married couples living together, 9.6% had a female householder with no husband present, 4.1% had a male householder with no wife present, and 51.9% were not families. About 35.0% of all households were made up of individuals, and 9.1% had someone living alone who was 65 years of age or older. The average household size was 2.18 and the average family size was 2.82.

In the city, the population was distributed as 17.9% of residents under 18, 19.7% between the ages of 18 and 24, 29.6% from 25 to 44, 22.1% from 45 to 64, and 10.7% who were 65 years of age or older. The median age in the city was 30.9 years. The gender makeup of the city was 49.9% male and 50.1% female.

=== 2000 census ===
In the 2000 census, the median income for a household in the city was $30,366, and for a family was $42,103. Males had a median income of $30,686 versus $21,559 for females. The per capita income for the city was $17,166. About 11.7% of families and 19.7% of the population were below the poverty line, including 20.5% of those under age 18 and 9.3% of those age 65 or over. About 40.3% of Missoula residents age 25 and older have a bachelor's or advanced college degree.

=== Education ===
Highest educational attainment Population 25 years and over (2014)	Missoula	Montana	U.S.
Less than 9th grade	1.2%	2.2%	5.8%
9th to 12th grade, no diploma	3.3%	5.3%	7.8%
High school graduate or equivalent	19.0%	29.8%	28.0%
Some college	24.1%	25.3%	21.2%
Associate degree	6.7%	8.3%	7.9%
Bachelor's degree	28.0%	19.8%	18.3%
Graduate or professional degree	17.7%	9.2%	11.0%
High school or higher	95.5%	92.4%	86.3%
Bachelor's degree or higher	45.7%	29.1%	29.3%

== Economy ==
Missoula began as a trading post in the 1860s situated along the Mullan Military Road to take advantage of the first route across the Bitterroot Mountains to the plains of Eastern Washington. Its designation as county seat in 1866 and location of the hastily built Fort Missoula in 1877 ensured Missoula's status as a regional commercial center, a status further consolidated in 1883 with the arrival of the Northern Pacific Railway. The railroad expanded Missoula's trade area to cover a 150-mile radius, and Missoula's location as the railway's division point and repair shops provided hundreds of jobs. When the railway began expanding again in 1898, increased freight shipments came through the city, and with the arrival of the Milwaukee Road and regional office for the U.S. Forest Service, as well as the opening of the Flathead Indian Reservation to settlement all within a couple years of each other beginning in 1908, the economy began to expand rapidly.

Lumber mills were originally built to provide construction-grade materials for homes and businesses, but then expanded to entice and then meet the demands of the railroad; they profited from an increase in demand from railroad expansion and the nation at large. The Bonner mill, owned the Northern Pacific and Copper King Marcus Daly, became the largest producer of lumber in the northwest. In 1908, Missoula's location as both a major lumber producer and a regional commercial center helped land the city the regional office for the newly establish U.S. Forest Service, created to help manage the nation's timber supply. Over the next century, Missoula's various lumber industries was consolidated under various entities such as the Anaconda Company in the 1970s and Champion International Paper through the 1980s until most were under control of Plum Creek Timber, all the while demand in timber dropped. In 2007, a downward spiral of Missoula's lumber industry began with the closure of a plywood plant in Bonner, the closure of Bonner's sawmill in 2008, and the closing of the Smurfit-Stone Container pulp mill in 2010.

Since opening in 1895, the University of Montana has had a major impact on the development of Missoula's economy. In addition to the economic advantage from accommodating the student body, it gave the city an educated workforce not available in most of the state. The university has a close relationship with the city as Missoula's largest employer and with the millions of dollars the school brings into the city through visitors of school-sponsored sporting and cultural events. The university also houses Missoula's only business incubator, the Montana Technology Enterprise Center, and several start-up businesses.

Missoula is the hub of its Bureau of Economic Analysis (BEA) economic area, which includes the Montana counties of Flathead, Lake, Lincoln, Mineral, Missoula, Ravalli, and Sanders. As of 2011, the BEA listed the economic area population at 306,050. Key businesses sectors serving the area include health care, retail shopping, transportation, financial services, government and social services, education, events, arts and culture. Health care in particular is one of Missoula's fastest growing industries with St. Patrick Hospital (western Montana's only level-II trauma center) and the Community Medical Center, already the city's second- and third-largest employers behind the university. About 55% of employment in Missoula is made up of the service and retail sectors. Export industries are concentrated in heavy and civil engineering, construction, beverage production, technical services, truck transportation, and forestry-, logging-, and wood-related industries. In addition to nearly 4 million out-of-state visitors annually, which makes tourism a significant aspect of the Missoula economy, Missoula also is home to a vibrant sector of alternative healthcare.

As of 2013, Missoula ranked 299 nationally in gross metropolitan product with an output of $5 billion, while the city's total personal income ranked 333 at $4.18 billion, an increase of more than 47% since 2003. As of 2013, per capita personal income ranked 239 at $37,397 a year, 84% of the national average. The Missoula metropolitan area's unemployment rate was 3.7% as of June 2015, dropping nearly 0.8% in the twelve months prior.

=== Top employers ===
As of the city's 2023 Annual Comprehensive Financial Report, Missoula's top employers are:

#	Employer	Number of employees
1	University of Montana	2,842
2	Missoula County Public Schools	1,450
3	St. Patrick Hospital	1,321
4	Montana Rail Link	1,056
5	Community Medical Center	1,015
6	Missoula County	948
7	City of Missoula	730
8	Allegiance Benefit Plan Management	661
9	Walmart	471
10	Consumer Direct Care Network	451

== Culture ==
Missoula, often considered the cultural center of Montana, is the location of the state's first university, and an eclectic mix of loggers, hippies, college students, sports fans, and retirees. Community events generally take place downtown either outdoors or in one of the several downtown buildings listed on the National Historic Registry.

Since 2006, the River City Roots Festival has been an event each August with music, beer, food, and art, and generally attracts crowds of 15,000. The longest-standing event downtown has been the Missoula Farmers Market that was founded in 1972, which provides an outlet for Western Montana produce on Saturday mornings from May to October as well as Tuesday evenings from July to early September. An arts and crafts People's Market and a Clark Fork Market run concurrently. Downtown hosts "First Friday Missoula", a gallery walk on the first Friday of the month to feature local art from museums and galleries, such as that of Monte Dolack. Missoula celebrates "First Night Missoula" on New Year's Eve, which includes food and live entertainment. The "Festival of the Book" to celebrate the literature of the American West was rebranded the "Montana Book Festival" in 2015. Missoula's two historic theatres both hold annual film festivals: the Roxy Theater hosting the International Wildlife Film Festival, established in 1977 as the first juried wildlife film festival in the world; and since 2003, the Wilma accommodating the largest film event in Montana, the Big Sky Documentary Film Festival.

In performance arts, the Missoula Community Theatre has held performances of musical and nonmusical plays since 1977, with its affiliated Missoula Children's Theatre also acting as an international touring program that visits nearly 1,000 communities per year around the world. Missoula is also home to a number of modern dance companies, including Bare Bait Dance and Headwaters Dance Company. Rocky Mountain Ballet Theatre and Garden City Ballet are also based in Missoula.

The Montana Museum of Art & Culture, which became a state museum in 2001, is one Montana's oldest cultural reserves, having begun in 1894; its permanent collection houses more than 10,000 original works. The Missoula Museum of Art is housed in a former Carnegie library; it features contemporary art and annually features 20–25 group and solo exhibits. Fort Missoula is home to the Historic Museum, dedicated to preserving the history of Western Montana, and to the Rocky Mountain Museum of Military History and the Northern Rockies Heritage Center. The National Museum of Forest Service History is constructing the National Conservation Legacy and Education Center in Missoula, too.

Ad for Moose Drool Brown Ale

Opened in 1987, Missoula's Bayern Brewing is the oldest active brewery in Montana. Big Sky Brewing opened in 1995 and with a production over 38,000 barrels in 2008, it is by far Montana's largest brewery, and produces the best-selling beer brewed in Montana, Moose Drool Brown Ale. Missoula has also been home to Kettle House Brewing since 1995 and Draught Works opened in 2011. Big Sky, Bayern, and Kettlehouse represent the first-, second-, and third-largest breweries, respectively, in Montana. Also in 2011, Tamarack Brewing and Flathead Lake Brewing Company from nearby Lake County opened pub houses at downtown Missoula locations. In 2025 there were ten breweries. The city also holds annually the Garden City Brewfest and Winterfest, and periodically hosts the Montana Brewers Festival.

The Clay Studio of Missoula is a non-profit ceramic-arts center, which provides education and a community access clay studio.

== Sports ==
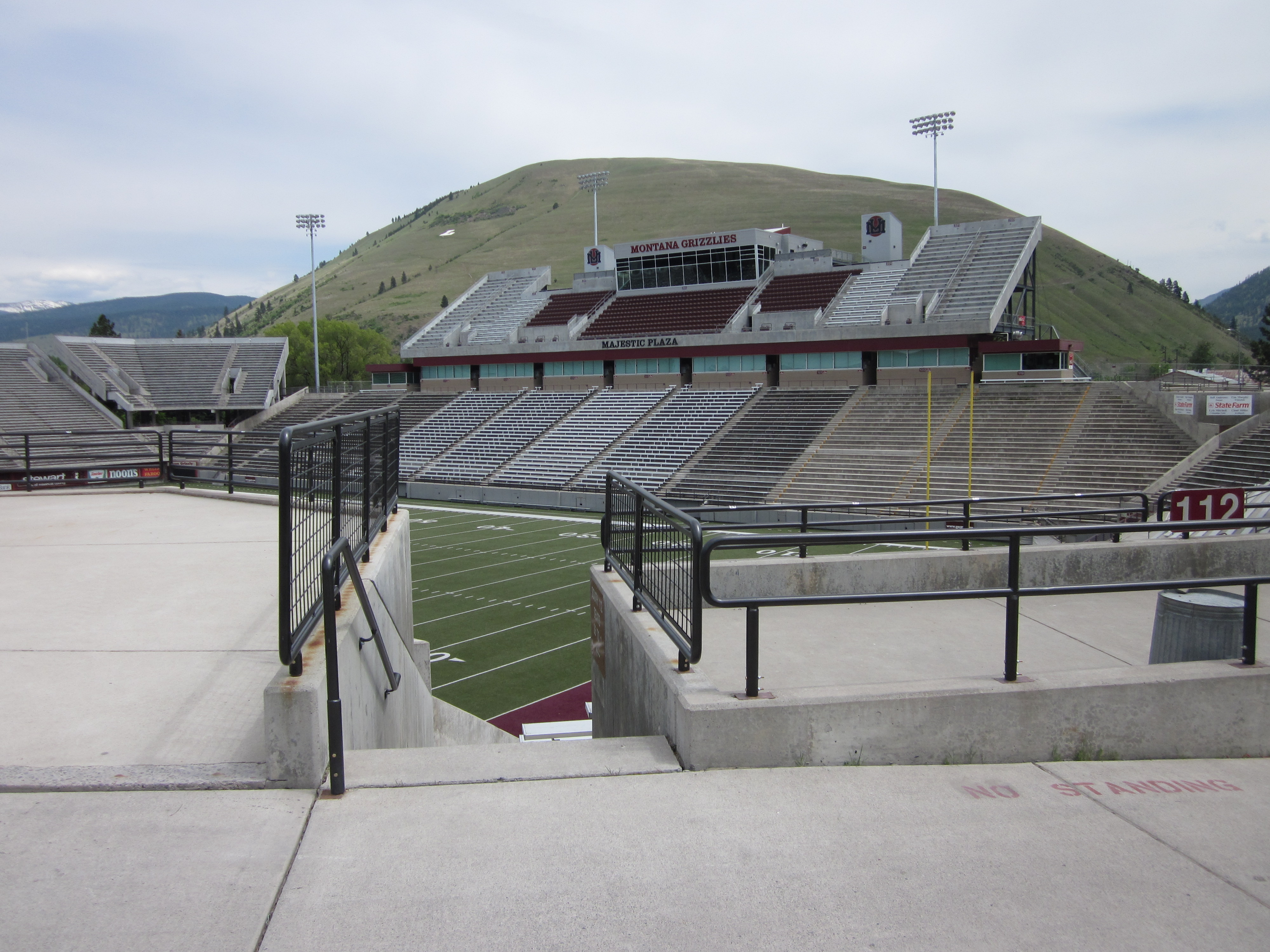
Montana Grizzlies football at Washington–Grizzly Stadium

Missoula plays host to a variety of intercollegiate, youth, and amateur sports organizations in addition to a minor league baseball team. The Montana Grizzlies' football and basketball teams of the University of Montana have the highest attendance. The Montana Grizzlies football team has a successful program within the NCAA D-1 FCS level. Their home games at Washington–Grizzly Stadium have a near 90% winning percentage and average over 25,000 spectators in attendance. All games are televised throughout Montana. The Grizzlies men's and Lady Griz basketball teams have also been successful at the conference level, where they both rank at or near the top in attendance, about 4,000 and 3,000, respectively, and play their home games at Dahlberg Arena.

Missoula is home to the Missoula PaddleHeads who play in the Rocky Mountain-based Pioneer Baseball League. They play their home games at Ogren Park at Allegiance Field.

Since 1977, Missoula has also held "Maggotfest", a festival-style rugby tournament hosted by the Missoula Maggots Rugby Club the first weekend in May. The non-elimination tournament focuses on the fun aspect of the game, attracting 36 teams (male and female) from around the United States and Canada. In regular-season play, the Missoula Maggots compete as part of the Montana Rugby Union alongside another local rugby team, the University of Montana Jesters.

The Thomas Meagher Hurling Club are also based in Missoula and play in the Northwestern division of the USGAA. The club are named after the late Irish nationalist and former acting Territorial Governor of Montana, Thomas Francis Meagher.

== Parks and recreation ==
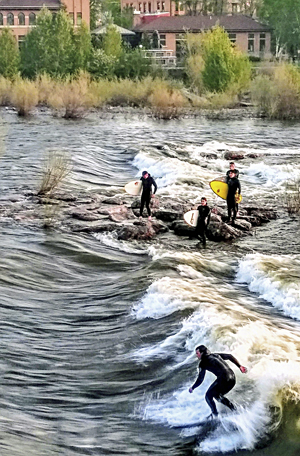
Brennan's Wave in Missoula

The city has over 400 acres (160 ha) of parkland, 22 miles (35 km) of trails, and nearly 5,000 acres (2,000 ha) of conserved open space. Located at the confluence of three rivers (the Clark Fork, Bitterroot, and Blackfoot), the area is also popular for white water rafting and, thanks largely to the novel and subsequent film A River Runs Through It by Missoula native Norman Maclean, is well known for its fly fishing. Additionally, Missoula has two aquatic parks, multiple golf courses, is home to the Adventure Cycling Association, and hosts what Runner's World called the "best overall" marathon in the U.S. There are also three ski areas within 100 miles (160 km): Montana Snowbowl, Discovery Ski Area, and Lost Trail Powder Mountain. Slightly farther away are Lookout Pass, Blacktail Mountain, and Big Mountain.

A system of public parks was developed in Missoula in 1902 with the donation by lumber baron Thomas Greenough and his wife Tessie. They gave a 42-acre (17 ha) tract of land along Rattlesnake Creek for Greenough Park, on the condition that "the land forever be used as a park and for park purposes to which the people of Missoula may . . . find a comfortable, romantic and poetic retreat". In a follow-up nine years later in a letter to the Missoulian, he stressed his interest in having the park remain in as close to a native state as possible. That request, along with the discovery that non-native Norway maples were inhibiting the growth of native trees and shrubs such as cottonwoods, ponderosa pines, and Rocky Mountain maples, led to the controversial decision to remove Norway maples from the park with the hope of returning it to its natural state.

In 1924, Bonner Park was created out of John L. Bonner's estate near the university. Today's park has multiple athletic fields and courts, and band shell used by the Missoula City band through the summer. The Kiwanis club set up a Kiwanis Park downtown in 1934, making it the first of a string of parks that line both sides of the Clark Fork River. One of those parks on the southern bank of the river is McCormick Park, which was created with WPA funds out of surplus highway land, a parcel from the American Hide and Fur Company, and land donated from the Kate McCormick estate. The 26-acre (11 ha) park, named for Washington J. McCormick and his wife, is home to a skate park, aquatics center, a free bike check-out, and a children's fishing pond. Other popular parks include the Jacobs Island Bark Park, a designated area for dogs to play off-leash; the Montana State veterans' memorial rose garden; Waterwise Garden, a "living laboratory" garden utilizing water conservation techniques; and Splash Montana Waterpark at Playfair Park.

=== Caras Park ===
Caras Park is located just south of the historic Wilma Theatre downtown. It is located on land reclaimed when the Higgins Avenue Bridge was widened from two lanes to four in 1962. Before the reclamation, the Clark Fork River divided to create an island with the north channel's bank extending to nearby buildings such as the Wilma Theatre. The south channel was deepened for the increased water flow and the infilled land later became Caras Park. Events in the park were not common until the early 1980s and permanent fixtures such as "Out to Lunch", which began in 1986. The Missoula Downtown Association took over from Parks and Recreation to manage the park and made improvements to make Caras Park more event-friendly. Seating, event circles, brick plazas, restrooms, and storage structures were added. Large temporary tents were used for events until 1997, when a permanent pavilion was constructed. The park is a hub of city festivities including include "Out to Lunch", the International Wildlife Film Festival, First Night Missoula, Garden City BrewFest and offered intimate concert settings for artists such as Jewel, Chris Isaak, Santana, Ziggy Marley, and B.B. King. Located next to Caras Park is A Carousel for Missoula, a wooden, hand-carved and volunteer-built carousel; and Dragon Hollow, a children's recreational area adjacent to the carousel.

== Government and politics ==
City Council
Mayor	Andrea Davis
Ward 1	Bryan von Lossberg/Heidi West
Ward 2	Sierra Farmer/Mirtha Becerra
Ward 3	Daniel Carlino/Gwen Jones
Ward 4	Jesse Ramos/Jon Dibari
Ward 5	Stacie Anderson/Julie Armstrong
Ward 6	Julie Meritt/Michelle Cares
Missoula's state delegation (Senate)
SD 46	Sue Malek (D)
SD 47	Dick Barrett (D)
SD 48	Tom Facey (D)
SD 49	David Wanzenried (D)
SD 50	Cliff Larsen (D)
(House of Representatives)
HD 91	Chuck Erickson (R)
HD 92	Bryce Bennett (D)
HD 93	Douglas Coffin (D)
HD 94	Ellie Hill (D)
HD 95	Tom Steenberg (D)
HD 96	Carolyn Squires (D)
HD 97	Nancy Wilson (D)
HD 98	Jenifer Gursky (D)
HD 99	Kimberly Dudik (D)
HD 100	Zooey Zephyr (D)

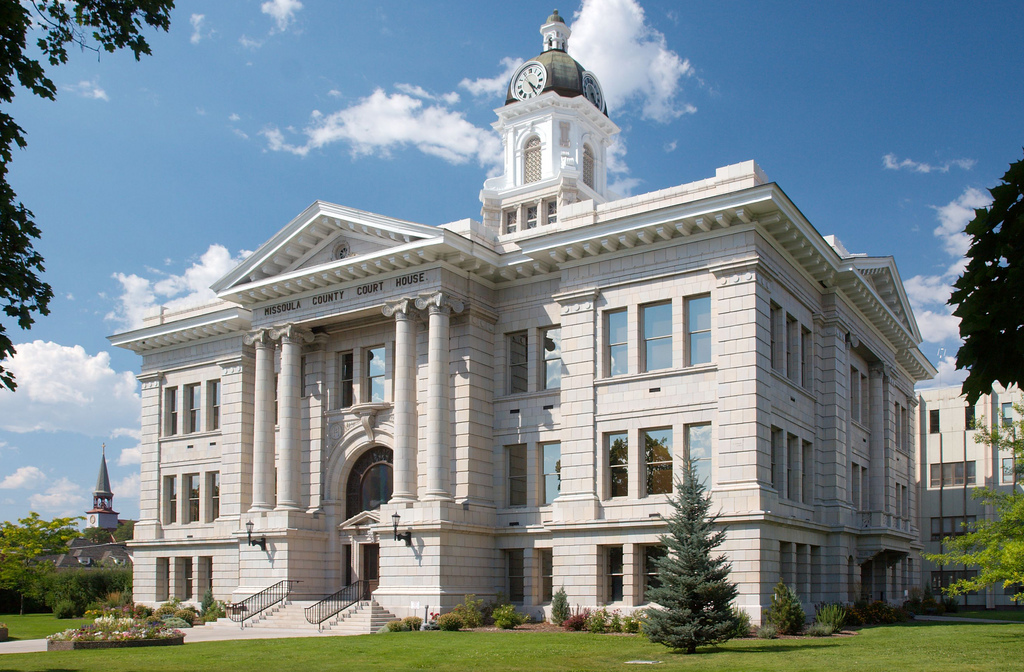
Missoula county courthouse

Missoula's system of government has changed four times since 1883, when an aldermanic form of government was approved with the town charter. The city adopted a commission-council form of government in 1911 with the opening of new City Hall and a council–manager government in 1954 before returning to an aldermanic form of government in 1959. Since January 1, 1997, Missoula has been governed in accordance with the Missoula City Charter, which calls for a mayor–council system of government.

The current system comprises a mayor and city treasurer elected in a citywide vote and 12 city council members who must reside in and are elected from one of six wards, with each ward having two council members. All positions are nominally nonpartisan. Council members and the mayor are elected to four-year terms with council-member elections being staggered to allow only one member from each ward to up for re-election. No term limits exist for either position.

Missoula's state legislative delegation is the second-largest in the Montana Legislature and is represented by districts 91–100 in the Montana House of Representatives and districts 46–50 in the Montana Senate. It has 14 Democrats and only one Republican in its state legislative delegation.

Missoula is often considered the most liberal city in Montana. Though its political leanings may not be unique for a college town, various initiatives by city government have been at odds with the rest of the state, including efforts to make marijuana possession the lowest priority of law enforcement in 2006, and symbolic resolutions calling on Congress to withdraw from Iraq in 2007, and to amend the U.S. Constitution to declare that "corporations are not human beings" in 2011. In 2011, the Montana legislature, with a Republican House majority, attempted to overturn Missoula's marijuana law and revoke its ability to have an anti-discrimination ordinance that included the LGBT community. The marijuana repeal was vetoed by then-Governor Brian Schweitzer and the attempt to repeal the anti-discrimination ordinance died in the State Senate.

== Education ==
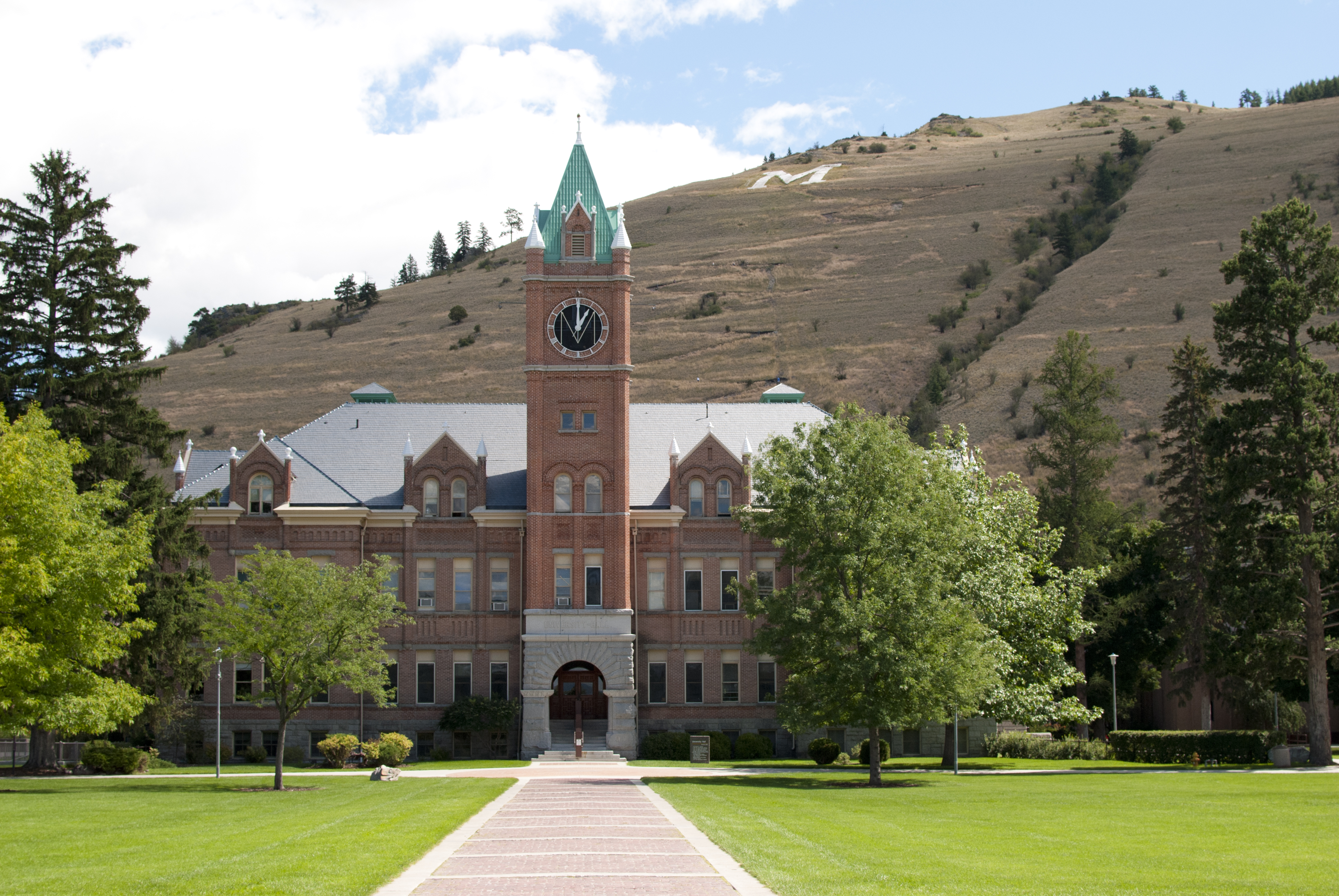
The University of Montana campus, showing Mount Sentinel with The M logo

Missoula's first school was opened in late 1869 with 16 students from around the region and their teacher Emma C. Slack, who had come to Missoula by a two-month trip by horseback, railroad, and boat from Baltimore at the invitation of her brother. She resigned two years later upon marrying William H. H. Dickinson (the first couple married in Missoula) and was replaced by Elizabeth Countryman, who later married Missoula's first mayor, Frank H. Woody. The first public high school was opened in 1904, but was converted back to a grade school after the A. J. Gibson-designed Missoula County High School (now Hellgate High School) was opened in 1908. After several expansions, Stanford University was commissioned in 1951 to create a master building plan to manage future growth. It suggested purchasing land and building an additional campus at the Garden City Airport's Hale Field, which was gradually being replaced by the Missoula County Airport, which was then southwest of town. The new school (now Sentinel High School) was opened in 1957. Initially, the two campuses were separated between upper and lower classmen with upper classmen in the new school, but in 1965, the two campuses became separate high schools. In 1974, the private Loyola Sacred Heart Catholic High School was created from a merger of the all-girls Sacred Heart Academy (est. 1873) and the all-boys Loyola High School (est. 1912). In 1980, Missoula's third public high school, Big Sky, was established.

Missoula County Public Schools has two components: Missoula Elementary School District and Missoula High School District. The city of Missoula is divided between the following elementary school districts: Most of Missoula is in Missoula Elementary School District while other portions are in Hellgate Elementary School District, DeSmet Elementary School District, Target Range Elementary School District, and Bonner Elementary School District. All residents are in the Missoula High School District. The school district numbers of the districts are districts 1 (Missoula), 4 (Hellgate), 20 (DeSmet), and 23 (Target Range). In Missoula, there are nine public elementary schools (kindergarten to 5th grade), three public middle schools (6th to 8th grades), four public high schools (9th to 12th grades), and three public schools serving kindergarten to 8th grade. Missoula also has several private schools including an international school, religious-affiliated schools, as well as Next Step Prep, a theater academy high school operated by the Missoula Children's Theatre.

The University of Montana dominates higher education in Missoula. The university, established in 1893, was Montana's first, and has the state's second-largest enrollment, with 12,922 students as of 2015. The campus houses six colleges and three schools including Montana's first and only law school, the Alexander Blewett III School of Law. The university is also the location of the state's Regional Federal Depository Library, and houses the state Arboretum. The University of Montana College of Technology, established in 1956 and formerly known as the Missoula Vocational Technical Center, offers fast-track learning programs. Multiple vocational programs not affiliated with the university ranging from photography and massage to truck driving also have a presence in Missoula.

Missoula has a public library, the Missoula Public Library.

== Media ==
=== Broadcast ===
Missoula's single–broadcast over–air television media market is the largest in Montana and ranked 165 nationally as of 2015. Though Missoula itself is second in population to Billings, Montana, Missoula's single-broadcast over-air television media market includes all of Missoula, Ravalli, Granite, Mineral, Lake, Flathead, and Sanders Counties in the more densely populated western region of Montana and serves over 112,600 television homes as of 2015. Missoula is home to three local affiliate channels: KPAX-TV (CBS/MTN; founded 1970; channel 8), KECI-TV (NBC; founded 1954 as KGVO-TV; channel 13), and KTMF-TV (ABC, FOX; founded 1991; channel 23). Also based in Missoula at the University of Montana is Montana PBS (founded 1984; channel 11).

=== Print and online ===
Missoula has three main sources of print and digital media: the Missoulian (daily), The Missoula Current (daily), and Montana Kaimin (college). The Missoulian was founded as a weekly publication in 1870 as The Missoula and Cedar Creek Pioneer and remains the city's oldest news product. The Missoula Current was founded in 2015 and provides local and regional coverage and is the state's largest digital-only news product. The Montana Kaimin (founded 1891) is distributed for free throughout parts of Missoula with heavy student traffic from the University of Montana, where the newspaper is printed weekly every Thursday during the school year.

== Infrastructure ==
=== Health care ===
Missoula has two primary health care facilities: St. Patrick Hospital and Health Sciences Center and Community Medical Center. St. Patrick's was founded in 1873 under the sponsorship of the Sisters of Providence. It is the only Level II trauma center in western Montana and has undergone three major expansions since the 1980s. The hospital has 195 acute-care beds and admitted over 9,700 patients in 2003. The name was changed from "St. Patrick Hospital" to "St. Patrick Hospital and Health Sciences Center" in 2000 to reflect an increasing involvement with national medical research and education. The Community Medical Center and its adjacent medical facilities are located near Fort Missoula and is part of a modern complex that includes a nursing home, the Missoula Crippled Children's Center, and private offices. It was founded in 1922 as Thornton Hospital by doctors Will Thornton and Charles Thornton and has been at its current location since 1972. Although originally a locally owned, nonprofit hospital, it is now owned by a large corporation headquartered in Nashville, Tennessee, and is a for-profit entity. It is the only hospital in Western Montana with a separate Pediatric Intensive Care Unit. The center is partnered with Seattle Children's Hospital. The nearest Level I trauma center to Missoula is Harborview Medical Center in Seattle, Washington.

=== Utilities ===
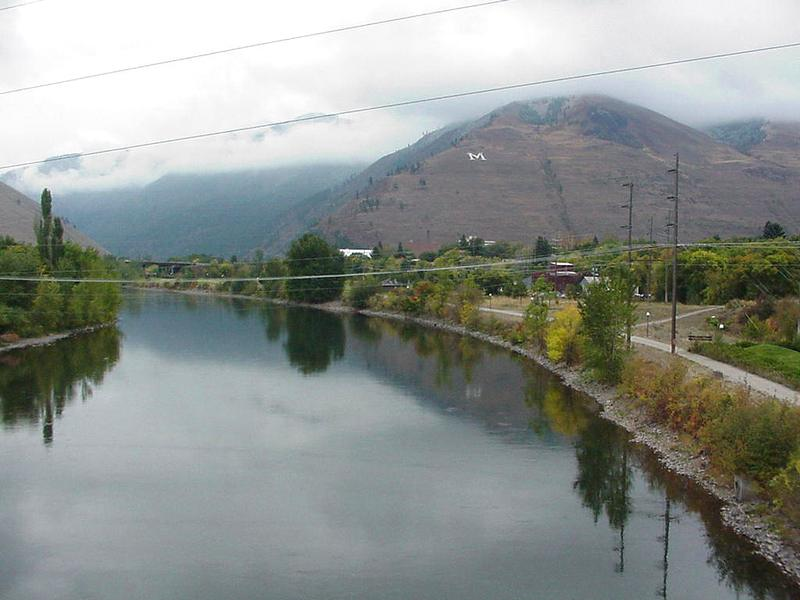
Power lines crossing the Clark Fork River east of the Higgins Avenue Bridge

The earliest Missoulians drew their water directly from the Clark Fork River or nearby Rattlesnake Creek. The first water system consisted of a Native American known as One-Eyed Riley and his friend filling buckets of water from the Rattlesnake Creek and hauling them door to door on a donkey cart. In 1871 city co-founder Frank Worden began construction of a long pipe and wooden main system that flowed from the Rattlesnake Creek 2.5 miles (4 km) north of the city. With the addition of two small covered reservoirs, the first municipal water system was begun in 1880. With an intake dam built-in 1901 with a settling basin capacity of 3 million US gallons (11,000 m^{3}), the Rattlesnake Creek continued to meet the demands of the city until 1935 when five wells were added to respond to increased summer and fall demand. This system is still maintained as an emergency backup but was discontinued as a primary source after Giardia outbreak in 1983. Since then, Missoula has relied on the Missoula Valley Aquifer as the sole source of water. In 1889, the first electrical plant was built by A. B. Hammond to power his major downtown properties such as the Missoula Mercantile and the Florence Hotel. In 1905, the Missoula Mercantile (by then owned by Copper King William A. Clark purchased the water system and consolidated it with its vast electrical holdings to create the Missoula Light and Water Company (ML&W) a year later. Electricity and water remained bundled after ML&W's sale to the Montana Power Company (MPC) in 1929. In 1979, MPC sold its water utility holdings as Mountain Water Company to Park Water Company in Downey, California, which since 2011 has been a subsidiary of The Carlyle Group. In 2015, the City of Missoula was legally granted its "'right to acquire' the water system by exercising its power of eminent domain", but as of June 2017 the decision was upheld by a district court.

Following the deregulation of Montana's electricity market in 1997, Montana Power Company began to divest its energy business. MPC sold substantially all its electrical generating assets to the PPL Corporation in December 1997 and its energy transmission and distribution business to NorthWestern Corporation in February 2002. Despite filing for bankruptcy in 2002, NorthWestern Corporation's subsidiary NorthWestern Energy is the primary provider of electric and natural gas service to Missoula in addition to the Rural Utilities Service's Missoula Electric Cooperative.

Local telephone service in the area is provided by CenturyLink and Blackfoot Telecommunications. Major cell phone providers include AT&T, Sprint, Verizon, and T-Mobile. Allied Waste handles recycling through a program where customers can purchase special blue bags to designate recyclables. Recycling has also been offered by Missoula Valley Recycling since 1992, by Garden City Recycling since 2010 which offers curbside pickup, and by Pacific Steel & Recycling which offers drop-off recycling. Sewer service is handled by the City of Missoula Wastewater Division.

=== City layout and development ===
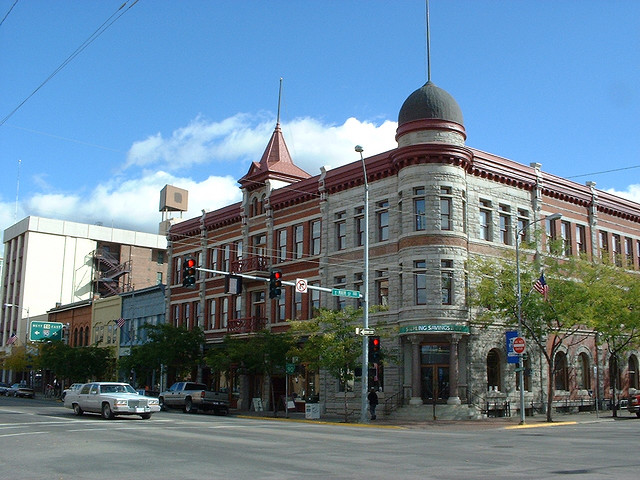
Higgins Block in Downtown Missoula

In the mid-1860s, C. P. Higgins and Frank Worden began plotting what would become the town of Missoula along the Mullan Military Road, which ran parallel to the Clark Fork River. Through downtown Missoula, the route of the road is now Front Street. It is intersected by Higgins Avenue, to which a bridge across the Clark Fork was added in 1873. The intersection of these two streets became the default center of the city, and remains the numerical center regarding city street addresses. The arrival of the Northern Pacific Railway in 1883 led to a housing boom along the tracks, particularly on the northern side where many of the railway workers would reside. When the Higgins Avenue Bridge was replaced in 1893, they debated whether the bridge should continue southwest toward the Bitterroot Valley as it had earlier or due south. Attorneys W. M. Bickford and W. J. Stephens had already laid out plots of land five years earlier for what they hoped would be a new town of "South Missoula". The streets there were perpendicular to the Bitterroot Wagon Road. In contrast, Judge Hiram Knowles who owned the land just south of the river preferred the north–south plan and did not want to become part of South Missoula.

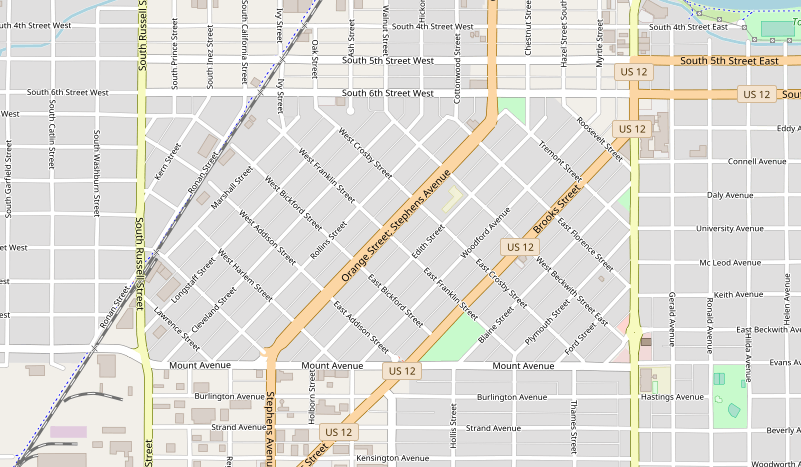
The "Slant Streets"

The result was a 7×14–block area along the west side of Higgins Avenue commonly referred to as the "Slant Streets" centered along what is now Stephens Avenue. Stephens Avenue and Brooks Street are the only arterials to traverse the city diagonally along with the Bitterroot Branch of Montana Rail Link. With the exception of Downtown, the rest of the city, where streets follow the angle of the river, and newer expansions into the hills, strictly follow the grid plan. With the establishment of the University of Montana in 1893 and the announcement that the tracks of the Milwaukee Road would be located south of the river, houses began to spread quickly throughout the university and south side districts. The area near the university was promoted as high-end and luxurious homes appeared on Hammond Avenue (then nicknamed "Millionaires Row" and known today as Gerald Avenue).

The arrival of Interstate 90 in the mid-1960s forced the removal of 60 homes, including the Greenough Mansion. The north side of Missoula became isolated between the Interstate and the tracks while the Greenough Mansion was moved to a South Hills golf course and converted to a restaurant. This dichotomy has prevailed with the North Side feeling neglected by the city while the South Hills became an upscale neighborhood. The Missoula Downtown Master Plan of 2009 emphasized redevelopment of the North Side's former rail yard and the area just south of the tracks.

The city is divided into 18 neighborhood councils, of which all Missoula residents are members. The city further contains 10 historical districts: Downtown Missoula, East Pine Street, Fort Missoula, Lower Rattlesnake, McCormick, Northside, Southside, University Area, and the campus of the University of Montana.

==== Trail system ====
Missoula has an extensive trail system for both commuting and recreation that extends over 22 miles (35 km). The city is actively trying to connect its various sections within the city to each other and to recreational trails extending beyond the city. The heart of the Missoula Commuter Bike Network is the trails along either side of the Clark Fork River that link Downtown with surrounding neighborhoods, the university, city parks, and outlying open space with smooth surfaces and three bicycle/pedestrian bridges. The most southern of these is Milwaukee Trail, which follows the former Milwaukee Railroad and continues east out of town as the Kim Williams Nature Trail beside Mount Sentinel. The Bitterroot Branch Trail connects to the Riverfront trails west of Downtown and, when completed, will provide a trail from Downtown to Southgate Mall. Near the Bitterroot Branch Trail, but not connected, is the South Avenue Trail on the west side of Reserve Street that connects the Community Medical Center with Fort Missoula, nearby athletic fields, and the Bitterroot River. The South Hills neighborhood has its own system of trails that is also approaching, but not quite meeting, the larger network.

=== Transportation ===
==== Highways ====
Interstate 90 runs east–west along the northern edge of Missoula at the base of the North Hills, with all but a small portion of the city located south of the highway. Completed in 1965 at the expense of 60 homes, the Garden City Brewery, and the Greenough Mansion, I‑90 has four city exits and makes connections with U.S. Route 93, U.S. Route 12 and Montana Highway 200. The original U.S. 12, approved by the AASHO in 1939 to extend west into Montana, did not include Missoula until the highway was rerouted along State Route 6 in October 1959 and was not extended west from Missoula until 1962. The road now crosses Missoula southwest–northeast. U.S. 93 serves as a major economic corridor for western Montana, connecting Missoula with the Bitterroot Valley communities to the south and Flathead Lake, Kalispell, and Glacier National Park to the north. Montana Highway 200, the longest state highway in the United States, enters Missoula from the east and provides access along the Blackfoot River and a direct route to Great Falls.

==== Transit ====
Public transportation in Missoula began as early as 1890 with a horse-drawn streetcar system (electrified in 1910) operated by the Missoula Street Railway Company that connected Downtown Missoula with the university, Bonner, the fairgrounds, and Fort Missoula. These streetcars were then replaced by buses in 1932 due to cost. Bus service today is provided by Mountain Line, a public transit agency created by public vote in 1976 as part of the Missoula Urban Transportation District (MUTD) that began operation in December 1977. Mountain Line operates 14 bus routes within a 36-square-mile (93 km^{2}) area, serving Missoula, East Missoula, Bonner, Target Range, Rattlesnake, and the airport. Additionally the line has offered paratransit services since 1991 to assist the disabled, senior van since 2008, and has four park‑and‑ride lots throughout Missoula. Special bus service is offered to the University of Montana through three of the city's park‑and‑ride lots in addition to a late-night UDASH shuttle that offers service between the university and Downtown. As of January 2015 a three-year pilot program of zero-fare transportation on all Mountain Line buses began, with the goal of increasing ridership by 45 percent.

==== Bus lines ====
Direct intercity ground travel needs are provided by bus carrier Jefferson Lines.

==== Railroads ====
Intercity rail travel was available from 1883, when the Northern Pacific Railway began service through Missoula, until 1979 when Amtrak discontinued its North Coast Hiawatha route across southern Montana. In 1901, the Northern Pacific built their station at the terminus of Higgins Avenue; since 1985, it has been on the National Register of Historic Places. The Chicago, Milwaukee, St. Paul and Pacific Railroad built their "Pacific Extension" through Missoula, and that station was listed on the National Register of Historic Places in 1982.

A feasibility study was commissioned by Congress in 2008 to examine the merits of reopening the North Coast Hiawatha, but as of 2008, the nearest rail station to Missoula is the Whitefish station of Amtrak's Empire Builder, 136 miles (219 km) to the north.

==== Bicycles ====
In 2009, the Missoula metropolitan statistical area (MSA) ranked as the fifth highest in the United States for percentage of commuters who biked to work (5 percent). In 2013, the Missoula MSA ranked as the tenth lowest in the United States for percentage of workers who commuted by private automobile (77.2 percent). In the same year, 8.5 percent of Missoula area commuters walked to work.

==== Airport ====
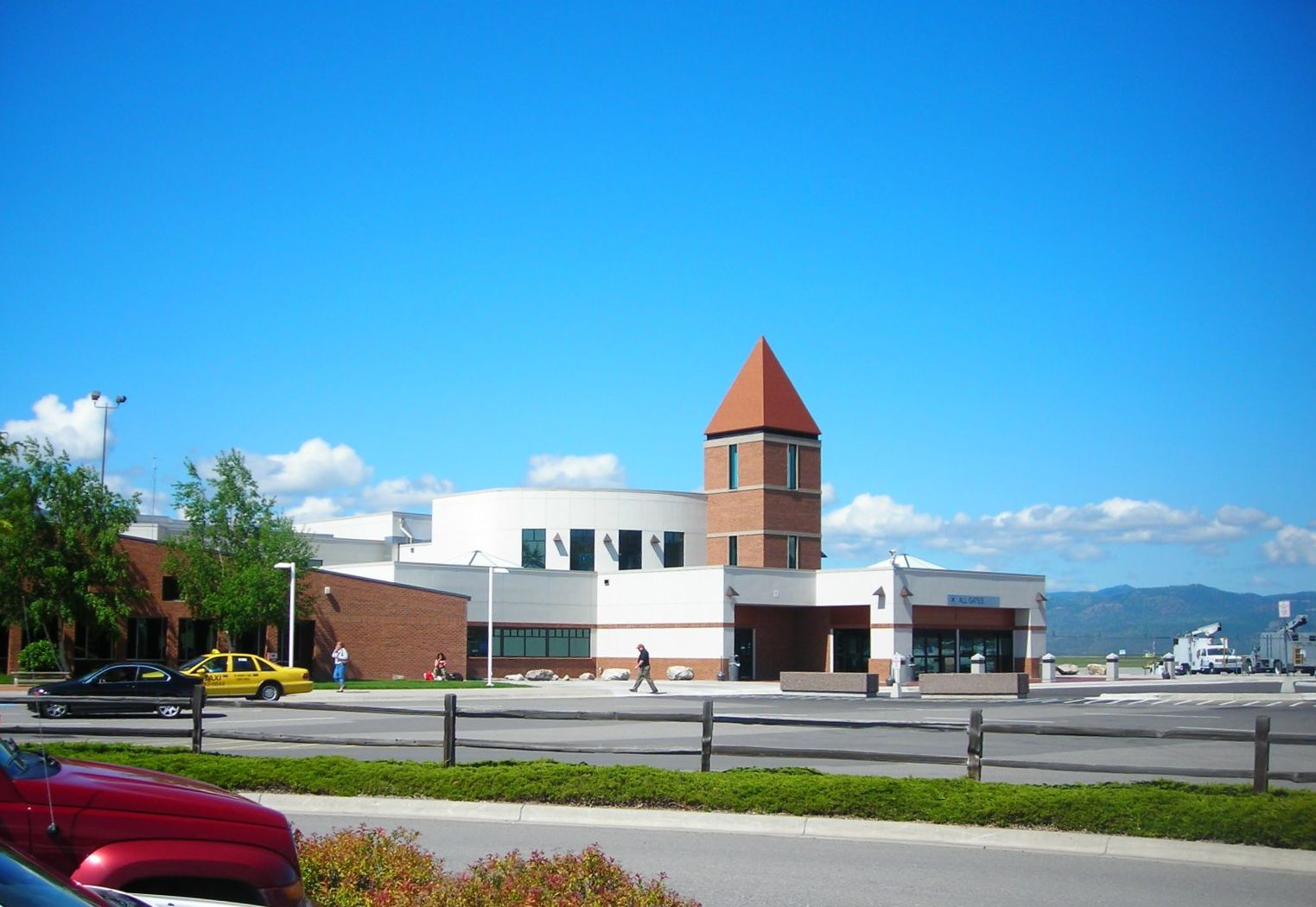
Missoula International Airport

In 1927, air travel to Missoula began; today the city is served by Missoula Montana Airport, a public airport run by the Missoula County Airport Authority. It is the largest airport in western Montana, serving 913,198 passengers in 2023. The current building contains three jet bridges and three ground‑level boarding gates.

== Notable people ==
Missoula has produced and been home to a number of notable individuals in varying fields. Its natives and residents are referred to as "Missoulians". In politics, Jeannette Rankin, the first woman in Congress, was born and raised in Missoula while Senators Mike Mansfield, the U.S.'s longest serving Senate Majority Leader, and Max Baucus, Montana's longest serving U.S. Senator both established careers and joined politics while living in the city.

Noted athletes who were born or resided in Missoula include five Olympic medalists, Pro Football Hall of Fame Quarterback John Elway, and former Milwaukee Bucks coach Larry Krystkowiak.

Filmmaker David Lynch, actor Dana Carvey, and award-winning biologist Leroy Hood were born in Missoula, while Carroll O'Connor and J. K. Simmons attended the University of Montana. Composer David Maslanka lived in Missoula. Musician Jeff Ament and YouTuber, science communicator, novelist, and entrepreneur Hank Green reside in Missoula. Academically, Missoula has been home to Nobel Prize winners Harold C. Urey and Steve Running as well as 20th-century Montana historian K. Ross Toole.

Noted names in literature include Native American poet James Welch, crime novelist James Crumley, former head of the University of Montana's Creative Writing Program Richard Hugo, William Kittredge, a western writer and professor of creative writing at the University of Montana at Missoula, and Norman Maclean, whose A River Runs Through It chronicles his life in early 20th-century Missoula. Joanna Klink, poet and professor at the University of Montana. Michael Punke, the author of the best-selling novel The Revenant, also lives in Missoula.

== Sister cities ==
Missoula has two sister cities, as designated by Sister Cities International:

- Neckargemünd, Baden-Württemberg, Germany
- Palmerston North, New Zealand

Missoula's Sister City relationship with Palmerston North, New Zealand, began after Missoula resident and later University of Montana professor Harold Bockemuehl returned from obtaining his PhD from Massey University. The relationship was made official in 1983 after a meeting between then UM President Neil Bucklew and officials from Massey University. Each May, Missoula celebrates "New Zealand Day" in honor of the relationship with rugby, food, and entertainment. Missoula's second Sister City relationship began in 1991 after a Neckargemünd delegation, led by Mayor Oskar Schuster, visited Missoula following a Fulbright-sponsored faculty exchange between Heidelberg University and the University of Montana. Every September the Missoula Cultural Council holds an annual "Germanfest" to celebrate German culture and this relationship.

== Portrayal in media ==
... the world outside, which my brother and I soon discovered was full of bastards, the number increasing rapidly the farther one gets from Missoula, Montana.

— Norman Maclean, A River Runs Through It

Author Norman Maclean grew up in Missoula and wrote about it in his 1976 autobiographical novella A River Runs Through It. The work was adapted into a 1992 motion picture of the same name, directed by Robert Redford and starring Brad Pitt and Craig Sheffer.

Missoula: Rape and the Justice System in a College Town, a 2015 book by Jon Krakauer, focused on a series of sexual assault cases between 2010 and 2012 and the way that the Missoula Police Department, the Missoula County Attorney's Office, and the University of Montana handled those cases. Missoula's handling of rape cases sparked a Justice Department's investigation that found a "pattern of disrespect and indifference toward alleged victims" by Missoula law enforcement, prosecutors, and the university, with scathing blame directed at the Attorney's Office. While being interviewed on NPR about the book, Krakauer stated, "I don't mean to single out Missoula: Its rape rate is a little less than the national average; I think its problems with dealing with rape are pretty depressingly typical." Nevertheless, reporting by Krakauer and local and national journalists showed what they characterized as a troubling pattern of authorities mishandling investigations, treating victims with hostility and suspicion, reflexively protecting alleged perpetrators at the expense of victims, declining to prosecute large numbers of credible rape allegations, and creating an atmosphere where victims were unlikely to come forward after an attack. Krakauer placed a significant portion of the blame for the mishandling of rape prosecutions on a single Deputy County Attorney, Kirsten Pabst, who now serves as the Missoula County Attorney. The book also charted deep divisions within the town about the allegations, particularly those involving football players from the Montana Grizzlies.

There is a lengthy study of Missoula in the title essay of British writer Jonathan Raban's Driving Home: An American Journey: despite writing that on his arrival, "I had the powerful impression that I had driven deep into the Rocky Mountains and somehow arrived in Rotherham or Barnsley," and that "the overall effect [of the city] was oddly unsettling; the streets too open for comfort, the town too closed in, inducing mild claustrophobia and agoraphobia at the same time", he notes the literary heritage of the city and its reputation as a "kindly town" (evidenced by its being a place where "odds and ends naturally collected and cohered").

Missoula is mentioned as being the closest city to the fictional Hope County in Far Cry 5. The game's second mission involves the player trying to escape the county to reach Missoula.

The Harkema Industrial Park in Project Wingman, a complex of ocean platforms, is constructed over a post-Calamity submerged Missoula.

== See also ==
- USS Missoula, two ships
