= Millicent Bandmann-Palmer =

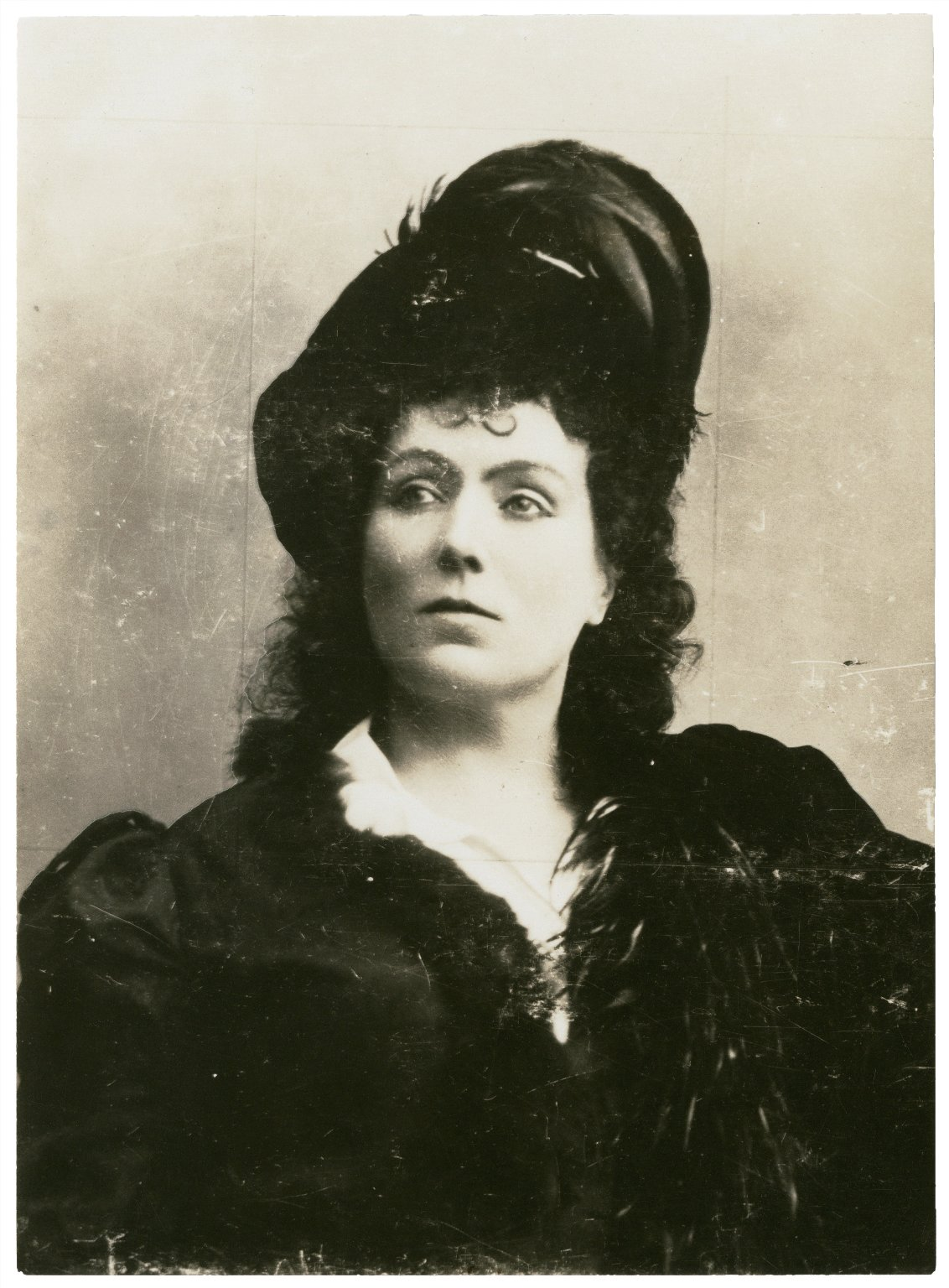
Bandmann-Palmer as Hamlet

Millicent Bandmann-Palmer (1845–1926) was an English actress. She appeared in leading roles, particularly in those of Shakespeare.

== Life ==
Millicent Palmer was born in Lancaster, and initially became well known as an actress at the Theatre Royal in Liverpool.

Her first London appearance was at the Royal Strand Theatre in November 1864, as Pauline in the play Delicate Ground. A reviewer in The Standard (9 November 1864) wrote: "The romance and simplicity of Pauline were exquisitely represented by Miss Palmer, who, without an effort, and in a style very different to what the visitors to the Strand Theatre have been accustomed to see, made a deep impression, and appealed to all hearts. The tenderness of the character, too, was exquisitely realised, nor were energy and spirit wanting when required...."

She remained with the theatre company at the Strand until 1865, appearing successfully in two plays by J. P. Wooler, The Wilful Ward and Laurence's Love Suit, the last of which was reviewed in The Athenaeum (14 January 1865): "The same lively sensible girl to whom humour seemed as natural as the most spontaneous act of her daily life, possesses also a fund of pathos so genuine in character, so unstudied, yet so effective, that it commands voluntary sympathy from all classes of spectators...."

In October 1866 at the Olympic Theatre she played the leading female role in the first production of Tom Taylor's The White Boy. From November 1867 for five weeks at the Lyceum Theatre, London she played Juliet in Shakespeare's Romeo and Juliet, with great success.

In February 1869 she married the actor Daniel E. Bandmann, and afterwards they appeared together in plays. They travelled to Australia and the US; during these tours she played roles including Pauline in The Lady of Lyons by Edward Bulwer-Lytton, and several from Shakespeare: Juliet in Romeo and Juliet, Beatrice in Much Ado About Nothing and Portia in The Merchant of Venice. They had a daughter and a son (Maurice, born 1877); they later divorced.

She returned to England, appearing in 1872 In London at the Queen's Theatre, Long Acre; in 1873 she appeared at the Princess's Theatre as Lady Macbeth. In the following years she appeared in London and elsewhere in England, playing leading roles, in Shakespeare and in other plays, including Lady Teazle in Sheridan's The School for Scandal.
