= Mount Jumbo =

Mountain in Montana, United States

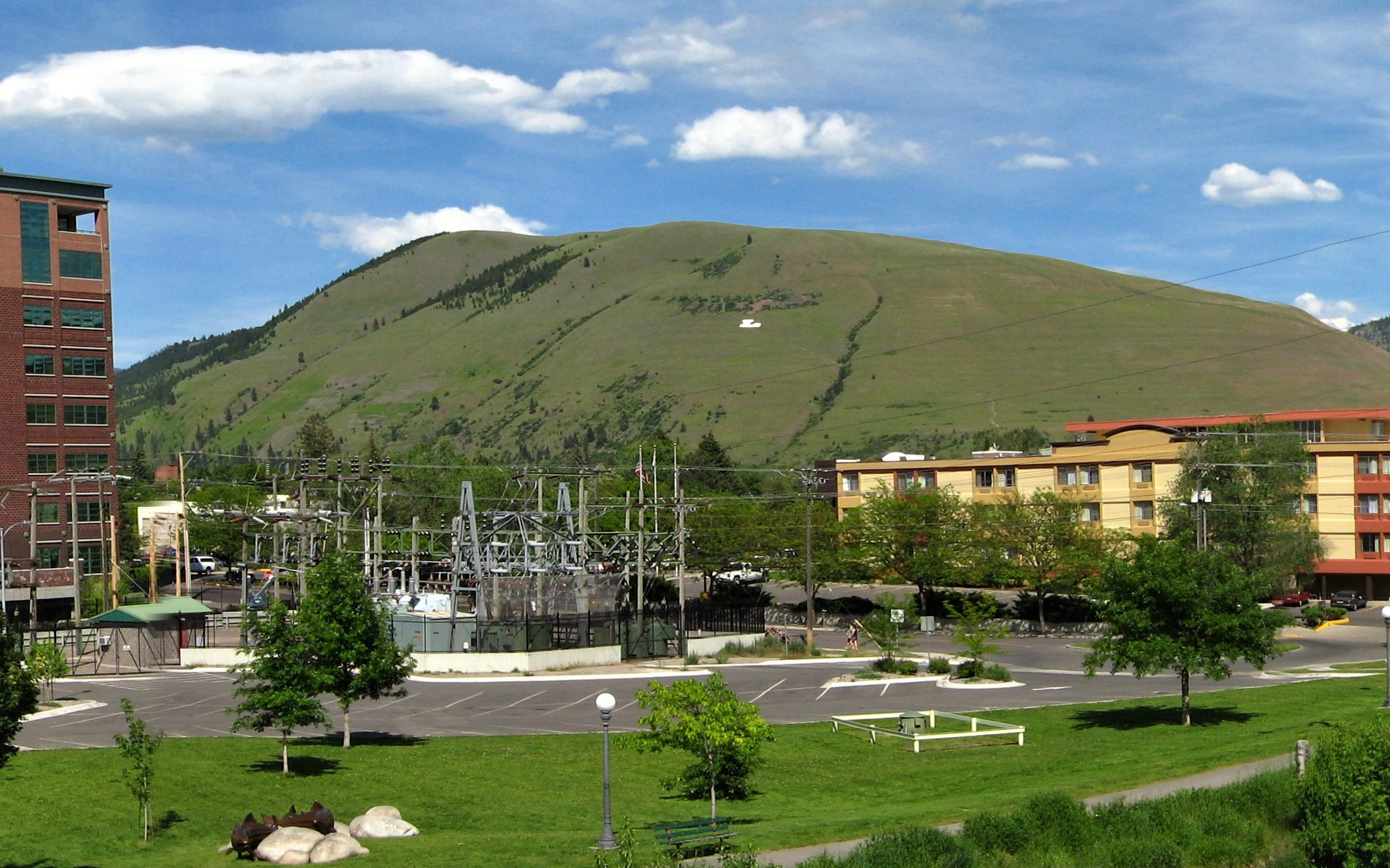

Highest point
- Elevation: 4,768 ft (1,453 m)
- Prominence: 808 ft (246 m)
- Coordinates: 46°52′45″N 113°57′23″W

Geography
- Location within Montana
- Location: Missoula County, Montana, U.S.
- Parent range: Rattlesnake Mountains, Rocky Mountain Front
- Topo map: USGS Northeast Missoula

Climbing
- Easiest route: Hike via old logging roads

Mount Jumbo (Salish: Sin Min Koos, meaning "obstacle" or "thing in the way"), also called Mount Loyola by some locals, is a mountain overlooking the city of Missoula in the U.S. state of Montana. It is northeast of the city's downtown and, in its majority, is publicly owned. In 1996, Jumbo was purchased from private landowners and protected from development. Funding for this purchase came from an open space bond, federal and non-profit agencies and thousands of local contributors. Additional land parcels have been purchased since then, increasing the easement to 1,800 acres (730 ha).

== Natural history ==
Glacial Lake Missoula

Between 15,000 and 13,000 years ago, Glacial Lake Missoula formed when an ice sheet blocked the Clark Fork River, damming up the river's water back into the valleys of western Montana. The dam would periodically burst causing a flood of water to rush across Idaho, Washington and Oregon to the Pacific Ocean. This lake contained about 2,100 cubic kilometres (500 cu mi) of water, half the volume of Lake Michigan. These dramatic drops in water levels caused the distinct glacial lake shoreline marks that are still visible from the floor of the Missoula Valley on the face of Mount Jumbo and neighboring Mount Sentinel.

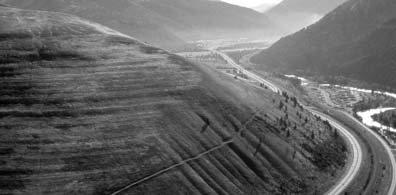
Wave-cut strandlines cut into the slope at left in photo. These cuts record former high-water lines, or shorelines. Gullies above the highway are the result of modern-day erosion. (NPS Photo)

== Naming ==
David Thompson, an English-Canadian fur trader, ignoring the Salish name already given, renamed the hill 'Brown Knowl' when he climbed in on February 26, 1812. Later, eastern settlers thought Mount Jumbo looked like a sleeping elephant. Locals saw the landform as a reclining elephant with its rump in the Clark Fork and its trunk pointing north toward the Rattlesnake Mountains; the round grassy mountain became known as 'Elephant Hill.' Miners christened a nearby copper mine 'Jumbo Lode' in honor of Barnum and Bailey's most famous attraction Jumbo, the largest elephant in the world, which Barnum acquired in 1882. The feature was later renamed Mount Jumbo.

In the 19th Century, Jesuit priests that settled in the Missoula Valley referred to the mountain as Mount Loyola after St. Ignatius of Loyola. The Roman Catholic school named Loyola Sacred Heart, founded by Jesuit priests, was then opened in Missoula in 1873.

== Protective Efforts ==
In 1995, Missoula citizens approved a $5 million bond to preserve open, natural areas in the county. A year later, $2 million from that bond and another $1.5 million raised by Montana Fish, Wildlife and Parks, the U.S. Forest Service, Five Valleys Land Trust, the Rocky Mountain Elk Foundation and local residents was used to purchase the majority of the mountain. This initial portion included 1,465 acres. Since then, additional land purchases have opened a total of 1,800 acres across Mount Jumbo to public access as well as wildlife preservation.

The primary reason for protecting Mount Jumbo in 1996 was that a dense subdivision had been approved for the mountain's saddle.

Mount Jumbo's saddle is an essential winter-feeding habitat for elk herds. Of the elk herds living near Missoula the herd on Jumbo is considered the most restricted in its movements.

Most parts of the mountain are closed during the winter to protect the elk that are under more stress at this time of year due to harsh weather and decreased food availability. The northern portion of Mount Jumbo is closed Dec. 1 until May 1, while the southern part is closed Dec. 1 to March 15.

A stabilization in Jumbo's herd size has been observed since the winter closures began in 1997.

Invasive weeds such as spotted knapweed, leafy spurge, cheatgrass, sulphur cinquefoil, Dyer's woad, and Dalmatian toadflax are established across Mount Jumbo. Numerous management programs are working to combat the invasive species spread. A non-profit organization called Working Dogs, has trained dogs to detect Dyer's Woad. After 10 years of detection work the number of this invasive plant has dropped from thousands to only 7 plants per year. Community weed-pulls organized by Missoula City as well as student, conservation and other private groups work to remove thousands of pounds of weeds from the mountain's face every year. Sheep have also been used as a management tool to graze on the unwanted species, although their efficacy is doubtful.

== Recreation ==
Hiking

- The "L" – The letter “L” cemented onto the face of Mount Jumbo represents Loyola Sacred Heart Catholic High School, situated at the base of the mountain. The trail to the “L” gains 500 feet in elevation over 1.5 miles.
- U.S. West Trail – Beginning at Cherry Street, the trail climbs the southwest face of Mount Jumbo and then extends east, paralleling interstate 90, with access to East Missoula.
- Lincoln Hills Trailhead access to the Rattlesnake National Recreation Area.

Mountain Biking

- Woods Gulch Loop
- Marshall Canyon Loop

Flora and Fauna

Fauna of interest seen on Mount Jumbo include: whitetail deer, mule deer, black bear, elk, mountain lions, coyotes, wolves, lynx, red fox, swallowtail butterflies, Blue Grouse, Lazuli Buntings, blue birds and falcons. Flora highlights include: service berry, hawthorn, ninebark, bluebunch wheatgrass, Ponderosa pine and Douglas fir. Evidence of pine beetle infestation in conifers has been observed on Mount Jumbo.
