= Milwaukee Depot =

Milwaukee Depot may refer to:

== Train stations in the City of Milwaukee, Wisconsin ==
- Milwaukee Intermodal Station
- Everett Street Depot
- Lake Front Depot

== Train stations of the Chicago, Milwaukee, St. Paul and Pacific Railroad (CMStP&P), often referred to as the "Milwaukee Road" ==
- Missoula station (Milwaukee Road)
- Minneapolis station (Milwaukee Road)
- Stations listed in Milwaukee Road Depot
- Stations listed in Category:Former Milwaukee Road stations
