= Total personal income =

Total personal income is defined by the United States' Bureau of Economic Analysis as:

income received by persons from all sources. It includes income received from participation in production as well as from government and business transfer payments. It is the sum of compensation of employees (received), supplements to wages and salaries, proprietors' income with inventory valuation adjustment (IVA) and capital consumption adjustment (CCAdj), rental income of persons with CCAdj, personal income receipts on assets, and personal current transfer receipts, less contributions for government social insurance.

Total personal income is a key value in calculating per capita income. It differs from private income in a number of ways.

== See ==
- List of countries by per capita personal income
- List of states by adjusted per capita personal income

== See also ==
- Per capita income
- Income
- Gross national income
