= Missoula station (Milwaukee Road) =

Missoula
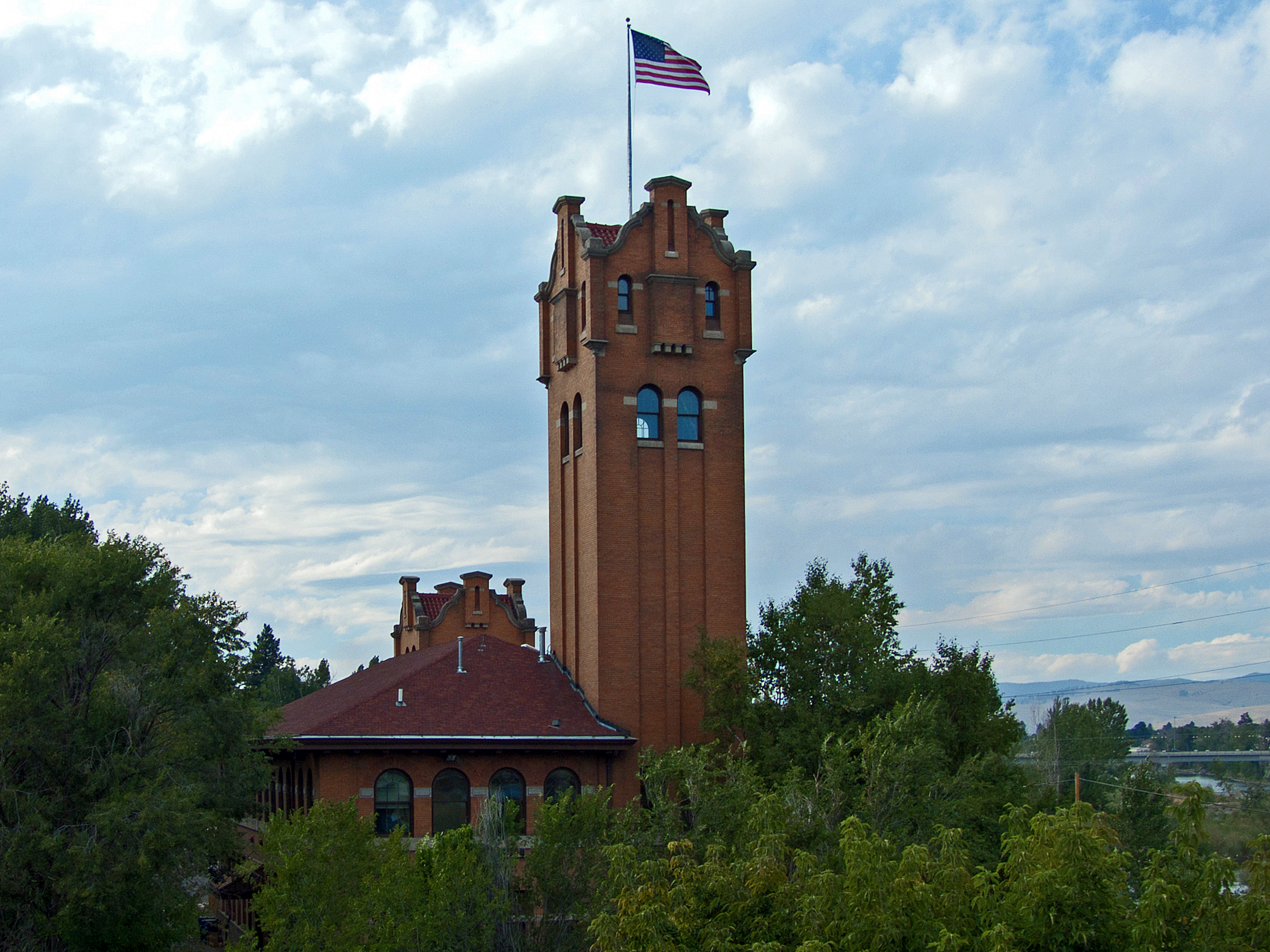
- The Milwaukee Depot in 2012

General information
- Location: 250 Station Drive, Missoula, Montana 59801
- System: Former Milwaukee Road passenger rail station

History
- Rebuilt: 1910

Services
Preceding station	Milwaukee Road	Following station
Primrose toward Seattle or Tacoma	Main Line	Bonner toward Chicago
- Milwaukee Depot
- U.S. National Register of Historic Places
- Location within Montana Location within the United States
- Location: 250 Station Drive; Missoula, Montana
- Coordinates: 46°52′03″N 113°59′53″W
- Built: 1910
- Architect: J. A. Lindstrand
- Architectural style: Mission
- NRHP reference No.: 82003175
- Added to NRHP: April 30, 1982
Location

The Milwaukee Depot in Missoula, Montana, was built by the Chicago, Milwaukee, St. Paul and Pacific Railroad (otherwise known as The Milwaukee Road) in 1910 as part of the railroad's transcontinental "Pacific Extension".

The depot complex consists of two buildings, both made of brick. The depot itself is a two-story rectangular building that had passenger waiting rooms and the station agent's office. The second floor contained railroad offices. The depot has two towers that rise above it. There is a Mission influence in the tile roofs and decoration. The second building was the baggage room.

When the railroad went bankrupt in the mid-1980s, the buildings were sold and turned into a restaurant and bar. A new addition was built that connected the depot with the baggage room. In the late 1980s, the restaurant went out of business and the building sat vacant.

In the mid-1990s, the building was bought by the Boone and Crockett Club who moved their national headquarters there from Washington, DC. The club leased the second floor to the University of Montana for use as offices.

The depot was placed on the National Register of Historic Places due to its architecture and also due to its association with the commercial development of Missoula.

== See also ==
- Milwaukee Depot (disambiguation) - Other stations known by the name
