= National Register of Historic Places listings in Missoula County, Montana =

Location of Missoula County in Montana

This is a list of the National Register of Historic Places listings in Missoula County, Montana. It is intended to be a complete list of the properties and districts on the National Register of Historic Places in Missoula County, Montana, United States. The locations of National Register properties and districts for which the latitude and longitude coordinates are included below, may be seen in a map.

There are 88 properties and districts listed on the National Register in the county, including 2 National Historic Landmarks.

This National Park Service list is complete through NPS recent listings posted November 6, 2026.

== Listings county-wide ==
| | Name on the Register | Image | Date listed | Location | City or town | Description |
|---|---|---|---|---|---|---|
| 1 | Apartment Building at 116 Spruce Street | Apartment Building at 116 Spruce Street | April 30, 1990 (#90000644) | 116 W. Spruce St. 46°52′28″N 113°59′32″W | Missoula | |
| 2 | Atlantic Hotel | Atlantic Hotel | April 30, 1990 (#90000652) | 519 N. Higgins Ave. 46°52′29″N 113°59′30″W | Missoula | |
| 3 | Bellows House | Bellows House | February 22, 1996 (#96000120) | 1637 S. Higgins Ave. 46°51′19″N 113°59′49″W | Missoula | |
| 4 | Belmont Hotel | Belmont Hotel | April 20, 1983 (#83001071) | 430 N. Higgins Ave. 46°52′25″N 113°59′30″W | Missoula | |
| 5 | Bluebird Building | Bluebird Building | August 8, 1996 (#96000881) | 220-224 N. Higgins Ave. 46°52′17″N 113°59′36″W | Missoula | |
| 6 | Brunswick Hotel | Brunswick Hotel | April 30, 1990 (#90000645) | 223 Railroad St. 46°52′35″N 113°59′37″W | Missoula | |
| 7 | Camp Paxson Boy Scout Camp (24MO77) | Camp Paxson Boy Scout Camp (24MO77) | March 21, 1986 (#86000584) | Seeley Lake; 47°11′14″N 113°31′04″W | Lolo National Forest | |
| 8 | Carlton Community Church | Carlton Community Church | September 23, 2011 (#11000701) | 20075 Old MT 93; 46°40′39″N 114°04′46″W | Florence vicinity | |
| 9 | Carnegie Public Library | Carnegie Public Library | April 30, 1982 (#82003174) | 335 N. Pattee St. 46°52′21″N 113°59′29″W | Missoula | |
| 10 | Thomas J. Christie House | Thomas J. Christie House | March 16, 1995 (#95000251) | 401 McLeod Ave. 46°51′32″N 113°59′28″W | Missoula | |
| 11 | Cook Farm | | May 16, 1996 (#96000546) | 5185 Old Marshall Grade Rd. 46°52′39″N 113°55′49″W | Missoula | Property converted to Canyon River Golf Community, upscale housing development. |
| 12 | DeSmet Schoolhouse | DeSmet Schoolhouse | February 28, 1991 (#91000151) | 6105 Old Highway 10, W. 46°55′46″N 114°05′51″W | Missoula | |
| 13 | Dixon-Duncan Block | Dixon-Duncan Block | October 17, 1997 (#90000654) | 232-240 N. Higgins Ave. 46°52′18″N 113°59′35″W | Missoula | |
| 14 | Double Arrow Lodge | Double Arrow Lodge | November 24, 2014 (#14000958) | 301 Lodge Way; 47°09′06″N 113°27′28″W | Seeley Lake vicinity | |
| 15 | Double Arrow Lookout | Double Arrow Lookout | January 25, 2018 (#100002041) | Approx. 3 miles (4.8 km) SW of Seeley Lake; 47°09′53″N 113°31′52″W | Seeley Lake vicinity | |
| 16 | East Pine Street Historic District | East Pine Street Historic District | July 13, 1989 (#89000768) | Roughly bounded by E. Pine St., Madison St., E. Broadway, and Pattee St. 46°52′18″N 113°59′18″W | Missoula | |
| 17 | Evaro School | Evaro School | May 1, 2003 (#03000321) | 6688 Grooms Rd. 47°02′02″N 114°05′23″W | Evaro | |
| 18 | Florence Hotel | Florence Hotel | June 18, 1992 (#92000782) | 111 N. Higgins Ave. 46°52′13″N 113°59′40″W | Missoula | |
| 19 | Flynn Ranch | Flynn Ranch | March 19, 1980 (#80002426) | West of Missoula on Mullan Rd. 46°53′30″N 114°03′54″W | Missoula | |
| 20 | Forkenbrock Funeral Home | Forkenbrock Funeral Home | December 27, 1984 (#84000570) | 234 E. Pine St. 46°52′21″N 113°59′26″W | Missoula | Funeral home built in 1929. |
| 21 | Fort Fizzle Site | Fort Fizzle Site | July 21, 1977 (#77000821) | 5 miles (8.0 km) west of Lolo; 46°44′48″N 114°10′19″W | Lolo | |
| 22 | Fort Missoula Historic District | Fort Missoula Historic District | April 29, 1987 (#87000865) | Reserve St. and South Ave. 46°50′34″N 114°03′16″W | Missoula | Boundary increase listed February 28, 2012. |
| 23 | Garden City Drug | Garden City Drug | April 30, 1990 (#90000660) | 118 N. Higgins Ave. 46°52′14″N 113°59′38″W | Missoula | |
| 24 | A.J. Gibson House | A.J. Gibson House | April 16, 1980 (#80002427) | 402 S. 2nd St. 46°51′36″N 114°01′39″W | Missoula | |
| 25 | Gleim Building | Gleim Building | April 30, 1990 (#90000653) | 265 W. Front St. 46°52′20″N 113°59′50″W | Missoula | |
| 26 | Gleim Building II | Gleim Building II | March 9, 1995 (#95000143) | 255-257 W. Front St. 46°52′20″N 113°59′50″W | Missoula | |
| 27 | Grand Pacific Hotel | Grand Pacific Hotel | September 29, 1983 (#83001072) | 118 W. Alder; 46°52′31″N 113°59′29″W | Missoula | |
| 28 | Hammond Arcade | Hammond Arcade | April 30, 1990 (#90000646) | 101 S. Higgins Ave. 46°52′12″N 113°59′42″W | Missoula | |
| 29 | Headquarters Building and Daily Company Annex | Headquarters Building and Daily Company Annex | May 17, 1996 (#96000547) | 113-119 W. Front St. 46°52′13″N 113°59′42″W | Missoula | |
| 30 | Hellgate Lodge 383 BPOE | Hellgate Lodge 383 BPOE | April 30, 1990 (#90000661) | 120 N. Pattee St. 46°52′13″N 113°59′32″W | Missoula | |
| 31 | J.M. Herzog House | J.M. Herzog House | September 12, 1985 (#85002164) | 1210 Toole Ave. 46°52′42″N 114°00′28″W | Missoula | |
| 32 | Higgins Block | Higgins Block | October 1, 1979 (#79003720) | 202 N. Higgins Ave. 46°52′17″N 113°59′36″W | Missoula | |
| 33 | Independent Telephone Company Building | Independent Telephone Company Building | April 30, 1990 (#90000648) | 207 E. Main St. 46°52′14″N 113°59′30″W | Missoula | |
| 34 | John S. Johnston House | John S. Johnston House | August 2, 1984 (#84002502) | 412 W. Alder St. 46°52′36″N 113°59′47″W | Missoula | |
| 35 | John M. Keith House | John M. Keith House | July 7, 1983 (#83001073) | 1110 Gerald Ave. 46°51′39″N 113°59′40″W | Missoula | |
| 36 | Knowles Building | Knowles Building | April 9, 1987 (#87000608) | 200-210 S. 3rd St., W. 46°52′03″N 113°59′54″W | Missoula | |
| 37 | Labor Temple | Labor Temple | April 30, 1990 (#90000650) | 208 E. Main St. 46°52′15″N 113°59′29″W | Missoula | |
| 38 | Laird's Lodge Historic District | | August 17, 1990 (#90001213) | Northern end of Lindbergh Lake at the end of Lindbergh Lake Rd. 47°24′19″N 113°43′04″W | Seeley Lake | |
| 39 | Lenox Flats | Lenox Flats | August 8, 2000 (#00000874) | 300-306 West Broadway; 46°52′24″N 113°59′45″W | Missoula | |
| 40 | Lincoln School | Lincoln School | June 3, 1997 (#97000500) | 1209 Lolo St. 46°53′04″N 113°57′52″W | Missoula | |
| 41 | Lolo Trail | Lolo Trail | October 15, 1966 (#66000309) | Parallel to U.S. Route 12 on the ridges of the Bitterroot Mountains from Lolo Pass to Weippe; 46°38′06″N 114°34′47″W | Bitterroot Mountains | Extends into Clearwater County, Idaho |
| 42 | Lower Rattlesnake Historic District | Lower Rattlesnake Historic District | June 10, 1999 (#99000697) | Roughly bounded by Vine St., Greenough Park, Elm St., and Pierce St. 46°52′18″N 113°58′37″W | Missoula | |
| 43 | Lucy Building | Lucy Building | April 30, 1990 (#90000656) | 330 N. Higgins Ave. 46°52′23″N 113°59′32″W | Missoula | |
| 44 | Maclay Bridge | Maclay Bridge | December 20, 2016 (#16000875) | Milepost .1 on North Ave. 46°51′11″N 114°05′53″W | Missoula vicinity | |
| 45 | Marsh and Powell Funeral Home | Marsh and Powell Funeral Home | April 30, 1990 (#90000655) | 224 W. Spruce St. 46°52′30″N 113°59′39″W | Missoula | |
| 46 | Masonic Lodge | Masonic Lodge | April 30, 1990 (#90000649) | 120-136 E. Broadway Ave. 46°52′19″N 113°59′32″W | Missoula | |
| 47 | McCormick Neighborhood Historic District | McCormick Neighborhood Historic District | May 19, 2004 (#04000460) | Roughly bounded by River Rd., S. 6th, W., S. Orange St., and the Bitterroot Line of the railroad 46°51′58″N 114°00′24″W | Missoula | |
| 48 | Milwaukee Depot | Milwaukee Depot | April 30, 1982 (#82003175) | 250 Station Dr. 46°52′03″N 113°59′51″W | Missoula | |
| 49 | Milwaukee Road Railroad Substation No. 10 | Milwaukee Road Railroad Substation No. 10 | July 8, 2014 (#14000394) | 5190 Primrose Dr. 46°55′39″N 114°10′00″W | Missoula | |
| 50 | Mineral Peak Lookout | Mineral Peak Lookout | January 29, 2018 (#100002042) | Mineral Peak., Lolo NF; 47°00′13″N 113°48′48″W | Missoula vicinity | |
| 51 | Missoula County Courthouse | Missoula County Courthouse | September 1, 1976 (#76001125) | 220 W. Broadway; 46°52′24″N 113°59′42″W | Missoula | |
| 52 | Missoula County Fairgrounds Historic District | Missoula County Fairgrounds Historic District | September 16, 2010 (#10000765) | 1101 South Ave., W. 46°50′55″N 114°00′53″W | Missoula | |
| 53 | Missoula Downtown Historic District | Missoula Downtown Historic District | August 21, 2009 (#07000647) | Roughly bounded by the former Northern Pacific railroad tracks, the Clark Fork River, Little McCormick Park, and Madison St. Boundary increase/decrease (listed February 7, 2011): Higgins Ave. & Front St. Boundary increase (listed April 8, 2011): Bounded by Montana Rail Link and BNSF Railway, Toole-Railroad-Alder Sts. 46°52′12″N 113°59′13″W | Missoula | Missoula MPS |
| 54 | Missoula Laundry Company | Missoula Laundry Company | April 30, 1990 (#90000651) | 111 E. Spruce St. 46°52′26″N 113°59′29″W | Missoula | |
| 55 | Missoula Mercantile | Missoula Mercantile | April 30, 1990 (#90000647) | 114 N. Higgins Ave. 46°52′13″N 113°59′38″W | Missoula | Demolished in 2017. |
| 56 | Missoula Mercantile Warehouse | Missoula Mercantile Warehouse | April 6, 2004 (#04000266) | 221, 229, and 231 E. Front St. 46°52′10″N 113°59′32″W | Missoula | |
| 57 | Missoula Southside Historic District | Missoula Southside Historic District | March 22, 1991 (#91000334) | Roughly bounded by the Clark Fork River, S. Higgins Ave., S. 6th St., W., and Orange St. 46°51′57″N 113°59′58″W | Missoula | |
| 58 | Model Laundry and Apartments | Model Laundry and Apartments | April 30, 1990 (#90000657) | 131 W. Alder St. 46°52′47″N 113°59′34″W | Missoula | |
| 59 | Montgomery Ward | Montgomery Ward | April 30, 1990 (#90000659) | 201 N. Higgins Ave. 46°52′17″N 113°59′38″W | Missoula | |
| 60 | Moon-Randolph Ranch | Moon-Randolph Ranch | March 1, 2010 (#10000042) | 1515 Spurlock Rd. 46°54′01″N 114°00′10″W | Missoula | |
| 61 | Mrs. Lydia McCaffery's Furnished Rooms | Mrs. Lydia McCaffery's Furnished Rooms | April 6, 2000 (#00000335) | 501 W. Alder; 46°52′35″N 113°59′50″W | Missoula | |
| 62 | Northern Pacific Railroad Depot | Northern Pacific Railroad Depot | March 28, 1985 (#85000644) | Railroad and Higgins Ave. 46°52′31″N 113°59′30″W | Missoula | |
| 63 | Northside Missoula Railroad Historic District | Northside Missoula Railroad Historic District | May 4, 1995 (#95000532) | Roughly bounded by Worden Ave., 6th St., Interstate 90, C St. and the former Northern Pacific railroad tracks 46°52′44″N 113°59′35″W | Missoula | |
| 64 | Orange Street Underpass | Orange Street Underpass | March 26, 2012 (#12000172) | Orange St. between N. 2nd St. W. & W. Alder St. 46°52′39″N 113°59′43″W | Missoula | part of the Montana's Steel Stringer and Steel Girder Bridges Multiple Property Submission |
| 65 | Palace Hotel | Palace Hotel | October 25, 1982 (#82000594) | 147 W. Broadway; 46°52′20″N 113°59′40″W | Missoula | |
| 66 | Edgar Paxson House | Edgar Paxson House | November 6, 1986 (#86002935) | 611 Stephens Ave. 46°51′38″N 114°00′24″W | Missoula | |
| 67 | Potomac School | Potomac School | March 30, 1992 (#92000244) | 220 Potomac Rd. 46°52′54″N 113°34′43″W | Potomac | |
| 68 | Clarence R. Prescott House | Clarence R. Prescott House | September 26, 1985 (#85002515) | University of Montana campus 46°51′42″N 113°58′49″W | Missoula | |
| 69 | Reid House | Reid House | December 18, 2003 (#03001297) | 526 E. Front; 46°52′09″N 113°59′13″W | Missoula | |
| 70 | Guy Ressler Homestead House | | November 28, 2012 (#12000980) | Near Burnt Fork Cr. 47°13′09″N 114°37′34″W | Huson vicinity | |
| 71 | St. Francis Xavier Church | St. Francis Xavier Church | April 28, 1982 (#82003176) | 420 W. Pine St. 46°52′29″N 113°59′48″W | Missoula | |
| 72 | Saint John the Baptist Catholic Church | Saint John the Baptist Catholic Church | March 27, 1986 (#86000585) | Mullan Rd. 47°00′47″N 114°13′40″W | Frenchtown | |
| 73 | Simons Block | Simons Block | February 18, 2000 (#00000047) | 314 N. Higgins Ave. 46°52′23″N 113°59′32″W | Missoula | |
| 74 | Stark House | Stark House | July 28, 2020 (#100005393) | Address restricted | Condon vicinity | |
| 75 | Stark School | | October 12, 1995 (#95001165) | Ninemile Rd. in Ninemile Valley; 47°07′07″N 114°29′28″W | Huson | |
| 76 | Fred T. Sterling House | Fred T. Sterling House | July 7, 1983 (#83001074) | 1310 Gerald Ave. 46°51′31″N 113°59′43″W | Missoula | |
| 77 | Studebaker Building | Studebaker Building | April 17, 1997 (#97000355) | 216 W. Main St. 46°52′20″N 113°59′45″W | Missoula | |
| 78 | Target Range Elementary School | Target Range Elementary School | August 10, 2011 (#11000526) | 4095 South Ave. W 46°50′53″N 114°04′49″W | Missoula | |
| 79 | John R. Toole House | John R. Toole House | April 25, 1983 (#83004308) | 1005 Gerald Ave. 46°51′43″N 113°59′43″W | Missoula | |
| 80 | Traveler's Rest | Traveler's Rest | October 15, 1966 (#66000437) | 1 mile (1.6 km) south of Lolo near U.S. Route 93; 46°44′24″N 114°04′06″W | Lolo | |
| 81 | U.S. Forest Service Remount Depot | U.S. Forest Service Remount Depot | April 10, 1980 (#80002425) | 2.4 miles (3.9 km) southwest of Huson; 47°04′04″N 114°23′56″W | Huson | |
| 82 | U.S. Post Office | U.S. Post Office | November 30, 1979 (#79001406) | 200 E. Broadway St. 46°52′20″N 113°59′26″W | Missoula | |
| 83 | University Apartments | University Apartments | March 28, 1985 (#85000645) | 400-422 Roosevelt Ave. 46°51′45″N 113°59′48″W | Missoula | |
| 84 | University Area Historic District | University Area Historic District | December 13, 2000 (#00001523) | Roughly bounded by S. 4th St., E., Beckwith Ave., Arthur Ave., and Higgins Ave. 46°51′40″N 113°59′33″W | Missoula | |
| 85 | University of Montana Historic District | University of Montana Historic District | October 2, 1992 (#92001284) | Roughly bounded by Arthur, Connell, and Beckwith Aves., and the ridge lines of Mt. Sentinel; Boundary increase (listed December 1, 2011): 32 Campus Dr. 46°51′25″N 113°58′35″W | Missoula | |
| 86 | West Fork Butte Lookout | West Fork Butte Lookout | January 25, 2018 (#100002043) | West Fork Butte, Lolo NF; 46°44′09″N 114°24′57″W | Missoula vicinity | |
| 87 | Wilma Theatre | Wilma Theatre | December 31, 1979 (#79001407) | 104 S. Higgins Ave. 46°52′08″N 113°59′43″W | Missoula | |
| 88 | Zip Auto | Zip Auto | April 30, 1990 (#90000658) | 251 W. Main St. 46°52′19″N 113°59′47″W | Missoula | |

== See also ==
- List of National Historic Landmarks in Montana
- National Register of Historic Places listings in Montana
