= Seeley Lake =

Seeley Lake may refer to:

- Seeley Lake, Montana, a census-designated place in Montana, United States
- Seeley Lake (lake), the eponymous lake partially located in the census-designated place
- Seeley Lake Provincial Park, a lake/park in British Columbia, Canada
