= A. J. Gibson =

American architect

Albert John Gibson
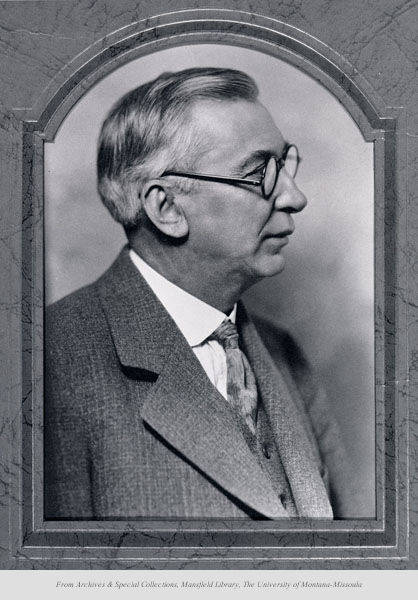
- A. J. Gibson
- Born: April 1, 1862; Ashland County, Ohio, U.S.
- Died: December 31, 1927 (aged 65); Missoula, Montana, U.S.
- Occupation: Architect
- Spouse: Maud Lockley (m. 01/30/1889-12/31/1927; the couple's death at same time)
- Buildings: First five buildings of the University of Montana, the Missoula County Courthouse, several schools, the Carnegie Public Library, the First Presbyterian Church, and multiple others within Missoula, Hamilton, and Stevensville, Montana

Albert John Gibson (April 1, 1862 – December 31, 1927) was one of the most prominent and well-known architects in Missoula, Montana who designed a number of buildings that are listed on the National Register of Historic Places.

== History ==
Gibson was born on a farm near Savannah, Ashland County, Ohio in 1862 and arrived in Butte, Montana. After learning the craft of architecture and carpentry, Gibson moved to Missoula, Montana, around 1889. He married Maud Lockley on January 30, 1889. Maud was the daughter of a well-known newspaperman, Fredrick Lockley. A.J. Gibson had a short career as a carpenter before designing many landmark buildings in the Missoula and Bitterroot area. Gibson retired in 1909, but as a devout Presbyterian and friend of Rev. John Maclean (father of well known author, Norman Maclean), he drew up the architectural plans for the First Presbyterian Church, which opened in 1915. He and his wife were killed instantly on December 31, 1927, when their automobile was struck by a train in Missoula.

== Notable works ==
- Atlantic Hotel, 519 N. Higgins Ave., Missoula, Montana, NRHP-listed
- Bass Mansion (1908–09), 216 N. College St., Stevensville, Montana (with supervising architect John Brechbill)) NRHP-listed
- Carnegie Public Library, 335 N. Pattee St., Missoula, Montana, NRHP-listed
- A. J. Gibson House, 402 S. 2nd St., Missoula, Montana, NRHP-listed
- Hamilton Town Hall, 175 S. 3rd St., Hamilton, Montana, NRHP-listed
- Knowles Building, 200—210 S. Third St. W, Missoula, Montana, NRHP-listed
- Lucy Building, 330 N. Higgins Ave., Missoula, Montana, NRHP-listed
- George May House, 100 Park Ave., Stevensville, Montana, NRHP-listed
- Missoula County Courthouse, 220 W. Broadway, Missoula, Montana, NRHP-listed
- Ravalli County Courthouse, 225 Bedford St., Hamilton, Montana, NRHP-listed
- Riverside, Eastside Hwy., Hamilton, Montana, NRHP-listed
- Fred T. Sterling House, 1310 Gerald Ave., Missoula, Montana, NRHP-listed
- University Apartments, 400-422 Roosevelt Ave., Missoula, Montana, NRHP-listed
- One or more works in East Pine Street Historic District, Roughly bounded by E. Pine St., Madison St., E. Broadway, and Pattee St., Missoula, Montana, NRHP-listed
- One or more works in Hamilton Commercial Historic District, Main, N. Second, S. Second, S. Third, and State Sts., Hamilton, Montana, NRHP-listed
- One or more works in Missoula Southside Historic District, roughly bounded by the Clark Fork R., S. Higgins Ave., S. 6th St. W. and Orange St., Missoula, Montana, NRHP-listed
- One or more works in University of Montana Historic District, roughly bounded by Arthur, Connell and Beckwith Aves. and the ridge lines of Mt. Sentinel, Missoula, Montana, NRHP-listed
- Somers Mansion in Somers, Montana, a 14 bedroom, 3 bathroom Mansion built for Lumber Company owner John O'Brien.
- Main Hall (University Hall), University of Montana
- Daly Mansion remodel, 251 Eastside Hwy, Hamilton, MT 59840
