= Double Arrow =

Double Arrow or Double arrow may refer to:

- a subset of arrows in Unicode
- the British Rail Double Arrow logo, now officially known as the National Rail Double Arrow
- the Double Arrow Lodge, near Seeley Lake in the US state of Montana
