= H. E. Kirkemo =

American architect

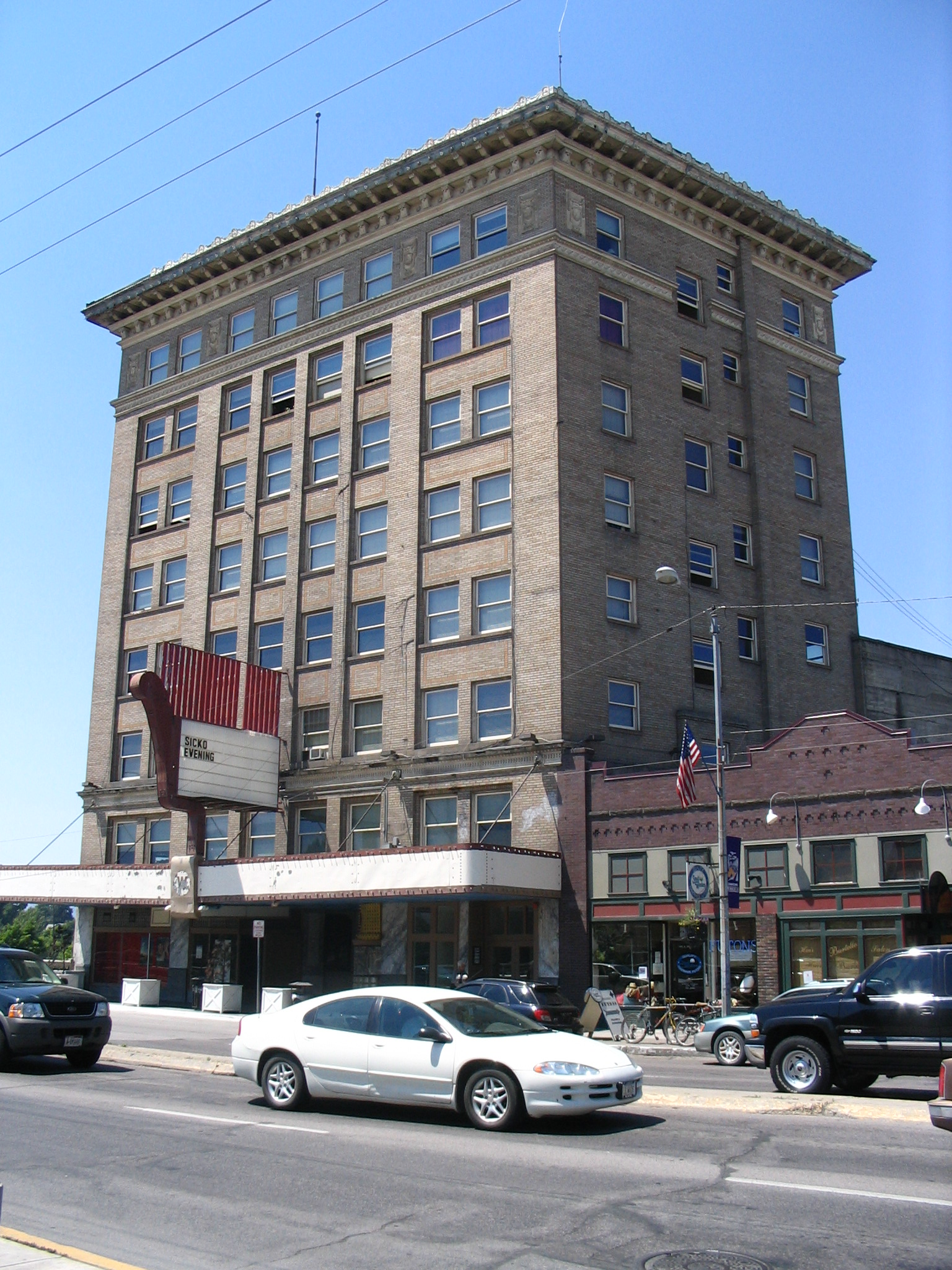
Wilma Theatre

Henry Elmer "Kirk" Kirkemo (July 26, 1894 - March 22, 1987) was an American architect principally known for his work in western Montana and, in particular, in Missoula, Montana. His son, James W. Kirkemo, later took over his architecture practice. His papers are maintained at the University of Montana - Missoula. At the time of the 1930 and 1940 United States Censuses, Kirkemo was living in Missoula with his wife Lillian and son James Wallace Kirkemo.

He worked together with A.J. Gibson (1862-1928) and with Ole Bakke (1889-1925).

A number of his works are listed on the U.S. National Register of Historic Places.

Works include:

- Marcus Daly Memorial Hospital, 211 S. 4th St. Hamilton, MT (Kirkemo, H.E.), NRHP-listed
- Missoula Laundry Company, 111 E. Spruce St. Missoula, MT (Kirkemo, H.E.), NRHP-listed
- Wilma Theatre, 104 S. Higgins Ave. Missoula, MT (Kirkemo, H.E.), NRHP-listed
- Zip Auto, 251 W. Main St. Missoula, MT (Kirkemo, H.E.), NRHP-listed
- One or more works in Hamilton Commercial Historic District, Main, N. Second, S. Second, S. Third, and State Sts. Hamilton, MT (Kirkemo, H.E.), NRHP-listed
