= Bass Mansion (Stevensville, Montana) =

Historic house in Montana, United States

- U.S. National Register of Historic Places
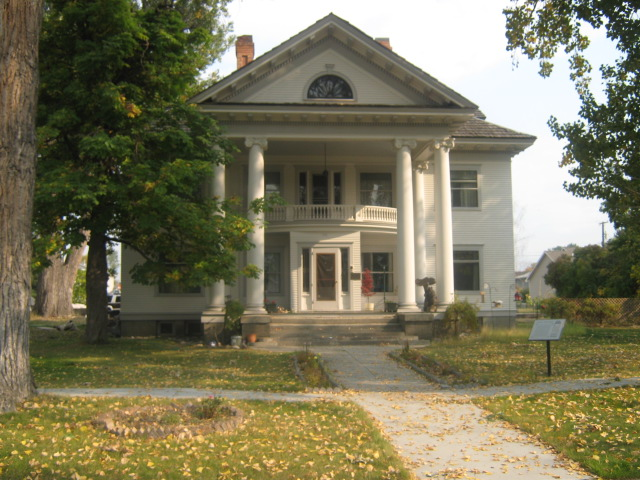

- Location within Montana Location within the United States
- Location: 216 N. College St., Stevensville, Montana
- Coordinates: 46°30′43″N 114°5′20″W
- Area: 0.2 acres (0.081 ha)
- Built: 1908-09
- Architect: Gibson, A.J.; Brechbill, John
- NRHP reference No.: 78001691
- Added to NRHP: November 14, 1978

The Bass Mansion, located at 216 N. College St. in Stevensville, Montana, was built during 1908–09. It was listed on the National Register of Historic Places in 1978.

It was designed by Missoula, Montana architect A.J. Gibson and its construction was supervised by architect John Brechbill for owner Dudley C. Bass. Dudley C. Bass and his brother William Bass, are credited with pioneering the state's fruit industry by their "renowned" 1,000 acres (4.0 km^{2}) Pine Grove (Fruit) Farm, "renowned" in the east as well as the northwest.

It is a two-story frame building with a monumental pedimented portico having six "quasi-Ionic" columns. Two of the columns are engaged and four support the front of the pediment.
