= Lake ball =

Natural formation of water surface debris

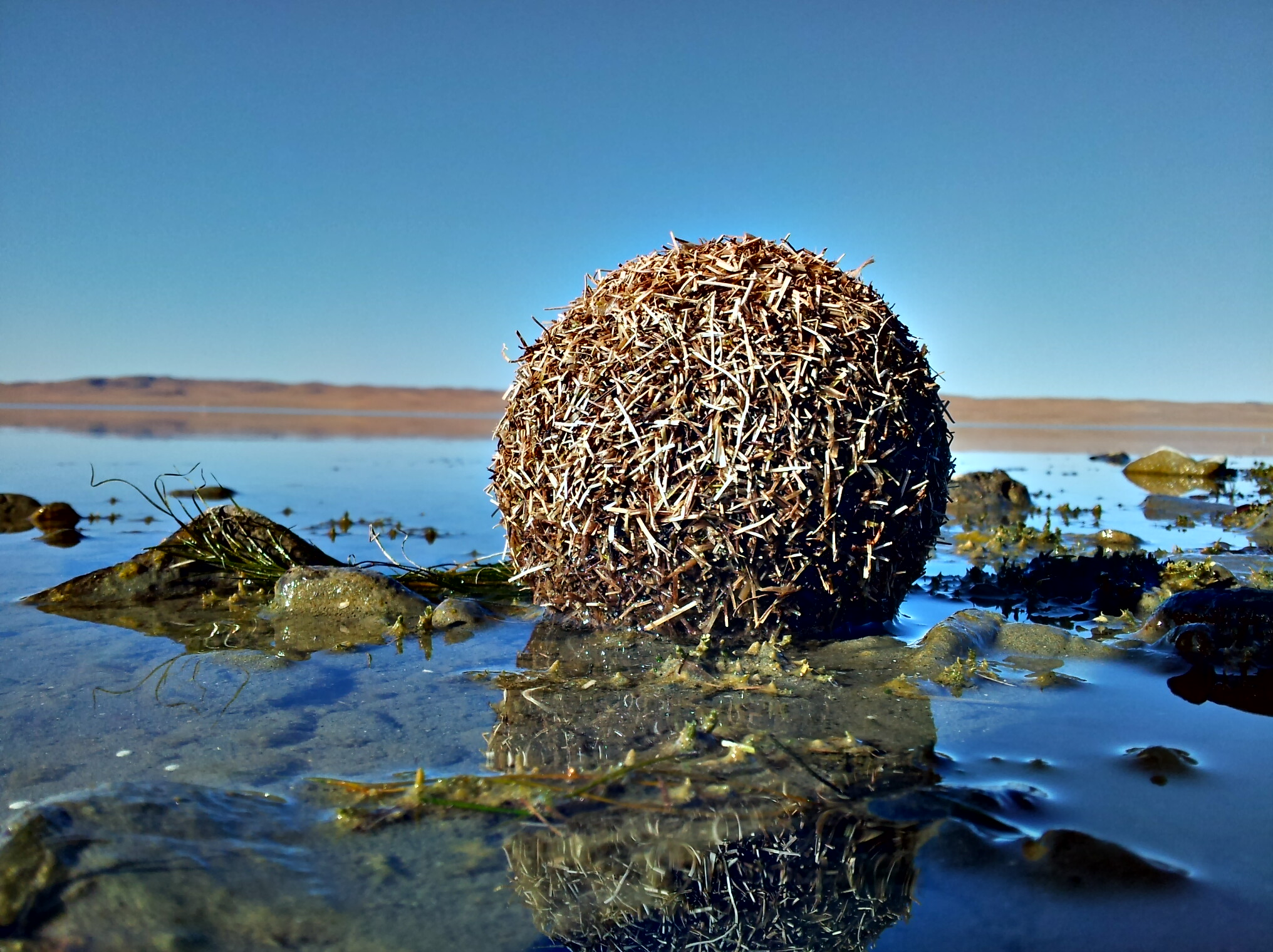
Lake ball on the southern shore of Ögii Lake, Arhangay, Mongolia

A lake ball (also known as a surf ball, beach ball or spill ball) is a ball of debris found on ocean beaches and lakes large enough to have wave action. The rolling motion of the waves gathers debris in the water and eventually will form the materials into a ball. The materials vary from year to year and from location to location depending on the debris the motion gathers.

The earliest known reference to lake balls is Walden:

There also I have found, in considerable quantities, curious balls, composed apparently of fine grass or roots, of pipewort perhaps, from half an inch to four inches in diameter, and perfectly spherical. These wash back and forth in shallow water on a sandy bottom, and are sometimes cast on the shore. They are either solid grass, or have a little sand in the middle. At first you would say that they were formed by the action of the waves, like a pebble; yet the smallest are made of equally coarse materials, half an inch long, and they are produced only at one season of the year. Moreover, the waves, I suspect, do not so much construct as wear down a material which has already acquired consistency. They preserve their form when dry for an indefinite period.

— Henry David Thoreau, Walden, chapter 9

== Larch balls ==
A specific type of lake ball, a larch ball is a structure created when Western Larch needles floating in a lake become entangled in a spherical shape due to the action of waves. They are most commonly known to form in Seeley Lake, Montana; however, they have also been known to form in similar regions such as Clark Fork and lakes in Tracy, New Brunswick such as Peltoma Lake, Big Kedron Lake, and Little Kedron Lake. Typical specimens are 3 to 4 inches (8 to 10 centimeters) in diameter. More rarely, larger ones are found.

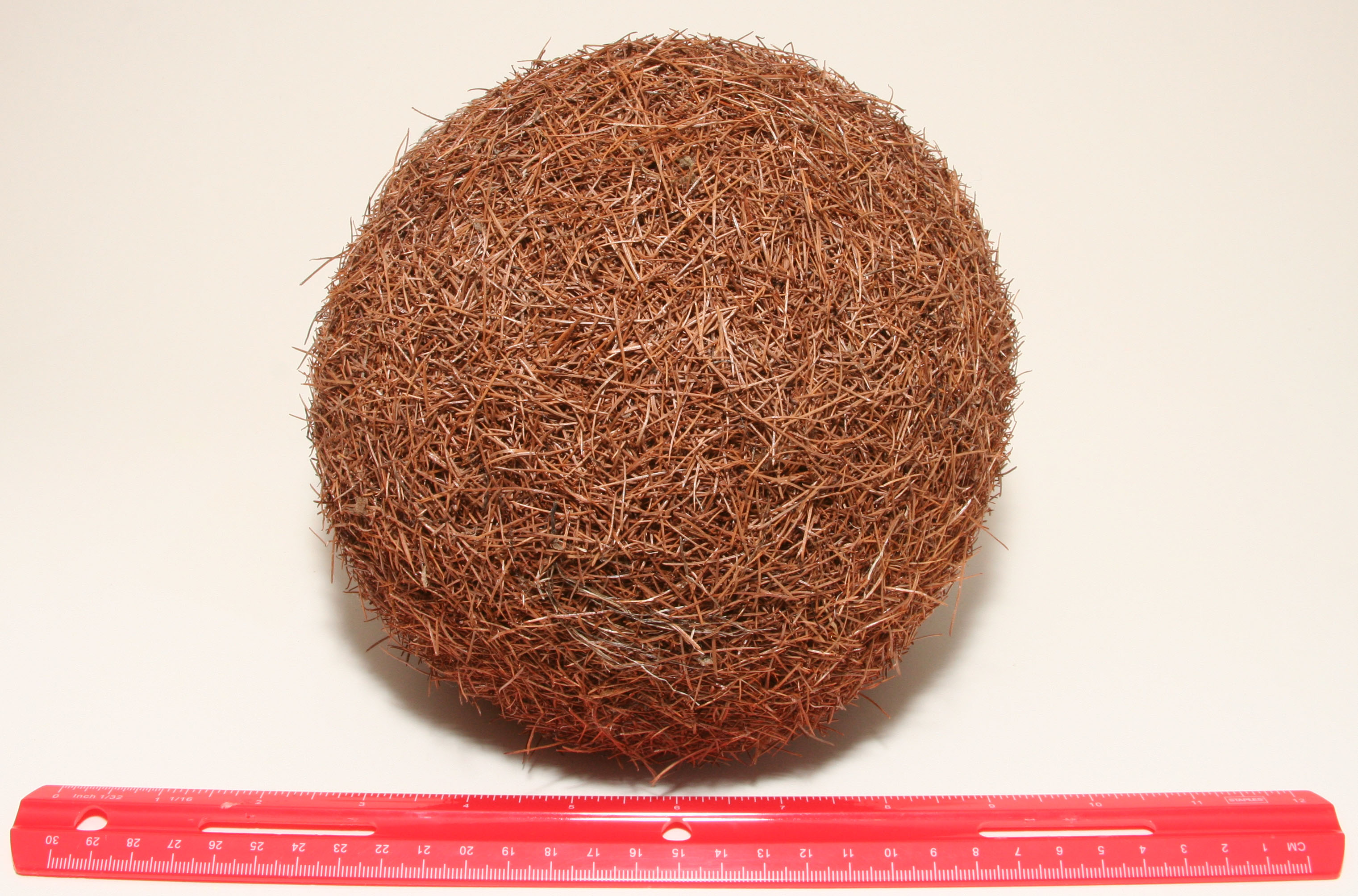
7 inch Larch Ball collected in Seeley Lake, Montana

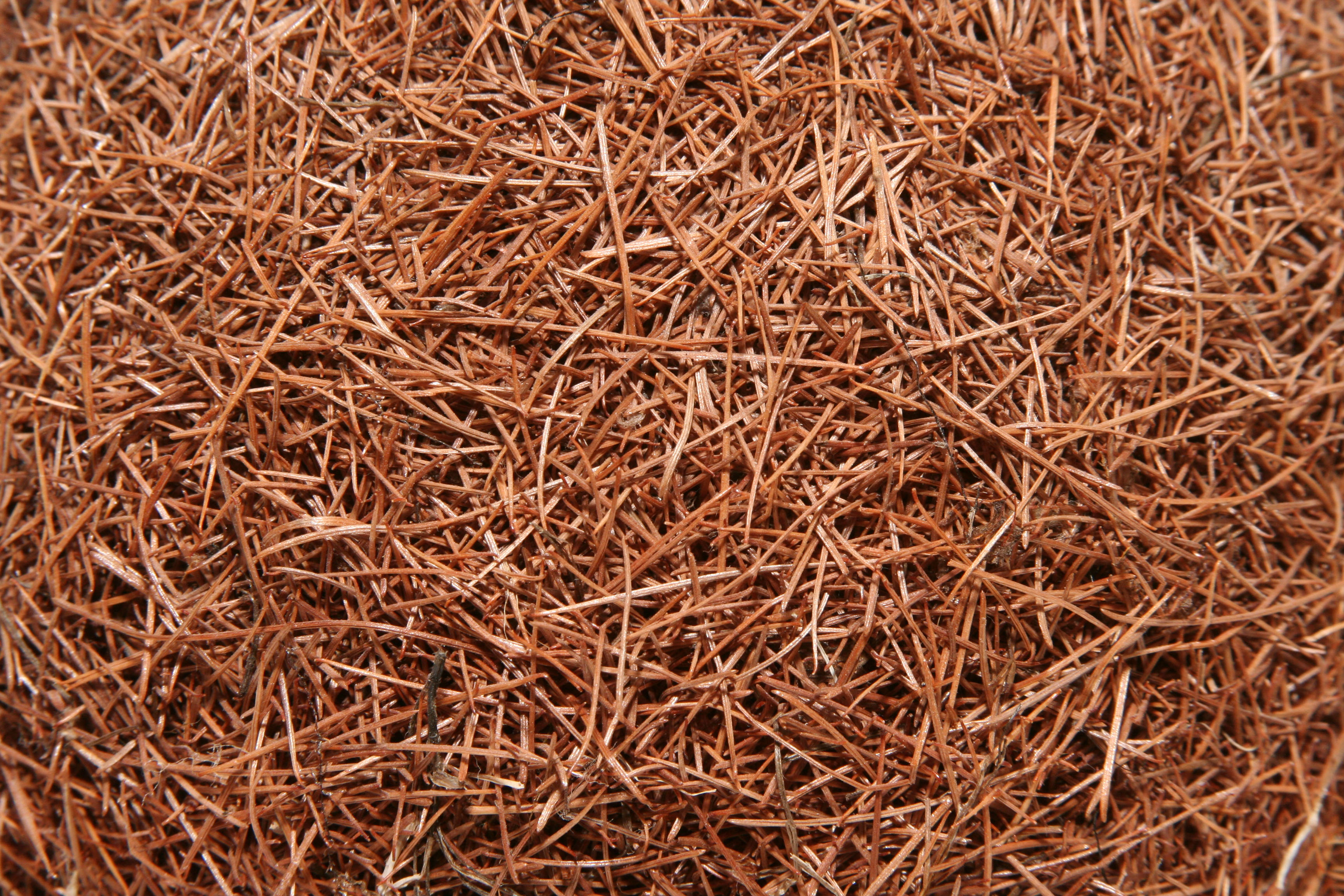
Larch Ball Close Up
