= Double Arrow Lodge =

- U.S. National Register of Historic Places
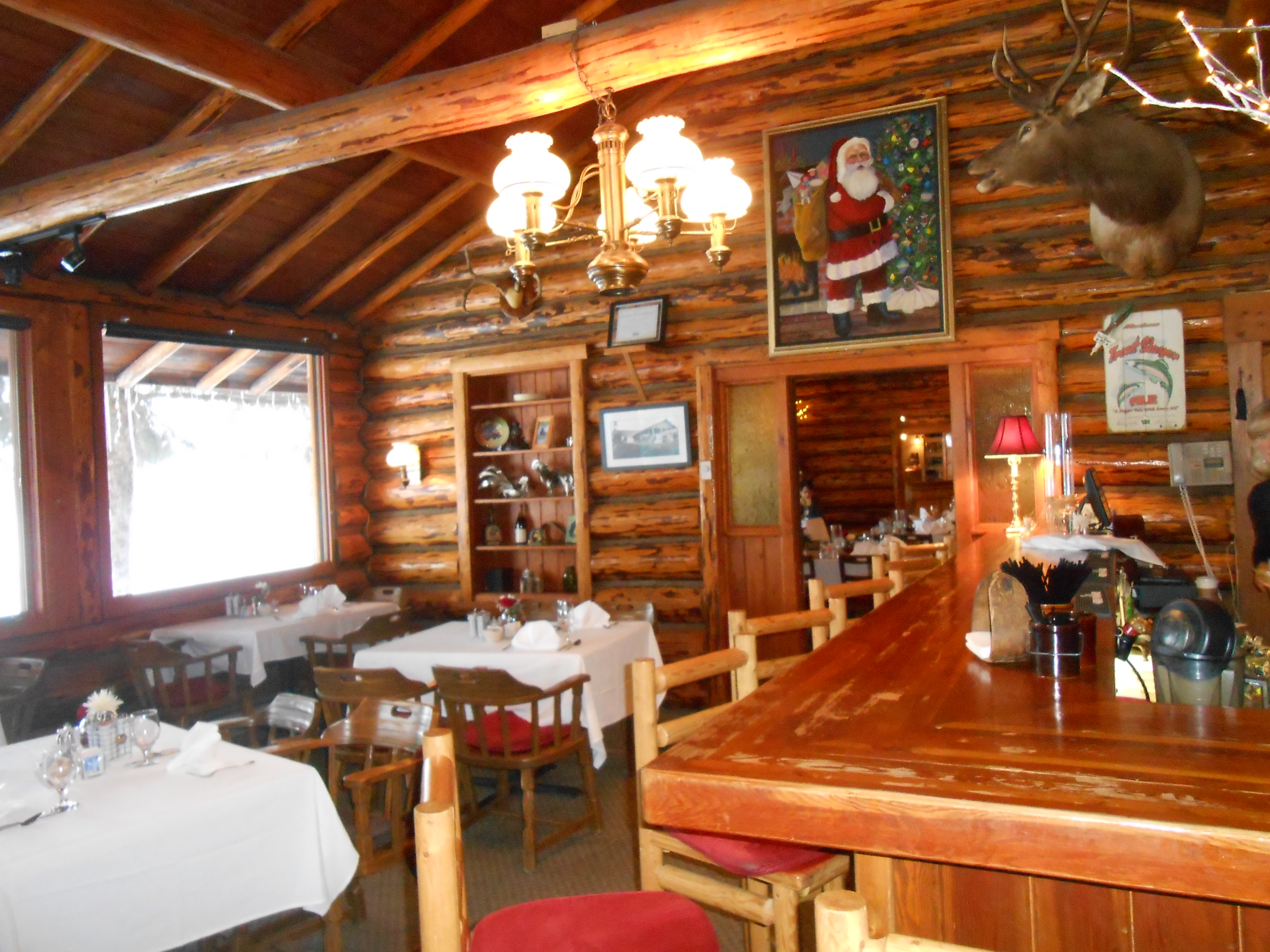
- Bar in 2015

- Location within Montana Location within the United States
- Location: 301 Lodge Way, Seeley Lake vicinity, Missoula County, Montana
- Area: 1 acre (0.40 ha)
- Architectural style: Rustic
- NRHP reference No.: 14000958
- Added to NRHP: November 24, 2014

The Double Arrow Lodge (NRHP designation) a.k.a. Double Arrow Ranch and Double Arrow Resort, is located about a mile south from the community of Seeley Lake, Montana and likewise from Seeley Lake itself. The rustic-style lodge building was built during 1929–1930.

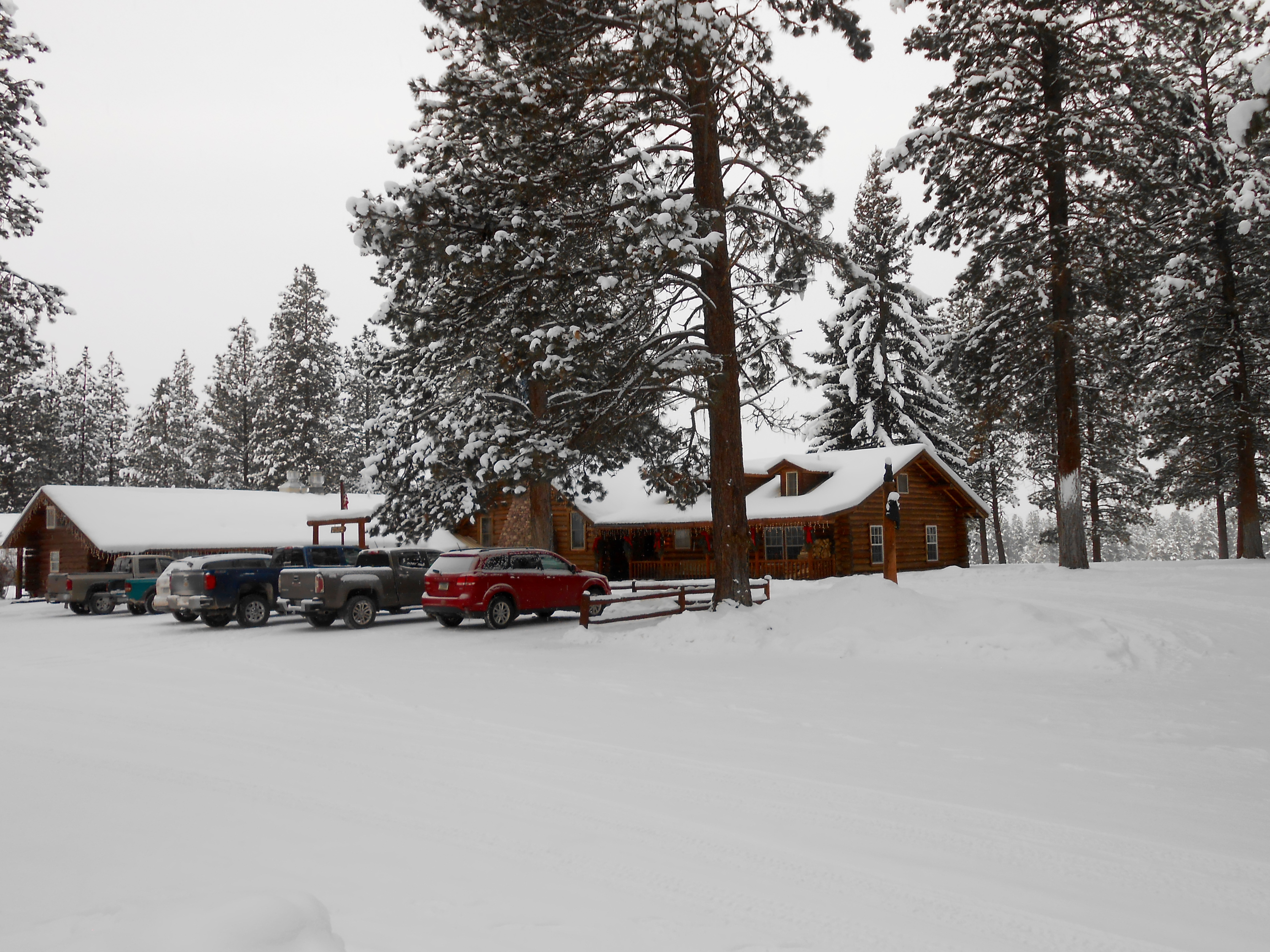
Exterior in 2015

It was a stock ranch known as the Corbett Ranch until it was purchased in the 1920s, then was established as a dude ranch in 1929. Today, the Double Arrow Ranch serves as a luxurious vacation resort, with a range of accommodations, spa facilities, and a 18-hole championship golf course.

== History ==
In the late 1920's, Jan Boissevain, a horseman, and Colonel George F. Weisel purchased a stock farm known as Corbett Ranch in Seeley Lake, Montana. Boissevain would later rename the ranch to Double Arrow Ranch after the distinctive double-arrow brand on his favorite horse. By 1929, Double Arrow Ranch opened as the first commercial dude ranch in Seeley Lake. Boissevain and Weisel spent much of the first year of operation hauling and repurposing local cabins to serve as cottages for guests. In the summer of 1930, the ranch accepted its first paying visitors. Livingston Farrand, President of Cornell University, was among several notable guests who attended the first season inauguration of the Double Arrow Ranch on July 1, 1930.

== Designation to the National Register of Historic Places ==
The Double Arrow Lodge, also known as Double Arrow Ranch, was nominated to the National Register of Historic Places in June 2014; the site was subsequently approved and listed on the National Register on November 24, 2014, receiving NRHP registration number 14000958. The site's listing within the registry is categorized as a place of local significance.

== See also ==
- National Register of Historic Places listings in Missoula County, Montana
