= Riverside (Hamilton, Montana) =

Historic house in Montana, United States

- U.S. National Register of Historic Places
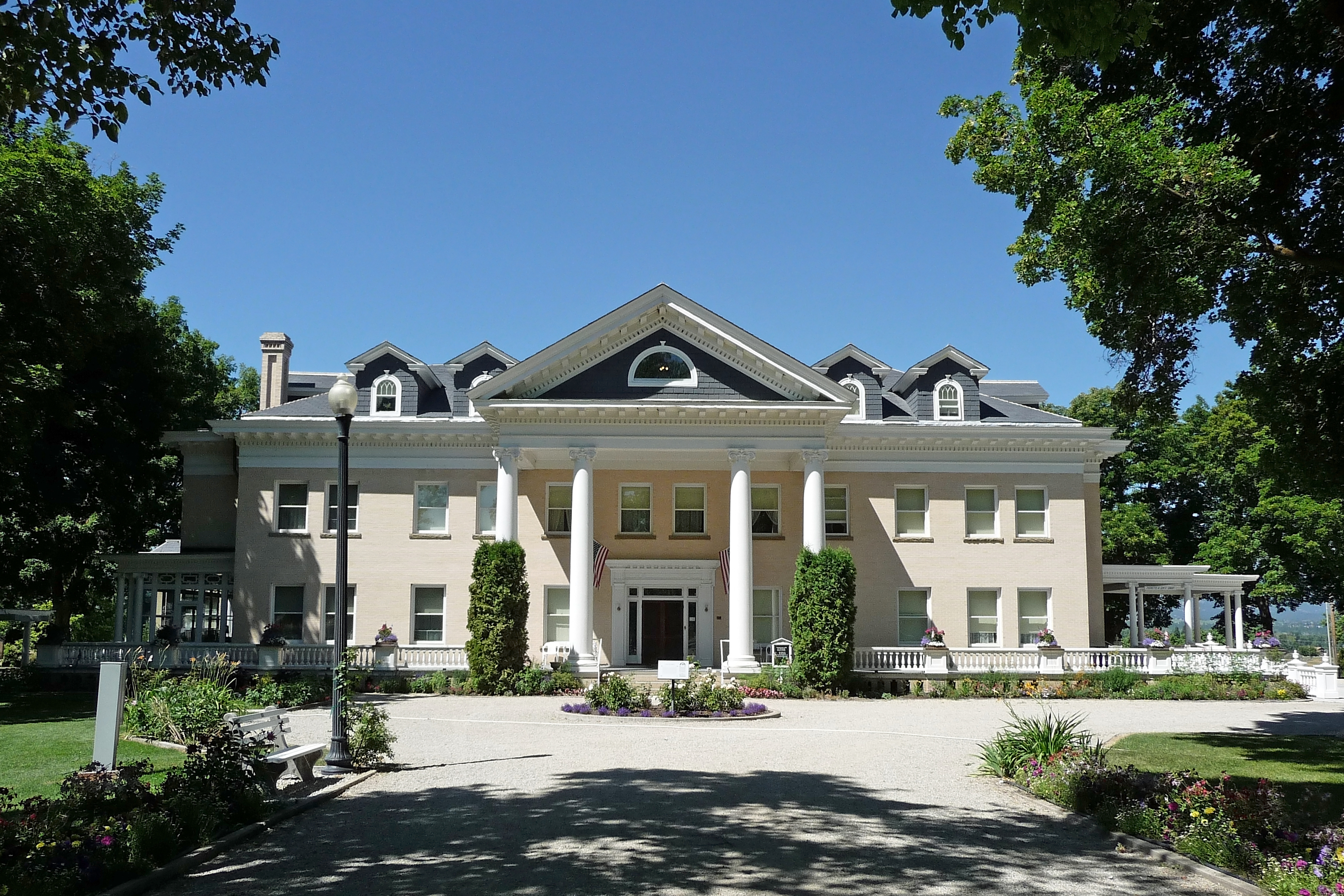

- Location within Montana Location within the United States
- Location: Eastside Highway, Hamilton, Montana
- Area: 46.6 acres (18.9 ha)
- Built: 1880s; 1910
- Architect: A. J. Gibson
- Architectural style: Colonial Revival, Georgian Revival
- Website: http://dalymansion.org/
- NRHP reference No.: 87001235
- Added to NRHP: July 16, 1987

Riverside is a historic house museum in Hamilton, Montana. It was the private residence of Margaret Daly, copper magnate Marcus Daly's widow. It is listed on the National Register of Historic Places. The house is surrounded by 26.5 acres of lawns with over 400 trees.

== History ==
The house was first built for homesteader Anthony Chaffin. After the home and surrounding ranchland was purchased by copper magnate Marcus Daly in 1886, it was redesigned in the Queen Anne architectural style, with a tower. Daly's widow, Margaret, hired architect A. J. Gibson to redesign it in the Colonial Revival and Georgian Revival styles in 1910.

Margaret Daly died in 1941, and the house was ultimately inherited by her granddaughter, Countess Margit Sigray Bessenyey of Hungary, in the 1950s. When she died, it was inherited by her stepson, Francis Bakach-Bessenyey, who deeded it to the state of Montana in 1986 in exchange for forgiveness of $400,000 in inheritance taxes. The Daly Mansion Preservation Trust was established that same year, in part with a donation from him.

In 1986, the Trust began renovations on the mansion, which had been abandoned and closed since 1941. By 1987 a few rooms had been restored and the building opened to the public. A more extensive renovation was started in 2005.

The house has been listed on the National Register of Historic Places since July 16, 1987. It is now a house museum.
