= Gleim Building II =

- U.S. National Register of Historic Places
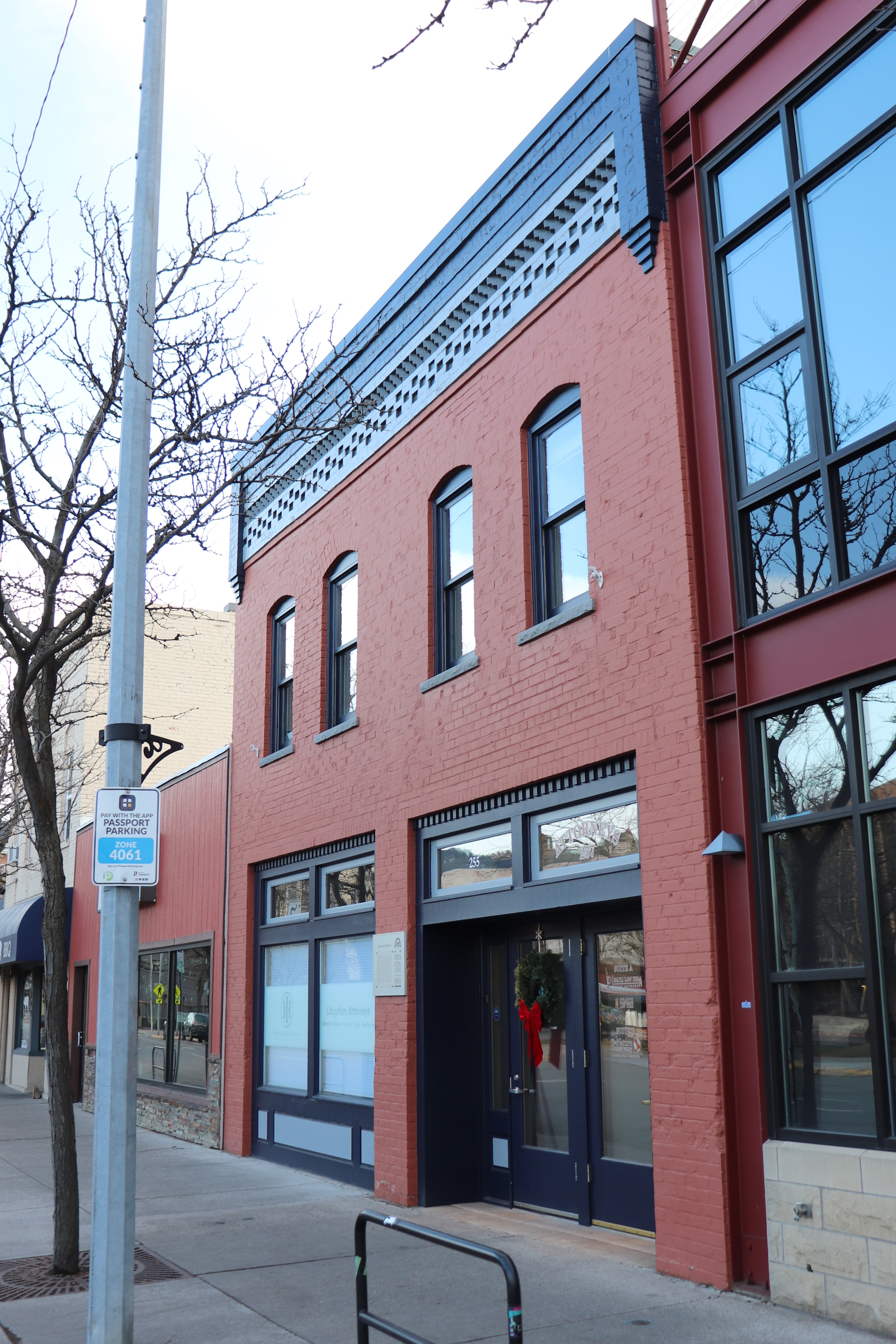
- Gleim II building viewed from Front Street

- Location within Montana Location within the United States
- Location: 255-257 West Front Street, Missoula, Montana
- Coordinates: 46°52′17″N 113°59′52″W
- Built: 1893
- Architectural style: Italianate
- NRHP reference No.: 95000143
- Added to NRHP: March 9, 1995

Constructed in 1893, the Gleim II building at 255-257 West Front Street was built for madame Mary Gleim. While altered over the years, it was restored in the 1990s, and retains Italianate features such as the brick corbelling along the top front. Along with the nearby Gleim Building, Gleim II was built of brick, replacing a prior wooden structure. During the height of Missoula's Redlight District, it was one of eight brothels owned by Mary Gleim.
