= Mary Gleim =

Brothel madame

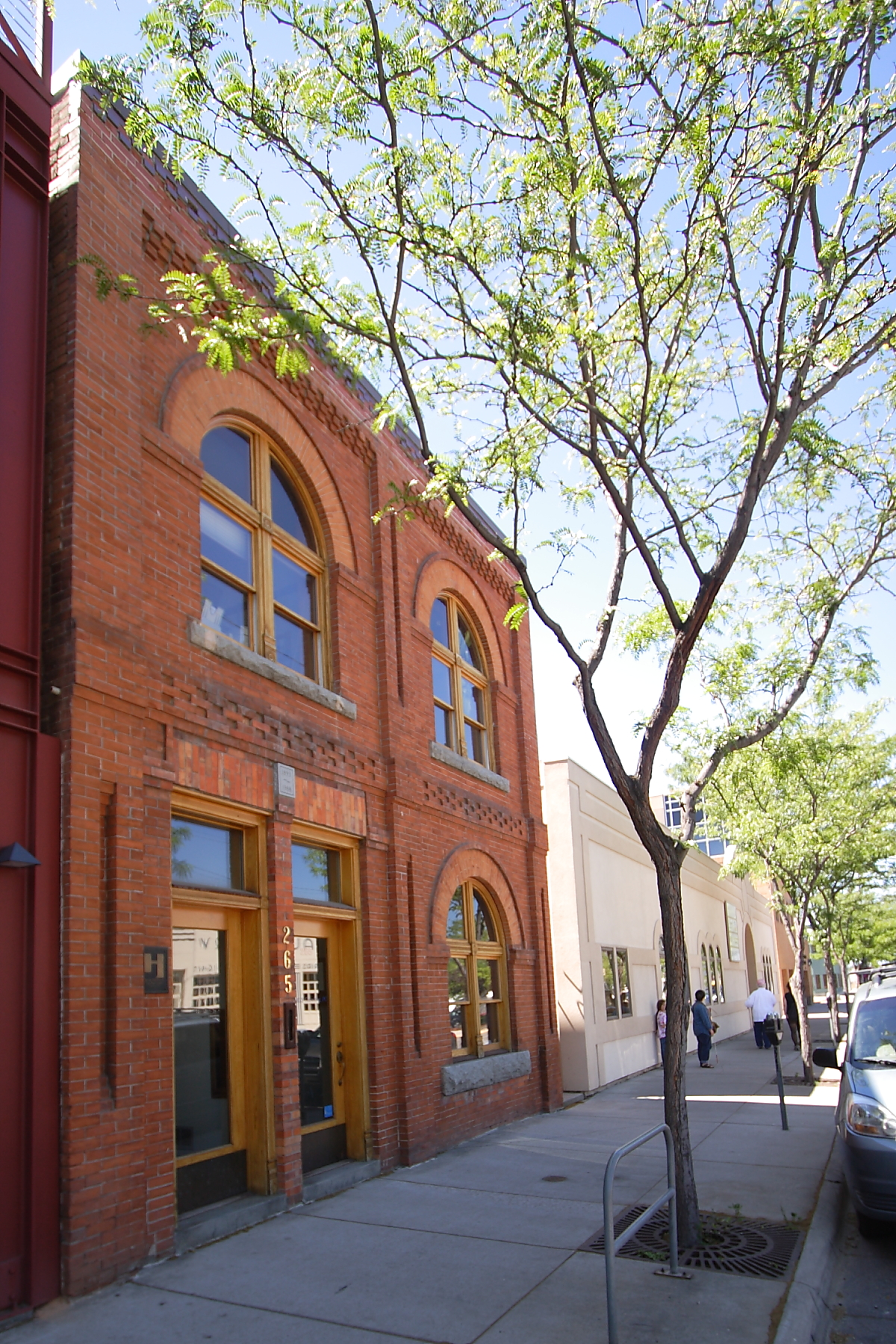
- Mary Gleim's brothel at 265 West Front Street, Missoula
- Born: Minnie Winifred Gleeson; February 9, 1845; County Tipperary, Ireland
- Died: February 22, 1914 (aged 69); Missoula, Montana, US
- Occupation: Brothel madam
- Spouse: John Edgar Gleim

Mary Gleim (née Minnie Winifred Gleeson) (9 February 1845 – 22 February 1914) was the leading and most successful madam in the Old West days of Missoula, Montana, owning eight brothels in 1890.

== Early life ==
Born Minnie Winifred Gleeson on 9 February 1845 in County Tipperary, Ireland, her father, Thomas Gleeson, was reputed to be a landowning squire. Gleim received a good education in England, including in the Romance languages.

In 1869 she met John Edgar Gleim and the couple were married in Sussex, England the following year. John Gleim came from a wealthy St Louis family and enjoyed drinking and gambling. The family's financial affairs were entrusted to Mary so John could carry on his lifestyle without worrying about the financial matters. The couple soon emigrated to America.

The couple lived in San Francisco and New York City, where Gleim was reputedly included in the "Rogues Gallery" of New York's most wanted felons. The couple settled in St Louis where they amassed a sizeable fortune, probably from prostitution.

In 1888 the couple set out for Alaska to take advantage of the gold rush there. They were refused admission at the Canadian border twice, Gleim's reputation proceeding her.

== Missoula, Montana ==
After failing to move to Alaska, Mary Gleim came to Missoula in 1888 with her husband, and quickly saw the potential for prostitution with the large number of railroad workers in the town. She set up brothels one after another in West Front Street and ruled them with a fist of iron, becoming the "Queen of Missoula's Bad Lands". By 1890 she owned eight brothels.

Commonly known as "Mother Gleim", she was one of Missoula's characters and eventually owned a considerable number of properties in Missoula and elsewhere. Weighing 300 lbs, Gleim, in addition to brothel-keeping, was reputed to be a smuggler of diamonds, opium, and Chinese railroad workers. Gleim appeared frequently before the county judge on various charges arising from her drunken rages, including verbal and physical assaults. She also appeared frequently in the civil court for refusal to pay contractors and to evict tenants who could not pay their rent.

In January 1892, Gleim was convicted of assaulting two priests. While drunk, she had attended church to pay respects to the "McCormick Child" who had recently died. She asked a group of priests for a candle to light in Latin. When the priests were unable to reply as they did not understand Latin, she ripped the frocks off Father J. Neale and Brother Pascal Megazzini, claiming they were not fit to wear the holy raiments. Gleim was fined $50, but because she failed to turn up for court, she forfeited her bond and was forced to pay a total of $736.30.

=== Bobby Burns ===
Gleim had a long running feud with rival C.P "Bobby" Burns. Burns once appeared as a witness against her in a dispute over property on Front Street. The pair had had numerous run-ins, and on one occasion Burns was horse whipped and dragged half a block behind a team of horses.

Bobby Burns' house was blown up in the early hours of 12 February 1894. Although the house was levelled, Burns survived the blast. Two men were soon arrested; Patrick Mason and William Reed. Reed was subsequently released and appeared as a witness for the prosecution. Mason was put on trial in August 1894 and the details of the conspiracy to kill Burns came to light. Gleim was accused of masterminding the plot and arrested.

She was held in the county jail while awaiting trial. Gleim had taken a supply of liquor with her into the jail. Officers allowed Gleim out of the jail to collect rents from her properties in the red-light district. While out, she assaulted a rival madam but no charges were brought.

At her trial, future Governor of Montana, Joseph M. Dixon, was the prosecutor and Gleim was defended by Judge Newton W. McConnell and Joseph K. Wood. On 24 September she was found guilty and the following day was sentenced to 14 years imprisonment. While incarcerated in Deer Lodge, Gleim was assaulted by another inmate. She never fully recovered from the stab wounds that were inflicted on her.

Gleim's lawyers launched an appeal in November 1894 but this was turned down by the District Court of Missoula. That decision was appealed to the Montana Supreme Court, who overturned the previous decision. In October 1895 Gleim was released from jail pending a retrial. Two of the witnesses against her had committed suicide and others had moved away from the area. Bobby Burns died of a heart attack in March 1895. With no remaining witnesses, the state dropped the attempted murder charge against Gleim on 23 May 1896.

== Death ==
Gleim died of influenza on West Front Street on 22 February 1914. Although she had lost $135,000 in a failed brick making enterprise, she left an estate of over $148,000. She died without a will and as her husband John had died in October 1896, her niece and nephew inherited her fortune. Her estate included property in Missoula, Ignatius, Ronan and Canada.

Gleim left explicit instructions for her burial in the city cemetery. While other headstones faced east and west, Gleim's faced the railroad so she could say goodbye to the railroad men who were her customers.

== Legacy ==
Gleim had two of her properties rebuilt on Front Street: The "Gleim Building" at number 265 was built in 1893 and the "Gleim Building II" at 255-57 sometime between 1893 and 1902. Both buildings are registered on the U.S. National Register of Historic Places and bear plaques on the wall in tribute to Mary Gleim.

== Bibliography ==
- Foley, Jodie; Axline, Jon (2011). Speaking Ill of the Dead: Jerks in Montana History. Rowman & Littlefield. ISBN 9780762768431.
- MacKell Collins, Jan (2011). Red Light Women of the Rocky Mountains. UNM Press. ISBN 9780826346124.
- MacKell Collins, Jan (2020). Good Time Girls of the Rocky Mountains: A Red-Light History of Montana, Idaho, and Wyoming. Rowman & Littlefield. ISBN 9781493038084.
- Mathews, Allan James (2002). A Guide to Historic Missoula. Montana Historical Society. ISBN 9780917298899.
- Olson, Eric (2015). Courting Justice: More Montana Courthouse Tales. Dog Ear Publishing. ISBN 9781457540240.
- Parrett, Nann (2017). Montana Madams. Farcountry Press. ISBN 9781560376675.
- "Stories and Stones". Missoula City Cemetery. 2017 – via docplayer.net.
