= Forkenbrock Funeral Home =

- U.S. National Register of Historic Places
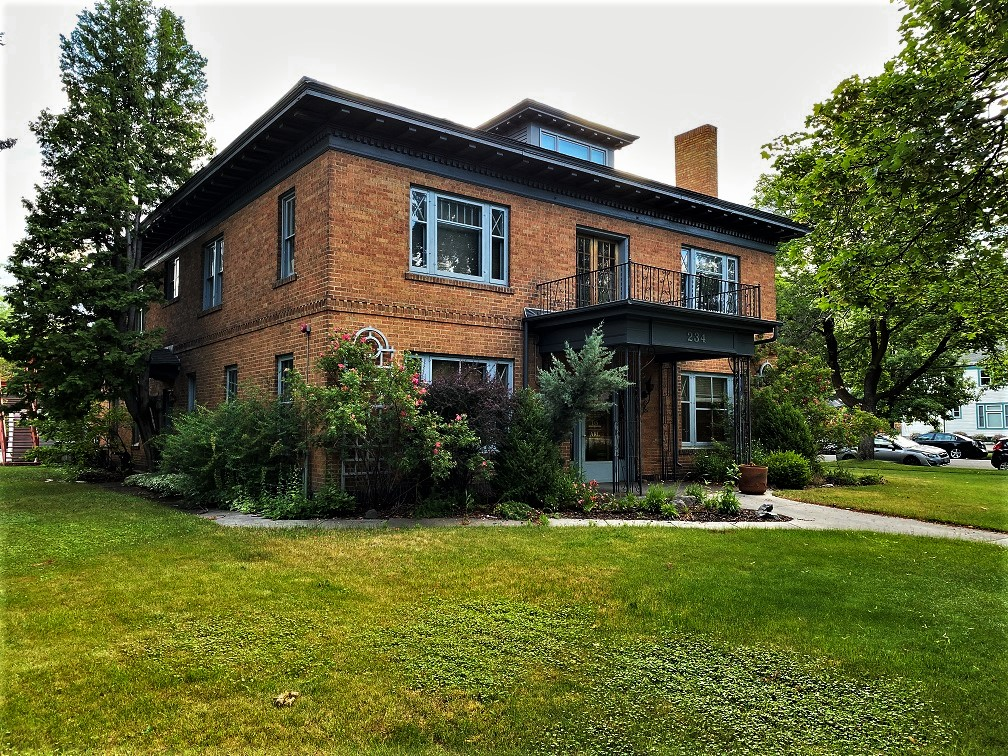

- Location within Montana Location within the United States
- Location: 234 E. Pine St. Missoula, Montana
- Coordinates: 46.872635°N 113.990652°W
- Area: less than one acre
- Built: 1929
- Architectural style: Colonial Revival
- NRHP reference No.: 84000570
- Added to NRHP: December 27, 1984

The Forkenbrock Funeral Home, at 234 E. Pine St. in Missoula, Montana, is a Colonial Revival-style building which was built to serve as a mortuary and funeral home in 1929. It was listed on the National Register of Historic Places in 1984.

It was originally known as the Geraghty Funeral Home.
