= Apartment Building at 116 Spruce Street =

- U.S. National Register of Historic Places
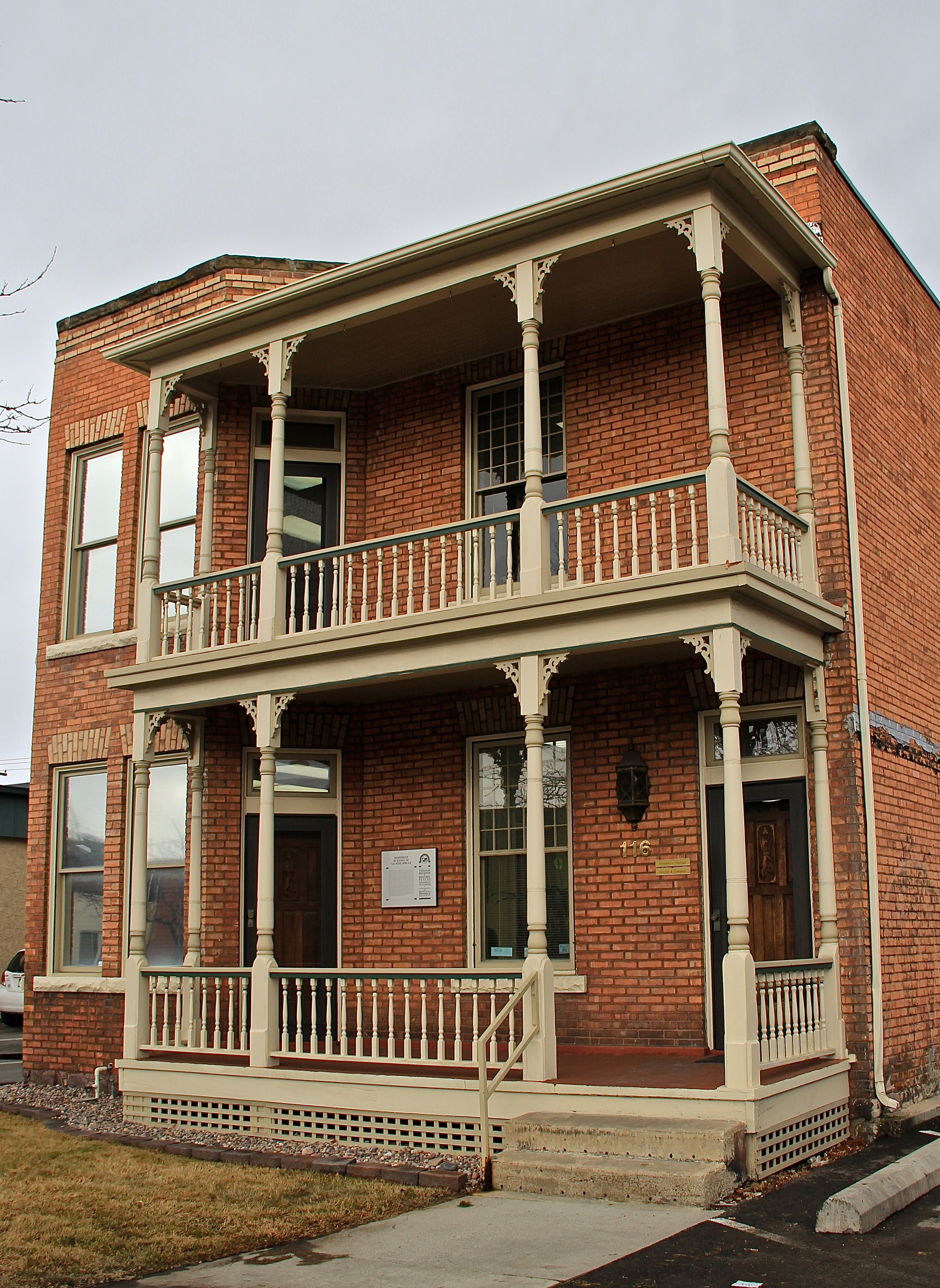

- Location within Montana Location within the United States
- Location: 116 W. Spruce St., Missoula, Montana
- Coordinates: 46°52′28″N 113°59′32″W
- Area: less than one acre
- Built: c. 1902–11
- Architectural style: Queen Anne, Vernacular Queen Anne
- MPS: Missoula MPS
- NRHP reference No.: 90000644
- Added to NRHP: April 30, 1990

The apartment building at 116 Spruce Street in Missoula, Montana was built between 1902 and 1911. It was listed on the National Register of Historic Places in 1990.
