= Hammond Arcade =

Historic place in Montana, United States

- U.S. National Register of Historic Places
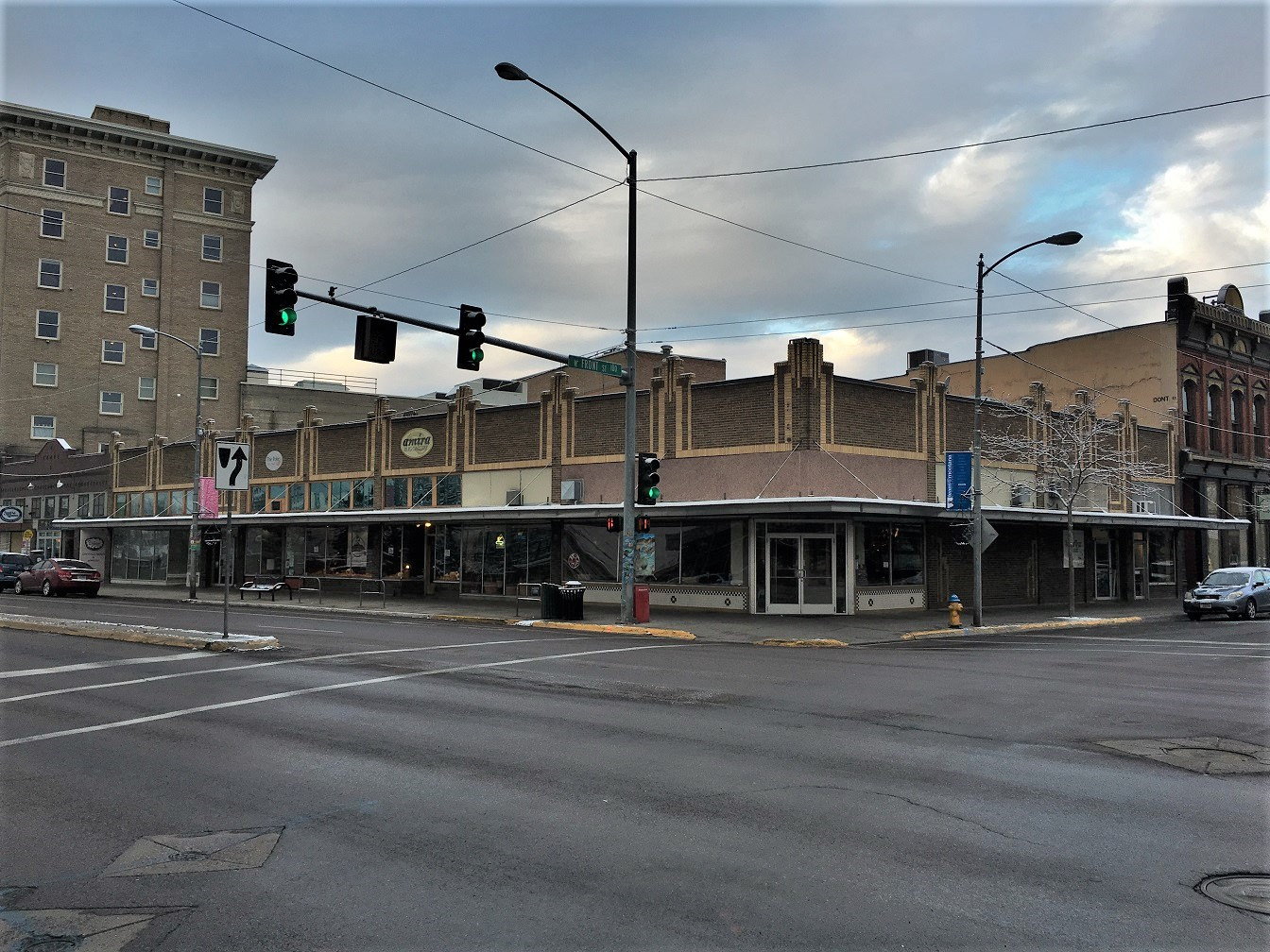

- Location within Montana Location within the United States
- Location: 101 S. Higgins Ave., Missoula, Montana
- Coordinates: 46°52′12″N 113°59′42″W
- Area: less than one acre
- Built: 1934
- Architect: R.C. Hugenin
- Architectural style: Art Deco
- MPS: Missoula MPS
- NRHP reference No.: 90000646
- Added to NRHP: April 30, 1990

The Hammond Arcade, at 101 S. Higgins Ave. in Missoula, Montana, was built in 1934. It was listed on the National Register of Historic Places in 1990.

It includes aspects of Art Deco style. It is a one-story brick commercial building with five front bays and five bays facing north. It is topped by stepped, polychrome brick battlements.
