= Atlantic Hotel (Missoula, Montana) =

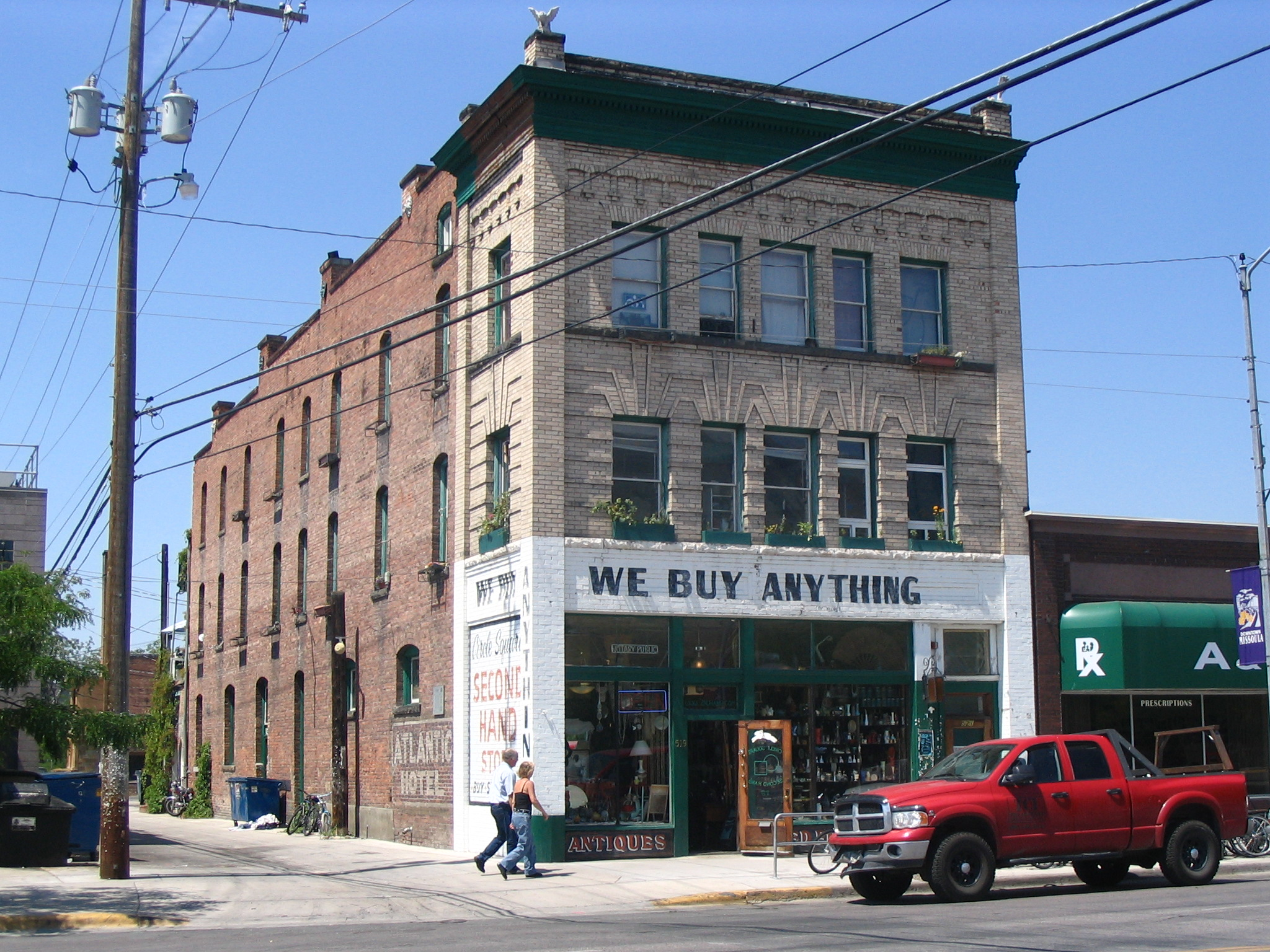
- Interactive map of the Atlantic Hotel area

General information
- Type: Retail, Hotel
- Architectural style: Vernacular Commercial
- Location: 519 N. Higgins Ave., Missoula, Montana
- Coordinates: 46°52′29″N 113°59′34″W
- Completed: 1902

Technical details
- Floor count: 3

Design and construction
- Architect: A.J. Gibson
- Atlantic Hotel
- U.S. National Register of Historic Places
- Location within Montana Location within the United States
- Area: less than one acre
- MPS: Missoula MPS
- NRHP reference No.: 90000652
- Added to NRHP: April 30, 1990

The Atlantic Hotel in Downtown Missoula, was listed on the National Register of Historic Places in 1990. The building has also been known as the Circle Square Second Hand Store, the business which it housed in 1990.

It is a three-story brick building built in 1902. It has a stepped parapet with battlements.

== See also ==
- National Register of Historic Places listings in Missoula County, Montana
