= Zip Auto =

- U.S. National Register of Historic Places
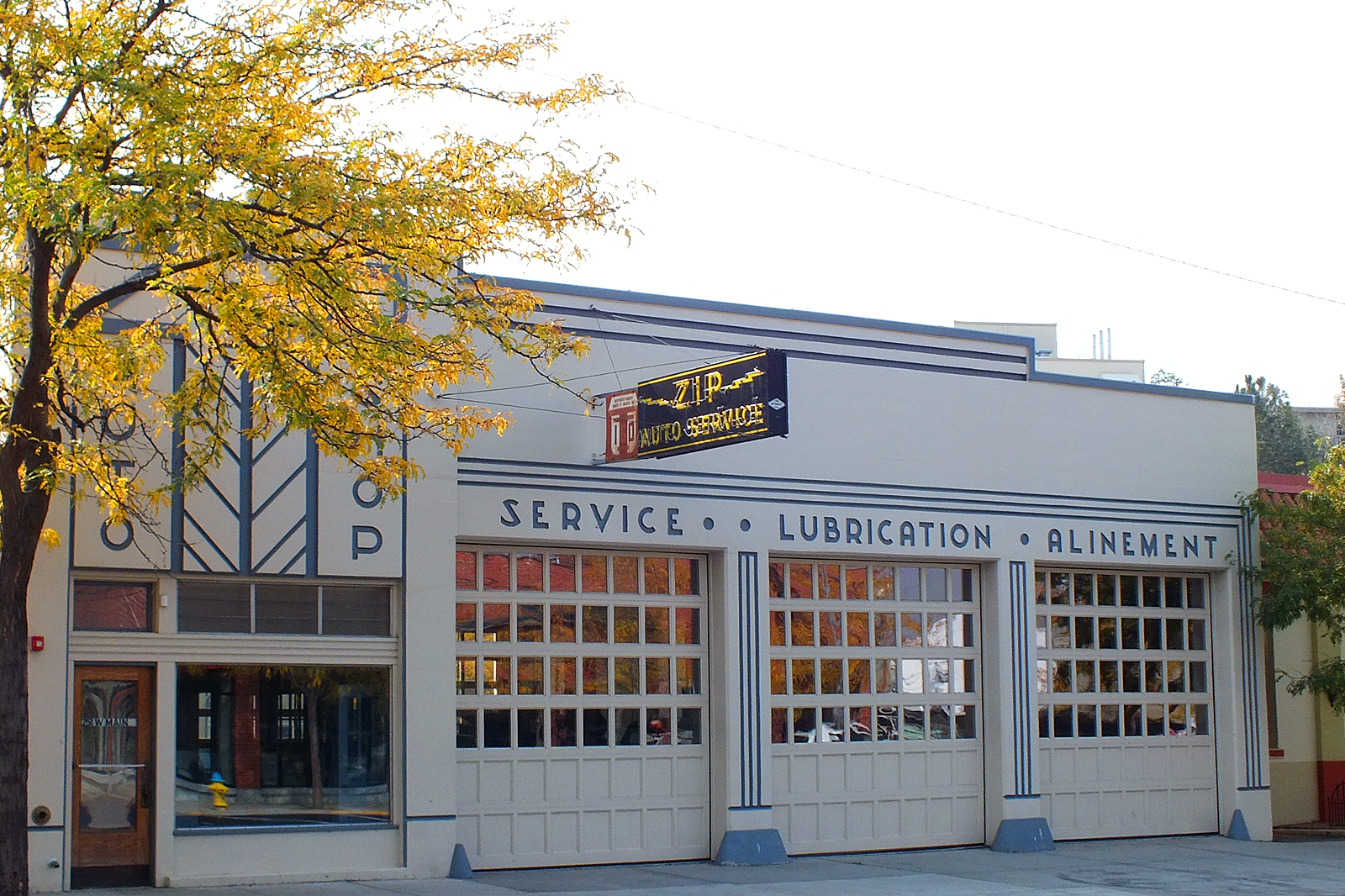

- Location within Montana Location within the United States
- Location: 251 W. Main St., Missoula, Montana
- Coordinates: 46°52′19″N 113°59′47″W
- Area: less than one acre
- Built: 1937
- Architect: H. E. Kirkemo
- Architectural style: Art Moderne
- MPS: Missoula MPS
- NRHP reference No.: 90000658
- Added to NRHP: April 30, 1990

Zip Auto, at 251 W. Main St. in Missoula, Montana, was built in 1937 and was listed on the National Register of Historic Places in 1990.

It was designed by Missoula architect H. E. Kirkemo. It is an Art Moderne-style L-shaped one-story flat-roofed poured concrete structure with four garage bays.
