= Bellows Residence =

Historic house in Montana, United States

- Bellows House
- U.S. National Register of Historic Places
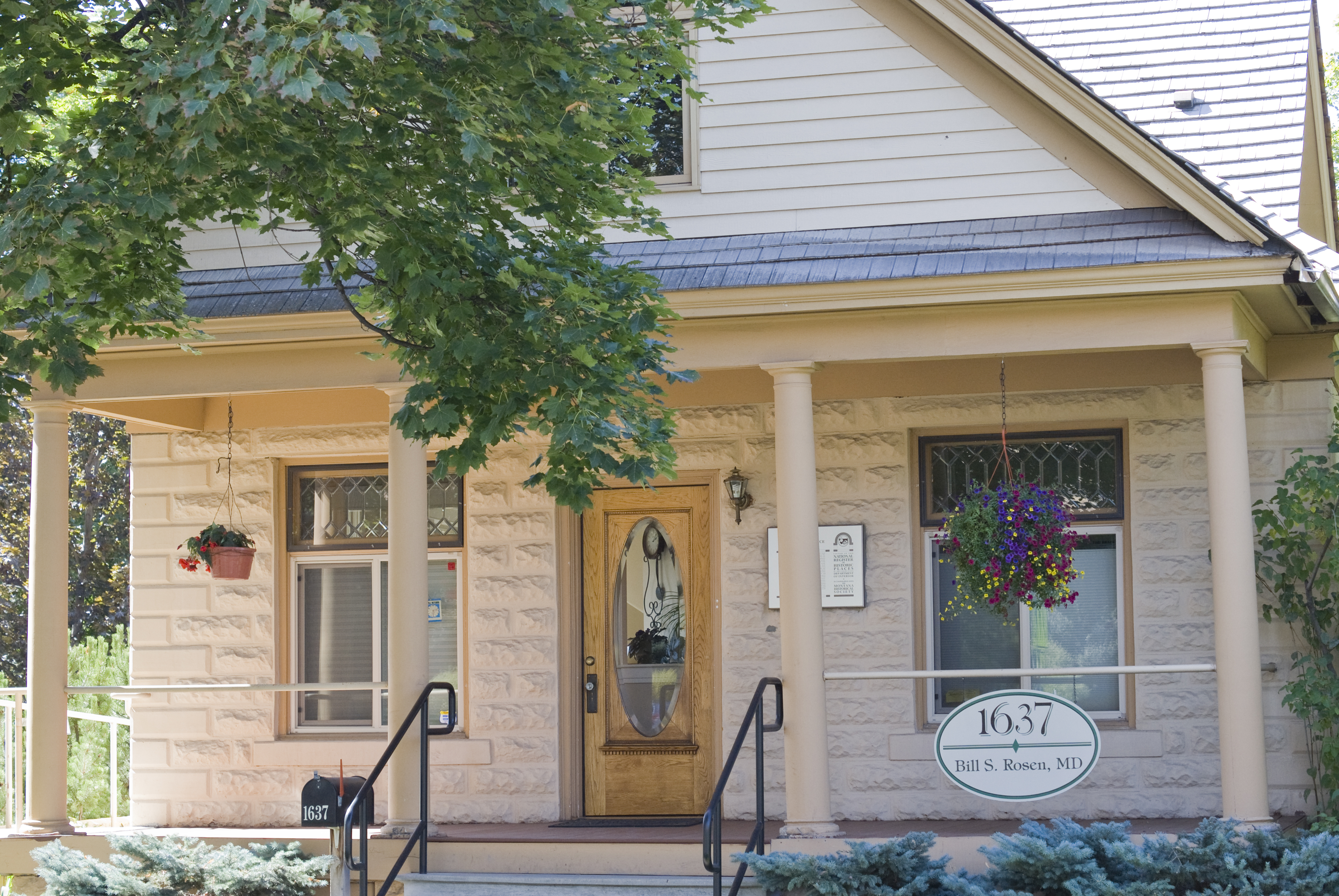
- Front of the Bellows house

- Location within Montana Location within the United States
- Location: 1637 S. Higgins Ave., Missoula, Montana
- Coordinates: 46°51′19.0002″N 113°59′48.9978″W
- Built: 1909
- NRHP reference No.: 96000120
- Added to NRHP: February 22, 1996

The Bellows Residence is a historic house located at 1637 South Higgins Avenue in Missoula, Montana. It is both an unusual and well-preserved example of cast concrete residential construction in Missoula, and a representative example of Neoclassical architecture, popular during the early years of the 20th century.

== Description and history ==
The Bellows Residence was built in 1909. The interior of the residence retains many of the historic design elements, although it was altered to some degree between 1992 and 1994 for use as a medical clinic. To meet code requirements, the first floor was rearranged. The stairway was moved, the hallway was widened, and the bathroom was remodeled. On the second floor, the ceiling height was increased, and the bathroom was re-configured. In addition, the basement was dug out to legal code ceiling height.

Throughout the renovation process, a concerted effort was made to preserve the historic character of the building. Original windows were repaired and retained, and the extant wood trim and fir floors were refurbished. Where missing, new members were milled to match the originals.

A wood-frame, stucco, flat roof garage with concrete foundation, built sometime after 1951, is located at the rear of the property.

It was listed on the National Register of Historic Places in 1996.
