= Seeley Lake (lake) =

Glacial lake in Montana, United States

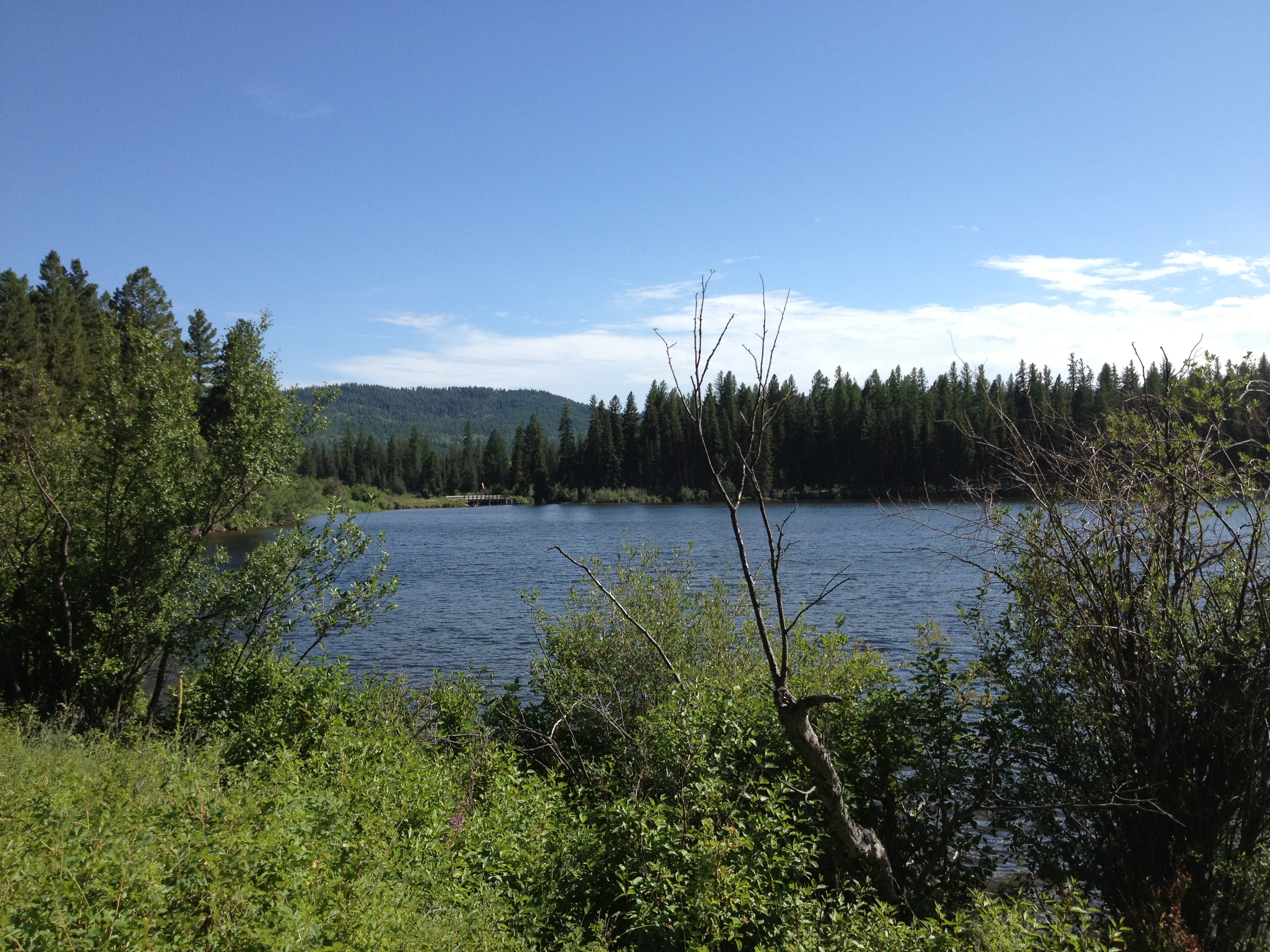
- Image of Seeley Lake

- Location in Montana
- Location: Missoula County, Montana, US
- Coordinates: 47°11′N 113°31′W
- Type: Glacial
- Etymology: Named after Jasper B. Seely, the area's first forest ranger; spelling altered by surveyors
- Primary inflows: Clearwater River
- Primary outflows: Clearwater River
- Surface area: 1,031 acres (417 ha)
- Average depth: 56 ft (17 m)
- Max. depth: 125 ft (38 m)
- Water volume: 58,464 acre⋅ft (72,114,000 m^{3})
- Surface elevation: 3,998 ft (1,219 m)

Seeley Lake is a natural glacial lake located in Missoula County, Montana, within the Lolo National Forest. It lies immediately west of the community of Seeley Lake and is part of the Clearwater River chain of lakes in western Montana. The lake is a popular destination for outdoor recreation and is notable for its ecological diversity and role in regional watershed health.

== Geography ==
Seeley Lake covers 1,031 acres (417 ha) and lies at an elevation of about 3,998 feet (1,219 m). It was formed by glacial activity during the last ice age. The lake is both fed and drained by the Clearwater River, which flows northward and connects a chain of glacial lakes extending toward the Blackfoot River. The surrounding landscape includes the Swan and Mission Mountains to the east and west, respectively.

== History ==
=== Name origin ===
The lake is named after Jasper B. Seely, a forest ranger assigned to the Lewis and Clark Forest Reserve in the early 20th century. His surname was misspelled as “Seeley” by a U.S. Geological Survey mapping crew, and the error was later applied to both the lake and the nearby community. Seely was the first ranger and sole year-long resident in the area at the time. He played a foundational role in establishing federal forest management in the region, which would later become part of the Lolo National Forest.

=== Logging and timber transport ===
Seeley Lake was historically significant to the Montana timber industry. Logging activity around the lake began in the 1890s, with timber floated across the lake and down the Clearwater River to mills such as the Bonner Mill near Missoula. In 1906, the U.S. Forest Service conducted one of its first major timber sales in the region, selling 50 million board feet of larch, fir, and pine to the Anaconda Company. Logging operations were conducted primarily in winter, and the lake was used to stage and move logs during spring runoff.

Western larch presented challenges due to its density, which caused it to sink in water. To address this, loggers bundled larch logs with more buoyant pine and constructed splash dams to facilitate log drives. A major drive in 1908 coincided with spring flooding, enabling large-scale transport of timber downriver.

=== Decline of timber industry ===
While large-scale log drives ended by the mid-20th century, smaller-scale forestry operations continued in the area. Pyramid Mountain Lumber, the local mill, remained a key part of the regional economy until it closed in 2024, marking the end of commercial milling in the Seeley Lake area.

== Ecology ==
Seeley Lake and its surrounding riparian and forested ecosystems are home to diverse wildlife and plant species. The lake supports fish populations including rainbow trout, kokanee salmon, and northern pike. Its surrounding forests consist of western larch, Douglas fir, and lodgepole pine, with fauna such as moose, elk, bald eagles, loons, grizzly bears, and black bears present in the broader watershed. The lake is also home to notable limnological phenomena such as seasonal "larch balls," aggregations of needles caused by wave action.

Like many glacial lakes in western Montana, Seeley Lake supports both native and introduced fish species. The introduction of nonnative species, particularly predatory fish such as northern pike, has impacted native populations through competition and predation. Montana Fish, Wildlife & Parks actively manages fisheries through stocking, harvest regulations, and angler education efforts.

=== Fish species ===
Seeley Lake contains a mix of native and introduced coldwater and warmwater fish species. The lake is actively managed by Montana Fish, Wildlife & Parks for recreational fishing and aquatic ecosystem health.

Fish species found in Seeley Lake
Common name	Scientific name	Group	Water type	Origin
Bull trout	Salvelinus confluentus	Trout	Coldwater	Native
Largescale sucker	Catostomus macrocheilus	Sucker	Warmwater	Native
Longnose sucker	Catostomus catostomus	Sucker	Warmwater	Native
Mountain whitefish	Prosopium williamsoni	Trout	Coldwater	Native
Northern pikeminnow	Ptychocheilus oregonensis	Minnow	Warmwater	Native
Peamouth	Mylocheilus caurinus	Minnow	Warmwater	Native
Westslope cutthroat trout	Oncorhynchus lewisi	Trout	Coldwater	Native
Brown trout	Salmo trutta	Trout	Coldwater	Introduced
Kokanee salmon	Oncorhynchus nerka	Trout	Coldwater	Introduced
Largemouth bass	Micropterus nigricans	Sunfish	Warmwater	Introduced
Northern pike	Esox lucius	Pike	Warmwater	Introduced
Pumpkinseed	Lepomis gibbosus	Sunfish	Warmwater	Introduced
Rainbow trout	Oncorhynchus mykiss	Trout	Coldwater	Introduced
Yellow perch	Perca flavescens	Perch	Warmwater	Introduced

== Bathymetry ==
Montana Fish, Wildlife & Parks has produced a detailed bathymetric survey of Seeley Lake, showing underwater contours and depth gradients. The maximum depth is approximately 56 feet (17 m), with underwater topography shaped by glacial activity. Shorelines, islands, and depth contours are available in digitized formats and are used for ecological monitoring and public access planning.

== Recreation ==
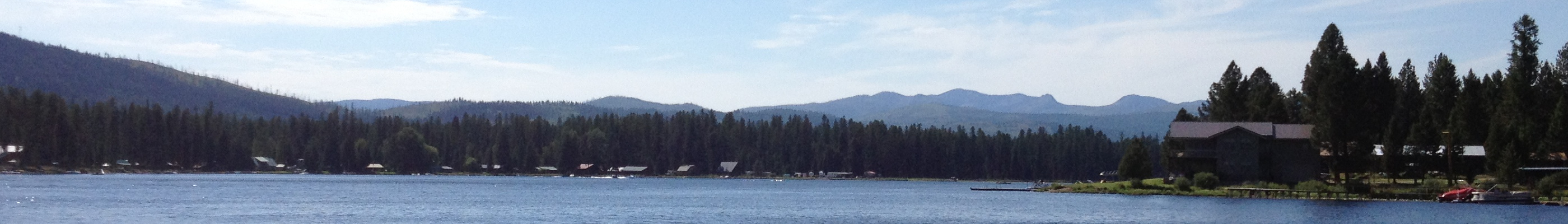
View of Sealey Lake

Seeley Lake is a regional destination for fishing, boating, kayaking, and swimming. The lake’s public access points include boat launches and campgrounds, most notably the Big Larch Campground managed by the U.S. Forest Service. Popular trails in the vicinity include the Morrell Falls National Recreation Trail. Seasonal events such as Winterfest and the Loon and Fish Festival also draw visitors to the area.

== Conservation ==
Ongoing conservation and monitoring efforts are coordinated by state agencies and local organizations such as the Clearwater Resource Council. Concerns include shoreline erosion, aquatic invasive species, and nutrient loading from nearby development. Water quality monitoring and habitat protection projects are active in the watershed, particularly in relation to increasing recreational use.

== See also ==
- List of lakes in Montana
- Lolo National Forest
- Seeley Lake, Montana
