= Missoula County Courthouse =

- U.S. National Register of Historic Places
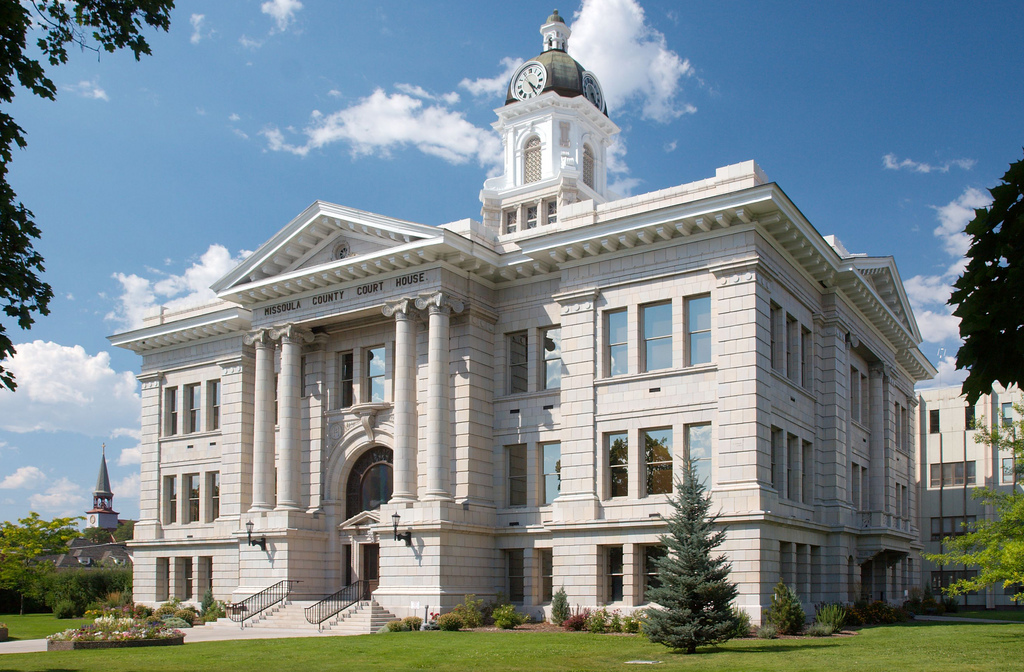

- Location within Montana Location within the United States
- Location: 220 W Broadway, Missoula, Montana
- Coordinates: 46°52′24″N 113°59′42″W
- Area: 2 acres (0.81 ha)
- Built: 1908
- Built by: Williams & Oliver Co.
- Architect: A.J. Gibson
- Architectural style: Classical Revival
- NRHP reference No.: 76001125
- Added to NRHP: September 1, 1976

The Missoula County Courthouse is located in Missoula, Montana, in the center of Downtown Missoula. It is located at 200 West Broadway, Missoula Montana. It was added to the National Register of Historic Places listings on September 1, 1976.

It is a two-story building on an elevated basement, with walls of native sandstone. It was designed by Missoula architect A.J. Gibson and built during 1908-10 by Spokane contractor Williams & Oliver Co. on the site of the previous county courthouse.
