= Fred T. Sterling House =

Historic house in Montana, United States

- U.S. National Register of Historic Places
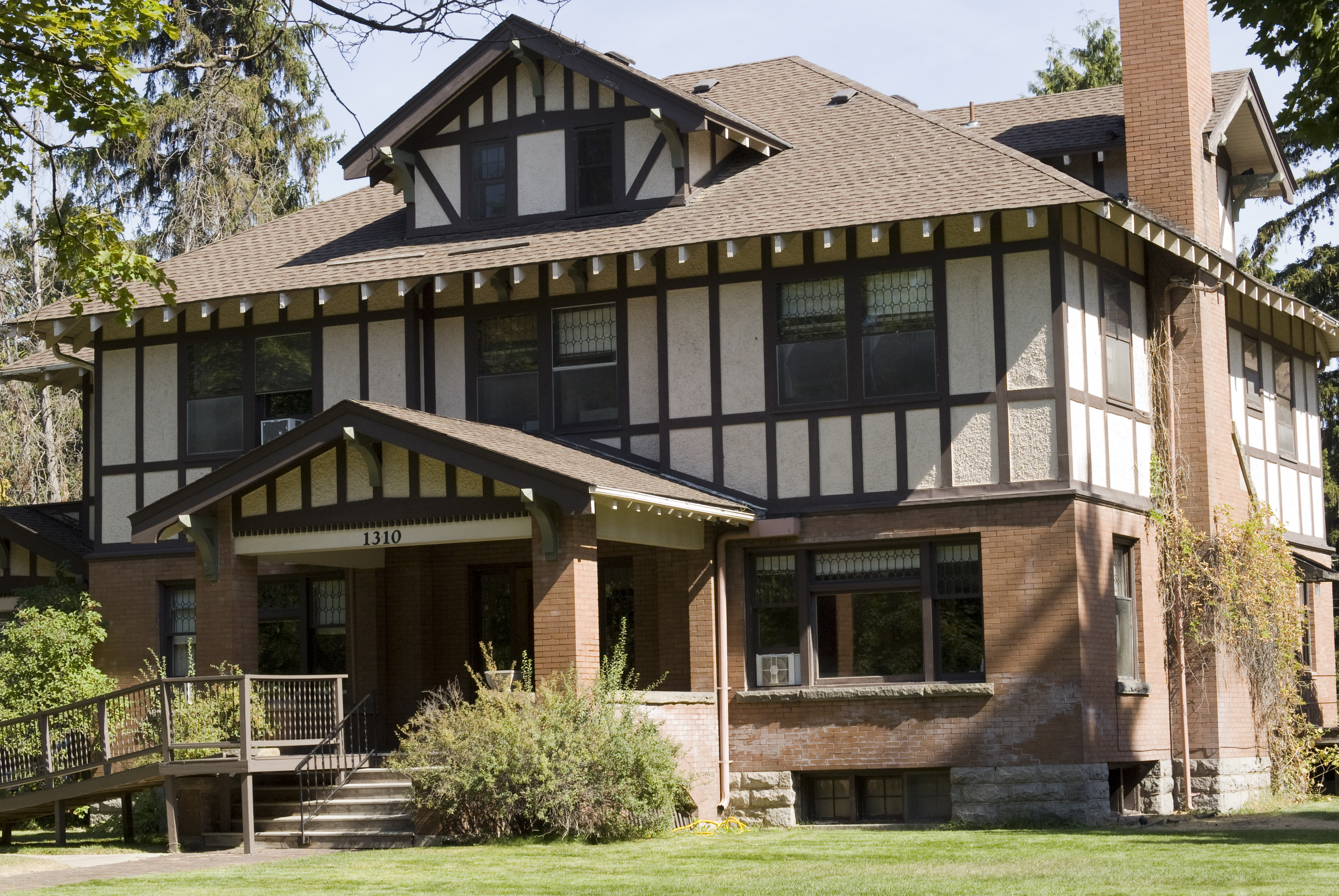
- Fred T. Sterling house at 1310 Gerald Ave., Missoula, MT

- Location within Montana Location within the United States
- Location: 1310 Gerald Ave., Missoula, Montana 46.858735,-113.995226
- Coordinates: 46°51′31.446″N 113°59′42.8136″W
- Area: 0.5 acres (0.20 ha)
- Built: 1912
- Architect: Albert J. Gibson
- Architectural style: Arts and Crafts / Prairie School
- NRHP reference No.: 83001074
- Added to NRHP: July 7, 1983

The Fred T. Sterling House is an Arts & Crafts style residence in Missoula, Montana, designed by the architect Albert J. Gibson and built in 1912 for a businessman, Frederick Sterling, and his wife Lucina.
