= Gleim Building =

- U.S. National Register of Historic Places
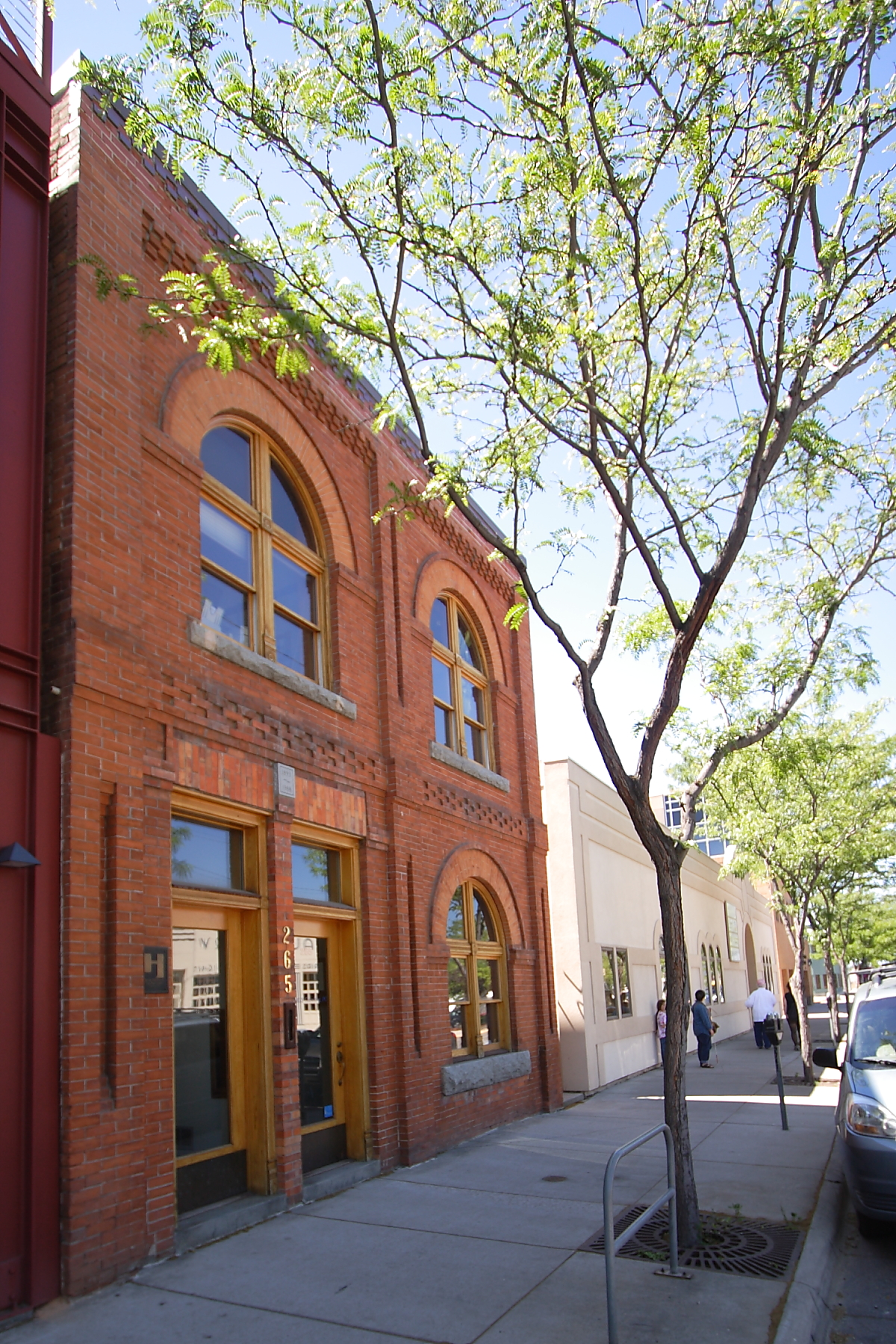

- Location within Montana Location within the United States
- Location: 265 West Front Street, Missoula, Montana
- Coordinates: 46°52′20″N 113°59′50″W
- Built: 1893
- Architectural style: Romanesque Revival
- NRHP reference No.: 90000653
- Added to NRHP: April 30, 1990

The Gleim Building, 265 W. Front St., Missoula, Montana, was a brothel constructed in 1893 for Mary Gleim, a notorious madam who owned at least eight "female boarding houses". This building serves as an example of a vernacular adaptation of Romanesque architecture.

It was listed on the National Register of Historic Places in 1990.

== History ==
Brothels were present along West Front Street but the number expanded considerably after the arrival of the Northern Pacific Railway and its construction crews in the 1880s. The building was built for Missoula's most prominent madam, Mary Gleim, in 1893 and reflects the impact railroads had on Missoula early in its history. Gleim ran her brothel empire from this building.

Gleim stopped running the brothel in 1903 but retained the freehold. The building's use as a brothel ended in 1916 when the city bowed to public pressure and closed the red-light district. Subsequent owners operated an automobile repair shop and a billiard parlor from the premises for several decades. The building became an adult theater in the 1970s. By the 1980s the building had deteriorated considerably and was bought by architect James Hoffman who restored the building.

The building has a plaque on the wall in tribute to Mary Gleim.

== Architecture ==
The building was built of brick as a precaution against fire, following the fire that devastated the area in 1872.

Built in the vernacular adaptation of Romanesque architecture first made popular by Boston architect Henry Hobson Richardson in the 1870s, the building features brick corbelling, arched windows, checkerboard banding, and rusticated granite sills. The building's facade and its east and west sides have been restored to their original appearance.

== Gleim Building II ==
Mary Gleim also had another of her buildings rebuilt in brick at 255-257 West Front Street, sometime between 1893 and 1902. The red brick building was restored in 1995 by David Paoli and listed on the National Register of Historic Places the same year.

== Mary Gleim ==
Mary Gleim came to Missoula in 1888 with her husband, and quickly saw the potential for prostitution with the large number of railroad workers in the town. She set up brothels one after another in West Front Street and ruled them with a fist of iron, becoming the "Queen of Missoula's Bad Lands".

Commonly known as "Mother Gleim", she was one of Missoula's characters and eventually owned a considerable number of properties in Missoula and elsewhere. Weighing 300 lbs, Gleim, in addition to brothel-keeping, was reputed to be a smuggler of diamonds, opium, and Chinese railroad workers. She was arrested for the attempted murder of rival Bobby Burns by having his house blown up with dynamite on 12 February 1894. She was held in the county jail whilst awaiting trial. Officers allowed Gleim out of the jail to collect rents from her properties in the red-light districts. Whilst out, she assaulted a rival madam but no charges were brought. Future Governor of Montana, Joseph M. Dixon, was the prosecutor at her trial, where she was found guilty and sentenced to 14 years imprisonment in May 1894. Whilst incarcerated in Deer Lodge, Gleim was assaulted by another inmate, but never recovered fully from the stab wounds that were inflicted on her. Her conviction was overturned after she had served little more than a year in prison.

Gleim died in 1914, leaving an estate of $148,000. She left explicit instructions for her burial in the city cemetery. Whilst other headstones faced east and west, Gleim's faced the railroad so she could say goodbye to the railroad men who were her customers.

== Bibliography ==
- Foley, Jodie; Axline, Jon (2011). Speaking Ill of the Dead: Jerks in Montana History. Rowman & Littlefield. ISBN 9780762768431.
- MacKell, Jan (2011). Red Light Women of the Rocky Mountains. UNM Press. ISBN 9780826346124.
- Mathews, Allan James (2002). A Guide to Historic Missoula. Montana Historical Society. ISBN 9780917298899.
- Olson, Eric (2015). Courting Justice: More Montana Courthouse Tales. Dog Ear Publishing. ISBN 9781457540240.
- Parrett, Nann (2017). Montana Madams. Farcountry Press. ISBN 9781560376675.
