= Seeley Lake, Montana =

- Census-designated place
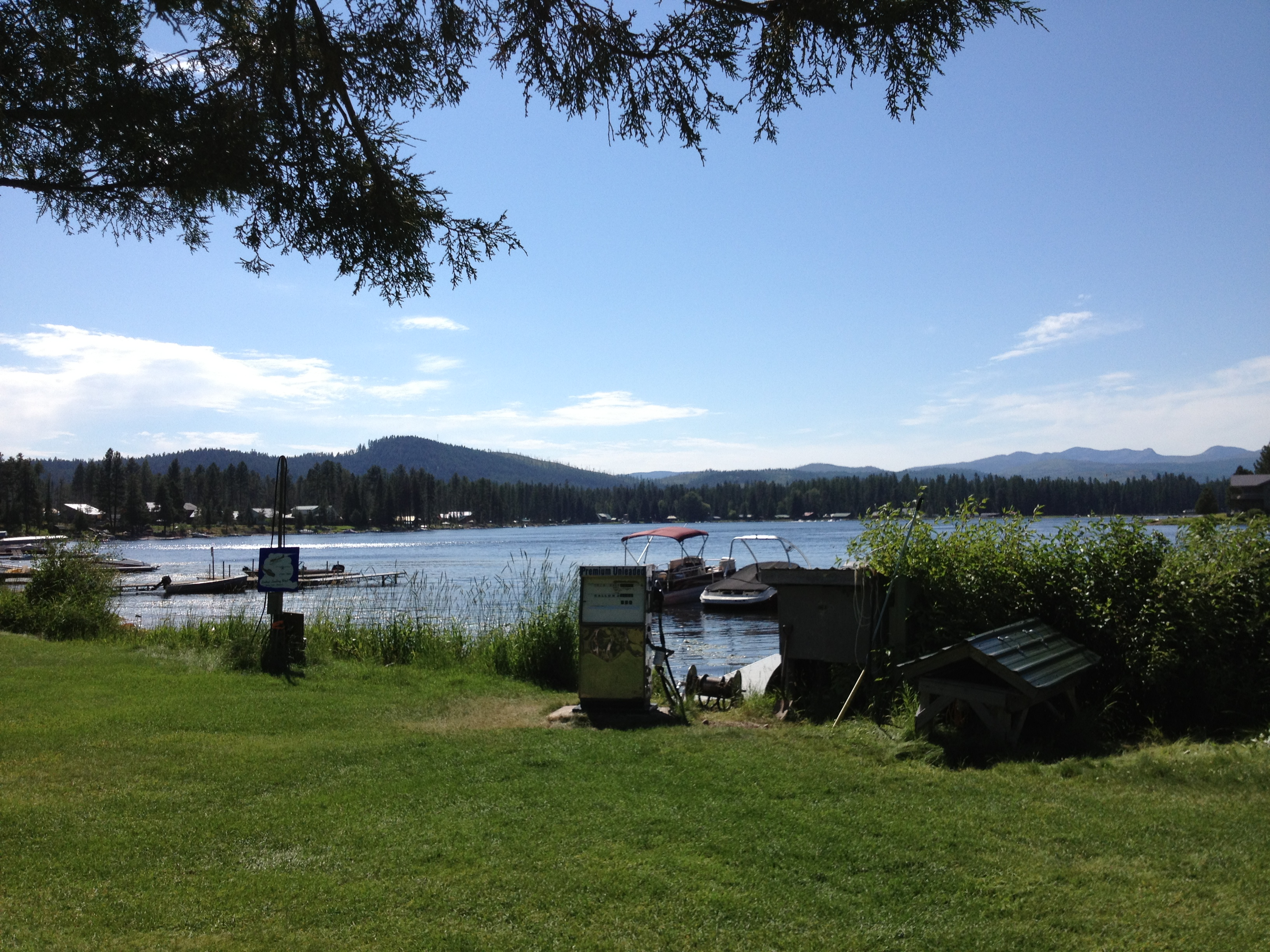

- Location in Missoula County and the state of Montana
- Coordinates: 47°09′45″N 113°28′31″W
- Country: United States
- State: Montana
- County: Missoula

Government
  - Type: Unincorporated community
  - Body: Missoula County Board of County Commissioners

Area
  - Total: 13.13 sq mi (34.00 km^{2})
  - Land: 12.26 sq mi (31.75 km^{2})
  - Water: 0.87 sq mi (2.25 km^{2})
- Elevation: 4,127 ft (1,258 m)

Population (2020)
  - Total: 1,682
  - Density: 137.2/sq mi (52.97/km^{2})
- Time zone: UTC-7 (Mountain (MST))
  - Summer (DST): UTC-6 (MDT)
- ZIP code: 59868
- Area code: 406
- FIPS code: 30-67150
- GNIS feature ID: 2409304

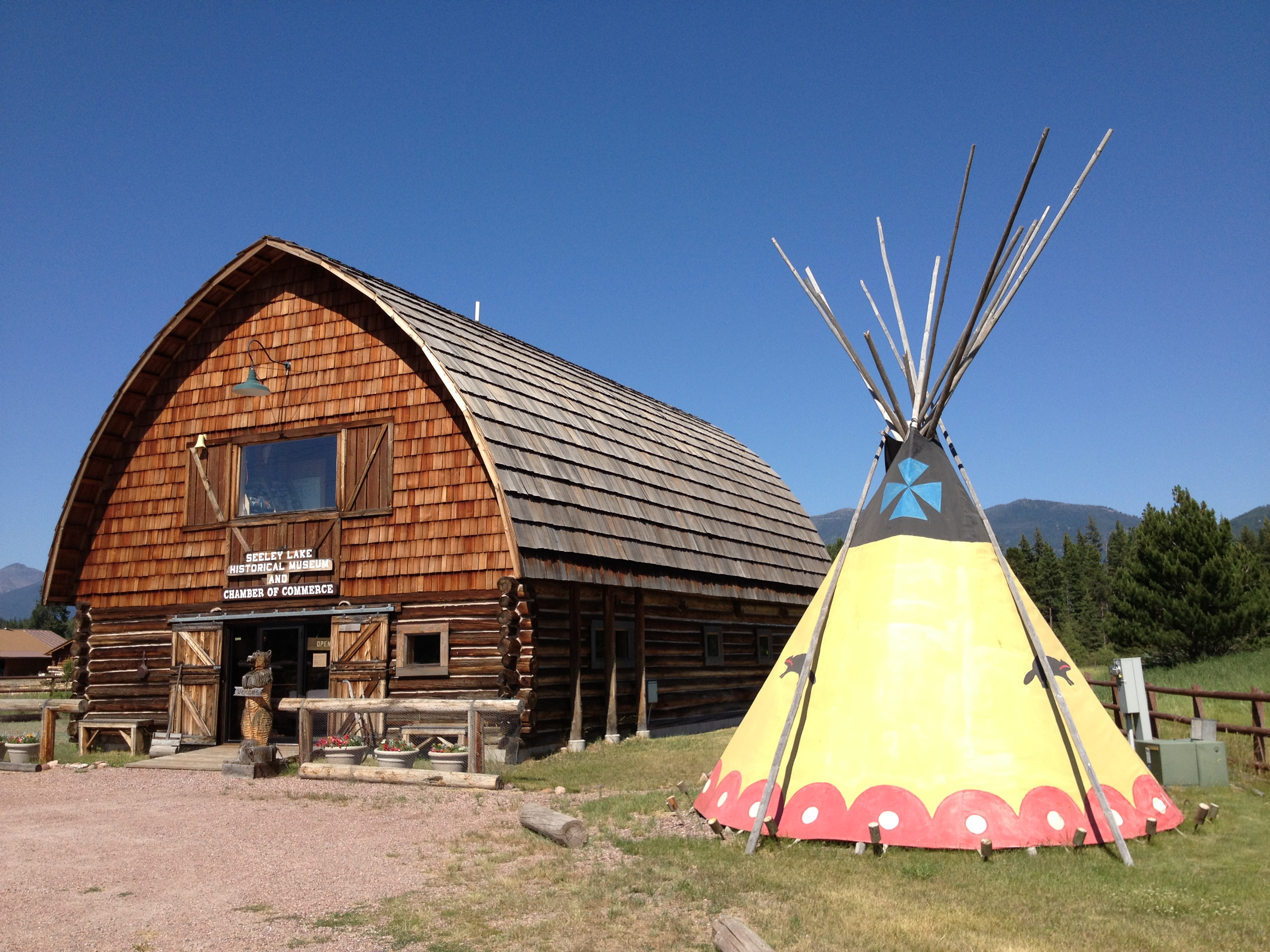
Seeley Lake Historical Society

Seeley Lake is an unincorporated community and census-designated place (CDP) in Missoula County, Montana, United States. It is part of the Missoula metropolitan area. The town sits beside the 1,030-acre (420 ha) Seeley Lake. The population was 1,682 at the 2020 census. The town contains a site listed on the National Register of Historic Places, Double Arrow Lodge.

== History ==
The community of Seeley Lake is named for Jasper B. Seely, who built a cabin on what was in 1881 known as Clearwater Lake. Seely served as the first ranger on the Lewis and Clarke Forest Reserve. The first road to Seeley Lake came in 1895.

== Governance ==
Seeley Lake is an unincorporated community and does not have a consolidated municipal government. The community is primarily governed by the Missoula County Board of County Commissioners based in the city of Missoula. The community is also supported by locally-governed Special Districts that manage specific services such as those for schools, fire response, and water supply. These special districts are composed of elected board members chosen by voters within the specific district. The Seeley Lake Community Foundation, a 501c3 non-profit, also serves as a mechanism for addressing local issues within the community, organizing local leadership and serving as unofficial liaisons to municipal officials in Missoula County.

== Geography ==
Seeley Lake is in northeastern Missoula County and is bordered to the north by Powell County. The southern half of Seeley Lake, the water body, is in the northwest part of the census-designated place. The Clearwater River forms the southwest edge of the community, flowing out of the lake and running south toward the Blackfoot River, part of the watershed of the Clark Fork River.

Montana Highway 83 passes through the community, leading south 14 miles (23 km) to Montana Highway 200 at Clearwater Junction and north 74 miles (119 km) to Bigfork. The city of Missoula is 52 miles (84 km) to the southwest via highways 83 and 200.

According to the U.S. Census Bureau, the Seeley Lake CDP has a total area of 13.1 square miles (34 km^{2}), of which 12.3 square miles (32 km^{2}) are land and 0.9 square miles (2.3 km^{2}), or 6.63%, are water.

=== Climate ===
According to the Köppen Climate Classification system, Seeley Lake has a warm-summer humid continental climate, abbreviated "Dfb" on climate maps. The hottest temperature recorded in Seeley Lake was 102 °F (38.9 °C) on July 7, 2007, while the coldest temperature recorded was −53 °F (−47.2 °C) on January 7, 1937.

Climate data for Seeley Lake, Montana, 1991–2020 normals, extremes 1936–present
Month	Jan	Feb	Mar	Apr	May	Jun	Jul	Aug	Sep	Oct	Nov	Dec	Year
Record high °F (°C)	55 (13)	62 (17)	73 (23)	86 (30)	93 (34)	98 (37)	102 (39)	101 (38)	96 (36)	86 (30)	66 (19)	61 (16)	102 (39)
Mean maximum °F (°C)	44.5 (6.9)	49.8 (9.9)	59.3 (15.2)	69.4 (20.8)	80.4 (26.9)	87.1 (30.6)	93.6 (34.2)	93.4 (34.1)	88.3 (31.3)	75.3 (24.1)	54.5 (12.5)	43.1 (6.2)	95.2 (35.1)
Mean daily maximum °F (°C)	32.0 (0.0)	36.5 (2.5)	45.1 (7.3)	53.6 (12.0)	64.5 (18.1)	72.2 (22.3)	83.2 (28.4)	82.9 (28.3)	72.8 (22.7)	56.0 (13.3)	39.6 (4.2)	30.6 (−0.8)	55.8 (13.2)
Daily mean °F (°C)	22.0 (−5.6)	24.7 (−4.1)	32.5 (0.3)	40.2 (4.6)	49.4 (9.7)	56.4 (13.6)	63.7 (17.6)	62.8 (17.1)	54.6 (12.6)	42.4 (5.8)	30.5 (−0.8)	21.8 (−5.7)	41.8 (5.4)
Mean daily minimum °F (°C)	12.1 (−11.1)	12.8 (−10.7)	19.9 (−6.7)	26.8 (−2.9)	34.2 (1.2)	40.5 (4.7)	44.3 (6.8)	42.6 (5.9)	36.5 (2.5)	28.7 (−1.8)	21.3 (−5.9)	13.0 (−10.6)	27.7 (−2.4)
Mean minimum °F (°C)	−18.2 (−27.9)	−14.9 (−26.1)	−0.5 (−18.1)	15.3 (−9.3)	23.1 (−4.9)	30.3 (−0.9)	35.3 (1.8)	33.3 (0.7)	26.1 (−3.3)	13.3 (−10.4)	1.6 (−16.9)	−10.4 (−23.6)	−27.1 (−32.8)
Record low °F (°C)	−53 (−47)	−45 (−43)	−42 (−41)	−4 (−20)	13 (−11)	23 (−5)	28 (−2)	24 (−4)	15 (−9)	−10 (−23)	−31 (−35)	−44 (−42)	−53 (−47)
Average precipitation inches (mm)	2.63 (67)	1.92 (49)	1.44 (37)	1.37 (35)	1.88 (48)	2.31 (59)	1.07 (27)	0.96 (24)	1.19 (30)	1.96 (50)	2.52 (64)	2.35 (60)	21.60 (549)
Average snowfall inches (cm)	30.4 (77)	18.5 (47)	15.2 (39)	4.5 (11)	0.7 (1.8)	0.4 (1.0)	0.0 (0.0)	0.0 (0.0)	0.0 (0.0)	2.3 (5.8)	18.0 (46)	28.9 (73)	118.9 (301.6)
Average extreme snow depth inches (cm)	24.0 (61)	26.0 (66)	23.3 (59)	7.9 (20)	0.0 (0.0)	0.0 (0.0)	0.0 (0.0)	0.0 (0.0)	0.0 (0.0)	1.3 (3.3)	7.1 (18)	15.7 (40)	29.1 (74)
Average precipitation days (≥ 0.01 in)	15.8	11.3	11.9	11.5	11.7	13.7	7.0	7.3	8.9	11.6	13.6	15.6	139.9
Average snowy days (≥ 0.1 in)	13.8	9.6	7.9	3.5	0.5	0.1	0.0	0.0	0.0	1.3	8.5	14.0	59.2
Source 1: NOAA
Source 2: National Weather Service

== Aftermath of Rice Ridge Fire ==
In late summer 2017, Seeley Lake suffered an extended period of hazardous air quality as a result of the Rice Ridge Fire, prompting local officials to urge all residents to evacuate their homes. Scooper aircraft were used to fetch water from Seeley Lake to fight the fire. A followup study will measure the health impacts of the smoke.

== Demographics ==
Historical population
Census	Pop.	Note	%±
2000	1,436		—
2010	1,659		15.5%
2020	1,682		1.4%
U.S. Decennial Census

=== 2020 census ===
As of the 2020 census, Seeley Lake had a population of 1,682. The median age was 54.4 years. 14.8% of residents were under the age of 18 and 29.6% of residents were 65 years of age or older. For every 100 females there were 108.2 males, and for every 100 females age 18 and over there were 103.6 males age 18 and over.

0.0% of residents lived in urban areas, while 100.0% lived in rural areas.

There were 793 households in Seeley Lake, of which 15.5% had children under the age of 18 living in them. Of all households, 52.3% were married-couple households, 24.3% were households with a male householder and no spouse or partner present, and 17.5% were households with a female householder and no spouse or partner present. About 33.0% of all households were made up of individuals and 15.4% had someone living alone who was 65 years of age or older.

There were 1,129 housing units, of which 29.8% were vacant. The homeowner vacancy rate was 0.5% and the rental vacancy rate was 2.0%.

Racial composition as of the 2020 census
Race	Number	Percent
White	1,545	91.9%
Black or African American	4	0.2%
American Indian and Alaska Native	20	1.2%
Asian	3	0.2%
Native Hawaiian and Other Pacific Islander	0	0.0%
Some other race	24	1.4%
Two or more races	86	5.1%
Hispanic or Latino (of any race)	55	3.3%

=== 2010 census ===
As of the 2010 census, there were 1,659 people, 589 households, and 411 families residing in the CDP. The population density was 131.9 inhabitants per square mile (50.9/km^{2}). There were 938 housing units at an average density of 86.2 per square mile (33.3/km^{2}). The racial makeup of the CDP was 96.94% White, 0.07% African American, 1.46% Native American, 0.21% Asian, 0.49% from other races, and 0.84% from two or more races. Hispanic or Latino of any race were 1.46% of the population.

There were 589 households, out of which 29.2% had children under the age of 18 living with them, 59.4% were married couples living together, 5.1% had a female householder with no husband present, and 30.1% were non-families. 24.3% of all households were made up of individuals, and 6.3% had someone living alone who was 65 years of age or older. The average household size was 2.44 and the average family size was 2.89.

In the CDP, the population was spread out, with 25.3% under the age of 18, 5.2% from 18 to 24, 28.3% from 25 to 44, 29.5% from 45 to 64, and 11.8% who were 65 years of age or older. The median age was 41 years. For every 100 females, there were 113.4 males. For every 100 females age 18 and over, there were 112.1 males.

=== Income and poverty ===
The median income for a household in the CDP was $35,101, and the median income for a family was $38,188. Males had a median income of $30,000 versus $18,269 for females. The per capita income for the CDP was $18,825. About 7.0% of families and 10.6% of the population were below the poverty line, including 14.4% of those under age 18 and 4.8% of those age 65 or over.

== Education ==
The community is in the Seeley Lake Elementary School District and the Missoula High School District. In 2025, the town's Middle School, Seeley Lake 7-8, was ranked number #33 in Montana according to U.S. News and World Report.

Seeley-Swan High School provides education for 9th through 12th grade. Their mascot is the Blackhawks.

The Missoula Public Library has a branch location in Seeley Lake.

== Media ==
The Seeley-Swan Pathfinder is the newspaper for Seeley Lake. It is published weekly.

== See also ==
- Camp Paxson Boy Scout Camp
- Larch ball
