= 2014 United States Senate elections =

- November 4, 2014 (Note: A runoff election was held in Louisiana on December 6.)
- Class 2

36 (Note: 33 Class 2 seats, as well as 3 Class 3 seats in special election) of the 100 seats in the United States Senate 51 seats needed for a majority
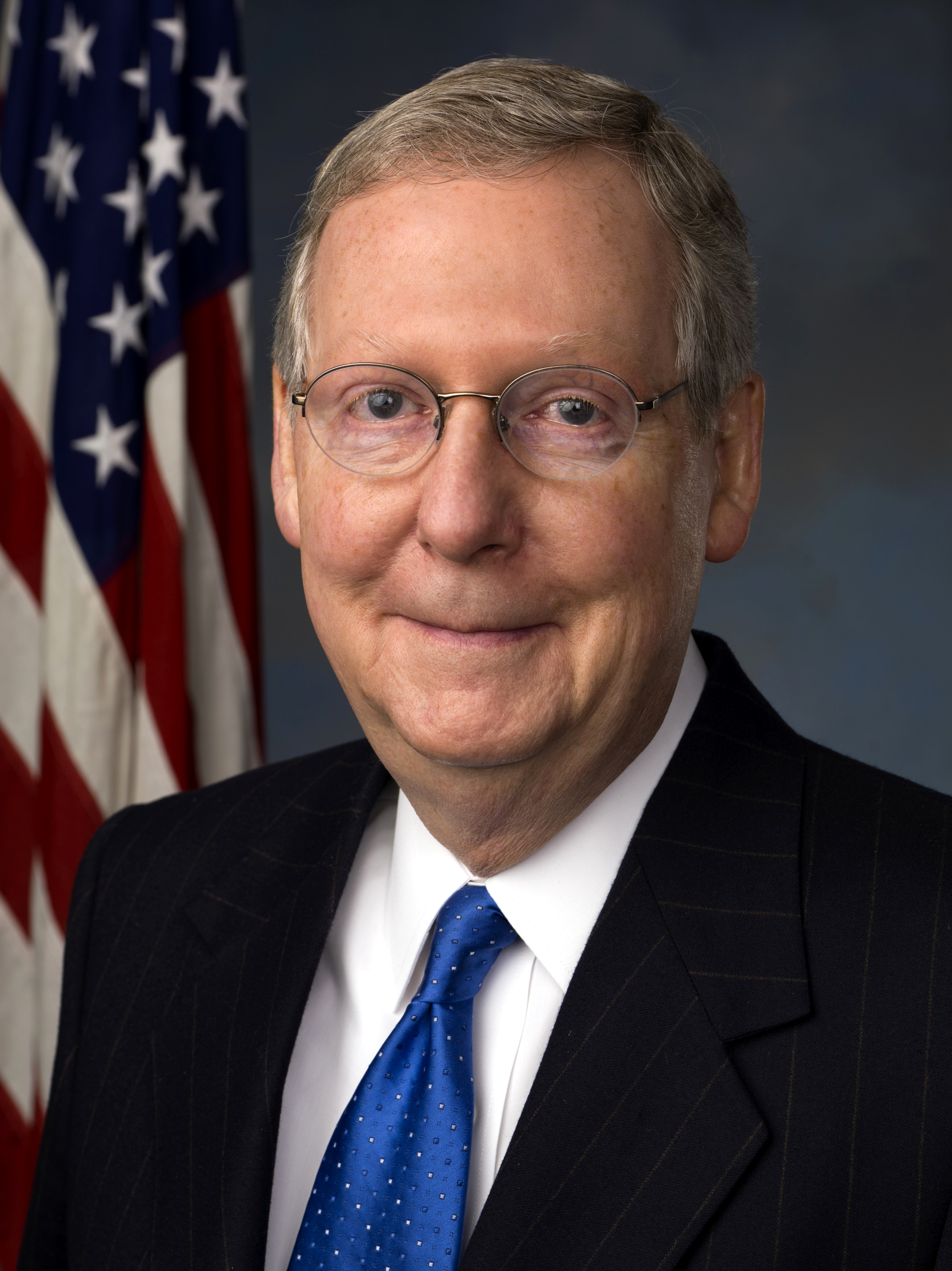

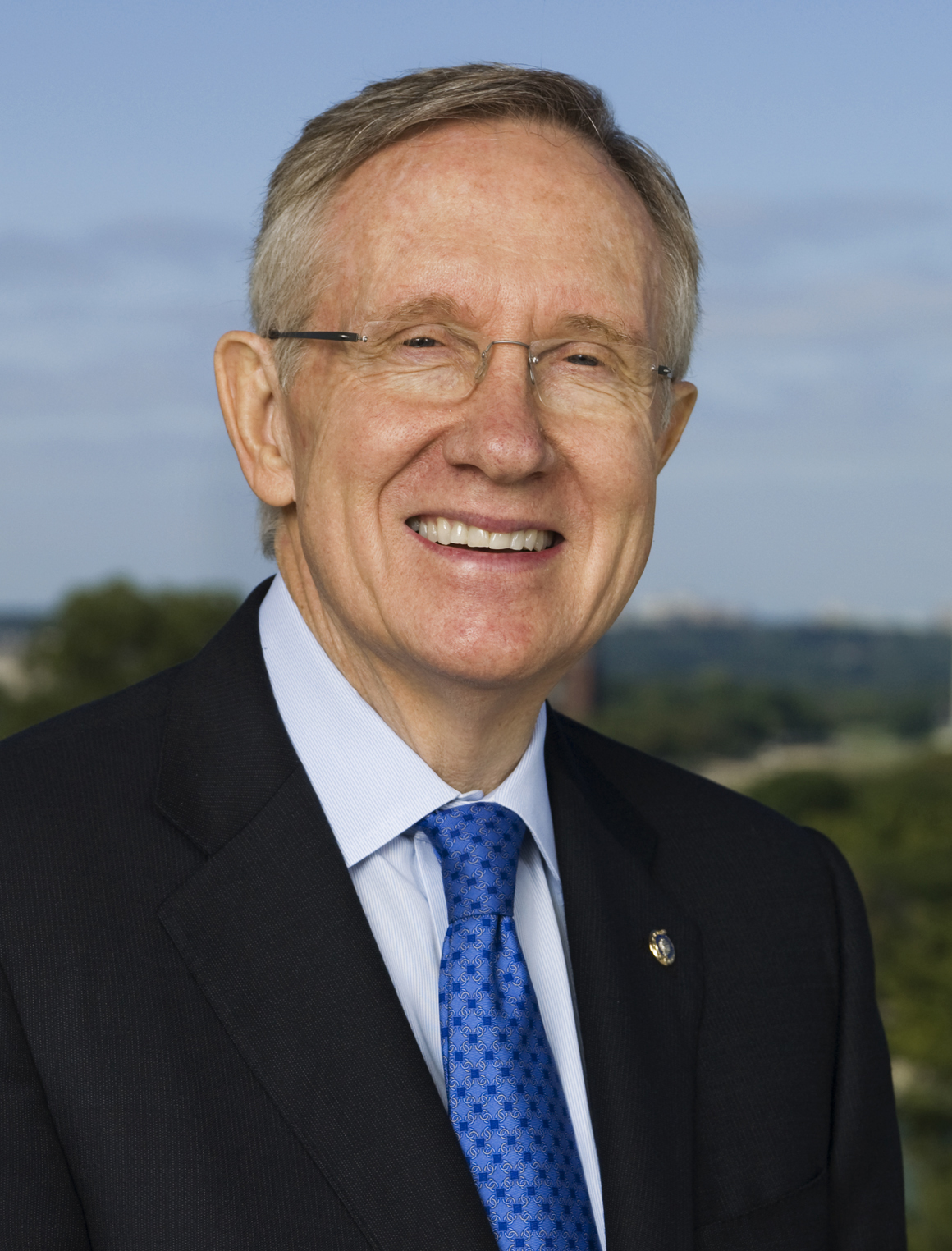
	Majority party	Minority party
Leader	Mitch McConnell	Harry Reid
Party	Republican	Democratic
Leader since	January 3, 2007	January 3, 2005
Leader's seat	Kentucky	Nevada
Seats before	45	53
Seats after	54	44
Seat change	▲9	▼9
Popular vote	22,598,628	19,302,133
Percentage	51.39%	43.89%
Seats up	15	21
Races won	24	12
	Third party
Party	Independent
Seats before	2 (Note: Both independent senators—Bernie Sanders (VT) and Angus King (ME)—caucused with the Democratic Party.)
Seats after	2
Seat change	Steady
Popular vote	672,196
Percentage	1.53%
Seats up	0
Races won	0
- Results of the elections: Democratic hold Republican hold Republican gain No election Rectangular inset (Okla. & S.C.): both seats up for election
Majority Leader before election
Harry Reid
Democratic
Elected Majority Leader
Mitch McConnell
Republican

The 2014 United States Senate elections were held on November 4, 2014. A total of 36 seats in the 100-member U.S. Senate were contested. There were 33 Class 2 seats contested for regular six-year terms to be served from January 3, 2015, to January 3, 2021, and three Class 3 seats were contested in special elections due to Senate vacancies. The elections marked 100 years of direct elections of U.S. senators. Going into the elections, 21 of the contested seats were held by the Democratic Party, while 15 were held by the Republican Party.

The Republicans regained the majority of the Senate in the 114th Congress, which started in January 2015; the Republicans had not controlled the Senate since January 2007. They needed a net gain of at least six seats to obtain a majority and were projected by polls to do so. On election night, they held all of their seats and gained nine Democratic-held seats. Republicans defeated five Democratic incumbents: Mark Begich of Alaska lost to Dan Sullivan, Mark Pryor of Arkansas lost to Tom Cotton, Mark Udall of Colorado lost to Cory Gardner, Mary Landrieu of Louisiana lost to Bill Cassidy, and Kay Hagan of North Carolina lost to Thom Tillis. Republicans also picked up another four open seats in Iowa, Montana, South Dakota, and West Virginia that were previously held by Democrats. Democrats did not pick up any Republican-held seats, but they did hold an open seat in Michigan.

With a net gain of nine seats, the Republicans made the largest Senate gain by any party since 1980. This is also the first election cycle since 1980 in which more than two incumbent Democratic senators were defeated by their Republican challengers. Days after the election cycle, the United States Election Project estimated that 36.4% of eligible voters voted, 4% lower than the 2010 elections, and possibly the lowest turnout rate since the 1942 election cycle.

This remains the most recent time that a Republican has won a U.S. Senate election in Colorado, and that an incumbent senator was reelected unopposed.

== Partisan composition ==
For a majority, Republicans needed at least 51 seats. Democrats could have retained a majority with 48 seats (assuming the two Independents continued to caucus with them) because the Democratic Vice President Joe Biden would become the tie-breaker. From 1915 to 2013, control of the U.S. Senate flipped in 10 of 50 cycles, or 20% of the time. Republicans had lost ground in the 2012 elections, leading to an internal fight among the Republican leadership over the best strategies and tactics for the 2014 Senate races. By December 2013, eight of the twelve incumbent Republicans running for re-election saw Tea Party challenges. However, Republican incumbents won every primary challenge. Although Democrats saw some opportunities for pickups, the combination of Democratic retirements and numerous Democratic seats up for election in swing states and red states gave Republicans hopes of taking control of the Senate. 7 of the 21 states with Democratic seats up for election in 2014 had voted for Republican Mitt Romney in the 2012 presidential election compared to just one state with a Republican senator who voted for Barack Obama. Democrats also faced the lower voter turnout that accompanies midterm elections.

Poll aggregation website FiveThirtyEight gave the Republican Party a 60% chance of taking control of the Senate as of September 28. Another poll aggregation website, RealClearPolitics, gave the Republican Party a net gain of 7 seats. Due to the closeness of several races, it was initially believed that Senate control might not be decided on election night. Both Louisiana and Georgia were seen as competitive, and both states required a runoff election if no candidate won a majority of the vote.

Two independent candidates (in Kansas and South Dakota) refused to commit to caucusing with either party. In the final months of the race, polls showed them with viable chances of winning, leading some analysts to speculate on the possibility of an "Independent caucus" that could also include Maine Senator Angus King and possibly Vermont Senator Bernie Sanders. However, no Independent won a Senate race in 2014, and King and Sanders continue to caucus with the Democratic Party following the 2014 election cycle.

By midnight ET, most major networks projected that the Republicans would take control of the Senate. The party held all three competitive Republican-held seats (Kentucky, Kansas, and Georgia), and defeated incumbent Democrats in North Carolina, Colorado, and Arkansas. Combined with the pick-ups of open seats in Iowa, Montana, South Dakota, and West Virginia, the Republicans made a net gain of 7 seats before the end of the night. Republicans defeated three incumbent Democrats, a task the party had not accomplished since the 1980 election cycle. Five of the seven confirmed pickups were in states that voted for Mitt Romney in 2012, but two of the seats that Republicans won represented states that voted for Barack Obama in 2012 (Colorado and Iowa). Of the three races that were not called by the end of election night, Alaska and Virginia were still too close to call, while Louisiana held a December 6 runoff election. Virginia declared incumbent Democrat Mark Warner the winner of his race by a narrow margin over Republican Ed Gillespie on November 7, and Alaska declared Dan Sullivan the winner against Democratic incumbent Mark Begich on November 12. Republican Bill Cassidy defeated Democratic incumbent Mary Landrieu in the Louisiana runoff on December 6.

=== Election spending ===
Altogether, at least $3.67 billion was spent by candidates, parties, committees and outside groups in the 2014 election cycle. Spending on the 2014 Senate elections by outside groups (i.e., organizations other than a candidate's campaign, such as super PACs and "dark money" nonprofit groups) more than doubled from 2010. In the 10 competitive races for which data were available, outside groups accounted for 47% of spending, candidates accounted for 41% of spending, and parties accounted for 12% of spending. The Senate race with the most outside spending was in North Carolina, at $80 million, a new record.

The top outside spenders in the 11 most competitive Senate races were the following:

- On the Republican side, the National Republican Senatorial Committee, Crossroads GPS, U.S. Chamber of Commerce, Ending Spending Action Fund, Freedom Partners Action Fund, American Crossroads, and the NRA Political Victory Fund.
- On the Democratic side, the Democratic Senatorial Campaign Committee, Senate Majority PAC, and NextGen Climate Action Committee.

== Results summary ==
The Republican Party made a net gain of nine U.S. Senate seats in the 2014 elections.

Going into the elections, there were 53 Democratic, 45 Republican and 2 independent senators (both of whom caucus with the Democrats). In all, there were 36 elections: 33 senators were up for election this year as class 2 senators, and 3 faced special elections (all from Class 3). Of all these seats, 21 were held by Democrats and 15 were held by Republicans.

↓
44	2	54

Democratic	Independent	Republican

Colored shading indicates party with largest share of that row.

Parties							Total
Parties	Democratic	Republican	Independent	Libertarian	Green	Other	Total
Before these elections	53	45	2	—	—	—	100
Not up	32	30	2	—	—	—	64
Class 1 (2012→2018)	23	8	2	—	—	—	33
Class 3 (2010→2016)	9	22	—	—	—	—	31
Up	21	15	—	—	—	—	36
General: Class 2	20	13	—	—	—	—	33
Special: Class 3	1	2	—	—	—	—	3
Incumbent retired	4	3 (Note: In Oklahoma, Tom Coburn's resignation prompted a special election.)	—	—	—	—	7
Held by same party	1	3	—	—	—	—	4
Replaced by other party	▼3 Democrats replaced by ▲3 Republicans		—	—	—	—	3
Result	1	6	—	—	—	—	7
Incumbent ran	17 (Note: Includes three interim appointees who ran for election.) (Note: John Walsh withdrew from election to represent Montana and was replaced by Amanda Curtis.)	12	—	—	—	—	29
Won election	11 (Note: Includes two interim appointees who won elections to finish their term.)	12	—	—	—	—	23
Lost re-election	▼5 Democrats replaced by ▲5 Republicans		—	—	—	—	5
Lost renomination but held by same party	—	—	—	—	—	—	0
Withdrew from nomination and party lost	▼1 Democrat replaced by ▲1 Republican		—	—	—	—	1
Result	11	18	—	—	—	—	29
Total elected	12	24	0	—	—	—	36
Net gain/loss	▼9	▲9	—	—	—	—	9
Nationwide vote	19,786,883	23,253,636	698,161	879,722	152,703	394,075	45,165,180
Share	43.81%	51.49%	1.55%	1.95%	0.34%	0.87%	100%
Result	44	54	2	—	—	—	100

Source: Clerk of the U.S. House of Representatives

== Change in composition ==
=== Before the elections ===
D_{1}	D_{2}	D_{3}	D_{4}	D_{5}	D_{6}	D_{7}	D_{8}	D_{9}	D_{10}
D_{20}	D_{19}	D_{18}	D_{17}	D_{16}	D_{15}	D_{14}	D_{13}	D_{12}	D_{11}
D_{21}	D_{22}	D_{23}	D_{24}	D_{25}	D_{26}	D_{27}	D_{28}	D_{29}	D_{30}
D_{40} Mass. Ran	D_{39} La. Ran	D_{38} Ill. Ran	D_{37} Hawaii (sp); Ran	D_{36} Del. Ran	D_{35} Colo. Ran	D_{34} Ark. Ran	D_{33} Alaska; Ran	D_{32}	D_{31}
D_{41} Minn. Ran	D_{42} N.H. Ran	D_{43} N.J. Ran	D_{44} N.M. Ran	D_{45} N.C. Ran	D_{46} Ore. Ran	D_{47} R.I. Ran	D_{48} Va. Ran	D_{49} Iowa; Retired	D_{50} Mich. Retired
Majority→									D_{51} S.D. Retired
R_{41} Texas; Ran	R_{42} Wyo. Ran	R_{43} Okla. (sp); Resigned	R_{44} Ga. Retired	R_{45} Neb. Retired	I_{1}	I_{2}	D_{53} Mont. Withdrew	D_{52} W.Va. Retired	D_{51} S.D. Retired
R_{40} Tenn. Ran	R_{39} S.C. (sp); Ran	R_{38} S.C. (reg); Ran	R_{37} Okla. (reg); Ran	R_{36} Miss. Ran	R_{35} Me. Ran	R_{34} Ky. Ran	R_{33} Kan. Ran	R_{32} Idaho; Ran	R_{31} Ala. Ran
R_{21}	R_{22}	R_{23}	R_{24}	R_{25}	R_{26}	R_{27}	R_{28}	R_{29}	R_{30}
R_{20}	R_{19}	R_{18}	R_{17}	R_{16}	R_{15}	R_{14}	R_{13}	R_{12}	R_{11}
R_{1}	R_{2}	R_{3}	R_{4}	R_{5}	R_{6}	R_{7}	R_{8}	R_{9}	R_{10}

=== After the elections ===
D_{1}	D_{2}	D_{3}	D_{4}	D_{5}	D_{6}	D_{7}	D_{8}	D_{9}	D_{10}
D_{20}	D_{19}	D_{18}	D_{17}	D_{16}	D_{15}	D_{14}	D_{13}	D_{12}	D_{11}
D_{21}	D_{22}	D_{23}	D_{24}	D_{25}	D_{26}	D_{27}	D_{28}	D_{29}	D_{30}
D_{40} N.J. Re-elected	D_{39} N.H. Re-elected	D_{38} Minn. Re-elected	D_{37} Mich. Hold	D_{36} Mass. Re-elected	D_{35} Ill. Re-elected	D_{34} Hawaii (sp); Elected (Note: Appointee elected)	D_{33} Del. Re-elected	D_{32}	D_{31}
D_{41} N.M. Re-elected	D_{42} Ore. Re-elected	D_{43} R.I. Re-elected	D_{44} Va. Re-elected	I_{1}	I_{2}	R_{54} W.Va. Gain	R_{53} S.D. Gain	R_{52} N.C. Gain	R_{51} Mont. Gain
Majority →									R_{51} Mont. Gain
R_{41} S.C. (reg); Re-elected	R_{42} S.C. (sp); Elected	R_{43} Tenn. Re-elected	R_{44} Texas; Re-elected	R_{45} Wyo. Re-elected	R_{46} Alaska; Gain	R_{47} Ark. Gain	R_{48} Colo. Gain	R_{49} Iowa; Gain	R_{50} La. Gain
R_{40} Okla. (sp); Hold	R_{39} Okla. (reg); Re-elected	R_{38} Neb. Hold	R_{37} Miss. Re-elected	R_{36} Me. Re-elected	R_{35} Ky. Re-elected	R_{34} Kan. Re-elected	R_{33} Idaho; Re-elected	R_{32} Ga. Hold	R_{31} Ala. Re-elected
R_{21}	R_{22}	R_{23}	R_{24}	R_{25}	R_{26}	R_{27}	R_{28}	R_{29}	R_{30}
R_{20}	R_{19}	R_{18}	R_{17}	R_{16}	R_{15}	R_{14}	R_{13}	R_{12}	R_{11}
R_{1}	R_{2}	R_{3}	R_{4}	R_{5}	R_{6}	R_{7}	R_{8}	R_{9}	R_{10}

Key:

D_{#}	Democratic
R_{#}	Republican
I_{#}	Independent, caucusing with the Democrats

== Gains and losses ==
=== Retirements ===
Map of retirements: Republican incumbent Democratic incumbent Democratic incumbent retired or withdrew Republican incumbent retired

Four Democrats and two Republicans retired instead of seeking re-election. Max Baucus of Montana announced his intent to retire at the end of his term, but he resigned on February 6, 2014, after being appointed as the United States ambassador to China. John Walsh, who was appointed by Montana Governor Steve Bullock to finish Baucus's term, later withdrew to run for a full term (see Nomination withdrawn section below).

State	Senator	Age at end of term	Assumed office	Replaced by
Georgia	Saxby Chambliss	71	2003	David Perdue
Iowa	Tom Harkin	75	1985	Joni Ernst
Michigan	Carl Levin	76	1979	Gary Peters
Nebraska	Mike Johanns	64	2009	Ben Sasse
South Dakota	Tim Johnson	68	1997	Mike Rounds
West Virginia	Jay Rockefeller	77	1985	Shelley Moore Capito

=== Resignations ===
One Republican resigned four years into his six-year term.

State	Senator	Age of resignation	Assumed office	Replaced by
Oklahoma (special)	Tom Coburn	66	2005	James Lankford

=== Nomination withdrawn ===
One Democrat was originally to seek election for a full six-year term in office, but withdrew.

State	Senator	Age at end of term	Assumed office	Replaced by
Montana	John Walsh	54	2014 (Note: Appointed to the seat following the resignation of Max Baucus.)	Steve Daines

=== Defeats ===
Five Democrats sought re-election but lost in the general election.

State	Senator	Age at end of term	Assumed office	Replaced by
Alaska	Mark Begich	52	2009	Dan Sullivan
Arkansas	Mark Pryor	51	2003	Tom Cotton
Colorado	Mark Udall	64	2009	Cory Gardner
Louisiana	Mary Landrieu	59	1997	Bill Cassidy
North Carolina	Kay Hagan	61	2009	Thom Tillis

== Race summaries ==
=== Special elections during the preceding Congress ===
In these special elections, the winners were elected during 2014 and seated before January 3, 2015 — except that one was seated on January 3, 2015, the effective date of the predecessor's resignation.

State	Incumbent			Results	Candidates
State	Senator	Party	Electoral history	Results	Candidates
Hawaii (Class 3)	Brian Schatz	Democratic	2012 (appointed)	Interim appointee elected.	▌ ✓ Brian Schatz (Democratic) 69.8%; ▌Campbell Cavasso (Republican) 27.7%; ▌Michael A. Kokoski (Libertarian) 2.5%
Oklahoma (Class 3)	Tom Coburn	Republican	2004; 2010	Incumbent resigned, effective January 3, 2015. Republican hold.	▌ ✓ James Lankford (Republican) 67.9%; ▌Connie Johnson (Democratic) 29.0%; ▌Mark T. Beard (Independent) 3.2%
South Carolina (Class 3)	Tim Scott	Republican	2013 (appointed)	Interim appointee elected.	▌ ✓ Tim Scott (Republican) 61.1%; ▌Joyce Dickerson (Democratic) 37.1%; ▌Jill Bossi (American) 1.8%

=== Elections leading to the next Congress ===
In these general elections, the winners were elected for the term beginning January 3, 2015; ordered by state.

All of the elections involved the Class 2 seats.

State	Incumbent			Results	Candidates
State	Senator	Party	Electoral history	Results	Candidates
Alabama	Jeff Sessions	Republican	1996; 2002; 2008	Incumbent re-elected.	▌ ✓ Jeff Sessions (Republican) 97.25%; Write-ins 2.75%
Alaska	Mark Begich	Democratic	2008	Incumbent lost re-election. Republican gain.	▌ ✓ Dan Sullivan (Republican) 48.0%; ▌Mark Begich (Democratic) 45.8%; ▌Mark Fish (Libertarian) 3.7%; ▌Ted Gianoutsos (Independent) 2.0%
Arkansas	Mark Pryor	Democratic	2002; 2008	Incumbent lost re-election. Republican gain.	▌ ✓ Tom Cotton (Republican) 56.5%; ▌Mark Pryor (Democratic) 39.4%; Others: ▌Nathan LaFrance (Libertarian) 2.0%; ▌Mark Swaney (Green) 2.0%
Colorado	Mark Udall	Democratic	2008	Incumbent lost re-election. Republican gain.	▌ ✓ Cory Gardner (Republican) 48.2%; ▌Mark Udall (Democratic) 46.3%; ▌Gaylon Kent (Libertarian) 2.6%; Others: ▌Stephen H. Shogan (Independent) 1.4%; ▌Raúl Acosta (Independent) 1.2%; ▌Bill Hammons (Unity) 0.3%
Delaware	Chris Coons	Democratic	2010 (special)	Incumbent re-elected.	▌ ✓ Chris Coons (Democratic) 55.8%; ▌Kevin L. Wade (Republican) 42.2%; ▌Andrew Groff (Green) 1.9%
Georgia	Saxby Chambliss	Republican	2002; 2008	Incumbent retired. Republican hold.	▌ ✓ David Perdue (Republican) 52.9%; ▌Michelle Nunn (Democratic) 45.2%; ▌Amanda Swafford (Libertarian) 1.9%
Idaho	Jim Risch	Republican	2008	Incumbent re-elected.	▌ ✓ Jim Risch (Republican) 65.3%; ▌Nels Mitchell (Democratic) 34.7%
Illinois	Dick Durbin	Democratic	1996; 2002; 2008	Incumbent re-elected.	▌ ✓ Dick Durbin (Democratic) 53.5%; ▌Jim Oberweis (Republican) 42.7%; ▌Sharon Hansen (Libertarian) 3.8%
Iowa	Tom Harkin	Democratic	1984; 1990; 1996; 2002; 2008	Incumbent retired. New senator elected. Republican gain.	▌ ✓ Joni Ernst (Republican) 52.1%; ▌Bruce Braley (Democratic) 43.8%; Others: ▌Rick Stewart (Independent) 2.4%; ▌Doug Butzier (Libertarian) 0.7%; ▌Bob Quast (Independent) 0.5%; ▌Ruth Smith (Independent) 0.4%
Kansas	Pat Roberts	Republican	1996; 2002; 2008	Incumbent re-elected.	▌ ✓ Pat Roberts (Republican) 53.1%; ▌Greg Orman (Independent) 42.5%; ▌Randall Batson (Libertarian) 4.3%
Kentucky	Mitch McConnell	Republican	1984; 1990; 1996; 2002; 2008	Incumbent re-elected.	▌ ✓ Mitch McConnell (Republican) 56.1%; ▌Alison Lundergan Grimes (Democratic) 40.7%; ▌David Patterson (Libertarian) 3.1%
Louisiana	Mary Landrieu	Democratic	1996; 2002; 2008	Incumbent lost re-election in runoff. Republican gain.	▌ ✓ Bill Cassidy (Republican) 55.9%; ▌Mary Landrieu (Democratic) 44.1%
Maine	Susan Collins	Republican	1996; 2002; 2008	Incumbent re-elected.	▌ ✓ Susan Collins (Republican) 68.5%; ▌Shenna Bellows (Democratic) 31.5%
Massachusetts	Ed Markey	Democratic	2013 (special)	Incumbent re-elected.	▌ ✓ Ed Markey (Democratic) 62.0%; ▌Brian Herr (Republican) 38.0%
Michigan	Carl Levin	Democratic	1978; 1984; 1990; 1996; 2002; 2008	Incumbent retired. Democratic hold.	▌ ✓ Gary Peters (Democratic) 54.6%; ▌Terri Lynn Land (Republican) 41.3%; Others: ▌Jim Fulner (Libertarian) 2.0%; ▌Richard Matkin (U.S. Taxpayers) 1.2%; ▌Chris Wahmhoff (Green) 0.9%
Minnesota	Al Franken	DFL	2008	Incumbent re-elected.	▌ ✓ Al Franken (DFL) 53.2%; ▌Mike McFadden (Republican) 42.9%; Others: ▌Steve Carlson (Independence) 2.4%; ▌Heather Johnson (Libertarian) 1.5%
Mississippi	Thad Cochran	Republican	1978; 1984; 1990; 1996; 2002; 2008	Incumbent re-elected.	▌ ✓ Thad Cochran (Republican) 59.9%; ▌Travis Childers (Democratic) 37.9%; ▌Shawn O'Hara (Reform) 2.2%
Montana	John Walsh	Democratic	2014 (appointed)	Interim appointee nominated but withdrew. Republican gain.	▌ ✓ Steve Daines (Republican) 57.8%; ▌Amanda Curtis (Democratic) 40.1%; ▌Roger Roots (Libertarian) 2.1
Nebraska	Mike Johanns	Republican	2008	Incumbent retired. Republican hold.	▌ ✓ Ben Sasse (Republican) 64.4%; ▌David Domina (Democratic) 31.5%; ▌Jim Jenkins (Independent) 2.9%; ▌Todd Watson (Independent) 1.2%
New Hampshire	Jeanne Shaheen	Democratic	2008	Incumbent re-elected.	▌ ✓ Jeanne Shaheen (Democratic) 51.5%; ▌Scott Brown (Republican) 48.2%
New Jersey	Cory Booker	Democratic	2013 (special)	Incumbent re-elected.	▌ ✓ Cory Booker (Democratic) 55.8%; ▌Jeff Bell (Republican) 42.3%; Others: ▌Joe Baratelli (Libertarian) 0.9%; ▌Hank Schroeder (Economic Growth) 0.3%; ▌Jeff Boss (Independent) 0.2%; ▌Eugene M. LaVergne (Independent) 0.2%; ▌Antonio Sabas (Independent) 0.2%
New Mexico	Tom Udall	Democratic	2008	Incumbent re-elected.	▌ ✓ Tom Udall (Democratic) 55.6%; ▌Allen Weh (Republican) 44.4%
North Carolina	Kay Hagan	Democratic	2008	Incumbent lost re-election. Republican gain.	▌ ✓ Thom Tillis (Republican) 48.8%; ▌Kay Hagan (Democratic) 47.3%; ▌Sean Haugh (Libertarian) 3.7%
Oklahoma	Jim Inhofe	Republican	1994; 1996; 2002; 2008	Incumbent re-elected.	▌ ✓ Jim Inhofe (Republican) 68.0%; ▌Matt Silverstein (Democratic) 28.6%; Others: ▌Joan Farr (Independent) 1.3%; ▌Ray Woods (Independent) 1.2%; ▌Aaron DeLozier (Independent) 0.9%
Oregon	Jeff Merkley	Democratic	2008	Incumbent re-elected.	▌ ✓ Jeff Merkley (Democratic) 55.7%; ▌Monica Wehby (Republican) 36.9%; ▌Mike Montchalin (Libertarian) 3.1%; Others: ▌Christina Jean Lugo (Pacific Green) 2.2%; ▌James E. Leuenberger (Constitution) 1.7%
Rhode Island	Jack Reed	Democratic	1996; 2002; 2008	Incumbent re-elected.	▌ ✓ Jack Reed (Democratic) 70.6%; ▌Mark Zaccaria (Republican) 29.2%
South Carolina	Lindsey Graham	Republican	2002; 2008	Incumbent re-elected.	▌ ✓ Lindsey Graham (Republican) 54.3%; ▌Brad Hutto (Democratic) 38.8%; ▌Thomas Ravenel (Independent) 3.8%; ▌Victor Kocher (Libertarian) 2.7%
South Dakota	Tim Johnson	Democratic	1996; 2002; 2008	Incumbent retired. Republican gain.	▌ ✓ Mike Rounds (Republican) 50.4%; ▌Rick Weiland (Democratic) 29.5%; ▌Larry Pressler (Independent) 17.1%; ▌Gordon Howie (Independent) 3.0%
Tennessee	Lamar Alexander	Republican	2002; 2008	Incumbent re-elected.	▌ ✓ Lamar Alexander (Republican) 61.9%; ▌Gordon Ball (Democratic) 31.9%; ▌Joe B. Wilmoth (Constitution) 2.6%; Others: ▌Martin Pleasant (Green) 0.9%; ▌Tom Emerson Jr. (Independent) 0.8%; ▌Danny Page (Independent) 0.6%; ▌Rick Tyler (Independent) 0.4%; ▌Joshua James (Independent) 0.4%; ▌Bartholomew J. Phillips (Independent) 0.2%; ▌Edmund L. Gauthier (Independent) 0.2%; ▌Eric Schechter (Independent) 0.1%; ▌Choudhury Salekin (Independent) 0.1%
Texas	John Cornyn	Republican	2002; 2002 (appointed); 2008	Incumbent re-elected.	▌ ✓ John Cornyn (Republican) 61.6%; ▌David Alameel (Democratic) 34.4%; ▌Rebecca Paddock (Libertarian) 2.9%; ▌Emily Marie Sanchez (Green) 1.2%
Virginia	Mark Warner	Democratic	2008	Incumbent re-elected.	▌ ✓ Mark Warner (Democratic) 49.1%; ▌Ed Gillespie (Republican) 48.3%; ▌Robert Sarvis (Libertarian) 2.4%
West Virginia	Jay Rockefeller	Democratic	1984; 1990; 1996; 2002; 2008	Incumbent retired. Republican gain.	▌ ✓ Shelley Moore Capito (Republican) 62.1%; ▌Natalie Tennant (Democratic) 34.5%; Others: ▌John S. Buckley (Libertarian) 1.6%; ▌Bob Henry Baber (Mountain) 1.2%; ▌Phil Hudok (Constitution) 0.6%
Wyoming	Mike Enzi	Republican	1996; 2002; 2008	Incumbent re-elected.	▌ ✓ Mike Enzi (Republican) 71.2%; ▌Charlie Hardy (Democratic) 17.4%; ▌Curt Gottshall (Independent) 7.9%; ▌Joe Porambo (Libertarian) 2.2%

== Closest races ==
In seven races the margin of victory was under 10%.

District	Winner	Margin
Virginia	Democratic	0.8%
North Carolina	Republican (flip)	1.5%
Colorado	Republican (flip)	1.9%
Alaska	Republican (flip)	2.2%
New Hampshire	Democratic	3.3%
Georgia	Republican	7.7% (Note: Georgia was the "tipping point" state.)
Iowa	Republican (flip)	8.3%

== Final pre-election predictions ==
Consensus predictions for the races: Safe Democratic seat Competitive Democratic-held seat Safe Republican seat Competitive Republican-held seat

=== Predicted probability of Republican takeover ===
Several websites used poll aggregation and psephology to estimate the probability that the Republican Party would gain enough seats to take control of the Senate.

Source	Probability of Republican control	Updated
FiveThirtyEight	76.2%	Nov 4
Princeton Election Consortium (Sam Wang)	65%	Nov 3
Huffington Post	79%	Nov 3
The Upshot (The New York Times)	70%	Nov 3
The Washington Post	97%	Nov 3
Daily Kos	90%	Nov 4

=== Predictions ===
Republicans needed to win at least six in order to gain a majority of 51 seats and Democrats needed to win at least seven in order to hold a majority of 50 seats (including the two independents who currently caucus with the Democrats) and the tie-breaking vote of Vice President Joe Biden.

State	PVI	Incumbent	Last election (Note: The last elections for this group of senators were in 2008, except for those elected in a special election or who were appointed after the resignation or passing of a sitting senator, as noted.)	Cook Oct. 29, 2014	Daily Kos Nov. 3, 2014	538 Oct. 29, 2014	NYT Oct. 29, 2014	RCP Oct. 29, 2014	Rothenberg Oct. 29, 2014	Sabato Oct. 29, 2014	Jay DeSart Oct. 28, 2014	Winner
Alabama	R+14	Jeff Sessions	63.4%	Safe R	Safe R	Safe R	Safe R	Safe R	Safe R	Safe R	Safe R	Sessions (97.3%)
Alaska	R+12	Mark Begich	47.8%	Tossup	Likely R (flip)	Lean R (flip)	Lean R (flip)	Tossup	Tilt R (flip)	Lean R (flip)	Lean R (flip)	Sullivan (48.0%) (flip)
Arkansas	R+14	Mark Pryor	79.5%	Tossup	Safe R (flip)	Safe R (flip)	Likely R (flip)	Lean R (flip)	Lean R (flip)	Likely R (flip)	Lean R (flip)	Cotton (56.5%) (flip)
Colorado	D+1	Mark Udall	52.8%	Tossup	Likely R (flip)	Likely R (flip)	Likely R (flip)	Tossup	Tilt R (flip)	Lean R (flip)	Lean R (flip)	Gardner (48.2%) (flip)
Delaware	D+8	Chris Coons	56.6% (2010 sp.) (Note: Democrat Joe Biden won in 2008 with 64.7% of the vote, but resigned on January 15, 2009, to become the vice president of the United States.)	Safe D	Safe D	Safe D	Safe D	Safe D	Safe D	Safe D	Safe D	Coons (55.8%)
Georgia	R+6	Saxby Chambliss (retiring)	57.4%	Tossup	Safe R	Likely R	Lean R	Tossup	Tossup	Lean R	Lean R	Perdue (52.9%)
Hawaii (special)	D+20	Brian Schatz	Appointed (2012) (Note: Democrat Daniel Inouye won in 2010 with 74.8% of the vote, but died on December 17, 2012.)	Safe D	Safe D	Safe D	Safe D	Safe D	Safe D	Safe D	Safe D	Schatz (69.8%)
Idaho	R+18	Jim Risch	57.7%	Safe R	Safe R	Safe R	Safe R	Safe R	Safe R	Safe R	Safe R	Risch (65.3%)
Illinois	D+8	Dick Durbin	67.8%	Safe D	Safe D	Safe D	Safe D	Likely D	Safe D	Safe D	Safe D	Durbin (53.5%)
Iowa	D+1	Tom Harkin (retiring)	62.7%	Tossup	Likely R (flip)	Likely R (flip)	Lean R (flip)	Tossup	Tossup	Lean R (flip)	Lean R (flip)	Ernst (52.1%) (flip)
Kansas	R+12	Pat Roberts	60.1%	Tossup	Safe R	Lean I (flip)	Tossup	Tossup	Tossup	Lean R	Tossup	Roberts (53.1%)
Kentucky	R+13	Mitch McConnell	53.0%	Lean R	Safe R	Safe R	Safe R	Lean R	Likely R	Likely R	Likely R	McConnell (56.2%)
Louisiana	R+12	Mary Landrieu	52.1%	Lean R (flip)	Likely R (flip)	Likely R (flip)	Likely R (flip)	Likely R (flip)	Lean R (flip)	Safe R (flip)	Likely R (flip)	Cassidy (55.9%) (flip)
Maine	D+6	Susan Collins	61.3%	Safe R	Safe R	Safe R	Safe R	Safe R	Safe R	Safe R	Safe R	Collins (68.5%)
Massachusetts	D+10	Ed Markey	54.8% (2013 sp.) (Note: Democrat John Kerry won in 2008 with 65.9% of the vote, but resigned on February 1, 2013, to become the United States Secretary of State.)	Safe D	Safe D	Safe D	Safe D	Safe D	Safe D	Safe D	Safe D	Markey (61.9%)
Michigan	D+4	Carl Levin (retiring)	62.7%	Lean D	Safe D	Safe D	Safe D	Safe D	Likely D	Likely D	Safe D	Peters (54.6%)
Minnesota	D+2	Al Franken	41.99%	Likely D	Safe D	Safe D	Safe D	Likely D	Likely D	Likely D	Safe D	Franken (53.2%)
Mississippi	R+9	Thad Cochran	61.4%	Likely R	Safe R	Safe R	Safe R	Likely R	Safe R	Safe R	Safe R	Cochran (59.9%)
Montana	R+7	John Walsh (withdrew)	Appointed (2014) (Note: Democrat Max Baucus won in 2008 with 72.9% of the vote, but resigned on February 6, 2014, to become United States Ambassador to China.)	Safe R (flip)	Safe R (flip)	Safe R (flip)	Safe R (flip)	Safe R (flip)	Safe R (flip)	Safe R (flip)	Safe R (flip)	Daines (57.8%) (flip)
Nebraska	R+12	Mike Johanns (retiring)	57.5%	Safe R	Safe R	Safe R	Safe R	Safe R	Safe R	Safe R	Safe R	Sasse (64.5%)
New Hampshire	D+1	Jeanne Shaheen	51.6%	Tossup	Tilt D	Likely D	Lean D	Tossup	Tilt D	Lean D	Tilt D	Shaheen (51.6%)
New Jersey	D+6	Cory Booker	54.9% (2013 sp.) (Note: Democrat Frank Lautenberg won in 2008 with 56.0% of the vote, but died on June 3, 2013.)	Safe D	Safe D	Safe D	Safe D	Likely D	Safe D	Safe D	Safe D	Booker (55.8%)
New Mexico	D+4	Tom Udall	61.3%	Safe D	Safe D	Safe D	Safe D	Likely D	Safe D	Safe D	Safe D	T. Udall (55.6%)
North Carolina	R+3	Kay Hagan	52.7%	Tossup	Tossup	Lean D	Lean D	Tossup	Tossup	Lean D	Tossup	Tillis (48.8%) (flip)
Oklahoma (regular)	R+19	Jim Inhofe	56.7%	Safe R	Safe R	Safe R	Safe R	Safe R	Safe R	Safe R	Safe R	Inhofe (68.0%)
Oklahoma (special)	R+19	Tom Coburn (retiring)	70.6% (2010)	Safe R	Safe R	Safe R	Safe R	Safe R	Safe R	Safe R	Safe R	Lankford (67.9%)
Oregon	D+5	Jeff Merkley	48.9%	Likely D	Safe D	Safe D	Safe D	Likely D	Likely D	Likely D	Safe D	Merkley (55.7%)
Rhode Island	D+11	Jack Reed	73.4%	Safe D	Safe D	Safe D	Safe D	Safe D	Safe D	Safe D	Safe D	Reed (70.6%)
South Carolina (regular)	R+8	Lindsey Graham	57.5%	Safe R	Safe R	Safe R	Safe R	Safe R	Safe R	Safe R	Safe R	Graham (55.3%)
South Carolina special)	R+8	Tim Scott	Appointed (2013) (Note: Republican Jim DeMint won in 2010 with 61.5% of the vote, but resigned on January 1, 2013, to become the president of The Heritage Foundation.)	Safe R	Safe R	Safe R	Safe R	Safe R	Safe R	Safe R	Safe R	Scott (61.1%)
South Dakota	R+10	Tim Johnson (retiring)	62.5%	Lean R (flip)	Likely R (flip)	Safe R (flip)	Safe R (flip)	Likely R (flip)	Likely R (flip)	Likely R (flip)	Safe R (flip)	Rounds (50.4%) (flip)
Tennessee	R+12	Lamar Alexander	65.14%	Safe R	Safe R	SafeR	Safe R	Safe R	Safe R	Safe R	Safe R	Alexander (61.9%)
Texas	R+10	John Cornyn	54.8%	Safe R	Safe R	Safe R	Safe R	Safe R	Safe R	Safe R	Safe R	Cornyn (61.6%)
Virginia	EVEN	Mark Warner	65.0%	Likely D	Safe D	Safe D	Safe D	Lean D	Likely D	Likely D	Likely D	Warner (49.1%)
West Virginia	R+13	Jay Rockefeller (retiring)	63.7%	Likely R (flip)	Safe R (flip)	Safe R (flip)	Safe R (flip)	Likely R (flip)	Safe R (flip)	Safe R (flip)	Safe R (flip)	Capito (62.1%) (flip)
Wyoming	R+22	Mike Enzi	75.6%	Safe R	Safe R	Safe R	Safe R	Safe R	Safe R	Safe R	Safe R	Enzi (72.2%)

== Alabama ==
Alabama election
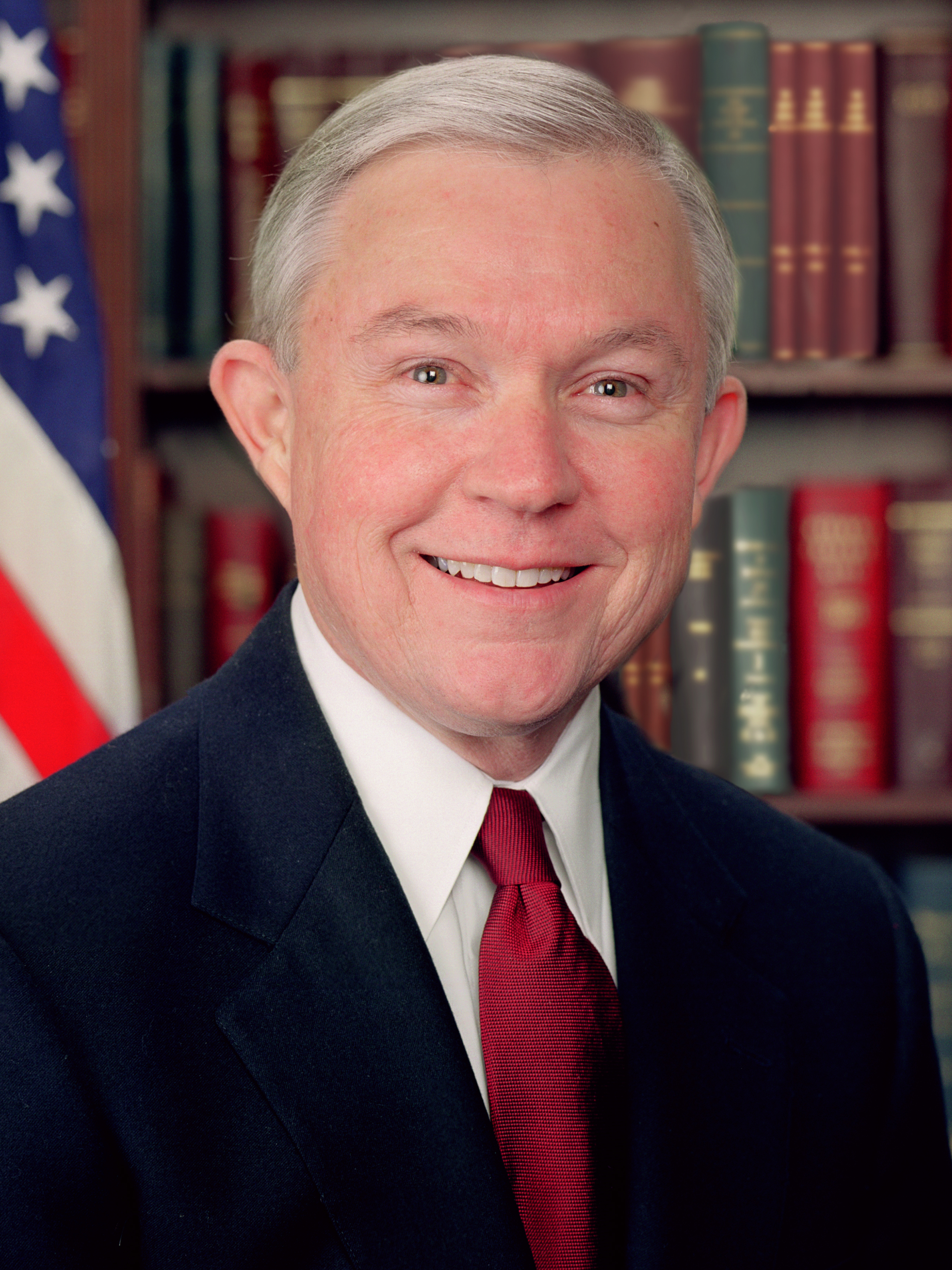
Nominee	Jeff Sessions
Party	Republican
Popular vote	795,606
Percentage	97.3%
- County results Sessions: 80–90% 90–100%
U.S. senator before election
Jeff Sessions
Republican
Elected U.S. Senator
Jeff Sessions
Republican

Three-term incumbent Republican Jeff Sessions had been re-elected with 63% of the vote in 2008. Sessions sought re-election. Democrat Victor Sanchez Williams ran against Sessions as a write-in candidate. Sessions won with 97.3 percent of the vote against assorted write-in candidates.

2014 United States Senate election in Alabama
Party	Candidate	Votes	%
Republican	Jeff Sessions (incumbent)	795,606	97.25%
Write-In	Write-in	22,484	2.75%
Total votes		818,090	100.00%
Republican hold			

== Alaska ==
Alaska election
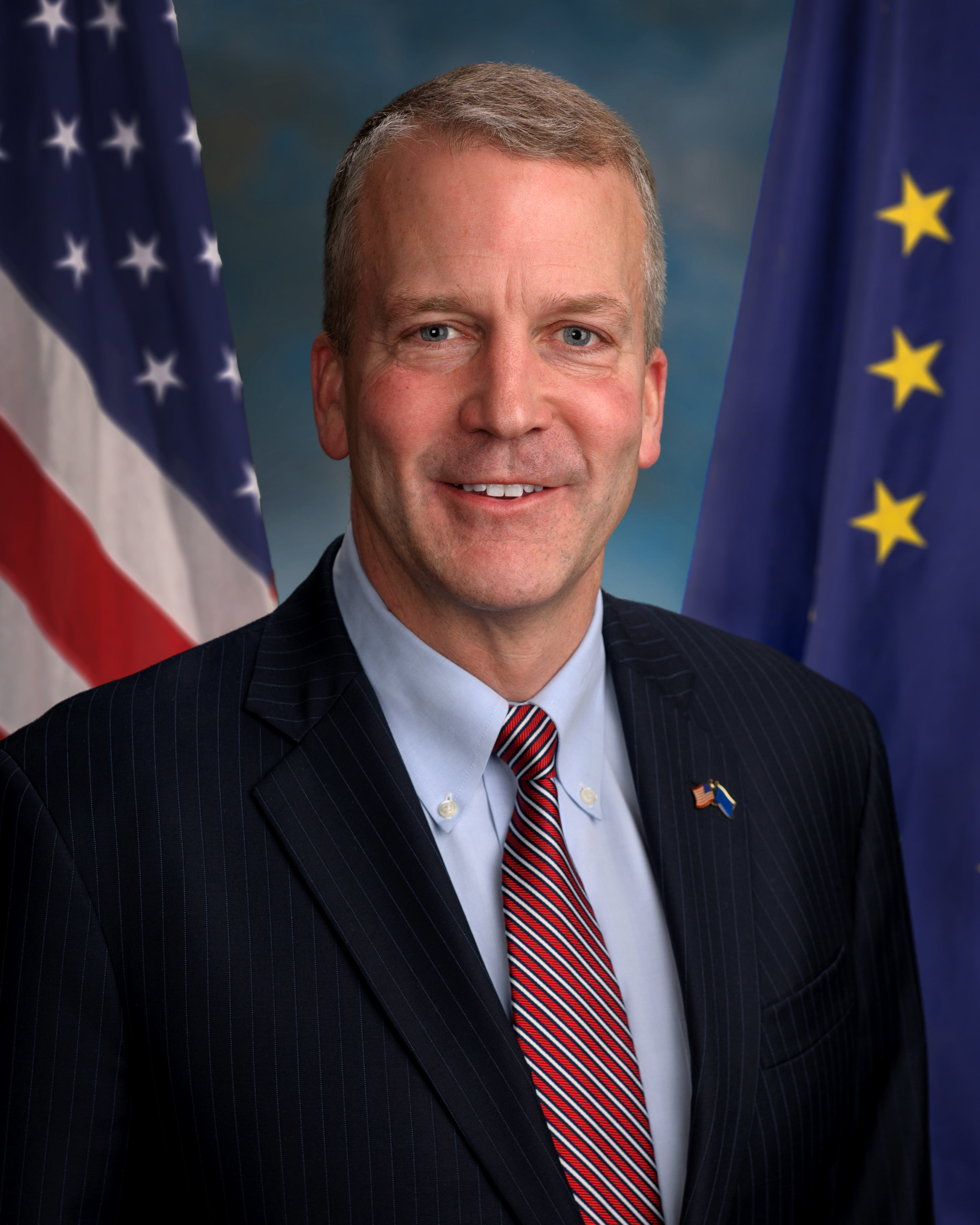

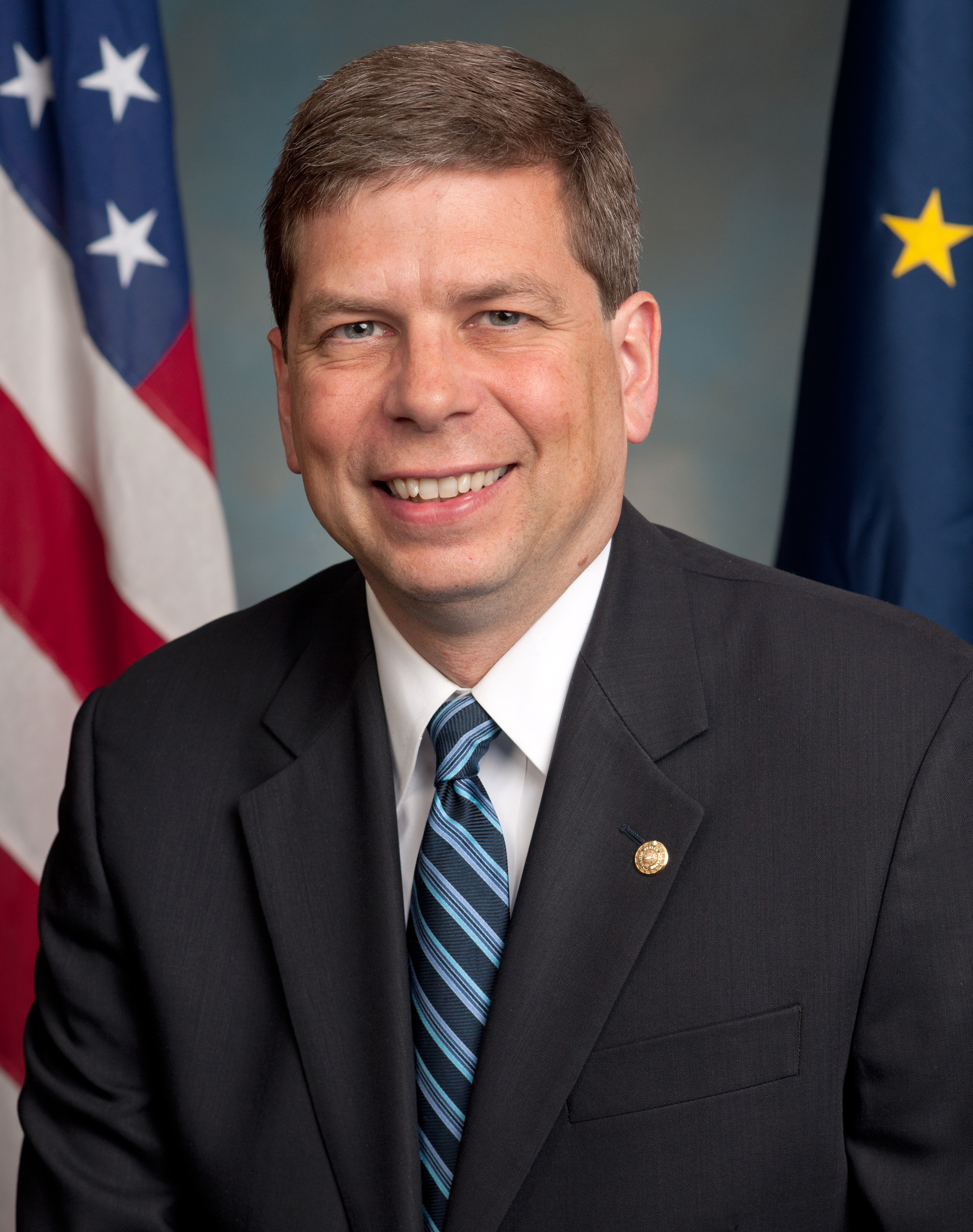
Nominee	Dan Sullivan	Mark Begich
Party	Republican	Democratic
Popular vote	135,445	129,431
Percentage	48.0%	45.8%
- Sullivan: 40–50% 50–60% 60–70% Begich: 40–50% 50–60% 60–70% 70–80%
U.S. senator before election
Mark Begich
Democratic
Elected U.S. Senator
Dan Sullivan
Republican

One-term incumbent Democrat Mark Begich had been first elected with 48% of the vote in 2008, defeating six-term Senator Ted Stevens by 3,953 votes (a margin of 1.25%). Begich was 52 years old in 2014 and was seeking re-election to a second term. Stevens, who would have been almost 91 years old at the time of the election, had already filed for a rematch back in 2009, but was killed in a plane crash the following year.

Republican Lieutenant Governor Mead Treadwell, 2010 nominee Joe Miller, State Natural Resources Commissioner Daniel S. Sullivan, and Air Force veteran John Jaramillo ran for the GOP nomination. In the August 19 primary, Sullivan won the Republican nomination with 40% and defeated Begich in the general election.

== Arkansas ==
Arkansas election
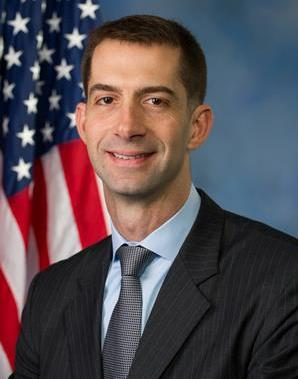

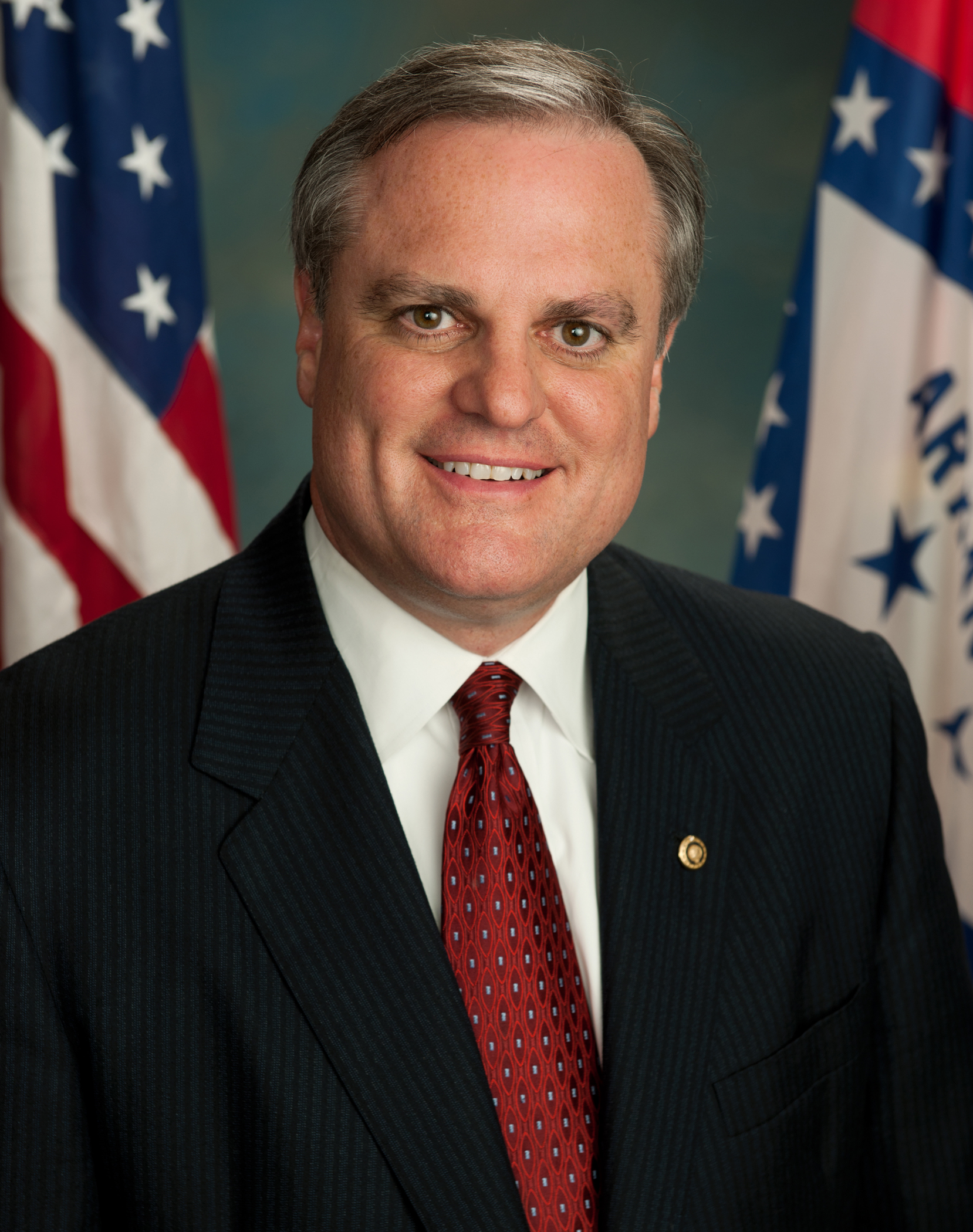
Nominee	Tom Cotton	Mark Pryor
Party	Republican	Democratic
Popular vote	478,819	334,174
Percentage	56.5%	39.4%
- County results Cotton: 40–50% 50–60% 60–70% 70–80% Pryor: 50–60% 60–70%
U.S. senator before election
Mark Pryor
Democratic
Elected U.S. Senator
Tom Cotton
Republican

Two-term incumbent Democrat Mark Pryor had been re-elected with 80% of the vote without Republican opposition in 2008. Pryor was running for a third term.

Freshman Representative Tom Cotton of Arkansas's 4th congressional district was the Republican nominee. In the general election, Cotton defeated Pryor.

Arkansas general election
Party	Candidate	Votes	%
Republican	Tom Cotton	478,819	56.50%
Democratic	Mark Pryor (incumbent)	334,174	39.43%
Libertarian	Nathan LaFrance	17,210	2.03%
Green	Mark Swaney	16,797	1.98%
Write-ins	Others	505	0.06%
Majority		144,645	17.07%
Total votes		847,505	100.00%
Republican gain from Democratic			

== Colorado ==
Colorado election
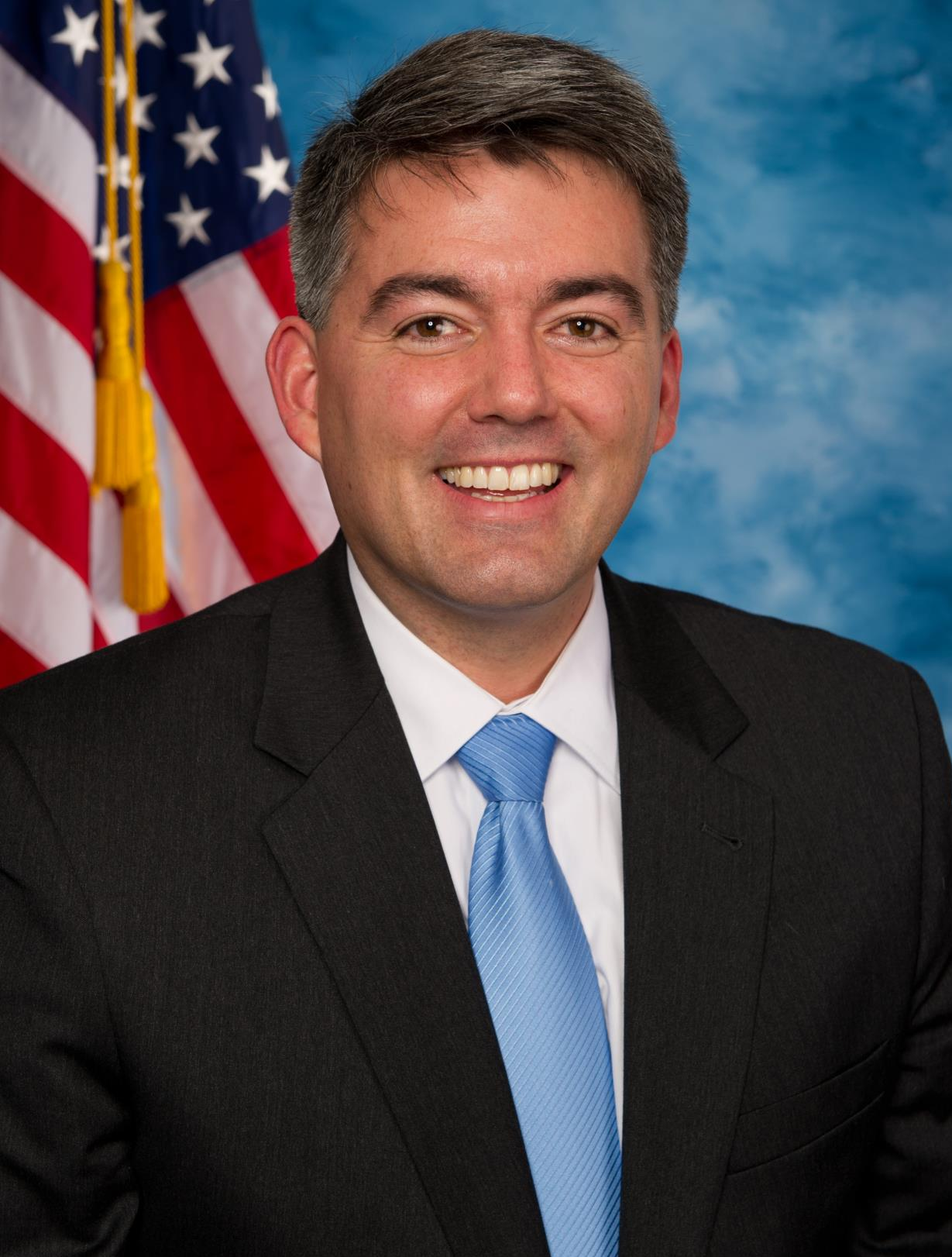

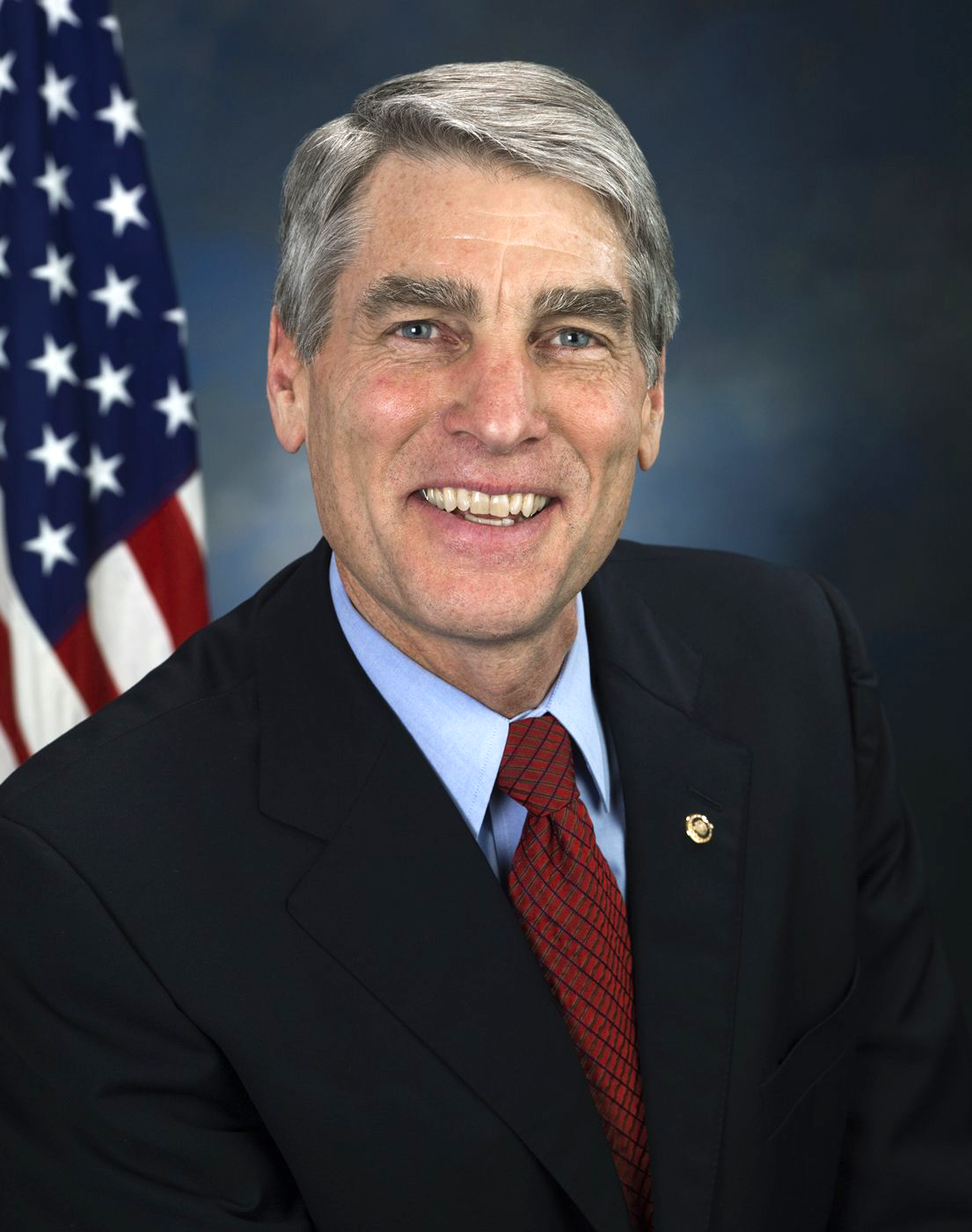
Nominee	Cory Gardner	Mark Udall
Party	Republican	Democratic
Popular vote	983,891	944,203
Percentage	48.2%	46.3%
- Gardner: 40–50% 50–60% 60–70% 70–80% 80–90% Udall: 40–50% 50–60% 60–70% 70–80%
U.S. senator before election
Mark Udall
Democratic
Elected U.S. Senator
Cory Gardner
Republican

One-term incumbent Democrat Mark Udall had been elected with 53% of the vote in 2008. Udall was running for re-election.

Congressman Cory Gardner of Colorado's 4th congressional district was the Republican nominee; his late entry into the race caused numerous Republicans to withdraw their candidacies. Gaylon Kent was the Libertarian Party nominee. Unity Party of America founder and National Chairman Bill Hammons was the Unity Party nominee.

Colorado Democratic primary election
Party	Candidate	Votes	%
Democratic	Mark Udall (incumbent)	213,746	100.00%
Total votes		213,746	100.00%

Colorado Republican primary election
Party	Candidate	Votes	%
Republican	Cory Gardner	338,324	100.00%
Total votes		338,324	100.00%

Colorado general election
Party	Candidate	Votes	%
Republican	Cory Gardner	983,891	48.21%
Democratic	Mark Udall (incumbent)	944,203	46.26%
Libertarian	Gaylon Kent	52,876	2.59%
Independent	Steve Shogan	29,472	1.44%
Independent	Raúl Acosta	24,151	1.18%
Unity	Bill Hammons	6,427	0.32%
Total votes		2,041,020	100.00%
Republican gain from Democratic			

== Delaware ==
Delaware election
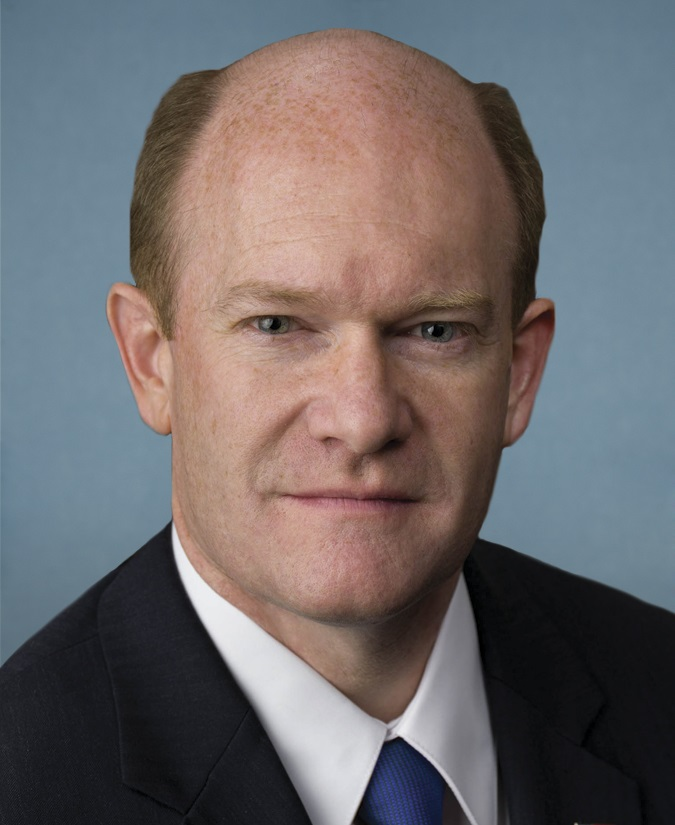

Nominee	Chris Coons	Kevin Wade
Party	Democratic	Republican
Popular vote	130,655	98,823
Percentage	55.8%	42.2%
- County results Coons: 60–70% Wade: 40–50% 50–60%
U.S. senator before election
Chris Coons
Democratic
Elected U.S. Senator
Chris Coons
Democratic

Democrat Chris Coons won in the 2010 United States Senate special election in Delaware caused by Joe Biden's election as vice president, winning by a 57% to 41% margin. Coons sought re-election. His Republican opponent was engineer Kevin Wade, whom Coons went on to defeat in the general election.

Delaware Republican primary election
Party	Candidate	Votes	%
Republican	Kevin Wade	18,181	75.66%
Republican	Carl Smink	5,848	24.34%
Total votes		24,029	100.00%

Delaware general election
Party	Candidate	Votes	%
Democratic	Chris Coons (incumbent)	130,655	55.83%
Republican	Kevin Wade	98,823	42.23%
Green	Andrew Groff	4,560	1.95%
Total votes		234,038	100.00%
Democratic hold			

== Georgia ==
Georgia election
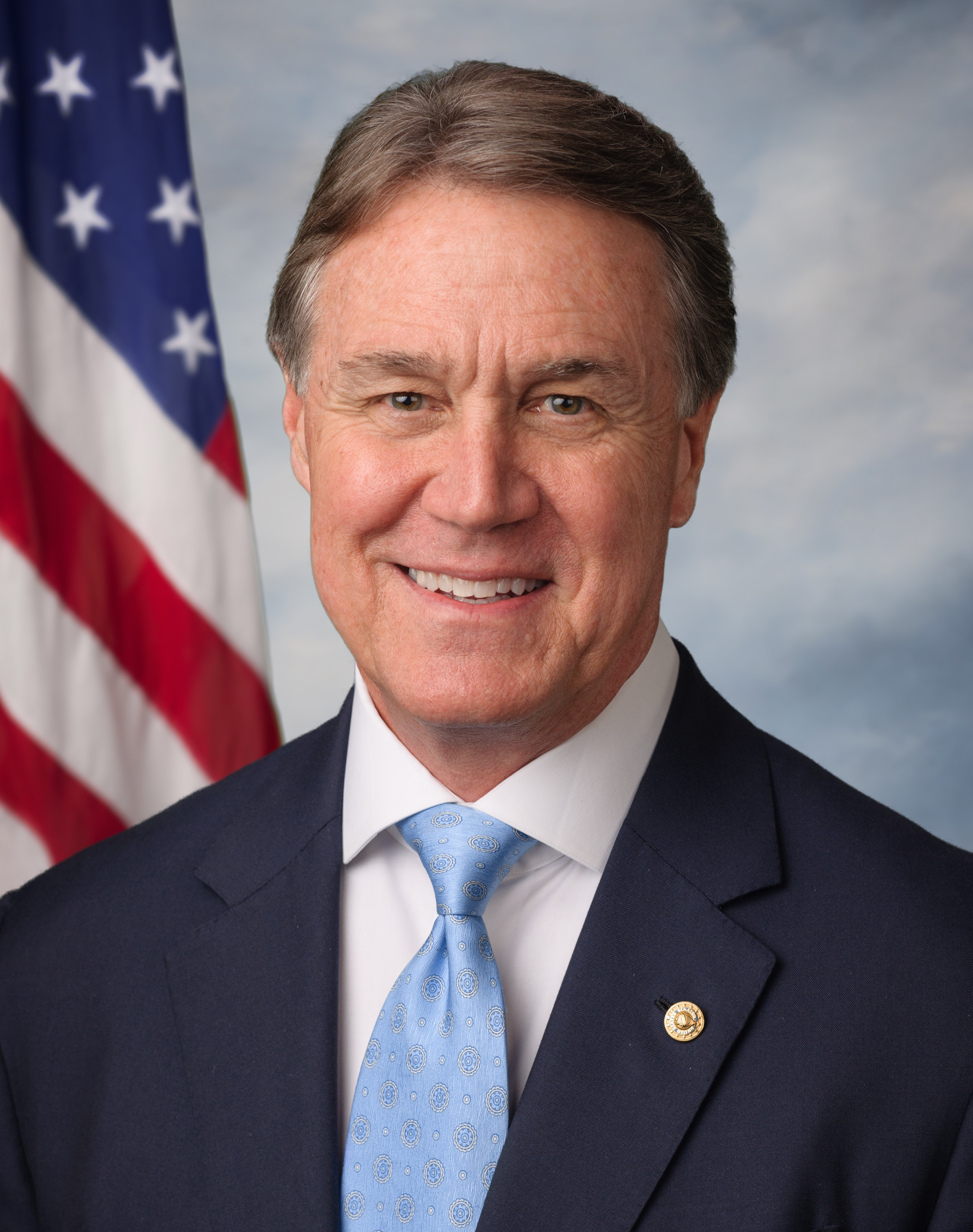

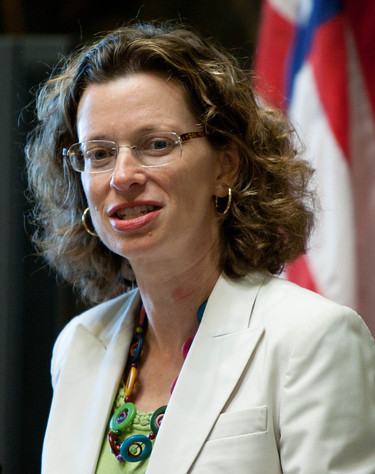
Nominee	David Perdue	Michelle Nunn
Party	Republican	Democratic
Popular vote	1,358,088	1,160,811
Percentage	52.9%	45.2%
- Perdue: 40–50% 50–60% 60–70% 70–80% 80–90% Nunn: 40–50% 50–60% 60–70% 70–80% 80–90%
U.S. senator before election
Saxby Chambliss
Republican
Elected U.S. Senator
David Perdue
Republican

Two-term incumbent Republican Saxby Chambliss had been re-elected with 57% of the vote in 2008 in a runoff election with former state Representative Jim Martin; Georgia requires runoff elections when no Senate candidate wins over 50% of the vote. Chambliss did not seek a third term.

Political activist Derrick Grayson, Representatives Jack Kingston of Georgia's 1st congressional district, Paul Broun of Georgia's 10th congressional district, and Phil Gingrey of Georgia's 11th congressional district all declared their candidacy for the Republican nomination, as did former secretary of state Karen Handel. In the May 20 primary, no candidate received a majority of votes, so the top two candidates faced each other in a runoff; Perdue narrowly won against Kingston in the runoff primary election on July 22 with 50.9% of the vote.

Michelle Nunn, CEO of Points of Light and the daughter of former U.S. Senator Sam Nunn, won the Democratic nomination. Other declared Democratic candidates included former state senator Steen Miles, psychiatrist Branko Radulovacki, and former US Army Ranger Todd Robinson. Amanda Swafford, a former Flowery Branch, Georgia, city councilwoman, received the Libertarian Party of Georgia nomination.

Georgia Republican primary election
Party	Candidate	Votes	%
Republican	David Perdue	185,466	30.64%
Republican	Jack Kingston	156,157	25.80%
Republican	Karen Handel	132,944	21.96%
Republican	Phil Gingrey	60,735	10.03%
Republican	Paul Broun	58,297	9.63%
Republican	Derrick Grayson	6,045	1.00%
Republican	Art Gardner	5,711	0.94%
Total votes		605,355	100.00%

Republican primary runoff
Party	Candidate	Votes	%
Republican	David Perdue	245,951	50.88%
Republican	Jack Kingston	237,448	49.12%
Total votes		483,399	100.00%

Georgia Democratic primary election
Party	Candidate	Votes	%
Democratic	Michelle Nunn	246,369	74.95%
Democratic	Steen Miles	39,418	11.99%
Democratic	Todd Robinson	31,822	9.68%
Democratic	Branko Radulovacki	11,101	3.38%
Total votes		328,710	100.00%

Georgia general election
Party	Candidate	Votes	%
Republican	David Perdue	1,358,088	52.9%
Democratic	Michelle Nunn	1,160,811	45.2%
Libertarian	Amanda Swafford	48,862	1.9%
Total votes		2,567,761	100.0%
Republican hold			

== Hawaii (special) ==
Hawaii special election
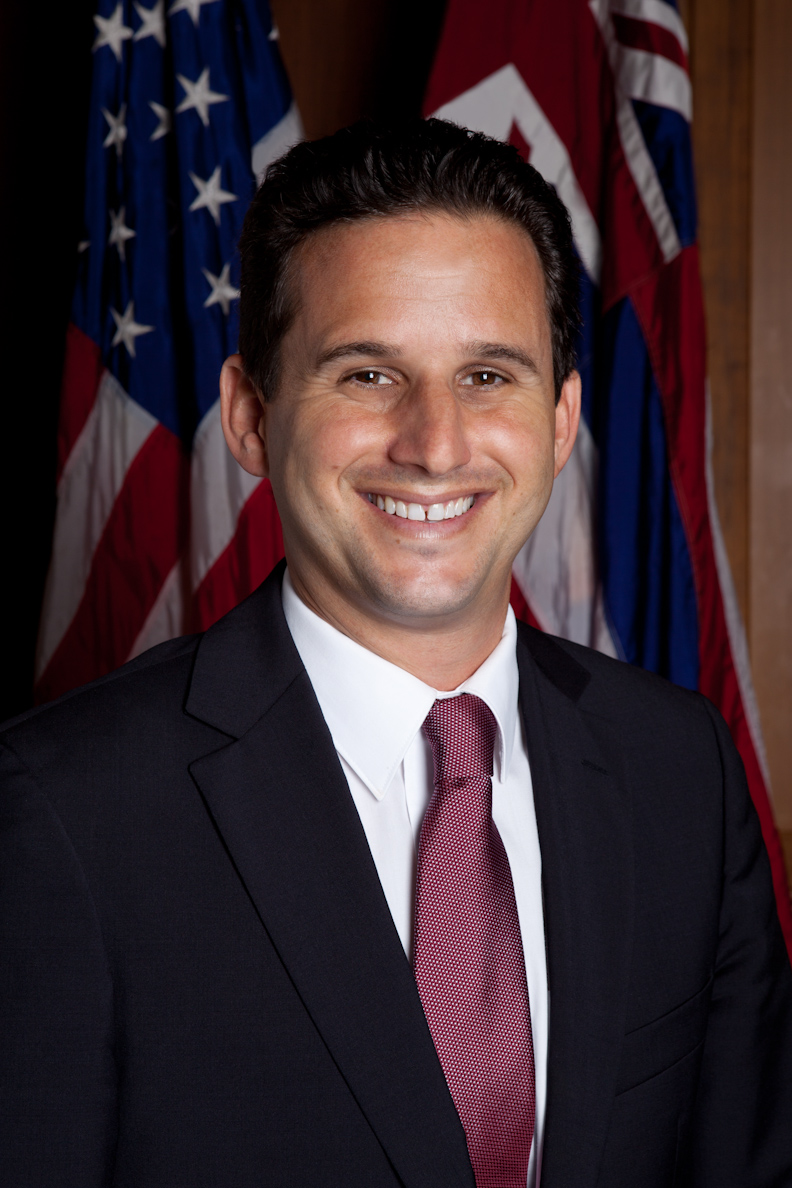

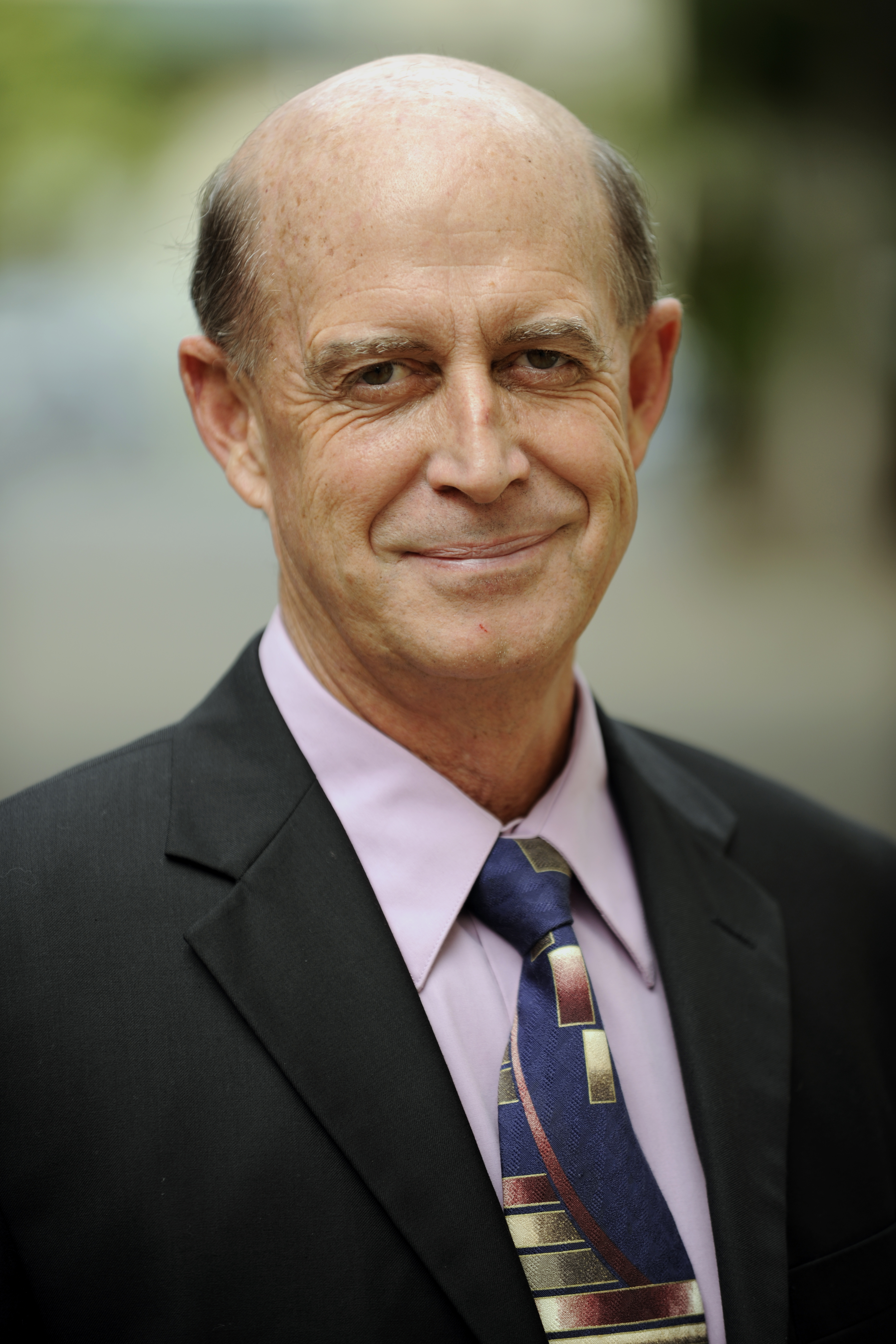
Nominee	Brian Schatz	Campbell Cavasso
Party	Democratic	Republican
Popular vote	246,827	98,006
Percentage	69.8%	27.8%
- County results Schatz: 60–70% 70–80%
U.S. senator before election
Brian Schatz
Democratic
Elected U.S. Senator
Brian Schatz
Democratic

Daniel Inouye, the second longest serving United States senator in U.S. history, died on December 17, 2012, after respiratory complications. Hawaii law allows the governor of Hawaii to appoint an interim senator "who serves until the next regularly-scheduled general election, chosen from a list of three prospective appointees that the prior incumbent's political party submits". Governor Neil Abercrombie did so, selecting Lieutenant Governor Brian Schatz to fill the Senate seat. Inouye had been re-elected in 2010 with 72% of the vote. Schatz was challenged in the Democratic primary by Congresswoman Colleen Hanabusa of Hawaii's 1st congressional district, who Inouye had hoped would be his successor. Schatz defeated Hanabusa in the primary with 48.5% to 47.8%.

Campbell Cavasso, former state representative and nominee for the U.S. Senate in 2004 and 2010, was the Republican nominee.

Hawaii Democratic primary election
Party	Candidate	Votes	%
Democratic	Brian Schatz (incumbent)	115,445	48.5%
Democratic	Colleen Hanabusa	113,663	47.7%
Democratic	Brian Evans	4,842	2.0%
Democratic	Blank vote	3,842	1.6%
Democratic	Over vote	150	0.2%
Total votes		237,942	100.0%

Hawaii Republican primary election
Party	Candidate	Votes	%
Republican	Campbell Cavasso	25,874	59.00%
Republican	John P. Roco	4,425	10.00%
Republican	Harry J. Friel, Jr.	3,477	8.00%
Republican	Eddie Pirkowski	2,033	5.00%
Republican	Blank vote	8,306	18.00%
Republican	Over vote	34	0.08%
Total votes		44,149	100.00%

Hawaii Libertarian primary election
Party	Candidate	Votes	%
Libertarian	Michael Kokoski	568	79.89%
Libertarian	Blank vote	143	20.11%
Total votes		711	100.00%

Hawaii Independent primary election
Party	Candidate	Votes	%
Independent	Joy Allison	388	34.8%
Independent	Arturo Pacheco Reyes	184	16.5%
Independent	Blank vote	540	48.4%
Independent	Over vote	3	0.3%
Total votes		1,115	100.0%

Hawaii special election
Party	Candidate	Votes	%
Democratic	Brian Schatz (incumbent)	246,827	69.8%
Republican	Campbell Cavasso	98,006	27.7%
Libertarian	Michael Kokoski	8,941	2.5%
Total votes		353,774	100.0%

== Idaho ==
Idaho election
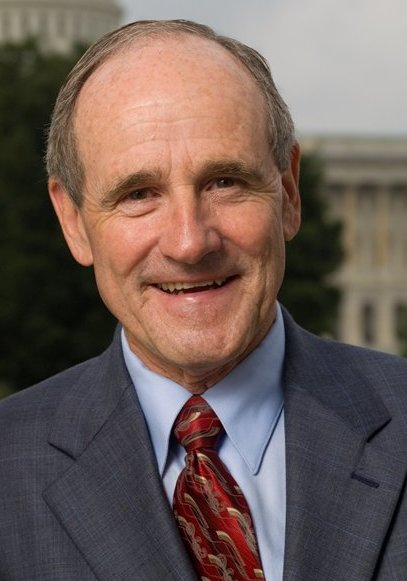

Nominee	Jim Risch	Nels Mitchell
Party	Republican	Democratic
Popular vote	285,596	151,574
Percentage	65.3%	34.7%
- County results Risch: 50–60% 60–70% 70–80% 80–90% Mitchell: 50–60%
U.S. senator before election
Jim Risch
Republican
Elected U.S. Senator
Jim Risch
Republican

One-term incumbent Republican Jim Risch had been elected with 58% of the vote in 2008. Risch sought a second term.

Boise attorney Nels Mitchell was the Democratic nominee.

Idaho Republican primary election
Party	Candidate	Votes	%
Republican	Jim Risch (incumbent)	118,927	79.91%
Republican	Jeremy Anderson	29,897	20.09%
Total votes		148,824	100.00%

Idaho Democratic primary election
Party	Candidate	Votes	%
Democratic	Nels Mitchell	16,905	69.6%
Democratic	William Bryk	7,383	30.4%
Total votes		24,288	100.0%

Idaho general election
Party	Candidate	Votes	%
Republican	Jim Risch (incumbent)	285,596	65.33%
Democratic	Nels Mitchell	151,574	34.67%
Majority		134,022	30.66%
Total votes		437,170	100.00%
Republican hold			

== Illinois ==
Illinois election
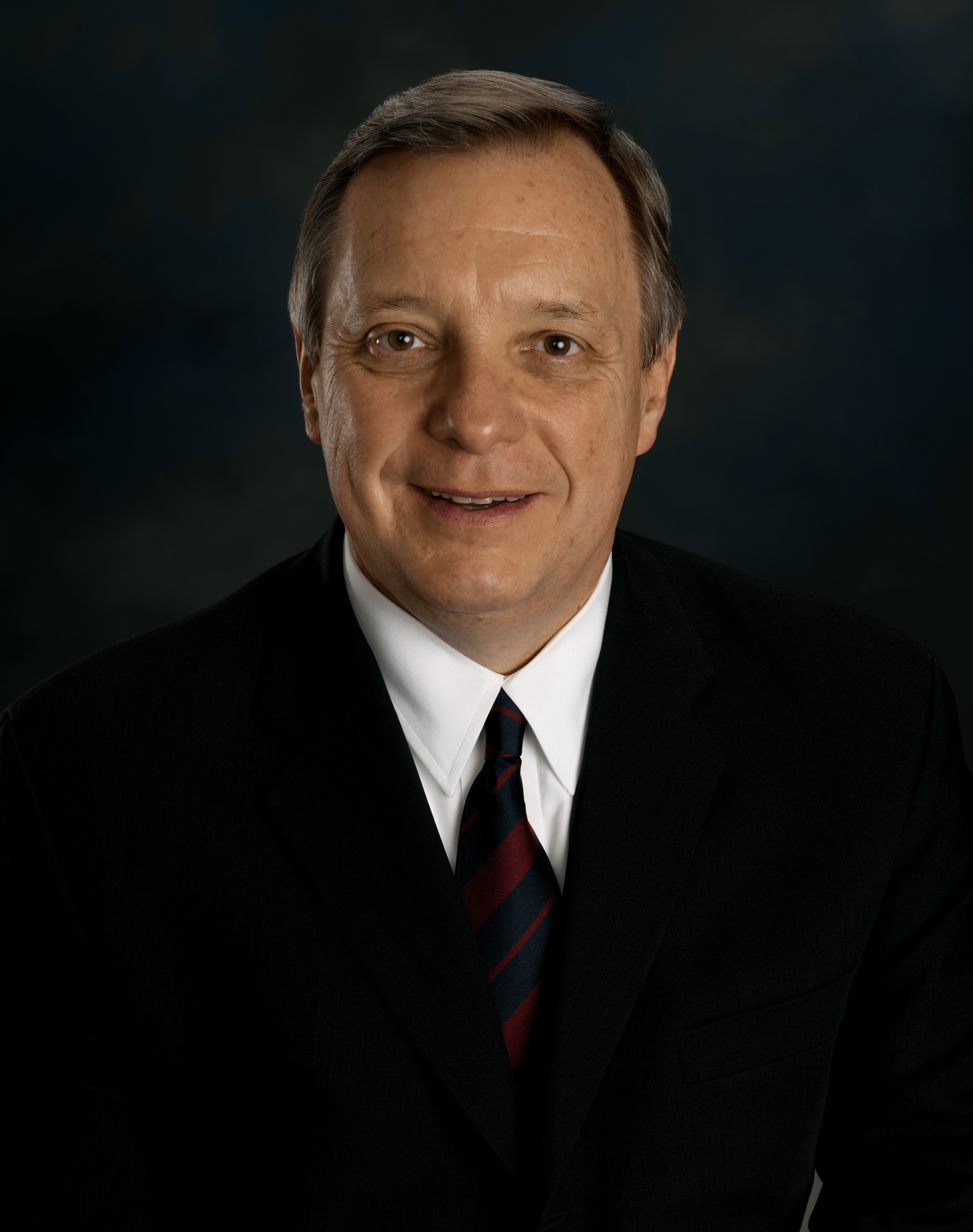

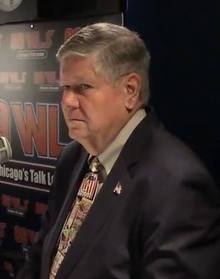
Nominee	Dick Durbin	Jim Oberweis
Party	Democratic	Republican
Popular vote	1,929,637	1,538,522
Percentage	53.5%	42.7%
- County results Durbin: 40–50% 50–60% 60–70% 70–80% Oberweis: 40–50% 50–60% 60–70% 70–80%
U.S. senator before election
Dick Durbin
Democratic
Elected U.S. Senator
Dick Durbin
Democratic

Three-term incumbent and Senate Majority Whip Democrat Dick Durbin had been re-elected with 68% of the vote in 2008. Durbin ran for a fourth term.

State Senator Jim Oberweis was the Republican nominee. He defeated primary challenger Doug Truax with 56% of the vote.

Illinois Democratic primary election
Party	Candidate	Votes	%
Democratic	Dick Durbin (incumbent)	429,031	100.00%
Total votes		429,031	100.00%

Illinois Republican primary election
Party	Candidate	Votes	%
Republican	Jim Oberweis	423,097	56.08%
Republican	Doug Truax	331,237	43.91%
Republican	Write-in	54	<0.01%
Total votes		754,388	100.00%

Illinois general election
Party	Candidate	Votes	%
Democratic	Dick Durbin (incumbent)	1,929,637	53.55%
Republican	Jim Oberweis	1,538,522	42.69%
Libertarian	Sharon Hansen	135,316	3.76%
Write-In	Various candidates	44	0.00%
Majority		391,115	10.85%
Total votes		3,603,519	100.00%
Democratic hold			

== Iowa ==
Iowa election
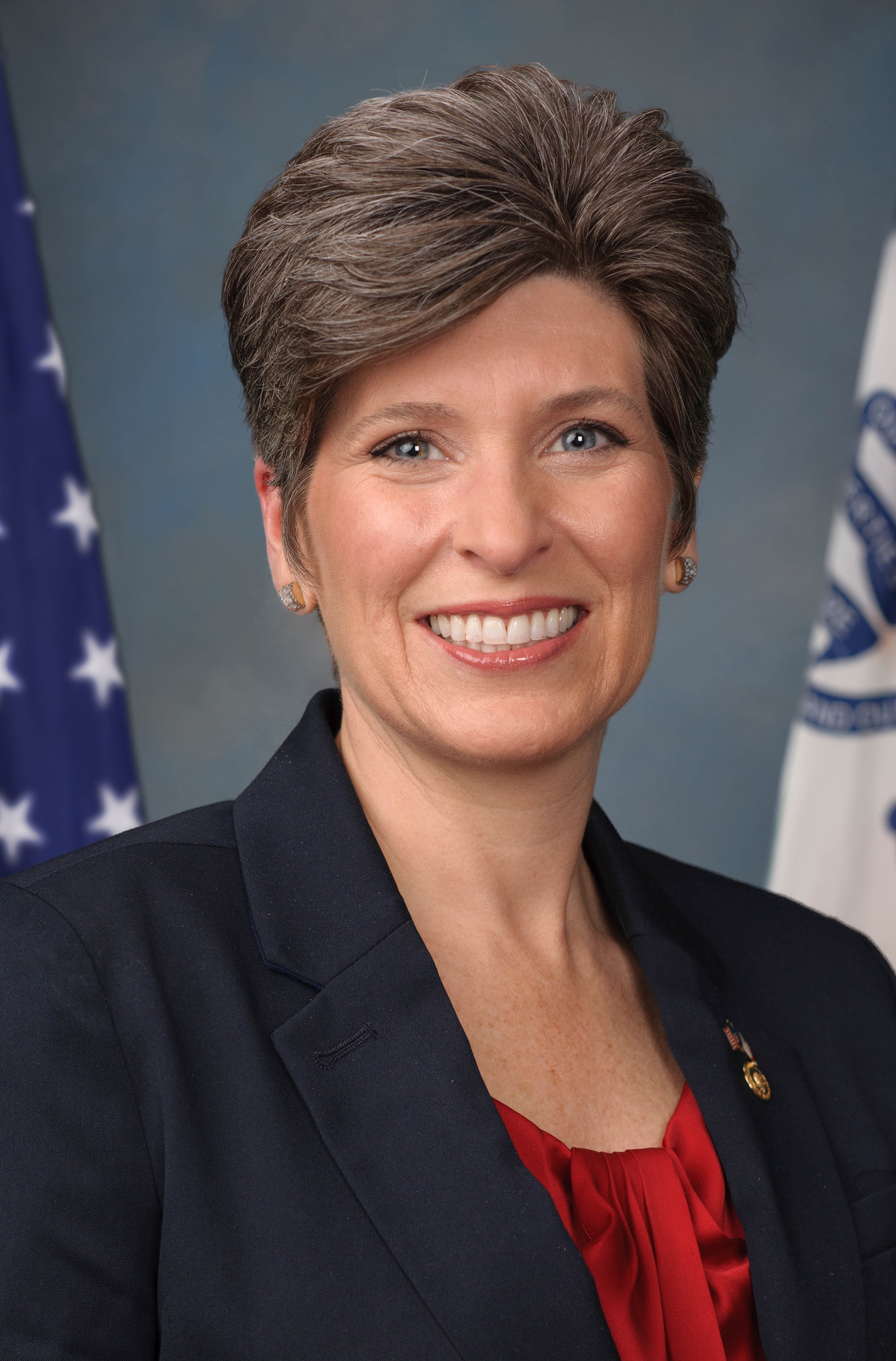

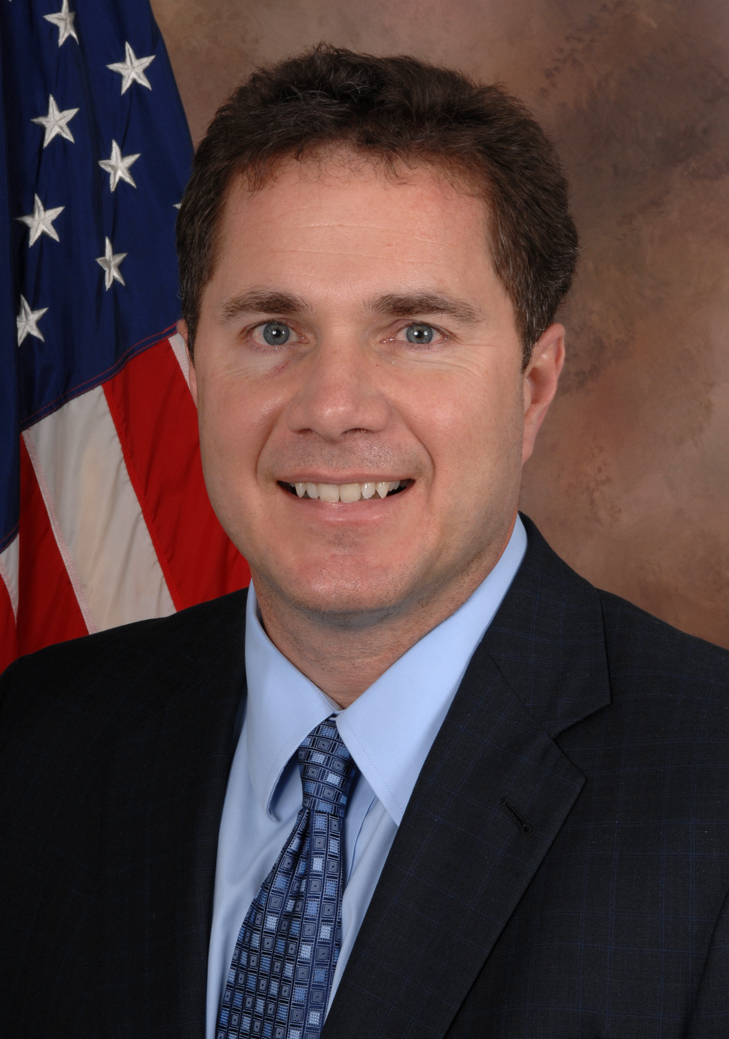
Nominee	Joni Ernst	Bruce Braley
Party	Republican	Democratic
Popular vote	588,575	494,370
Percentage	52.1%	43.8%
- Ernst: 40–50% 50–60% 60–70% 70–80% 80–90% Braley: 40–50% 50–60% 60–70%
U.S. senator before election
Tom Harkin
Democratic
Elected U.S. Senator
Joni Ernst
Republican

Five-term incumbent Democrat Tom Harkin had been re-elected with 63% of the vote in 2008. Harkin announced on January 26, 2013, that he would not seek a sixth term. Congressman Bruce Braley was the Democratic nominee.

State Senator Joni Ernst was the Republican nominee.

Doug Butzier, who was the Libertarian Party's nominee, died in a plane crash on October 13, 2014, but still appeared on the ballot.

Iowa Democratic primary election
Party	Candidate	Votes	%
Democratic	Bruce Braley	62,623	99.2%
Democratic	Write-ins	504	0.8%
Total votes		63,127	100.0%

Iowa Republican primary election
Party	Candidate	Votes	%
Republican	Joni Ernst	88,692	56.12%
Republican	Sam Clovis	28,434	17.99%
Republican	Mark Jacobs	26,582	16.82%
Republican	Matthew Whitaker	11,909	7.54%
Republican	Scott Schaben	2,270	1.44%
Republican	Write-ins	144	0.09%
Total votes		158,031	100.00%

2014 Iowa U.S. senator general election
Party	Candidate	Votes	%	±%
Republican	Joni Ernst	588,575	52.1%	+14.8%
Democratic	Bruce Braley	494,370	43.8%	−18.9%
Independent	Rick Stewart	26,815	2.4%	+2.4%
Libertarian	Douglas Butzier	8,232	0.7%	+0.7%
Independent	Bob Quast	5,873	0.5%	+0.5%
Independent	Ruth Smith	4,724	0.4%	+0.4%
Other	Write-ins	1,111	0.1%	+0.02%
Majority		94,205	8.3%	
Turnout		1,129,700		
Republican gain from Democratic		Swing		

== Kansas ==
Kansas election
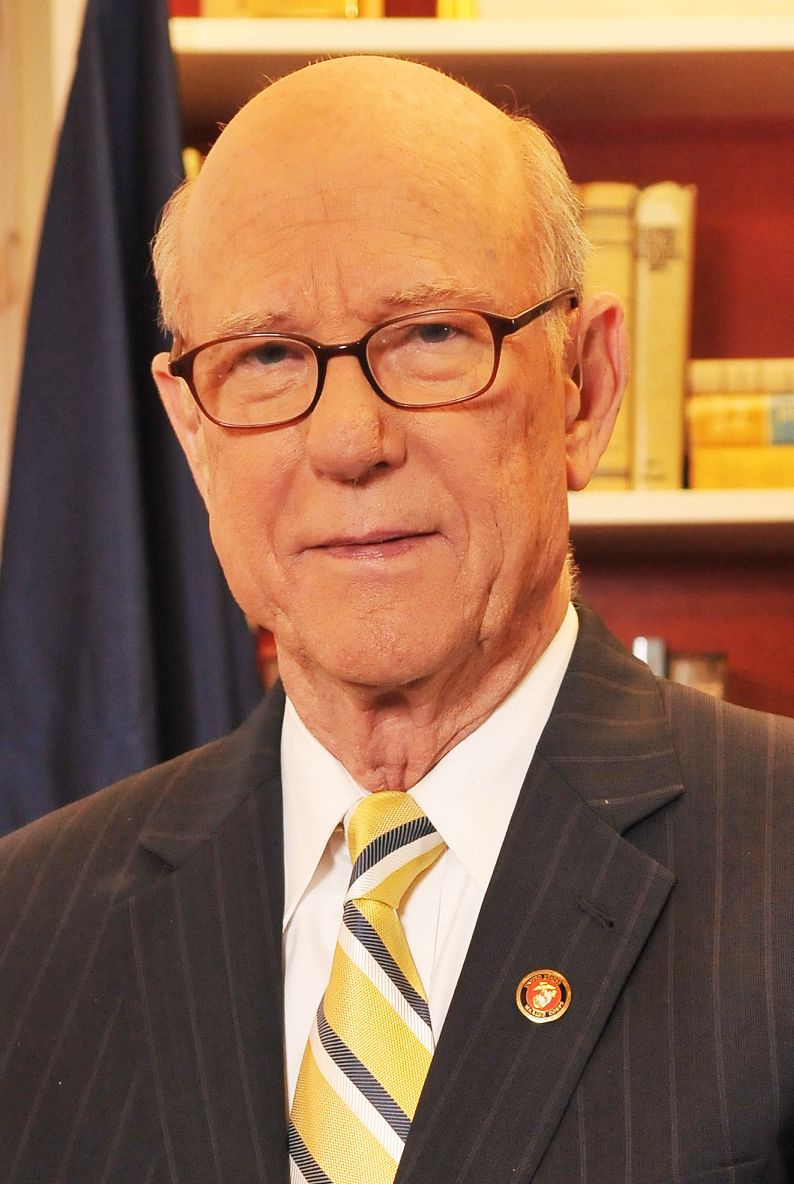

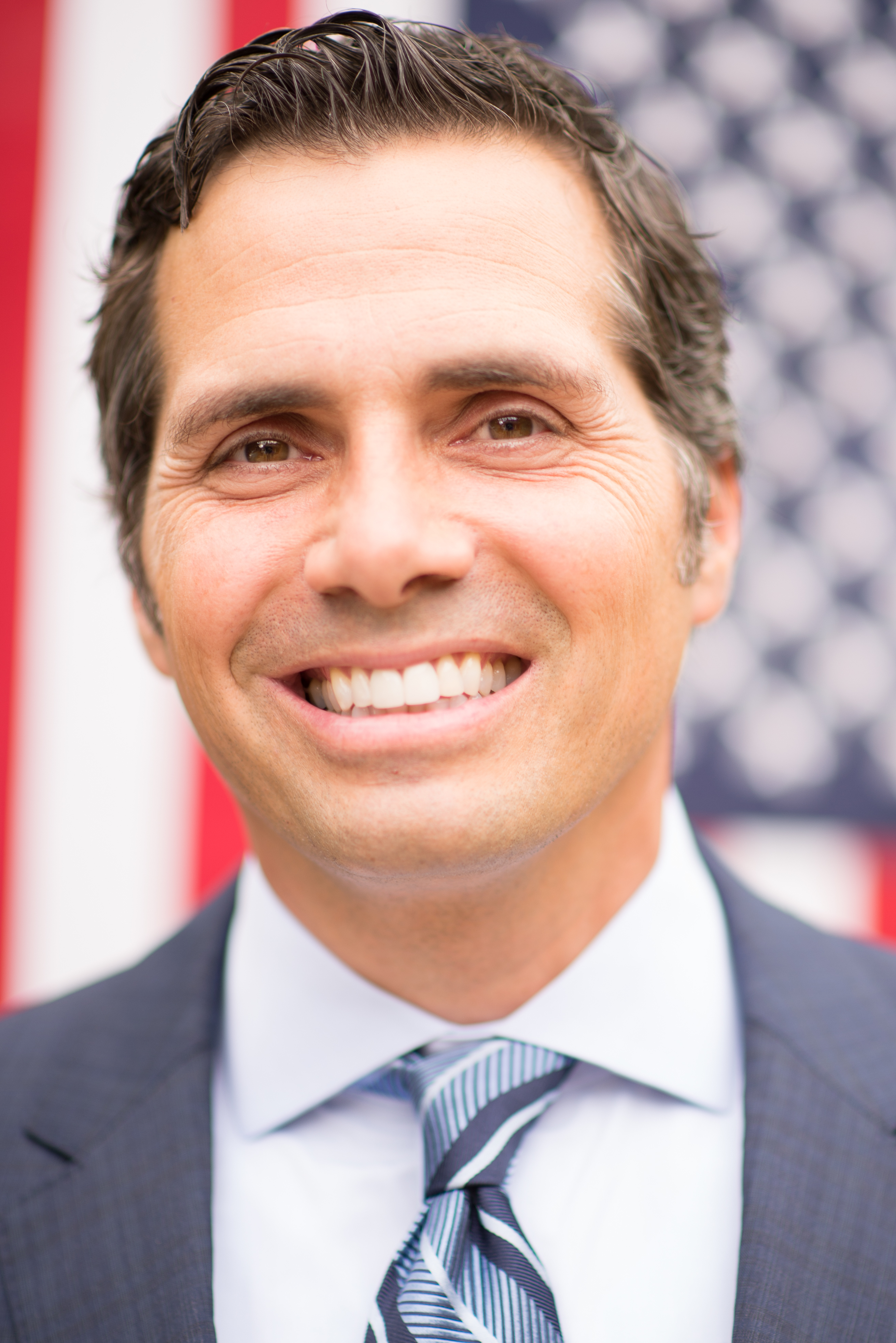
Nominee	Pat Roberts	Greg Orman
Party	Republican	Independent
Popular vote	460,350	368,372
Percentage	53.1%	42.5%
- County results Roberts: 40–50% 50–60% 60–70% 70–80% 80–90% Orman: 50–60% 60–70%
U.S. senator before election
Pat Roberts
Republican
Elected U.S. Senator
Pat Roberts
Republican

Three-term incumbent Republican Pat Roberts had been re-elected with 60% of the vote in 2008. Roberts sought a fourth term. He faced a primary challenge from radiologist Milton Wolf, a conservative Tea Party supporter. Roberts defeated Wolf in the Republican primary by 48% to 41%. Shawnee County District Attorney Chad Taylor won the Democratic nomination. Randall Batson from Wichita was on the general election ballot as a Libertarian. Also, Greg Orman qualified for the ballot as an independent.

On September 3, Taylor announced he was dropping out of the election, leading to speculation that Democrats would support Orman's candidacy. On September 18, the Kansas Supreme Court ruled that Taylor's name had to be removed from the ballot.

Kansas Republican primary election
Party	Candidate	Votes	%
Republican	Pat Roberts (incumbent)	127,089	48.08%
Republican	Milton Wolf	107,799	40.78%
Republican	D.J. Smith	15,288	5.78%
Republican	Alvin E. Zahnter	13,935	5.26%
Total votes		264,340	100.00%

Democratic primary election
Party	Candidate	Votes	%
Democratic	Chad Taylor	35,067	53.3%
Democratic	Patrick Wiesner	30,752	46.7%
Total votes		65,819	100.0%

2014 Kansas's U.S. Senate election
Party	Candidate	Votes	%
Republican	Pat Roberts (incumbent)	460,350	53.15%
Independent	Greg Orman	368,372	42.53%
Libertarian	Randall Batson	37,469	4.32%
Total votes		866,191	100.00%

== Kentucky ==
Kentucky election
- Turnout: 46.27%
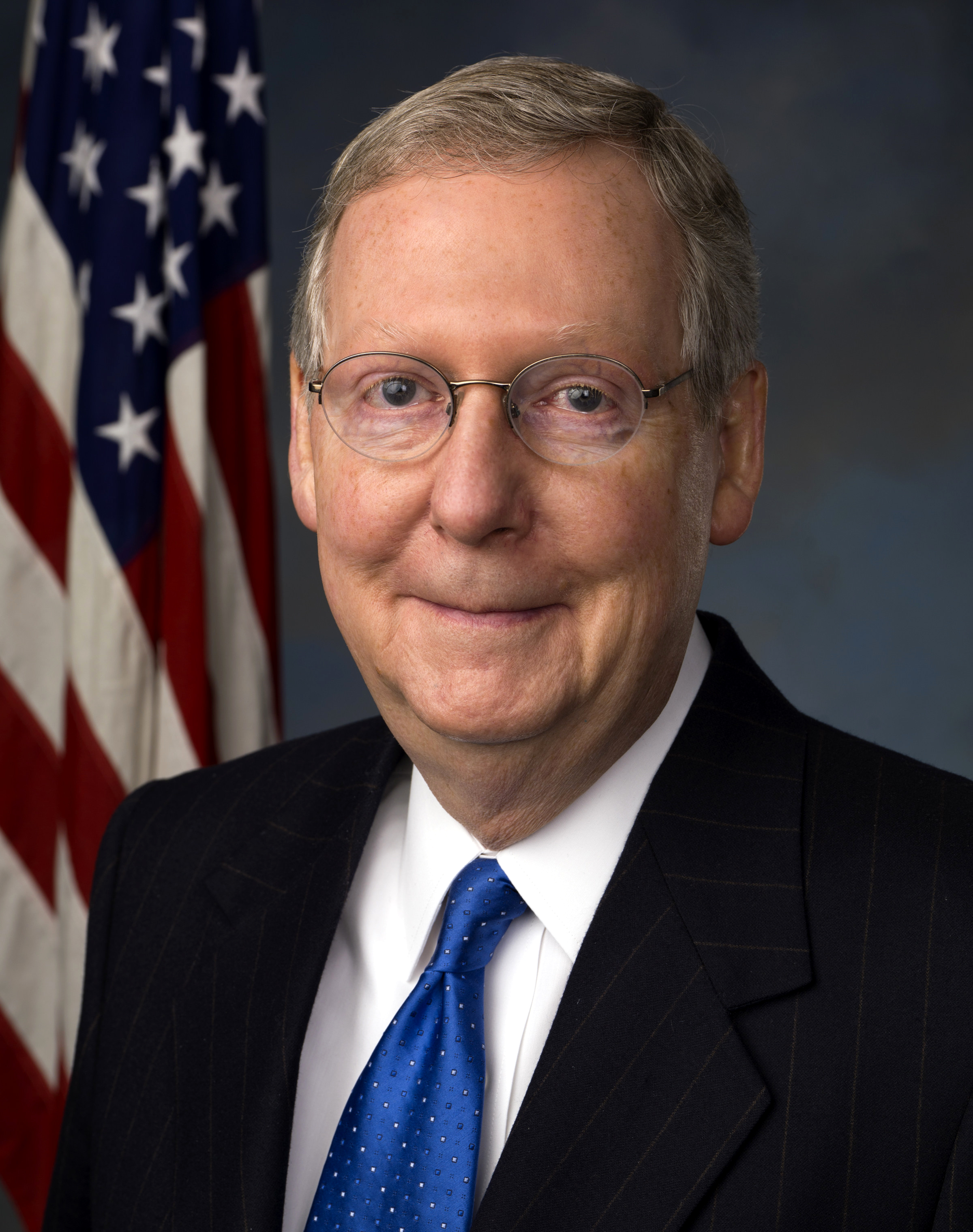

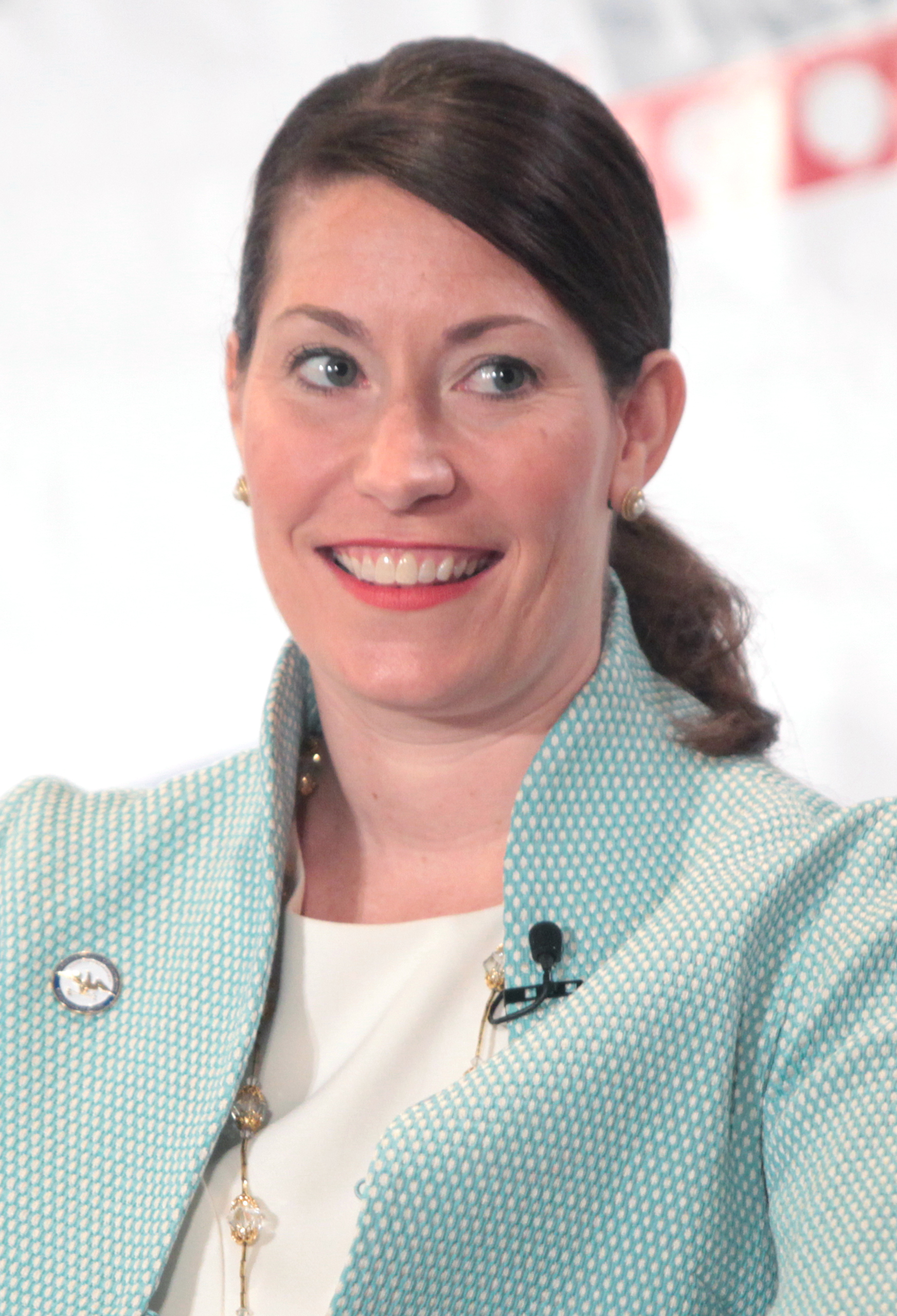
Nominee	Mitch McConnell	Alison Lundergan Grimes
Party	Republican	Democratic
Popular vote	806,787	584,698
Percentage	56.2%	40.7%
- McConnell: 40–50% 50–60% 60–70% 70–80% 80–90% Grimes: 40–50% 50–60%
U.S. senator before election
Mitch McConnell
Republican
Elected U.S. Senator
Mitch McConnell
Republican

Five-term Republican incumbent and Senate Minority Leader Mitch McConnell had been re-elected with 53% of the vote in 2008. McConnell sought re-election to a sixth term. McConnell defeated businessman Matt Bevin in the Republican primary on May 20.

Kentucky Secretary of State Alison Lundergan Grimes, with support from much of Kentucky's Democratic leadership, won the Democratic primary. Actress Ashley Judd publicly claimed to be considering a run for the Democratic nomination, but ultimately decided against it.

Ed Marksberry pursued an independent bid after dropping out of the Democratic field in September 2013.

Kentucky Republican primary election
Party	Candidate	Votes	%
Republican	Mitch McConnell (incumbent)	213,753	60.19%
Republican	Matt Bevin	125,787	35.42%
Republican	Shawna Sterling	7,214	2.03%
Republican	Chris Payne	5,338	1.51%
Republican	Brad Copas	3,024	0.85%
Total votes		355,116	100.00%

Kentucky Democratic primary election
Party	Candidate	Votes	%
Democratic	Alison Lundergan Grimes	307,821	76.47%
Democratic	Greg Leichty	32,602	8.10%
Democratic	Burrel Farnsley	32,310	8.03%
Democratic	Tom Recktenwald	29,791	7.40%
Total votes		402,524	100.00%

== Louisiana ==
Louisiana election
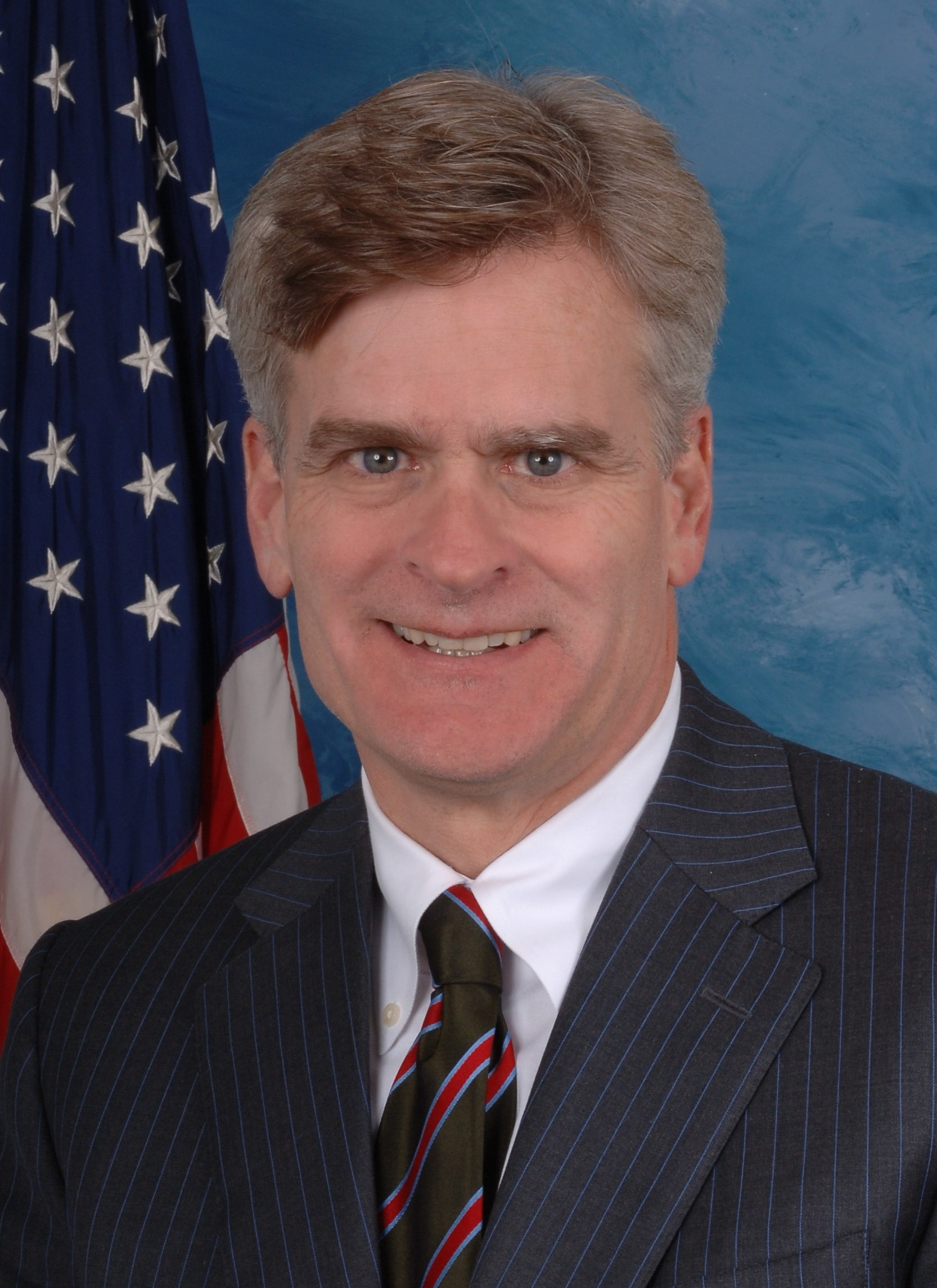

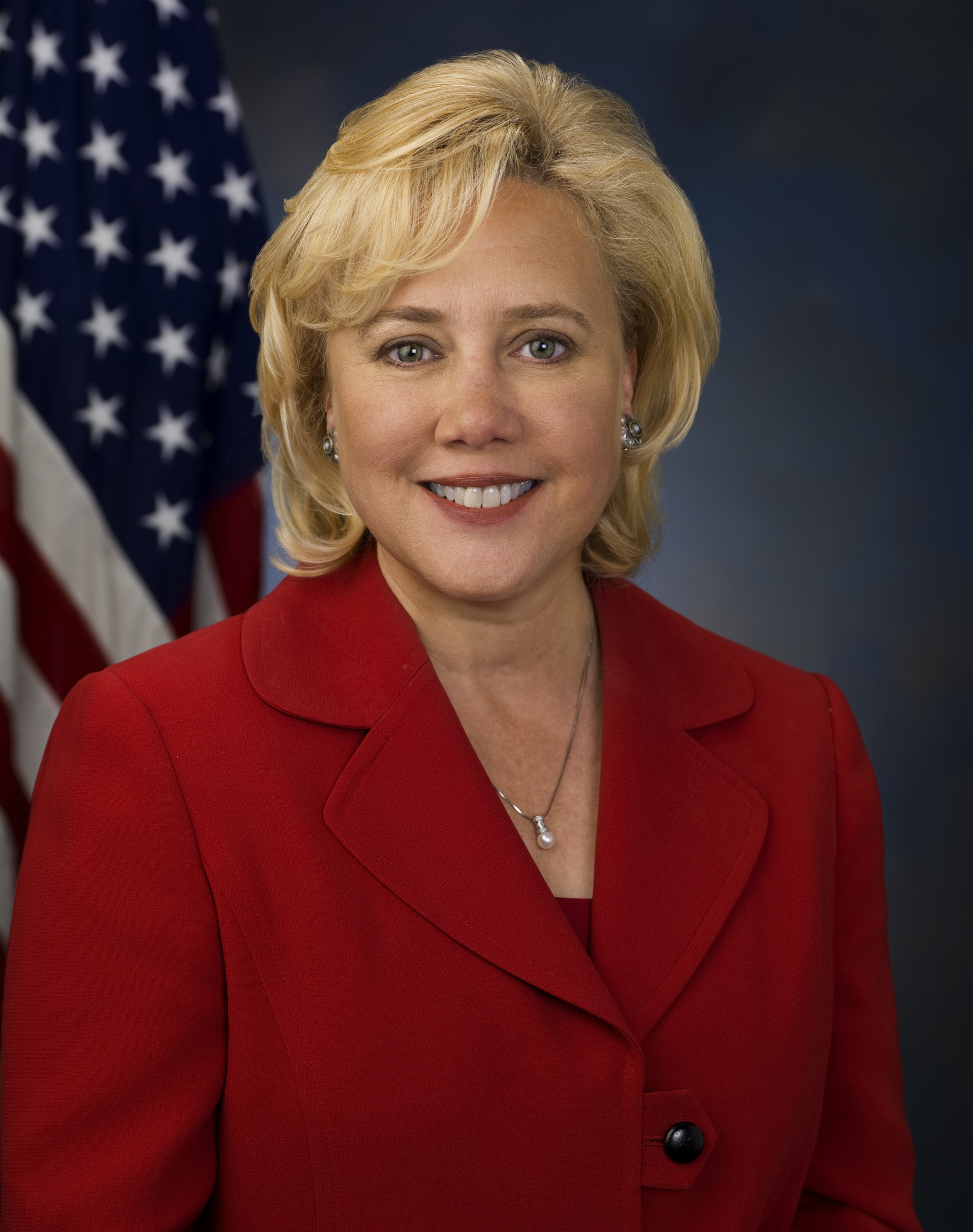
Nominee	Bill Cassidy	Mary Landrieu
Party	Republican	Democratic
Popular vote	712,379	561,210
Percentage	55.9%	44.1%
- Cassidy: 30–40% 40–50% 50–60% 60–70% 70–80% 80–90% Landrieu: 40–50% 50–60% 60–70% 80–90%
U.S. senator before election
Mary Landrieu
Democratic
Elected U.S. Senator
Bill Cassidy
Republican

Three-term incumbent Democrat Mary Landrieu had been re-elected with 52% of the vote in 2008. Landrieu ran for a fourth term.

Louisiana uses a unique jungle primary system that eschews primaries in favor of runoff elections between the top two candidates; this runoff can be avoided if the winning candidate receives over 50% of the vote. Democrats Wayne Ables, Vallian Senegal, and William Waymire ran against Landrieu in the election, as did Republicans Bill Cassidy (representative of Louisiana's 6th congressional district), Thomas Clements (small business owner), and retired Air Force Colonel Rob Maness. Electrical engineer Brannon McMorris ran as a Libertarian.

Because Republican candidate Maness took almost 14% of the votes in the primary, there was a runoff election on December 6, 2014, between Landrieu (42%) and Cassidy (41%). Cassidy won the runoff with 56% of the vote.

Louisiana jungle primary election
Party	Candidate	Votes	%
Democratic	Mary Landrieu (incumbent)	619,402	42.08%
Republican	Bill Cassidy	603,048	40.97%
Republican	Rob Maness	202,556	13.76%
Republican	Thomas Clements	14,173	0.96%
Libertarian	Brannon McMorris	13,034	0.89%
Democratic	Wayne Ables	11,323	0.77%
Democratic	William Waymire	4,673	0.32%
Democratic	Vallian Senegal	3,835	0.26%
Total votes		1,473,826	100.00%

United States Senate election runoff in Louisiana, 2014
Party	Candidate	Votes	%
Republican	Bill Cassidy	712,379	55.93%
Democratic	Mary Landrieu (incumbent)	561,210	44.07%
Total votes		1,273,589	100.00%
Republican gain from Democratic			

== Maine ==
Maine election
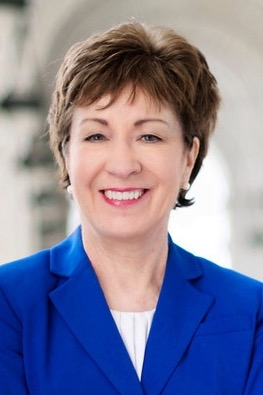

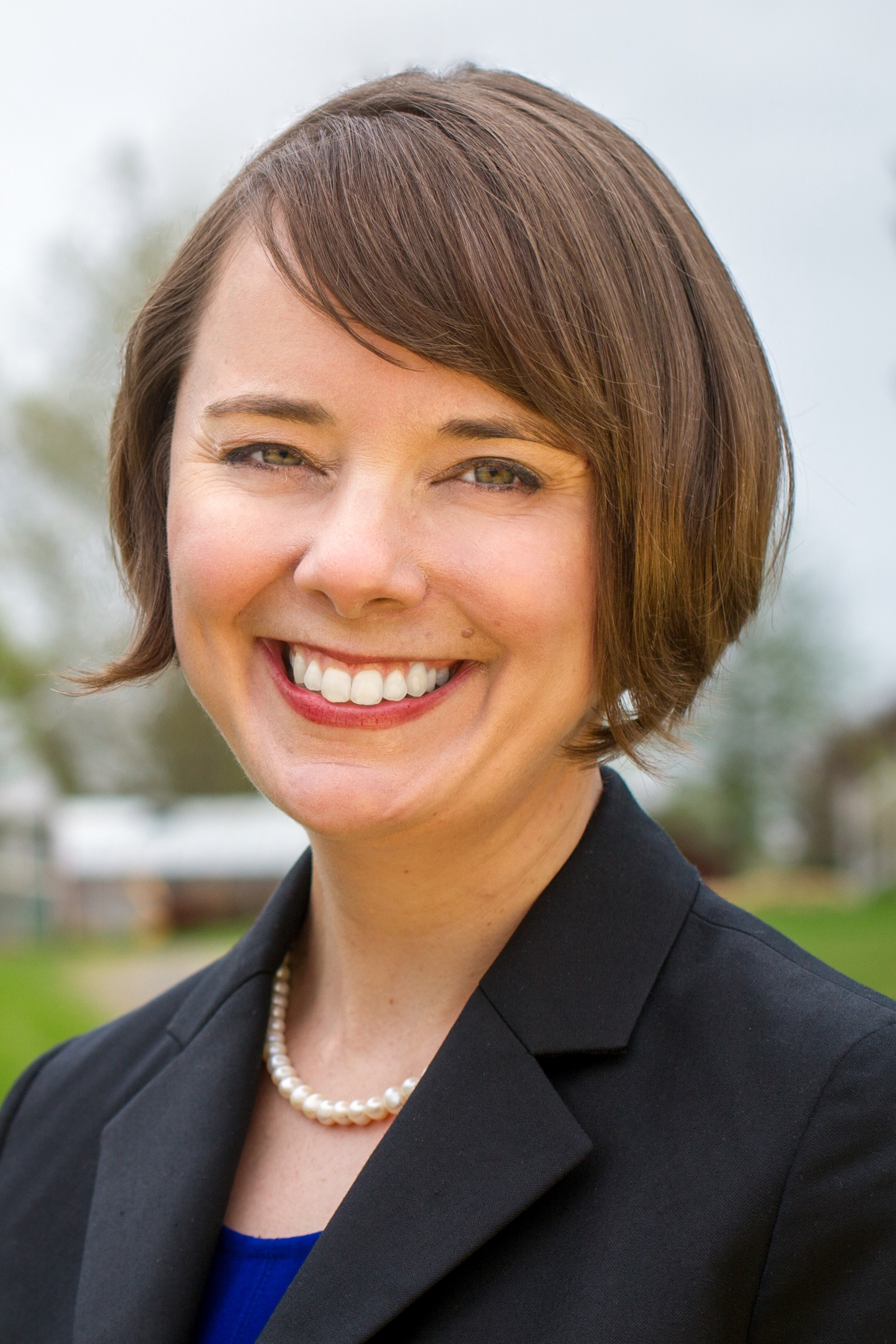
Nominee	Susan Collins	Shenna Bellows
Party	Republican	Democratic
Popular vote	413,495	190,244
Percentage	68.5%	31.5%
- Collins: 50–60% 60–70% 70–80% 80–90% >90% Bellows: 50–60% 60–70% >90%
U.S. senator before election
Susan Collins
Republican
Elected U.S. Senator
Susan Collins
Republican

Three-term incumbent Republican Susan Collins was seeking a fourth term. Shenna Bellows, former executive director of the American Civil Liberties Union of Maine, was the Democratic nominee.

Maine Republican primary election
Party	Candidate	Votes	%
Republican	Susan Collins (incumbent)	59,767	100.00%
Total votes		59,767	100.00%

Maine Democratic primary election
Party	Candidate	Votes	%
Democratic	Shenna Bellows	65,085	100.00%
Total votes		65,085	100.00%

Maine general election
Party	Candidate	Votes	%
Republican	Susan Collins (incumbent)	413,495	68.46%
Democratic	Shenna Bellows	190,244	31.50%
Others		269	0.04%
Total votes		604,008	100.00%
Republican hold			

== Massachusetts ==
Massachusetts election
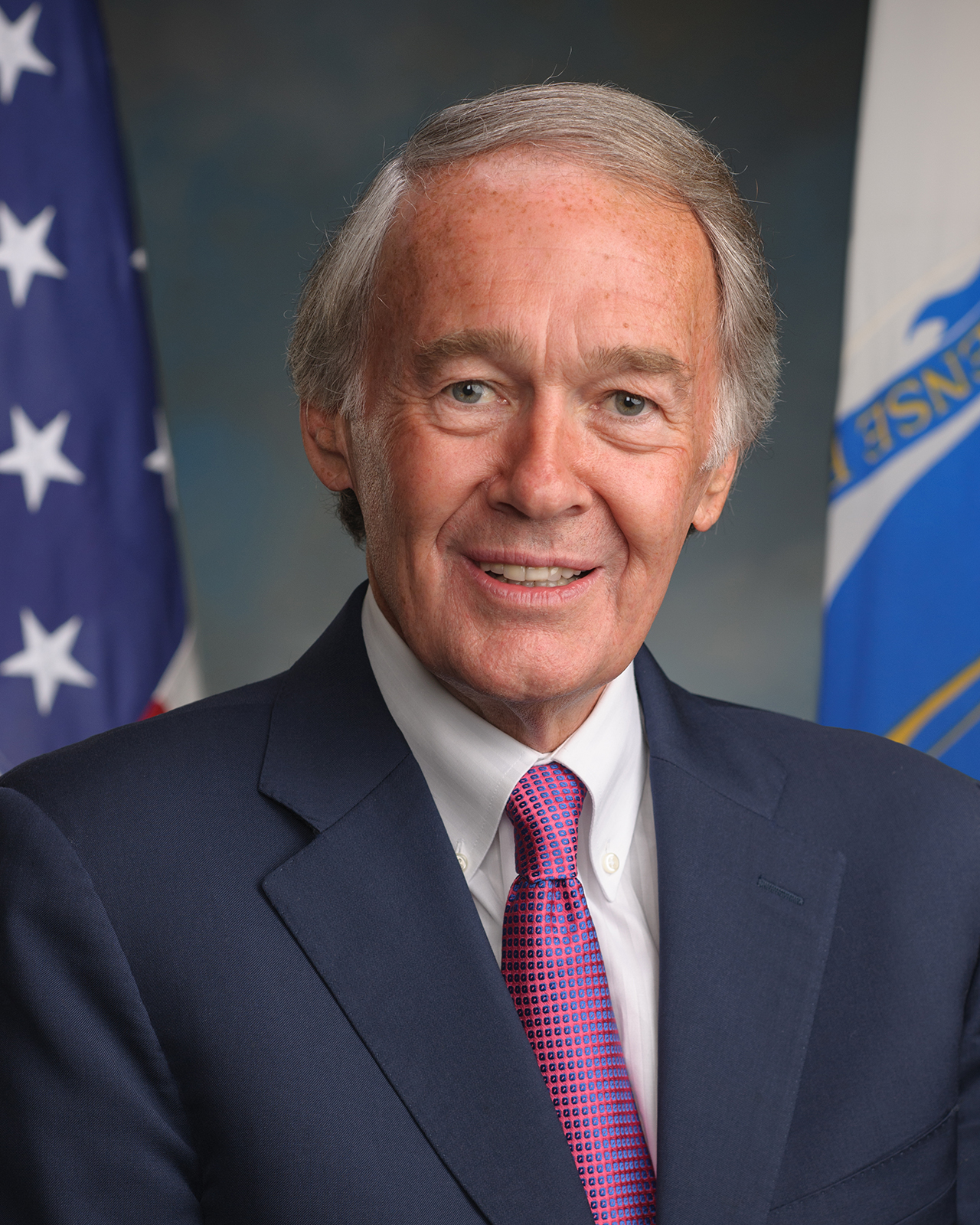

Nominee	Ed Markey	Brian Herr
Party	Democratic	Republican
Popular vote	1,289,944	791,950
Percentage	61.9%	38.0%
- Markey:: 50–60% 60–70% 70–80% 80–90% >90% Herr: 50–60% 60–70% Tie: 40–50%
U.S. senator before election
Ed Markey
Democratic
Elected U.S. Senator
Ed Markey
Democratic

Five-term incumbent and 2004 Democratic presidential nominee John Kerry had been re-elected with 66% of the vote in 2008. Kerry resigned in early 2013 to become U.S. secretary of state. Governor Deval Patrick appointed Democrat Mo Cowan to the seat. Democratic Congressman Ed Markey beat Republican Gabriel E. Gomez in the June 25, 2013 special election by a 55% to 45% margin. Markey had served the remainder of Kerry's term before running for re-election to a first full term in 2014. Hopkinton Town Selectman Brian Herr was the Republican nominee.

General election
Party	Candidate	Votes	%
Democratic	Ed Markey (incumbent)	1,285,736	61.96%
Republican	Brian Herr	789,378	38.04%
Total votes		2,075,114	100.00%
Democratic hold			

== Michigan ==
Michigan election
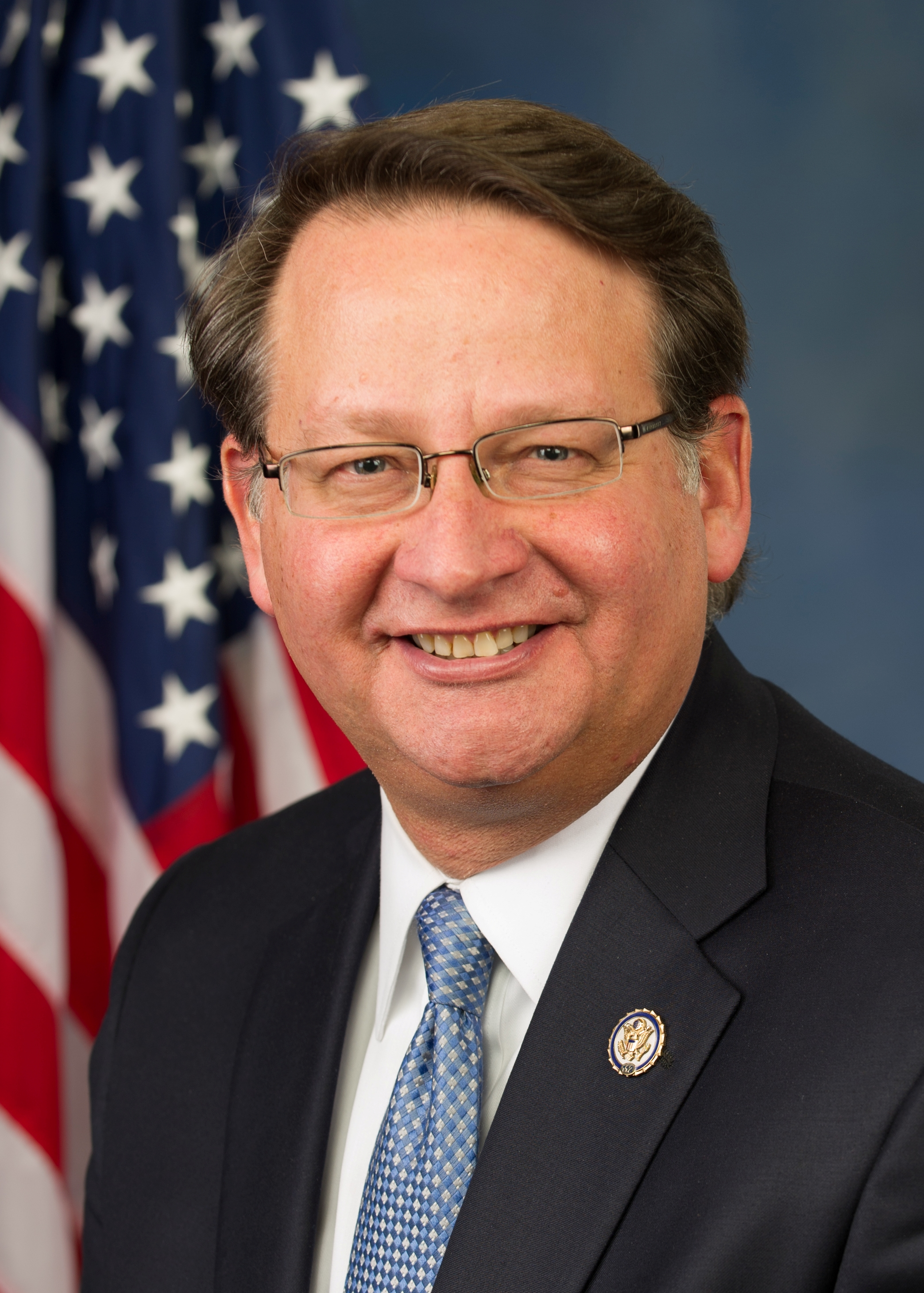

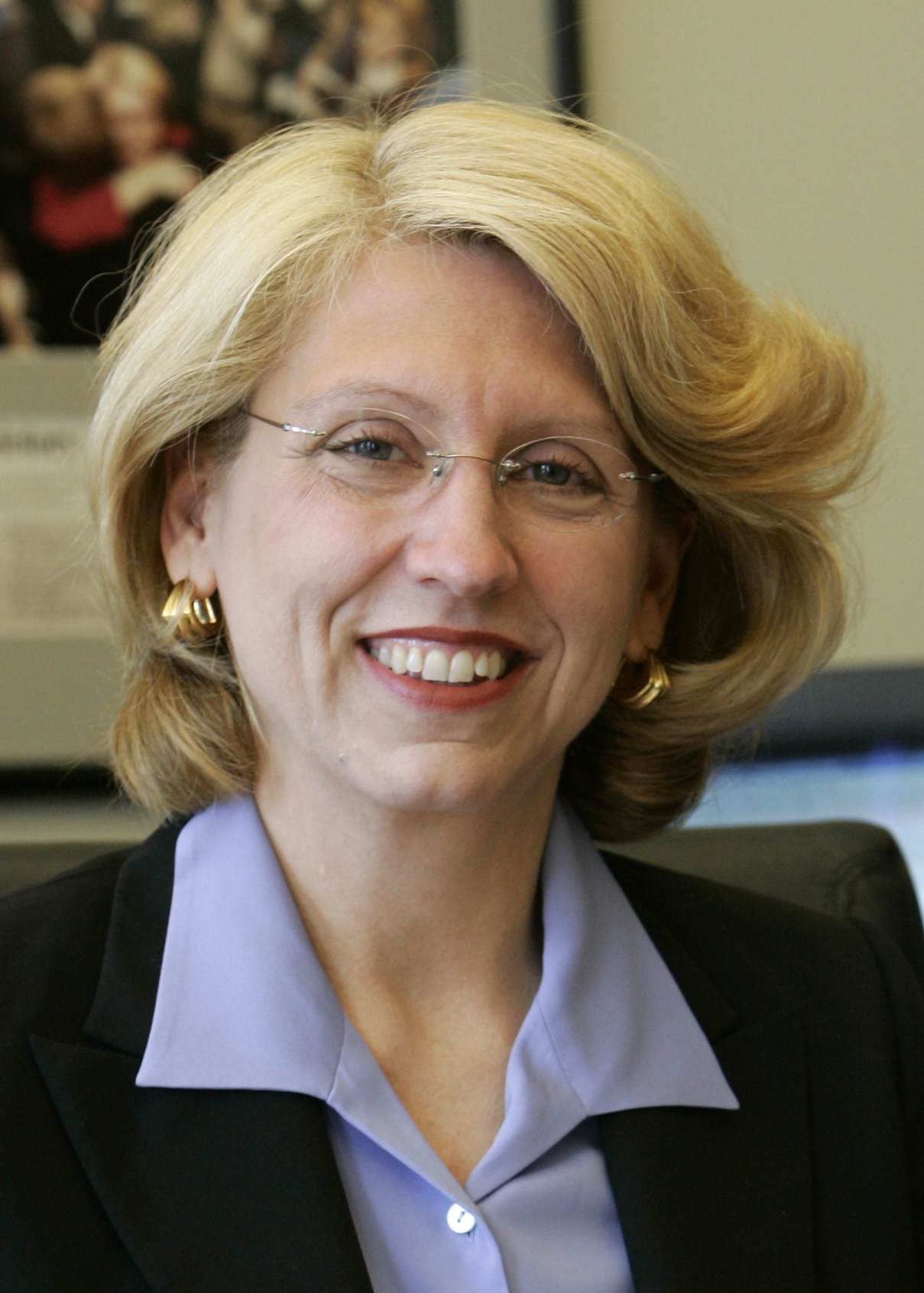
Nominee	Gary Peters	Terri Lynn Land
Party	Democratic	Republican
Popular vote	1,704,936	1,290,199
Percentage	54.6%	41.3%
- Peters: 40–50% 50–60% 60–70% 70–80% Land: 40–50% 50–60% 60–70%
U.S. senator before election
Carl Levin
Democratic
Elected U.S. Senator
Gary Peters
Democratic

Six-term incumbent Senator and Chairman of the Armed Services Committee Democrat Carl Levin, the longest-serving senator in Michigan's history, had been re-elected with 63% of the vote in 2008. Levin announced on March 7, 2013, that he would not seek re-election.

Three-term Democratic Representative Gary Peters of MI-14 was the Democratic nominee. He defeated Republican former secretary of state Terri Lynn Land, who was unopposed for the Republican nomination.

Michigan Democratic primary election
Party	Candidate	Votes	%
Democratic	Gary Peters	504,102	100.00%
Total votes		504,102	100.00%

Michigan Republican primary election
Party	Candidate	Votes	%
Republican	Terri Lynn Land	588,084	100.00%
Total votes		588,084	100.00%

Michigan general election
Party	Candidate	Votes	%	±%
Democratic	Gary Peters	1,704,936	54.6%	−8.1%
Republican	Terri Lynn Land	1,290,199	41.3%	+7.5%
Libertarian	Jim Fulner	62,897	2.0%	+.4%
Green	Chris Wahmhoff	26,137	0.9%	0
U.S. Taxpayers	Richard Matkin	37,529	1.2%	+.6%
	Write-ins	77	0.0%	0.0%
Majority		414,737		
Turnout		3,121,775		
Democratic hold		Swing		

== Minnesota ==
Minnesota election
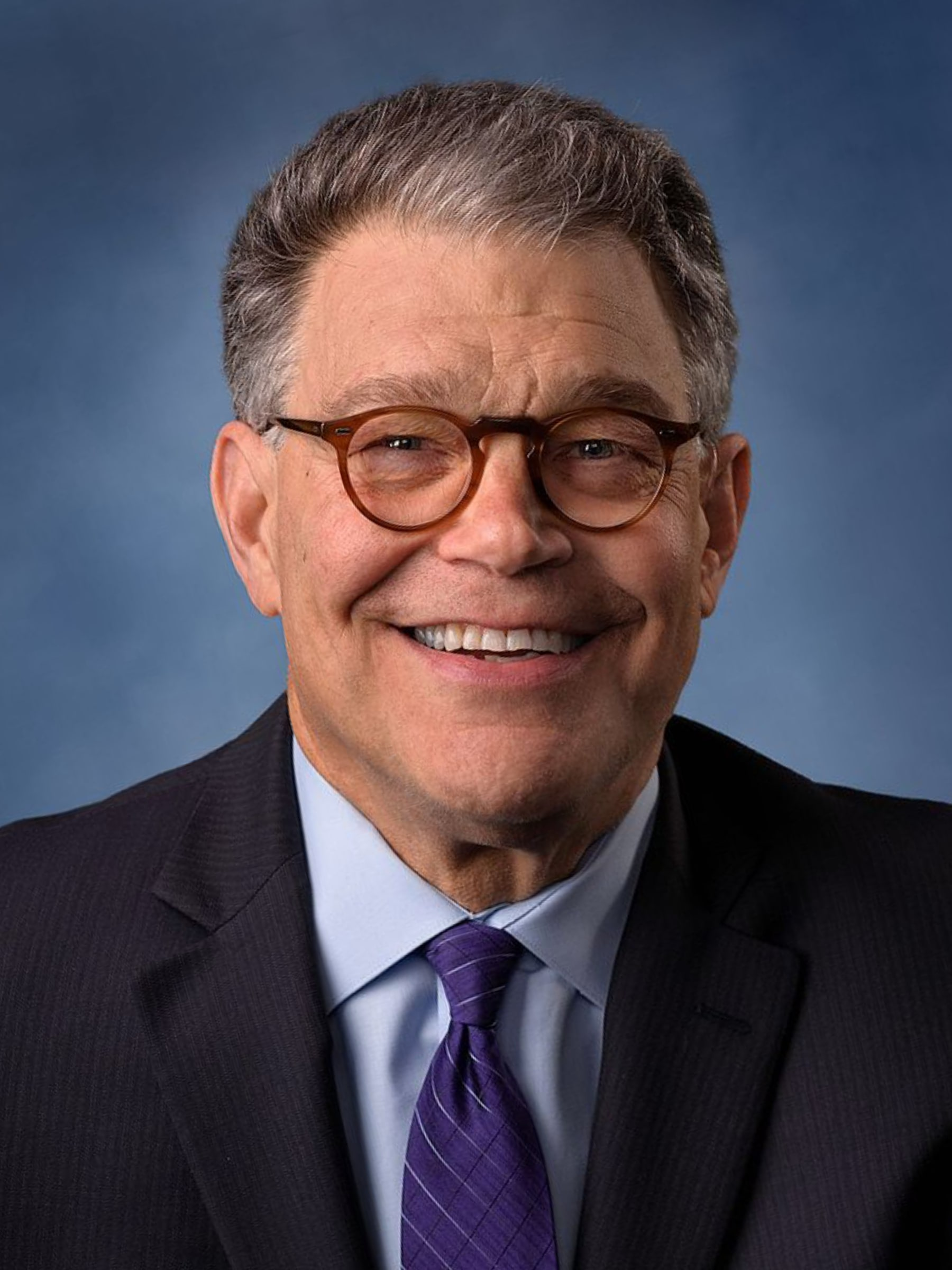

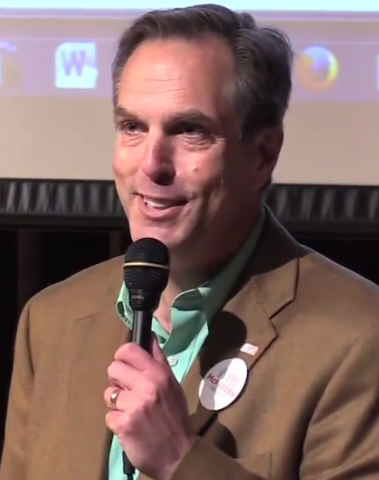
Nominee	Al Franken	Mike McFadden
Party	Democratic (DFL)	Republican
Popular vote	1,053,205	850,227
Percentage	53.2%	42.9%
- Franken: 40-50% 50-60% 60-70% McFadden: 40-50% 50-60%
U.S. senator before election
Al Franken
Democratic (DFL)
Elected U.S. Senator
Al Franken
Democratic (DFL)

One-term incumbent Democrat Al Franken unseated one-term Republican Norm Coleman by 312 votes in a contested three-way race with 42% of the vote in 2008; the third candidate in the race, former senator Dean Barkley of the Independence Party of Minnesota, won 15% of the vote. Franken sought re-election. State Representative Jim Abeler, St. Louis County Commissioner Chris Dahlberg, co-CEO of Lazard Middle Market Mike McFadden, bison farmer and former hair salon owner Monti Moreno, state Senator Julianne Ortman, and U.S. Navy reservist Phillip Parrish ran for the Republican nomination. McFadden won the Republican primary and was the Republican nominee in the general election.

Hannah Nicollet of the Independence Party of Minnesota also ran.

Democratic primary election
Party	Candidate	Votes	%
Democratic (DFL)	Al Franken (incumbent)	182,720	94.5%
Democratic (DFL)	Sandra Henningsgard	10,627	5.5%
Total votes		193,347	100.0%

Republican primary election
Party	Candidate	Votes	%
Republican	Mike McFadden (endorsed)	129,601	71.74%
Republican	Jim Abeler	26,714	14.79%
Republican	David Carlson	16,449	9.10%
Republican	Patrick Munro	5,058	2.80%
Republican	Ole Savior	2,840	1.57%
Total votes		180,662	100.00%

Independence primary election
Party	Candidate	Votes	%
Independence	Steve Carlson	2,148	33.91%
Independence	Kevin Terrell (endorsed)	1,376	21.72%
Independence	Jack Shepard	1,130	17.83%
Independence	Stephen Williams	862	13.60%
Independence	Tom Books	820	12.94%
Total votes		6,336	100.00%

Minnesota general election
Party	Candidate	Votes	%	±%
Democratic (DFL)	Al Franken (incumbent)	1,053,205	53.15%	+11.16%
Republican	Mike McFadden	850,227	42.91%	+0.93%
Independence	Steve Carlson	47,530	2.40%	−12.75%
Libertarian	Heather Johnson	29,685	1.50%	+1.02%
Write-ins	Others	881	0.04%	
Majority		202,978	10.24%	
Total votes		1,981,528		
Democratic (DFL) hold		Swing		

== Mississippi ==
Mississippi election
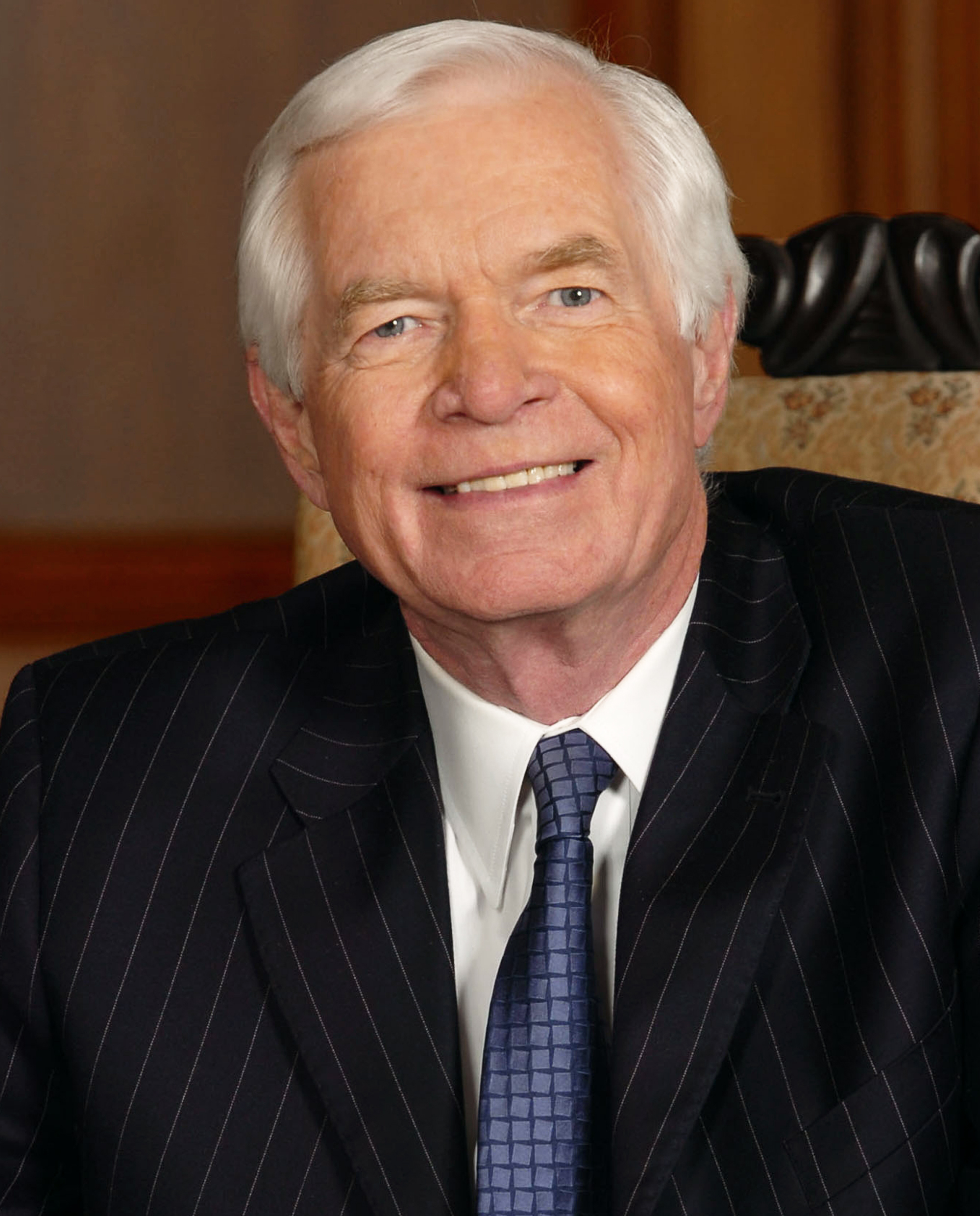

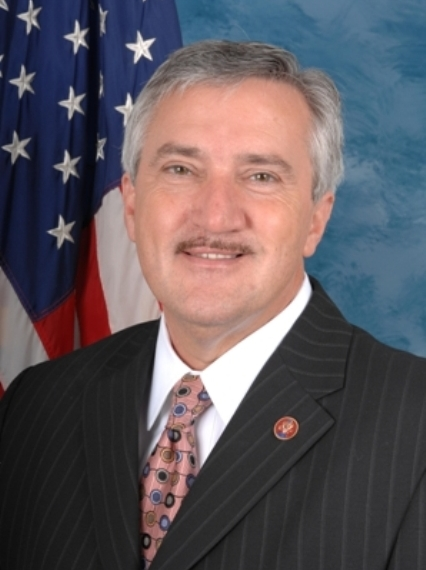
Nominee	Thad Cochran	Travis Childers
Party	Republican	Democratic
Popular vote	378,481	239,439
Percentage	59.9%	37.9%
- County results Cochran: 50–60% 60–70% 70–80% Childers: 40-50% 50–60% 60–70% 70–80%
U.S. senator before election
Thad Cochran
Republican
Elected U.S. Senator
Thad Cochran
Republican

Six-term incumbent Republican Thad Cochran, re-elected with 62% of the vote in 2008, ran for re-election. Cochran was the last incumbent senator to declare his plans, leading to widespread speculation that he might announce his retirement. Tea Party candidate Chris McDaniel, a conservative Mississippi state senator, ran against Cochran in the Republican primary. Neither McDaniel nor Cochran was able to get 50% of the vote in the first round of the primary, so a runoff election was held June 24. Cochran won the runoff election by 51% to 49%, with the help of Democratic voters eligible to vote in the state's open primaries who chose Cochran as their preferred Republican. McDaniel filed a lawsuit to challenge the results of the runoff, but the challenge was rejected on appeal by the Supreme Court of Mississippi.

Former Congressman Travis Childers was the Democratic nominee.

Mississippi Republican primary election
Party	Candidate	Votes	%
Republican	Chris McDaniel	157,733	49.5%
Republican	Thad Cochran (incumbent)	156,315	49.0%
Republican	Thomas Carey	4,854	1.5%
Total votes		318,902	100.0%

Mississippi Republican primary election runoff
Party	Candidate	Votes	%	±%
Republican	Thad Cochran (incumbent)	194,932	51.00%	+2.00%
Republican	Chris McDaniel	187,265	49.00%	−0.50%
Total votes		382,197	100.00%	0.00%

Mississippi Democratic primary election
Party	Candidate	Votes	%
Democratic	Travis Childers	63,548	73.9%
Democratic	Bill Marcy	10,361	12.1%
Democratic	William Compton	8,465	9.9%
Democratic	Jonathan Rawl	3,492	4.1%
Total votes		85,866	100.0%

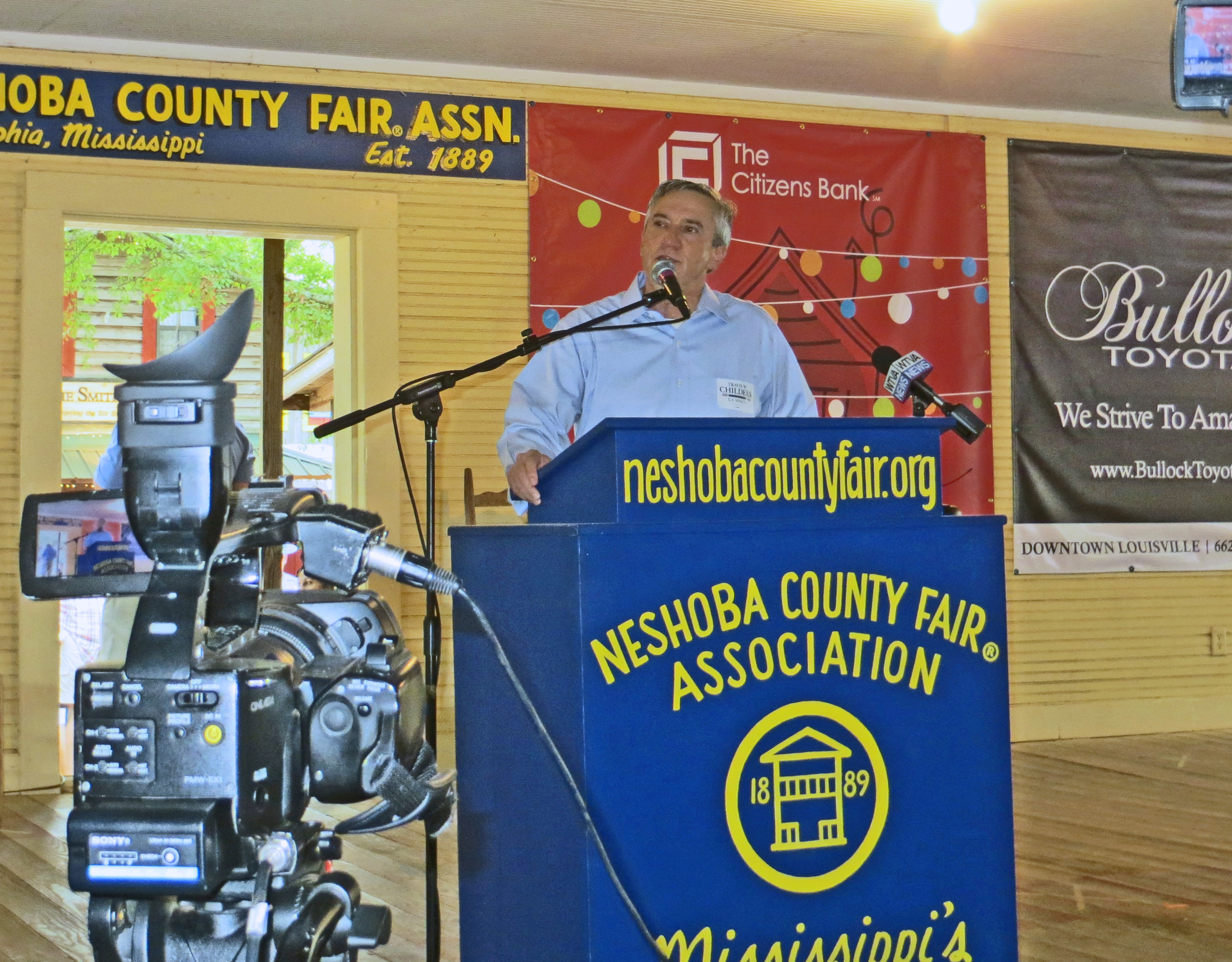
Childers campaigning for Senate

Mississippi general election
Party	Candidate	Votes	%	±%
Republican	Thad Cochran (incumbent)	378,481	59.90%	−1.54%
Democratic	Travis Childers	239,439	37.89%	−0.67%
Reform	Shawn O'Hara	13,938	2.21%	+2.21%
Total votes		631,858	100.00%	
Republican hold		Swing	−0.87%	

== Montana ==
Montana election
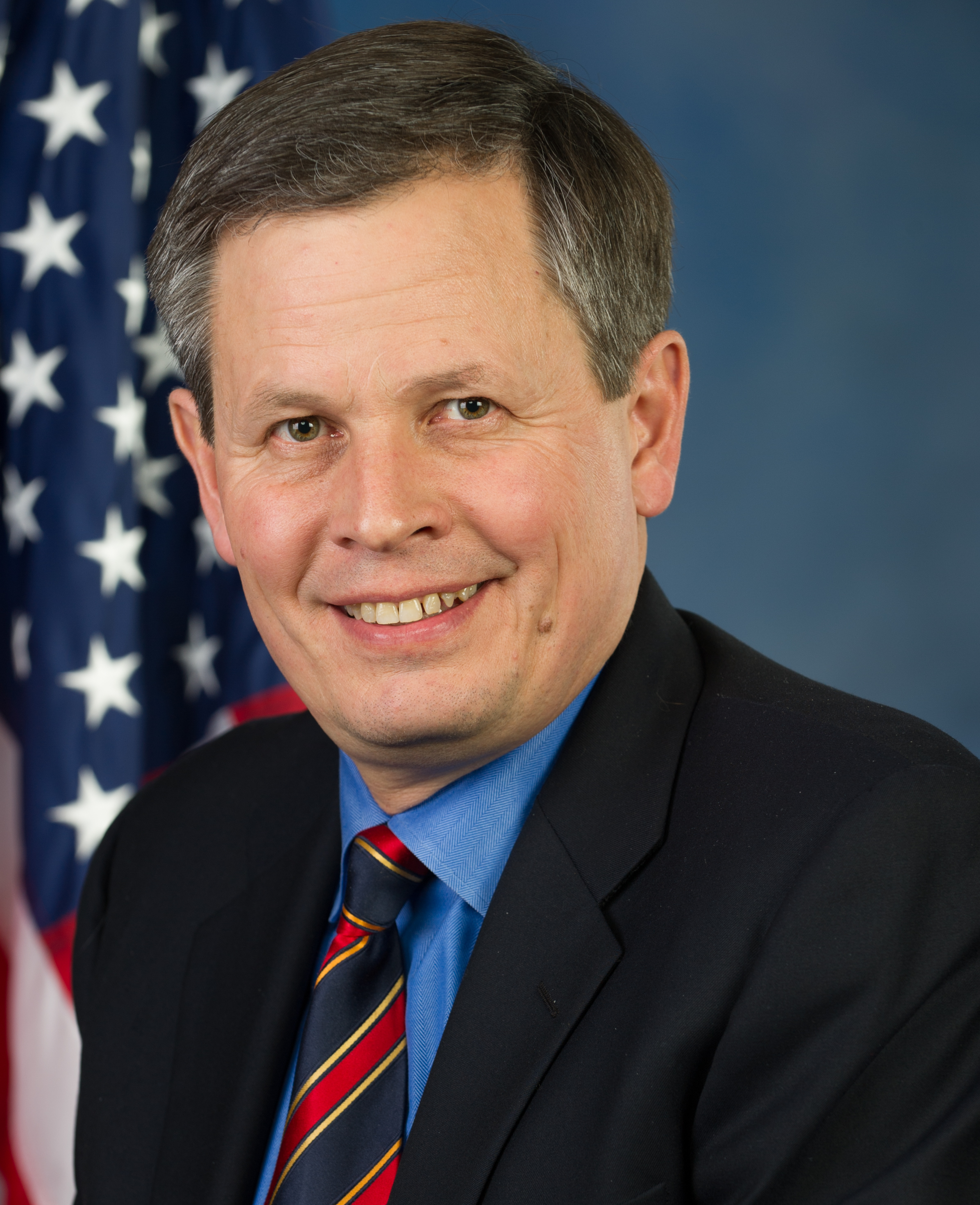

Nominee	Steve Daines	Amanda Curtis
Party	Republican	Democratic
Popular vote	213,709	148,184
Percentage	57.8%	40.1%
- County results Daines: 50–60% 60–70% 70–80% 80–90% Curtis: 50–60% 60–70%
U.S. senator before election
John Walsh
Democratic
Elected U.S. Senator
Steve Daines
Republican

Six-term incumbent Democrat Max Baucus, the longest-serving senator in Montana's history, had been re-elected with 73% of the vote in 2008. Baucus announced on April 23, 2013, that he would retire in 2014, rather than seek re-election to a seventh term. Baucus was appointed as the United States ambassador to China, leading him to resign from the Senate in February 2014.

Following Baucus's confirmation as ambassador, Governor Steve Bullock appointed Lieutenant Governor John Walsh to fill the vacant senate seat. Walsh went on to defeat former Lieutenant Governor John Bohlinger in the Democratic primary, but later pulled out of the race amid controversy over alleged plagiarism in a 2007 research paper. The Montana Democratic Party held a special nominating convention on August 16 to choose a replacement for Walsh. First-term State Representative Amanda Curtis won the nomination, thereby becoming the new Democratic nominee.

Congressman Steve Daines won the Republican nomination over state Representative Champ Edmunds of Missoula and David Leaser of Kalispell.

Montana Democratic primary election
Party	Candidate	Votes	%
Democratic	John Walsh (incumbent)	48,665	64.04%
Democratic	John Bohlinger	17,187	22.62%
Democratic	Dirk Adams	10,139	13.34%
Total votes		75,991	100.00%

Montana Democratic convention
Party	Candidate	Votes	%
Democratic	Amanda Curtis	82	64.0%
Democratic	Dirk Adams	46	36.0%
Total votes		128	100.0%

Montana Republican primary election
Party	Candidate	Votes	%
Republican	Steve Daines	110,565	83.37%
Republican	Susan Cundiff	11,909	8.98%
Republican	Champ Edmunds	10,151	7.65%
Total votes		132,625	100.00%

2014 Montana's U.S. Senate election
Party	Candidate	Votes	%	±%
Republican	Steve Daines	213,709	57.79%	+30.71%
Democratic	Amanda Curtis	148,184	40.07%	−32.85%
Libertarian	Roger Roots	7,933	2.14%	n/a
Majority		65,525	17.72%	+63.56%
Turnout		369,826	100.00%	
Republican gain from Democratic		Swing		

== Nebraska ==
Nebraska election
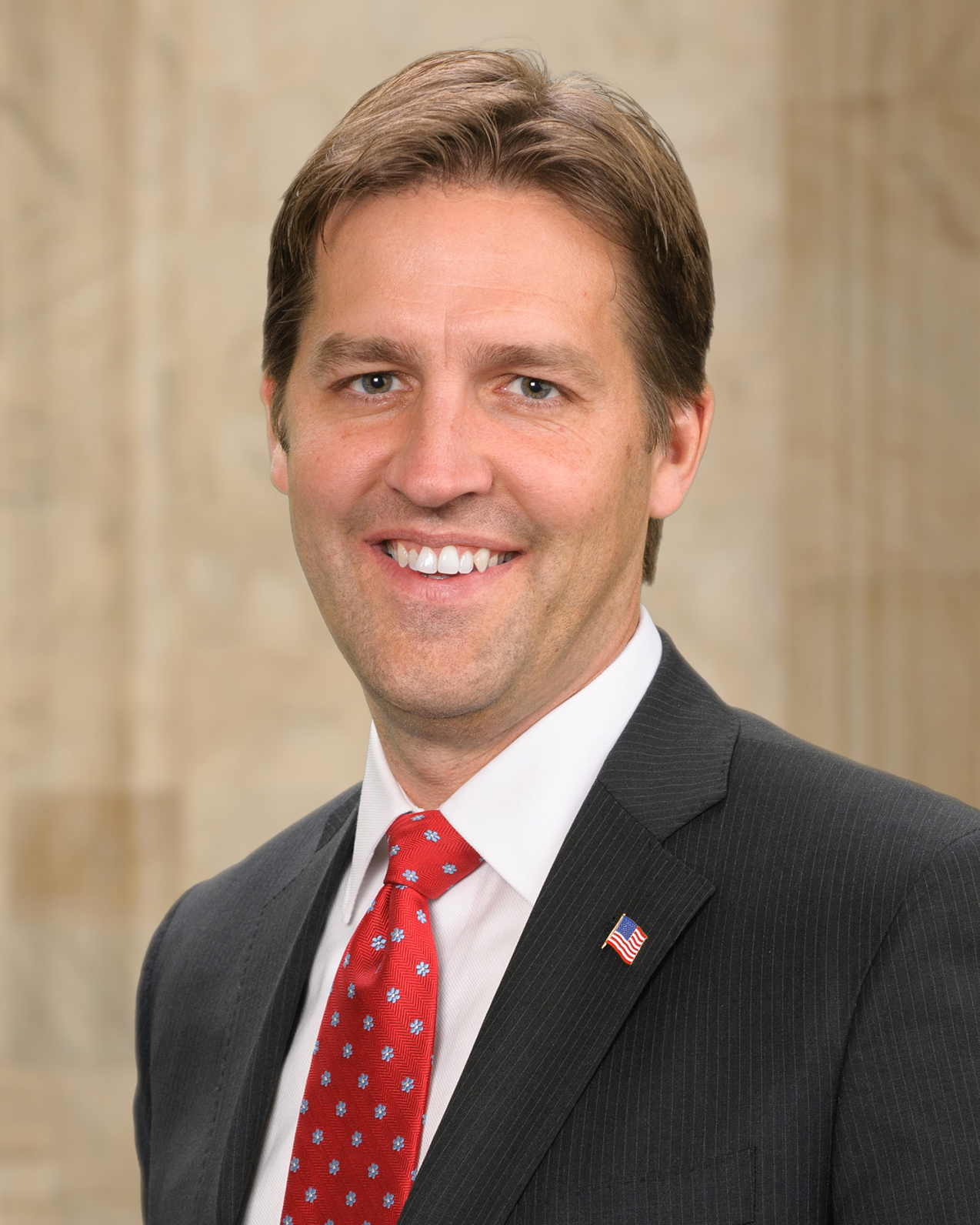

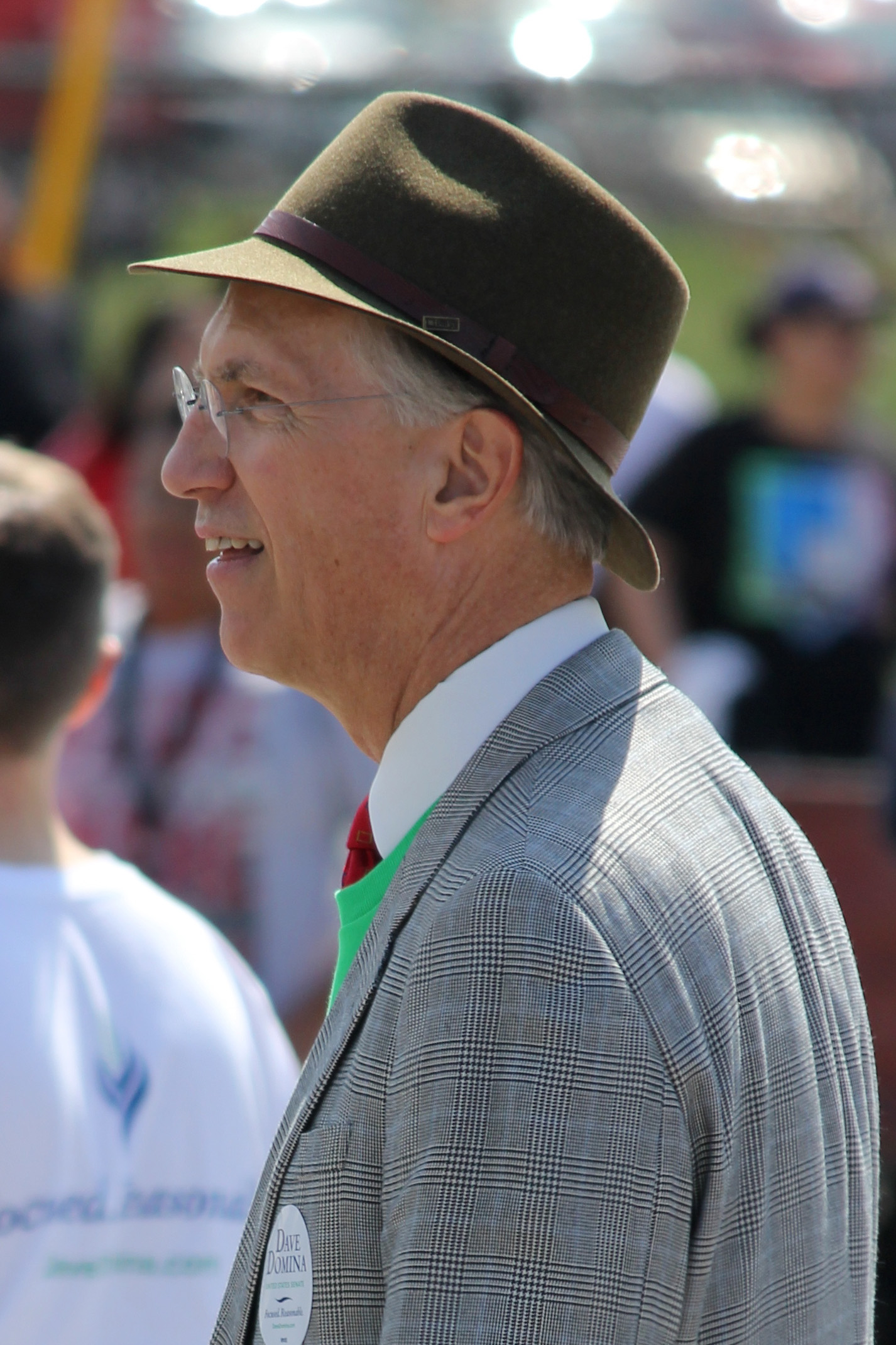
Nominee	Ben Sasse	David Domina
Party	Republican	Democratic
Popular vote	347,636	170,127
Percentage	64.5%	31.5%
- County results Sasse: 50-60% 60-70% 70-80% 80-90%
U.S. senator before election
Mike Johanns
Republican
Elected U.S. Senator
Ben Sasse
Republican

One-term incumbent Republican Mike Johanns had been elected with 58% of the vote in 2008. He did not seek a second term. Term-limited Republican Governor Dave Heineman considered running for the Republican nomination, but ultimately decided not to do so. Former state Treasurer Shane Osborn, attorney Bart McLeay, banker Sid Dinsdale, and Midland University President Ben Sasse ran for the Republican nomination. In the May 13 primary, Sasse won the Republican nomination.

Trial lawyer David Domina was the Democratic nominee.

Nebraska Republican primary election
Party	Candidate	Votes	%
Republican	Ben Sasse	109,847	49.37%
Republican	Sid Dinsdale	49,832	22.39%
Republican	Shane Osborn	46,856	21.06%
Republican	Bart McLeay	12,700	5.71%
Republican	Clifton Johnson	3,285	1.48%
Total votes		222,520	100.00%

Nebraska Democratic primary election
Party	Candidate	Votes	%
Democratic	David Domina	44,813	67.46%
Democratic	Larry Marvin	21,615	32.54%
Total votes		66,428	100.00%

Nebraska general election
Party	Candidate	Votes	%	±%
Republican	Ben Sasse	347,636	64.39%	+6.90%
Democratic	Dave Domina	170,127	31.51%	−8.60%
By Petition	Jim Jenkins	15,868	2.94%	n/a
By Petition	Todd Watson	6,260	1.16%	n/a
Majority		177,509		
Turnout		539,891		
Republican hold		Swing		

== New Hampshire ==
New Hampshire election
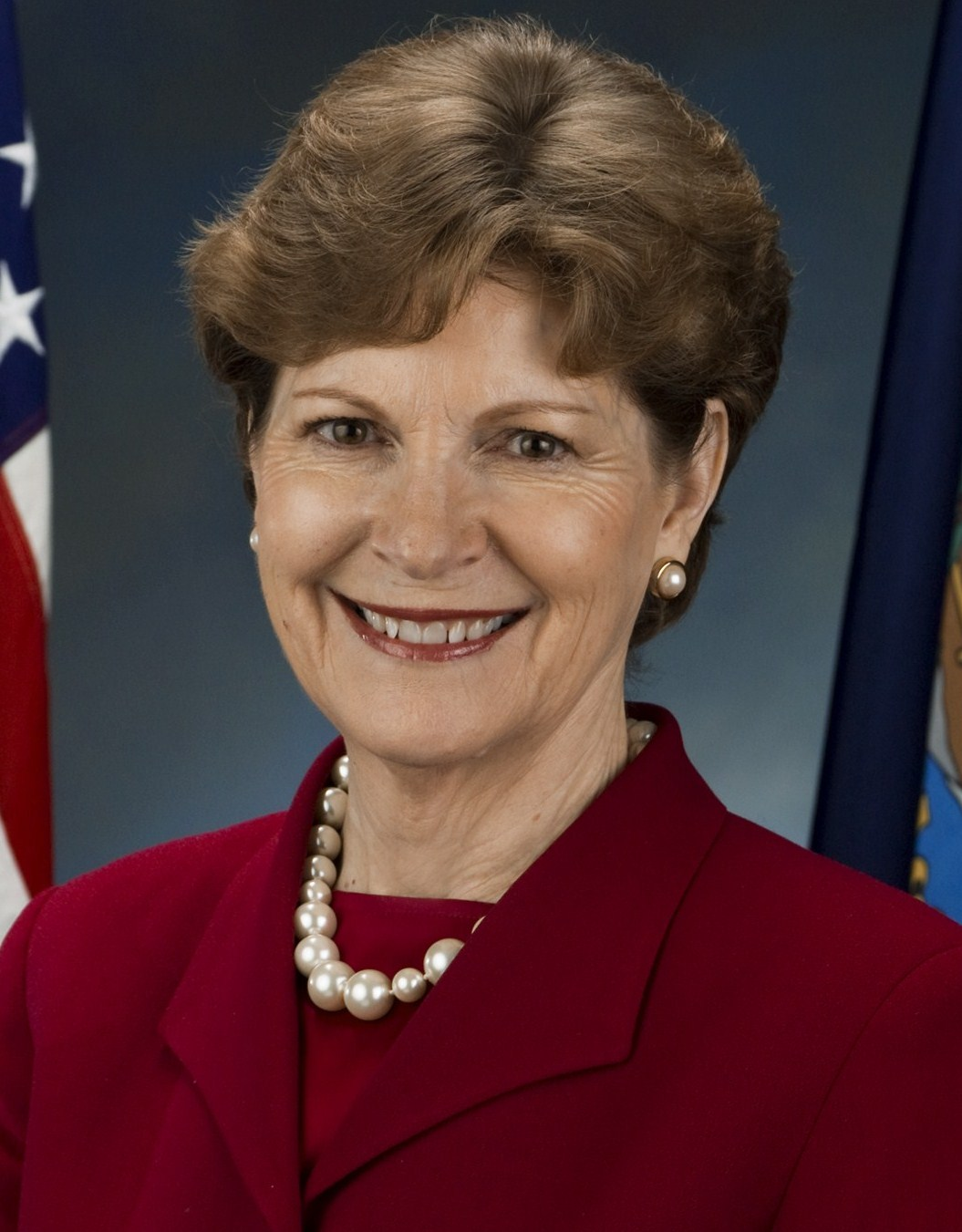

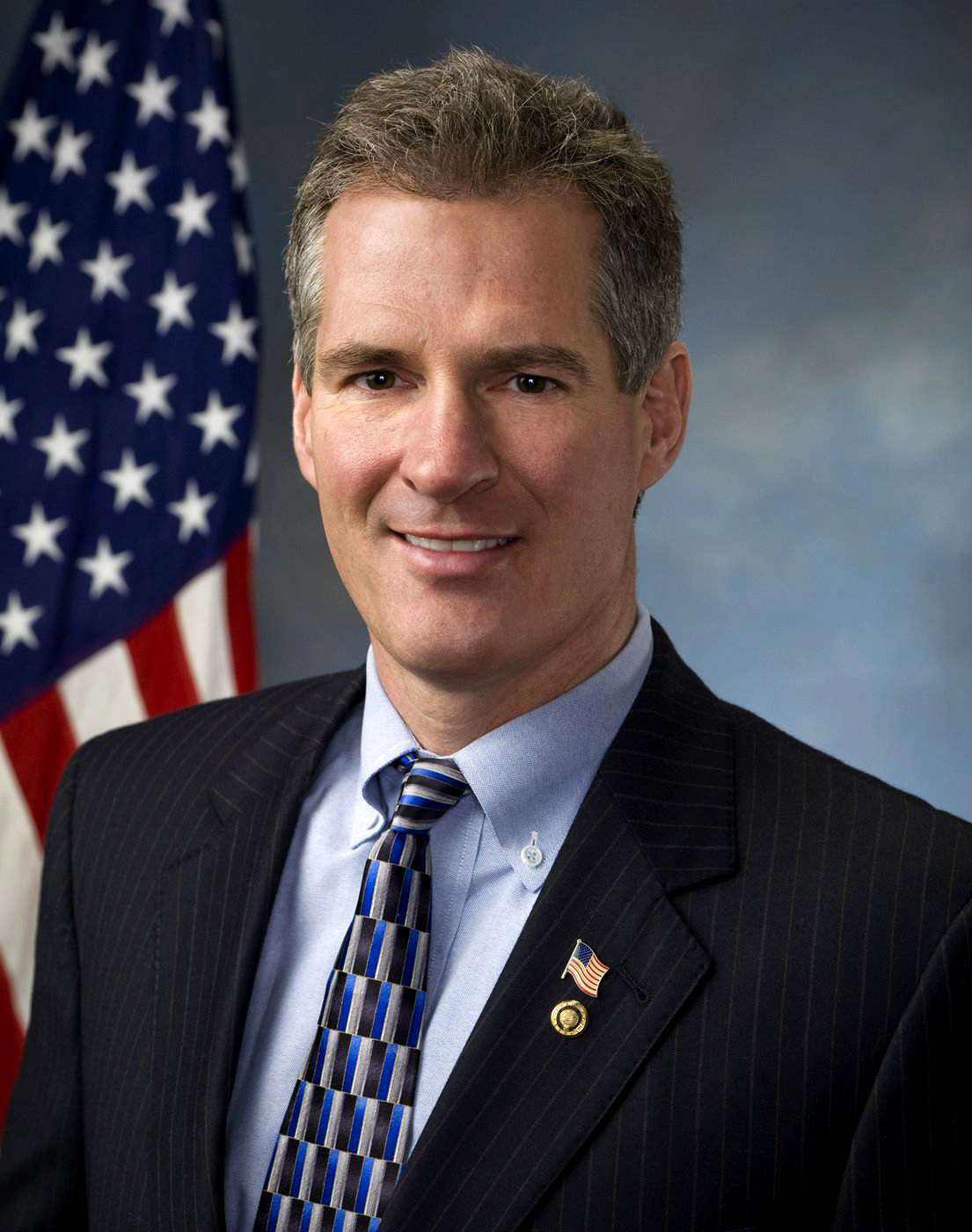
Nominee	Jeanne Shaheen	Scott Brown
Party	Democratic	Republican
Popular vote	251,184	235,347
Percentage	51.5%	48.2%
- Shaheen: 40–50% 50–60% 60–70% 70–80% 80–90% >90% Brown: 40–50% 50–60% 60–70% 70–80% >90% No Vote
U.S. senator before election
Jeanne Shaheen
Democratic
Elected U.S. Senator
Jeanne Shaheen
Democratic

One-term incumbent Democrat Jeanne Shaheen had been elected with 52% of the vote in 2008. She ran for re-election. Shaheen defeated Republican nominee Scott Brown, who had represented neighboring Massachusetts in the Senate from 2010 to 2013.

New Hampshire Democratic primary election
Party	Candidate	Votes	%
Democratic	Jeanne Shaheen (incumbent)	74,504	100.00%

New Hampshire Republican primary election
Party	Candidate	Votes	%
Republican	Scott Brown	58,775	49.86%
Republican	Jim Rubens	27,089	22.98%
Republican	Bob Smith	26,593	22.56%
Republican	Walter W. Kelly	1,376	1.17%
Republican	Bob Heghmann	784	0.67%
Republican	Andy Martin	734	0.62%
Republican	Mark W. Farnham	733	0.62%
Republican	Miroslaw "Miro" Dziedzic	508	0.43%
Republican	Gerard Beloin	492	0.42%
Republican	Robert D'Arcy	397	0.34%
Democratic	Jeanne Shaheen (write-in)	220	0.19%
	Scatter	183	0.16%
Total votes		117,884	100.00%

New Hampshire general election
Party	Candidate	Votes	%
Democratic	Jeanne Shaheen (incumbent)	251,184	51.46%
Republican	Scott Brown	235,347	48.21%
None	Scatter	1,628	0.33%
Total votes		488,159	100.00%
Democratic hold			

== New Jersey ==
New Jersey election
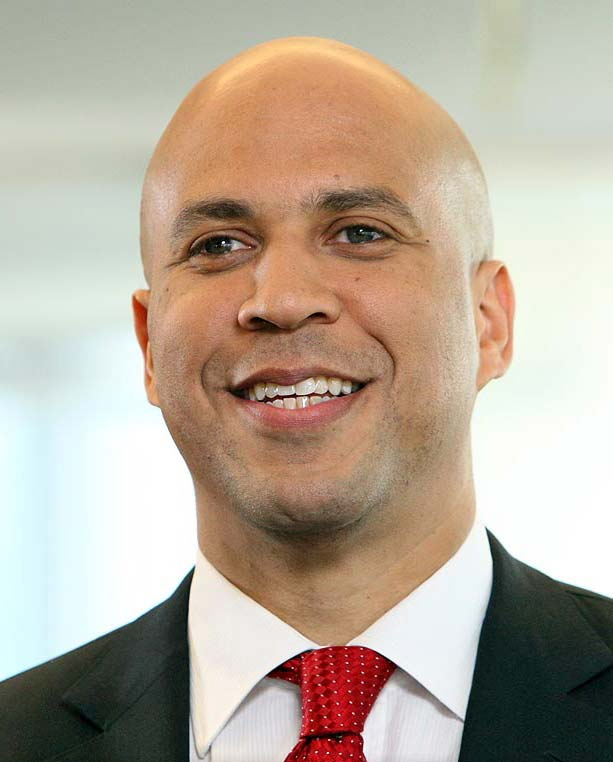

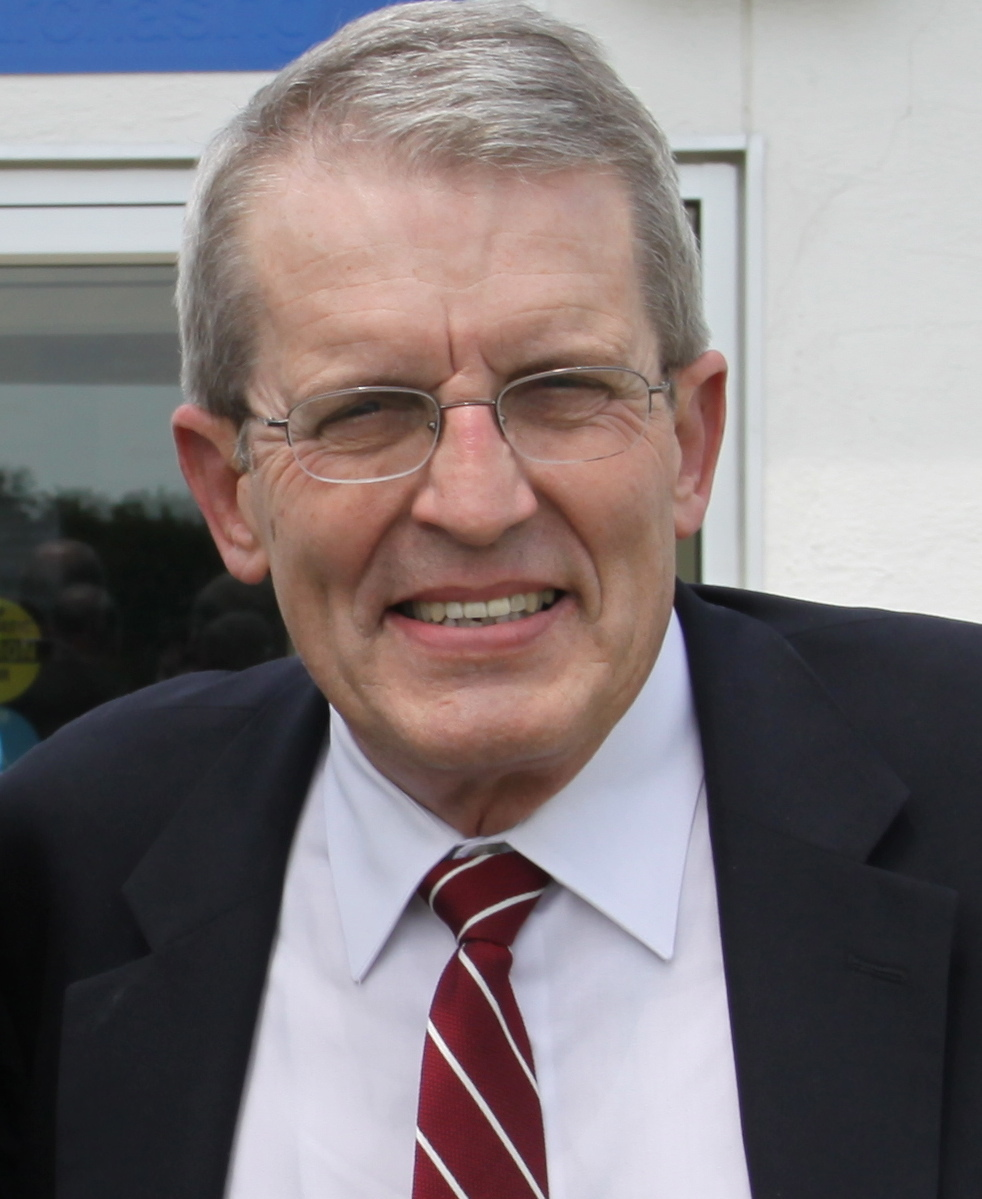
Nominee	Cory Booker	Jeff Bell
Party	Democratic	Republican
Popular vote	1,043,866	791,297
Percentage	55.8%	42.3%
- Booker: 40–50% 50–60% 60–70% 70–80% 80–90% >90% Bell: 40–50% 50–60% 60–70% 70–80% 80–90%
U.S. senator before election
Cory Booker
Democratic
Elected U.S. Senator
Cory Booker
Democratic

Incumbent Democrat Frank Lautenberg had been re-elected with 56% of the vote in 2008. After announcing he would not seek re-election, Lautenberg died in June 2013, aged 89, after a long period of ill health.

Newark Mayor Cory Booker, a Democrat, defeated Republican nominee Steve Lonegan by 55%-to-45% in a 2013 special election to replace interim Republican appointee Jeffrey Chiesa. Booker ran for re-election to a full term in 2014. 1978 and 1982 Republican candidate and political operative Jeff Bell was the Republican nominee.

New Jersey Democratic primary election
Party	Candidate	Votes	%
Democratic	Cory Booker (incumbent)	197,158	100.00%
Total votes		197,158	100.00%

New Jersey Republican primary election
Party	Candidate	Votes	%
Republican	Jeff Bell	42,728	29.41%
Republican	Richard J. Pezzullo	38,130	26.24%
Republican	Brian D. Goldberg	36,266	24.96%
Republican	Murray Sabrin	28,183	19.40%
Total votes		145,307	100.00%

New Jersey general election
Party	Candidate	Votes	%
Democratic	Cory Booker (incumbent)	1,043,866	55.84%
Republican	Jeff Bell	791,297	42.33%
Libertarian	Joseph Baratelli	16,721	0.89%
Economic Growth	Hank Schroeder	5,704	0.31%
Independent	Jeff Boss	4,513	0.24%
Democratic-Republican	Eugene Martin Lavergne	3,890	0.21%
Independent	Antonio N. Sabas	3,544	0.19%
Total votes		1,869,535	100.00%
Democratic hold			

== New Mexico ==
New Mexico election
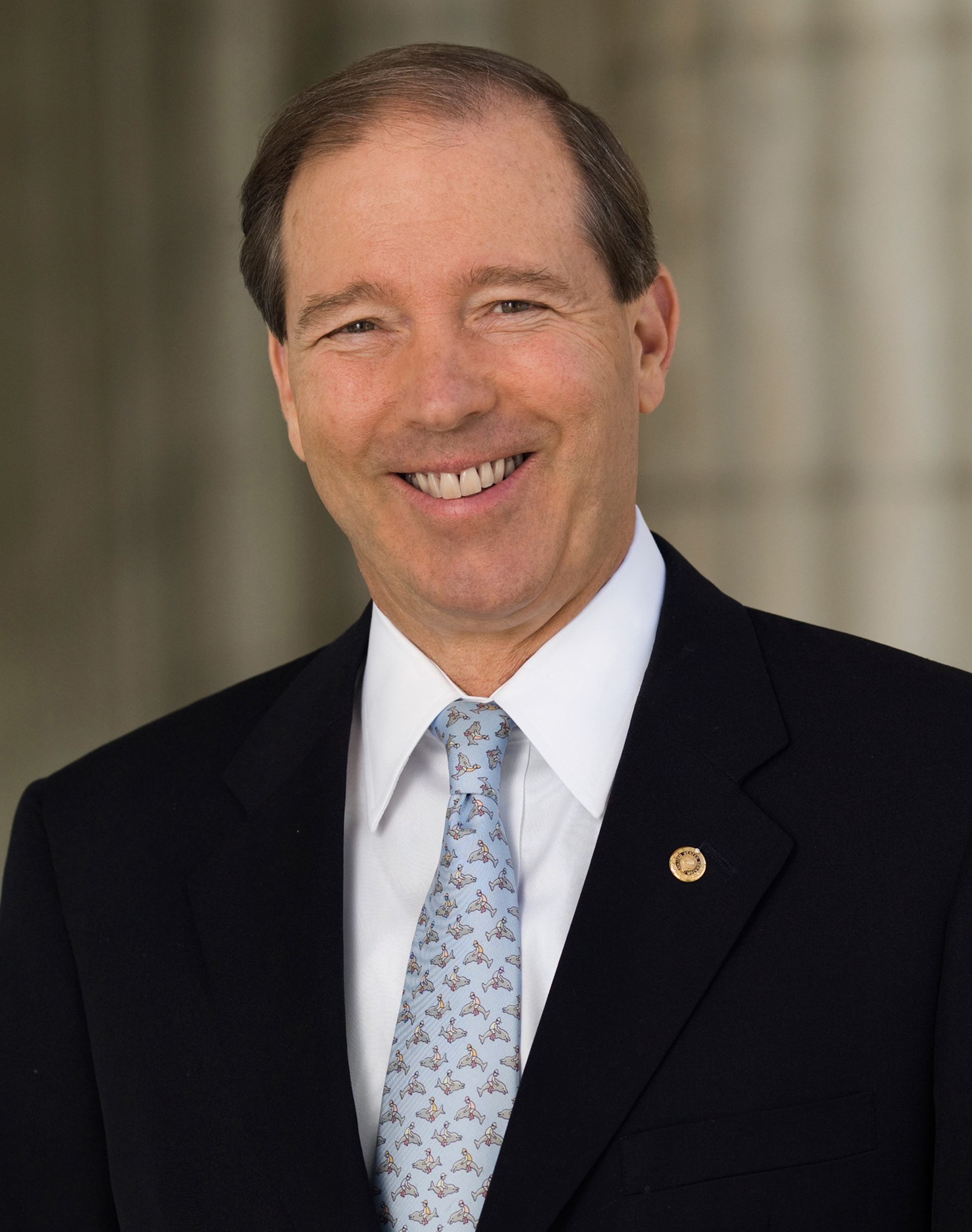

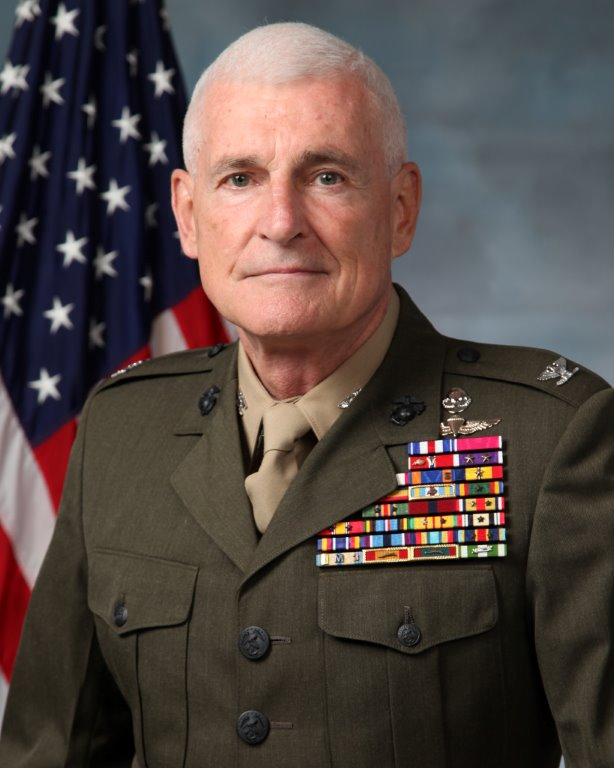
Nominee	Tom Udall	Allen Weh
Party	Democratic	Republican
Popular vote	286,409	229,097
Percentage	55.6%	44.4%
- Udall: 50–60% 60–70% 70–80% 80–90% Weh: 50–60% 60–70% 70–80%
U.S. senator before election
Tom Udall
Democratic
Elected U.S. Senator
Tom Udall
Democratic

One-term incumbent Democrat Tom Udall had been elected with 61% of the vote in 2008. Former Doña Ana County Republican Party Chairman David Clements and former New Mexico Republican Party Chairman Allen Weh sought the Republican nomination. Weh won the June 3 primary but lost to Udall in the general election.

New Mexico Democratic primary election
Party	Candidate	Votes	%
Democratic	Tom Udall (incumbent)	113,502	100.00%
Total votes		113,502	100.00%

New Mexico Republican primary election
Party	Candidate	Votes	%
Republican	Allen Weh	41,566	63.0%
Republican	David Clements	24,413	37.0%
Total votes		65,979	100.0%

New Mexico general election
Party	Candidate	Votes	%
Democratic	Tom Udall (incumbent)	286,409	55.56%
Republican	Allen Weh	229,097	44.44%
Total votes		515,506	100.00%
Democratic hold			

== North Carolina ==
North Carolina election
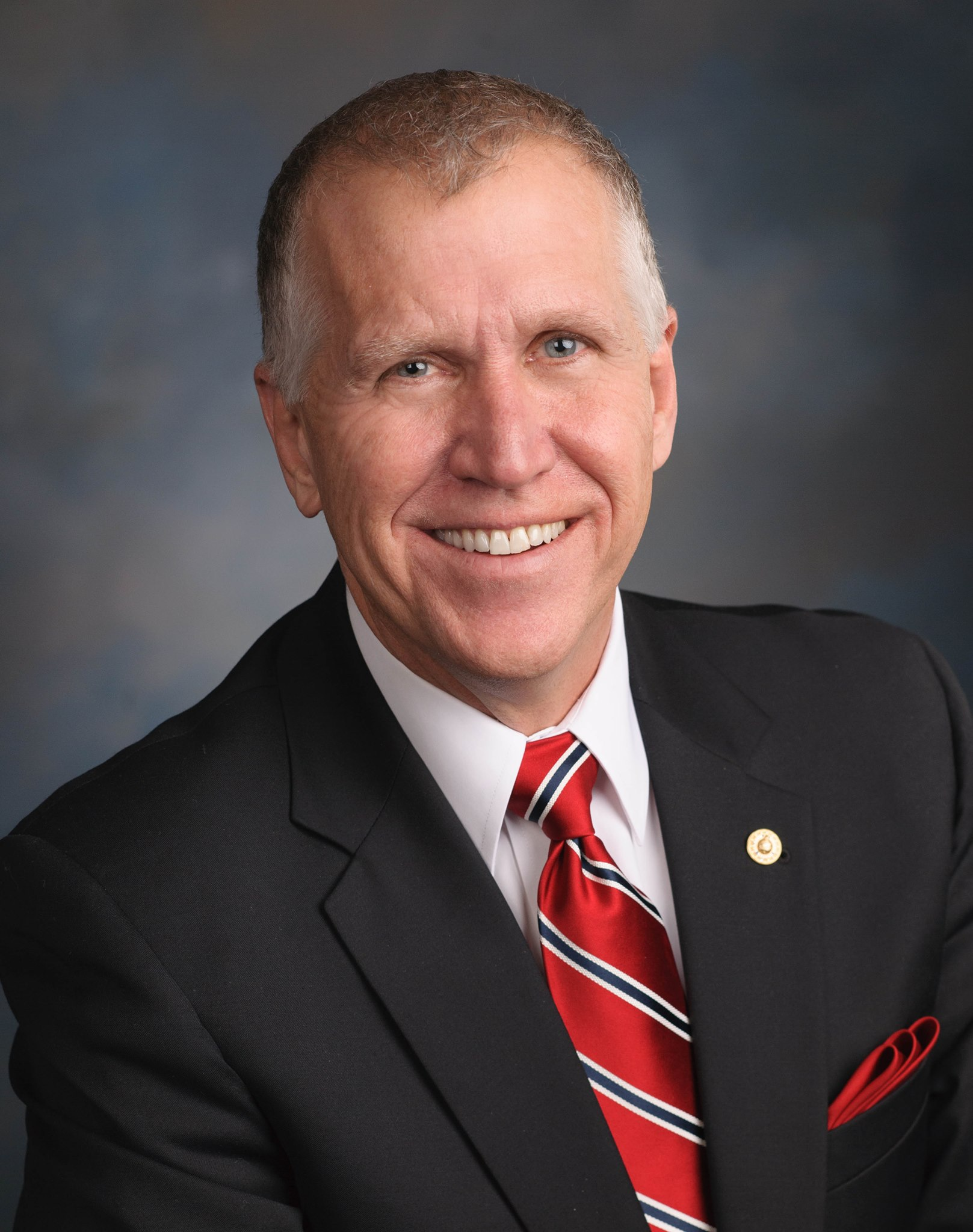

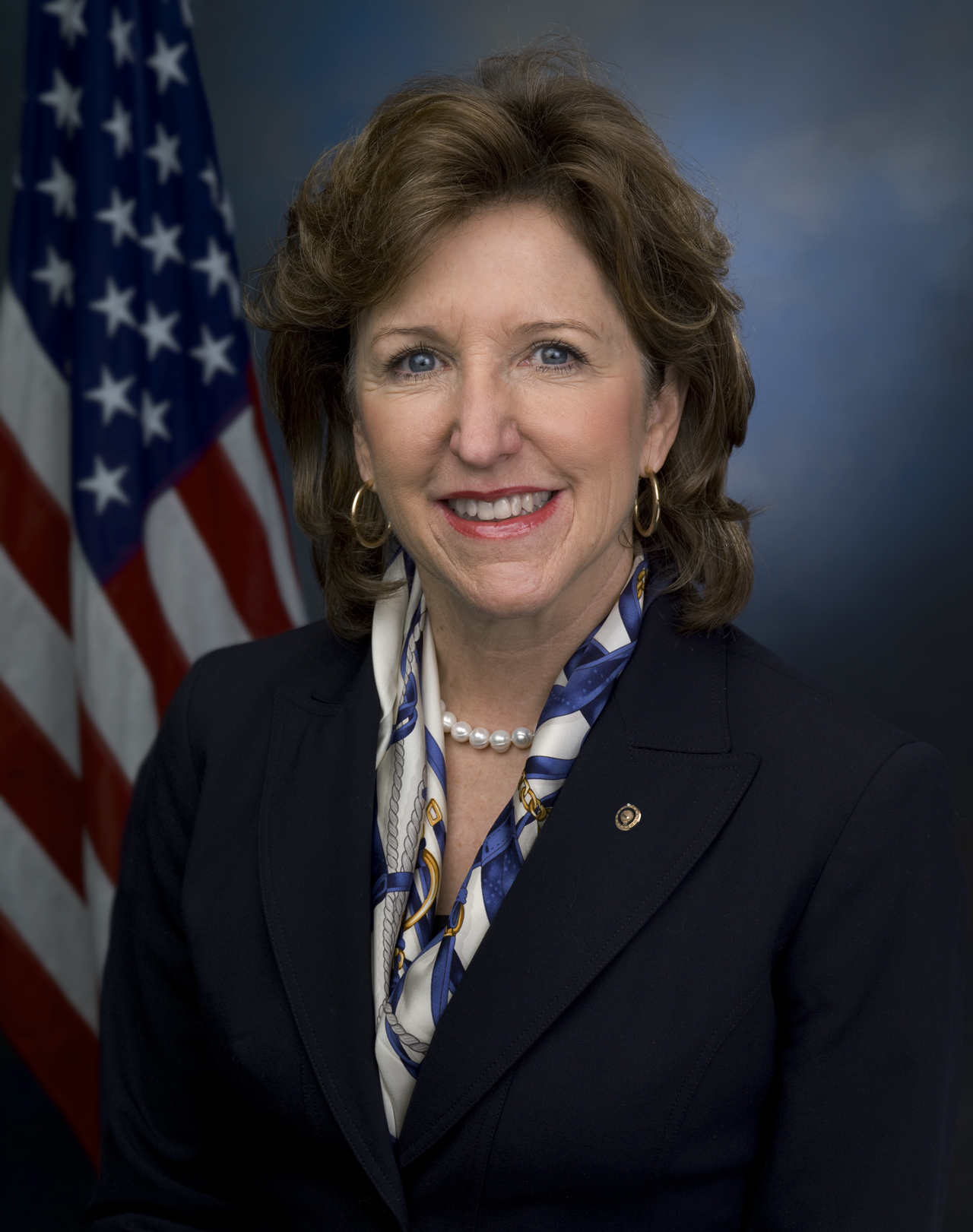
Nominee	Thom Tillis	Kay Hagan
Party	Republican	Democratic
Popular vote	1,423,259	1,377,651
Percentage	48.8%	47.3%
- Tillis: 40–50% 50–60% 60–70% 70–80% Hagan: 40–50% 50–60% 60–70% 70–80%
U.S. senator before election
Kay Hagan
Democratic
Elected U.S. Senator
Thom Tillis
Republican

One-term incumbent Democrat Kay Hagan had been elected with 53% of the vote against incumbent Republican Elizabeth Dole in 2008. Hagan was seeking re-election.

State House Speaker Thom Tillis was the Republican nominee. Sean Haugh won the Libertarian nomination.

North Carolina Democratic primary election
Party	Candidate	Votes	%
Democratic	Kay Hagan (incumbent)	372,209	77.16%
Democratic	Will Stewart	66,903	13.87%
Democratic	Ernest T. Reeves	43,257	8.97%
Total votes		482,579	100.00%

North Carolina Republican primary election
Party	Candidate	Votes	%
Republican	Thom Tillis	223,174	45.68%
Republican	Greg Brannon	132,630	27.15%
Republican	Mark Harris	85,727	17.55%
Republican	Heather Grant	22,971	4.70%
Republican	Jim Snyder	9,414	1.93%
Republican	Ted Alexander	9,258	1.89%
Republican	Alex Lee Bradshaw	3,528	0.72%
Republican	Edward Kryn	1,853	0.38%
Total votes		488,555	100.00%

North Carolina Libertarian primary election
Party	Candidate	Votes	%
Libertarian	Sean Haugh	1,226	60.69%
Libertarian	Tim D'Annunzio	794	39.31%
Total votes		2,020	100.00%

North Carolina general election
Party	Candidate	Votes	%	±%
Republican	Thom Tillis	1,423,259	48.82%	+4.64%
Democratic	Kay Hagan (incumbent)	1,377,651	47.26%	−5.39%
Libertarian	Sean Haugh	109,100	3.74%	+0.62%
Other	Write-ins	5,271	0.18%	+0.14%
Plurality		45,608	1.56%	
Turnout		2,915,281	+5.0%	
Republican gain from Democratic		Swing		

== Oklahoma ==
There were two elections in Oklahoma, due to the resignation of Tom Coburn.

=== Oklahoma (regular) ===
Oklahoma general election
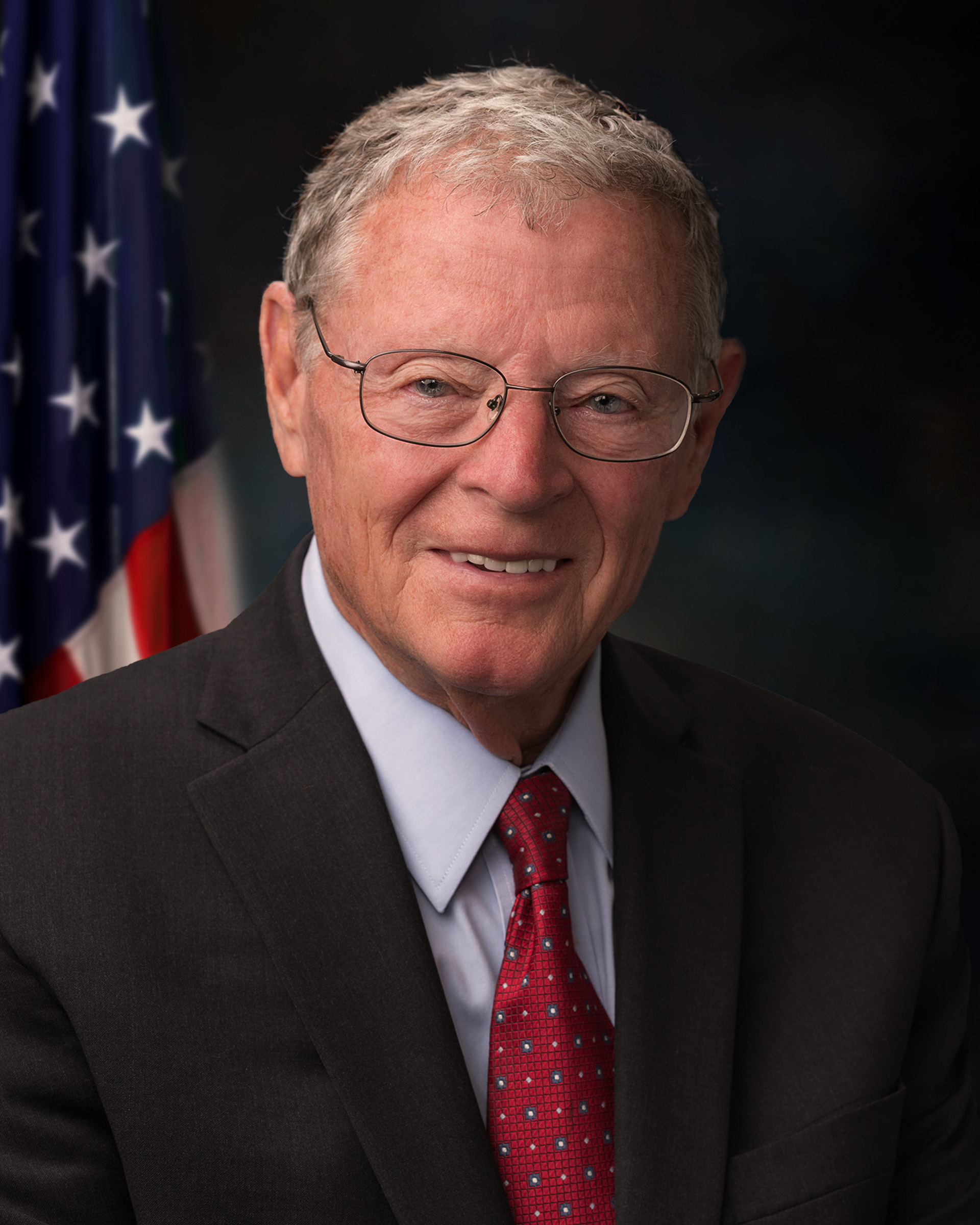

Nominee	Jim Inhofe	Matt Silverstein
Party	Republican	Democratic
Popular vote	558,166	234,307
Percentage	68.01%	28.55%
- County results Inhofe: 50–60% 60–70% 70–80% 80–90% >90%
U.S. senator before election
Jim Inhofe
Republican
Elected U.S. Senator
Jim Inhofe
Republican

Three-term incumbent Republican Jim Inhofe had been re-elected with 57% of the vote in 2008. Inhofe sought re-election. Matt Silverstein, an insurance agency owner, ran for the Democratic nomination.

Oklahoma Republican primary election
Party	Candidate	Votes	%
Republican	Jim Inhofe (incumbent)	231,291	87.69%
Republican	Evelyn Rodgers	11,960	4.53%
Republican	Erick Wyatt	11,713	4.44%
Republican	Rob Moye	4,846	1.84%
Republican	D. Jean McBride-Samuels	3,965	1.50%
Total votes		263,775	100.00%

Oklahoma U.S. Senate election, 2014
Party	Candidate	Votes	%
Republican	Jim Inhofe (incumbent)	558,166	68.01%
Democratic	Matt Silverstein	234,307	28.55%
Independent	Joan Farr	10,554	1.29%
Independent	Ray Woods	9,913	1.21%
Independent	Aaron DeLozier	7,793	0.94%
Total votes		820,733	100.00%
Republican hold			

=== Oklahoma (special) ===
Oklahoma special election
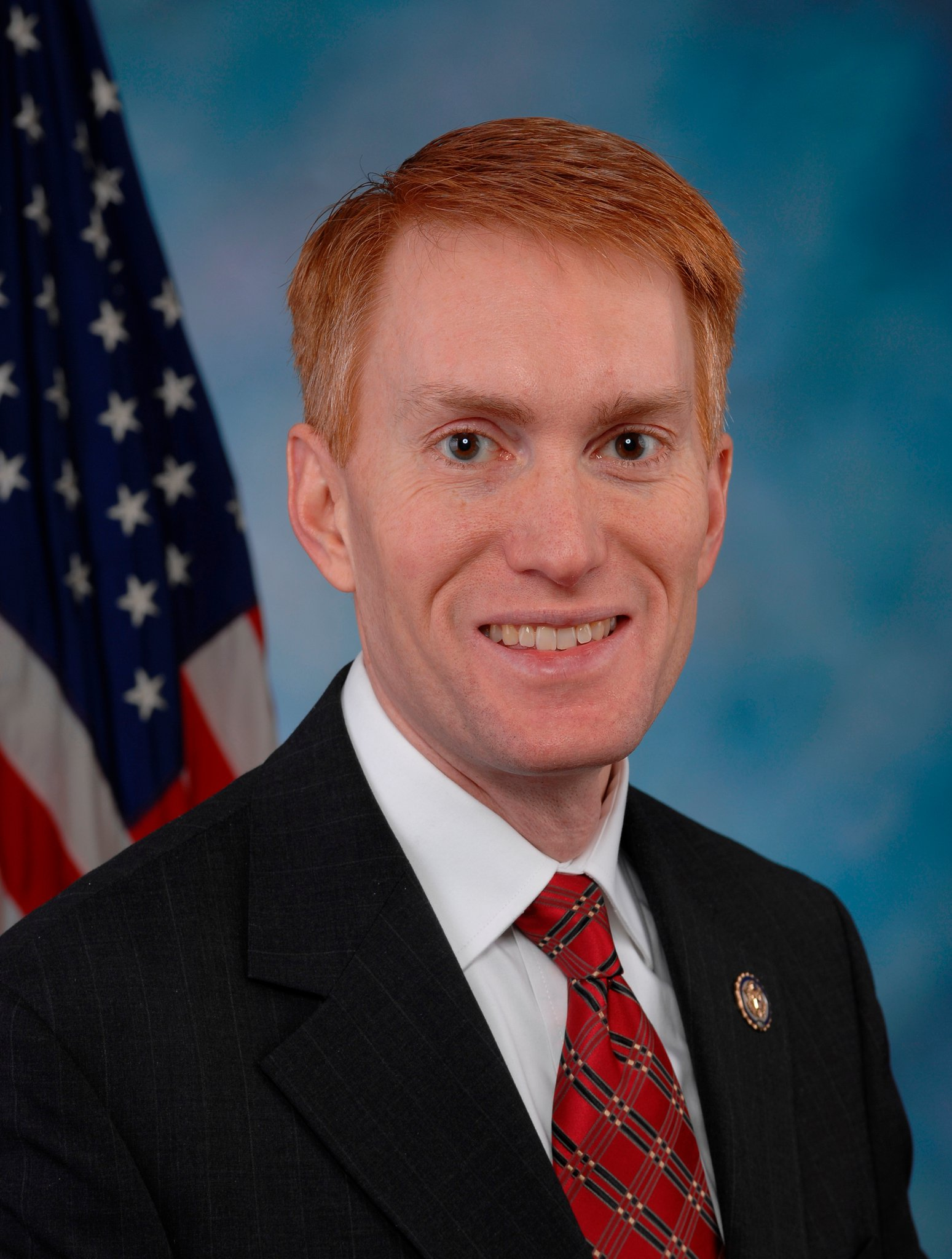

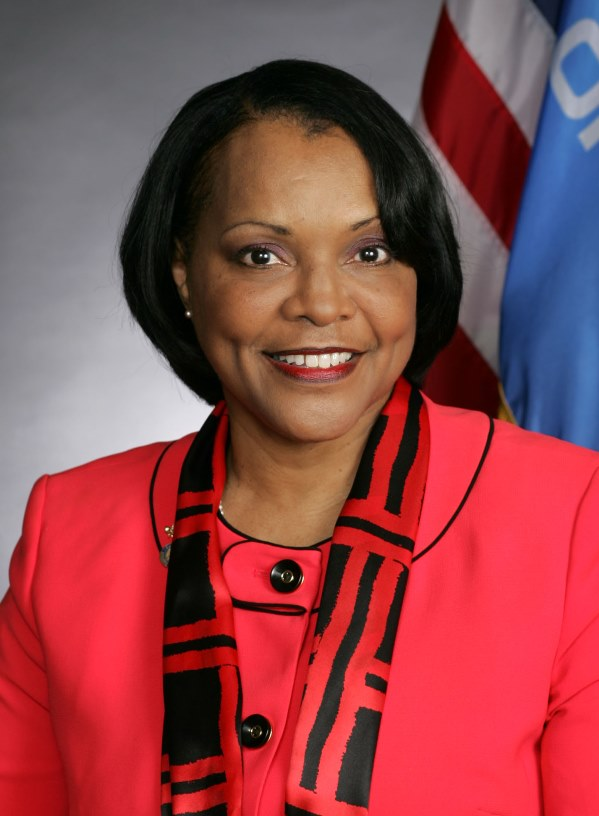
Nominee	James Lankford	Connie Johnson
Party	Republican	Democratic
Popular vote	557,002	237,923
Percentage	67.9%	29.0%
- Country results Lankford: 50–60% 60–70% 70–80% 80–90%
U.S. senator before election
Tom Coburn
Republican
Elected U.S. Senator
James Lankford
Republican

Two-term incumbent Republican Tom Coburn had been re-elected with 71% of the vote in 2010, and was not scheduled to be up for election again until 2016. However, Coburn announced his intention to resign at the end of the 113th Congress. A special election to fill his seat took place in November 2014, concurrent with the other Senate elections. Congressman James Lankford was the Republican nominee. State Senator Connie Johnson was the Democratic nominee.

Oklahoma Republican primary election
Party	Candidate	Votes	%
Republican	James Lankford	152,749	57.24%
Republican	T.W. Shannon	91,854	34.42%
Republican	Randy Brogdon	12,934	4.85%
Republican	Kevin Crow	2,828	1.06%
Republican	Andy Craig	2,427	0.91%
Republican	Eric McCray	2,272	0.85%
Republican	Jason Weger	1,794	0.67%
Total votes		266,858	100.00%

Oklahoma Democratic primary election
Party	Candidate	Votes	%
Democratic	Constance N. Johnson	71,462	43.84%
Democratic	Jim Rogers	57,598	35.34%
Democratic	Patrick Hayes	33,943	20.82%
Total votes		163,003	100.00%

Oklahoma Democratic primary runoff election
Party	Candidate	Votes	%
Democratic	Constance N. Johnson	54,762	57.99%
Democratic	Jim Rogers	39,664	42.01%
Total votes		94,426	100.00%

Oklahoma special election
Party	Candidate	Votes	%
Republican	James Lankford	557,002	67.85%
Democratic	Connie Johnson	237,923	28.98%
Independent	Mark T. Beard	25,965	3.17%
Total votes		820,890	100.00%
Republican hold			

== Oregon ==
Oregon election
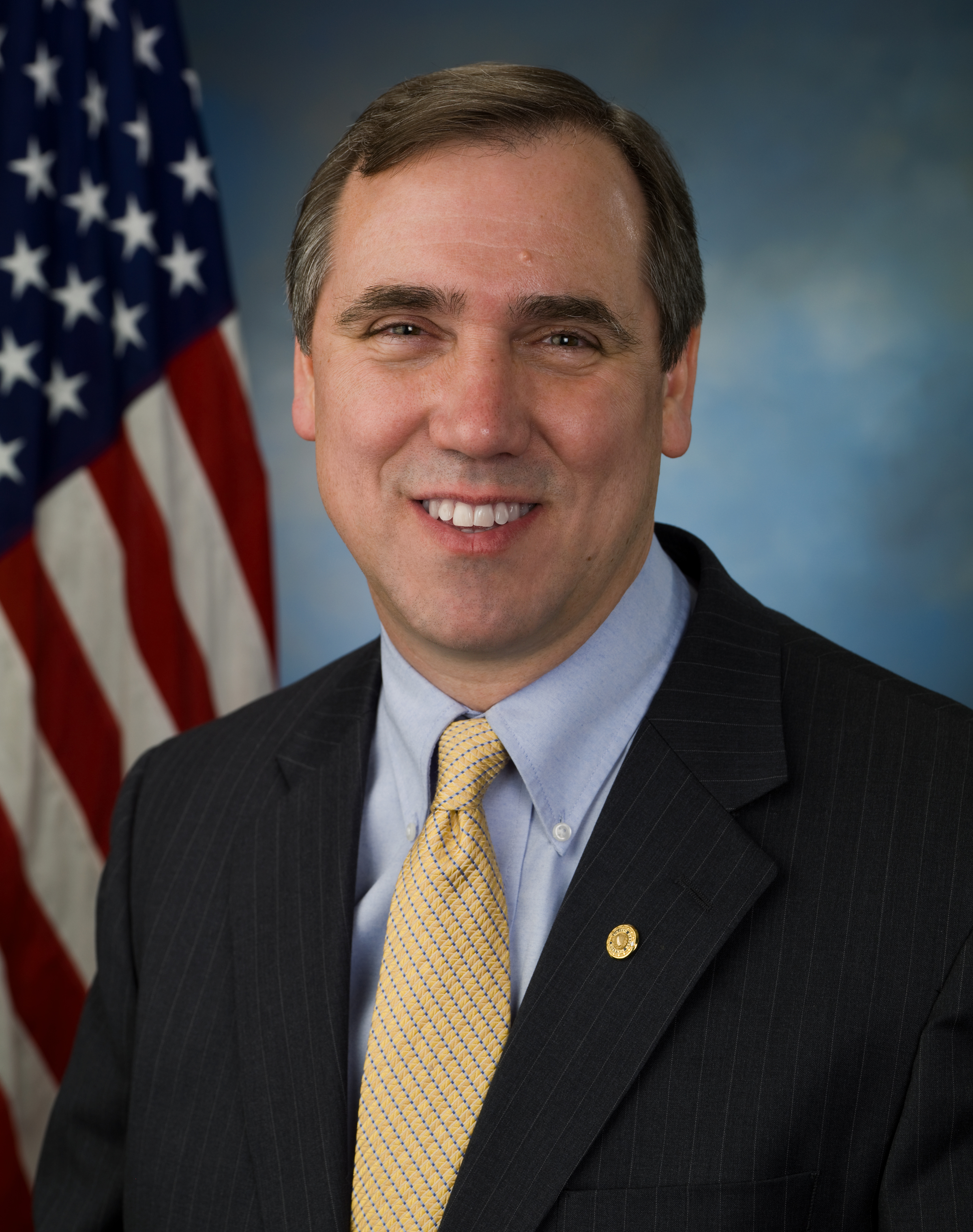

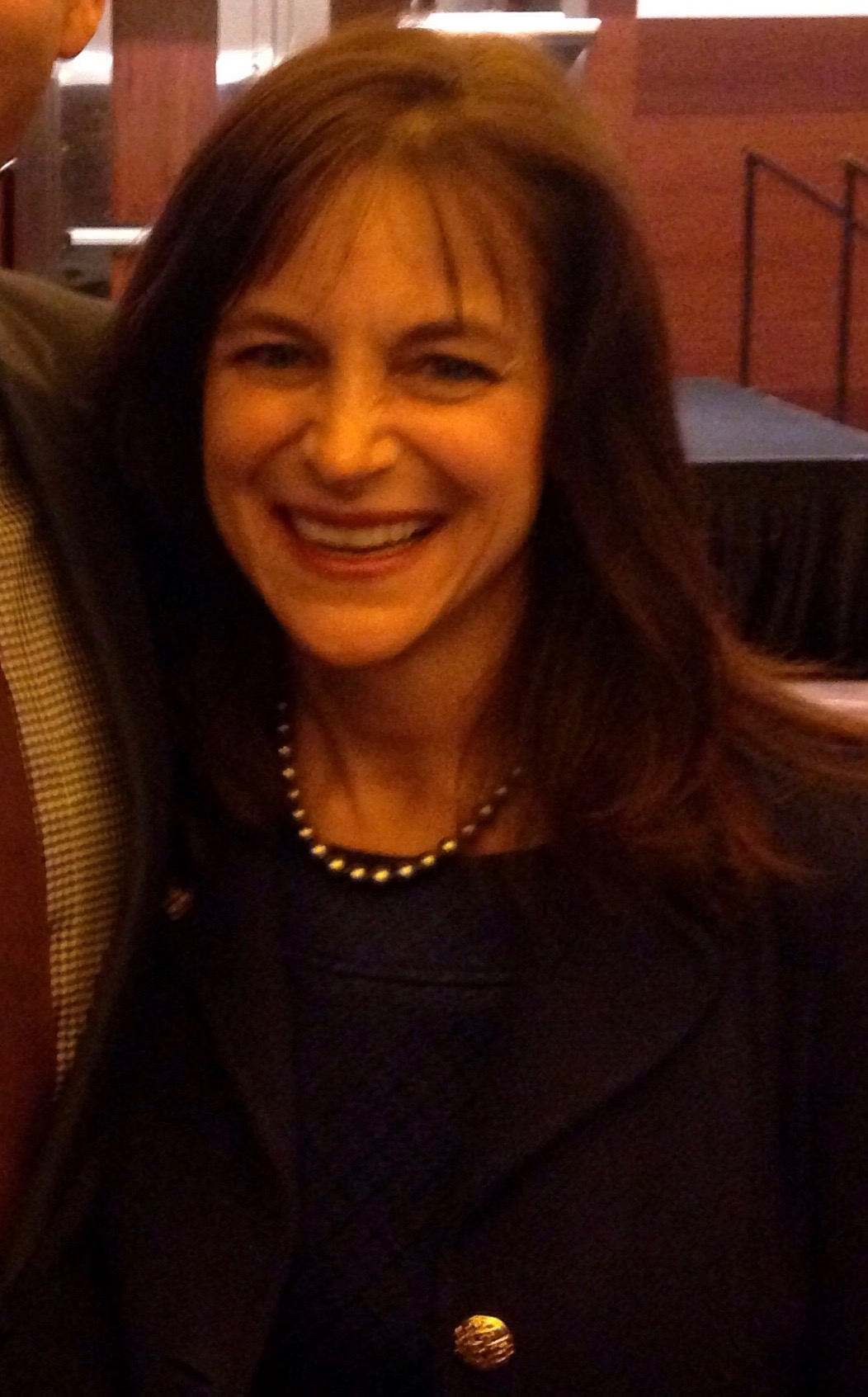
Nominee	Jeff Merkley	Monica Wehby
Party	Democratic	Republican
Popular vote	814,537	538,847
Percentage	55.7%	36.9%
- County results Merkley: 40–50% 50–60% 60–70% 70–80% Wehby: 40–50% 50–60% 60–70%
U.S. senator before election
Jeff Merkley
Democratic
Elected U.S. Senator
Jeff Merkley
Democratic

One-term incumbent Democrat Jeff Merkley was narrowly elected with 49% of the vote in 2008. Merkley was running for a second term. State representative Jason Conger, attorney Tim Crawley, IT consultant Mark Callahan, neurosurgeon Dr. Monica Wehby, and former Linn County Republican Chair Jo Rae Perkins all ran for the Republican nomination, with Wehby ultimately winning the nomination in the May 20 primary.

Oregon Democratic primary election
Party	Candidate	Votes	%
Democratic	Jeff Merkley (incumbent)	277,120	92.04%
Democratic	William Bryk	11,330	3.76%
Democratic	Pavel Goberman	8,436	2.81%
	write-ins	4,194	1.39%
Total votes		301,080	100.00%

Oregon Republican primary election
Party	Candidate	Votes	%
Republican	Monica Wehby	134,627	49.96%
Republican	Jason Conger	101,401	37.63%
Republican	Mark Callahan	18,220	6.76%
Republican	Jo Rae Perkins	7,602	2.82%
Republican	Tim Crawley	6,566	2.44%
	write-ins	1,027	0.39%
Total votes		266,438	100.00%

Oregon general election
Party	Candidate	Votes	%
Democratic	Jeff Merkley (incumbent)	814,537	55.72%
Republican	Monica Wehby	538,847	36.87%
Libertarian	Mike Monchalin	44,916	3.07%
Pacific Green	Christina Jean Lugo	32,434	2.22%
Constitution	James E. Leuenberger	24,212	1.66%
	write-ins	6,672	0.46%
Total votes		1,461,618	100.00%
Democratic hold		Swing	

== Rhode Island ==
Rhode Island election
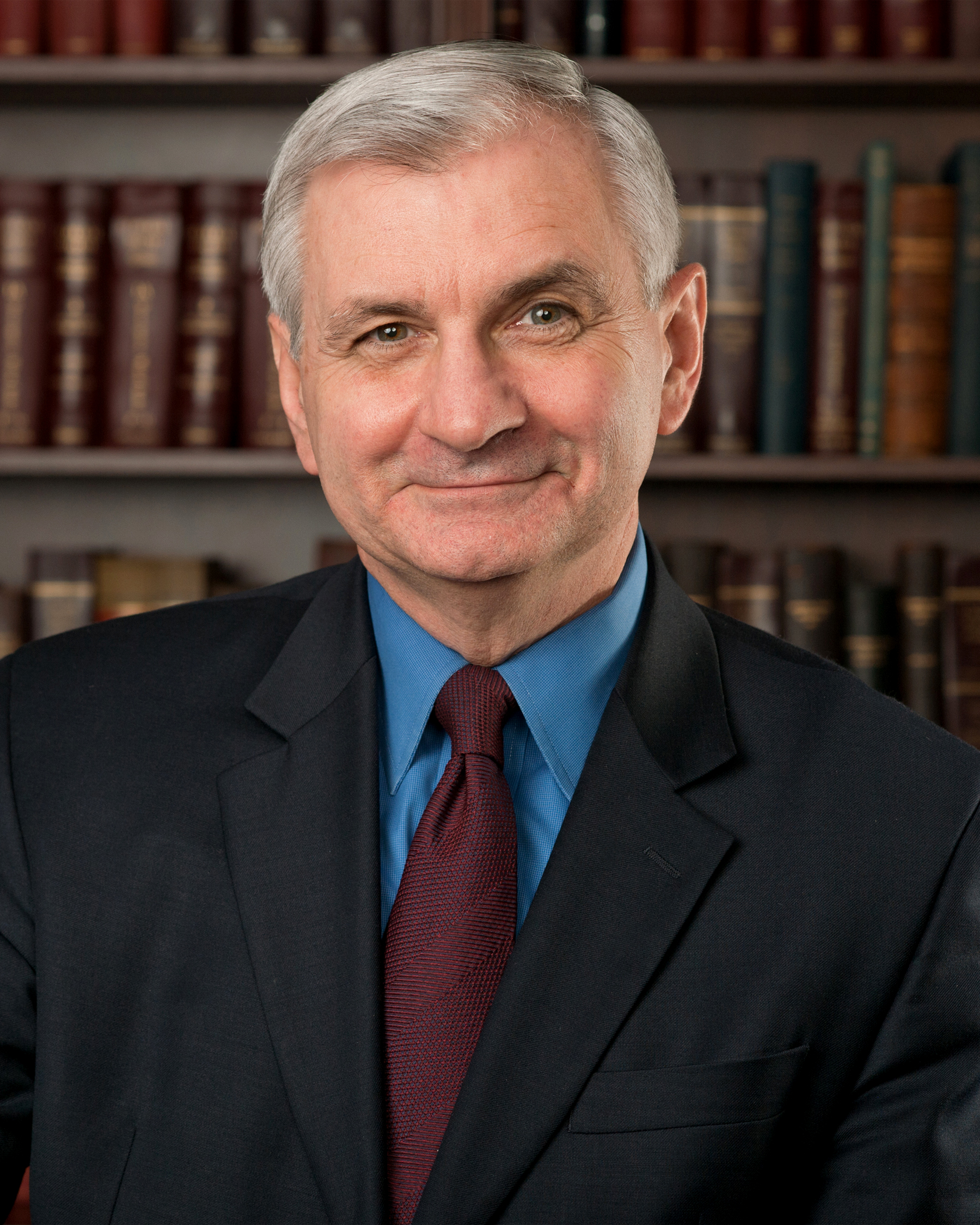

Nominee	Jack Reed	Mark Zaccaria
Party	Democratic	Republican
Popular vote	223,675	92,684
Percentage	70.6%	29.2%
- Reed: 50–60% 60–70% 70–80% 80–90%
U.S. senator before election
Jack Reed
Democratic
Elected U.S. Senator
Jack Reed
Democratic

Three-term incumbent Democrat Jack Reed had been re-elected with 73% of the vote in 2008. Reed defeated Republican nominee Mark Zaccaria in the 2014 election.

Rhode Island Democratic primary election
Party	Candidate	Votes	%
Democratic	Jack Reed	98,610	100.00%

Rhode Island Republican primary election
Party	Candidate	Votes	%
Republican	Mark Zaccaria	23,780	100.00%

Rhode Island general election
Party	Candidate	Votes	%	±%
Democratic	Jack Reed (incumbent)	223,675	70.6%	−2.5%
Republican	Mark Zaccaria	92,684	29.2%	+2.7%
	write-ins	539	0.2%	
Majority		130,991		
Turnout		316,898		
Democratic hold		Swing	-5.3%	

== South Carolina ==
There were two elections in South Carolina, due to the resignation of Jim DeMint.

=== South Carolina (regular) ===
South Carolina general election
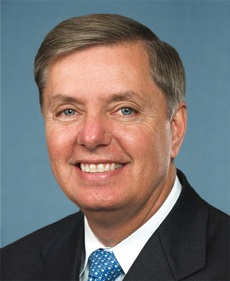
Nominee	Lindsey Graham	Brad Hutto
Party	Republican	Democratic
Popular vote	672,942	480,933
Percentage	55.3%	38.8%
- County results Graham: 40–50% 50–60% 60–70% 70–80% Hutto: 40–50% 50–60% 60–70% 70–80%
U.S. senator before election
Lindsey Graham
Republican
Elected U.S. senator
Lindsey Graham
Republican

Two-term Republican Lindsey Graham had been re-elected with 58% of the vote in 2008. Graham won the Republican nomination over a field that included State Senator Lee Bright. State Senator Brad Hutto won the Democratic nomination.

South Carolina Republican primary election
Party	Candidate	Votes	%
Republican	Lindsey Graham (incumbent)	178,833	56.42%
Republican	Lee Bright	48,904	15.53%
Republican	Richard Cash	26,325	8.30%
Republican	Det Bowers	23,172	7.31%
Republican	Nancy Mace	19,634	6.19%
Republican	Bill Connor	16,912	5.34%
Republican	Benjamin Dunn	3,209	1.01%
Total votes		316,989	100.00%

South Carolina Democratic primary election
Party	Candidate	Votes	%
Democratic	Brad Hutto	87,552	76.65%
Democratic	Jay Stamper	26,678	23.35%
Total votes		114,230	100.00%

South Carolina general election
Party	Candidate	Votes	%	±%
Republican	Lindsey Graham (incumbent)	672,941	54.27%	−3.25%
Democratic	Brad Hutto	456,726	36.83%	−5.42%
Working Families	Brad Hutto	24,207	1.95%	+1.95%
Independent	Thomas Ravenel	47,588	3.84%	+3.84%
Libertarian	Victor Kocher	33,839	2.73%	+2.73%
	Write-ins	4,774	0.38%	+0.15%
Majority		192,008	15.49%	+0.22%
Turnout		1,240,075	43.04%	−30.24%
Republican hold		Swing		

=== South Carolina (special) ===
South Carolina special election
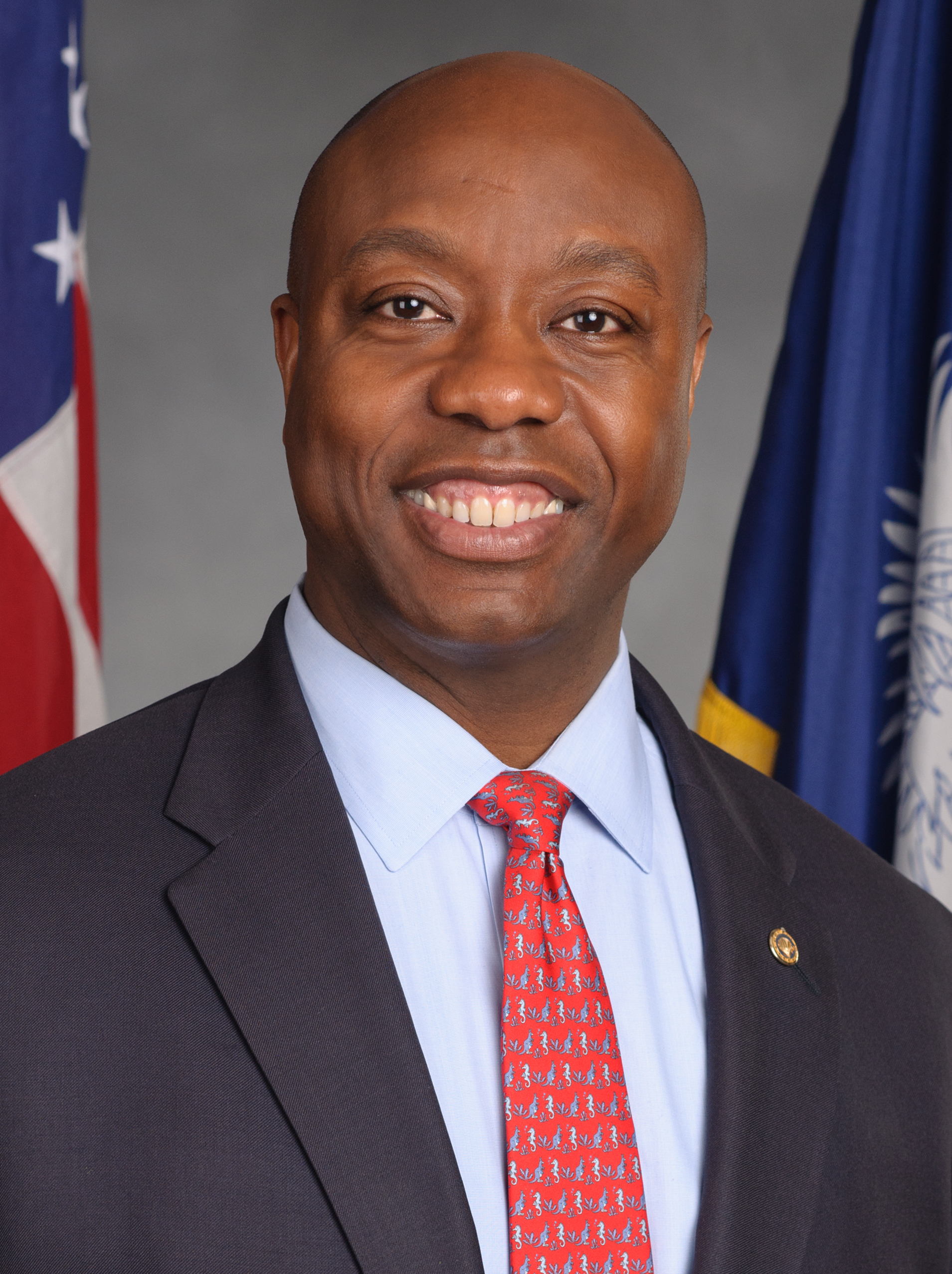

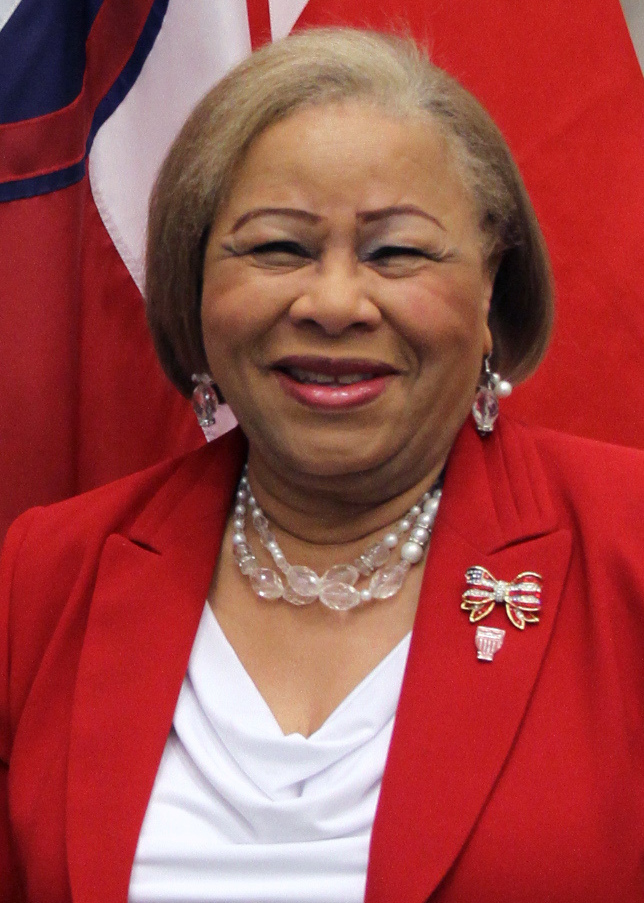
Nominee	Tim Scott	Joyce Dickerson
Party	Republican	Democratic
Popular vote	757,215	459,583
Percentage	61.1%	37.1%
- County results Scott: 40–50% 50–60% 60–70% 70–80% 80–90% Dickerson: 50–60% 60–70% 70–80%
U.S. senator before election
Tim Scott
Republican
Elected U.S. senator
Tim Scott
Republican

Jim DeMint had been elected to a second term in 2010, but resigned from the Senate in January 2013 to become president of The Heritage Foundation, a conservative think-tank. Governor Nikki Haley appointed Congressman Tim Scott as DeMint's replacement. Scott was the Republican nominee to serve out the remainder of DeMint's term. He is the first African-American Republican since shortly after Reconstruction to represent a Southern state. Richland County Councilwoman Joyce Dickerson won the Democratic nomination.

South Carolina Republican special primary election
Party	Candidate	Votes	%
Republican	Tim Scott (incumbent)	276,147	89.98%
Republican	Randall Young	30,741	10.02%
Total votes		306,888	100.00%

South Carolina Democratic special primary election
Party	Candidate	Votes	%
Democratic	Joyce Dickerson	72,874	65.39%
Democratic	Sidney Moore	26,310	23.61%
Democratic	Harry Pavilack	11,886	11.06%
Total votes		111,437	100.00%

South Carolina special election
Party	Candidate	Votes	%	±%
Republican	Tim Scott (incumbent)	757,215	61.12%	−0.36%
Democratic	Joyce Dickerson	459,583	37.09%	+9.44%
Independent	Jill Bossi	21,652	1.75%	
Other	Write-ins	532	0.04%	−1.62%
Majority		297,632	24.03%	−9.80%
Turnout		1,238,982	43.00%	−7.12%
Republican hold		Swing		

== South Dakota ==
South Dakota election
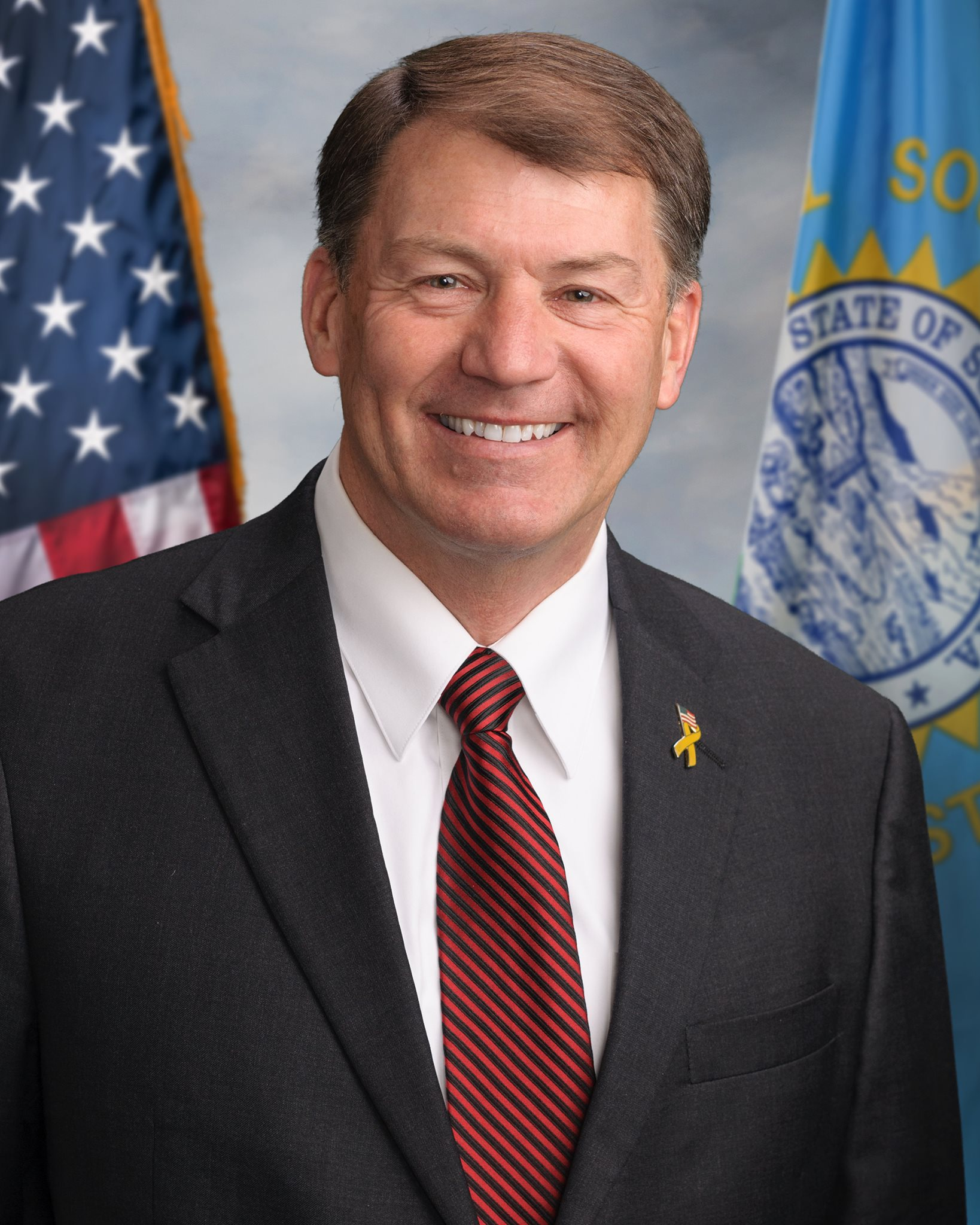

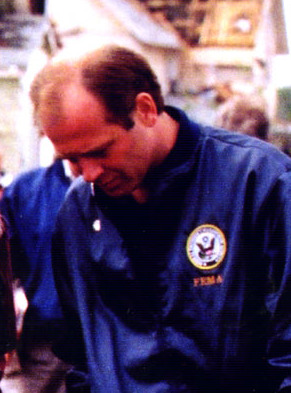

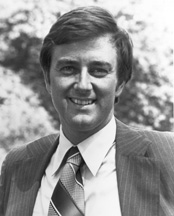
Nominee	Mike Rounds	Rick Weiland
Party	Republican	Democratic
Popular vote	140,741	82,456
Percentage	50.4%	29.5%
Nominee	Larry Pressler
Party	Independent
Popular vote	47,741
Percentage	17.1%
- Rounds: 40–50% 50–60% 60–70% Weiland: 30–40% 40–50% 50–60% 60–70% 80–90%
U.S. senator before election
Tim Johnson
Democratic
Elected U.S. Senator
Mike Rounds
Republican

Three-term incumbent Democrat Tim Johnson had been re-elected with 63% of the vote in 2008. Johnson announced on March 26, 2013, that he would not run for re-election. Former Congressional aide Rick Weiland was the Democratic nominee.

Among Republicans, former two-term Governor Mike Rounds announced his candidacy for the GOP nomination on November 29, 2012. Rounds won the Republican nomination over State Senator Larry Rhoden, State Representative Stace Nelson, and physician Annette Bosworth.

Former Republican U.S. Senator Larry Pressler and Republican State Senator Gordon Howie ran as independents. Pressler did not commit to caucusing with either party, while Howie said he would caucus with the Senate Republicans.

South Dakota Republican primary election
Party	Candidate	Votes	%
Republican	Mike Rounds	41,377	55.54%
Republican	Larry Rhoden	13,593	18.25%
Republican	Stace Nelson	13,179	17.69%
Republican	Annette Bosworth	4,283	5.75%
Republican	Jason Ravnsborg	2,066	2.77%
Total votes		74,490	100.00%

South Dakota general election
Party	Candidate	Votes	%	±%
Republican	Mike Rounds	140,741	50.37%	+12.86%
Democratic	Rick Weiland	82,456	29.51%	−32.98%
Independent	Larry Pressler	47,741	17.09%	N/A
Independent	Gordon Howie	8,474	3.03%	N/A
Majority		58,285	20.86%	4.12%
Turnout		279,412	54.2%	
Republican gain from Democratic				

== Tennessee ==
Tennessee election
- November 4, 2014
- Turnout: 35.97% ▼30.37 pp
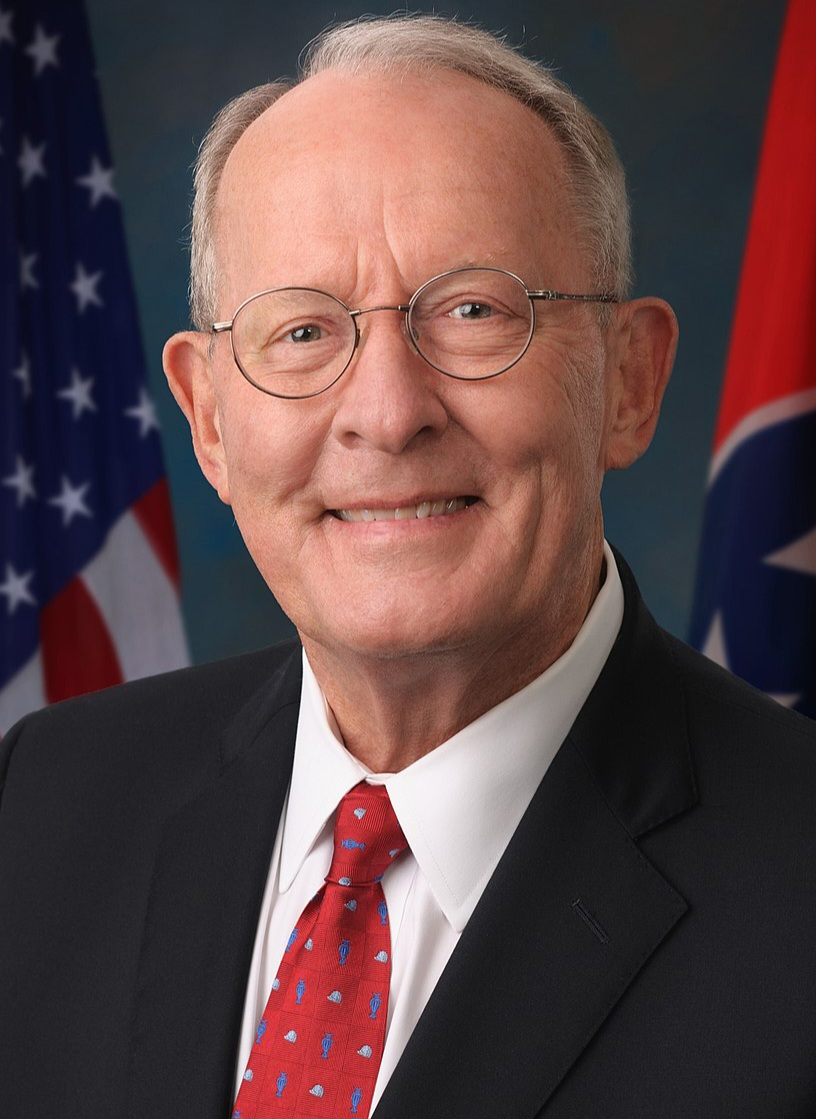
Nominee	Lamar Alexander	Gordon Ball
Party	Republican	Democratic
Popular vote	850,087	437,848
Percentage	61.87%	31.87%
- Alexander: 40–50% 50–60% 60–70% 70–80% Ball: 40–50% 50–60% 60–70%
U.S. senator before election
Lamar Alexander
Republican
Elected U.S. Senator
Lamar Alexander
Republican

Two-term incumbent Republican Lamar Alexander had been re-elected with 65% of the vote in 2008. He sought re-election to a third term. On August 7, 2014, Alexander won the Republican nomination over six challengers, including State Representative Joe Carr.

On November 4, 2014, Alexander faced Democratic nominee Gordon Ball, Libertarian Party nominee Joshua James, Constitution Party nominee Joe Wilmothm, and independent Danny Page also ran in the general election.

Tennessee Republican primary election
Party	Candidate	Votes	%
Republican	Lamar Alexander (incumbent)	331,705	49.65%
Republican	Joe Carr	271,324	40.61%
Republican	George Shea Flinn	34,668	5.19%
Republican	Christian Agnew	11,320	1.69%
Republican	Brenda S. Lenard	7,908	1.18%
Republican	John D. King	7,748	1.16%
Republican	Erin Kent Magee	3,366	0.52%
Total votes		668,039	100.00%

Tennessee Democratic primary election
Party	Candidate	Votes	%
Democratic	Gordon Ball	87,829	36.45%
Democratic	Terry Adams	85,794	35.61%
Democratic	Gary Gene Davis	42,549	17.66%
Democratic	Larry Crim	24,777	10.28%
Total votes		240,949	100.00%

Tennessee general election
Party	Candidate	Votes	%
Republican	Lamar Alexander (incumbent)	849,629	61.89%
Democratic	Gordon Ball	437,251	31.85%
Constitution	Joe Wilmoth	36,063	2.63%
Green	Martin Pleasant	12,536	0.91%
Independent	Tom Emerson, Jr.	11,149	0.81%
Independent	Danny Page	7,710	0.56%
Independent	Rick Tyler	5,753	0.42%
Independent	Joshua James	5,672	0.41%
Independent	Bartholomew J. Phillips	2,380	0.17%
Independent	Edmund L. Gauthier	2,311	0.17%
Independent	Eric Schechter	1,668	0.12%
Independent	Choudhury Salekin	784	0.06%
Total votes		1,372,906	100.00%

== Texas ==
Texas election
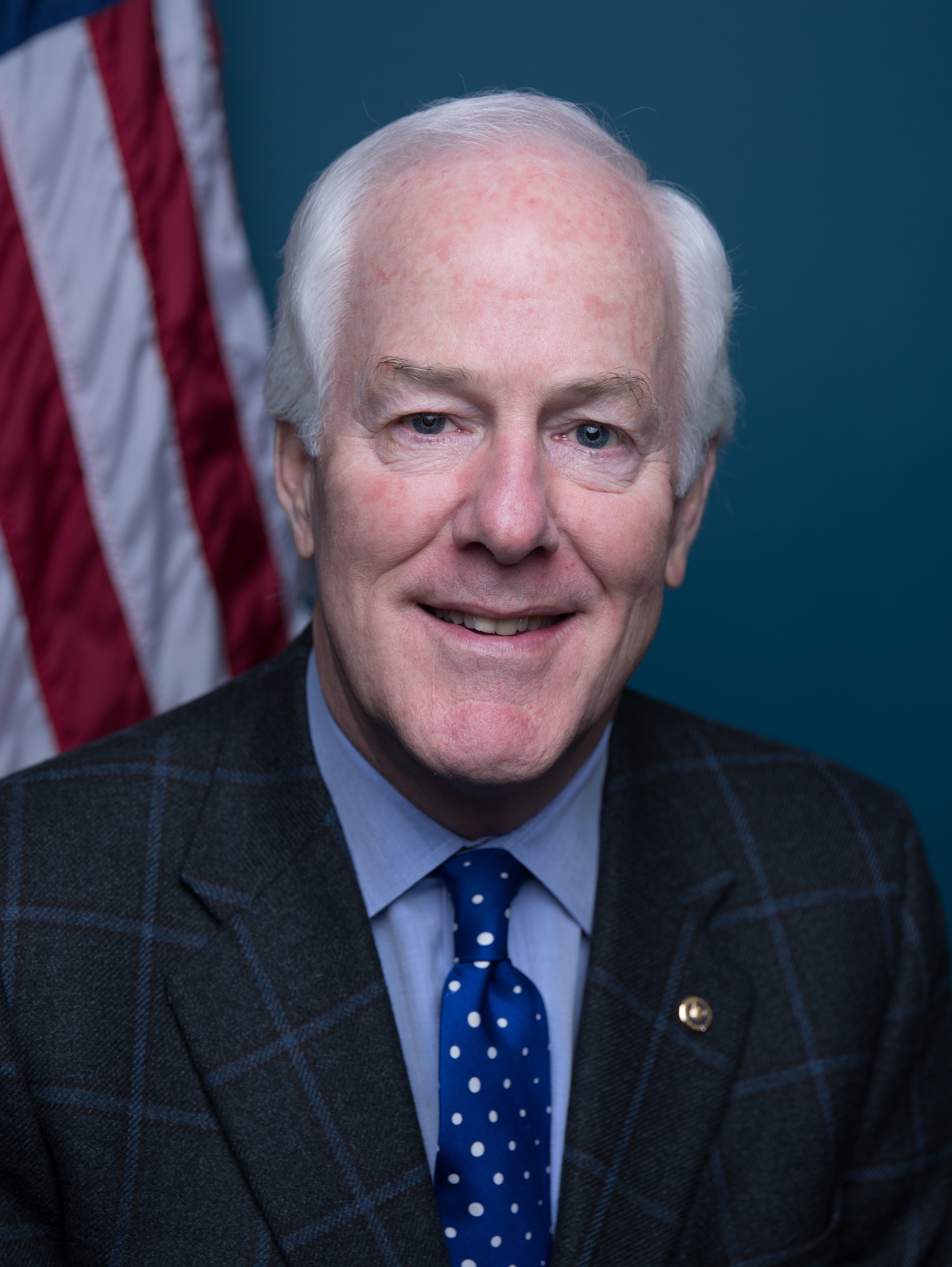

Nominee	John Cornyn	David Alameel
Party	Republican	Democratic
Popular vote	2,861,531	1,597,387
Percentage	61.56%	34.36%
- Cornyn: 40–50% 50–60% 60–70% 70–80% 80–90% >90% Alameel: 40–50% 50–60% 60–70% 70–80%
U.S. senator before election
John Cornyn
Republican
Elected U.S. Senator
John Cornyn
Republican

Two-term incumbent Republican John Cornyn, the Senate minority whip, had been re-elected with 55% of the vote in 2008. Cornyn sought re-election, and won the 2014 Republican primary with 59% of the vote. David Alameel, a dentist, and Kesha Rogers, a volunteer for The Lyndon LaRouche Policy Institute, faced each other in a runoff election for the Democratic nomination. Alameel won the runoff and was the Democratic nominee.

== Virginia ==
Virginia election
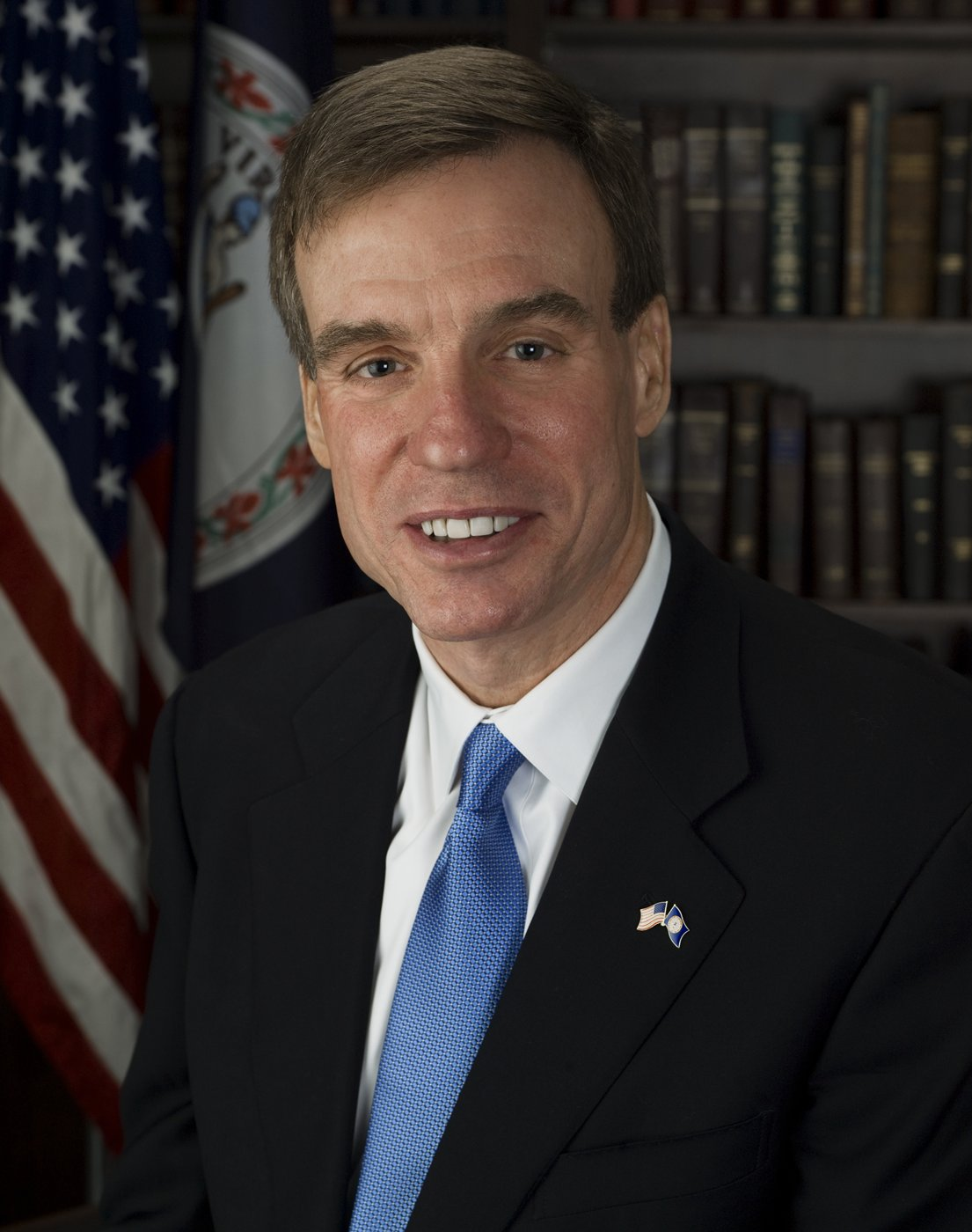

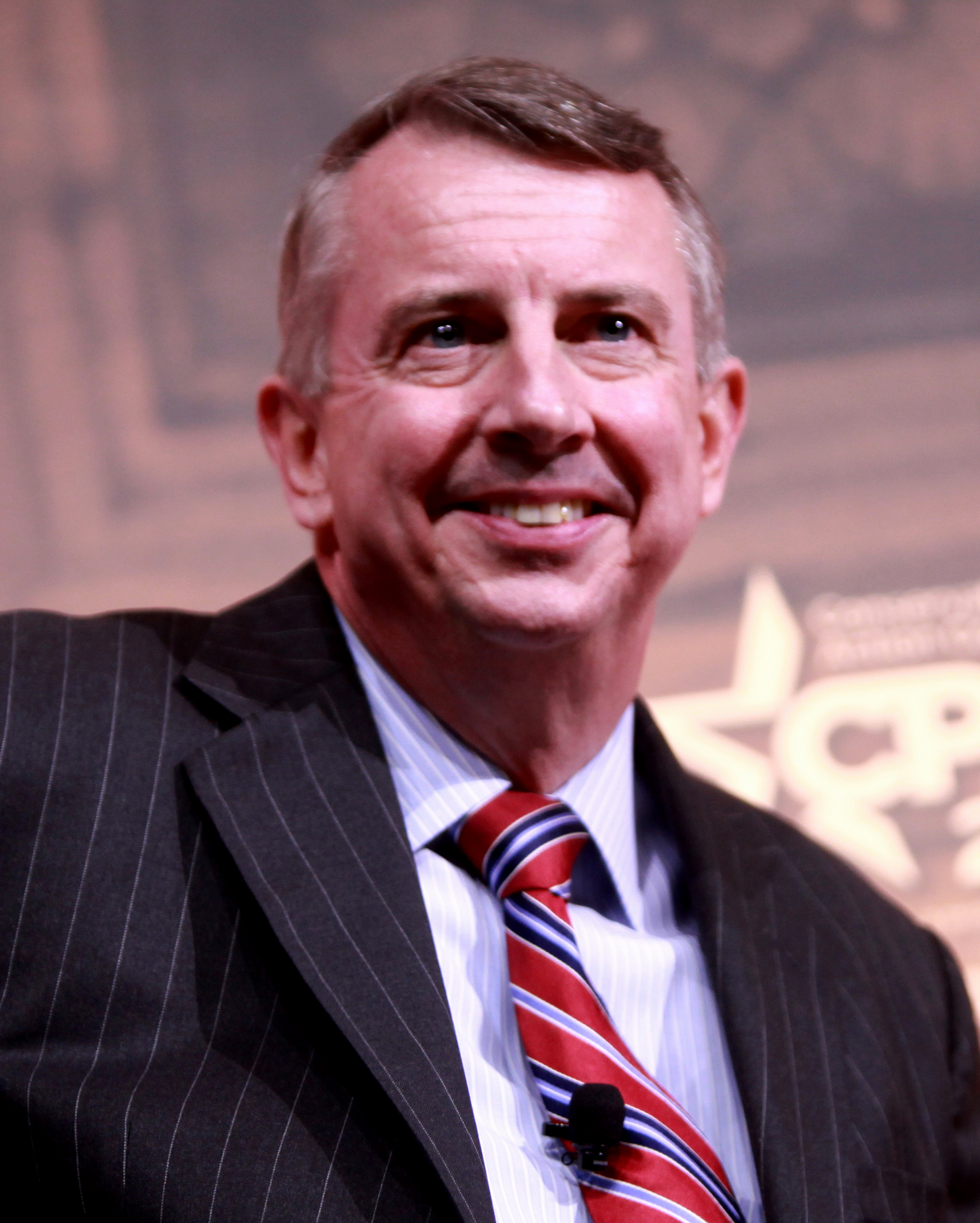
Nominee	Mark Warner	Ed Gillespie
Party	Democratic	Republican
Popular vote	1,073,667	1,055,940
Percentage	49.1%	48.3%
- County and independent city results Warner: 40–50% 50–60% 60–70% 70–80% 80–90% Gillespie: 40–50% 50–60% 60–70% 70–80%
U.S. senator before election
Mark Warner
Democratic
Elected U.S. Senator
Mark Warner
Democratic

One-term incumbent Democrat Mark Warner had been elected with 65% of the vote in 2008; he sought re-election. Ed Gillespie, former RNC chairman and presidential adviser, ran for the Republican nomination. Robert Sarvis, the Libertarian nominee for governor in 2013, also ran.

Virginia general election
Party	Candidate	Votes	%	±%
Democratic	Mark R. Warner (incumbent)	1,073,667	49.14%	−15.89%
Republican	Edward W. Gillespie	1,055,940	48.33%	+14.61%
Libertarian	Robert Sarvis	53,102	2.43%	+1.87%
Write-ins		1,764	0.08%	−0.01%
Plurality		17,727	0.81%	-30.49%
Turnout		2,184,473		
Democratic hold		Swing		

== West Virginia ==
West Virginia election
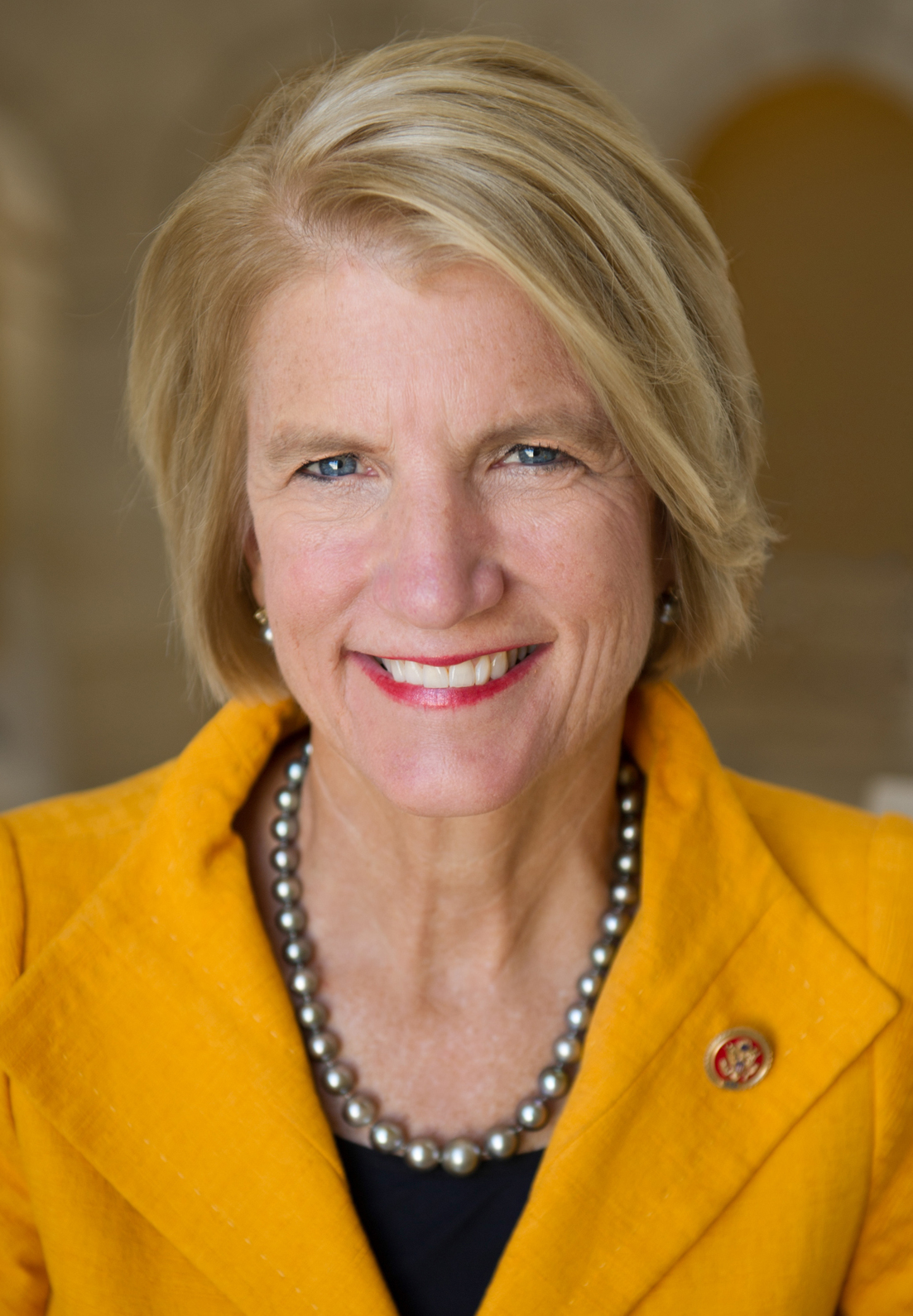

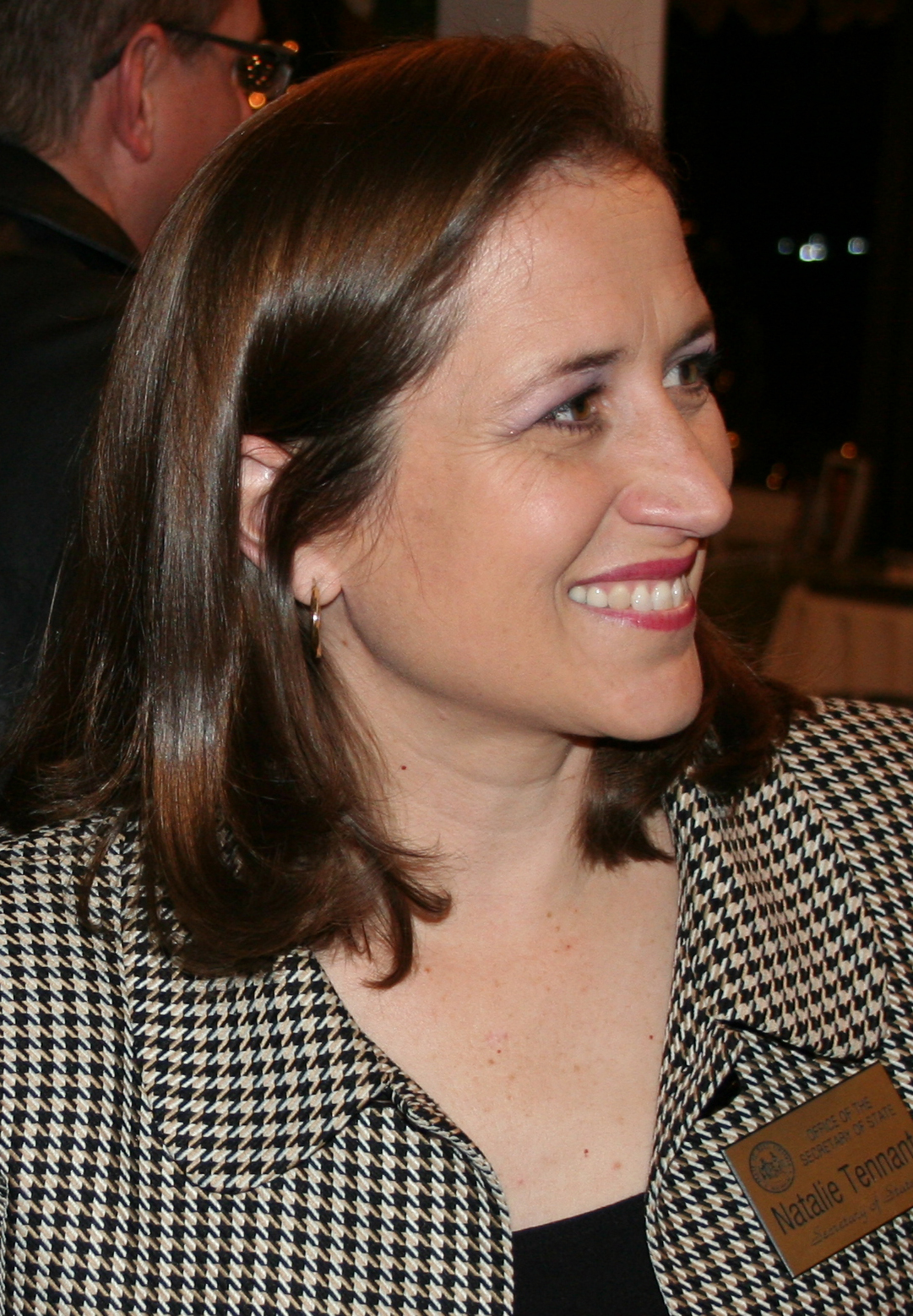
Nominee	Shelley Moore Capito	Natalie Tennant
Party	Republican	Democratic
Popular vote	280,123	155,456
Percentage	62.1%	34.5%
- Moore Capito: 50–60% 60–70% 70–80% 80–90%
U.S. senator before election
Jay Rockefeller
Democratic
Elected U.S. Senator
Shelley Moore Capito
Republican

Five-term incumbent Democrat Jay Rockefeller had been re-elected with 64% of the vote in 2008. He announced on January 11, 2013, that he would not seek re-election to a sixth term. Secretary of State Natalie Tennant won the Democratic nomination.

On November 26, 2012, Republican Congresswoman Shelley Moore Capito announced her plans to run for the seat, in hopes of becoming the first Republican senator elected from West Virginia since 1956. Moore Capito won the Republican nomination and the general election, becoming the first woman to serve as U.S. senator from West Virginia.

West Virginia Democratic primary election
Party	Candidate	Votes	%
Democratic	Natalie Tennant	104,598	77.95%
Democratic	Dennis Melton	15,817	11.79%
Democratic	David Wamsley	13,773	10.26%
Total votes		134,188	100.00%

West Virginia Republican primary election
Party	Candidate	Votes	%
Republican	Shelley Moore Capito	74,655	87.50%
Republican	Matthew Dodrill	7,072	8.29%
Republican	Larry Butcher	3,595	4.21%
Total votes		85,322	100.00%

West Virginia general election
Party	Candidate	Votes	%
Republican	Shelley Moore Capito	281,820	62.12%
Democratic	Natalie Tennant	156,360	34.47%
Libertarian	John Buckley	7,409	1.63%
Mountain	Bob Henry Baber	5,504	1.21%
Constitution	Phil Hudok	2,566	0.57%
Total votes		453,658	100.00%
Republican gain from Democratic			

== Wyoming ==
Wyoming election
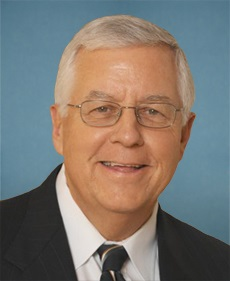

Nominee	Mike Enzi	Charlie Hardy
Party	Republican	Democratic
Popular vote	121,554	29,377
Percentage	72.2%	17.5%
Nominee	Curt Gottshall
Party	Independent
Popular vote	13,311
Percentage	7.9%
- County results Enzi: 50–60% 60–70% 70–80% 80–90%
U.S. senator before election
Mike Enzi
Republican
Elected U.S. Senator
Mike Enzi
Republican

Three-term incumbent Republican Mike Enzi had been re-elected with 76% of the vote in 2008. Enzi sought re-election. Liz Cheney, daughter of former Vice President Dick Cheney, briefly entered the race for the Republican nomination, but dropped her bid in January 2014. On August 19, Enzi won the Republican primary election with 82% of the vote, and Democrat Charlie Hardy, a former Catholic priest, won his party's primary election with 48% of the vote.

Wyoming Republican primary election
Party	Candidate	Votes	%
Republican	Mike Enzi (incumbent)	77,965	78.51%
Republican	Bryan E. Miller	9,330	9.39%
Republican	James "Coaltrain" Gregory	3,740	3.77%
Republican	Thomas Bleming	2,504	2.52%
Republican	Arthur Bruce Clifton	1,403	1.41%
Republican	Write-in	346	0.35%
Republican	Over Votes	51	0.05%
Republican	Under Votes	3,973	4.00%
Total votes		99,312	100.00%

Wyoming Democratic primary election
Party	Candidate	Votes	%
Democratic	Charlie Hardy	7,200	39.33%
Democratic	Rex Wilde	3,012	16.46%
Democratic	Al Hamburg	2,988	16.32%
Democratic	William Bryk	1,670	9.12%
Democratic	Write-in	216	1.18%
Democratic	Over Votes	31	0.17%
Democratic	Under Votes	3,189	17.42%
Total votes		18,306	100.00%

Wyoming general election
Party	Candidate	Votes	%
Republican	Mike Enzi (incumbent)	121,554	72.19%
Democratic	Charlie Hardy	29,377	17.45%
Independent	Curt Gottshall	13,311	7.90%
Libertarian	Joseph Porambo	3,677	2.18%
Write-in	Other	471	0.28%
Total votes		168,390	100.00%

== See also ==
- 2014 United States elections
  - 2014 United States gubernatorial elections
  - 2014 United States House of Representatives elections
- 113th United States Congress
- 114th United States Congress
