= 2017 Montana's at-large congressional district special election =

- May 25, 2017

Montana's at-large congressional district
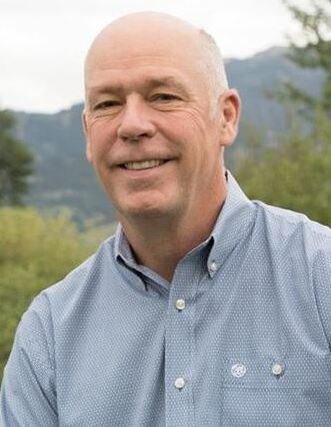

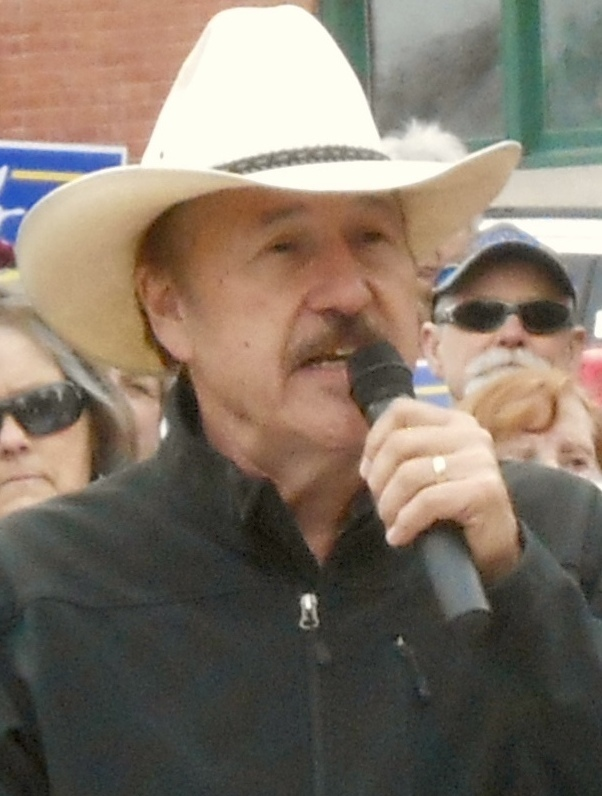

Nominee	Greg Gianforte	Rob Quist	Mark Wicks
Party	Republican	Democratic	Libertarian
Popular vote	190,520	169,214	21,682
Percentage	49.95%	44.37%	5.68%
- Gianforte: 40–50% 50–60% 60–70% 70–80% 80–90% >90% Quist: 40–50% 50–60% 60–70% 70–80% 80–90% >90% Tie: 40–50% No votes
U.S. Representative before election
Ryan Zinke
Republican
Elected U.S. Representative
Greg Gianforte
Republican

In Montana, an at-large congressional district special election was held on May 25, 2017, to determine the member of the United States House of Representatives for Montana's at-large congressional district. The election was necessitated by incumbent Republican Representative Ryan Zinke's appointment as United States Secretary of the Interior. Zinke resigned on March 1, 2017, upon his confirmation.

Montana's state law required the governor of Montana to call for a special election to be held no less than 85 and no more than 100 days after the vacancy. Governor Steve Bullock declared a special election to take place on May 25, the earliest possible day he was legally allowed to choose.

The Democratic, Republican, Libertarian, and Green Parties held nominating conventions to decide their nominee. The day before the election, Gianforte assaulted a reporter and was charged with misdemeanor assault. At around 10:30pm MST, the election was called for Gianforte after 77% of the votes were counted.

== Republican Party ==
The Republican Party nominated a candidate at a convention on March 6.

=== Nominated ===
- Greg Gianforte, founder of RightNow Technologies and nominee for governor in 2016

=== Eliminated at convention ===
- Edward Buttrey, state senator
- Carl Glimm, state representative
- Ken Miller, former state senator, former chair of the Montana Republican Party and candidate for governor in 2012
- Samuel Redfern, nonprofit executive
- Dean Rehbein, contractor
- Ed Walker, former state senator

=== Withdrawn ===
- Eugene Graf, businessman
- Drew Turiano, real estate agent and perennial candidate

=== Declined ===
- Gary Carlson, publisher of the White Hat Express
- Russell Fagg, Yellowstone County District Judge
- Matthew Rosendale, state auditor and candidate for this seat in 2014
- Scott Sales, president of the State Senate
- Richard B. Spencer, president of the National Policy Institute
- Daniel Zolnikov, state representative

=== Results ===
Republican Convention
Candidate	First ballot	Pct.
Greg Gianforte	150.5	61%
Others	94.5	39%

== Democratic Party ==
The Democratic Party selected a nominee at a convention on March 5.

The Bozeman Daily Chronicle from February 4 to 8 conducted a straw poll of Democratic delegates. Of 89 delegates who responded, Rob Quist was selected by 37, Amanda Curtis by 30, Kelly McCarthy by 13, 9 were undecided, and zero selected John Meyer or other.

=== Nominated ===
- Rob Quist, musician, former spokesman and advocate for the Montana Food Bank, and former member of the Montana Arts Council

=== Eliminated at convention ===
- Amanda Curtis, state representative and nominee for the U.S. Senate in 2014
- Kelly McCarthy, state representative
- John Meyer, attorney and executive director of the Cottonwood Environmental Law Center
- Lee "Link" Neimark, ski instructor and small business owner
- Gary Stein, teacher and candidate for the state house in 2008
- Thomas Weida, retired businessman
- Dan West, former aide to Senators Max Baucus and Mark Udall and former appointee to NASA

=== Declined ===
- Zeno Baucus, Assistant U.S. Attorney and son of former U.S. Senator Max Baucus
- Larry Jent, former state senator
- Denise Juneau, former superintendent of public instruction and candidate for this seat in 2016
- Casey Schreiner, state representative

=== Endorsements (primary) ===
Kelly McCarthy
- Robyn Driscoll, Yellowstone County Commissioner and former state senator
- Cliff Larsen, former state senator
- John Rogers, former Montana Chief Business Development Officer
Rob Quist

Imdividuals

- Dorothy Bradley, former state representative and nominee for governor in 1992
- John Morrison, former state auditor
- Brian Schweitzer, former governor
- Jonathan Windy Boy, state representative and former state senator

Organizations

- Our Revolution, progressive political action organization spun out of Senator Bernie Sanders' 2016 presidential campaign
Dan West
- Reggie Watts, comedian and musician

=== Results ===
Democratic Convention
Candidate	First ballot	Pct.	Second ballot	Pct.	Third ballot	Pct.	Fourth ballot	Pct.
Rob Quist	57	36%	62	39%	72	45%	90	57%
Amanda Curtis	39	25%	48	30%	57	36%	69	43%
Kelly McCarthy	38	24%	42	26%	31	19%	Eliminated	
Dan West	17	11%	8	5%	Eliminated		Eliminated	
Others	7	4%	Eliminated		Eliminated		Eliminated	

== Libertarian Party ==
The Libertarian Party Convention on March 11, 2017, was held at Eagle's Lodge in Helena, Montana.

The following county affiliate parties were represented at the convention:

- Gallatin County
- Flathead County
- Park County
- Missoula County
- Ravalli County
- Lake County
- Yellowstone County
- Broadwater County
- Lewis and Clark County
- Hill County

Officers of the Montana Libertarian Party and delegates from the assembled counties had voting rights.

=== Nominated ===
- Mark Wicks, author, rancher and fruit salesman

=== Eliminated at convention ===
- Chris Colvin, retired masonry contractor and writer
- Evan Gardner, small business owner
- Nathan McKenty
- Dan Nelson, IT administrator
- Joe Paschal, rancher and businessman
- Rufus Peace, accounting analyst
- James White, Uber driver

=== Withdrawn ===
- Rick Breckenridge, land surveyor

=== Results ===
Libertarian Convention
Candidate	First ballot	Pct.	Second ballot	Pct.	Third ballot	Pct.
Mark Wicks	3	19%	5	29%	9	56%
Joe Paschal	5	31%	6	35%	7	44%
Evan Gardner	3	19%	3	18%	Eliminated	
Rufus Peace	3	19%	3	18%	Eliminated	
Dan Nelson	1	6%	Eliminated			
Chris Colvin	0	0%	Eliminated			
Nathan McKenty	0	0%	Eliminated			
James White	0	0%	Eliminated			
None of the Above	1	6%	Eliminated			

== Green Party ==
The Green Party Convention on March 4, 2017, was held at the University of Montana's Payne Family Native American Center.

Breck, along with two independent candidates, won a lawsuit in U.S. District Court against the Montana Secretary of State, ruling Montana's ballot access laws to be unconstitutional in the case of special elections. The District Court Judge ruled to change the original requirement to submit 14,268 ballot petition signatures, reducing that requirement to 400 signatures. The US Court decision failed to provide further remedy and Breck's name was not placed on the ballot despite injunctive appeals to the Ninth Circuit Court and U.S. Supreme Court. Breck subsequently endorsed Independent write-in candidate Doug Campbell who was a co-plaintiff in the suit.

=== Nominated ===
- Thomas Breck

== General election ==
=== Campaign ===
During his 2017 congressional special election campaign, Gianforte relaxed his past pledges to refuse all PAC money, and began to turn away only corporate PAC funding. His campaign began accepting contributions from political party and leadership PACs.

The night before the election, Gianforte physically assaulted Ben Jacobs, a reporter from The Guardian, in front of multiple witnesses, knocking him down, punching him, and breaking his glasses. Gianforte was subsequently charged with misdemeanor assault. The editorial boards of the Billings Gazette, the Independent Record, and the Missoulian rescinded their endorsements of Gianforte.

The Gianforte campaign released a statement following the incident alleging the incident was caused by, "this aggressive behavior from a liberal journalist", a claim contradictory to the eyewitness account of the Fox News team present in the room at the time. Alicia Acuna, one of two Fox news reporters present, and the only eyewitnesses to the incident, stated that Jacobs had walked into the room, put a voice recorder up to Gianforte's face and began asking questions. She stated that Jacobs, however, showed no sign of physical aggression and did not physically engage Gianforte before being attacked by the Republican candidate.

On June 12, following the election, Gianforte was sentenced to community service and fined $385 after admitting the charge.

=== Predictions ===
Source	Ranking	As of
The Cook Political Report	Lean R	May 12, 2017
Inside Elections	Lean R	May 25, 2017

=== Endorsements ===
Greg Gianforte

National politicians

- Steve Daines, U.S. senator (R-MT)
- Mike Pence, vice president of the United States and former governor of Indiana
- Donald Trump, president of the United States
- Ryan Zinke, Secretary of the Interior and former congressman (R-MT)

Statewide officeholders

- Elsie Arntzen, superintendent of public instruction of the State of Montana

Local officeholders

- David Clarke, sheriff of Milwaukee County, Wisconsin

Individuals

- Donald Trump Jr., businessman and television personality

Organizations

- The Crow Tribe of Montana
- Montana Republican Party
- National Federation of Independent Business
- Montana Shooting Sports Association
- NRA Political Victory Fund

Newspapers

- ~~Billings Gazette~~ (later pulled)
- ~~Independent Record~~ (later pulled)
- ~~The Missoulian~~ (later pulled)
Rob Quist

U.S. senators

- Al Franken, U.S. senator (D-MN)
- Catherine Cortez Masto, U.S. senator (D-NV)
- Bernie Sanders, U.S. senator (I-VT)
- Jon Tester, U.S. senator (D-MT)
- Elizabeth Warren, U.S. senator (D-MA)

Governors

- Steve Bullock, governor of Montana
- Brian Schweitzer, former governor of Montana

Local politicians

- Carson Taylor, mayor of Bozeman, Montana

Individuals

- Jeff Bridges, actor, singer, and producer
- Michael Keaton, actor and producer
- Alyssa Milano, actress and UNICEF activist
- Bill Pullman, actor
- Cecile Richards, president of Planned Parenthood

Labor unions

- International Association of Sheet Metal, Air, Rail and Transportation Workers
- International Brotherhood of Electrical Workers
- Montana Education Association-Montana Federation of Teachers
- Montana Public Employees Association
- Montana State AFL–CIO
- Montana State Council of Professional Firefighters

Organizations

- Democracy for America
- End Citizens United
- League of Conservation Voters
- Montana Conservation Voters
- Montana Democratic Party
- Montana Sportmen's Alliance
- NARAL Pro-Choice America
- National Committee to Preserve Social Security and Medicare
- Northern Cheyenne Tribe
- Our Revolution

Websites

- Daily Kos, political news blog
- Moveon.org, a progressive public policy advocacy group and political action committee
Mark Wicks

Organizations

- Montana Libertarian Party

Local officeholders

- Jeff Krauss, former mayor of Bozeman, Montana

=== Polling ===
Poll source	Date(s) administered	Sample size	Margin of error	Greg Gianforte (R)	Rob Quist (D)	Mark Wicks (L)	Thomas Breck (G)	Undecided
Change Research	May 20–23, 2017	1,888	± 2.0%	49%	44%	7%	–	–
Gravis Marketing	May 22, 2017	818	± 3.4%	49%	35%	8%	–	9%
Gravis Marketing	May 2–4, 2017	462	± 4.6%	45%	37%	5%	3%	10%
Gravis Marketing	April 27, 2017	836	± 3.4%	52%	39%	6%	–	2%
Garin-Hart-Yang (D)	April 25–27, 2017	601	± 4.0%	49%	43%	–	–	8%
Emerson College	April 20–21, 2017	648	± 3.8%	52%	37%	5%	–	7%
Gravis Marketing	April 6, 2017	1,222	± 2.9%	50%	38%	3%	2%	7%

=== Results ===
Montana's at-large congressional district special election, 2017
Party	Candidate	Votes	%	±%
Republican	Greg Gianforte	190,520	49.95%	−6.24%
Democratic	Rob Quist	169,214	44.37%	+3.82%
Libertarian	Mark Wicks	21,682	5.68%	+2.42%
Total votes		381,416	100.00%	N/A
Republican hold				

County results

	Greg Gianforte Republican		Rob Quist Democratic		Mark Wicks Libertarian		Margin		Total	
County	Votes	%	Votes	%	Votes	%	Votes	%	Votes	Turnout
Beaverhead	2,239	62.28%	1,144	31.82%	212	5.90%	1,095	30.46%	3,621	53.92%
Big Horn	1,193	43.70%	1,394	51.06%	143	5.24%	201	7.36%	2,743	34.30%
Blaine	821	41.82%	974	49.62%	168	8.56%	153	7.79%	1,969	49.56%
Broadwater	1,481	65.39%	638	28.17%	146	6.45%	843	37.22%	2,282	53.52%
Carbon	2,572	53.25%	1,975	40.89%	283	5.86%	597	12.36%	4,845	63.79%
Carter	441	84.32%	59	11.28%	23	4.40%	382	73.04%	532	54.68%
Cascade	13,427	49.80%	11,546	42.83%	1,987	7.37%	1,881	6.98%	27,143	50.19%
Chouteau	1,234	57.85%	717	33.61%	182	8.53%	517	24.24%	2,149	61.29%
Custer	2,206	60.99%	1,175	32.49%	236	6.52%	1,031	28.50%	3,629	50.55%
Daniels	495	72.79%	151	22.21%	34	5.00%	344	50.59%	680	55.69%
Dawson	2,019	66.74%	827	27.34%	179	5.92%	1,192	39.40%	3,035	51.26%
Deer Lodge	955	28.99%	2,063	62.63%	276	8.38%	1,108	33.64%	3,313	60.64%
Fallon	702	81.25%	136	15.74%	26	3.01%	566	65.51%	868	43.95%
Fergus	3,005	66.22%	1,196	26.36%	337	7.43%	1,809	39.86%	4,557	58.74%
Flathead	20,302	57.38%	13,630	38.52%	1,450	4.10%	6,672	18.86%	35,462	51.85%
Gallatin	17,074	40.88%	22,902	54.84%	1,787	4.28%	5,828	13.95%	41,909	54.69%
Garfield	487	90.19%	29	5.37%	24	4.44%	458	84.81%	540	58.76%
Glacier	929	30.20%	1,972	64.11%	175	5.69%	1,043	33.91%	3,085	39.15%
Golden Valley	282	71.03%	88	22.17%	27	6.80%	194	48.87%	397	65.30%
Granite	838	60.07%	470	33.69%	87	6.24%	368	26.38%	1,399	59.58%
Hill	2,061	43.62%	2,091	44.25%	573	12.13%	30	0.63%	4,782	50.25%
Jefferson	2,997	56.71%	1,996	37.77%	292	5.53%	1,001	18.94%	5,322	62.49%
Judith Basin	636	65.43%	255	26.23%	81	8.33%	381	39.20%	975	67.66%
Lake	5,193	51.37%	4,469	44.21%	447	4.42%	724	7.16%	10,133	53.10%
Lewis and Clark	11,880	42.75%	14,487	52.13%	1,423	5.12%	2,607	9.38%	27,957	60.96%
Liberty	489	58.49%	208	24.88%	139	16.63%	281	33.61%	842	71.17%
Lincoln	4,471	65.41%	2,104	30.78%	260	3.80%	2,367	34.63%	6,855	50.03%
Madison	2,247	60.53%	1,235	33.27%	230	6.20%	1,012	27.26%	3,741	59.60%
McCone	632	76.70%	155	18.81%	37	4.49%	477	57.89%	830	67.04%
Meagher	516	66.58%	196	25.29%	63	8.13%	320	41.29%	780	59.68%
Mineral	911	58.85%	538	34.75%	99	6.40%	373	24.10%	1,548	49.41%
Missoula	15,137	32.10%	30,054	63.73%	1,968	4.17%	14,917	31.63%	47,356	56.14%
Musselshell	1,307	73.72%	324	18.27%	142	8.01%	983	55.44%	1,779	58.58%
Park	3,329	45.12%	3,678	49.85%	371	5.03%	349	4.73%	7,401	57.81%
Petroleum	203	79.61%	38	14.90%	14	5.49%	165	64.71%	256	60.24%
Phillips	1,374	75.70%	304	16.75%	137	7.55%	1,070	58.95%	1,824	66.45%
Pondera	1,267	58.28%	733	33.72%	174	8.00%	534	24.56%	2,182	61.99%
Powder River	570	77.87%	121	16.53%	41	5.60%	449	61.34%	732	56.92%
Powell	1,344	63.34%	622	29.31%	156	7.35%	722	34.02%	2,138	60.24%
Prairie	405	74.18%	104	19.05%	37	6.78%	301	55.13%	546	62.69%
Ravalli	10,480	59.76%	6,224	35.49%	833	4.75%	4,256	24.27%	17,660	57.95%
Richland	1,958	73.78%	601	22.65%	95	3.58%	1,357	51.13%	2,662	37.02%
Roosevelt	916	44.02%	1,030	49.50%	135	6.49%	114	5.48%	2,087	35.46%
Rosebud	1,400	57.64%	888	36.56%	141	5.80%	512	21.08%	2,435	48.40%
Sanders	2,903	63.79%	1,353	29.73%	295	6.48%	1,550	34.06%	4,572	54.38%
Sheridan	691	54.45%	483	38.06%	95	7.49%	208	16.39%	1,276	52.45%
Silver Bow	3,635	29.33%	7,872	63.52%	886	7.15%	4,237	34.19%	12,490	56.61%
Stillwater	2,429	67.45%	914	25.38%	258	7.16%	1,515	42.07%	3,617	58.92%
Sweet Grass	1,076	69.29%	403	25.95%	74	4.76%	673	43.34%	1,553	58.74%
Teton	1,536	58.47%	887	33.76%	204	7.77%	649	24.70%	2,646	65.19%
Toole	989	61.89%	443	27.72%	166	10.39%	546	34.17%	1,613	60.50%
Treasure	213	64.35%	79	23.87%	39	11.78%	134	40.48%	332	59.18%
Valley	1,904	62.78%	859	28.32%	270	8.90%	1,045	34.45%	3,035	67.79%
Wheatland	466	62.63%	198	26.61%	80	10.75%	268	36.02%	745	55.89%
Wibaux	273	78.90%	62	17.92%	11	3.18%	211	60.98%	348	46.96%
Yellowstone	29,980	55.79%	20,120	37.44%	3,634	6.76%	9,860	18.35%	54,066	55.70%

==== Counties that flipped from Republican to Democratic ====
- Park lLargest city: Livingston)
- Lewis and Clark (largest city: Helena)
- Hill (largest city: Havre)

== See also ==
- List of special elections to the United States House of Representatives
- United States House of Representatives election in Montana, 2016
