= 2014 United States Senate election in Montana =

- November 4, 2014
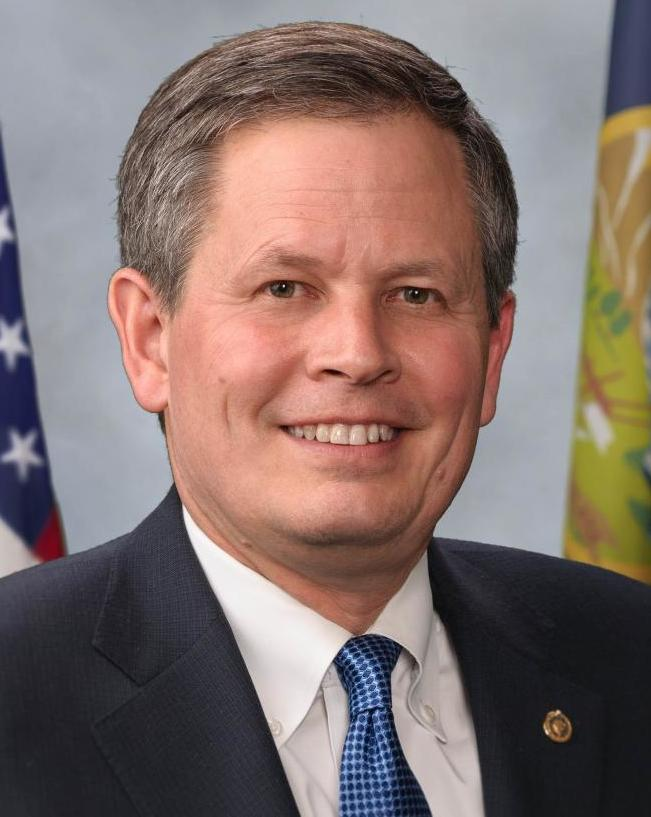

Nominee	Steve Daines	Amanda Curtis (replacing John Walsh)
Party	Republican	Democratic
Popular vote	213,709	148,184
Percentage	57.79%	40.07%
- County results Daines: 50–60% 60–70% 70–80% 80–90% Curtis: 50–60% 60–70%
U.S. senator before election
John Walsh (Note: In February 2014, Walsh was appointed by Governor Steve Bullock to fill the vacancy caused by the resignation of Senator Max Baucus, who had appointed U.S. Ambassador to China.)
Democratic
Elected U.S. Senator
Steve Daines
Republican

The 2014 United States Senate election in Montana took place on November 4, 2014, to elect a member of the United States Senate from Montana, concurrently with other elections to the United States Senate in other states and elections to the United States House of Representatives and various state and local elections. This was one of the seven Democratic-held Senate seats up for election in a state that Mitt Romney won in the 2012 presidential election.

Democratic Senator Max Baucus, who had announced he would retire and not seek a seventh term, resigned in February 2014 in order to accept an appointment as United States Ambassador to China under President Barack Obama. Democrat John Walsh, the Lieutenant Governor of Montana, who was already running for Baucus' seat when Baucus was named to the ambassadorship, was appointed to replace Baucus by Governor Steve Bullock for the remainder of his term.

Walsh won the Democratic primary on June 3 and ran for a first full term in office, but withdrew from the race on August 7, 2014, due to allegations that he had plagiarized a term paper while attending the Army War College. Democrats selected Amanda Curtis, a state representative from Butte, to replace Walsh as the party's nominee at a convention in Helena on August 16. Steve Daines, the incumbent U.S. Representative from Montana's at-large congressional district, easily won the Republican nomination.

Daines defeated Curtis 57.8% to 40.1%, while Libertarian Roger Roots won 2.1%. Daines and Arkansas' Tom Cotton became just the 18th and 19th U.S. House freshmen to win U.S. Senate races over the last 100 years, and just the third and fourth over the last 40 years. Daines became the first Republican to win this Senate seat since 1907, as well as the first to ever be popularly elected to the seat.

== Democratic primary ==
=== Candidates ===
==== Declared ====
- Dirk Adams, rancher, businessman and former business law professor
- John Bohlinger, former Republican lieutenant governor of Montana
- John Walsh, incumbent U.S. Senator, former lieutenant governor of Montana and former adjutant general of the Montana National Guard

==== Declined ====
- Max Baucus, United States ambassador to China (2014–2017) and former U.S. senator (1978–2014)
- John Brueggeman, former Republican state senator
- Steve Bullock, governor of Montana
- Shane Colton, attorney and former commissioner of the Montana Department of Fish, Wildlife and Parks
- Amanda Curtis, state representative
- Melinda Gopher, writer and candidate for Montana's at-large congressional district in 2010
- Mike Halligan, executive director of the Dennis and Phyllis Washington Foundation and former state senator
- Denise Juneau, Montana Superintendent of Public Instruction
- Nancy Keenan, former president of NARAL Pro-Choice America and former Montana Superintendent of Public Instruction
- John Lewis, former state director for Senator Max Baucus (ran for the U.S. House)
- Monica Lindeen, Montana state auditor
- Linda McCulloch, secretary of state of Montana and former state representative
- Mike McGrath, chief justice of the Montana Supreme Court and former attorney general of Montana
- Brian Morris, judge of the United States District Court for the District of Montana and former associate justice of the Montana Supreme Court
- John Morrison, former Montana state auditor and candidate for the U.S. Senate in 2006
- Stephanie Schriock, president of Emily's List and former chief of staff to Senator Jon Tester
- Brian Schweitzer, former governor of Montana
- Kendall Van Dyk, state senator
- Mike Wheat, justice of the Montana Supreme Court (ran for re-election)
- Carol Williams, former majority leader of the Montana Senate and nominee for lieutenant governor of Montana in 2000
- Pat Williams, former U.S. representative
- Whitney Williams, former director of operations for Hillary Clinton
- Franke Wilmer, state representative
- Jonathan Windy Boy, state senator

=== Endorsements ===
John Walsh

Elected officials

- Max Baucus, former U.S. senator (D-MT)
- Steve Bullock, governor of Montana
- Jon Tester, U.S. senator (D-MT)

Organizations

- Council for a Livable World
- VoteVets.org

=== Polling ===
Poll source	Date(s) administered	Sample size	Margin of error	John Walsh	Dirk Adams	John Bohlinger	Other	Undecided
Public Policy Polling	November 15–17, 2013	381	± 5%	39%	3%	31%	—	27%
Harper Polling	January 20–22, 2014	519	± 4.3%	23%	2%	23%	—	52%

Hypothetical polling

Poll source	Date(s) administered	Sample size	Margin of error	Max Baucus	Brian Schweitzer	Other	Undecided
Public Policy Polling	June 16–19, 2011	333	± 5.4%	34%	51%	—	14%
Public Policy Polling	November 28–30, 2011	573	± 4.1%	35%	51%	—	14%
Public Policy Polling	April 26–29, 2012	332	± 5.4%	37%	48%	—	15%
Public Policy Polling	September 10–11, 2012	201	± 5.4%	36%	40%	—	24%
Public Policy Polling	February 15–17, 2013	371	± 5.1%	35%	54%	—	11%

Poll source	Date(s) administered	Sample size	Margin of error	Denise Juneau	Brian Schweitzer	Other	Undecided
Harper Polling	April 27–28, 2013	165	± 7.63%	14%	78%	—	8%

=== Results ===
Results by county Walsh: 50–60%; 60–70%; 70–80%; Bohlinger: 50–60%

Democratic primary results
Party	Candidate	Votes	%
Democratic	John Walsh (incumbent)	48,665	64.04%
Democratic	John Bohlinger	17,187	22.62%
Democratic	Dirk Adams	10,139	13.34%
Total votes		75,991	100.00%

== Democratic convention ==
Because Walsh withdrew, a nominating convention was held to pick a new nominee prior to August 20. The state party called a convention for August 16, and voting delegates were members of the State Central Committee, specifically: "one chair and one vice chair from each existing county central committee; one state committeeman and one state committeewoman from each county central committee; all voting members of the State Party Executive Board; the president of each chartered organization of the Montana Democratic Party; Montana State House leadership, and Montana State Senate leaders, and all Democrats currently holding statewide or federal office."

=== Candidates ===
Momentary buzz was created by a movement to draft actor Jeff Bridges for the nomination, with over 1,000 people signing a petition on Change.org and a Twitter account, DudeSenator, being created online. Bridges, who lives part-time and owns property in the Paradise Valley south of Livingston, Montana, declined the offer on the Howard Stern show, noting the disapproval of his wife. Other news outlets noted that he also was not registered to vote in Montana.

==== Potential ====
- Dirk Adams, rancher, businessman and former business law professor
- John Bohlinger, former Republican Lieutenant Governor of Montana
- Amanda Curtis, state representative
- Linda McCulloch, secretary of state of Montana
- Anna Whiting Sorrell, former director of the state Department of Health and Human Services and former state director of the Indian Health Services

==== Withdrew ====
- Franke Wilmer, state representative
- David Wanzenried, state senator

==== Declined ====
- Jeff Bridges, actor and part-time Montana resident
- Steve Bullock, Governor of Montana
- Denise Juneau, Montana Superintendent of Public Instruction
- Nancy Keenan, former president of NARAL Pro-Choice America and former Montana Superintendent of Public Instruction
- Monica Lindeen, Montana State Auditor
- Stephanie Schriock, president of Emily's List and former chief of staff to Senator Jon Tester
- Brian Schweitzer, former governor of Montana
- Carol Williams, former Majority Leader of the Montana Senate and nominee for Lieutenant Governor of Montana in 2000

=== Endorsements ===
Amanda Curtis

Elected officials

- Steve Bullock, governor of Montana
- Kirsten Gillibrand, junior U.S. senator from New York
- Denise Juneau, Montana State Superintendent of Public Instruction
- Monica Lindeen, Montana Commissioner of Securities & Insurance
- Linda McCulloch, Montana secretary of state
- Angela McLean, lieutenant governor of Montana
- Jon Tester, senior U.S. senator from Montana
- John Walsh, junior U.S. senator from Montana
- Mike Wheat, Montana Supreme Court justice

Organizations

- Democracy for America, political action committee
- EMILY's List, political action committee
- International Association of Firefighters, labor union
- Montana AFL–CIO, labor union
- Montana Conservation Voters conservation movement organization
- Montana Education Association-Montana Federation of Teachers, labor union
- Montana Laborers' International Union of North America, labor union
- Montana Native Vote, Native American rights organization
- Montana Sportsmen Alliance sportsmen and conservation organization
- Montana State Building and Construction Trades Council, trade union
- Montana Stonewall Democrats, LGBT rights group affiliated with the Democratic Party
- NARAL Pro-Choice America, reproductive rights organization
- National Organization for Women, feminist organization

=== Results ===
Democratic convention results
Party	Candidate	Votes	%
Democratic	Amanda Curtis	82	64.0%
Democratic	Dirk Adams	46	36.0%
Total votes		128	100.0%

== Republican primary ==
=== Candidates ===
==== Declared ====
- Susan Cundiff
- Steve Daines, U.S. representative and nominee for lieutenant governor in 2008
- Champ Edmunds, state representative

==== Withdrew ====
- David Leaser, air traffic manager at Glacier Park International Airport
- Corey Stapleton, former state senator and candidate for governor in 2012 (running for MT-AL)

==== Declined ====
- Chuck Baldwin, Baptist pastor, radio host, Constitution Party nominee for vice president in 2004 and for president in 2008
- John Bohlinger, former lieutenant governor of Montana (ran as a Democrat)
- Tim Fox, attorney general of Montana
- Rick Hill, former U.S. representative and nominee for governor in 2012
- Krayton Kerns, state representative
- Marc Racicot, former governor of Montana
- Denny Rehberg, former U.S. representative, former lieutenant governor and nominee for the U.S. Senate in 1996 and 2012
- Scott Reichner, state representative (ran for the state senate)
- Matthew Rosendale, state senator (ran for the U.S. House)
- Jon Sonju, state senator and nominee for lieutenant governor in 2012
- Larry R. Williams, author, commodity trader and nominee for the U.S. Senate in 1978 and 1982
- Ryan Zinke, former state senator and candidate for lieutenant governor in 2012 (ran for the U.S. House)

=== Endorsements ===
Steve Daines

Elected officials

- Rick Santorum, former U.S. senator from Pennsylvania and candidate for president of the United States in 2012

Organizations

- Citizens Against Government Waste Political Action Committee (CCAGW PAC)
- Gun Owners of America
- Tea Party Express

=== Polling ===
Poll source	Date(s) administered	Sample size	Margin of error	Steve Daines	Champ Edmunds	Undecided
Public Policy Polling	November 15–17, 2013	469	± 4.5%	66%	7%	27%

Hypothetical polling

Poll source	Date(s) administered	Sample size	Margin of error	Steve Daines	Champ Edmunds	Marc Racicot	Corey Stapleton	Undecided
Harper Polling	April 27–28, 2013	472	± 4.51%	26%	3%	42%	6%	22%
Public Policy Polling	June 21–23, 2013	340	± 5.3%	28%	5%	47%	5%	14%

=== Results ===
Republican primary results
Party	Candidate	Votes	%
Republican	Steve Daines	110,565	83.37%
Republican	Susan Cundiff	11,909	8.98%
Republican	Champ Edmunds	10,151	7.65%
Total votes		132,625	100.00%

== Libertarian nomination ==
=== Candidates ===
==== Declared ====
- Roger Roots, nominee for secretary of state of Montana in 2012

== Independents ==
=== Candidates ===
==== Declined ====
- John Bohlinger, former lieutenant governor of Montana (ran as a Democrat)
- Sam Rankin, real estate broker (did not qualify)

== General election ==
=== Debates ===
- Complete video of debate, October 20, 2014

=== Predictions ===
Source	Ranking	As of
The Cook Political Report	Solid R (flip)	November 3, 2014
Sabato's Crystal Ball	Safe R (flip)	November 3, 2014
Rothenberg Political Report	Safe R (flip)	November 3, 2014
Real Clear Politics	Safe R (flip)	November 3, 2014

=== Polling ===
Poll source	Date(s) administered	Sample size	Margin of error	Steve Daines (R)	Amanda Curtis (D)	Other	Undecided
Rasmussen Reports	August 18–19, 2014	750	± 4%	55%	35%	2%	8%
CBS News/NYT/YouGov	August 18 – September 2, 2014	684	± 5%	53%	35%	1%	11%
Gravis Marketing	September 29–30, 2014	535	± 4%	54%	41%	—	5%
CBS News/NYT/YouGov	September 20 – October 1, 2014	549	± 5%	55%	34%	0%	10%
The MSU-Billings Poll	October 6–11, 2014	410	± 5%	47%	31%	2%	21%
CBS News/NYT/YouGov	October 16–23, 2014	497	± 6%	56%	38%	0%	6%
Gravis Marketing	October 23–24, 2014	604	± 4%	53%	39%	—	8%

Hypothetical polling

With Adams

Poll source	Date(s) administered	Sample size	Margin of error	Dirk Adams (D)	Steve Daines (R)	Other	Undecided
Harper Polling	January 20–22, 2014	519	± 4.3%	20%	44%	—	36%

with Baucus

Poll source	Date(s) administered	Sample size	Margin of error	Max Baucus (D)	Steve Daines (R)	Other	Undecided
Public Policy Polling	February 15–17, 2013	1,011	± 3.1%	44%	49%	—	7%

Poll source	Date(s) administered	Sample size	Margin of error	Max Baucus (D)	Champ Edmunds (R)	Other	Undecided
Public Policy Polling	February 15–17, 2013	1,011	± 3.1%	47%	37%	—	16%

Poll source	Date(s) administered	Sample size	Margin of error	Max Baucus (D)	Tim Fox (R)	Other	Undecided
Public Policy Polling	February 15–17, 2013	1,011	± 3.1%	46%	43%	—	11%

Poll source	Date(s) administered	Sample size	Margin of error	Max Baucus (D)	Marc Racicot (R)	Other	Undecided
Public Policy Polling	February 15–17, 2013	1,011	± 3.1%	42%	47%	—	11%

Poll source	Date(s) administered	Sample size	Margin of error	Max Baucus (D)	Corey Stapleton (R)	Other	Undecided
Public Policy Polling	February 15–17, 2013	1,011	± 3.1%	45%	38%	—	16%

With Bohlinger

Poll source	Date(s) administered	Sample size	Margin of error	John Bohlinger (D)	Steve Daines (R)	Other	Undecided
Public Policy Polling	November 15–17, 2013	952	± 3.2%	36%	51%	—	13%
Harper Polling	January 20–22, 2014	519	± 4.3%	32%	43%	—	25%
Harper Polling	April 7–8, 2014	604	± 4.3%	33%	44%	—	23%

Poll source	Date(s) administered	Sample size	Margin of error	John Bohlinger (D)	Champ Edmunds (R)	Other	Undecided
Public Policy Polling	November 15–17, 2013	952	± 3.2%	37%	39%	—	24%

With Juneau

Poll source	Date(s) administered	Sample size	Margin of error	Denise Juneau (D)	Steve Daines (R)	Other	Undecided
Public Policy Polling	June 21–23, 2013	807	± 3.4%	38%	48%	—	13%

Poll source	Date(s) administered	Sample size	Margin of error	Denise Juneau (D)	Champ Edmunds (R)	Other	Undecided
Public Policy Polling	June 21–23, 2013	807	± 3.4%	41%	34%	—	25%

Poll source	Date(s) administered	Sample size	Margin of error	Denise Juneau (D)	Marc Racicot (R)	Other	Undecided
Public Policy Polling	June 21–23, 2013	807	± 3.4%	37%	52%	—	11%

Poll source	Date(s) administered	Sample size	Margin of error	Denise Juneau (D)	Corey Stapleton (R)	Other	Undecided
Public Policy Polling	June 21–23, 2013	807	± 3.4%	42%	38%	—	21%

With Keenan

Poll source	Date(s) administered	Sample size	Margin of error	Nancy Keenan (D)	Steve Daines (R)	Other	Undecided
Public Policy Polling	February 15–17, 2013	1,011	± 3.1%	39%	49%	—	12%

Poll source	Date(s) administered	Sample size	Margin of error	Nancy Keenan (D)	Champ Edmunds (R)	Other	Undecided
Public Policy Polling	February 15–17, 2013	1,011	± 3.1%	41%	36%	—	23%

Poll source	Date(s) administered	Sample size	Margin of error	Nancy Keenan (D)	Tim Fox (R)	Other	Undecided
Public Policy Polling	February 15–17, 2013	1,011	± 3.1%	40%	45%	—	15%

Poll source	Date(s) administered	Sample size	Margin of error	Nancy Keenan (D)	Marc Racicot (R)	Other	Undecided
Public Policy Polling	February 15–17, 2013	1,011	± 3.1%	38%	50%	—	11%

Poll source	Date(s) administered	Sample size	Margin of error	Nancy Keenan (D)	Corey Stapleton (R)	Other	Undecided
Public Policy Polling	February 15–17, 2013	1,011	± 3.1%	40%	40%	—	20%

With Lindeen

Poll source	Date(s) administered	Sample size	Margin of error	Monica Lindeen (D)	Steve Daines (R)	Other	Undecided
Public Policy Polling	June 21–23, 2013	807	± 3.4%	37%	49%	—	14%

Poll source	Date(s) administered	Sample size	Margin of error	Monica Lindeen (D)	Champ Edmunds (R)	Other	Undecided
Public Policy Polling	June 21–23, 2013	807	± 3.4%	39%	34%	—	26%

Poll source	Date(s) administered	Sample size	Margin of error	Monica Lindeen (D)	Marc Racicot (R)	Other	Undecided
Public Policy Polling	June 21–23, 2013	807	± 3.4%	35%	52%	—	13%

Poll source	Date(s) administered	Sample size	Margin of error	Monica Lindeen (D)	Corey Stapleton (R)	Other	Undecided
Public Policy Polling	June 21–23, 2013	807	± 3.4%	39%	37%	—	24%

With Schweitzer

Poll source	Date(s) administered	Sample size	Margin of error	Brian Schweitzer (D)	Steve Daines (R)	Other	Undecided
Public Policy Polling	February 15–17, 2013	1,011	± 3.1%	48%	45%	—	7%
Harper Polling	April 27–28, 2013	771	± 3.53%	50%	40%	—	10%
Public Policy Polling	June 21–23, 2013	807	± 3.4%	48%	45%	—	7%

Poll source	Date(s) administered	Sample size	Margin of error	Brian Schweitzer (D)	Champ Edmunds (R)	Other	Undecided
Public Policy Polling	February 15–17, 2013	1,011	± 3.1%	52%	37%	—	12%
Public Policy Polling	June 21–23, 2013	807	± 3.4%	52%	37%	—	11%

Poll source	Date(s) administered	Sample size	Margin of error	Brian Schweitzer (D)	Tim Fox (R)	Other	Undecided
Public Policy Polling	February 15–17, 2013	1,011	± 3.1%	49%	43%	—	8%

Poll source	Date(s) administered	Sample size	Margin of error	Brian Schweitzer (D)	Marc Racicot (R)	Other	Undecided
Public Policy Polling	February 15–17, 2013	1,011	± 3.1%	45%	46%	—	9%
Harper Polling	April 27–28, 2013	771	± 3.53%	47%	43%	—	10%
Public Policy Polling	June 21–23, 2013	807	± 3.4%	46%	47%	—	6%

Poll source	Date(s) administered	Sample size	Margin of error	Brian Schweitzer (D)	Corey Stapleton (R)	Other	Undecided
Public Policy Polling	February 15–17, 2013	1,011	± 3.1%	49%	39%	—	13%
Public Policy Polling	June 21–23, 2013	807	± 3.4%	52%	38%	—	10%

With Walsh

Poll source	Date(s) administered	Sample size	Margin of error	John Walsh (D)	Steve Daines (R)	Other	Undecided
Public Policy Polling	November 15–17, 2013	952	± 3.2%	35%	52%	—	13%
Harper Polling	January 20–22, 2014	519	± 4.3%	29%	43%	—	28%
Rasmussen Reports	March 17–18, 2014	750	± 4%	37%	51%	4%	9%
Magellan Strategies	April 1–2, 2014	2,490	± 1.96%	36%	49%	9%	6%
Harper Polling	April 7–8, 2014	604	± 4.3%	35%	42%	—	23%
Hickman Analytics	April 24–30, 2014	400	± 4.9%	37%	49%	—	14%
Vox Populi Polling	May 21–22, 2014	806	± 3.5%	33%	56%	—	11%
Magellan Strategies	June 4–5, 2014	761	± 3.57%	39%	55%	—	6%
Rasmussen Reports	June 9–10, 2014	750	± 4%	35%	53%	3%	9%
Public Policy Polling	July 17–18, 2014	574	± 4.1%	39%	46%	—	15%
Gravis Marketing	July 20–22, 2014	741	± 4%	41%	45%	6%	7%
CBS News/NYT/YouGov	July 5–24, 2014	838	± 3.6%	39%	55%	2%	4%
Gravis Marketing	July 24, 2014	781	± 3.5%	38%	45%	9%	8%
Vox Populi Polling	August 3–4, 2014	798	± 3.5%	34%	47%	—	18%

Poll source	Date(s) administered	Sample size	Margin of error	John Walsh (D)	Champ Edmunds (R)	Other	Undecided
Public Policy Polling	November 15–17, 2013	952	± 3.2%	36%	38%	—	26%

=== Results ===
United States Senate election in Montana, 2014
Party	Candidate	Votes	%	±%
Republican	Steve Daines	213,709	57.79%	+30.71%
Democratic	Amanda Curtis	148,184	40.07%	−32.85%
Libertarian	Roger Roots	7,933	2.14%	N/A
Total votes		369,826	100.00%	N/A
Republican gain from Democratic				

==== Counties that flipped from Democratic to Republican ====
- Beaverhead (largest city: Dillon)
- Broadwater (largest city: Townsend)
- Carbon (largest city: Red Lodge)
- Carter (largest city: Ekalaka)
- Cascade (largest city: Great Falls)
- Custer (largest city: Miles City)
- Daniels (largest city: Scobey)
- Fallon (largest city: Baker)
- Fergus (largest city: Lewistown)
- Flathead (largest city: Kalispell)
- Garfield (largest city: Jordan)
- Golden Valley (largest city: Ryegate)
- Granite (largest city: Philipsburg)
- Hill (largest city: Havre)
- Jefferson (largest city: Clancy)
- Judith Basin (largest city: Stanford)
- Lewis and Clark (largest city: Helena)
- Liberty (largest city: Chester)
- Lincoln (largest city: Libby)
- Madison (largest city: Ennis)
- McCone (largest city: Circle)
- Meagher (largest city: White Sulphur Springs)
- Musselshell (largest city: Roundup)
- Park (largest city: Livingston)
- Petroleum (largest city: Winnett)
- Phillips (largest city: Malta)
- Pondera (largest city: Conrad)
- Powder River (largest city: Broadus)
- Powell (largest city: Deer Lodge)
- Prairie (largest city: Terry)
- Ravalli (largest city: Hamilton)
- Richland (largest city: Sidney)
- Rosebud (largest city: Colstrip)
- Roosevelt (largest city: Wolf Point)
- Dawson (largest city: Glendive)
- Mineral (largest city: Superior)
- Sheridan (largest city: Plentywood)
- Gallatin (largest city: Bozeman)
- Lake (largest city: Polson)
- Chouteau (largest municipality: Fort Benton)
- Yellowstone (largest municipality: Billings)
- Sanders (largest city: Thompson Falls)
- Stillwater (largest city: Columbus)
- Sweet Grass (largest city: Big Timber)
- Teton (largest city: Choteau)
- Toole (largest city: Shelby)
- Treasure (largest city: Hysham)
- Valley (largest city: Glasgow)
- Wheatland (largest city: Harlowton)
- Wibaux (largest city: Wibaux)

== See also ==
- 2014 United States House of Representatives election in Montana
- 2014 United States Senate elections
- 2014 United States elections
