= Steve Daines =

American politician and businessman (born 1962)

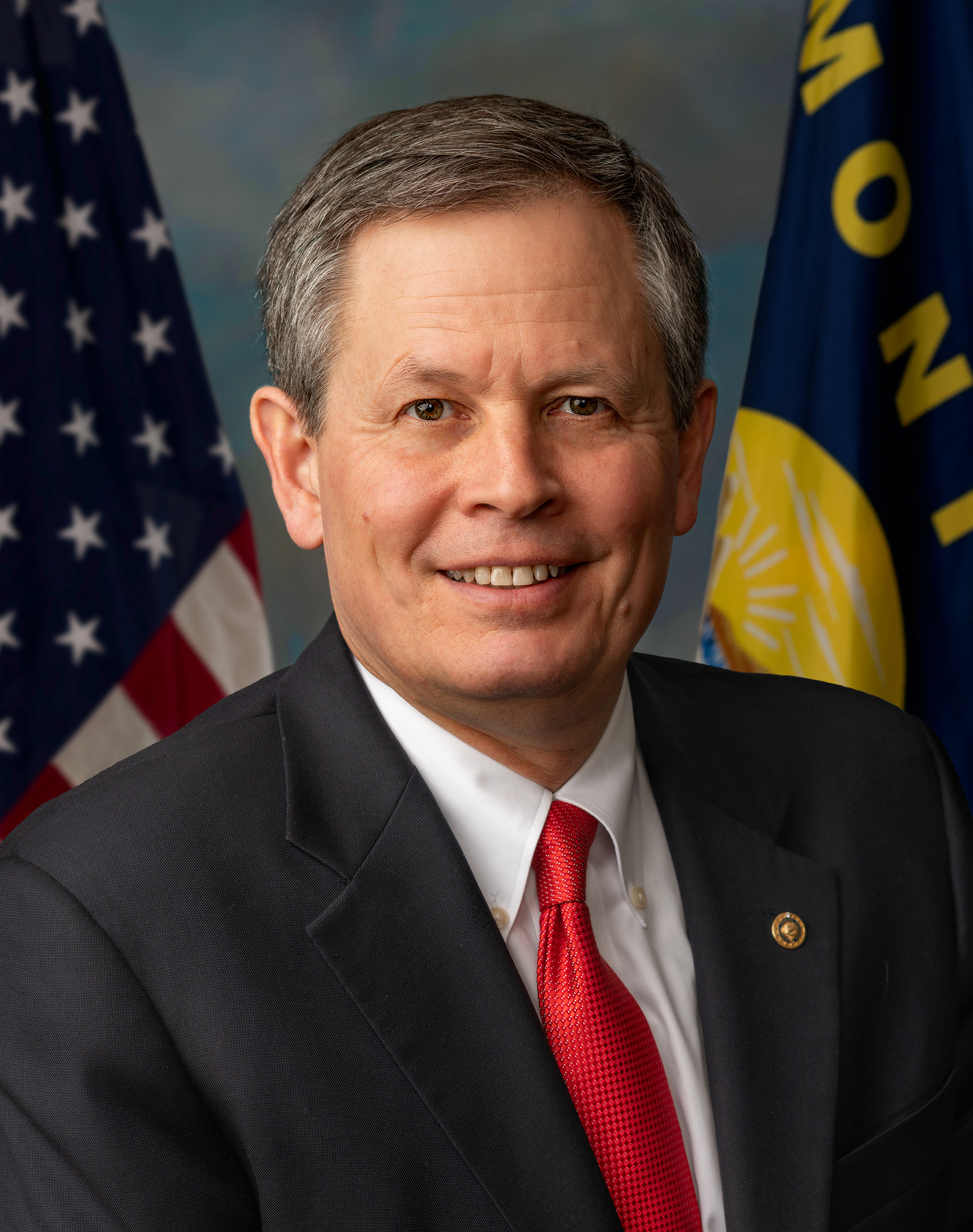
- Official portrait, 2019

United States Senator from Montana
- Incumbent
- Assumed office January 3, 2015 Serving with Tim Sheehy
- Preceded by: John Walsh

Chair of the National Republican Senatorial Committee
- In office January 3, 2023 – January 3, 2025
- Leader: Mitch McConnell
- Preceded by: Rick Scott
- Succeeded by: Tim Scott

Member of the U.S. House of Representatives from Montana's at-large district
- In office January 3, 2013 – January 3, 2015
- Preceded by: Denny Rehberg
- Succeeded by: Ryan Zinke

Personal details
- Born: Steven David Daines; August 20, 1962 (age 64) Los Angeles, California, U.S.
- Party: Republican
- Spouse: Cindy Daines (m. 1986)
- Children: 4
- Relatives: Jay Owenhouse (brother-in-law)
- Education: Montana State University (BS)
- Website: Senate website Campaign website
- Daines's voice Daines supporting the 2015 Energy Policy Modernization Act. Recorded April 19, 2016

Steven David Daines (/ˈdeɪnz/ DAYNZ; born August 20, 1962) is an American politician and businessman serving as the senior United States senator from Montana, a seat he has held since 2015. He is the first Republican Class II senator from Montana in 102 years. Daines represented Montana's at-large congressional district in the U.S. House of Representatives from 2013 to 2015.

Daines was born in Los Angeles and grew up in Bozeman, Montana. Before entering politics, he held positions at Procter & Gamble and the Montana-based software service RightNow Technologies. After an unsuccessful lieutenant governor's race in 2008, Daines was elected to represent Montana's at-large congressional district in Congress in 2012.

Daines was elected to the Senate in 2014, becoming the first Republican to win a U.S. Senate seat in Montana in the 21st century. He was reelected in 2020, defeating the Democratic nominee, incumbent governor Steve Bullock. In 2023, Daines became chairman of the National Republican Senatorial Committee, succeeding Rick Scott. Republicans gained four Senate seats in the 2024 election cycle and won a majority in the chamber. Daines became Montana's senior senator and dean of Montana's congressional delegation in 2025, after Jon Tester was not reelected.

On March 4, 2026, minutes before the filing deadline to run for the Senate in Montana, Daines unexpectedly announced he would not run for reelection in 2026. He will be succeeded by fellow Republican Kurt Alme, who won the election.

== Early life and education ==
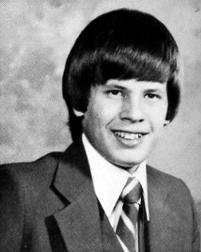
Daines's 1980 high school portrait

Daines was born in the Van Nuys neighborhood of Los Angeles to Sharon R. and Clair W. Daines. The family moved to Montana in 1964. He was raised in Bozeman, where he attended school from kindergarten through college.

Daines graduated from Bozeman High School, where he served as student body president and participated in policy debate; his partner was future U.S. Ambassador to Russia Michael McFaul. He earned a Bachelor of Science degree in chemical engineering from Montana State University. At Montana State, he became a brother of the Sigma Nu fraternity.

== Early career ==
Daines was one of the youngest delegates at the 1984 Republican National Convention. "I was a big fan of Ronald Reagan. He was the first president I got to vote for," he has said. Daines was also the president of MSU College Republicans. In 2007, he and his wife started a website, GiveItBack.com, which urged governor Brian Schweitzer to return the state's $1 billion surplus to taxpayers. From 2007 to 2008, he was Montana state chairman for the Mike Huckabee 2008 presidential campaign and a national surrogate for Huckabee.

Daines spent 13 years with Procter & Gamble. After seven years managing operations in the United States, he and his family moved to Hong Kong and mainland China for six years, opening factories to expand Procter & Gamble's Asian business. During his 2014 Senate campaign, Democratic opponents alleged that Daines had outsourced U.S. jobs to China. He stated that he created hundreds of jobs in Montana when he worked for RightNow Technologies.

In 1997, Daines left Procter & Gamble to join the family construction business in Bozeman. Three years later, he met Greg Gianforte, founder of RightNow Technologies, and was put in charge of running RightNow's customer care division. Daines went on to become vice president of North America Sales and vice president of the Asia-Pacific division. During his tenure, the cloud-based software company became publicly traded and Bozeman's largest commercial employer. Daines remained with the company until March 2012, when he left to campaign for Congress full-time.

=== 2008 gubernatorial election ===
Daines ran for lieutenant governor of Montana in 2008 with Roy Brown, the Republican nominee for governor. They challenged incumbent Democratic Governor Brian Schweitzer and his running mate John Bohlinger. Brown and Daines lost the election 65% to 33%, winning only 7 of Montana's 56 counties.

== U.S. House of Representatives ==
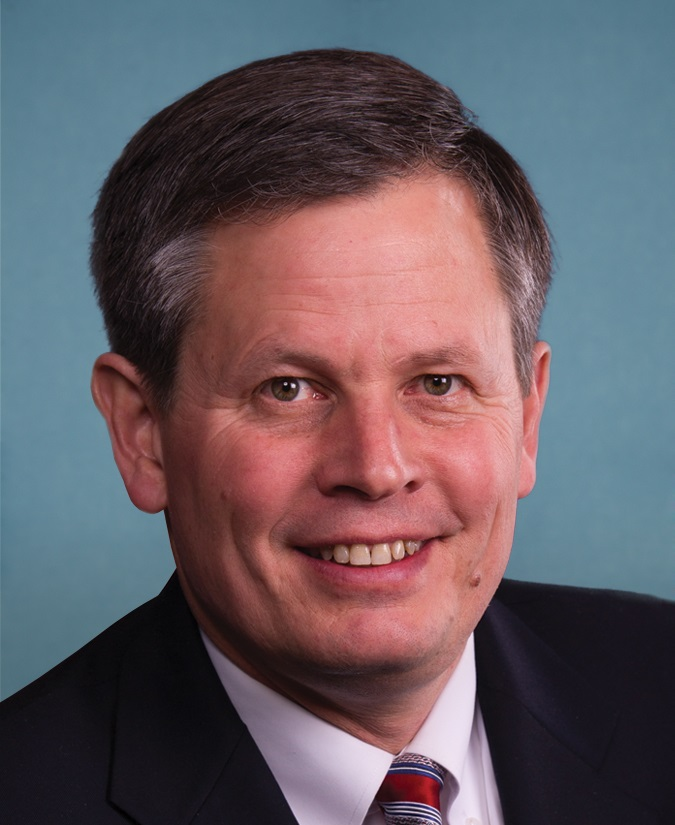
Daines during the 113th Congress

=== 2012 election ===
On November 13, 2010, Daines announced he would run for the U.S. Senate seat held by Jon Tester in 2012.

When U.S. Representative Denny Rehberg announced his intention to challenge Tester, Daines dropped out of the Senate race and announced his candidacy for the House seat Rehberg was vacating. He won the three-way Republican primary with 71% of the vote. In the general election, Daines defeated Democratic state senator Kim Gillan, 53% to 43%. He won 48 of the state's 56 counties.

=== House tenure ===
On June 5, 2013, Daines introduced the North Fork Watershed Protection Act of 2013, which would withdraw 430,000 acres of federal lands in Montana from programs to develop geothermal and mineral resources. The law would forbid mountaintop removal mining and other natural resource development. The affected lands lie adjacent to Glacier National Park and already had some protections. Daines emphasized his desire "to rise above partisan politics, preserve the pristine landscape, and 'protect this critical watershed'" when he announced that he would be introducing the bill, and said that both conservationists and energy companies supported it. The bill, also supported by Tester and U.S. Senator John Walsh, passed in the House, but Senate Republicans prevented it from being voted on.

=== Committee assignments ===
- Committee on Homeland Security
  - Subcommittee on Cybersecurity, Infrastructure Protection, and Security Technologies
  - Subcommittee on Oversight, Investigations, and Management
- Committee on Natural Resources
  - Subcommittee on Energy and Mineral Resources
  - Subcommittee on Indian and Alaska Native Affairs
  - Subcommittee on Public Lands and Environmental Regulation
- Committee on Transportation and Infrastructure
  - Subcommittee on Aviation
  - Subcommittee on Highways and Transit

=== Caucus memberships ===
- Congressional Western Caucus
- Congressional Rural Caucus
- Republican Study Committee
- NW Energy Caucus
- Congressional Sportsmen's Caucus
- Pro-Life Caucus
- Congressional Coalition on Adoption
- Senate Taiwan Caucus
- Rare Disease Caucus

== U.S. Senate ==
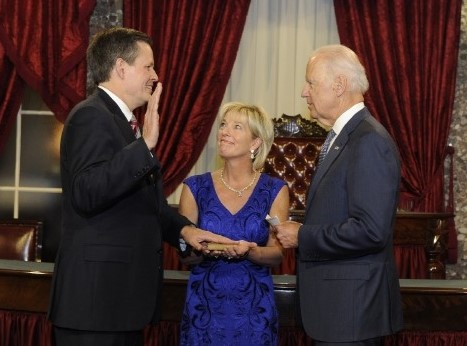
Daines being sworn in as a U.S. Senator by vice president Joe Biden at the convening of the 114th Congress

=== 2014 election ===
In July 2013, Daines attended a NRSC fundraiser in Washington, prompting speculation that he would run for Max Baucus's soon to be vacant U.S. Senate seat. In the second quarter of 2013, he disclosed raising $415,000 in campaign funds, fueling more speculation. On November 6, 2013, Daines announced his candidacy.

In February 2014, Baucus resigned from the Senate to accept a post as U.S. ambassador to China. Governor Steve Bullock, a Democrat, appointed then-lieutenant governor John Walsh to the vacant Senate seat for the remainder of Baucus's term. Walsh had already declared his intention to run for the Senate in 2014, and it was suggested that his appointment might give him the advantage of incumbency, improving Democratic chances of holding the seat.

Daines won the Republican primary on June 3, 2014, with 83.4% of the vote against Missoula state representative Champ Edmunds and political newcomer Susan Cundiff. Walsh won the Democratic primary with 64% of the vote.

In August 2014, Walsh withdrew from the race following the publication of a New York Times article that accused him of plagiarism in a paper written as part of his master's degree work at the U.S. Army War College. With only 50 days until the election, a special convention called by the Montana Democratic party nominated State Representative Amanda Curtis.

Daines won the general election with 57.8% of the vote to Curtis's 40.1%.

=== 2020 election ===
Daines was reelected in 2020, defeating Bullock with 55% of the vote. Democrats outspent Republicans by $19 million on the race, $82–63 million; it was one of the most expensive Senate races in the 2020 cycle.

=== Senate tenure ===
==== 114th Congress (2015–2017) ====
In April 2016, Daines signed on to the Restoring Healthy Forests for Healthy Communities Act, legislation to address the expiration of the Secure Rural Schools program by renewing the federal government's commitment to manage forest resources.

==== 115th Congress (2017–2019) ====
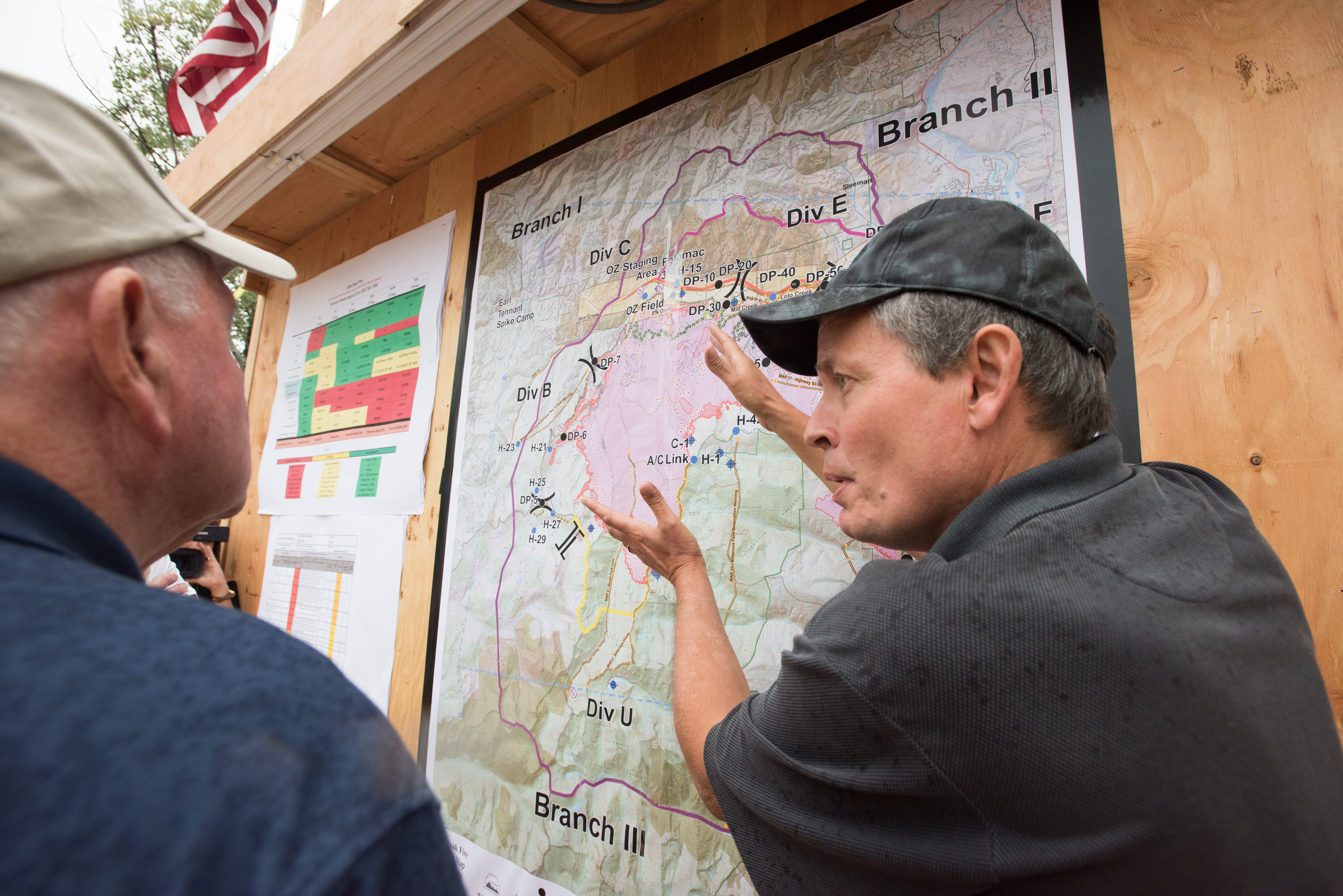
Daines visiting the aftermath of the Lolo Peak Fire, August 2017

In January 2017, Daines announced his support of Executive Order 13769, ordered by President Trump, which imposed a temporary ban on entry to the U.S. to citizens of seven Muslim-majority countries.

In August 2017, Daines co-sponsored the Israel Anti-Boycott Act (s. 720), which made it a federal crime, punishable by a maximum of 20 years in prison, for Americans to encourage or participate in boycotts against Israel and Israeli settlements in the occupied Palestinian territories if protesting actions by the Israeli government.

In May 2018, Daines announced his support for the so-called nuclear option "to speed up consideration of President Trump's judicial nominees". He has argued that changing the Senate's rules to a simple majority vote would "ensure a quicker pace on Trump's court picks".

During Brett Kavanaugh's Supreme Court nomination in October 2018, Daines, who supported the nomination, was absent during the vote due to his attendance at his daughter's wedding that day; Senator Lisa Murkowski, who opposed Kavanaugh's confirmation, voted "present" to compensate for Daines's absence.

==== 116th Congress (2019–2021) ====
In the 2018–2019 United States federal government shutdown, when Congress would not meet Trump's demand for $5.7 billion in federal funds for a U.S.–Mexico border wall, Daines voted for a bill that put $5.7 billion toward the border wall and against a bill that would have funded the government without putting resources toward a wall.

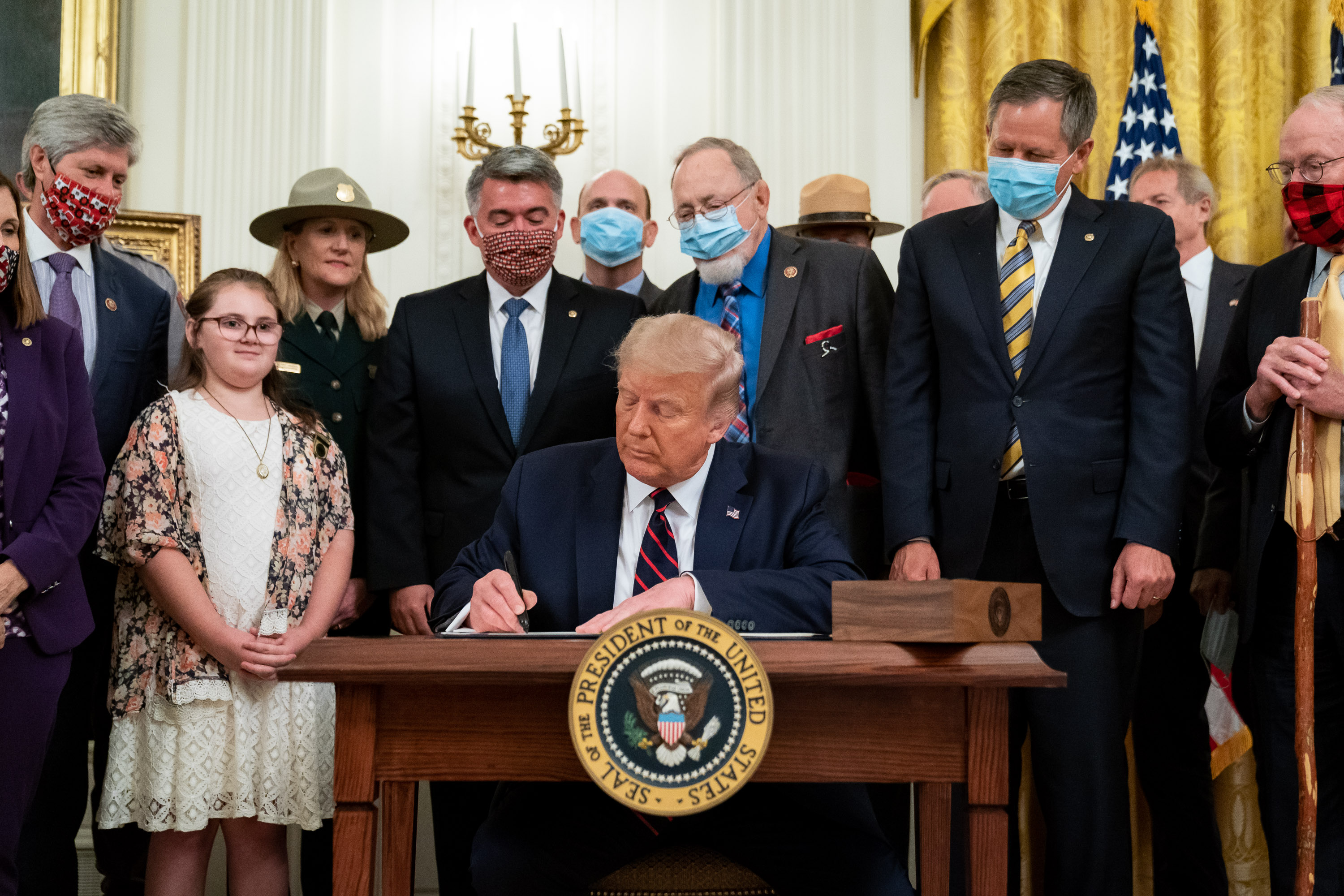
Daines watching President Donald Trump sign into law the Great American Outdoors Act on August 4, 2020

In January 2019, Daines was one of 11 Republican senators to vote to advance legislation intended to block Trump's lifting of sanctions against three Russian companies. In June 2019, he was one of 8 senators to sign a letter to Premier of British Columbia John Horgan expressing concern over "the lack of oversight of Canadian mining projects near multiple transboundary rivers that originate in British Columbia and flow into" Alaska, Idaho, Washington, and Montana. The senators requested that British Columbia replicate American efforts to protect watersheds.

Daines voted to acquit Trump in his impeachment trial on charges of abuse of power and obstruction of Congress related to his request that Ukraine announce an investigation into Joe Biden, which became known as the Trump–Ukraine scandal. He said Trump had not committed a crime, that Democrats had "not done their complete homework", and that it was the most partisan impeachment trial in history. Daines said the purpose of the impeachment was to "[overturn] the election of 2016 and [try] to define the election of 2020". During the trial, he voted not to hear witnesses and to block the Senate from subpoenaing documents from the White House.

In June 2020, Daines argued against statehood for the District of Columbia, saying that most Americans oppose statehood for the U.S. capital and suggesting that members of Congress "get out of this city, go out to where the real people are at across our country and ask them what they think." Critics objected to his implication that D.C., a city of more than 705,000, nearly half of whom are Black, are not "real people". Further pressed, Daines explained that people outside the D.C. "bubble" oppose statehood, while those in D.C. support it.

==== 117th Congress (2021–2023) ====
Before the 2021 United States Electoral College vote count, Daines said he would object to certifying the electoral count over unsubstantiated claims of voter fraud. He was participating in the certification when Trump supporters stormed the U.S. Capitol. During the attack, he tweeted "I condemn any kind of violence and intimidation. This is unacceptable." Daines changed his mind on objecting to the certification during the attack. He also called the attack "a sad day for our country" and said, "destruction and violence we saw at our Capitol today is an assault on our democracy, our Constitution and the rule of law, and must not be tolerated." He called for a peaceful transfer of power. The Billings Gazette electoral board called for Daines to apologize to Joe Biden for his role in opposing the certification. Daines rejected calls for Trump to resign or be impeached in the wake of the attack.

During the Biden administration, Daines sought to block Deb Haaland's nomination as Interior Secretary.

On November 16, 2022, Daines was elected chairman of the National Republican Senatorial Committee, succeeding Rick Scott.

==== 118th Congress (2023–2025) and 119th Congress (2025–2027) ====
In March 2026, moments before the filing deadline, Daines announced that he would not run for reelection. Minutes earlier, Montana's top federal prosecutor, Kurt Alme, filed to run; Daines then immediately endorsed Alme in a coordinated effort by the two men to ensure Alme succeeded Daines. This was condemned by Democrats and some Republicans.

=== Committee assignments ===
Current

- Committee on Appropriations
  - Subcommittee on Interior, Environment, and Related Agencies
  - Subcommittee on State, Foreign Operations, and Related Programs
  - Subcommittee on Transportation, Housing and Urban Development, and Related Agencies
  - Subcommittee on Financial Services and General Government
- Committee on Energy and Natural Resources
  - Subcommittee on Energy
  - Subcommittee on Public Lands, Forests and Mining
- Committee on Finance
  - Subcommittee on Energy, Natural Resources, and Infrastructure
  - Subcommittee on Health Care
  - Subcommittee on International Trade, Customs, and Global Competitiveness
- Committee on Indian Affairs

Previous

- Committee on Commerce, Science, and Transportation (2015–2017)
- Committee on Agriculture, Nutrition, and Forestry (2017–2019)
- Committee on Homeland Security and Governmental Affairs (2017–2019)

== Political positions ==
=== Abortion ===
Daines opposes legalized abortion except to protect the life of the mother.

=== Budget and taxes ===
Daines introduced his first bill, the Balanced Budget Accountability Act in February 2013. The bill would have required members of Congress to pass a budget that would balance in 10 years or have their pay terminated. Daines supported the No Budget, No Pay Act of 2013, which would put members of Congress's salaries in an escrow account unless they passed a budget by April 15, 2013.

Daines has opposed an internet sales tax, which would allow states to collect taxes on online sales. He has called legislation to provide the authority "a job-killing tax hike that hurts American small businesses".

=== China ===
Initially a supporter of U.S.-China relations, Daines later became a China critic after Trump "blamed Beijing for the COVID-19 pandemic." Under the second Trump administration, Daines emerged as a important backchannel figure between China and the United States. In March 2025, he visited China, where he met with Chinese Premier Li Qiang. In May 2026, he led a five-member bipartisan delegation to China. He visited China again in August 2026, where he visited Hangzhou and Guangzhou. In Hangzhou, he visited Zhejiang University, Bota, Manycore Tech, and Star Vision. In Guangzhou, he visited EHang. On 24 September 2026, he was the only U.S. senator to attend the state dinner during Chinese leader Xi Jinping's state visit to the United States. On 30 September, he also attended the National Day celebrations at the Chinese embassy in Washington, D.C., where he was pictured sitting next to Chinese ambassador Xie Feng. In October, he told South China Morning Post, "it's really important to keep the dialogue going on between two countries because both sides admit we've got some serious differences. But the answer is not to retreat. The answer is to stay engaged".

=== Support for Donald Trump ===
According to the Helena Independent Record, Daines had by 2020 "aggressively tied himself to Trump, both backing and defending the president over the last three years". During Trump's presidency, Daines voted with Trump's stated public policy positions 86% of the time.

Daines was supportive of Trump's response to the COVID-19 pandemic.

In June 2020, amid protests against racism and police brutality in the wake of the murder of George Floyd, Daines defended Trump's decision to disperse protestors with a chemical irritant so that he could stage a photo op in front of St. John's Church, saying he was "grateful for the president's leadership".

In October 2020, during the lead-up to his reelection bid, Daines began to shift his rhetoric about Trump.

On January 2, 2021, Daines joined 11 other Republican senators in an attempt to overturn the presidential election results in Arizona and Pennsylvania. Trump and his allies made false claims of fraud in the election. Daines later withdrew his objection to counting the two states' electoral votes.

On May 28, 2021, Daines voted against creating an independent commission to investigate the 2021 United States Capitol attack.

=== Education ===
Daines has proposed abolishing the U.S. Department of Education . In 2019, he co-authored the Academic Partnerships Lead Us to Success Act, a bill that would allow state and local governments to withdraw from federal education requirements.

=== Energy and environment ===
Daines rejects the scientific consensus on climate change. In 2019, he said, "to suggest that [climate change] is human-caused is not a sound scientific conclusion."

Daines criticized President Barack Obama for his administration's positions on natural resource development, calling Obama's 2013 climate change proposal a "job killer" and a "war on American energy". He co-sponsored the Northern Route Approval Act, which would allow for congressional approval of the Keystone pipeline. Daines expressed strong support of Montana's coal industry and oil production in eastern Montana and the Bakken formation.

Daines has called for litigation reforms to allow more logging in Montana's forests. In April 2016, he signed on to the Restoring Healthy Forests for Healthy Communities Act, a bill that would address the expiration of the Secure Rural Schools program by renewing the federal government's commitment to manage forest resources.

In July 2019, Daines co-founded the Roosevelt Conservation Caucus, a group of Republican members of Congress meant to focus on environmental issues with specific priorities including reducing water and ocean plastic pollution, and heightening access to public lands and waters in the United States for outdoor recreation, hunting and fishing.

In February 2021, while Texas was suffering power outages amid a snowstorm, Daines tweeted, "This is a perfect example of the need for reliable energy sources like natural gas & coal" in a criticism of renewable energy such as wind turbines and solar energy. Failures in natural gas, coal, and nuclear energy systems caused nearly twice as much power outage as frozen wind turbines and solar panels, though wind power was reduced by a far higher percentage.

In November 2021, Daines criticized the Biden administration for stricter regulations of methane emissions from the oil and natural gas sector (which had signaled that it was open to the Biden administration's regulatory shift).

=== Gun policy ===
Daines opposes gun control legislation. He has signaled opposition to proposals for expanded background checks and red flag laws, saying he does not believe such legislation would reduce gun violence.

=== Health care ===
In 2017, Daines voted to repeal the Affordable Care Act (also known as Obamacare).

=== Immigration ===
Daines opposes allowing Deferred Action for Childhood Arrivals (DACA) recipients to apply for temporary protection to stay in the United States; he believes the program is an executive overreach.

Daines supported Trump's 2017 executive order to impose a temporary ban on entry to the U.S. to citizens of seven Muslim-majority countries.

=== Internet and technology ===
Daines opposes net neutrality and praised its 2017 repeal by the Federal Communications Commission (FCC). In May 2018, he voted against a bill that would overturn the FCC's ruling and restore net neutrality.

In May 2020, Daines and Ron Wyden co-sponsored an amendment that would have required federal law enforcement and intelligence agencies to obtain federal court warrants when collecting web search engine data from American citizens, nationals, or residents under the Foreign Intelligence Surveillance Act (FISA).

=== Iran ===
In January 2020, Daines expressed support for the US military's assassination of Iranian major general Qasem Soleimani by drone strike at the Baghdad International Airport.

=== Judiciary ===
In September 2020, after Justice Ruth Bader Ginsburg's death, Daines supported moving forward with Trump's nominee to fill the vacancy on the court before the November presidential election. He tweeted that he wanted to "protect our Montana way of life". In March 2016, after Justice Antonin Scalia's death, Daines said Obama's nominee to the Supreme Court should not be considered, as the "American people have already begun voting on who the next president will be" and Americans should "have their voices heard" via the 2016 election.

=== LGBT rights ===
Daines opposes same-sex marriage and said he was "disappointed" in the Supreme Court's decision that same-sex marriage bans are unconstitutional.

== Personal life ==
Daines and his wife have four children. He enjoys mountain-climbing and has scaled Granite Peak and Grand Teton.

Daines is a Presbyterian.

== Electoral history ==
2008 Montana gubernatorial election – Republican primary
Party	Candidates	Votes	%	+%
Republican	Roy Brown/Steve Daines	65,883	80.81%	
Republican	Larry Steele/Harold Luce	15,643	19.19%	

2008 Montana gubernatorial election
Party	Candidates	Votes	%	+%
Democratic	Brian Schweitzer (incumbent)/John Bohlinger (incumbent)	318,670	65.47%	
Republican	Roy Brown/Steve Daines	158,268	32.52%	
Libertarian	Stan Jones/Michael Baker	9,796	2.01%	

2012 Montana's at-large congressional district election – Republican primary
Party	Candidate	Votes	%	+%
Republican	Steve Daines	82,843	71.25%	
Republican	Eric Brosten	21,012	18.07%	
Republican	Vincent Melkus	12,420	10.68%	

2012 Montana's at-large congressional district election
Party	Candidate	Votes	%	+%
Republican	Steve Daines	255,468	53.25%	
Democratic	Kim Gillan	204,939	42.72%	
Libertarian	David Kaiser	19,333	4.03%	

2014 U.S. Senate election in Montana – Republican primary
Party	Candidate	Votes	%	+%
Republican	Steve Daines	110,565	83.37%	
Republican	Susan Cundiff	11,909	8.98%	
Republican	Champ Edmunds	10,151	7.65%	

2014 U.S. Senate election in Montana
Party	Candidate	Votes	%	+%
Republican	Steve Daines	213,709	57.79%	
Democratic	Amanda Curtis	148,184	40.07%	
Libertarian	Roger Roots	7,933	2.15%	

2020 U.S. Senate election in Montana
Party	Candidate	Votes	%	+%
Republican	Steve Daines (incumbent)	333,237	55.01%	
Democratic	Steve Bullock	272,531	44.99%	

U.S. House of Representatives
Preceded by Denny Rehberg	Member of the U.S. House of Representatives from Montana's at-large congressional district 2013–2015	Succeeded by Ryan Zinke
Party political offices
Preceded by Dave Lewis	Republican nominee for Lieutenant Governor of Montana; 2008	Succeeded by Jon Sonju
Preceded by Robert Kelleher	Republican nominee for U.S. Senator from Montana (Class 2); 2014, 2020	Succeeded by Kurt Alme
Preceded by Rick Scott	Chair of the National Republican Senatorial Committee; 2023–2025	Succeeded by Tim Scott
U.S. Senate
Preceded by John Walsh	U.S. Senator (Class 2) from Montana; 2015–present Served alongside: Jon Tester, Tim Sheehy	Incumbent
U.S. order of precedence (ceremonial)
Preceded by Mike Rounds	Order of precedence of the United States as United States Senator	Succeeded by James Lankford
Preceded by Tom Cotton	United States senators by seniority 51st	Succeeded by Mike Rounds
