= Neil Livingstone =

American business executive and author (born 1946)

Neil C. Livingstone
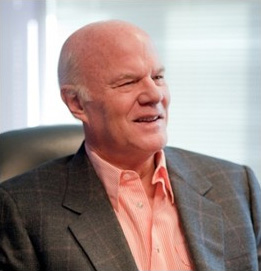
- Born: Neil C. Livingstone; August 3, 1946 (age 80); Helena, Montana, United States
- Education: College of William and Mary in Virginia, University of Montana, Fletcher School of Law and Diplomacy
- Occupations: Business executive, author, commentator, security and terrorism expert
- Known for: Predicting the attacks on the World Trade Center in New York
- Political party: Republican

Neil C. Livingstone (born August 3, 1946) is an American business executive, author, political candidate, television commentator and security and terrorism expert. He was the founder, chairman, and CEO of GlobalOptions Inc., an international risk management company that he took public in 2005.

He is the author of ten books and hundreds of articles on terrorism, intelligence, and national security. He is a frequent commentator on national security issues.

In summer 2001, he and two other security specialists filming an MSNBC special predicted the attacks on the World Trade Center in New York, saying that both buildings would be destroyed and that Osama bin Laden would be behind the attacks.

Livingstone ran unsuccessfully for the Republican nomination for Governor of Montana in the 2012 election. His running mate was State Senator Ryan Zinke. The Livingstone/Zinke ticket finished fifth out of seven in the Republican primary with 12,038 votes (8.8% of the vote). Because of his background, Livingstone received significant attention and was dubbed "The Most Interesting Gubernatorial Candidate in the World.

== Publications ==
Livingstone is the author of ten books:

- Inside the PLO (Morrow)
- The War Against Terrorism (Lexington)
- Corporate Equalizer (Institute for Prosperity and Security)
- Protect Yourself in an Uncertain World (Lexington)
- Beyond the Iran-Contra Crisis (Lexington)
- Rescue My Child (Simon & Schuster)
- America the Vulnerable: The Threat of Chemical/Biological Warfare (Lexington)
- The Cult of Counterterrorism (Lexington)
- The Complete Security Guide for Executives (Lexington)
- Fighting Back: Winning the War Against Terrorism (Lexington)
