= Jay Owenhouse =

American Magician and Illusionist

- Born: August 10, 1963 (age 62); Alameda County, California, U.S.
- Occupation: Illusionist
- Parent(s): James W. Owenhouse; Ella May Owenhouse

Jay Owenhouse (born August 10, 1963) is an American illusionist who operates the second largest touring magic show in the United States. He is known for his work with tigers and his performances of famous illusions originally done by Harry Houdini. Notably he has performed a version of the Suspended Straitjacket Escape with the addition of spiked jaws that slam shut after two minutes.

== Early life and education ==
Owenhouse was born in Alameda County, California, to James W. Owenhouse and Ella May Owenhouse (née Wilcox) on August 10, 1963. At four years old, Owenhouse saw a magician perform for the first time at a birthday party. He performed his first show at age 14, and soon after, he met his friend and mentor, magician Doug Henning. Jay's early experience with magic grew into a passion for the craft and, as a teenager growing up in northern California, Owenhouse began performing magic shows of his own at shopping malls, elementary schools and birthday parties.

After finishing high school, Owenhouse moved to Bozeman, Montana, to attend Montana State University where he studied psychology and began designing his own illusions. While attending college, Owenhouse met his future wife Susan Daines, whom he married on July 24, 1987. Following his graduation from Montana State University in 1990, Owenhouse founded Owenhouse & Associates to pursue a career in magic.

== Television appearances ==
Owenhouse has appeared on Fox's Magic on the Edge, where he performed his Water Torture Cell illusion, and the original Masters of Illusion TV series with Harry Blackstone Jr.

== Personal life ==
Owenhouse lives in Bozeman, Montana, with his four children, John, Peter, Juliana and Christina, and two tigers, Sheena and Shekinah. His wife of 22 years, Susan Daines, sister of United States Senator Steve Daines, died of primary sclerosis cholangitis on April 13, 2009.
