= National Parks Conservation Association =

American non-profit organization

- Founded: May 19, 1919 (107 years ago)
- Founder: Stephen Mather et al.
- Purpose: Protecting the US National Park System
- Location: Washington, D.C.
- Region served: United States
- Members: Over 1,000,000
- Revenue: US$34,515,625
- Employees: 153
- Website: www.npca.org
- Formerly called: National Parks and Conservation Association (1970–2002)

The National Parks Conservation Association (NPCA) is an independent, nonpartisan organization devoted to advocacy on behalf of the National Parks System.

== History ==
Founded in 1919 as the National Parks Association, the organization was designed to be a citizen's watchdog for the National Park Service (NPS) created in 1916. Among the founders of NPA was Stephen Mather, the first director of the National Park Service. Robert Sterling Yard was NPA's first employee. Although Yard received personal financial support from Mather, the two often differed on development issues in the parks. Taking a strong preservationist position, Yard objected to such commercialization of the parks as the jazz bands and bear shows at Yosemite National Park.

The association continued to resist commercial efforts to build dams and promote mining, logging and hunting in the national parks. In 1970, the organization changed its name to the National Parks and Conservation Association, in response to the national attention to a new range of emerging environmental issues, including air and water pollution. This was shortened to National Parks Conservation Association in 2002.

== Activities ==
In pursuit of its core mission to protect the national parks of the United States, the NPCA "works to educate decision-makers and opinion leaders about the most pressing issues facing national parks". At its headquarters in Washington, D.C., and 27 regional offices around the country, it employs 153 staff members, including program and policy experts who work together with committed volunteers, staff lobbyists, community organizers and communications specialists. Under the leadership of President and Chief Executive Officer Theresa Pierno, "the organization's strategic focus is on ensuring that as the leading advocate for national parks these places continue to be protected and have the resources and infrastructure they need to thrive in their second century."

The NPCA publishes a quarterly magazine, National Parks, the print version of which is distributed primarily to its members with a circulation of 320,000 while articles are also available on its website.

== Legislation ==
=== Supported ===
The North Fork Watershed Protection Act of 2013 is a bill that would withdraw 430,000 acres of federal lands in Montana from programs to develop geothermal and mineral resources. The law would forbid mountaintop removal mining and other natural resource development. The affected lands lie adjacent to Glacier National Park and already have some protections. The bill follows up on an agreement between Canada and the United States on how to protect the trans-border area from the effects of mining. In the 2010 agreement, Canada agreed not to do any additional mining on the British Columbian Flathead with the expectation that Montana would do the same thing to its land. The NPCA supported the bill, saying the bill "protects both our outdoor heritage and our economic future for generations to come".

=== Opposed ===
The NPCA opposed the Water Rights Protection Act, a bill that would prevent federal agencies from requiring certain entities to relinquish their water rights to the United States in order to use public lands. According to opponents, the bill is too broad. They believe the bill "could also block federal fisheries agencies like the United States Fish and Wildlife Service from requiring flows that help salmon find fish ladders and safely pass over dams".

In June 2017 the United States Fish and Wildlife Service removed the Grizzly Bear from Yellowstone National Park's "endangered species list". The National Parks Conservation Association is suing the Fish and Wildlife Services for not going through the proper channels in their decision to remove the species from the endangered list, saying that the Fish and Wildlife Service "fails to provide long-term and enforceable regulations to ensure the grizzly population remains stable and is able to increase in both size and geographic scope".

The NPCA opposes the cutting of the Clean Power Plan, which if cut would increase the levels of carbon emissions and sulfur dioxides found in the parks which could lead to potential loss of life in and around the parks. The NPCA is using their strong grassroots base to petition the EPA, its Administrator Scott Pruitt, and the Trump Administration to keep the Clean Power Plan practices.

== Charity ratings and financials ==
The NPCA received an overall 4 star (out of 4) rating from Charity Navigator for fiscal year 2015, based on a score of 100 (out of 100) for Accountability & Finance, and 100 (out of 100) for Culture & Community.

The NCPA received Gold Transparency 2024 by Candid.org.

== See also ==
- Sustainability
- Biodiversity
- Global warming
- Ecology
- Earth science
- Natural environment
- Environmental history of the United States
