= Bring Jobs Home Act =

- Long title: A bill to provide an incentive for businesses to bring jobs back to America.
- Announced in: the 113th United States Congress
- Sponsored by: Sen. John Walsh (D-MT)
- Number of co-sponsors: 24

Legislative history
- Introduced in the Senate as S. 2569 by Sen. John Walsh (D-MT) on July 8, 2014

The Bring Jobs Home Act (S. 2569) is a bill that would amend the Internal Revenue Code to grant business taxpayers a tax credit for up to 20% of insourcing expenses incurred for eliminating a business located outside the United States and relocating it within the United States, and deny a tax deduction for outsourcing expenses incurred in relocating a U.S. business outside the United States.

The bill was introduced into the United States Senate during the 113th United States Congress.

== Background ==
American companies can currently deduct the costs of moving facilities overseas from their taxes, something that would change under this bill.

The text of S. 2569 is identical to a bill written by the Senator Stabenow that failed in the 112th United States Congress.

== Provisions of the bill ==
This summary is based largely on the summary provided by the Congressional Research Service, a public domain source.

The Bring Jobs Home Act would amend the Internal Revenue Code to: (1) grant business taxpayers a tax credit for up to 20% of insourcing expenses incurred for eliminating a business located outside the United States and relocating it within the United States, and (2) deny a tax deduction for outsourcing expenses incurred in relocating a U.S. business outside the United States. The bill would require an increase in the taxpayer's employment of full-time employees in the United States in order to claim the tax credit for insourcing expenses.

== Procedural history ==
The Bring Jobs Home Act was introduced into the United States Senate on July 8, 2014 by Sen. John Walsh (D-MT). Senator Debbie Stabenow (D-MI) was an initial co-sponsor. On July 23, 2014, the Senate voted to advance the bill for consideration in a vote of 93-7.

== Debate and discussion ==
Senator Stabenow said that "we've got to make sure the tax code reflects the right values and policies."

Senator Walsh is considered "one of the most vulnerable incumbents in this election cycle." Walsh has alleged that his opponent was involved in outsourcing. According to Walsh, "it is outrageous that Americans are forced to subsidize corporate decisions to ship jobs overseas."

Senator Harry Reid (D-NV) said that the bill "would end senseless tax breaks for outsourcers" and "would end the absurd practice of American taxpayers bankrolling the outsourcing of their very own jobs."

Senate Minority Leader Mitch McConnell (R-KY) accused the Democrats of only being interested in politics and not in actually encouraging companies to stay in the United States. McConnell pointed to reducing corporate tax rates as a step that would keep businesses in the United States that the Democrats have been unwilling to take. According to McConnell, the bill is "designed for campaign rhetoric and failure - not to create jobs here in the U.S."

The Joint Committee on Taxation reported that the bill would result in the government losing $214 million in revenue over 10 years.

Howard Cleckman on Forbes criticized the bill as a "message bill" that "Democratic sponsors have no interest in making" law because "they merely see it as a way to boost the party's Senate candidates in part by forcing Republicans against something that sounds like a good idea." Cleckman argued that major U.S. firms already pay such low taxes, that any tax credits available for bringing business units back to the United States would be meaningless. He also argues that the bill won't do anything to increasing hiring in the United States because the company can claim the credit with as few as one new job.

== See also ==
- List of bills in the 113th United States Congress
