= John Walsh (Montana politician) =

American former politician (born 1960)

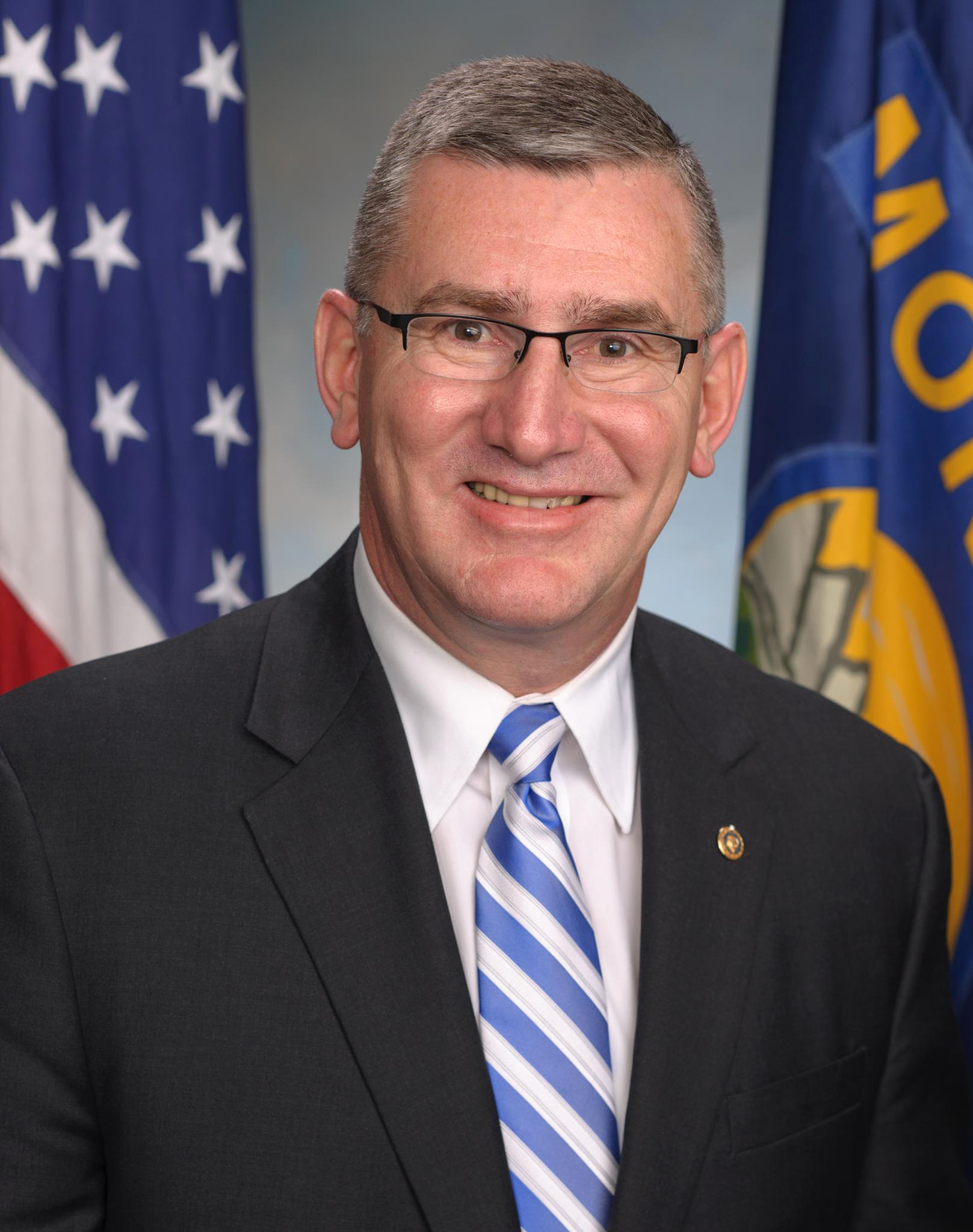
- Official portrait, 2014

United States Senator from Montana
- In office February 9, 2014 – January 3, 2015
- Appointed by: Steve Bullock
- Preceded by: Max Baucus
- Succeeded by: Steve Daines

34th Lieutenant Governor of Montana
- In office January 7, 2013 – February 9, 2014
- Governor: Steve Bullock
- Preceded by: John Bohlinger
- Succeeded by: Angela McLean

26th Adjutant General of Montana
- In office September 1, 2008 – March 2012
- Governor: Brian Schweitzer
- Preceded by: Randall Mosley
- Succeeded by: Matthew T. Quinn

Personal details
- Born: John Edward Walsh; November 3, 1960 (age 66) Butte, Montana, U.S.
- Party: Democratic
- Spouse: Janet Walsh
- Children: 2
- Education: Carroll College (attended); Regents College (BS); United States Army War College (MA, revoked)

Military service
- Branch/service: United States Army
- Years of service: 1979–2012
- Rank: Colonel (U.S. Army); Brigadier General (Montana National Guard)
- Unit: 1st Battalion, 163rd Infantry Regiment; Montana National Guard
- Battles/wars: Iraq War
- Awards: Bronze Star Medal; Combat Infantryman Badge
- Walsh's voice Walsh on the North Fork Watershed Protection Act. Recorded April 3, 2014

John Edward Walsh (born November 3, 1960) is an American real estate agent, former politician, and former military officer who served as a United States Senator from Montana from 2014 to 2015 and as the 34th Lieutenant Governor of Montana from 2013 to 2014 under Governor Steve Bullock. A member of the Democratic Party, he previously served as a colonel in the Army National Guard, the adjutant general of the Montana National Guard with a state commission as a brigadier general from 2008 to 2012.

In October 2013, Walsh announced his candidacy for the U.S. Senate in 2014 to succeed retiring Democratic incumbent Max Baucus. When Baucus resigned prior to the end of his term, Bullock appointed Walsh to fill Baucus's seat. In August 2014, he dropped out of the race after The New York Times reported he had plagiarized portions of a research paper he had written at the Army War College in 2007, resulting in the college revoking his Master's degree. He was succeeded in the Senate by Republican Steve Daines.

From February 2016 to November 2017, Walsh was the state director of Montana's USDA Rural Development office for the United States Department of Agriculture. He then began a career in real estate sales.

== Early life and education ==
Walsh was born on November 3, 1960, in Butte, Montana. He graduated from Butte High School in 1979, and enlisted in the Montana Army National Guard. He began working full-time for the Guard in 1984 and received his commission upon completion of Officer Candidate School in 1987. Walsh met his wife, Janet, while attending college. They have two adult sons.

Walsh is a graduate of the Armor Officer Basic and Advanced Courses, the Combined Arms and Services Staff School, and the United States Army Command and General Staff College. He attended Carroll College and received a Bachelor of Science degree in political science from Regents College of the University of the State of New York (now Excelsior University) in 1990.

Walsh received a master's degree in strategic studies from the United States Army War College in 2007. In July 2014, The New York Times, after receiving a tip from an opposition researcher working for the National Republican Senatorial Committee, reported that Walsh had plagiarized much of a 14-page strategy research paper, a requirement for the degree, with some material directly copied from sources without attribution. Walsh initially denied, then admitted to the allegations, but stated that it was not done intentionally. He claimed he was being treated for PTSD at the time stating, "I don't want to blame my mistake on PTSD, but I do want to say it may have been a factor."

The matter was referred to the College's Academic Review Board. Former governor Brian Schweitzer wrote a letter to the board in support of Walsh, who claimed the plagiarism was unintentional and that he had been on medication for PTSD at the time. On August 22, the board found that Walsh's plagiarism was "egregious" and "intentional" and that the paper was "primarily composed of verbatim liftings from other sources". The board rejected his PTSD defense, noting that other students also struggle with PTSD and other issues but do not plagiarize. An appeal filed by Walsh was denied, and on October 10, 2014 the College revoked Walsh's degree.

== Montana Army National Guard ==
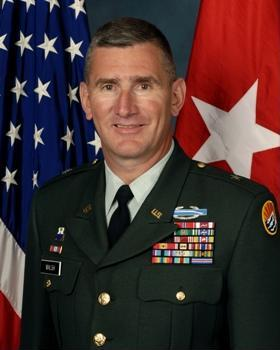
Walsh as Adjutant General of the Montana National Guard

Walsh served in the Montana Army National Guard for 33 years. In this capacity he led 1st Battalion, 163rd Infantry Regiment in combat in Iraq. He earned the Bronze Star Medal and the Combat Infantryman Badge. In 2000, he led operations of over 2,000 Guard members during Montana's wildfires.

In 2008 Walsh was appointed Adjutant General and received a state promotion to brigadier general. He resigned in 2012 to run for Lieutenant Governor, and continued to serve as a traditional Army Guardsman (one weekend drill per month, two weeks of annual training each year). He was appointed by his successor to serve as the Montana National Guard's land component commander, and he served in this position until retiring from the National Guard in December 2012.

A 2010 Army Inspector General report concluded that Walsh used the Adjutant General's post for "private gain" by pressuring subordinates into joining the National Guard Association of the United States in an effort to bolster Montana's membership numbers and enhance Walsh's candidacy for Vice President of NGAUS. Walsh disputed the IG's report, explaining that it stemmed from a disagreement in interpreting the rules which govern when and how Department of Defense employees can take part in activities such as running for a NGAUS leadership position. Walsh further noted that the NGAUS position was uncompensated, requiring him to travel to meetings at his own expense. The report prevented him from receiving federal recognition as a general officer during his tenure as Adjutant General. (Adjutants General are normally federally recognized as major generals in the reserve component of the Army or Air Force, provided they meet all eligibility criteria.) News accounts indicated that Walsh received a formal letter from General Peter W. Chiarelli, then the Vice Chief of Staff of the United States Army, in which Chiarelli reminded Walsh of his obligation to remain impartial in his dealings with non-federal entities, such as NGAUS.

Former Governor Brian Schweitzer said that when he received the report in 2010, he considered it "much ado about nothing." Contemporary news accounts indicated that Schweitzer wrote to Chiarelli to state his confidence in Walsh's integrity and abilities, and to urge his promotion to the federally recognized general officer ranks.

== Lieutenant Governor of Montana ==
In March 2012, Attorney General and presumptive Democratic gubernatorial nominee Steve Bullock selected Walsh to be his running mate. The pair won the Democratic primary with 87% of the vote. In the general election, Bullock and Walsh defeated their Republican opponents, former Congressman Rick Hill and his running mate, State Senator Jon Sonju, by 49% to 47%.

They assumed office in January 2013 upon the expiration of the term of Governor Schweitzer and Lieutenant Governor John Bohlinger.

== U.S. Senate ==
=== Appointment ===
In December 2013, President Barack Obama nominated retiring United States Senator Max Baucus to be the next United States Ambassador to China.

On February 6, 2014, Baucus was confirmed and resigned his Senate seat. On February 9, Governor Bullock appointed Walsh to serve the remainder of Baucus's Senate term, and Walsh resigned as Lieutenant Governor. He was sworn in on February 11, taking the oath from Vice President Joe Biden.

=== Committee assignments ===
- Committee on Agriculture, Nutrition and Forestry
  - Subcommittee on Commodities, Markets, Trade and Risk Management
  - Subcommittee on Conservation, Forestry and Natural Resources
  - Subcommittee on Livestock, Dairy, Poultry, Marketing and Agriculture Security
- Committee on Commerce, Science, and Transportation
- Committee on Rules and Administration
- Special Committee on Aging

=== Legislative work ===
Walsh supported passage of the Native Language Immersion Student Achievement Act and reauthorization of the Native American Languages Act of 1990. "Preserving Native languages is essential to improving education for tribal nations", he said. Along with six other Democratic senators, Walsh co-sponsored the Small Business Tax Credits Accessibility Act, which was introduced in the House on February 28.

He and Republican congressman Steve Daines supported the North Fork Watershed Protection Act of 2013, which proposed to "protect both sides of the Flathead River drainage from energy and mineral development". The bill passed in the House, but Senate Republicans prevented it from being voted on, killing it in the Senate. He asked Congress to support the Keystone Pipeline and proposed to leave infrastructure decisions to the State Department, instead of the President. He supported extending the tax credit for wind energy, and passing the Medicare Protection Act. Along with many Democrats and one Independent, he supported the Paycheck Fairness Act.

On June 18, 2014, in a speech before the Senate, he urged the U.S. should react with "extreme caution" to events in Iraq. He spoke briefly about his experiences as an infantry officer there, and urged other Congressmen to consider the ongoing impacts of war in their decision. On July 8, 2014, Walsh introduced the Bring Jobs Home Act (S. 2569; 113th Congress), a bill that would amend the Internal Revenue Code to grant business taxpayers a tax credit for up to 20% of insourcing expenses incurred for eliminating a business located outside the United States and relocating it within the United States, and deny a tax deduction for outsourcing expenses incurred in relocating a U.S. business outside the United States.

Harry Reid praised him for his military service and efforts to prevent suicide among veterans.

== 2014 election ==
On October 3, 2013, Walsh announced his intention to run for the seat of retiring Senator Max Baucus. On February 9, 2014, Walsh was appointed to replace Baucus in the Senate after Baucus stepped down early to become U.S. Ambassador to China, making Walsh the incumbent in the race. Rancher Dirk Adams and former Montana Lieutenant Governor John Bohlinger also ran for the Democratic nomination.

Walsh was endorsed by Governor Bullock, Senator Jon Tester, and former Senator Baucus, an arrangement which was criticized by his opponent as being "politically motivated", designed to give Walsh an advantage in the election by making him an incumbent, which would aid fundraising efforts. Walsh defeated Adams and Bohlinger in the June 3, 2014 primary election. Republican Congressman Steve Daines defeated two other candidates in the Republican primary and would have been Walsh's opponent in the general election. Walsh was endorsed by the Planned Parenthood Action Fund.

When The New York Times reported in July 2014 that Walsh had plagiarized a 2007 paper he submitted at the United States Army War College, the Democratic Senatorial Campaign Committee continued to back Walsh. The Missoulian, the Billings Gazette, and the Bozeman-area Montana Pioneer published editorials calling for Walsh to end his candidacy. Walsh's campaign was criticized for its response, after which the campaign acknowledged it had made an "unintentional mistake" by stating Walsh had "survived hundreds of IED explosions". They clarified that this figure applied to his unit, while Walsh personally survived one attack.

Walsh dropped out of the race on August 7, 2014, resulting in the Montana state Democratic Central Committee selecting State Representative Amanda Curtis as Walsh's replacement. In October 2014, the National Republican Senatorial Committee revealed that a researcher on its staff had found the plagiarism and leaked it to The New York Times.

In the November 2014 general election Republican Steve Daines defeated Curtis 57.9% to 40.0%.

== Post-Senate career ==
In February 2016 a spokesperson for the United States Department of Agriculture announced that Walsh had been appointed state director of Montana's USDA Rural Development office. In 2017, Walsh was succeeded by Charles Robison, who had been chief of staff for Congressman Greg Gianforte. Walsh then joined a Helena-based company to pursue a fulltime career in real estate sales.

Party political offices
Preceded by John Bohlinger	Democratic nominee for Lieutenant Governor of Montana; 2012	Succeeded by Mike Cooney
Preceded by Max Baucus	Democratic nominee for U.S. Senator from Montana (Class 2); Withdrew; 2014	Succeeded by Amanda Curtis
Political offices
Preceded by John Bohlinger	Lieutenant Governor of Montana; 2013–2014	Succeeded by Angela McLean
U.S. Senate
Preceded by Max Baucus	U.S. Senator (Class 2) from Montana; 2014–2015; Served alongside: Jon Tester	Succeeded by Steve Daines
U.S. order of precedence (ceremonial)
Preceded by Carte Goodwin as Former U.S. Senator	Order of precedence of the United States	Succeeded by Martha McSally as Former U.S. Senator
