= John Bohlinger =

33rd Lieutenant Governor of Montana

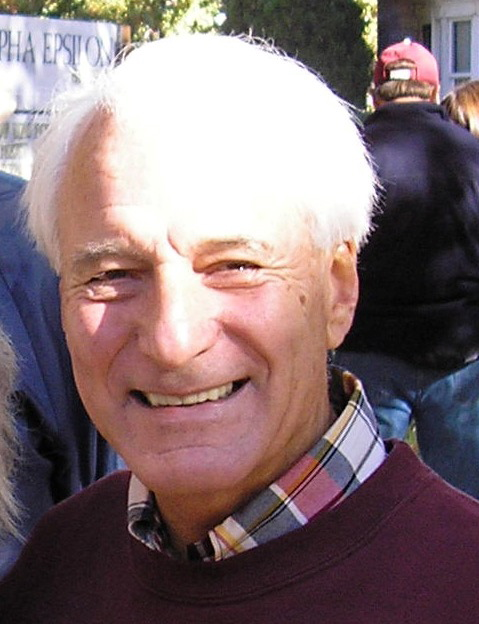

33rd Lieutenant Governor of Montana
- In office January 3, 2005 – January 7, 2013
- Governor: Brian Schweitzer
- Preceded by: Karl Ohs
- Succeeded by: John Walsh

Member of the Montana Senate from the 7th district
- In office January 4, 1999 – December 16, 2004
- Preceded by: Sharon Estrada
- Succeeded by: Jim Elliott

Member of the Montana House of Representatives from the 14th district
- In office January 2, 1995 – January 4, 1999
- Preceded by: Bob Bachini
- Succeeded by: Roy Brown

Member of the Montana House of Representatives from the 94th district
- In office January 4, 1993 – January 2, 1995
- Succeeded by: Larry Grinde

Personal details
- Born: John C. Bohlinger Jr. April 21, 1936 (age 90) Bozeman, Montana, U.S.
- Party: Democratic (2013–present)
- Other political affiliations: Republican (before 2013); Independent (2013)
- Spouse(s): Bette Cobetto (deceased); Karen Seiler
- Children: John Bohlinger
- Education: University of Montana, Missoula

Military service
- Branch/service: United States Marine Corps

John C. Bohlinger Jr. (born April 21, 1936) is an American politician and businessman who served as the 33rd Lieutenant Governor of Montana from 2005 to 2013. He ran for the office as a Republican on a bipartisan ticket headed by Democratic gubernatorial candidate Brian Schweitzer. Schweitzer and Bohlinger were elected to the governorship and lieutenant governorship in 2004; both were reelected in 2008. Due to term limits, they were unable to run in the 2012 election. Bohlinger switched to the Democratic Party in 2013.

== Early life, education and private career ==
Bohlinger was born in Bozeman, Montana, in 1936 to John and Aileen Bohlinger. In 1941, the family moved to Billings, Montana where his parents operated a women's apparel store, Aileen's.

While enrolled at Billings Senior High School, Bohlinger enlisted in the United States Marine Corps Reserve. He went on to the University of Montana where he became a member of the Sigma Chi fraternity, and earned a Bachelor of Arts in business. The Marine Corps called him to service after his sophomore year and he completed his university career after completing his service with the Marine Corps. Bohlinger spent the next 33 years as a small businessman working in the family clothing business.

== Early political career ==
Bohlinger served three terms in the Montana House of Representatives and was then twice elected to the Montana Senate. He resigned his Montana Senate seat as he assumed the office of lieutenant governor.

== Lieutenant Governor of Montana ==
On the 2004 Democratic gubernatorial ticket, Bohlinger, a Republican, joined with Democratic candidate Brian Schweitzer. There was no precedent in Montana for a gubernatorial ticket where the candidates belonged to different parties. The ticket prevailed, and Bohlinger was inaugurated as lieutenant governor of Montana, on January 3, 2005. The Schweitzer-Bohlinger team was reelected to a second term, on November 4, 2008.

== 2014 U.S. Senate election ==
On November 5, 2013, Bohlinger announced his candidacy for the Democratic nomination in 2014 for Montana's Class II U.S. Senate seat, to succeed the retiring Max Baucus. The Democratic nomination was won by U.S. Senator John Walsh who had been appointed to fill the seat when Baucus resigned. Walsh dropped out of the race on August 7, following allegations of plagiarism. He was replaced by Amanda Curtis.

== Personal ==
He was the husband of Bette Cobetto, who died of cancer on January 9, 2006. Bohlinger married Karen Seiler in Helena on January 12, 2008. They have since divorced.

Political offices
Preceded by Karl Ohs	Lieutenant Governor of Montana; 2005–2013	Succeeded by John Walsh
