= North Fork Watershed Protection Act of 2013 =

- Long title: To withdraw certain Federal land and interests in that land from location, entry, and patent under the mining laws and disposition under the mineral and geothermal leasing laws and to preserve existing uses.
- Announced in: the 113th United States Congress
- Sponsored by: Rep. Steve Daines (R, MT-0)
- Number of co-sponsors: 0

Codification
- Agencies affected: Bureau of Land Management

Legislative history
- Introduced in the House as H.R. 2259 by Rep. Steve Daines (R, MT-AL) on June 5, 2013; Committee consideration by United States House Committee on Natural Resources

The North Fork Watershed Protection Act of 2013 (H.R. 2259) is a bill that would withdraw 430,000 acres of federal lands in Montana from programs to develop geothermal and mineral resources. The law would forbid mountaintop removal mining and other natural resource development. The affected lands lie adjacent to Glacier National Park and already have some protections. The bill follows up on an agreement between Canada and the United States on how to protect the trans-border area from the effects of mining. In the 2010 agreement, Canada agreed not to do any additional mining on the British Columbian Flathead with the expectation that Montana would do the same thing to its land.

The North Fork Watershed Protection Act of 2013 was introduced in the United States House of Representatives during the 113th United States Congress. Its companion measure by the same name, (S. 255 in the 113th Congress), had previously been introduced in both the 111th United States Congress and the 112th United States Congress without becoming law.

== Provisions of the bill ==
This summary is based largely on the summary provided by the Congressional Research Service, a public domain source.

The North Fork Watershed Protection Act of 2013 would withdraw federally owned land or interest in land within the North Fork Lands Withdrawal Area in Montana from: (1) all forms of location, entry, and patent under the mining laws; and (2) disposition under all laws relating to mineral and geothermal leasing.

The bill would provide that nothing in this Act restricts recreational uses, livestock management activities, or forest management activities allowed on such land.

== Congressional Budget Office report ==
This summary is based largely on the summary provided by the Congressional Budget Office, as ordered reported by the House Committee on Natural Resources on January 28, 2014. This is a public domain source.

H.R. 2259 would withdraw 430,000 acres of federal lands in Montana from programs to develop geothermal and mineral resources. The affected lands, which lie adjacent to Glacier National Park, are already protected for wilderness values, and the proposed designation would not significantly affect the way they are managed. Based on information provided by the Bureau of Land Management (BLM), the Congressional Budget Office (CBO) estimates that implementing the legislation would have no significant impact on the federal budget. Enacting H.R. 2259 would not affect direct spending or revenues; therefore, pay-as-you-go procedures do not apply.

The bill would not affect valid, existing rights on the affected lands, including the rights of private entities to 39 oil and gas leases that have been suspended since 1985 because of litigation. BLM has not offered any new oil and gas leases on the affected lands since that litigation, and CBO does not expect any such leases to be offered in the next 10 years. In addition, based on information provided by BLM, CBO expects that no income would be derived from other activities on the affected lands over that period; therefore, we estimate that enacting H.R. 2259 would not affect direct spending.

H.R. 2259 contains no intergovernmental or private-sector mandates as defined in the Unfunded Mandates Reform Act and would impose no costs on state, local, or tribal governments.

On June 26, 2013, CBO transmitted a cost estimate for S. 255, the North Fork Watershed Protection Act of 2013, as ordered reported by the United States Senate Committee on Energy and Natural Resources on June 18, 2013. The two bills are similar, and the CBO cost estimates are the same.

== Procedural history ==
The North Fork Watershed Protection Act of 2013 was introduced on June 5, 2013 by Rep. Steve Daines (R, MT-0). It was referred to the United States House Committee on Natural Resources. It was reported (amended) by the committee on February 28, 2014 alongside House Report 113-370. On February 29, 2014, House Majority Leader Eric Cantor announced that H.R. 2259 would be considered under a suspension of the rules on March 3, 2014. Consideration was delayed until March 4, 2014 due to a snowstorm in Washington D.C.

== Debate and discussion ==
Rep. Daines emphasized his desire "to rise above partisan politics, preserve the prestine landscape, and 'protect this critical watershed'," when he announced that he would be introducing the bill. According to Daines, both conservationists and energy companies support the bill.

The mayor of Whitefish, Montana, John Muhlfeld, argued that the bill would protect the town's water supply indefinitely and said the city fully supported the bill. Supporters also argued that the bill would be good for tourism.

The bill has the support of the National Parks Conservation Association supported the bill, saying the bill "protects both our outdoor heritage and our economic future for generations to come."

== See also ==
- List of bills in the 113th United States Congress
