= Krayton Kerns =

American politician

Member of the Montana House of Representatives from the 58 district
- In office 2007–2014
- Preceded by: Emelie K Eaton (D)
- Succeeded by: Seth Berglee (R)

Personal details
- Born: April 26, 1957 (age 69) Sheridan, Wyoming
- Party: Republican
- Education: University of Wyoming; Colorado State University
- Committees: Agriculture; Judiciary

Krayton D. Kerns (born April 26, 1957 in Sheridan, Wyoming) is a Republican former member of the Montana Legislature. In 2007 he was elected to House District 58 which represents a part of the Yellowstone County area.

In 2009 he successfully sponsored House Bill 228, a controversial castle doctrine bill supported by the National Rifle Association of America, which, among others, allows a person at home to use deadly force in the face of any perceived threat.
