= Restoring Healthy Forests for Healthy Communities Act =

- Long title: To restore employment and educational opportunities in, and improve the economic stability of, counties containing National Forest System land, while also reducing Forest Service management costs, by ensuring that such counties have a dependable source of revenue from National Forest System land, to provide a temporary extension of the Secure Rural Schools and Community Self-Determination Act of 2000, and for other purposes.
- Announced in: the 113th United States Congress
- Sponsored by: Rep. Doc Hastings (R, WA-4)
- Number of co-sponsors: 15

Codification
- Acts affected: Healthy Forests Restoration Act of 2003, National Environmental Policy Act of 1969, National Forest Management Act of 1976, Forest and Rangeland Renewable Resources Planning Act of 1974, Endangered Species Act of 1973
- U.S.C. sections affected: 16 U.S.C. § 7111 et seq., 16 U.S.C. § 472a(e)(1), 16 U.S.C. § 1609(a), 7 U.S.C. §§ 1010–1012, 16 U.S.C. § 500, 42 U.S.C. § 4331 et seq., 42 U.S.C. § 4332(2), 16 U.S.C. § 1604(g)(3)(E), 16 U.S.C. § 472(a)(g), 16 U.S.C. § 1533, 16 U.S.C. § 576b, 16 U.S.C. § 472a(h), 16 U.S.C. § 7101 et seq.
- Agencies affected: United States Department of Agriculture, United States Department of Commerce, United States Department of the Interior

Legislative history
- Introduced in the House as H.R. 1526 by Rep. Doc Hastings (R, WA-4) on April 12, 2013; Committee consideration by United States House Committee on Agriculture, United States House Committee on Natural Resources, United States House Agriculture Subcommittee on Conservation, Energy, and Forestry, United States House Natural Resources Subcommittee on Public Lands and Environmental Regulation

The Restoring Healthy Forests for Healthy Communities Act (H.R. 1526) is a bill that was introduced in the United States House of Representatives during the 113th United States Congress. The Restoring Healthy Forests for Healthy Communities Act would direct the United States Department of Agriculture to establish at least one Forest Reserve Revenue Area within each unit of the National Forest System designated for sustainable forest management for the production of national forest materials (the sale of trees, portions of trees, or forest products from System lands) and forest reserve revenues (to be derived from the sale of such materials in such an Area). The bill then states that the purpose of an Area is to provide a dependable source of 25% payments and economic activity for each beneficiary county containing System land that was eligible to receive payments through its state under the Secure Rural Schools and Community Self-Determination Act of 2000.

== Provisions of the bill ==
This summary is based largely on the summary provided by the Congressional Research Service, a public domain source.

The Restoring Healthy Forests for Healthy Communities Act would direct the Secretary of Agriculture (USDA) to establish at least one Forest Reserve Revenue Area within each unit of the National Forest System designated for sustainable forest management for the production of national forest materials (the sale of trees, portions of trees, or forest products from System lands) and forest reserve revenues (to be derived from the sale of such materials in such an Area). The bill then states that the purpose of an Area is to provide a dependable source of 25% payments and economic activity for each beneficiary county containing System land that was eligible to receive payments through its state under the Secure Rural Schools and Community Self-Determination Act of 2000.

The bill would instruct the Secretary of Agriculture to: (1) manage Areas in the manner necessary to achieve their annual volume requirement, and (2) conduct covered forest reserve projects within those Areas in accordance with this Act. It also would define "annual volume requirement" and "covered forest reserve project."

The Restoring Healthy Forests for Healthy Communities Act would require a covered project to be implemented consistent with the land and resource management plan for the System unit in which the project will be carried out. Finally, the bill would require forest reserve revenues to be used to make: (1) deposits into the Knutson-Vandenburg Fund and the salvage sale fund in contributions equal to the monies collected under such Acts for projects conducted on System land, and (2) 25% payments to states for the benefit of public schools and public roads of beneficiary counties.

== Procedural history ==
=== House ===
The Restoring Healthy Forests for Healthy Communities Act was introduced into the House on April 12, 2013, by Rep. Doc Hastings (R, WA-4). It was referred to the United States House Committee on Agriculture, the United States House Committee on Natural Resources, the United States House Agriculture Subcommittee on Conservation, Energy, and Forestry, and the United States House Natural Resources Subcommittee on Public Lands and Environmental Regulation. The House Majority Leader Eric Cantor placed the bill on the House Schedule on September 13, 2013, for consideration under a suspension of the rules on September 17.

== Debate and discussion ==
Supporters of the bill argued that the "failure to harvest enough timber is leaving fuel in forests that is leading to larger wildfires."

== See also ==
- List of bills in the 113th United States Congress
- United States Forest Service
