= Champ Edmunds =

American politician

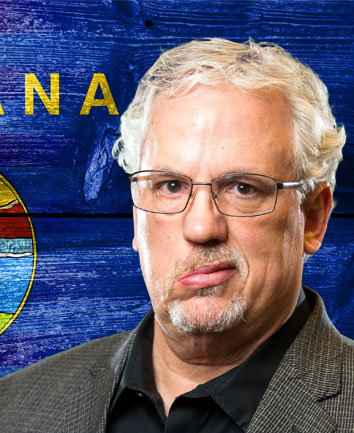
- Edmunds in 2013

Member of the Montana House of Representatives from the 100th district
- In office January 3, 2011 – January 5, 2015
- Preceded by: Bill Nooney
- Succeeded by: Andrea Olsen

Personal details
- Born: Richard Champion Edmunds, Jr. September 9, 1963 (age 63) Sumter, South Carolina, U.S.
- Party: Republican
- Spouse: Carla Siqueland (div)
- Children: 2
- Education: University of Montana
- Website: Business website Facebook

Richard Champion "Champ" Edmunds, Jr. is an American politician and a former Republican member of the Montana House of Representatives from 2011 to 2015.

== Personal and professional life ==
Richard Champion "Champ" Edmunds Jr. was born September 9, 1963, in Sumter, South Carolina. An injury during birth resulted in the severing of nerves on the right side of his face, causing facial paralysis.

Champ grew up working on his family's dairy farm. After high school he joined the United States Navy, navigating submarines for more than ten years. After leaving the navy, he moved to Missoula, Montana. He attended the University of Montana and earned a degree in Business Administration with a focus on Accounting and Finance. Edmunds has worked as a public accountant and in banking as a mortgage banker.

== Political career ==
=== 2010 election ===
Edmunds was elected to the Montana Legislature to represent House District 100, which represents a portion of the Missoula area, on November 2, 2010. He was officially sworn into office on January 3, 2011. He had no primary opponent and beat the Democratic challenger in the general election.

=== 2012 election ===
Edmunds was re-elected to the Montana Legislature in 2012. He was unopposed in the primary and beat the Democratic challenger, earning 56% of the vote.

=== 2014 U.S. Senate election ===
Edmunds unsuccessfully sought the Republican nomination for the U.S. Senate seat then held by John Walsh.

Edmunds officially announced his run for U.S. Senate at a press conference at Bitterroot Motors in Missoula on February 28, 2013. He spoke to about 50 supporters, party leaders and residents from Missoula and the Bitterroot.

Edmunds said that if elected, he was ready to start fixing Washington. “First with a balanced budget amendment, and then with a prohibition of legislative riders, changing those two things alone in Washington would solve most of the problems they have there... I am ready to reduce the size of the Federal Government and stand for Montana as your civil servant.”

Edmunds characterized himself as a "fighter", telling how he had worked throughout life to counter the facial palsy that afflicted him at birth. He said he wants to see a new face in Washington D.C.

=== 2016 Montana State Auditor election ===
On April 2, 2015, Edmunds announced he would be running for Montana State Auditor in 2016. He exited the race on February 8, 2016, and endorsed fellow Republican Matt Rosendale.
