= Ken Miller (Montana politician) =

American politician (born 1957)

Ken Miller (born February 1, 1957) is a Montana business owner and former Republican member of the Montana State Senate. He served as Chairman of the Montana Republican Party from 2001 to 2003 and was a candidate for the Republican nomination for Governor of Montana in the 2012 election.

== Personal life ==
Miller was born in Fort Collins, Colorado, and was raised on a dairy farm in Colorado until 1974, when his family moved to Joliet, Montana. In 1979 he started a construction and roofing business which he ran with his wife until 2001. Currently he and his family operate a furniture store in Laurel, Montana. In 1980 he married his wife, Peggy. The couple has two children, Max and Kyndall.

== Political career ==
In 1994 Miller was elected to the Montana State Senate in a traditionally democratic district which was previously represented by Chet Blaylock, a respected Montana political veteran and the Democratic nominee for governor in 1996. Miller served in the Senate for 8 years, where he counts among his legislative accomplishments working to privatize state liquor stores and helping reduce the coal severance tax. Miller also served as chairman of the Montana Republican Party from 2001 to 2003 and saw significant majorities in both houses of the State Legislature. In 2004, Miller sought the Republican nomination for governor when Judy Martz announced that she would not seek a second term. In a crowded primary he garnered 22% of the vote in an election ultimately won by Secretary of State Bob Brown.

== Political positions ==
Miller has gained a reputation as a conservative Republican; he is pro-life and an advocate for Second Amendment Rights and lower taxes. He has also taken conservative positions on immigration, entitlements, education, and the federal government's involvement in managing the wolf population in Montana. In a 2010 op-ed in the Billings Gazette, Miller called for Montanans to support a ballot initiative that would call for a Montana Constitutional Convention, calling the current document "conflicting and ambiguous."
