= Angela McLean =

35th Lieutenant Governor of Montana

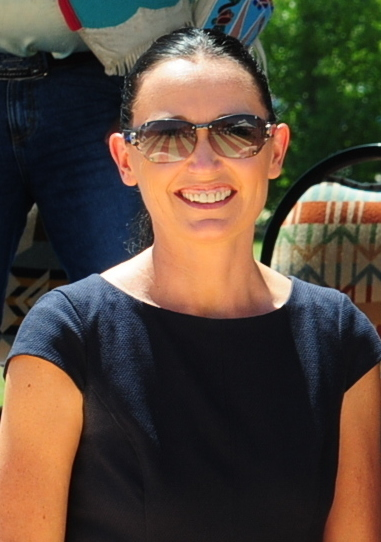
- McLean in 2015

35th Lieutenant Governor of Montana
- In office February 17, 2014 – January 3, 2016
- Governor: Steve Bullock
- Preceded by: John Walsh
- Succeeded by: Mike Cooney

Chair of the Montana Board of Regents of Higher Education
- In office January 19, 2012 – February 17, 2014
- Governor: Brian Schweitzer; Steve Bullock
- Preceded by: Clayton Christian
- Succeeded by: Paul Tuss (Acting)

Personal details
- Born: August 19, 1970 (age 56) Twin Bridges, Montana, U.S.
- Party: Democratic
- Spouse: Mike McLean
- Children: 2
- Education: University of Montana, Western; University of Montana, Missoula

Angela McLean (born August 19, 1970) is an American politician and educator who served as the 35th Lieutenant Governor of Montana from February 10, 2014, to January 3, 2016. Governor Steve Bullock, a Democrat, selected McLean in 2014 to replace newly appointed U.S. Senator John Walsh after appointing Walsh to the vacancy created by Senator Max Baucus's resignation.

She was sworn in as Montana's new Lieutenant Governor by District Judge Ray Dayton on February 17, 2014. She was the first teacher and the second woman (after Judy Martz) to serve as the state's Lieutenant Governor.

== Career ==
McLean was chairwoman of the Montana Board of Regents from January 2012 to February 2014. She has also served on the Montana Board of Public Education. She taught American history and government at Anaconda High School. She was originally from Twin Bridges, Montana. She also has taught as an adjunct professor at Montana Tech of the University of Montana.

On February 10, 2014, Bullock named Angela McLean to serve as the 31st Lieutenant Governor of Montana. At the time of her appointment, McLean was a teacher at Anaconda High School and the Chairwoman of the Montana Board of Regents. After McLean became Lieutenant Governor, fellow Regent Paul Tuss was named the acting chair.

McLean focused on education, including science, technology, engineering, and mathematics (STEM) education and Montana's SMART Schools initiative, during her tenure as Lieutenant Governor of Montana.

In November 2015 McLean announced her resignation as Lieutenant Governor of Montana, effective upon the appointment of her successor, in order to accept the position of director of American Indian and minority achievement in the office of the state commissioner of higher education. Emails and correspondence indicate that Bullock and McLean had a fraught relationship during the final months of her tenure and the conditions surrounding McLean's departure may not have been positive. In a statement to Lee Newspapers on December 11, McLean said, "I loved every part of my job as lieutenant governor. I worked hard every day and in every part of the state to advocate for my fellow Montanans and earn the salary they paid me."

== Personal life ==
McLean graduated from Twin Bridges High School and became the first person in her family to graduate from college. She earned a bachelor's degree from the University of Montana Western and a master's degree in curriculum and instruction at the University of Montana. She is married to Mike McLean, an attorney. The couple has two children, Colin and Ellen.

== See also ==
- List of female lieutenant governors in the United States

Political offices
Preceded by John Walsh	Lieutenant Governor of Montana; 2014–2016	Succeeded by Mike Cooney
