= Larry Grinde =

American politician (born 1948)

Majority Leader of the Montana House of Representatives
- In office 1993–2000
- Preceded by: Jerry Driscoll
- Succeeded by: Paul Sliter

Minority Whip of the Montana House of Representatives
- In office 1991–1992

Member of the Montana House of Representatives
- In office 1986–2000

Personal details
- Born: Larry Hal Grinde; June 25, 1948 (age 78) Lewistown, Montana, U.S.
- Party: Republican
- Children: 2
- Education: University of Wyoming; Montana State University
- Profession: Politician, rancher

Larry Hal Grinde (born June 25, 1948) is an American politician and rancher who served in the Montana House of Representatives from 1986 to 2000 as a Republican. Grinde served as House Minority Whip from 1991 to 1992 and House Majority Leader from 1993 to 2000.

== Early life and education ==
Grinde was born in Lewistown, Montana, on June 25, 1948. He attended the University of Wyoming and Montana State University.

== Career ==
Grinde served in the Montana House of Representatives from 1986 to 2000 as a Republican. He served as House Minority Whip from 1991 to 1992 and House Majority Leader from 1993 to 2000.

Grinde was an unsuccessful candidate to represent the 47th legislative district of Montana in the Montana Senate in 2000.

Outside the Montana Legislature, Grinde served as a chair of the Fergus County Republican Central Committee.

Outside politics, Grinde worked as a rancher.

== Political positions ==
In 1998, Grinde received a 100% rating from Gun Owners of America and a B rating from the NRA Political Victory Fund. In 1999, he received a 100% rating from the National Federation of Independent Business.

== Personal life ==
Grinde currently resides in Lewistown. He is divorced and has two children.

Grinde is Lutheran.

Montana House of Representatives
Preceded by —	Member of the Montana House of Representatives; 1986–2000	Succeeded by —
Montana House of Representatives
Preceded by —	Minority Whip of the Montana House of Representatives; 1991–1992	Succeeded by —
Montana House of Representatives
Preceded by Jerry Driscoll	Majority Leader of the Montana House of Representatives; 1993–2000	Succeeded by Paul Sliter
