= Montana Federation of Public Employees =

American labor union

- Founded: 2000
- Location: Helena, Montana
- Members: 18,000
- Key people: Melissa Romano, president
- Affiliations: AFL-CIO, American Federation of Teachers, National Education Association
- Website: www.mfpe.org

The Montana Federation of Public Employees (MFPE) is a labor union in the state of Montana. Its 18,000 members make it the largest union in the state.

The MFPE is a professionally diverse union, with its members being teachers, paraprofessionals and other school-related personnel. As well as law enforcement-including the Department of Corrections, Highway Patrol, Department of Transportation, MCS, healthcare workers and other state and county entities.

== History ==
MFPE was formed in 2018 by the merger of Montana's two largest labor unions: MEA-MFT and the Montana Public Employees Association (MPEA). MFPE is Montana's largest labor union, predominately a union of public employees working in almost every Montana community in public elementary and secondary schools, public higher education, state, county, and city governments. MFPE is one of five merged state affiliates of the National Education Association (NEA) and American Federation of Teachers (AFT).

Before merger with MPEA, MEA-MFT was the result of the merger of the Montana Education Association (MEA) and the Montana Federation of Teachers (MFT) in 2000.

In 1882, seven years before statehood, Montana frontier parents and teachers formed what ultimately became MEA. From the beginning MEA was a union of professional public school educators, especially teachers, and until the middle 1970s and the adoption of the Montana collective bargaining act, public school administrators.

MFT first emerged in 1917 when a small group of professors at Montana State College (now the University of Montana) petitioned the newly created AFT for affiliate status and became AFT Local 111. That unit disappeared, but reemerged in 1972 at the University of Montana.

MEA and MFT had long been rivals, with MEA organizing teachers in most of the state's large cities and MFT organizing teachers and other education workers in small towns and rural counties as well as state workers and higher education.

The two unions began a closer, cooperative working relationship in 1990 when MEA president Eric Feaver and MFT president Jim McGarvey jointly accused the Montana Lottery of failing to deliver on promises to improve teacher retirement benefits in the state. From 1991 to 1993, the unions expanded their cooperative efforts into the legislative field, jointly endorsing candidates and winning passage of a number of important pieces of legislation.

In 1993, the unions held their first joint professional development conference. A year later, the unions merged their locals in Missoula as an experiment and trial run for a possible statewide merger. With the backing of AFT president Albert Shanker and NEA president Keith Geiger, the MFT approved a resolution expressing its intent to merge in 1996. MEA followed suit a year later, and a joint merger committee was established to write a constitution develop transition procedures.

In 1998, national merger between the AFT and NEA seemed imminent. While the AFT executive council approved the merger, delegates to the NEA Representative Assembly failed to approve merger by the necessary two-thirds majority. This appeared to imperil the MEA-MFT merger, but Feaver and McGarvey declared their intention to merge regardless of what the parent bodies' said. The NEA and AFT quickly established national guidelines for state and local level mergers, with the MEA-MFT merger providing the first test case.

In 1999, the unions merged their political action committees and staff.

From March 31 to April 1, 2000, 400 MEA and MFT delegates met in Helena to approve the merger, establish a dues structure, and finalize a budget for the new merged organization. Officers were elected in May.

In 2005, MEA-MFT organized the faculty at Montana Technological University, the last major institution of higher education in the state without a union.

== Leadership ==
Eric Feaver became president of the MEA in 1984, the MFPE's predecessor organization, and was again elected president when it merged with the MFT in 2000. Feaver retired from the MFPE in June 2020, with Amanda Curtis, an educator and former representative in the Montana House, being elected to succeed him. In April 2026, state representative Melissa Romano was elected to succeed Curtis.
