= 2012 Montana gubernatorial election =

- November 6, 2012
- Turnout: 72.18%▼2.32
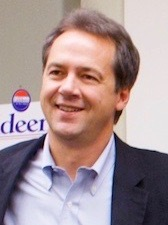

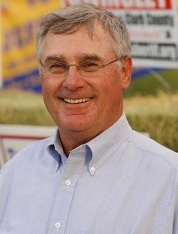
Nominee	Steve Bullock	Rick Hill
Party	Democratic	Republican
Running mate	John Walsh	Jon Sonju
Popular vote	236,450	228,879
Percentage	48.90%	47.34%
- County results Bullock: 40–50% 50–60% 60–70% 70–80% Hill: 40–50% 50–60% 60–70% 70–80% 80–90%
Governor before election
Brian Schweitzer
Democratic
Elected Governor
Steve Bullock
Democratic

The 2012 Montana gubernatorial election took place on November 6, 2012, to elect the governor of Montana. Incumbent Democratic Governor Brian Schweitzer was term-limited and could not run for re-election to a third term.

Montana Attorney General Steve Bullock won the Democratic primary with 87% of the vote, and former U.S. Representative Rick Hill won the Republican primary with 34% of the vote. In the general election, Bullock won by 7,571 votes, taking 48.9% of the vote to Hill's 47.3%. With a margin of 1.6%, this election was the second-closest race of the 2012 gubernatorial election cycle, behind only the election in Puerto Rico. Due to the close margin, media outlets did not call the race for Bullock until the next day. This was the last time anyone other than Greg Gianforte was the Republican nominee.

== Democratic primary ==
=== Candidates ===
==== Declared ====
- Steve Bullock, Montana attorney general

- Running mate: John Walsh, brigadier general and former adjutant general in the Montana National Guard

- Heather Margolis, Montana representative for community service organization ServeNext

- Running mate: Steve Nelsen, founder of the Montana Conservation Corps

==== Withdrew ====
- Larry Jent, state senator

==== Declined ====
- John Bohlinger, lieutenant governor of Montana
- Carl Borgquist, president of Grasslands Renewable Energy of Bozeman
- Dave Wanzenried, state senator
- Pat Williams, former U.S. representative

=== Polling ===
Poll source	Date(s) administered	Sample size	Margin of error	Steve Bullock	Larry Jent	Other	Undecided
Public Policy Polling	November 28–30, 2011	573	± 4.1%	70%	6%	—	24%

=== Results ===
Democratic primary results
Party	Candidate	Votes	%
Democratic	Steve Bullock	76,738	86.6
Democratic	Heather Margolis	11,823	13.4
Total votes		88,561	100.0

== Republican primary ==
=== Candidates ===
==== Declared ====
- Bob Fanning, retired businessman

- Running mate: Joel Boniek, former state representative
- Former running mate: Chuck Baldwin, pastor and Constitution Party nominee for president in 2008 (dropped out February 2012)

- Rick Hill, former U.S. representative

- Running mate: Jon Sonju, state senator

- Neil Livingstone, terrorism and national security analyst

- Running mate: Ryan Zinke, state senator

- Jim Lynch, former Montana Department of Transportation director

- Running mate: Al Olszewski, orthopedic surgeon and Carroll College trustee

- Ken Miller, former state senator and former chairman of the Montana Republican Party

- Running mate: Bill Gallagher, public service commissioner

- Jim O'Hara, Chouteau County Commissioner

- Running mate: Scott Swingley, private investigator and former trooper in the Montana Highway Patrol

- Corey Stapleton, former state senator

- Running mate: Bob Keenan, former president of the Montana Senate

==== Withdrew ====
- Jeff Essmann, majority leader of the Montana Senate
- Drew Turiano, real estate investor

==== Declined ====
- Denny Rehberg, U.S. representative (ran for the U.S. Senate)

=== Polling ===
Poll source	Date(s) administered	Sample size	Margin of error	Jeff Essmann	Bob Fanning	Rick Hill	Neil Livingstone	Jim Lynch	Ken Miller	Jim O'Hara	Corey Stapleton	Other/ Undecided
Public Policy Polling	April 26–29, 2012	403	± 4.88%	—	1%	33%	5%	4%	12%	4%	7%	35%
Public Policy Polling	November 28–30, 2011	700	± 3.7%	5%	1%	37%	3%	4%	10%	3%	2%	35%

=== Results ===
Primary results by county: Hill: Hill—51-60%; Hill—41-50%; Hill—31-40%; Hill—21-30%; Stapleton: Stapleton—31-40%; Stapleton—21-30%; Miller: Miller—51-60%; Miller—41-50%; Miller—31-40%; Miller—21-30%; O'Hara: O'Hara—51-60%; O'Hara—31-40%

Republican primary results
Party	Candidate	Votes	%
Republican	Rick Hill	46,802	34.4
Republican	Corey Stapleton	24,661	18.1
Republican	Ken Miller	24,496	18.0
Republican	Jim O'Hara	16,653	12.2
Republican	Neil Livingstone	12,038	8.8
Republican	Jim Lynch	8,323	6.1
Republican	Bob Fanning	3,087	2.3
Total votes		136,060	100.0

== General election ==
=== Candidates ===
- Steve Bullock (D), Montana attorney general

- Running mate: John Walsh, brigadier general and former adjutant general in the Montana National Guard

- Rick Hill (R), former U.S. representative

- Running mate: Jon Sonju, state senator

- Ron Vandevender (Libertarian), businessman

- Running mate: Marc Mulcahy

=== Debate ===
- Complete video of debate, C-SPAN, October 10, 2012

=== Predictions ===
Source	Ranking	As of
The Cook Political Report	Tossup	November 1, 2012
Sabato's Crystal Ball	Lean R (flip)	November 5, 2012
Rothenberg Political Report	Tossup	November 2, 2012
Real Clear Politics	Tossup	November 5, 2012

=== Polling ===
Aggregate polls

Source of poll aggregation	Dates administered	Dates updated	Steve Bullock (D)	Rick Hill (R)	Other/Undecided (Note: Calculated by taking the difference of 100% and all other candidates combined.)	Margin
Real Clear Politics	September 27 – November 3, 2012	November 3, 2012	44.0%	45.7%	10.3%	Hill +1.7%

View source data.

Poll source	Date(s) administered	Sample size	Margin of error	Steve Bullock (D)	Rick Hill (R)	Other	Undecided
Public Policy Polling	November 2–3, 2012	836	± 3.4%	48%	48%	2%	2%
Mason-Dixon	October 29–31, 2012	625	± 4.0%	46%	49%	2%	3%
Public Policy Polling	October 8–10, 2012	737	± 3.6%	42%	43%	8%	7%
Montana State University	September 27–30, 2012	477	± 4.6%	38%	40%	2%	20%
Mason-Dixon	September 17–19, 2012	625	± 4.0%	44%	43%	2%	11%
Public Policy Polling	September 10–11, 2012	656	± 3.2%	44%	39%	8%	9%
Public Policy Polling	April 26–29, 2012	934	± 3.2%	39%	39%	—	21%
Public Policy Polling	November 28–30, 2011	1,625	± 2.4%	38%	39%	—	23%
Public Policy Polling	June 16–19, 2011	819	± 3.4%	37%	39%	—	23%
Public Policy Polling	November 10–13, 2010	1,176	± 2.9%	31%	41%	—	28%

Hypothetical polling

With Bohlinger

Poll source	Date(s) administered	Sample size	Margin of error	John Bohlinger (D)	Jeff Essmann (R)	Other	Undecided
Public Policy Polling	June 16–19, 2011	819	± 3.4%	40%	33%	—	28%

Poll source	Date(s) administered	Sample size	Margin of error	John Bohlinger (D)	Rick Hill (R)	Other	Undecided
Public Policy Polling	June 16–19, 2011	819	± 3.4%	39%	40%	—	21%

Poll source	Date(s) administered	Sample size	Margin of error	John Bohlinger (D)	Ken Miller (R)	Other	Undecided
Public Policy Polling	June 16–19, 2011	819	± 3.4%	39%	33%	—	28%

With Bullock

Poll source	Date(s) administered	Sample size	Margin of error	Steve Bullock (D)	Jeff Essmann (R)	Other	Undecided
Public Policy Polling	November 28–30, 2011	1,625	± 2.4%	42%	30%	—	28%
Public Policy Polling	June 16–19, 2011	819	± 3.4%	38%	33%	—	28%

Poll source	Date(s) administered	Sample size	Margin of error	Steve Bullock (D)	Neil Livingstone (R)	Other	Undecided
Public Policy Polling	November 28–30, 2011	1,625	± 2.4%	41%	29%	—	30%

Poll source	Date(s) administered	Sample size	Margin of error	Steve Bullock (D)	Ken Miller (R)	Other	Undecided
Public Policy Polling	April 26–29, 2012	934	± 3.2%	41%	35%	—	24%
Public Policy Polling	November 28–30, 2011	1,625	± 2.4%	40%	31%	—	29%
Public Policy Polling	June 16–19, 2011	819	± 3.4%	38%	34%	—	28%

With Jent

Poll source	Date(s) administered	Sample size	Margin of error	Larry Jent (D)	Rick Hill (R)	Other	Undecided
Public Policy Polling	November 28–30, 2011	1,625	± 2.4%	26%	39%	—	35%

Poll source	Date(s) administered	Sample size	Margin of error	Larry Jent (D)	Neil Livingstone (R)	Other	Undecided
Public Policy Polling	November 28–30, 2011	1,625	± 2.4%	26%	30%	—	44%

Poll source	Date(s) administered	Sample size	Margin of error	Larry Jent (D)	Ken Miller (R)	Other	Undecided
Public Policy Polling	November 28–30, 2011	1,625	± 2.4%	25%	33%	—	42%

With Wanzenried

Poll source	Date(s) administered	Sample size	Margin of error	Dave Wanzenried (D)	Jeff Essmann (R)	Other	Undecided
Public Policy Polling	June 16–19, 2011	819	± 3.4%	31%	33%	—	36%

Poll source	Date(s) administered	Sample size	Margin of error	Dave Wanzenried (D)	Rick Hill (R)	Other	Undecided
Public Policy Polling	June 16–19, 2011	819	± 3.4%	30%	40%	—	30%

Poll source	Date(s) administered	Sample size	Margin of error	Dave Wanzenried (D)	Ken Miller (R)	Other	Undecided
Public Policy Polling	June 16–19, 2011	819	± 3.4%	30%	35%	—	35%

=== Results ===
2012 Montana gubernatorial election
Party	Candidate	Votes	%	±%
Democratic	Steve Bullock	236,450	48.90%	−16.57%
Republican	Rick Hill	228,879	47.34%	+14.82%
Libertarian	Ron Vandevender	18,160	3.76%	+1.75%
Total votes		483,489	100.00%	N/A
Democratic hold				

==== Counties that flipped from Democratic to Republican ====
- Beaverhead (largest city: Dillon)
- Broadwater (largest city: Townsend)
- Carbon (largest city: Red Lodge)
- Chouteau (largest municipality: Fort Benton)
- Custer (largest city: Miles City)
- Daniels (largest city: Scobey)
- Dawson (largest city: Glendive)
- Fallon (largest city: Baker)
- Fergus (largest city: Lewistown)
- Flathead (largest city: Kalispell)
- Golden Valley (largest city: Ryegate)
- Granite (largest city: Philipsburg)
- Jefferson (largest city: Clancy)
- Judith Basin (largest city: Stanford)
- Liberty (largest city: Chester)
- Lincoln (largest city: Libby)
- Madison (largest city: Ennis)
- McCone (largest city: Circle)
- Mineral (largest city: Superior)
- Park (largest city: Livingston)
- Phillips (largest city: Malta)
- Pondera (largest city: Conrad)
- Powell (largest city: Deer Lodge)
- Prairie (largest city: Terry)
- Ravalli (largest city: Hamilton)
- Richland (largest city: Sidney)
- Rosebud (largest city: Colstrip)
- Sanders (largest city: Thompson Falls)
- Sheridan (largest city: Plentywood)
- Stillwater (largest city: Columbus)
- Teton (largest city: Choteau)
- Toole (largest city: Shelby)
- Treasure (largest city: Hysham)
- Valley (largest city: Glasgow)
- Wheatland (largest city: Harlowton)
- Wibaux (largest city: Wibaux)
- Yellowstone (largest city: Billings)
