= Amanda Curtis =

American politician (born 1979)

Member of the Montana House of Representatives from the 74th district
- In office January 2, 2017 – January 7, 2019
- Preceded by: Pat Noonan

Member of the Montana House of Representatives from the 76th district
- In office January 7, 2013 – January 7, 2015
- Preceded by: Jon Sesso
- Succeeded by: Ryan Lynch

Personal details
- Born: Amanda Gayle Morse; September 10, 1979 (age 47) Billings, Montana, U.S.
- Party: Democratic
- Spouse: Kevin Curtis (m. 2001)
- Education: University of Montana, Tech (BS); University of Montana, Western; University of Montana, Missoula (MEd)

Amanda Gayle Curtis (née Morse, born September 10, 1979) is an American politician who served as the president of the Montana Federation of Public Employees (MFPE), Montana's largest labor union.

Curtis describes herself as a socialist. She served as a Democrat in the Montana House of Representatives from 2013 to 2015 and again from 2017 to 2019. She was the Democratic nominee in Montana's 2014 U.S. Senate election.

== Early life, education, and career ==
Curtis's parents divorced when she was four years old. She credits her father's union benefits and health insurance for allowing her to obtain health care as a child, including basic vision and dental services. Her family was poor, and her mother struggled with mental illness; the family sometimes relied upon food stamps and endured periods of having their utilities disconnected. Curtis graduated from Billings Skyview High School. Her support of gun measures such as expanded background checks stems directly from the death of her brother, who killed himself playing Russian roulette when he was 16.

Curtis valued education as the way out of poverty. After graduating from Montana Tech of the University of Montana in 2002 with a Bachelor of Science in biology, she went on to the University of Montana Western, where she received her secondary teaching certificate in biology and mathematics in 2004. From 2004 to 2006, she worked at Butte Central Catholic High School, teaching math and physics. Between 2006 and 2009, she taught math at Helena Middle School, and since 2009 she has taught math at Butte High School.

Curtis is working toward a Master of Education in educational leadership at the University of Montana, Missoula. She resides in Butte with her husband, Kevin.

== Political career ==
=== Montana House of Representatives ===
Curtis was elected unopposed to the Montana House of Representatives on November 6, 2012, to succeed fellow Democrat Jon Sesso, who was elected to the Montana Senate. In the 2013 legislative session, she was one of the 39 Democrats in the House.

Curtis was sworn in on January 7, 2013. Curtis served on the Business and Labor, Human Services, and Local Government committees.

For the first 87 days of the session, Curtis uploaded a daily vlog to the video-sharing website YouTube, discussing what had gone on that day in the Montana Legislature. In April 2013, Curtis gained media attention after calling out Republican members for opposing the repeal of Montana's anti-sodomy law.

During a rally sponsored by Mayors Against Illegal Guns outside of the Montana State Capitol in August 2013, Curtis urged Montana's senior U.S. Senator Max Baucus to rethink his opposition to expanded background checks. She spoke about how gun violence has affected her own family and called for more action to be taken.

During the 2013 session, Curtis was the primary sponsor for six bills that were not enacted. She was the primary sponsor of two bills that were passed and signed into law, HB 92 to remove public defender from certain court definitions, and HB 164, to revise when county commissioner district boundaries can be modified.

She did not run for reelection in 2014, instead running for the United States Senate, but she was reelected to the Montana House in 2016.

=== 2014 U.S. Senate election ===
Incumbent Senator John Walsh won the Democratic primary in June 2014. In July, The New York Times ran an article claiming that Walsh had plagiarized a term paper that was a requirement for his Master's thesis at the Army War College. On August 7, 2014, Walsh announced that he was leaving the 2014 race. The Montana state Democratic Central Committee had until August 20 to select a replacement candidate to appear on the November ballot. The Montana Democratic Party set a nominating convention for August 16.

The day prior to the nomination convention, Curtis was considered the front-runner to replace Walsh. She had gained several key endorsements, including the MEA-MFT. The week leading up to the nominating convention, several people who had expressed interest in the nomination dropped out, leaving Curtis and Dirk Adams as the remaining candidates. During the convention, Curtis received 82 votes to Adams's 46 (with one delegate abstaining), winning the nomination with 64% of the vote. Curtis was able to accept only the maximum legally allowable contribution of $2,000 from funds that Walsh had left over in his campaign account; Walsh also distributed funds to other candidates and to party organizations. On August 21, Curtis announced that she had raised $110,000 in four days and had named Clayton Elliott, director of the League of Rural Voters and lead lobbyist/community organizer of the Northern Plains Resource Council, as her campaign manager. By mid-October, Curtis had raised $723,000 and had begun airing television ads.

=== Return to the Montana House of Representatives ===
After the 2014 Senate election, Curtis served the rest of her term in the Montana House of Representatives and left office in 2015. She returned to teaching math and physics at Butte High School. She remained active in MEA-MFT, serving as the NEA Director as of 2015. Curtis endorsed Bernie Sanders for 2016 United States presidential election and helped organize a rally for Sanders in Missoula in June 2015.

In October 2015, Curtis announced that she would be running for Montana House of Representatives District 74. Curtis was reelected and returned to the Montana House of Representatives in January 2017. Her term ended in 2019.

=== 2017 U.S. House election ===
Following her reelection to the state house, Curtis expressed interest in running for departing U.S. Representative Ryan Zinke's seat in Montana's at-large congressional district special election in 2017. She was not selected as the Democratic nominee, losing to Rob Quist.

Montana House of Representatives
Preceded by Jon Sesso	Member of the Montana House of Representatives from the 76th district 2013–2015	Succeeded by Ryan Lynch
Preceded by Pat Noonan	Member of the Montana House of Representatives from the 74th district 2017–present	Incumbent
Party political offices
Preceded by John Walsh; Withdrew	Democratic nominee for U.S. Senator from Montana (Class 2); 2014	Succeeded by Steve Bullock
