= List of entertainers from Montana =

Location of Montana

Montana /mɒnˈtænə/ is a state in the Western United States. The western third of Montana contains numerous mountain ranges. Smaller, "island ranges" are found in the central third of the state, for a total of 77 named ranges of the Rocky Mountains. This geographical fact is reflected in the state's name, derived from the Spanish word montaña (mountain). Montana has several nicknames, none official, including: "The Treasure State" and "Big Sky Country", and slogans that include "Land of the Shining Mountains" and more recently, "The Last Best Place". The state ranks fourth in area, but 44th in population, and accordingly has the third-lowest population density in the United States. The economy is primarily based on services, with ranching, wheat farming, oil and coal mining in the east, and lumber, tourism, and hard rock mining in the west. Millions of tourists annually visit Glacier National Park, the Little Bighorn Battlefield National Monument, and three of the five entrances to Yellowstone National Park.

A number of Montanans have become notable for their involvement in acting, animation, directing, classical music, rock music, and opera. Actors include Gary Cooper, who won Academy Awards for Sergeant York (1942) and High Noon (1952), and Myrna Loy, who won a lifetime achievement Academy Award in 1991. Martha Raye was an entertainer who was a strong supporter of, and much beloved by, members of the United States military. Animator Brad Bird won Academy Awards for The Incredibles (2004) and Ratatouille (2007). Director David Lynch has been nominated for four Academy Awards. Jeff Ament is the bassist for Pearl Jam. Soprano Judith Blegen is a member of New York's Metropolitan Opera.

== Entertainment and performing arts ==
=== Film and TV ===
==== Actors ====
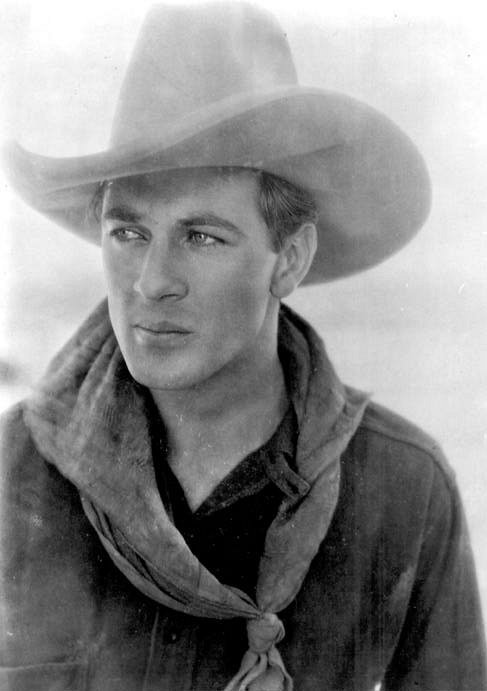
Actor Gary Cooper in publicity photo for The Winning of Barbara Worth (1926)

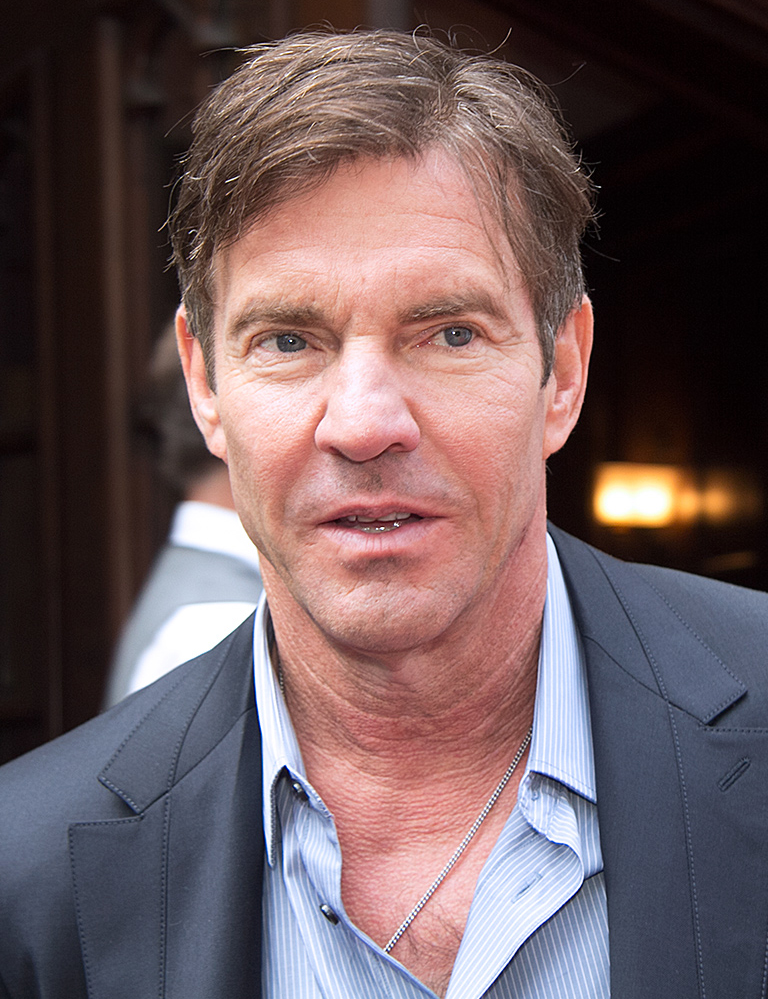
Actor Dennis Quaid at the 2012 Toronto International Film Festival

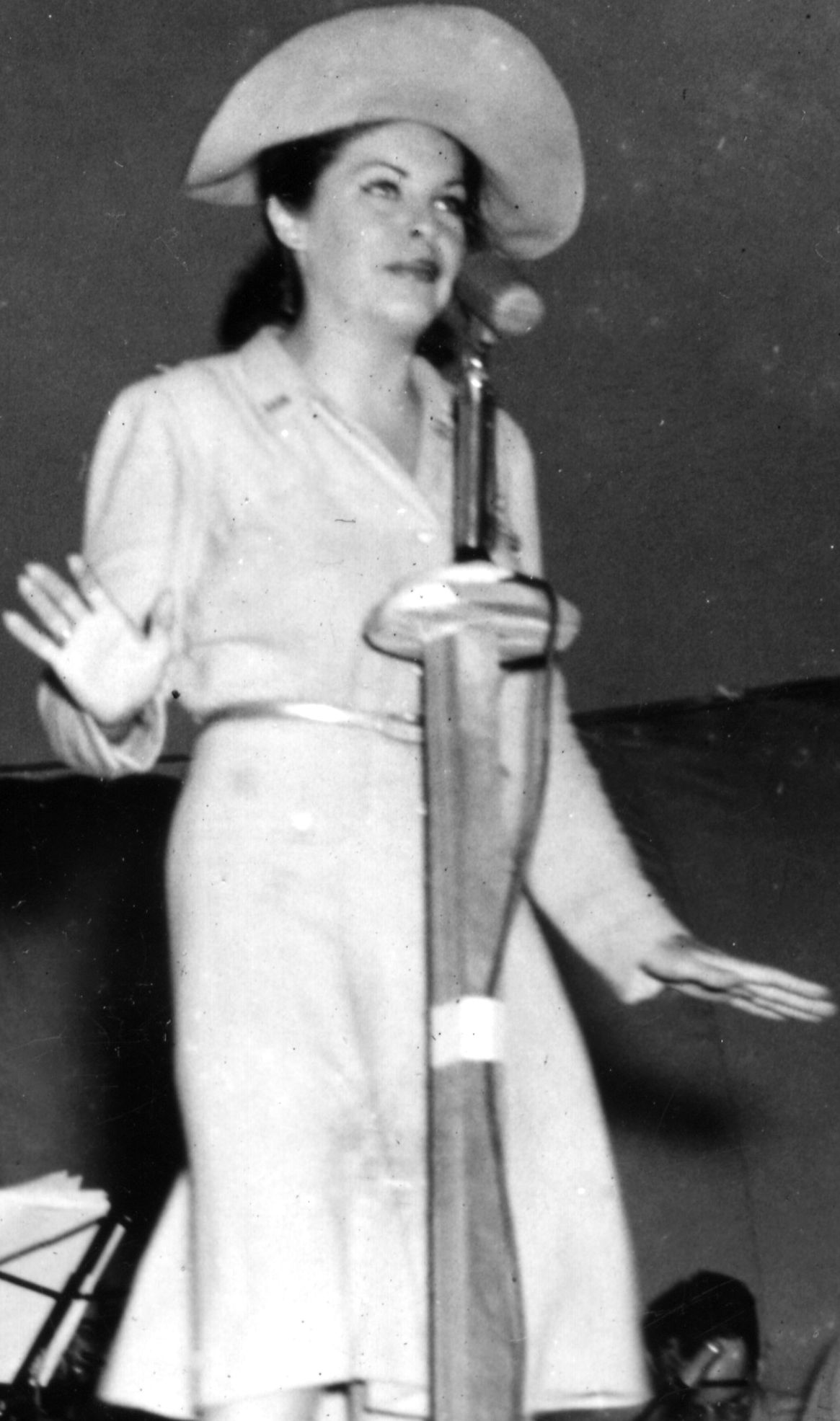
Actress Martha Raye entertaining U.S. troops during World War II at Accra, Ghana in March 1943

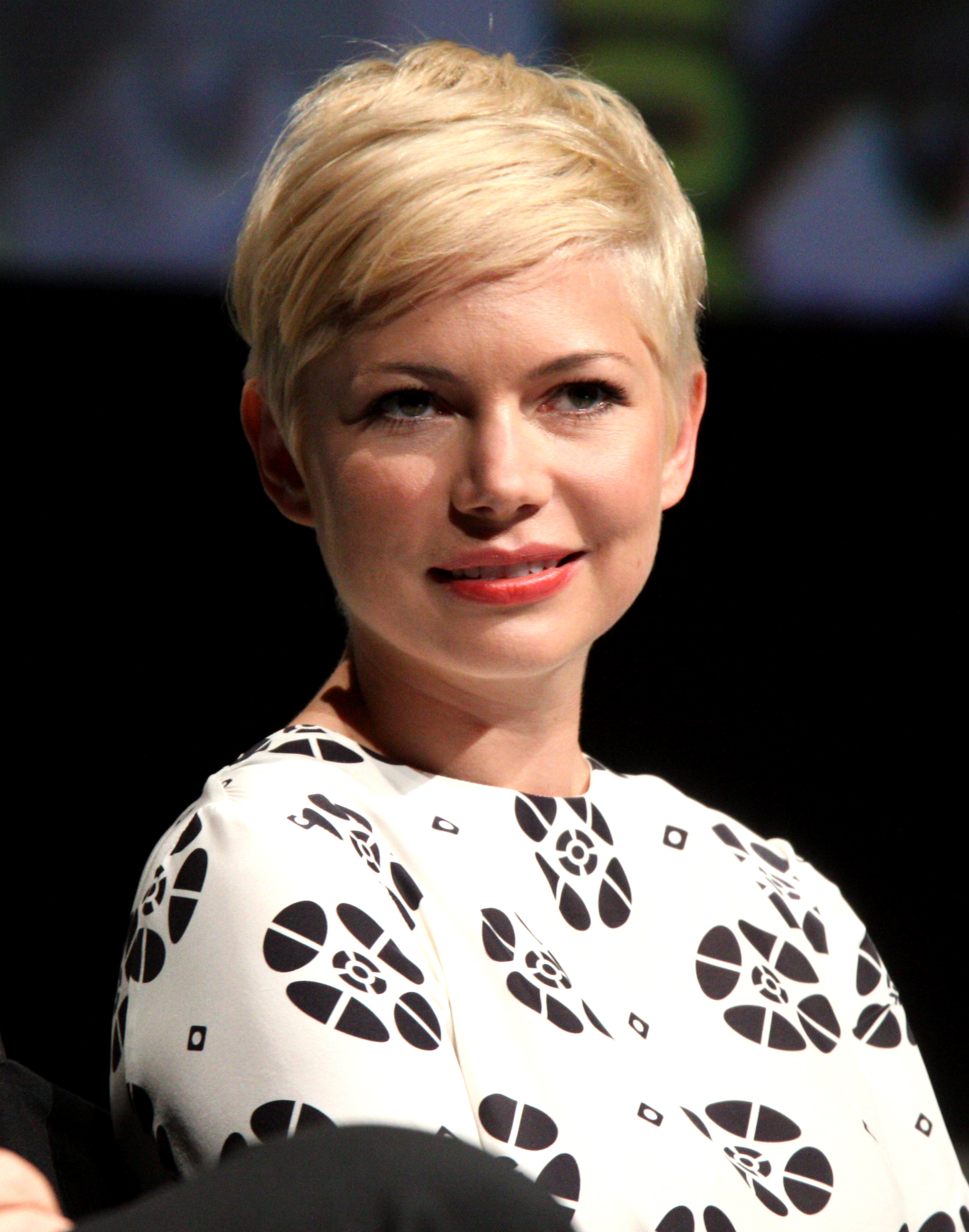
Actress Michelle Williams at San Diego Comic-Con in 2012

Actors from Montana
| Name | Lifetime | Montana connection | Comments | Ref(s) |
|---|---|---|---|---|
| Stanley Anderson | 1939–2018 | Born in Billings | Actor; played "George Carey" on The Drew Carey Show | |
| Dirk Benedict | 1945–present | Born in Helena; raised in White Sulphur Springs | Actor; played "Faceman" on The A-Team television series | |
| Robert Bray | 1917–1983 | Born and raised in Kalispell | Actor; played forest ranger Corey Stuart on the Lassie television series | |
| Jeff Bridges | 1949–present | Has had a primary home in the Paradise Valley for over 30 years | Actor; nominated for six Academy Awards, won once for his portrayal of Otis "Bad" Blake in the 2009 film Crazy Heart (2009) | |
| Scott Michael Campbell | 1971–present | Born in Missoula | Actor; played "Father Eric" on the television drama Nothing Sacred | |
| Dana Carvey | 1955–present | Born in Missoula | Actor; comedian; cast member on Saturday Night Live; played the role of Garth in the Wayne's World movies | |
| Gary Cooper | 1901–1961 | Born and raised on a ranch near Helena | Actor who specialized in westerns; nominated for five Academy Awards and won twice for Sergeant York (1942) and High Noon (1952) | |
| Walter Coy | 1909–1974 | Born in Great Falls | Actor; narrator for television series Frontier | |
| Patrick Duffy | 1949–present | Born in Townsend | Actor; played Bobby Ewing on the television drama Dallas | |
| Stacy Edwards | 1965–present | Born in Glasgow | Actress; portrayed Hayley Benson on the television drama Santa Barbara | |
| Troy Evans | 1948–present | Born in Missoula; raised in Kalispell | Actor; portrayed Francis "Frank" Martin on the television drama series ER | |
| Jesse Tyler Ferguson | 1975–present | Born in Missoula | Actor; voiced Shangri Llama in the 2016 animated film Ice Age: Collision Course | |
| Peter Fonda | 1940–2019 | Has had a primary home in the Paradise Valley since 1975 | Actor; counterculture of the 1960s; star of Easy Rider; son of Henry Fonda; sister of Jane Fonda | |
| Pert Kelton | 1907–1968 | Born near Great Falls | Actress; vaudeville; television; film; first actress who played Alice Kramden in The Honeymooners with Jackie Gleason | |
| Margot Kidder | 1948–2018 | Longtime Paradise Valley resident | Actress; played Lois Lane in the four Superman movies opposite Christopher Reeve | |
| Wally Kurth | 1958–present | Born and raised in Billings | Actor; soap operas; played the second Ned Ashton on General Hospital; played Justin Kiriakis on Days of Our Lives | |
| Andrea Leeds | 1914–1984 | Born in Butte | Actress; nominated for one Academy Award for Stage Door (1937) | |
| Myrna Loy | 1905–1993 | Born in Helena; raised in Radersburg | Actress; received an Academy Award for lifetime achievement (1991); paired onscreen 14 times with William Powell | |
| George Montgomery | 1916–2000 | Born and raised on a ranch near Brady; attended college in Missoula | Actor; specialized in westerns; painter; sculptor; furniture craftsman; stuntman | |
| Carroll O'Connor | 1924–2001 | Attended college in Missoula and later taught there | Actor; portrayed working man Archie Bunker in the television sitcom All in the Family | |
| Jean Parker | 1915–2005 | Born in Deer Lodge | Actress; film; theatre | |
| Dennis Quaid | 1954–present | Lives in Paradise Valley | Actor; played the lead in Breaking Away, Come See the Paradise, The Rookie, Far from Heaven and The Special Relationship | |
| Martha Raye | 1916–1994 | Born in Butte | Actress; standards singer; nurse; strong supporter of American military; toured with the United Service Organizations (USO) during World War II, Korean War, and Vietnam War; only woman buried in the Special Forces cemetery at Fort Bragg, North Carolina and was buried with full military honors there though never on active duty; known as "Colonel Maggie" to the American military; an honorary Green Beret; awarded Presidential Medal of Freedom in 1993 for her lifetime support to the American military | |
| J. K. Simmons | 1955–present | Resided in Missoula and attended University of Montana | Actor; known for the television roles of Dr. Emil Skoda on the NBC series Law & Order, music instructor Terence Fletcher in 2014's Whiplash | |
| Constance Towers | 1933–present | Born in Whitefish | Actress; film; theatre; television | |
| Kathlyn Williams | 1879–1960 | Born in Butte; attended college in Helena | Actress; film; theatre | |
| Michelle Williams | 1980–present | Born in Kalispell | Actress; nominated for the Academy Award for Best Supporting Actress for Brokeback Mountain (2005) and Manchester by the Sea (2016) | |

==== Adult entertainers ====
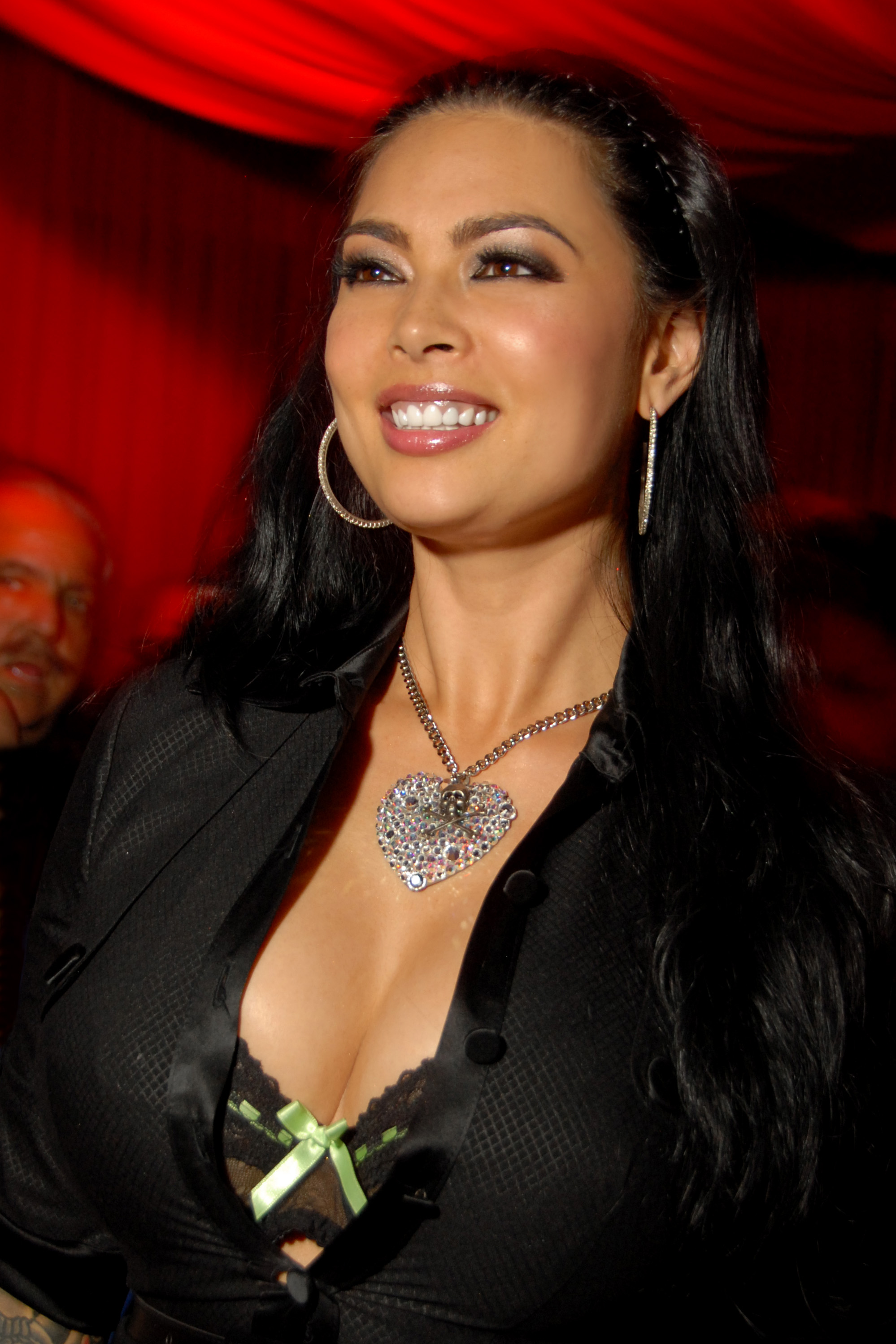
Adult entertainer Tera Patrick in 2009

Adult entertainers from Montana
| Name | Lifetime | Montana connection | Comments | Ref(s) |
|---|---|---|---|---|
| Rebecca Ferratti | 1964–present | Born in Helena | B-movie actress; Playboy Playmate; dancer | |
| Jenna Jameson | 1974–present | Attended high school in Fromberg | Entrepreneur; pornographic actress | |
| Tera Patrick | 1976–present | Born and grew up in Great Falls | Adult film entertainer; appeared in Playboy and Penthouse, where she was the "Pet of the Month" for February 2000 and was selected as "Pet of the Year" runner-up; began hosting the Playboy TV erotic instructional show School of Sex in 2008 | |
| Reagan Wilson | 1947–present | Raised in Missoula; attended college in Bozeman | B-movie actor; Playboy Playmate; a photo of her went to the Moon's surface with Apollo 12 | |

==== Directors ====
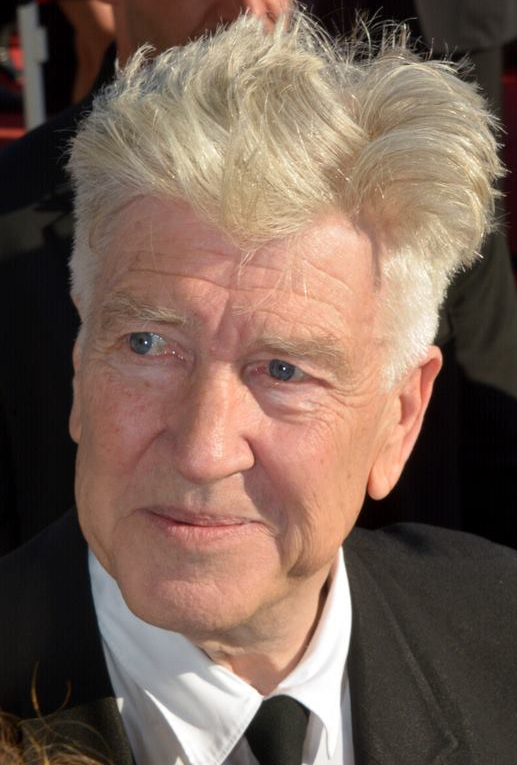
Director David Lynch at the 2017 Cannes Film Festival

Directors from Montana
| Name | Lifetime | Montana connection | Comments | Ref(s) |
|---|---|---|---|---|
| John Dahl | 1956–present | Born and raised in Billings; attended college in Missoula and Bozeman | Film director; screenwriter; specializes in neo-noir films | |
| David Lynch | 1946–2025 | Born in Missoula | Film and television director; nominated for four Academy Awards | |
| Sam Peckinpah | 1925–1984 | Lived at The Murray Hotel in Livingston from 1979 until his death | Film director; screenwriter | |

==== Other film and TV entertainers ====
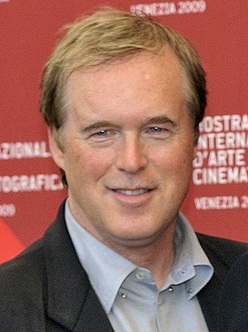
Animator and director Brad Bird in 2009

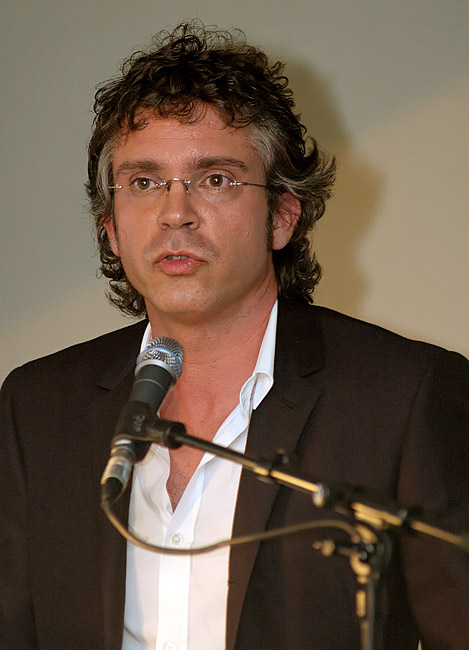
Screenwriter Brannon Braga in 2006

Other film and TV entertainers from Montana
| Name | Lifetime | Montana connection | Comments | Ref(s) |
|---|---|---|---|---|
| Brad Bird | 1957–present | Born in Kalispell | Animator; film director; screenwriter; voice actor; won two Academy Award for Best Animated Feature awards: The Incredibles (2004) and Ratatouille (2007) | |
| Brannon Braga | 1965–present | Born in Bozeman | Screenwriter; television producer; worked on much of the Star Trek franchise | |
| Tom Brokaw | 1940–present | Spends significant time on his ranch on the West Boulder River near Livingston that he bought in 1989 | Television journalist; anchor and managing editor of NBC Nightly News (1982–2004); author of The Greatest Generation | |
| Ted Geoghegan | 1979–present | Raised in Great Falls; attended college in Missoula | Screenwriter; film producer; film director | |
| Chet Huntley | 1911–1974 | Born in Cardwell; attended high school in Whitehall; attended college in Bozeman; died in Big Sky | Television newscaster; co-anchored the evening news program The Huntley-Brinkley Report | |
| Irene Lentz | 1900–1962 | Born in Baker | Costume designer | |
| David Letterman | 1947–present | Spends significant time on his ranch near Choteau, which he bought in 1999 | Television host and comedian; hosted the late night television talk show Late Show with David Letterman; has supported several charities in Montana | |
| Bud Luckey | 1934–2018 | Born and raised in Billings | Animator; worked on Toy Story, Boundin', Toy Story 2, A Bug's Life, Monsters, Inc., Finding Nemo, Cars, The Incredibles, Ratatouille, and Sesame Street | |
| T. J. Lynch | 1964?–present | Born and raised in Billings; attended college in Bozeman | Screenwriter; recipient of the Nicholl Fellowships in Screenwriting from the Academy of Motion Picture Arts and Sciences (1999) | |
| Gerald R. Molen | 1935–present | Born in Great Falls | Film producer; Academy Award winner for and co-producer of Schindler's List (1993) | |
| Traver Rains | 1977–present | Born and raised near Simms | Fashion designer; co-founder of fashion line Heatherette | |
| Rick Rydell | 1963–present | Raised in Billings | Radio talk show host | |

=== Musicians ===
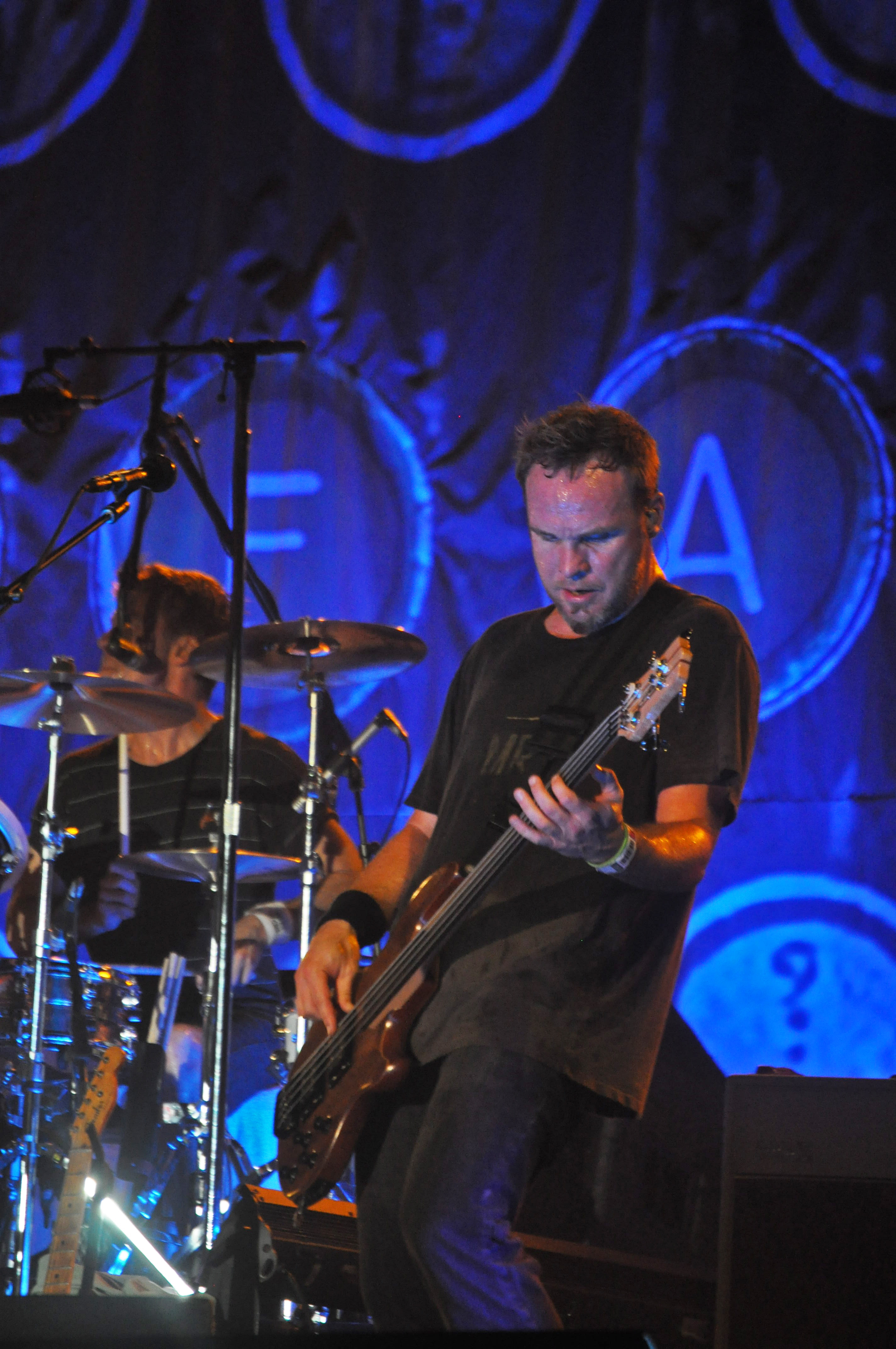
Jeff Ament playing with Pearl Jam in 2009

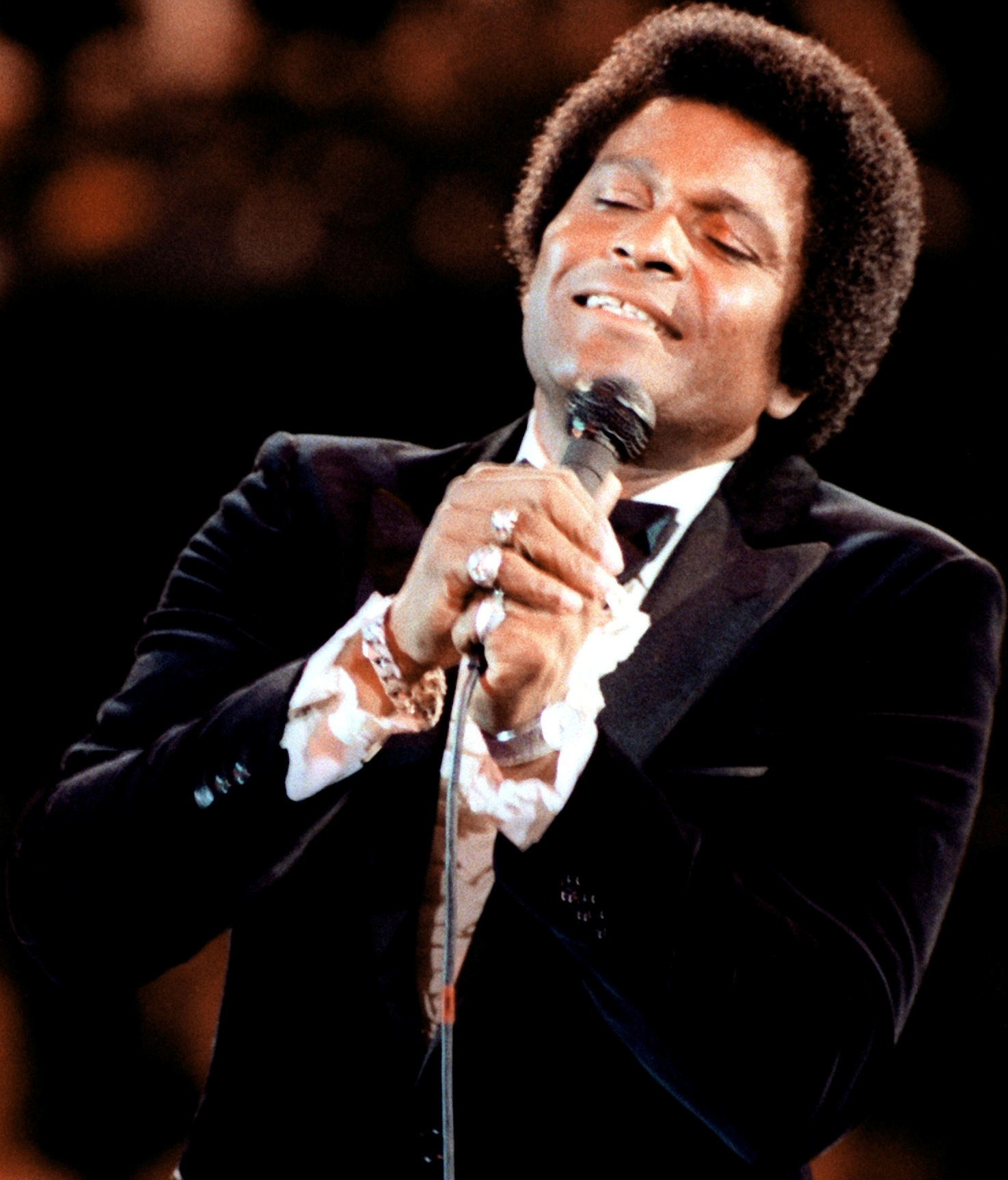
Charley Pride singing at the Presidential Inauguration in January 1981

Musicians from Montana
| Name | Lifetime | Montana connection | Comments | Ref(s) |
|---|---|---|---|---|
| Philip Aaberg | 1949–2026 | Born in Havre; raised in Chester | Pianist | |
| Steve Albini | 1962–2024 | Raised in Missoula | Singer; songwriter; guitarist; audio engineer; music journalist | |
| Aimee Allen | 1982–present | Raised in Missoula | Singer for The Interrupters | |
| Jeff Ament | 1963–present | Born in Havre; raised in Big Sandy; attended college and resides in Missoula | Bassist of Pearl Jam | |
| Eden Atwood | 1969–present | Moved to Montana at age 5; lives in Missoula | Jazz singer; granddaughter of A. B. Guthrie Jr. | |
| Hoyt Axton | 1938–1999 | Lived and died in Victor | Folk singer; songwriter; actor | |
| Judith Blegen | 1943–present | Raised and attended high school in Missoula | Soprano opera singer; member of New York's Metropolitan Opera | |
| Pablo Elvira | 1937–2000 | Lived in Bozeman | Opera baritone | |
| Janet Gardner | 1962–present | Raised in Bozeman | Hard rock singer and rhythm guitarist; previously in glam metal and pop rock genres; solo artist, formerly of Vixen | |
| Emmanuel Taylor Gordon | 1893–1971 | Born, raised, and spent his last years in White Sulphur Springs | Singer; vaudeville performer; wrote a book about growing up African American in small-town Montana | |
| Wylie Gustafson | 1961–present | Born in Conrad | Country western singer and songwriter; co-author of Montana's official lullaby | |
| Nicolette Larson | 1952–1997 | Born in Helena | Singer | |
| Huey Lewis | 1950–present | Lives on a ranch near Stevensville | Singer; songwriter; actor | |
| Colin Meloy | 1974–present | Born and raised in Helena; attended college in Missoula | Singer of The Decemberists; brother of Maile Meloy | |
| Maria Montana | 1893-1971 | Born in Wallace, Idaho; raised in Lewistown | Operatic soprano | |
| Christopher Parkening | 1947–present | Lives near and teaches college at Bozeman during summers since 1974 | Classical guitarist | |
| Charley Pride | 1934–2020 | Lived in Great Falls, Helena, and Missoula during early adulthood while playing Minor league baseball | Country singer; inducted into Country Music Hall of Fame (2000) | |
| Rob Quist | 1948–present | Born in Cut Bank; lives in Kalispell | Singer; guitarist; banjo player; songwriter; former member of the Mission Mountain Wood Band; leader of Great Northern | |
| Allen Vizzutti | 1952–present | Born and raised in Missoula | Trumpet player; composer | |
| Reggie Watts | 1972–present | Raised in Great Falls | Singer, beatboxer, comedian | |
| George Winston | 1949–2023 | Raised in Miles City | New age pianist | |

=== Other entertainers ===
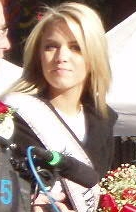
Katie Blair as Miss Teen USA 2006

Other entertainers from Montana
| Name | Lifetime | Montana connection | Comments | Ref(s) |
|---|---|---|---|---|
| Katie Blair | 1988–present | Born and raised in Billings | Fashion model; beauty queen; television personality; Miss Teen USA 2006; first person from Montana to win a major pageant title | |
| Evel Knievel | 1938–2007 | Born and raised in Butte | Motorcycle daredevil; father of Robbie Knievel | |
| Robbie Knievel | 1962–present | Born and raised in Butte | Motorcycle daredevil; son of Evel Knievel | |
| John Nord | 1959–present | Born in Bozeman | Professional wrestler | |
| Michael Smuin | 1938–2007 | Born in Missoula | Ballet; dancer; choreographer; theatre director | |
