= Copperopolis, Montana =

- Ghost Town
- Location within Montana Location within the United States
- Coordinates: 46°36′53″N 110°40′00″W
- Country: United States
- State: Montana
- County: Meagher
- Elevation: 5,652 ft (1,723 m)
- Time zone: UTC-7 (Mountain (MST))
  - Summer (DST): UTC-6 (MDT)
- Area code: 406

Copperopolis was a mining community situated in Meagher County, Montana, United States.

== History ==
Copperopolis served originally as a stage station. It was halfway between White Sulphur Springs and Martinsdale. In 1866 copper veins were discovered in the area north of the Castle Mountains and started attracting attention as a mining center. The deepest shafts ran to 550 feet although much of the ore was recovered close to the grass roots. Hauling costs were extremely expensive until a railroad was built in Martinsdale in 1896.

Copperopolis developed into a family town containing a general store, livery stable, blacksmith shop, barber shop, boarding house, restaurant, and bunkhouses. During the first nine months of operation a quarter of a million dollars was uncovered from the mines. In 1901 copper export prices were cut in half due to the depression in Germany. The mines were forced to close down in 1903 and the families moved away. A story goes that two men remained in town but hated each other. They even visited the town spring at different times to avoid each other.

In 1915 attempts were made to homestead the land.

All of the buildings have been torn down except for one cabin. The lumber was hauled away. What remains is a true ghost town.
