= Springdale Colony, Montana =

- Census-designated place
- Location within Montana Location within the United States
- Coordinates: 46°27′43″N 111°01′09″W
- Country: United States
- State: Montana
- County: Meagher

Area
  - Total: 0.21 sq mi (0.54 km^{2})
  - Land: 0.21 sq mi (0.54 km^{2})
  - Water: 0 sq mi (0.00 km^{2})
- Elevation: 5,263 ft (1,604 m)

Population (2020)
  - Total: 0
  - Density: 0/sq mi (0/km^{2})
- Time zone: UTC-7 (Mountain (MST))
  - Summer (DST): UTC-6 (MDT)
- ZIP Code: 59645 (White Sulphur Springs)
- Area code: 406
- FIPS code: 30-70225
- GNIS feature ID: 2804311

Springdale Colony is a Hutterite community and census-designated place (CDP) in Meagher County, Montana, United States. It is in the southwestern part of the county, at the base of the Big Belt Mountains, which rise to the southwest. White Sulphur Springs, the Meagher county seat, is 11 miles (18 km) to the northeast.

The community was first listed as a CDP prior to the 2020 census. As of the 2020 census, Springdale Colony had a population of 0.

== Demographics ==
Historical population
Census	Pop.	Note	%±
2020	0		—
U.S. Decennial Census
