= Ringling, Montana =

Ringling
- Unincorporated community
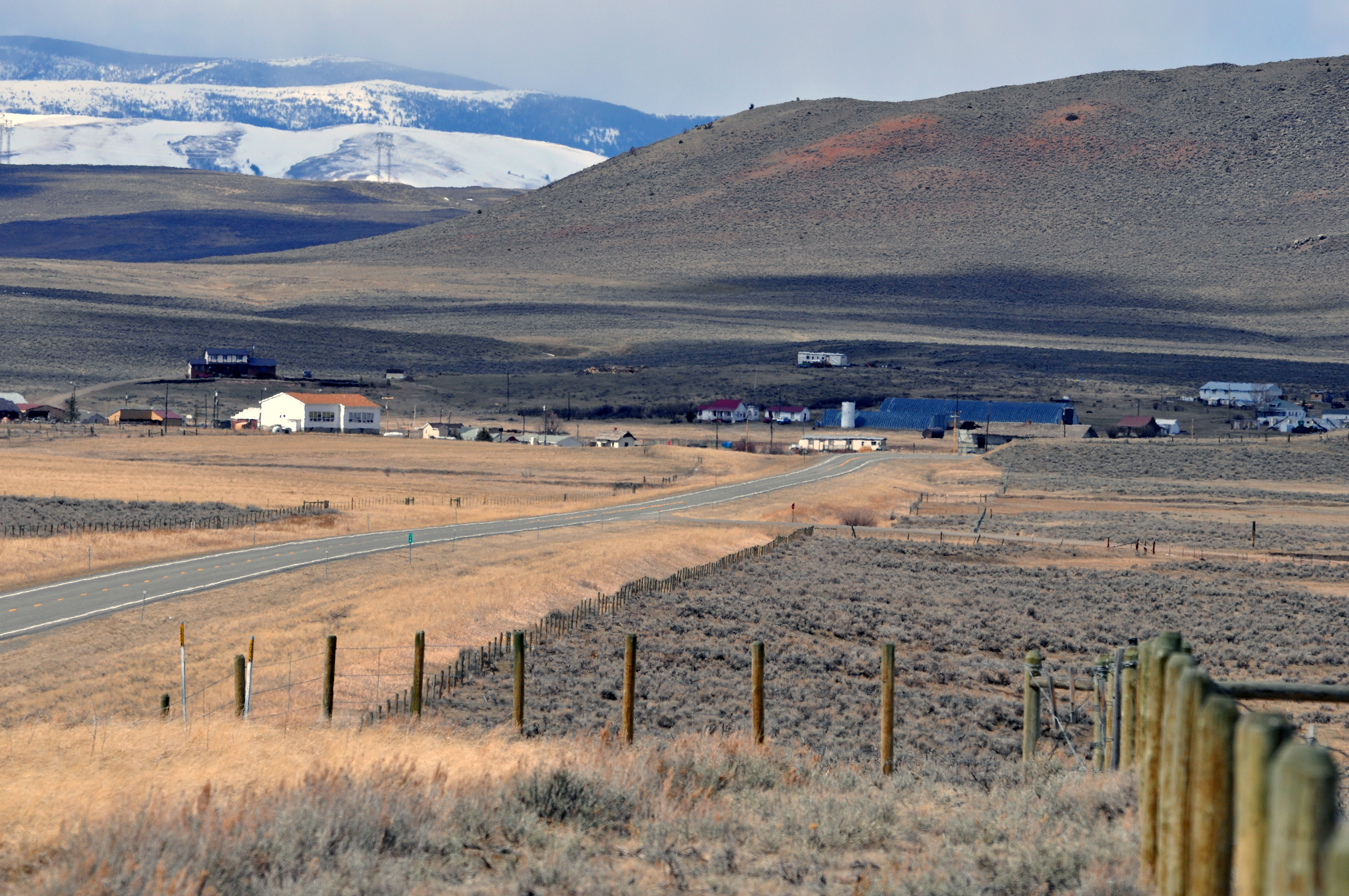
- Ringling from the south

- Location within Montana Location within the United States
- Coordinates: 46°16′18″N 110°48′26″W
- Country: United States
- State: Montana
- County: Meagher
- Elevation: 5,302 ft (1,616 m)
- ZIP code: 59642
- Area code: 406
- GNIS feature ID: 775779

Ringling is an unincorporated community in southern Meagher County, Montana, United States, along the route of U.S. Route 89. The town was a station stop on the transcontinental main line of the Chicago, Milwaukee, St. Paul and Pacific Railroad ("the Milwaukee Road"); it was also the southern terminus of the White Sulphur Springs and Yellowstone Park Railway, which ran from Ringling to White Sulphur Springs. Ringling served as a community center for ranchers and homesteaders in the vicinity, but the town's population declined throughout most of the twentieth century as the region's agricultural activity dwindled. Both railroad lines were abandoned by 1980, and only a handful of people remain in the town today.

Ringling was originally called Leader, but was renamed for John Ringling of the Ringling Brothers Circus family when the White Sulphur Springs and Yellowstone Park Railway was built. John Ringling was a financier of the railroad, as well as its president. He also owned a summer home and spa in White Sulphur Springs, and considerable ranch land in the area.

The lower Shields Valley (which contains Ringling and environs) has one of the warmest average January temperatures in the state of Montana, due to chinook winds. This same consistent warming was responsible for the ice-free corridor which possibly enabled the ancestors of most Native Americans to enter the mainland of North America during the Pleistocene.

Ringling is widely known as the setting for portions of Ivan Doig's 1979 book, This House of Sky. The town was also the subject of the Jimmy Buffett song "Ringling, Ringling" featured on his 1974 album Living & Dying in 3/4 Time.
