= Loco Mountain =

Loco Mountain is the name of the following peaks in the United States:

- Loco Mountain (Fremont County, Colorado), Fremont County, Colorado
- Loco Mountain (Meagher County, Montana)
