= WSYP =

WSYP may refer to:

- White Sulphur Springs and Yellowstone Park Railway
- WSYP-LP, a low-power radio station (95.1 FM) licensed to serve Birmingham, Alabama, United States
