= Sarah Calhoun =

American fashion designer

- Born: March 13, 1979 (age 47)
- Occupations: Business owner, social entrepreneur
- Known for: Founder, Red Ants Pants clothing company

Sarah Calhoun (born March 13, 1979) is a businesswoman and social entrepreneur living in White Sulphur Springs, Montana, United States. She is the founder of the Red Ants Pants clothing brand, which creates rugged clothing designed for women who perform blue-collar and outdoor work. From her business proceeds, she has also created a charitable foundation, and founded an annual outdoor music festival, both of which use the Red Ants Pants trademark.

== Life and career ==
Calhoun grew up on a llama farm in Cornwall, Connecticut and got her degree in Environmental Science from Gettysburg College in Pennsylvania. As a young adult she worked a variety of physical labor jobs on trail crews and as an outdoor educator for Outward Bound and Youth Corps. In 2004 she started developing a design for women's work pants and in 2006 she opened the Red Ants Pants store in rural White Sulphur Springs, MT that sells heavy-duty work wear made to fit diverse female bodies. The brand is named after red ants "because female ants do all the work".

Calhoun is known for her entrepreneurial and values-based approach to running an apparel brand, she is a public spokesperson for women's leadership and rural revitalization and an advocate for American made products. In 2011 she was a U.S. Delegate to the Women and the Economy Summit put on by the Asia-Pacific Economic Cooperation and hosted by Hillary Clinton and invited by President Obama to attend a White House forum on jobs and economic development. That same year she started the Red Ants Pants Music Festival that annually draws thousands of people to a cow pasture just outside White Sulphur Springs. The festival began as part of Calhoun's vision to use the arts for economic and community development. The festival raises money for the Red Ants Pants Foundation which offers financial grants for women and organizations across Montana. In 2015 Calhoun was one of 100 small business leaders invited to a White House summit put on by the Small Business Majority.

== Awards ==
- 2011: US Delegate to the APEC Women in Business Summit
- 2011: Entrepreneur of the Year, State of Montana
- 2012: Women in Business Champion for Montana and the Region, Small Business Administration
- 2012: National Women in Business Champion, Small Business Administration
