= List of mountains in Meagher County, Montana =

There are at least 63 named mountains in Meagher County, Montana.

- Avalanche Butte, 46°45′22″N 111°29′11″W, el. 7,690 feet (2,340 m)
- Bald Hills, 46°58′11″N 111°07′48″W, el. 6,086 feet (1,855 m)
- Battle Mountain, 46°16′36″N 111°03′25″W, el. 6,325 feet (1,928 m)
- Bear Mountain, 46°13′01″N 110°33′46″W, el. 7,798 feet (2,377 m)
- Beartrap Peak, 46°29′43″N 110°45′40″W, el. 8,212 feet (2,503 m)
- Berkins Butte, 46°48′28″N 111°10′50″W, el. 4,669 feet (1,423 m)
- Billie Butte, 46°11′55″N 110°29′39″W, el. 7,798 feet (2,377 m)
- Black Butte, 46°46′41″N 110°56′28″W, el. 6,775 feet (2,065 m)
- Black Butte Mountain, 46°21′20″N 110°53′32″W, el. 6,434 feet (1,961 m)
- Butler Hill, 46°38′50″N 110°51′59″W, el. 5,758 feet (1,755 m)
- Castle Mountain, 46°27′41″N 110°42′42″W, el. 7,969 feet (2,429 m)
- Clay Butte, 46°31′37″N 110°52′00″W, el. 5,331 feet (1,625 m)
- Comb Butte, 46°22′34″N 110°31′14″W, el. 5,932 feet (1,808 m)
- Coxcombe Butte, 46°43′32″N 110°56′08″W, el. 6,745 feet (2,056 m)
- Daisy Peak, 46°40′25″N 110°19′44″W, el. 7,759 feet (2,365 m)
- Davey Butte, 46°12′10″N 110°27′33″W, el. 8,228 feet (2,508 m)
- Desolation Peak, 47°00′09″N 111°08′53″W, el. 7,060 feet (2,150 m)
- Devils Footstool, 46°51′43″N 111°08′15″W, el. 5,315 feet (1,620 m)
- Elk Peak, 46°27′10″N 110°45′12″W, el. 8,553 feet (2,607 m)
- Fort Gay Hill, 46°18′17″N 110°38′26″W, el. 6,247 feet (1,904 m)
- Goat Mountain, 46°11′36″N 110°33′32″W, el. 7,674 feet (2,339 m)
- Gordon Butte, 46°25′06″N 110°21′18″W, el. 5,722 feet (1,744 m)
- Grassy Mountain, 46°18′23″N 111°07′14″W, el. 7,690 feet (2,340 m)
- Green Mountain, 46°45′12″N 110°49′12″W, el. 7,018 feet (2,139 m)
- Green Mountain, 46°59′56″N 110°58′00″W, el. 7,533 feet (2,296 m)
- Hoover Mountain, 46°42′42″N 110°30′43″W, el. 7,484 feet (2,281 m)
- Horse Butte, 46°18′56″N 110°49′04″W, el. 6,106 feet (1,861 m)
- Iron Butte, 46°45′30″N 110°57′06″W, el. 6,411 feet (1,954 m)
- Iron Mountain, 46°58′31″N 110°54′32″W, el. 7,766 feet (2,367 m)
- Kings Hill, 46°50′10″N 110°41′15″W, el. 8,008 feet (2,441 m)
- Lebo Peak, 46°11′24″N 110°17′49″W, el. 8,999 feet (2,743 m)
- Loco Mountain, 46°13′29″N 110°20′09″W, el. 9,242 feet (2,817 m)
- Mizpah Peak, 46°49′12″N 110°43′47″W, el. 7,746 feet (2,361 m)
- Monument Peak, 46°59′51″N 111°05′51″W, el. 7,385 feet (2,251 m)
- Moose Mountain, 46°49′44″N 110°50′31″W, el. 7,641 feet (2,329 m)
- Mount Elmo, 46°16′38″N 110°26′55″W, el. 8,104 feet (2,470 m)
- Mount High, 46°42′37″N 110°16′29″W, el. 8,235 feet (2,510 m)
- Mount Howe, 46°30′52″N 110°26′41″W, el. 6,207 feet (1,892 m)
- Mount Vesuvius, 46°58′38″N 111°07′01″W, el. 6,788 feet (2,069 m)
- Muddy Mountain, 46°40′07″N 110°21′07″W, el. 7,500 feet (2,300 m)
- Old Baldy, 46°59′55″N 111°12′39″W, el. 6,798 feet (2,072 m)
- Porphyry Peak, 46°50′17″N 110°43′06″W, el. 8,195 feet (2,498 m)
- Punk Mountain, 46°17′01″N 110°37′58″W, el. 6,693 feet (2,040 m)
- Quail Hill, 46°18′34″N 110°39′52″W, el. 6,243 feet (1,903 m)
- Rees Hills, 46°13′04″N 110°39′36″W, el. 6,322 feet (1,927 m)
- Reservation Mountain, 46°19′39″N 110°40′21″W, el. 6,378 feet (1,944 m)
- Reynolds Mountain, 46°55′22″N 111°02′39″W, el. 7,169 feet (2,185 m)
- Scab Rock Mountain, 46°12′38″N 110°33′38″W, el. 7,884 feet (2,403 m)
- Sheep Mountain, 46°46′24″N 111°01′33″W, el. 6,375 feet (1,943 m)
- Sky Peak, 46°56′43″N 111°06′55″W, el. 5,928 feet (1,807 m)
- Smoky Mountain, 46°43′27″N 110°45′04″W, el. 7,677 feet (2,340 m)
- Songster Butte, 46°50′26″N 111°11′38″W, el. 5,440 feet (1,660 m)
- Strawberry Butte, 46°46′44″N 110°53′58″W, el. 5,840 feet (1,780 m)
- Target Rock, 46°12′19″N 110°25′00″W, el. 8,041 feet (2,451 m)
- Taylor Hills, 46°58′00″N 111°02′02″W, el. 6,174 feet (1,882 m)
- Virginia Peak, 46°13′52″N 110°27′43″W, el. 8,770 feet (2,670 m)
- Volcano Butte, 46°39′15″N 110°41′50″W, el. 6,188 feet (1,886 m)
- Wapiti Peak, 46°28′00″N 110°45′20″W, el. 8,527 feet (2,599 m)
- Williams Mountain, 46°54′42″N 110°58′28″W, el. 7,592 feet (2,314 m)
- Willow Peak, 46°27′58″N 110°46′11″W, el. 8,366 feet (2,550 m)
- Wolf Hill, 46°11′58″N 110°38′48″W, el. 6,657 feet (2,029 m)
- Woodchuck Mountain, 46°28′52″N 110°45′49″W, el. 8,258 feet (2,517 m)
- Woods Mountain, 46°55′52″N 111°04′26″W, el. 7,533 feet (2,296 m)

== See also ==
- List of mountains in Montana
- List of mountain ranges in Montana
