= Lennep, Montana =

- Unincorporated community
- Location within Montana Location within the United States
- Coordinates: 46°24′58″N 110°32′36″W
- Country: United States
- State: Montana
- County: Meagher
- Elevation: 5,240 ft (1,600 m)
- Time zone: UTC-7 (Mountain (MST))
  - Summer (DST): UTC-6 (MDT)
- ZIP code: 59053
- Area code: 406
- GNIS feature ID: 786050

Lennep is a ghost town and populated place in Meagher County, Montana, United States.

Lennep has a still-active Lutheran church, and 3 inhabited houses (as of 2023). Closed buildings include a two-story general store/post office, and a K-8 school. Lennep is located at the foot of the Castle Mountains, and has a south view of the north end of the Crazy Mountains. Lennep is in the valley that divides the two ranges, that contains the South Fork of the Musselshell River. Lennep was once a station on the Old Milwaukee Road. A trackside signal can still be seen along Jawbone Road, where train tracks were removed over 30 years ago. The Lennep Mercantile housed the post office from the time the Mercantile opened in 1914; the post office had first opened in 1903 in a log home across the street. The post office was closed down in 1962.

Today Lennep is a sparsely occupied tourist attraction, with a number of buildings remaining and in reasonable condition, including the church, school, and store. Lennep is surrounded by beef cattle pastures/hay fields. There are still rural residences in the surrounding vicinity of Lennep, including substantial working ranches.

== Climate ==
Climate data for Lennep 5 SW, Montana, 1991–2020 normals, 1959-2020 extremes: 5600ft (1707m)
Month	Jan	Feb	Mar	Apr	May	Jun	Jul	Aug	Sep	Oct	Nov	Dec	Year
Record high °F (°C)	59 (15)	59 (15)	70 (21)	79 (26)	83 (28)	90 (32)	99 (37)	96 (36)	95 (35)	83 (28)	69 (21)	62 (17)	99 (37)
Mean maximum °F (°C)	46.6 (8.1)	48.9 (9.4)	57.7 (14.3)	68.8 (20.4)	75.5 (24.2)	82.6 (28.1)	88.5 (31.4)	88.6 (31.4)	84.0 (28.9)	74.0 (23.3)	58.6 (14.8)	46.7 (8.2)	88.6 (31.4)
Mean daily maximum °F (°C)	30.9 (−0.6)	32.0 (0.0)	40.2 (4.6)	47.8 (8.8)	57.5 (14.2)	66.4 (19.1)	76.9 (24.9)	76.6 (24.8)	66.1 (18.9)	51.5 (10.8)	38.1 (3.4)	30.1 (−1.1)	51.2 (10.6)
Daily mean °F (°C)	21.9 (−5.6)	21.9 (−5.6)	29.0 (−1.7)	35.9 (2.2)	44.9 (7.2)	52.5 (11.4)	60.1 (15.6)	58.9 (14.9)	50.3 (10.2)	39.1 (3.9)	28.5 (−1.9)	21.4 (−5.9)	38.7 (3.7)
Mean daily minimum °F (°C)	12.8 (−10.7)	11.8 (−11.2)	17.7 (−7.9)	23.9 (−4.5)	32.2 (0.1)	38.6 (3.7)	43.2 (6.2)	41.3 (5.2)	34.5 (1.4)	26.6 (−3.0)	19.0 (−7.2)	12.6 (−10.8)	26.2 (−3.2)
Mean minimum °F (°C)	−13.9 (−25.5)	−11.4 (−24.1)	−2.8 (−19.3)	9.7 (−12.4)	18.6 (−7.4)	28.5 (−1.9)	34.5 (1.4)	31.0 (−0.6)	22.4 (−5.3)	8.5 (−13.1)	−3.5 (−19.7)	−12.6 (−24.8)	−22.8 (−30.4)
Record low °F (°C)	−38 (−39)	−44 (−42)	−30 (−34)	−10 (−23)	11 (−12)	18 (−8)	28 (−2)	20 (−7)	10 (−12)	−15 (−26)	−32 (−36)	−40 (−40)	−44 (−42)
Average precipitation inches (mm)	0.99 (25)	0.86 (22)	1.07 (27)	1.86 (47)	3.06 (78)	2.92 (74)	1.49 (38)	1.32 (34)	1.33 (34)	1.58 (40)	1.05 (27)	0.98 (25)	18.51 (471)
Average snowfall inches (cm)	17.00 (43.2)	13.30 (33.8)	15.50 (39.4)	12.50 (31.8)	2.50 (6.4)	0.30 (0.76)	0.00 (0.00)	0.00 (0.00)	0.90 (2.3)	7.90 (20.1)	12.50 (31.8)	13.20 (33.5)	95.6 (243.06)
Source 1: NOAA
Source 2: XMACIS2 (records & monthly max/mins)
