= Meagher County, Montana =

County in Montana, United States

- County
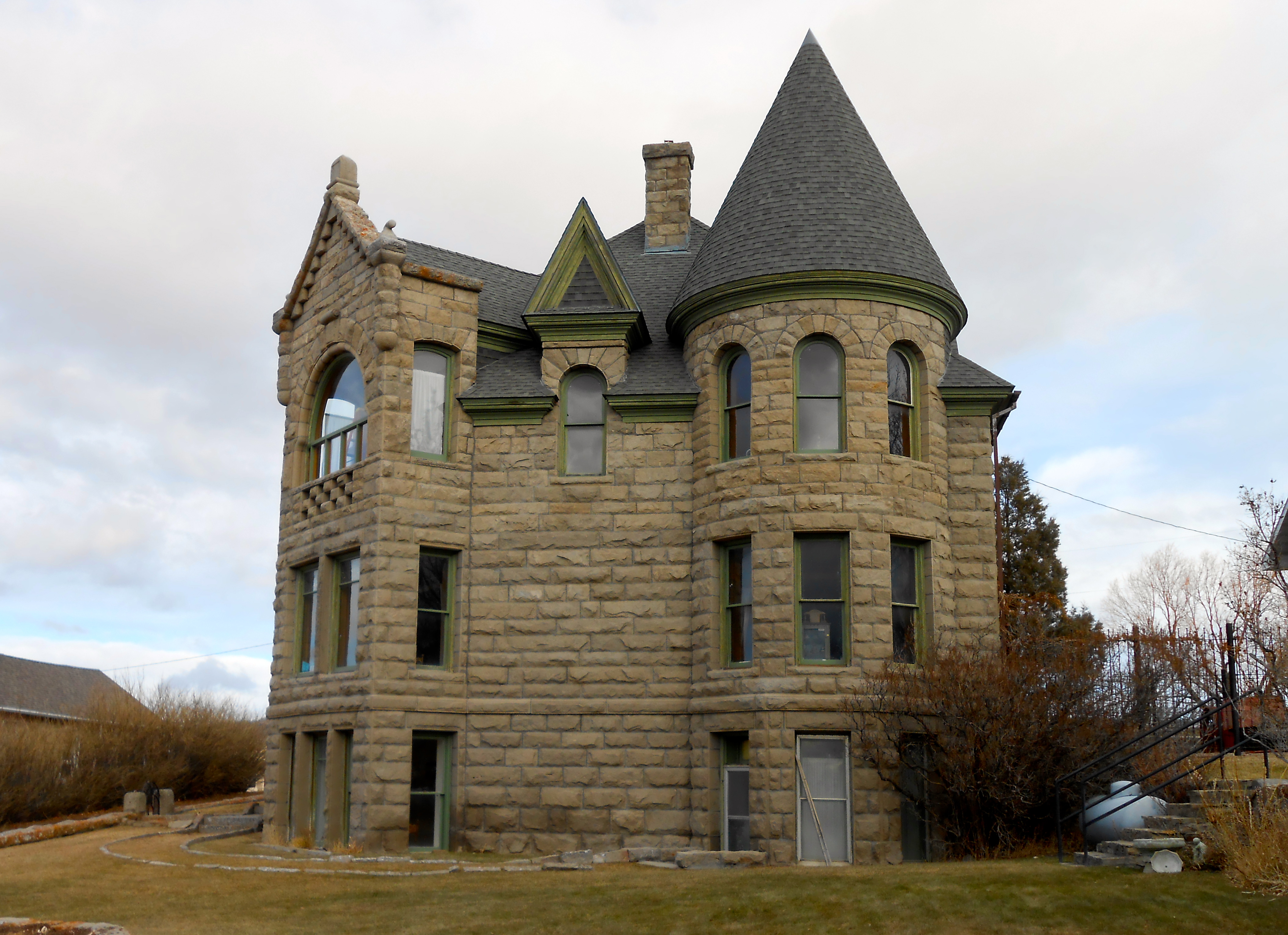
- The Castle of White Sulphur Springs

- Location within the U.S. state of Montana
- Coordinates: 46°48′47″N 111°12′36″W
- Country: United States
- State: Montana
- Founded: November 16, 1867
- Named for: Thomas Francis Meagher
- Seat: White Sulphur Springs
- Largest city: White Sulphur Springs

Area
  - Total: 2,395 sq mi (6,200 km^{2})
  - Land: 2,392 sq mi (6,200 km^{2})
  - Water: 2.8 sq mi (7.3 km^{2}) 0.1%

Population (2020)
  - Total: 1,927
  - Estimate (2025): 2,137 ▲
  - Density: 0.9/sq mi (0.35/km^{2})
- Time zone: UTC−7 (Mountain)
  - Summer (DST): UTC−6 (MDT)
- Congressional district: 2nd
- Website: www.meagherco.com
- Montana county number 47

Meagher County (/mɑːr/ MAR) is a county located in the U.S. state of Montana. As of the 2020 census, the population was 1,927. Its county seat is White Sulphur Springs.

According to the United States Census Bureau, the 2010 center of population of Montana is located in Meagher County at 46.78°N 111.3°W

== History ==
Meagher County was named for Thomas Francis Meagher, territorial governor of Montana.

The first county seat was Diamond City, the main city of the Confederate Gulch mining district. This area is no longer part of Meagher County, but today lies in neighboring Broadwater County.

== Geography ==
According to the United States Census Bureau, the county has a total area of 2,395 square miles (6,200 km^{2}), of which 2,392 square miles (6,200 km^{2}) is land and 2.8 square miles (7.3 km^{2}) (0.1%) is water.

=== Major highways ===
- U.S. Highway 12
- U.S. Highway 89

=== Adjacent counties ===
- Cascade County - north
- Judith Basin County - northeast
- Wheatland County - east
- Sweet Grass County - southeast
- Park County - south
- Gallatin County - south
- Broadwater County - west
- Lewis and Clark County - northwest

=== National protected areas ===
- Gallatin National Forest (part)
- Helena National Forest (part)
- Lewis and Clark National Forest (part)

== Demographics ==
Historical population
Census	Pop.	Note	%±
1870	1,387		—
1880	2,743		97.8%
1890	4,749		73.1%
1900	2,526		−46.8%
1910	4,190		65.9%
1920	2,622		−37.4%
1930	2,272		−13.3%
1940	2,237		−1.5%
1950	2,079		−7.1%
1960	2,616		25.8%
1970	2,122		−18.9%
1980	2,154		1.5%
1990	1,819		−15.6%
2000	1,932		6.2%
2010	1,891		−2.1%
2020	1,927		1.9%
2025 (est.)	2,137	▲	10.9%
U.S. Decennial Census

=== 2020 census ===
As of the 2020 census, the county had a population of 1,927. Of the residents, 17.4% were under the age of 18 and 28.5% were 65 years of age or older; the median age was 53.2 years. For every 100 females there were 106.1 males, and for every 100 females age 18 and over there were 105.3 males. No residents lived in urban areas and 100.0% lived in rural areas.

The racial makeup of the county was 92.8% White, 0.7% Black or African American, 0.2% American Indian and Alaska Native, 0.2% Asian, 0.5% from some other race, and 5.6% from two or more races. Hispanic or Latino residents of any race comprised 2.4% of the population.

There were 862 households in the county, of which 20.6% had children under the age of 18 living with them and 21.0% had a female householder with no spouse or partner present. About 32.8% of all households were made up of individuals and 15.9% had someone living alone who was 65 years of age or older.

There were 1,352 housing units, of which 36.2% were vacant. Among occupied housing units, 71.1% were owner-occupied and 28.9% were renter-occupied. The homeowner vacancy rate was 4.4% and the rental vacancy rate was 6.7%.

=== 2010 census ===
As of the 2010 census, there were 1,891 people, 806 households, and 509 families in the county. The population density was 0.8 inhabitants per square mile (0.31/km^{2}). There were 1,432 housing units at an average density of 0.6 units per square mile (0.23/km^{2}). The racial makeup of the county was 97.9% white, 0.3% Asian, 0.3% American Indian, 0.1% black or African American, 0.1% from other races, and 1.3% from two or more races. Those of Hispanic or Latino origin made up 1.5% of the population. In terms of ancestry, 38.6% were German, 14.3% were Norwegian, 13.6% were Irish, 11.0% were English, 5.9% were Scotch-Irish, and 3.2% were American.

Of the 806 households, 20.8% had children under the age of 18 living with them, 54.6% were married couples living together, 6.2% had a female householder with no husband present, 36.8% were non-families, and 33.3% of all households were made up of individuals. The average household size was 2.13 and the average family size was 2.67. The median age was 50.1 years.

The median income for a household in the county was $31,577 and the median income for a family was $40,057. Males had a median income of $30,556 versus $16,414 for females. The per capita income for the county was $17,318. About 14.1% of families and 19.0% of the population were below the poverty line, including 21.7% of those under age 18 and 13.0% of those age 65 or over.

== Politics ==
This county has a strong Republican lean. This was one of 12 counties in Montana that Barry Goldwater won in 1964. A Democrat has not won since Franklin D. Roosevelt in 1940.

United States presidential election results for Meagher County, Montana
Year	Republican		Democratic		Third party(ies)	
Year	No.	%	No.	%	No.	%
1904	485	66.90%	230	31.72%	10	1.38%
1908	495	59.57%	314	37.79%	22	2.65%
1912	321	26.77%	473	39.45%	405	33.78%
1916	1,158	43.10%	1,482	55.15%	47	1.75%
1920	744	69.08%	314	29.16%	19	1.76%
1924	624	59.60%	257	24.55%	166	15.85%
1928	714	67.94%	335	31.87%	2	0.19%
1932	462	41.96%	621	56.40%	18	1.63%
1936	495	38.67%	767	59.92%	18	1.41%
1940	520	44.94%	621	53.67%	16	1.38%
1944	509	51.26%	482	48.54%	2	0.20%
1948	518	50.05%	497	48.02%	20	1.93%
1952	792	70.71%	326	29.11%	2	0.18%
1956	712	66.73%	355	33.27%	0	0.00%
1960	613	58.49%	431	41.13%	4	0.38%
1964	506	55.42%	405	44.36%	2	0.22%
1968	543	62.92%	218	25.26%	102	11.82%
1972	674	71.55%	230	24.42%	38	4.03%
1976	565	60.17%	364	38.76%	10	1.06%
1980	689	69.60%	247	24.95%	54	5.45%
1984	771	72.12%	283	26.47%	15	1.40%
1988	656	65.01%	337	33.40%	16	1.59%
1992	422	42.12%	260	25.95%	320	31.94%
1996	505	53.95%	281	30.02%	150	16.03%
2000	698	74.65%	176	18.82%	61	6.52%
2004	698	71.74%	247	25.39%	28	2.88%
2008	624	64.60%	298	30.85%	44	4.55%
2012	670	68.93%	269	27.67%	33	3.40%
2016	729	74.62%	193	19.75%	55	5.63%
2020	833	75.05%	258	23.24%	19	1.71%
2024	888	75.77%	256	21.84%	28	2.39%

== Communities ==
=== City ===
- White Sulphur Springs (county seat)

=== Census-designated places ===
- Martinsdale
- Springdale Colony

=== Other unincorporated communities ===
- Castle Town
- Checkerboard
- Copperopolis
- Fort Logan
- Hamen
- Lennep
- Loweth
- Moss Agate
- Moyne
- Ringling
- Sixteen

=== Individual residences (identified on aerial map) ===
- Ford Place

== See also ==
- List of lakes in Meagher County, Montana
- Confederate Gulch and Diamond City (historically in Meagher County, but now in Broadwater County)
- List of mountains in Meagher County, Montana
- National Register of Historic Places listings in Meagher County, Montana
