= White Sulphur Springs and Yellowstone Park Railway =

The White Sulphur Springs and Yellowstone Park Railway (reporting mark WSYP), now defunct, was an American railroad built and operated between the towns of Ringling and White Sulphur Springs, Montana, a distance of 22.8 miles. The railroad, constructed in 1910, provided White Sulphur Springs with a link to the national railway network via a connection with the Chicago, Milwaukee, St. Paul and Pacific Railroad ("the Milwaukee Road") at Ringling (Formerly Leader, Montana, renamed after John Ringling). The southern four miles of the railroad's route, between Ringling and Dorsey, were leased from the Milwaukee Road.

Lew Penwell, the promoter and builder of the railroad, envisioned that White Sulphur Springs would boom as a tourist center. The Montana Daily Record reported that $3,000,000 would be spent developing the Smith River valley and build a grand hotel at White Sulphur Springs.

The railroad did a study to extend to Cascade, on the Missouri River, and there were rumors that it might build to Helena, Montana, to replace the stagecoach route.

Milwaukee Road had a majority interest in the railroad of 51%, and supplied it with rolling stock and one locomotive. Milwaukee rotated the locomotives that were used on the WSS&YP due to the pure water available at White Sulphur Springs, which removed build-up and scale from the boiler.

WSS&YP employees were expected to do whatever task needed to be done regardless of job description, from selling tickets to shoveling snow.

The railroad was nearly abandoned in 1944, but was saved by George A. Wetherell III and W.C. Ramsey, who bought out the Milwaukee's interest. Business boomed again with the shipping of lumber cut from the nearby mountains.

The railroad was abandoned in 1980, a consequence of the Milwaukee Road abandoning its line through Ringling. The station in White Sulphur Springs still stands after being restored for the movie Heartland in 1982. A heavyweight coach and sleeper sit in front of the station along with a Milwaukee Road ballast car and a stock car, marooned far away from the nearest rail system. An ancient WSS&YP combination car sits in a farmer's field nearby.
