= Loco Mountain (Meagher County, Montana) =

Mountain in Montana, United States

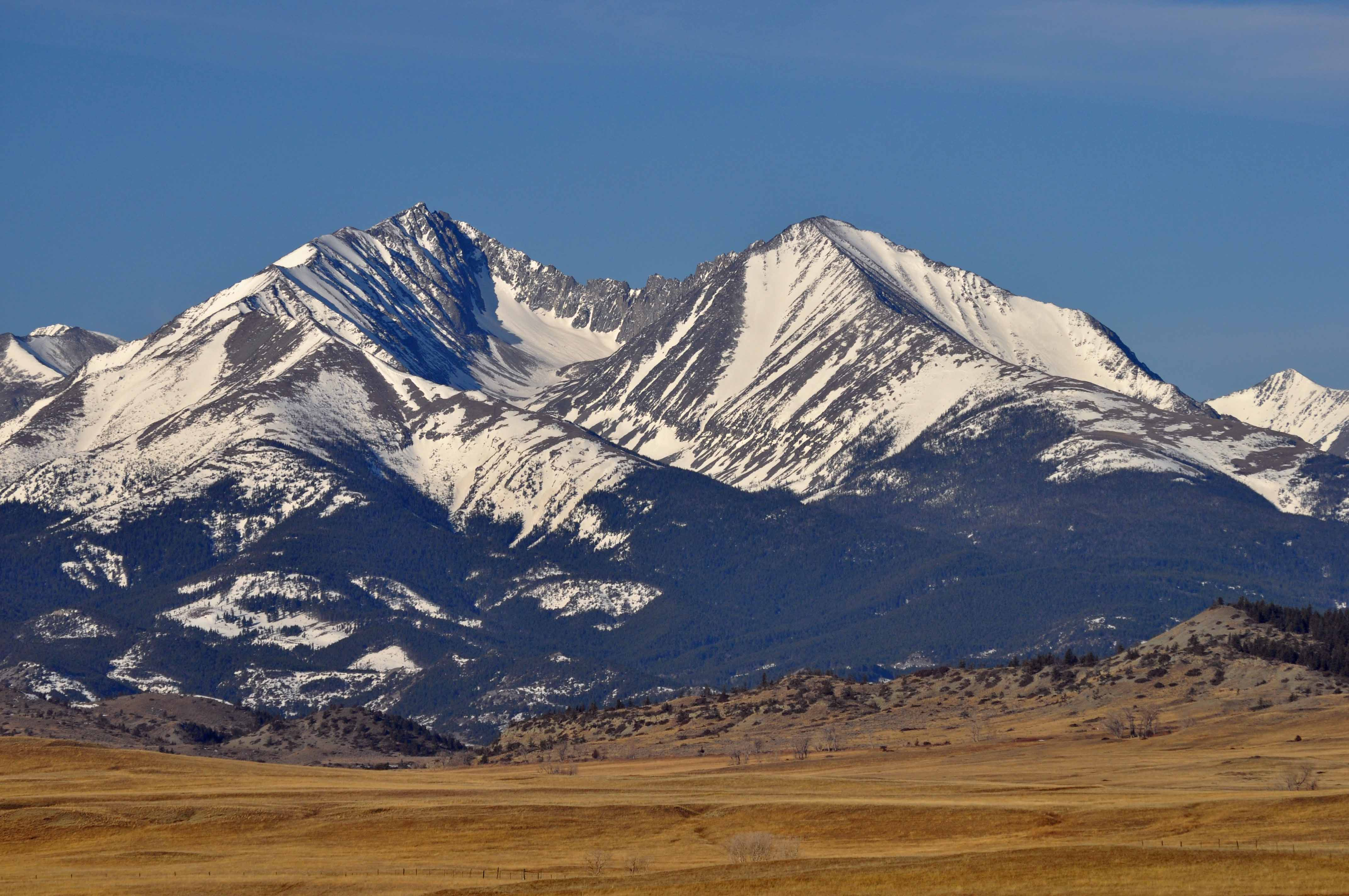
- Loco Mountain (left) from Hwy 191

Highest point
- Elevation: 9,242 feet (2,817 m)
- Prominence: 1,559 feet (475 m)
- Isolation: 11.61 miles (18.68 km)
- Coordinates: 46°13′29″N 110°20′09″W

Geography
- Location within Montana

Loco Mountain, el. 9,242 feet (2,817 m) is a mountain peak on the eastern face of the Crazy Mountains in Meagher County, Montana. It is located within the Lewis and Clark National Forest.

== See also ==
- Mountains in Meagher County, Montana
