= Sixteen, Montana =

Coordinates: 46°12′55″N 110°59′52″W

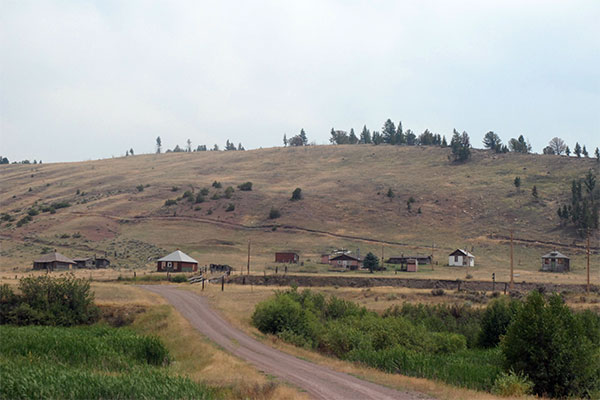
Surviving buildings at the ghost town of Sixteen, Montana, August 2007.

Sixteen is a former unincorporated community in southwestern Meagher County, Montana, United States. The town was a station stop on the transcontinental main line of the Chicago, Milwaukee, St. Paul and Pacific Railroad ("the Milwaukee Road"), and was a community center for regional ranchers and homesteaders. The rail line through Sixteen was originally constructed in 1895 by the Montana Railroad, and the town served as a base camp for railway construction crews.

The town took its name from Sixteen Mile Creek, which runs through the narrow valley containing the village. Sixteen Mile Canyon, immediately west of the town, was considered a scenic highlight of the Milwaukee Road line. Eagle Nest Tunnel, an engineering feature of the railroad, remains intact and is located about four miles west of Sixteen.

The Sixteen post office was first opened in 1890, closed initially in 1904, reopened in 1905, and stayed open until 1944.

The population of Sixteen was never large, and the town was nearly deserted by the late 20th century. The railroad through the area was abandoned in 1980, and Sixteen is now a ghost town, albeit with fewer than ten full-time residents.
