= Emmanuel Taylor Gordon =

American singer (1893–1972)

- Born: April 29, 1893; White Sulphur Springs, Montana, U.S.
- Died: May 5, 1971 (aged 78); White Sulphur Springs, Montana, U.S.
- Occupations: Singer, vaudeville performer

Emmanuel Taylor Gordon (April 29, 1893 – May 5, 1971) was an American singer and vaudeville performer associated with the Harlem Renaissance in the mid-1920s. He was born in White Sulphur Springs, Montana, and moved to New York City at the age of 17. His career faded after the 1920s, and in 1959 he retired to White Sulphur Springs, where he died in 1971. In addition to his singing career, Gordon is remembered today for his 1929 autobiography, Born to Be, which recounts his youth as an Afro-American in small-town Montana, and his experiences in 1920s Harlem.
