= Byron R. Sherman House =

Historic building in Montana, US

- U.S. National Register of Historic Places
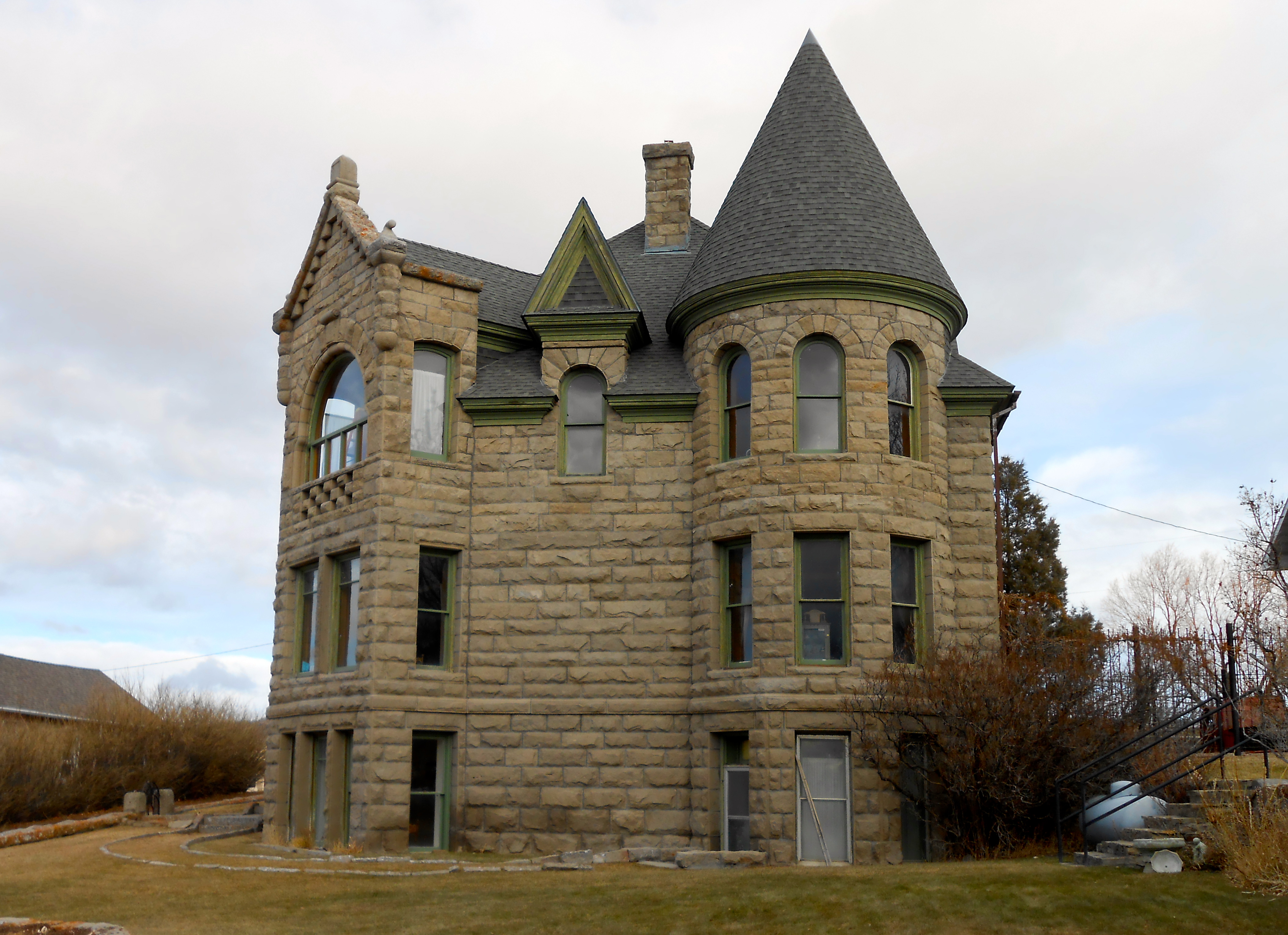
- "The Castle"

- Location within Montana Location within the United States
- Location: 310 2nd Ave., NE, White Sulphur Springs, Montana
- Coordinates: 46°33′03″N 110°54′00″W
- Area: 0.7 acres (0.28 ha)
- Built: 1890
- Architect: Mr. Soos
- Architectural style: Romanesque
- NRHP reference No.: 77000820
- Added to NRHP: September 15, 1977

The Byron R. Sherman House, also known as The Castle or The Castle of White Sulphur Springs, is a site on the National Register of Historic Places located in White Sulphur Springs, Montana, United States. It was added to the Register on September 15, 1977. The property includes a carriage house.

The Castle Museum is operated by the Meagher County Historical Society. It includes period furniture, photos, mineral samples, clothing and artifacts from the region's past.

It is a two-story granite mansion upon an elevated basement on a hilltop overlooking the City of White Sulphur Springs. According to its NRHP nomination, "with its heavily rusticated stone (the back, or east facade is laid up in field stone), [it] is a very fine frontier rendition of the late 19th century Romanesque Style." It is squarish, about 40 by 40 feet (12 m × 12 m) in plan, with addition of two full height towers on the south side.
