= Rob Quist =

American singer, instrumentalist, songwriter, and politician

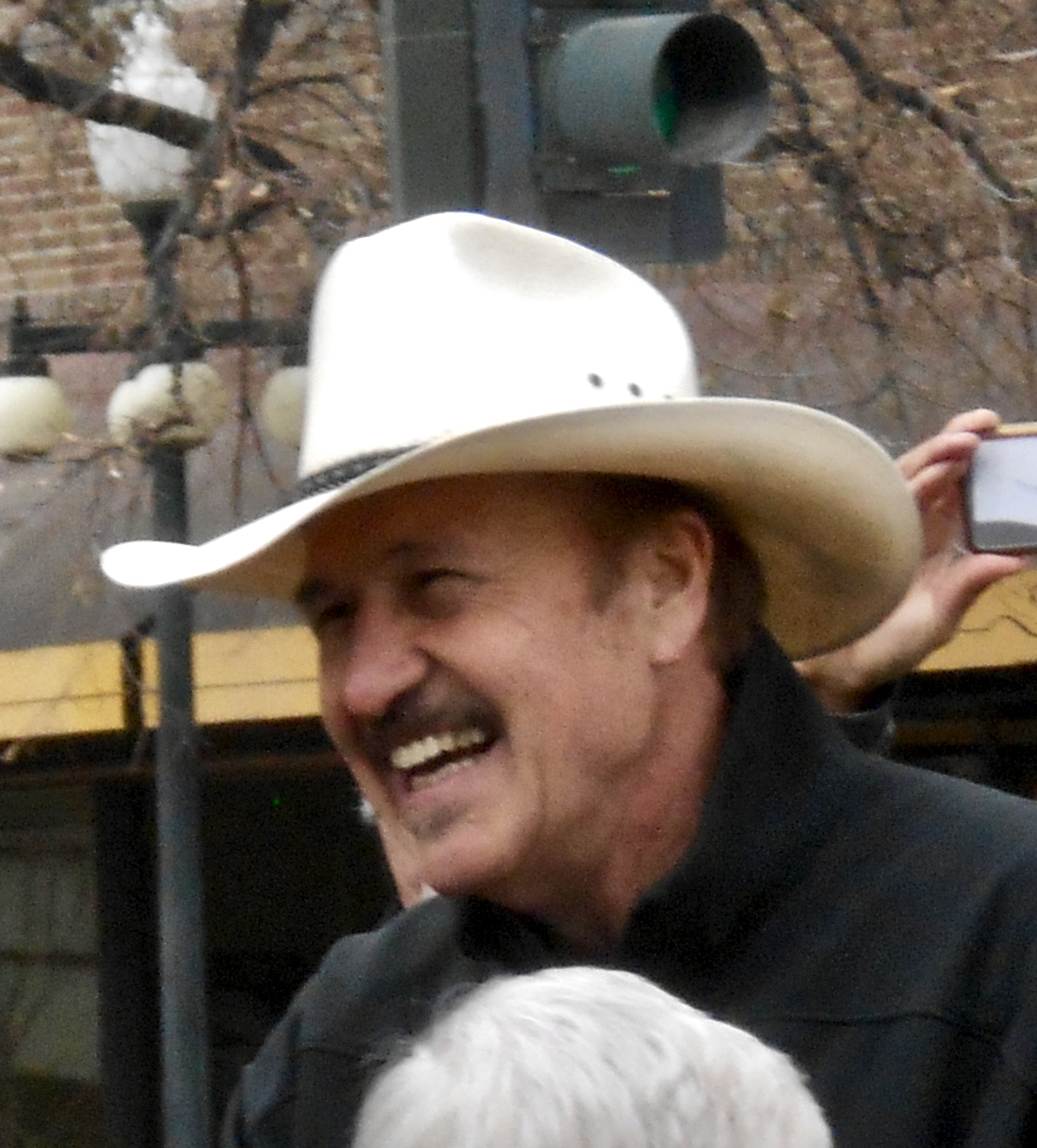
- Quist in 2017
- Born: Robert Ernest Quist; January 5, 1948 (age 78); Cut Bank, Montana, U.S.
- Education: University of Montana (BA)
- Occupations: Singer–songwriter, politician
- Political party: Democratic
- Spouse: Bonni Willows (m. 1979)
- Children: 2
- Musical career
- Genres: Country; bluegrass
- Instruments: Vocals; guitar; banjo

Robert Ernest Quist (born January 5, 1948) is an American musician and politician, known for his work in bluegrass and country music. Originally a founding member of the Mission Mountain Wood Band, he plays guitar and banjo in addition to singing and songwriting. His songs have also been recorded by artists Michael Martin Murphey and Loretta Lynn, among others.

Known as a musical and cultural ambassador for his native state of Montana, Quist was appointed to the Montana Arts Council by Montana Governor Brian Schweitzer. Quist was the unsuccessful Democratic Party nominee for Montana's at-large congressional district in the 2017 special election.

== Early life ==
Born January 5, 1948, in Cut Bank, Montana, Quist began singing at a young age and learned to play multiple instruments, including trombone and cello. As a high school senior, he led the Cut Bank Wolves to the 1966 Class B Boys State basketball championship under coach Willie Degroot before playing basketball at the University of Montana. While at UM, he also successfully auditioned to join the Jubileers singing group. While in the Jubileers he met Steve Riddle, and the two decided to form a band which eventually evolved into the Mission Mountain Wood Band.

== 1970s and 1980s career ==
The Mission Mountain Wood Band was a bluegrass and country rock band that played their first public performance opening for the band Rare Earth in 1971. The group went on to tour nationally and opened for many notable acts of the era, but were also popular headliners in their local region for events such as the University of Montana's Aber Day kegger. They performed on national television on shows such as Hee Haw and the ABC Cheryl Ladd Special. After the band broke up in 1982, Quist joined with fellow members Terry Robinson and Kurt Bergeron to form the Montana Band, which continued to tour extensively and took first prize in the Willie Nelson country challenge. Quist had left the Montana band prior to a tragic plane crash that killed Robinson, Bergeron and the other members of the band.

== Solo career ==
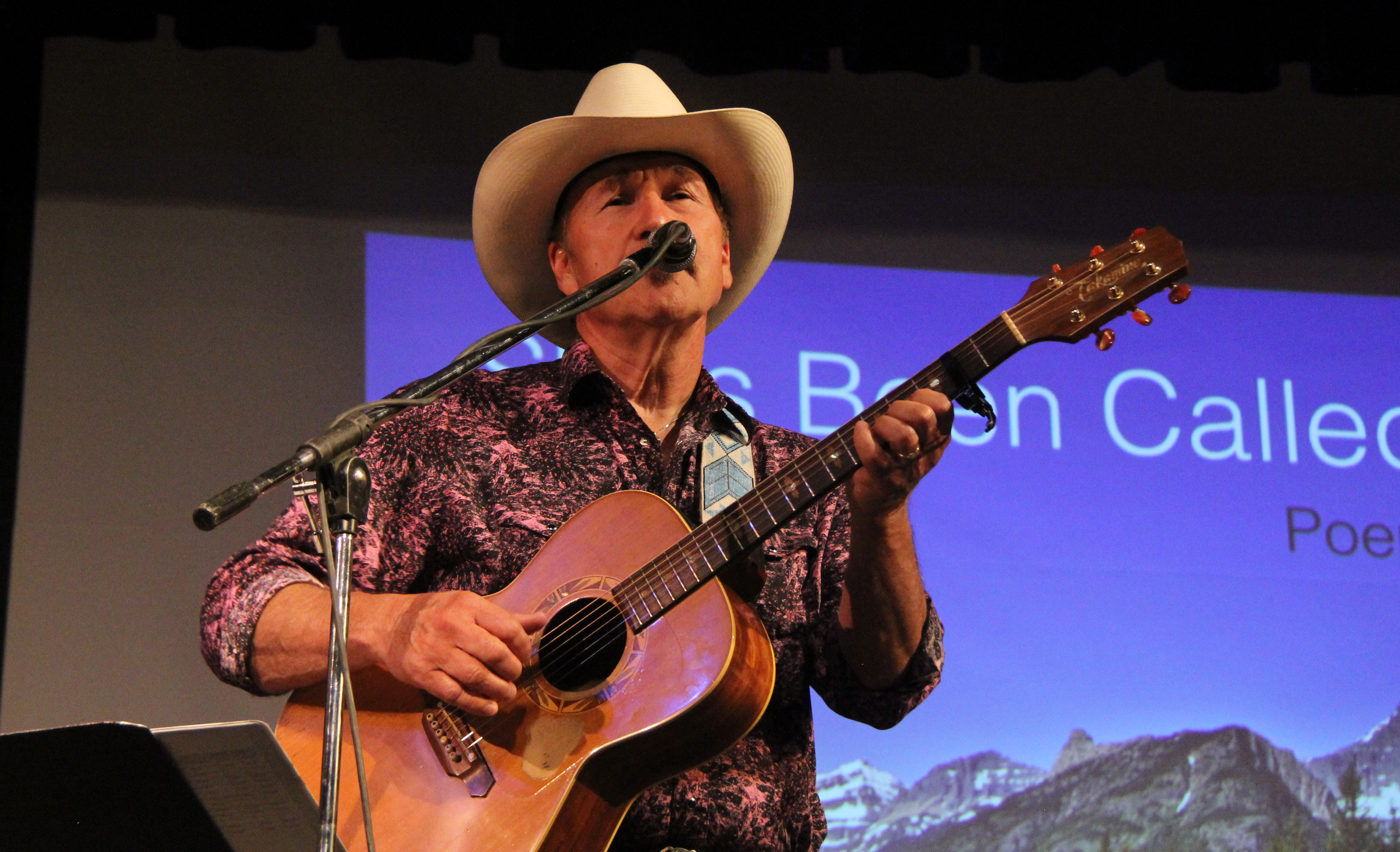
Quist performing in 2014

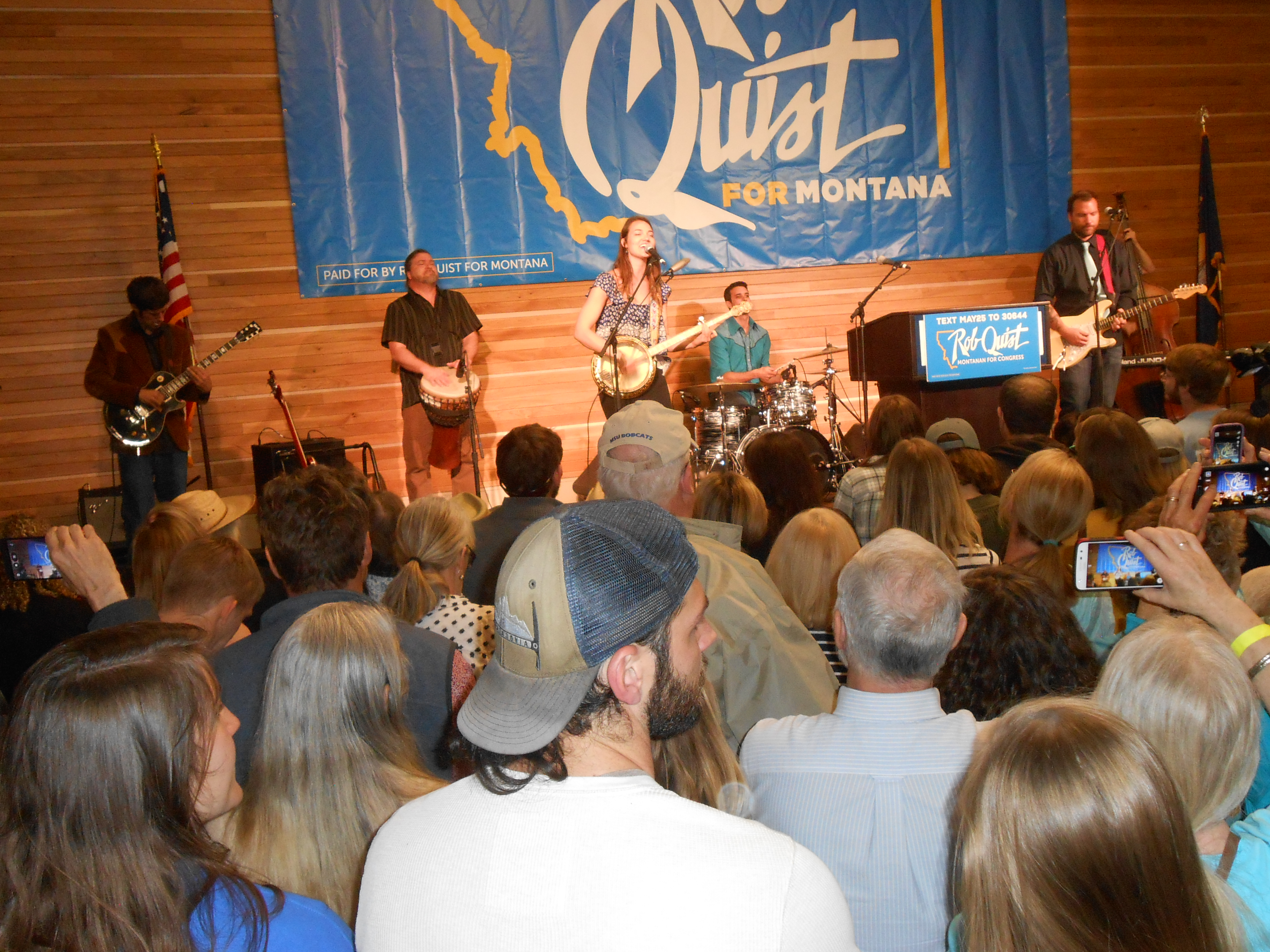
"Team Quist and the Berners" 2017 campaign rally appearance featuring Quist's grown children Halladay (with banjo) and Guthrie (guitarist to right of lectern)

As a solo performer Quist formed a backup band called Great Northern. He periodically reunites with the surviving members of the Mission Mountain Wood Band for a small number of concerts.

Rob Quist and Great Northern have performed his original music with the North Dakota State Symphony, the Fairbanks (Alaska) Symphony, the Glacier Orchestra as well as the Billings, Butte, Helena and Missoula Symphonies. He has written and recorded national television and radio ads for Levi's 501 Jeans, Amtrak's Empire Builder and Original Coors. His original song, "Blue Jean Love Affair" was heard in the Top 20 Country Music Markets.

During a stint in Nashville, Quist forged a songwriting partnership and enduring friendship with Michael Martin Murphey. Their partnership culminated in their song "Close to the Land" which became the theme song for the American Public Television program "America's Heartland." The song went on to win Song of the Year at the Texas Music Awards. His original song "America...Pass It On" and video featuring Jack Gladstone won a Finalist Award at the International Wildlife Film Festival for National Geographic, received airplay on Public Television and featured at many Interpretive Centers throughout the United States. Quist has released 15 CDs of mostly original music about the lives and history of the people of Montana and the West, placing his songs on Billboard and Independent Charts. Quist received airplay in Great Britain, Belgium, Italy, Japan and Switzerland. Both as a solo artist and with M2WB, Quist appeared with a number of musical acts including Heart, the Nitty Gritty Dirt Band, Jimmy Buffett, Dolly Parton, The Allman Brothers Band, Ozark Mountain Daredevils, Bonnie Raitt, the Charlie Daniels Band, Tim McGraw, Martina McBride, and Jay Leno.

Quist has been featured on CBS National News in a segment called "Country Comes to New York"; he was a guest artist on the Riders in the Sky national radio show "Riders Radio Theater" as well as Montana Public Television. He composed original music for the Montana Repertory Theatre Production "Voice of The Prairie" and original songs for a production about rodeo in present-day Montana, tentatively titled "Cowboy Up."

Quist was one of the first honorees to be inducted into the University of Montana School of Fine Art's "Hall of Honors", saluted as "a celebrated Montana musician and composer who has captured the spirit of the West in his music, an evocative and versatile artist whose gift of song has touched the hearts and souls of his countrymen, an eloquent proponent of the history and beauty of the West whose legacy in song will be embraced by generations to follow."

== Politics ==
=== 2017 Montana special election ===
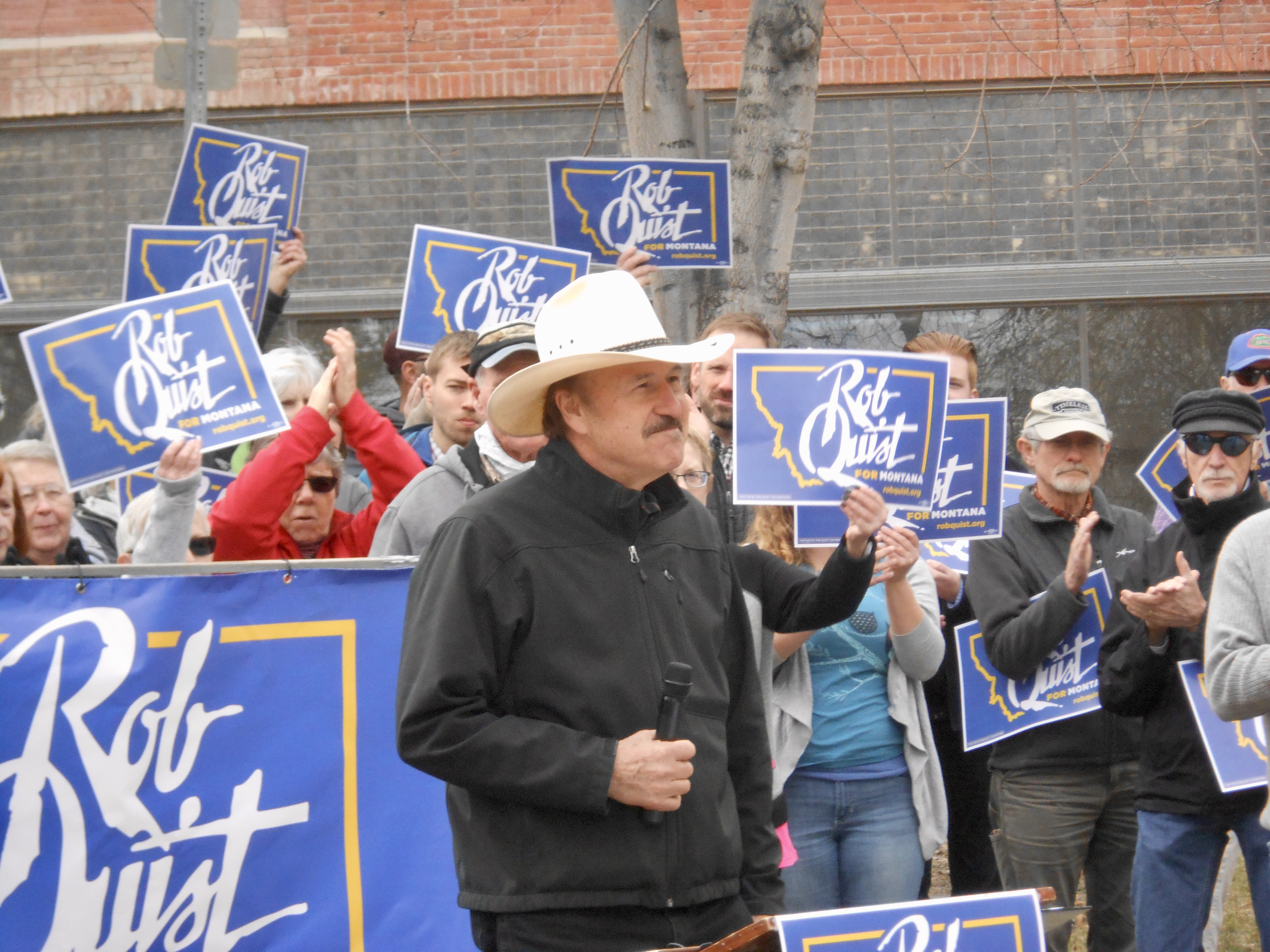
Quist at a March 2017 campaign rally

On January 4, 2017, Quist announced he would seek the Democratic nomination for the special election that was anticipated to fill the U.S. House seat held by Ryan Zinke, as Zinke was expected to be nominated to be Secretary of the Interior. Quist was endorsed early on by former Governor Brian Schweitzer, and was selected as the Party's nominee on March 5. Quist stated, "I was approached by people who I really respect and they asked me to run. And my first thought was 'Wait a minute, I'm not a politician.' Their response was, 'exactly.'" Quist cited as qualifications his work with the state government, lifelong experience traveling in and around Montana, and his upbringing in a ranching family. Independent Senator Bernie Sanders as well as the organization Our Revolution endorsed Quist in the race and campaigned for him.

The special election was announced by Governor Steve Bullock on March 1 and set for May 25, the minimum 85 days required after Zinke's confirmation. The race generated considerable national attention, and over $17 million was spent, much of it by outside groups and on television ads, with Quist and third-party organizations supporting him being outspent by about four to one by his opponent Greg Gianforte and Gianforte's supporters.

Quist was endorsed by a number of politically progressive organizations as well as various unions, environmental organizations and sportsmen's groups. Quist's opponent had been endorsed over Quist by three Montana newspapers, the Billings Gazette, the Missoulian, and the Helena Independent Record, all owned by Lee Enterprises. However, the day before the election, Gianforte assaulted Ben Jacobs, a reporter from The Guardian, an incident captured on audio recording and which was witnessed by reporters from Fox News. Gianforte was charged with a misdemeanor for the incident. As news broke, the editorial boards of these three newspapers rescinded previous endorsements of Gianforte. However, as many voters had already cast early voting ballots, the incident had relatively little impact on the election. Gianforte later pled guilty.

Quist lost the general election to Gianforte, 50% to 44%, with Libertarian Mark Wicks receiving 6%. This result was the highest percentage of the vote for a Democrat in a Montana house race in the past four election cycles.

=== Political positions ===
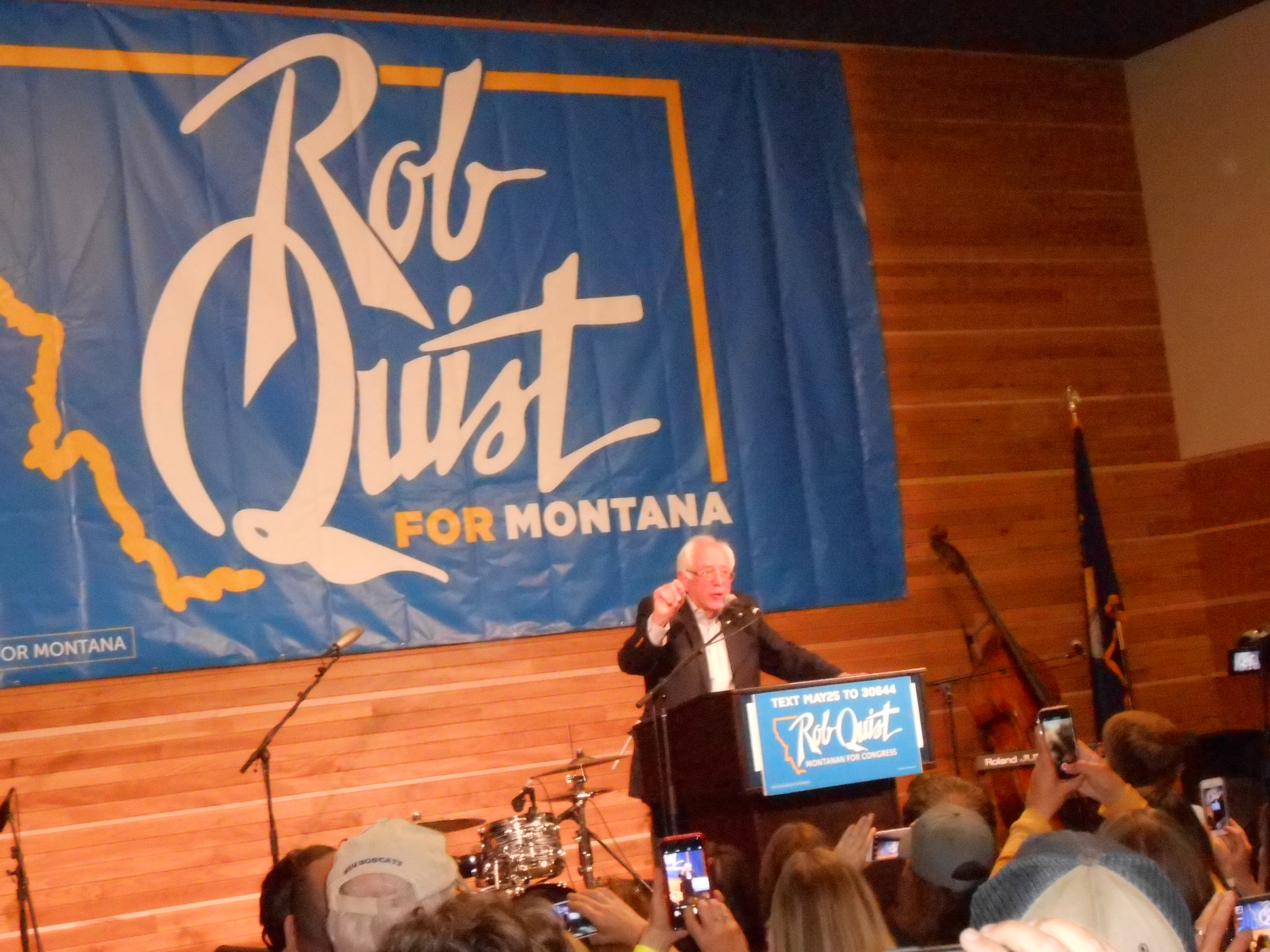
Bernie Sanders campaigned with Quist the weekend prior to the 2017 special election

Politico described Quist's policies as "an economic fairness platform" and "a commitment to Montana's particular brand of prairie populism." According to the Washington Post, the Quist campaign opted not to turn the special election into a referendum on Trump's alleged scandals, but to focus on "policy decisions by the president and congressional Republicans."

Quist thinks the country should eventually move to a single-payer healthcare system. Quist opposed efforts to repeal the Patient Protection and Affordable Care Act (Obamacare), stating in 2017 that doing so would "raise healthcare costs for working Montanans", which is consistent with an analysis by the Kaiser Family Foundation, and be a "tax cut for millionaires".

Quist has criticized inequality in the United States, and argued that tax breaks for the rich exacerbates the inequality. He has called for tax cuts for the working class.

Quist opposes the privatization of federal lands, military intervention and regime change, as well as any form of religious ban or registry. Quist has called for transferring money from the federal military budget "towards health care or Social Security". Quist supports a constitutional amendment to overturn the Citizens United Supreme Court decision. He has called for investments in clean coal technology, as well as energy from wind, solar, biomass and geothermal sources.

Quist has pledged to protect public lands. Quist supports the legalization of marijuana, saying "the war on drugs has been an abject failure." Quist supports same-sex marriage. Quist supports access to birth control, preventive screenings and abortion rights. Quist has argued that "the assault on women's reproductive rights" must come to an end. He has called for pay equity for women.

Quist accepts the scientific consensus on climate change and supports actions to mitigate climate change, saying climate change "could have a serious impact on our farms, ranches, and our economy." By contrast, Gianforte "did not have specific ideas on how to address climate change." and opposed closing coal-fired power plants.

== Bibliography ==
- Parrett, Aaron (2016). Montana Americana Music: Boot Stomping in Big Sky Country. Arcadia Publishing. ISBN 9781625857859.
