= Mission Mountain Wood Band =

American bluegrass and country rock band

- Mission Mountain Wood Band 1977, L-R: Christian Johnson, Terry Robinson, Rob Quist, Greg Reichenberg, Steve Riddle.

Background information
- Also known as: M2WB, The Wood Band, The Montana Band
- Origin: Missoula, Montana, US
- Genres: Country rock, bluegrass
- Years active: 1971–present
- Members: Rob Quist; Steve Riddle; Greg Reichenberg; Tim Ryan; David Griffith; Trevor Krieger
- Past members: Christian Johnson (M2WB); Terry Robinson (M2WB) (Montana band)(d. 1987); Kurt Bergeron (M2WB)(Montana band)(d. 1987); Bruce Robinson (M2WB); Mark Wittman (Montana band); Jerry Zalnoski (Montana band); Clifford Tipton (Montana band)(d. 1987); Alan Larson (Montana band)(d. 1987); Grady Whitfield (Montana band)(d. 1987)
- Website: missionmountainwoodband.com

The Mission Mountain Wood Band, abbreviated M2WB, is an American bluegrass and country rock band formed in Missoula, Montana, US in 1971. They were noted for their vocal harmonies, multi-instrumental talent, and charismatic stage presence, particularly at Woodstock style regional concerts of the era such as the University of Montana's Aber Day Kegger. They spent time in New York City to further build their career, appeared on national television and toured 47 of the lower 48 states in a unique 1955 Greyhound Scenicruiser, performing up to 320 times a year both solo and as an opening act for other bands. The original five members were Rob Quist, Steve Riddle, Christian Johnson, Greg Reichenberg, and the late Terry Robinson, all of whom were UM students and born in Montana. Johnson was replaced with Kurt Bergeron after the band released their first album, In Without Knocking, in 1977. The band recorded two studio albums in their heyday, a third album after the band revamped as ‘’Montana’’, released a compilation of their older work in 2005, and put out two albums with new content in 2011 and 2014.

Personnel changes resulting from the departure of several original band members resulted in Quist, Robinson, Reichenberg, and Bergeron reforming the group as The Montana Band in 1981. They had some national success and, described as "well-adapted to today's modern country sound," were being favorably compared to major groups of the time such as Alabama and the Oak Ridge Boys. After the departure of Quist, Terry Robinson was the only remaining original band member when a plane crash killed all then-members of The Montana Band in 1987.

The surviving M2WB members reunited in 1992 and began to play periodic reunion concerts from that time forward, released a compilation of their work in 2005, and after adding new members to the band, produced two additional albums in 2011 and 2014. Their fan base and concert experience was compared favorably to that of the Grateful Dead. The band was the subject of a 2009 PBS documentary, Never Long Gone: The Mission Mountain Wood Band Story.

== Origins ==
The band was formed in 1971 when guitarist and banjo player Rob Quist, from Cut Bank, Montana and bassist Steve Riddle from Libby met as members of the University of Montana's "Jubileers", an audition-only singing group. They soon recruited other University of Montana (UM) students, starting with guitarist and Kalispell native Terry Robinson as lead vocalist. They performed as an acoustic three-piece group before adding two more UM students originally from Billings: Christian Johnson on guitar, mandolin and fiddle, and drummer Greg Reichenberg. They were mentored by Joseph Musselman, a music professor at the university, and all band members were proficient on at least two instruments. They took their band name from the nearby Mission Range of mountains.

Their public debut was in Bozeman, Montana in 1971 as the opening act for Rare Earth. Their band logo was designed by Missoula artist Monte Dolack. The band was influenced by folk and traditional country music traditions as well as contemporary bands of the time such as Crosby, Stills, Nash and Young. Band members also credit the influence of Jonathan Edwards. A 1974 fundraiser performance helped propel a then-young politician, Max Baucus, to victory in his first race for the United States House of Representatives. Baucus later returned the favor when as a U.S. Senator, he introduced the band (sitting in the balcony) from the floor of the Senate chambers as "Montana's Favorite Sons".

== Career ==
The Mission Mountain Wood Band's heyday ran from 1973 to 1981. Once they began touring, Riddle's older brother Dick took over from Musselman as the band's musical coach and manager. The elder Riddle had been in a touring folk band that had obtained a recording contract and put out an album in 1962, so had connections with the east coast music industry.

From 1973-1976, the band relocated to New York City, at times leaving the city to write and have band rehearsals in rural areas of New Jersey. They played in locations such as New York's CBGB’s and also toured nationally. They were the opening act at the 1973 Hells Angels Pirate Party in New York, sharing the ticket with the Jerry Garcia Band and Bo Diddley, a concert documented in the 1983 film Hell's Angels Forever. They opened for other major acts including Heart, the Nitty Gritty Dirt Band, Jimmy Buffett, The Allman Brothers Band, Ozark Mountain Daredevils, Bonnie Raitt, and the Charlie Daniels Band. While touring, they taped a significant number of performances on local and regional television programs from Miami to Seattle, promoting their concerts, which often sold out, and in 1979 they appeared on National Television on the show Hee Haw. Primarily a touring band rather than a studio group, at their peak they played 350 shows in a year.

The M2WB developed a reputation for their complex use of four-part vocal harmonies, the multi-instrumentality of their members, tight performances with "planned spontaneity," and extended concert jams, that were compared to those of the Grateful Dead. They played extensively on the college circuit, and were an annual mainstay of the Missoula Aber Day Kegger, a 1000-keg fundraiser for the University library, added to the Guinness Book of World Records as the world's largest benefit kegger. By 1977, Billboard Magazine noted that the band was viewed as "generally acclaimed to be the top regional band playing Montana," ranking it ahead of four other Pacific Northwest acts. Michael "Supe" Granda of the Ozark Mountain Daredevils stated, "If the Mission Mountain Wood Band... was the official band of the state, we were their close cousins." Analyzing their style, Granda said, "they were much better showmen than we were," but noted that the band's penchant for songs with a regional flavor limited their national recognition.

In 1977 the band released their first album In Without Knocking, and their cover of "Take a Whiff on Me" was the most popular song on the album at the time and became something of a party anthem. Their own composition, "Mountain Standard Time" is now better known, and "Sweet Maria" has proved to be the nostalgic favorite of the band members themselves. All three remain staples of their set list. Billboard Magazine reviewed the album, commenting that some songs were "a trifle old-fashioned, but that's part of the charm". Other reviews were generally favorable, but commented that the album failed to capture the charisma of the band's live performances. As an inside joke, the band assigned the album a fake catalogue number of "OU812," and put the number on their tour bus, doing so a decade before Van Halen released an album with that name.

=== Tour bus ===
The band traveled to 47 of the lower 48 states in a unique 1955 Greyhound Scenicruiser, identified as #472. Each member had his own private space on the bus, a factor they credited to the success of their intense touring period. Band legend is that they would have traveled to all of the lower 48 had it not been for a cancelled concert in Maine that was never rebooked. Quist has stated that they put about two million miles on the vehicle. The bus was sold in an estate sale following the Montana Band plane crash, and later obtained by a collector in Great Falls, Montana who refurbished it and states that, as of 2014, it still ran. The same could not be said of the bus during the band's touring years, when breakdowns and maintenance issues were frequent, possibly because of the Montana altitude, irregular driving habits of band personnel, or simply the mileage the bus accumulated.

=== The Montana Band ===
The Mission Mountain Wood Band broke up in 1981 and members Quist, Robinson, Reichenberg, and Kurt Bergeron (who had replaced Johnson), formed Montana, also known as The Montana Band. They added members Mark Wittman and Jerry Zalnoski, and headquartered in Reno, Nevada. In this formation, they played concerts at various colleges, nightclubs, fairs and rodeos as well as frequent performances in the Lake Tahoe area. The appeared on the ABC Cheryl Ladd Special and in other venues, recorded one album, Change in the Weather, in 1981, and were best known for the song, "Shoe's on the Other Foot Tonight," written by Quist. The single was listed as "recommended" by Billboard on October 31, 1981. The album was produced by Randy Bean and released by Waterhouse Records. In December 1981, Billboard Magazine listed it as a recommended LP, and said of the band, "They seem well-adapted to today's modern country sound." The band personnel remained in flux, with new musicians joining the band as others left. New musicians added to the band's lineup included Grady Whitfield of Utah, Alan Larson and Cliff Tipton, both from Oklahoma. Other albums included "Wake me When the sun Goes Down" (1984) and posthumous albums: "A Long Talk With Myself" (1987) and "'til The Next Time......." (1987).

Quist left The Montana Band in 1984, starting a solo career backed by his own band, Great Northern. The group won the country division of the Willie Nelson Music Invitational in 1986.

On July 4, 1987, remaining M2WB members Terry Robinson and Kurt Bergeron, along with band manager Tom Sawan, sound manager Dale Anderson, and then-current band members Cliff Tipton, Alan Larson, and Grady Whitfield, died when the twin-engine Beechcraft Model 18 they were flying in crashed near Lakeside, Montana. The pilot attempted to "buzz" the crowd following a concert where they had played and crashed into a hillside. Ten fatalities resulted from the crash, including the band members, Tipton's 12 year old son, the pilot, and another passenger. It was the worst private plane crash in Montana history at the time.

The crash was witnessed by a large number of people and widely reported. It was viewed as "the end of the innocence" for surviving band members and fans. Of their potential, those most familiar with the group said they had been "only a step away from the main showrooms and from the big-time with groups like Alabama and the Oak Ridge Boys".

== Reunion and 21st century music ==
In 1992 the four surviving members of the original M2WB lineup reunited for a concert in Polson, Montana, with Terry Robinson's brother Bruce Robinson filling in the fifth spot. Additional successful "reunion" concerts followed over the years, becoming more frequent as time passed, with Tim Ryan also filling the spot left by Terry Robinson. Band members also organized a 2012 tribute concert to the Montana band. M2WB now plays semi-regular performances, including some out-of-state in locations such as Lake Tahoe. In 2005 they released their entire recorded output in a box set entitled Private Stash, which included music, DVD recordings of performances, and cover art by Monte Dolack. The band was the subject of a 2009 PBS documentary, "Never Long Gone: The Mission Mountain Wood Band Story." That year, they also opened for John Fogerty at the Sturgis Motorcycle Rally. The band added singer and songwriter Tim Ryan to the group to fill the position once held by Robinson. They released a new studio album called Reboot in 2011 with a tour in support, and in 2014 a second new album, Now and Then. Though all members continue to play music, only Johnson, Ryan and Quist individually continue to work full time as musicians, Quist with Great Northern and later with his adult children Guthrie and Halladay in a band they called House of Quist and Johnson with the Christian Johnson Project On August 12, 2017 the band performed another reunion concert in Polson, a tribute to the now-defunct Aber Day Kegger.

== Discography ==
Title	Year	Label
In Without Knocking	1977	M_{2}WB Records
Change in the Weather (The Montana Band)	1981	Waterhouse Records
Wake Me When That Sun Goes Down (The Montana Band)	1984	Lake Song Records
Long Talk With Myself (The Montana Band)	1987	Moore Recording Corp.
'til The Next Time....... (The Montana Band)	1987	The Montana Band Dry Goods Co.
Private Stash	2005	M_{2}WB Records
Reboot	2011	M_{2}WB Records
Now and Then	2014	M_{2}WB Records

== See also ==
- Montana's at-large congressional district special election, 2017, Rob Quist standing as a candidate for Congress

== Sources ==
- Parrett, Aaron (2016). Montana Americana Music: Boot Stomping in Big Sky Country. Arcadia Publishing. ISBN 9781625857859.
