= White Sulphur Springs, Montana =

City in Montana, United States

White Sulphur Springs
- City
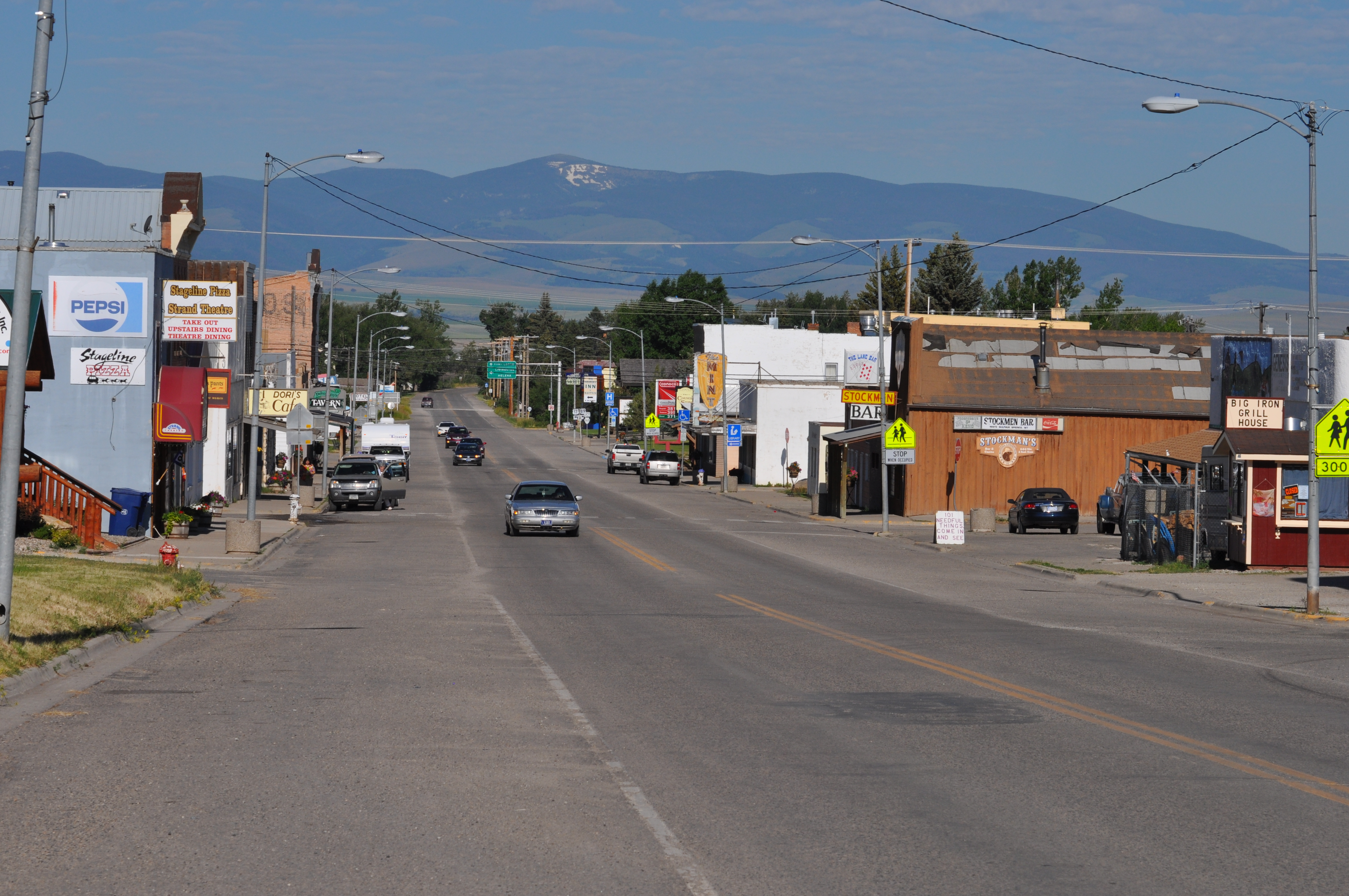
- Highway 12 looking west toward the Big Belt Mountains
- Nickname: Sulphurville
- Location in Meagher County and the state of Montana
- Coordinates: 46°32′43″N 110°54′14″W
- Country: United States
- State: Montana
- County: Meagher

Government
  - Mayor: Rick Nelson

Area
  - Total: 0.99 sq mi (2.57 km^{2})
  - Land: 0.99 sq mi (2.57 km^{2})
  - Water: 0 sq mi (0.00 km^{2})
- Elevation: 5,059 ft (1,542 m)

Population (2020)
  - Total: 955
  - Density: 964.2/sq mi (372.28/km^{2})
- Time zone: UTC−7 (Mountain (MST))
  - Summer (DST): UTC−6 (MDT)
- ZIP code: 59645
- Area code: 406
- FIPS code: 30-80050
- GNIS feature ID: 2412256
- Website: whitesulphurspringsmontana.com

White Sulphur Springs is a city in and the county seat of Meagher County, Montana, United States. The population was 955 at the 2020 census.

== History ==
White Sulphur Springs was originally called "Brewers Springs", after James Scott Brewer, who laid claim to the thermal springs in 1866. In 1876 the town name changed.

Due to the decline of Confederate Gulch and Diamond City, the newspaper Rocky Mountain Husbandsman was moved to White Sulphur Springs around 1876.

== Geography ==
White Sulphur Springs is in central Meagher County, along combined U.S. Routes 12 and 89, which pass through the city as Main Street and 3rd Avenue. US 12 leads east 57 miles (92 km) to Harlowton and southwest 42 miles (68 km) to Townsend, while US 89 leads north 40 miles (64 km) to Neihart and south 71 miles (114 km) to Livingston.

According to the U.S. Census Bureau, White Sulphur Springs has a total area of 0.99 square miles (2.56 km^{2}), all of it recorded as land. Hot Springs Creek rises in the center of town at a local hotel, which offers soaking in the mineralized hot springs. The North Fork Smith River crosses the northwest part of town. The Smith River is a north-flowing tributary of the Missouri.

The Castle Mountains are southeast of town. Newlan Creek Reservoir is 13 miles (21 km) by road to the north, at the foot of the Little Belt Mountains, and Lake Sutherlin is 10 miles (16 km) to the northeast along US 12. The lakes provide recreational water activities, including fishing for trout, burbot, and kokanee salmon.

White Sulphur is an anchor for the Kings Hill Scenic Byway, a 71-mile (114 km) drive which passes through the Little Belt Mountains in the Lewis and Clark National Forest.

=== Climate ===
Climate data for White Sulphur Springs, Montana, 1991–2020 normals, extremes 1894–present
Month	Jan	Feb	Mar	Apr	May	Jun	Jul	Aug	Sep	Oct	Nov	Dec	Year
Record high °F (°C)	60 (16)	78 (26)	85 (29)	89 (32)	96 (36)	98 (37)	103 (39)	100 (38)	96 (36)	87 (31)	70 (21)	63 (17)	103 (39)
Mean maximum °F (°C)	49.8 (9.9)	50.9 (10.5)	60.7 (15.9)	71.1 (21.7)	78.7 (25.9)	86.1 (30.1)	91.8 (33.2)	91.8 (33.2)	86.6 (30.3)	75.8 (24.3)	60.9 (16.1)	49.4 (9.7)	93.6 (34.2)
Mean daily maximum °F (°C)	33.4 (0.8)	34.6 (1.4)	44.6 (7.0)	52.9 (11.6)	62.7 (17.1)	71.3 (21.8)	81.6 (27.6)	81.4 (27.4)	70.6 (21.4)	56.3 (13.5)	41.7 (5.4)	32.6 (0.3)	55.3 (12.9)
Daily mean °F (°C)	23.4 (−4.8)	23.7 (−4.6)	32.7 (0.4)	39.7 (4.3)	48.7 (9.3)	56.7 (13.7)	64.8 (18.2)	64.0 (17.8)	54.7 (12.6)	42.8 (6.0)	31.1 (−0.5)	23.0 (−5.0)	42.1 (5.6)
Mean daily minimum °F (°C)	13.4 (−10.3)	12.9 (−10.6)	20.8 (−6.2)	26.6 (−3.0)	34.7 (1.5)	42.1 (5.6)	48.1 (8.9)	46.5 (8.1)	38.7 (3.7)	29.3 (−1.5)	20.4 (−6.4)	13.4 (−10.3)	28.9 (−1.7)
Mean minimum °F (°C)	−12.5 (−24.7)	−9.7 (−23.2)	1.2 (−17.1)	13.3 (−10.4)	23.7 (−4.6)	33.0 (0.6)	39.7 (4.3)	36.7 (2.6)	27.1 (−2.7)	11.2 (−11.6)	−1.2 (−18.4)	−9.4 (−23.0)	−22.3 (−30.2)
Record low °F (°C)	−42 (−41)	−43 (−42)	−33 (−36)	−7 (−22)	8 (−13)	22 (−6)	28 (−2)	23 (−5)	12 (−11)	−23 (−31)	−39 (−39)	−46 (−43)	−46 (−43)
Average precipitation inches (mm)	0.51 (13)	0.34 (8.6)	0.71 (18)	1.44 (37)	2.08 (53)	2.52 (64)	1.36 (35)	1.21 (31)	1.04 (26)	0.86 (22)	0.44 (11)	0.53 (13)	13.04 (331.6)
Average snowfall inches (cm)	7.9 (20)	6.6 (17)	10.1 (26)	3.9 (9.9)	1.1 (2.8)	0.0 (0.0)	0.0 (0.0)	0.0 (0.0)	1.2 (3.0)	3.4 (8.6)	4.4 (11)	7.5 (19)	46.1 (117.3)
Average extreme snow depth inches (cm)	5.4 (14)	4.1 (10)	4.8 (12)	2.6 (6.6)	0.4 (1.0)	0.0 (0.0)	0.0 (0.0)	0.0 (0.0)	0.6 (1.5)	1.5 (3.8)	3.6 (9.1)	5.0 (13)	8.3 (21)
Average precipitation days (≥ 0.01 in)	4.9	3.9	5.7	8.1	10.7	12.2	7.9	7.8	6.6	6.9	5.3	4.5	84.5
Average snowy days (≥ 0.1 in)	4.2	3.3	3.6	1.4	0.1	0.0	0.0	0.0	0.3	1.0	2.7	4.2	20.8
Source 1: NOAA
Source 2: National Weather Service (snow/snow days/snow depth 1981–2010)

== Demographics ==
Historical population
Census	Pop.	Note	%±
1910	417		—
1920	629		50.8%
1930	553		−12.1%
1940	818		47.9%
1950	929		13.6%
1960	898		−3.3%
1970	1,200		33.6%
1980	1,302		8.5%
1990	963		−26.0%
2000	984		2.2%
2010	939		−4.6%
2020	955		1.7%
U.S. Decennial Census

=== 2010 census ===
At the 2010 census there were 939 people in 433 households, including 255 families, in the city. The population density was 929.7 inhabitants per square mile (359.0/km^{2}). There were 563 housing units at an average density of 557.4 per square mile (215.2/km^{2}). The racial makeup of the city was 97.2% White, 0.1% African American, 0.3% Native American, 0.4% Asian, 0.2% from other races, and 1.7% from two or more races. Hispanic or Latino of any race were 1.4%.

Of the 433 households 22.2% had children under the age of 18 living with them, 49.4% were married couples living together, 7.9% had a female householder with no husband present, 1.6% had a male householder with no wife present, and 41.1% were non-families. 37.4% of households were one person and 19.6% were one person aged 65 or older. The average household size was 2.13 and the average family size was 2.75.

The median age was 51.2 years. 19% of residents were under the age of 18; 5.1% were between the ages of 18 and 24; 18% were from 25 to 44; 31.4% were from 45 to 64; and 26.3% were 65 or older. The gender makeup of the city was 49.8% male and 50.2% female.

=== 2000 census ===
At the 2000 census there were 984 people in 443 households, including 265 families, in the city. The population density was 1,069.1 inhabitants per square mile (412.8/km^{2}). There were 567 housing units at an average density of 616.0 per square mile (237.8/km^{2}). The racial makeup of the city was 96.24% White, 1.42% Native American, 0.20% Asian, 0.10% Pacific Islander, 0.51% from other races, and 1.52% from two or more races. Hispanic or Latino of any race were 1.93%.

Of the 443 households 25.3% had children under the age of 18 living with them, 48.1% were married couples living together, 8.4% had a female householder with no husband present, and 40.0% were non-families. 37.0% of households were one person and 17.8% were one person aged 65 or older. The average household size was 2.16 and the average family size was 2.84.

The age distribution was 22.4% under the age of 18, 6.9% from 18 to 24, 22.5% from 25 to 44, 26.9% from 45 to 64, and 21.3% 65 or older. The median age was 44 years. For every 100 females there were 94.9 males. For every 100 females age 18 and over, there were 92.9 males.

The median household income was $28,229 and the median family income was $34,342. Males had a median income of $23,403 versus $13,929 for females. The per capita income for the city was $13,836. About 11.6% of families and 13.3% of the population were below the poverty line, including 16.5% of those under age 18 and 11.0% of those age 65 or over.

== Arts and culture ==
The Castle Museum and Carriage House is a combination of a mansion tour and the Meagher County Museum. The Victorian style mansion has been decorated with period style artifacts. The carriage house was built in the 1990s to display a variety of carriages, sleds, a stagecoach, and other mementos.

The Charles M. Bair Family Museum, 35 miles (56 km) away, is the former home of Bair, one of the largest sheep ranchers in the United States in the early 1900s. The 11,000 sq ft home is filled with artifacts from the family. Additionally the museum covers 7,300 sq ft with art galleries and additional artifacts from the family's collections.

Meagher County City Library serves the area.

The Red Ants Pants Music Festival is held the last weekend in July. Internationally famous musicians have performed at the festival such as Merle Haggard, Lucinda Williams, and Brandi Carlile.

== Government ==
White Sulphur Springs has a mayor and city council. The mayor is Rick Nelson and his current term expires December 31, 2029.

== Education ==
White Sulphur Springs Schools educate students from kindergarten through 12th grade. White Sulphur Springs High School's team name is the Hornets.

== Media ==
The Meagher County News has provided local news weekly since 1934. The Meagher County Chronicle is an online news source for the area.

The public radio station KUMS is licensed in White Sulphur Springs.

== Infrastructure ==
U.S. Routes 89 and 12 enter through town in the east and exit through the south.

White Sulphur Springs Airport is a public use airport located 3 miles (5 km) south of town.

== Notable people ==
- Dirk Benedict, actor
- Sarah Calhoun, entrepreneur, founder of the women's workwear company Red Ants Pants
- Ivan Doig, novelist; born in White Sulphur Springs
- Emmanuel Taylor Gordon, Harlem Renaissance singer and performer; born, raised, and died in White Sulphur Springs

== See also ==
- National Register of Historic Places in Meagher County
