= 2026 United States Senate elections =

- November 3, 2026
- Class 2

35 (Note: 33 Class 2 seats, as well as 2 Class 3 seats being determined in special elections) of the 100 seats in the United States Senate 51 (Note: Majority control in an evenly divided Senate is determined by the Vice President of the United States, who has the power to break tied votes in their constitutional capacity as President of the Senate; accordingly, Senate control requires either 51 seats or 50 seats with control of the vice presidency.) seats needed for a majority
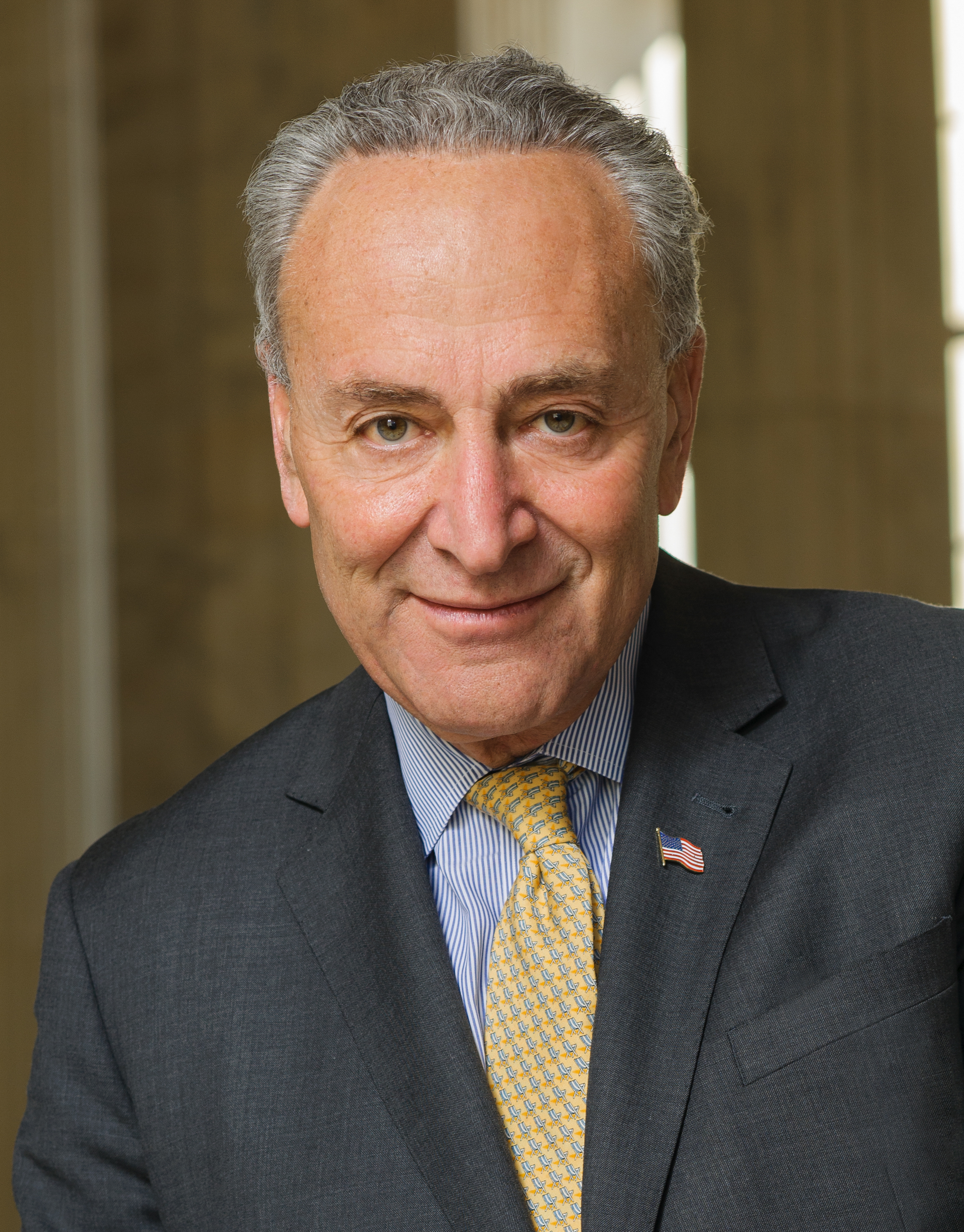

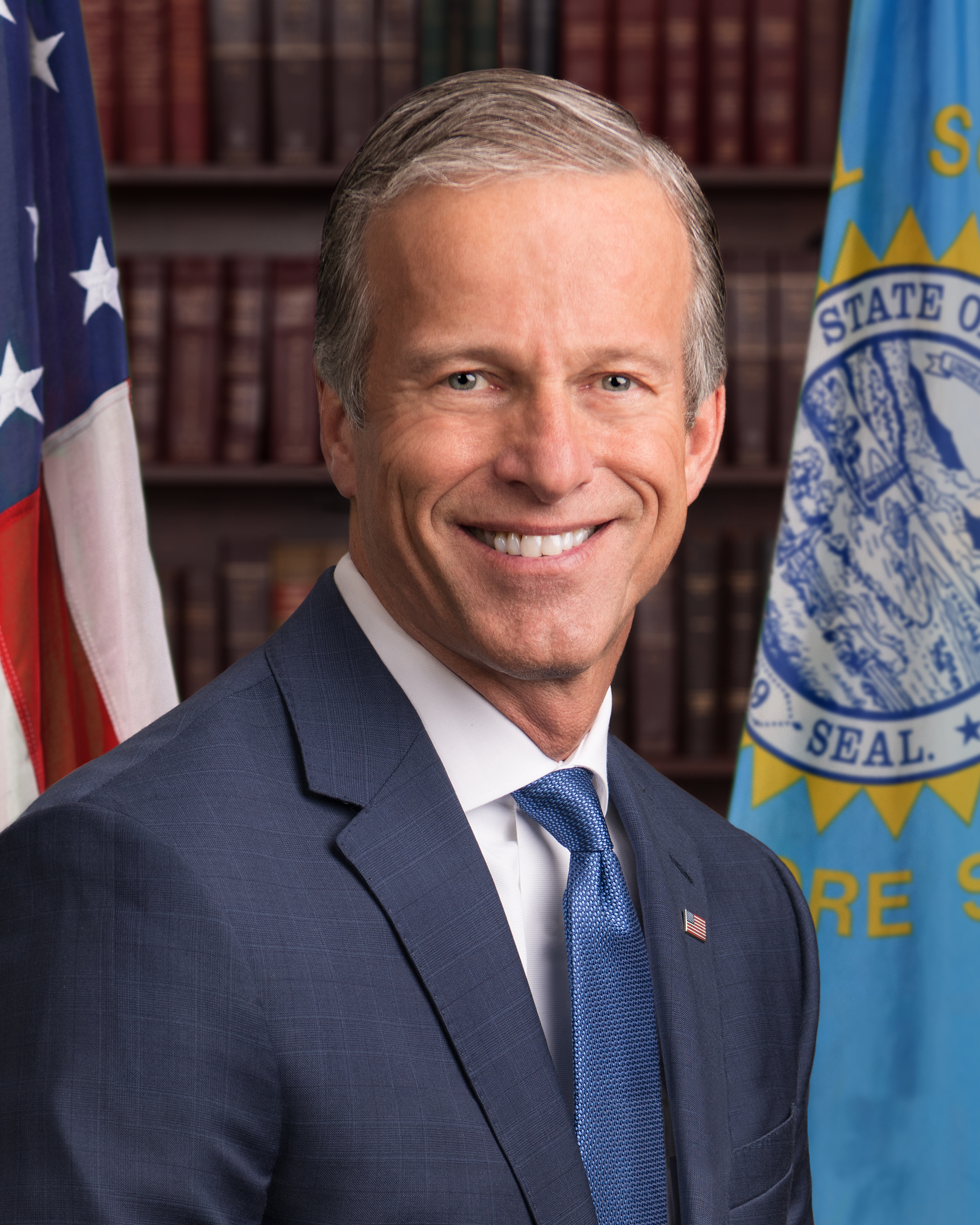
	Majority party	Minority party
Leader	Chuck Schumer	John Thune
Party	Democratic	Republican
Leader since	January 3, 2017	January 3, 2025
Leader's seat	New York	South Dakota
Seats before	45 (Note: Both independent senators—Bernie Sanders (VT) and Angus King (ME)—caucus with the Democratic Party.)	53
Seats after	54	44
Seat change	▲9	▼9
Popular vote	34,234,913	27,621,974
Percentage	53.39%	43.08%
Seats up	13	22
Races won	22	13
	Third party
Party	Independent
Seats before	2
Seats after	2
Seat change	Steady
Popular vote	1,136,615
Percentage	1.77%
Seats up	0
Races won	0
- Results of the elections: Democratic hold Democratic gain Republican hold No election
Majority Leader before election
John Thune
Republican
Elected Majority Leader
TBD
Democratic

Elections were held on November 3, 2026 to elect members of the United States Senate for the 120th Congress. Thirty-three Class 2 seats out of the 100 Senate seats were up for election, along with special elections in Florida and Ohio. The opposition Democratic Caucus defeated the Republican majority. The Democratic Caucus secured 56 seats—their largest post-election majority since the 2008 elections.

Senate seats are divided into three classes whose terms are staggered, so that a different class is elected every two years. Class 2 senators were last elected in 2020. Senators in this class were elected to six-year terms beginning in January 2027 and expiring in January 2033. With the election of John Thune as leader of the Republican Conference, these were the first races since the 2006 elections in which the Republicans were not led by Mitch McConnell. Schumer has led the Senate Democratic Caucus since 2017.

The Democrats won 22 out of 35 contested seats, while Republicans defended 13 seats and lost nine that they had held prior to the elections: Alaska, Iowa, Kansas, Maine, Mississippi, North Carolina, Ohio, South Carolina, and Texas. This was the largest number of seat flips for either party since 2014, and the largest for the Democrats since 1958. All of the flipped seats apart from Maine represent states won by Donald Trump in the preceding presidential election; among those eight, all but North Carolina were won by Trump by double-digit margins, representing the most states since 1986 to flip to the non-incumbent party after being won by the incumbent president by double digits in the preceding presidential election. Democrats also successfully defended seats in Georgia and Michigan, the two seats held by Democrats in states Trump won two years prior.

For the first time since the ratification of the 17th Amendment, a party won at least five seats in states that the opposing party won in the preceding ten presidential elections. Several of the most consequential elections were in Southern states—Mississippi, South Carolina, and Texas—where Democrats had not won a Senate election since 1982, 1998, and 1988, respectively.

Special elections were held concurrently in Ohio and Florida after JD Vance and Marco Rubio resigned to become vice president and secretary of state, respectively. Against Democratic challengers, Republicans suffered a defeat in Ohio and won narrowly in Florida. The appointed incumbents in the seats—Republicans Jon Husted and Ashley Moody—were running to complete their terms until after the 2028 elections.

Two incumbent senators—Bill Cassidy of Louisiana and John Cornyn of Texas—lost renomination in the primaries, while two nominees—Graham Platner (who dropped out) and Lindsey Graham (who died)—were replaced by a convention in Maine and a special primary in South Carolina, respectively. In three states—Idaho, Nebraska, and South Dakota—the Democratic nominee withdrew from the race, effectively clearing the field for an independent candidate.

== Partisan composition ==
35 of the Senate's seats were up for election, 22 of which were held by Republicans and 13 of which were held by Democrats. Only 9 of these were in states that neither party carried by a double-digit margin in the 2024 Presidential Election. These were Maine, New Mexico, New Jersey, Virginia, Minnesota, New Hampshire, Michigan, Georgia, and North Carolina. Democrats were the incumbents in all but Maine and North Carolina, which were seen as their likeliest pickup opportunities. Michigan and Georgia were seen as their main vulnerabilities, as recent federal statewide races there had all been decided by margins of less than three points.

Susan Collins in Maine and Jon Ossoff in Georgia were the only Senators running for re-election in states that did not vote for their party in 2024.

The 2026 Senate map was considered favorable to Republicans at the beginning of the year. Only two seats on each side were identified by most rating groups as highly competitive. Having 47 seats and needing at least four more, Democrats were not considered able to flip the Senate even in a best case scenario. Pollsters raised the party's chances to flip the Senate as the election approached due to highly competitive campaigns by its nominees in several states that were carried by republicans by double-digits in 2024, propelled by Trump's growing unpopularity.

== Summary results ==
=== Seats ===
Parties				Total
Parties	Democratic	Independent	Republican	Total
Last elections (2024)	45	2	53	100
Before these elections	45	2	53	100
Not up	32	2	31	65
Class 1 (2024→2030)	17	2	14	33
Class 3 (2022→2028)	15	—	17	32
Up for election in 2026	13	—	22	35
Class 2 (2020→2026)	13	—	20	33
Special: Class 3	—	—	2 (Note: Includes the interim appointees from Florida (Ashley Moody) and Ohio (Jon Husted) running for election.)	2
General election
Incumbent retiring	4	—	7	11
Held by same party	4	—	5	9
Replaced by other party	▼2 Republicans replaced by ▲2 Democrats			2
Result	6	—	5	11
Incumbent running	9	—	13 (Note: In Louisiana, Bill Cassidy lost renomination for another term in office, and Julia Letlow became the party's new nominee. In Texas, John Cornyn lost renomination for another term in office, and Ken Paxton became the party's new nominee.) (Note: Includes the interim appointee who is running for election.)	22
Won reelection	9	—	6	15
Lost reelection	▼5 Republicans replaced by ▲5 Democrats			5
Lost renomination but held by same party	—	—	1	1
Lost renomination and party lost	▼1 Republican replaced by ▲1 Democrat			1
Result	15	—	7	22
Special elections
Appointee running	—	—	2	2
Individuals elected	—	—	1	1
Lost election	▼1 Republican replaced by ▲1 Democrat			1
Result	1	—	1	2
Total Result	22	—	13	35
After these elections	54	2	44	100

== Change in composition ==
Each block represents one of the one hundred seats in the U.S. Senate. "D#" is a Democratic senator, "I#" is an Independent senator, and "R#" is a Republican senator. They are arranged so that the parties are separated and a majority is clear by crossing the middle.

=== Before the elections and the election results ===
Each block indicates an incumbent senator's actions going into the election.

D_{1}	D_{2}	D_{3}	D_{4}	D_{5}	D_{6}	D_{7}	D_{8}	D_{9}	D_{10}
D_{20}	D_{19}	D_{18}	D_{17}	D_{16}	D_{15}	D_{14}	D_{13}	D_{12}	D_{11}
D_{21}	D_{22}	D_{23}	D_{24}	D_{25}	D_{26}	D_{27}	D_{28}	D_{29}	D_{30}
D_{40} R.I. Ran	D_{39} Ore. Ran	D_{38} N.M. Ran	D_{37} N.J. Ran	D_{36} Mass. Ran	D_{35} Ga. Ran	D_{34} Del. Ran	D_{33} Colo. Ran	D_{32}	D_{31}
D_{41} Va. Ran	D_{42} Ill. Retiring	D_{43} Mich. Retiring	D_{44} Minn. Retiring	D_{45} N.H. Retiring	I_{1}	I_{2}	R_{53} Wyo. Retiring	R_{52} Okla. Retiring (Note: Markwayne Mullin won a special election in 2022 to fill Jim Inhofe's Oklahoma Senate seat after Inhofe resigned for health reasons. Mullin resigned on March 23, 2026, to become United States Secretary of Homeland Security. Oklahoma Governor Kevin Stitt appointed Alan Armstrong to the seat, and he was sworn in on March 24, 2026. Oklahoma law requires appointees to affirm they will not seek a full term; Armstrong will not run for election.)	R_{51} N.C. Retiring
Majority →									R_{50} Mont. Retiring
R_{41} Ohio (sp.); Ran	R_{46} S.C. Ran	R_{42} S.D. Ran	R_{43} Tenn. Ran	R_{44} Texas; Ran	R_{45} W.Va. Ran	R_{47} Ala. Retiring	R_{48} Iowa; Retiring	R_{49} Ky. Retiring	R_{50} Mont. Retiring
R_{40} Neb. Ran	R_{39} Miss. Ran	R_{38} Maine; Ran	R_{37} La. Ran	R_{36} Kan. Ran	R_{35} Idaho; Ran	R_{34} Fla. (sp.); Ran	R_{33} Ark. Ran	R_{32} Alaska; Ran	R_{31}
R_{21}	R_{22}	R_{23}	R_{24}	R_{25}	R_{26}	R_{27}	R_{28}	R_{29}	R_{30}
R_{20}	R_{19}	R_{18}	R_{17}	R_{16}	R_{15}	R_{14}	R_{13}	R_{12}	R_{11}
R_{1}	R_{2}	R_{3}	R_{4}	R_{5}	R_{6}	R_{7}	R_{8}	R_{9}	R_{10}

=== After the elections ===
D_{1}	D_{2}	D_{3}	D_{4}	D_{5}	D_{6}	D_{7}	D_{8}	D_{9}	D_{10}
D_{20}	D_{19}	D_{18}	D_{17}	D_{16}	D_{15}	D_{14}	D_{13}	D_{12}	D_{11}
D_{21}	D_{22}	D_{23}	D_{24}	D_{25}	D_{26}	D_{27}	D_{28}	D_{29}	D_{30}
D_{40} N.H. Hold	D_{39} Minn. Hold	D_{38} Mich. Hold	D_{37} Mass. Reelected	D_{36} Ill. Hold	D_{35} Ga. Reelected	D_{34} Del. Reelected	D_{33} Colo. Reelected	D_{32}	D_{31}
D_{41} N.J. Reelected	D_{42} N.M. Reelected	D_{43} Ore. Reelected	D_{44} R.I. Reelected	D_{45} Va. Reelected	D_{46} Alaska; Gain	D_{47} Iowa; Gain	D_{48} Kan. Gain	D_{49} Maine; Gain	D_{50} Miss. Gain
Majority →									D_{51} N.C. Gain
R_{41} S.D. Reelected	R_{42} Tenn. Reelected	R_{43} W.Va. Reelected	R_{44} Wyo. Hold	I_{2}	I_{1}	D_{54} Texas; Gain	D_{53} S.C. Gain (Note: Appointee defeated)	D_{52} Ohio (sp.); Gain	D_{51} N.C. Gain
R_{40} Okla. Hold	R_{39} Neb. Reelected	R_{38} Mont. Hold	R_{37} La. Hold	R_{36} Ky. Hold	R_{35} Idaho; Reelected	R_{34} Fla. (sp.); Elected (Note: Appointee elected)	R_{33} Ark. Reelected	R_{32} Ala. Hold	R_{31}
R_{21}	R_{22}	R_{23}	R_{24}	R_{25}	R_{26}	R_{27}	R_{28}	R_{29}	R_{30}
R_{20}	R_{19}	R_{18}	R_{17}	R_{16}	R_{15}	R_{14}	R_{13}	R_{12}	R_{11}
R_{1}	R_{2}	R_{3}	R_{4}	R_{5}	R_{6}	R_{7}	R_{8}	R_{9}	R_{10}

Key

D_{#}	Democratic
R_{#}	Republican
I_{#}	Independent, caucusing with Democrats

== Gains and holds ==
=== Retirements ===
Map of retirements: Republican incumbent ran Democratic incumbent ran Republican incumbent retired or lost renomination Democratic incumbent retired No election

Eleven senators—four Democrats and seven Republicans—announced they would not seek reelection. This is the most in a single election cycle since 1996, when thirteen senators chose not to run again. (Note: In the 2010 Senate elections, the Massachusetts special election was not included in the list and not part in the regular election cycle.)

State	Senator	Age at end of term	Assumed office	Replaced by	Ref
Alabama	Tommy Tuberville	72	2021	Barry Moore	
Illinois	Dick Durbin	82	1997	Juliana Stratton	
Iowa	Joni Ernst	56	2015	Josh Turek	
Kentucky	Mitch McConnell	84	1985	Andy Barr	
Michigan	Gary Peters	68	2015	Abdul El-Sayed	
Minnesota	Tina Smith	68	2018 (Note: Appointed to the seat following the resignation of Al Franken.)	Peggy Flanagan	
Montana	Steve Daines	64	2015	Kurt Alme	
New Hampshire	Jeanne Shaheen	79	2009	Chris Pappas	
North Carolina	Thom Tillis	66	2015	Roy Cooper	
Oklahoma	Alan Armstrong	64	2026 (Note: Appointed to the seat following the resignation of Markwayne Mullin.)	Kevin Hern	
Wyoming	Cynthia Lummis	72	2021	Harriet Hageman	

=== Defeats ===
Eight Republicans (including two appointees) sought either reelection or election (either to finish the term or a full six-year term), but lost either in the primary election or a special/general election. The last elected incumbent senator to lose renomination was Richard Lugar in 2012, (Note: Republican senator Luther Strange ran to complete the term he was appointed to in 2017, but lost the primary to Roy Moore, who narrowly lost the general election to Democratic nominee Doug Jones.) and the last time multiple elected incumbent senators lost renomination in primaries was in 2010. (Note: Two elected incumbent senators lost renomination in primaries in 2010: Lisa Murkowski in Alaska and Arlen Specter in Pennsylvania. After losing her primary, Murkowski ran a write-in campaign during the general election and won. In addition, Bob Bennett lost renomination at the state convention in Utah.) The last incumbent senator to place no better than third in a primary before Cassidy was Hattie Caraway in 1944. (Note: Republican senator Maurice J. Murphy Jr. ran to complete the term he was appointed to in 1962 but placed third in the primary.)

State	Senator	Age at end of term	Assumed office	Replaced by	Ref
Alaska	Dan Sullivan	62	2015	Mary Peltola	
Kansas	Roger Marshall	66	2021	Adam Hamilton	
Louisiana	Bill Cassidy	69	2015	Julia Letlow	
Maine	Susan Collins	74	1997	Troy Jackson	
Mississippi	Cindy Hyde-Smith	67	2018 (Note: Appointed to the seat following the resignation of Thad Cochran.)	Scott Colom	
Ohio (special)	Jon Husted	59	2025 (Note: Appointed to the seat following the resignation of JD Vance.)	Sherrod Brown	
South Carolina	Darline Graham	62	2026 (Note: Appointed to the seat following the death of Lindsey Graham.)	Annie Andrews	
Texas	John Cornyn	74	2002	James Talarico	

== Final pre-election predictions ==
Multiple sites and political pundits have published predictions of competitive seats. These predictions have considered factors such as the strength of the incumbent (if the incumbent was running for reelection) and the other candidates, and the state's partisan lean, reflected in part by the state's Cook Partisan Voting Index rating. The predictions typically assign ratings to each seat, indicating the predicted advantage that a party had in winning that seat. Most election predictors use:

- "tossup": no advantage
- "tilt" (used by some predictors): advantage that is not quite as strong as "lean"
- "lean": slight advantage
- "likely": significant, but surmountable, advantage
- "safe" or "solid": near-certain chance of victory

Constituency		Incumbent		Ratings												Result
State	PVI	Senator	Last election (Note: The last elections for this group of senators were in 2020, except for those elected in a special election or who were appointed after the resignation or death of a sitting senator, as noted.)	Cook Nov 2, 2026	DDHQ Nov 3, 2026	Econ Nov 3, 2026 (Note: This forecast uses the terms "Likely" and "Very Likely" the same way the other forecasts use the terms "Lean" and "Likely". To avoid confusion, and for the purposes of equivalency, the terms "Likely" and "Very Likely" will be changed to "Lean" and "Likely".)	FPO Nov 3, 2026	Fox Nov 1, 2026	IE Oct 29, 2026	MS NOW Oct 29, 2026	NBC Nov 3, 2026	RCP Nov 2, 2026	Sabato Nov 2, 2026	Silver Nov 3, 2026	ST Nov 2, 2026	Result
Alabama	R+15	Tommy Tuberville (retiring)	60.10% R	Solid R	Safe R	Safe R	Safe R	Solid R	Solid R	Safe R	Solid R	Solid R	Safe R	Solid R	Safe R	Moore (54.76%)
Alaska	R+6	Dan S. Sullivan	53.90% R	Tossup	Tossup	Tossup	Lean D (flip)	Tossup	Tossup	Tossup	Tossup	Tossup	Lean D (flip)	Tossup	Lean D (flip)	Peltola (50.12%) (flip)
Arkansas	R+15	Tom Cotton	66.53% R	Solid R	Safe R	Safe R	Safe R	Solid R	Solid R	Safe R	Solid R	Solid R	Safe R	Solid R	Safe R	Cotton (54.21%)
Colorado	D+6	John Hickenlooper	53.50% D	Solid D	Safe D	Safe D	Safe D	Solid D	Solid D	Safe D	Solid D	Solid D	Safe D	Solid D	Safe D	Hickenlooper (60.50%)
Delaware	D+8	Chris Coons	59.44% D	Solid D	Safe D	Safe D	Safe D	Solid D	Solid D	Safe D	Solid D	Solid D	Safe D	Solid D	Safe D	Coons (63.35%)
Florida (special)	R+5	Ashley Moody	Appointed (2025) (Note: Republican Marco Rubio won with 57.68% of the vote in 2022, but resigned on January 20, 2025, after being confirmed to become Secretary of State.)	Likely R	Likely R	Likely R	Likely R	Solid R	Likely R	Likely R	Likely R	Lean R	Likely R	Likely R	Likely R	Moody (50.86%)
Georgia	R+1	Jon Ossoff	50.62% D	Likely D	Likely D	Likely D	Safe D	Likely D	Likely D	Lean D	Likely D	Likely D	Likely D	Solid D	Safe D	Ossoff (59.02%)
Idaho	R+18	Jim Risch	62.62% R	Solid R	Safe R	Safe R	Safe R	Solid R	Solid R	Safe R	Solid R	Solid R	Safe R	Solid R	Safe R	Risch (56.50%)
Illinois	D+6	Dick Durbin (retiring)	54.93% D	Solid D	Safe D	Safe D	Safe D	Solid D	Solid D	Safe D	Solid D	Solid D	Safe D	Solid D	Safe D	Stratton (62.07%)
Iowa	R+6	Joni Ernst (retiring)	51.74% R	Tossup	Tossup	Lean R	Tossup	Tossup	Tossup	Lean R	Tossup	Tossup	Lean R	Tossup	Tossup	Turek (50.56%) (flip)
Kansas	R+8	Roger Marshall	53.22% R	Tossup	Tossup	Tossup	Lean D (flip)	Tossup	Tossup	Lean R	Tossup	Tossup	Lean D (flip)	Lean D (flip)	Lean D (flip)	Hamilton (51.18%) (flip)
Kentucky	R+15	Mitch McConnell (retiring)	57.76% R	Solid R	Likely R	Safe R	Safe R	Solid R	Solid R	Safe R	Solid R	Solid R	Safe R	Solid R	Safe R	Barr (55.00%)
Louisiana	R+11	Bill Cassidy (lost renomination)	59.32% R	Solid R	Likely R	Likely R	Likely R	Solid R	Likely R	Safe R	Solid R	Solid R	Lean R	Likely R	Likely R	Letlow (50.88%)
Maine	D+4	Susan Collins	50.98% R	Tossup	Lean D (flip)	Lean D (flip)	Likely D (flip)	Tossup	Tossup	Tossup	Lean D (flip)	Tossup	Lean D (flip)	Likely D (flip)	Lean D (flip)	Jackson (53.07%) (flip)
Massachusetts	D+14	Ed Markey	66.15% D	Solid D	Safe D	Safe D	Safe D	Solid D	Solid D	Safe D	Solid D	Solid D	Safe D	Solid D	Safe D	Markey (63.68%)
Michigan	EVEN	Gary Peters (retiring)	49.90% D	Lean D	Likely D	Lean D	Likely D	Tossup	Tilt D	Tossup	Lean D	Tossup	Lean D	Likely D	Likely D	El-Sayed (52.54%)
Minnesota	D+3	Tina Smith (retiring)	48.74% D	Lean D	Likely D	Lean D	Likely D	Lean D	Lean D	Lean D	Likely D	Lean D	Likely D	Likely D	Likely D	Flanagan (53.71%)
Mississippi	R+11	Cindy Hyde-Smith	54.11% R	Likely R	Likely R	Likely R	Safe R	Likely R	Likely R	Likely R	Likely R	Likely R	Likely R	Solid R	Likely R	Colom (49.36%) (flip)
Montana	R+10	Steve Daines (retiring)	55.01% R	Solid R	Likely R	Likely R	Likely R	Solid R	Solid R	Safe R	Likely R	Likely R	Safe R	Likely R	Safe R	Alme (48.16%)
Nebraska	R+10	Pete Ricketts	62.58% R (2024 sp.) (Note: Republican Ben Sasse won with 62.74% of the vote in 2020, but resigned on January 8, 2023, to be president of the University of Florida.)	Lean R	Lean R	Likely R	Likely R	Lean R	Tilt R	Likely R	Lean R	Tossup	Lean R	Lean R	Lean R	Ricketts (49.85%)
New Hampshire	D+2	Jeanne Shaheen (retiring)	56.64% D	Lean D	Likely D	Likely D	Likely D	Lean D	Tilt D	Lean D	Lean D	Lean D	Likely D	Solid D	Safe D	Pappas (55.93%)
New Jersey	D+4	Cory Booker	57.23% D	Solid D	Safe D	Safe D	Safe D	Solid D	Solid D	Safe D	Solid D	Solid D	Safe D	Solid D	Safe D	Booker (62.64%)
New Mexico	D+4	Ben Ray Luján	51.73% D	Solid D	Safe D	Safe D	Safe D	Solid D	Solid D	Safe D	Solid D	Likely D	Safe D	Solid D	Safe D	Ray Luján (63.26%)
North Carolina	R+1	Thom Tillis (retiring)	48.69% R	Likely D (flip)	Likely D (flip)	Likely D (flip)	Safe D (flip)	Likely D (flip)	Lean D (flip)	Lean D (flip)	Likely D (flip)	Likely D (flip)	Likely D (flip)	Solid D (flip)	Safe D (flip)	Cooper (58.75%) (flip)
Ohio (special)	R+5	Jon Husted	Appointed (2025) (Note: Republican JD Vance won with 53.03% of the vote in 2022, but resigned on January 10, 2025, to become Vice President of the United States.)	Tossup	Tossup	Tossup	Lean D (flip)	Lean D (flip)	Tilt D (flip)	Tossup	Tossup	Tossup	Lean D (flip)	Lean D (flip)	Lean D (flip)	Brown (50.09%) (flip)
Oklahoma	R+17	Alan Armstrong (retiring)	Appointed (2026) (Note: Republican Jim Inhofe won with 62.91% of the vote in 2020, but resigned at the end of the 117th United States Congress. In 2022, Markwayne Mullin won with 61.77% of the vote. He resigned in 2026 after being sworn in as Secretary of the United States Department of Homeland Security.)	Solid R	Safe R	Safe R	Safe R	Solid R	Solid R	Safe R	Solid R	Solid R	Safe R	Solid R	Safe R	Hern (57.20%)
Oregon	D+8	Jeff Merkley	56.91% D	Solid D	Safe D	Safe D	Safe D	Solid D	Solid D	Safe D	Solid D	Solid D	Safe D	Solid D	Safe D	Merkley (58.00%)
Rhode Island	D+8	Jack Reed	66.48% D	Solid D	Safe D	Safe D	Safe D	Solid D	Solid D	Safe D	Solid D	Solid D	Safe D	Solid D	Safe D	Reed (66.78%)
South Carolina	R+8	Darline Graham	Appointed (2026) (Note: Republican Lindsey Graham won with 54.44% of the vote in 2020, but died in office on July 11, 2026.)	Lean R	Tossup	Lean R	Lean R	Tossup	Tilt R	Lean R	Lean R	Tossup	Lean R	Lean R	Lean R	Andrews (51.14%) (flip)
South Dakota	R+15	Mike Rounds	65.74% R	Solid R	Safe R	Safe R	Safe R	Solid R	Solid R	Safe R	Solid R	Solid R	Safe R	Solid R	Likely R	Rounds (60.50%)
Tennessee	R+14	Bill Hagerty	62.20% R	Solid R	Safe R	Safe R	Safe R	Solid R	Solid R	Safe R	Solid R	Solid R	Safe R	Solid R	Safe R	Hagerty (55.07%)
Texas	R+6	John Cornyn (lost renomination)	53.51% R	Tossup	Tossup	Tossup	Lean D (flip)	Tossup	Tilt D (flip)	Tossup	Tossup	Tossup	Lean D (flip)	Likely D (flip)	Likely D (flip)	Talarico (55.09%) (flip)
Virginia	D+3	Mark Warner	55.99% D	Solid D	Safe D	Safe D	Safe D	Solid D	Solid D	Safe D	Solid D	Solid D	Safe D	Solid D	Safe D	Warner (61.47%)
West Virginia	R+21	Shelley Moore Capito	70.28% R	Solid R	Safe R	Safe R	Safe R	Solid R	Solid R	Safe R	Solid R	Solid R	Safe R	Solid R	Safe R	Capito (58.30%)
Wyoming	R+23	Cynthia Lummis (retiring)	72.85% R	Solid R	Safe R	Safe R	Safe R	Solid R	Solid R	Safe R	Solid R	Solid R	Safe R	Solid R	Safe R	Hageman (64.88%)
Overall (Note: Democratic total includes Independents who caucus with the Democrats.)				D/I - 48; R - 46; 6 tossups	D/I - 49; R - 45; 6 tossups	D/I - 49; R - 47; 4 tossups	D/I - 53; R - 46; 1 tossup	D/I - 48; R - 45; 7 tossups	D/I - 50; R - 46; 4 tossups	D/I - 48; R - 47; 5 tossups	D/I - 49; R - 46; 5 tossups	D/I - 47; R - 44; 9 tossups	D/I - 53; R - 47	D/I - 52; R - 46; 2 tossups	D/I - 53; R - 46; 1 tossup	D/I - 56; R - 44

== Generic congressional ballot aggregate polls ==
Source of poll aggregation	Dates administered	Dates updated	Republicans	Democrats	Other/ Undecided (Note: Calculated by taking the difference of 100% and all other candidates combined)	Margin
Decision Desk HQ	January 9, 2025 – November 1, 2026	November 3, 2026	42.8%	51.4%	5.8%	Democrats +8.6%
FiftyPlusOne	January 9, 2025 – November 1, 2026	November 3, 2026	44.1%	52.8%	3.1%	Democrats +8.6%
NBC News	January 9, 2025 – November 1, 2026	November 3, 2026	44.0%	52.0%	4.0%	Democrats +8.0%
RealClearPolitics	October 9 – November 1, 2026	November 3, 2026	43.3%	52.1%	4.6%	Democrats +8.8%
Silver Bulletin	January 9, 2025 – November 1, 2026	November 3, 2026	43.0%	51.8%	5.2%	Democrats +8.8%
Average		November 3, 2026	43.4%	52.0%	4.6%	Democrats +8.6%

== Closest races ==
12 races had a margin of victory under 10%:

State	Party of winner	Margin
Mississippi	Democratic (flip)	0.83%
Louisiana	Republican	1.77%
Florida (special)	Republican	2.85%
Iowa	Democratic (flip)	4.20%
Alaska	Democratic (flip)	4.33%
South Carolina	Democratic (flip)	4.50%
Ohio (special)	Democratic (flip)	5.02%
Kansas	Democratic (flip)	5.39% (Note: Kansas was the "tipping point" state.)
Nebraska	Republican	5.69%
Maine	Democratic (flip)	6.20%
Michigan	Democratic	7.08%
Alabama	Republican	9.42%

== Race summary ==
=== Special elections during the preceding Congress ===
Special U.S. Senate elections in Florida and Ohio were scheduled for November 3, 2026. Florida voters reelected DeSantis appointee Ashley Moody to serve the remaining two years of former Senator Marco Rubio's unexpired term; Rubio resigned his seat in 2025 to become United States Secretary of State. Ohio voters elected former Senator Sherrod Brown to serve the remaining two years of former Senator JD Vance's unexpired term; Vance resigned in 2025 to become Vice President of the United States.

Elections are sorted by date then state.

State	Incumbent			Status	Candidates
State	Senator	Party	Electoral history	Status	Candidates
Florida (Class 3)	Ashley Moody	Republican	2025 (appointed)	Interim appointee elected.	▌ ✓ Ashley Moody (Republican) 50.9%; ▌Angie Nixon (Democratic) 48.0%; ▌Neil Gillespie (Independent) 1.1%
Ohio (Class 3)	Jon Husted	Republican	2025 (appointed)	Interim appointee lost election. Democratic gain.	▌ ✓ Sherrod Brown (Democratic) 50.0%; ▌Jon Husted (Republican) 45.2%; Others: ▌William Redpath (Libertarian) 2.8%; ▌Greg Levy (Independent) 2.1%

=== Elections leading to the next Congress ===
In these general elections, the winners will be elected for the term beginning January 3, 2027.

State	Incumbent			Results	Candidates
State	Senator	Party	Electoral history	Results	Candidates
Alabama	Tommy Tuberville	Republican	2020	Incumbent retired to run for governor. Republican hold.	▌ ✓ Barry Moore (Republican) 54.7%; ▌Everett Wess (Democratic) 45.3%
Alaska	Dan Sullivan	Republican	2014; 2020	Incumbent lost reelection. Democratic gain.	▌ ✓ Mary Peltola (Democratic) 50.1%; ▌Dan S. Sullivan (Republican) 45.8%; ▌Gerald Heikes (Republican) 2.1%; ▌Dan J. Sullivan (Republican) 1.7%
Arkansas	Tom Cotton	Republican	2014; 2020	Incumbent reelected.	▌ ✓ Tom Cotton (Republican) 54.3%; ▌Hallie Shoffner (Democratic) 42.4%; ▌Jeff Wadlin (Libertarian) 3.3%
Colorado	John Hickenlooper	Democratic	2020	Incumbent reelected.	▌ ✓ John Hickenlooper (Democratic) 60.5%; ▌Mark Baisley (Republican) 35.0%; Others: ▌Bob Chew (Forward) 2.6%; ▌Blake Huber (Libertarian) 1.2%; ▌Adam Withrow (Unity) 0.5%; ▌Christopher Baum (Approval Voting) 0.2%
Delaware	Chris Coons	Democratic	2010 (special); 2014; 2020	Incumbent reelected.	▌ ✓ Chris Coons (Democratic) 63.4%; ▌Michael Katz (Republican) 36.3%
Georgia	Jon Ossoff	Democratic	2021	Incumbent reelected.	▌ ✓ Jon Ossoff (Democratic) 59.0%; ▌Mike Collins (Republican) 41.0%
Idaho	Jim Risch	Republican	2008; 2014; 2020	Incumbent reelected.	▌ ✓ Jim Risch (Republican) 56.5%; ▌Todd Achilles (Independent) 33.6%; ▌Natalie Fleming (Independent) 7.0%; ▌Matt Loesby (Libertarian) 2.9%
Illinois	Dick Durbin	Democratic	1996; 2002; 2008; 2014; 2020	Incumbent retired. Democratic hold.	▌ ✓ Juliana Stratton (Democratic) 62.0%; ▌Don Tracy (Republican) 36.4%; ▌Whitfield Harrington Jr. (Independent) 1.6%
Iowa	Joni Ernst	Republican	2014; 2020	Incumbent retired. Democratic gain.	▌ ✓ Josh Turek (Democratic) 50.6%; ▌Ashley Hinson (Republican) 46.4%; ▌Thomas Laehn (Libertarian) 3.1%
Kansas	Roger Marshall	Republican	2020	Incumbent lost reelection. Democratic gain.	▌ ✓ Adam Hamilton (Democratic) 51.2%; ▌Roger Marshall (Republican) 45.8%; ▌David Graham (Libertarian) 3.0%
Kentucky	Mitch McConnell	Republican	1984; 1990; 1996; 2002; 2008; 2014; 2020	Incumbent retired. Republican hold.	▌ ✓ Andy Barr (Republican) 55.0%; ▌Charles Booker (Democratic) 42.9%; ▌Christopher Campbell (Independent) 2.1%
Louisiana	Bill Cassidy	Republican	2014; 2020	Incumbent lost renomination. Republican hold.	▌ ✓ Julia Letlow (Republican) 50.9%; ▌Jamie Davis (Democratic) 49.1%
Maine	Susan Collins	Republican	1996; 2002; 2008; 2014; 2020	Incumbent lost reelection. Democratic gain.	▌ ✓ Troy Jackson (Democratic) 53.1%; ▌Susan Collins (Republican) 46.9%
Massachusetts	Ed Markey	Democratic	2013 (special); 2014; 2020	Incumbent reelected.	▌ ✓ Ed Markey (Democratic) 63.4%; ▌John Deaton (Republican) 32.1%; Others: ▌Shiva Ayyadurai (Independent) 2.3%; ▌Joe Tache (PSL) 2.2%
Michigan	Gary Peters	Democratic	2014; 2020	Incumbent retired. Democratic hold.	▌ ✓ Abdul El-Sayed (Democratic) 52.5%; ▌Mike Rogers (Republican) 45.5%; Others: ▌Lydia Christensen (Libertarian) 1.0%; ▌Tim Long (U.S. Taxpayers) 0.6%; ▌Douglas P. Marsh (Green) 0.3%; ▌Walter P. Kristy (Natural Law) 0.2%
Minnesota	Tina Smith	DFL	2018 (appointed); 2018 (special); 2020	Incumbent retired. DFL hold.	▌ ✓ Peggy Flanagan (DFL) 53.7%; ▌Michele Tafoya (Republican) 43.6%; Others: ▌Marisa Simonetti (Independent) 1.5%; ▌Rebecca Whiting (Libertarian) 1.1%
Mississippi	Cindy Hyde-Smith	Republican	2018 (appointed); 2018 (special); 2020	Incumbent lost reelection. Democratic gain.	▌ ✓ Scott Colom (Democratic) 49.3%; ▌Cindy Hyde-Smith (Republican) 48.6%; ▌Ty Pinkins (Independent) 2.1%
Montana	Steve Daines	Republican	2014; 2020	Incumbent retired. Republican hold.	▌ ✓ Kurt Alme (Republican) 48.2%; ▌Seth Bodnar (Independent) 37.7%; ▌Alani Bankhead (Democratic) 12.3%; ▌Kyle Austin (Libertarian) 1.8%
Nebraska	Pete Ricketts	Republican	2023 (appointed); 2024 (special)	Incumbent reelected.	▌ ✓ Pete Ricketts (Republican) 50.0%; ▌Dan Osborn (Independent) 44.1%; Others: ▌Robin Richards (Working People) 2.6%; ▌Mike Marvin (Legal Marijuana Now) 2.2%; ▌Chuck Conboy (America First) 1.2%
New Hampshire	Jeanne Shaheen	Democratic	2008; 2014; 2020	Incumbent retired. Democratic hold.	▌ ✓ Chris Pappas (Democratic) 55.9%; ▌John E. Sununu (Republican) 42.2%; ▌Edmond LaPlante (Constitution) 1.9%
New Jersey	Cory Booker	Democratic	2013 (special); 2014; 2020	Incumbent reelected.	▌ ✓ Cory Booker (Democratic) 62.5%; ▌Justin Murphy (Republican) 34.9%; Others: ▌Veronica Fernandez (Independent) 1.7%; ▌Joanne Kuniansky (Socialist Workers) 0.9%
New Mexico	Ben Ray Luján	Democratic	2020	Incumbent reelected.	▌ ✓ Ben Ray Luján (Democratic) 63.3%; ▌Larry Marker (Republican) 36.7%
North Carolina	Thom Tillis	Republican	2014; 2020	Incumbent retired. Democratic gain.	▌ ✓ Roy Cooper (Democratic) 58.8%; ▌Michael Whatley (Republican) 39.1%; Others: ▌Shannon Bray (Libertarian) 1.3%; ▌Michael Dublin (Green) 0.9%
Oklahoma	Alan Armstrong	Republican	2026 (appointed)	Interim appointee ineligible to run. Republican hold.	▌ ✓ Kevin Hern (Republican) 57.2%; ▌N'Kiyla Jasmine Thomas (Democratic) 39.3%; Others: ▌Curtis Stinnett (Independent) 1.3%; ▌Ron Meinhardt (Independent) 1.3%; ▌Sevier White (Libertarian) 0.9%
Oregon	Jeff Merkley	Democratic	2008; 2014; 2020	Incumbent reelected.	▌ ✓ Jeff Merkley (Democratic) 58.0%; ▌David Brock Smith (Republican) 38.7%; Others: ▌Chris Henry (Progressive) 2.2%; ▌Gary Lyndon Dye (Libertarian) 1.0%
Rhode Island	Jack Reed	Democratic	1996; 2002; 2008; 2014; 2020	Incumbent reelected.	▌ ✓ Jack Reed (Democratic) 66.8%; ▌Raymond McKay (Republican) 29.3%; ▌Michael Bahry (Independent) 3.8%
South Carolina	Darline Graham (Note: Republican incumbent Lindsey Graham was renominated, but died on July 11, 2026.)	Republican	2026 (appointed)	Interim appointee lost election. Democratic gain.	▌ ✓ Annie Andrews (Democratic) 51.1%; ▌Darline Graham (Republican) 46.6%; Others: ▌Kasie Whitener (Libertarian) 1.2%; ▌Mark Hackett (Constitution) 0.8%
South Dakota	Mike Rounds	Republican	2014; 2020	Incumbent reelected.	▌ ✓ Mike Rounds (Republican) 60.5%; ▌Brian Bengs (Independent) 39.5%
Tennessee	Bill Hagerty	Republican	2020	Incumbent reelected.	▌ ✓ Bill Hagerty (Republican) 55.1%; ▌Marquita Bradshaw (Democratic) 42.9%; Others: ▌Robert Jones (Independent) 0.5%; ▌Tharon Chandler (Independent) 0.4%; ▌Andrew Gerena (Independent) 0.3%; ▌Catherine Whitson (Independent) 0.2%; ▌Jeremy Hearn (Independent) 0.2%; ▌David Sutman Jr. (Independent) 0.1%; ▌Yoshi Matthews (Independent) 0.1%; ▌James Macon III (Independent) 0.1%
Texas	John Cornyn	Republican	2002; 2008; 2014; 2020	Incumbent lost renomination in runoff. Democratic gain.	▌ ✓ James Talarico (Democratic) 55.1%; ▌Ken Paxton (Republican) 43.0%; ▌Ted Brown (Libertarian) 1.9%
Virginia	Mark Warner	Democratic	2008; 2014; 2020	Incumbent reelected.	▌ ✓ Mark Warner (Democratic) 61.5%; ▌Bert Mizusawa (Republican) 38.3%
West Virginia	Shelley Moore Capito	Republican	2014; 2020	Incumbent reelected.	▌ ✓ Shelley Moore Capito (Republican) 58.3%; ▌Rachel Fetty Anderson (Democratic) 37.9%; ▌S. Marshall Wilson (Constitution) 3.8%
Wyoming	Cynthia Lummis	Republican	2020	Incumbent retired. Republican hold.	▌ ✓ Harriet Hageman (Republican) 64.9%; ▌James W. Byrd (Democratic) 34.6%

== Alabama ==
Alabama election
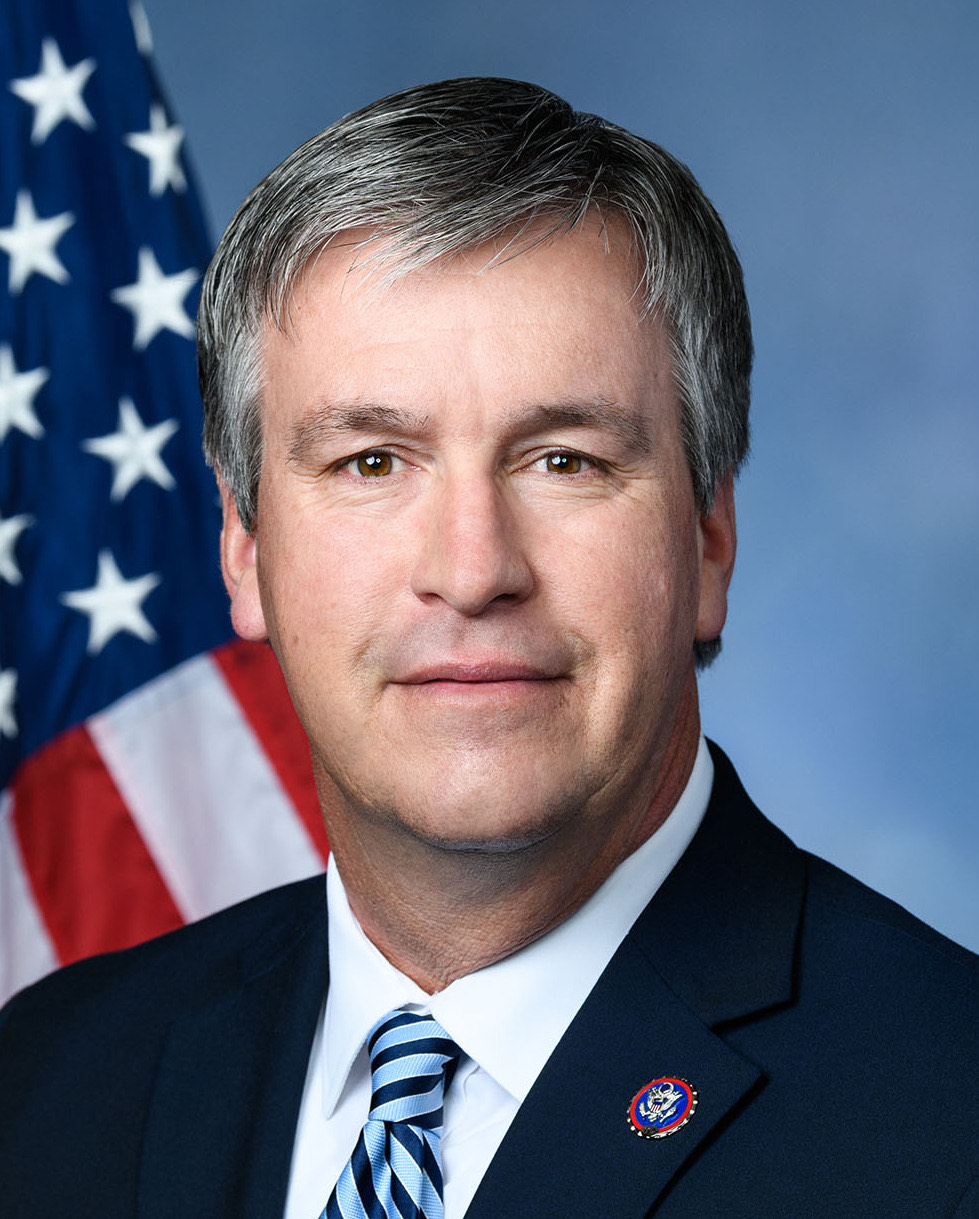

Nominee	Barry Moore	Everett Wess
Party	Republican	Democratic
Popular vote	917,347	759,336
Percentage	54.7%	45.3%
- Moore: 50–60% 60–70% 70–80% 80–90% Wess: 40–50% 50–60% 60–70% 70–80% 80–90%
U.S. senator before election
Tommy Tuberville
Republican
Elected U.S. Senator
Barry Moore
Republican

Republican Tommy Tuberville, who was elected in 2020 with 60.1% of the vote, initially planned to seek reelection, but on May 27, 2025, he announced that he would instead run for governor of Alabama.

Held on May 19, the Republican primary featured U.S. Representative Barry Moore, former Navy SEAL Jared Hudson, and state attorney general Steve Marshall. Since no candidate reached 50%, a runoff was held on June 16 between the top two finishers. Moore won the runoff, becoming the Republican nominee.

In the Democratic primary, no candidate received 50%, so a runoff was held between businessman Dakarai Larriet and attorney Everett Wess. Wess won the runoff with 54.6% of the vote.

Moore defeated Wess in the general election on November 3.

== Alaska ==
Alaska election
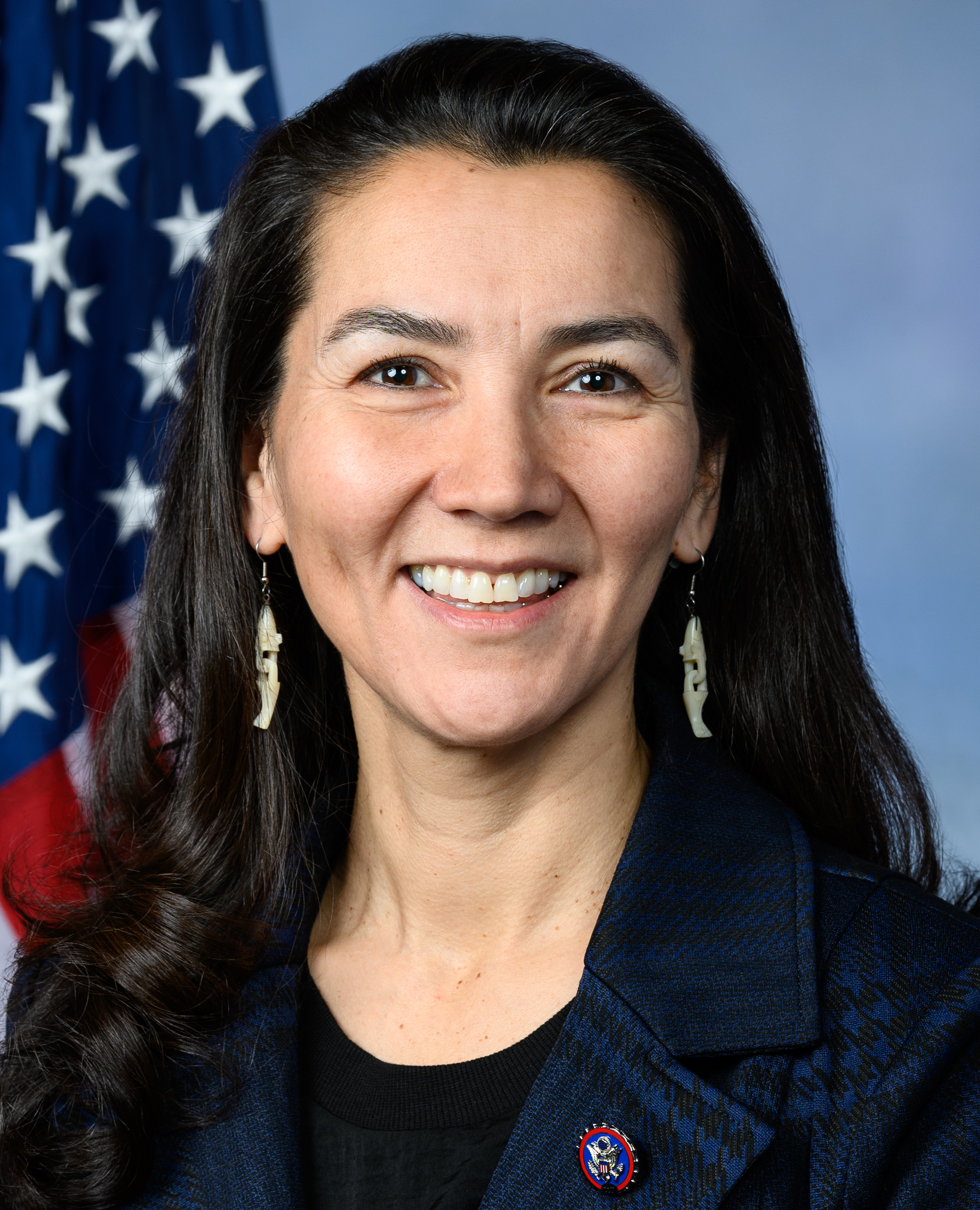

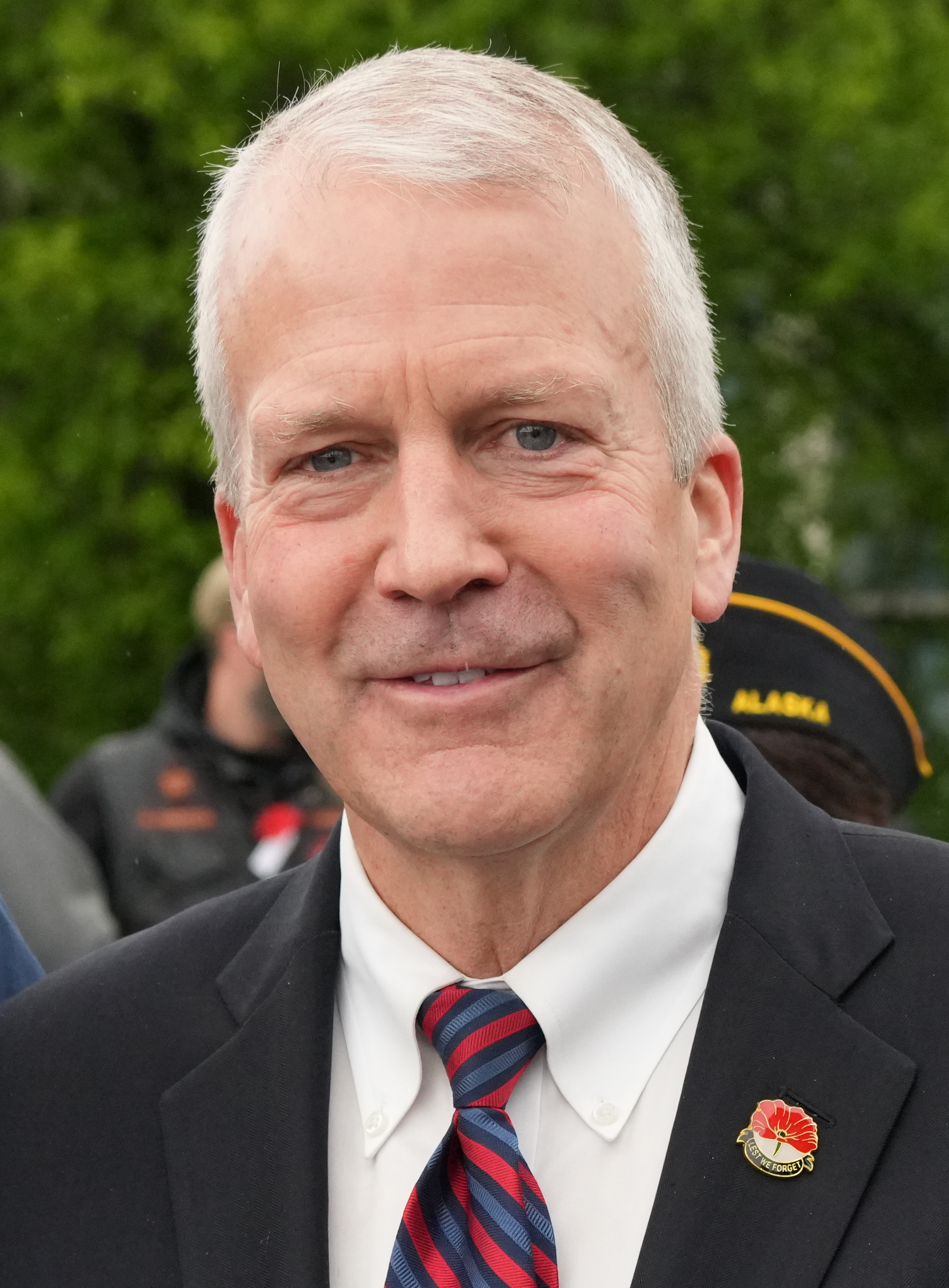
Candidate	Mary Peltola	Dan S. Sullivan
Party	Democratic	Republican
Popular vote	144,302	131,844
Percentage	50.12%	45.80%
- Results by House District; Peltola: 40–50% 50–60% 60–70% 70–80% Sullivan: 40–50% 50–60% 60–70% 70–80%
U.S. senator before election
Dan S. Sullivan
Republican
Elected U.S. Senator
Mary Peltola
Democratic

Two-term Republican Dan S. Sullivan was reelected in 2020 with 53.9% of the vote. He ran for reelection to a third term.

A nonpartisan primary was held on August 18, 2026, with the top four candidates advancing to the general election, which was conducted using ranked-choice voting. The advancing candidates were the incumbent, Dan S. Sullivan; perennial Republican candidate Gerald Heikes; former Democratic U.S. representative Mary Peltola; and former U.S. Forest Service employee Dan J. Sullivan, despite efforts to disqualify him. Some Republicans alleged that Dan J. Sullivan's candidacy was intended to confuse voters seeking to support the incumbent senator, who shares his first and last names.

Peltola defeated Sullivan in the general election on November 3, flipping the seat from Republican to Democratic.

== Arkansas ==
Arkansas election
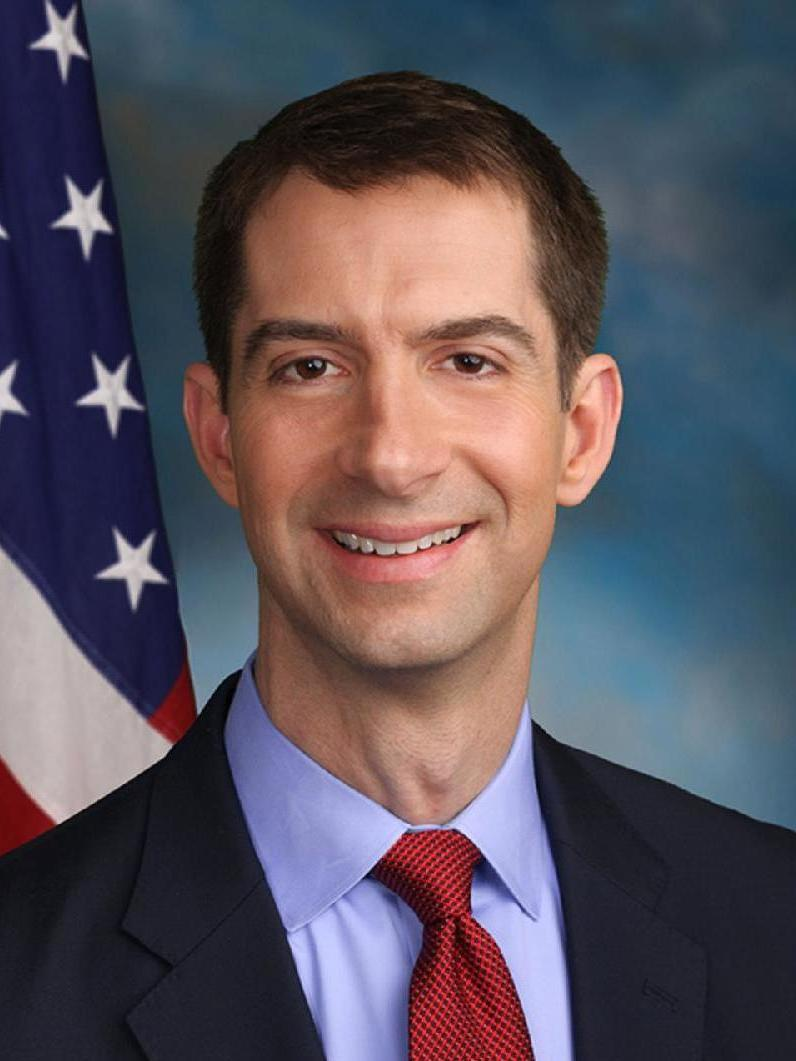

Nominee	Tom Cotton	Hallie Shoffner
Party	Republican	Democratic
Popular vote	481,495	377,108
Percentage	54.2%	42.5%
- Cotton: 40–50% 50–60% 60–70% 70–80% Shoffner: 40–50% 50–60% 60–70%
U.S. senator before election
Tom Cotton
Republican
Elected U.S. Senator
Tom Cotton
Republican

Two-term Republican Tom Cotton was reelected in 2020 with 66.5% of the vote. Cotton ran for reelection, having secured the Republican nomination on March 3, 2026.

Rice farmer Hallie Shoffner defeated Ethan Dunbar in the March 3 Democratic primary.

Cotton was reelected, defeating Shoffner in the general election on November 3.

== Colorado ==
Colorado election
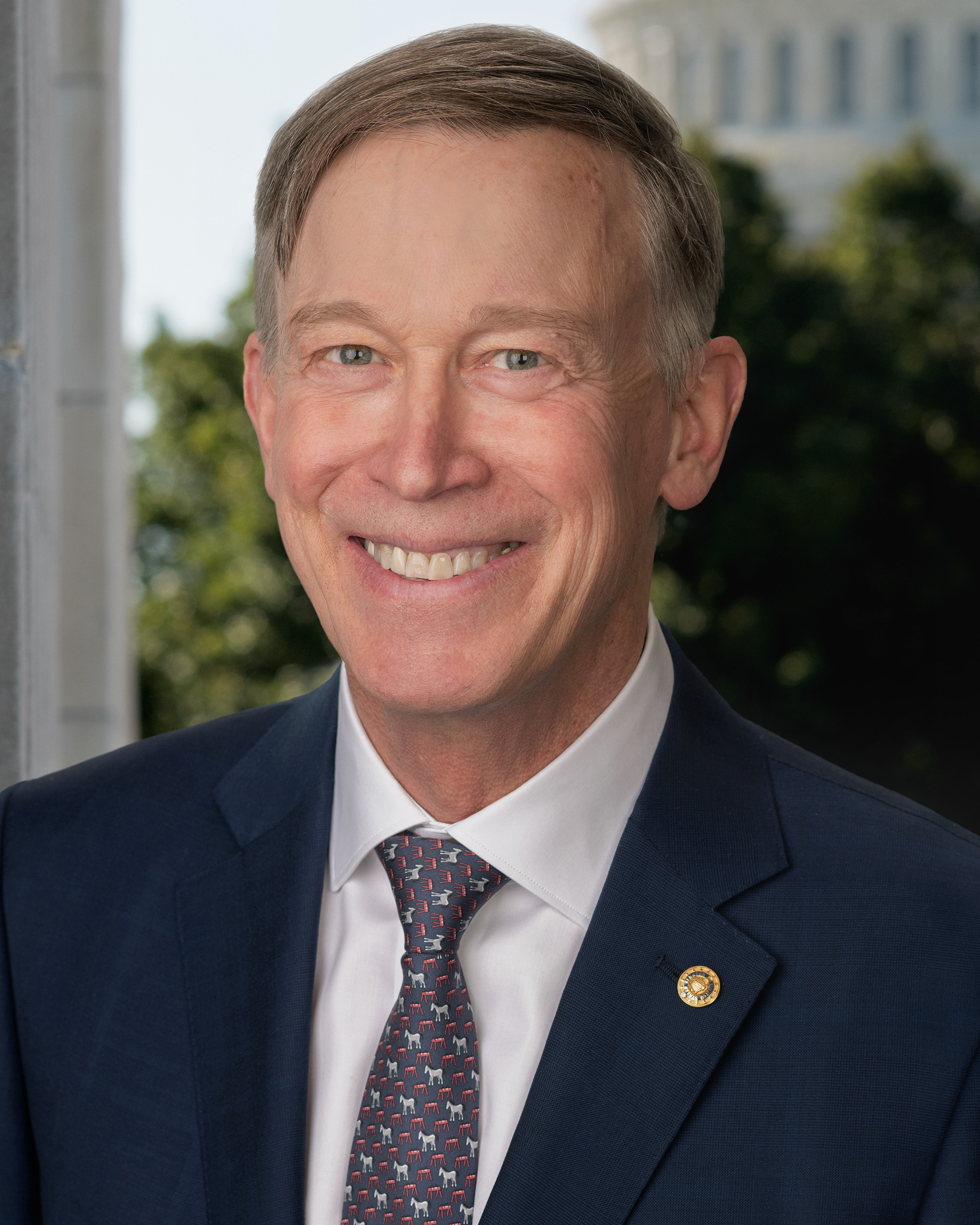

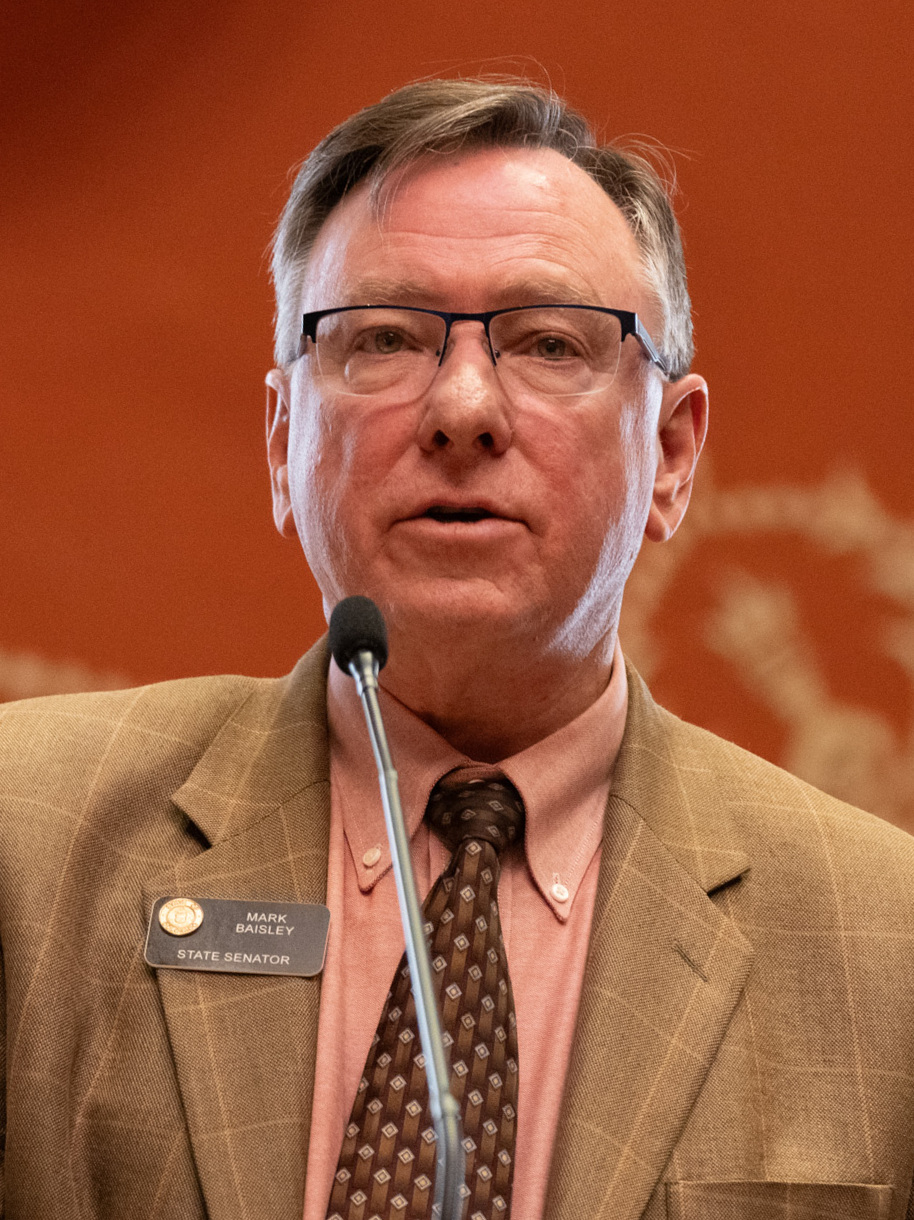
Nominee	John Hickenlooper	Mark Baisley
Party	Democratic	Republican
Popular vote	1,629,507	942,089
Percentage	60.5%	35.0%
- Hickenlooper: 40–50% 50–60% 60–70% 70–80% 80–90% Baisley: 40–50% 50–60% 60–70% 70–80% 80–90%
U.S. senator before election
John Hickenlooper
Democratic
Elected U.S. Senator
John Hickenlooper
Democratic

One-term Democrat John Hickenlooper, elected with 53.5% of the vote in 2020, ran for reelection for a second term, and has said it will be his last term. Hickenlooper defeated progressive state Senator Julie Gonzales in the Democratic primary, 53% to 47%.

State Senator Mark Baisley was the Republican nominee following the Colorado Republican Assembly on April 11, as no other candidates surpassed the 30% threshold.

Hickenlooper was reelected, defeating Baisley in the general election on November 3.

== Delaware ==
Delaware election
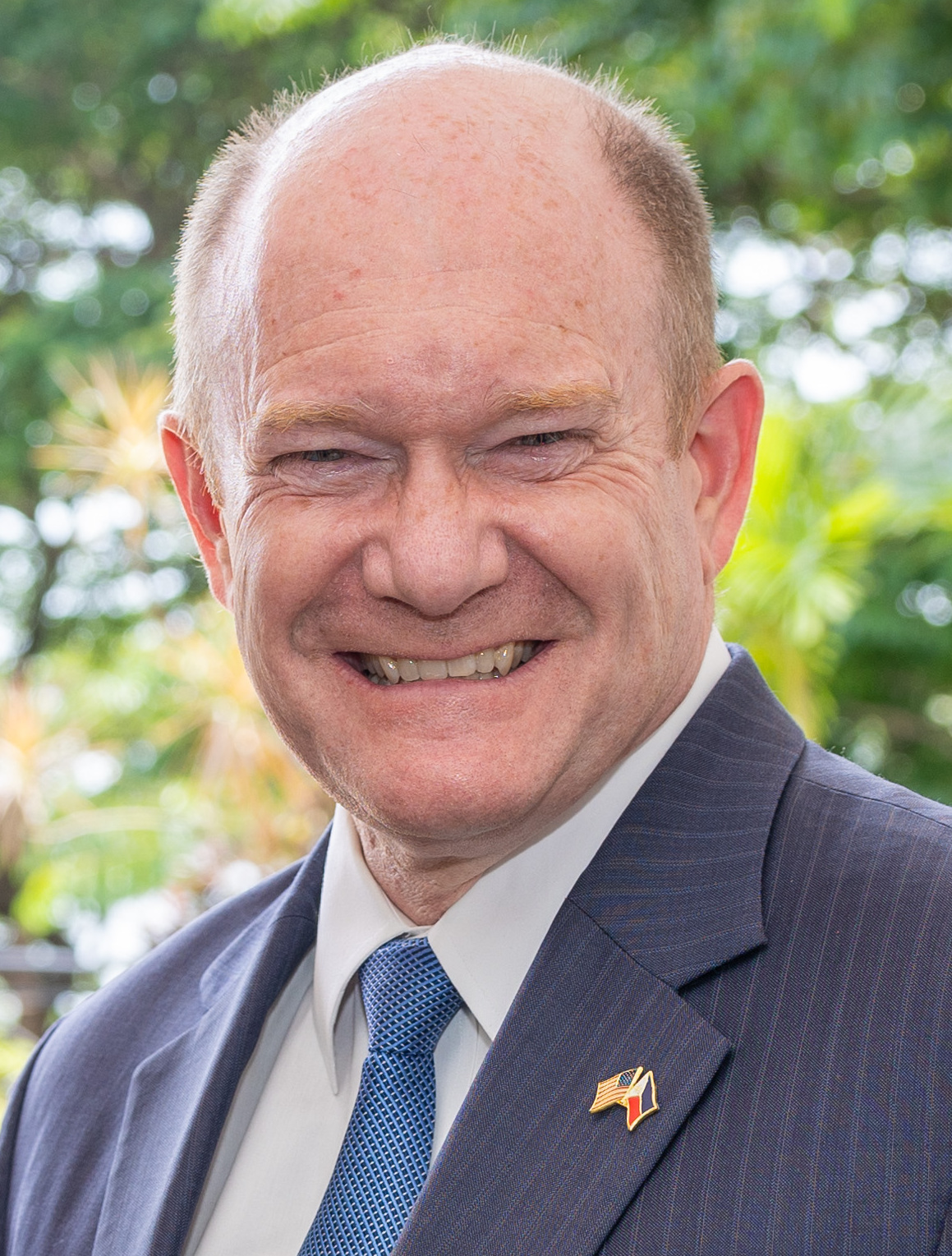

Nominee	Chris Coons	Michael Katz
Party	Democratic	Republican
Popular vote	240,587	137,837
Percentage	63.4%	36.3%
- Coons: 50–60% 70–80%
U.S. senator before election
Chris Coons
Democratic
Elected U.S. senator
Chris Coons
Democratic

Two-term Democrat Chris Coons was reelected in 2020 with 59.4% of the vote and ran for reelection.

Coons faced three challengers in the Democratic primary: philosopher and educator Jeff Appelhans, E. No-Trump Hansen, and domestic violence advocate Mary Louve. Coons won the nomination with approximately 78% of the vote.

Former Democratic state Senator and Independent Party of Delaware nominee for U.S. Senate in 2024 Michael Katz defeated U.S. Army War College instructor John Shulli in the Republican primary.

Coons was reelected, defeating Katz in the general election on November 3.

== Florida (special) ==
Florida special election
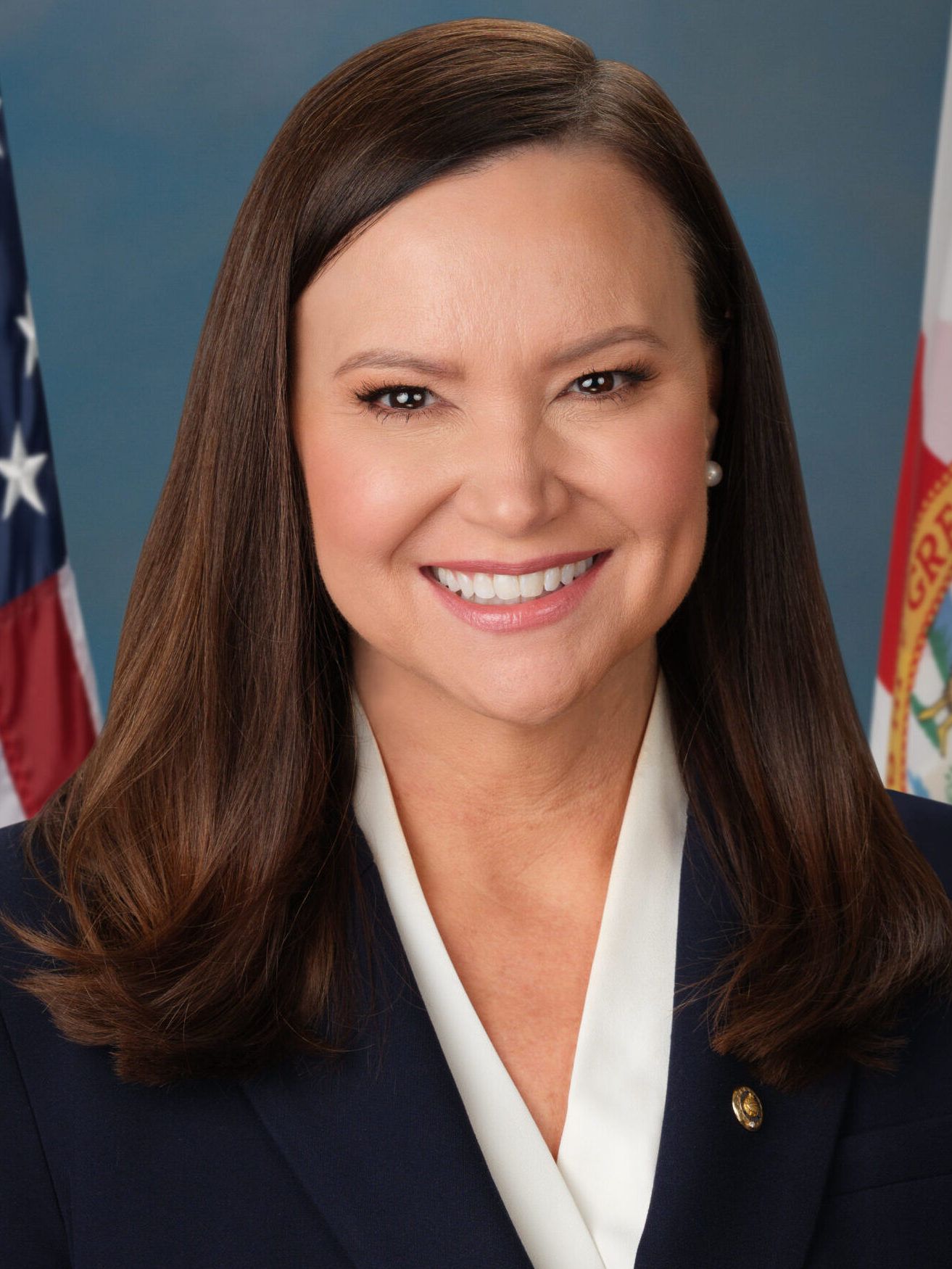

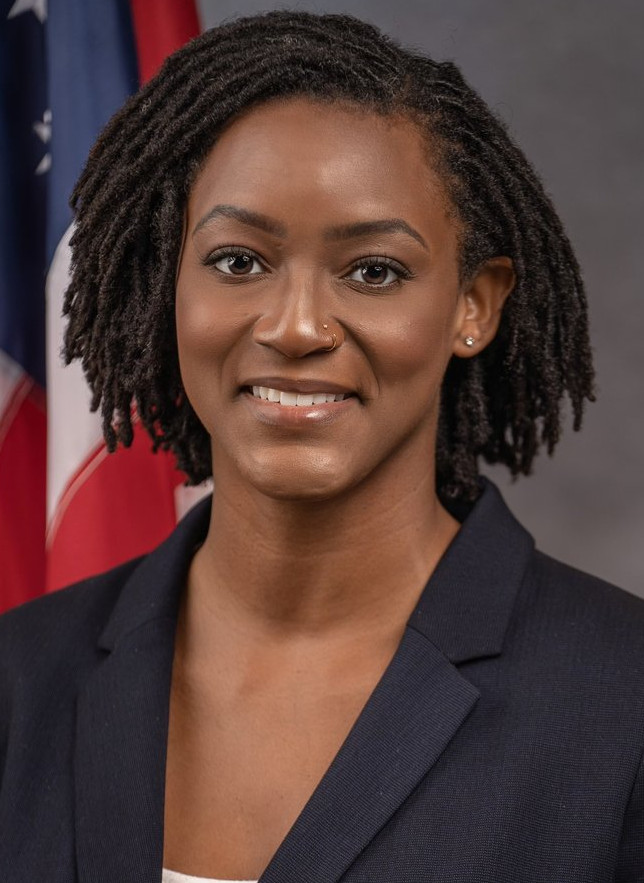
Nominee	Ashley Moody	Angie Nixon
Party	Republican	Democratic
Popular vote	4,211,733	3,975,375
Percentage	50.9%	48.0%
- Moody: 40–50% 50–60% 60–70% 70–80% 80–90% Nixon: 40–50% 50–60% 60–70% 70–80%
U.S. senator before election
Ashley Moody
Republican
Elected U.S. Senator
Ashley Moody
Republican

Three-term Republican Marco Rubio was reelected in 2022 with 57.68% of the vote. He resigned on January 20, 2025, following his confirmation as U.S. Secretary of State. Governor Ron DeSantis subsequently appointed Florida Attorney General Ashley Moody to serve as interim senator until the 2026 special election. Moody ran to serve the remainder of Rubio's term and won the Republican nomination in the August 18 primary.

State Representative Angie Nixon defeated Alex Vindman, former director for European affairs at the U.S. National Security Council, a whistleblower in the 2019 Trump–Ukraine scandal, and the twin brother of Virginia U.S. Representative Eugene Vindman in the August 18 Democratic primary.

In a closer-than-anticipated race, Moody was elected to serve the remainder of the term, defeating Nixon in the November 3 general election.

== Georgia ==
Georgia election
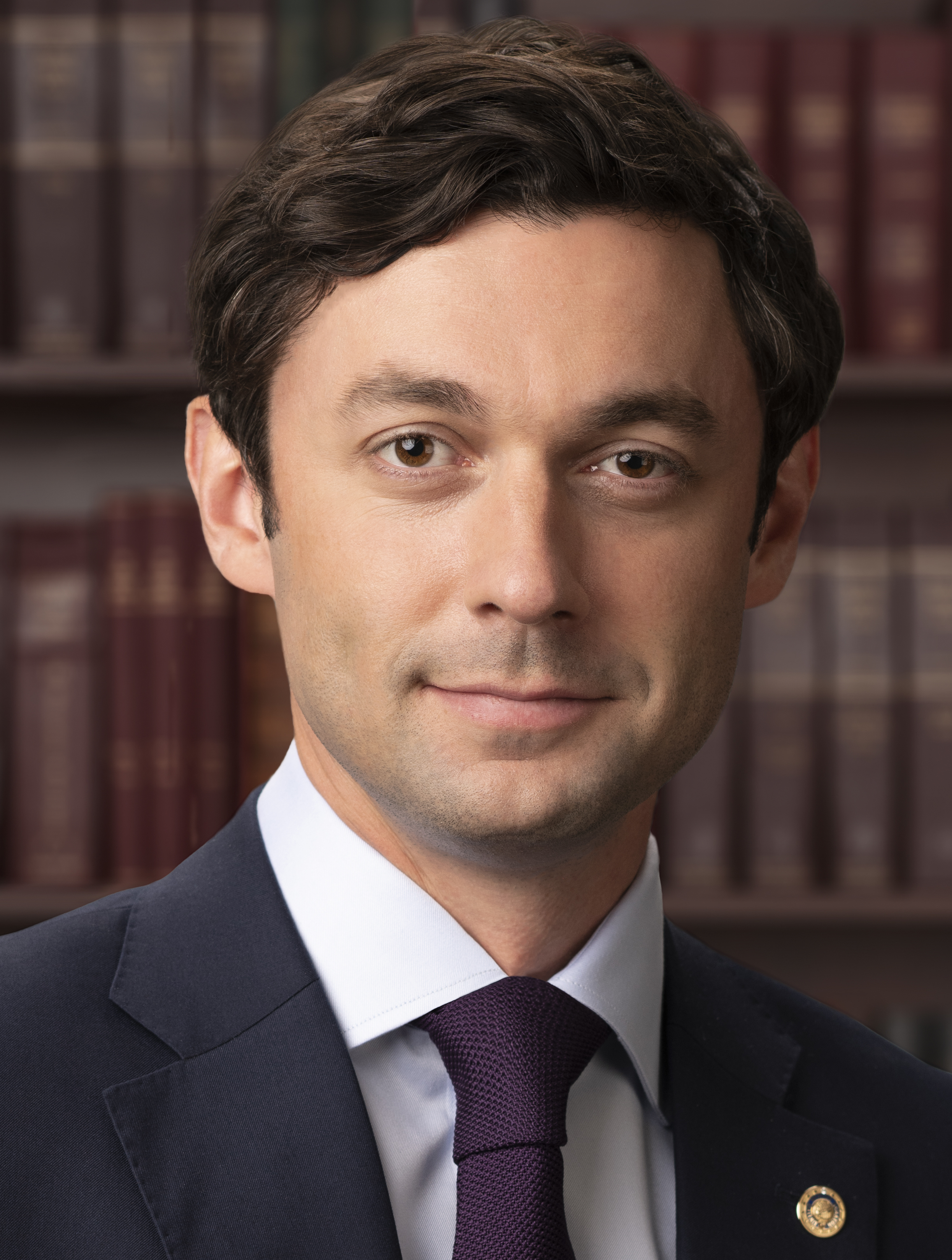

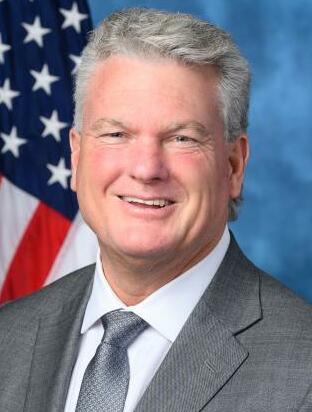
Nominee	Jon Ossoff	Mike Collins
Party	Democratic	Republican
Popular vote	2,469,037	1,713,664
Percentage	59.03%	40.97%
- Ossoff: 50–60% 60–70% 70–80% 80–90% >90% Collins: 50–60% 60–70% 70–80% 80–90% >90% Tie: 50% No data
U.S. senator before election
Jon Ossoff
Democratic
Elected U.S. Senator
Jon Ossoff
Democratic

One-term Democrat Jon Ossoff ran for a second term. He was narrowly elected in a 2021 runoff with 50.6% of the vote. Ossoff won the Democratic nomination unopposed, as he was the only candidate to submit the required number of signatures to appear on the primary ballot.

The Republican primary took place on May 19. U.S. Representative Mike Collins and former University of Tennessee football coach Derek Dooley advanced to a June 16 runoff, which Collins won with 56% of the vote.

Ossoff was reelected, defeating Collins in the general election on November 3.

== Idaho ==
Idaho election
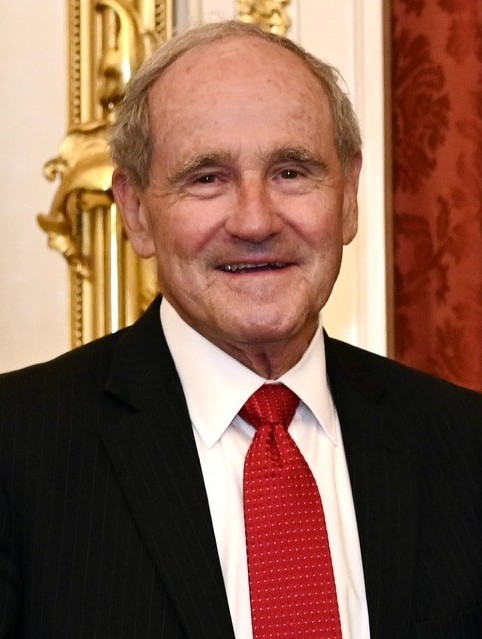

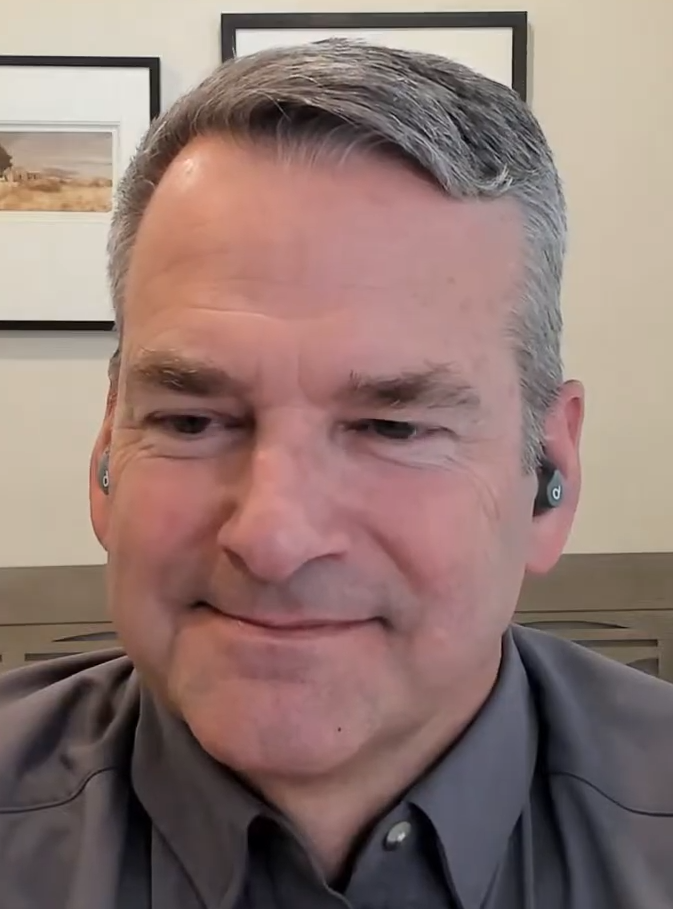

Nominee	Jim Risch	Todd Achilles	Natalie Fleming
Party	Republican	Independent	Independent
Popular vote	401,788	238,352	70,609
Percentage	56.5%	33.5%	7.0%
- Risch: 40–50% 50–60% 60–70% 70–80% 80–90% Achilles: 40–50% 50–60% 60–70%
U.S. senator before election
Jim Risch
Republican
Elected U.S. Senator
Jim Risch
Republican

Three-term Republican Jim Risch was reelected in 2020 with 62.6% of the vote and ran for a fourth term. He won the Republican nomination on May 19, defeating data engineer and 2020 Libertarian nominee for Idaho's 1st congressional district Joe Evans, entrepreneur Denny LaVe, and engineer Josh Roy.

David Roth, a realtor and the Democratic nominee for U.S. Senate in 2022, defeated Nickolas Bonds and Brad Moore in the May 19 Democratic primary, but withdrew from the race on July 28.

Matt Loesby, the nominee for Idaho's 1st congressional district in 2024, is running as a Libertarian. Former Democratic state representative Todd Achilles and software developer Natalie Fleming are running as independents.

Risch was reelected, defeating Achilles in the general election on November 3.

== Illinois ==
Illinois election
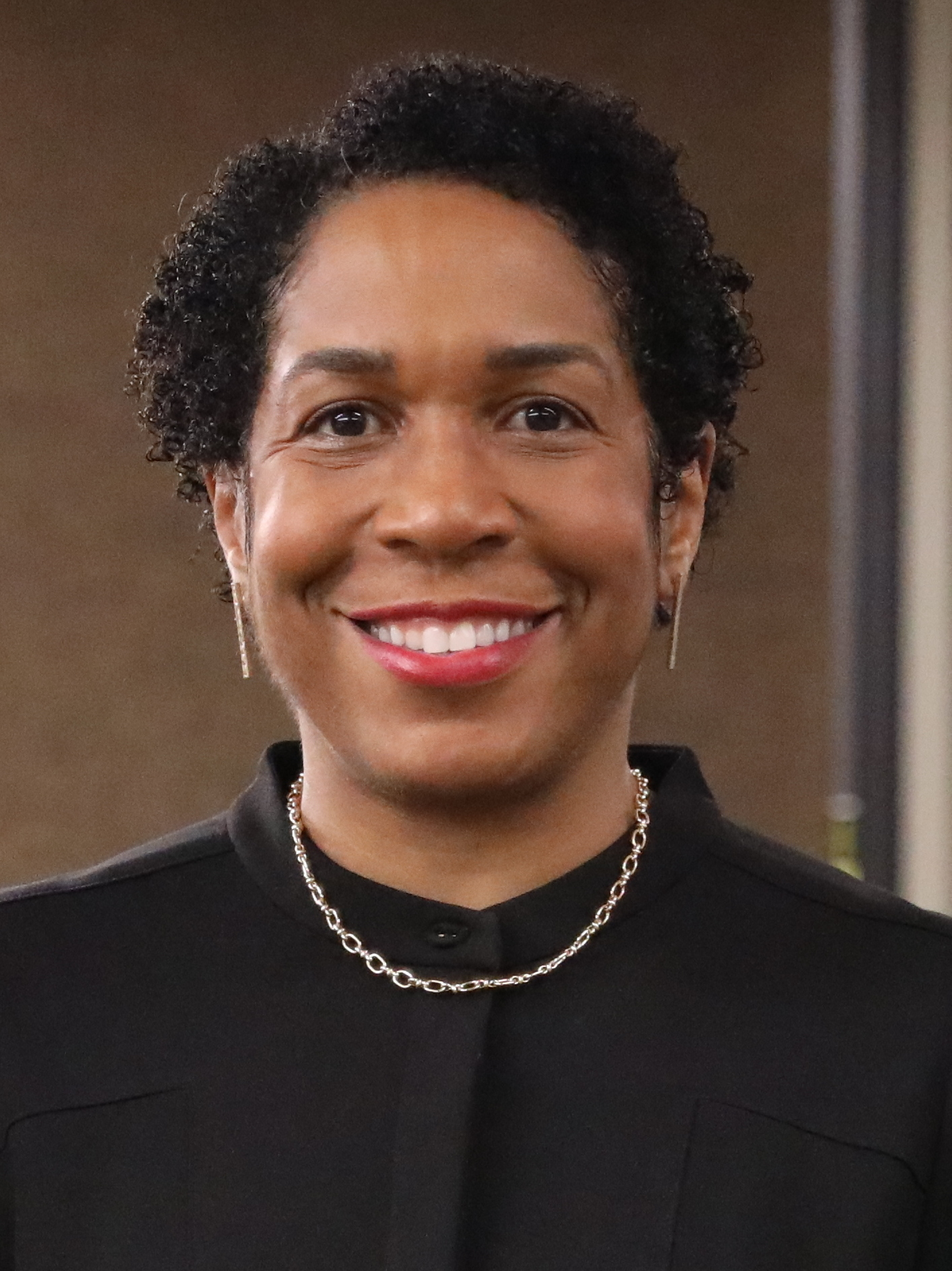

Nominee	Juliana Stratton	Don Tracy
Party	Democratic	Republican
Popular vote	2,499,776	1,510,621
Percentage	61.3%	37.1%
- Stratton: 40–50% 50–60% 60–70% 70–80% Tracy: 40–50% 50–60% 60–70% 70–80% 80–90%
U.S. senator before election
Dick Durbin
Democratic
Elected U.S. senator
Juliana Stratton
Democratic

Five-term Democrat and Senate Democratic Whip Dick Durbin was reelected in 2020 with 54.9% of the vote. On April 23, 2025, he announced he would not run for reelection.

On March 17, 2026, incumbent Lieutenant Governor Juliana Stratton won the Democratic primary, defeating a crowded field, including U.S. Representatives Raja Krishnamoorthi and Robin Kelly.

Former Illinois Republican Party Chairman Don Tracy easily won the Republican primary the same day, defeating attorney Jeannie Evans and Polish American Congress PAC national director Casey Chlebek.

Stratton defeated Tracy in the general election on November 3.

== Iowa ==
Iowa election
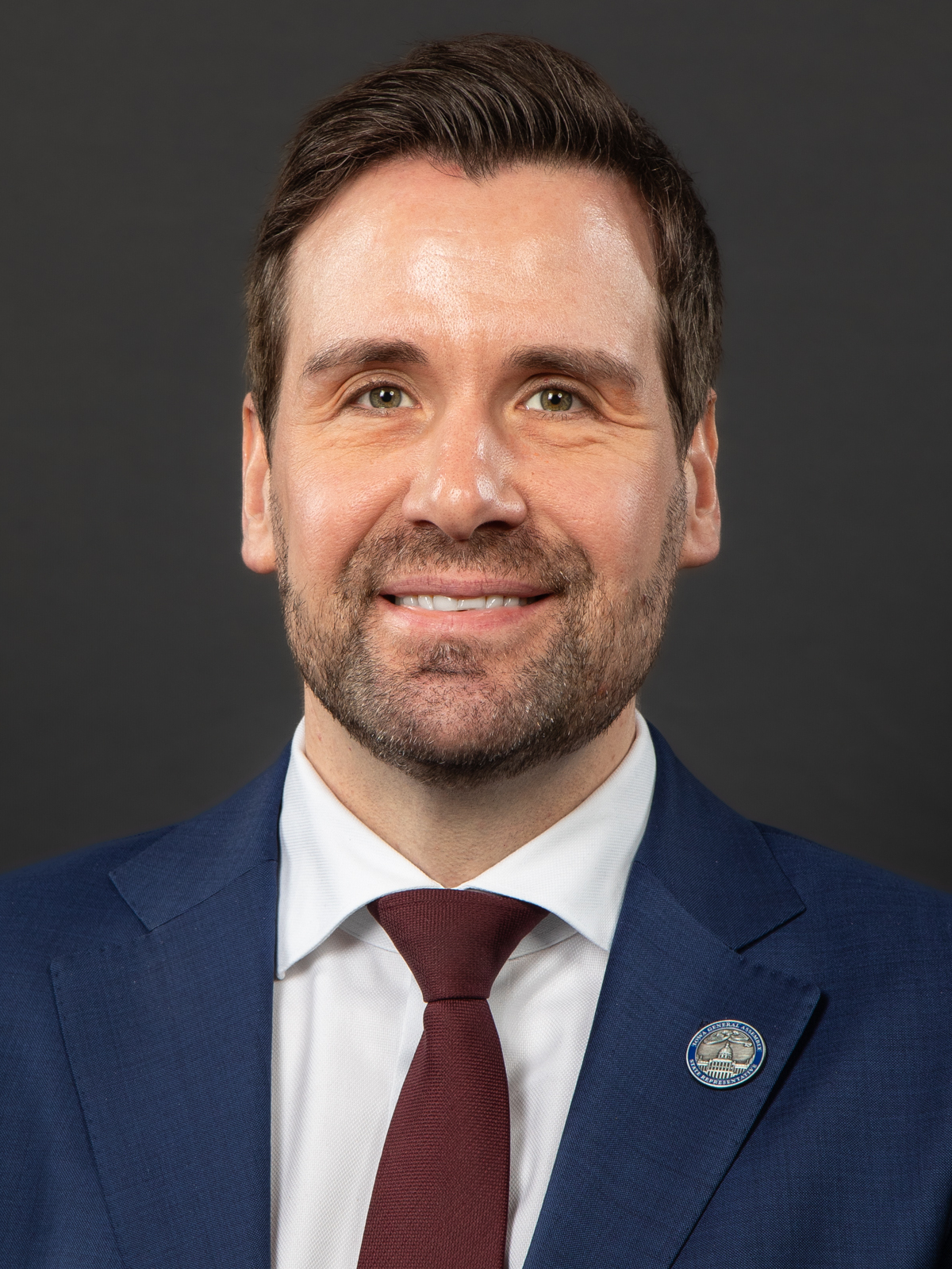

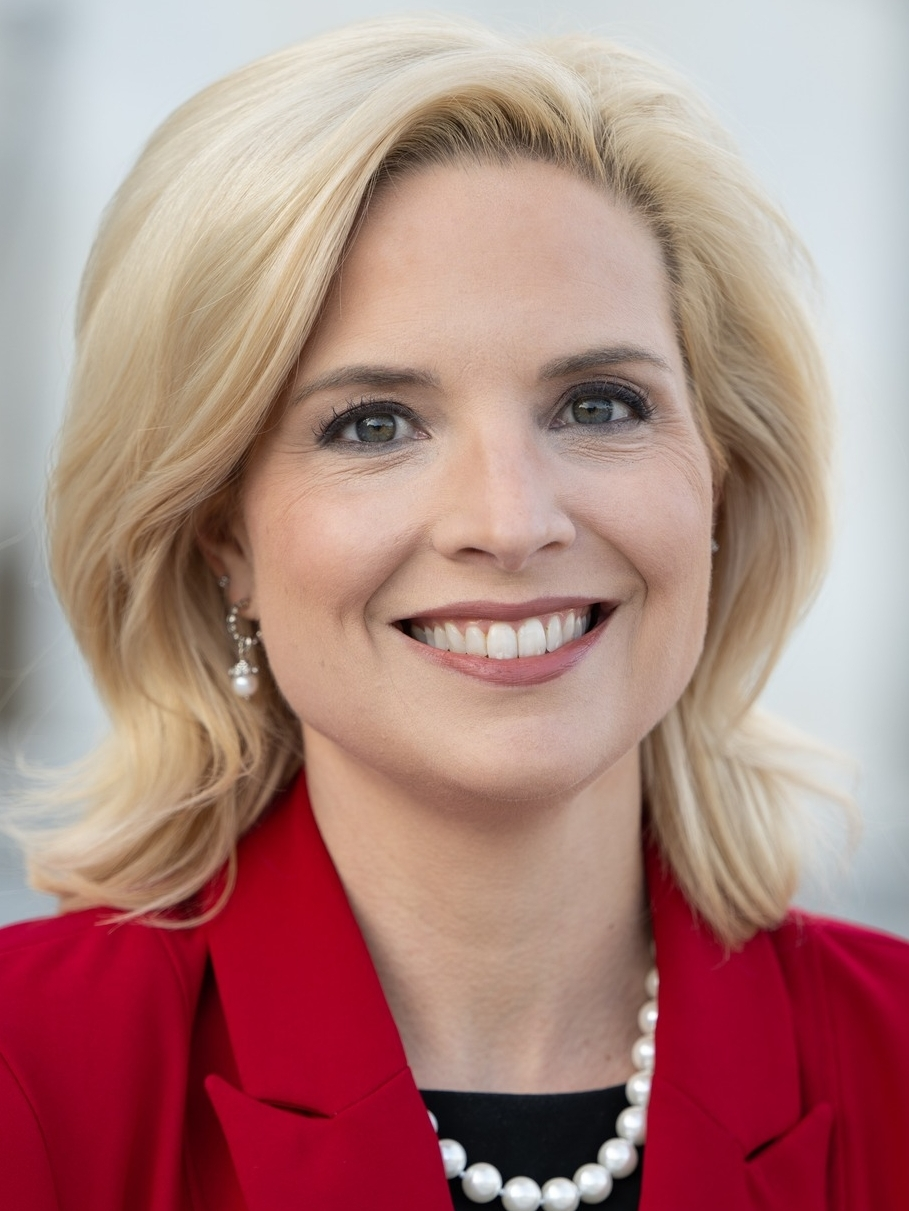
Nominee	Josh Turek	Ashley Hinson
Party	Democratic	Republican
Popular vote	686,641	630,808
Percentage	50.5%	46.4%
- Turek: 40–50% 50–60% 60–70% 70–80% Hinson: 40–50% 50–60% 60–70% 70–80%
U.S. senator before election
Joni Ernst
Republican
Elected U.S. senator
Josh Turek
Democratic

Two-term Republican Joni Ernst was reelected in 2020 with 51.7% of the vote. On September 2, 2025, she announced that she would not seek reelection to a third term, after being criticized for comments about reductions in Medicaid.

U.S. Representative Ashley Hinson easily defeated former state Senator Jim Carlin in the June 2 primary.

In the Democratic primary, state Representative Josh Turek defeated state Senator Zach Wahls by a comfortable margin. Both candidates had cited Ernst's remarks about Medicare as a factor in their decisions to run.

Turek defeated Hinson in the general election on November 3, flipping the seat from Republican to Democratic.

== Kansas ==
Kansas election

Nominee	Adam Hamilton	Roger Marshall
Party	Democratic	Republican
Popular vote	571,573	511,360
Percentage	51.18%	45.79%
- Hamilton: 40–50% 50–60% 60–70% 70–80% Marshall: 40–50% 50–60% 60–70% 70–80% 80–90%
U.S. senator before election
Roger Marshall
Republican
Elected U.S. Senator
Adam Hamilton
Democratic

One-term Republican Roger Marshall was elected in 2020 with 53.2% of the vote and ran for reelection.

Pastor and founder of the United Methodist Church of the Resurrection Adam Hamilton, who initially considered running as an independent, won the Democratic nomination with 35% of the vote. He defeated a field that included former state USDA Director Christy Davis, former federal prosecutor Jason Hart, commercial real estate developer Erik Murray, attorney Anne Parelkar, state senator Patrick Schmidt, art gallery owner Mike Soetaert, former financial services executive Sandy Spidel Neumann, and counterintelligence specialist Noah Tyler.

Hamilton defeated Marshall in the general election on November 3, flipping the seat from Republican to Democratic, becoming the first Democrat to win a Senate election in Kansas since 1932.

== Kentucky ==
Kentucky election

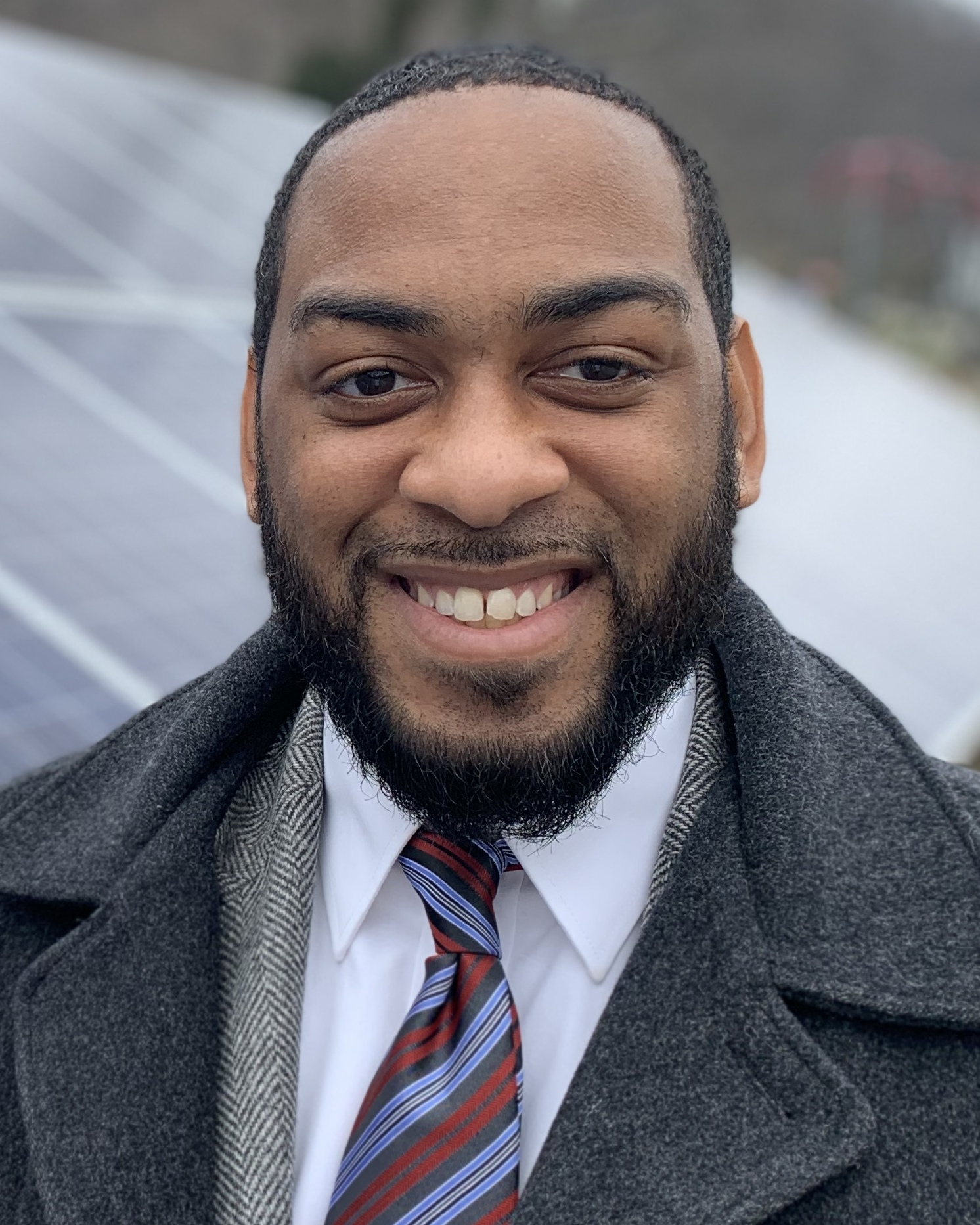
Nominee	Andy Barr	Charles Booker
Party	Republican	Democratic
Popular vote	784,869	612,357
Percentage	55.0%	42.9%
- County results Barr: 40–50% 50–60% 60–70% 70–80% 80–90% Booker: 50–60% 60–70%
U.S. senator before election
Mitch McConnell
Republican
Elected U.S. Senator
Andy Barr
Republican

Seven-term Republican and former Senate Republican Leader Mitch McConnell was reelected in 2020 with 57.8% of the vote. McConnell retired as leader after the 2024 elections with plans to serve out the remainder of his term. On February 20, 2025, McConnell announced he would not seek reelection.

On May 19, U.S. Representative Andy Barr of Kentucky's 6th congressional district defeated a crowded field that included former Kentucky Attorney General and 2023 Republican gubernatorial nominee Daniel Cameron for the Republican nomination.

Former state Representative Charles Booker, the 2022 Senate nominee and a former staffer for Governor Andy Beshear, won the May 19 Democratic primary. The seven-candidate field included 2020 nominee and former Marine fighter pilot Amy McGrath.

Barr defeated Booker in the general election on November 3.

== Louisiana ==
Louisiana election

Nominee	Julia Letlow	Jamie Davis
Party	Republican	Democratic
Popular vote	745,963	720,106
Percentage	50.9%	49.1%
- Letlow: 50–60% 60–70% 70–80% 80–90% Davis: 50–60% 60–70% 70–80% 80–90%
U.S. senator before election
Bill Cassidy
Republican
Elected U.S. Senator
Julia Letlow
Republican

Two-term Republican Bill Cassidy was reelected in 2020 with 59.3% of the vote in the first round of the "Louisiana primary" and ran for reelection to a third term. 2026 was the first Senate election after Louisiana switched to a system of partisan primaries, which were closed to members of other parties but open to unaffiliated voters.

Cassidy placed a distant third in the Republican primary, and U.S. Representative Julia Letlow and state Treasurer and former U.S. representative John Fleming advanced to the Republican runoff. Letlow, who was endorsed by President Donald Trump, defeated Fleming in the runoff.

Sorghum farmer Jamie Davis and data scientist and political consultant Gary Crockett advanced to the Democratic primary runoff, while nonprofit executive Nick Albares placed third. Davis defeated Crockett in the runoff.

In a closer-than-anticipated race, Letlow defeated Davis in the general election on November 3.

== Maine ==
Maine election
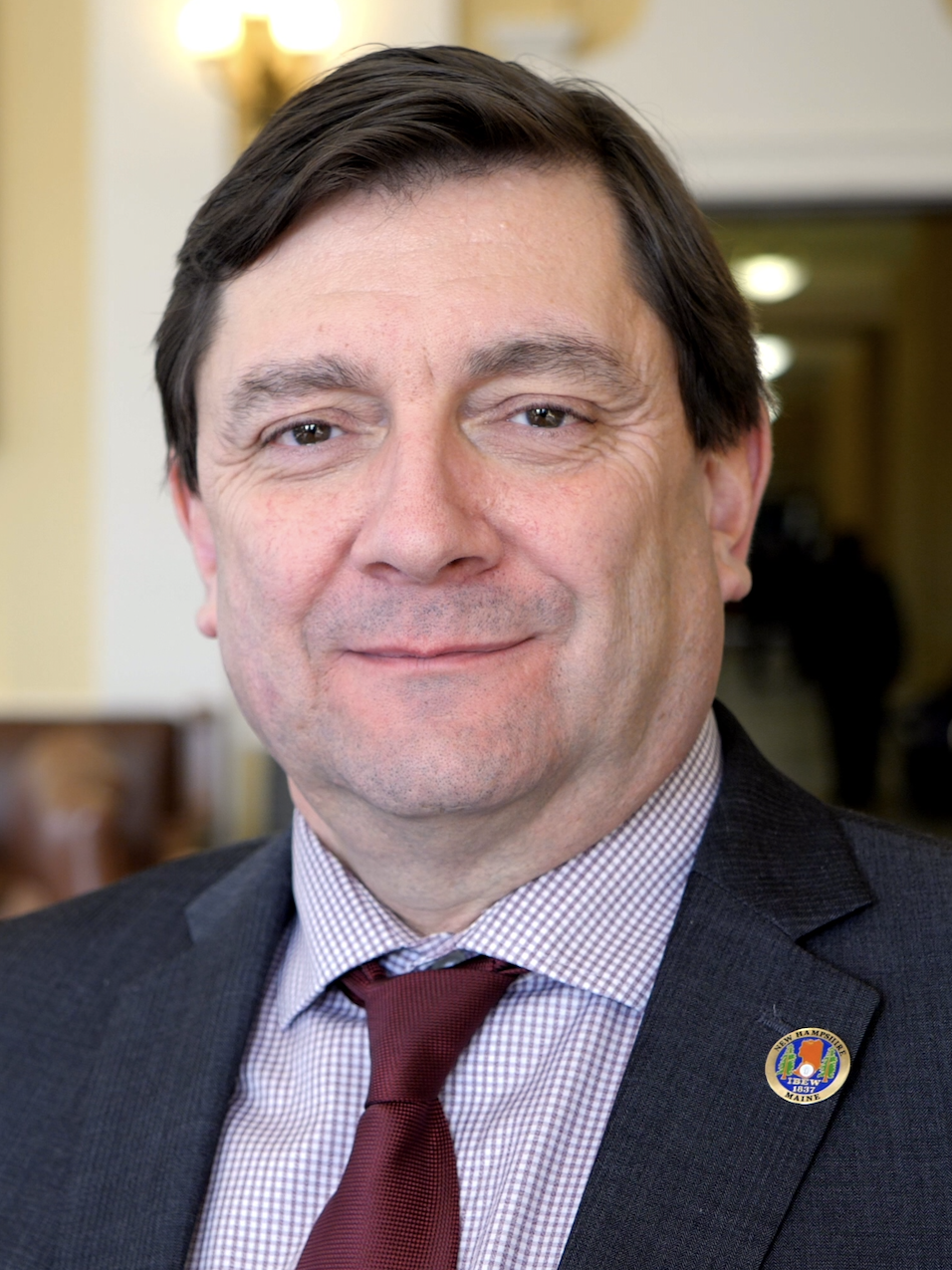

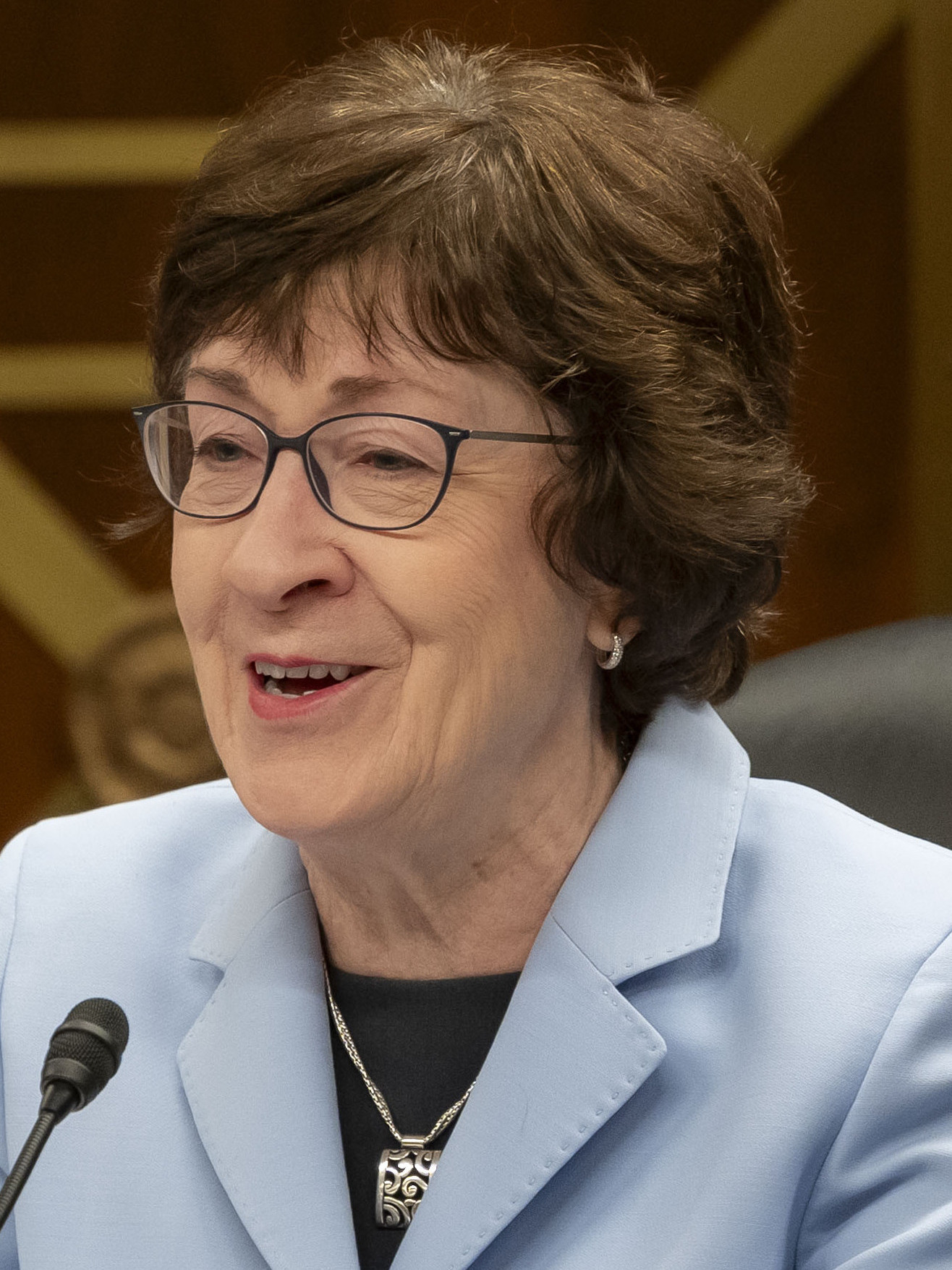
Nominee	Troy Jackson	Susan Collins
Party	Democratic	Republican
Popular vote	375,516	330,994
Percentage	53.1%	46.8%
- Jackson: 50–60% 60–70% 70–80% 80–90% >90% Collins: 50–60% 60–70% 70–80% 80–90% >90% No votes
U.S. senator before election
Susan Collins
Republican
Elected U.S. Senator
Troy Jackson
Democratic

Incumbent Republican Senator Susan Collins was reelected with 51% of the vote to 42% for her Democratic opponent in 2020. She formally announced her reelection campaign in February 2026. As the only person to submit the necessary number of signatures to appear on the primary ballot, Collins is the Republican nominee.

Throughout 2025, Governor Janet Mills was seen as a potential Democratic challenger to Collins. She announced her Senate candidacy in October, and pledged to serve only one term if elected. She suspended her campaign on April 30, 2026, due to a lack of financial resources and poor polling numbers.

On June 9, Sullivan harbor master and Marine veteran Graham Platner defeated former deputy secretary of the Maryland Department of the Environment David Costello for the Democratic nomination with 72% of the vote.

On July 8, Platner announced his withdrawal from the race, following allegations of sexual assault, which he denied. The same day, Maine Democrats voted to hold a state convention to select a replacement nominee. Candidates seeking the nomination were required to collect at least 500 signatures, including 50 from each of eight counties. During county meetings to select convention delegates, approximately 456 delegates pledged their support to former state Senator Troy Jackson. Jackson subsequently defeated Saundra Pelletier at the convention by a vote of 566–5.

Jackson defeated Collins in the general election on November 3, flipping the seat from Republican to Democratic.

== Massachusetts ==
Massachusetts election

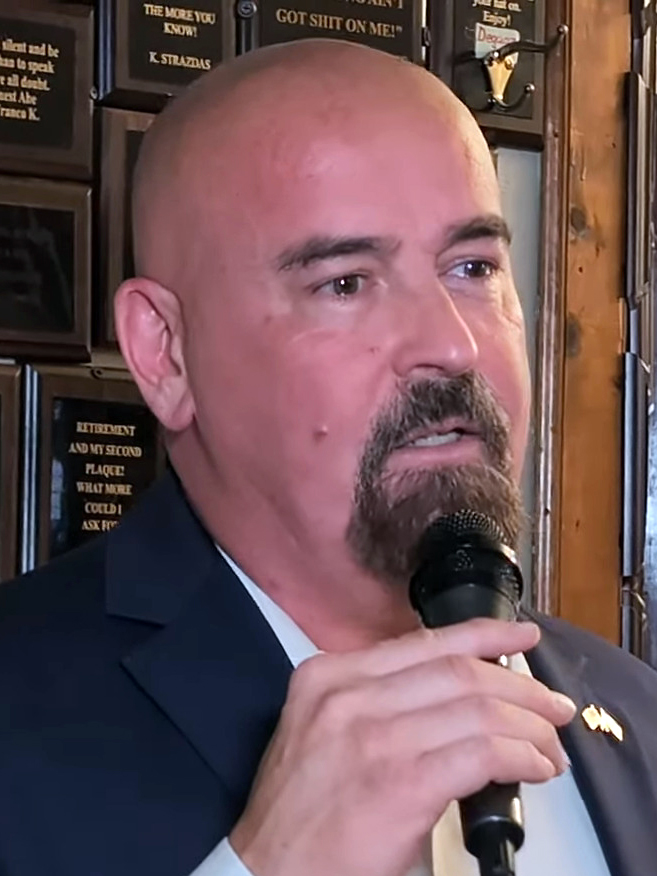
Nominee	Ed Markey	John Deaton
Party	Democratic	Republican
Popular vote	1,718,276	855,969
Percentage	63.7%	31.7%
- Markey: 40–50% 50–60% 60–70% 70–80% 80–90% 90–100% Deaton: 40–50% 50–60% No votes
U.S. senator before election
Ed Markey
Democratic
Elected U.S. Senator
Ed Markey
Democratic

Two-term Democrat Ed Markey was reelected to a third term with 63.4% of the vote. In the 2020 election he had won with 66.2%. The longest-serving Democrat in Congress, Markey was 80 years old on Election Day and has faced calls to retire. Markey defeated U.S. Representative Seth Moulton in the September 1 Democratic primary.

Attorney John Deaton, who was the Republican nominee against U.S. Senator Elizabeth Warren in 2024, was again the Republican nominee.

Markey was reelected, defeating Deaton in the general election on November 3.

== Michigan ==
Michigan election
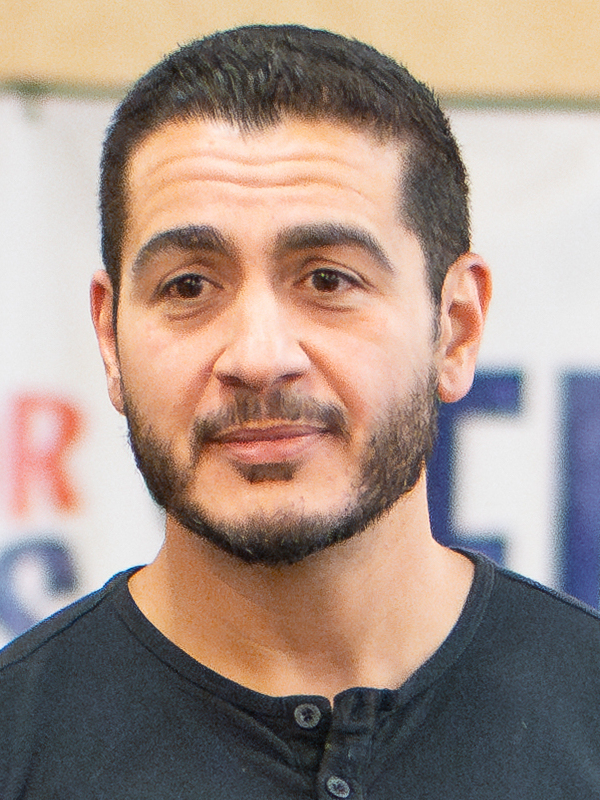

Nominee	Abdul El-Sayed	Mike Rogers
Party	Democratic	Republican
Popular vote	2,520,388	2,180,541
Percentage	52.5%	45.5%
- El-Sayed: 40–50% 50–60% 60–70% 70–80% Rogers: 40–50% 50–60% 60–70% 70–80%
U.S. senator before election
Gary Peters
Democratic
Elected U.S. senator
Abdul El-Sayed
Democratic

Two-term Democrat Gary Peters was narrowly reelected in 2020 with 49.9% of the vote. On January 28, 2025, he announced that he would not seek reelection.

Former Wayne County Health, Human, and Veterans Services Department Director Abdul El-Sayed, U.S. Representative Haley Stevens of the 11th congressional district, and State Senator Mallory McMorrow ran in the Democratic primary. El-Sayed narrowly defeated Stevens and was the Democratic nominee.

Former U.S. Representative for the 8th congressional district and 2024 U.S. Senate nominee Mike Rogers was the Republican nominee.

El-Sayed defeated Rogers in the general election on November 3.

== Minnesota ==
Minnesota election
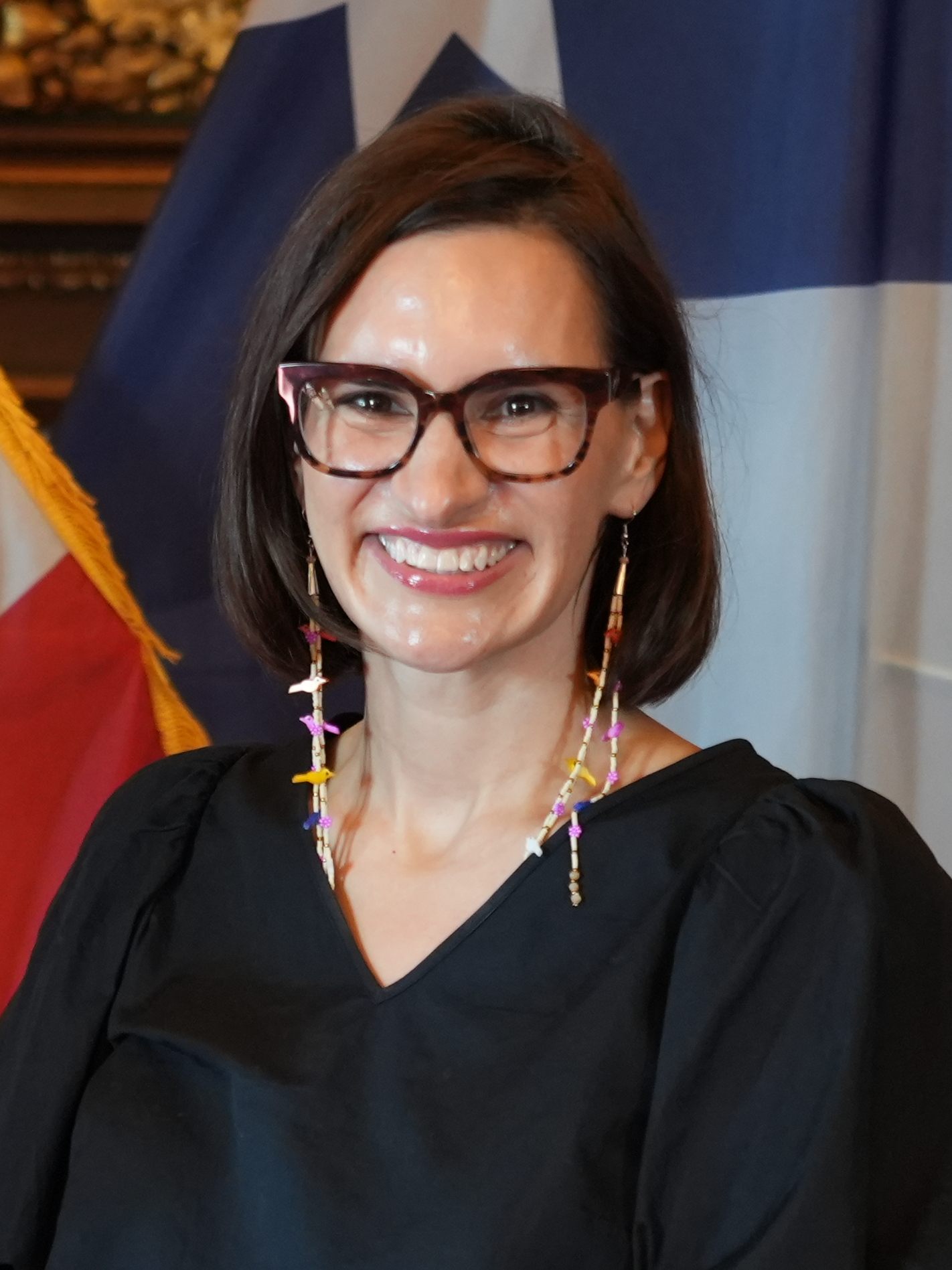

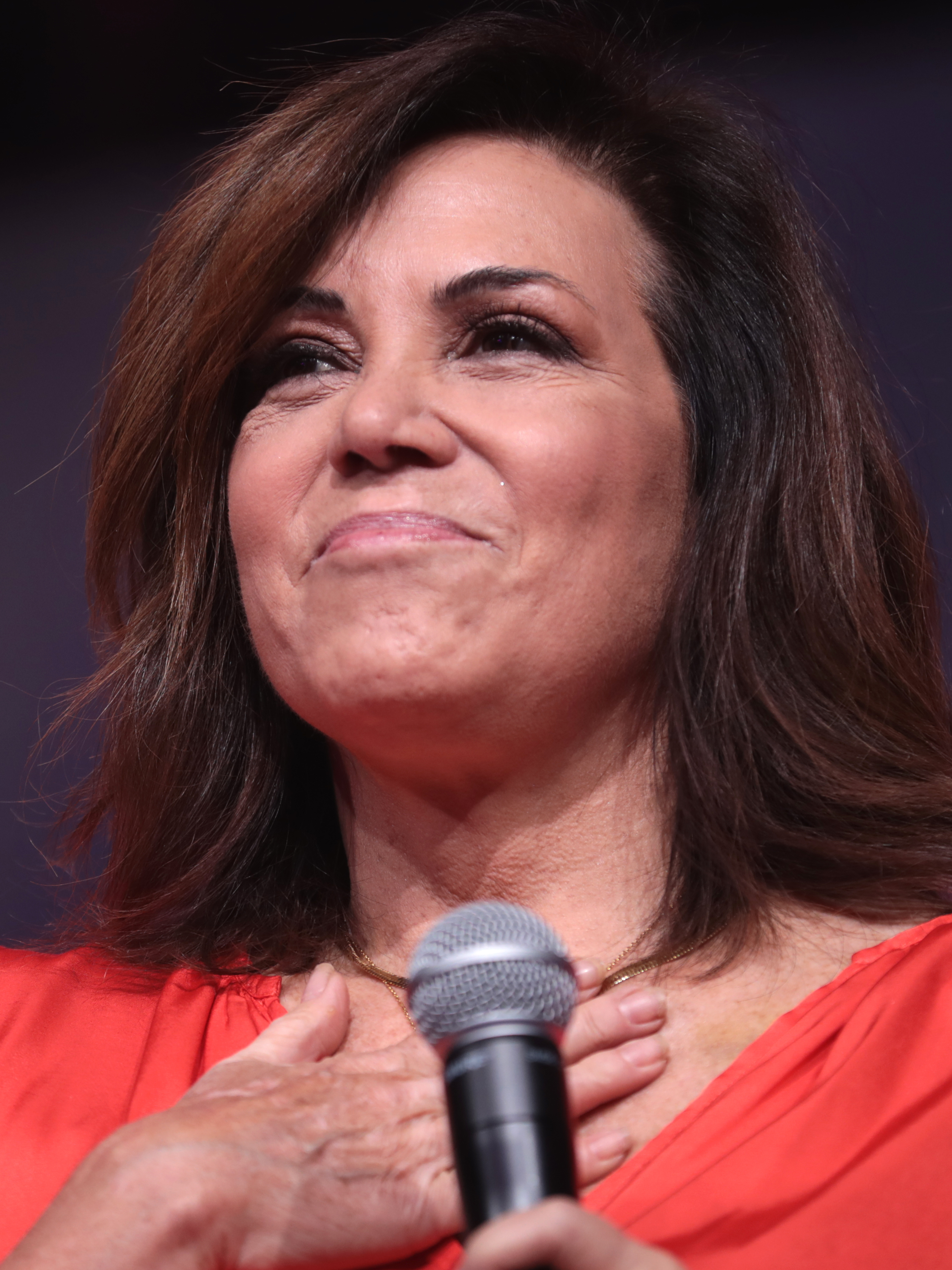
Nominee	Peggy Flanagan	Michele Tafoya
Party	Democratic (DFL)	Republican
Popular vote	1,520,871	1,233,467
Percentage	53.7%	43.6%
- Flanagan: 40–50% 50–60% 60–70% 70–80% 80–90% >90% Tafoya: 40–50% 50–60% 60–70% 70–80% 80–90% >90% Tie: 40–50% 50% No votes
U.S. senator before election
Tina Smith
Democratic (DFL)
Elected U.S. senator
Peggy Flanagan
Democratic (DFL)

One-term Democrat Tina Smith was reelected in 2020 with 48.7% of the vote after being appointed by Governor Mark Dayton in 2018 following Al Franken's resignation and then winning a special election that year. On February 13, 2025, she announced she would not seek a second full term in 2026. Incumbent Lieutenant Governor Peggy Flanagan announced her candidacy the same day. U.S. Representative Angie Craig announced her candidacy on April 29. Flanagan won the nomination with 59% of the vote.

The Republican primary included sportscaster Michele Tafoya, 2024 Republican U.S. Senate nominee and former professional basketball player Royce White, retired U.S. Navy officer Tom Weiler, and former Navy SEAL Adam Schwarze. Tafoya ultimately won the nomination with 52% of the vote.

Flanagan defeated Tafoya in the general election on November 3.

== Mississippi ==
Mississippi election

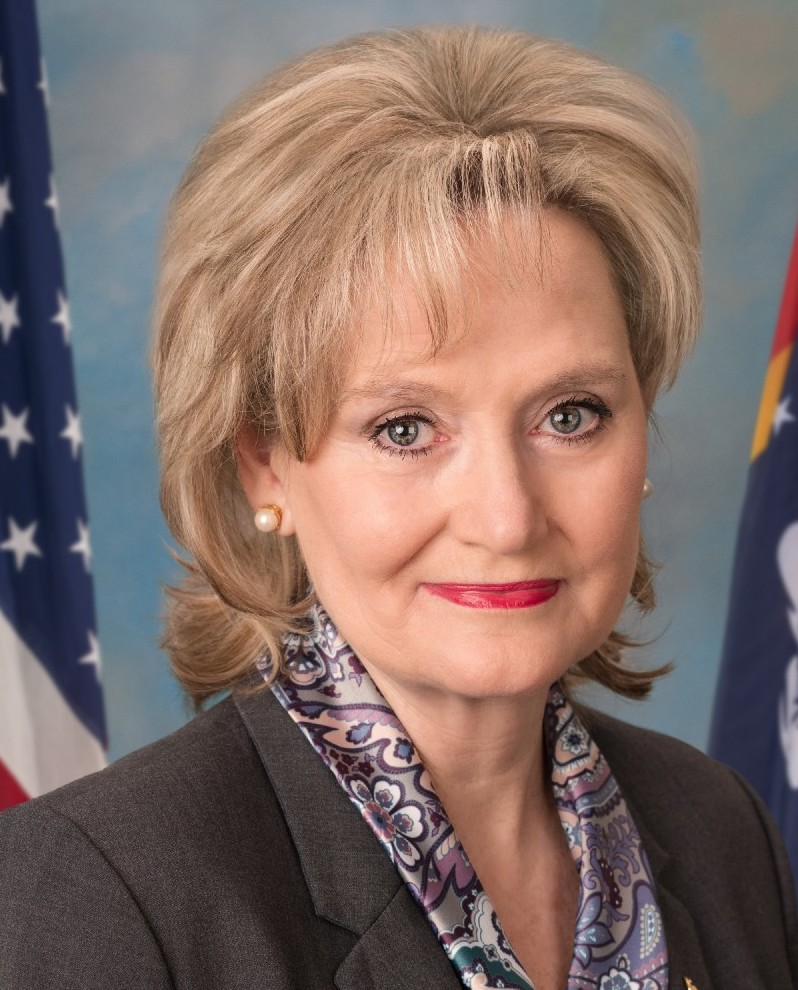
Nominee	Scott Colom	Cindy Hyde-Smith
Party	Democratic	Republican
Popular vote	480,153	472,122
Percentage	49.36%	48.54%
- Colom: 40–50% 50–60% 60–70% 70–80% 80–90% Hyde-Smith: 40–50% 50–60% 60–70% 70–80% 80–90%
U.S. senator before election
Cindy Hyde-Smith
Republican
Elected U.S. Senator
Scott Colom
Democratic

One-term Republican Cindy Hyde-Smith was reelected in 2020 with 54.1% of the vote after being appointed in 2018 and winning a special election later that year. She ran for a second full term in office. She defeated physician Sarah Adlakha in the Republican primary on March 10, 2026.

Lowndes County District Attorney Scott Colom defeated U.S. Marine Corps veteran Albert Littell, and Priscilla Williams-Till, a cousin of Emmett Till, in the Democratic primary on March 10, 2026.

Ty Pinkins, the Democratic nominee for Secretary of State in 2023 and for U.S. Senate in 2024 ran as an independent. He said his goal was to be a spoiler candidate for Cindy Hyde-Smith.

In a more competitive race than anticipated, Colom defeated Hyde-Smith in the November 3 general election, flipping the seat from Republican to Democratic.

== Montana ==
Montana election
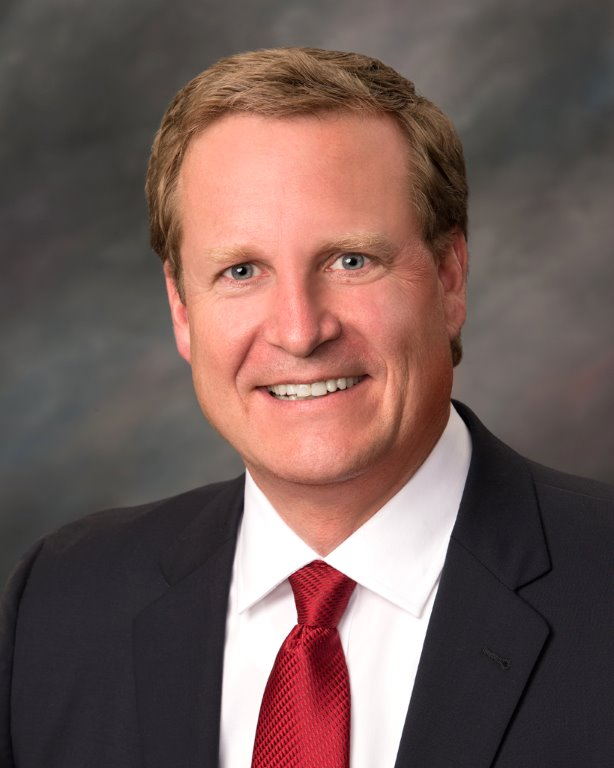

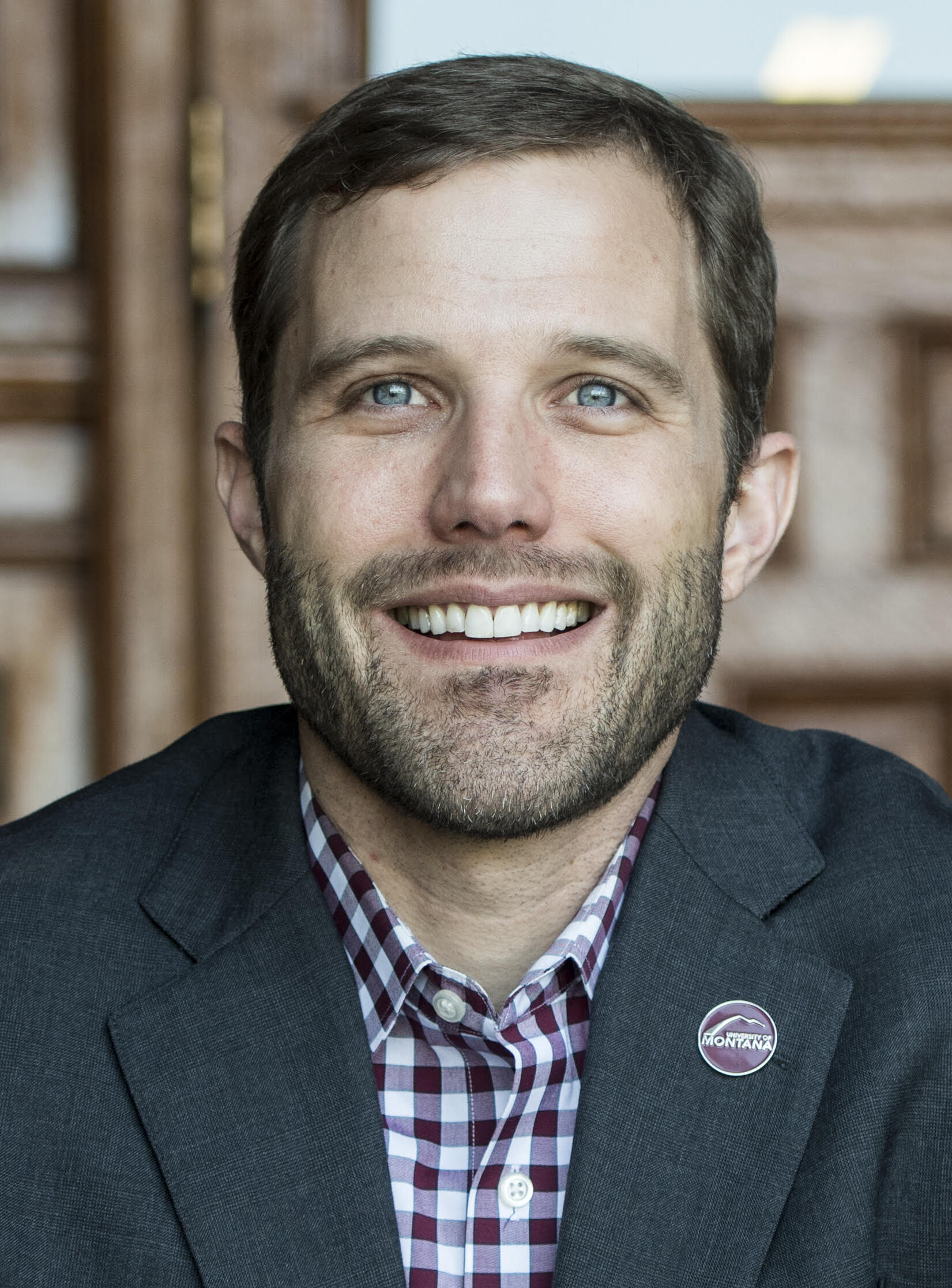

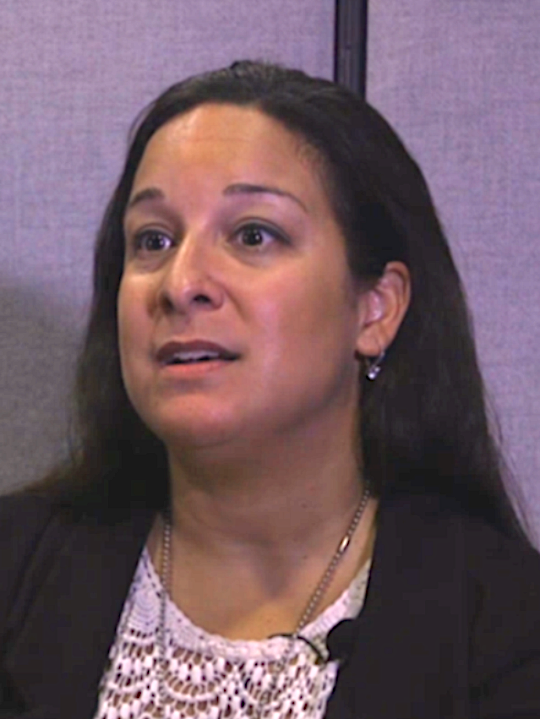
Nominee	Kurt Alme	Seth Bodnar	Alani Bankhead
Party	Republican	Independent	Democratic
Popular vote	232,916	181,674	58,555
Percentage	48.3%	37.7%	12.1%
- Alme: 30–40% 40–50% 50–60% 60–70% 70–80% 80–90% Bodnar: 40–50% 50–60%
U.S. senator before election
Steve Daines
Republican
Elected U.S. Senator
Kurt Alme
Republican

Two-term Republican Steve Daines was reelected in 2020 with 55% of the vote. On March 4, 2026, Daines announced he would not seek reelection. The same day, U.S. Attorney Kurt Alme announced his candidacy and immediately won Daines's endorsement.

Former state Representative Reilly Neill ran for the Democratic nomination, but was defeated in the Democratic primary by former U.S. Air Force Lieutenant Colonel Alani Bankhead in a major upset.

Seth Bodnar, the president of the University of Montana until January 2026, ran as an independent candidate. Despite calls from dozens of local Democratic lawmakers to withdraw in favor of Bodnar, Bankhead refused to do so.

Alme defeated Bodnar and Bankhead in the November 3 general election, with Bodnar and Bankhead dividing the opposition vote.

== Nebraska ==
Nebraska election
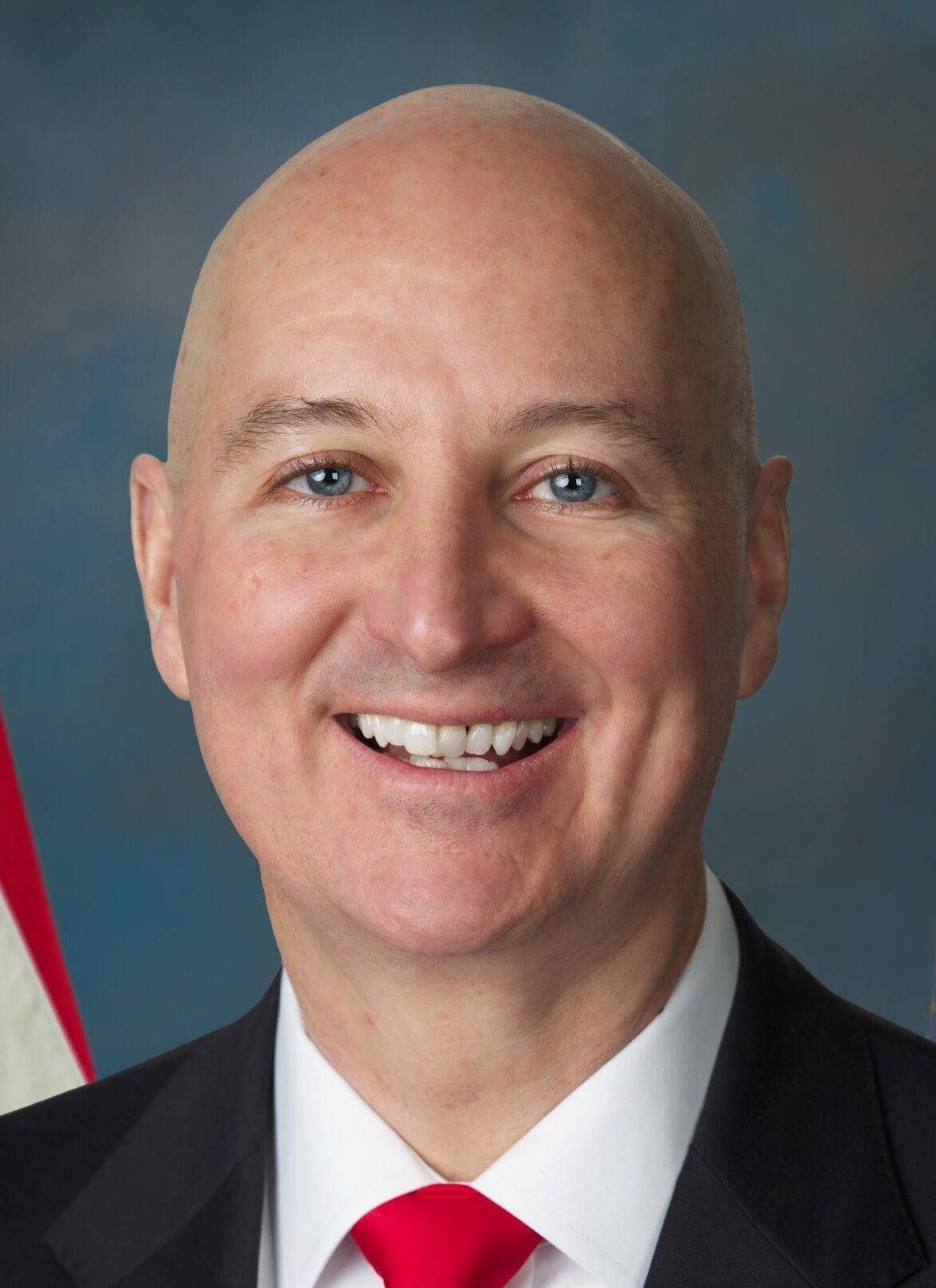

Nominee	Pete Ricketts	Dan Osborn
Party	Republican	Independent
Popular vote	381,127	336,261
Percentage	50.0%	44.1%
- Ricketts: 40–50% 50–60% 60–70% 70–80% 80–90% Osborn: 40–50% 50–60%
U.S. senator before election
Pete Ricketts
Republican
Elected U.S. Senator
Pete Ricketts
Republican

Two-term Republican Ben Sasse resigned early in the 118th Congress to become president of the University of Florida. On January 12, 2023, Governor Jim Pillen appointed former governor Pete Ricketts as senator. Ricketts won the 2024 special election to complete Sasse's term, defeating college professor Preston Love Jr., and subsequently sought his first full term.

Former labor union leader Dan Osborn, who challenged Republican Deb Fischer for Nebraska's Class I Senate seat, ran as an independent.

The Nebraska Democratic Party declined to recruit a candidate to challenge Ricketts, and the party's chair endorsed Osborn. Several candidates nevertheless entered the Democratic primary, raising concerns that a Democratic nominee could divide the opposition vote in the general election. Retired pharmacy technician Cindy Burbank won the Democratic primary but subsequently said she would withdraw from the general election if she saw no viable path to victory. She withdrew her candidacy on July 17.

Ricketts was reelected, defeating Osborn in the general election on November 3.

== New Hampshire ==
New Hampshire election

Nominee	Chris Pappas	John E. Sununu
Party	Democratic	Republican
Popular vote	355,720	268,340
Percentage	55.9%	42.2%
- Pappas: 40–50% 50–60% 60–70% 70–80% 80–90% Sununu: 40–50% 50–60% 60–70% 70–80% 80–90% Tie No votes
U.S. senator before election
Jeanne Shaheen
Democratic
Elected U.S. Senator
Chris Pappas
Democratic

Three-term Democrat Jeanne Shaheen was reelected in 2020 with 56.6% of the vote. On March 12, 2025, Shaheen announced that she would not seek reelection to a fourth term.

U.S. Representative Chris Pappas defeated New Hampshire Democratic Party rules committee member Karishma Manzur to win the Democratic nomination on September 8.

Former U.S. Senator John E. Sununu won the Republican nomination on September 8, defeating former Massachusetts U.S. Senator and U.S. Ambassador to New Zealand and Samoa Scott Brown. Both have previously lost Senate races to Shaheen: Sununu in 2008 and Brown in 2014. Sununu's brother, former Governor Chris Sununu, declined to run.

Pappas defeated Sununu in the general election on November 3.

== New Jersey ==
New Jersey election
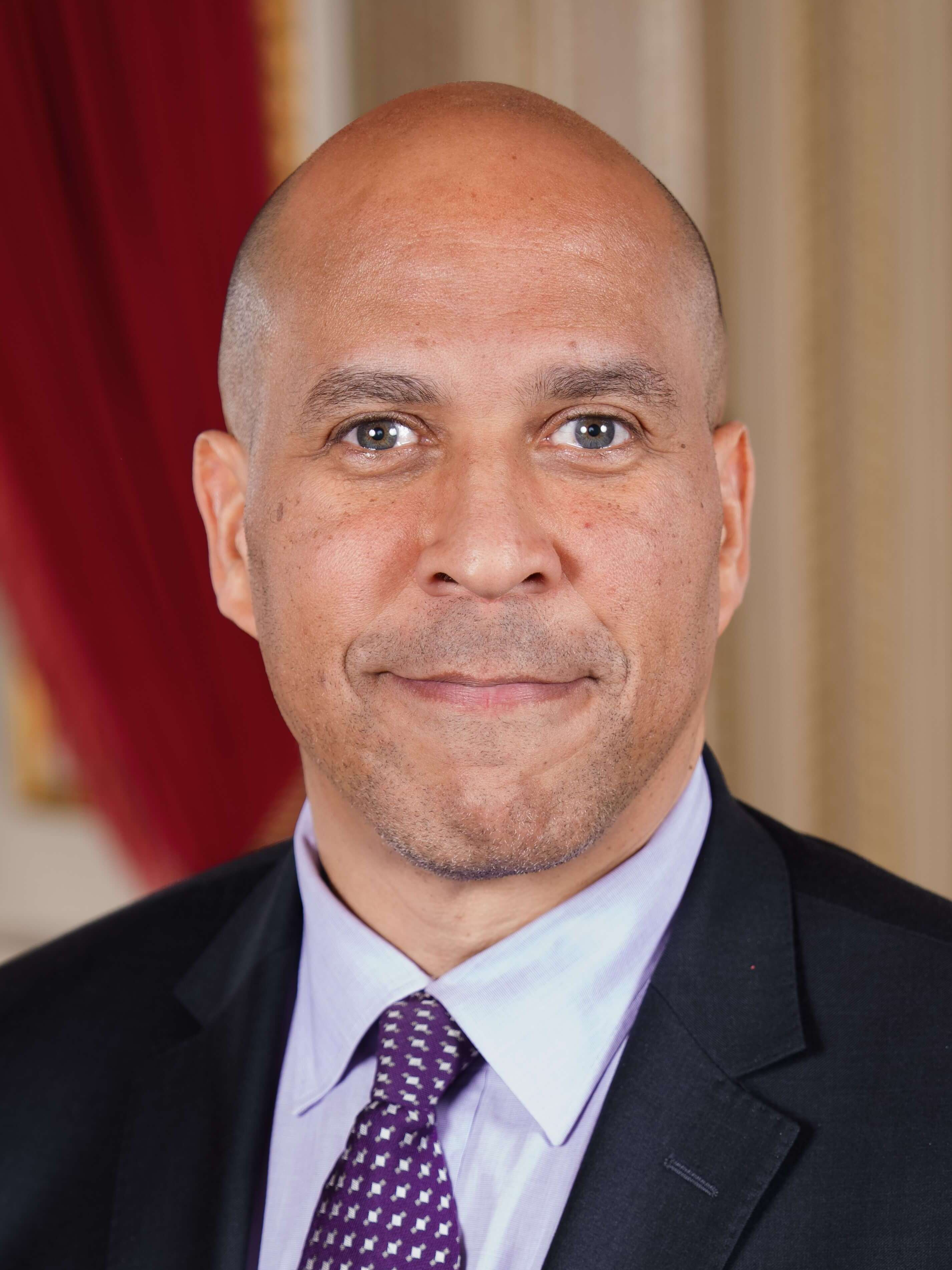

Nominee	Cory Booker	Justin Murphy
Party	Democratic	Republican
Popular vote	1,819,769	1,023,549
Percentage	62.3%	35.1%
- County results Booker: 50–60% 60–70% 70–80% 80–90% Murphy: 40–50% 50–60%
U.S. senator before election
Cory Booker
Democratic
Elected U.S. Senator
Cory Booker
Democratic

Two-term Democrat Cory Booker was reelected in 2020 with 57.2% of the vote and ran for reelection to a third full term. Booker won the Democratic nomination unopposed, as he was the only candidate to submit the required number of signatures to appear on the primary ballot.

On June 2, 2026, former Tabernacle Mayor Justin Murphy, a Navy veteran and attorney, won the Republican nomination with 33% of the vote, defeating physician Robert Lebovics, U.S. Army combat veteran Richard Tabor, and former News 12 reporter Alex Zdan.

Booker was reelected, defeating Murphy in the general election on November 3.

== New Mexico ==
New Mexico election
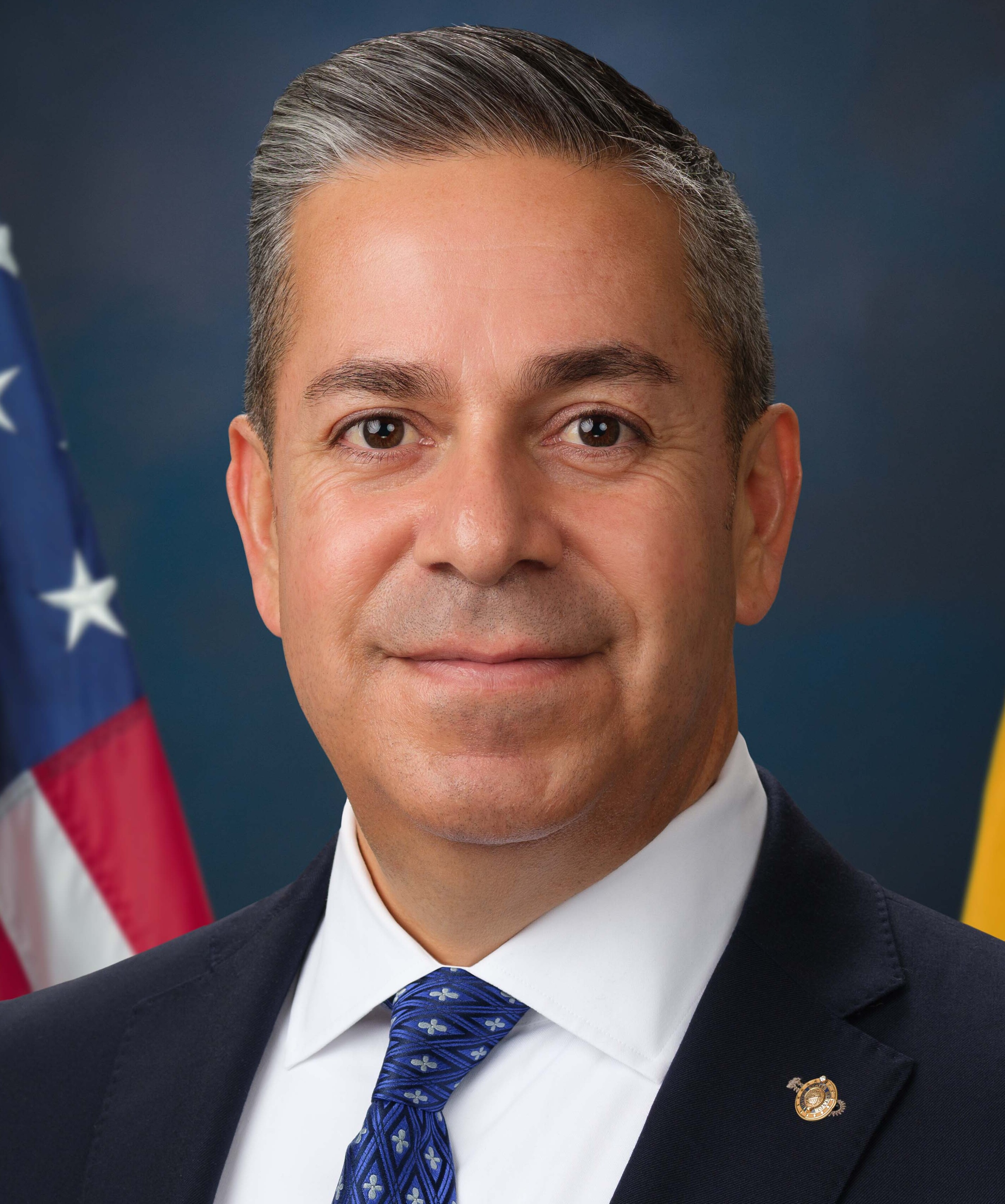

Nominee	Ben Ray Luján	Larry Marker
Party	Democratic	Republican
Popular vote	458,756	266,434
Percentage	63.3%	36.7%
- Luján: 50–60% 60–70% 70–80% 80–90% Marker: 50–60% 60–70%
U.S. senator before election
Ben Ray Luján
Democratic
Elected U.S. Senator
Ben Ray Luján
Democratic

One-term Democrat Ben Ray Luján was elected in 2020 with 51.7% of the vote. On April 23, 2025, Luján announced that he would seek a second term.

Christopher Heuvel, the only Republican to file, was disqualified for failing to meet ballot requirements. Former oil and gas operator Larry Marker subsequently qualified for the Republican primary as a write-in.

Luján was reelected, defeating Marker in the general election on November 3.

== North Carolina ==
North Carolina election

Nominee	Roy Cooper	Michael Whatley
Party	Democratic	Republican
Popular vote	2,467,972	1,643,114
Percentage	58.7%	39.1%
- Cooper: 40–50% 50–60% 60–70% 70–80% 80–90% Whatley: 40–50% 50–60% 60–70% 70–80%
U.S. senator before election
Thom Tillis
Republican
Elected U.S. Senator
Roy Cooper
Democratic

Two-term Republican Thom Tillis, who was narrowly reelected in 2020 with 48.7% of the vote, announced on June 29, 2025, that he would not seek a third term after facing backlash for voting against One Big Beautiful Bill Act, prompting Donald Trump to call for a primary challenger. After Tillis withdrew, Trump endorsed former Republican National Committee chair Michael Whatley, who won the Republican nomination, defeating Don Brown in the March 3 primary.

Former Governor Roy Cooper sought and won the Democratic nomination.

Cooper defeated Whatley in the November 3 general election, flipping the seat from Republican to Democratic.

== Ohio (special) ==
Ohio special election

Nominee	Sherrod Brown	Jon Husted
Party	Democratic	Republican
Popular vote	2,323,001	2,090,390
Percentage	50.09%	45.07%
- Brown: 40–50% 50–60% 60–70% 70–80% Husted: 40–50% 50–60% 60–70% 70–80%
U.S. senator before election
Jon Husted
Republican
Elected U.S. Senator
Sherrod Brown
Democratic

One-term Republican JD Vance was elected in 2022 with 53% of the vote. On January 10, 2025, he resigned from the Senate after being elected Vice President of the United States in 2024. On January 17, Governor Mike DeWine announced that then-Lieutenant Governor Jon Husted would replace Vance in the Senate. Husted ran to serve the remainder of Vance's term.

Former U.S. Senator Sherrod Brown, who was unseated in 2024, defeated IT professional Ron Kincaid in the Democratic primary on May 5, 2026.

Former Libertarian National Committee chair William Redpath ran as a Libertarian. Ohio Libertarians disqualified healthcare consultant Jeffrey Kanter from the Libertarian primary after he submitted hundreds of invalid signatures with his candidate petition.

Brown returned to the Senate after losing his reelection bid in 2024, defeating Husted in the November 3 general election and flipping the seat from Republican to Democratic control.

== Oklahoma ==
Oklahoma election
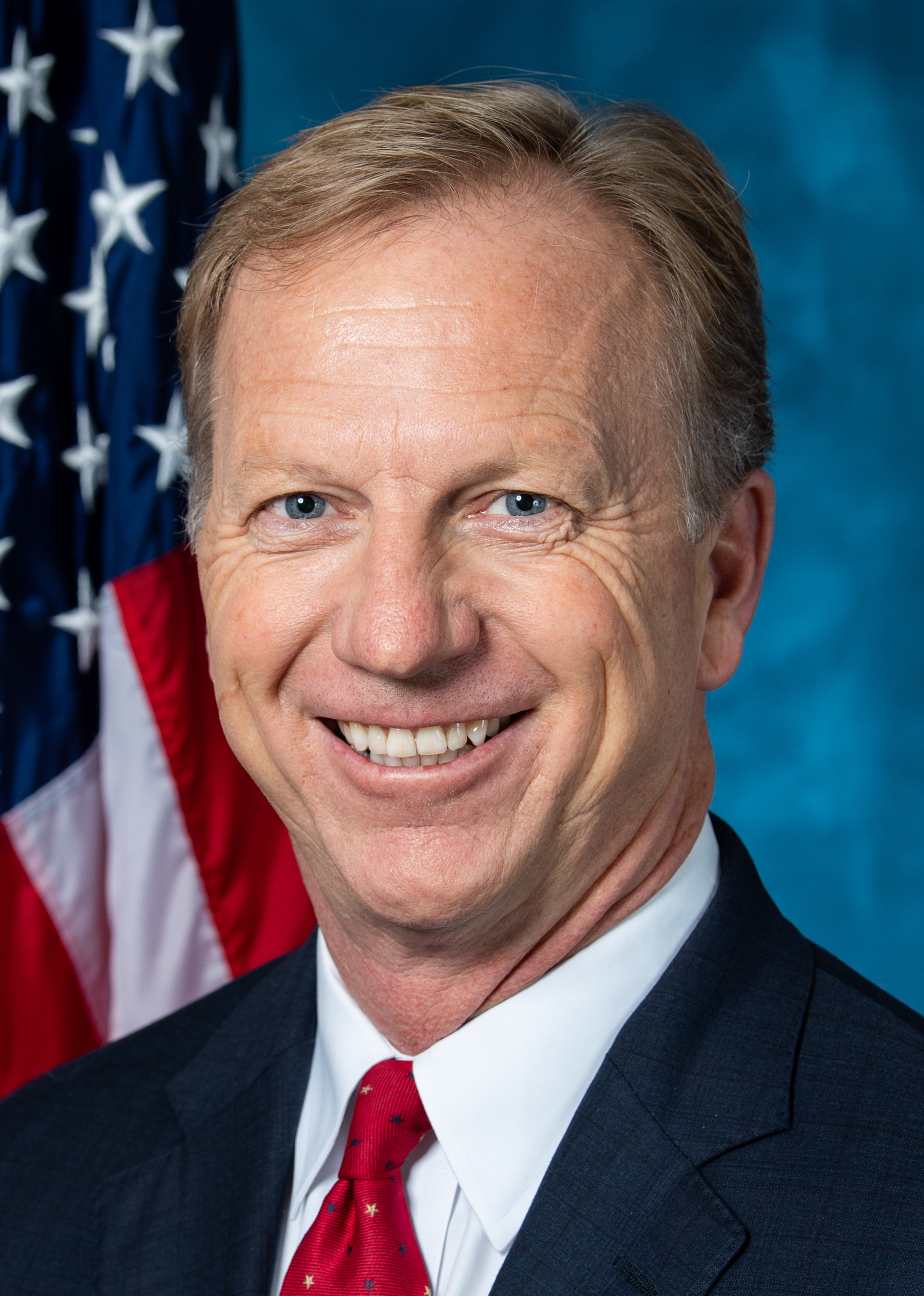

Nominee	Kevin Hern	N'Kiyla Jasmine Thomas
Party	Republican	Democratic
Popular vote	639,860	439,522
Percentage	57.2%	39.3%
- Hern: 40–50% 50–60% 60–70% 70–80% 80–90% >90% Thomas: 40–50% 50–60% 60–70% 70–80% 80–90% >90% Tie: 40–50% 50% No votes
U.S. senator before election
Alan Armstrong
Republican
Elected U.S. Senator
Kevin Hern
Republican

Incumbent Republican Markwayne Mullin won a special election in 2022 with 61.8% of the vote to complete the remainder of the term vacated by Jim Inhofe, who resigned on January 3, 2023, due to declining health and died in 2024.

Mullin initially announced plans to seek his first full term in office, but on March 5, 2026, President Trump announced his nomination of Mullin for Secretary of Homeland Security; the Senate confirmed Mullin on March 23. Governor Kevin Stitt appointed board member and former CEO of Williams Companies Alan Armstrong to replace Mullin in the Senate. Armstrong was sworn in on March 24 and was required to sign an oath stating that he would not run in the 2026 election.

U.S. Representative for Oklahoma's 1st congressional district Kevin Hern won the June 16 Republican primary with 70% of the vote in a crowded field.

In the June 16 Democratic primary, mediator Jim Priest and nurse N'Kiyla "Jasmine" Thomas received the most votes and advanced to an August 25 runoff. Thomas, a member of the Democratic Socialists of America, won the runoff with 61% of the vote.

Entering Wedge Media executive director Ron Meinhardt and pharmacist Curtis Stinnett ran as independents. Sevier White, candidate for Oklahoma's 4th congressional district in 2016, ran as a Libertarian.

Hern defeated Thomas in the general election on November 3.

== Oregon ==
Oregon election
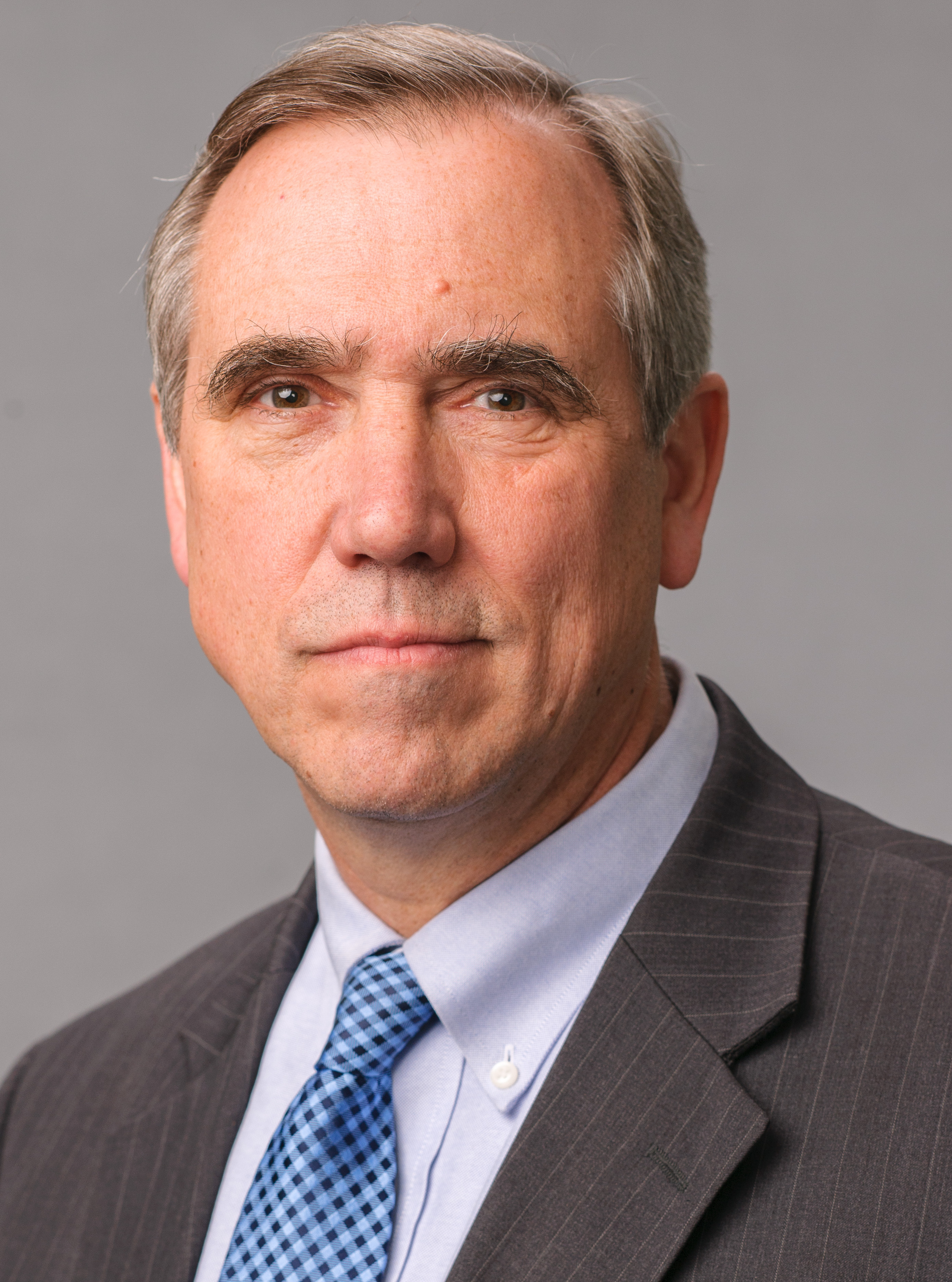

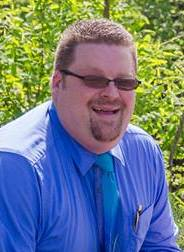
Nominee	Jeff Merkley	David Brock Smith
Party	Democratic	Republican
Popular vote	1,081,831	719,976
Percentage	58.1%	38.7%
- Merkley: 40–50% 50–60% 60–70% 80–90% Smith: 40–50% 50–60% 60–70% 70–80%
U.S. senator before election
Jeff Merkley
Democratic
Elected U.S. senator
Jeff Merkley
Democratic

Three-term Democrat Jeff Merkley was reelected in 2020 with 56.9% of the vote and ran for reelection. He defeated retired electrical engineer Paul D. Wells in the Democratic primary on May 19, 2026.

State Senator David Brock Smith, won the Republican primary that was held on May 19, 2026, defeating a crowded field of candidates, with former Linn County Republican Party chair Jo Rae Perkins finishing second.

Merkley was reelected, defeating Brock Smith in the general election on November 3.

== Rhode Island ==
Rhode Island election
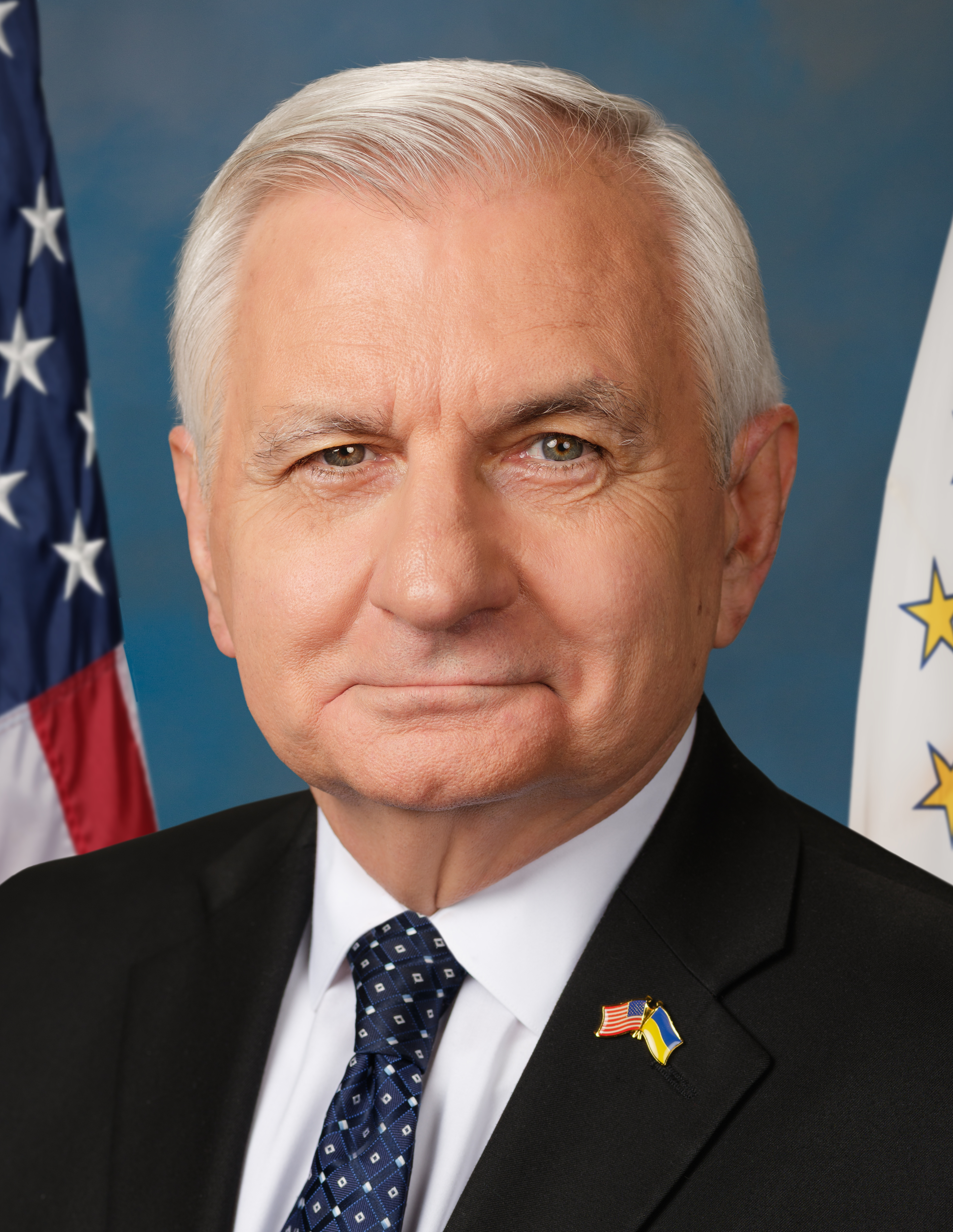

Nominee	Jack Reed	Raymond McKay
Party	Democratic	Republican
Popular vote	240,069	105,346
Percentage	66.8%	29.3%
- County results Reed: 50–60% 60–70% 70–80%
U.S. senator before election
Jack Reed
Democratic
Elected U.S. senator
Jack Reed
Democratic

Five-term Democrat Jack Reed was reelected in 2020 with 66.5% of the vote and ran for a sixth term. He won the Democratic primary on September 9, defeating elder care worker Connor Burbridge and physician Luis Daniel Muñoz.

Former Rhode Island Republican Party official Raymond McKay was the Republican nominee.

Reed was reelected, defeating McKay in the general election on November 3.

== South Carolina ==
South Carolina election

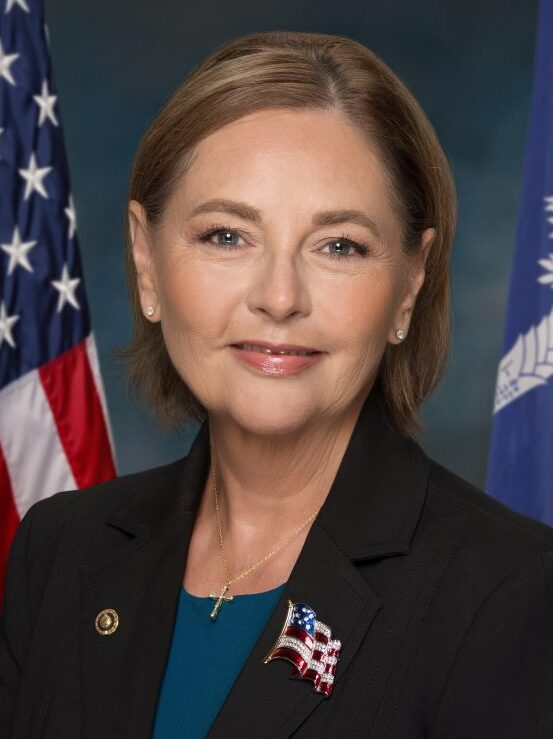
Nominee	Annie Andrews	Darline Graham
Party	Democratic	Republican
Popular vote	1,044,001	952,191
Percentage	51.1%	46.6%
- Andrews: 40–50% 50–60% 60–70% 70–80% 80–90% >90% Graham: 40–50% 50–60% 60–70% 70–80% 80–90% >90% Tie: 50% No data
U.S. senator before election
Darline Graham
Republican
Elected U.S. senator
Annie Andrews
Democratic

Four-term Republican Lindsey Graham was reelected in 2020 with 54.4% of the vote and was seeking a fifth term. He won the June 9 Republican primary with 57% of the vote, but died in office on July 11. Governor Henry McMaster appointed Lindsey Graham's sister, Darline Graham, to serve the remainder of his term. She subsequently sought a full term. In the August 11 special Republican primary, Darline Graham and U.S. Representative Ralph Norman advanced to an August 25 runoff, which Graham won with 52% of the vote to Norman's 48%.

Pediatrician Annie Andrews won the Democratic primary with 61% of the vote.

The South Carolina Libertarian Party nominee was Kasie Whitener, a novelist, business consultant, radio host and Clinical Assistant Professor of Entrepreneurship at the University of South Carolina. The Constitution Party nominee was Mark Hackett, a house painter. Both candidates were nominated by their respective party conventions. 2022 US Senate candidate Catherine Fleming Bruce ran as a write-in candidate.

Andrews defeated Darline Graham in the general election on November 3, flipping the seat from Republican to Democratic.

== South Dakota ==
South Dakota election
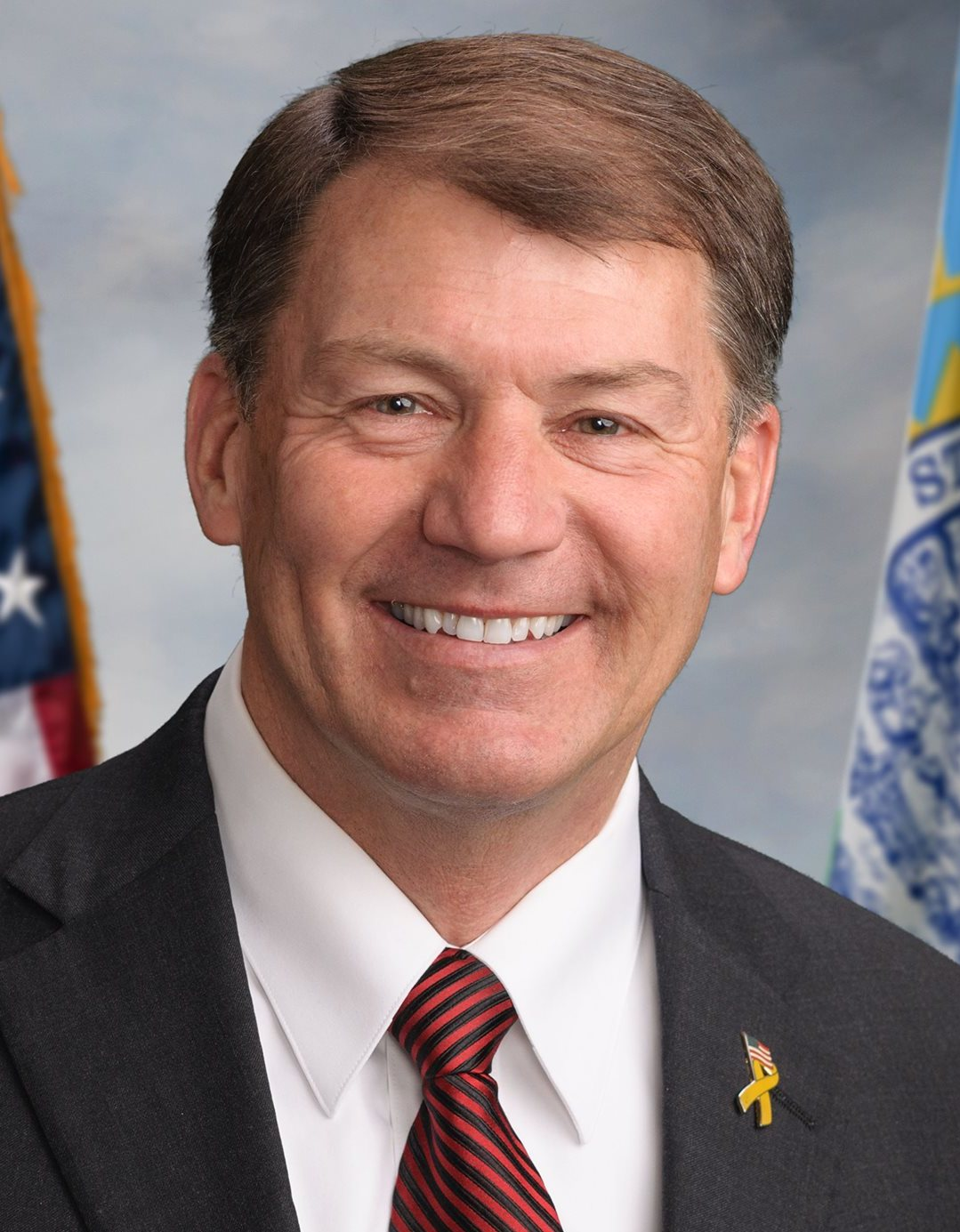

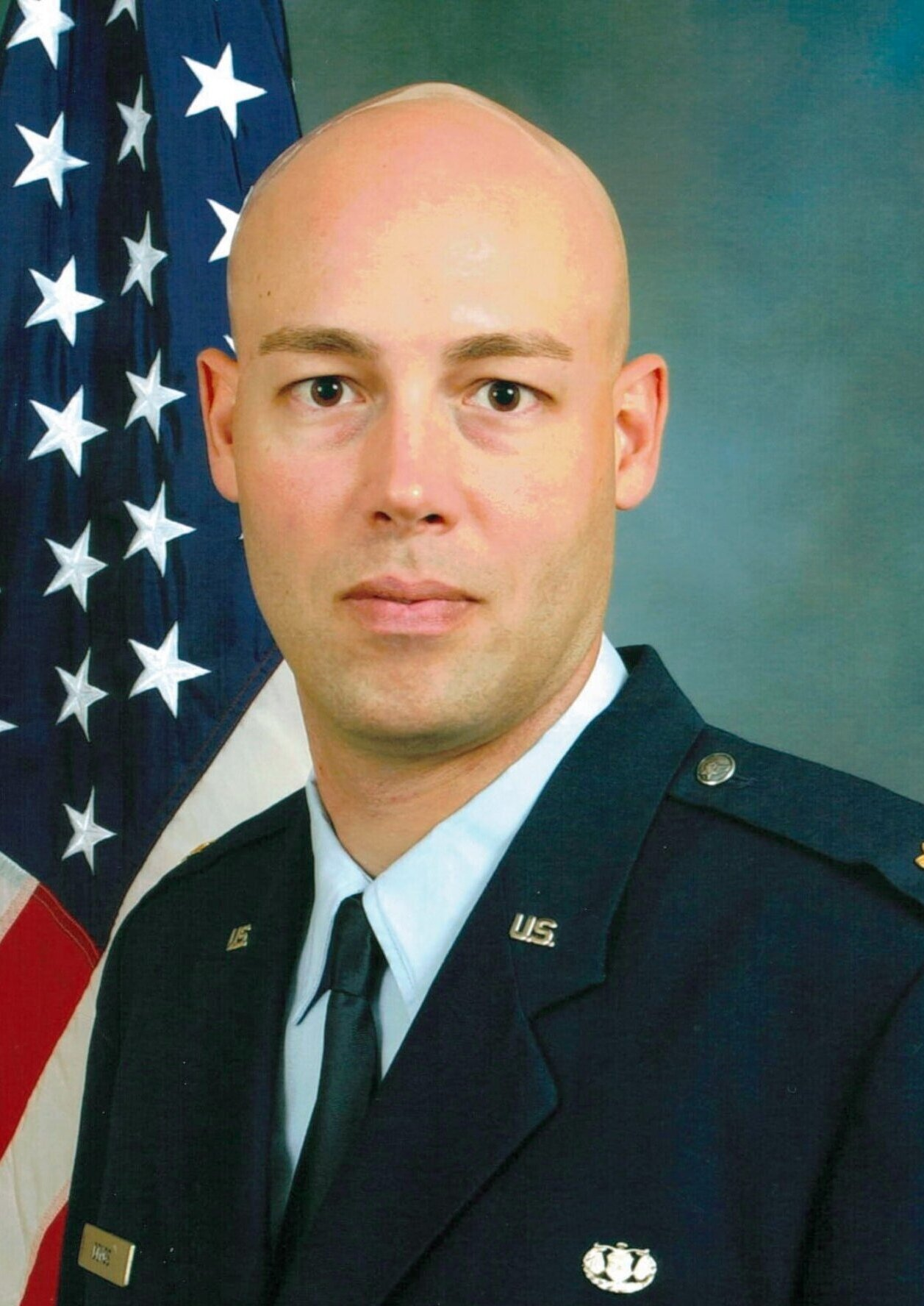
Nominee	Mike Rounds	Brian Bengs
Party	Republican	Independent
Popular vote	184,590	120,513
Percentage	60.50%	39.50%
- County results Rounds: 50–60% 60–70% 70–80% 80–90% Bengs: 50–60% 60–70% 70–80% 80–90%
U.S. senator before election
Mike Rounds
Republican
Elected U.S. senator
Mike Rounds
Republican

Two-term Republican Mike Rounds, who was reelected in 2020 with 65.7% of the vote, ran for a third term. Rounds easily defeated Navy veteran and businessman Justin McNeil in the June 2 primary to win the Republican nomination.

Businessman and former South Dakota state trooper Julian Beaudion was the Democratic nominee, but withdrew on August 4.

Brian Bengs, a U.S. Navy and Air Force veteran, former Northern State University political science professor, and the Democratic nominee for U.S. Senate in 2022, has announced his candidacy as an independent.

Rounds was reelected, defeating Bengs in the general election on November 3.

== Tennessee ==
Tennessee election
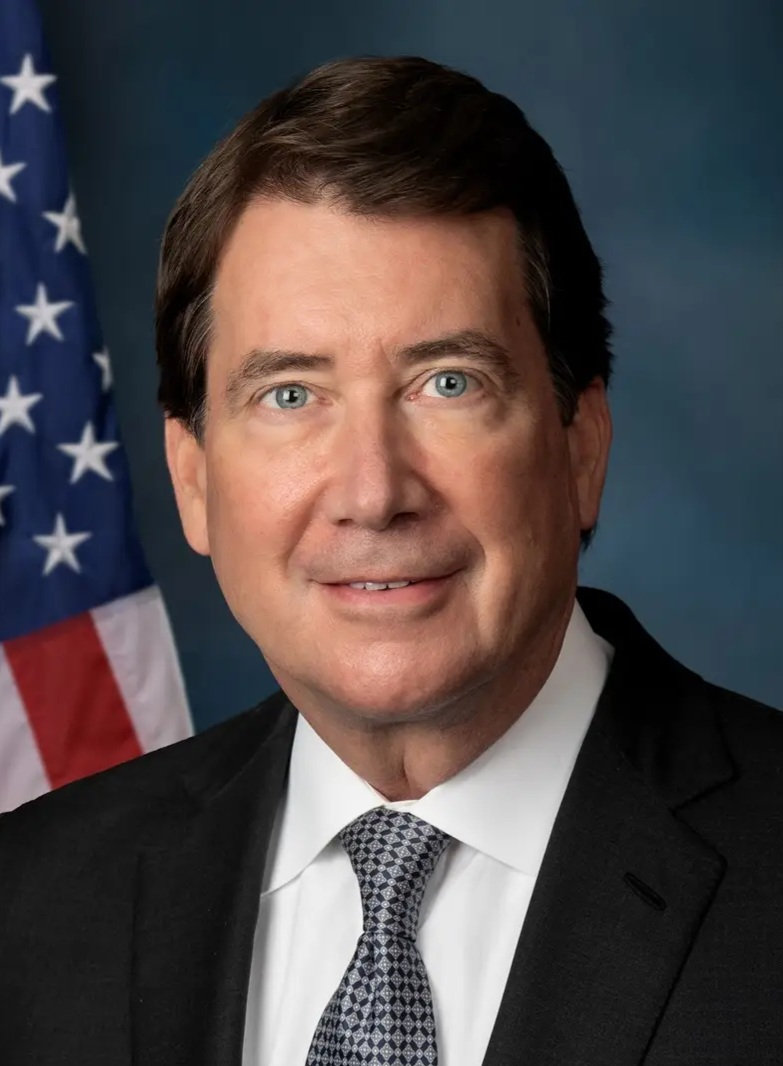

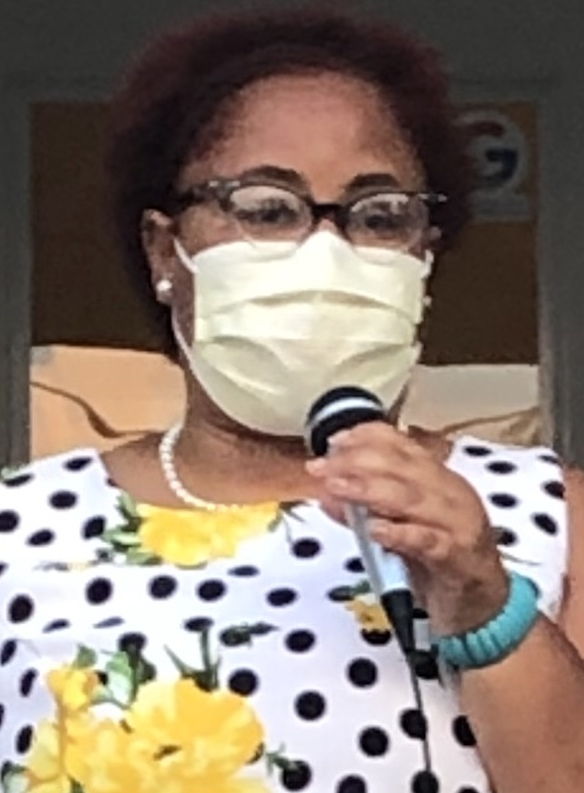
Nominee	Bill Hagerty	Marquita Bradshaw
Party	Republican	Democratic
Popular vote	1,138,457	886,974
Percentage	55.1%	42.9%
- County results Hagerty: 50–60% 60–70% 70–80% 80–90% Bradshaw: 40–50% 50–60% 60–70% 70–80%
U.S. senator before election
Bill Hagerty
Republican
Elected U.S. Senator
Bill Hagerty
Republican

Republican Bill Hagerty was elected in 2020 with 62.2% of the vote and ran for reelection. Hagerty became the Republican nominee unopposed after no other Republicans qualified for the primary ballot.

Consultant Marquita Bradshaw won the Democratic nomination on August 6.

Hagerty was reelected, defeating Bradshaw in the general election on November 3.

== Texas ==
Texas election
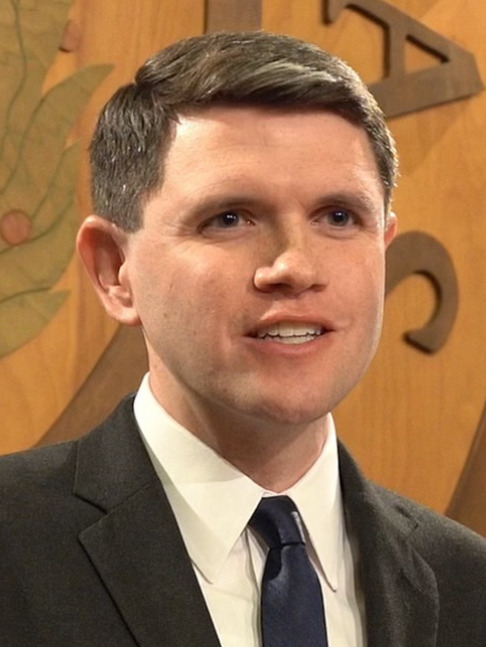

Nominee	James Talarico	Ken Paxton
Party	Democratic	Republican
Popular vote	5,447,080	4,250,704
Percentage	55.06%	42.97%
- Talarico: 40–50% 50–60% 60–70% 70–80% Paxton: 40–50% 50–60% 60–70% 70–80% 80–90% >90%
U.S. senator before election
John Cornyn
Republican
Elected U.S. Senator
James Talarico
Democratic

Four-term Republican John Cornyn was reelected in 2020 with 53.5% of the vote, and ran for a fifth term in 2026.

Cornyn and state Attorney General Ken Paxton ran in the Republican primary on March 3. Since neither received more than 50% of the vote, they advanced to a runoff election held on May 26. U.S. Representative for the 38th congressional district Wesley Hunt challenged Paxton and Cornyn, but lost the primary. On May 19, both Hunt and President Trump endorsed Paxton. Paxton defeated Cornyn in the runoff by a landslide and became the Republican nominee.

State Representative James Talarico was the Democratic nominee, having defeated U.S. Representative Jasmine Crockett in the primary.

Talarico defeated Paxton in the general election on November 3, flipping the seat from Republican to Democratic.

== Virginia ==
Virginia election
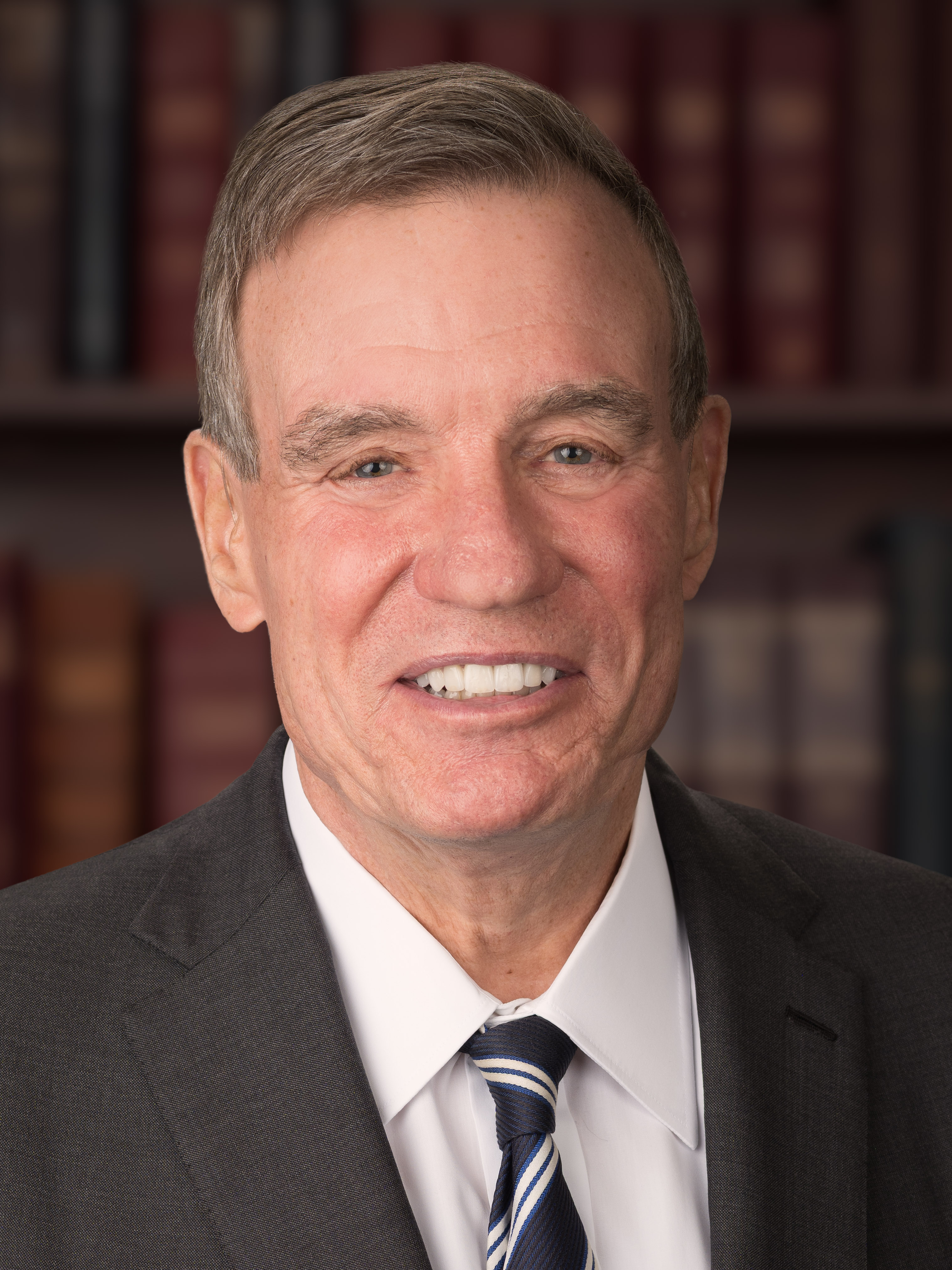

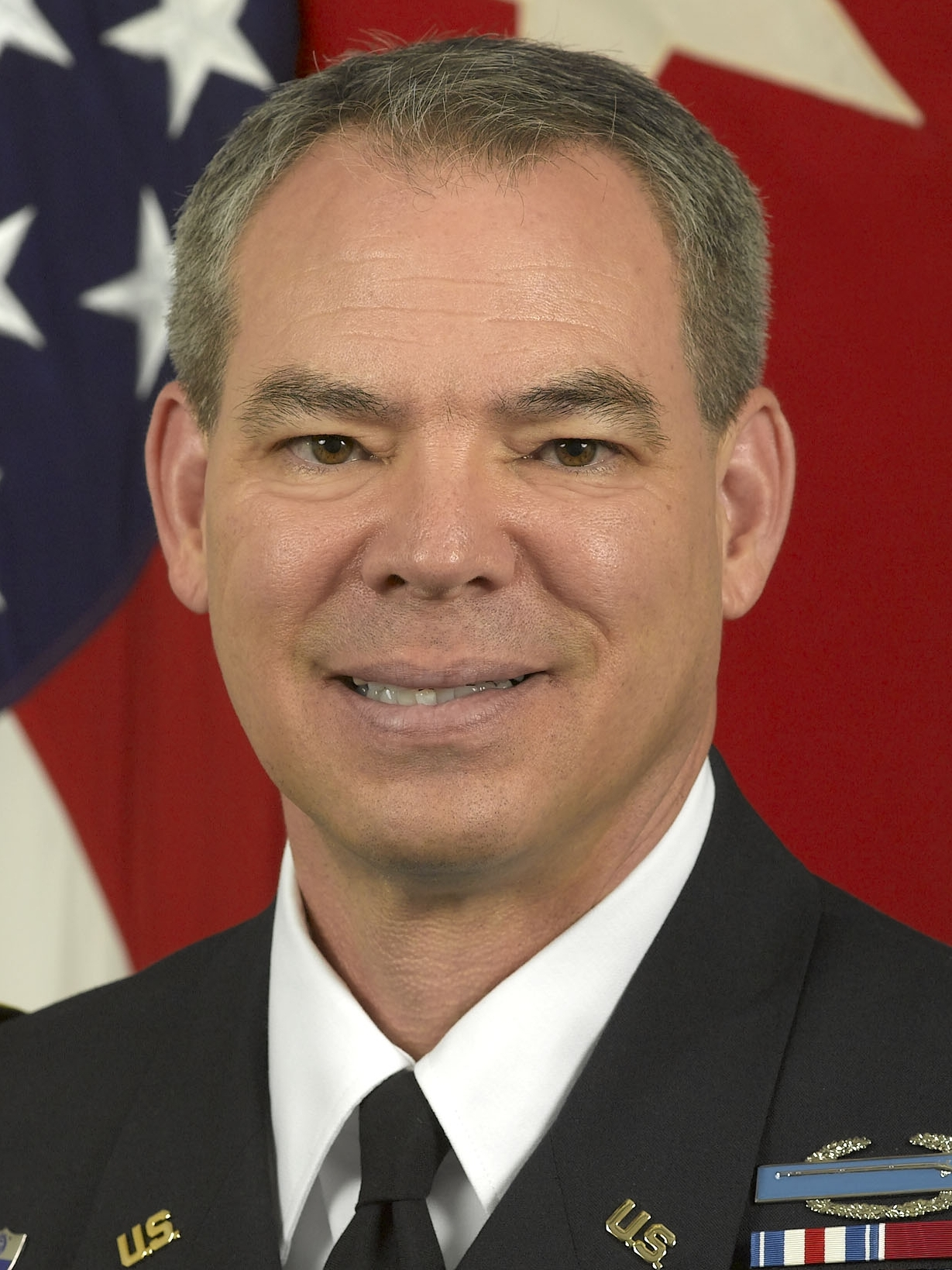
Nominee	Mark Warner	Bert Mizusawa
Party	Democratic	Republican
Popular vote	2,251,628	1,393,710
Percentage	61.60%	38.13%
- Warner: 50–60% 60–70% 70–80% 80–90% >90% Mizusawa: 50–60% 60–70% 70–80%
U.S. senator before election
Mark Warner
Democratic
Elected U.S. Senator
Mark Warner
Democratic

Three-term Democrat Mark Warner was reelected in 2020 with 56% of the vote and ran for reelection. As the only person to submit the necessary number of signatures to appear on the primary ballot, Warner was the Democratic nominee.

Retired United States Army Major General Bert Mizusawa, who previously ran for U.S. Senate in 2018 and Virginia's 2nd congressional district in 2010, won the Republican nomination over Certified Public Accountant Kim Farrington and U.S. Marine Corps Reserve Colonel David Williams.

Warner was reelected, defeating Mizusawa in the general election on November 3.

== West Virginia ==
West Virginia election
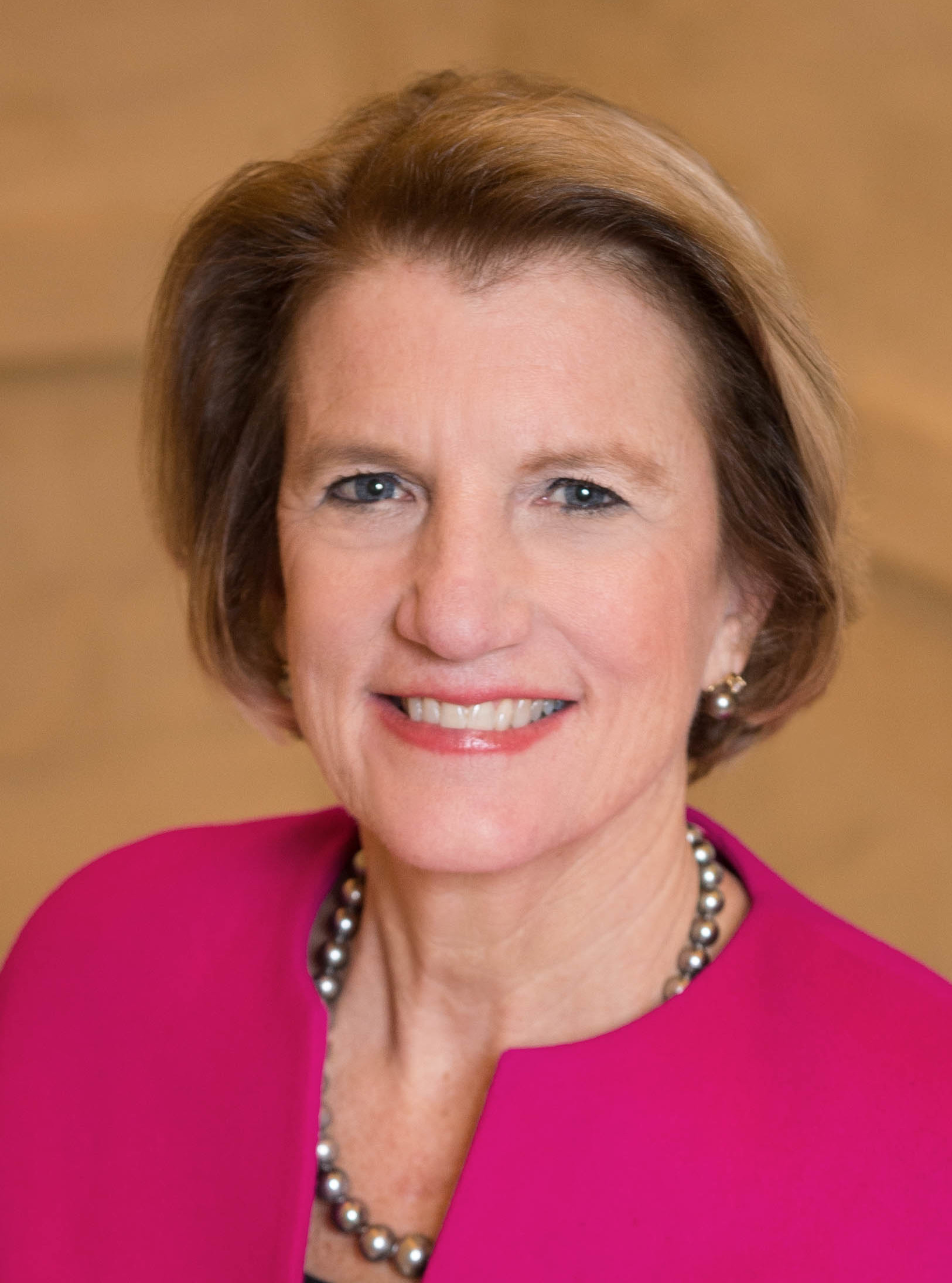

Nominee	Shelley Moore Capito	Rachel Fetty Anderson
Party	Republican	Democratic
Popular vote	266,067	172,922
Percentage	58.3%	37.9%
- Capito: 40–50% 50–60% 60–70% 70–80% 80–90% Anderson: 40–50% 50–60%
U.S. senator before election
Shelley Moore Capito
Republican
Elected U.S. Senator
Shelley Moore Capito
Republican

Two-term Republican Shelley Moore Capito was reelected in 2020 with 70.3% of the vote and is ran for reelection to a third term. She won the Republican primary on May 12.

Former Morgantown City Councilwoman Rachel Fetty Anderson won the Democratic primary on May 12, 2026.

Moore Capito was reelected, defeating Fetty Anderson in the general election on November 3.

== Wyoming ==
Wyoming election
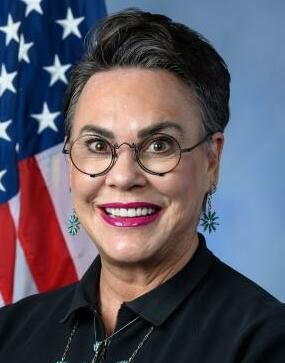

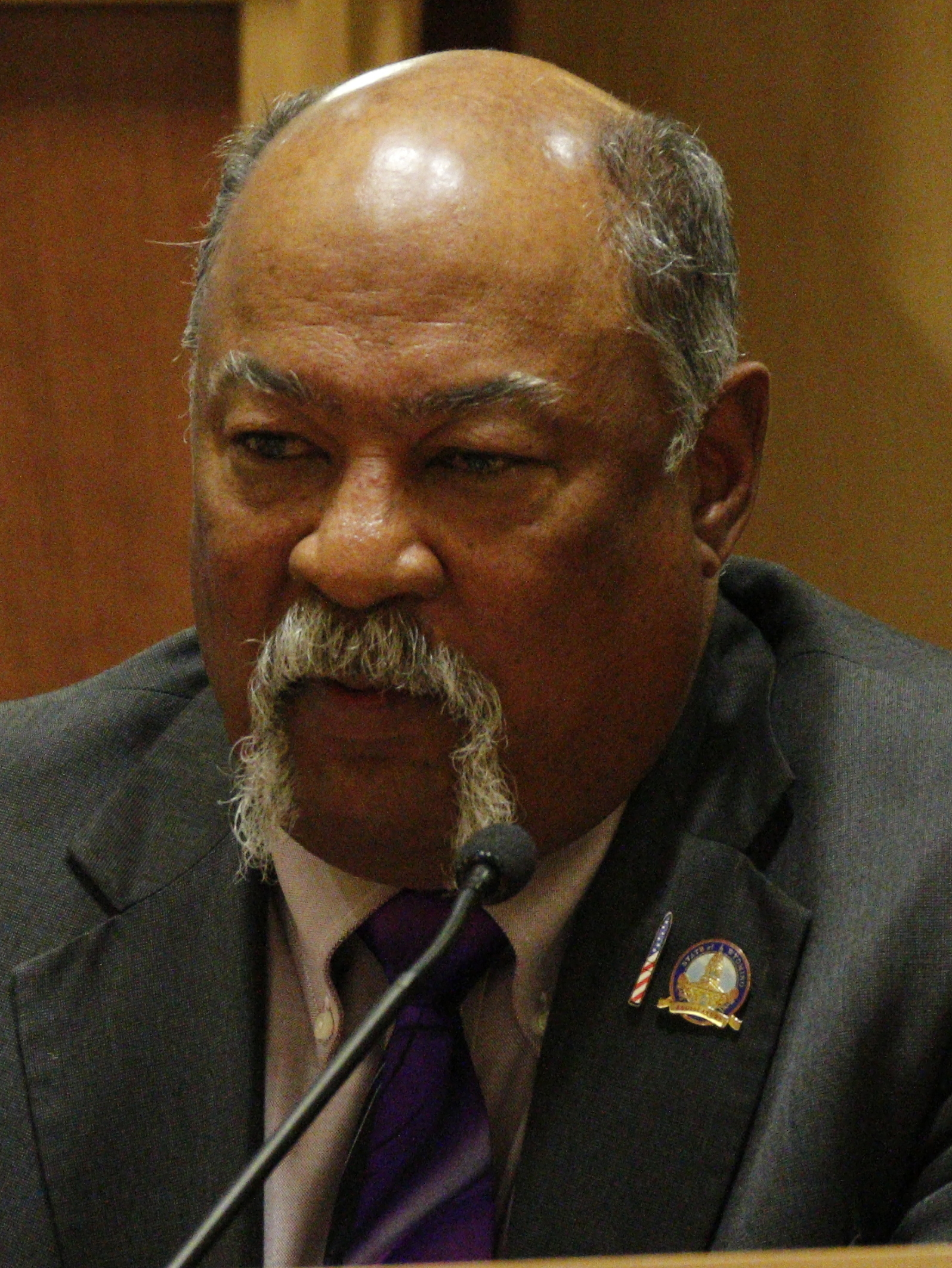
Nominee	Harriet Hageman	James W. Byrd
Party	Republican	Democratic
Popular vote	122,174	65,105
Percentage	64.9%	34.6%
- County results Hageman: 50–60% 60–70% 70–80% 80–90% Byrd: 50–60% 70–80%
U.S. senator before election
Cynthia Lummis
Republican
Elected U.S. Senator
Harriet Hageman
Republican

One-term Republican Cynthia Lummis was elected in 2020 with 72.8% of the vote and did not seek reelection.

U.S. Representative Harriet Hageman defeated Wyoming Army National Guard veteran Jimmy Skovgard for the Republican nomination on August 18, 2026.

Former state Representative James W. Byrd defeated landscaper Billy Benavidez for the Democratic nomination on August 18, 2026.

Hageman defeated Byrd in the general election on November 3.

== See also ==
- 2026 United States elections
  - 2026 United States House of Representatives elections
  - 2026 United States gubernatorial elections
- Opinion polling on the second Trump presidency
