= 1996 United States gubernatorial elections =

- November 5, 1996

13 governorships 11 states; 2 territories
	Majority party	Minority party
Party	Republican	Democratic
Seats before	32 (Note: Mike Huckabee (R) succeeded Arkansas Governor Jim Guy Tucker (D) after the latter resigned due to convictions for one count of conspiracy and one count of mail fraud.)	17
Seats after	32	17
Seat change	Steady	Steady
Popular vote	5,550,893	6,315,320
Percentage	46.07%	52.42%
Seats up	4	7
Seats won	4	7
- Map of the results Democratic gain Democratic hold Republican gain Republican hold New Progressive hold Nonpartisan; No election

United States gubernatorial elections were held on November 5, 1996, in 11 states and two territories. Going into the elections, seven of the seats were held by Democrats and four by Republicans. Democrats picked up the open seat in New Hampshire, and Republicans picked up the open seat in West Virginia, for no net change in the partisan balance of power. These elections coincided with the presidential election.

== Election results ==
=== States ===
State	Incumbent	Party	First elected	Result	Candidates
Delaware	Tom Carper	Democratic	1992	Incumbent re-elected.	✓ Tom Carper (Democratic) 69.5%; Janet Rzewnicki (Republican) 30.5%
Indiana	Evan Bayh	Democratic	1988	Incumbent term-limited. New governor elected. Democratic hold.	✓ Frank O'Bannon (Democratic) 51.5%; Stephen Goldsmith (Republican) 46.8%; Steve Dillon (Libertarian) 1.7%
Missouri	Mel Carnahan	Democratic	1992	Incumbent re-elected.	✓ Mel Carnahan (Democratic) 57.2%; Margaret B. Kelly (Republican) 40.4%; J. Mark Oglesby (Libertarian) 2.4%
Montana	Marc Racicot	Republican	1992	Incumbent re-elected.	✓ Marc Racicot (Republican) 79.2%; Judy Jacobson (Democratic) 20.8%
New Hampshire	Steve Merrill	Republican	1992	Incumbent retired. New governor elected. Democratic gain.	✓ Jeanne Shaheen (Democratic) 57.2%; Ovide Lamontagne (Republican) 39.5%
North Carolina	Jim Hunt	Democratic	1976; 1984 (term-limited); 1992	Incumbent re-elected.	✓ Jim Hunt (Democratic) 56.0%; Robin Hayes (Republican) 42.8%
North Dakota	Ed Schafer	Republican	1992	Incumbent re-elected.	✓ Ed Schafer (Republican) 66.2%; Lee Kaldor (Democratic) 33.8%
Utah	Mike Leavitt	Republican	1992	Incumbent re-elected.	✓ Mike Leavitt (Republican) 75.0%; Jim Bradley (Democratic) 23.3%
Vermont	Howard Dean	Democratic	1991 (Note: Dean took office after his predecessor (Richard Snelling) died. He was subsequently elected in the 1992 Vermont gubernatorial election.)	Incumbent re-elected.	✓ Howard Dean (Democratic) 70.5%; John L. Gropper (Republican) 22.5%; Mary Alice Herbert (Liberty Union) 1.6%; Dennis Lane (Grassroots) 1.4%; Bill Brunelle (Natural Law) 1.3%; August St. John (Independent) 1.3%; Neil Randall (Libertarian) 1.2%
Washington	Mike Lowry	Democratic	1992	Incumbent retired. New governor elected. Democratic hold.	✓ Gary Locke (Democratic) 58.0%; Ellen Craswell (Republican) 42.0%
West Virginia	Gaston Caperton	Democratic	1988	Incumbent term-limited. New governor elected. Republican gain.	✓ Cecil Underwood (Republican) 51.6%; Charlotte Pritt (Democratic) 45.8%; Wallace Johnson (Libertarian) 2.6%

=== Territories ===
Territory	Incumbent	Party	First elected	Result	Candidates
American Samoa	A. P. Lutali	Democratic	1992	Incumbent retired. New governor elected. Democratic hold.	✓ Tauese Sunia (Democratic) 51.0%; L. Peter Reid (Independent) 49.0%
Puerto Rico	Pedro Rosselló	New Progressive	1992	Incumbent re-elected.	✓ Pedro Rosselló (PNP) 51.4%; Héctor Luis Acevedo (PPD) 44.7%; David Noriega Rodríguez (PIP) 3.8%

== Closest races ==
States where the margin of victory was under 5%:

1. American Samoa, 2.0%
2. Indiana, 4.7%

States where the margin of victory was under 10%:

1. West Virginia, 5.8%
2. Puerto Rico, 6.7%

== Delaware ==
1996 Delaware gubernatorial election
- November 5, 1996
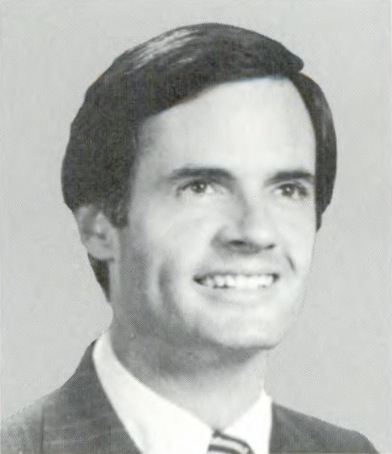

Nominee	Tom Carper	Janet Rzewnicki
Party	Democratic	Republican
Running mate	Ruth Ann Minner	Sherman N. Miller
Popular vote	188,300	82,564
Percentage	69.5%	30.5%
- Carper: 50–60% 60–70% 70–80% 80–90% >90%
Governor before election
Tom Carper
Democratic
Elected Governor
Tom Carper
Democratic

The 1996 Delaware gubernatorial election was held on November 5, 1996, to elect the governor of the state of Delaware. Incumbent governor Thomas Carper, the Democratic nominee, was re-elected to his second and final term in a landslide over Republican nominee and Delaware State Treasurer Janet Rzewnicki. Both were unopposed in their respective primaries. Tom Carper became the first Democratic governor in state history to win 2 consecutive terms.

== Indiana ==
1996 Indiana gubernatorial election
- November 5, 1996
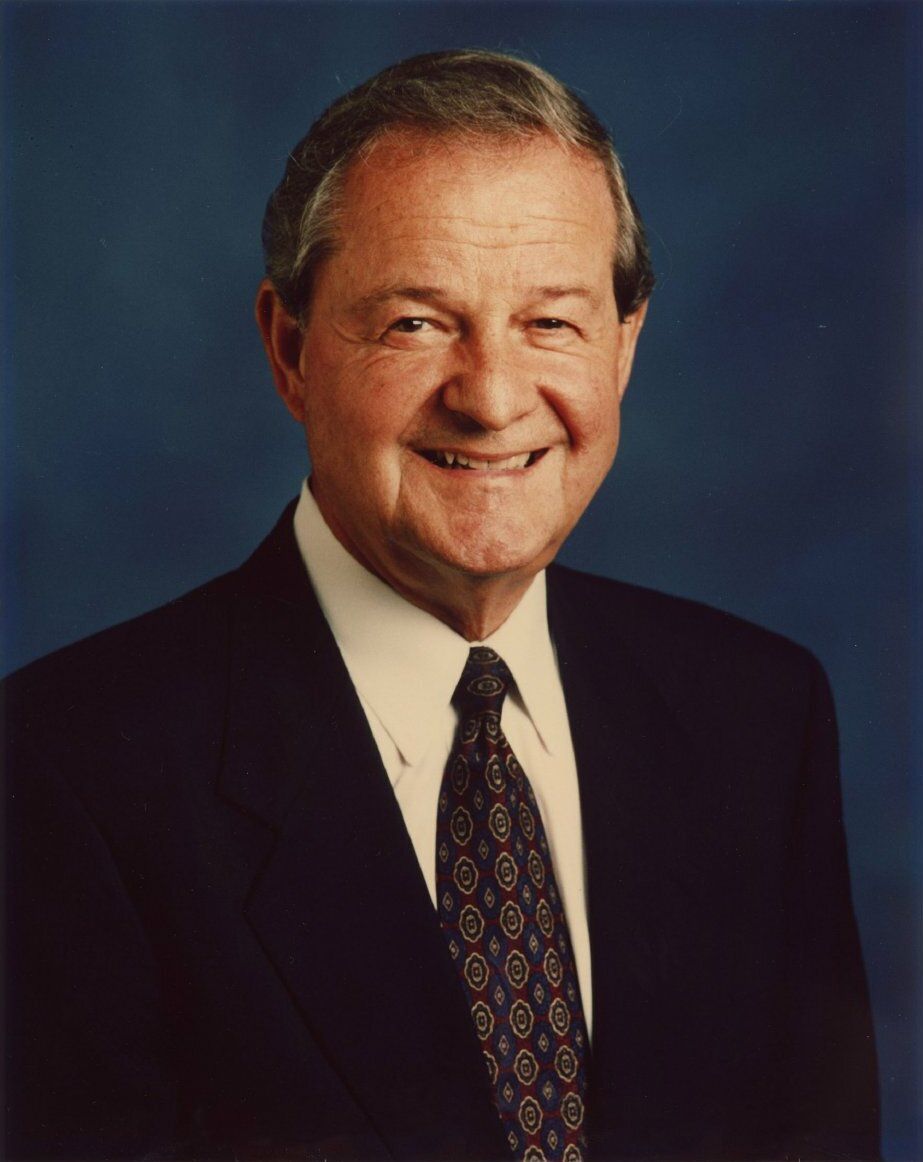

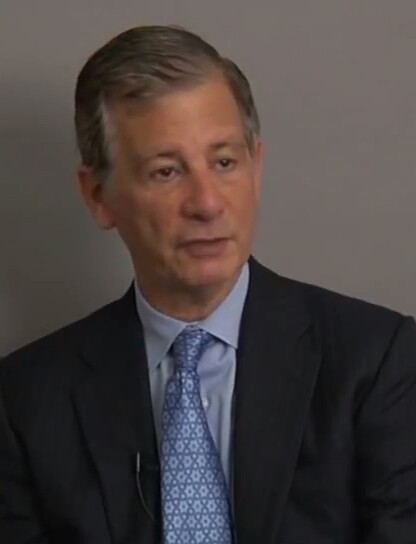
Nominee	Frank O'Bannon	Steve Goldsmith
Party	Democratic	Republican
Running mate	Joe Kernan	George Witwer
Popular vote	1,087,128	986,982
Percentage	51.5%	46.8%
- County results O'Bannon: 40–50% 50–60% 60–70% 70–80% Goldsmith: 40–50% 50–60% 60–70%
Governor before election
Evan Bayh
Democratic
Elected Governor
Frank O'Bannon
Democratic

The 1996 Indiana gubernatorial Election was held on November 5, 1996, alongside the election of both houses of the Indiana General Assembly. Incumbent Governor Evan Bayh, a Democrat, was ineligible to run for a third consecutive term due to term limits established by the Indiana Constitution. He was succeeded by Lt. Governor Frank O'Bannon, who won election over Republican Stephen Goldsmith with 52% of the vote.

== Missouri ==
1996 Missouri gubernatorial election
- November 5, 1996
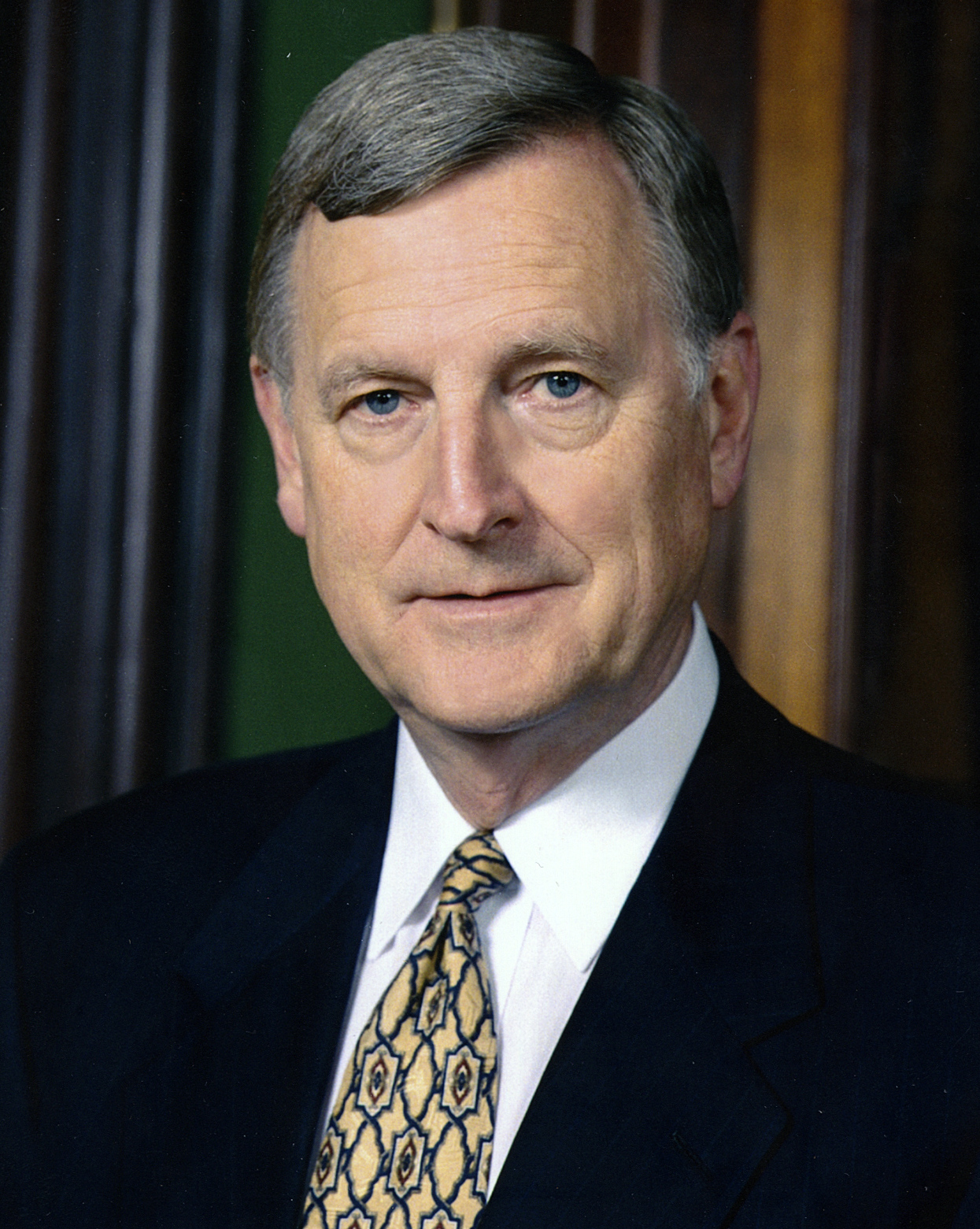

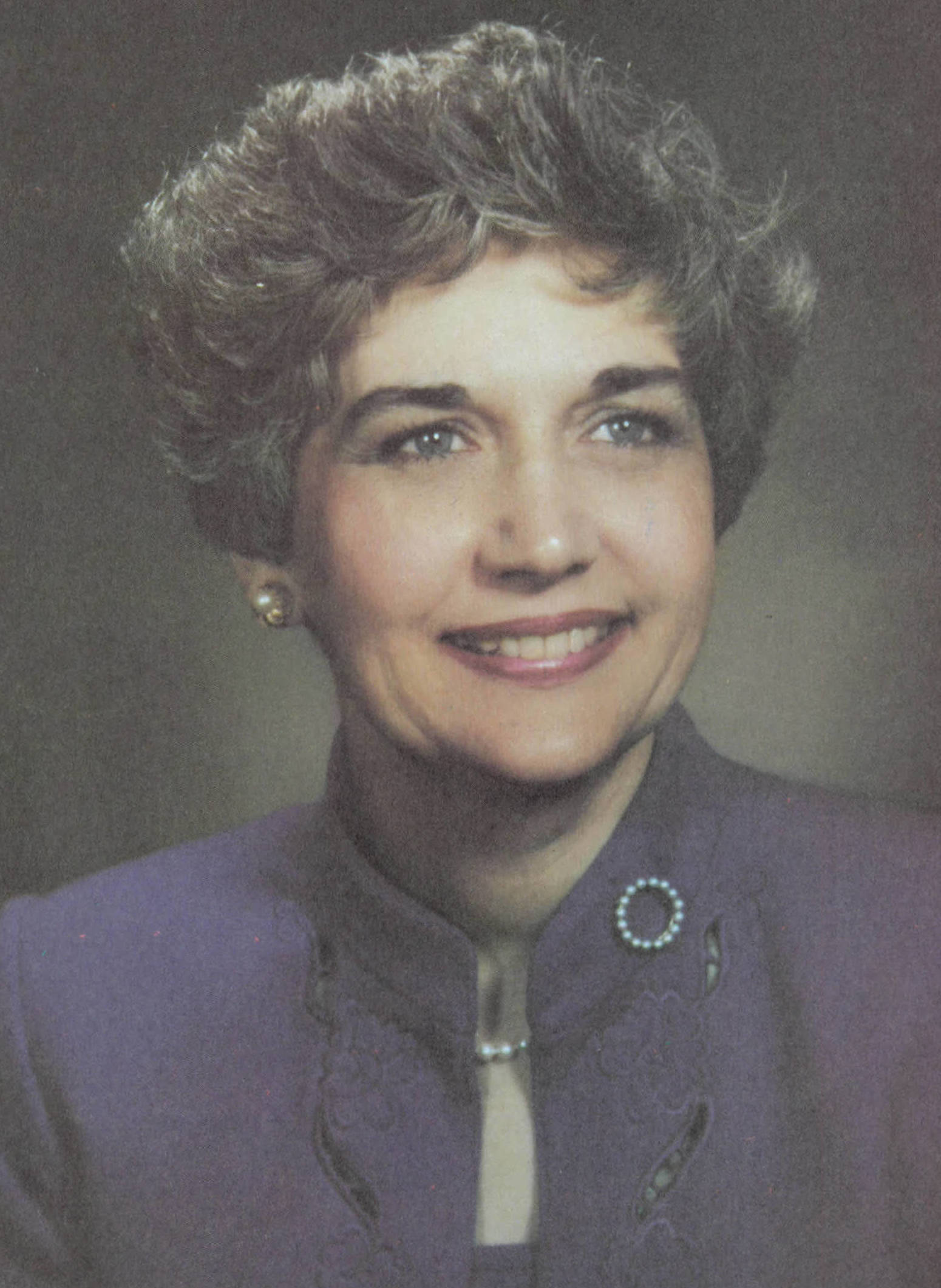
Nominee	Mel Carnahan	Margaret B. Kelly
Party	Democratic	Republican
Popular vote	1,224,801	866,268
Percentage	57.17%	40.43%
- County results Carnahan: 40-50% 50–60% 60–70% 70–80% Kelly: 40–50% 50–60% 60–70%
Governor before election
Mel Carnahan
Democratic
Elected Governor
Mel Carnahan
Democratic

The 1996 Missouri gubernatorial election was held on November 5, 1996, and resulted in a victory for the Democratic nominee, incumbent Governor Mel Carnahan, over the Republican candidate, State Auditor Margaret B. Kelly, and Libertarian J. Mark Oglesby.

Governor Carnahan died in a plane crash on October 16, 2000, near the end of this term, and was replaced by Lt. Governor Roger B. Wilson.

== Montana ==
1996 Montana gubernatorial election
- November 5, 1996
- Turnout: 70.60%▼8.30
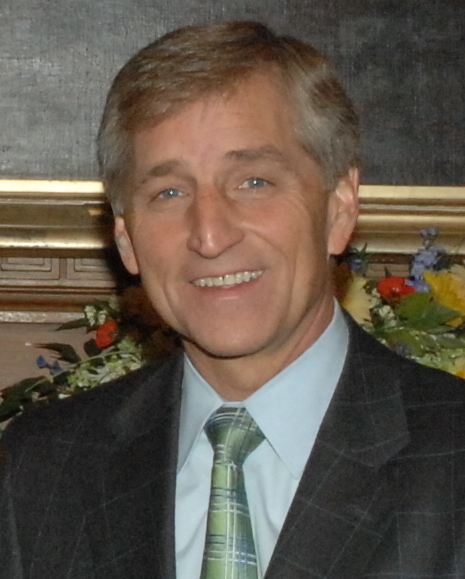

Nominee	Marc Racicot	Judy Jacobson (replacing Chet Blaylock)
Party	Republican	Democratic
Running mate	Judy Martz	Judy Jacobson
Popular vote	320,768	84,407
Percentage	79.2%	20.8%
- County results Racicot: 50–60% 60–70% 70–80% 80–90%
Governor before election
Marc Racicot
Republican
Elected Governor
Marc Racicot
Republican

The 1996 Montana gubernatorial election took place on November 5, 1996. Incumbent Governor of Montana Marc Racicot, who was first elected in 1992, ran for re-election. After winning the Republican primary against a conservative activist, he moved on to the general election, where he was set to face Chet Blaylock, a former State Senator and the Democratic nominee. However, on October 23, 1996, Blaylock died of a heart attack, and the Montana Democratic Party selected his running mate, State Senator Judy Jacobson, to replace him, and she therefore became both the gubernatorial nominee and the lieutenant gubernatorial nominee. Ultimately, Racicot defeated Jacobson in a landslide to win re-election to his second and final term as governor.

As of 2026, this is the last time that the winning gubernatorial nominee carried all counties in Montana. This election was the first time since 1956 and the last until 2024 when an incumbent Republican Governor of Montana was re-elected.

== New Hampshire ==
1996 New Hampshire gubernatorial election
- November 5, 1996
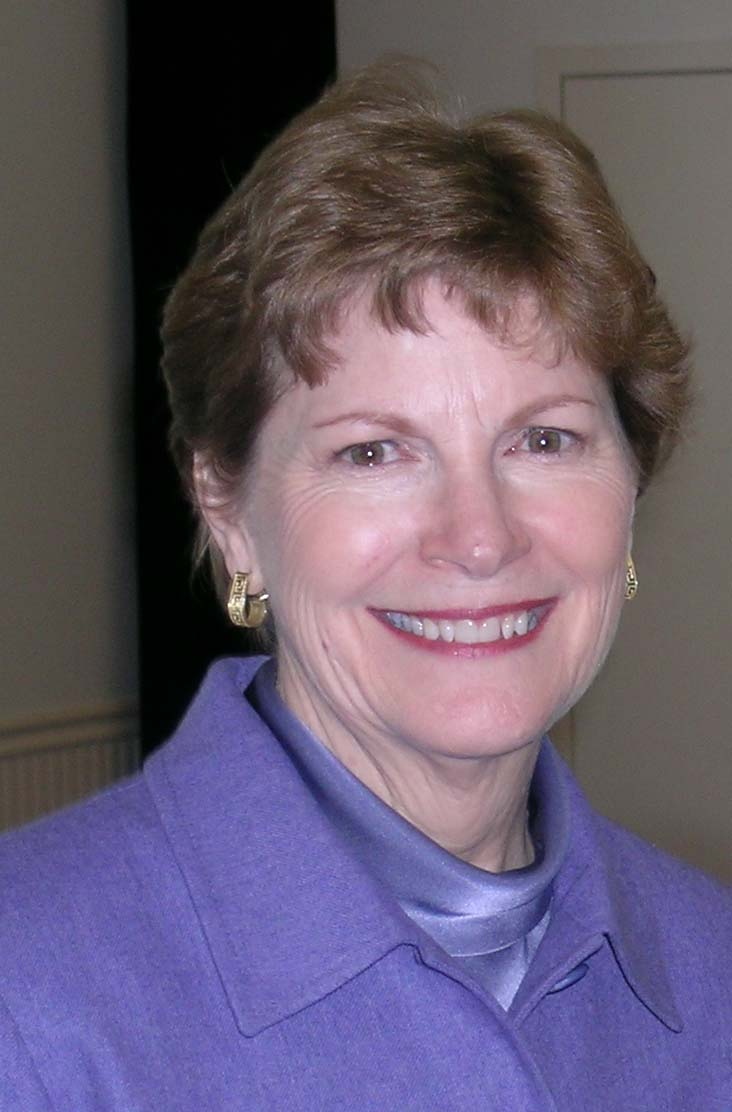

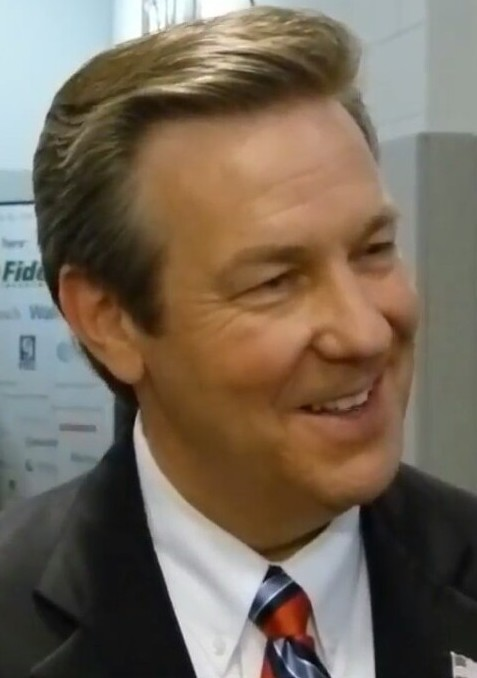
Nominee	Jeanne Shaheen	Ovide Lamontagne
Party	Democratic	Republican
Popular vote	284,175	196,321
Percentage	57.2%	39.5%
- Shaheen: 40–50% 50–60% 60–70% 70–80% >90% Lamontagne: 40–50% 50–60% 60–70% 80–90%
Governor before election
Steve Merrill
Republican
Elected Governor
Jeanne Shaheen
Democratic

The 1996 New Hampshire gubernatorial election took place on November 5, 1996. State Senator Jeanne Shaheen won the election, marking the first time since 1980 that a Democrat was elected Governor of New Hampshire. She defeated Ovide Lamontagne, who had defeated representative Bill Zeliff for the Republican nomination.

== North Carolina ==
1996 North Carolina gubernatorial election
- November 5, 1996
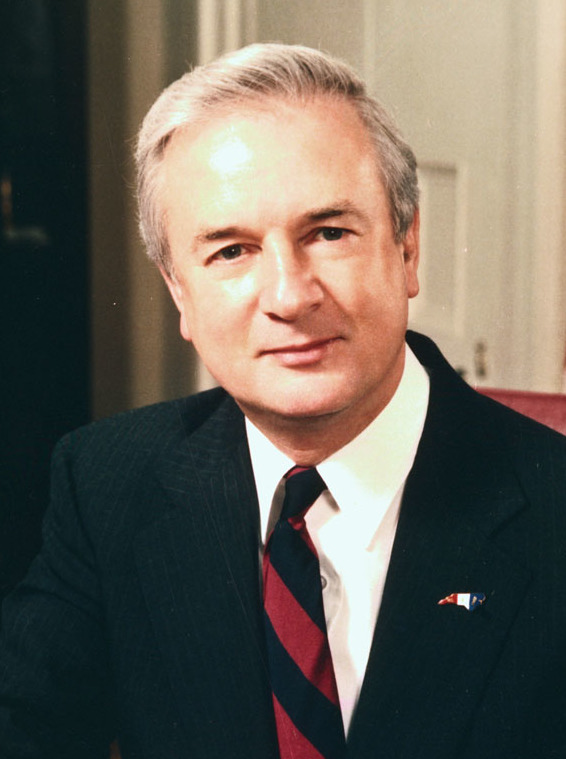

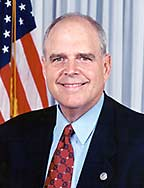
Nominee	Jim Hunt	Robin Hayes
Party	Democratic	Republican
Popular vote	1,436,638	1,097,053
Percentage	55.98%	42.75%
- County results Hunt: 40–50% 50–60% 60–70% 70–80% Hayes: 40–50% 50–60% 60–70%
Governor before election
Jim Hunt
Democratic
Elected Governor
Jim Hunt
Democratic

The 1996 North Carolina gubernatorial election was held on 5 November 1996. The general election was fought between the Democratic nominee, incumbent Governor James "Jim" Hunt and the Republican nominee, state representative Robin Hayes. Hunt won by 339,585 votes, winning his fourth term as governor.

== North Dakota ==
1996 North Dakota gubernatorial election
- November 5, 1996
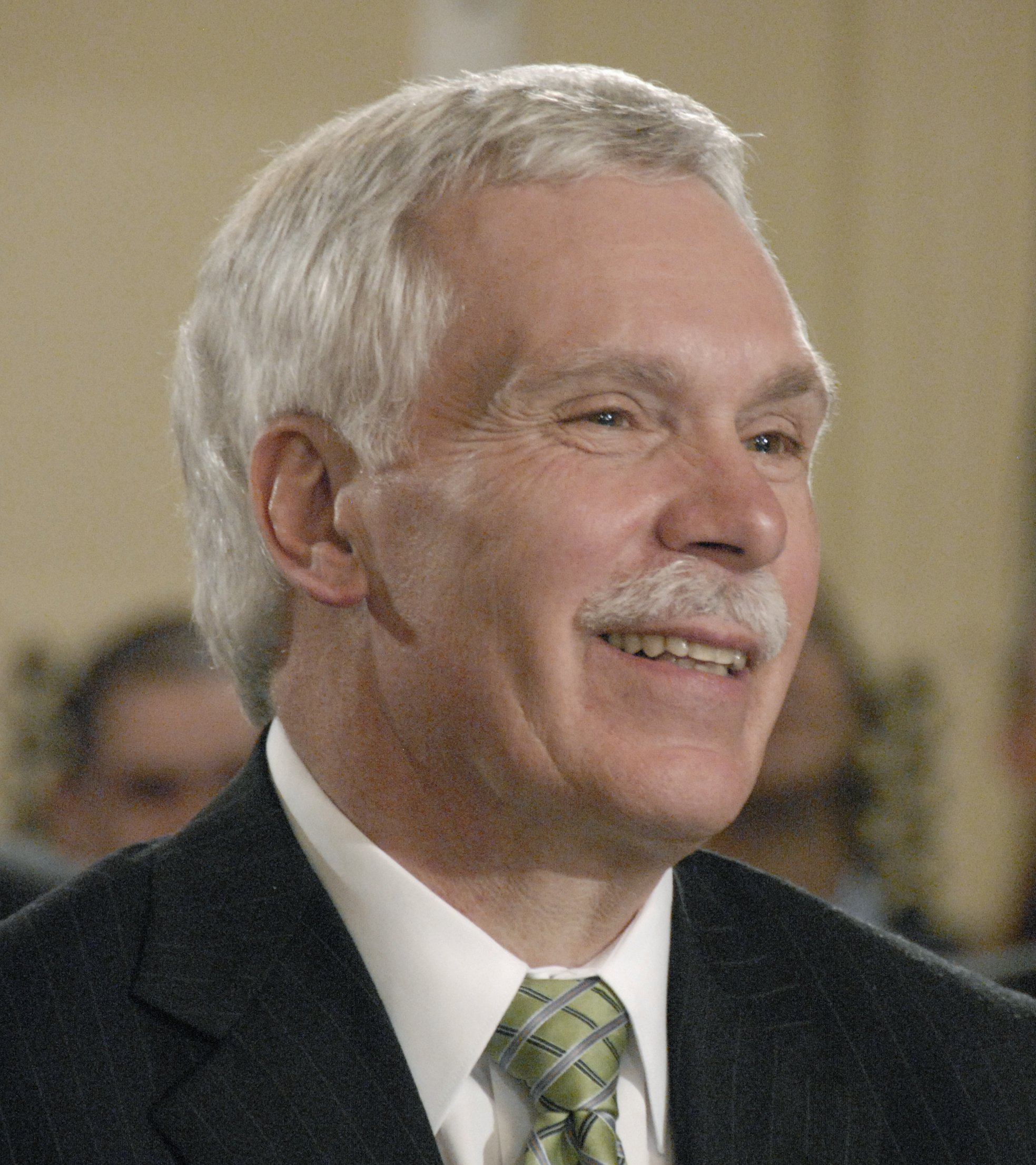

Nominee	Ed Schafer	Lee Kaldor
Party	Republican	Democratic–NPL
Running mate	Rosemarie Myrdal	Barbara Pyle
Popular vote	174,937	89,349
Percentage	66.2%	33.8%
- County results Schafer: 50-60% 60-70% 70-80% 80-90% Kaldor: 50–60%
Governor before election
Ed Schafer
Republican
Elected Governor
Ed Schafer
Republican

The 1996 North Dakota gubernatorial election took place on November 5, 1996. Incumbent Republican Ed Schafer won re-election to a second term as Governor of North Dakota, defeating Democratic-NPL nominee Lee Kaldor. Schafer became the first Republican to win reelection as governor in the state since John E. Davis in 1958, and the first Republican to ever win more than four years in the office.

== Utah ==
1996 Utah gubernatorial election
- November 5, 1996
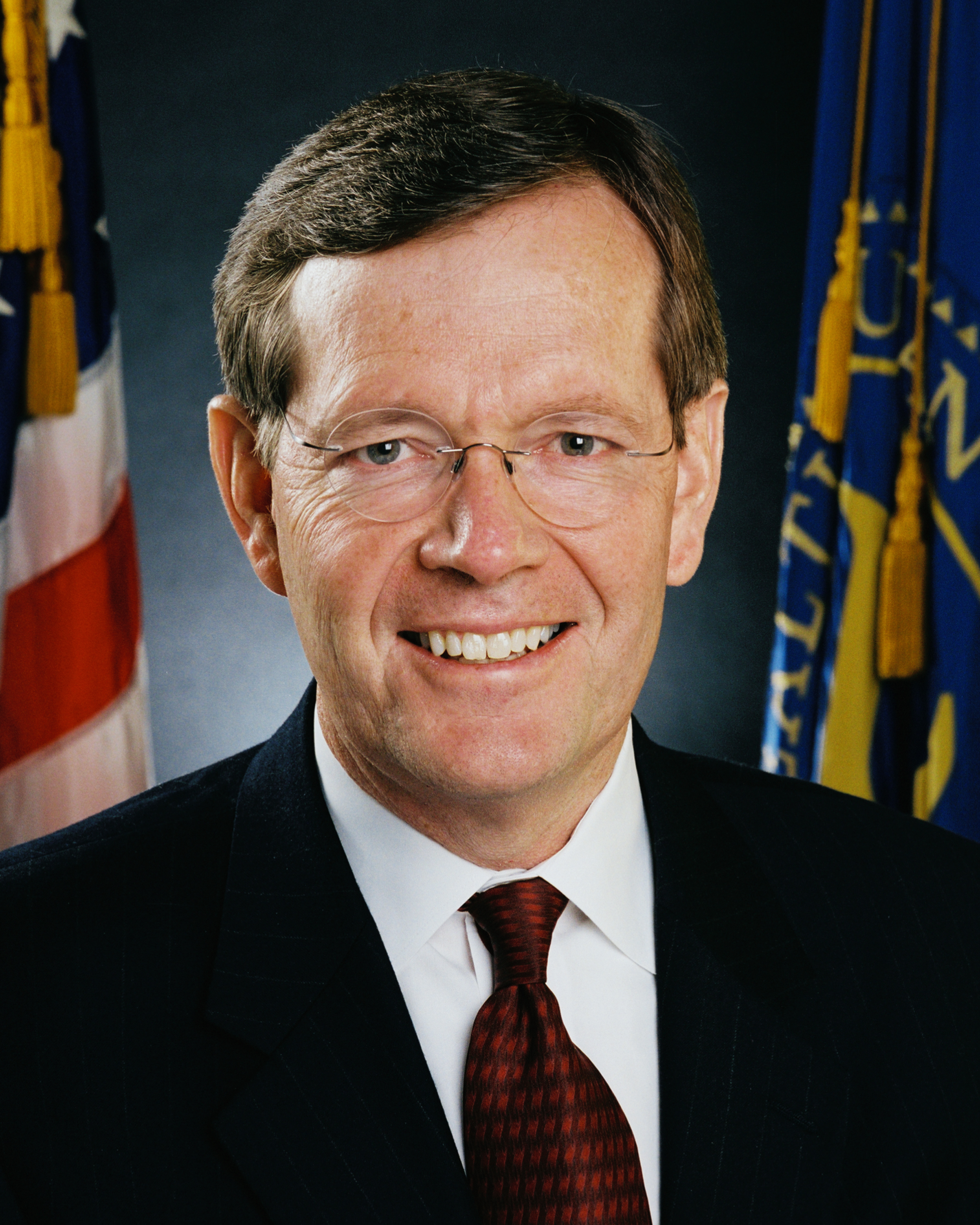

Nominee	Mike Leavitt	Jim Bradley
Party	Republican	Democratic
Running mate	Olene Walker	Shari Holweg
Popular vote	503,693	156,616
Percentage	74.97%	23.31%
- County results Leavitt: 50–60% 60–70% 70–80% 80–90%
Governor before election
Mike Leavitt
Republican
Elected Governor
Mike Leavitt
Republican

The 1996 Utah gubernatorial election took place on November 5, 1996. Republican nominee and incumbent Governor Michael Leavitt won the election.

== Vermont ==
1996 Vermont gubernatorial election
- November 5, 1996
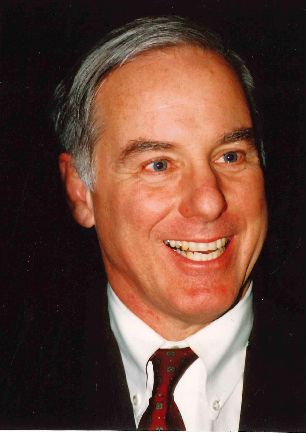

Nominee	Howard Dean	John L. Gropper
Party	Democratic	Republican
Popular vote	179,544	57,161
Percentage	70.5%	22.5%
- Dean: 40-50% 50-60% 60-70% 70-80% 80-90% Gropper: 40-50% 50-60% 60-70%
Governor before election
Howard Dean
Democratic
Elected Governor
Howard Dean
Democratic

The 1996 Vermont gubernatorial election took place on November 5, 1996. Incumbent Democrat Howard Dean ran successfully for re-election to a third full term as Governor of Vermont, defeating Republican nominee John L. Gropper.

== Washington ==
1996 Washington gubernatorial election
- November 5, 1996
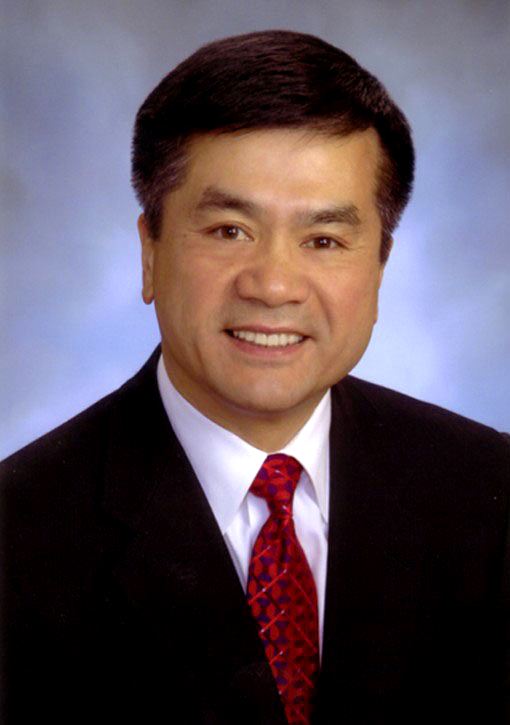

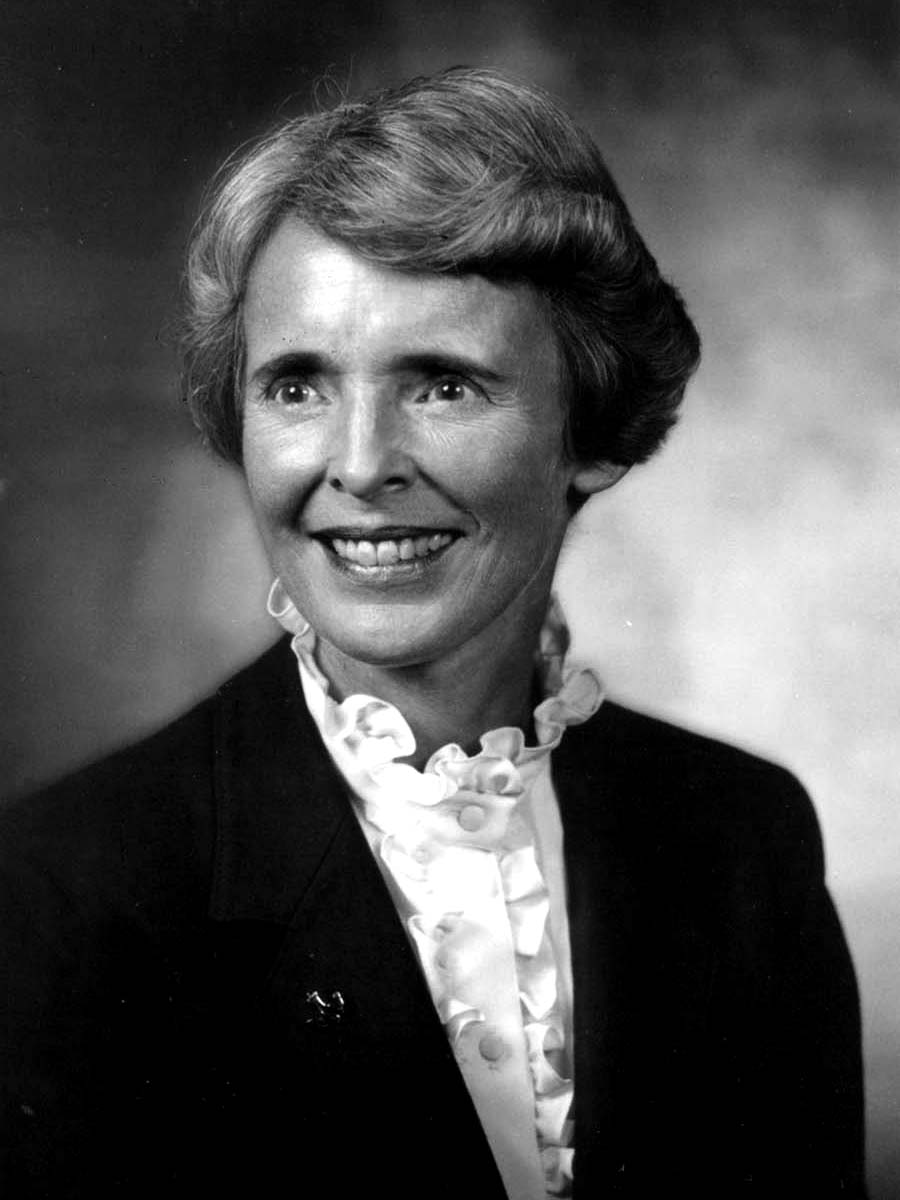
Nominee	Gary Locke	Ellen Craswell
Party	Democratic	Republican
Popular vote	1,296,492	940,538
Percentage	57.96%	42.04%
- County results Locke: 50–60% 60–70% Craswell: 50–60% 60–70%
Governor before election
Mike Lowry
Democratic
Elected Governor
Gary Locke
Democratic

The 1996 Washington gubernatorial election was held on November 5, 1996. Though eligible for a second term, incumbent governor Mike Lowry chose not to run for reelection following a series of personal and public scandals, including allegations of sexual harassment. This gubernatorial race was especially significant in that it resulted in the first Asian American governor in the mainland United States (after George Ariyoshi of island state Hawaii), Democrat Gary Locke.

== West Virginia ==
1996 West Virginia gubernatorial election
- November 5, 1996
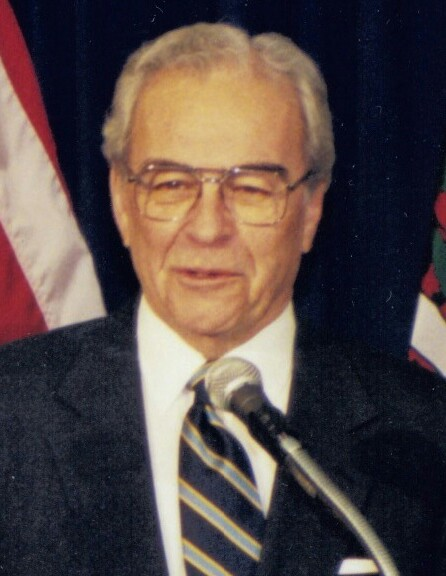

Nominee	Cecil Underwood	Charlotte Pritt
Party	Republican	Democratic
Popular vote	324,518	287,870
Percentage	51.6%	45.8%
- County results Underwood: 40–50% 50–60% 60–70% 70–80% Pritt: 40–50% 50–60% 60–70% 70–80%
Governor before election
Gaston Caperton
Democratic
Elected Governor
Cecil Underwood
Republican

The 1996 West Virginia gubernatorial election took place on November 5, 1996 to elect the Governor of West Virginia. Republican Cecil Underwood, who had previously been the Governor of West Virginia from 1957 to 1961, defeated Democratic State Senator Charlotte Pritt. Concurrently, the state voted the opposite way federally, choosing Democratic U.S. Presidential nominee, incumbent Bill Clinton over Republican nominee Bob Dole in the Presidential election that year.

== Territories ==
=== American Samoa ===
Candidate	Running mate	Votes	%
Tauese Sunia	Togiola Tulafono	4,404	39.74
Leala	Afoa	4,318	38.96
Lutali	Moaliitele	1,377	12.43
Tufele	Fagafaga	941	8.49
Tuika	Mapu	42	0.38
Total		11,082	100.00

=== Puerto Rico ===
Candidate	Party	Votes	%
Pedro Rosselló	New Progressive Party	1,006,331	51.39
Héctor Luis Acevedo	Popular Democratic Party	875,852	44.73
David Noriega Rodríguez	Puerto Rican Independence Party	75,305	3.85
Other candidates		808	0.04
Total		1,958,296	100.00
Valid votes		1,958,296	99.52
Invalid/blank votes		9,409	0.48
Total votes		1,967,705	100.00
Registered voters/turnout		2,380,676	82.65
Source: Nohlen

== See also ==
- 1996 United States elections
  - 1996 United States presidential election
  - 1996 United States Senate elections
  - 1996 United States House of Representatives elections
