= 2000 Montana gubernatorial election =

- November 7, 2000
- Turnout: 59.90%▼10.70
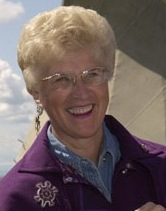

| Nominee | Judy Martz | Mark O'Keefe |
| Party | Republican | Democratic |
| Running mate | Karl Ohs | Carol Williams |
| Popular vote | 209,135 | 193,131 |
| Percentage | 50.98% | 47.08% |
- County results Martz: 50–60% 60–70% 70–80% 80–90% O'Keefe: 50–60% 60–70% 70–80%
Governor before election
Marc Racicot
Republican
Elected Governor
Judy Martz
Republican

The 2000 Montana gubernatorial election took place on November 7, 2000. Republican incumbent Marc Racicot was term-limited. In the open race, Republican lieutenant governor Judy Martz defeated Democratic state auditor Mark O'Keefe. Despite the fact that George W. Bush carried the state in a landslide, Martz narrowly defeated O'Keefe him to win her first and only term as governor.

This was the last time that a Republican was elected governor of Montana until 2020.

== Republican primary ==
=== Candidates ===
- Judy Martz, lieutenant governor of Montana
- Rob Natelson, conservative activist and constitutional law professor

=== Results ===
Republican Primary results
| Party | Candidate | Votes | % |
|---|---|---|---|
| Republican | Judy Martz | 64,278 | 56.88% |
| Republican | Rob Natelson | 48,738 | 43.12% |
| Total votes | | 113,016 | 100.00% |

== Democratic primary ==
=== Candidates ===
- Mike Cooney, secretary of state of Montana
- Joseph Mazurek, attorney general of Montana
- Mark O'Keefe, Montana state auditor

=== Results ===
Democratic Party primary results
| Party | Candidate | Votes | % |
|---|---|---|---|
| Democratic | Mark O'Keefe | 46,294 | 48.04% |
| Democratic | Joseph Mazurek | 34,385 | 35.69% |
| Democratic | Mike Cooney | 15,677 | 16.27% |
| Total votes | | 96,356 | 100.00% |

== General election ==
=== Candidates ===
- Stan Jones (Libertarian)
- Judy Martz, lieutenant governor of Montana (Republican)
- Mark O'Keefe, Montana state auditor (Democratic)

=== Debates ===
- Complete video of debate, October 15, 2000

=== Polling ===
| Poll source | Date(s) | Sample size | Margin of error | Judy Martz (R) | Mark O'Keefe (D) | Other / undecided (Note: Calculated by taking the difference of 100% and all other candidates combined.) |
|---|---|---|---|---|---|---|
| Mason-Dixon Polling & Strategy | October 24, 2000 | 628 | — | 44% | 46% | 10% |
| Montana State University Billings Mountain States Poll | October 21, 2000 | 403 | — | 42% | 45% | 13% |
| Rasmussen Reports | October 19, 2000 | 968 | — | 51% | 38% | 11% |

=== Results ===
Montana gubernatorial election, 2000
| Party | Candidate | Votes | % | ±% |
|---|---|---|---|---|
| Republican | Judy Martz | 209,135 | 50.98% | −28.18% |
| Democratic | Mark O'Keefe | 193,131 | 47.08% | +26.25% |
| Libertarian | Stan Jones | 7,926 | 1.93% | N/A |
| Majority | | 16,004 | 3.90% | −54.43% |
| Turnout | | 410,192 | 100.00% | N/A |
| Republican hold | | | | |

==== By county ====
| County | Judy Martz Republican | | Mark O'Keefe Democratic | | Stan Jones Libertarian | | Margin | | Total |
| County | Votes | % | Votes | % | Votes | % | Votes | % | Total |
|---|---|---|---|---|---|---|---|---|---|
| Beaverhead | 2,889 | 68.83% | 1,246 | 29.69% | 62 | 1.48% | 1,643 | 39.15% | 4,197 |
| Big Horn | 1,402 | 33.65% | 2,699 | 64.77% | 66 | 1.58% | -1,297 | -31.13% | 4,167 |
| Blaine | 1,102 | 40.04% | 1,610 | 58.50% | 40 | 1.45% | -508 | -18.46% | 2,752 |
| Broadwater | 1,316 | 63.85% | 707 | 34.30% | 38 | 1.84% | 609 | 29.55% | 2,061 |
| Carbon | 2,739 | 56.37% | 2,019 | 41.55% | 101 | 2.08% | 720 | 14.82% | 4,859 |
| Carter | 505 | 80.16% | 106 | 16.83% | 9 | 1.43% | 399 | 63.33% | 630 |
| Cascade | 14,479 | 43.58% | 18,096 | 54.47% | 650 | 1.96% | -3,617 | -10.89% | 33,225 |
| Chouteau | 1,722 | 59.69% | 1,112 | 38.54% | 51 | 1.77% | 610 | 21.14% | 2,885 |
| Custer | 2,582 | 51.92% | 2,333 | 46.91% | 58 | 1.17% | 249 | 5.01% | 4,973 |
| Daniels | 691 | 63.86% | 377 | 34.84% | 14 | 1.29% | 314 | 29.02% | 1,082 |
| Dawson | 2,433 | 57.06% | 1,760 | 41.28% | 71 | 1.67% | 673 | 15.78% | 4,264 |
| Deer Lodge | 1,218 | 26.62% | 3,297 | 72.05% | 61 | 1.33% | -2,079 | -45.43% | 4,576 |
| Fallon | 870 | 65.66% | 426 | 32.15% | 29 | 2.19% | 444 | 33.51% | 1,325 |
| Fergus | 3,829 | 63.69% | 2,061 | 34.28% | 122 | 2.03% | 1,768 | 29.41% | 6,012 |
| Flathead | 20,593 | 61.22% | 12,298 | 36.56% | 749 | 2.23% | 8,295 | 24.66% | 33,640 |
| Gallatin | 16,909 | 52.87% | 14,438 | 45.15% | 634 | 1.98% | 2,471 | 7.73% | 31,981 |
| Garfield | 597 | 81.89% | 125 | 17.15% | 7 | 0.96% | 472 | 64.75% | 729 |
| Glacier | 1,410 | 33.64% | 2,700 | 64.41% | 82 | 1.96% | -1,290 | -30.77% | 4,192 |
| Golden Valley | 382 | 71.94% | 137 | 25.80% | 12 | 2.26% | 245 | 46.14% | 531 |
| Granite | 1,010 | 63.68% | 528 | 33.29% | 48 | 3.03% | 482 | 30.39% | 1,586 |
| Hill | 2,544 | 38.86% | 3,858 | 58.93% | 145 | 2.21% | -1,314 | -20.07% | 6,547 |
| Jefferson | 2,967 | 57.65% | 2,086 | 40.53% | 94 | 1.83% | 881 | 17.12% | 5,147 |
| Judith Basin | 905 | 65.25% | 459 | 33.09% | 23 | 1.66% | 446 | 32.16% | 1,387 |
| Lake | 5,983 | 52.34% | 5,179 | 45.31% | 268 | 2.34% | 804 | 7.03% | 11,430 |
| Lewis and Clark | 13,185 | 48.27% | 13,704 | 50.17% | 424 | 1.55% | -519 | -1.90% | 27,313 |
| Liberty | 652 | 62.27% | 374 | 35.72% | 21 | 2.01% | 278 | 26.55% | 1,047 |
| Lincoln | 4,735 | 60.64% | 2,833 | 36.28% | 241 | 3.09% | 1,902 | 24.36% | 7,809 |
| Madison | 2,468 | 67.47% | 1,115 | 30.48% | 75 | 2.05% | 1,353 | 36.99% | 3,658 |
| McCone | 699 | 61.32% | 429 | 37.63% | 12 | 1.05% | 270 | 23.68% | 1,140 |
| Meagher | 656 | 70.16% | 258 | 27.59% | 21 | 2.25% | 398 | 42.57% | 935 |
| Mineral | 836 | 51.32% | 744 | 45.67% | 49 | 3.01% | 92 | 5.65% | 1,629 |
| Missoula | 18,215 | 39.34% | 27,034 | 58.39% | 1,052 | 2.27% | -8,819 | -19.05% | 46,301 |
| Musselshell | 1,371 | 62.52% | 766 | 34.93% | 56 | 2.55% | 605 | 27.59% | 2,193 |
| Park | 4,004 | 54.08% | 3,243 | 43.80% | 157 | 2.12% | 761 | 10.28% | 7,404 |
| Petroleum | 235 | 75.81% | 70 | 22.58% | 5 | 1.61% | 165 | 53.23% | 310 |
| Phillips | 1,598 | 72.08% | 589 | 26.57% | 30 | 1.35% | 1,009 | 45.51% | 2,217 |
| Pondera | 1,569 | 53.88% | 1,300 | 44.64% | 43 | 1.48% | 269 | 9.24% | 2,912 |
| Powder River | 745 | 75.79% | 229 | 23.30% | 9 | 0.92% | 516 | 52.49% | 983 |
| Powell | 1,688 | 59.46% | 1,077 | 37.94% | 74 | 2.61% | 611 | 21.52% | 2,839 |
| Prairie | 498 | 67.21% | 231 | 31.17% | 12 | 1.62% | 267 | 36.03% | 741 |
| Ravalli | 9,772 | 57.05% | 6,982 | 40.76% | 375 | 2.19% | 2,790 | 16.29% | 17,129 |
| Richland | 2,658 | 66.09% | 1,293 | 32.15% | 71 | 1.77% | 1,365 | 33.94% | 4,022 |
| Roosevelt | 1,369 | 35.73% | 2,417 | 63.07% | 46 | 1.20% | -1,048 | -27.35% | 3,832 |
| Rosebud | 1,466 | 41.98% | 1,955 | 55.99% | 71 | 2.03% | -489 | -14.00% | 3,492 |
| Sanders | 2,633 | 56.31% | 1,911 | 40.87% | 132 | 2.82% | 722 | 15.44% | 4,676 |
| Sheridan | 1,052 | 54.14% | 868 | 44.67% | 23 | 1.18% | 184 | 9.47% | 1,943 |
| Silver Bow | 5,750 | 34.23% | 10,837 | 64.51% | 213 | 1.27% | -5,087 | -30.28% | 16,800 |
| Stillwater | 2,417 | 62.10% | 1,392 | 35.77% | 83 | 2.13% | 1,025 | 26.34% | 3,892 |
| Sweet Grass | 1,382 | 75.35% | 422 | 23.01% | 30 | 1.64% | 960 | 52.34% | 1,834 |
| Teton | 1,892 | 57.32% | 1,360 | 41.20% | 49 | 1.48% | 532 | 16.12% | 3,301 |
| Toole | 1,283 | 53.55% | 1,071 | 44.70% | 42 | 1.75% | 212 | 8.85% | 2,396 |
| Treasure | 306 | 64.42% | 163 | 34.32% | 6 | 1.26% | 143 | 30.11% | 475 |
| Valley | 2,137 | 53.79% | 1,750 | 44.05% | 86 | 2.16% | 387 | 9.74% | 3,973 |
| Wheatland | 688 | 68.94% | 298 | 29.86% | 12 | 1.20% | 390 | 39.08% | 998 |
| Wibaux | 302 | 59.80% | 187 | 37.03% | 16 | 3.17% | 115 | 22.77% | 505 |
| Yellowstone | 29,787 | 51.97% | 26,572 | 46.36% | 956 | 1.67% | 3,215 | 5.61% | 57,315 |

===== Counties that flipped from Republican to Democratic =====
- Silver Bow (largest city: Butte)
- Deer Lodge (largest city: Anaconda)
- Missoula (largest city: Missoula)
- Cascade (largest city: Great Falls)
- Lewis and Clark (largest city: Helena)
- Rosebud (largest city: Colstrip)
- Big Horn (largest city: Hardin)
- Glacier (largest city: Cut Bank)
- Roosevelt (largest city: Wolf Point)
- Hill (largest city: Havre)
- Blaine (largest city: Chinook)
