= John Morrison (Montana politician) =

American attorney and politician

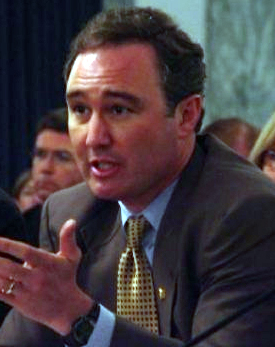

Auditor of Montana
- In office January 1, 2001 – January 5, 2009
- Governor: Judy Martz; Brian Schweitzer
- Preceded by: Mark O'Keefe
- Succeeded by: Monica Lindeen

Personal details
- Born: John Martin Morrison; 1961 (age 64–65)
- Party: Democratic
- Relatives: Frank B. Morrison (grandfather)
- Education: Whitman College (BA); University of Denver (JD)

John Martin Morrison (born 1961) is an American attorney and politician who served as the elected Montana State Auditor and Insurance and Securities Commissioner from 2001 to 2009. Morrison has been a leader in health insurance policy and litigation and has handled prominent legal cases. He is the senior partner at Morrison Sherwood Wilson Deola, a public interest law firm based in Helena, Montana. In 2006, he ran unsuccessfully against Jon Tester in the Montana Democratic primary for the United States Senate nomination.

== Career ==
=== Montana State Auditor ===
Morrison served as Montana State Auditor and Insurance and Securities Commissioner from 2001 to 2008. He promoted and implemented Insure Montana, a small business health insurance pool with discounted premiums paid for by an increase in the tobacco tax. Morrison had been advocating the use of increased tobacco tax revenue to reduce health insurance premiums since 2002. Insure Montana won national awards, and became a model for the premium assistance provisions of the Affordable Care Act. Morrison also drafted Montana's Initiative 155 (I-155) and led the campaign that created Healthy Montana Kids, which instituted a broad reform and massive expansion of children's health coverage. In the first year of operation, it brought over $200 million in new federal matching dollars into Montana and covered 10,000 additional children. Healthy Montana Kids now covers more than half of the children in Montana.

As Insurance Commissioner, Morrison banned "discretionary clauses" in group health and disability insurance plans and successfully defended the ban at the U.S. Court of Appeals for the 9th Circuit in Standard Ins. Co v. Morrison, 584 F. 3d 837 (2009). Through the National Association of Insurance Commissioners (NAIC), Morrison led passage of a similar model law that has been adopted in more than a dozen states, including New York, California, Michigan, Illinois, and Texas. Morrison also led NAIC opposition to Association Health Plans and fraudulent health insurance.

Morrison chaired the Health Insurance and Managed Care Committee and the Market Regulation and Consumer Affairs Committee of the National Association of Insurance Commissioners, as well as the NAIC's September 11 emergency task force. As the NAIC's International Vice Chair for Asia, Morrison helped establish the relationship between U.S. and Chinese insurance regulators and, with the US Trade Representative, represented the U.S. in the US-China Insurance Dialogues, WTO Doha Round, in Hangzhou, PRC.

After leaving office, Morrison was appointed by the Pennsylvania Insurance Commissioner to replace former Surgeon General Dr. C. Everett Koop on the boards of the Senior Health Care Oversight Trust and the Senior Health Insurance Company of Pennsylvania (SHIP) and chaired both boards in 2011. Morrison also serves on and has been vice-chair of the board of the Center for Health Policy Development, the parent organization of the National Academy of State Health Policy.

=== Notable Legal Cases ===
In the 1990s, Morrison was lead Montana counsel in the state's Tobacco litigation and represented the New York Times, NBC and other national media in the Unabomber case. Morrison also handled the Ridley case, which established Montana's unique requirement that insurers pay medical expenses in clear liability cases as they are incurred. Morrison returned to the law practice in 2009 and became senior partner of Morrison, Motl and Sherwood law firm in 2010. In 2015, he received the Appellate Advocacy Award from the Montana Trial Lawyers Association for a series of victories in the Montana Supreme Court, which included cases blocking legislative referendums to establish a "jungle primary" in Montana and to rebate any state budget surplus, as well as Gleason v. Central United Life, which established the notice-prejudice rule in Montana and made law in other areas as well. Morrison was co-counsel for the Plaintiff in Tanya Gersh v. Andrew Anglin, a nationally publicized case involving anti-Semitic attacks against a Jewish Montana woman and her family. The case resulted in the first legal ruling that the First Amendment does not protect troll storm perpetrators from civil liability and a $14 million award against the owner of the Neo-Nazi website the Daily Stormer. Morrison also represented the Plaintiff in Butler v. Unified Life et al, which exposed wrongful claims practices in the short term medical insurance industry and led to a $9 million settlement for Butler and a national class of policyholders. In 2019 and 2020, Morrison was co-counsel for the plaintiff in two successful cases on behalf of the Montana Health CO-OP against the United States regarding the handling of moneys under the Affordable Care Act. Montana Health CO-OP v. United States was the first judicial decision nationally to hold that the Trump administration wrongly withheld "cost sharing reduction" (CSR) payments from insurance carriers that participated in the ACA created insurance exchanges. Morrison said in the New York Times, "The Trump administration's decision on cost-sharing payments was the latest in a long line of political decisions made in Washington that fell hardest on new entrants to the insurance market." Morrison's other CO-OP case, by the same name, challenged the federal government's underpayment of risk corridor payments under the ACA and resulted in a $56.7 million judgment for the CO-OP following the United States Supreme Court's ruling in Maine Community Health Options v. United States. In 2019, Morrison and his co-counsel also obtained a $7 million settlement on behalf of 11,000 employees of five Montana hospitals for violations of ERISA in the handling of their health benefit plans. In 2021, Morrison recovered $2 million for a man wounded in the October 1, 2017 Las Vegas mass shooting.

=== Health CO-OPs ===
Morrison was the founding president of the National Alliance of State Health CO-OPs (NASHCO), which included all Consumer Operated and Oriented Plans authorized and funded under the Patient Protection and Affordable Care Act. He was also co-founder and vice-chair of the Montana Health CO-OP, one of the first CO-OPs to be approved for funding by the United States Department of Health and Human Services, and one of the last remaining.

In 2012, Morrison supported federal low interest loans to CO-OPs and argued against Congressional plans to cut the loan funds from the federal budget. Morrison said the 24 existing CO-OPs would increase competition and innovation in the health insurance marketplace. In October 2013, he released a study showing that premiums were 8.4% lower in states that had a CO-OP than in states that did not. In February 2014, Morrison estimated that 300,000 Americans had signed up for CO-OPs to date despite early technical problems.

In 2015 Morrison testified before the U.S. House Committee on Energy and Commerce Subcommittee on Oversight and Investigations about shutdowns of CO-OPs in various state healthcare exchanges; he said that the situation was the fault of both the Obama administration and Congress, but largely due to the decision of both to pay only 13 percent of the risk corridor payments required by the ACA. The Obama administration's decision to forbid CO-OPs from limiting the number of policies they sold while at the same time limiting their ability to raise money ruined their finances, and Congress' cutting loans available to them also harmed their financial viability. It was Morrison's fourth Congressional testimony.

=== 2006 U.S. Senate election ===
In 2006, Morrison was a candidate for the U.S. Senate in a contested Democratic primary with Jon Tester, the President of the Montana Senate at the time. Morrison initially polled ahead of incumbent Republican Conrad Burns, and was leading in the primary race, but it narrowed to a "deadlock" a week prior to the election. Morrison was beaten in the Democratic primary by Tester, who then defeated Burns in November.

During the Democratic Primary, Morrison confirmed that he had an affair in 1998. Morrison and his wife have been married for more than thirty years. According to the Missoula Independent, the woman involved, years later, married the principal of companies investigated by the state auditors office while Morrison was there. Morrison authorized hiring an outside attorney (and later Montana Supreme Court Justice) Beth Baker who said Morrison told her "he wanted a completely independent review."

=== Writing ===
Morrison and his wife are co-authors of a Montana political history book: Mavericks: The Lives and Battles of Montana's Political Heroes, which has been listed as one of "Twelve Important Works of Historical Non-Fiction About Montana." Morrison also authored or co-authored other published works on topics ranging from health insurance to climate change.
