= Mark O'Keefe (politician) =

American soldier and politician

Auditor of Montana
- In office January 4, 1993 – January 1, 2001
- Governor: Marc Racicot
- Preceded by: Andy Bennett
- Succeeded by: John Morrison

Member of the Montana House of Representatives from the 45th district
- In office 1989–1993
- Preceded by: Joan Miles
- Succeeded by: David Ewer

Personal details
- Born: July 10, 1952 (age 74) Pittston, Pennsylvania, U.S.
- Party: Democratic
- Spouse: Lucy Dayton
- Education: California State University, Sacramento (BA)

Mark O'Keefe (born July 10, 1952) is an American soldier and politician. He is a member of the Democratic Party.

== Early life and career ==
Mark David O'Keefe was born in Pittston, Pennsylvania. In 1970, he graduated from Bishop Egan High School in Fairless Hills, Pennsylvania. O'Keefe served in the United States Army as a paratrooper from 1971 to 1973. In 1977, he received his bachelor's degree in environmental studies from California State University, Sacramento and his master's degree in environmental studies from University of Montana in 1984.

O'Keefe worked for the Montana Department of Natural Resources. O'Keefe married Lucy Bliss Dayton, daughter of Bruce Dayton and great-granddaughter of George Dayton on September 24, 1983. O'Keefe lives with his wife and family in Helena, Montana. He was also a consultant concerning natural resources and politician campaigns.

== Political career ==
O'Keefe served in the Montana House of Representatives from 1988 to 1992 and was a Democrat. From 1992 to 2000, he served as Montana state auditor. In his run for auditor in 1992, he defeated Representative Fred Thomas, receiving 55% of the vote.

In the November general election in 2000, O'Keefe ran for governor of Montana against the Republican candidate Judy Martz and lost the election to Martz.

Party political offices
Preceded by Judy Jacobson	Democratic nominee for Governor of Montana; 2000	Succeeded by Brian Schweitzer
