= Healthy Montana Kids =

Montana Public Policy

The Healthy Montana Kids Plan Act (HMK) is a program that expanded the Children's Health Insurance Program (CHIP) and Medicaid eligibility for children in the state of Montana. The effort to codify HMK was spearheaded by then state auditor, John Morrison. HMK was passed by Montana voters in 2008 under Ballot Initiative 155 and then implemented the following year. After the adoption of HMK, children of families with a household income of up to 250 percent of the federal poverty level were eligible for CHIP coverage. Children of families with incomes up to 185 percent of the federal poverty level were eligible for Medicaid coverage, removing the requirement for clients to make a copay upon receiving treatment. Under HMK, efforts to enroll children in CHIP and Medicaid have increased significantly. HMK also helps to cover the costs of adding children who would be eligible for CHIP or Medicaid to their parents’ existing private insurance plans, thereby saving state funds. The insurance provided under HMK covers medical, dental, and vision care.

Federal funds cover 80 percent of Montana's CHIP costs and 60 percent of Montana's Medicaid costs. A separate revenue account, into which existing tax dollars were funneled, was created to compensate for the costs not covered by the federal government. As such, HMK increased insurance eligibility for Montana children without raising state taxes.

HMK is widely considered a success. Former manager of Montana's Medicaid and Health Services Branch for the state Department of Health and Human Services, Mary Dalton, called it “the most universally popular program [she'd] ever been associated with".

== History ==
Prior to the passage of HMK, around 37,000 children in Montana lacked health insurance. Of the Montana children living in poverty, 29 percent were uninsured. Between 2007 and 2009, CHIP eligibility was capped at families that were at or below 175 percent of the federal poverty level. CHIP covered 16,000 Montana children. Although there was widespread support for expanding health insurance coverage for children, the legislature was unable to reach a consensus on the expansion of CHIP or Medicaid.

Former State auditor John Morrison, was inspired to launch the HMK initiative by his commitment to children's access to healthcare and his frustration with the legislature's inaction on the issue. Morrison wrote the ballot initiative to create HMK and "led a broad-based effort" to enact it, before returning to private life. He said, "It's fair to say we are at the back of the pack [now] among all states in terms of covering kids," Morrison said. "There's no reason for us to be there. This initiative will move us to the front of the pack."

== Campaign ==
Promoters of Ballot Initiative 155 (I-155) promised that the implementation of HMK would insure 30,000 previously uninsured Montana children and that taxes would not be raised to cover the program. They also underscored the benefits that the state would accrue from the matching federal funds. Morrison called for Montana's voters to recognize the moral obligation that the state had to care for its most vulnerable citizens.

=== Path to Ballot ===
To get I-155 on the November ballot, supporters of the Initiative needed to collect 22,308 signatures from registered Montana voters. John Morrison himself, as well as volunteers from Montana-based organizations such as Montana Women Vote and the Human Rights Network, volunteered their time to gather signatures. The organizers solicited support at parades, career fairs, pow wows, and other similar community events. By mid-June 2008, the Initiative already had more than enough signatures. It was then certified by state election officials in July. I-155 was the only ballot initiative in the state of Montana to gather enough signatures to be on the November ballot in 2008.

=== Support ===
I-155 had a broad base of support from a variety of groups in Montana. Montana's two largest health insurance companies, Blue Cross Blue Shield of Montana and New West Health Services, both supported the Initiative's passage. Blue Cross Blue Shield cited the importance of healthcare for children and a likely reduction in the cost of health insurance plans as driving reasons behind their support of the measure. Organizations such as Montana Sheriffs and Peace Officers, the YMCA Alliance of Montana, AARP of Montana, the Montana Nurses Association, and the Children's Defense Fund also voiced their support for the plan. By October 9, 2008, the movement had raised $270,000 in donations, which was used both in the signature-gathering effort and in campaigning as the election drew closer. Polls predicted that the Initiative would easily pass. Then-Governor Brian Schwitzer directed his budget office to begin reserving the funds needed for the Healthy Montana Kids Plan in anticipation of the Initiative's passage.

Though it was far less organized and widespread than the movement in support, the plan also faced some opposition. Governor Brian Schwitzer expressed concern about the state's ability to pay for HMK. The Initiative also sparked criticism from some Republican Montana legislators. Then-Representative John Sinrud called the program "total incrementalism [toward] socialized medicine."

== Adoption ==
=== Passage of I-155 ===
Ballot Initiative 155 was passed with a vote of 70 percent in favor and 30 percent opposed. It won a majority of votes in every county in the state of Montana.

=== Funding Approval ===
The Healthy Montana Kids plan passed by Ballot Initiative 155 included a provision that $22 million would be transferred from the state treasury to a special account to finance the program annually. After the Montana public passed the Initiative, the 2009 Montana legislature had to approve the funding expansion. The Initiative created the special account and transferred the requisite funds to it, but could not approve the transfer of the money from the account to the Montana Department of Health and Human Services to use for the implementation of HMK. At first, the Republicans in the Montana state legislature attempted to block HMK by voting against its funding. The Republican legislators attempted to amend the law to reappropriate the funds in the special account for other uses. Given the broad public support for the plan and the fact that the special account had already been created and filled, however, the Republican majority ultimately agreed to fund the program as enacted by the voters.

== Implementation ==
After the passage of I-155, the legislature needed to update the existing Medicaid and CHIP plans to reflect the changes implemented by the Initiative. The Healthy Montana Kids plan went into effect on October 1, 2009.

In addition to expanding CHIP and Medicaid benefits, I-155 required new measures to help parents enroll their eligible children. To meet this requirement, the state created around 700 ‘enrollment partners,’ consisting of school districts, Native American tribes, hospitals, local governments, and the like, across Montana that aided in the enrollment of eligible children in their communities. The state was particularly invested in outreach to Native American communities.

== Impact ==
The Healthy Montana Kids Plan has been a success. Since the passage of Initiative 155, 60,000 more children in the state of Montana are now covered by CHIP or Medicaid. The Montana Department of Health and Human Services (DPHHS) reported in 2019 that 120,000 Montana children benefit from HMK, which translates to roughly half of all children in Montana receiving their coverage through the program. Around 88 percent of children covered by HMK are on Medicaid, referred to by DPHHS as "HMK Plus," which has the lower income threshold and provides more complete coverage. Of the newly covered children, 19 percent are Native American. Many of the children covered by HMK were already eligible for government-covered health insurance, but the outreach efforts and widespread marketing of HMK led parents to check to see if they were eligible and enroll their children.

Between the enactment of I-155 and 2019, the state of Montana received some $700 million in federal funding for children's health insurance.

== Response ==
The response to the Healthy Montana Kids plan has been positive. Officials in the Montana Department of Health and Human Services have expressed their satisfaction with the plan. The former director of the department, Anna Sorrell, said that she was "excited [...] with the success [the Department] has had with [HMK]". Former manager of the Medicaid and Health Services branch of the Department Mary Dalton said that the program "has been an outstanding success". Dalton noted that children who have access to affordable healthcare lead healthier lives and perform better in school. S.J. Howell, the director of Montana Women Vote, called the program a "success story".

Republicans in the Montana legislature still express some reservations about the plan's success. Former Montana state Senator Dave Lewis referred to the fact that most children that receive health insurance through HMK are covered by Medicaid rather than CHIP a "stealth Medicaid expansion". Despite these misgivings, Lewis has said that he is "glad to see everyone get coverage".

== During the COVID-19 Pandemic ==
During the COVID-19 pandemic, the Healthy Montana Kids plan expanded its coverage to include telehealth. The expansion to cover video, audio, and instant messaging appointments with healthcare providers will continue until further notice.
