= 1996 Puerto Rican general election =

- November 5, 1996
- Gubernatorial election
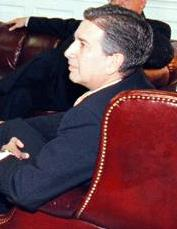

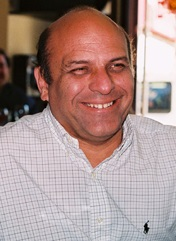
Nominee	Pedro Rosselló	Héctor Luis Acevedo
Party	New Progressive	Popular Democratic
Alliance	Democratic	Democratic
Popular vote	1,006,331	875,852
Percentage	51.39%	44.73%
- Results by municipality Rosselló: 40–50% 50–60% 60–70% Acevedo: 40–50% 50–60%
Governor before election
Pedro Rosselló
New Progressive
Elected Governor
Pedro Rosselló
New Progressive
- Resident Commissioner election
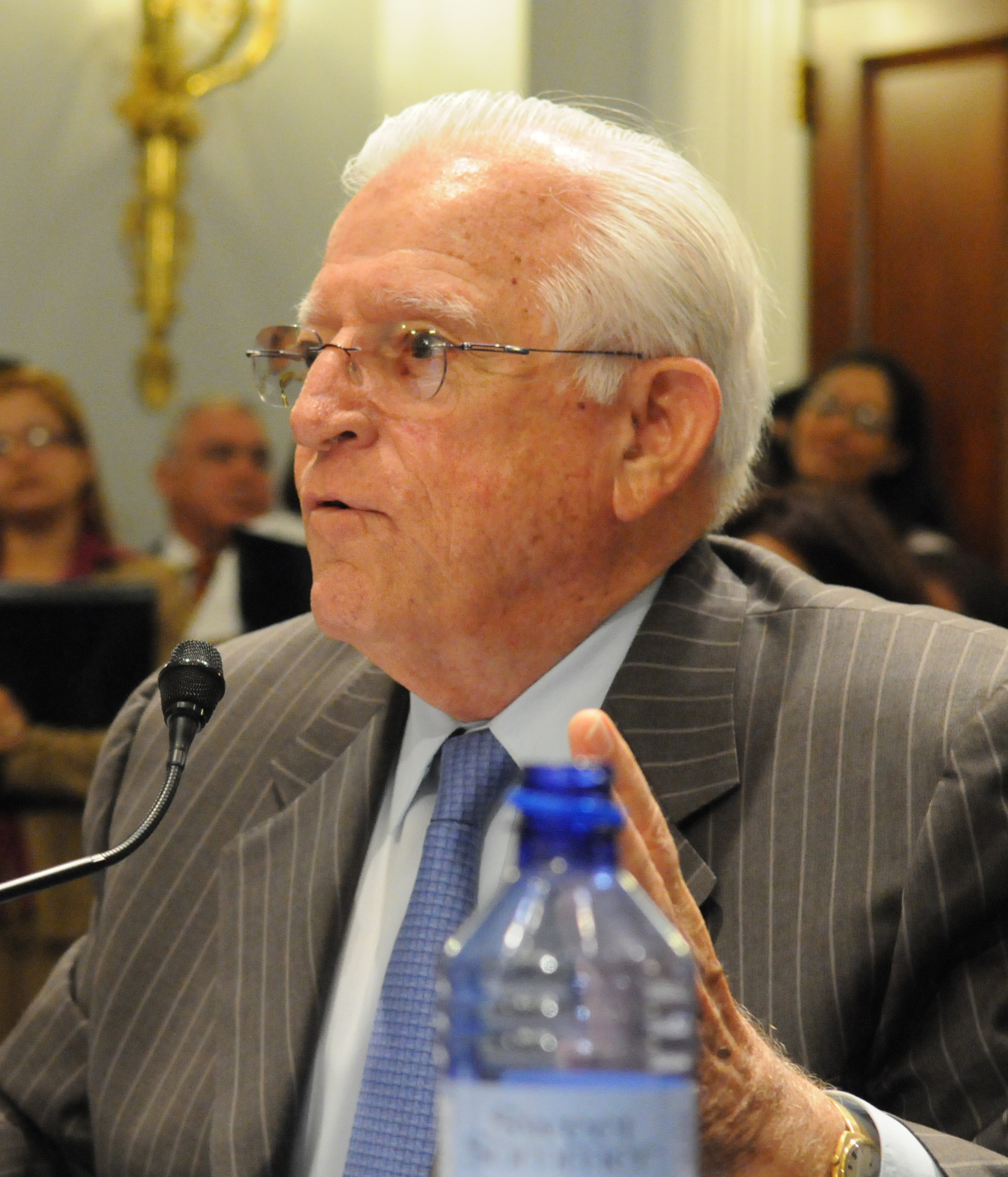

Nominee	Carlos Romero Barceló	Celeste Benítez
Party	New Progressive	Popular Democratic
Alliance	Democratic
Popular vote	973,654	904,048
Percentage	50.01%	46.43%
- Results by municipality Barceló: 40–50% 50–60% 60–70% Benítez: 40–50% 50–60%

General elections were held in Puerto Rico on November 5, 1996. Pedro Rosselló of the New Progressive Party (PNP) was re-elected Governor, whilst the PNP also won a majority of seats in the House of Representatives and the Senate. Voter turnout was between 80% and 82%.

== Results ==
=== Governor ===
Candidate	Party	Votes	%
Pedro Rosselló	New Progressive Party	1,006,331	51.39
Héctor Luis Acevedo	Popular Democratic Party	875,852	44.73
David Noriega Rodríguez	Puerto Rican Independence Party	75,305	3.85
Other candidates		808	0.04
Total		1,958,296	100.00
Valid votes		1,958,296	99.52
Invalid/blank votes		9,409	0.48
Total votes		1,967,705	100.00
Registered voters/turnout		2,380,676	82.65
Source: Nohlen

=== Resident Commissioner ===
Candidate	Party	Votes	%
Carlos Romero Barceló	New Progressive Party	973,654	50.01
Celeste Benítez	Popular Democratic Party	904,048	46.43
Manuel Rodríguez Orellana	Puerto Rican Independence Party	68,828	3.54
Other candidates		440	0.02
Total		1,946,970	100.00
Valid votes		1,946,970	99.52
Invalid/blank votes		9,409	0.48
Total votes		1,956,379	100.00
Registered voters/turnout		2,380,676	82.18
Source: Nohlen

=== House of Representatives ===
Party	At-large			District			Total seats	+/–
Party	Votes	%	Seats	Votes	%	Seats	Total seats	+/–
New Progressive Party	906,693	48.01	6	960,491	50.41	31	37	+1
Popular Democratic Party	814,952	43.15	4	854,097	44.82	9	16	0
Puerto Rican Independence Party	140,964	7.46	1	88,790	4.66	0	1	0
Other parties	346	0.02	0	2,093	0.11	0	0	0
Independents	25,720	1.36	0				0	New
Total	1,888,675	100.00	11	1,905,471	100.00	40	54	+1
Valid votes	1,888,675	98.79						
Invalid votes	17,705	0.93						
Blank votes	5,396	0.28						
Total votes	1,911,776	100.00						
Registered voters/turnout	2,380,676	80.30						
Source: Nohlen, Puerto Rico Election Archive

=== Senate ===
Party	At-large			District			Total seats	+/–
Party	Votes	%	Seats	Votes	%	Seats	Total seats	+/–
New Progressive Party	886,455	46.97	6	1,889,235	50.19	13	19	–1
Popular Democratic Party	772,044	40.90	5	1,698,240	45.12	3	8	0
Puerto Rican Independence Party	160,005	8.48	1	175,500	4.66	0	1	0
Other parties	458	0.02	0	945	0.03	0	0	0
Independents	68,466	3.63	0				0	0
Total	1,887,428	100.00	12	3,763,920	100.00	16	28	–1
Valid votes	1,887,428	98.79						
Invalid votes	5,396	0.28						
Blank votes	17,705	0.93						
Total votes	1,910,529	100.00						
Registered voters/turnout	2,380,676	80.25						
Source: Nohlen, Puerto Rico Election Archive
