= Gersh v. Anglin =

Gersh v. Anglin is an American lawsuit that tested whether an internet-based ideologue who provoked an antisemitic "troll storm" attack on a private person deserved Constitutional free speech protection. The case was widely covered by media in the United States and other countries.

== Background ==
In 2017, Tanya Gersh, a Jewish-American woman in Whitefish, Montana sued Andrew Anglin, founder of The Daily Stormer, a neo-Nazi website. Gersh's complaint alleged that Anglin caused attacks to be launched against her and her family, including more than 700 hateful, threatening, violent messages, electronic or otherwise. Gersh, a real estate agent, alleged that the attacks were spurred on by Anglin as he encouraged his followers to badger her, her husband, and her young son.

The "troll storm" that targeted Gersh revolved around a phone call she had with Sherry Spencer, the mother of white supremacist Richard Spencer. He had given a speech after the 2016 election in which he urged his alt-right audience, with an outstretched arm, to "Hail Trump, hail our people, hail victory!" The speech went viral and caused outrage in Whitefish, because he lived there part-time with his mother, who also owned a commercial building where local residents were preparing to protest. Amid the controversy, Ms. Spencer called Gersh and asked what she should do. Gersh suggested that Ms. Spencer sell the building and give some of the funds to a Whitefish group that promoted tolerance and diversity. According to Gersh, Ms. Spencer agreed that was a good idea and asked Gersh if she would serve as the real estate agent. Gersh was hesitant but accepted. Sometime after the call, Ms. Spencer changed her mind and published on a blog "that Gersh had tried to threaten and extort her into agreeing to sell her building, making a donation, and denouncing her son's views."

In response, on December 16, 2020, Anglin published his first of about thirty articles on The Daily Stormer website attacking Gersh. It said: "Are y'all ready for an old fashioned Troll Storm?" The article, titled "Jews Targeting Richard Spencer's Mother for Harassment and Extortion — TAKE ACTION!" Anglin also relayed a set of instructions: "Just make your opinions known. Tell them you are sickened by their Jew agenda." The articles went out to "hundreds of thousands of visitors each month" and used Nazi language and the Nazi tactic of "terrorizing individuals." To facilitate the attacks, the articles also published Gersh's personal contact information online, a tactic called doxing.

Gersh and her family received emails, calls, voicemails, texts, letters, postcards, and social media comments that included threats and messages with anti-Semitic language. These communications also called for physical intimidation by individuals in the Whitefish area as well as online intimidation – often urged by Anglin. Anglin's followers, in turn, used slurs and threats. Voicemails included gunshots; emails and texts read: "I hope you die," "Kill yourself," "We will take pleasure in your pain." Gersh was called a "bitch," "a worthless cunt," and a "filthy kike." Once voicemail said: "You are surprisingly easy to find on the Internet. And in real life." A Twitter message to Gersh's son read: "psst, kid, there's a free Xbox One inside this oven."

Photos on The Daily Stormer website of Gersh and her son were superimposed on images of Auschwitz, a concentration camp from World War II. A caller said: "You should have died in the Holocaust with the rest of your people." Their goal was, through their own admission, to bring Gersh to "the brink of suicide." As a result of their bombardment, Gersh faced panic attacks, anxiety, and physical symptoms of distress like hair loss and physical aches and pains.

== Legal argument and First Amendment ruling ==
Tanya Gersh was represented by prominent Montana attorney and former State Auditor John Morrison together with co-counsel David Dinielli, Elizabeth Littrell, Richard Cohen, and Morris Dees of the Southern Poverty Law Center. The legal claims brought against Anglin included "invading Gersh's privacy and intentionally inflicting emotional distress" and asserted that Anglin's "campaign violated the Montana Anti-Intimidation Act."

=== Personal jurisdiction ===
Anglin, represented in the case by Las Vegas attorney Marc Randazza, initially argued that the Court did not have subject matter or personal jurisdiction over Anglin, who claimed he was not a citizen of any state, refused to reveal his location, and had not personally been served with the Complaint. U.S. Magistrate Judge Jeremiah C. Lynch denied Anglin's jurisdictional motion to dismiss, finding that he maintained significant business and personal ties to Ohio and Gersh's publication of notice of the case was sufficient service.

=== First Amendment ruling ===
From the outset of the case, Morrison had said Anglin's attacks did not deserve First Amendment protection. He told CNN, "This is not free speech, this is nothing protected by the First Amendment, this is not the expression of political opinion. The purpose of this is to damage these people, the purpose of this is to cause them fear and emotional harm, and that's illegal." He told National Public Radio: "These are not informational opinion or any other kind of protected First Amendment communications, these are assaults."

Nevertheless, after the Court found jurisdiction, Anglin moved to dismiss Gersh's claims on First Amendment grounds. Randazza wrote, in support of the motion: "Even Nazi expression, no matter the psychic harm on Jewish residents, is nonetheless protected speech. ... Every word uttered by Mr. Anglin in this public dispute is protected by the First Amendment, no matter how many people find those views intolerable." Gersh's attorneys responded that Anglin wasn't speaking on any broad public issues. Rather, he directed his followers to terrorize Gersh personally through private means of communication. They also argued: "Severe emotional distress was not only the foreseeable consequences of [Anglin's] troll storm but its very end, and [Anglin] cannot wash his hands of it."

Following recommendations by Magistrate Judge Lynch, United States District Judge Dana Christensen denied the motion to dismiss and held that Anglin's speech was not entitled to free speech protection. The Court explained: "Anglin did not use speech about Gersh to raise awareness for issues consonant with the alt-right agenda." Instead, Anglin drew on "his readers' hatred and fear of Jews, rousing their political sympathies." He called for "confrontation"- and "action" and "exploited the prejudices widely held among his readers to specifically target one individual."

Christensen found: "The harm alleged by Gersh is precisely the type of harm not only anticipated but requested by Anglin in his Daily Stormer posts."

After the decision, attorney Dinielli told the Washington Post, "The trollers used every route to terrorize [Gersh]," calling it "intrusion into seclusion... There is no First Amendment right to call upon hundreds of thousands of readers to launch a public attack on a private individual with the intent of ruining her life. That's simply not something that our Constitution protects."

== Decision ==
In April 2019, Anglin failed to show up for his court-ordered deposition, and Randazza and his firm moved to withdraw as counsel. Randazza said: "My client made the decision years ago he was going to expatriate himself and never return. ... When a federal judge tells you to do something and you refuse, you put your lawyer in a difficult position." Gersh entered Anglin's default and, following a hearing on her damages, Magistrate Judge Lynch recommended judgment in her favor for $14 million, including $4,042,438 in compensatory damages and $10 million in punitive damages, the maximum allowed under state law, for "the particularly egregious and reprehensible nature of Anglin's conduct." Lynch also recommended a permanent injunction against Anglin because "the atrocious conduct directed at Gersh and her family has not entirely abated." Judge Christensen adopted the recommendation and entered judgment in Gersh's favor."

Following Lynch's recommendations, Gersh said in a statement: "A clear message has been sent to Anglin and other extremists: No one should be terrorized for simply being who they are, and no one should ever be afraid for being who they are. This lawsuit has always been about stopping others from enduring the terror I continue to live through at the hands of a neo-Nazi and his followers, and I wanted to make sure that this never happens to anyone else." Morrison said, "This is a big win for our client, but it also sends an important message that hateful harassment by bigots will not be tolerated in Big Sky Country." Dinielli said: "The real story here is that Tanya Gersh, a small-town realtor from Montana, stood up to the internet's most notorious Nazi, and she won."

== Continuing developments ==
Dinielli said in a statement after the judgment, "We will go to the ends of the earth to collect the judgment on behalf of our client, Tanya Gersh, whether it's cash, assets, or intellectual property." In December 2020, Gersh's attorneys filed papers with the Court stating that Anglin had not paid any portion of the August 2019 judgment and that he has ignored requests for information about his whereabouts, his operation of the website, and his assets. Gersh's lawyers advised the Court that collection efforts are underway but are "time-consuming and extremely complex" given Anglin's lack of cooperation and history of holding assets in cryptocurrency. They asked the Court to compel Anglin to respond to pending requests regarding and to sanction Anglin for his "continued lack of cooperation."

The Gersh case continues to garner national media coverage. A retrospective review of the case was published by The New York Times in September 2021. The case has also been covered in books including (((Semitism))): Being Jewish in America in the Age of Trump by Jonathan Weisman.
