= 1996 Montana gubernatorial election =

- November 5, 1996
- Turnout: 70.60%▼8.30
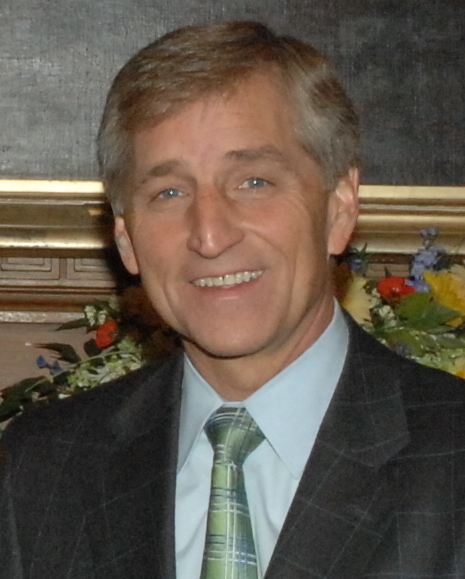

Nominee	Marc Racicot	Judy Jacobson (replacing Chet Blaylock)
Party	Republican	Democratic
Running mate	Judy Martz	Judy Jacobson
Popular vote	320,768	84,407
Percentage	79.17%	20.83%
- County results Racicot: 50–60% 60–70% 70–80% 80–90% >90%
Governor before election
Marc Racicot
Republican
Elected Governor
Marc Racicot
Republican

The 1996 Montana gubernatorial election took place on November 5, 1996. Incumbent Governor of Montana Marc Racicot, who was first elected in 1992, ran for re-election. After winning the Republican primary against conservative activist Rob Natelson, he moved on to the general election, where he was set to face Chet Blaylock, a former state senator and the Democratic nominee. However, on October 23, 1996, Blaylock died of a heart attack, and the Montana Democratic Party selected his running mate, State Senator Judy Jacobson, to replace him, and she therefore became both the gubernatorial nominee and the lieutenant gubernatorial nominee. Ultimately, Racicot won re-election to his second and final term, winning more than 79% of votes and outperforming Republican nominee Bob Dole's victory margin in the concurrent presidential race by 55.6%. As of 2026, this is the largest gubernatorial victory in Montana State history.

As of 2026, this is the last time that the winning gubernatorial nominee carried all counties in Montana. This election was the first time since 1956 and the last until 2024 that an incumbent Republican governor of Montana was re-elected.

== Democratic primary ==
=== Candidates ===
- Chet Blaylock, former state senator
- Bob Kelleher, perennial candidate

=== Results ===
Democratic Party primary results
Party	Candidate	Votes	%
Democratic	Chet Blaylock	55,120	74.61
Democratic	Bob Kelleher	18,761	25.39
Total votes		73,881	100.00

Note: Following Blaylock's death, Judy Jacobson, his running mate, was selected to replace him on the ballot as the Democratic nominee.

== Republican primary ==
=== Candidates ===
- Rob Natelson, conservative activist and constitutional law professor
- Marc Racicot, incumbent governor of Montana

=== Results ===
Republican primary results
Party	Candidate	Votes	%
Republican	Marc Racicot (incumbent)	92,644	76.37
Republican	Rob Natelson	28,672	23.63
Total votes		121,316	100.00

== General election ==
=== Results ===
Montana gubernatorial election, 1996
Party	Candidate	Votes	%	±%
Republican	Marc Racicot (incumbent)	320,768	79.17%	+27.82%
Democratic	Judy Jacobson	84,407	20.83%	−27.82%
Majority		236,361	58.34%	+55.64%
Turnout		405,175		
Republican hold		Swing		

==== Results by county ====
County	Marc Racicot Republican		Judy Jacobson Democratic		Margin		Total votes cast
County	#	%	#	%	#	%	Total votes cast
Beaverhead	3,553	88.3%	473	11.7%	3,080	76.6%	4,026
Big Horn	2,281	54.1%	1,933	45.9%	348	8.2%	4,214
Blaine	1,930	67.5%	928	32.5%	1,002	35.0%	2,858
Broadwater	1,665	84.7%	301	15.3%	1,364	69.4%	1,966
Carbon	3,815	80.3%	934	19.7%	2,881	60.6%	4,749
Carter	665	88.3%	88	11.7%	577	76.6%	753
Cascade	28,511	81.0%	6,684	19.0%	21,827	62.0%	35,195
Chouteau	2,713	86.3%	430	13.7%	2,283	72.6%	3,143
Custer	4,315	80.4%	1,049	19.6%	3,266	60.8%	5,364
Daniels	1,037	80.3%	254	19.7%	783	60.6%	1,291
Dawson	3,781	80.8%	897	19.2%	2,884	61.6%	4,678
Deer Lodge	3,458	70.0%	1,484	30.0%	1,974	40.0%	4,942
Fallon	1,240	88.1%	168	11.9%	1,072	76.2%	1,408
Fergus	5,064	84.3%	940	15.7%	4,124	68.6%	6,004
Flathead	26,670	82.4%	5,682	17.6%	20,988	64.8%	32,352
Gallatin	23,357	81.1%	5,447	18.9%	17,910	62.2%	28,804
Garfield	682	91.9%	60	8.1%	622	83.8%	742
Glacier	2,423	58.9%	1,690	41.1%	733	17.8%	4,113
Golden Valley	427	87.5%	61	12.5%	366	75.0%	488
Granite	1,195	85.8%	198	14.2%	997	71.6%	1,393
Hill	5,239	73.5%	1,892	26.5%	3,347	47.0%	7,131
Jefferson	3,952	82.5%	836	17.5%	3,116	65.0%	4,788
Judith Basin	1,168	86.8%	177	13.2%	991	73.6%	1,345
Lake	8,149	76.2%	2,547	23.8%	5,602	52.4%	10,696
Lewis and Clark	21,668	80.8%	5,135	19.2%	16,533	61.6%	26,803
Liberty	1,058	89.9%	119	10.1%	939	79.8%	1,177
Lincoln	6,379	83.2%	1,284	16.8%	5,095	66.4%	7,663
Madison	3,018	86.6%	465	13.4%	2,553	73.2%	3,483
McCone	990	80.8%	236	19.2%	754	61.6%	1,226
Meagher	821	88.7%	105	11.3%	716	77.4%	926
Mineral	1,215	75.9%	385	24.1%	830	51.8%	1,600
Missoula	32,877	74.2%	11,426	25.8%	21,451	48.4%	44,303
Musselshell	1,755	84.2%	329	15.8%	1,426	68.4%	2,084
Park	5,964	81.8%	1,327	18.2%	4,637	63.6%	7,291
Petroleum	257	89.5%	30	10.5%	227	79.0%	287
Phillips	2,209	88.0%	301	12.0%	1,908	76.0%	2,510
Pondera	2,473	84.0%	472	16.0%	2,001	68.0%	2,945
Powder River	893	87.4%	129	12.6%	764	74.8%	1,022
Powell	2,293	81.4%	525	18.6%	1,768	62.8%	2,818
Prairie	666	85.4%	114	14.6%	552	70.8%	780
Ravalli	13,161	82.1%	2,863	17.9%	10,298	64.2%	16,024
Richland	3,576	78.2%	998	21.8%	2,578	67.4%	4,574
Roosevelt	2,416	61.1%	1,535	38.9%	881	22.2%	3,951
Rosebud	2,674	71.1%	1,089	28.9%	1,585	42.2%	3,763
Sanders	3,554	77.6%	1,028	22.4%	2,526	55.2%	4,582
Sheridan	1,820	74.9%	609	25.1%	1,211	49.8%	2,429
Silver Bow	11,876	67.1%	5,813	32.9%	6,063	34.2%	17,689
Stillwater	3,243	84.0%	620	16.0%	2,623	68.0%	3,863
Sweet Grass	1,562	87.5%	223	12.5%	1,339	75.0%	1,785
Teton	2,858	86.6%	442	13.4%	2,416	73.2%	3,300
Toole	2,044	82.7%	429	17.3%	1,615	65.4%	2,473
Treasure	428	85.8%	71	14.2%	357	71.6%	499
Valley	3,326	78.3%	923	21.7%	2,403	56.6%	4,249
Wheatland	915	84.4%	169	15.6%	746	68.8%	1,084
Wibaux	484	81.9%	107	18.1%	377	63.8%	591
Yellowstone	45,005	81.9%	9,953	18.1%	35,052	63.8%	54,958
Totals	320,768	79.2%	84,407	20.8%	236,361	58.4%	405,175

Counties that flipped from Democratic to Republican

- Blaine
- Big Horn
- Cascade
- Deer Lodge
- Glacier
- Hill
- Mineral
- Missoula
- Rosebud
- Roosevelt
- Sheridan
- Silver Bow
