= Karl Ohs =

American politician (1946-2007)

32nd Lieutenant Governor of Montana
- In office January 1, 2001 – January 3, 2005
- Governor: Judy Martz
- Preceded by: Judy Martz
- Succeeded by: John Bohlinger

44th Chair of the National Lieutenant Governors Association
- In office 2003–2004
- Preceded by: Charles Fogarty
- Succeeded by: John Carney

Member of the Montana House of Representatives from the 33rd district
- In office January 2, 1995 – January 1, 2001
- Preceded by: William R. "Bill" Wiseman
- Succeeded by: Diane Rice

Personal details
- Born: November 18, 1946 Malta, Montana, U.S.
- Died: November 25, 2007 (aged 61) Helena, Montana, U.S.
- Party: Republican
- Spouse: Sherri Ohs
- Children: 4

Karl Ohs (November 18, 1946 – November 25, 2007) was an American politician who served as the 28th Lieutenant Governor of the state of Montana serving under Judy Martz.

== Background ==
Karl Ohs was born in Malta, Montana, the son of a Swedish immigrant. He was a Montana rancher and farmer prior entering politics. He attended Montana State College (Later Montana State University) where he wrestled for the Fighting Bobcats and was a two time Big Sky Conference Champion. In 1969, Ohs left his studies in agricultural economics at Montana State University to help the family move to a new ranch in Pony, Montana in a Tobacco Root Mountain valley outside Harrison in Madison County. Ohs was only a few credits short of graduation when he left Montana State.

He stayed on to work the family ranch with his father and his brother, Jerry, and raised his four children, Brad, Eric, Brian and Elizabeth. While serving as Lieutenant Governor, Karl returned to MSU and completed his Bachelor of Science degree in agricultural business in 2004. Accepting his diploma and giving the commencement speech, Ohs said, "I promised myself I would be back, but I never thought it would be 40 years."

== Political career ==
Ohs political involvement was sparked when he attended Willie Nelson's Farm Aid conference in St. Louis in September 1986. Carrying the vital spirit sparked by meeting with farmers and ranchers from all over the United States, Ohs returned home and began searching for ways and means of increasing economic options for Montana agriculture. In 1988, Ohs and nine other Montana ranchers and farmers formed Montana Agricultural Producers, Inc. (MAGPI). Ohs served as Chairman of MAGPI, leading the company's exploration of alternative products and alternative markets.

For MAGPI, alternative crops had to be accompanied by alternative markets. "No sense in growing it if you can't sell it and make a profit," Ohs often said. In 1989 and 1990, Ohs traveled throughout Montana, educating and encouraging farmers to consider canola as a contract crop, much as they did for barley. MAGPI also promoted production of weed seed-free hay, participating in programs to require only weed seed-free hay on US Forest Service and State owned lands: "It's win-win all they [sic?] way around: we need to get after our noxious weeds here in Montana and we need to find crops farmers can grow that have a market."

Ohs served in the Montana House of Representatives in 1995, 1997, and 1999. During the 1997 and 1999 sessions, he served as Majority Whip. During his time in the Montana State Legislature, Ohs sponsored the legislation that resulted in the purchase, by the state, of the Bovey properties in Virginia City and Nevada City, keeping the history and artifacts of Virginia and Nevada Cities accessible to future generations. Prior to his involvement in state politics, Ohs served from 1978 to 1984 on the Harrison, Montana school board. Running successfully for Lieutenant Governor in 2000 with gubernatorial candidate Judy Martz, Ohs was an active member of the administration, taking a leadership role is resolving complex or controversial issues facing the state including serving as chairman of the Governor's Drought Advisory Committee during drought years and chairing the K-12 Public School Renewal Commission working across party lines to solve the funding problems of Montana public schools.

Ohs was best known for his role in peacefully ending the Montana Freeman standoff near Jordan, Montana. In 1996, asked for help by a former ranch hand whose daughter and granddaughter were inside, Ohs served as principal negotiator making 19 separate trips into the Freeman compound. His involvement earned him the 1998 The Louis E. Peters Memorial Service Award given by the FBI for public service. His efforts also served as a model for FBI handling of similar situations and Ohs traveled to Washington, D.C. to help the FBI develop negotiator training programs based on his experiences.

== Later years ==
In 2002, Ohs was elected chairman of the National Lieutenant Governors Association. Following his four-year tenure as Lieutenant Governor, Ohs was elected chairman of the Montana Republican Party in 2005. Ohs chose not to seek the party post in 2007 due to his efforts to recover from surgery and chemotherapy for brain cancer. Ohs died of brain cancer on Sunday, November 25, 2007 at his home in Helena, Montana, aged 61. The Montana Law Enforcement Academy has dedicated a building to the late former Montana Lt. Gov. Karl Ohs.

== Personal life ==
Starting in 1996, he owned and operated several small businesses in southwest Montana. Ohs had four children: Brad, Eric, Brian and Elizabeth.

Political offices
| Preceded by Judy Martz | Lieutenant Governor of Montana; 2001–2005 | Succeeded by John Bohlinger |
