= Chet Blaylock =

American politician (1924–1996)

Member of the Montana Senate
- In office 1975–1995

Chairman of the Montana Democratic Party
- In office 1967–1969

Personal details
- Born: November 13, 1924 Joliet, Montana, U.S.
- Died: October 23, 1996 (aged 71) Deer Lodge, Montana, U.S.
- Party: Democratic
- Spouse: Mildred
- Education: Montana State University, Billings; University of Montana, Missoula (BA, MA)

Chester Merle Blaylock (November 13, 1924 – October 23, 1996) was an American politician from Montana. A Democrat, he served in the Montana Senate for twenty years. In 1996, he was the party's nominee for Governor of Montana against incumbent Marc Racicot, but died weeks before the election.

== Background ==
Blaylock served in the U.S. Navy during World War II. Later he was a teacher for 30 years in Laurel and Chinook, Montana. He was chairman of the state Democratic Party from 1967 to 1969. He was a delegate to the Montana state Constitutional Convention in 1972 and a member of the Montana State Senate from Laurel, Montana, elected in 1974 and retiring in 1994.

Blaylock experienced a series of health problems throughout his life, including a heart attack in 1980 and multiple types of cancer. On October 23, 1996, Blaylock was driving to Missoula, Montana, for a scheduled debate the following night, when he fell ill from another heart attack near Deer Lodge. He was taken to a hospital in Deer Lodge, where he died at the age of 71. His running mate, Judy Jacobson, continued unsuccessfully with his campaign. Blaylock was cremated and his ashes interred at Rockvale Cemetery in Rockvale, Montana.

== Legacy ==
=== State Record of Passing ===
On April 6, 1997, Fifty-fifth Legislative Assembly of the State of Montana officially recognized in the Senate Journal the passing of Chet Blaylock:

" WHEREAS, it is with deep and sincere sorrow that the members of the Senate of the Fifty-fifth Legislative Assembly of the State of Montana record the passing of Chet Blaylock on October 23, 1996. WHEREAS, it is fitting and proper that the record and accomplishments of the late Senator Blaylock be filed on the official records of this Assembly and the following facts relative to his career are hereby noted: Chet Blaylock was an educator. He believed that every Montana child was entitled to a free, quality education, a livable environment, a good job and affordable health care. He a spent a lifetime pursuing that objective. Born in Joliet November 13, 1924, he served in the Navy, earning four medals in the South Pacific, and returned to enter Eastern Montana College and later the University of Montana where he received B.S. and Master's degrees. He was chairman of the State Democratic Party and a delegate to the Montana Constitutional Convention. He was elected to the State Senate in 1974 and served continuously from 1975 to 1993. His last political campaign as the Democratic candidate for Governor of Montana, ended with his death on October 23, 1996. Senator Blaylock is survived by his widow, Mildred, and five children."

=== Chet Blaylock Memorial Scholarship Award ===
Offered at MSU-Billings, the Chet Blaylock Memorial Scholarship Award is a scholarship of $600. Recipients must be a full-time student enrolled for a minimum of 15 credits per semester; a graduate of a Montana high school; a Montana resident; have a high school GPA of 3.5 or above, university GPA of 3.25 or above; two letters of recommendation; and must be a student who shows "promise in a chosen field".

A large banner in Helena High School reads the quote: “Courage and gold are both rare; but courage, unlike gold, is seldom sought after.”—Chet Blaylock

Party political offices
Preceded by Dorothy Bradley	Democratic nominee for Governor of Montana; Deceased; 1996	Succeeded by Judy Jacobson
