= David Noriega Rodríguez =

Puerto Rican politician

At-Large Member of the Puerto Rico House of Representatives
- In office 1984–1996

Personal details
- Born: April 10, 1945 San Juan, Puerto Rico
- Died: May 4, 2013 (aged 68) San Juan, Puerto Rico
- Party: Movimiento Unión Soberanista (MUS); Puerto Rican Independence Party (PIP)
- Spouse: Carmen Costas
- Education: University of Puerto Rico (BA); University of Puerto Rico School of Law (JD)
- Occupation: Attorney, legislator, politician, political analyst

David Noriega Rodríguez (April 10, 1945 – May 4, 2013) was a Puerto Rican lawyer, politician, and political analyst. He was one of the most relevant political figures in Puerto Rico during the last two decades of the 20th century, when he was a member of the Puerto Rican Independence Party (PIP). Noriega ran for Governor of Puerto Rico at the 1996 general elections. Noriega became known as the "People's Prosecutor" because of his active role in pursuing government corruption. His legislative investigations led to the discovery of many political corruption scandals that he referred to the US Federal Government. In later years, Noriega served as a political analyst for various television and news programs.

== Early years and studies ==
David Noriega Rodríguez was born in 1945. His father was Elías Noriega Martínez. Noriega studied political science at the University of Puerto Rico. He then completed a degree in law.

== Political career ==
Noriega's political career began in the late 1960s, after being elected as president of the General Council of the University of Puerto Rico in the year 1967. He was also Secretary of the Youth of the PIP in 1968. Two years later, he was elected as Secretary of the party. In 1979, Noriega also served as Secretary of Legislative Affairs for the PIP, and in 1980 served as Electoral Commissioner.

Noriega was first elected to the House of Representatives at the 1984 general elections, and was reelected for two additional terms in 1988 and 1992. In all elections, he was the candidate with the most votes from all parties. As a member of the House of Representatives, Noriega was instrumental in exposing the corruption scandal in the AIDS Institute of San Juan.

Noriega was the gubernatorial candidate of the PIP in the 1996 general elections. He received 3.8% of the votes.

Because of differences with the leadership of the PIP, he resigned from the party in the late 1990s. Noriega was one of the voices that promoted abstention for the 1998 status referendum. This, despite the fact that the PIP gave his full support to a direct vote in favor of independence.

== Fight against corruption ==
During the late 1990s, Noriega became renowned for his work in the famous case of the "carpetas". The "carpetas" were secret dossiers on independence supporters that were maintained by local police with help from federal authorities. These dossiers were used as instruments of persecution against those who sought political independence for the island. Noriega was one of the plaintiffs in the case held against the Government of Puerto Rico. The lawsuit led to the opening of the files and passage of legislation banning such ideological persecution.

In the first years of the 2000s, Noriega was named by Governor Sila María Calderón Serra (of the Popular Democratic Party) to head the "Comisión Independiente de Ciudadanos para Evaluar Transacciones Gubernamentales", also called as the Blue-Ribbon Commission, to investigate government corruption.

== Later years ==
Noriega later returned to his practice of law, and also served as a political analyst in Puerto Rican radio and news programs.

During his last years, Noriega was one of the founders of the Movimiento Unión Soberanista, a new party promoting the sovereignty of Puerto Rico. He also served as member of the board of directors of the party which participated in the 2012 general elections.

== Personal life ==
Noriega was married to Carmencita Costas. They had three children together: Rebeca, David, and Javier.

== Illness and death ==
On March 26, 2013, Noriega confirmed that he was suffering from cancer, and was undergoing treatment for it. He died of pancreatic cancer in the morning of May 4, 2013. As a result, Governor Alejandro García Padilla declared two days of mourning.
