= Judy Jacobson =

American author and politician (1939–2019)

Member of the Montana Senate from the 42nd district
- In office January 1981 – January 1997

Personal details
- Born: February 26, 1939 South Bend, Indiana, U.S.
- Died: June 20, 2019 (aged 80) Butte, Montana, U.S.
- Party: Democratic
- Spouse: John Jacobson
- Children: 3
- Education: University of Wisconsin, Madison (attended); Montana Technological University (BS)

Judy Jacobson (February 26, 1939 – June 20, 2019) was an American author and politician who served as a Democratic member of the Montana Legislature. She was elected to Montana State Senate District 42 and served from 1981 to 1996, and was the first female Senator serving Silver Bow County.

== Early life and education ==
On February 26, 1939, Jacobson was born in South Bend, Indiana. Jacobson attended and studied social work at the University of Wisconsin. In 1995, Jacobson earned a Bachelor of Science degree from Montana Technological University.

== Career ==
In 1981, Jacobson served in the Montana Senate District 41.

On January 12, 1996, Jacobson was announced as the running mate of Chet Blaylock for the 1996 Montana gubernatorial election. However, on October 23, 1996, Blaylock died of a heart attack, and the Montana Democratic Party selected Jacobson as his replacement, therefore becoming both the gubernatorial nominee and the lieutenant gubernatorial nominee. Winning 79.2% of the vote, ultimately, however, Marc Racicot was able to defeat Jacobson in a landslide to win re-election to his second and final term as governor.

In 2000, Jacobson became the first woman Chief Executive of Butte-Silver Bow in Montana.

== Works ==
- 1997 Montana Almanc. Co-author with Andrea Merrill. Published by Falcon Press Publishing.

== Personal life ==
Jacobson's husband was John Jacobson, a physician. In 1973, Jacobson and her family moved to Butte, Montana. Jacobson had three children. On June 20, 2019, Jacobson died in Butte at 80 years of age.

Party political offices
Preceded by Chet Blaylock; Deceased	Democratic nominee for Governor of Montana; 1996	Succeeded by Mark O'Keefe
