= Judy Martz =

American politician and speed skater (1943–2017)

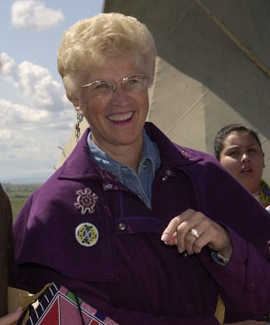
- Martz in 2003

22nd Governor of Montana
- In office January 1, 2001 – January 3, 2005
- Lieutenant: Karl Ohs
- Preceded by: Marc Racicot
- Succeeded by: Brian Schweitzer

31st Lieutenant Governor of Montana
- In office January 6, 1997 – January 1, 2001
- Governor: Marc Racicot
- Preceded by: Denny Rehberg
- Succeeded by: Karl Ohs

Personal details
- Born: Judith Helen Morstein; July 28, 1943 Big Timber, Montana, U.S.
- Died: October 30, 2017 (aged 74) Butte, Montana, U.S.
- Party: Republican
- Spouse: Harry Martz (m. 1965)
- Children: 2
- Education: Montana State University Billings

Judith Helen Martz (née Morstein; July 28, 1943 – October 30, 2017) was an American politician, businesswoman, and Olympian speed skater who served as the 22nd governor of Montana from 2001 to 2005. A member of the Republican Party, she was the first woman to hold the office. She previously served as the 31st Lieutenant Governor of Montana from 1997 to 2001 under the governorship of Marc Racicot.

== Early life and education ==
Martz was born July 28, 1943, in Big Timber, Montana, as Judith Helen Morstein. Her father was a miner and rancher, and her mother was, at various times, a cook, liquor-store clerk and motel maid. Morstein graduated from Butte High School in 1961 and attended Eastern Montana College.

== Career ==
Morstein was named Miss Rodeo Montana in 1962. She competed on the U.S. women's speed skating team at the 1964 Winter Olympics (1500 meters). She was one of the first two Montana women to appear in the Olympics.

Morstein married Harry Martz in 1965; she and her husband owned and operated a garbage disposal service in Butte, Montana.

Martz helped to establish the U.S. High Altitude Speed Skating Center in Butte. She also worked as a field representative for Republican U.S. Sen. Conrad Burns from 1989 to 1995.

Gov. Marc Racicot appointed Martz as lieutenant governor of Montana in 1995 after her predecessor, Denny Rehberg, stepped down to run for U.S. Senate. Martz was the first female lieutenant governor in the state's history. In 1996, Martz was elected lieutenant governor as Racicot's running mate.

=== Governor of Montana ===
==== 2000 Montana gubernatorial election ====
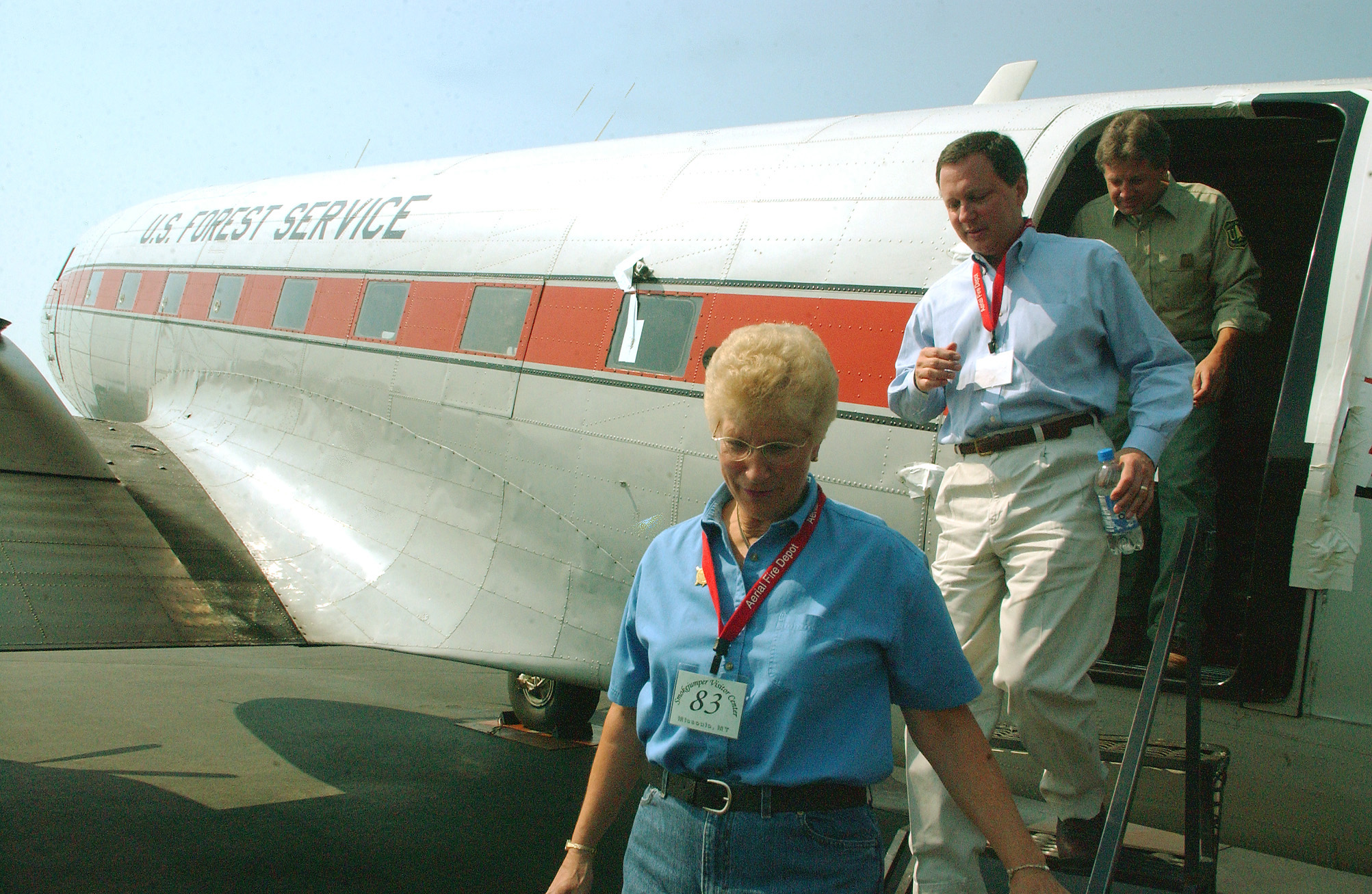
Montana Governor Judy Martz, FEMA Director Michael Brown and Bob Beckley of the Forest Service tour a smokejumper plane in Missoula, Sept. 2003

In the Montana gubernatorial election of 2000, Martz won the Republican primary over conservative activist and University of Montana law professor Rob Natelson 57 percent to 43 percent. She went on to defeat her Democratic opponent, State Auditor Mark O'Keefe, in the general election by a margin of 51 percent to 47 percent despite being outspent by a three-to-one margin. Martz's running mate was Karl Ohs.

==== Tenure (2001–2005) ====
Martz was Montana's first female governor.

Martz "was noted for turning a state deficit into a surplus while reducing taxes and increasing funding for education. However, her term was besieged by missteps. Her popularity dropped to 20 percent at its low point".

In August 2001, the Montana Democratic Party filed an ethics complaint alleging that Martz violated state law by buying land from Atlantic Richfield Co. (Arco) in 1999 at a much lower price than Arco had paid for the property two years earlier. Following a hearing, the political practices commissioner issued a September 2002 decision clearing Martz.

Martz's chief policy adviser, Shane Hedges, was involved in an automobile accident near Marysville, Montana, in August 2001. Hedges was driving while intoxicated. Following the accident, Hedges went to Martz's residence, where she washed his clothes. House Majority Leader Paul Sliter died in the crash. Hedges promptly resigned and pleaded guilty to a charge of negligent homicide.

Martz announced that she would not run for re-election as governor in 2004. She finished her time in office campaigning for President Bush in Ohio, Arizona, and other swing states, and sparring with incoming Democratic governor Brian Schweitzer over the state government transition.

=== Later career ===
In September 2005, Martz was named chair of Montanans for Judge Roberts, a group supportive of Supreme Court nominee John Roberts, and spoke at a rally in support of Roberts. She also sat on the boards of Maternal Life International, University of Montana Western, Big Sky State Games, and TASER International, a company that manufacturers non-lethal electrical shock equipment for law enforcement, the military, and private individuals.

After leaving office, Martz "routinely addressed Christian organizations throughout the country and was part of a network that prays at locations across Montana".

== Personal life ==
Martz and her husband, Harry, were married in 1965. They had two children: Justin and Stacey Jo. Martz was a Christian.

In May 2003, Martz was referenced in news for a perceived similarity to the face and hair of a nude bordello dancer sculpted by Seattle artist Kristine Veith, and placed in a new development in downtown Helena. Both Martz and Veith denied the similarity, with Martz stating, possibly partially tongue-in-cheek, "I'm a very modest person, no one would ever see me like that. My husband doesn't ever see me like that".

On November 11, 2014, it was announced that Martz had stage II pancreatic cancer and was undergoing treatment in Arizona. She died of the disease on October 30, 2017, in Butte, Montana, at the age of 74.

== Electoral history ==
Montana gubernatorial election, 2000
Party	Candidate	Votes	%	±%
Republican	Judy Martz	209,135	50.98%	−28.18%
Democratic	Mark O'Keefe	193,131	47.08%	+26.25%
Libertarian	Stan Jones	7,926	1.93%	
Majority		16,004	3.90%	−54.43%
Turnout		410,192		
Republican hold		Swing		

== See also ==
- List of female governors in the United States
- List of female lieutenant governors in the United States

Political offices
Preceded by Denny Rehberg	Lieutenant Governor of Montana; 1997–2001	Succeeded by Karl Ohs
Preceded by Marc Racicot	Governor of Montana; 2001–2005	Succeeded by Brian Schweitzer
Party political offices
Preceded by Marc Racicot	Republican nominee for Governor of Montana; 2000	Succeeded by Bob Brown
