= Marc Racicot =

American attorney, politician and former Governor of Montana

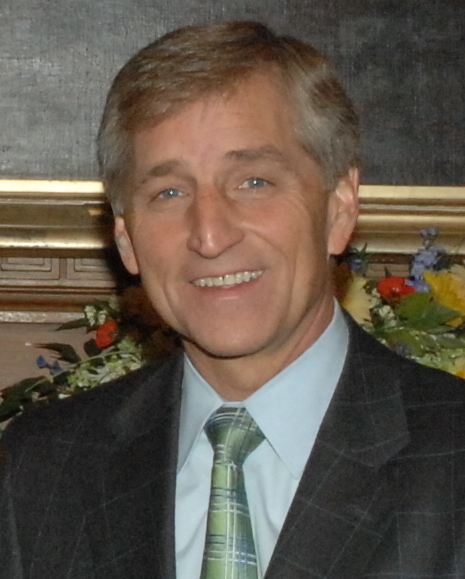
- Racicot in 2008

Chair of the Republican National Committee
- In office December 5, 2001 – July 25, 2003
- Preceded by: Jim Gilmore
- Succeeded by: Ed Gillespie

21st Governor of Montana
- In office January 4, 1993 – January 1, 2001
- Lieutenant: Denny Rehberg; Judy Martz
- Preceded by: Stan Stephens
- Succeeded by: Judy Martz

20th Attorney General of Montana
- In office January 2, 1989 – January 4, 1993
- Governor: Stan Stephens
- Preceded by: Mike Greely
- Succeeded by: Joseph Mazurek

Personal details
- Born: July 24, 1948 (age 78) Thompson Falls, Montana, U.S.
- Party: Republican
- Spouse: Theresa Barber
- Children: 5
- Education: Carroll College (BA); University of Montana, Missoula (JD)

Military service
- Branch/service: United States Army
- Years of service: 1973–1976
- Rank: Captain
- Unit: Army Judge Advocate General's Corps

Marc Racicot (/ˈrɑːskoʊ/; born July 24, 1948) is an American attorney, lobbyist, and former Republican politician who served as the 21st governor of Montana from 1993 until 2001. After leaving office, Racicot worked as a lobbyist for the law firm Bracewell & Giuliani. His notable clients included Enron, Burlington Northern Santa Fe, and the Recording Industry Association of America.

He was chairman of the Republican National Committee from 2001 until 2003, when he was appointed as the chairman of the Bush re-election campaign. In 2000 as well as 2004 he was rumored to be Bush's choice for United States Attorney General. During the 2000 election, some saw him as a possible running mate for Bush. The Washington Post described him as "one of Bush's closest friends and advisers". Racicot has been harshly critical of Donald Trump, and endorsed Joe Biden over Trump in the 2020 United States presidential election. This led to the Montana Republican Party censuring him in 2023, and declaring that they no longer considered him a Republican.

== Early life and education ==
Racicot was born in Thompson Falls, Montana. His ancestors came to the Montana Territory in the 1860s. Marc's grandfather arrived in Libby, Montana, in 1917 to work as a logging camp cook in northwestern Montana for J. Neils Lumber Company. Marc Racicot was born to Bill and Pat Racicot on July 24, 1948. He was raised in Miles City, Montana, and Libby. His parents owned a foster home. His father was also a teacher, high school basketball coach, and track coach. He graduated from Libby High School. Racicot received a bachelor's degree in English from Carroll College in 1970. He was a starting basketball player in high school as well at Carroll College. He earned a J.D. degree in 1973 from the University of Montana School of Law in Missoula, Montana.

== Career ==
Racicot had previously been an Army ROTC graduate. He attended The JAG School at the University of Virginia and entered U.S. Army JAG Corps. He was immediately assigned as a prosecutor in the Army JAG Corps from 1973 to 1976. He was stationed in West Germany where he served as Chief Prosecutor for the largest U.S. military jurisdiction in Europe. While there, he also taught business and criminal law for the University of Maryland. After three years, he was discharged from the Army as a captain and returned to Montana in 1976.

He became the deputy county attorney for Missoula County from 1976 to 1977. After that, he became a special prosecutor for Montana statewide in 1977, and served in that position until 1988. During this time, he had a conviction rate of 95%. He lost only two cases in twelve years. He convicted Don and Dan Nichols, who both abducted Kari Swenson, an Olympic athlete, and murdered a would-be rescuer. In May 1985, Dan Nichols was sentenced to 20 years for kidnapping and assault. In September 1985, Don Nichols was sentenced to 85 years for kidnapping, murder, and aggravated assault. In 1980 he ran for chief justice of the Montana Supreme Court, but was unsuccessful. He also ran for district judge in Lewis & Clark County in 1982 and Broadwater County in 1984, but lost both elections.

Racicot was the special prosecutor in the 1984 murder trial of Barry Beach, who was convicted of killing teenager Kim Nees near Poplar, Montana, in 1979, at age 17, and was sentenced to life without parole. Beach maintains that he is innocent and that his confession was coerced, while Racicot is convinced of his guilt. Beach's appeals were unsuccessful, with the Montana Supreme Court rejecting a bid to overturn his conviction by a 4–3 vote. Beach's petitions for clemency to the state Board of Pardons and Parole were opposed by Racicot, but supported by other prominent Montanans, such as Jon Tester and Brian Schweitzer. At a clemency hearing, Racicot acknowledged that law enforcement had created a "mess" by contaminating the crime scene, but testified that Beach's detailed confession was strong evidence of his guilt, and disputed the plausibility of alternate accounts of Nees' murder.

== Attorney General of Montana ==
In 1988, he ran for Attorney General of Montana. He defeated Democratic nominee Mike McGrath, the Lewis and Clark County Attorney, 52%-48%. He served as attorney general until January 1993.

== Governor of Montana ==
=== Elections ===
In 1992, incumbent Governor Stan Stephens declined to run due to health problems. Racicot decided to run and easily won the Republican primary by defeating Andy Bennett 69%-31%. He won every county in the state. He then competed with Democratic State Representative Dorothy Bradley of Bozeman. Both candidates called for a 4% sales tax, but differed on how to spend such a tax. Racicot defeated her 51%-49%, a difference of 10,980 votes.

In 1996, Racicot ran for re-election. He easily defeated Rob Natelson in the Republican primary, 76%-24%. He was challenged in the general election by long-time state State Senator Chet Blaylock. Polls showed that Racicot maintained a sizable lead over Blaylock during the campaign. A few weeks before the election however, Blaylock unexpectedly died of a heart attack on the way to a debate. Reluctantly, his little known running mate, Judy Jacobson continued the drive but had little time to launch her own campaign. Because the election was so near, the voting ballots could only be changed to show Jacobson running for both governor and lieutenant governor. In one of the largest margins in state history, Racicot defeated Jacobson, 79%–21%, winning every county in the state.

=== Tenure ===
As governor, Racicot was described as fiscally conservative and "an advocate for deregulation and business interests". After working with the Montana State Legislature to eliminate the $200 million deficit in 1993, the Racicot Administration produced a $22.4 million budget surplus the year after. They used the surplus to cut taxes. He approved legislation that deregulated the utility sector in Montana. This legislation was sought by the Montana Power Company, the major utility supplier in the state. Following passage, the Montana Power Company divested itself of its utility operations and became a telecommunications company. The company filed for bankruptcy a few years later. The final result of this sweeping deregulation of Montana's utilities was a drastic rise in rates for most of the power customers in Montana. Workers with pensions from Montana Power were suddenly left without income.

== Candidacy and early Presidency of George W. Bush ==
Racicot was one of the earliest supporters of George W. Bush for President, and was a very effective spokesman for the Bush campaign in the recount debacle. In addition, Racicot was Bush's first choice for U.S. Attorney General, but he took himself off the list for personal reasons.

== Chairman of the RNC ==
On December 5, 2001, President George W. Bush announced that he would nominate Racicot, a strong Bush ally, to become the chairman of the Republican National Committee. In order to be elected chairman, he severed ties to lobbying organizations that were connected to Enron. On January 18, 2002, the 165-member RNC unanimously elected Racicot.

Racicot was extremely successful as the Republican party performed very well in the 2002 midterm elections. Republicans took control of the U.S. Senate, making Bill Frist the Senate Majority Leader. In the wake of the McCain–Feingold finance reform, the RNC raised a record-$250 million in soft money.

In January 2003, he decided to resign to become chairman of Bush's 2004 re-election campaign. Bush appointed Ed Gillespie as the next chairman of the RNC.

== 2004 presidential election ==
Racicot was the chairman of Bush's re-election campaign from 2003 to 2004, the entire election cycle. He said of his job: "I'm just a utility infielder." Racicot called Bush's opponent, U.S. Senator John Kerry, "out of the mainstream" and dismissed all polls suggesting Kerry would win. He also said Kerry's "record on defense and intelligence funding is not defensible."

Bush won re-election to a second term, defeating Kerry 51%-48%.

== Later life and career ==
Racicot was president of the American Insurance Association (AIA), an insurance industry lobbying group from June 13, 2005 to February 1, 2009.

He is a member of the board of directors of MassMutual, Weyerhaeuser and Jobs for America's Graduates, He was formerly a member of the board of visitors for the University of Montana School of Law. He is also a past member of the board of directors of the Corporation for National and Community Service and United Way, and was a member of the Carroll College Board of Trustees.

He is a former partner at the Texas-based law firm Bracewell & Giuliani.

=== Political views ===
Racicot has criticized the Supreme Court ruling in Citizens United v. FEC (2010), saying it has led to "obscene" levels of fundraising from "third-party groups", and worsened American political discourse, alongside social media.

Racicot has been a staunch critic of Donald Trump, whom he has called "a scourge on America". During the 2016 election, he wrote an op-ed in The Washington Post in which he said, "Trump has demonstrated neither [...] qualities of principled leadership, nor offered any substantive or serious conservative policy proposals consistent with historical Republican Party platform positions." In 2020, he vocally supported Joe Biden over Trump. Racicot has refused to endorse Republican candidates who have backed Trump; in 2022, he declined to endorse Ryan Zinke, a former secretary of the interior under Trump, in his bid for the U.S. Congress, saying that he "enable[d Trump]". In 2023, the Montana Republican State Central Committee passed a resolution rebuking Racicot, saying that they no longer considered him a Republican due to his opposition to Trump. In 2024, he endorsed Jon Tester over Trump-backed Tim Sheehy in the U.S. Senate election. In 2026 he endorsed Sam Forstag over Trump backed Aaron Flint and endorsed Seth Bodnar over Trump backed Kurt Alme in the 2026 Senate race.

== Personal life ==
Racicot lives in Missoula, Montana as of 2023. He and his wife, Theresa, have five children.

== In popular culture ==
In early April 1996, Racicot gained national attention when he playfully sparred with host Jay Leno of The Tonight Show in a bid to rebut Montana's new image as a refuge for criminals and kooks. Racicot was loose and wisecracking while recording a two-to-three-minute comedy segment with Leno from the governor's office. He followed cue cards that set up responses from Leno in "The Tonight Show" studio. "Every state has its positives and negatives, governor," Leno said in the working script. "And to prove that, I thought you and I would compare the state of California with Montana." Racicot then made a series of comments about Montana, and Leno responded with comparisons to California. Among the back and forth:

Racicot: "Montana, Big Sky Country."

Leno: "California, brown sky country!"

Racicot: "Montana, where the deer and the antelope roam free."

Leno: "California, where O.J. (Simpson) still roams free!"

== Electoral history ==
Montana Attorney general Election 1988
Party	Candidate	Votes	%	±%
Republican	Marc Racicot	188,825	52.35	
Democratic	Mike McGrath	171,887	47.65	

Montana Gubernatorial Election 1992
Party	Candidate	Votes	%	±%
Republican	Marc Racicot	209,401	51.35	
Democratic	Dorothy Bradley	198,421	48.65	

Montana Gubernatorial Election 1996
Party	Candidate	Votes	%	±%
Republican	Marc Racicot (incumbent)	320,768	79.17	
Democratic	Judy Jacobson	84,407	20.83	

Legal offices
Preceded by Mike Greely	Attorney General of Montana; 1989–1993	Succeeded by Joseph P. Mazurek
Political offices
Preceded by Stan Stephens	Governor of Montana; 1993–2001	Succeeded by Judy Martz
Party political offices
Preceded by Stan Stephens	Republican nominee for Governor of Montana; 1992, 1996	Succeeded by Judy Martz
Preceded by Jim Gilmore	Chair of the Republican National Committee; 2001–2003	Succeeded by Ed Gillespie
U.S. order of precedence (ceremonial)
Preceded by Martha McSally as Former U.S. Senator	Order of precedence of the United States; Within Montana	Succeeded by Brian Schweitzer as Former Governor
Preceded by Dennis Daugaard as Former Governor	Order of precedence of the United States; Outside Montana	Succeeded by Brian Schweitzer as Former Governor
