= 1992 United States gubernatorial elections =

- November 3, 1992

14 governorships 12 states; 2 territories
	Majority party	Minority party
Party	Democratic	Republican
Seats before	28	20
Seats after	30	18
Seat change	▲2	▼2
Popular vote	7,038,490	5,538,502
Percentage	53.83%	42.36%
Seats up	6	6
Seats won	8	4
- Democratic gain Democratic hold Republican gain Republican hold New Progressive gain Nonpartisan

United States gubernatorial elections were held on November 3, 1992, in 12 states and two territories. Going into the elections, six of the seats were held by Democrats and six by Republicans. After the elections, Democrats held eight seats and Republicans held four. The elections coincided with the presidential election.

This was the last time where Rhode Island held a gubernatorial election in the same year as the presidential election. The length of gubernatorial terms for Rhode Island's governor would be extended from two to four years, with elections taking place in midterm election years. It was also the last time where the Democrats won or retained control of at least 30 governorships until 2026.

This is the only slate of seats in the overall 1992 election cycle where Democrats retained their majority and scored a net gain; in Congress, Democrats lost 9 seats in the House of Representatives, and neither party netted gains in the Senate, despite Bill Clinton defeating Republican George H. W. Bush and Independent Ross Perot on the same night.

== Election results ==
=== States ===
State	Incumbent	Party	First elected	Result	Candidates
Delaware	Mike Castle	Republican	1984	Incumbent term-limited. New governor elected. Democratic gain.	✓ Tom Carper (Democratic) 64.7%; B. Gary Scott (Republican) 32.7%; Floyd E. McDowell (A Delaware Party) 1.4%; Richard A. Cohen (Libertarian) 1.1%
Indiana	Evan Bayh	Democratic	1988	Incumbent re-elected.	✓ Evan Bayh (Democratic) 62.0%; Linley E. Pearson (Republican) 36.9%; Mary Barton (New Alliance) 1.1%
Missouri	John Ashcroft	Republican	1984	Incumbent term-limited. New governor elected. Democratic gain.	✓ Mel Carnahan (Democratic) 58.7%; William L. Webster (Republican) 41.3%
Montana	Stan Stephens	Republican	1988	Incumbent retired. New governor elected. Republican hold.	✓ Marc Racicot (Republican) 51.3%; Dorothy Bradley (Democratic) 48.6%
New Hampshire	Judd Gregg	Republican	1988	Incumbent retired to run for U.S. Senator. New governor elected. Republican hold.	✓ Steve Merrill (Republican) 56.0%; Deborah Arnie Arnesen (Democratic) 40.0%; Miriam Luce (Libertarian) 4.0%
North Carolina	James G. Martin	Republican	1984	Incumbent term-limited. New governor elected. Democratic gain.	✓ Jim Hunt (Democratic) 52.7%; Jim Gardner (Republican) 43.2%; Scott McLaughlin (Libertarian) 4.0%
North Dakota	George A. Sinner	Democratic–NPL	1984	Incumbent retired. New governor elected. Republican gain.	✓ Ed Schafer (Republican) 56.0%; Nicholas Spaeth (Democratic-NPL) 39.3%
Rhode Island	Bruce Sundlun	Democratic	1990	Incumbent re-elected.	✓ Bruce Sundlun (Democratic) 61.6%; Elizabeth A. Leonard (Republican) 34.3%; Joseph F. Devine (Independent) 3.4%
Utah	Norman H. Bangerter	Republican	1984	Incumbent retired. New governor elected. Republican hold.	✓ Mike Leavitt (Republican) 42.2%; Merrill Cook (Independent) 33.5%; Stewart Hanson (Democratic) 23.2%
Vermont	Howard Dean	Democratic	1991 (Note: Dean took office after his predecessor (Richard Snelling) died.)	Incumbent elected to full term.	✓ Howard Dean (Democratic) 74.7%; John McClaughry (Republican) 23.0%; Richard F. Gottlieb (Liberty Union) 1.1%; August Jaccaci (Natural Law) 1.0%
Washington	Booth Gardner	Democratic	1984	Incumbent retired. New governor elected. Democratic hold.	✓ Mike Lowry (Democratic) 52.2%; Ken Eikenberry (Republican) 47.8%
West Virginia	Gaston Caperton	Democratic	1988	Incumbent re-elected.	✓ Gaston Caperton (Democratic) 56.0%; Cleve Benedict (Republican) 36.6%; Charlotte Pritt (Write-in) 7.4%

=== Territories ===
Territory	Incumbent	Party	First elected	Result	Candidates
American Samoa	Peter Tali Coleman	Republican	1988	Incumbent lost re-election. New governor elected. Democratic gain.	✓ A. P. Lutali (Democratic) 53.0%; Peter Tali Coleman (Republican) 36.0%
Puerto Rico	Rafael Hernández Colón	Popular Democratic	1984	Incumbent retired. New governor elected. New Progressive gain.	✓ Pedro Rosselló (PNP) 49.9%; Victoria Muñoz Mendoza (PPD) 45.9%; Fernando Martín García (PIP) 4.2%

== Closest races ==
States where the margin of victory was under 5%:

1. Montana, 2.7%
2. Puerto Rico, 4.0%
3. Washington, 4.3%

States where the margin of victory was under 10%:

1. Utah, 8.6%
2. North Carolina, 9.5%

== Delaware ==
1992 Delaware gubernatorial election
- November 3, 1992
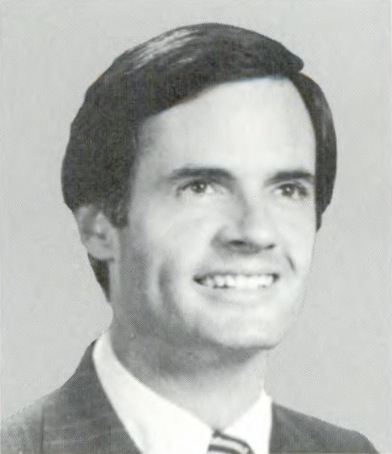

Nominee	Tom Carper	B. Gary Scott
Party	Democratic	Republican
Running mate	Ruth Ann Minner	Sherman N. Miller
Popular vote	179,365	90,725
Percentage	64.7%	32.8%
- Carper: 50–60% 60–70% 70–80% 80–90%
Governor before election
Dale E. Wolf
Republican
Elected Governor
Tom Carper
Democratic

The 1992 Delaware gubernatorial election took place on November 3, 1992. Incumbent Republican governor Mike Castle, barred by term limits from seeking another term as Governor of Delaware, instead sought election to the United States House of Representatives. Congressman and Democratic nominee Tom Carper defeated Republican nominee B. Gary Scott in a landslide, winning his first term in office and becoming Delaware's first Democratic governor since 1977.

== Indiana ==
1992 Indiana gubernatorial election
- November 3, 1992
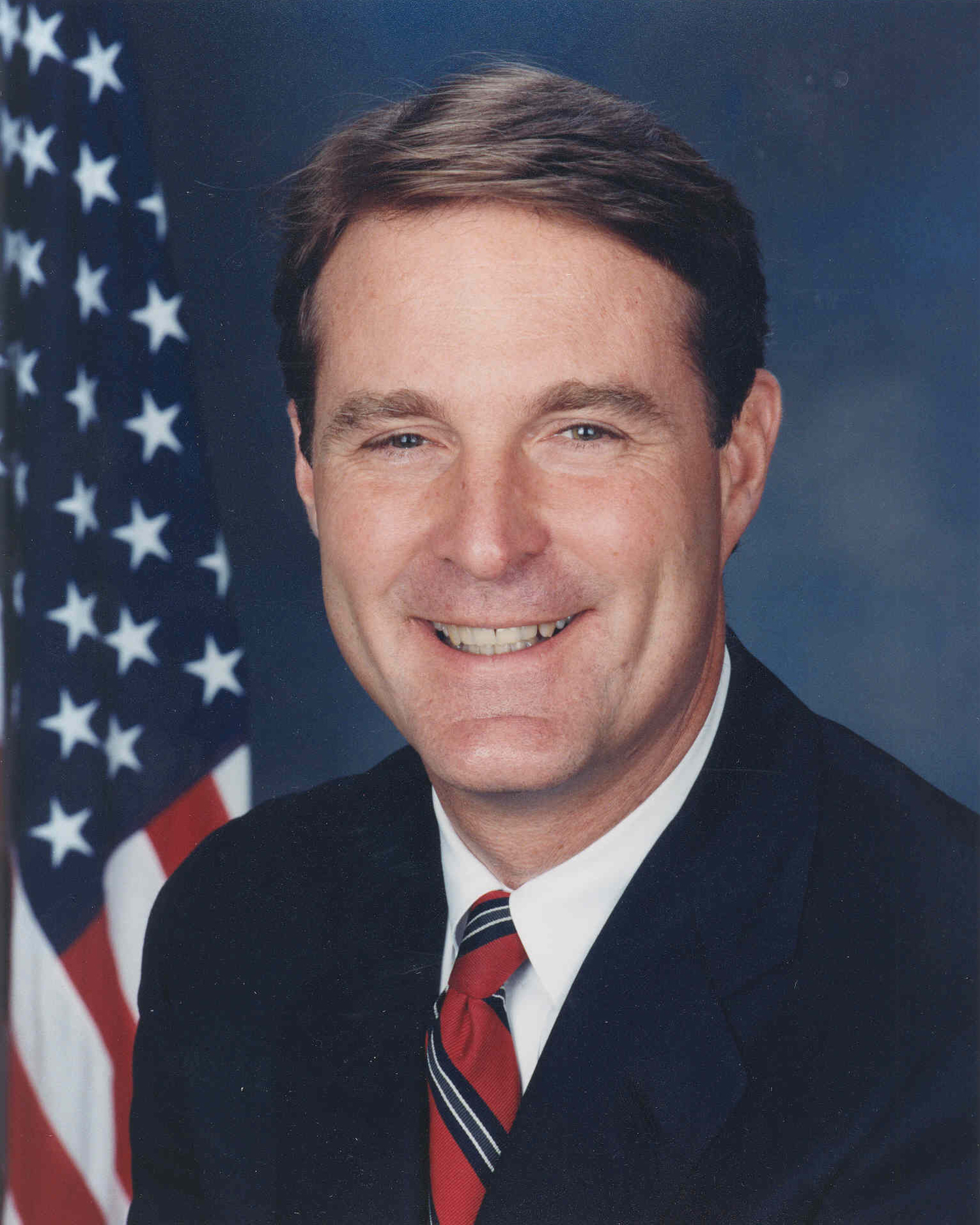

Nominee	Evan Bayh	Linley E. Pearson
Party	Democratic	Republican
Running mate	Frank O'Bannon	Robert D. Green
Popular vote	1,382,151	822,533
Percentage	62.0%	36.9%
- County results Bayh: 50–60% 60–70% 70–80% Pearson: 40–50% 50–60%
Governor before election
Evan Bayh
Democratic
Elected Governor
Evan Bayh
Democratic

The 1992 Indiana gubernatorial election was held on November 3, 1992. Incumbent Governor Evan Bayh, a Democrat, won reelection over his Republican challenger, Linley E. Pearson with 62% of the vote. He was the first Democratic governor of Indiana to win reelection since governors became eligible for election to consecutive terms in office in 1972.

== Missouri ==
1992 Missouri gubernatorial election
- November 3, 1992
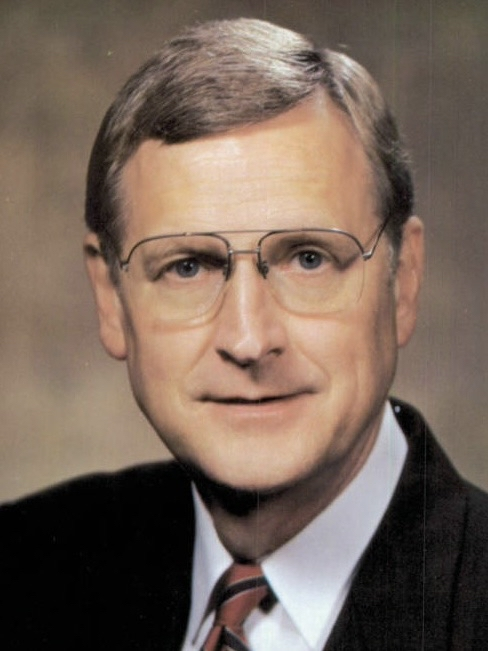

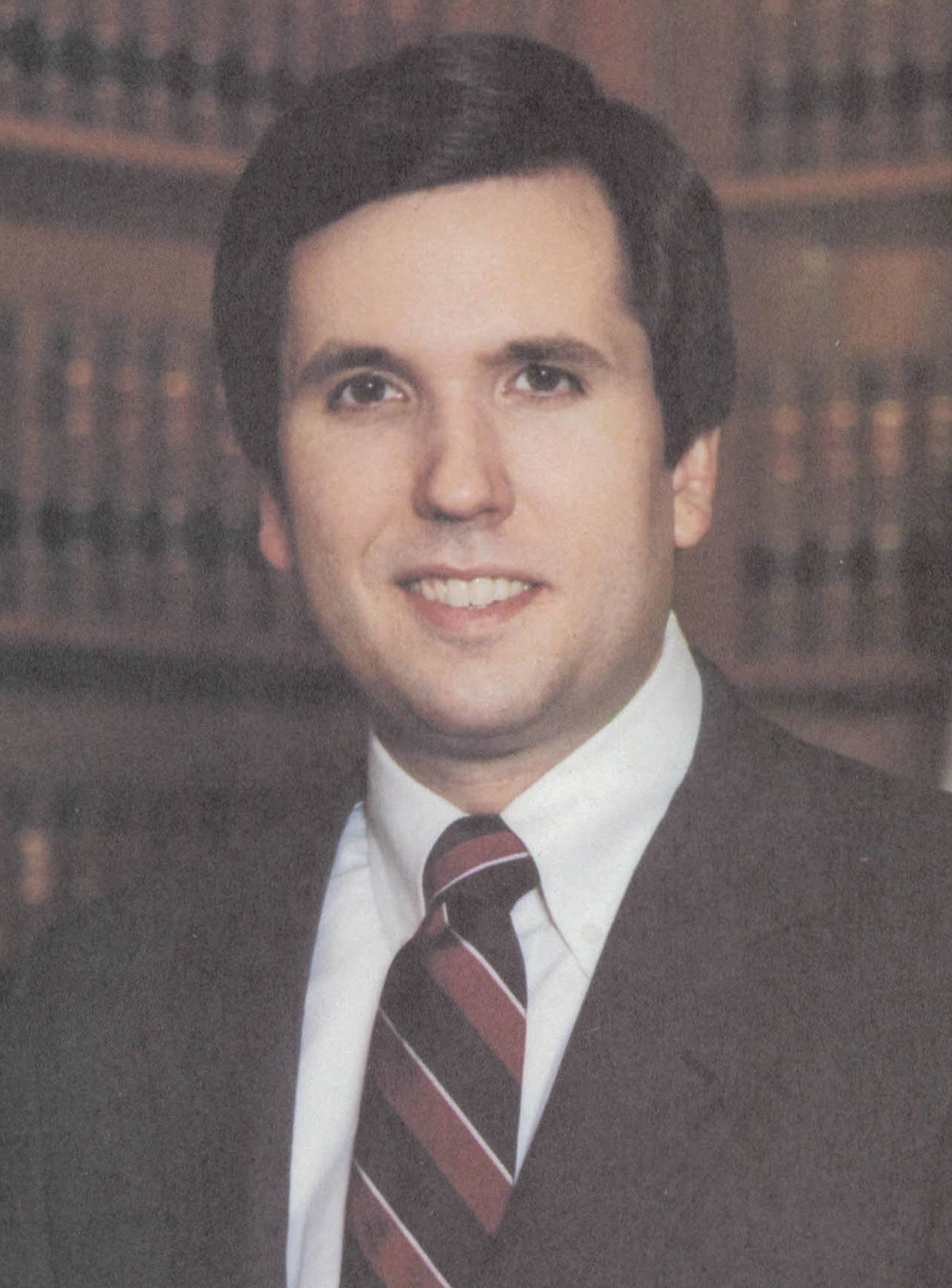
Nominee	Mel Carnahan	William L. Webster
Party	Democratic	Republican
Popular vote	1,375,425	968,574
Percentage	58.7%	41.3%
- County results Carnahan: 50–60% 60–70% 70–80% Webster: 50-60% 60-70% Tie: 50–50%
Governor before election
John Ashcroft
Republican
Elected Governor
Mel Carnahan
Democratic

The 1992 Missouri gubernatorial election was held on November 3, 1992, and resulted in a victory for the Democratic nominee, Lt. Governor Mel Carnahan, over the Republican candidate, Missouri Attorney General William L. Webster, and Libertarian Joan Dow. Carnahan had defeated St. Louis mayor Vincent C. Schoemehl for the Democratic nomination, while Webster had defeated Secretary of State Roy Blunt and Treasurer Wendell Bailey for the Republican nomination.

== Montana ==
1992 Montana gubernatorial election
- November 3, 1992
- Turnout: 78.90%▲3.90
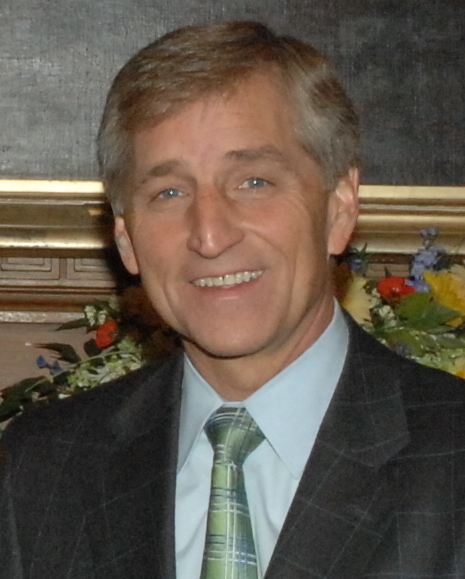

Nominee	Marc Racicot	Dorothy Bradley
Party	Republican	Democratic
Running mate	Denny Rehberg	Mike Halligan
Popular vote	209,401	198,421
Percentage	51.3%	48.7%
- County results Racicot: 50–60% 60–70% 70–80% Bradley: 50–60% 60–70% 70–80%
Governor before election
Stan Stephens
Republican
Elected Governor
Marc Racicot
Republican

The 1992 Montana gubernatorial election took place on November 3, 1992. Incumbent Governor of Montana Stan Stephens, who was first elected in 1988, declined to seek re-election. Marc Racicot, the Attorney General of Montana, won the Republican primary and advanced to the general election, where he faced State Representative Dorothy Bradley, who had emerged from a crowded Democratic primary as the nominee of her party. A close election ensued, but in the end, Racicot ended up defeating Bradley to win his first of two terms as governor. While on the same ballot, Democratic presidential candidate Bill Clinton won the state of Montana, and eventually won the 1992 United States presidential election.

== New Hampshire ==
1992 New Hampshire gubernatorial election
- November 3, 1992
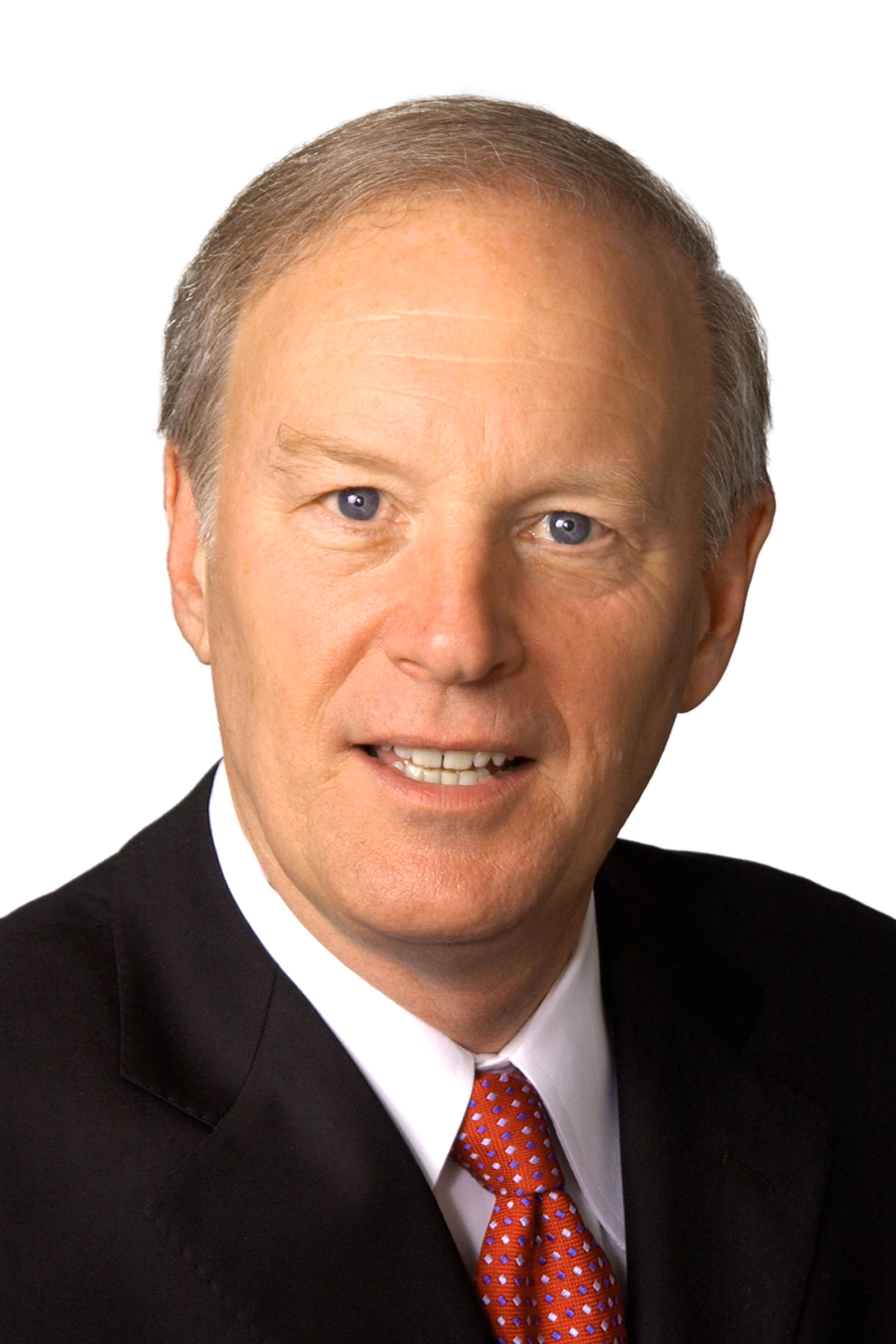

Nominee	Steve Merrill	Deborah Arnie Arnesen
Party	Republican	Democratic
Popular vote	289,170	206,232
Percentage	56.02%	39.95%
- Merrill: 40–50% 50–60% 60–70% 70–80% >90% Arnesen: 40–50% 50–60% 60–70% 70–80% >90%
Governor before election
Judd Gregg
Republican
Elected Governor
Steve Merrill
Republican

The 1992 New Hampshire gubernatorial election took place on November 3, 1992. Republican nominee Steve Merrill, who defeated Ed Dupont and Liz Hager for the Republican nomination, won the election, defeating Deborah Arnie Arnesen, who had defeated Norman D'Amours for the Democratic nomination.

== North Carolina ==
1992 North Carolina gubernatorial election
- November 3, 1992
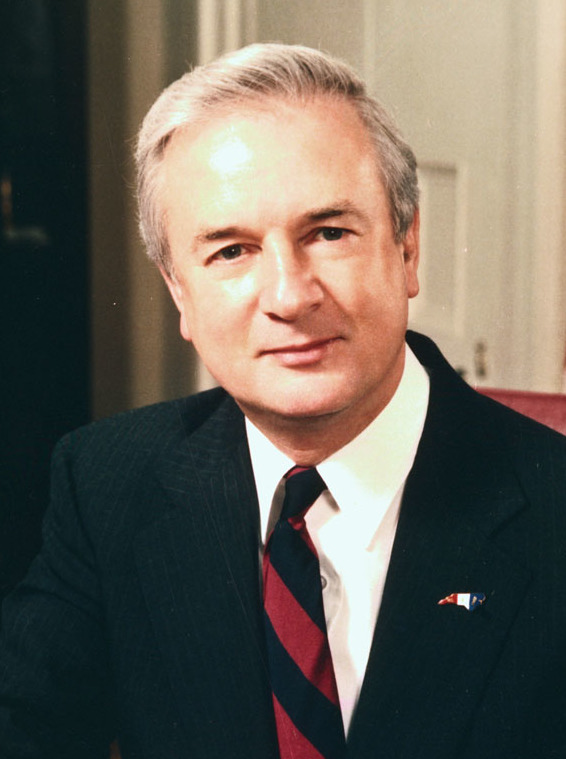

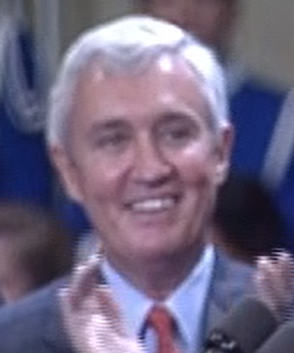
Nominee	Jim Hunt	Jim Gardner
Party	Democratic	Republican
Popular vote	1,368,246	1,121,955
Percentage	52.72%	43.23%
- County results Hunt: 40–50% 50–60% 60–70% 70–80% Gardner: 40–50% 50–60% 60–70%
Governor before election
James G. Martin
Republican
Elected Governor
Jim Hunt
Democratic

The 1992 North Carolina gubernatorial election was held on November 3, 1992. Incumbent Governor James G. Martin was unable to run for a third consecutive term due to term limits, and his Lieutenant Governor, Jim Gardner, was chosen to replace him as the Republican nominee. Gardner had also been the nominee in a previous gubernatorial election over twenty years earlier. Former Governor Jim Hunt decided to seek his third term as the Democratic nominee. The race became one of the nastiest and most talked about races in the country, with Hunt winning a third term easily over Gardner and Libertarian nominee Scott McLaughlin.

== North Dakota ==
1992 North Dakota gubernatorial election
- November 3, 1992
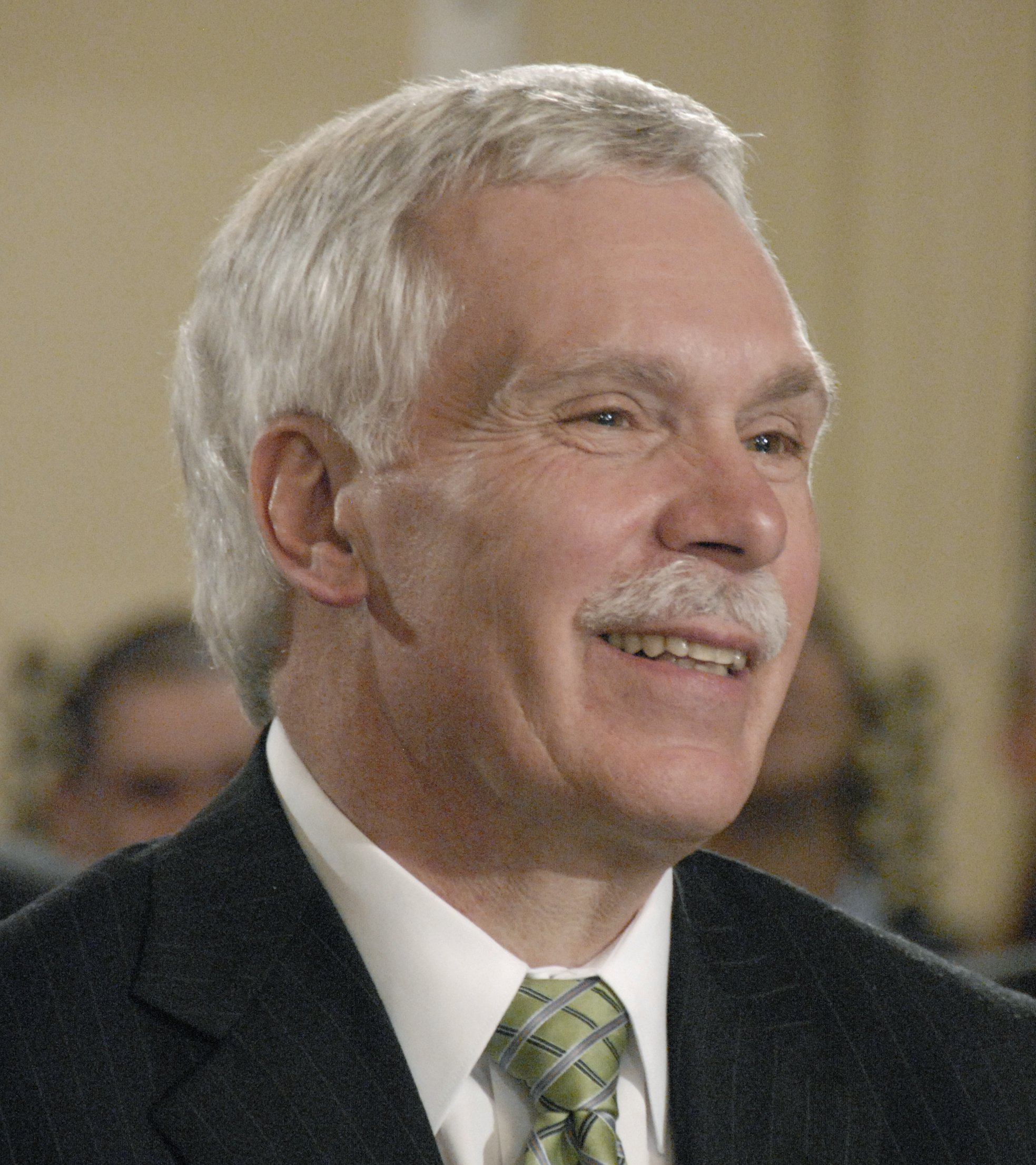

Nominee	Ed Schafer	Nicholas Spaeth
Party	Republican	Democratic–NPL
Running mate	Rosemarie Myrdal	Julie Hill
Popular vote	176,398	123,845
Percentage	58.0%	40.6%
- County results Schafer: 40-50% 50-60% 60-70% Spaeth: 40–50% 50–60% 60–70%
Governor before election
George A. Sinner
Democratic–NPL
Elected Governor
Ed Schafer
Republican

The 1992 North Dakota gubernatorial election took place on 3 November 1992. Incumbent Democratic-NPL Governor George A. Sinner retired. Republican nominee Ed Schafer defeated Democratic former Attorney General of North Dakota Nicholas Spaeth in a landslide. This was the only gubernatorial seat which the Republicans gained during this election cycle.

== Rhode Island ==
1992 Rhode Island gubernatorial election
- November 3, 1992
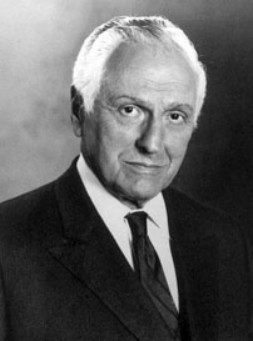

Nominee	Bruce Sundlun	Elizabeth A. Leonard
Party	Democratic	Republican
Popular vote	261,484	145,590
Percentage	61.6%	34.3%
- Sundlun: 50–60% 60–70%
Governor before election
Bruce Sundlun
Democratic
Elected Governor
Bruce Sundlun
Democratic

The 1992 Rhode Island gubernatorial election was held on November 3, 1992. Incumbent Democrat Bruce Sundlun defeated Republican nominee Elizabeth A. Leonard with 61.55% of the vote.

A Democrat would not be elected Governor of Rhode Island again until Gina Raimondo did so in 2014.

== Utah ==
1992 Utah gubernatorial election
- November 3, 1992
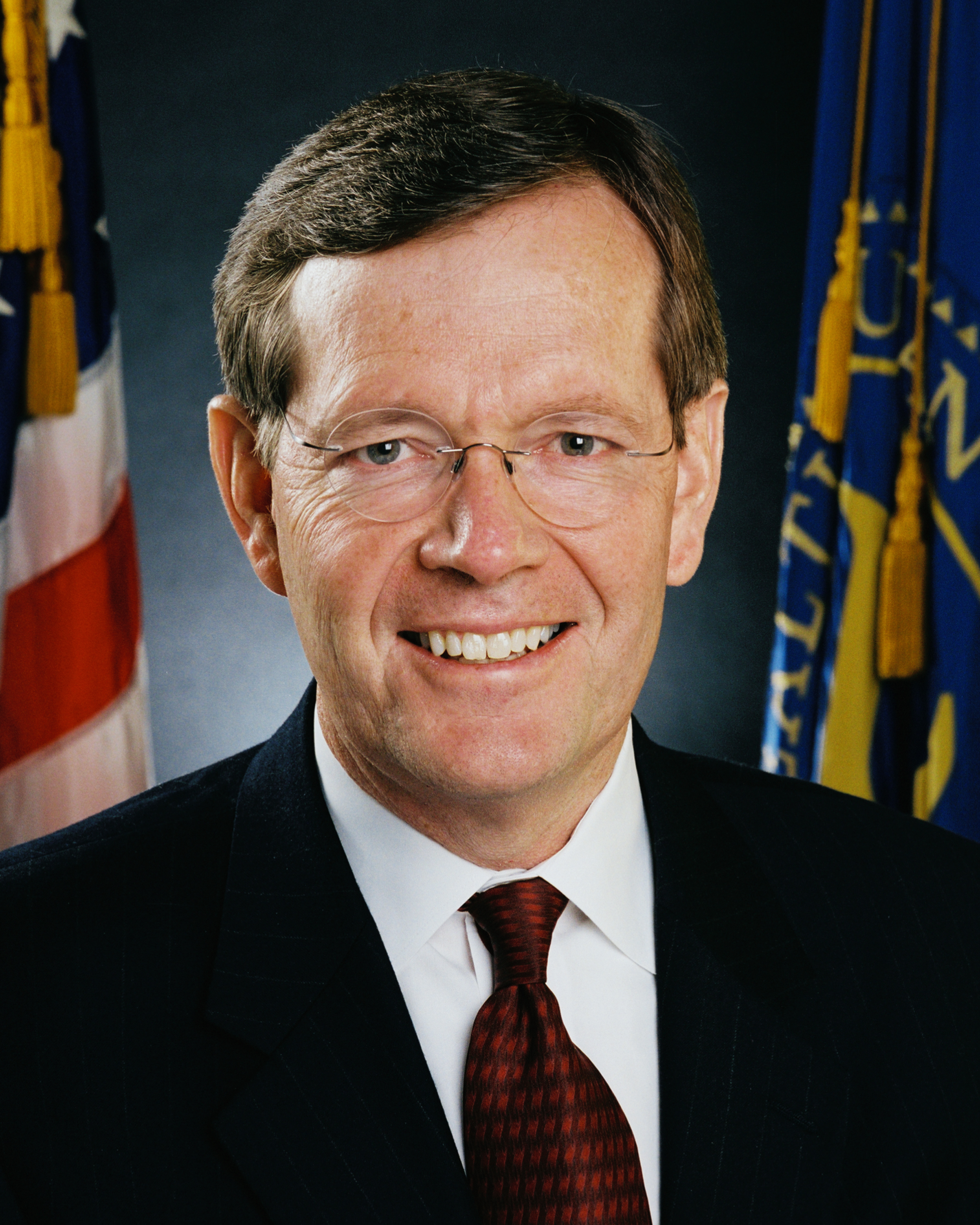

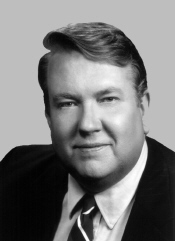

Nominee	Mike Leavitt	Merrill Cook	Stewart Hanson
Party	Republican	Independent	Democratic
Running mate	Olene Walker	Frances H. Merrill	Paula Julander
Popular vote	321,713	255,753	177,181
Percentage	42.2%	33.6%	23.3%
- County results Leavitt: 30–40% 40–50% 50–60% 60–70% Cook: 30-40% Hanson: 30–40% 40–50%
Governor before election
Norman Bangerter
Republican
Elected Governor
Mike Leavitt
Republican

The 1992 Utah gubernatorial election took place on November 3, 1992. Republican nominee Michael Leavitt won the three-way election.

== Vermont ==
1992 Vermont gubernatorial election
- November 3, 1992
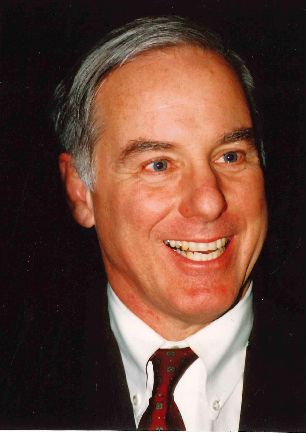

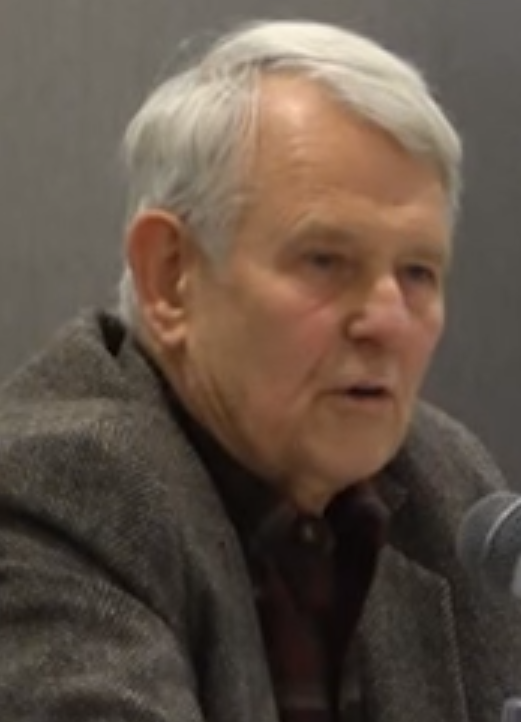
Nominee	Howard Dean	John McClaughry
Party	Democratic	Republican
Popular vote	213,523	65,837
Percentage	74.7%	23.0%
- Dean: 40-50% 50-60% 60-70% 70-80% 80-90% McClaughry: 40-50% 50-60% 60-70% 70-80%
Governor before election
Howard Dean
Democratic
Elected Governor
Howard Dean
Democratic

The 1992 Vermont gubernatorial election took place on November 3, 1992. After Republican Governor Richard Snelling died in office on August 13, 1991, Lieutenant Governor Howard Dean, a Democrat, took over for the remainder of his term. Incumbent Democrat Howard Dean ran successfully for election to a full term as Governor of Vermont, defeating Republican candidate John McClaughry. This is the best Democratic performance for governor in the history of the state.

== Washington ==
1992 Washington gubernatorial election
- November 3, 1992
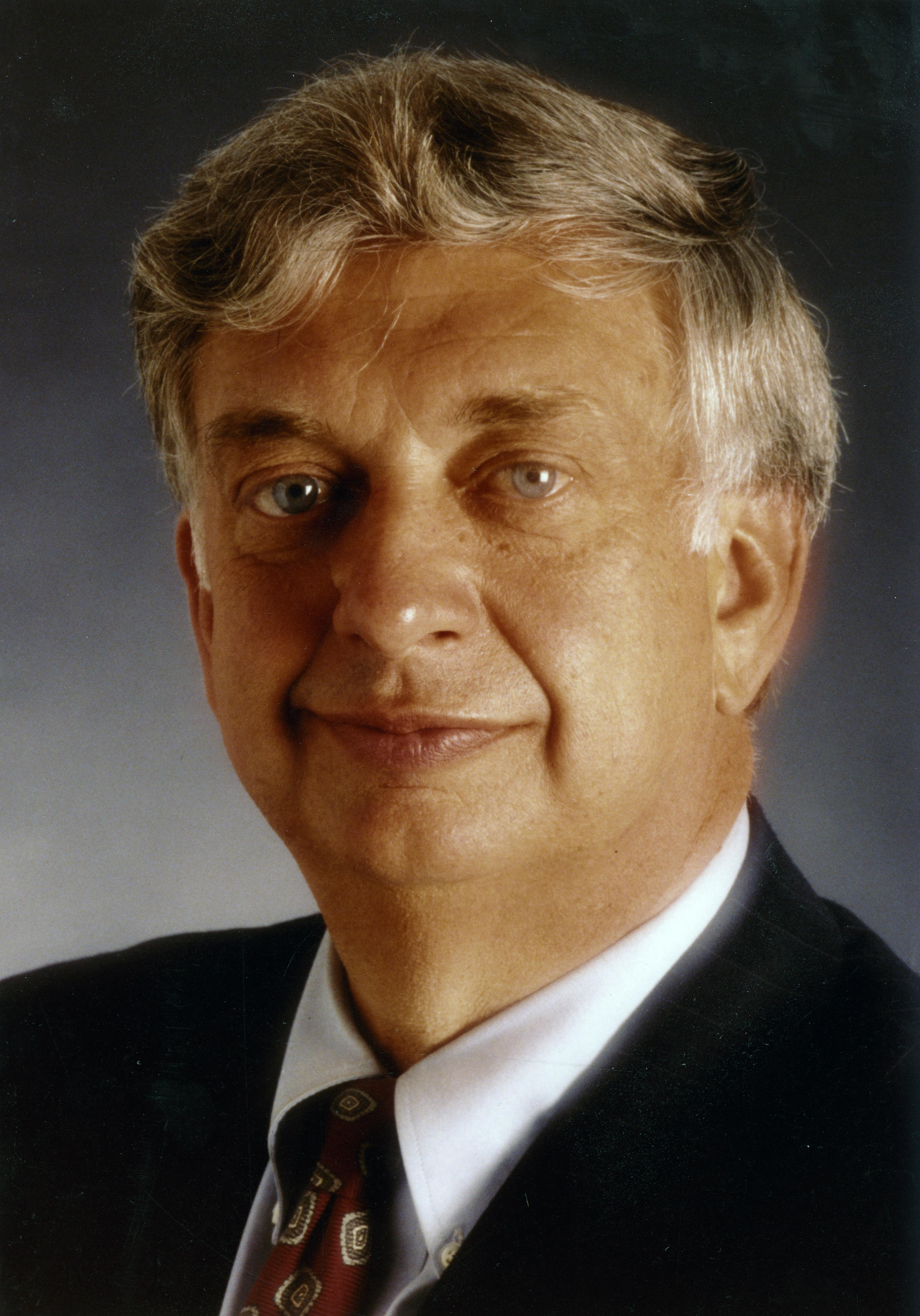

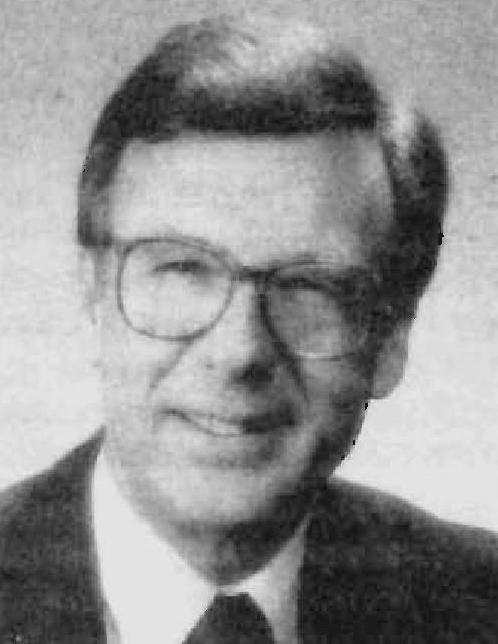
Nominee	Mike Lowry	Ken Eikenberry
Party	Democratic	Republican
Popular vote	1,184,315	1,086,216
Percentage	52.16%	47.84%
- County results Lowry: 50–60% 60–70% Eikenberry: 50–60% 60–70% 70–80%
Governor before election
Booth Gardner
Democratic
Elected Governor
Mike Lowry
Democratic

The 1992 Washington gubernatorial election was held on November 3, 1992. Incumbent Democratic Governor Booth Gardner chose not to run for a third term. This resulted in an open race for Governor of Washington in which Democrat Mike Lowry narrowly defeated Republican Ken Eikenberry. This is the last time that a gubernatorial nominee and a lieutenant gubernatorial nominee of different political parties were elected governor and lieutenant governor of Washington.

== West Virginia ==
1992 West Virginia gubernatorial election
- November 7, 1992
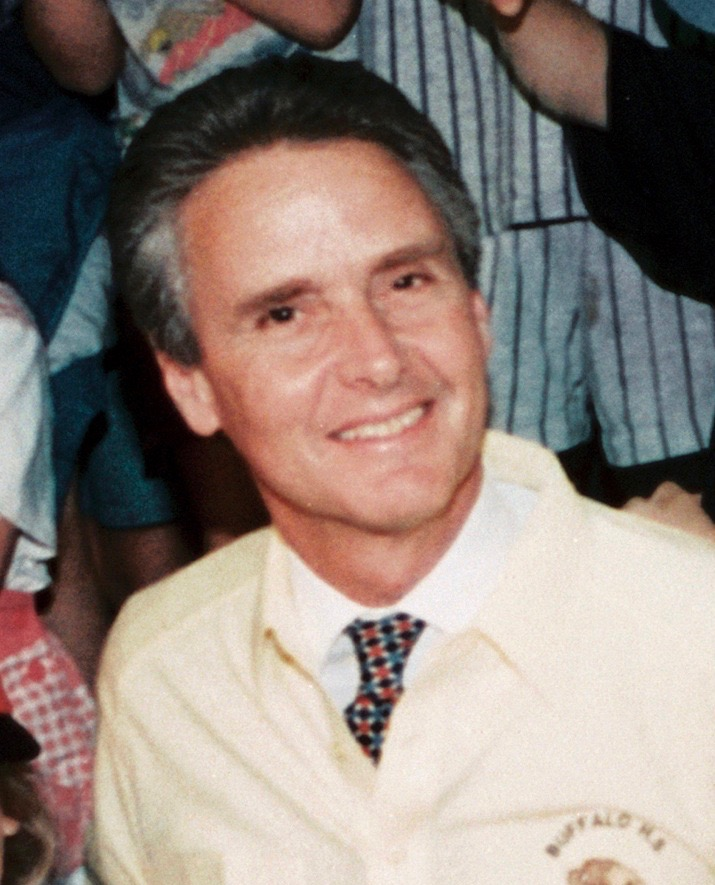

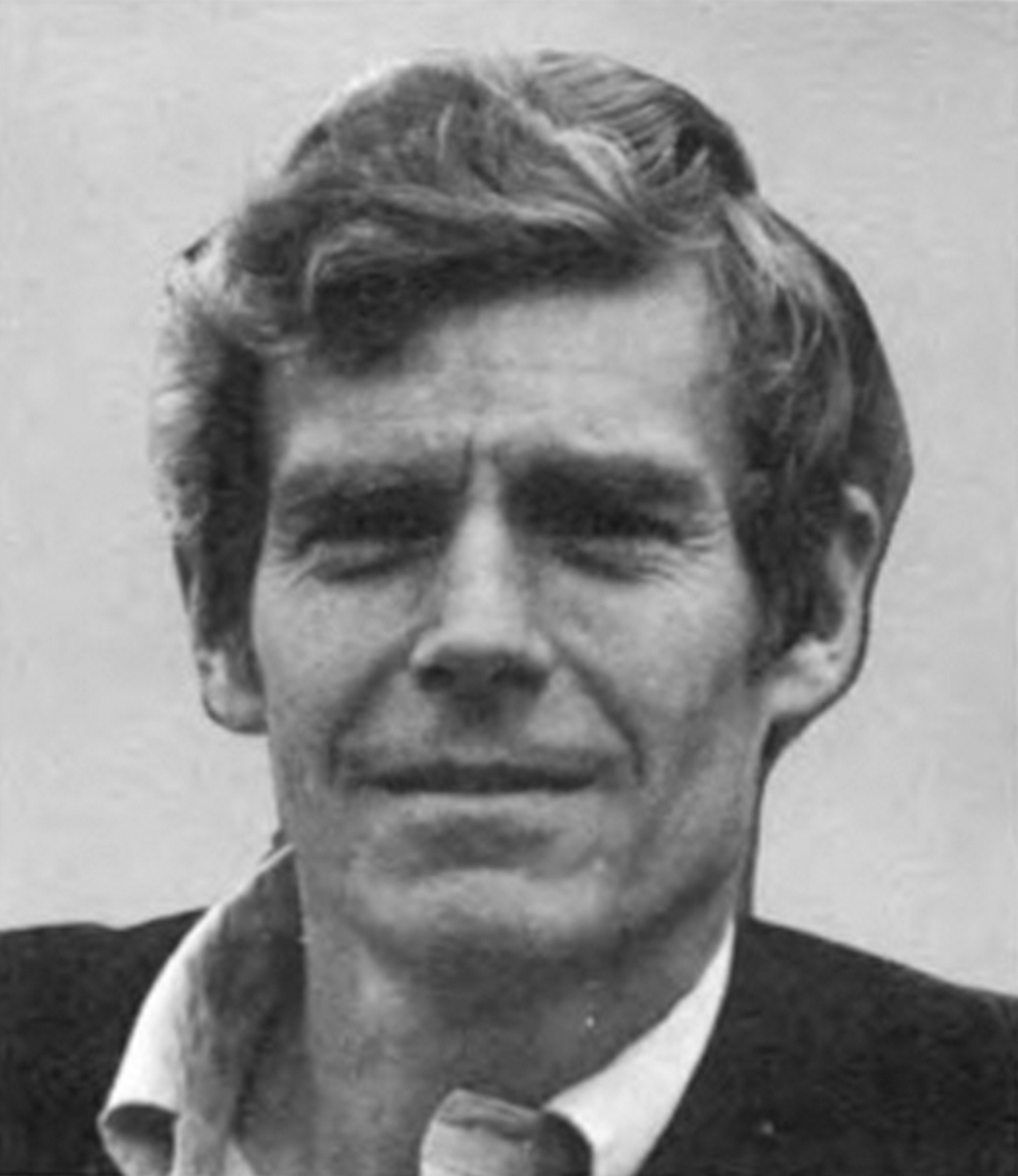

Nominee	Gaston Caperton	Cleve Benedict	Charlotte Pritt (write-in)
Party	Democratic	Republican	Independent
Popular vote	368,302	240,390	48,873
Percentage	56.0%	36.6%	7.4%
- County results Caperton: 40–50% 50–60% 60–70% 70–80% Benedict: 40–50% 50–60% 60–70%
Governor before election
Gaston Caperton
Democratic
Elected Governor
Gaston Caperton
Democratic

The 1992 West Virginia gubernatorial election took place on November 7, 1992. Incumbent Democratic governor Gaston Caperton won re-election by defeating former Republican U.S. representative Cleve Benedict and Democratic State Senator Charlotte Pritt, who ran as an independent write-in candidate after losing to Caperton in the Democratic primary election. Benedict had defeated Vernon Criss for his party's nomination; this was the only election between 1964 and 2000 that the Republicans had nominated someone other than Arch A. Moore or Cecil H. Underwood.

== Territories ==
=== American Samoa ===
Northern Marina Islands election
Party	Candidate	Votes	%
Democratic	A.P. Lutali	{{{votes}}}	53.0%
Republican	Peter Tali Coleman	{{{votes}}}	47.0%

=== Puerto Rico ===
Candidate	Party	Votes	%
Pedro Rosselló	New Progressive Party	938,969	49.90
Victoria Muñoz Mendoza	Popular Democratic Party	862,989	45.86
Fernando Martín García	Puerto Rican Independence Party	79,219	4.21
Other candidates		695	0.04
Total		1,881,872	100.00
Registered voters/turnout		2,242,381	–
Source: Nohlen

== See also ==
- 1992 United States elections
  - 1992 United States presidential election
  - 1992 United States Senate elections
  - 1992 United States House of Representatives elections
