= 2026 United States Senate election in Montana =

- November 3, 2026
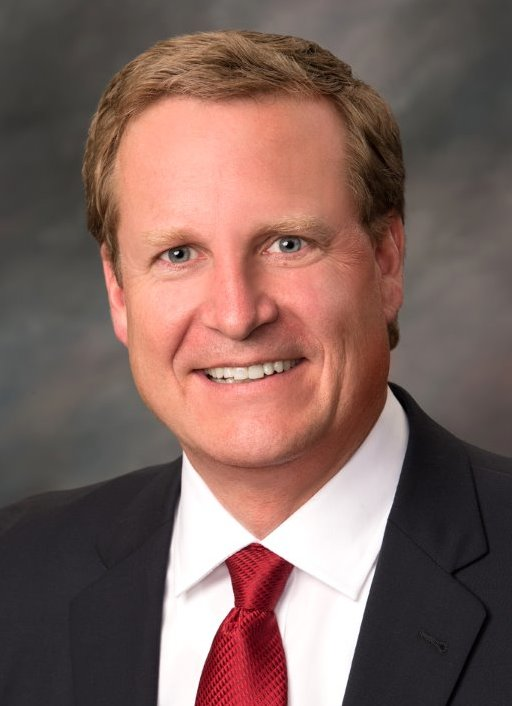

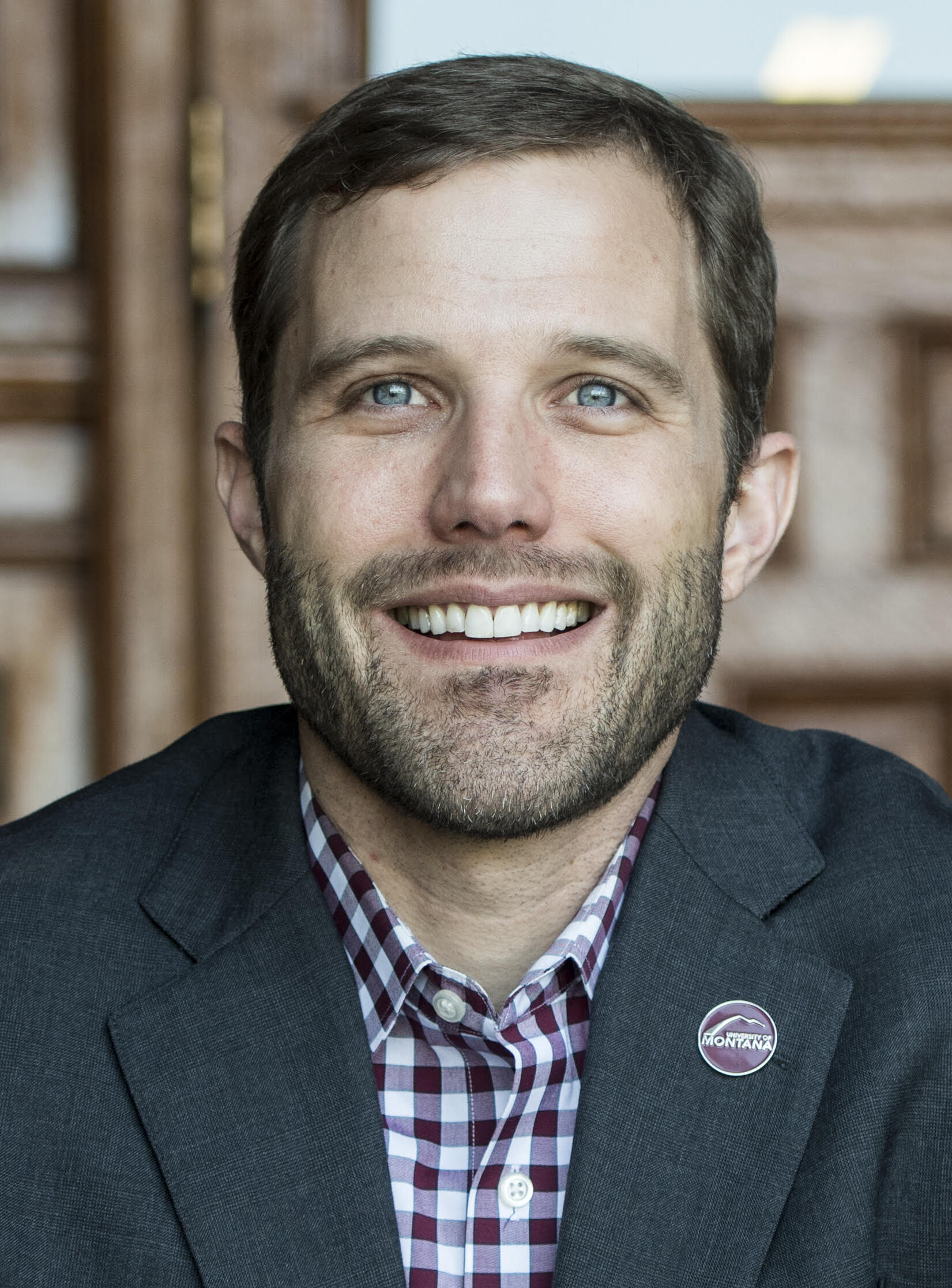

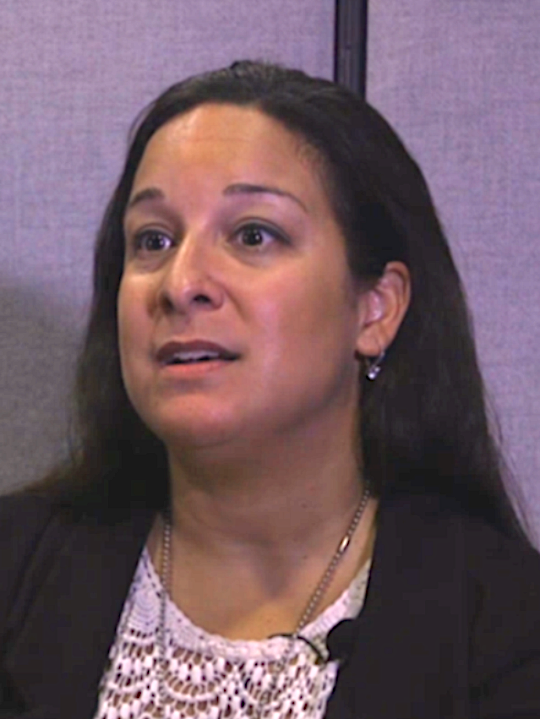
Nominee	Kurt Alme	Seth Bodnar	Alani Bankhead
Party	Republican	Independent	Democratic
Popular vote	235,693	184,574	59,984
Percentage	48.17%	37.72%	12.26%
- Alme: 30–40% 40–50% 50–60% 60–70% 70–80% 80–90% Bodnar: 40–50% 50–60%
U.S. senator before election
Steve Daines
Republican
Elected U.S. senator
Kurt Alme
Republican

The 2026 United States Senate election in Montana was held on November 3, to elect a member of the United States Senate to represent the state of Montana. Republican U.S. Attorney Kurt Alme defeated independent former University of Montana president Seth Bodnar and Democratic Air Force officer Alani Bankhead. Republican incumbent Steve Daines did not seek a third term.

In the Republican primary, Daines announced he would seek re-election, but withdrew minutes before the filing deadline and endorsed Alme, who filed to run the same day. As the only major Republican candidate, Alme was nominated with 76.2% of the vote. Bankhead won the Democratic nomination with 43.7% of the vote over former state representative Reilly Neill and tribal historic preservation officer Michael Black Wolf. Bodnar, supported by former Democratic senator Jon Tester, launched an independent campaign shortly after resigning from the University of Montana.

== Background ==
Montana is considered to be a red state at the federal level, having not voted for a Democratic president since Bill Clinton's plurality victory in 1992. Recently, the state has also been trending red on a statewide level, as Republicans flipped the governorship in 2020 and the Class I Senate seat in 2024.

== Republican primary ==
The filing deadline for participation in primaries was March 5, 2026, at 5:00 p.m. At 4:52 p.m. Kurt Alme filed to run, and 3 minutes later Steve Daines withdrew. At 5:02 p.m. Daines announced his withdrawal and endorsed Alme. The last minute switch was seen as controversial. Daines's maneuver has been criticized by members of both parties. After the announcement, the Montana Republican Party announced they would not endorse any candidates in any federal races, saying it "supports a competitive primary process to let voters pick their preferred candidates."

=== Candidates ===
==== Nominee ====
- Kurt Alme, former U.S. Attorney for the District of Montana (2017–2020, 2025–2026)

==== Eliminated in primary ====
- Lee Calhoun, mechanical engineer
- Charles WalkingChild, candidate for Montana's 2nd congressional district in 2022 and candidate for U.S. Senate in 2024

==== Withdrawn ====
- Steve Daines, incumbent U.S. senator (2015–present) (endorsed Alme)

=== Endorsements ===
Kurt Alme

Executive branch officials

- Donald Trump, president of the United States (2017–2021, 2025–present) (previously endorsed Daines)

U.S. senators

- Steve Daines, Montana (2015–present)
- Tim Sheehy, Montana (2025–present)

Statewide officials

- Greg Gianforte, governor of Montana (2021–present)

Organizations

- Americans for Prosperity
- NRA Political Victory Fund
- Republican Jewish Coalition
- Susan B. Anthony Pro-Life America
Steve Daines (withdrawn)

Executive branch officials

- ~~Donald Trump, president of the United States (2017–2021, 2025–present)~~ (endorsed Alme after Daines withdrew)

Organizations

- AIPAC
Declined to endorse

Political parties

- Montana Republican Party

=== Fundraising ===
Italics indicate a withdrawn candidate.

Campaign finance reports as of May 13, 2026
Candidate	Raised	Spent	Cash on hand
Steve Daines (R)	$8,335,510	$4,168,226	$4,275,067
Kurt Alme (R)	$1,184,127	$261,875	$922,256
Source: Federal Election Commission

=== Polling ===
Poll source	Date(s) administered	Sample size (Note: Key: A – all adults RV – registered voters LV – likely voters V – unclear)	Margin of error	Kurt Alme	Lee Calhoun	Charles WalkingChild	Undecided
Rutgers-Eagleton (Note: Poll sponsored by the Montana Free Press)	April 29 – May 7, 2026	— (RV)	—	73%	12%	15%	—

=== Results ===

Alme

50–60%
60–70%
70–80%
80–90%

Alme

40–50%
50–60%
60–70%
70–80%
80–90%
90–100%

Walking Child

40–50%
50–60%
60–70%
90–100%

Other

30–40% Tie
40–50% Tie
50% Tie
No Votes

Republican primary results
Party	Candidate	Votes	%
Republican	Kurt Alme	128,716	76.1
Republican	Lee Calhoun	23,872	14.1
Republican	Charles WalkingChild	16,474	9.7
Total votes		169,062	100.0

== Democratic primary ==
Five candidates stood in the Democratic primary. By the end of March, the Democratic field had collectively raised $123,629.43, the vast majority of which was by Reilly Neill, a former state legislator. Neill launched her campaign for Senate immediately following Jon Tester's loss to Tim Sheehy in 2024, and had run a write-in campaign in 2024 for the second district to the U.S. house, after John Driscoll, the Democratic candidate, refused to spend more than $5,000 on his campaign. A poll conducted in late April and early May for the Montana Free Press by Eagleton suggested that the Democratic candidates for Senate were largely unknown by Montanans.

Alani Bankhead, an Air Force veteran based in Helena, had raised just over $10,000 by the end of March, leaving her at a heavy financial disadvantage. However, in May, the Progressive Vet PAC (political action committee) spent $592,000 on mailers in support of Bankhead. Meanwhile, the More Jobs, Less Government PAC invested in ads attacking Neill as a liberal, and saying that Bankhead would work with Donald Trump. The Progressive Vet PAC, founded in April 2026, had former Democratic state representative Moffie Funk as its treasurer, while the More Jobs, Less Government PAC worked to promote the election of Sheehy, a Republican, in 2024. Financial filings by the More Jobs, Less Government PAC declared that their ads were in support of Bankhead, although the Progressive Vet PAC has said that the attack ads are designed to elevate Neill over Bankhead.

Brian Miller, a candidate for the U.S. House in the second district, suggested that Progressive Vet's spending was designed to benefit independent candidate Seth Bodnar, in the hopes Bankhead would win the primary and drop out in support of Bodnar. Neill publicly stated she would not drop out of the general election, and when asked by the Montana Free Press if she would drop out, Bankhead said "not only no, but hell no".

Both Neill and Bankhead campaigned in rural areas of Montana. Neill supported expansion of the Family Medical Leave Act, new educational grants, and rural healthcare, while Bankhead advocated for cuts to red tape, greater accountability in government, and protecting children and the elderly.

The Associated Press called the primary for Bankhead at 9:53pm on election night. Preliminary figures showed Bankhead with 44% of the vote to Neill's 33%. Michael Black Wolf, a tribal historic preservation officer from the Fort Belknap Indian Community, placed third with 13%. Speaking to KTVH about the results of the primary, Jeremy Johnson, a professor from Carroll College who chairs their Department of Political Science and International Relations, said that Republicans were likely to prefer running against both a Democrat and independent, and "if that could be consolidated down to one candidate, it'd be interesting to see what that could look like in November".

=== Candidates ===
==== Nominee ====
- Alani Bankhead, Air Force lieutenant colonel and leadership coach

==== Eliminated in primary ====
- Michael Black Wolf, tribal historic preservation officer at Fort Belknap Indian Community
- Michael Hummert, retired remodeling contractor and candidate for U.S. Senate in 2024
- Christopher Kehoe, arts administrator
- Reilly Neill, former state representative from the 62nd district (2013–2015)

==== Withdrawn ====
- Kathleen McLaughlin, homemaker (running for Montana House of Representatives)

==== Declined ====
- Jon Tester, former U.S. senator (2007–2025)

=== Endorsements ===
Reilly Neill

Statewide officials

- Brian Schweitzer, former governor of Montana (2005–2013)

=== Fundraising ===
Campaign finance reports as of May 13, 2026
Candidate	Raised	Spent	Cash on hand
Alani Bankhead (D)	$23,884	$11,307	$13,737
Michael Black Wolf (D)	$26,144	$25,616	$528
Michael Hummert (D)	$12,230	$3,192	$9,783
Reilly Neill (D)	$293,990	$220,637	$73,353
Source: Federal Election Commission

=== Results ===

Bankhead

30–40%
40–50%
50–60%

Neill

20–30%
30–40%
40–50%

Black Wolf

30–40%
40–50%
50–60%

Other

30–40% Tie

Bankhead

20–30%
30–40%
40–50%
50–60%
60–70%
70–80%
80–90%
90–100%

Neill

20–30%
30–40%
40–50%
50–60%
60–70%
70–80%
80–90%
90–100%

Black Wolf

30–40%
40–50%
50–60%
60–70%
70–80%
80–90%
90–100%

Kehoe

30–40%

Hummert

40–50%
50–60%
90–100%

Other

20–30% Tie
30–40% Tie
40–50% Tie
50% Tie
No Votes

Democratic primary results
Party	Candidate	Votes	%
Democratic	Alani Bankhead	48,772	43.6
Democratic	Reilly Neill	36,880	33.0
Democratic	Michael Black Wolf	14,678	13.1
Democratic	Christopher Kehoe	7,108	6.4
Democratic	Michael Hummert	4,305	3.9
Total votes		111,743	100.0

== Libertarian primary ==
The Libertarian primary was contested by two candidates — Clancy resident Tom Jandron, and Billings pharmacist Kyle Austin, twice a candidate in the Republican U.S. House primary for the 2nd district. Jandron was unanimously endorsed by Libertarian delegates for Senate at the party's April convention, with the party stating that he was more ideologically aligned to libertarian ideals than Austin.

Austin opposed increasing the size of the federal government and the national debt. He expressed concern about changes by Congress in 2025 to limit access to Medicaid, but supported work requirements for benefits. Jandron supported the Defend the Guard proposal, said that Republicans in Montana had not done enough to counter rising spending or government surveillance, and described himself as an ideological libertarian, having been a member of the party for five years.

Austin won the primary, but was disavowed by the Montana Libertarian Party.

=== Candidates ===
==== Nominee ====
- Kyle Austin, pharmacist and Republican candidate for Montana's 2nd congressional district in 2022 and 2024

==== Eliminated in primary ====
- Tom Jandron, aviation professional

=== Endorsements ===
Tom Jandron

Political parties

- Montana Libertarian Party

=== Fundraising ===
Campaign finance reports as of May 20, 2026
Candidate	Raised	Spent	Cash on hand
Kyle Austin (L)	$262,095	$233,572	$28,523
Source: Federal Election Commission

=== Results ===

Austin

50–60%
60–70%
70–80%
90–100%

Jandron

50–60%
60–70%
70–80%
80–90%
90–100%

Other

50% Tie

Austin

50–60%
60–70%
70–80%
80–90%
90–100%

Jandron

50–60%
60–70%
70–80%
80–90%
90–100%

Other

50% Tie
No Votes

Libertarian primary results
Party	Candidate	Votes	%
Libertarian	Kyle Austin	1,819	53.3
Libertarian	Tom Jandron	1,592	46.7
Total votes		3,411	100.0

== Independent ==
=== Candidate ===
Former University of Montana president Seth Bodnar announced his candidacy as an independent on March 4, 2026, two months after he resigned from the university. He entered the race with the backing of former Democratic senator Jon Tester. Bodnar submitted 29,964 signatures from 52 of Montana's 56 counties to qualify for the ballot. Of those, 21,284 were accepted, exceeding the required 13,327 signatures. Paid signature gatherers who worked on behalf of the Bodnar campaign were under investigation by the Cascade County Sheriff's Office. According to the Cascade County Sheriff's Department, the Bodnar campaign was fully cooperating with the investigation and was not itself accused of wrongdoing.

==== Declared ====
- Seth Bodnar, former president of the University of Montana (2018–2026)

=== Fundraising ===
Campaign finance reports as of May 13, 2026
Candidate	Raised	Spent	Cash on hand
Seth Bodnar (I)	$2,113,231	$1,149,310	$963,921
Source: Federal Election Commission

== General election ==
=== Campaign ===
At a June 15 press conference, her first after winning the June 2 primary, Bankhead stated she would remain in the race and called upon Bodnar to drop out, citing a gender discrimination lawsuit filed against the University of Montana (UM) in 2021. A spokesperson for the Bodnar campaign said that he had taken claims of discrimination seriously while being president of UM, and that no wrongdoing had been found as a result of the lawsuit.

As polls showed Alme likely to win a three-way race, many Democratic leaders called on their nominee, Bankhead, to drop out of the race, believing Bodnar was their best hope to beat Alme.

Since mid-July, Montana Freedom PAC, a political action committee supporting Bodnar, has paid for signs and digital advertising suggesting Bankhead should leave the race. As of early August the committee had spent more than $1 million on advertising benefiting Bodnar.

On the deadline for candidate withdrawal, August 10, HuffPost reported that Bankhead was choosing to stay in the race, keeping it a three-way contest.

On October 12, Shannon O'Brien, the Chair of the Montana Democratic Party, resigned from her position in order to endorse Bodnar's campaign.

=== Predictions ===
Source	Ranking	As of
The Cook Political Report	Solid R	November 2, 2026
Decision Desk HQ	Likely R	November 3, 2026
The Economist (Note: The Economist's prediction model uses unconventional terminology. For the purpose of equivalency, their "Very Likely" ratings are formatted as a "Likely" rating while "Likely" ratings are formatted as a "Lean" rating.)	Likely R	November 3, 2026
FiftyPlusOne	Likely R	November 3, 2026
Fox News	Solid R	November 1, 2026
Inside Elections	Solid R	October 29, 2026
MS NOW	Safe R	October 29, 2026
NBC News	Likely R	November 3, 2026
RealClearPolitics	Likely R	November 2, 2026
Sabato's Crystal Ball	Safe R	November 2, 2026
Silver Bulletin	Likely R	November 3, 2026
Split Ticket	Safe R	November 2, 2026

=== Endorsements ===
Kurt Alme (R)

Organizations

- Club for Growth PAC
- Montana Stockgrowers Association
- U.S. Chamber of Commerce
Alani Bankhead (D)

Statewide officials

- Brian Schweitzer, former governor of Montana (2005–2013)

Organizations

- National Organization for Women
- National Women's Political Caucus
Seth Bodnar (I)

Executive branch officials

- Pete Buttigieg, former secretary of transportation (2021–2025) (Democratic)

U.S. senators

- Max Baucus, former Montana (1978–2014) (Democratic)
- Joe Manchin, former West Virginia (2010–2025) (Independent; Democratic until 2024)
- Jon Tester, former Montana (2007–2025) (Democratic)

U.S. representatives

- Adam Kinzinger, former IL-16 (2011–2023) (Republican)

Statewide officials

- Bob Brown, former Secretary of State of Montana (2001–2005) (Republican)
- Steve Bullock, former governor of Montana (2013–2021) (Democratic)
- Denise Juneau, former Superintendent of Public Instruction of Montana (2009–2017) (Democratic)
- Nancy Keenan, former superintendent of public instruction of Montana (1989–2001) (Democratic)
- Monica Lindeen, former Montana State Auditor (2009–2017) (Democratic)
- Marc Racicot, former governor of Montana (1993–2001) (Republican)
- Arnold Schwarzenegger, actor and former governor of California (2003–2011) (Republican)

State legislators

- Bryce Bennett, former state senator from the 50th district (2019–2021) (Democratic)
- Dorothy Bradley, former state representative from the 79th district (1971–1979, 1985–1993) (Democratic)
- Carol Juneau, former state senator from the 8th district (2007–2011) (Democratic)

Party officials

- Robyn Driscoll, former chair of the Montana Democratic Party (2019–2025) (Democratic)
- Susan Good Geise, former Lewis and Clark County commissioner and former chair of the Montana Republican Party (1992–1993) (Republican)
- Shannon O'Brien, former Chair of the Montana Democratic Party (2025–2026) (Democratic)
- Andrew Yang, co-chair of the Forward Party (2022–present) and former 2020 Democratic presidential candidate (Forward)

Individuals

- Reid Hoffman, co-founder of LinkedIn
- Michael Novogratz, co-founder and CEO of Galaxy Digital LP
- Stephanie Schriock, former president of EMILYs List (2010–2021)

Labor unions

- Montana AFL-CIO
- Montana Federation of Public Employees
- National Education Association
- SEIU 775 Montana
- Teamsters Local 2

Organizations

- American Association for Justice PAC
- End Citizens United
- Forward Montana
- Independent Leadership Council
- League of Conservation Voters Action Fund
- Montana Conservation Voters
- Montanans for Public Lands
- Reproductive Freedom for All
- Planned Parenthood
- VoteVets

Political parties

- Forward Party
- Reform Party
Declined to endorse

Political parties

- Montana Libertarian Party

=== Fundraising ===
Campaign finance reports as of October 14, 2026
Candidate	Raised	Spent	Cash on hand
Kurt Alme (R)	$3,013,681	$2,410,943	$602,738
Alani Bankhead (D)	$190,540	$167,720	$22,820
Kyle Austin (L)	$261,825	$259,691	$2,684
Seth Bodnar (I)	$4,918,341	$4,337,420	$580,921
Source: Federal Election Commission

=== Polling ===
Aggregate polls

Source of poll aggregation	Dates administered	Dates updated	Kurt Alme (R)	Alani Bankhead (D)	Seth Bodnar (I)	Other/ Undecided (Note: Calculated by taking the difference of 100% and all other candidates combined.)	Margin
270toWin	September 19 – October 18, 2026	October 20, 2026	45.5%	20.0%	27.5%	7.0%	Alme +18.0%
Decision Desk HQ	through October 23, 2026	October 30, 2026	37.5%	16.1%	31.3%	15.1%	Alme +6.2%
FiftyPlusOne	through October 23, 2026	November 3, 2026	40.1%	15.7%	32.1%	12.1%	Alme +8.0%
Silver Bulletin	through October 23, 2026	November 3, 2026	41.3%	17.1%	32.6%	9.0%	Alme +8.7%
Average			41.1%	17.2%	30.9%	10.8%	Alme +10.2%

Poll source	Date(s) administered	Sample size	Margin of error	Kurt Alme (R)	Alani Bankhead (D)	Seth Bodnar (I)	Kyle Austin (L)	Other	Undecided
Concord Public Opinion Partners (D) (Note: Poll sponsored by Education Reform Now Advocacy, a nonprofit associated with Democrats for Education Reform.)	October 22–23, 2026	410 (LV)	± 4.8%	38%	10%	39%	2%	—	11%
Montana State University Billings	October 5–21, 2026	720 (A)	± 3.7%	30%	21%	26%	3%	1% (Note: Jami Woodman (I) with 1%)	17%
Quantus Insights (R)	October 15–18, 2026	667 (LV)	± 4.0%	46% (Note: With voters who lean towards a given candidate)	21%	29%	2%	0% (Note: "Someone else" with 0%)	2%
Quantus Insights (R)	October 15–18, 2026	667 (LV)	± 4.0%	44%	21%	28%	2%	0%	5%
Quantus Insights (R)	October 15–18, 2026	667 (LV)	± 4.0%	47%	22%	31%	—	—	—
Peak Insights (R) (Note: Poll sponsored by Alme's campaign)	October 7–12, 2026	500 (LV)	± 4.0%	44%	12%	29%	3%	—	12%
Concord Public Opinion Partners (D)	October 6–8, 2026	405 (LV)	± 4.9%	35%	13%	37%	1%	—	13%
American Pulse Research (Note: Poll sponsored by KULR-TV)	September 19–24, 2026	604 (LV)	—	45%	19%	26%	3%	—	7%
Quantus Insights (R)	September 14–15, 2026	625 (LV)	± 4.3%	44%	23%	24%	—	2% (Note: "Someone else" with 2%)	7%
Aspect Strategic (Note: Poll sponsored by Montana Freedom PAC, which supports Bodnar)	September 7–15, 2026	715 (LV)	—	44%	14%	32%	3%	—	7%
Rutgers-Eagleton (Note: Poll sponsored by the Montana Free Press)	August 27 – September 7, 2026	845 (RV)	± 4.2%	38%	16%	30%	5%	11% (Note: "Someone else" with 6%; "Would not vote" with 5%)	—
Peak Insights (R)	August 23–25, 2026	600 (LV)	± 4.0%	44%	19%	22%	2%	—	13%
Hart Research (D) (Note: Poll sponsored by Forward Montana, which supports Bodnar)	August 1–4, 2026	800 (LV)	—	45%	15%	30%	6%	—	4%
Hart Research (D)	August 1–4, 2026	800 (LV)	—	46%	—	46%	—	—	8%
Hart Research (D)	August 1–4, 2026	800 (LV)	—	52%	38%	—	—	—	10%
Tavern Research (D)	July 23–27, 2026	517 (LV)	± 5.0%	49%	24%	25%	2%	—	—
Tavern Research (D)	July 23–27, 2026	517 (LV)	± 5.0%	49%	24%	27%	—	—	—
GQR (D) (Note: Poll commissioned by Contours Inc.)	July 23–26, 2026	500 (LV)	± 4.4%	41%	22%	27%	6%	—	4%
Bullfinch Group (R)	July 13–16, 2026	793 (LV)	± 3.48%	36%	22%	24%	—	—	18%
GrayHouse (R)	June 23–24, 2026	500 (RV)	± 4.4%	41%	25%	17%	3%	—	13%
Hart Research (D) (Note: Poll commissioned by The Majority Institute, a research firm that supports Democrats)	June 18–24, 2026	800 (LV)	—	47%	22%	25%	—	—	6%
Tavern Research (D)	June 16–19, 2026	400 (LV)	± 6.1%	49%	26%	24%	2%	—	—
Public Opinion Strategies (R) (Note: Poll commissioned by The Political Company, a consulting firm that supports Republicans)	June 8–11, 2026	500 (LV)	± 4.4%	44%	25%	20%	4%	—	7%

Hypothetical polling

Kurt Alme vs. Alani Bankhead vs. Kyle Austin

Poll source	Date(s) administered	Sample size	Margin of error	Kurt Alme (R)	Alani Bankhead (D)	Kyle Austin (L)	Undecided
Tavern Research (D)	July 23–27, 2026	517 (LV)	± 5.0%	59%	41%	—	—
Tavern Research (D)	July 23–27, 2026	517 (LV)	± 5.0%	56%	36%	8%	—
GQR (D)	July 23–26, 2026	500 (LV)	± 4.4%	44%	40%	13%	4%
GQR (D)	July 23–26, 2026	500 (LV)	± 4.4%	52%	44%	—	4%
Hart Research (D)	June 18–24, 2026	800 (LV)	—	49%	43%	—	8%
Tavern Research (D)	June 16–19, 2026	400 (LV)	± 6.1%	56%	44%	—	—

Kurt Alme vs. Seth Bodnar vs. Kyle Austin

Poll source	Date(s) administered	Sample size	Margin of error	Kurt Alme (R)	Seth Bodnar (I)	Kyle Austin (L)	Other	Undecided
Tavern Research (D)	July 23–27, 2026	517 (LV)	± 5.0%	50%	45%	5%	—	—
Tavern Research (D)	July 23–27, 2026	517 (LV)	± 5.0%	51%	49%	—	—	—
GQR (D)	July 23–26, 2026	500 (LV)	± 4.4%	40%	44%	11%	—	5%
GQR (D)	July 23–26, 2026	500 (LV)	± 4.4%	44%	50%	—	—	6%
Hart Research (D)	June 18–24, 2026	800 (LV)	—	47%	45%	—	—	8%
Tavern Research (D)	June 16–19, 2026	400 (LV)	± 6.1%	50%	50%	—	—	—
Tavern Research (D)	May 13–18, 2026	607 (LV)	± 5.1%	50%	50%	—	—	—
Change Research (D) (Note: Poll sponsored by Independent Candidate Action, which supports Bodnar)	March 17–20, 2026	616 (LV)	± 4.2%	37%	35%	—	2% (Note: "Would not vote" with 2%)	26%

Kurt Alme vs. Reilly Neill vs. Seth Bodnar

Poll source	Date(s) administered	Sample size	Margin of error	Kurt Alme (R)	Reilly Neill (D)	Seth Bodnar (I)	Other	Undecided
Tavern Research (D)	May 13–18, 2026	607 (LV)	± 5.1%	46%	24%	26%	3% (Note: Tom Jandron (L) with 3%)	—
Tavern Research (D)	May 13–18, 2026	607 (LV)	± 5.1%	58%	42%	—	—	—

Steve Daines vs. Reilly Neill vs. Seth Bodnar

Poll source	Date(s) administered	Sample size	Margin of error	Steve Daines (R)	Reilly Neill (D)	Seth Bodnar (I)	Other	Undecided
American Pulse Research & Polling	February 14–18, 2026	607 (LV)	± 4.0%	52%	25%	16%	-	7%
American Pulse Research & Polling	February 14–18, 2026	607 (LV)	± 4.0%	56%	37%	—	-	7%
American Pulse Research & Polling	February 14–18, 2026	607 (LV)	± 4.0%	51%	—	42%	-	7%
yes. every kid.	January 23–26, 2026	500 (RV)	± 4.4%	43%	19%	15%	3% (Note: "Someone else/Other" with 2%; "Do not plan to vote" with 1%)	20%

Steve Daines vs. Seth Bodnar as a Democrat

Poll source	Date(s) administered	Sample size	Margin of error	Steve Daines (R)	Seth Bodnar (D)	Undecided
American Pulse Research & Polling	February 14–18, 2026	607 (LV)	± 4.0%	54%	40%	6%

Kurt Alme vs. generic Democrat

Poll source	Date(s) administered	Sample size	Margin of error	Kurt Alme (R)	Generic Democrat	Undecided
Tavern Research (D)	June 16–19, 2026	400 (LV)	± 6.1%	56%	44%	—
Tavern Research (D)	May 13–18, 2026	607 (LV)	± 5.1%	56%	44%	—

=== Results ===
2026 United States Senate election in Montana
Party	Candidate	Votes	%	±%
Republican	Kurt Alme	235,693	48.17%	–6.84%
Independent	Seth Bodnar	184,574	37.72%	N/A
Democratic	Alani Bankhead	59,984	12.26%	–32.73%
Libertarian	Kyle Austin	9,018	1.84%	N/A
Total votes		489,269		
Republican hold				

Counties that flipped from Democratic to Republican

- Big Horn (largest city: Hardin)
- Blaine (largest city: Fort Belknap Agency)
- Roosevelt (largest city: Wolf Point)

Counties that flipped from Democratic to Independent

- Deer Lodge (largest city: Anaconda)
- Gallatin (largest city: Bozeman)
- Glacier (largest city: Cut Bank)
- Lewis and Clark (largest city: Helena)
- Missoula (largest city: Missoula)
- Silver Bow (largest city: Butte)

County that flipped from Republican to Independent

- Park (largest city: Livingston)

== See also ==
- 2026 Montana elections

== Notes ==
Partisan clients
