= Seth Bodnar =

American academic administrator (born 1979)

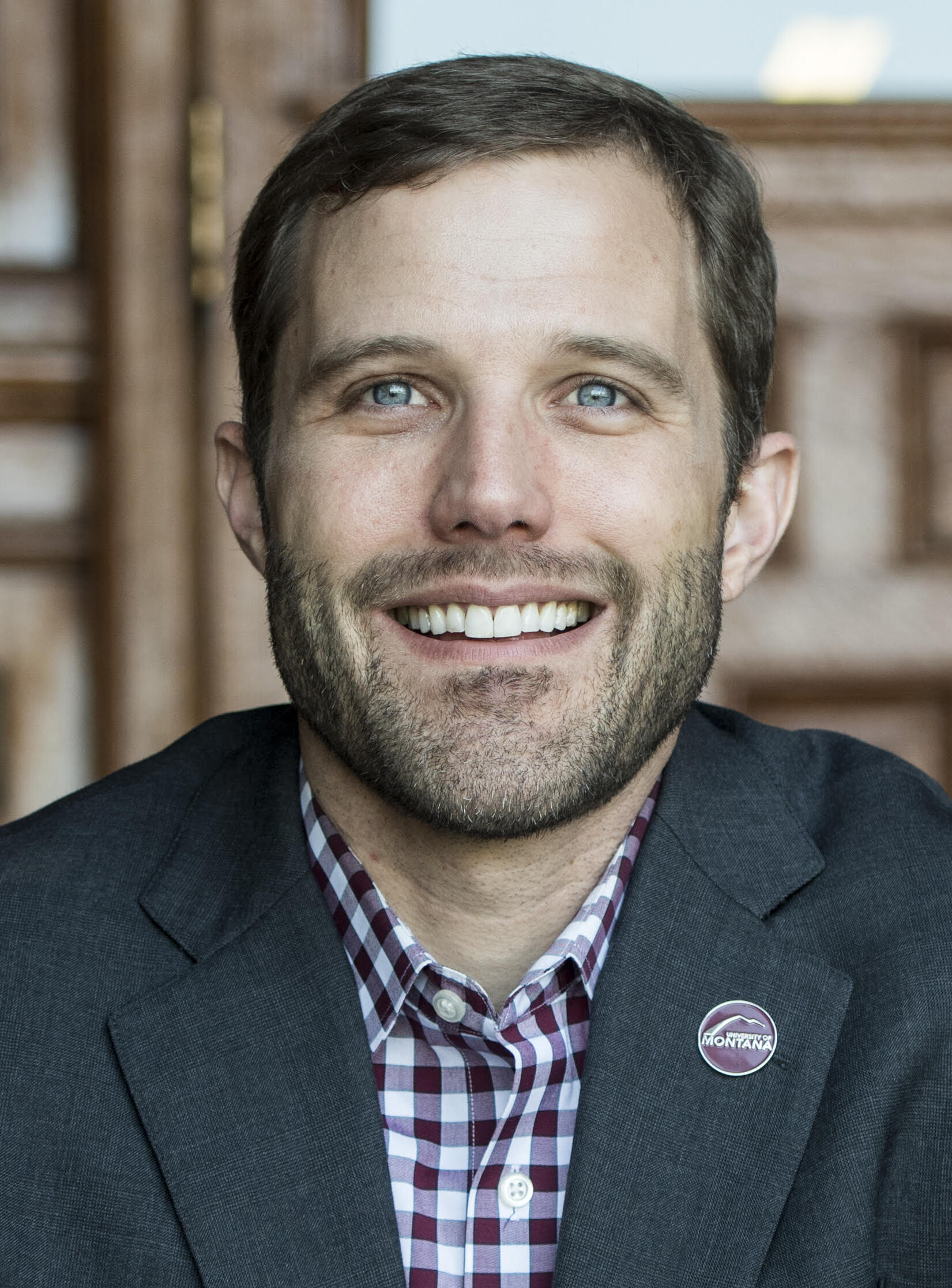
- Bodnar in 2019

President of the University of Montana
- In office January 1, 2018 – January 21, 2026
- Preceded by: Sheila Sterns
- Succeeded by: Jeremiah Shinn

Personal details
- Born: Seth Andrew Bodnar; February 2, 1979 (age 47) Franklin, Pennsylvania, U.S.
- Party: Independent (2012–present)
- Other political affiliations: Democratic (before 2012)
- Spouse: Chelsea
- Children: 3
- Education: United States Military Academy (BS); Hertford College, Oxford (MA, MSc)
- Website: Campaign website

Military service
- Branch/service: United States Army
- Years of service: 2003–2022
- Rank: Lieutenant Colonel
- Unit: 101st Airborne Division; 1st Special Forces Group; Montana Army National Guard

Seth Andrew Bodnar (born February 2, 1979) is an American academic administrator, U.S. Army veteran, and business executive who was the 19th president of the University of Montana. He is a graduate of West Point and was a Rhodes Scholar with master's degrees from Hertford College, Oxford. He remains an active military officer in the Montana National Guard. In January 2026, Bodnar resigned his post as president of the University of Montana, and two months later he officially announced his run for U.S. Senate in 2026, which he lost to Kurt Alme.

== Early life and education ==
Seth Bodnar was raised in Franklin, Pennsylvania, the son of two educators. He graduated first in his class from the United States Military Academy, earning a Bachelor of Science in Economics. Following his time at West Point, Bodnar was selected as a Rhodes Scholar and a Truman Scholar, allowing him to pursue graduate studies at Hertford College, Oxford, where he earned two master's degrees—one in Economics and Social History and another in Comparative Social Policy.

== Career ==
=== Military service ===
Bodnar served in the 101st Airborne Division and as a Green Beret in the US Army's 1st Special Forces Group. He commanded a Special Forces detachment on multiple deployments and served as Special Assistant to the Commanding General in Iraq. From 2003 to 2004, he was deployed to Iraq as an infantry officer and served in the 101st Airborne Division. Bodnar later served in the 1st Special Forces Group and commanded a detachment during additional overseas deployments. In 2008, Bodnar was deployed to Baghdad, Iraq.

Following his deployments, Bodnar returned to West Point, where he served as an assistant professor, taught economics, mentored cadets, and published research on economic development in conflict areas. As of 2022, Bodnar remained a Lieutenant Colonel in the Montana National Guard.

=== General Electric ===
In 2011, Bodnar joined General Electric (GE), eventually becoming a senior executive in GE's transportation division. As GE Transportation's chief digital officer, Bodnar oversaw the development of General Electric's "digital hub", which was responsible for developing locomotive and railway technology.

=== University of Montana ===
Bodnar assumed the role of President of the University of Montana in January 2018. He took over as the university was near the bottom of a decade-long enrollment decline; enrollment had fallen by 25% since 2010. Shortly after joining the University of Montana, Bodnar initiated cost-cutting measures targeting the Modern and Classical Arts program. Bodnar claimed "tough choices" were necessary to bring the budget in balance. However, by the 2024 academic year, the University recorded a 5.6% increase in first-year students, which was the largest year-over-year enrollment increase since 2009. The University of Montana also recruited its highest-ever number of concurrently enrolled Native American students. Student retention also improved, topping 77% and rising by 9 percentage points since 2018. The university’s research activity also grew during Bodnar’s tenure. UM nearly doubled its research award volume and achieved the Carnegie very high research (R1) classification in 2022.

In August 2021, four current and former University of Montana employees filed a federal lawsuit against the university and the Montana University System alleging sex-based discrimination in violation of Title IX; by the end of the litigation, 18 women had joined the suit. The plaintiffs’ claims of mistreatment dated back to 2013, before Bodnar became president. The lawsuit, involving 18 plaintiffs, alleged sex based discrimination and the University creating a "good ol boys club" with then President Seth Bodnar perpetuating a culture that continued to create "wage, promotion and opportunity gaps for women." The university denied the allegations throughout the case. The court dismissed the claims of two plaintiffs, and in 2024, the University of Montana settled the lawsuit for $350,000, with no admission of wrongdoing.

== 2026 U.S. Senate campaign ==
Running as an Independent candidate, Bodnar lost the 2026 Senate race general election on Nov. 3, 2026. Bodnar initially filed as an independent on March 4, 2026, hours before incumbent Republican Senator Steve Daines withdrew from the race. Three minutes before Daines' exit, former U.S. Attorney Kurt Alme entered the race as the Republican candidate, with Daines endorsing Alme. Bodnar criticized the timing in a statement, saying Daines “has so little respect for Montana Republicans that he withdrew at the last minute to coronate his handpicked successor.”

Alme, Democratic Party candidate Alani Bankhead, and Libertarian Party candidate Kyle Austin won their respective primary elections on June 2, 2026 setting up a 4-way general election contest. Alme won the general election in a plurality, earning 48 percent of the vote total, and defeating Bodnar, Bankhead, and Austin on Nov. 3, 2024, to become Montana's second US Senator.

=== Campaign Positions ===
==== Independence and political reform ====
Bodnar has campaigned against what he calls a “dysfunctional” and “corrupt” two-party system, while rejecting the label of either major party. He has pledged not to caucus with either party if elected, and has said he would work with other independent-minded senators.

Bodnar’s reform agenda calls for banning members of Congress and their family members from trading individual stocks, requiring public disclosure of financial transactions within 48 hours, banning members of Congress and senior executive officials from using prediction markets, and imposing lifetime bans on former members lobbying the agencies or committees they served on, or registering as lobbyists for foreign governments.

==== War powers and foreign policy ====
Bodnar has called the war with Iran “senseless and illegal,” and argued that Congress has surrendered its constitutional authority to check military action by presidents of either party. Citing Article I, Section 8 of the Constitution, which gives Congress the power to declare war, Bodnar has said the Senate needs to “force the commander in chief to make the case” before committing U.S. forces to conflicts. Bodnar has linked the war to rising costs in Montana, attributing diesel prices and rising fertilizer costs to the conflict. The war has been the sharpest policy difference between Bodnar and Republican nominee Kurt Alme, who considers the war necessary, short of putting U.S. troops on Iranian soil. During the October 11 Montana Broadcasters Association debate, Bodnar said Alme “would just give a blank check to continue that war with no accountability.”

==== Economy, trade, and agriculture ====
Bodnar has opposed tariffs he says are harming Montanans, and has said the United States needs to end its trade war with Canada. He supports mandatory country-of-origin labeling for beef and more aggressive enforcement of antitrust laws, arguing that monopolies in meatpacking, health care, technology, and fertilizer have driven up costs for Montana farmers. He has called the national debt a “moral failure” by both parties, and supports changes to the tax code to reduce what he considers disparities between wage earners and people with high incomes from investments.

==== Health care and Social Security ====
Bodnar has made lowering health care costs and protecting rural Montanans from changes to Medicaid central to his platform. He supports restoring Affordable Care Act subsidies, protecting Medicaid expansion, and access to a public insurance option alongside private market choices. He has proposed lifting the cap on income subject to Social Security payroll taxes, to address the trust fund’s projected insolvency.

==== Reproductive rights ====
Bodnar supports Montana’s constitutional protection of reproductive freedom and has said decisions about abortion belong to women and their doctors. He was endorsed by Planned Parenthood Action Fund in September 2026.

==== Gun rights ====
Bodnar, a gun owner, has said he supports the Second Amendment rights of law-abiding citizens, while also supporting efforts to keep guns away from criminals and people experiencing a mental health crisis, with due process protections.

==== Energy and the environment ====
Bodnar supports an “all-of-the-above” energy policy, including maintaining baseload power and developing wind and solar to lower utility costs, and has called for evaluating energy projects based on “engineering, technology, science, not ideology.”

==== Public lands ====
Bodnar made protecting public lands a campaign priority, citing public land access among his top concerns when he launched his candidacy. He described public lands as “our common ground” where “every Montanan, whether you’re a millionaire or make minimum wage, can hunt, fish and recreate,” and that protecting them “means preventing their sale.”

==== Immigration and border security ====
Bodnar has said violent criminals should be removed from the country, and that this can be done without infringing on Montanans’ individual liberties. He opposes abolishing U.S. Immigration and Customs Enforcement, favoring legislation to increase its accountability.

==== Veterans ====
Bodnar, a former Green Beret, has made veterans’ issues a focus of his campaign. At a veterans meet-and-greet in Bozeman in May 2026, he said “the promises this country made” to veterans “are broken,” citing wait times of more than a month for mental health appointments. He has described the stakes of those delays, saying it “might take a veteran experiencing a mental-health crisis a lifetime to develop the nerve to make that appointment, and then they wait one month to get in.” In July 2026, Bodnar was endorsed by VoteVets, a progressive veterans’ political organization that typically endorses Democratic candidates.

=== Campaign endorsements ===
Bodnar’s endorsers include Republican and Democratic former officeholders, as well as labor, conservation, veterans’, and reproductive rights organizations that traditionally support Democratic candidates. Four of the Montana Democratic Party’s five most recent chairs endorsed Bodnar, including Shannon O’Brien, who resigned as chair on October 12, 2026, in conjunction with her endorsement. Former Republican Governor Marc Racicot and former Democratic legislator Dorothy Bradley, opponents in Montana’s 1992 gubernatorial election, both endorsed him.

Several organizations that typically back Democratic candidates also endorsed Bodnar, including the veterans’ group VoteVets and the conservation organizations League of Conservation Voters, Montana Conservation Voters, and Montanans for Public Lands. In August 2026, the Montana Federation of Public Employees, the state’s largest union, endorsed Bodnar. In September 2026, Planned Parenthood Action Fund endorsed Bodnar, making him one of only two candidates nationally endorsed by the group that cycle who were not registered Democratic candidates.

== Personal life ==
Bodnar is married to Chelsea Bodnar, a pediatrician. The couple, who met as Rhodes Scholars, have three children and live in Missoula, Montana.

Bodnar also serves on the board of directors of the Missoula Economic Partnership.
