= Ebinger =

Ebinger is a surname. Notable people with the surname include:

- Blandine Ebinger (1899–1993), German actress
- Bob Ebinger (born 1944), American politician
- Josy Ebinger (1880–1955), Swiss-French businessman
- Rebecca Goodgame Ebinger (born 1975), American judge
