= Reilly Neill =

American polltician

Member of the Montana House of Representatives from the 62nd district
- In office January 7, 2013 – January 5, 2015
- Preceded by: Dan Skattum
- Succeeded by: Tom Woods

Personal details
- Born: September 7, 1973 (age 53) Dublin, Ireland
- Party: Democratic
- Spouse: Bradley Snow
- Children: 1 son
- Education: University of Montana (BA)

Reilly Neill (born September 7, 1973) is an American politician from Montana. A member of the Democratic Party, she served in the Montana House of Representatives for one term, from 2013 to 2015. She was a candidate for Montana's Class II Senate seat in 2026.

== Career ==
Neill served briefly as the interim executive director of the Park County Environmental Council in Livingston, Montana in 2015. Neill founded and published Livingston Current, a weekly newspaper that covered the arts, entertainment, and culture of Park County, Montana. from 2003 until 2012. She also published The Montana Press, a statewide arts and entertainment journal, from 2019 until 2021, which won numerous Society of Professional Journalism awards.

=== Montana House of Representatives ===
In 2012, Neill defeated Republican Dan Skattum for the state House District 62. While in office, she was a member of the Business and Labor Committee and Transportation Committee. She was active in climate change issues, succeeded in the Montana Department of Natural Resources and Conservation to consider climate variability and climate change as a number two priority when developing the state's 2014 20-year water plan and introducing legislation to study the effects of climate change on Montana's agricultural sector.

=== Post-legislative life ===
Neill published a book about her experience serving in the Montana State Capitol in Helena, “On the Floor: Tales from the Montana House.”

In June 2019, Neill was the first candidate to file paperwork for a 2020 bid for the Montana Governor's seat. She ended her campaign in January 2020.

Neill facilitated and organized numerous events for the Montana March for Reproductive Rights across the state and online both before and after the Dobbs decision. She continues to administer this non-profit group.

In 2024, Neill ran for the U.S. House of Representatives in Montana's 2nd congressional district as a write-in candidate. After the election, she announced her candidacy in 2026 U.S. Senate election. During the primary, Neill said that, if nominated, she would remain in the general election rather than withdraw in favor of independent candidate Seth Bodnar. Neill lost the Democratic Primary election to Alani Bankhead.

== Publications ==
- On The Floor (2014)

== Political positions ==
Neill, a Democrat, describes herself as a moderate Democrat and open-minded candidate with political philosophies and interests spanning traditional partisan lines.

== Personal life ==
Neill lives in Livingston, Montana. She has a son, Caen Klipp. Neill is married to Bradley Snow, the son of former US Secretary of the Treasury, John Snow, and great-grandson of former Montana US Senator Burton Wheeler.
