= Dan Skattum =

American politician

Member of the Montana House of Representatives from the 62nd district
- In office January 3, 2011 – January 7, 2013
- Preceded by: Bob Ebinger
- Succeeded by: Reilly Neill

Personal details
- Party: Republican

Dan Skattum is a Republican former member of the Montana Legislature. He was representative for House District 62 from 2011 to 2013, representing the Livingston area. He ran again in 2012, losing to Democrat Reilly Neill. In 2018, he faced Democrat Laurie Bishop to represent House District 60.
