= Emily Stonington =

American politician (1947–2019)

Emily Leigh Stonington Hibbard
- Stonington in 1982

Member of the Montana Senate from the 15th district
- In office 2001–2005
- Preceded by: Dorothy Eck
- Succeeded by: Jon Tester

Minority Leader of the Montana House of Representatives
- In office 1998–2001

Member of the Montana House of Representatives
- In office 1993–2001
- Preceded by: Dorothy Bradley
- Succeeded by: Christopher Harris
- Constituency: 79th district (1993-1995); 30th district (1995-2001)

Personal details
- Born: January 12, 1947 Oak Park, Illinois, US
- Died: June 26, 2019 (aged 72)
- Party: Democratic
- Education: Bennington College (BA); University of California, Berkeley (MA)

Emily Leigh Stonington Hibbard (formerly Emily Swanson (Note: During her time in the Montana House of Representatives, she was known under her married name of Emily Swanson. She and her husband divorced in 1995. In 2000, after winning election to the Montana Senate, she chose to go back to her maiden name of Stonington.); January 12, 1947 – June 26, 2019), was an American politician. A Democrat, she served four terms in the Montana House of Representatives and one term in the Montana Senate.

== Early life and education ==
Stonington was born on January 12, 1947 in Oak Park, Illinois, and raised in Denver, Colorado. She received her bachelor's degree in political science from Bennington College, and her master's degree in environmental education from the University of California, Berkeley.

== Career ==
Stonington moved to Bozeman, Montana, in 1969 to teach elementary school, but returned to Colorado in 1970, where she worked as an instructor for Outward Bound. She returned to Bozeman in 1979, where she built a house on land she had previously purchased. While the house was being built, Stonington lived in a tepee that she sewed together herself.

Stonington first ran for the Montana House of Representatives in 1982, winning the primary but losing the general election to Republican Robert A. Ellerd. She later served as executive director of the Montana Wildlife Federation for six years, and worked as an operations manager for Patagonia. In 1991, she worked as a campaign manager during Dorothy Bradley's campaign for Governor of Montana. Stonington organized a horseback ride across Montana as part of the campaign. She accompanied Bradley on the trip, which lasted 20 days and spanned 300 miles from Big Timber to Havre. Stonington said that she "fell in love" with the state during the trip, and it inspired her to run for Bradley's open seat in the Montana House of Representatives. She was elected in 1992, defeating Republican challenger Patricia Abelin, and was re-elected in 1994, 1996, and 1998. During her time in the House, she served on the committees for Fish and Game, Natural Resources, and Taxation. She was chosen to be House Minority Leader in November 1998.

Stonington won election to the Montana Senate in 2000, defeating Republican challenger Joe Barnett. During her term in the Senate, she also served as the chair of the Western Interstate Commission for Higher Education. In late 2003, Stonington announced that she would not run for re-election in 2004.

== Death ==
Stonington died on June 26, 2019, of pneumonia and idiopathic pulmonary fibrosis. She was 72.
