= Kurt Alme =

American lawyer (born 1966)

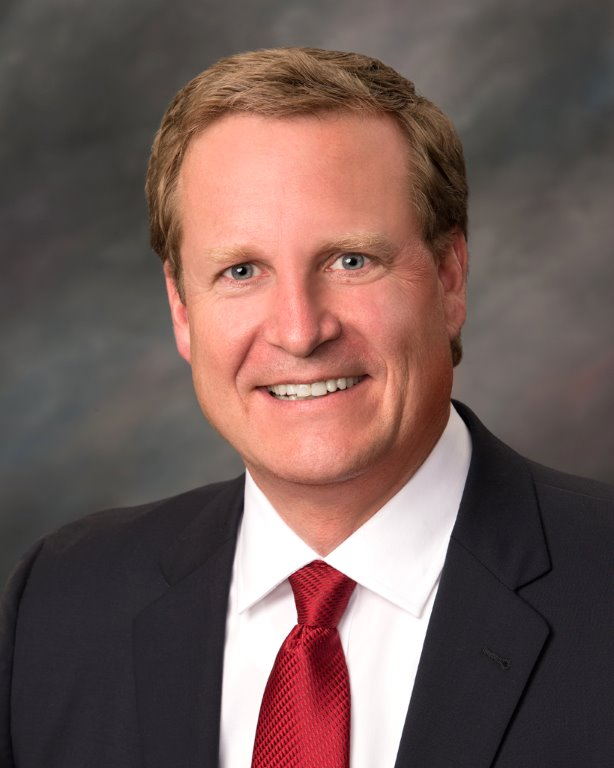
- Official portrait, 2017

United States Senator-elect from Montana
- Assuming office January 3, 2027
- Succeeding: Steve Daines

United States Attorney for the District of Montana
- In office March 17, 2025 – March 4, 2026; Acting: March 17, 2025 – October 7, 2025
- President: Donald Trump
- Preceded by: Jesse Laslovich
- Succeeded by: Timothy Racicot (acting)
- In office September 21, 2017 – December 2, 2020
- President: Donald Trump
- Preceded by: Michael W. Cotter
- Succeeded by: Jesse Laslovich

Personal details
- Born: Kurt Gordon Alme; October 7, 1966 (age 60) Great Falls, Montana, U.S.
- Party: Republican
- Education: University of Colorado, Boulder (BS); Harvard University (JD)
- Website: Campaign website

Kurt Gordon Alme (born October 7, 1966) is an American attorney and politician who is the United States senator-elect from Montana. From 2025 to 2026, he served as a United States attorney for the District of Montana. He resigned to run in the 2026 United States Senate election in Montana. He defeated independent candidate Seth Bodnar and Democratic nominee Alani Bankhead in the election.

Alme also served as the U.S. attorney from 2017 to 2020 during the first Trump administration. After stepping down in December 2020, he became the budget director in Montana Governor Greg Gianforte's administration.

== Early life and education ==
Alme was born in Great Falls, Montana, on October 7, 1966. After graduating from Custer County District High School in Miles City, Montana, he earned a Bachelor of Science academic degree in business from the University of Colorado at Boulder and a Juris Doctor from Harvard Law School.

== Career ==
Alme served as a judicial law clerk for Judge Charles C. Lovell of the United States District Court for the District of Montana. He was a partner with the law firm of Crowley, Haughey, Hanson, Toole & Dietrich, PLLP. From 2003 to 2010, Alme served in the U.S. Attorney's Office for the District of Montana, and from 2006 to 2010 he was the first assistant United States attorney. He also served as director of the Montana Department of Revenue.

Upon taking office as governor on January 4, 2021, Greg Gianforte named Alme as director of the state Office of Budget and Program Planning. Alme served until October 1, 2021, and was succeeded by Ryan Osmundson.

On March 17, 2025, Alme was sworn in to serve as interim U.S. attorney for the District of Montana.

Alme has served as president and general counsel of the Yellowstone Boys and Girls Ranch Foundation.

On March 4, 2026, Alme filed paperwork to run for the Senate seat of retiring incumbent Steve Daines. He filed eight minutes before the filing deadline and was endorsed by Daines, Gianforte, and President Trump. He won the Republican nomination and defeated independent candidate Seth Bodnar and Democratic nominee Alani Bankhead in the general election.

== Electoral history ==
2026 United States Senate Republican primary
Party	Candidate	Votes	%
Republican	Kurt Alme	128,716	76.1%
Republican	Lee Calhoun	23,872	14.1%
Republican	Charles WalkingChild	16,474	9.7%
Total votes		169,062	100.00%

== Notes ==
Party political offices
Preceded by Steve Daines	Republican nominee for U.S. Senator from Montana (Class 2); 2026	Most recent
U.S. Senate
Preceded by Steve Daines	U.S. Senator (Class 2) from Montana; Taking office 2027; Served alongside: Tim Sheehy	Elect
