= 1992 Montana gubernatorial election =

- November 3, 1992
- Turnout: 78.90%▲3.90
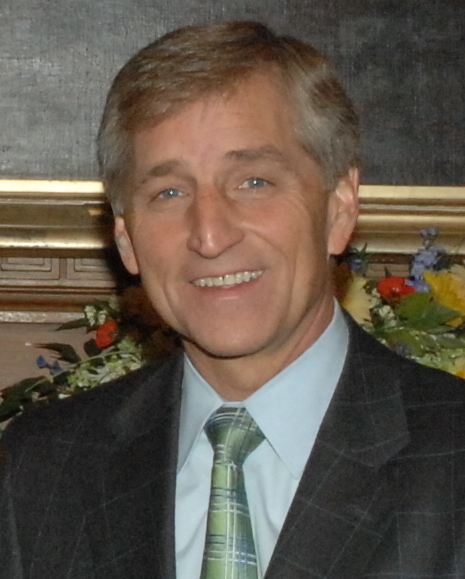

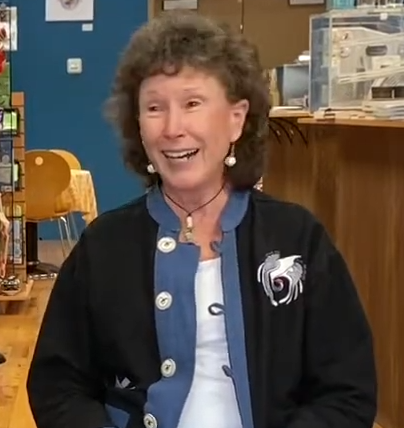
Nominee	Marc Racicot	Dorothy Bradley
Party	Republican	Democratic
Running mate	Denny Rehberg	Mike Halligan
Popular vote	209,401	198,421
Percentage	51.35%	48.65%
- County results Racicot: 50–60% 60–70% 70–80% Bradley: 50–60% 60–70% 70–80%
Governor before election
Stan Stephens
Republican
Elected Governor
Marc Racicot
Republican

The 1992 Montana gubernatorial election took place on November 3, 1992. Incumbent Governor of Montana Stan Stephens, who was first elected in 1988, declined to seek re-election. Marc Racicot, the Attorney General of Montana, won the Republican primary and advanced to the general election, where he faced State Representative Dorothy Bradley, who had emerged from a crowded Democratic primary as the nominee of her party. A close election ensued, but in the end, Racicot ended up defeating Bradley to win his first of two terms as governor. While on the same ballot, Democratic presidential candidate Bill Clinton won the state of Montana, and eventually won the 1992 United States presidential election.

== Democratic primary ==
=== Candidates ===
- Dorothy Bradley, State Representative
- Mike McGrath, Lewis and Clark County Attorney
- Frank B. Morrison, Jr., former Montana Supreme Court Associate Justice
- Bob Kelleher, perennial candidate
- Martin J. "Red" Beckman
- Curly Thornton

=== Results ===
Democratic Party primary results
Party	Candidate	Votes	%
Democratic	Dorothy Bradley	54,453	41.17
Democratic	Mike McGrath	44,323	33.51
Democratic	Frank B. Morrison, Jr.	23,883	18.06
Democratic	Bob Kelleher	4,216	3.19
Democratic	Martin J. "Red" Beckman	2,773	2.10
Democratic	Curly Thornton	2,628	1.99
Total votes		132,276	100.00

== Republican primary ==
=== Candidates ===
- Marc Racicot, Attorney General of Montana
- Andrea Bennett, Montana State Auditor

=== Results ===
Republican Primary results
Party	Candidate	Votes	%
Republican	Marc Racicot	68,013	68.66
Republican	Andrea Bennett	31,038	31.34
Total votes		99,051	100.00

== General election ==
=== Results ===
Montana gubernatorial election, 1992
Party	Candidate	Votes	%	±%
Republican	Marc Racicot	209,401	51.35%	−0.59%
Democratic	Dorothy Bradley	198,421	48.65%	+2.52%
Majority		10,980	2.69%	−3.11%
Turnout		407,822		
Republican hold		Swing		

==== By county ====
	Marc Racicot Republican		Dorothy Bradley Democratic		Margin		Total
County	Votes	%	Votes	%	Votes	%	Votes
Beaverhead	2,553	61.94%	1,569	38.06%	984	23.87%	4,122
Big Horn	1,827	41.92%	2,531	58.08%	-704	-16.15%	4,358
Blaine	1,319	43.95%	1,682	56.05%	-363	-8.33%	3,001
Broadwater	1,155	63.74%	657	36.26%	498	27.48%	1,812
Carbon	2,566	54.82%	2,115	45.18%	283	9.63%	4,681
Carter	637	74.77%	215	25.23%	422	49.53%	852
Cascade	16,819	46.43%	19,405	53.57%	-2,586	-7.14%	36,224
Chouteau	1,818	56.92%	1,376	43.08%	442	13.84%	3,194
Custer	2,936	52.48%	2,658	47.52%	278	4.97%	5,594
Daniels	820	60.70%	531	39.30%	289	21.39%	1,351
Dawson	2,607	53.81%'	2,238	46.19%	369	7.61%	4,845
Deer Lodge	1,510	29.17%	3,667	70.83%	-2,157	-41.67%	5,177
Fallon	980	62.34%	592	37.66%	288	18.32%	1,572
Fergus	3,973	61.26%	2,512	38.74%	1,461	22.53%	6,485
Flathead	17,538	56.23%	13,652	43.77%	3,886	12.46%	31,190
Gallatin	15,654	54.69%	12,969	45.31%	2,685	9.38%	28,623
Garfield	607	75.31%	199	24.69%	408	50.62%	806
Glacier	1,701	39.17%	2,642	60.83%	-941	-21.67%	4,343
Golden Valley	308	62.86%	182	37.14%	126	25.71%	490
Granite	821	62.72%	488	37.28%	333	25.44%	1,309
Hill	3,447	42.93%	4,582	57.07%	-1,135	-14.14%	8,029
Jefferson	2,231	52.85%	1,990	47.15%	241	5.71%	4,221
Judith Basin	896	62.57%	536	37.43%	360	25.14%	1,432
Lake	5,475	52.28%	4,998	47.72%	477	4.55%	10,473
Lewis and Clark	13,115	50.24%	12,988	49.76%	127	0.49%	26,103
Liberty	755	62.29%	457	37.71%	298	24.59%	1,212
Lincoln	4,588	55.71%	3,648	44.29%	940	11.41%	8,236
Madison	2,148	65.91%	1,111	34.09%	1,037	31.82%	3,259
McCone	808	59.99%	539	40.01%	269	19.97%	1,347
Meagher	579	58.78%	406	41.22%	171	17.36%	985
Mineral	682	42.23%	933	57.77%	-251	-15.54%	1,615
Missoula	18,531	43.11%	24,453	56.89%	-5,922	-13.78%	42,984
Musselshell	1,483	67.29%	721	32.71%	762	34.57%	2,204
Park	4,288	57.60%	3,156	42.40%	1,132	15.21%	7,444
Petroleum	204	68.92%	92	31.08%	112	37.84%	296
Phillips	1,720	66.05%	884	33.95%	836	32.10%	2,604
Pondera	1,892	59.59%	1,283	40.41%	609	19.18%	3,175
Powder River	646	62.84%	382	37.16%	264	25.68%	1,028
Powell	1,562	52.99%	1,386	47.01%	176	5.97%	2,948
Prairie	539	63.86%	305	36.14%	234	27.73%	844
Ravalli	8,814	59.34%	6,040	40.66%	2,774	18.68%	14,854
Richland	2,722	57.55%	2,008	42.45%	714	15.10%	4,730
Roosevelt	1,765	42.47%	2,391	57.53%	-626	-15.06%	4,156
Rosebud	1,716	43.55%	2,224	56.45%	-508	-12.89%	3,940
Sanders	2,352	53.07%	2,080	46.93%	272	6.14%	4,432
Sheridan	1,161	44.26%	1,462	55.74%	-301	-11.48%	2,623
Silver Bow	6,528	36.27%	11,470	63.73%	-4,958	-27.55%	17,998
Stillwater	2,113	58.27%	1,513	41.73%	600	16.55%	3,626
Sweet Grass	1,233	69.50%	541	30.50%	692	39.01%	1,774
Teton	2,018	60.08%	1,341	39.92%	677	20.15%	3,359
Toole	1,539	57.02%	1,160	42.98%	379	10.34%	2,699
Treasure	344	63.24%	200	36.76%	144	26.44%	544
Valley	2,278	52.55%	2,057	47.45%	221	5.10%	4,335
Wheatland	672	59.05%	466	40.95%	206	18.10%	1,138
Wibaux	383	64.05%	215	35.95%	168	28.09%	598
Yellowstone	30,025	53.11%	26,513	46.89%	3,512	6.21%	56,538

Counties that flipped from Democratic to Republican

- Custer
- Dawson
- Lewis and Clark
- Lincoln
- Powell
- Wibaux
- Valley

Counties that flipped from Republican to Democratic

- Sheridan
- Cascade
- Missoula
