= Forward Montana =

U.S. non-profit organization

Forward Montana is a left-leaning 501(c)(4) non-profit organization located in Missoula, Montana. It is described as a "non-profit, non-partisan organization dedicated to training, mobilizing, and electing a new generation of progressive leaders in Montana". It was co-founded by Billings-born blogger Matt Singer, along with several members of the Montana Public Interest Research Group and The Associated Students of The University of Montana, in 2006.

== Activities ==
Forward Montana played a critical role in the 2007 municipal election in Missoula, unseating conservative incumbent Missoula City Council member Don Nicolson in a close race with progressive candidate Pam Walzer. The organization used their Pink Bunnies campaign to register young voters and turn them out for the election. The campaign proved interesting enough to warrant Missoula Mayor John Engen to issue a proclamation, making the day before voter registration closed "Official Pink Bunny Day" citywide. The campaign registered more than 1,000 voters—more than one-third of all the city's new registrants.

Forward Montana also helped turn out hundreds of voters using candidate forums like Candidates Gone Wild, in which candidate's ideas were presented as a talent show rather than in standard Q&A style forums.

After two members of Missoula's LGBTQ community were physically assaulted, Forward Montana co-organized the rally "We Are Missoula... Stand Up, Speak OUT!" The rally drew over 300 people, with help from groups like Western Montana Gay & Lesbian Community Center and the YWCA of Missoula.

In 2012, Forward Montana registered more than 10,000 people to vote across the state, making it the largest third-party voter registration effort in Montana's history.
