= Bob Ebinger =

American politician

Member of the Montana House of Representatives from the 62nd district
- In office January 3, 2007 – January 3, 2011
- Succeeded by: Dan Skattum

Personal details
- Born: December 26, 1944 (age 81) Columbus, Ohio, United States
- Party: Democratic
- Spouse: Robin Hoggan
- Education: Trinity College, University of Southern California
- Occupation: photographer, real estate development

Bob Ebinger (born 26 December 1944) is a Democratic Party member of the Montana House of Representatives, representing District 62 from 2007-2011.
