= Mike Halligan =

American politician

Member of the Montana State Senate
- In office 1980–2001

Personal details
- Born: July 9, 1949 (age 77) Jamestown, North Dakota, U.S.
- Party: Democratic
- Education: University of Montana
- Profession: Attorney

Michael L. Halligan (born July 9, 1949) is an American politician in the state of Montana. He served in the Montana State Senate from 1980 to 2001. From 1995 to 1997 he was minority leader of the Senate. An attorney, Halligan attended the University of Montana, where he earned his J.D. degree. He was deputy Missoula County Attorney from 1985 to 1990.
