= Dorothy Bradley =

American former politician from Montana

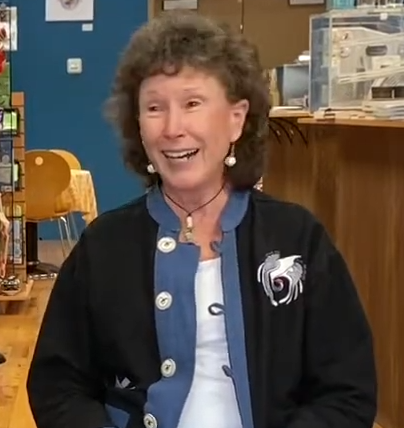
- Bradley in 2021

Member of the Montana House of Representatives
- In office January 1985 – January 1993
- Succeeded by: Emily Stonington
- In office January 1971 – January 1979

Personal details
- Born: February 24, 1947 (age 79) Madison, Wisconsin, U.S.
- Party: Democratic
- Education: Colorado College (BA); American University (JD)

Dorothy Maynard Bradley (born February 24, 1947) is an American former politician from Montana. She was elected to eight terms in the Montana House of Representatives, serving from 1971 to 1978 and 1985 to 1992. Bradley now lives in Clyde Park, Montana.

== Early life and education ==
Born in Madison, Wisconsin in 1947, she attended law school in Washington DC and worked for the state water court. She also briefly taught at a small rural school next to the Northern Cheyenne Indian Reservation, was the Director of the Montana State University Water Center, and was the District Court Administrator and staff for the Gallatin County Criminal Justice Coordinating Council for seven years. She joined the American Prairie Foundation National Council in 2008.

== Career ==
Bradley was elected to eight terms in the Montana House of Representatives, serving from 1971 to 1978 and 1985 to 1992. She ran for Congress in 1978, but lost in the primary to Pat Williams. When incumbent Governor of Montana Stan Stephens declined to seek re-election in 1992, Bradley ran to succeed him. She won a close and competitive Democratic primary against Mike McGrath and Frank B. Morrison, Jr., and advanced to the general election, where she faced State Attorney General Marc Racicot. She was narrowly defeated by Racicot.

== Electoral history ==
1992 Democratic gubernatorial primary
Party	Candidate	Votes	%
Democratic	Dorothy Bradley	54,453	41.17%
Democratic	Mike McGrath	44,323	33.51%
Democratic	Frank B. Morrison, Jr.	23,883	18.06%
Democratic	Bob Kelleher	4,216	3.19%
Democratic	Martin J. "Red" Beckman	2,773	2.10%
Democratic	Curly Thornton	2,628	1.99%
Total votes		132,276	100.00%

1992 Montana gubernatorial election
Party	Candidate	Votes	%	±%
Republican	Marc Racicot	209,401	51.35%	−0.59%
Democratic	Dorothy Bradley	198,421	48.65%	+2.52%
Total votes		407,822	100.00%	+11.12%
Majority		10,980	2.69%	−3.11%
Republican hold		Swing		

Party political offices
Preceded by Thomas Judge	Democratic nominee for Governor of Montana; 1992	Succeeded by Chet Blaylock; Deceased
