= 2016 Montana elections =

- November 8, 2016

A general election was held in the state of Montana on November 8, 2016, with primaries being held on June 7, 2016. All six executive offices were up for election, as well as the state's U.S. House seat and the state legislature.

== Federal elections ==
=== President ===
2016 United States presidential election in Montana
Party	Candidate	Votes	%	±%
Republican	Donald Trump	279,240	56.17	▲0.82
Democratic	Hillary Clinton	177,709	35.75	▼5.95
Libertarian	Gary Johnson	28,037	5.64	▲2.71
Green	Jill Stein	7,970	1.60	Steady
Write-in	Evan McMullin	2,297	0.46	Steady
American Delta	Rocky De La Fuente	1,570	0.32	Steady
Write-in		324	0.06	Steady
Total votes		497,147	100.00	
Republican win				

=== House of Representatives ===
2016 Montana's at-large congressional district election
Party	Candidate	Votes	%	±%
Republican	Ryan Zinke (incumbent)	285,358	56.19	▲0.78
Democratic	Denise Juneau	205,919	40.55	▲0.14
Libertarian	Rick Breckenridge	16,554	3.26	▼0.92
Total votes		507,831	100.00	
Republican hold				

== Governor ==
2016 Montana gubernatorial election
Party	Candidate	Votes	%	±%
Democratic	Steve Bullock (incumbent)	255,933	50.25	▲1.35
Republican	Greg Gianforte	236,115	46.35	▼0.99
Libertarian	Ted Dunlap	17,312	3.40	▼0.36
Total votes		509,360	100.00	
Democratic hold				

== Secretary of State ==
Incumbent Democratic secretary of state Linda McCulloch was term-limited and could not seek a third term. State Auditor Monica J. Lindeen became the Democratic nominee, while senate minority leader Corey Stapleton was the Republican nominee. Stapleton defeated Lindeen in the general election.

2016 Montana Secretary of State election
Party	Candidate	Votes	%	±%
Republican	Corey Stapleton	277,473	55.49	▲10.39
Democratic	Monica J. Lindeen	204,861	40.97	▼10.44
Libertarian	Roger Roots	17,687	3.54	▲0.05
Total votes		500,021	100.00	
Republican gain from Democratic				

== Attorney General ==
2016 Montana Attorney General election
- November 8, 2016
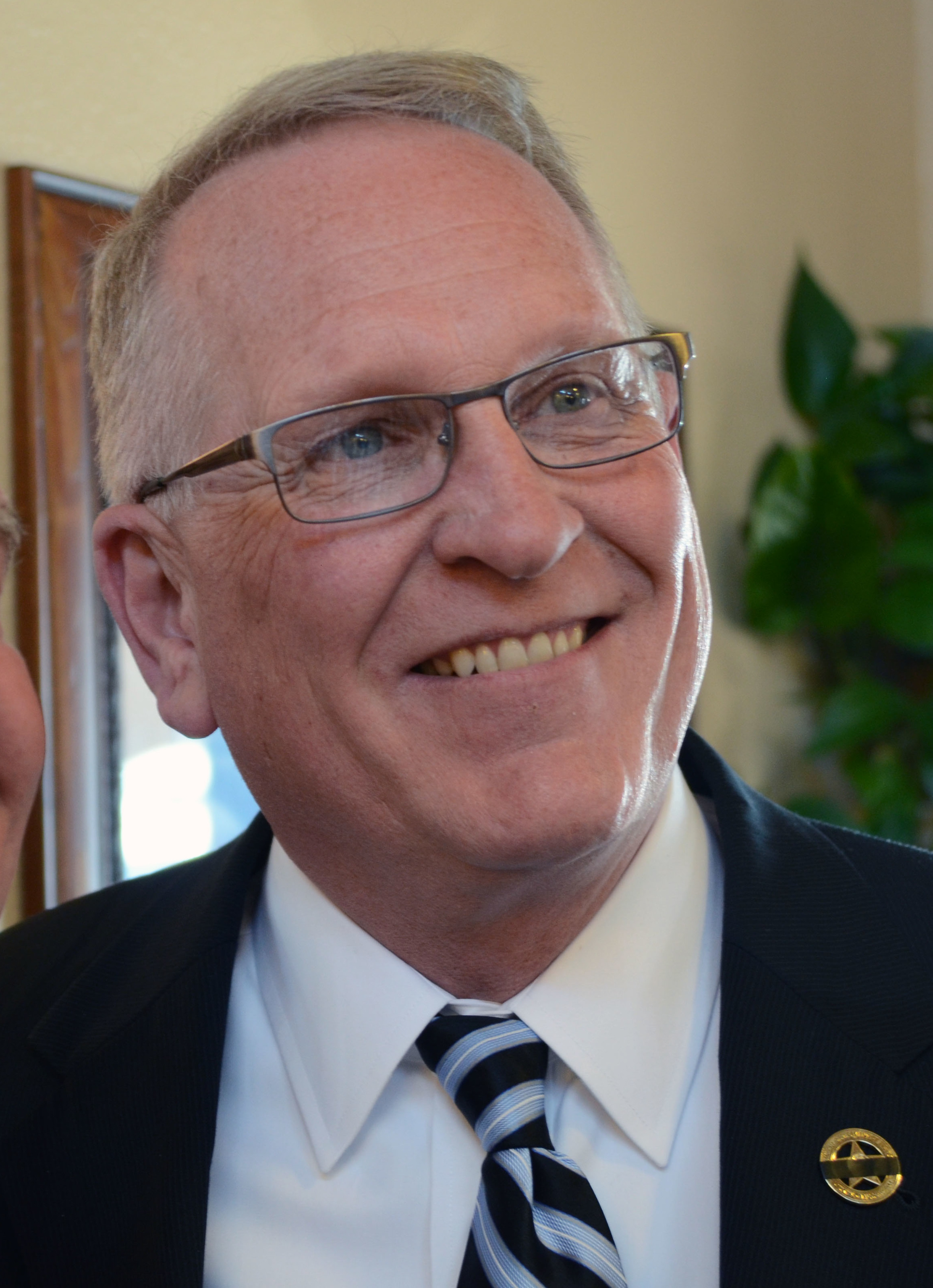

Nominee	Tim Fox	Larry Jent
Party	Republican	Democratic
Popular vote	332,766	158,970
Percentage	67.67%	32.33%
- County results Fox: 50–60% 60–70% 70–80% 80–90% >90% Jent: 50–60% 60–70%
Attorney General before election
Tim Fox
Republican
Elected Attorney General
Tim Fox
Republican

Incumbent Republican Attorney General Tim Fox ran for election to a second term. He was easily re-elected over state senator Larry Jent.

=== Republican primary ===
Republican primary
Party	Candidate	Votes	%
Republican	Tim Fox (incumbent)	140,173	100.00
Total votes		140,173	100.00

=== Democratic primary ===
Democratic primary
Party	Candidate	Votes	%
Democratic	Larry Jent	102,171	100.00
Total votes		102,171	100.00

=== General election ===
==== Predictions ====
Source	Ranking
Governing	Safe R

2016 Montana Attorney General election
Party	Candidate	Votes	%	±%
Republican	Tim Fox (incumbent)	332,766	67.67	▲13.99
Democratic	Larry Jent	158,970	32.33	▼13.99
Total votes		491,736	100.00	
Republican hold				

== Auditor ==
2016 Montana State Auditor election
- November 8, 2016
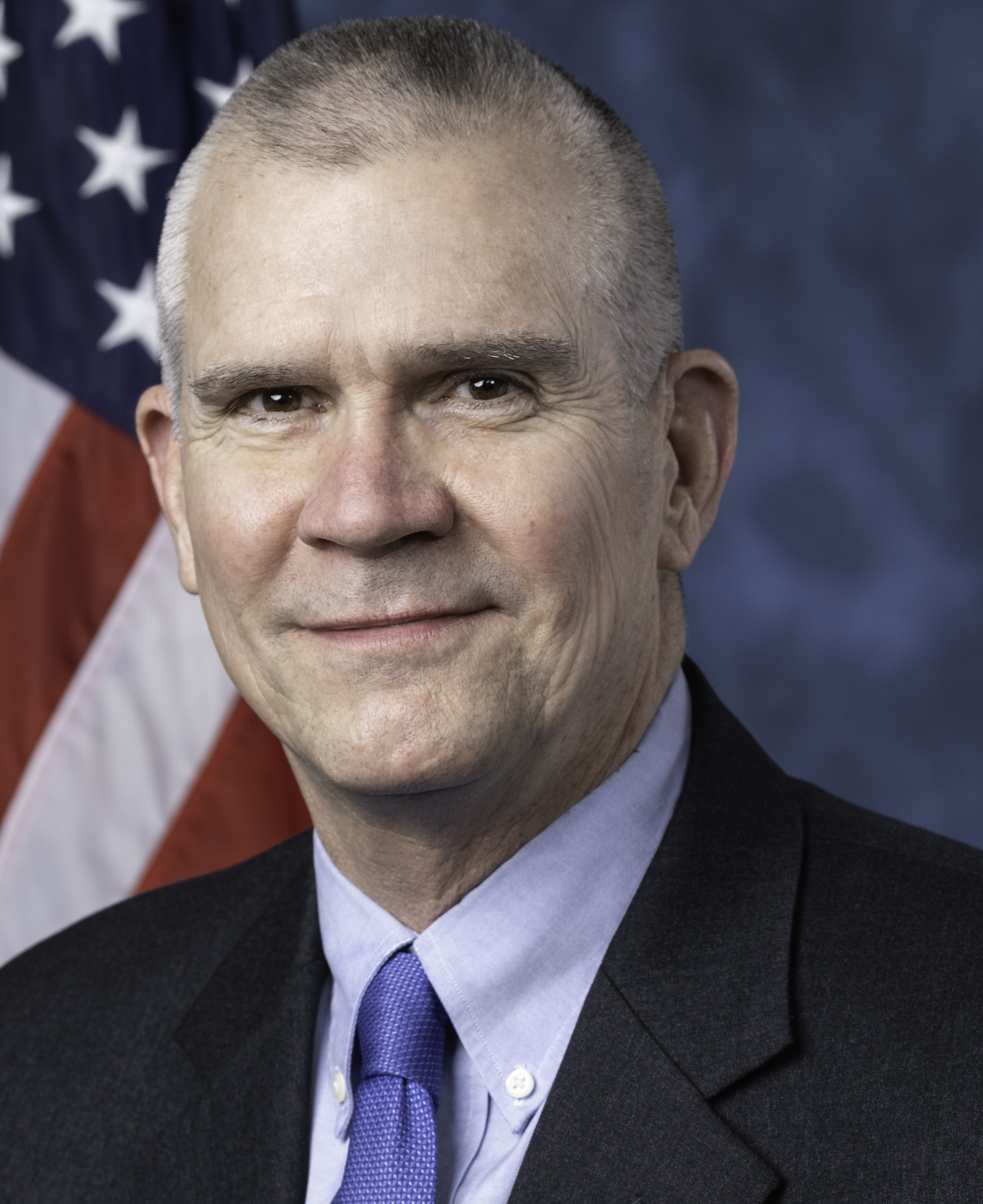

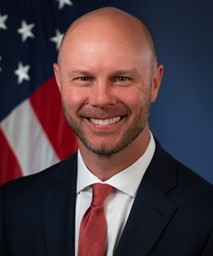
Nominee	Matt Rosendale	Jesse Laslovich
Party	Republican	Democratic
Popular vote	262,045	224,925
Percentage	53.81%	46.19%
- County results Rosendale: 50–60% 60–70% 70–80% 80–90% Laslovich: 50–60% 60–70% 70–80% 80–90%
State Auditor before election
Monica J. Lindeen
Democratic
Elected State Auditor
Matt Rosendale
Republican

Incumbent Democratic State Auditor Monica J. Lindeen was term-limited and could not run for re-election. Lindeen's chief legal counsel Jesse Laslovich was nominated by the Democratic Party to succeed her. State senator Matt Rosendale became the Republican nominee. Rosendale defeated Laslovich in the general election.

=== Democratic primary ===
Democratic primary
Party	Candidate	Votes	%
Democratic	Jesse Laslovich	103,972	100.00
Total votes		103,972	100.00

=== Republican primary ===
Republican primary
Party	Candidate	Votes	%
Republican	Matt Rosendale	132,813	100.00
Total votes		132,813	100.00

=== General election ===
2016 Montana State Auditor election
Party	Candidate	Votes	%	±%
Republican	Matt Rosendale	262,045	53.81	▲7.33
Democratic	Jesse Laslovich	224,925	46.19	▼7.33
Total votes		486,970	100.00	
Republican gain from Democratic				

== Superintendent of Public Instruction ==
2016 Montana Superintendent of Public Instruction election
- November 8, 2016
Nominee	Elsie Arntzen	Melissa Romano
Party	Republican	Democratic
Popular vote	262,045	237,590
Percentage	51.65%	48.35%
- County results Arntzen: 50–60% 60–70% 70–80% 80–90% Romano: 50–60% 60–70% 70–80%
Superintendent of Public Instruction before election
Denise Juneau
Democratic
Elected Superintendent of Public Instruction
Elsie Arntzen
Republican

Incumbent Democratic Superintendent of Public Instruction Denise Juneau was term-limited and could not run for re-election. Melissa Romano, an elementary school teacher, was the Democratic nominee. State senator Elsie Arntzen became the Republican nominee. Arntzen won the election by a small margin.

=== Democratic primary ===
Democratic primary
Party	Candidate	Votes	%
Democratic	Melissa Romano	103,951	100.00
Total votes		103,951	100.00

=== Republican primary ===
Republican primary
Party	Candidate	Votes	%
Republican	Elsie Arntzen	129,851	100.00
Total votes		129,851	100.00

=== General election ===
2016 Montana Superintendent of Public Instruction election
Party	Candidate	Votes	%	±%
Republican	Elsie Arntzen	253,790	51.65	▲1.89
Democratic	Melissa Romano	237,590	48.35	▼1.89
Total votes		491,380	100.00	
Republican gain from Democratic				

== Public Service Commission ==
Three seats of the Montana Public Service Commission were up for election.

=== District 2 ===
Incumbent Republican commissioner Kirk Bushman ran for re-election to a second term. He lost renomination to Tony O'Donnell, who won the general election unopposed.

==== Republican primary ====
Republican primary
Party	Candidate	Votes	%
Republican	Tony O'Donnell	15,132	51.12
Republican	Kirk Bushman (incumbent)	14,470	48.88
Total votes		29,602	100.00

==== General election ====
2016 Montana Public Service Commission District 2 election
Party	Candidate	Votes	%	±%
Republican	Tony O'Donnell	76,142	100.00	▲47.33
Total votes		76,142	100.00	
Republican hold				

=== District 3 ===
Incumbent Republican commissioner Roger Koopman ran for re-election to a second term. State representative Pat Noonan became the Democratic nominee, while Caron Cooper ran as an independent candidate. Koopman won re-election.

==== Republican primary ====
Republican primary
Party	Candidate	Votes	%
Republican	Roger Koopman	27,427	100.00
Total votes		27,427	100.00

==== Democratic primary ====
Democratic primary
Party	Candidate	Votes	%
Democratic	Pat Noonan	25,830	100.00
Total votes		25,830	100.00

==== General election ====
2016 Montana Public Service Commission District 3 election
Party	Candidate	Votes	%	±%
Republican	Roger Koopman (incumbent)	54,981	49.22	▼1.66
Democratic	Pat Noonan	41,458	37.11	▼12.01
Independent	Caron Cooper	15,269	13.67	Steady
Total votes		96,439	100.00	
Republican hold				

=== District 4 ===
Incumbent Republican commissioner Bob Lake ran for re-election to a second term. Democratic former commissioner Gail Gutsche won a three-way primary to run in a rematch against Lake.

==== Republican primary ====
Republican primary
Party	Candidate	Votes	%
Republican	Bob Lake	23,512	100.00
Total votes		23,512	100.00

==== Democratic primary ====
Democratic primary
Party	Candidate	Votes	%
Democratic	Gail Gutsche	14,804	58.20
Democratic	Mark Sweeney	7,926	31.16
Democratic	Lee Tavenner	2,707	10.64
Total votes		25,437	100.00

==== General election ====
2016 Montana Public Service Commission District 4 election
Party	Candidate	Votes	%	±%
Republican	Bob Lake	54,705	54.41	▲3.01
Democratic	Gail Gutsche	45,842	45.59	▼3.01
Total votes		100,547	100.00	
Republican hold				

== Legislature ==
Half of the seats in the Montana Senate and all of the Montana House of Representatives were up for election. The Republican Party expanded their control of the senate while there were no changes in the house regarding seats.

Senate
Party	Before	After	Change
Republican	29	32	▲3
Democratic	21	18	▼3
Total	50	50	

House of Representatives
Party	Before	After	Change
Republican	59	59	Steady
Democratic	41	41	Steady
Total	100	100	
