= Women in the Montana government =

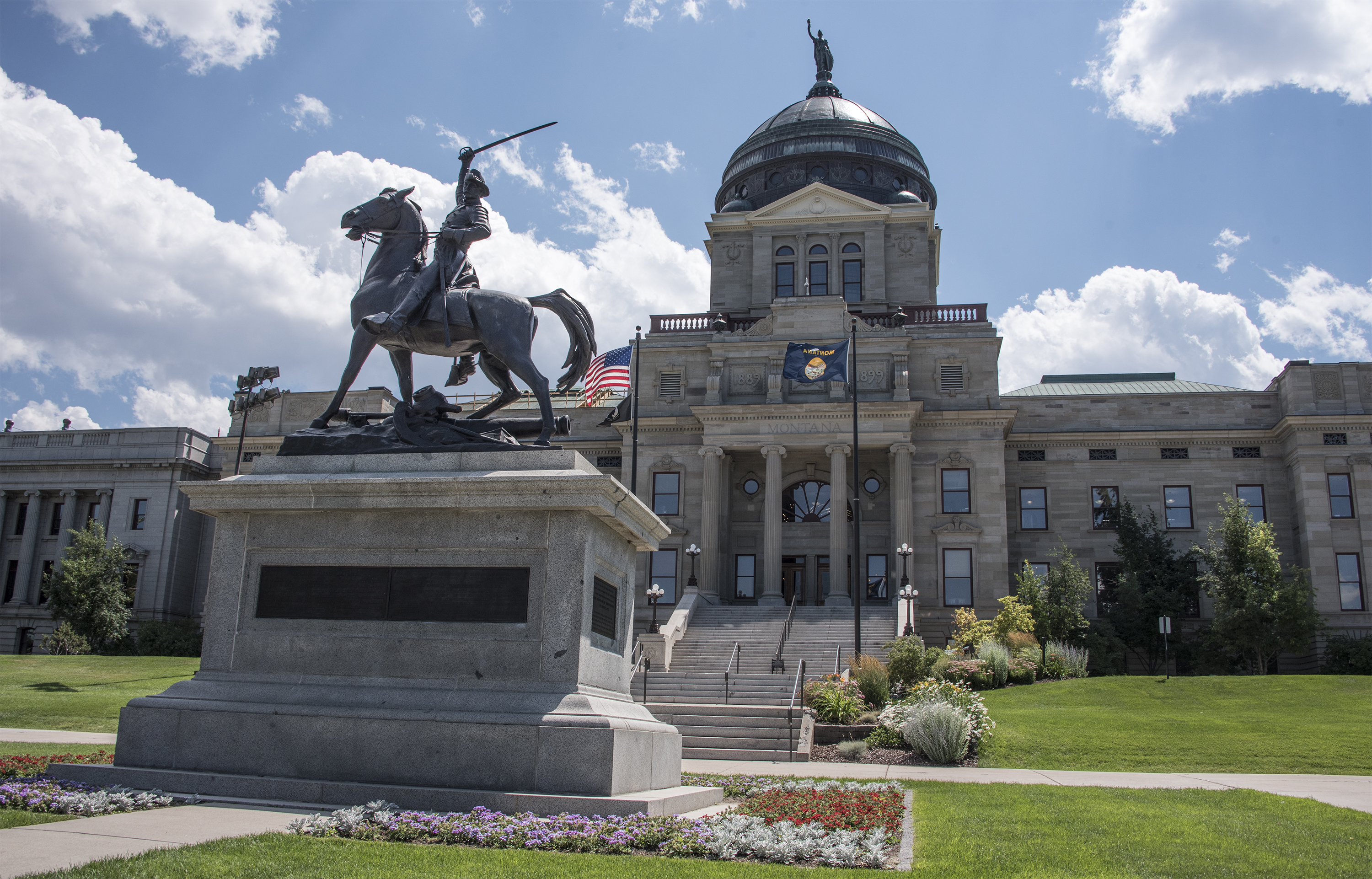
Montana Capitol Building

As of 2022, Montana ranked 22nd out of 50 American states in terms of percentage of state legislators who are women. Within the Montana State Legislature, 32.7 percent of all members were women in 2022. From statehood in 1889 to 2025, the state of Montana had only one female governor, Judy Martz. Although the first woman to be elected to the United States Congress was Jeannette Rankin from Montana in 1916, the state had not elected another woman to Congress as of 2026 (though Rankin herself was re-elected in 1940).

== Early participation of women in public office ==
Helen Clarke and Alice Nichols were the first women elected to any public office in Montana Territory in 1882, both as county school superintendents. Since then, the majority of county superintendents in Montana have been women.

In 1916, Jeannette Rankin became the first woman to be elected to the United States Congress. She was elected to one of Montana's two seats in the United States House of Representatives, two years after white women were given the right to vote in Montana, and four years before women were nationally enfranchised in the 19th Amendment.

== Executive branch ==
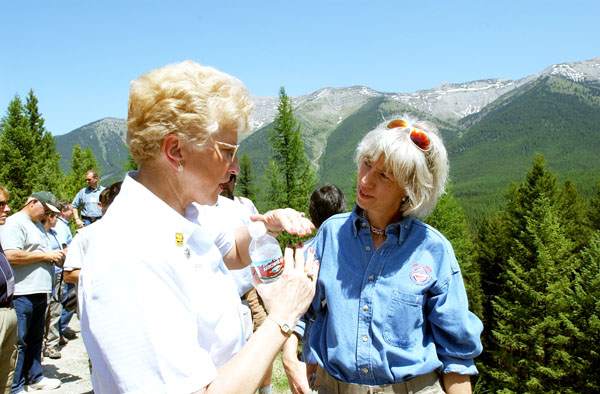
Montana Governor Judy Martz (left) during the Forest Health Summit

=== Elected office ===
The only woman elected as governor of Montana, as of 2025, is Republican Judy Martz who held office from 2001 to 2005, and did not seek a second term. She was known for her income and capital gains tax cuts, as well as a budget surplus at the end of her term. Additionally, Martz led the push for the federal Healthy Forest Act amongst fellow governors.

There have only been three female lieutenant governors out of the total 37 people who have served in the position. The current lieutenant governor of Montana is a Republican woman, Kristan Juras. She has served since 2021, and is a lawyer who had previously ran for the Montana Supreme Court in 2016, but was unsuccessful. The first lieutenant governor was Republican Judy Martz, who served in the position from 1997 to 2001, under Republican Governor Marc Racicot. The first female Democratic lieutenant governor was Angela McLean, who served as lieutenant governor from 2014 to 2015 under Governor Steve Bullock. She resigned from the position in 2015 because of her impending appointment to the Office of the Commissioner of Higher Education.

As of 2022, the Montana Secretary of State is a woman, Republican Christi Jacobsen. Of the 22 people who have served in the position, there have been two women. The first was Democrat Linda McCulloch who became the first female Secretary of State from 2009 to 2017. McCulloch previously served in the Montana House of Representatives for six years, and as a superintendent of public instruction. There has never been a female attorney general in the state of Montana. The first woman to run for attorney general in Montana was Ella Knowles. Following her successful lobbying of the 1889 Montana Legislature to allow women to take the bar exam, Knowles became be first lawyer in the state of Montana and the first female notary. She was the first woman to run for Montana attorney general on the 1892 populist ticket.

The position of superintendent of public instruction has overall shown the most representation for women in any executive branch position for the Montana government. The current superintendent of public instruction is a woman, Elsie Arntzen. First elected in 2016, she is now in her second term in the position. Prior to serving in this position, she served in the Montana Legislature—both in the House and the Senate—as a Republican. Since 1889, six of the superintendents of public instruction have been men, and the remaining other 11 who have served have been women. The first woman to be elected to the position was Mary Trumper in 1916, who went on to serve for 12 years. During her term, she instituted many reforms that female county superintendents had been proponents for, such as improved teacher training and certificate exams and the statewide mandated 180 day school term. Five of the six men elected to the position were before the appointment of Mary Trumper; following her term, all but one of the superintendents of public instruction have been women.

Women in Statewide Elected Executive Office in Montana
Name	Party	Position	Years served
Christi Jacobsen	Republican	Secretary of State	2021–
Kristen Juras	Republican	Lieutenant Governor	2021–
Elsie M. Arntzen	Republican	Superintendent of Public Instruction	2017–
Angela McLean	Democratic	Lieutenant Governor	2014–2015*
Denise Juneau	Democratic	Superintendent of Public Instruction	2009–2016
Monica J. Lindeen	Democratic	Auditor	2009–2016
Linda H. McCulloch	Democratic	Secretary of State	2009–2016
Linda H. McCulloch	Democratic	Superintendent of Public Instruction	2001–2008
Judy Martz	Republican	Governor	2001–2004
Judy Martz	Republican	Lieutenant Governor	1997–2000
Nancy A. Keenan	Democratic	Superintendent of Public Instruction	1989–2000
Andrea Bennett	Republican	Auditor	1985–1992
Georgia Ruth Rice	Democratic	Superintendent of Public Instruction	1977–1980
Hollis G. Connors	Republican	Treasurer	1973–1976
Dolores Colburg	Democratic	Superintendent of Public Instruction	1969–1976
Edna J. Hinman	Republican	Treasurer	1961–1964*
Mary M. Condon	Democratic	Superintendent of Public Instruction	1949–1956
Alta E. Fisher	Republican	Treasurer	1949–1952*
Elizabeth Ireland	Republican	Superintendent of Public Instruction	1933–1948
May Trumper	Republican	Superintendent of Public Instruction	1917–1932

*Appointed.

=== Employees ===
In calendar year 2020, there were 11,450 full- and part-time employees in the executive branch of the Montana state government. According to the Montana Department of Administration, there were nearly equal numbers of women and men in the executive branch workforce.

== Legislative branch ==
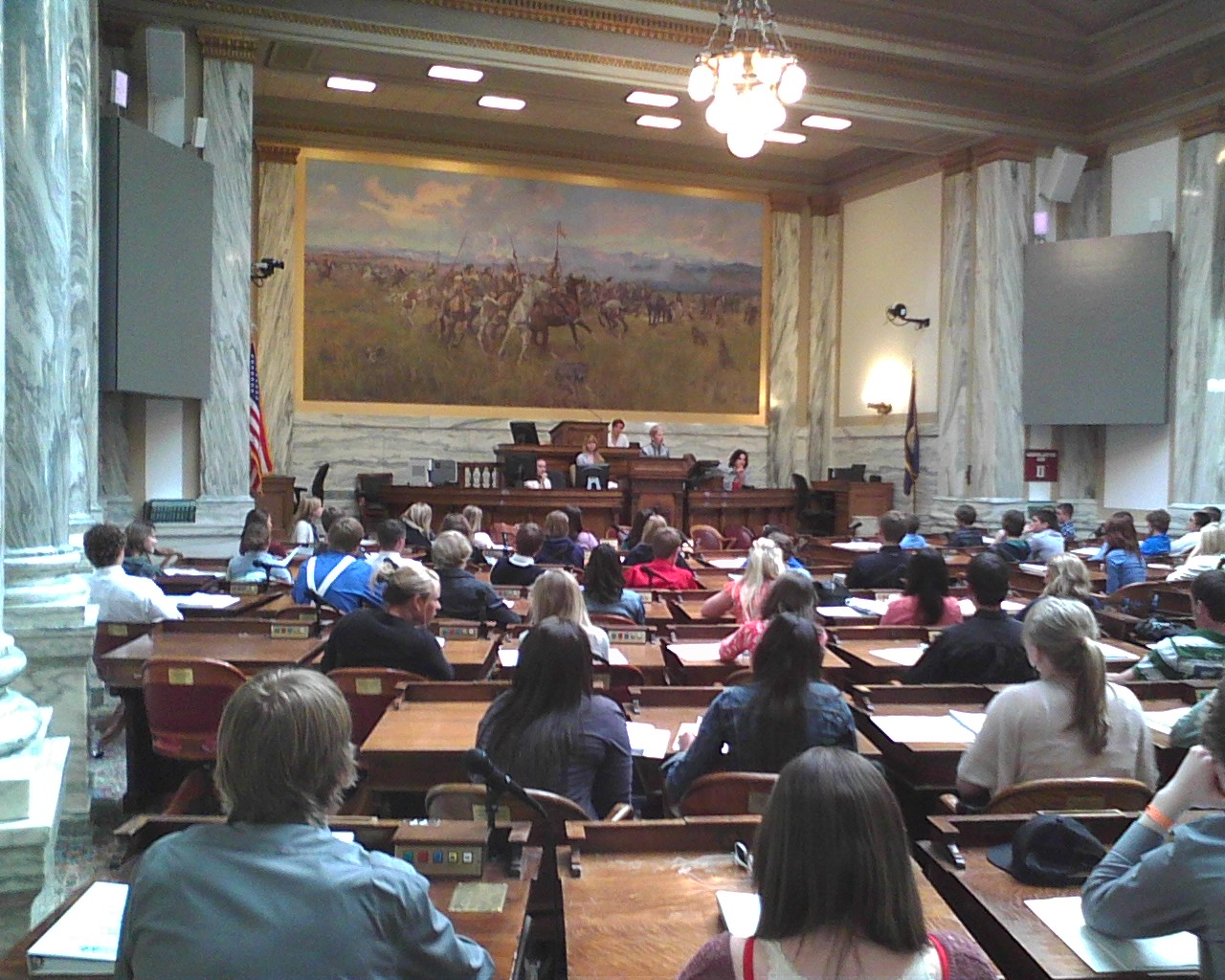
Montana House of Representatives, 2012

Emma Ingalls and Maggie Smith Hathaway were the first women elected to the Montana House of Representatives in 1916, Ingalls as a Republican and Hathaway as a Democrat.

The first woman elected to the Montana State Senate was Ellenore M. Bridenstine, who represented Prairie County from 1945 to 1949.

As of 2021, 49 out of 150 members of the Montana State Legislature were women, including 12 in the state senate and 37 in the state house.

=== State house and senate leadership ===
In the 67th Legislative Session (2021), both the House majority leader and minority leader were women, Republican Sue Vinton as majority leader and Democrat Kim Abbott as minority leader. The first woman in House leadership was in 1979, with Democrat Ann Mary Dussault serving as minority leader. Marian Hanson was the first Republican woman in House leadership, serving from 1993 to 1997 as speaker pro tempore. In 1999, Emily Swanson served as House Minority leader, followed in 2001 by Kim Gillan. In 2007, a second Republican woman served as speaker pro tempore, Debby Barrett. Jenny Eck served as minority leader in 2017. In total since 1889, eight women have served in Montana House leadership. There has never been a female House Speaker.

In the 67th Legislative session (2021), of the four Montana Senate leadership positions, only the Senate minority leader was a woman, Democrat Jill Cohenour. The first woman to serve in Senate leadership was Democrat Carol Williams, who served three legislative sessions in leadership, from 2007 as majority leader and from 2009 to 2011 as minority leader. The first Republican woman in Senate leadership was in 2013, with Debby Barrett serving as president pro tempore. She served again in 2015 as Senate President. In total, there have been three women since 1889 that have served in Senate leadership in any capacity.

== Judicial branch ==
In 2022, three of the seven justices of the Montana Supreme Court justices are women. They are Justice Laurie McKinnon, who has served since 2013; Justice Beth Baker, who has served since 2011; and Justice Ingrid Gustafson, who has served since 2018. Historically, only six of the 105 justices have been women. The first woman to serve on the Court was Diane Barz, who served between 1989 and 1991. Karla Gray, who served 1991 to 2000, was the first chief justice from 2001 to 2008. Patricia Cotter was a justice from 2001 to 2016.
