= 2024 Montana Superintendent of Public Instruction election =

- November 5, 2024
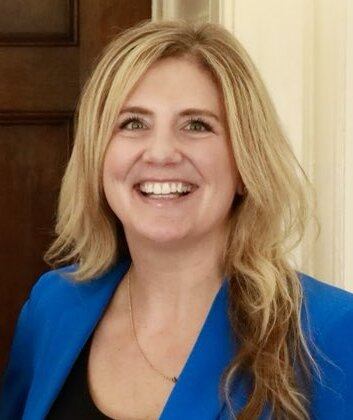

Nominee	Susie Hedalen	Shannon O'Brien
Party	Republican	Democratic
Popular vote	348,360	238,880
Percentage	59.32%	40.68%
- Hedalen: 50–60% 60–70% 70–80% 80–90% >90% O'Brien: 50–60% 60–70%
Superintendent of Public Instruction before election
Elsie Arntzen
Republican
Elected Superintendent of Public Instruction
Susie Hedalen
Republican

The 2024 Montana Superintendent of Public Instruction election was held on November 5, 2024, to elect the superintendent of public instruction of the state of Montana. It coincided with the concurrent presidential election, as well as various state and local elections, including for U.S. Senate, U.S. House, and governor of Montana. Incumbent superintendent of public instruction Elsie Arntzen was term-limited and ran for U.S. House of Representatives. Republican Susie Hedalen defeated Democrat Shannon O'Brien to succeed Arntzen. Primary elections took place on June 4, 2024.

== Republican primary ==
=== Candidates ===
==== Nominee ====
- Susie Hedalen, superintendent of the Townsend School District

==== Eliminated in primary ====
- Sharyl Allen, former superintendent of Conrad Public Schools

=== Results ===
Results by county Hedalen: 50–60%; 60–70%; 70–80%; Allen: 50–60%

Republican primary results
Party	Candidate	Votes	%
Republican	Susie Hedalen	99,717	62.30%
Republican	Sharyl Allen	60,352	37.70%
Total votes		160,069	100.00%

== Democratic primary ==
=== Candidates ===
==== Nominee ====
- Shannon O'Brien, educator

=== Results ===
Democratic primary results
Party	Candidate	Votes	%
Democratic	Shannon O'Brien	94,474	100.00%
Total votes		94,474	100.00%

== General election ==
=== Polling ===
Poll source	Date(s) administered	Sample size (Note: Key: A – all adults RV – registered voters LV – likely voters V – unclear)	Margin of error	Susie Hedalen (R)	Shannon O'Brien (D)	Other	Undecided
Public Opinion Strategies (R) (Note: Poll sponsored by the Montana Republican Party)	September 29 - October 1, 2024	500 (LV)	± 4.34%	43%	36%	2% (Note: "Won't Vote" with 1%; "Refused" with 1%)	18%

=== Results ===
2024 Montana Superintendent of Public Instruction election
Party	Candidate	Votes	%	±%
Republican	Susie Hedalen	348,360	59.32%	+7.13%
Democratic	Shannon O'Brien	238,880	40.68%	−3.06%
Total votes		587,240	100.00%	N/A
Republican hold				

==== By county ====
County	Susie Hedalen Republican		Shannon O'Brien Democratic		Margin		Total
County	Votes	%	Votes	%	Votes	%	Total
Beaverhead	3,995	70.82%	1,646	29.18%	2,349	41.64%	5,641
Big Horn	1,983	44.84%	2,439	55.16%	-456	-10.31%	4,422
Blaine	1,383	46.30%	1,604	53.70%	-221	-7.40%	2,987
Broadwater	3,743	79.59%	960	20.41%	2,783	59.17%	4,703
Carbon	4,830	66.71%	2,410	33.29%	2,420	33.43%	7,240
Carter	733	89.83%	83	10.17%	650	79.66%	816
Cascade	21,884	59.72%	14,761	40.28%	7,123	19.44%	36,645
Chouteau	1,811	63.70%	1,032	36.30%	779	27.40%	2,843
Custer	4,148	73.25%	1,515	26.75%	2,633	46.49%	5,663
Daniels	731	80.07%	182	19.93%	549	60.13%	913
Dawson	3,492	77.76%	999	22.24%	2,493	55.51%	4,491
Deer Lodge	2,090	44.01%	2,659	55.99%	-569	-11.98%	4,749
Fallon	1,253	87.50%	179	12.50%	1,074	75.00%	1,432
Fergus	4,884	74.63%	1,660	25.37%	3,224	49.27%	6,544
Flathead	41,377	67.20%	20,200	32.80%	21,177	34.39%	61,577
Gallatin	32,912	48.93%	34,355	51.07%	-1,443	-2.15%	67,267
Garfield	725	93.79%	48	6.21%	677	87.58%	773
Glacier	1,765	35.12%	3,261	64.88%	-1,496	-29.77%	5,026
Golden Valley	435	84.14%	82	15.86%	353	68.28%	517
Granite	1,502	71.29%	605	28.71%	897	42.57%	2,107
Hill	3,672	55.75%	2,914	44.25%	758	11.51%	6,586
Jefferson	5,561	68.27%	2,585	31.73%	2,976	36.53%	8,146
Judith Basin	1,029	77.19%	304	22.81%	725	54.39%	1,333
Lake	9,803	59.36%	6,711	40.64%	3,092	18.72%	16,514
Lewis and Clark	21,448	52.06%	19,749	47.94%	1,699	4.12%	41,197
Liberty	713	74.43%	245	25.57%	468	48.85%	958
Lincoln	8,811	76.66%	2,682	23.34%	6,129	53.33%	11,493
Madison	4,526	72.89%	1,683	27.11%	2,843	45.79%	6,209
McCone	902	86.40%	142	13.60%	760	72.80%	1,044
Meagher	893	77.72%	256	22.28%	637	55.44%	1,149
Mineral	2,026	76.74%	614	23.26%	1,412	53.48%	2,640
Missoula	27,421	38.65%	43,528	61.35%	-16,107	-22.70%	70,949
Musselshell	2,546	86.39%	401	13.61%	2,145	72.79%	2,947
Park	6,205	54.16%	5,251	45.84%	954	8.33%	11,456
Petroleum	282	86.77%	43	13.23%	239	73.54%	325
Phillips	1,705	79.90%	429	20.10%	1,276	59.79%	2,134
Pondera	1,899	68.83%	860	31.17%	1,039	37.66%	2,759
Powder River	921	85.99%	150	14.01%	771	71.99%	1,071
Powell	2,408	75.23%	793	24.77%	1,615	50.45%	3,201
Prairie	542	80.06%	135	19.94%	407	60.12%	677
Ravalli	20,449	70.55%	8,535	29.45%	11,914	41.11%	28,984
Richland	4,192	82.68%	878	17.32%	3,314	65.36%	5,070
Roosevelt	1,810	47.64%	1,989	52.36%	-179	-4.71%	3,799
Rosebud	2,426	66.98%	1,196	33.02%	1,230	33.96%	3,622
Sanders	6,068	77.45%	1,767	22.55%	4,301	54.89%	7,835
Sheridan	1,230	69.53%	539	30.47%	691	39.06%	1,769
Silver Bow	7,294	41.29%	10,373	58.71%	-3,079	-17.43%	17,667
Stillwater	4,702	80.62%	1,130	19.38%	3,572	61.25%	5,832
Sweet Grass	1,798	76.90%	540	23.10%	1,258	53.81%	2,338
Teton	2,444	70.55%	1,020	29.45%	1,424	41.11%	3,464
Toole	1,520	76.38%	470	23.62%	1,050	52.76%	1,990
Treasure	366	84.14%	69	15.86%	297	68.28%	435
Valley	2,887	72.98%	1,069	27.02%	1,818	45.96%	3,956
Wheatland	853	80.70%	204	19.30%	649	61.40%	1,057
Wibaux	426	82.24%	92	17.76%	334	64.48%	518
Yellowstone	50,906	63.82%	28,854	36.18%	22,052	27.65%	79,760
Totals	348,360	59.32%	238,880	40.68%	109,480	18.64%	587,240

==== Counties that flipped from Democratic to Republican ====
- Hill (largest city: Havre)
- Lewis and Clark (largest city: Helena)

==== By congressional district ====
Hedalen won both congressional districts.

District	Hedalen	O'Brien	Representative
1st	55%	45%	Ryan Zinke
2nd	64%	36%	Matt Rosendale (118th Congress)
2nd	64%	36%	Troy Downing (119th Congress)

== Notes ==
Partisan clients
