= 2020 Montana Superintendent of Public Instruction election =

- November 3, 2020
Nominee	Elsie Arntzen	Melissa Romano
Party	Republican	Democratic
Popular vote	310,111	259,886
Percentage	52.19%	43.74%
- Arntzen: 40–50% 50–60% 60–70% 70–80% 80–90% Romano: 40–50% 50–60% 60–70%
Superintendent of Public Instruction before election
Elsie Arntzen
Republican
Elected Superintendent of Public Instruction
Elsie Arntzen
Republican

The 2020 Montana Superintendent of Public Instruction election was held on November 3, 2020, to elect the superintendent of public instruction of the state of Montana. It coincided with the concurrent presidential election, as well as various state and local elections, including for U.S. Senate, U.S. House, and governor of Montana. Incumbent Republican superintendent of public instruction Elsie Arntzen was re-elected to a second term in office, defeating Democratic challenger Melissa Romano. Primary elections took place on June 2.

== Republican primary ==
=== Candidates ===
==== Nominee ====
- Elsie Arntzen, incumbent state superintendent

=== Results ===
Republican primary results
Party	Candidate	Votes	%
Republican	Elsie Arntzen (incumbent)	178,156	99.98%
Write-in		32	0.02%
Total votes		178,188	100.00%

== Democratic primary ==
=== Candidates ===
==== Nominee ====
- Melissa Romano, nominee for Superintendent of Public Instruction in 2016

=== Results ===
Democratic primary results
Party	Candidate	Votes	%
Democratic	Melissa Romano	132,792	100.00%
Write-in		3	0.00%
Total votes		132,795	100.00%

== General election ==
=== Polling ===
Poll source	Date(s) administered	Sample size (Note: Key: A – all adults RV – registered voters LV – likely voters V – unclear)	Margin of error	Elsie Arntzen (R)	Melissa Romano (D)	Other / Undecided
Strategies 360/NBCMT	October 15–20, 2020	500 (LV)	± 4.4%	39%	41%	21% (Note: Leatherbarrow (L) with 5%; Undecided with 16%)

=== Results ===
2020 Montana Superintendent of Public Instruction election
Party	Candidate	Votes	%
Republican	Elsie Arntzen (incumbent)	310,111	52.19%
Democratic	Melissa Romano	259,886	43.74%
Libertarian	Kevin Leatherbarrow	24,202	4.07%
Total votes		594,199	100.00%
Republican hold			

==== By county ====
County	Elsie Arntzen Republican		Melissa Romano Democratic		Kevin Leatherbarrow Libertarian		Margin		Total
County	Votes	%	Votes	%	Votes	%	Votes	%	Total
Beaverhead	3,609	64.64%	1,766	31.63%	208	3.73%	1,843	33.01%	5,583
Big Horn	1,878	39.44%	2,721	57.14%	163	3.42%	-843	-17.70%	4,762
Blaine	1,258	40.52%	1,764	56.81%	83	2.67%	-506	-16.30%	3,105
Broadwater	2,894	71.74%	994	24.64%	146	3.62%	1,900	47.10%	4,034
Carbon	4,196	59.88%	2,539	36.24%	272	3.88%	1,657	23.65%	7,007
Carter	725	85.90%	100	11.85%	19	2.25%	625	74.05%	844
Cascade	19,908	50.52%	17,839	45.27%	1,656	4.20%	2,069	5.25%	39,403
Chouteau	1,632	55.64%	1,187	40.47%	114	3.89%	445	15.17%	2,933
Custer	3,789	65.44%	1,770	30.57%	231	3.99%	2,019	34.87%	5,790
Daniels	713	72.61%	237	24.13%	32	3.26%	476	48.47%	982
Dawson	3,382	71.02%	1,226	25.75%	154	3.23%	2,156	45.28%	4,762
Deer Lodge	1,778	36.75%	2,837	58.64%	223	4.61%	-1,059	-21.89%	4,838
Fallon	1,234	82.27%	224	14.93%	42	2.80%	1,010	67.33%	1,500
Fergus	4,496	69.97%	1,754	27.30%	176	2.74%	2,742	42.67%	6,426
Flathead	35,707	60.70%	20,787	35.34%	2,332	3.96%	14,920	25.36%	58,826
Gallatin	29,668	43.08%	35,598	51.69%	3,596	5.22%	-5,930	-8.61%	68,862
Garfield	702	88.75%	65	8.22%	24	3.03%	637	80.53%	791
Glacier	1,583	27.96%	3,875	68.45%	203	3.59%	-2,292	-40.49%	5,661
Golden Valley	394	78.80%	92	18.40%	14	2.80%	302	60.40%	500
Granite	1,258	60.83%	717	34.67%	93	4.50%	541	26.16%	2,068
Hill	3,352	47.05%	3,414	47.92%	359	5.04%	-62	-0.87%	7,125
Jefferson	4,779	59.31%	2,995	37.17%	284	3.52%	1,784	22.14%	8,058
Judith Basin	953	71.76%	341	25.68%	34	2.56%	612	46.08%	1,328
Lake	8,500	51.84%	7,258	44.26%	639	3.90%	1,242	7.57%	16,397
Lewis and Clark	18,684	44.65%	21,414	51.17%	1,748	4.18%	-2,730	-6.52%	41,846
Liberty	694	65.16%	333	31.27%	38	3.57%	361	33.90%	1,065
Lincoln	8,117	70.38%	2,958	25.65%	458	3.97%	5,159	44.73%	11,533
Madison	3,884	65.15%	1,869	31.35%	209	3.51%	2,015	33.80%	5,962
McCone	890	80.32%	178	16.06%	40	3.61%	712	64.26%	1,108
Meagher	772	70.44%	282	25.73%	42	3.83%	490	44.71%	1,096
Mineral	1,636	64.89%	755	29.95%	130	5.16%	881	34.95%	2,521
Missoula	23,950	34.11%	43,453	61.88%	2,813	4.01%	-19,503	-27.78%	70,216
Musselshell	2,200	77.44%	524	18.44%	117	4.12%	1,676	58.99%	2,841
Park	5,484	48.20%	5,408	47.53%	486	4.27%	76	0.67%	11,378
Petroleum	279	81.10%	54	15.70%	11	3.20%	225	65.41%	344
Phillips	1,783	76.16%	491	20.97%	67	2.86%	1,292	55.19%	2,341
Pondera	1,735	58.42%	1,124	37.85%	111	3.74%	611	20.57%	2,970
Powder River	885	80.38%	179	16.26%	37	3.36%	706	64.12%	1,101
Powell	2,060	65.56%	964	30.68%	118	3.76%	1,096	34.88%	3,142
Prairie	543	75.52%	147	20.45%	29	4.03%	396	55.08%	719
Ravalli	17,968	63.95%	9,151	32.57%	977	3.48%	8,817	31.38%	28,096
Richland	4,382	77.39%	1,057	18.67%	223	3.94%	3,325	58.72%	5,662
Roosevelt	1,738	43.84%	2,052	51.77%	174	4.39%	-314	-7.92%	3,964
Rosebud	2,204	59.14%	1,392	37.35%	131	3.51%	812	21.79%	3,727
Sanders	5,148	68.76%	2,025	27.05%	314	4.19%	3,123	41.71%	7,487
Sheridan	1,259	64.30%	621	31.72%	78	3.98%	638	32.58%	1,958
Silver Bow	6,354	34.42%	11,356	61.52%	749	4.06%	-5,002	-27.10%	18,459
Stillwater	4,062	71.53%	1,429	25.16%	188	3.31%	2,633	46.36%	5,679
Sweet Grass	1,700	70.16%	629	25.96%	94	3.88%	1,071	44.20%	2,423
Teton	2,243	61.33%	1,285	35.14%	129	3.53%	958	26.20%	3,657
Toole	1,419	68.16%	574	27.57%	89	4.27%	845	40.59%	2,082
Treasure	350	76.42%	101	22.05%	7	1.53%	249	54.37%	458
Valley	2,664	63.93%	1,344	32.25%	159	3.82%	1,320	31.68%	4,167
Wheatland	749	71.67%	261	24.98%	35	3.35%	488	46.70%	1,045
Wibaux	431	74.70%	124	21.49%	22	3.81%	307	53.21%	577
Yellowstone	45,456	54.77%	34,252	41.27%	3,282	3.95%	11,204	13.50%	82,990
Totals	310,111	52.19%	259,886	43.74%	24,202	4.07%	50,225	8.45%	594,199

==== Counties that flipped from Democratic to Republican ====
- Cascade (largest city: Great Falls)
