= 2016 United States House of Representatives election in Montana =

- November 8, 2016
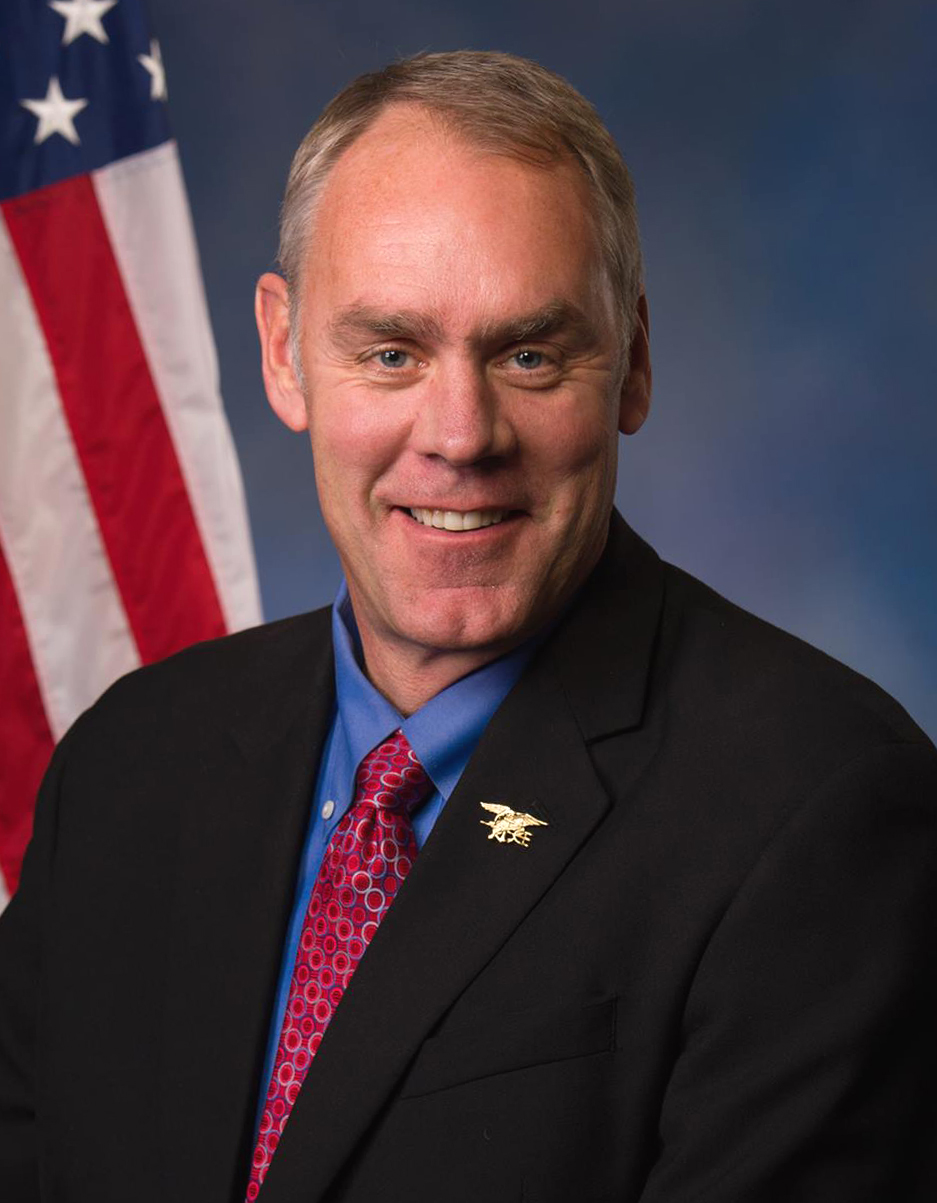

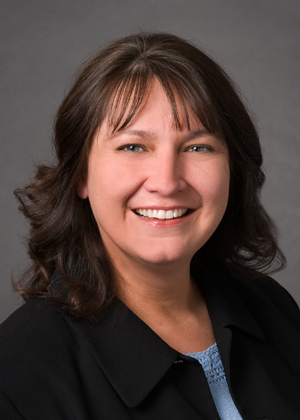
Nominee	Ryan Zinke	Denise Juneau
Party	Republican	Democratic
Popular vote	285,358	205,919
Percentage	56.19%	40.55%
- Zinke: 40–50% 50–60% 60–70% 70–80% 80–90% >90% Juneau: 40–50% 50–60% 60–70% 70–80% 80–90% >90% Tie: 40–50% No votes
U.S. Representative before election
Ryan Zinke
Republican
Elected U.S. Representative
Ryan Zinke
Republican

The 2016 United States House of Representatives election in Montana was held on November 8, 2016, to elect the U.S. representative from Montana's at-large congressional district. The election coincided with the 2016 U.S. presidential election, as well as other elections to the House of Representatives, elections to the United States Senate and various state and local elections.

At the time, Montana's congressional district had a PVI of R+7. Republican Ryan Zinke, who was first elected in 2014, is the incumbent. Zinke was re-elected in 2016. He faced no primary opposition. Denise Juneau, who at the time of the election was the Montana State Superintendent of Public Instruction, was the lone Democrat to file for election. The primaries were held on June 7.

== Republican primary ==
=== Candidates ===
- Ryan Zinke, incumbent

=== Results ===
Republican primary results
Party	Candidate	Votes	%
Republican	Ryan Zinke (incumbent)	144,660	100.0
Total votes		144,660	100.0

== Democratic primary ==
=== Candidates ===
- Denise Juneau, State Superintendent of Public Instruction

=== Results ===
Democratic primary results
Party	Candidate	Votes	%
Democratic	Denise Juneau	112,821	100.0
Total votes		112,821	100.0

== General election ==
=== Predictions ===
Source	Ranking	As of
The Cook Political Report	Likely R	November 7, 2016
Daily Kos Elections	Likely R	November 7, 2016
Rothenberg	Likely R	November 3, 2016
Sabato's Crystal Ball	Likely R	November 7, 2016
RCP	Likely R	October 31, 2016

=== Polling ===
Poll source	Date(s) administered	Sample size	Margin of error	Ryan Zinke (R)	Denise Juneau (D)	Other	Undecided
Mason-Dixon	October 10–12, 2016	1,003	± 3.2%	53%	40%	1%	6%
Montana State University Billings	October 3–10, 2016	590	± 4.0%	50%	31%	—	19%

=== Results ===
Montana's at-large congressional district, 2016
Party	Candidate	Votes	%	±%
Republican	Ryan Zinke (incumbent)	285,358	56.19%	+0.78%
Democratic	Denise Juneau	205,919	40.55%	+0.14%
Libertarian	Rick Breckenridge	16,554	3.26%	−0.92%
Total votes		507,831	100.0%	N/A
Republican hold				

==== Counties that flipped from Republican to Democratic ====
- Gallatin (largest city: Bozeman)
