= Senator Lake =

Senator Lake may refer to:

- Bob Lake (born 1938), Montana State Senate
- I. Beverly Lake Jr. (1934–2019), North Carolina State Senate
- Wells Lake (politician) (1773–?), New York State Senate
