= Senator Fielder =

Senator Fielder may refer to:

- James Fairman Fielder (1867–1954), New Jersey State Senate
- Jennifer Fielder (fl. 2010s), Montana State Senate
