= Senator Moe =

Senator Moe may refer to:

- Donald Moe (1942–2017), Minnesota State Senate
- Mary Sheehy Moe (fl. 2010s), Montana State Senate
- Roger Moe (born 1944), Minnesota State Senate
