= Senator Tropila =

Senator Tropila may refer to:

- Joseph Tropila (born 1935), Montana State Senate
- Mitch Tropila (fl. 2000s–2010s), Montana State Senate
