= Susie Hedalen =

American educator and politician

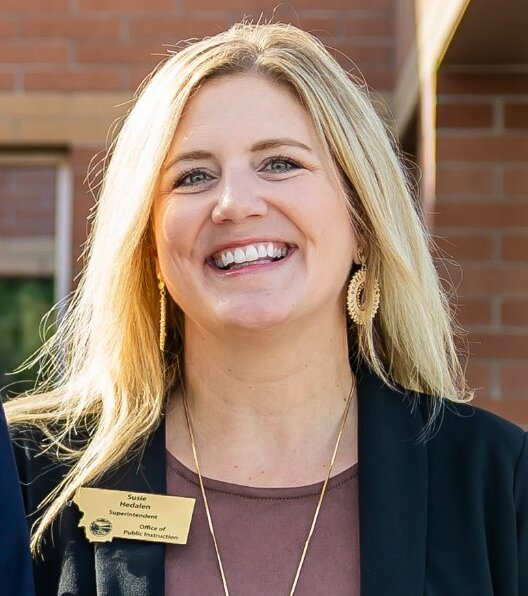
- Hedalen in 2025

18th Montana Superintendent of Public Instruction
- Incumbent
- Assumed office January 6, 2025
- Governor: Greg Gianforte
- Preceded by: Elsie Arntzen

Personal details
- Born: February 21, 1984 (age 42) Helena, Montana, U.S.
- Party: Republican
- Spouse: Derrick Hedalen
- Education: Montana State University (BEd, MEd)

Susie Hedalen (born February 21, 1984) is an American educator and politician serving as the 18th Montana superintendent of public instruction since 2025. She is a member of the Republican Party.

== Early life and career ==
Hedalen was born in 1984 in Helena, Montana. She graduated from Helena High School, and went on to earn her bachelor of education and master of education from Montana State University.

Hedalen served as the deputy superintendent of the Montana Office of Public Instruction from July 2018 to November 2019. She served as Superintendent of the Townsend School District from 2021 to 2024. She also served as the vice chair of the Montana Board of Public Education from 2021 to 2023, appointed by the Governor of Montana.

== Montana Superintendent of Public Instruction (2025–present) ==
On November 5, 2024, Hedalen was elected the 18th Montana superintendent of public instruction, defeating Democratic candidate Shannon O'Brien. During the campaign, she received endorsements from Governor Greg Gianforte, Senator Steve Daines, Attorney General Austin Knudsen, and Congressman Ryan Zinke. On January 6, 2025, Hedalen was sworn into office by Chief Justice Cory Swanson, succeeding Superintendent Elsie Arntzen. She entered office amid a major budget deficit.

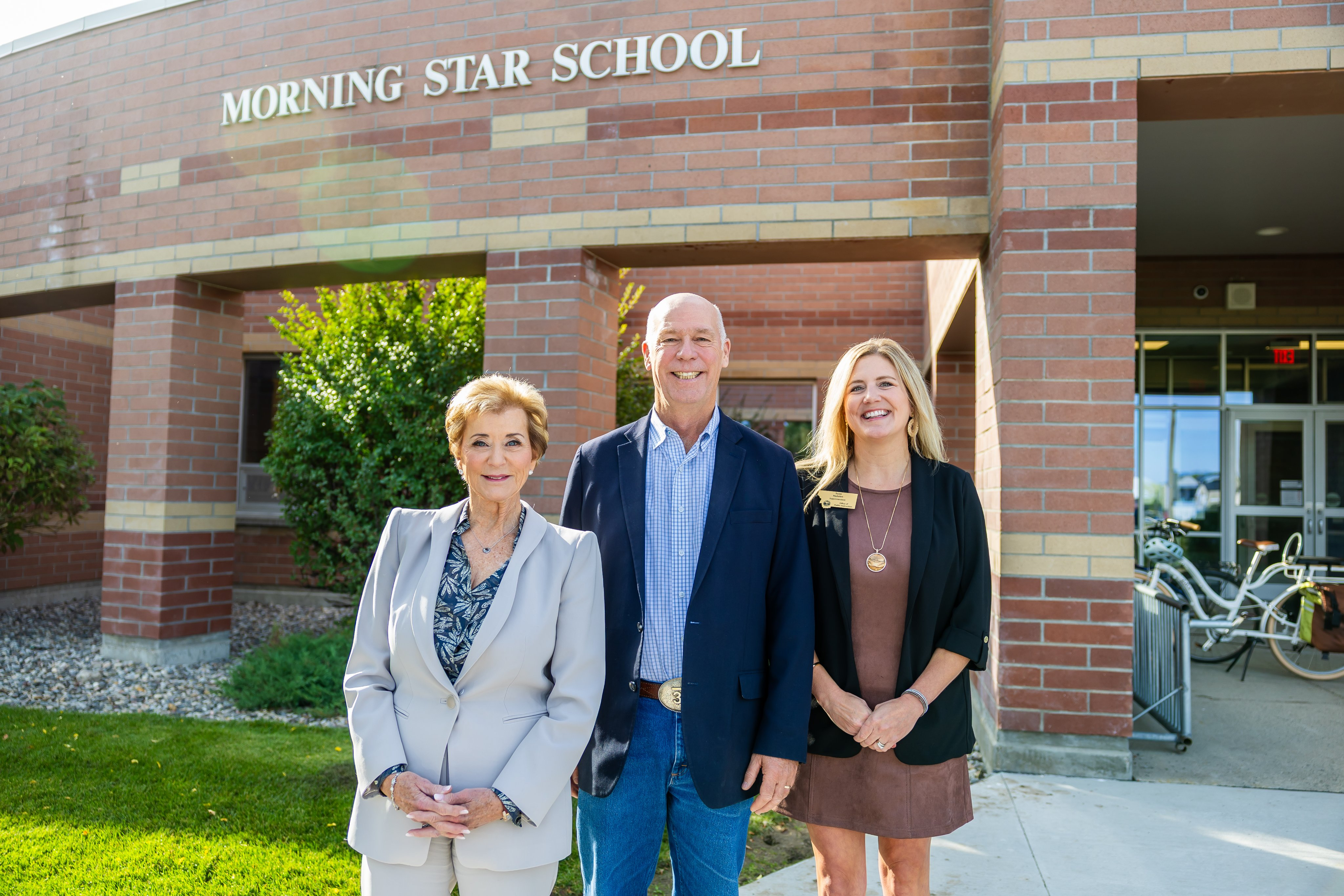
Hedalen with Secretary Linda McMahon and Governor Greg Gianforte at Morning Star School in Bozeman, Montana, September 2025

In March 2025, Hedalen attended a ceremony at the White House for President Donald Trump to sign an executive order on education. During the trip, she met with Secretary of Education Linda McMahon.

== Personal life ==
Hedalen is married to Derrick Hedalen. They live in Townsend, Montana.

=== DUI charges ===
In June 2025, Hedalen was arrested and charged with driving under the influence in Belgrade, Montana. Hedalen released a statement to the press, saying: "I apologize and take full responsibility for my lapse in judgment."

== Electoral history ==
2024 Montana Superintendent of Public Instruction election
Party	Candidate	Votes	%
Republican	Susie Hedalen	348,360	59.3
Democratic	Shannon O'Brien	238,880	40.7
Total votes		587,240	100

== See also ==
- Denise Juneau
- Linda McCulloch
- Nancy Keenan

Political offices
Preceded by Elsie Arntzen	Montana Superintendent of Public Instruction; 2025–present	Succeeded by Incumbent
