= Bob Lake =

American politician

Member of the Montana Public Service Commission for the 4th district
- In office 2012 - January 2, 2021
- Preceded by: Gail Gutsche
- Succeeded by: Jennifer Fielder

Personal details
- Born: 18 March 1938 (age 88) Ronan, Montana
- Party: Republican
- Spouse: Faithe
- Occupation: business owner

Bob Lake is a Republican former member of the Montana Legislature. He was elected for Senate District 44, representing the Hamilton, Montana area, in 2010. He previously served in the Montana House of Representatives from 2003-2011.

In 2012 he was elected to the Montana Public Service Commission, representing District 4. He won reelection in 2016 over Gail Gutsche. He could not run in 2020 due to term-limits and left public office in 2021.
