= Randy Pinocci =

Commissioner on the Montana Public Service Commission
- Incumbent
- Assumed office 2019
- Preceded by: Travis Kavulla
- Constituency: District 1

Member of the Montana House of Representatives
- In office 2015–2017
- Preceded by: Roger Hagen
- Succeeded by: Wendy McKamey
- Constituency: 19th District

Personal details
- Born: September 27, 1964 (age 62) Deer Lodge, MT
- Party: Republican
- Children: 3
- Education: California State University, Los Angeles

Randall Scott Pinocci (born September 27, 1964) is an American businessman and politician from Montana. He currently serves on the Montana Public Service Commission as a commissioner from District 1, and previously sat in the Montana House of Representatives as a Republican from 2015 to 2017.

== Political career ==
Pinocci was elected in 2014 to represent the 19th district of the Montana House of Representatives. He lost to fellow republican incumbent Wendy McKamey in the 2016 primary election. During his tenure, Pinocci sponsored several bills, including a bill requiring applicants for the Temporary Assistance for Needy Families program to go through and pass mandatory drug screenings, and a bill which regulated how out-of-state persons could participate in the sale of real estate.

In 2018, Pinocci was elected to represent district 1 of the Montana Public Service Commission. He ran unopposed in the 2022 election.

=== Legal disputes ===
Pinocci has been involved in several legal disputes throughout his public career. During his 2012 MT House campaign, Pinocci failed to file campaign financial reports. In July 2023, Pinocci was cited for misdemeanor disorderly conduct following an argument between a tenant's brother and himself. In September 2023, he was subsequently arrested for failure to appear in court. In October 2023, Pinocci was arrested for a second time and charged with two counts of felony witness tampering, after telling two witnesses of the initial July incident to recant their statements if they wanted to continue a business relationship. In 2024, Pinocci agreed to a plea deal of no contest to the disorderly conduct charges, and conceded that probable cause had existed for the state to charge him with the felonies. As a part prosecutors dropped the witness tampering charges, and Pinocci was required to pay a $100 fine as well as administrative fees.
