= Carlie Boland =

American politician

Member of the Montana Senate from the 12th district
- In office February 6, 2017 – January 2, 2023
- Preceded by: Mary Sheehy Moe
- Succeeded by: Wendy McKamey

Member of the Montana House of Representatives from the 23rd district
- In office January 5, 2009 – January 5, 2015
- Preceded by: John Parker
- Succeeded by: Wendy McKamey

Personal details
- Party: Democratic

Cydnie "Carlie" Boland is an American politician of the Democratic member of the Montana Legislature from 2017 to 2023. She was appointed to replace State Senator Mary Sheehy Moe of District 12 which represents the Great Falls area in 2017, who resigned due to family obligations. She was elected to a full term in 2018. Prior to serving in the State Senate, Boland served as the Representative for House District 23. She has served in the 2009 and 2011 legislative sessions.
