= Wendy McKamey =

American politician (born 1946)

Member of the Montana Senate from the 12th district
- Incumbent
- Assumed office January 2, 2023
- Preceded by: Carlie Boland

Member of the Montana House of Representatives
- In office January 2, 2017 – January 2, 2023
- Preceded by: Randy Pinocci
- Succeeded by: Russ Miner
- Constituency: 19th district
- In office January 5, 2015 – January 2, 2017
- Preceded by: Carlie Boland
- Succeeded by: Bradley Maxon Hamlett
- Constituency: 23rd district

Personal details
- Born: December 15, 1946 (age 79) Ogden, Utah
- Party: Republican
- Spouse: Les McKamey
- Children: 7
- Education: Brigham Young University (BS)
- Occupation: Rancher, musician

Wendy McKamey (born December 15, 1946) is an American politician from Montana. She has served as a Republican member of the Montana Senate since 2023, and previously sat in the Montana House of Representatives from 2015 to 2023.

== Political career ==
McKamey was first elected in 2014, in a race decided by just 16 votes, to represent District 23 in the Montana House of Representatives. In 2016, she was elected to represent District 19; she was re-elected to that position in 2018, and is running again in 2020.

In 2020, McKamey sat on the following committees: State Administration (Vice Chair), Agriculture, and Education.

In 2021, McKamey proposed legislation to restrict voting rights in Montana. The legislation prohibited ballot collection, which at the time was common in communities where election infrastructure was limited, such as the Native American community in Montana, which is a Democratic-leaning constituency. The legislation was passed by the Republican-controlled State Legislature. The legislation came amid a nationwide push by Republicans to restrict voting rights after Donald Trump lost the 2020 election and refused to concede while he and other Republicans made false claims of fraud. McKamey defended the voting restrictions, saying "There are going to be habits that are going to have to change because we need to keep our security at the utmost"; there was no evidence of significant voter fraud in Montana.

In 2022, McKamey was elected to the Montana Senate, defeating Democrat Jacob Bachmeier.

McKamey was a part of a moderate coalition of 9 Republicans formed with Democrats in the 69th Montana Legislature, dubbed the "nasty nine" by opponents and was censured on March 27 for her efforts.

=== Electoral record ===
2012 general election: Montana House of Representatives, District 10
Party	Candidate	Votes	%
Democratic	Brad Hamlett	4,078	51.1%
Republican	Wendy McKamey	3,907	48.9%

2014 general election: Montana House of Representatives, District 23
Party	Candidate	Votes	%
Republican	Wendy McKamey	1,275	50.3%
Democratic	Earl Salley	1,259	49.7%

2016 Republican primary: Montana House of Representatives, District 19
Party	Candidate	Votes	%
Republican	Wendy McKamey	1,230	61.62%
Republican	Randy Pinocci	766	38.38%

2016 general election: Montana House of Representatives, District 19
Party	Candidate	Votes	%
Republican	Wendy McKamey	3,328	72.81%
Democratic	Elaine Olsen	1,243	27.19%

2018 Republican primary: Montana House of Representatives, District 19
Party	Candidate	Votes	%
Republican	Wendy McKamey	1,149	68.4%
Republican	Steve Moltzan	532	31.6%

2018 general election: Montana House of Representatives, District 19
Party	Candidate	Votes	%
Republican	Wendy McKamey	3,212	72.0%
Democratic	Lynelle Melton	1,250	28.0%
