= Carol Juneau =

American politician

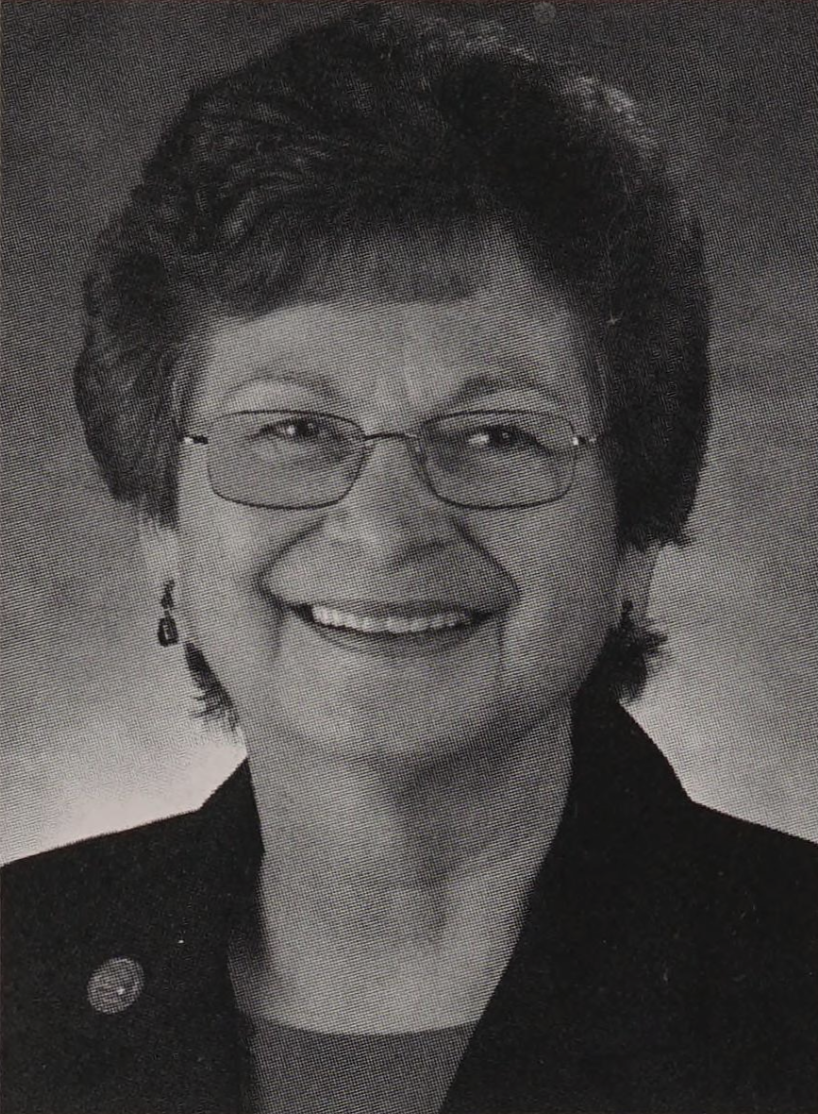
- Juneau in 2009

Member of the Montana Senate from the 8th district
- In office January 3, 2007 – January 3, 2011
- Succeeded by: Shannon Augare

Member of the Montana House of Representatives
- In office 1998–2007

Personal details
- Born: May 5, 1945 (age 81) White Shield, North Dakota, U.S.
- Party: Democratic
- Spouse: Stan
- Children: 2, including Denise
- Education: Eastern Montana College (BA); University of Montana (MEd)

Carol C. Juneau (born May 5, 1945) is an American politician and educator who served as a member of both branches of the Montana Legislature from 1998 to 2011.

== Early life and education ==
Juneau was born in White Shield, North Dakota. She earned a Bachelor of Arts degree from Eastern Montana College and a Master of Education from the University of Montana.

== Career ==
Juneau was the director of the Blackfeet Community Free School from 1974 to 1976 and president of the Blackfeet Community College from 1976 to 1983. She has also worked as an education consultant and member of the Montana Indian Democrats Council. She was the vice chair of the Glacier County, Montana Democratic Central Committee.

In 1998, Juneau became a member of Montana House of Representatives, serving until 2005.

In 2006, Juneau became a member of Montana Senate.

== Personal life ==
Juneau and her husband, Stan, have two children. Juneau and her family live in Browning, Montana. One of Juneau's daughter is Denise Juneau, the former Montana superintendent of public instruction.
