= Brad Johnson (Montana politician) =

American politician (born 1951)

Member of the Montana Public Service Commission for the 5th district
- In office January 3, 2015 – January 2, 2023
- Preceded by: Bill Gallagher
- Succeeded by: Ann Bukacek

19th Secretary of State of Montana
- In office January 3, 2005 – January 3, 2009
- Governor: Brian Schweitzer
- Preceded by: Bob Brown
- Succeeded by: Linda McCulloch

Personal details
- Born: March 6, 1951 (age 75) Lake Forest, Illinois, U.S.
- Party: Republican
- Spouse: Lisa
- Education: University of Illinois Urbana-Champaign

Brad Johnson (born March 6, 1951) is an American politician from the U.S. state of Montana. A member of the Republican Party, he served as chairman of the Montana Public Service Commission where he left office in January 2023. Johnson was a candidate in the Republican primary in the 2024 United States Senate election in Montana.

== Biography ==
Johnson was born in Lake Forest, Illinois. He received a bachelor of agriculture from the University of Illinois Urbana-Champaign (Class of 1976) before moving to Montana in 1980. He owned an auto parts store and worked for RightNow Technologies in Bozeman. He also served as a district representative for Congressman Ron Marlenee and worked as an agricultural extension agent.

Johnson unsuccessfully challenged Democratic Congressman Pat Williams in 1990 and ran for the Republican nomination for United States Senate in 2002 before he was elected Secretary of State of Montana in 2004, defeating Yellowstone County Commissioner Bill Kennedy. He lost reelection to state Superintendent of Public Instruction Linda McCulloch in 2008.

Johnson withdrew from the race for Public Service Commissioner in 2010 after pleading guilty to driving under the influence in Broadwater County. He subsequently entered an alcohol treatment program. He ran for Secretary of State in 2012, but again lost to McCulloch.

Johnson was elected Public Service Commissioner for District 5 in 2014, defeating Democrat Galen Hollenbaugh, and was chosen to be chairman of the commission by his colleagues. He announced his candidacy for Governor of Montana in the 2016 election, but withdrew from the race in January citing fundraising concerns and commitment to his duties on the Public Service Commission.

== Electoral history ==
U.S. Congress for Montana's 1st district, 1990
Party	Candidate	Votes	%
Democratic	Pat Williams (inc.)	100,409	61.13
Republican	Brad Johnson	63,837	38.87

U.S. Senate Republican Primary election in Montana, 2002
Party	Candidate	Votes	%
Republican	Mike Taylor	48,169	60.16
Republican	Brad Johnson	14,252	17.80
Republican	John McDonald	10,116	12.63
Republican	Melvin Hanson	7,536	9.41

Montana Secretary of State Republican Primary Election, 2004
Party	Candidate	Votes	%
Republican	Brad Johnson	39,479	56.61
Republican	Todd O'Hair	15,130	21.70
Republican	Bob Werner	15,130	21.70

Montana Secretary of State Election, 2004
Party	Candidate	Votes	%
Republican	Brad Johnson	219,821	51.03
Democratic	Bill Kennedy	210,972	48.97

Montana Secretary of State Republican Primary Election, 2008
Party	Candidate	Votes	%
Republican	Brad Johnson (inc.)	81,661	100.00

Montana Secretary of State Election, 2008
Party	Candidate	Votes	%
Democratic	Linda McCulloch	233,717	49.32
Republican	Brad Johnson (inc.)	228,412	48.20
Constitution	Sieglinde Sharbono	11,722	2.47

Montana Secretary of State Republican Primary Election, 2012
Party	Candidate	Votes	%
Republican	Brad Johnson	65,445	55.05
Republican	Scott Aspenlieder	26,974	22.69
Republican	Patty L. Lovaas	18,479	15.54
Republican	Drew Turiano	7,985	6.72

Montana Secretary of State Election, 2012
Party	Candidate	Votes	%
Democratic	Linda McCulloch (inc.)	245,024	51.41
Republican	Brad Johnson	214,976	45.10
Libertarian	Roger Roots	16,622	3.49

Public Service Commissioner for Montana's 5th district, 2014
Party	Candidate	Votes	%
Republican	Brad Johnson	44,352	61.11
Democratic	Galen Hollenbaugh	28,229	38.89

Public Service Commissioner for Montana's 5th district, 2018
Party	Candidate	Votes	%
Republican	Brad Johnson	60,434	57.81
Democratic	Andy Shirtliff	44,103	42.19

Montana Secretary of State Republican Primary Election, 2020
Party	Candidate	Votes	%
Republican	Christi Jacobsen	57,941	29.42
Republican	Scott Sales	49,759	25.27
Republican	Brad Johnson	45,526	23.12
Republican	Forrest J. Mandeville	20,318	10.32
Republican	Bowen Greenwood	14,080	7.15
Republican	Kurt Johnson	9,316	4.73

Montana United States Senate Republican Primary Election, 2024
Party	Candidate	Votes	%
Republican	Tim Sheehy	139,857	73.60
Republican	Brad Johnson	36,926	19.43
Republican	Charles Walkingchild, Sr.	13,229	6.96

Political offices
Preceded by Bob Brown	Secretary of State of Montana; 2005–2009	Succeeded by Linda McCulloch
Preceded by Bill Gallagher	Member of the Montana Public Service Commission for the 5th district 2015–2023	Succeeded by Ann Bukacek
