= Mary Sheehy Moe =

American politician from Montana

Member of the Montana Senate from the 12th district
- In office January 3, 2015 – January 27, 2017
- Preceded by: Mitch Tropila
- Succeeded by: Carlie Boland

Personal details
- Party: Democratic

Mary Sheehy Moe is a Democratic member of the Montana Legislature. A former schoolteacher, she was first elected to Senate District 12 on November 4, 2014, with 53.7% of the vote. Moe was sworn in on January 3, 2015, and represents part of Great Falls, Montana. She resigned her seat in January 2017 to spend more time with her daughter, who had recently given birth to triplets. She was replaced by Democrat Carlie Boland.

== Awards ==
- 2018 MEA-MFT Hall of Fame inductee.

Montana Senate
Preceded by Mitch Tropila	Member of the Montana Senate from the 12th district 2015–2017	Succeeded by Carlie Boland
