= John Parker (Montana politician) =

American politician

Member of the Montana House of Representatives from the 23rd district
- In office 2002 - 2008
- Succeeded by: Carlie Boland

Personal details
- Born: December 29, 1970 (age 55) Great Falls, Montana
- Party: Democratic Party
- Education: Georgetown University, University of Montana
- Profession: Attorney

John W. Parker is an attorney serving as a Judge for Montana's 8th Judicial District Court. Before this, he served as a Democratic Party member of the Montana House of Representatives, representing District 23 from 2002 to 2008. During his tenure, he also served as the State House Minority Leader. He unsuccessfully sought the Democratic nomination for Montana Attorney General 2008, being defeated by Steve Bullock.
