= Jennifer Fielder =

Montana senator

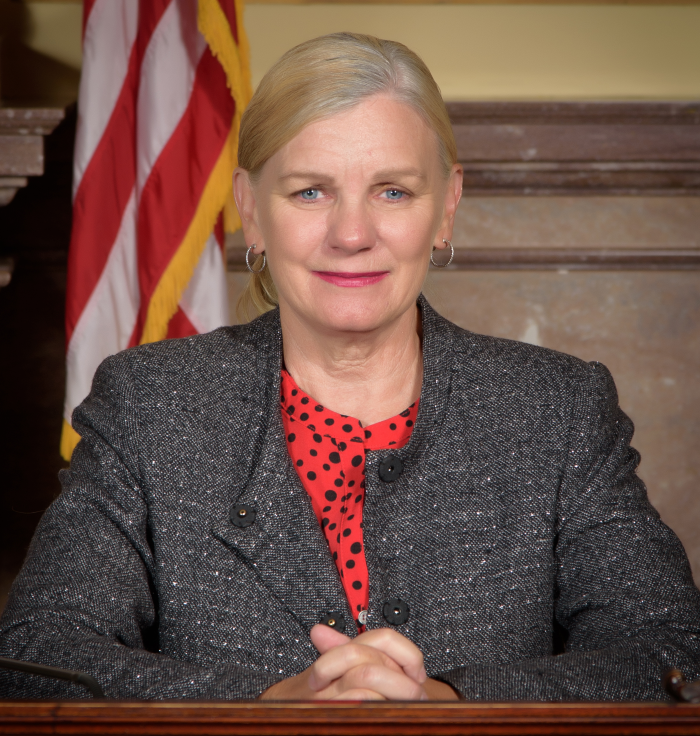

Member of the Montana Public Service Commission from the 4th district
- Incumbent
- Assumed office January 2, 2021
- Preceded by: Bob Lake

Member of the Montana Senate from the 7th district
- In office January 7, 2013 – January 4, 2021
- Preceded by: Greg Hinkle
- Succeeded by: Bob Brown

Personal details
- Party: Republican
- Spouse: Paul Fielder
- Children: 2
- Education: Wenatchee Valley College, Wenatchee (AA, AS); Western Colorado University (BS)

Jennifer Fielder is an American politician who most recently served as a Republican serving in the Montana Senate.

== Political career ==
Fielder was first elected to the state senate in 2012. At the time she lived in Thompson Falls and represented several counties in northwest Montana, including Sanders, Mineral, and western Missoula. After serving the maximum of two terms, Fielder was succeeded in her position by fellow Republican Bob Brown. She was elected to the Montana Public Service Commission in 2020.

=== Committees ===
Fielder has served on the Environmental Quality Council and Water Policy committees in an interim fashion.

=== Legislative work ===
Fielder has advocated the transfer of federal public lands to state governments. While some organizations see the transfer as paving the way for a sell off of public lands, Fielder says it is simply intended to provide better public access.

== Career ==
Fielder is a former ski instructor and consultant, according to her website.
