= Marian Hanson =

American politician (born 1933)

Member of the Montana House of Representatives
- In office 1983–1999

Personal details
- Born: January 17, 1933 (age 93) Santa Maria, California, U.S.
- Party: Republican
- Spouse: Darrel Hanson
- Occupation: rancher

Marian W. Hanson (born January 17, 1933) is an American politician in the state of Montana who served in the Montana House of Representatives from 1996 to 2004. She served from 1993 to 1997 as Speaker pro tempore of the House. A resident of Ashland, Montana, she is a rancher. She graduated from Custer County High School in 1951.
