= Jesse Laslovich =

American politician & lawyer (born 1980)

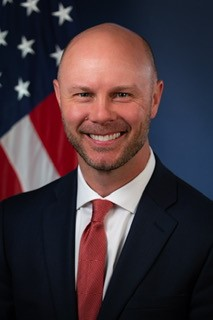
- Official portrait, 2022

United States Attorney for the District of Montana
- In office June 2, 2022 – February 17, 2025
- President: Joe Biden; Donald Trump
- Preceded by: Kurt Alme
- Succeeded by: Kurt Alme

Member of the Montana Senate from the 43rd district
- In office 2005 – February 2010
- Succeeded by: Gene Vuckovich

Member of the Montana House of Representatives
- In office 2001–2003
- Preceded by: William Menahan

Personal details
- Born: Jesse Anthony Laslovich; October 3, 1980 (age 46) Anaconda, Montana, U.S.
- Party: Democratic
- Spouse: Jill
- Education: University of Montana (BA, JD)

Jesse Anthony Laslovich (born October 3, 1980) is an American attorney and politician who served as the United States Attorney for the District of Montana from 2022 to 2025. He previously served as a member of the Montana House of Representatives and Montana Senate.

== Early life and education ==
Laslovich was born and raised in Anaconda, Montana. After graduating from Anaconda High School, he earned a Bachelor of Arts degree in political science in 2003 and his Juris Doctor from the University of Montana in 2006.

== Career ==
Laslovich has worked as an attorney for Datsopoulos, MacDonald & Lind PC of Missoula. He was an adjunct professor at the University of Montana School of Law. Laslovich was assistant attorney general to Montana Attorney General Mike McGrath. He later served as chief legal counsel to the Montana state auditor. In this role, he co-prosecuted several Ponzi schemes.

=== Montana legislature ===
In 2000, Laslovich was elected to the Montana House of Representatives at the age of 20, making him the youngest member of the 2001-2002 Montana Legislature. He had previously worked in the House as a page during the 1999-2000 session. In 2004, he was elected to the Montana State Senate where he represented SD 43 until 2010. During his time in the Montana Senate, he chaired the Senate Judiciary and Ethics Committees and served as assistant Democratic leader.

In 2007, Laslovich supported and voted unsuccessfully to pass out of committee SB 290 the "Implement National Popular Vote Act", which would have entered Montana into a pact to award the state's three electoral votes to the winner of the national popular vote, regardless of the Montana popular vote.

Laslovich resigned from the Montana Senate on February 10, 2010, to become chief legal counsel to Montana State Auditor Monica Lindeen.

=== Campaign for state attorney general ===
In 2012, Laslovich ran for Montana Attorney General. He was narrowly defeated in the Democratic primary by state Labor Commissioner Pam Bucy, who lost the general election to Republican nominee Tim Fox.

=== Campaign for state auditor ===
On April 6, 2015, Laslovich announced his candidacy for Montana state auditor. He lost the general election to Republican state Senator Matt Rosendale.

=== U.S. attorney for Montana ===
On January 26, 2022, President Joe Biden announced his intent to nominate Laslovich to be the United States attorney for the District of Montana. On January 31, 2022, his nomination was sent to the United States Senate. On May 12, 2022, his nomination was reported out of committee by voice vote. On May 17, 2022, his nomination was confirmed in the Senate by voice vote. He was sworn in by U.S. District Judge Dana L. Christensen on June 2, 2022.
