= Mitch Tropila =

American politician

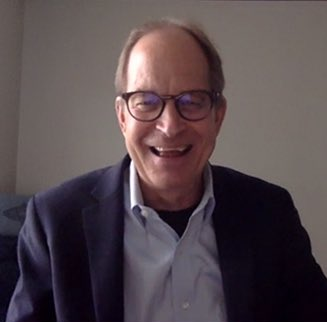
- Tropila in 2022

Member of the Montana Senate from the 12th district
- In office 2007 - 2013

Member of the Montana House of Representatives from the 26th district
- In office 2015–2017

Personal details
- Party: Democratic Party

Mitch Tropila was a Democratic Party member of the Montana Legislature. He served as a Senator from 2007 to 2013. In 2015 he was elected to the Montana House of Representatives, and served one term opting not to run for re-election. Tropila later became a public policy officer and advocate.
