= Montana Public Service Commission =

State regulatory board of Montana

The Montana Public Service Commission (PSC) is a quasi-judicial regulatory board of elected officials in the U.S. state of Montana.

The PSC regulates private, investor-owned natural gas, electric, telephone, water and private sewer companies doing business in Montana. In addition, the PSC regulates intrastate railroads and certain motor carriers hauling regulated commodities. The PSC oversees natural gas pipeline safety regulations. There is a major effort by the legislature and commissioners to put social-media companies under PSC jurisdiction as well.

== Commissioners ==
Commissioners of the PSC are elected from the five districts across the state. Since 1975, commissioners have served staggered four-year terms.

District	Name	Party	Residence	Start	Next Election
1	Randy Pinocci	Rep	Sun River	January 1, 2019	2026 (term limited)
2	Brad Molnar	Rep	N/A	January 6, 2025 (Note: Molnar has been suspended from July 9, 2026 – present.)	2028
3	Jeff Welborn, President	Rep	Dillon	January 6, 2025	2028
4	Jennifer Fielder, Vice President	Rep	Thompson Falls	January 4, 2021	2028 (term limited)
5	Annie Bukacek	Rep	N/A	January 2, 2023	2026

Democrat former District 3 Commissioner John Vincent of Gallatin Gateway and District 4 Commissioner Gail Gutsche, also a Democrat, lost their bids for a second term on the commission during the November 2012 election to Koopman and Hamilton, both Republicans. The 2012 election created the first all-Republican commission since its establishment in 1975 as a five-member commission.

Republican Brad Johnson, former Secretary of State of Montana, bested state Rep. Galen Hollenbaugh in the November 2014 election to fill the District 5 seat on the PSC. Commission Chairman Bill Gallagher, a Helena Republican, opted not to seek reelection to the seat amid an ongoing battle with pancreatic cancer, which he said could limit his ability to serve a second term on the commission.

== Districts ==
The 5 districts of the Commission are separated by state house districts as follows:

District 1:

- 19, 20, 21, 22, 23, 26, 27, 28, 29, 30, 31, 32, 33, 34, 35, 36, 38, 43, 44, 45

District 2:

- 39, 40, 41, 42, 46, 47, 48, 49, 50, 51, 52, 53, 54, 55, 56, 57, 58, 59, 61, 62

District 3:

- 37, 60, 63, 64, 65, 66, 67, 68, 69, 70, 71, 72, 73, 74, 75, 77, 78, 79, 85, 86

District 4:

- 1, 2, 6, 8, 9, 10, 12, 13, 14, 87, 88, 89, 90, 93, 94, 95, 96, 97, 98, 100

District 5:

- 3, 4, 5, 7, 11, 15, 16, 17, 18, 24, 25, 76, 80, 81, 82, 83, 84, 91, 92, 99

== Operations ==
The PSC's office is located at 1701 Prospect Ave. in Helena, Montana, where a staff of more than 30 employees, including economists, engineers, attorneys, rate analysts and others, work for the Department of Public Service Regulation. The agency works to "fairly balance the long-term interests of Montana utility and transportation companies and the customers they serve," according to the agency's Mission Statement. The department operates under the executive branch of Montana government, with the Public Service Commission overseeing the department, the Mission Statement states.

The commission generally meets once per week for its general business meeting — typically at 9:30 a.m. each Tuesday — with audio and video of the meeting streaming online at www.psc.mt.gov. Meeting times and dates may change depending on commissioners' travel schedules and the scheduling of other matters before the commission. Commission meetings are open to the public in the Bollinger Room at the PSC offices in Helena. The commission occasionally meets in executive session to discuss issues it, or the agency's attorneys, believe fall within the guidelines for closing a meeting per the state's open meeting laws. While the PSC is a public agency, utilities have the option to seek a protection order and request documents be held confidential by the commission, but must make a showing to the commission that the information meets guidelines for protection as outlined in section 38.2.5007 of the state of Montana's procedural rules for public service regulation.

Because the job is often complex and requires a thorough understanding of the utility industry, the commission relies on its staff for a wide range of research, data analysis and number crunching. The PSC's staff often appears before the commission during its weekly business meetings to discuss findings and research pertaining to matters before the commission.

The Public Service Commission likens the process of establishing utility rates to that of a banker considering a loan. While the agency doesn't loan money, "It analyzes the company's financial statements for accuracy, examines its operating practices to ensure efficiency, and reviews known future events that may affect the business."

The Commission's website, however, points out a significant contrast between the role of a banker and that of a commissioner:

"The banker would be pleased if a loan applicant could make very high profits. By law, the PSC must allow only those profits that are just and reasonable. In other words, the PSC must allow utilities an opportunity to earn just enough profit so that utility owners will have the incentives to provide adequate service to customers. No more, no less. It is this public interest protection that makes the PSC unique. The Montana Consumer Counsel, meanwhile, represents Montana consumers and intervenes on behalf of the ratepayers on issues before the Public Service Commission.

While the job of regulating utilities can be highly technical, the five commissioners and dozens of staff employees review filings made with the agency. Commissioners work within the agency from individual offices near the Capitol in Helena. Also housed within the agency are the Legal, Utility and Transportation/Centralized Services divisions.
