= Gail Gutsche =

American politician

- Employer: Montana Organizing Project
- Political party: Democratic

Gail Gutsche is an American activist and Democratic Party state politician in Montana. She is a candidate for the elected position of member for District 4 of the Montana Public Service Commission, a regulatory tribunal that regulates public utilities in the state.

She served four terms in the Montana House of Representatives and one term (2008–2012) as a member (commissioner) of the Montana Public Service Commission. She is executive director of the Montana Organizing Project, an advocacy group based in Missoula, Montana.
