= Linda McCulloch =

American politician (born 1954)

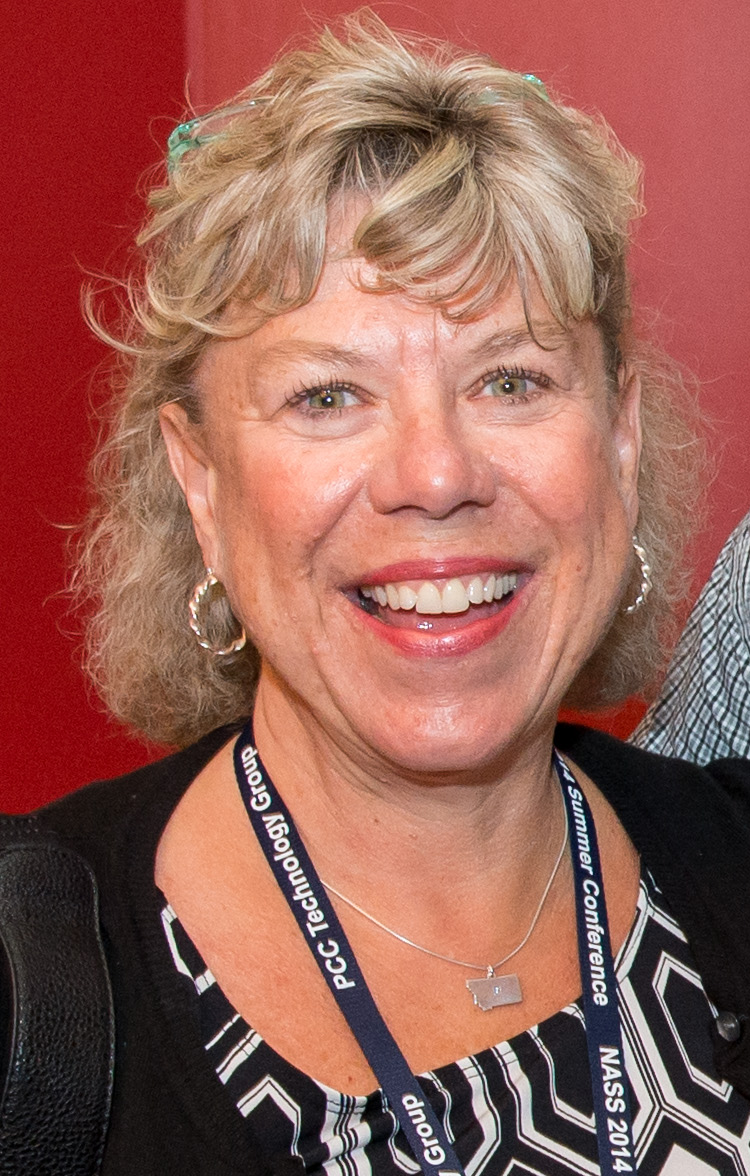
- McCulloch in 2014

20th Secretary of State of Montana
- In office January 5, 2009 – January 2, 2017
- Governor: Brian Schweitzer; Steve Bullock
- Preceded by: Brad Johnson
- Succeeded by: Corey Stapleton

15th Superintendent of Public Instruction of Montana
- In office January 1, 2001 – January 5, 2009
- Governor: Judy Martz; Brian Schweitzer
- Preceded by: Nancy Keenan
- Succeeded by: Denise Juneau

Member of the Montana House of Representatives from the 70th district
- In office January 2, 1995 – January 1, 2001
- Preceded by: Robert J. Pavlovich
- Succeeded by: Holly Raser

Personal details
- Born: December 21, 1954 (age 71) Springfield, Ohio, U.S.
- Party: Democratic
- Education: University of Montana, Missoula (BA, MA)

Linda McCulloch (born December 21, 1954) is an American politician who is formerly the secretary of state of Montana. She was the first woman to serve in that post. She left her previous post as state superintendent of public instruction due to term limits, which she also reached as Secretary of State.

== Political career ==
McCulloch is a Democrat and was elected to the office in November 2008 and took office in January 2009. She defeated Republican Brad Johnson. McCulloch previously served as state superintendent of public instruction from 2000 to 2008, before reaching the term limit. From 1995 to 2000, she had been a representative in the Montana House of Representatives.

McCulloch's initial campaign was based on increasing voter participation and supporting state businesses. Early in her first term, McCulloch oversaw a project to update the records system for 40,000 boxes of the state's stored documents from a 1978 mainframe to modern software, based on her background as a school librarian, in order to allow web-based communication between businesses and the Secretary of State. She also backed legislation to update state notary documentation and requirements.

McCulloch supported online voter registration in Montana throughout both of her terms, with the caveat of requiring a valid Montana ID to register online.

In 2016, the Montana Secretary of State's Office added increased satellite offices in reservation areas to improve voting access after a 2012 tribal suit over equitable voting access, which McCulloch viewed as a start for improving access. Community leaders and county election officials also pressed the need for more publicity over the new voting offices to increase turnout. The Office also saw increases in absentee voting during this same time period. McCulloch opposed a measure to remove same-day voter registration in Montana, which Montana citizens also ultimately voted against.

McCulloch won re-election in 2012 for another 4-year term. She was ineligible to run again in 2016 due to term limits, and was succeeded by Republican Corey Stapleton.

She currently serves on the Board of Advisors of Let America Vote, an organization founded by former Missouri Secretary of State Jason Kander that aims to end voter suppression.

== Personal life ==
McCulloch was born in Springfield, Ohio, and grew up in South Charleston, Ohio. She graduated from Southeastern High School, and attended OSU. In 1982, she received her BA in Elementary Education from the University of Montana, followed in 1990 by her MA in Elementary Education from the same institution. She has previously worked as a paraprofessional teacher, substitute teacher, school librarian, and teacher. She is divorced.

== Electoral history ==
Montana House of Representatives 70th District Election, 1994
Party	Candidate	Votes	%
Democratic	Linda McCulloch	1,771	50.66
Republican	Tim Sayles	1,725	49.34

Montana House of Representatives 70th District Election, 1996
Party	Candidate	Votes	%
Democratic	Linda McCulloch (inc.)	2,689	62.48
Republican	Drew Lesofski	1,486	34.53
Libertarian	E. L. Bernosky	129	3.00

Montana House of Representatives 70th District Election, 1998
Party	Candidate	Votes	%
Democratic	Linda McCulloch (inc.)	2,053	60.26
Republican	Hal Schaible	1,354	39.74

Montana Superintendent of Public Instruction Democratic Primary Election, 2000
Party	Candidate	Votes	%
Democratic	Linda McCulloch	31,572	34.39
Democratic	Gail Gray	31,508	34.32
Democratic	Mike Schwinden	28,739	31.30

Montana Superintendent of Public Instruction Election, 2000
Party	Candidate	Votes	%
Democratic	Linda McCulloch	206,941	53
Republican	Elaine Sollie Herman	162,069	41
Reform	Larry Foust	22,952	6

Montana Superintendent of Public Instruction Democratic Primary Election, 2004
Party	Candidate	Votes	%
Democratic	Linda McCulloch (inc.)	75,504	86.49
Democratic	Clarence Kimm, Sr.	11,797	13.51

Montana Superintendent of Public Instruction Election, 2004
Party	Candidate	Votes	%
Democratic	Linda McCulloch (inc.)	246,204	56.89
Republican	Bob Anderson	186,338	43.06

Montana Secretary of State Election, 2008
Party	Candidate	Votes	%
Democratic	Linda McCulloch	233,717	49.32
Republican	Brad Johnson (inc.)	228,412	48.20
Constitution	Sieglinde Sharbono	11,722	2.47

Montana Secretary of State Election, 2012
Party	Candidate	Votes	%
Democratic	Linda McCulloch (inc.)	245,024	51.41
Republican	Brad Johnson	214,976	45.10
Libertarian	Roger Roots	16,622	3.49

Political offices
Preceded by Nancy Keenan	Superintendent of Public Instruction of Montana; 2001–2009	Succeeded by Denise Juneau
Preceded by Brad Johnson	Secretary of State of Montana; 2009–2017	Succeeded by Corey Stapleton
