= Denise Juneau =

American lawyer

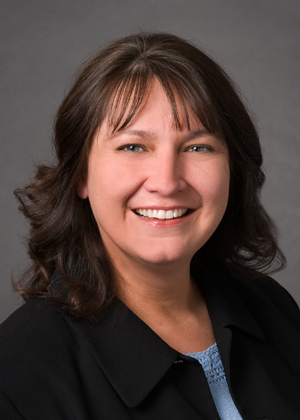
- Juneau in 2010

Superintendent of Seattle Public Schools
- In office July 1, 2018 – May 1, 2021
- Preceded by: Larry Nyland
- Succeeded by: Brent Jones (acting)

16th Superintendent of Public Instruction of Montana
- In office January 5, 2009 – January 2, 2017
- Governor: Brian Schweitzer; Steve Bullock
- Preceded by: Linda McCulloch
- Succeeded by: Elsie Arntzen

Personal details
- Born: April 5, 1967 (age 59) Oakland, California, U.S.
- Party: Democratic
- Parent(s): Stan and Carol Juneau
- Education: Montana State University (BA); Harvard University (MEd); University of Montana (JD)

Denise Juneau (born April 5, 1967) is an American attorney, educator, and politician from the U.S. state of Montana who served as the state's Superintendent of Public Instruction from 2009 to 2017. She is a Democrat and the first female Native American elected to statewide office in the United States. Her mother is Mandan, Hidatsa, and Arikara, while her father is Blackfoot.

On November 4, 2015, Juneau announced her candidacy for the United States House of Representatives in the 2016 congressional election. Juneau was defeated by incumbent Republican Ryan Zinke in the 2016 general election.

In April 2018, the Seattle Public Schools board unanimously voted to elect Juneau as the next superintendent of Seattle Public Schools. She began on July 1, 2018. She resigned from the post on May 1, 2021.

== Early life and education ==
Denise Juneau was born on April 5, 1967, in Oakland, California, to parents Stan and Carol Juneau. Her family moved to Montana in 1969. Juneau graduated in 1985 from Browning High School in Browning, Montana, which is on the Blackfeet Indian Reservation.

Juneau received a bachelor's degree in English from Montana State University in 1993. In 1994, she completed her Master of Education Degree at Harvard Graduate School of Education. She took course work toward a doctorate at the University of New Mexico in 1997 and 1998. Juneau shifted her career path, attending the University of Montana Law School and completing her J.D. in 2004.

== Career ==
=== Early career ===
Juneau worked on the educational support staff of Browning, Montana schools from 1986 through 1988. She was a high school teacher in New Town, North Dakota, within the Fort Berthold Indian Reservation, from 1994 through 1995, and in Browning, Montana, from 1995 through 1997.

Juneau was an instructional specialist at the Montana Office of Public Instruction under Superintendent Nancy Keenan from 1998 through 2001. While at the Montana Office of Public Instruction, Juneau served as Director of Indian Education, where she oversaw the implementation of Montana's constitutionally mandated Indian Education For All program. It was designed to deliver education in the public schools on Montana's American Indian heritage.

Juneau was a law clerk at the Montana Supreme Court for justices Jim Regnier and Brian Morris from 2004 through 2005. She worked as an associate attorney for the law firm Monteau and Peebles from 2005 to 2006. From 2006 through 2008, she was a division administrator at the Office of Public Instruction under Superintendent Linda McCulloch. In 2009, Juneau was named Educator of the Year by the National Indian Education Association.

=== Political campaigns ===
In 2008, Juneau ran for Superintendent of Public Instruction. She won a four-way Democratic primary in June. In the November general election, the final vote tally was 234,483 for Juneau (51%), 201,091 (43.7%) for her GOP opponent, Elaine Sollie Herman, and 24,236 (5.3%) for Libertarian candidate Donald Eisenmenger. She was the first American Indian woman to win a statewide office.

In 2012, Juneau ran for re-election against Republican Sandy Welch. Juneau was narrowly re-elected, receiving 235,397 votes to Welch's 233,166 votes. Due to term limits, Juneau was ineligible to run again in 2016.

Juneau was named as a possible candidate for US Senator Max Baucus's (D-Montana) seat, which was vacated upon his retirement in 2014. On August 5, 2013, she announced that she would not run for the Senate.

On November 4, 2015, Juneau announced her candidacy for Montana's lone seat in the U.S. House of Representatives. As of November 1, 2016, she ranked 6th in the country for congressional candidates raising money from donors giving $200 or less. Juneau was defeated by incumbent Republican representative Ryan Zinke in the general election. Juneau won 40% of the vote.

=== Montana State Superintendent of Public Instruction ===
Since Juneau took office in 2009, she reported that Montana's graduation rate increased 4.7 percent, while the dropout rate decreased 1.3 percent since the state had started tracking these numbers in 2000. Juneau oversaw the development of Montana's "Schools of Promise Initiative", an $11.5 million, three-year project which used federal grant money "to help teachers' union leaders, school board officials, and administrators attempt to address students' academic and social-emotional needs in some of the state's most disadvantaged schools." The academic results of that program have been mixed.

Juneau gave a speech at the 2012 Democratic National Convention in which she praised U.S. President Barack Obama's education policy.

In 2015, Juneau was awarded the Alumni Council Award for Outstanding Contributions to Education, from the Harvard Graduate School of Education. She also received the National Education Association's 2015 Leo Reano Memorial Award.

=== Superintendent of Seattle Public Schools ===
In April 2018, Seattle Public Schools board unanimously voted to elect Denise Juneau as the next superintendent of Seattle Public Schools. She began on July 1, 2018.

In March 2020, during the COVID-19 pandemic, and with Washington state's schools closed, she announced that Seattle Public Schools would not transition to online learning, for equity reasons.

== Personal life ==
Juneau is an enrolled citizen of the federally recognized Mandan, Hidatsa, and Arikara Nation through her mother, Carol Juneau. Her father, Stan Juneau, was enrolled with the Blackfeet Nation and died of COVID-19 in 2020. She is also a descendant of the Tlingit and Haida peoples.

She is openly gay and the first such candidate to run for federal office in Montana. In November 2015, Juneau confirmed she had twice been arrested while a college student for driving under the influence.

== Electoral history ==
Montana Superintendent of Public Instruction Democratic primary election, 2008
Party	Candidate	Votes	%
Democratic	Denise Juneau	54,031	37.54
Democratic	Holly Raser	35,636	24.76
Democratic	Sam Kitzenberg	30,207	20.98
Democratic	Claudette Morton	24,074	16.72

Montana Superintendent of Public Instruction Election, 2008
Party	Candidate	Votes	%
Democratic	Denise Juneau	234,483	51.00
Republican	Elaine Sollie Herman	201,091	43.73
Libertarian	Donald Eisenmenger	24,236	5.27

Montana Superintendent of Public Instruction Election, 2012
Party	Candidate	Votes	%
Democratic	Denise Juneau (inc.)	235,397	50.24
Republican	Sandy Welch	233,166	49.76

== See also ==
- List of Native American politicians
- Native American women in politics
