= Elsie Arntzen =

American educator and politician

17th Montana Superintendent of Public Instruction
- In office January 2, 2017 – January 6, 2025
- Governor: Steve Bullock; Greg Gianforte
- Preceded by: Denise Juneau
- Succeeded by: Susie Hedalen

Member of the Montana Senate
- In office January 5, 2015 – January 2, 2017
- Preceded by: Mary Caferro
- Succeeded by: Margaret MacDonald
- Constituency: 26th district
- In office January 7, 2013 – January 5, 2015
- Preceded by: Gary Branae
- Succeeded by: Cary Smith
- Constituency: 27th district

Member of the Montana House of Representatives from the 53rd district
- In office January 3, 2005 – January 7, 2013
- Preceded by: Christine Kaufmann
- Succeeded by: Dave Hagstrom

Personal details
- Born: May 7, 1956 (age 70) Billings, Montana, U.S.
- Party: Republican
- Spouse: Steven Arntzen
- Children: 2
- Education: University of Montana (BA); Montana State University (BA)

Elsie Arntzen (born May 7, 1956) is an American educator and politician from the U.S. state of Montana who served as the Superintendent of Public Instruction of the State of Montana. Prior to this, she was a member of the Montana Legislature.

She is the tenth woman to hold the position.

== Early life and career ==
In 1992, Arntzen became a 5th grade school teacher for the Billings School District.

== Montana State Legislature ==
In 2004, Arntzen was elected to Montana House of Representatives for District 53, which includes a portion of Yellowstone County.

In 2012 Arntzen was elected to the Montana Senate for a four-year term.

== Superintendent of Public Instruction ==
In 2016, Arntzen was elected as the Montana Superintendent of Public Instruction, which leads the state's prime education agency, the Montana Office of Public Instruction.

In Artzen's first year in office, Montana received $24 million over the course of three years through the U.S. Department of Education's Striving Readers Comprehensive Literacy Program, in effort to advance literacy skills in the state. As the newly elected superintendent, Arntzen was responsible in implementing the Every Student Succeeds Act (ESSA) in Montana. Her office released their state ESSA plan in September 2017 and subsequently had the plan approved by the U.S. Department of Education in January 2018. In the same year, Arntzen offered new online mental health and suicide prevention resources available for teachers. The program is provided through Montana's Learning Hub through the Project AWARE-MT SOARS grant funding. The contract, with Kognito Interactive Programs, provided unlimited access for all Montana educators, school staff, and OPI partners over a 12-month period. In June 2018, Arntzen announced that Montana was one of ten states to receive a $3.4 million grant from the U.S. Department of Defense for the Troops to Teachers program. Arntzen's Montana Ready initiative has promoted career and technical education, work-based learning, individualized learning, and expanded public-private partnerships.

During the 2019 Montana legislative session, she advocated for legislation to keep predators out of Montana classrooms. In an editorial published on January 31, 2019, Arntzen criticized the Montana Public Education Center (MT-PEC) for opposing the Student Safety Accountability Act, which banned sexual activity between an employee of a school district and a student. MT-PEC is noted as being a statewide organization that is composed of the Montana School Boards Association, the School Administrators of Montana, the Montana Quality Education Coalition, the Montana Federation of Public Employees, and the Montana Association of School Business Officials.

She is a member of the Council of Chief State School Officers School Safety Steering Committee.

== Personal life ==
Arntzen's husband is Steven. They have two children. Arntzen and her family live in Billings, Montana. Her husband, Steven is the president and CEO of Century Gaming Technologies. Century Gaming Technologies is the largest route operator of gambling gaming machines in Montana.

In 1992, Arntzen became a 5th grade school teacher for the Billings School District.

== Electoral history ==
=== 2004 ===
2004 General Election for Montana's 53rd House of Representatives District
Party	Candidate	Votes	%
Republican	Elsie Arntzen	2,125	54.61
Democratic	Carol A. Gibson (incumbent)	1,766	45.39
Total votes		3,891	100
Republican gain from Democratic			

=== 2006 ===
2006 General Election for Montana's 53rd House of Representatives District
Party	Candidate	Votes	%
Republican	Elsie Arntzen (incumbent)	2,084	64.86
Democratic	Teddee Cuomo	1,129	35.14
Total votes		3,213	100

=== 2008 ===
2008 General Election for Montana's 53rd House of Representatives District
Party	Candidate	Votes	%
Republican	Elsie Arntzen (incumbent)	2,200	58.05
Democratic	Linda Wetzel	1,590	41.95
Total votes		3,790	100

=== 2010 ===
2010 General Election for Montana's 53rd House of Representatives District
Party	Candidate	Votes	%
Republican	Elsie Arntzen (incumbent)	1,572	60.51
Democratic	Chris "Shoots" Veis	1,026	39.49
Total votes		2,598	100

=== 2012 ===
2012 General Election for Montana's 27th State Senate District
Party	Candidate	Votes	%
Republican	Elsie Arntzen	3,414	51.42
Democratic	Gary Branae	3,225	48.58
Total votes		6,639	100

=== 2016 ===
2016 General Election for State Superintendent of Public Instruction
Party	Candidate	Votes	%
Republican	Elsie Arntzen	253,790	51.65
Democratic	Melissa Romano	237,590	48.35
Total votes		491,380	100

=== 2020 ===
2020 General Election for State Superintendent of Public Instruction
Party	Candidate	Votes	%
Republican	Elsie Arntzen (incumbent)	310,111	52.19
Democratic	Melissa Romano	259,886	43.74
Libertarian	Kevin Leatherbarrow	24,202	4.07
Total votes		594,199	100

Political offices
Preceded by Denise Juneau	Montana Superintendent of Public Instruction; 2017–2025	Succeeded by Susie Hedalen
