= Montana Office of Public Instruction =

State agency of Montana

Agency overview
- Jurisdiction: State of Montana
- Headquarters: Helena, Montana
- Annual budget: $1.009 billion (2019)
- Agency executive: Susie Hedalen, Superintendent of Public Instruction
- Website: opi.mt.gov

The Montana Office of Public Instruction (OPI) is the state education agency of Montana. Susie Hedalen currently serves as the Montana Superintendent of Public Instruction. The agency is headquartered in Helena.

The people of Montana have elected a Superintendent of Public Instruction as one of the five members of the executive branch since 1889. By law, the superintendent has general supervision of the K-12 public schools and school districts. The superintendent also serves as a member of the Land Board, the State Library Commission, and as an ex officio non-voting member of the Board of Public Education, the Board of Regents, and the Board of Education.

== School data 2018-19 ==
School Data 2018-2019
Elementary Schools	435
Middle, 7&8, Junior High Schools	217
High Schools	171
Total Schools	823

== School graduation rates ==
School Year	Graduation Rate
2017-2018	86.39%
2016-2017	85.83%
2015-2016	85.64%
2014-2015	86.04%
2013-2014	85.43%
2012-2013	84.41%

== Denise Juneau 2009-2017 ==
Denise Juneau took office on January 5, 2009. In that same year tobacco use among Montana teens declined and student Student ACT scores were reporting up in 2009 from 2008. However, those two 2009 reported successes were attributed to the previous superintendent of Public Instruction, Linda McCulloch. In that same year math scores showed that Montana fourth and eighth–graders continued to test above the national average, and the number of students who struggle with reading was down from 2008.

In 2009, Montana's leadership in key Indian Education policies was recognized. Bozeman middle–school student Marina Dimitrov became America's Top Young Scientist. The National Indian Education Association named Denise Juneau 2009 Educator of the Year, and under Juneau's leadership Montana became one of only seven states receiving grants to increase the number of graduates.

At the end of 2009, Montana was awarded grants for schools to provide fresh fruits and vegetables to students. Juneau also promoted local agriculture through farm to school programs.

== Montana Superintendents of Public Instruction ==
Name	Years
Susie Hedalen	2025-
Elsie Arntzen	2017–2025
Denise Juneau	2009–2017
Linda McCulloch	2001–2009
Nancy Keenan	1989–2001
Ed Argenbright	1981–1989
Georgia Ruth Rice	1977–1981
Dolores Colburg	1969–1977
Harriet Miller	1957–1969
Mary M. Condon	1949–1957
Elizabeth Ireland	1941–1949
Ruth Reardon	1937–1941
Mary Trumper	1917–1929
Henry A. Davee	1905–1917
W. W. Welch	1901–1905
E. W. Carlton	1897–1901
E. A. Steere	1893–1897
John Gannon	1889–1893
