= 1980 Montana House of Representatives election =

- November 4, 1980

All 100 seats in the Montana House of Representatives 51 seats needed for a majority
	Majority party	Minority party
	Rep	Dem
Leader	Jack Ramirez (retired)	Harold E. Gerke (lost re-election)
Party	Republican	Democratic
Leader's seat	64th-Billings	62nd-Billings
Last election	45	55
Seats after	57	43
Seat change	▲12	▼12
Speaker before election
Harold E. Gerke
Democratic
Elected Speaker
Bob Marks
Republican

The 1980 Montana House of Representatives election took place on November 4, 1980, with the primary election held on June 3, 1980. Montana voters elected all 100 members of the Montana House of Representatives to serve two-year terms. The election coincided with United States national elections and Montana state elections, including U.S. President, U.S. House, Montana Governor, and Montana Senate.

Following the previous election in 1978, Democrats held a 55-to-45-seat majority over Republicans. Republicans flipped control of the chamber in 1980 by winning 57 seats while Democrats held 43—giving Republicans a net gain of 12 seats. The newly elected members served in the 47th Montana State Legislature, during which Republican Bob Marks was elected Speaker of the Montana House.

== Retiring incumbents ==
=== Democrats ===
1. District 17: Jack Brian Uhde
2. District 24: Joseph M. Magone
3. District 36: Joe Tropila
4. District 37: Arlyne Reichert
5. District 38: Peter J. Gilligan Jr.
6. District 43: Jonas H. Rosenthal
7. District 46: Hershel M. Robbins
8. District 49: Edward Lien
9. District 50: E. N. "Ernie" Dassinger
10. District 51: Carroll V. South
11. District 54: William M. "Willie" Day
12. District 60: Gene Frates
13. District 67: Polly Holmes
14. District 83: Mike Cooney

=== Republicans ===
1. District 1: Dennis G. Nathe
2. District 15: W. F. Bennett
3. District 53: Oscar S. Kvaalen
4. District 64: Jack Ramirez
5. District 65: Howard C. Porter
6. District 93: Howard L. Ellis

== Incumbents defeated in primary election ==
=== Democrats ===
1. District 13: George R. Johnston
2. District 33: John B. Staigmiller

== Incumbents defeated in general election ==
=== Democrats ===
1. District 19: Pat Gesek
2. District 21: William R. "Bill" Baeth
3. District 52: Les J. Hirsch
4. District 62: Harold E. Gerke
5. District 72: Vicki Johnson Hyatt
6. District 76: John P. Scully
7. District 82: Bill Hand

=== Republicans ===
1. District 14: Harriet Hayne
2. District 55: L. E. "Gene" Wood
3. District 56: Harold A. Wyrick

== Summary of results ==
Italics denote an open seat held by the incumbent party; bold text denotes a gain for a party.

State house district	Incumbent	Party	Elected representative	Outcome
1	Dennis G. Nathe	Rep	**Glenn E. Jacobsen**	**Dem gain**
2	Art Lund	Rep	Art Lund	Rep hold
3	Orren C. Vinger	Rep	Orren C. Vinger	Rep hold
4	G. C. "Jerry" Feda	Rep	G. C. "Jerry" Feda	Rep hold
5	Paul K. Kropp	Rep	Paul K. Kropp	Rep hold
6	Francis Bardanouve	Dem	Francis Bardanouve	Dem hold
7	Robert Sivertsen	Rep	Robert Sivertsen	Rep hold
8	Danny Oberg	Dem	Danny Oberg	Dem hold
9	Dennis Iverson	Rep	Dennis Iverson	Rep hold
10	Audrey G. Roth	Rep	Audrey G. Roth	Rep hold
11	Rex Manuel	Dem	Rex Manuel	Dem hold
12	Melvin Underdal	Rep	Melvin Underdal	Rep hold
13	George R. Johnston	Dem	Glenn A. Roush	Dem hold
14	Harriet Hayne	Rep	**Roland F. Kennerly**	**Dem gain**
15	W. F. Bennett	Rep	Gary W. Bennett	Rep hold
16	Robert Lewis Anderson	Rep	Robert Lewis Anderson	Rep hold
17	Jack Brian Uhde	Dem	**Alison R. Conn**	**Rep gain**
18	Michael H. Keedy	Dem	Michael H. Keedy	Dem hold
19	Pat Gesek	Dem	**John G. Harp**	**Rep gain**
20	Aubyn A. Curtiss	Rep	Aubyn A. Curtiss	Rep hold
21	William R. "Bill" Baeth	Dem	**Glenn H. Mueller**	**Rep gain**
22	Arthur H. "Art" Shelden	Dem	Arthur H. "Art" Shelden	Dem hold
23	Chris H. Stobie	Rep	Chris H. Stobie	Rep hold
24	Joseph M. Magone	Dem	**Aaron W. Andreason**	**Rep gain**
25	William Ray Jensen	Rep	William Ray Jensen	Rep hold
26	Carl A. Seifert	Rep	Carl A. Seifert	Rep hold
27	Verner L. Bertelsen	Rep	Verner L. Bertelsen	Rep hold
28	Joe Brand	Dem	Joe Brand	Dem hold
29	Gene Donaldson	Rep	Gene Donaldson	Rep hold
30	Hal Harper	Dem	Hal Harper	Dem hold
31	Jerry Metcalf	Dem	Jerry Metcalf	Dem hold
32	Barbara J. "Bobby" Spilker	Rep	Barbara J. "Bobby" Spilker	Rep hold
33	John B. Staigmiller	Dem	Ted Neuman	Dem hold
34	Helen G. O'Connell	Dem	Helen G. O'Connell	Dem hold
35	Richard E. "Dick" Manning	Dem	Richard E. "Dick" Manning	Dem hold
36	Joe Tropila	Dem	**Toni Bergene**	**Rep gain**
37	Arlyne Reichert	Dem	L. H. "Les" Nilson	Dem hold
38	Peter J. Gilligan Jr.	Dem	**John G. Matsko**	**Rep gain**
39	Paul G. Pistoria	Dem	Paul G. Pistoria	Dem hold
40	Andrea "Andy" Hemstad	Rep	Andrea "Andy" Hemstad	Rep hold
41	Jack K. Moore	Rep	Jack K. Moore	Rep hold
42	Darryl Meyer	Rep	Darryl Meyer	Rep hold
43	Jonas H. Rosenthal	Dem	**John E. Phillips**	**Rep gain**
44	W. Jay Fabrega	Rep	W. Jay Fabrega	Rep hold
45	Burt L. Hurwitz	Rep	Burt L. Hurwitz	Rep hold
46	Hershel M. Robbins	Dem	Gay Holliday	Dem hold
47	Gene N. Ernst	Rep	Gene N. Ernst	Rep hold
48	James M. Schultz	Rep	James M. Schultz	Rep hold
49	Edward Lien	Dem	**John A. Ryan**	**Rep gain**
50	E. N. "Ernie" Dassinger	Dem	**Tom Asay**	**Rep gain**
51	Carroll V. South	Dem	Carl J. Zabrocki	Dem hold
52	Les J. Hirsch	Dem	**Michael G. "Gerry" Devlin**	**Rep gain**
53	Oscar S. Kvaalen	Rep	**John M. Shontz**	**Dem gain**
54	William M. "Willie" Day	Dem	**L. Dean Switzer**	**Rep gain**
55	L. E. "Gene" Wood	Rep	**Marjorie Hart**	**Dem gain**
56	Harold A. Wyrick	Rep	**Hubert J. Abrams**	**Dem gain**
57	Carl M. Smith	Rep	Carl M. Smith	Rep hold
58	Thomas R. Conroy	Dem	Thomas R. Conroy	Dem hold
59	Esther G. Bengtson	Dem	Esther G. Bengtson	Dem hold
60	Gene Frates	Dem	**Les Kitselman**	**Rep gain**
61	Robert Dozier	Dem	Robert Dozier	Dem hold
62	Harold E. Gerke	Dem	**David A. O'Hara**	**Rep gain**
63	Harrison G. Fagg	Rep	Harrison G. Fagg	Rep hold
64	Jack Ramirez	Rep	Chuck Cozzens	Rep hold
65	Howard C. Porter	Rep	Calvin Winslow	Rep hold
66	Gerald R. Kessler	Dem	Gerald R. Kessler	Dem hold
67	Polly Holmes	Dem	**Tom Hannah**	**Rep gain**
68	Herb Huennekens	Dem	Herb Huennekens	Dem hold
69	Wes Teague	Dem	Wes Teague	Dem hold
70	J. Melvin "Mel" Williams	Dem	J. Melvin "Mel" Williams	Dem hold
71	James H. "Jim" Burnett	Rep	James H. "Jim" Burnett	Rep hold
72	Vicki Johnson Hyatt	Dem	**Jean McLane**	**Rep gain**
73	Orval S. Ellison	Rep	Orval S. Ellison	Rep hold
74	Dan Yardley	Dem	Dan Yardley	Dem hold
75	Robert A. Ellerd	Rep	Robert A. Ellerd	Rep hold
76	John P. Scully	Dem	**Norm Wallin**	**Rep gain**
77	Kenneth Nordtvedt	Rep	Kenneth Nordtvedt	Rep hold
78	John Vincent	Dem	John Vincent	Dem hold
79	Walter R. Sales	Rep	Walter R. Sales	Rep hold
80	Robert L. "Bob" Marks	Rep	Robert L. "Bob" Marks	Rep hold
81	Kerry Keyser	Rep	Kerry Keyser	Rep hold
82	Bill Hand	Dem	**G. H. "Harold" Briggs**	**Rep gain**
83	Mike Cooney	Dem	Dave Brown	Dem hold
84	Joe Quilici	Dem	Joe Quilici	Dem hold
85	Kathleen McBride	Dem	Kathleen McBride	Dem hold
86	Robert J. "Bob" Pavlovich	Dem	Robert J. "Bob" Pavlovich	Dem hold
87	Fred "Fritz" Daily	Dem	Fred "Fritz" Daily	Dem hold
88	Dan W. Harrington	Dem	Dan W. Harrington	Dem hold
89	Joe F. Kanduch Sr.	Dem	Joe F. Kanduch Sr.	Dem hold
90	William "Red" Menahan	Dem	William "Red" Menahan	Dem hold
91	Ken Robbins	Dem	Ken Robbins	Dem hold
92	Bob Thoft	Rep	Bob Thoft	Rep hold
93	Howard L. Ellis	Rep	В. Т. "Ben" Hanson	Rep hold
94	Daniel Kemmis	Dem	Daniel Kemmis	Dem hold
95	Ann Mary Dussault	Dem	Ann Mary Dussault	Dem hold
96	James D. Azzara	Dem	James D. Azzara	Dem hold
97	Steve Waldron	Dem	Steve Waldron	Dem hold
98	R. Budd Gould	Rep	R. Budd Gould	Rep hold
99	Earl C. Lory	Rep	Earl C. Lory	Rep hold
100	Ralph S. Eudaily	Rep	Ralph S. Eudaily	Rep hold

== Detailed results by district ==
=== District 1 ===
Democratic primary results
Party	Candidate	Votes	%
Democratic	Glenn E. Jacobsen	1,003	100.00%
Total votes		1,003	100.00%

Republican primary results
Party	Candidate	Votes	%
Republican	Donald L. Hedges	624	100.00%
Total votes		624	100.00%

General election results
Party	Candidate	Votes	%
Democratic	Glenn E. Jacobsen	1,852	52.15%
Republican	Donald L. Hedges	1,699	47.85%
Total votes		3,551	100.00%
Democratic gain from Republican			

=== District 2 ===
Republican primary results
Party	Candidate	Votes	%
Republican	Art Lund (incumbent)	580	100.00%
Total votes		580	100.00%

General election results
Party	Candidate	Votes	%
Republican	Art Lund (incumbent)	2,441	100.00%
Total votes		2,441	100.00%
Republican hold			

=== District 3 ===
Democratic primary results
Party	Candidate	Votes	%
Democratic	Clinton C. Whitmer	1,054	100.00%
Total votes		1,054	100.00%

Republican primary results
Party	Candidate	Votes	%
Republican	Orren C. Vinger (incumbent)	646	100.00%
Total votes		646	100.00%

General election results
Party	Candidate	Votes	%
Republican	Orren C. Vinger (incumbent)	1,889	60.78%
Democratic	Clinton C. Whitmer	1,219	39.22%
Total votes		3,108	100.00%
Republican hold			

=== District 4 ===
Democratic primary results
Party	Candidate	Votes	%
Democratic	Don Beckman	661	100.00%
Total votes		661	100.00%

Republican primary results
Party	Candidate	Votes	%
Republican	G. C. "Jerry" Feda (incumbent)	500	100.00%
Total votes		500	100.00%

General election results
Party	Candidate	Votes	%
Republican	G. C. "Jerry" Feda (incumbent)	1,878	62.60%
Democratic	Don Beckman	1,122	37.40%
Total votes		3,000	100.00%
Republican hold			

=== District 5 ===
Democratic primary results
Party	Candidate	Votes	%
Democratic	Colleen Barnard Smith	863	100.00%
Total votes		863	100.00%

Republican primary results
Party	Candidate	Votes	%
Republican	Paul K. Kropp (incumbent)	818	100.00%
Total votes		818	100.00%

General election results
Party	Candidate	Votes	%
Republican	Paul K. Kropp (incumbent)	1,950	55.97%
Democratic	Colleen Barnard Smith	1,534	44.03%
Total votes		3,484	100.00%
Republican hold			

=== District 6 ===
Democratic primary results
Party	Candidate	Votes	%
Democratic	Francis Bardanouve (incumbent)	1,095	100.00%
Total votes		1,095	100.00%

General election results
Party	Candidate	Votes	%
Democratic	Francis Bardanouve (incumbent)	2,529	100.00%
Total votes		2,529	100.00%
Democratic hold			

=== District 7 ===
Democratic primary results
Party	Candidate	Votes	%
Democratic	Ray L. Peck	1,153	100.00%
Total votes		1,153	100.00%

Republican primary results
Party	Candidate	Votes	%
Republican	Robert Sivertsen (incumbent)	391	100.00%
Total votes		391	100.00%

General election results
Party	Candidate	Votes	%
Republican	Robert Sivertsen (incumbent)	1,864	54.58%
Democratic	Ray L. Peck	1,551	45.42%
Total votes		3,415	100.00%
Republican hold			

=== District 8 ===
Democratic primary results
Party	Candidate	Votes	%
Democratic	Danny Oberg (incumbent)	677	55.81%
Democratic	Virginia Verkuehlen	536	44.19%
Total votes		1,213	100.00%

Republican primary results
Party	Candidate	Votes	%
Republican	Michael Leeds	344	100.00%
Total votes		344	100.00%

General election results
Party	Candidate	Votes	%
Democratic	Danny Oberg (incumbent)	1,542	52.72%
Republican	Michael Leeds	1,383	47.28%
Total votes		2,925	100.00%
Democratic hold			

=== District 9 ===
Democratic primary results
Party	Candidate	Votes	%
Democratic	Erwin "Swede" Carlson	972	100.00%
Total votes		972	100.00%

Republican primary results
Party	Candidate	Votes	%
Republican	Dennis Iverson (incumbent)	636	100.00%
Total votes		636	100.00%

General election results
Party	Candidate	Votes	%
Republican	Dennis Iverson (incumbent)	2,172	70.52%
Democratic	Erwin "Swede" Carlson	908	29.48%
Total votes		3,080	100.00%
Republican hold			

=== District 10 ===
Democratic primary results
Party	Candidate	Votes	%
Democratic	Brian K. Wood	1,366	100.00%
Total votes		1,366	100.00%

Republican primary results
Party	Candidate	Votes	%
Republican	Audrey G. Roth (incumbent)	745	100.00%
Total votes		745	100.00%

General election results
Party	Candidate	Votes	%
Republican	Audrey G. Roth (incumbent)	2,210	61.70%
Democratic	Brian K. Wood	1,372	38.30%
Total votes		3,582	100.00%
Republican hold			

=== District 11 ===
Democratic primary results
Party	Candidate	Votes	%
Democratic	Rex Manuel (incumbent)	1,566	100.00%
Total votes		1,566	100.00%

Republican primary results
Party	Candidate	Votes	%
Republican	Jesse R. "Russ" Gleason	1,001	100.00%
Total votes		1,001	100.00%

General election results
Party	Candidate	Votes	%
Democratic	Rex Manuel (incumbent)	2,323	55.88%
Republican	Jesse R. "Russ" Gleason	1,834	44.12%
Total votes		4,157	100.00%
Democratic hold			

=== District 12 ===
Democratic primary results
Party	Candidate	Votes	%
Democratic	Dean A. Hellinger	1,221	100.00%
Total votes		1,221	100.00%

Republican primary results
Party	Candidate	Votes	%
Republican	Melvin Underdal (incumbent)	930	100.00%
Total votes		930	100.00%

General election results
Party	Candidate	Votes	%
Republican	Melvin Underdal (incumbent)	2,093	54.36%
Democratic	Dean A. Hellinger	1,757	45.64%
Total votes		3,850	100.00%
Republican hold			

=== District 13 ===
Democratic primary results
Party	Candidate	Votes	%
Democratic	Glenn A. Roush	700	51.28%
Democratic	George R. Johnston (incumbent)	665	48.72%
Total votes		1,365	100.00%

Republican primary results
Party	Candidate	Votes	%
Republican	Barney Reagan	321	100.00%
Total votes		321	100.00%

General election results
Party	Candidate	Votes	%
Democratic	Glenn A. Roush	1,762	55.55%
Republican	Barney Reagan	1,410	44.45%
Total votes		3,172	100.00%
Democratic hold			

=== District 14 ===
Democratic primary results
Party	Candidate	Votes	%
Democratic	Roland F. Kennerly	698	58.17%
Democratic	Clinton R. "Rayne" Pilgeram	502	41.83%
Total votes		1,200	100.00%

Republican primary results
Party	Candidate	Votes	%
Republican	Harriet Hayne (incumbent)	371	100.00%
Total votes		371	100.00%

General election results
Party	Candidate	Votes	%
Democratic	Roland F. Kennerly	1,274	51.94%
Republican	Harriet Hayne (incumbent)	1,179	48.06%
Total votes		2,453	100.00%
Democratic gain from Republican			

=== District 15 ===
Democratic primary results
Party	Candidate	Votes	%
Democratic	Mary Ellen Connelly	611	51.04%
Democratic	Russell Baeth	586	48.96%
Total votes		1,197	100.00%

Republican primary results
Party	Candidate	Votes	%
Republican	Gary W. Bennett	499	100.00%
Total votes		499	100.00%

General election results
Party	Candidate	Votes	%
Republican	Gary W. Bennett	1,658	45.59%
Democratic	Mary Ellen Connelly	1,653	45.45%
Libertarian	Jeff Ross	326	8.96%
Total votes		3,637	100.00%
Republican hold			

=== District 16 ===
Democratic primary results
Party	Candidate	Votes	%
Democratic	Ray Lybeck	1,038	100.00%
Total votes		1,038	100.00%

Republican primary results
Party	Candidate	Votes	%
Republican	Robert Lewis Anderson (incumbent)	1,150	100.00%
Total votes		1,150	100.00%

General election results
Party	Candidate	Votes	%
Republican	Robert Lewis Anderson (incumbent)	2,751	55.45%
Democratic	Ray Lybeck	2,210	44.55%
Total votes		4,961	100.00%
Republican hold			

=== District 17 ===
Democratic primary results
Party	Candidate	Votes	%
Democratic	Jack Brian Uhde (incumbent) (Note: Although Jack Brian Uhde won the primary, Richard J. "Rick" Champoux was the Democratic nominee in the general election.)	941	100.00%
Total votes		941	100.00%

Republican primary results
Party	Candidate	Votes	%
Republican	Alison R. Conn	969	100.00%
Total votes		969	100.00%

General election results
Party	Candidate	Votes	%
Republican	Alison R. Conn	2,556	60.48%
Democratic	Richard J. "Rick" Champoux	1,670	39.52%
Total votes		4,226	100.00%
Republican gain from Democratic			

=== District 18 ===
Democratic primary results
Party	Candidate	Votes	%
Democratic	Michael H. Keedy (incumbent)	926	100.00%
Total votes		926	100.00%

Republican primary results
Party	Candidate	Votes	%
Republican	Sterling Rygg	1,041	100.00%
Total votes		1,041	100.00%

General election results
Party	Candidate	Votes	%
Democratic	Michael H. Keedy (incumbent)	2,204	52.25%
Republican	Sterling Rygg	2,014	47.75%
Total votes		4,218	100.00%
Democratic hold			

=== District 19 ===
Democratic primary results
Party	Candidate	Votes	%
Democratic	Pat Gesek (incumbent)	994	100.00%
Total votes		994	100.00%

Republican primary results
Party	Candidate	Votes	%
Republican	John G. Harp	509	51.31%
Republican	Clyde A. Turner	307	30.95%
Republican	Garrick "Gary" Hansen	176	17.74%
Total votes		992	100.00%

General election results
Party	Candidate	Votes	%
Republican	John G. Harp	2,861	65.63%
Democratic	Pat Gesek (incumbent)	1,498	34.37%
Total votes		4,359	100.00%
Republican gain from Democratic			

=== District 20 ===
Democratic primary results
Party	Candidate	Votes	%
Democratic	Jerry M. Syth	745	100.00%
Total votes		745	100.00%

Republican primary results
Party	Candidate	Votes	%
Republican	Aubyn A. Curtiss (incumbent)	665	100.00%
Total votes		665	100.00%

General election results
Party	Candidate	Votes	%
Republican	Aubyn A. Curtiss (incumbent)	2,520	70.04%
Democratic	Jerry M. Syth	1,078	29.96%
Total votes		3,598	100.00%
Republican hold			

=== District 21 ===
Democratic primary results
Party	Candidate	Votes	%
Democratic	William R. "Bill" Baeth (incumbent)	1,044	70.83%
Democratic	Jim Challinor	430	29.17%
Total votes		1,474	100.00%

Republican primary results
Party	Candidate	Votes	%
Republican	Glenn H. Mueller	294	100.00%
Total votes		294	100.00%

General election results
Party	Candidate	Votes	%
Republican	Glenn H. Mueller	1,606	58.15%
Democratic	William R. "Bill" Baeth (incumbent)	1,156	41.85%
Total votes		2,762	100.00%
Republican gain from Democratic			

=== District 22 ===
Democratic primary results
Party	Candidate	Votes	%
Democratic	Arthur H. "Art" Shelden (incumbent)	607	40.57%
Democratic	Bob Case	580	38.77%
Democratic	June Schultz	309	20.66%
Total votes		1,496	100.00%

General election results
Party	Candidate	Votes	%
Democratic	Arthur H. "Art" Shelden (incumbent)	1,700	59.15%
Libertarian	Michael J. Tanchek	1,174	40.85%
Total votes		2,874	100.00%
Democratic hold			

=== District 23 ===
Democratic primary results
Party	Candidate	Votes	%
Democratic	Barton O. Wetzel	845	100.00%
Total votes		845	100.00%

Republican primary results
Party	Candidate	Votes	%
Republican	Chris H. Stobie (incumbent)	1,086	100.00%
Total votes		1,086	100.00%

General election results
Party	Candidate	Votes	%
Republican	Chris H. Stobie (incumbent)	2,688	68.69%
Democratic	Barton O. Wetzel	1,225	31.31%
Total votes		3,913	100.00%
Republican hold			

=== District 24 ===
Democratic primary results
Party	Candidate	Votes	%
Democratic	Tim Cole	1,465	100.00%
Total votes		1,465	100.00%

Republican primary results
Party	Candidate	Votes	%
Republican	Aaron W. Andreason	660	100.00%
Total votes		660	100.00%

General election results
Party	Candidate	Votes	%
Republican	Aaron W. Andreason	2,305	50.31%
Democratic	Tim Cole	2,277	49.69%
Total votes		4,582	100.00%
Republican gain from Democratic			

=== District 25 ===
Democratic primary results
Party	Candidate	Votes	%
Democratic	Michael J. "Mike" Fisher	953	100.00%
Total votes		953	100.00%

Republican primary results
Party	Candidate	Votes	%
Republican	William Ray Jensen (incumbent)	424	48.68%
Republican	Wally Sims	249	28.59%
Republican	David M. Leahy	198	22.73%
Total votes		871	100.00%

General election results
Party	Candidate	Votes	%
Republican	William Ray Jensen (incumbent)	1,847	51.68%
Democratic	Michael J. "Mike" Fisher	1,727	48.32%
Total votes		3,574	100.00%
Republican hold			

=== District 26 ===
Democratic primary results
Party	Candidate	Votes	%
Democratic	Mac Schaffer	694	56.38%
Democratic	James E. Taplin	537	43.62%
Total votes		1,231	100.00%

Republican primary results
Party	Candidate	Votes	%
Republican	Carl A. Seifert (incumbent)	1,116	76.70%
Republican	Elizabeth D. Brueckmann	339	23.30%
Total votes		1,455	100.00%

General election results
Party	Candidate	Votes	%
Republican	Carl A. Seifert (incumbent)	2,695	57.75%
Democratic	Mac Schaffer	1,972	42.25%
Total votes		4,667	100.00%
Republican hold			

=== District 27 ===
Democratic primary results
Party	Candidate	Votes	%
Democratic	Don A. McKee	1,226	100.00%
Total votes		1,226	100.00%

Republican primary results
Party	Candidate	Votes	%
Republican	Verner L. Bertelsen (incumbent)	924	100.00%
Total votes		924	100.00%

General election results
Party	Candidate	Votes	%
Republican	Verner L. Bertelsen (incumbent)	2,044	51.87%
Democratic	Don A. McKee	1,897	48.13%
Total votes		3,941	100.00%
Republican hold			

=== District 28 ===
Democratic primary results
Party	Candidate	Votes	%
Democratic	Joe Brand (incumbent)	1,015	100.00%
Total votes		1,015	100.00%

General election results
Party	Candidate	Votes	%
Democratic	Joe Brand (incumbent)	2,196	100.00%
Total votes		2,196	100.00%
Democratic hold			

=== District 29 ===
Democratic primary results
Party	Candidate	Votes	%
Democratic	Stephen H. Meloy	1,273	59.85%
Democratic	Donald D. Maclntyre	502	23.60%
Democratic	Will Garvin	352	16.55%
Total votes		2,127	100.00%

Republican primary results
Party	Candidate	Votes	%
Republican	Gene Donaldson (incumbent)	655	100.00%
Total votes		655	100.00%

General election results
Party	Candidate	Votes	%
Republican	Gene Donaldson (incumbent)	3,196	57.39%
Democratic	Stephen H. Meloy	2,373	42.61%
Total votes		5,569	100.00%
Republican hold			

=== District 30 ===
Democratic primary results
Party	Candidate	Votes	%
Democratic	Hal Harper (incumbent)	1,323	100.00%
Total votes		1,323	100.00%

Republican primary results
Party	Candidate	Votes	%
Republican	Maynard A. Olson	542	75.91%
Republican	Bill Walker	172	24.09%
Total votes		714	100.00%

General election results
Party	Candidate	Votes	%
Democratic	Hal Harper (incumbent)	2,285	54.70%
Republican	Maynard A. Olson	1,892	45.30%
Total votes		4,177	100.00%
Democratic hold			

=== District 31 ===
Democratic primary results
Party	Candidate	Votes	%
Democratic	Jerry Metcalf (incumbent)	908	100.00%
Total votes		908	100.00%

Republican primary results
Party	Candidate	Votes	%
Republican	Thomas "Tom" Meagher	195	56.85%
Republican	Wayne Phillips	148	43.15%
Total votes		343	100.00%

General election results
Party	Candidate	Votes	%
Democratic	Jerry Metcalf (incumbent)	1,618	55.51%
Republican	Thomas "Tom" Meagher	1,297	44.49%
Total votes		2,915	100.00%
Democratic hold			

=== District 32 ===
Democratic primary results
Party	Candidate	Votes	%
Democratic	Bruce Loble	855	51.94%
Democratic	David A. Curry	791	48.06%
Total votes		1,646	100.00%

Republican primary results
Party	Candidate	Votes	%
Republican	Barbara J. "Bobby" Spilker (incumbent)	553	100.00%
Total votes		553	100.00%

General election results
Party	Candidate	Votes	%
Republican	Barbara J. "Bobby" Spilker (incumbent)	2,435	56.39%
Democratic	Bruce Loble	1,883	43.61%
Total votes		4,318	100.00%
Republican hold			

=== District 33 ===
Democratic primary results
Party	Candidate	Votes	%
Democratic	Ted Neuman	734	43.41%
Democratic	John B. Staigmiller (incumbent)	483	28.56%
Democratic	Tag Rittel	474	28.03%
Total votes		1,691	100.00%

Republican primary results
Party	Candidate	Votes	%
Republican	John Cobb	376	100.00%
Total votes		376	100.00%

General election results
Party	Candidate	Votes	%
Democratic	Ted Neuman	1,750	50.11%
Republican	John Cobb	1,742	49.89%
Total votes		3,492	100.00%
Democratic hold			

=== District 34 ===
Democratic primary results
Party	Candidate	Votes	%
Democratic	Helen G. O'Connell (incumbent)	760	100.00%
Total votes		760	100.00%

General election results
Party	Candidate	Votes	%
Democratic	Helen G. O'Connell (incumbent)	1,952	100.00%
Total votes		1,952	100.00%
Democratic hold			

=== District 35 ===
Democratic primary results
Party	Candidate	Votes	%
Democratic	Richard E. "Dick" Manning (incumbent)	679	100.00%
Total votes		679	100.00%

Republican primary results
Party	Candidate	Votes	%
Republican	Warren O'Keefe	201	100.00%
Total votes		201	100.00%

General election results
Party	Candidate	Votes	%
Democratic	Richard E. "Dick" Manning (incumbent)	1,255	51.50%
Republican	Warren O'Keefe	1,182	48.50%
Total votes		2,437	100.00%
Democratic hold			

=== District 36 ===
Democratic primary results
Party	Candidate	Votes	%
Democratic	Gerald D. Nisbet	424	38.13%
Democratic	P. J. Gilfeather	419	37.68%
Democratic	William D. Ryan	269	24.19%
Total votes		1,112	100.00%

Republican primary results
Party	Candidate	Votes	%
Republican	Toni Bergene	315	63.77%
Republican	Mary England	179	36.23%
Total votes		494	100.00%

General election results
Party	Candidate	Votes	%
Republican	Toni Bergene	1,563	52.36%
Democratic	Gerald D. Nisbet	1,422	47.64%
Total votes		2,985	100.00%
Republican gain from Democratic			

=== District 37 ===
Democratic primary results
Party	Candidate	Votes	%
Democratic	L. H. "Les" Nilson	396	100.00%
Total votes		396	100.00%

General election results
Party	Candidate	Votes	%
Democratic	L. H. "Les" Nilson	1,095	100.00%
Total votes		1,095	100.00%
Democratic hold			

=== District 38 ===
Democratic primary results
Party	Candidate	Votes	%
Democratic	Lloyd J. "Mac" McCormick	606	100.00%
Total votes		606	100.00%

Republican primary results
Party	Candidate	Votes	%
Republican	John G. Matsko	201	100.00%
Total votes		201	100.00%

General election results
Party	Candidate	Votes	%
Republican	John G. Matsko	1,144	51.44%
Democratic	Lloyd J. "Mac" McCormick	1,080	48.56%
Total votes		2,224	100.00%
Republican gain from Democratic			

=== District 39 ===
Democratic primary results
Party	Candidate	Votes	%
Democratic	Paul G. Pistoria (incumbent)	493	100.00%
Total votes		493	100.00%

Republican primary results
Party	Candidate	Votes	%
Republican	L. A. "Andy" Andersen	215	100.00%
Total votes		215	100.00%

General election results
Party	Candidate	Votes	%
Democratic	Paul G. Pistoria (incumbent)	1,018	48.25%
Republican	L. A. "Andy" Andersen	861	40.81%
Libertarian	Charles N. Steele	231	10.95%
Total votes		2,110	100.00%
Democratic hold			

=== District 40 ===
Democratic primary results
Party	Candidate	Votes	%
Democratic	William H. "Bill" Artz	724	100.00%
Total votes		724	100.00%

Republican primary results
Party	Candidate	Votes	%
Republican	Andrea "Andy" Hemstad (incumbent)	404	100.00%
Total votes		404	100.00%

General election results
Party	Candidate	Votes	%
Republican	Andrea "Andy" Hemstad (incumbent)	1,877	65.56%
Democratic	William H. "Bill" Artz	986	34.44%
Total votes		2,863	100.00%
Republican hold			

=== District 41 ===
Democratic primary results
Party	Candidate	Votes	%
Democratic	Douglas C. Allen	519	100.00%
Total votes		519	100.00%

Republican primary results
Party	Candidate	Votes	%
Republican	Jack K. Moore (incumbent)	364	100.00%
Total votes		364	100.00%

General election results
Party	Candidate	Votes	%
Republican	Jack K. Moore (incumbent)	1,408	47.97%
Democratic	Douglas C. Allen	1,278	43.54%
Libertarian	William D. Jacobsen	249	8.48%
Total votes		2,935	100.00%
Republican hold			

=== District 42 ===
Democratic primary results
Party	Candidate	Votes	%
Democratic	Peter M. Miller	425	100.00%
Total votes		425	100.00%

Republican primary results
Party	Candidate	Votes	%
Republican	Darryl Meyer (incumbent)	288	100.00%
Total votes		288	100.00%

General election results
Party	Candidate	Votes	%
Republican	Darryl Meyer (incumbent)	1,478	61.25%
Democratic	Peter M. Miller	935	38.75%
Total votes		2,413	100.00%
Republican hold			

=== District 43 ===
Democratic primary results
Party	Candidate	Votes	%
Democratic	Geraldine W. Travis	20	76.92%
Democratic	Walter L. Carnathan	4	15.38%
Democratic	Peter Gallogly	2	7.69%
Total votes		26	100.00%

Republican primary results
Party	Candidate	Votes	%
Republican	John E. Phillips	21	100.00%
Total votes		21	100.00%

General election results
Party	Candidate	Votes	%
Republican	John E. Phillips	133	63.33%
Democratic	Geraldine W. Travis	77	36.67%
Total votes		210	100.00%
Republican gain from Democratic			

=== District 44 ===
Democratic primary results
Party	Candidate	Votes	%
Democratic	Rich Pavlonnis	629	100.00%
Total votes		629	100.00%

Republican primary results
Party	Candidate	Votes	%
Republican	W. Jay Fabrega (incumbent)	533	100.00%
Total votes		533	100.00%

General election results
Party	Candidate	Votes	%
Republican	W. Jay Fabrega (incumbent)	2,116	65.39%
Democratic	Rich Pavlonnis	1,120	34.61%
Total votes		3,236	100.00%
Republican hold			

=== District 45 ===
Republican primary results
Party	Candidate	Votes	%
Republican	Burt L. Hurwitz (incumbent)	758	100.00%
Total votes		758	100.00%

General election results
Party	Candidate	Votes	%
Republican	Burt L. Hurwitz (incumbent)	2,640	100.00%
Total votes		2,640	100.00%
Republican hold			

=== District 46 ===
Democratic primary results
Party	Candidate	Votes	%
Democratic	Gay Holliday	1,200	100.00%
Total votes		1,200	100.00%

Republican primary results
Party	Candidate	Votes	%
Republican	M. Darrell Brewer	654	55.80%
Republican	Bill Jones	518	44.20%
Total votes		1,172	100.00%

General election results
Party	Candidate	Votes	%
Democratic	Gay Holliday	2,139	54.62%
Republican	M. Darrell Brewer	1,777	45.38%
Total votes		3,916	100.00%
Democratic hold			

=== District 47 ===
Republican primary results
Party	Candidate	Votes	%
Republican	Gene N. Ernst (incumbent)	1,055	100.00%
Total votes		1,055	100.00%

General election results
Party	Candidate	Votes	%
Republican	Gene N. Ernst (incumbent)	3,394	100.00%
Total votes		3,394	100.00%
Republican hold			

=== District 48 ===
Republican primary results
Party	Candidate	Votes	%
Republican	James M. Schultz (incumbent)	1,190	100.00%
Total votes		1,190	100.00%

General election results
Party	Candidate	Votes	%
Republican	James M. Schultz (incumbent)	3,318	100.00%
Total votes		3,318	100.00%
Republican hold			

=== District 49 ===
Democratic primary results
Party	Candidate	Votes	%
Democratic	Thomas Breitbach	825	100.00%
Total votes		825	100.00%

Republican primary results
Party	Candidate	Votes	%
Republican	John A. Ryan	810	100.00%
Total votes		810	100.00%

General election results
Party	Candidate	Votes	%
Republican	John A. Ryan	2,185	66.60%
Democratic	Thomas Breitbach	1,096	33.40%
Total votes		3,281	100.00%
Republican gain from Democratic			

=== District 50 ===
Democratic primary results
Party	Candidate	Votes	%
Democratic	Gene H. Kurtz	876	100.00%
Total votes		876	100.00%

Republican primary results
Party	Candidate	Votes	%
Republican	Tom Asay	613	65.91%
Republican	Michael J. "J. Mike" Dorris	317	34.09%
Total votes		930	100.00%

General election results
Party	Candidate	Votes	%
Republican	Tom Asay	2,456	62.57%
Democratic	Gene H. Kurtz	1,469	37.43%
Total votes		3,925	100.00%
Republican gain from Democratic			

=== District 51 ===
Democratic primary results
Party	Candidate	Votes	%
Democratic	G. Michael Reynolds (Note: Although G. Michael Reynolds won the primary, Carl J. Zabrocki was the nominee in the general election.)	548	62.56%
Democratic	Charles H. Bastian	328	37.44%
Total votes		876	100.00%

Republican primary results
Party	Candidate	Votes	%
Republican	W. Boyce Clarke	478	100.00%
Total votes		478	100.00%

General election results
Party	Candidate	Votes	%
Democratic	Carl J. Zabrocki	1,508	51.33%
Republican	W. Boyce Clarke	1,430	48.67%
Total votes		2,938	100.00%
Democratic hold			

=== District 52 ===
Democratic primary results
Party	Candidate	Votes	%
Democratic	Les J. Hirsch (incumbent)	979	100.00%
Total votes		979	100.00%

Republican primary results
Party	Candidate	Votes	%
Republican	Michael G. "Gerry" Devlin	1,066	100.00%
Total votes		1,066	100.00%

General election results
Party	Candidate	Votes	%
Republican	Michael G. "Gerry" Devlin	2,021	51.16%
Democratic	Les J. Hirsch (incumbent)	1,929	48.84%
Total votes		3,950	100.00%
Republican gain from Democratic			

=== District 53 ===
Democratic primary results
Party	Candidate	Votes	%
Democratic	John M. Shontz	574	100.00%
Total votes		574	100.00%

Republican primary results
Party	Candidate	Votes	%
Republican	Blane M. Riggins	539	100.00%
Total votes		539	100.00%

General election results
Party	Candidate	Votes	%
Democratic	John M. Shontz	1,340	38.75%
Independent	G. Kay Carpenter	1,144	33.08%
Republican	Blane M. Riggins	974	28.17%
Total votes		3,458	100.00%
Democratic gain from Republican			

=== District 54 ===
Democratic primary results
Party	Candidate	Votes	%
Democratic	Jerry Redlin	979	100.00%
Total votes		979	100.00%

Republican primary results
Party	Candidate	Votes	%
Republican	L. Dean Switzer	507	75.45%
Republican	Milton W. Mandigo	165	24.55%
Total votes		672	100.00%

General election results
Party	Candidate	Votes	%
Republican	L. Dean Switzer	2,308	61.09%
Democratic	Jerry Redlin	1,470	38.91%
Total votes		3,778	100.00%
Republican gain from Democratic			

=== District 55 ===
Democratic primary results
Party	Candidate	Votes	%
Democratic	Marjorie Hart	855	100.00%
Total votes		855	100.00%

Republican primary results
Party	Candidate	Votes	%
Republican	L. E. "Gene" Wood (incumbent)	543	100.00%
Total votes		543	100.00%

General election results
Party	Candidate	Votes	%
Democratic	Marjorie Hart	1,552	54.61%
Republican	L. E. "Gene" Wood (incumbent)	1,290	45.39%
Total votes		2,842	100.00%
Democratic gain from Republican			

=== District 56 ===
Democratic primary results
Party	Candidate	Votes	%
Democratic	Hubert J. Abrams	992	100.00%
Total votes		992	100.00%

Republican primary results
Party	Candidate	Votes	%
Republican	Harold A. Wyrick (incumbent)	518	61.08%
Republican	Evelyn E. Hoem	330	38.92%
Total votes		848	100.00%

General election results
Party	Candidate	Votes	%
Democratic	Hubert J. Abrams	1,793	55.12%
Republican	Harold A. Wyrick (incumbent)	1,460	44.88%
Total votes		3,253	100.00%
Democratic gain from Republican			

=== District 57 ===
Democratic primary results
Party	Candidate	Votes	%
Democratic	Milton L. Amsden	502	100.00%
Total votes		502	100.00%

Republican primary results
Party	Candidate	Votes	%
Republican	Carl M. Smith (incumbent)	870	100.00%
Total votes		870	100.00%

General election results
Party	Candidate	Votes	%
Republican	Carl M. Smith (incumbent)	1,414	53.28%
Democratic	Milton L. Amsden	1,240	46.72%
Total votes		2,654	100.00%
Republican hold			

=== District 58 ===
Democratic primary results
Party	Candidate	Votes	%
Democratic	Thomas R. Conroy (incumbent)	851	100.00%
Total votes		851	100.00%

General election results
Party	Candidate	Votes	%
Democratic	Thomas R. Conroy (incumbent)	2,174	100.00%
Total votes		2,174	100.00%
Democratic hold			

=== District 59 ===
Democratic primary results
Party	Candidate	Votes	%
Democratic	Esther G. Bengtson (incumbent)	859	100.00%
Total votes		859	100.00%

Republican primary results
Party	Candidate	Votes	%
Republican	Tim Wittman	570	57.52%
Republican	Betty L. Ard	421	42.48%
Total votes		991	100.00%

General election results
Party	Candidate	Votes	%
Democratic	Esther G. Bengtson (incumbent)	2,261	52.13%
Republican	Tim Wittman	2,076	47.87%
Total votes		4,337	100.00%
Democratic hold			

=== District 60 ===
Democratic primary results
Party	Candidate	Votes	%
Democratic	Gerald T. Dunbar	680	63.85%
Democratic	Steve Trenka	385	36.15%
Total votes		1,065	100.00%

Republican primary results
Party	Candidate	Votes	%
Republican	Les Kitselman	854	100.00%
Total votes		854	100.00%

General election results
Party	Candidate	Votes	%
Republican	Les Kitselman	3,312	58.41%
Democratic	Gerald T. Dunbar	2,358	41.59%
Total votes		5,670	100.00%
Republican gain from Democratic			

=== District 61 ===
Democratic primary results
Party	Candidate	Votes	%
Democratic	Robert Dozier (incumbent)	418	100.00%
Total votes		418	100.00%

Republican primary results
Party	Candidate	Votes	%
Republican	Nathaniel W. Morris	247	100.00%
Total votes		247	100.00%

General election results
Party	Candidate	Votes	%
Democratic	Robert Dozier (incumbent)	1,047	54.33%
Republican	Nathaniel W. Morris	880	45.67%
Total votes		1,927	100.00%
Democratic hold			

=== District 62 ===
Democratic primary results
Party	Candidate	Votes	%
Democratic	Harold E. Gerke (incumbent)	479	100.00%
Total votes		479	100.00%

Republican primary results
Party	Candidate	Votes	%
Republican	David A. O'Hara	241	54.16%
Republican	Robert L. "Rob" Stephens Jr.	108	24.27%
Republican	Craig Degenhardt	96	21.57%
Total votes		445	100.00%

General election results
Party	Candidate	Votes	%
Republican	David A. O'Hara	1,250	56.56%
Democratic	Harold E. Gerke (incumbent)	960	43.44%
Total votes		2,210	100.00%
Republican gain from Democratic			

=== District 63 ===
Democratic primary results
Party	Candidate	Votes	%
Democratic	Edward M. "Ed" Dobson	364	100.00%
Total votes		364	100.00%

Republican primary results
Party	Candidate	Votes	%
Republican	Harrison G. Fagg (incumbent)	761	100.00%
Total votes		761	100.00%

General election results
Party	Candidate	Votes	%
Republican	Harrison G. Fagg (incumbent)	2,030	63.66%
Democratic	Edward M. "Ed" Dobson	1,159	36.34%
Total votes		3,189	100.00%
Republican hold			

=== District 64 ===
Democratic primary results
Party	Candidate	Votes	%
Democratic	Rodney L. Garcia	448	100.00%
Total votes		448	100.00%

Republican primary results
Party	Candidate	Votes	%
Republican	Chuck Cozzens	1,045	42.32%
Republican	Gerald A. Franz	1,043	42.24%
Republican	Lou Aleksich	381	15.43%
Total votes		2,469	100.00%

General election results
Party	Candidate	Votes	%
Republican	Chuck Cozzens	4,228	79.21%
Democratic	Rodney L. Garcia	1,110	20.79%
Total votes		5,338	100.00%
Republican hold			

=== District 65 ===
Democratic primary results
Party	Candidate	Votes	%
Democratic	Ray E. Blehm Jr.	470	100.00%
Total votes		470	100.00%

Republican primary results
Party	Candidate	Votes	%
Republican	Calvin Winslow	871	100.00%
Total votes		871	100.00%

General election results
Party	Candidate	Votes	%
Republican	Calvin Winslow	2,354	71.07%
Democratic	Ray E. Blehm Jr.	958	28.93%
Total votes		3,312	100.00%
Republican hold			

=== District 66 ===
Democratic primary results
Party	Candidate	Votes	%
Democratic	Gerald R. Kessler (incumbent)	593	100.00%
Total votes		593	100.00%

Republican primary results
Party	Candidate	Votes	%
Republican	Crisman "Cris" Erekson	518	100.00%
Total votes		518	100.00%

General election results
Party	Candidate	Votes	%
Democratic	Gerald R. Kessler (incumbent)	1,580	50.93%
Republican	Crisman "Cris" Erekson	1,522	49.07%
Total votes		3,102	100.00%
Democratic hold			

=== District 67 ===
Democratic primary results
Party	Candidate	Votes	%
Democratic	Donna Small	611	100.00%
Total votes		611	100.00%

Republican primary results
Party	Candidate	Votes	%
Republican	Tom Hannah	569	100.00%
Total votes		569	100.00%

General election results
Party	Candidate	Votes	%
Republican	Tom Hannah	2,029	55.73%
Democratic	Donna Small	1,612	44.27%
Total votes		3,641	100.00%
Republican gain from Democratic			

=== District 68 ===
Democratic primary results
Party	Candidate	Votes	%
Democratic	Herb Huennekens (incumbent)	677	100.00%
Total votes		677	100.00%

Republican primary results
Party	Candidate	Votes	%
Republican	Jack L. Perkins	597	100.00%
Total votes		597	100.00%

General election results
Party	Candidate	Votes	%
Democratic	Herb Huennekens (incumbent)	2,028	60.56%
Republican	Jack L. Perkins	1,321	39.44%
Total votes		3,349	100.00%
Democratic hold			

=== District 69 ===
Democratic primary results
Party	Candidate	Votes	%
Democratic	Wes Teague (incumbent)	512	100.00%
Total votes		512	100.00%

Republican primary results
Party	Candidate	Votes	%
Republican	Vernon C. Bynum	320	100.00%
Total votes		320	100.00%

General election results
Party	Candidate	Votes	%
Democratic	Wes Teague (incumbent)	1,437	55.38%
Republican	Vernon C. Bynum	1,158	44.62%
Total votes		2,595	100.00%
Democratic hold			

=== District 70 ===
Democratic primary results
Party	Candidate	Votes	%
Democratic	J. Melvin "Mel" Williams (incumbent)	969	100.00%
Total votes		969	100.00%

Republican primary results
Party	Candidate	Votes	%
Republican	Terence J. Keating	771	100.00%
Total votes		771	100.00%

General election results
Party	Candidate	Votes	%
Democratic	J. Melvin "Mel" Williams (incumbent)	2,241	52.61%
Republican	Terence J. Keating	2,019	47.39%
Total votes		4,260	100.00%
Democratic hold			

=== District 71 ===
Democratic primary results
Party	Candidate	Votes	%
Democratic	Gary Spaeth	1,196	60.40%
Democratic	Dwight E. McCarty	784	39.60%
Total votes		1,980	100.00%

Republican primary results
Party	Candidate	Votes	%
Republican	James H. "Jim" Burnett (incumbent)	748	100.00%
Total votes		748	100.00%

General election results
Party	Candidate	Votes	%
Republican	James H. "Jim" Burnett (incumbent)	2,272	53.13%
Democratic	Gary Spaeth	2,004	46.87%
Total votes		4,276	100.00%
Republican hold			

=== District 72 ===
Democratic primary results
Party	Candidate	Votes	%
Democratic	Vicki Johnson Hyatt (incumbent)	1,178	100.00%
Total votes		1,178	100.00%

Republican primary results
Party	Candidate	Votes	%
Republican	Jean McLane	1,058	100.00%
Total votes		1,058	100.00%

General election results
Party	Candidate	Votes	%
Republican	Jean McLane	2,542	53.66%
Democratic	Vicki Johnson Hyatt (incumbent)	2,195	46.34%
Total votes		4,737	100.00%
Republican gain from Democratic			

=== District 73 ===
Republican primary results
Party	Candidate	Votes	%
Republican	Orval S. Ellison (incumbent)	1,657	100.00%
Total votes		1,657	100.00%

General election results
Party	Candidate	Votes	%
Republican	Orval S. Ellison (incumbent)	3,804	100.00%
Total votes		3,804	100.00%
Republican hold			

=== District 74 ===
Democratic primary results
Party	Candidate	Votes	%
Democratic	Dan Yardley (incumbent)	614	56.59%
Democratic	Bob Raney	471	43.41%
Total votes		1,085	100.00%

Republican primary results
Party	Candidate	Votes	%
Republican	George Ommundsen	589	60.16%
Republican	Warren W. Harper Sr.	390	39.84%
Total votes		979	100.00%

General election results
Party	Candidate	Votes	%
Democratic	Dan Yardley (incumbent)	1,916	54.68%
Republican	George Ommundsen	1,588	45.32%
Total votes		3,504	100.00%
Democratic hold			

=== District 75 ===
Democratic primary results
Party	Candidate	Votes	%
Democratic	Harold L. Baier	721	100.00%
Total votes		721	100.00%

Republican primary results
Party	Candidate	Votes	%
Republican	Robert A. Ellerd (incumbent)	1,318	100.00%
Total votes		1,318	100.00%

General election results
Party	Candidate	Votes	%
Republican	Robert A. Ellerd (incumbent)	3,379	59.20%
Democratic	Harold L. Baier	2,329	40.80%
Total votes		5,708	100.00%
Republican hold			

=== District 76 ===
Democratic primary results
Party	Candidate	Votes	%
Democratic	John P. Scully (incumbent)	803	100.00%
Total votes		803	100.00%

Republican primary results
Party	Candidate	Votes	%
Republican	Norm Wallin	671	100.00%
Total votes		671	100.00%

General election results
Party	Candidate	Votes	%
Republican	Norm Wallin	2,674	57.01%
Democratic	John P. Scully (incumbent)	2,016	42.99%
Total votes		4,690	100.00%
Republican gain from Democratic			

=== District 77 ===
Democratic primary results
Party	Candidate	Votes	%
Democratic	Marilyn Wessel	602	100.00%
Total votes		602	100.00%

Republican primary results
Party	Candidate	Votes	%
Republican	Kenneth Nordtvedt (incumbent)	528	100.00%
Total votes		528	100.00%

General election results
Party	Candidate	Votes	%
Republican	Kenneth Nordtvedt (incumbent)	1,967	59.82%
Democratic	Marilyn Wessel	1,321	40.18%
Total votes		3,288	100.00%
Republican hold			

=== District 78 ===
Democratic primary results
Party	Candidate	Votes	%
Democratic	John Vincent (incumbent)	814	100.00%
Total votes		814	100.00%

Republican primary results
Party	Candidate	Votes	%
Republican	James W. "Jim" Vollmer	565	100.00%
Total votes		565	100.00%

General election results
Party	Candidate	Votes	%
Democratic	John Vincent (incumbent)	2,187	67.48%
Republican	James W. "Jim" Vollmer	1,054	32.52%
Total votes		3,241	100.00%
Democratic hold			

=== District 79 ===
Democratic primary results
Party	Candidate	Votes	%
Democratic	Jennie Andriolo	854	100.00%
Total votes		854	100.00%

Republican primary results
Party	Candidate	Votes	%
Republican	Walter R. Sales (incumbent)	956	100.00%
Total votes		956	100.00%

General election results
Party	Candidate	Votes	%
Republican	Walter R. Sales (incumbent)	2,955	64.14%
Democratic	Jennie Andriolo	1,652	35.86%
Total votes		4,607	100.00%
Republican hold			

=== District 80 ===
Democratic primary results
Party	Candidate	Votes	%
Democratic	Paul A. Bessler	1,587	100.00%
Total votes		1,587	100.00%

Republican primary results
Party	Candidate	Votes	%
Republican	Robert L. "Bob" Marks (incumbent)	818	100.00%
Total votes		818	100.00%

General election results
Party	Candidate	Votes	%
Republican	Robert L. "Bob" Marks (incumbent)	2,900	59.04%
Democratic	Paul A. Bessler	2,012	40.96%
Total votes		4,912	100.00%
Republican hold			

=== District 81 ===
Republican primary results
Party	Candidate	Votes	%
Republican	Kerry Keyser (incumbent)	1,563	100.00%
Total votes		1,563	100.00%

General election results
Party	Candidate	Votes	%
Republican	Kerry Keyser (incumbent)	3,446	100.00%
Total votes		3,446	100.00%
Republican hold			

=== District 82 ===
Democratic primary results
Party	Candidate	Votes	%
Democratic	D. Keith Gosnell	846	100.00%
Total votes		846	100.00%

Republican primary results
Party	Candidate	Votes	%
Republican	G. H. "Harold" Briggs	469	62.95%
Republican	Joe Womack	276	37.05%
Total votes		745	100.00%

General election results
Party	Candidate	Votes	%
Republican	G. H. "Harold" Briggs	1,276	42.45%
Democratic	Bill Hand (incumbent) (Note: The candidate ran a write-in campaign in this election.)	889	29.57%
Democratic	D. Keith Gosnell	841	27.98%
Total votes		3,006	100.00%
Republican gain from Democratic			

=== District 83 ===
Democratic primary results
Party	Candidate	Votes	%
Democratic	Dave Brown	1,148	37.13%
Democratic	Chuck Boyle	946	30.60%
Democratic	Gordon M. Tracy	537	17.37%
Democratic	Garry L. Preston	461	14.91%
Total votes		3,092	100.00%

General election results
Party	Candidate	Votes	%
Democratic	Dave Brown	2,972	100.00%
Total votes		2,972	100.00%
Democratic hold			

=== District 84 ===
Democratic primary results
Party	Candidate	Votes	%
Democratic	Joe Quilici (incumbent)	1,472	100.00%
Total votes		1,472	100.00%

General election results
Party	Candidate	Votes	%
Democratic	Joe Quilici (incumbent)	2,244	100.00%
Total votes		2,244	100.00%
Democratic hold			

=== District 85 ===
Democratic primary results
Party	Candidate	Votes	%
Democratic	Kathleen McBride (incumbent)	1,280	54.94%
Democratic	Mert Riley	1,050	45.06%
Total votes		2,330	100.00%

General election results
Party	Candidate	Votes	%
Democratic	Kathleen McBride (incumbent)	2,443	100.00%
Total votes		2,443	100.00%
Democratic hold			

=== District 86 ===
Democratic primary results
Party	Candidate	Votes	%
Democratic	Robert J. "Bob" Pavlovich (incumbent)	1,147	100.00%
Total votes		1,147	100.00%

General election results
Party	Candidate	Votes	%
Democratic	Robert J. "Bob" Pavlovich (incumbent)	1,793	100.00%
Total votes		1,793	100.00%
Democratic hold			

=== District 87 ===
Democratic primary results
Party	Candidate	Votes	%
Democratic	Fred "Fritz" Daily (incumbent)	1,466	82.45%
Democratic	Larry "Brew" Brewer	312	17.55%
Total votes		1,778	100.00%

General election results
Party	Candidate	Votes	%
Democratic	Fred "Fritz" Daily (incumbent)	2,099	100.00%
Total votes		2,099	100.00%
Democratic hold			

=== District 88 ===
Democratic primary results
Party	Candidate	Votes	%
Democratic	Dan W. Harrington (incumbent)	1,242	67.54%
Democratic	Nick F. Simon	597	32.46%
Total votes		1,839	100.00%

General election results
Party	Candidate	Votes	%
Democratic	Dan W. Harrington (incumbent)	1,900	100.00%
Total votes		1,900	100.00%
Democratic hold			

=== District 89 ===
Democratic primary results
Party	Candidate	Votes	%
Democratic	Joe F. Kanduch Sr. (incumbent)	979	100.00%
Total votes		979	100.00%

General election results
Party	Candidate	Votes	%
Democratic	Joe F. Kanduch Sr. (incumbent)	1,440	100.00%
Total votes		1,440	100.00%
Democratic hold			

=== District 90 ===
Democratic primary results
Party	Candidate	Votes	%
Democratic	William "Red" Menahan (incumbent)	1,911	100.00%
Total votes		1,911	100.00%

General election results
Party	Candidate	Votes	%
Democratic	William "Red" Menahan (incumbent)	2,287	100.00%
Total votes		2,287	100.00%
Democratic hold			

=== District 91 ===
Democratic primary results
Party	Candidate	Votes	%
Democratic	Ken Robbins (incumbent)	1,374	100.00%
Total votes		1,374	100.00%

Republican primary results
Party	Candidate	Votes	%
Republican	John W. Robinson	989	100.00%
Total votes		989	100.00%

General election results
Party	Candidate	Votes	%
Democratic	Ken Robbins (incumbent)	2,518	51.06%
Republican	John W. Robinson	2,413	48.94%
Total votes		4,931	100.00%
Democratic hold			

=== District 92 ===
Democratic primary results
Party	Candidate	Votes	%
Democratic	Dale Burk	1,227	100.00%
Total votes		1,227	100.00%

Republican primary results
Party	Candidate	Votes	%
Republican	Bob Thoft (incumbent)	1,329	100.00%
Total votes		1,329	100.00%

General election results
Party	Candidate	Votes	%
Republican	Bob Thoft (incumbent)	3,866	64.47%
Democratic	Dale Burk	2,131	35.53%
Total votes		5,997	100.00%
Republican hold			

=== District 93 ===
Democratic primary results
Party	Candidate	Votes	%
Democratic	Carol Mitchell	797	52.64%
Democratic	Glenn K. Randles	479	31.64%
Democratic	Tom Jacobsen	238	15.72%
Total votes		1,514	100.00%

Republican primary results
Party	Candidate	Votes	%
Republican	В.Т. "Ben" Hanson	735	100.00%
Total votes		735	100.00%

General election results
Party	Candidate	Votes	%
Republican	В.Т. "Ben" Hanson	2,299	50.81%
Democratic	Carol Mitchell	2,226	49.19%
Total votes		4,525	100.00%
Republican hold			

=== District 94 ===
Democratic primary results
Party	Candidate	Votes	%
Democratic	Daniel Kemmis (incumbent)	935	100.00%
Total votes		935	100.00%

General election results
Party	Candidate	Votes	%
Democratic	Daniel Kemmis (incumbent)	2,362	100.00%
Total votes		2,362	100.00%
Democratic hold			

=== District 95 ===
Democratic primary results
Party	Candidate	Votes	%
Democratic	Ann Mary Dussault (incumbent)	1,274	100.00%
Total votes		1,274	100.00%

Republican primary results
Party	Candidate	Votes	%
Republican	Marilyn Fernelius	361	100.00%
Total votes		361	100.00%

General election results
Party	Candidate	Votes	%
Democratic	Ann Mary Dussault (incumbent)	2,746	68.16%
Republican	Marilyn Fernelius	1,283	31.84%
Total votes		4,029	100.00%
Democratic hold			

=== District 96 ===
Democratic primary results
Party	Candidate	Votes	%
Democratic	James D. Azzara (incumbent)	1,071	100.00%
Total votes		1,071	100.00%

Republican primary results
Party	Candidate	Votes	%
Republican	F. Janell Hopkins	283	100.00%
Total votes		283	100.00%

General election results
Party	Candidate	Votes	%
Democratic	James D. Azzara (incumbent)	2,185	69.94%
Republican	F. Janell Hopkins	939	30.06%
Total votes		3,124	100.00%
Democratic hold			

=== District 97 ===
Democratic primary results
Party	Candidate	Votes	%
Democratic	Steve Waldron (incumbent)	875	100.00%
Total votes		875	100.00%

Republican primary results
Party	Candidate	Votes	%
Republican	Don Stinger (Note: Although Don Stinger won the primary, no candidate appeared as the party's nominee in the general election.)	263	100.00%
Total votes		263	100.00%

General election results
Party	Candidate	Votes	%
Democratic	Steve Waldron (incumbent)	2,243	100.00%
Total votes		2,243	100.00%
Democratic hold			

=== District 98 ===
Democratic primary results
Party	Candidate	Votes	%
Democratic	Dennis L. Veleber	849	100.00%
Total votes		849	100.00%

Republican primary results
Party	Candidate	Votes	%
Republican	R. Budd Gould (incumbent)	604	100.00%
Total votes		604	100.00%

General election results
Party	Candidate	Votes	%
Republican	R. Budd Gould (incumbent)	2,257	62.37%
Democratic	Dennis L. Veleber	1,362	37.63%
Total votes		3,619	100.00%
Republican hold			

=== District 99 ===
Democratic primary results
Party	Candidate	Votes	%
Democratic	Jackie McGiffert	1,262	100.00%
Total votes		1,262	100.00%

Republican primary results
Party	Candidate	Votes	%
Republican	Earl C. Lory (incumbent)	834	100.00%
Total votes		834	100.00%

General election results
Party	Candidate	Votes	%
Republican	Earl C. Lory (incumbent)	2,536	59.70%
Democratic	Jackie McGiffert	1,712	40.30%
Total votes		4,248	100.00%
Republican hold			

=== District 100 ===
Democratic primary results
Party	Candidate	Votes	%
Democratic	Sylvia E. Stevens	1,165	100.00%
Total votes		1,165	100.00%

Republican primary results
Party	Candidate	Votes	%
Republican	Ralph S. Eudaily (incumbent)	752	100.00%
Total votes		752	100.00%

General election results
Party	Candidate	Votes	%
Republican	Ralph S. Eudaily (incumbent)	2,725	61.81%
Democratic	Sylvia E. Stevens	1,684	38.19%
Total votes		4,409	100.00%
Republican hold			

== See also ==
- 1980 United States presidential election in Montana
- 1980 United States House of Representatives elections in Montana
- 1980 Montana gubernatorial election
- 1980 Montana Senate election
