= 1978 Montana House of Representatives election =

- November 7, 1978

All 100 seats in the Montana House of Representatives 51 seats needed for a majority
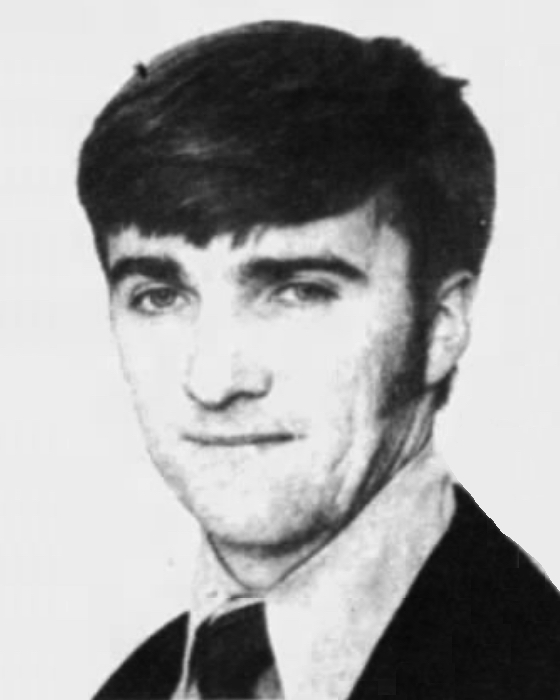
	Majority party	Minority party
		Rep
Leader	John Brian Driscoll (retired)	Bob Marks
Party	Democratic	Republican
Leader's seat	91st-Hamilton	80th-Clancy
Last election	57	43
Seats after	55	45
Seat change	▼2	▲2
Speaker before election
John Brian Driscoll
Democratic
Elected Speaker
Harold E. Gerke
Democratic

The 1978 Montana House of Representatives election took place on November 7, 1978, with the primary election held on June 6, 1978. Montana voters elected all 100 members of the Montana House of Representatives to serve two-year terms. The election coincided with United States national elections and Montana state elections, including U.S. Senate, U.S. House, and Montana Senate.

Following the previous election in 1976, Democrats held a 57-to-43-seat majority over Republicans. Democrats maintained their majority in the legislature with 55 seats, while Republicans were elected in 45 seats—giving Republicans a net gain of two seats. The newly elected members served in the 46th Montana State Legislature, during which Democrat Harold E. Gerke was elected Speaker of the Montana House.

== Retiring incumbents ==
=== Democrats ===
1. District 8: Edna A. Gunderson
2. District 35: Jack Gunderson
3. District 37: Patrick L. Ryan
4. District 61: Gary L. Colburn
5. District 77: Dorothy M. Bradley
6. District 87: John "J.D." Lynch
7. District 91: John Brian Driscoll
8. District 94: Gary Niles Kimble
9. District 96: Bob Palmer

=== Republicans ===
1. District 9: David Aageson
2. District 48: Fred O. Barrett
3. District 79: Dale H. Davis
4. District 92: Elmer D. Severson

== Incumbents defeated in primary election ==
=== Democrats ===
1. District 24: Harry Hansen
2. District 85: James T. Mular
3. District 86: Jim Courtney

== Incumbents defeated in general election ==
=== Democrats ===
1. District 14: Leo Kennerly Jr.
2. District 15: Russell Baeth
3. District 16: Ora J. Halvorson
4. District 29: Peter M. "Mike" Meloy
5. District 32: JoEllen Estenson
6. District 40: John F. Kenny

=== Republicans ===
1. District 18: Lee Tower
2. District 19: Clyde A. Turner
3. District 43: Warren O'Keefe
4. District 72: Jean McLane
5. District 74: Edith E. Cox

== Summary of results ==
Italics denote an open seat held by the incumbent party; bold text denotes a gain for a party.

State house district	Incumbent	Party	Elected representative	Outcome
1	Dennis G. Nathe	Rep	Dennis G. Nathe	Rep hold
2	Art Lund	Rep	Art Lund	Rep hold
3	Orren C. Vinger	Rep	Orren C. Vinger	Rep hold
4	G. C. "Jerry" Feda	Rep	G. C. "Jerry" Feda	Rep hold
5	Paul K. Kropp	Rep	Paul K. Kropp	Rep hold
6	Francis Bardanouve	Dem	Francis Bardanouve	Dem hold
7	Robert Sivertsen	Rep	Robert Sivertsen	Rep hold
8	Edna A. Gunderson	Dem	Danny Oberg	Dem hold
9	David Aageson	Rep	Dennis Iverson	Rep hold
10	Audrey Roth	Rep	Audrey Roth	Rep hold
11	Rex Manuel	Dem	Rex Manuel	Dem hold
12	Melvin Underdal	Rep	Melvin Underdal	Rep hold
13	George R. Johnston	Dem	George R. Johnston	Dem hold
14	Leo Kennerly Jr.	Dem	**Harriet Hayne**	**Rep gain**
15	Russell Baeth	Dem	**W. F. Bennett**	**Rep gain**
16	Ora J. Halvorson	Dem	**Robert Lewis Anderson**	**Rep gain**
17	Jack Brian Uhde	Dem	Jack Brian Uhde	Dem hold
18	Lee Tower	Rep	**Michael H. Keedy**	**Dem gain**
19	Clyde A. Turner	Rep	**Patricia E. Gesek**	**Dem gain**
20	Aubyn A. Curtiss	Rep	Aubyn A. Curtiss	Rep hold
21	William R. "Bill" Baeth	Dem	William R. "Bill" Baeth	Dem hold
22	Arthur H. "Art" Shelden	Dem	Arthur H. "Art" Shelden	Dem hold
23	Chris H. Stobie	Rep	Chris H. Stobie	Rep hold
24	Harry Hansen	Dem	Joseph M. Magone	Dem hold
25	William Ray Jensen	Rep	William Ray Jensen	Rep hold
26	Carl A. Seifert	Rep	Carl A. Seifert	Rep hold
27	Verner L. Bertelsen	Rep	Verner L. Bertelsen	Rep hold
28	Joe Brand	Dem	Joe Brand	Dem hold
29	Peter M. "Mike" Meloy	Dem	**Gene Donaldson**	**Rep gain**
30	Hal Harper	Dem	Hal Harper	Dem hold
31	Jerry Metcalf	Dem	Jerry Metcalf	Dem hold
32	JoEllen Estenson	Dem	**Barbara J. "Bobby" Spilker**	**Rep gain**
33	John B. Staigmiller	Dem	John B. Staigmiller	Dem hold
34	Helen G. O'Connell	Dem	Helen G. O'Connell	Dem hold
35	Jack Gunderson	Dem	Richard E. Manning	Dem hold
36	Joe Tropila	Dem	Joe Tropila	Dem hold
37	Patrick L. Ryan	Dem	Arlyne Reichert	Dem hold
38	Peter J. Gilligan Jr.	Dem	Peter J. Gilligan Jr.	Dem hold
39	Paul G. Pistoria	Dem	Paul G. Pistoria	Dem hold
40	John F. Kenny	Dem	**Andrea "Andy" Hemstad**	**Rep gain**
41	Jack K. Moore	Rep	Jack K. Moore	Rep hold
42	Darryl Meyer	Rep	Darryl Meyer	Rep hold
43	Warren O'Keefe	Rep	**Jonas H. Rosenthal**	**Dem gain**
44	Jay Fabrega	Rep	Jay Fabrega	Rep hold
45	Burt L. Hurwitz	Rep	Burt L. Hurwitz	Rep hold
46	Hershel M. Robbins	Dem	Hershel M. Robbins	Dem hold
47	Gene N. Ernst	Rep	Gene N. Ernst	Rep hold
48	Fred O. Barrett	Rep	James M. Schultz	Rep hold
49	Edward Lien	Dem	Edward Lien	Dem hold
50	E. N. "Ernie" Dassinger	Dem	E. N. "Ernie" Dassinger	Dem hold
51	Carroll V. South	Dem	Carroll V. South	Dem hold
52	Les J. Hirsch	Dem	Les J. Hirsch	Dem hold
53	Oscar S. Kvaalen	Rep	Oscar S. Kvaalen	Rep hold
54	William M. "Willie" Day	Dem	William M. "Willie" Day	Dem hold
55	L. E. "Gene" Wood	Rep	L. E. "Gene" Wood	Rep hold
56	Harold A. Wyrick	Rep	Harold A. Wyrick	Rep hold
57	Carl M. Smith	Rep	Carl M. Smith	Rep hold
58	Thomas R. Conroy	Dem	Thomas R. Conroy	Dem hold
59	Esther G. Bengtson	Dem	Esther G. Bengtson	Dem hold
60	Gene Frates	Dem	Gene Frates	Dem hold
61	Gary L. Colburn	Dem	Robert Dozier	Dem hold
62	Harold E. Gerke	Dem	Harold E. Gerke	Dem hold
63	Harrison G. Fagg	Rep	Harrison G. Fagg	Rep hold
64	Jack Ramirez	Rep	Jack Ramirez	Rep hold
65	Howard C. Porter	Rep	Howard C. Porter	Rep hold
66	Gerald R. Kessler	Dem	Gerald R. Kessler	Dem hold
67	Polly Holmes	Dem	Polly Holmes	Dem hold
68	Herb Huennekens	Dem	Herb Huennekens	Dem hold
69	Wes Teague	Dem	Wes Teague	Dem hold
70	J. Melvin "Mel" Williams	Dem	J. Melvin "Mel" Williams	Dem hold
71	James H. "Jim" Burnett	Rep	James H. "Jim" Burnett	Rep hold
72	Jean McLane	Rep	**Vicki Johnson**	**Dem gain**
73	Orval S. Ellison	Rep	Orval S. Ellison	Rep hold
74	Edith E. Cox	Rep	**Dan Yardley**	**Dem gain**
75	Robert A. Ellerd	Rep	Robert A. Ellerd	Rep hold
76	John P. Scully	Dem	John P. Scully	Dem hold
77	Dorothy M. Bradley	Dem	**Kenneth L. Nordtvedt Jr.**	**Rep gain**
78	John Vincent	Dem	John Vincent	Dem hold
79	Dale H. Davis	Rep	Walter R. Sales	Rep hold
80	Robert L. "Bob" Marks	Rep	Robert L. "Bob" Marks	Rep hold
81	Kerry Keyser	Rep	Kerry Keyser	Rep hold
82	Bill Hand	Dem	Bill Hand	Dem hold
83	Mike Cooney	Dem	Mike Cooney	Dem hold
84	Joe Quilici	Dem	Joe Quilici	Dem hold
85	James T. Mular	Dem	Kathleen McBride	Dem hold
86	Jim Courtney	Dem	Robert J. "Bob" Pavlovich	Dem hold
87	John "J.D." Lynch	Dem	Fred "Fritz" Daily	Dem hold
88	Dan W. Harrington	Dem	Dan W. Harrington	Dem hold
89	Joe F. Kanduch Sr.	Dem	Joe F. Kanduch Sr.	Dem hold
90	William "Red" Menahan	Dem	William "Red" Menahan	Dem hold
91	John Brian Driscoll	Dem	Ken Robbins	Dem hold
92	Elmer D. Severson	Rep	Bob Thoft	Rep hold
93	Howard L. Ellis	Rep	Howard L. Ellis	Rep hold
94	Gary Niles Kimble	Dem	Daniel Kemmis	Dem hold
95	Ann Mary Dussault	Dem	Ann Mary Dussault	Dem hold
96	Bob Palmer	Dem	James Azzara	Dem hold
97	Steve Waldron	Dem	Steve Waldron	Dem hold
98	R. Budd Gould	Rep	R. Budd Gould	Rep hold
99	Earl C. Lory	Rep	Earl C. Lory	Rep hold
100	Ralph S. Eudaily	Rep	Ralph S. Eudaily	Rep hold

== Detailed results by district ==
=== District 1 ===
Democratic primary results
Party	Candidate	Votes	%
Democratic	Glenn Jacobsen	1,133	100.00%
Total votes		1,133	100.00%

Republican primary results
Party	Candidate	Votes	%
Republican	Dennis G. Nathe (incumbent)	284	100.00%
Total votes		284	100.00%

General election results
Party	Candidate	Votes	%
Republican	Dennis G. Nathe (incumbent)	1,593	54.37%
Democratic	Glenn Jacobsen	1,337	45.63%
Total votes		2,930	100.00%
Republican hold			

=== District 2 ===
Republican primary results
Party	Candidate	Votes	%
Republican	Art Lund (incumbent)	526	100.00%
Total votes		526	100.00%

General election results
Party	Candidate	Votes	%
Republican	Art Lund (incumbent)	2,072	100.00%
Total votes		2,072	100.00%
Republican hold			

=== District 3 ===
Democratic primary results
Party	Candidate	Votes	%
Democratic	Ernest Kummerfeldt (Note: The candidate ran a write-in campaign in this election.)	165	100.00%
Total votes		165	100.00%

Republican primary results
Party	Candidate	Votes	%
Republican	Orren C. Vinger (incumbent)	471	100.00%
Total votes		471	100.00%

General election results
Party	Candidate	Votes	%
Republican	Orren C. Vinger (incumbent)	1,452	50.98%
Democratic	Ernest Kummerfeldt	1,396	49.02%
Total votes		2,848	100.00%
Republican hold			

=== District 4 ===
Democratic primary results
Party	Candidate	Votes	%
Democratic	Irene R. Baker	954	100.00%
Total votes		954	100.00%

Republican primary results
Party	Candidate	Votes	%
Republican	G. C. "Jerry" Feda (incumbent)	268	100.00%
Total votes		268	100.00%

General election results
Party	Candidate	Votes	%
Republican	G. C. "Jerry" Feda (incumbent)	1,444	55.67%
Democratic	Irene R. Baker	1,150	44.33%
Total votes		2,594	100.00%
Republican hold			

=== District 5 ===
Democratic primary results
Party	Candidate	Votes	%
Democratic	Colleen Barnard	751	100.00%
Total votes		751	100.00%

Republican primary results
Party	Candidate	Votes	%
Republican	Paul K. Kropp (incumbent)	542	100.00%
Total votes		542	100.00%

General election results
Party	Candidate	Votes	%
Republican	Paul K. Kropp (incumbent)	1,654	55.02%
Democratic	Colleen Barnard	1,352	44.98%
Total votes		3,006	100.00%
Republican hold			

=== District 6 ===
Democratic primary results
Party	Candidate	Votes	%
Democratic	Francis Bardanouve (incumbent)	1,474	100.00%
Total votes		1,474	100.00%

General election results
Party	Candidate	Votes	%
Democratic	Francis Bardanouve (incumbent)	2,287	100.00%
Total votes		2,287	100.00%
Democratic hold			

=== District 7 ===
Democratic primary results
Party	Candidate	Votes	%
Democratic	Shirley Louise Hanson	768	100.00%
Total votes		768	100.00%

Republican primary results
Party	Candidate	Votes	%
Republican	Robert Sivertsen (incumbent)	414	100.00%
Total votes		414	100.00%

General election results
Party	Candidate	Votes	%
Republican	Robert Sivertsen (incumbent)	1,547	64.08%
Democratic	Shirley Louise Hanson	867	35.92%
Total votes		2,414	100.00%
Republican hold			

=== District 8 ===
Democratic primary results
Party	Candidate	Votes	%
Democratic	Danny Oberg	746	100.00%
Total votes		746	100.00%

Republican primary results
Party	Candidate	Votes	%
Republican	Collyn Peklewsky	264	100.00%
Total votes		264	100.00%

General election results
Party	Candidate	Votes	%
Democratic	Danny Oberg	1,184	52.83%
Republican	Collyn Peklewsky	1,057	47.17%
Total votes		2,241	100.00%
Democratic hold			

=== District 9 ===
Democratic primary results
Party	Candidate	Votes	%
Democratic	Darlene Skari	835	100.00%
Total votes		835	100.00%

Republican primary results
Party	Candidate	Votes	%
Republican	Dennis Iverson	396	100.00%
Total votes		396	100.00%

General election results
Party	Candidate	Votes	%
Republican	Dennis Iverson	1,675	62.45%
Democratic	Darlene Skari	1,007	37.55%
Total votes		2,682	100.00%
Republican hold			

=== District 10 ===
Democratic primary results
Party	Candidate	Votes	%
Democratic	Junne Johnsrud	1,175	52.36%
Democratic	A. Evon Anderson	1,069	47.64%
Total votes		2,244	100.00%

Republican primary results
Party	Candidate	Votes	%
Republican	Audrey Roth (incumbent)	206	100.00%
Total votes		206	100.00%

General election results
Party	Candidate	Votes	%
Republican	Audrey Roth (incumbent)	2,547	77.72%
Democratic	Junne Johnsrud	730	22.28%
Total votes		3,277	100.00%
Republican hold			

=== District 11 ===
Democratic primary results
Party	Candidate	Votes	%
Democratic	Rex Manuel (incumbent)	1,838	100.00%
Total votes		1,838	100.00%

Republican primary results
Party	Candidate	Votes	%
Republican	Fava M. Evensen	443	100.00%
Total votes		443	100.00%

General election results
Party	Candidate	Votes	%
Democratic	Rex Manuel (incumbent)	2,218	61.00%
Republican	Fava M. Evensen	1,418	39.00%
Total votes		3,636	100.00%
Democratic hold			

=== District 12 ===
Democratic primary results
Party	Candidate	Votes	%
Democratic	Dean A. Hellinger	1,328	100.00%
Total votes		1,328	100.00%

Republican primary results
Party	Candidate	Votes	%
Republican	Melvin Underdal (incumbent)	656	100.00%
Total votes		656	100.00%

General election results
Party	Candidate	Votes	%
Republican	Melvin Underdal (incumbent)	1,870	57.17%
Democratic	Dean A. Hellinger	1,401	42.83%
Total votes		3,271	100.00%
Republican hold			

=== District 13 ===
Democratic primary results
Party	Candidate	Votes	%
Democratic	George R. Johnston (incumbent)	786	50.45%
Democratic	Glenn A. Roush	772	49.55%
Total votes		1,558	100.00%

General election results
Party	Candidate	Votes	%
Democratic	George R. Johnston (incumbent)	2,071	100.00%
Total votes		2,071	100.00%
Democratic hold			

=== District 14 ===
Democratic primary results
Party	Candidate	Votes	%
Democratic	Leo Kennerly Jr. (incumbent)	887	100.00%
Total votes		887	100.00%

Republican primary results
Party	Candidate	Votes	%
Republican	Harriet Hayne	236	56.06%
Republican	Dick Greenshields	185	43.94%
Total votes		421	100.00%

General election results
Party	Candidate	Votes	%
Republican	Harriet Hayne	1,072	54.89%
Democratic	Leo Kennerly Jr. (incumbent)	881	45.11%
Total votes		1,953	100.00%
Republican gain from Democratic			

=== District 15 ===
Democratic primary results
Party	Candidate	Votes	%
Democratic	Russell Baeth (incumbent)	772	100.00%
Total votes		772	100.00%

Republican primary results
Party	Candidate	Votes	%
Republican	W. F. Bennett	366	100.00%
Total votes		366	100.00%

General election results
Party	Candidate	Votes	%
Republican	W. F. Bennett	1,295	52.73%
Democratic	Russell Baeth (incumbent)	1,161	47.27%
Total votes		2,456	100.00%
Republican gain from Democratic			

=== District 16 ===
Democratic primary results
Party	Candidate	Votes	%
Democratic	Ora J. Halvorson (incumbent)	957	100.00%
Total votes		957	100.00%

Republican primary results
Party	Candidate	Votes	%
Republican	Robert Lewis Anderson	354	41.02%
Republican	Walter Deets	279	32.33%
Republican	G. W. Bennett	230	26.65%
Total votes		863	100.00%

General election results
Party	Candidate	Votes	%
Republican	Robert Lewis Anderson	2,059	57.98%
Democratic	Ora J. Halvorson (incumbent)	1,492	42.02%
Total votes		3,551	100.00%
Republican gain from Democratic			

=== District 17 ===
Democratic primary results
Party	Candidate	Votes	%
Democratic	Jack Brian Uhde (incumbent)	845	100.00%
Total votes		845	100.00%

Republican primary results
Party	Candidate	Votes	%
Republican	John K. "Jack" McDonald	465	58.86%
Republican	Tom L. Jones	325	41.14%
Total votes		790	100.00%

General election results
Party	Candidate	Votes	%
Democratic	Jack Brian Uhde (incumbent)	1,877	59.85%
Republican	John K. "Jack" McDonald	1,173	37.40%
Independent	L. H. "Les" Larrivee	86	2.74%
Total votes		3,136	100.00%
Democratic hold			

=== District 18 ===
Democratic primary results
Party	Candidate	Votes	%
Democratic	Michael H. Keedy	701	100.00%
Total votes		701	100.00%

Republican primary results
Party	Candidate	Votes	%
Republican	Lee Tower (incumbent)	863	100.00%
Total votes		863	100.00%

General election results
Party	Candidate	Votes	%
Democratic	Michael H. Keedy	1,781	54.04%
Republican	Lee Tower (incumbent)	1,515	45.96%
Total votes		3,296	100.00%
Democratic gain from Republican			

=== District 19 ===
Democratic primary results
Party	Candidate	Votes	%
Democratic	Patricia E. Gesek	557	52.85%
Democratic	Bob Finley	497	47.15%
Total votes		1,054	100.00%

Republican primary results
Party	Candidate	Votes	%
Republican	Clyde A. Turner (incumbent)	575	100.00%
Total votes		575	100.00%

General election results
Party	Candidate	Votes	%
Democratic	Patricia E. Gesek	1,546	53.44%
Republican	Clyde A. Turner (incumbent)	1,347	46.56%
Total votes		2,893	100.00%
Democratic gain from Republican			

=== District 20 ===
Democratic primary results
Party	Candidate	Votes	%
Democratic	William G. "Bill" Gwynn	832	100.00%
Total votes		832	100.00%

Republican primary results
Party	Candidate	Votes	%
Republican	Aubyn A. Curtiss (incumbent)	457	100.00%
Total votes		457	100.00%

General election results
Party	Candidate	Votes	%
Republican	Aubyn A. Curtiss (incumbent)	1,477	57.85%
Democratic	William G. "Bill" Gwynn	1,076	42.15%
Total votes		2,553	100.00%
Republican hold			

=== District 21 ===
Democratic primary results
Party	Candidate	Votes	%
Democratic	William R. "Bill" Baeth (incumbent)	1,130	100.00%
Total votes		1,130	100.00%

General election results
Party	Candidate	Votes	%
Democratic	William R. "Bill" Baeth (incumbent)	1,812	100.00%
Total votes		1,812	100.00%
Democratic hold			

=== District 22 ===
Democratic primary results
Party	Candidate	Votes	%
Democratic	Arthur H. "Art" Shelden (incumbent)	1,039	100.00%
Total votes		1,039	100.00%

General election results
Party	Candidate	Votes	%
Democratic	Arthur H. "Art" Shelden (incumbent)	1,619	100.00%
Total votes		1,619	100.00%
Democratic hold			

=== District 23 ===
Democratic primary results
Party	Candidate	Votes	%
Democratic	Sam E. Silverthorn	656	53.38%
Democratic	Henry L. Gill	573	46.62%
Total votes		1,229	100.00%

Republican primary results
Party	Candidate	Votes	%
Republican	Chris H. Stobie (incumbent)	1,082	100.00%
Total votes		1,082	100.00%

General election results
Party	Candidate	Votes	%
Republican	Chris H. Stobie (incumbent)	2,160	64.81%
Democratic	Sam E. Silverthorn	1,173	35.19%
Total votes		3,333	100.00%
Republican hold			

=== District 24 ===
Democratic primary results
Party	Candidate	Votes	%
Democratic	Joseph M. Magone	1,085	50.25%
Democratic	Harry Hansen (incumbent)	828	38.35%
Democratic	John W. Washburn	246	11.39%
Total votes		2,159	100.00%

General election results
Party	Candidate	Votes	%
Democratic	Joseph M. Magone	2,807	100.00%
Total votes		2,807	100.00%
Democratic hold			

=== District 25 ===
Democratic primary results
Party	Candidate	Votes	%
Democratic	Larry Anderson (Note: Although Larry Anderson won the primary, Michael J. Fisher was the Democratic nominee in the general election.)	767	58.86%
Democratic	Michael J. Fisher	536	41.14%
Total votes		1,303	100.00%

Republican primary results
Party	Candidate	Votes	%
Republican	William Ray Jensen (incumbent)	708	100.00%
Total votes		708	100.00%

General election results
Party	Candidate	Votes	%
Republican	William Ray Jensen (incumbent)	1,536	50.34%
Democratic	Michael J. Fisher	1,515	49.66%
Total votes		3,051	100.00%
Republican hold			

=== District 26 ===
Democratic primary results
Party	Candidate	Votes	%
Democratic	Larry L. Robinson	1,005	100.00%
Total votes		1,005	100.00%

Republican primary results
Party	Candidate	Votes	%
Republican	Carl A. Seifert (incumbent)	1,237	100.00%
Total votes		1,237	100.00%

General election results
Party	Candidate	Votes	%
Republican	Carl A. Seifert (incumbent)	2,096	54.51%
Democratic	Larry L. Robinson	1,749	45.49%
Total votes		3,845	100.00%
Republican hold			

=== District 27 ===
Democratic primary results
Party	Candidate	Votes	%
Democratic	Joe Strakal	1,044	100.00%
Total votes		1,044	100.00%

Republican primary results
Party	Candidate	Votes	%
Republican	Verner L. Bertelsen (incumbent)	784	100.00%
Total votes		784	100.00%

General election results
Party	Candidate	Votes	%
Republican	Verner L. Bertelsen (incumbent)	1,686	54.69%
Democratic	Joe Strakal	1,397	45.31%
Total votes		3,083	100.00%
Republican hold			

=== District 28 ===
Democratic primary results
Party	Candidate	Votes	%
Democratic	Joe Brand (incumbent)	993	100.00%
Total votes		993	100.00%

General election results
Party	Candidate	Votes	%
Democratic	Joe Brand (incumbent)	1,857	100.00%
Total votes		1,857	100.00%
Democratic hold			

=== District 29 ===
Democratic primary results
Party	Candidate	Votes	%
Democratic	Peter M. "Mike" Meloy (incumbent)	1,957	100.00%
Total votes		1,957	100.00%

Republican primary results
Party	Candidate	Votes	%
Republican	Gene Donaldson	301	100.00%
Total votes		301	100.00%

General election results
Party	Candidate	Votes	%
Republican	Gene Donaldson	2,117	51.63%
Democratic	Peter M. "Mike" Meloy (incumbent)	1,983	48.37%
Total votes		4,100	100.00%
Republican gain from Democratic			

=== District 30 ===
Democratic primary results
Party	Candidate	Votes	%
Democratic	Hal Harper (incumbent)	1,043	56.26%
Democratic	Timothy McCann	811	43.74%
Total votes		1,854	100.00%

Republican primary results
Party	Candidate	Votes	%
Republican	Alan V. Johnson	288	51.99%
Republican	Arthur F. "Art" Kussman	266	48.01%
Total votes		554	100.00%

General election results
Party	Candidate	Votes	%
Democratic	Hal Harper (incumbent)	1,965	55.97%
Republican	Alan V. Johnson	1,546	44.03%
Total votes		3,511	100.00%
Democratic hold			

=== District 31 ===
Democratic primary results
Party	Candidate	Votes	%
Democratic	Jerry Metcalf (incumbent)	1,104	100.00%
Total votes		1,104	100.00%

Republican primary results
Party	Candidate	Votes	%
Republican	Wayne Phillips	180	100.00%
Total votes		180	100.00%

General election results
Party	Candidate	Votes	%
Democratic	Jerry Metcalf (incumbent)	1,391	56.18%
Republican	Wayne Phillips	1,085	43.82%
Total votes		2,476	100.00%
Democratic hold			

=== District 32 ===
Democratic primary results
Party	Candidate	Votes	%
Democratic	JoEllen Estenson (incumbent)	1,261	100.00%
Total votes		1,261	100.00%

Republican primary results
Party	Candidate	Votes	%
Republican	Barbara J. "Bobby" Spilker	321	100.00%
Total votes		321	100.00%

General election results
Party	Candidate	Votes	%
Republican	Barbara J. "Bobby" Spilker	1,773	51.07%
Democratic	JoEllen Estenson (incumbent)	1,699	48.93%
Total votes		3,472	100.00%
Republican gain from Democratic			

=== District 33 ===
Democratic primary results
Party	Candidate	Votes	%
Democratic	John B. Staigmiller (incumbent)	1,116	100.00%
Total votes		1,116	100.00%

Republican primary results
Party	Candidate	Votes	%
Republican	Charles H. Penwell	214	100.00%
Total votes		214	100.00%

General election results
Party	Candidate	Votes	%
Democratic	John B. Staigmiller (incumbent)	1,700	65.94%
Republican	Charles H. Penwell	878	34.06%
Total votes		2,578	100.00%
Democratic hold			

=== District 34 ===
Democratic primary results
Party	Candidate	Votes	%
Democratic	Helen G. O'Connell (incumbent)	751	65.70%
Democratic	Mary Hempleman	392	34.30%
Total votes		1,143	100.00%

General election results
Party	Candidate	Votes	%
Democratic	Helen G. O'Connell (incumbent)	1,604	100.00%
Total votes		1,604	100.00%
Democratic hold			

=== District 35 ===
Democratic primary results
Party	Candidate	Votes	%
Democratic	Richard E. Manning	532	64.41%
Democratic	Robert R. Hunter	294	35.59%
Total votes		826	100.00%

Republican primary results
Party	Candidate	Votes	%
Republican	Jerry E. Santy	116	100.00%
Total votes		116	100.00%

General election results
Party	Candidate	Votes	%
Democratic	Richard E. Manning	1,028	57.59%
Republican	Jerry E. Santy	757	42.41%
Total votes		1,785	100.00%
Democratic hold			

=== District 36 ===
Democratic primary results
Party	Candidate	Votes	%
Democratic	Joe Tropila (incumbent)	939	100.00%
Total votes		939	100.00%

Republican primary results
Party	Candidate	Votes	%
Republican	Toni Bergene	198	100.00%
Total votes		198	100.00%

General election results
Party	Candidate	Votes	%
Democratic	Joe Tropila (incumbent)	1,180	51.35%
Republican	Toni Bergene	1,118	48.65%
Total votes		2,298	100.00%
Democratic hold			

=== District 37 ===
Democratic primary results
Party	Candidate	Votes	%
Democratic	Arlyne Reichert	495	59.93%
Democratic	Ann M. Allen	331	40.07%
Total votes		826	100.00%

Republican primary results
Party	Candidate	Votes	%
Republican	Edwin L. Cunningham (Note: Although Edwin L. Cunningham won the primary, Kay F. Sellers was the Republican nominee in the general election.)	65	100.00%
Total votes		65	100.00%

General election results
Party	Candidate	Votes	%
Democratic	Arlyne Reichert	985	70.26%
Republican	Kay F. Sellers	417	29.74%
Total votes		1,402	100.00%
Democratic hold			

=== District 38 ===
Democratic primary results
Party	Candidate	Votes	%
Democratic	Peter J. Gilligan Jr. (incumbent)	670	100.00%
Total votes		670	100.00%

Republican primary results
Party	Candidate	Votes	%
Republican	Dick Olsen (Note: Although Dick Olsen won the primary, W. J. "Wally" Buscher was the Republican nominee in the general election.)	133	100.00%
Total votes		133	100.00%

General election results
Party	Candidate	Votes	%
Democratic	Peter J. Gilligan Jr. (incumbent)	1,104	64.86%
Republican	W. J. "Wally" Buscher	598	35.14%
Total votes		1,702	100.00%
Democratic hold			

=== District 39 ===
Democratic primary results
Party	Candidate	Votes	%
Democratic	Paul G. Pistoria (incumbent)	586	57.68%
Democratic	Vicki S. Everson	430	42.32%
Total votes		1,016	100.00%

Republican primary results
Party	Candidate	Votes	%
Republican	Vernon K. Hanks	104	63.03%
Republican	Gene Van Buren	61	36.97%
Total votes		165	100.00%

General election results
Party	Candidate	Votes	%
Democratic	Paul G. Pistoria (incumbent)	1,032	56.83%
Republican	Vernon K. Hanks	784	43.17%
Total votes		1,816	100.00%
Democratic hold			

=== District 40 ===
Democratic primary results
Party	Candidate	Votes	%
Democratic	John F. Kenny (incumbent)	803	100.00%
Total votes		803	100.00%

Republican primary results
Party	Candidate	Votes	%
Republican	Andrea "Andy" Hemstad	206	62.24%
Republican	Brett C. Asselstine	125	37.76%
Total votes		331	100.00%

General election results
Party	Candidate	Votes	%
Republican	Andrea "Andy" Hemstad	1,270	55.78%
Democratic	John F. Kenny (incumbent)	1,007	44.22%
Total votes		2,277	100.00%
Republican gain from Democratic			

=== District 41 ===
Democratic primary results
Party	Candidate	Votes	%
Democratic	P. J. Gilfeather	848	100.00%
Total votes		848	100.00%

Republican primary results
Party	Candidate	Votes	%
Republican	Jack K. Moore (incumbent)	279	100.00%
Total votes		279	100.00%

General election results
Party	Candidate	Votes	%
Republican	Jack K. Moore (incumbent)	1,305	52.77%
Democratic	P. J. Gilfeather	1,168	47.23%
Total votes		2,473	100.00%
Republican hold			

=== District 42 ===
Democratic primary results
Party	Candidate	Votes	%
Democratic	Joseph F. Shea	676	100.00%
Total votes		676	100.00%

Republican primary results
Party	Candidate	Votes	%
Republican	Darryl Meyer (incumbent)	258	100.00%
Total votes		258	100.00%

General election results
Party	Candidate	Votes	%
Republican	Darryl Meyer (incumbent)	1,130	57.74%
Democratic	Joseph F. Shea	827	42.26%
Total votes		1,957	100.00%
Republican hold			

=== District 43 ===
Democratic primary results
Party	Candidate	Votes	%
Democratic	Jonas H. Rosenthal	15	100.00%
Total votes		15	100.00%

Republican primary results
Party	Candidate	Votes	%
Republican	Warren O'Keefe (incumbent)	7	100.00%
Total votes		7	100.00%

General election results
Party	Candidate	Votes	%
Democratic	Jonas H. Rosenthal	40	63.49%
Republican	Warren O'Keefe (incumbent)	23	36.51%
Total votes		63	100.00%
Democratic gain from Republican			

=== District 44 ===
Democratic primary results
Party	Candidate	Votes	%
Democratic	Carl J. Donovan	545	100.00%
Total votes		545	100.00%

Republican primary results
Party	Candidate	Votes	%
Republican	Jay Fabrega (incumbent)	365	82.02%
Republican	Virginia P. Knapp	80	17.98%
Total votes		445	100.00%

General election results
Party	Candidate	Votes	%
Republican	Jay Fabrega (incumbent)	1,509	70.28%
Democratic	Carl J. Donovan	638	29.72%
Total votes		2,147	100.00%
Republican hold			

=== District 45 ===
Republican primary results
Party	Candidate	Votes	%
Republican	Burt L. Hurwitz (incumbent)	562	100.00%
Total votes		562	100.00%

General election results
Party	Candidate	Votes	%
Republican	Burt L. Hurwitz (incumbent)	2,205	100.00%
Total votes		2,205	100.00%
Republican hold			

=== District 46 ===
Democratic primary results
Party	Candidate	Votes	%
Democratic	Hershel M. Robbins (incumbent)	1,201	100.00%
Total votes		1,201	100.00%

Republican primary results
Party	Candidate	Votes	%
Republican	J. K. "Kim" Kuzara	772	100.00%
Total votes		772	100.00%

General election results
Party	Candidate	Votes	%
Democratic	Hershel M. Robbins (incumbent)	2,048	57.54%
Republican	J. K. "Kim" Kuzara	1,511	42.46%
Total votes		3,559	100.00%
Democratic hold			

=== District 47 ===
Democratic primary results
Party	Candidate	Votes	%
Democratic	Sharon L. Peterson	1,288	100.00%
Total votes		1,288	100.00%

Republican primary results
Party	Candidate	Votes	%
Republican	Gene N. Ernst (incumbent)	489	100.00%
Total votes		489	100.00%

General election results
Party	Candidate	Votes	%
Republican	Gene N. Ernst (incumbent)	1,838	54.73%
Democratic	Sharon L. Peterson	1,520	45.27%
Total votes		3,358	100.00%
Republican hold			

=== District 48 ===
Republican primary results
Party	Candidate	Votes	%
Republican	James M. Schultz	484	100.00%
Total votes		484	100.00%

General election results
Party	Candidate	Votes	%
Republican	James M. Schultz	1,788	100.00%
Total votes		1,788	100.00%
Republican hold			

=== District 49 ===
Democratic primary results
Party	Candidate	Votes	%
Democratic	Edward Lien (incumbent)	785	100.00%
Total votes		785	100.00%

Republican primary results
Party	Candidate	Votes	%
Republican	Jerry B. Meissner	740	100.00%
Total votes		740	100.00%

General election results
Party	Candidate	Votes	%
Democratic	Edward Lien (incumbent)	1,601	57.36%
Republican	Jerry B. Meissner	1,190	42.64%
Total votes		2,791	100.00%
Democratic hold			

=== District 50 ===
Democratic primary results
Party	Candidate	Votes	%
Democratic	E. N. "Ernie" Dassinger (incumbent)	1,106	100.00%
Total votes		1,106	100.00%

Republican primary results
Party	Candidate	Votes	%
Republican	John H. Smith	559	53.54%
Republican	Harold Zent	485	46.46%
Total votes		1,044	100.00%

General election results
Party	Candidate	Votes	%
Democratic	E. N. "Ernie" Dassinger (incumbent)	1,813	52.84%
Republican	John H. Smith	1,618	47.16%
Total votes		3,431	100.00%
Democratic hold			

=== District 51 ===
Democratic primary results
Party	Candidate	Votes	%
Democratic	Carroll V. South (incumbent)	822	100.00%
Total votes		822	100.00%

General election results
Party	Candidate	Votes	%
Democratic	Carroll V. South (incumbent)	2,140	100.00%
Total votes		2,140	100.00%
Democratic hold			

=== District 52 ===
Democratic primary results
Party	Candidate	Votes	%
Democratic	Les J. Hirsch (incumbent)	891	100.00%
Total votes		891	100.00%

Republican primary results
Party	Candidate	Votes	%
Republican	Fred D. Wacker	799	100.00%
Total votes		799	100.00%

General election results
Party	Candidate	Votes	%
Democratic	Les J. Hirsch (incumbent)	2,065	63.07%
Republican	Fred D. Wacker	1,209	36.93%
Total votes		3,274	100.00%
Democratic hold			

=== District 53 ===
Democratic primary results
Party	Candidate	Votes	%
Democratic	William A. "Bill" Martin	487	100.00%
Total votes		487	100.00%

Republican primary results
Party	Candidate	Votes	%
Republican	Oscar S. Kvaalen (incumbent)	585	100.00%
Total votes		585	100.00%

General election results
Party	Candidate	Votes	%
Republican	Oscar S. Kvaalen (incumbent)	1,704	65.97%
Democratic	William A. "Bill" Martin	879	34.03%
Total votes		2,583	100.00%
Republican hold			

=== District 54 ===
Democratic primary results
Party	Candidate	Votes	%
Democratic	William M. "Willie" Day (incumbent)	857	100.00%
Total votes		857	100.00%

Republican primary results
Party	Candidate	Votes	%
Republican	Vernon C. Heinrich	451	100.00%
Total votes		451	100.00%

General election results
Party	Candidate	Votes	%
Democratic	William M. "Willie" Day (incumbent)	1,863	60.64%
Republican	Vernon C. Heinrich	1,209	39.36%
Total votes		3,072	100.00%
Democratic hold			

=== District 55 ===
Democratic primary results
Party	Candidate	Votes	%
Democratic	Gordon W. Russell	721	100.00%
Total votes		721	100.00%

Republican primary results
Party	Candidate	Votes	%
Republican	L. E. "Gene" Wood (incumbent)	575	100.00%
Total votes		575	100.00%

General election results
Party	Candidate	Votes	%
Republican	L. E. "Gene" Wood (incumbent)	1,280	50.87%
Democratic	Gordon W. Russell	1,236	49.13%
Total votes		2,516	100.00%
Republican hold			

=== District 56 ===
Democratic primary results
Party	Candidate	Votes	%
Democratic	Randal D. Hanson	796	100.00%
Total votes		796	100.00%

Republican primary results
Party	Candidate	Votes	%
Republican	Harold A. Wyrick (incumbent)	907	100.00%
Total votes		907	100.00%

General election results
Party	Candidate	Votes	%
Republican	Harold A. Wyrick (incumbent)	1,522	52.57%
Democratic	Randal D. Hanson	1,373	47.43%
Total votes		2,895	100.00%
Republican hold			

=== District 57 ===
Republican primary results
Party	Candidate	Votes	%
Republican	Carl M. Smith (incumbent)	729	100.00%
Total votes		729	100.00%

General election results
Party	Candidate	Votes	%
Republican	Carl M. Smith (incumbent)	1,922	100.00%
Total votes		1,922	100.00%
Republican hold			

=== District 58 ===
Democratic primary results
Party	Candidate	Votes	%
Democratic	Thomas R. Conroy (incumbent)	939	100.00%
Total votes		939	100.00%

General election results
Party	Candidate	Votes	%
Democratic	Thomas R. Conroy (incumbent)	2,218	100.00%
Total votes		2,218	100.00%
Democratic hold			

=== District 59 ===
Democratic primary results
Party	Candidate	Votes	%
Democratic	Esther G. Bengtson (incumbent)	691	100.00%
Total votes		691	100.00%

Republican primary results
Party	Candidate	Votes	%
Republican	Harold M. Wilmot	403	100.00%
Total votes		403	100.00%

General election results
Party	Candidate	Votes	%
Democratic	Esther G. Bengtson (incumbent)	1,889	63.90%
Republican	Harold M. Wilmot	1,067	36.10%
Total votes		2,956	100.00%
Democratic hold			

=== District 60 ===
Democratic primary results
Party	Candidate	Votes	%
Democratic	Gene Frates (incumbent)	415	50.24%
Democratic	Martin B. Kitzman	219	26.51%
Democratic	Charles J. Denison	192	23.24%
Total votes		826	100.00%

Republican primary results
Party	Candidate	Votes	%
Republican	Franklin "Les" Kitselman	457	60.61%
Republican	Michael R. Atraqchi	297	39.39%
Total votes		754	100.00%

General election results
Party	Candidate	Votes	%
Democratic	Gene Frates (incumbent)	1,852	50.29%
Republican	Franklin "Les" Kitselman	1,831	49.71%
Total votes		3,683	100.00%
Democratic hold			

=== District 61 ===
Democratic primary results
Party	Candidate	Votes	%
Democratic	Robert Dozier	356	56.69%
Democratic	Rodney L. Garcia	272	43.31%
Total votes		628	100.00%

Republican primary results
Party	Candidate	Votes	%
Republican	John B. Fine	223	100.00%
Total votes		223	100.00%

General election results
Party	Candidate	Votes	%
Democratic	Robert Dozier	833	50.33%
Republican	John B. Fine	822	49.67%
Total votes		1,655	100.00%
Democratic hold			

=== District 62 ===
Democratic primary results
Party	Candidate	Votes	%
Democratic	Harold E. Gerke (incumbent)	321	59.23%
Democratic	Patrick Novasio	221	40.77%
Total votes		542	100.00%

Republican primary results
Party	Candidate	Votes	%
Republican	Robert E. Glennen	328	100.00%
Total votes		328	100.00%

General election results
Party	Candidate	Votes	%
Democratic	Harold E. Gerke (incumbent)	908	49.48%
Republican	Robert E. Glennen	730	39.78%
Independent	Steve Trenka	197	10.74%
Total votes		1,835	100.00%
Democratic hold			

=== District 63 ===
Democratic primary results
Party	Candidate	Votes	%
Democratic	Roger Vanlandingham	281	100.00%
Total votes		281	100.00%

Republican primary results
Party	Candidate	Votes	%
Republican	Harrison G. Fagg (incumbent)	797	78.75%
Republican	Gary B. Fredericks	215	21.25%
Total votes		1,012	100.00%

General election results
Party	Candidate	Votes	%
Republican	Harrison G. Fagg (incumbent)	1,874	71.75%
Democratic	Roger Vanlandingham	738	28.25%
Total votes		2,612	100.00%
Republican hold			

=== District 64 ===
Democratic primary results
Party	Candidate	Votes	%
Democratic	Daniel H. Henning	373	100.00%
Total votes		373	100.00%

Republican primary results
Party	Candidate	Votes	%
Republican	Jack Ramirez (incumbent)	1,416	100.00%
Total votes		1,416	100.00%

General election results
Party	Candidate	Votes	%
Republican	Jack Ramirez (incumbent)	3,182	80.70%
Democratic	Daniel H. Henning	761	19.30%
Total votes		3,943	100.00%
Republican hold			

=== District 65 ===
Democratic primary results
Party	Candidate	Votes	%
Democratic	Russell K. Fillner	521	100.00%
Total votes		521	100.00%

Republican primary results
Party	Candidate	Votes	%
Republican	Howard C. Porter (incumbent)	882	100.00%
Total votes		882	100.00%

General election results
Party	Candidate	Votes	%
Republican	Howard C. Porter (incumbent)	1,860	64.67%
Democratic	Russell K. Fillner	1,016	35.33%
Total votes		2,876	100.00%
Republican hold			

=== District 66 ===
Democratic primary results
Party	Candidate	Votes	%
Democratic	Gerald R. Kessler (incumbent)	466	57.89%
Democratic	Gerald T. Dunbar	339	42.11%
Total votes		805	100.00%

Republican primary results
Party	Candidate	Votes	%
Republican	A. B. Guthrie	501	100.00%
Total votes		501	100.00%

General election results
Party	Candidate	Votes	%
Democratic	Gerald R. Kessler (incumbent)	1,445	55.19%
Republican	A. B. Guthrie	1,173	44.81%
Total votes		2,618	100.00%
Democratic hold			

=== District 67 ===
Democratic primary results
Party	Candidate	Votes	%
Democratic	Polly Holmes (incumbent)	469	53.60%
Democratic	Neal C. Kirkness	406	46.40%
Total votes		875	100.00%

Republican primary results
Party	Candidate	Votes	%
Republican	Thomas E. "Tom" Hannah	329	100.00%
Total votes		329	100.00%

General election results
Party	Candidate	Votes	%
Democratic	Polly Holmes (incumbent)	1,483	50.93%
Republican	Thomas E. "Tom" Hannah	1,429	49.07%
Total votes		2,912	100.00%
Democratic hold			

=== District 68 ===
Democratic primary results
Party	Candidate	Votes	%
Democratic	Herb Huennekens (incumbent)	622	72.75%
Democratic	Mabel E. Trenka	233	27.25%
Total votes		855	100.00%

Republican primary results
Party	Candidate	Votes	%
Republican	George W. Swords II	425	100.00%
Total votes		425	100.00%

General election results
Party	Candidate	Votes	%
Democratic	Herb Huennekens (incumbent)	1,816	65.37%
Republican	George W. Swords II	962	34.63%
Total votes		2,778	100.00%
Democratic hold			

=== District 69 ===
Democratic primary results
Party	Candidate	Votes	%
Democratic	Wes Teague (incumbent)	374	58.16%
Democratic	Ed Dobson	269	41.84%
Total votes		643	100.00%

Republican primary results
Party	Candidate	Votes	%
Republican	Gladys A. DuMond	186	100.00%
Total votes		186	100.00%

General election results
Party	Candidate	Votes	%
Democratic	Wes Teague (incumbent)	1,322	69.29%
Republican	Gladys A. DuMond	586	30.71%
Total votes		1,908	100.00%
Democratic hold			

=== District 70 ===
Democratic primary results
Party	Candidate	Votes	%
Democratic	J. Melvin "Mel" Williams (incumbent)	981	100.00%
Total votes		981	100.00%

Republican primary results
Party	Candidate	Votes	%
Republican	Terence J. Keating	392	100.00%
Total votes		392	100.00%

General election results
Party	Candidate	Votes	%
Democratic	J. Melvin "Mel" Williams (incumbent)	1,880	61.04%
Republican	Terence J. Keating	1,200	38.96%
Total votes		3,080	100.00%
Democratic hold			

=== District 71 ===
Democratic primary results
Party	Candidate	Votes	%
Democratic	Martha S. Herlevi	1,641	100.00%
Total votes		1,641	100.00%

Republican primary results
Party	Candidate	Votes	%
Republican	James H. "Jim" Burnett (incumbent)	562	100.00%
Total votes		562	100.00%

General election results
Party	Candidate	Votes	%
Republican	James H. "Jim" Burnett (incumbent)	1,928	53.90%
Democratic	Martha S. Herlevi	1,649	46.10%
Total votes		3,577	100.00%
Republican hold			

=== District 72 ===
Democratic primary results
Party	Candidate	Votes	%
Democratic	Vicki Johnson	1,138	100.00%
Total votes		1,138	100.00%

Republican primary results
Party	Candidate	Votes	%
Republican	Jean McLane (incumbent)	776	100.00%
Total votes		776	100.00%

General election results
Party	Candidate	Votes	%
Democratic	Vicki Johnson	2,019	53.36%
Republican	Jean McLane (incumbent)	1,765	46.64%
Total votes		3,784	100.00%
Democratic gain from Republican			

=== District 73 ===
Republican primary results
Party	Candidate	Votes	%
Republican	Orval S. Ellison (incumbent)	1,816	100.00%
Total votes		1,816	100.00%

General election results
Party	Candidate	Votes	%
Republican	Orval S. Ellison (incumbent)	3,124	100.00%
Total votes		3,124	100.00%
Republican hold			

=== District 74 ===
Democratic primary results
Party	Candidate	Votes	%
Democratic	Dan Yardley	653	57.08%
Democratic	Warren W. Harper Sr.	491	42.92%
Total votes		1,144	100.00%

Republican primary results
Party	Candidate	Votes	%
Republican	Edith E. Cox (incumbent)	812	100.00%
Total votes		812	100.00%

General election results
Party	Candidate	Votes	%
Democratic	Dan Yardley	1,619	52.51%
Republican	Edith E. Cox (incumbent)	1,464	47.49%
Total votes		3,083	100.00%
Democratic gain from Republican			

=== District 75 ===
Republican primary results
Party	Candidate	Votes	%
Republican	Robert A. Ellerd (incumbent)	1,265	100.00%
Total votes		1,265	100.00%

General election results
Party	Candidate	Votes	%
Republican	Robert A. Ellerd (incumbent)	3,006	100.00%
Total votes		3,006	100.00%
Republican hold			

=== District 76 ===
Democratic primary results
Party	Candidate	Votes	%
Democratic	John P. Scully (incumbent)	648	100.00%
Total votes		648	100.00%

General election results
Party	Candidate	Votes	%
Democratic	John P. Scully (incumbent)	2,153	100.00%
Total votes		2,153	100.00%
Democratic hold			

=== District 77 ===
Democratic primary results
Party	Candidate	Votes	%
Democratic	Donald R. Bianchi	332	35.36%
Democratic	Donald R. Reichmuth	262	27.90%
Democratic	Michael M. Nash	203	21.62%
Democratic	Bob Rice	142	15.12%
Total votes		939	100.00%

Republican primary results
Party	Candidate	Votes	%
Republican	Kenneth L. Nordtvedt Jr.	437	100.00%
Total votes		437	100.00%

General election results
Party	Candidate	Votes	%
Republican	Kenneth L. Nordtvedt Jr.	1,362	53.75%
Democratic	Donald R. Bianchi	1,172	46.25%
Total votes		2,534	100.00%
Republican gain from Democratic			

=== District 78 ===
Democratic primary results
Party	Candidate	Votes	%
Democratic	John Vincent (incumbent)	715	100.00%
Total votes		715	100.00%

General election results
Party	Candidate	Votes	%
Democratic	John Vincent (incumbent)	1,970	100.00%
Total votes		1,970	100.00%
Democratic hold			

=== District 79 ===
Republican primary results
Party	Candidate	Votes	%
Republican	Walter R. Sales	440	39.15%
Republican	Leo Clinton	375	33.36%
Republican	Norman C. Wheeler	309	27.49%
Total votes		1,124	100.00%

General election results
Party	Candidate	Votes	%
Republican	Walter R. Sales	2,303	100.00%
Total votes		2,303	100.00%
Republican hold			

=== District 80 ===
Democratic primary results
Party	Candidate	Votes	%
Democratic	Vincent D. Yannone	1,246	61.20%
Democratic	Joe Geraghty	790	38.80%
Total votes		2,036	100.00%

Republican primary results
Party	Candidate	Votes	%
Republican	Robert L. "Bob" Marks (incumbent)	524	100.00%
Total votes		524	100.00%

General election results
Party	Candidate	Votes	%
Republican	Robert L. "Bob" Marks (incumbent)	2,005	53.27%
Democratic	Vincent D. Yannone	1,759	46.73%
Total votes		3,764	100.00%
Republican hold			

=== District 81 ===
Republican primary results
Party	Candidate	Votes	%
Republican	Kerry Keyser (incumbent)	829	53.90%
Republican	Marie McAlear	709	46.10%
Total votes		1,538	100.00%

General election results
Party	Candidate	Votes	%
Republican	Kerry Keyser (incumbent)	2,642	100.00%
Total votes		2,642	100.00%
Republican hold			

=== District 82 ===
Democratic primary results
Party	Candidate	Votes	%
Democratic	Bill Hand (incumbent)	509	54.38%
Democratic	Tedd Stanisich	427	45.62%
Total votes		936	100.00%

General election results
Party	Candidate	Votes	%
Democratic	Bill Hand (incumbent)	2,250	100.00%
Total votes		2,250	100.00%
Democratic hold			

=== District 83 ===
Democratic primary results
Party	Candidate	Votes	%
Democratic	Mike Cooney (incumbent)	1,577	62.41%
Democratic	Marko Lucich	950	37.59%
Total votes		2,527	100.00%

General election results
Party	Candidate	Votes	%
Democratic	Mike Cooney (incumbent)	2,642	100.00%
Total votes		2,642	100.00%
Democratic hold			

=== District 84 ===
Democratic primary results
Party	Candidate	Votes	%
Democratic	Joe Quilici (incumbent)	1,274	68.90%
Democratic	Nancy Wanders	575	31.10%
Total votes		1,849	100.00%

General election results
Party	Candidate	Votes	%
Democratic	Joe Quilici (incumbent)	1,871	100.00%
Total votes		1,871	100.00%
Democratic hold			

=== District 85 ===
Democratic primary results
Party	Candidate	Votes	%
Democratic	Kathleen McBride	793	39.06%
Democratic	James T. Mular (incumbent)	785	38.67%
Democratic	Karen M. Plessas	452	22.27%
Total votes		2,030	100.00%

General election results
Party	Candidate	Votes	%
Democratic	Kathleen McBride	1,989	100.00%
Total votes		1,989	100.00%
Democratic hold			

=== District 86 ===
Democratic primary results
Party	Candidate	Votes	%
Democratic	Robert J. "Bob" Pavlovich	773	46.45%
Democratic	Jim Courtney (incumbent)	653	39.24%
Democratic	Larry T. Hihnala	238	14.30%
Total votes		1,664	100.00%

General election results
Party	Candidate	Votes	%
Democratic	Robert J. "Bob" Pavlovich	1,656	100.00%
Total votes		1,656	100.00%
Democratic hold			

=== District 87 ===
Democratic primary results
Party	Candidate	Votes	%
Democratic	Fred "Fritz" Daily	823	44.32%
Democratic	Tom Christie	765	41.20%
Democratic	Vince "Vin" Downing	202	10.88%
Democratic	Rulon Crosby	67	3.61%
Total votes		1,857	100.00%

Republican primary results
Party	Candidate	Votes	%
Republican	Earl J. "Si" Holman	61	100.00%
Total votes		61	100.00%

General election results
Party	Candidate	Votes	%
Democratic	Fred "Fritz" Daily	2,071	83.64%
Republican	Earl J. "Si" Holman	405	16.36%
Total votes		2,476	100.00%
Democratic hold			

=== District 88 ===
Democratic primary results
Party	Candidate	Votes	%
Democratic	Dan W. Harrington (incumbent)	1,085	64.35%
Democratic	Nick F. Simon	601	35.65%
Total votes		1,686	100.00%

General election results
Party	Candidate	Votes	%
Democratic	Dan W. Harrington (incumbent)	1,701	100.00%
Total votes		1,701	100.00%
Democratic hold			

=== District 89 ===
Democratic primary results
Party	Candidate	Votes	%
Democratic	Joe F. Kanduch Sr. (incumbent)	574	47.17%
Democratic	Archie W. McPhail Jr.	338	27.77%
Democratic	Patrick E. "Pudgo" Laughlin	305	25.06%
Total votes		1,217	100.00%

General election results
Party	Candidate	Votes	%
Democratic	Joe F. Kanduch Sr. (incumbent)	1,405	100.00%
Total votes		1,405	100.00%
Democratic hold			

=== District 90 ===
Democratic primary results
Party	Candidate	Votes	%
Democratic	William "Red" Menahan (incumbent)	1,383	76.71%
Democratic	Robert G. "Bob" Forsman	420	23.29%
Total votes		1,803	100.00%

General election results
Party	Candidate	Votes	%
Democratic	William "Red" Menahan (incumbent)	2,214	100.00%
Total votes		2,214	100.00%
Democratic hold			

=== District 91 ===
Democratic primary results
Party	Candidate	Votes	%
Democratic	Ken Robbins	1,133	74.30%
Democratic	Robert G. Edmonds	392	25.70%
Total votes		1,525	100.00%

Republican primary results
Party	Candidate	Votes	%
Republican	John W. Robinson (Note: Although John W. Robinson won the primary, Mrs. Roy Cranmore was the Republican nominee in the general election.)	452	50.79%
Republican	Mrs. Roy Cranmore	438	49.21%
Total votes		890	100.00%

General election results
Party	Candidate	Votes	%
Democratic	Ken Robbins	2,118	55.14%
Republican	Mrs. Roy Cranmore	1,723	44.86%
Total votes		3,841	100.00%
Democratic hold			

=== District 92 ===
Democratic primary results
Party	Candidate	Votes	%
Democratic	Dennis H. Day	775	56.53%
Democratic	Steven E. McCarter	596	43.47%
Total votes		1,371	100.00%

Republican primary results
Party	Candidate	Votes	%
Republican	Bob Thoft	694	50.55%
Republican	Philip L. Baden	679	49.45%
Total votes		1,373	100.00%

General election results
Party	Candidate	Votes	%
Republican	Bob Thoft	2,480	57.41%
Democratic	Dennis H. Day	1,840	42.59%
Total votes		4,320	100.00%
Republican hold			

=== District 93 ===
Republican primary results
Party	Candidate	Votes	%
Republican	Howard L. Ellis (incumbent)	615	100.00%
Total votes		615	100.00%

General election results
Party	Candidate	Votes	%
Republican	Howard L. Ellis (incumbent)	2,923	100.00%
Total votes		2,923	100.00%
Republican hold			

=== District 94 ===
Democratic primary results
Party	Candidate	Votes	%
Democratic	Daniel Kemmis	654	45.57%
Democratic	Jack Mudd	490	34.15%
Democratic	Kim Williams	291	20.28%
Total votes		1,435	100.00%

Republican primary results
Party	Candidate	Votes	%
Republican	Kermit R. Schwanke	161	100.00%
Total votes		161	100.00%

General election results
Party	Candidate	Votes	%
Democratic	Daniel Kemmis	1,719	63.15%
Republican	Kermit R. Schwanke	1,003	36.85%
Total votes		2,722	100.00%
Democratic hold			

=== District 95 ===
Democratic primary results
Party	Candidate	Votes	%
Democratic	Ann Mary Dussault (incumbent)	1,361	100.00%
Total votes		1,361	100.00%

General election results
Party	Candidate	Votes	%
Democratic	Ann Mary Dussault (incumbent)	2,416	100.00%
Total votes		2,416	100.00%
Democratic hold			

=== District 96 ===
Democratic primary results
Party	Candidate	Votes	%
Democratic	James Azzara	664	49.74%
Democratic	Cris Connick Volinkaty	337	25.24%
Democratic	Sam Wolfe	334	25.02%
Total votes		1,335	100.00%

Republican primary results
Party	Candidate	Votes	%
Republican	Walter G. Taylor	190	100.00%
Total votes		190	100.00%

General election results
Party	Candidate	Votes	%
Democratic	James Azzara	1,677	66.44%
Republican	Walter G. Taylor	847	33.56%
Total votes		2,524	100.00%
Democratic hold			

=== District 97 ===
Democratic primary results
Party	Candidate	Votes	%
Democratic	Steve Waldron (incumbent)	606	59.94%
Democratic	Roy Burditt	405	40.06%
Total votes		1,011	100.00%

Republican primary results
Party	Candidate	Votes	%
Republican	Fred O. Brauer	185	100.00%
Total votes		185	100.00%

General election results
Party	Candidate	Votes	%
Democratic	Steve Waldron (incumbent)	1,462	68.67%
Republican	Fred O. Brauer	667	31.33%
Total votes		2,129	100.00%
Democratic hold			

=== District 98 ===
Democratic primary results
Party	Candidate	Votes	%
Democratic	James Andrew Hensel	829	100.00%
Total votes		829	100.00%

Republican primary results
Party	Candidate	Votes	%
Republican	R. Budd Gould (incumbent)	427	100.00%
Total votes		427	100.00%

General election results
Party	Candidate	Votes	%
Republican	R. Budd Gould (incumbent)	2,049	74.84%
Democratic	James Andrew Hensel	689	25.16%
Total votes		2,738	100.00%
Republican hold			

=== District 99 ===
Democratic primary results
Party	Candidate	Votes	%
Democratic	George Ladanye	1,086	100.00%
Total votes		1,086	100.00%

Republican primary results
Party	Candidate	Votes	%
Republican	Earl C. Lory (incumbent)	819	100.00%
Total votes		819	100.00%

General election results
Party	Candidate	Votes	%
Republican	Earl C. Lory (incumbent)	2,228	61.21%
Democratic	George Ladanye	1,412	38.79%
Total votes		3,640	100.00%
Republican hold			

=== District 100 ===
Democratic primary results
Party	Candidate	Votes	%
Democratic	John M. Seeberger	1,044	100.00%
Total votes		1,044	100.00%

Republican primary results
Party	Candidate	Votes	%
Republican	Ralph S. Eudaily (incumbent)	549	100.00%
Total votes		549	100.00%

General election results
Party	Candidate	Votes	%
Republican	Ralph S. Eudaily (incumbent)	2,016	60.81%
Democratic	John M. Seeberger	1,299	39.19%
Total votes		3,315	100.00%
Republican hold			

== See also ==
- 1978 United States elections
- 1978 United States Senate election in Montana
- 1978 United States House of Representatives elections in Montana
- 1978 Montana Senate election
