= List of speakers of the Montana House of Representatives =

The following is a list of speakers of the Montana House of Representatives since statehood.

#	Name	Party	Term in office	Session(s)
1	Charles Blakely	Democratic	1889–1890	1st
1	Aaron Witter	Republican	1889–1890	1st
2	Harry Comly	Democratic	1891–1892	2nd
3	Thomas Matthews	Populist	1893–1894	3rd
4	Wilbra Swett	Republican	1895–1896	4th
5	Jacob Kennedy	Democratic	1897–1898	5th
6	Henry Stiff	Democratic	1899–1900	6th
7	Frank Corbett	Democratic	1901–1902	7th
8	Benjamin F. White	Republican	1903–1904	8th
9	Wyllis Hedges	Republican	1905–1906	9th
10	E. W. King	Republican	1907–1908	10th
11	W. W. McDowell	Democratic	1909–1912	11th 12th
12	Alexander MacDonald	Democratic	1913–1914	13th
13	George Ramsey	Democratic	1915–1916	14th
14	James F. O'Connor	Democratic	1917–1918	15th
15	O. W. Belden	Republican	1919–1920	16th
16	Fred L. Gibson	Republican	1921–1922	17th
17	Calvin Crumbaker	Republican	1923–1924	18th
18	Ralph Bricker	Republican	1925–1926	19th
19	Glenn Davis	Republican	1927–1928	20th
(18)	Ralph Bricker	Republican	1929–1930	21st
20	W. R. Flachsenhar	Republican	1931–1932	22nd
21	Dennis Dellwo	Democratic	1933–1934	23rd
22	William P. Pilgeram	Democratic	1935–1936	24th
23	H. D. Rolph	Democratic	1937–1938	25th
24	D. M. Manning	Democratic	1939–1940	26th
25	E. J. Stromnes	Democratic	1941–1942	27th
26	George O'Connor	Republican	1943–1946	28th 29th
27	Charles Scofield	Republican	1947–1948	30th
28	Leo Graybill	Democratic	1949–1950	31st
29	Ory Armstrong	Republican	1951–1952	32nd
30	Dean Chaffin	Republican	1953–1954	33rd
(28)	Leo Graybill	Democratic	1955–1956	34th
31	Eugene Mahoney	Democratic	1957–1958	35th
32	John MacDonald	Democratic	1959–1960	36th
33	Clyde Hawks	Republican	1961–1962	37th
34	Frank W. Hazelbaker	Republican	1963–1964	38th
35	Ray Wayrynen	Democratic	1965–1966	39th
36	James Felt	Republican	1967–1968	40th
37	James P. Lucas	Republican	1969–1972	41st 42nd
38	Harold Gerke	Democratic	1973–1974	43rd
39	Pat McKittrick	Democratic	1975–1976	44th
40	John Driscoll	Democratic	1977–1978	45th
(38)	Harold Gerke	Democratic	1979–1980	46th
41	Bob Marks	Republican	1981–1982	47th
42	Dan Kemmis	Democratic	1983–1984	48th
43	John Vincent	Democratic	1985–1986	49th
(41)	Bob Marks	Republican	1987–1988	50th
(43)	John Vincent	Democratic	1989–1990	51st
44	Hal Harper	Democratic	1991–1992	52nd
45	John Mercer	Republican	1993–2000	53rd 54th 55th 56th
46	Dan McGee	Republican	2001–2002	57th
47	Doug Mood	Republican	2003–2004	58th
48	Gary Matthews	Democratic	2005–2006	59th
49	Scott Sales	Republican	2007–2008	60th
50	Bob Bergren	Democratic	2009–2010	61st
51	Mike Milburn	Republican	2011–2012	62nd
52	Mark Blasdel	Republican	2013–2014	63rd
53	Austin Knudsen	Republican	2015–2018	64th 65th
54	Greg Hertz	Republican	2019–2021	66th
55	Wylie Galt	Republican	2021–2023	67th
56	Matt Regier	Republican	2023–2025	68th
57	Brandon Ler	Republican	2025–present	69th

== See also ==
- List of Montana state legislatures
