= Senator Harp =

Senator Harp may refer to:

- John Harp (born 1952), Montana State Senate
- Seth Harp (born 1943), Georgia State Senate
- Thomas D. Harp (1824–1900), California State Senate
- Toni Harp (born 1947), Connecticut State Senate
