= John Vincent (Montana politician) =

American politician (born 1942)

Member of the Montana Public Service Commission from the 3rd district
- In office 2009–2013
- Preceded by: Bob Raney
- Succeeded by: Roger Koopman

Member of the Gallatin County Commission
- In office 2001–2006

Mayor of Bozeman, Montana
- In office 1994–1995
- Preceded by: Timothy Swanson
- Succeeded by: Don E. Stueck

Member of the Bozeman City Commission
- In office 1992–1995

43rd Speaker of the Montana House of Representatives
- In office 1985–1986
- Preceded by: Dan Kemmis
- Succeeded by: Bob Marks
- In office 1987–1988
- Preceded by: Bob Marks
- Succeeded by: Hal Harper
House positions
House Majority Leader
In office 1983–1984
Preceded by	Harrison Fagg
Succeeded by	Hal Harper
House Minority Leader
In office 1987–1988
Preceded by	Jack Ramirez
Succeeded by	Jack Ramirez
House Majority Whip
In office 1979–1980

Member of the Montana House of Representatives from the 80th district
- In office 1985–1990
- Preceded by: Bob Marks
- Succeeded by: Beverly Barnhart

Member of the Montana House of Representatives from the 78th district
- In office 1975–1984
- Preceded by: Office established
- Succeeded by: Norm Wallin

Personal details
- Born: John Chapin Vincent; September 16, 1942 New Haven, Connecticut, U.S.
- Died: June 15, 2025 (aged 82) Bozeman, Montana
- Party: Democratic
- Spouse: Peggy Vincent
- Children: Julia Vincent
- Education: Seattle University (BA); University of Montana; Montana State University
- Occupation: Teacher, educator, politician

John Chapin Vincent (September 16, 1942 – June 15, 2025) was an American politician in the state of Montana. He ran for house district 78 in the first election in Montana held after the state moved to single-member districts in 1974. He was elected and served in the Montana House of Representatives from 1975 to 1990. From 1985 to 1986 and 1989 to 1990, he was Speaker of the House. He also served as majority leader and minority leader for the 1983 and 1987 sessions respectively and majority whip in the 1979 session. After his legislative career, he served as the mayor of Bozeman, Montana from 1994 to 1995 and as a commissioner of Bozeman from 1992 to 1995. From 2001 to 2006, he was Commissioner of Gallatin County, Montana. He was elected to the Montana Public Service Commission in 2008, and served a four-year term.
