= Jim Waltermire =

American politician (1949–1988)

15th Secretary of State of Montana
- In office 1981 – April 8, 1988
- Preceded by: Frank Murray
- Succeeded by: Verner Bertelsen

Personal details
- Born: James Douglas Waltermire; February 15, 1949 Great Falls, Montana, U.S.
- Died: April 8, 1988 (aged 39) Helena, Montana, U.S.
- Party: Republican
- Occupation: Politician

James Douglas Waltermire (February 15, 1949 – April 8, 1988) was an American politician.

Born in Great Falls, Montana, Waltermire served on the Missoula County, Montana Board of Commissioners in 1977. In 1978, he lost the election to the United States House of Representatives on the Republican Party ticket. From 1981 until his death in 1988, Waltermire served as Montana Secretary of State. Waltermire died in an airplane crash near the Helena Regional Airport in Helena, Montana. Waltermire was seeking the Republican nomination for the office of the governor of Montana at the time of his death.
