= Arlene Becker =

American politician

Member of the Montana House of Representatives from the 52nd district
- In office January 6, 2003 – January 3, 2011
- Preceded by: Virginia Court

Personal details
- Born: December 27, 1948 (age 77) Rock Falls, Illinois
- Party: Democratic Party
- Spouse: Paul Russell Brown
- Education: Loyola University Chicago; Montana State University - Bozeman
- Profession: registered nurse, accountant

Arlene A. Becker (born 1948) is an American politician, Democratic Party former member of the Montana House of Representatives, representing District 52 from 2002. She earlier served from 1991 through 1992.
