= Dave Hagstrom =

American politician

Member of the Montana House of Representatives from the 52nd district
- In office January 5, 2015 – January 2, 2017
- Preceded by: Virginia Court
- Succeeded by: Jimmy Patelis

Member of the Montana House of Representatives from the 53rd district
- In office January 7, 2013 – January 5, 2015
- Preceded by: Elsie Arntzen
- Succeeded by: Sarah Laszloffy

Personal details
- Born: 1956 (age 69–70) Billings, Montana
- Party: Republican

Dave Hagstrom (born 1956) is an American politician. He is a member of the Montana House of Representatives from the 52nd District, serving since 2013. He is a member of the Republican party.
