= Virginia Court =

American politician

Member of the Montana House of Representatives 50th
- In office January 5, 2015 – January 7, 2019
- Preceded by: Dennis Lenz
- Succeeded by: Jade Bahr

Member of the Montana House of Representatives 52nd
- In office January 3, 2011 – January 5, 2015
- Preceded by: Arlene Becker
- Succeeded by: Dave Hagstrom

Personal details
- Born: Whitehall, Montana, U.S.
- Party: Democratic
- Education: Montana State University

Virginia Court is a Democratic member of the Montana Legislature. In 2010 she was elected to House District 52 which represents a portion of the Billings area. She was redistricted into House District 50 for the 2014 election. She did not run for reelection in 2018 due to term limits.
