= Jimmy Patelis =

American politician

Member of the Montana House of Representatives from the 52nd district
- In office January 4, 2021 – May 23, 2021
- Preceded by: Rodney Garcia
- Succeeded by: Sherry Essmann
- In office January 2, 2017 – January 7, 2019
- Preceded by: Dave Hagstrom
- Succeeded by: Rodney Garcia

Personal details
- Born: Bethlehem, Pennsylvania, U.S.
- Party: Republican
- Children: 4
- Education: Montana Technological University (BS)

Jimmy Patelis is an American politician who served as a Republican member of the Montana House of Representatives from the 52nd district. He was elected in November 2020, and assumed office on January 4, 2021. He was also elected in November 2016, and served in the Montana House of Representatives from 2017 to 2019.

== Early life and education ==
Patelis was born in Bethlehem, Pennsylvania. He received a football scholarship to Montana Technological University, where he earned a Bachelor of Science degree in society and technology.

== Career ==
Patelis worked as a probation officer for 25 years before retiring. He was elected to the Montana House of Representatives in November 2020 and assumed office on January 4, 2021, succeeding Rodney Garcia. He resigned in May 2021 after being appointed to the Montana Board of Pardons and Parole.
