= Sarah Laszloffy =

American politician from Montana

Member of the Montana House of Representatives from the 53rd district
- In office January 5, 2015 – January 2, 2017
- Preceded by: Dave Hagstrom
- Succeeded by: Dennis Lenz

Member of the Montana House of Representatives from the 57th district
- In office January 7, 2013 – January 5, 2015
- Preceded by: Dan Kennedy
- Succeeded by: Forrest Mandeville

Personal details
- Party: Republican

Sarah Laszloffy was a Republican member of the Montana Legislature. She was elected to House District 53 which represents the Billings area.

Laszloffy served as a Majority Whip of the House during the 2015-2016 session. She was also chair of the Education Committee.
