= Daniel Kemmis =

American politician

48th Mayor of Missoula
- In office January 1, 1990 – September 3, 1996
- Preceded by: Robert E. Lovegrove
- Succeeded by: Mike Kadas

42nd Speaker of the Montana House of Representatives
- In office 1983–1984
- Preceded by: Bob Marks
- Succeeded by: John Vincent

Member of the Montana House of Representatives
- In office 1974–1984

Personal details
- Born: December 5, 1945 (age 80) Fairview, Montana, U.S.
- Party: Democratic
- Spouse: Jean Larson
- Children: 4
- Education: Harvard University (AB); University of Montana (JD)

Daniel Kemmis (born December 5, 1945) is an American author and senior statesman. Kemmis is the founder and board chair of Beyond Party - Montana First. He was the minority leader and speaker of the Montana House of Representatives and mayor of Missoula, Montana. He has been active on many public and non-profit boards, especially in the field of philanthropy, where he served for many years on the boards of the Kettering Foundation, the Northwest Area Foundation and Philanthropy Northwest.

== Early life and education ==
Daniel Kemmis was born December 5, 1945, in Fairview, Montana. He received a Bachelor of Arts degree in government from Harvard University and a Juris Doctor from the Alexander Blewett III School of Law.

== Career ==
Kemmis was elected to the Montana House of Representatives in the 1974 general election. He eventually rose to be the speaker of the House in the 1983–1984 session. Kemmis was elected mayor of Missoula, Montana, in 1989 and re-elected in 1993.

Since retiring from politics, Kemmis has been active on many public and non-profit boards, especially in the field of philanthropy. He was a member of the boards of the Kettering Foundation, the Northwest Area Foundation, and Philanthropy Northwest.

== Books ==
- Community and the Politics of Place, University of Oklahoma Press, 1990. ISBN 0-8061-2227-7
- The Good City and the Good Life: Renewing the American Community, Houghton Mifflin, 1995. ISBN 0-395-68630-X
- This Sovereign Land: A New Vision for Governing the West, Island Press, 2001. ISBN 1-55963-842-7
- Citizens Uniting to Restore our Democracy, University of Oklahoma Press, 2020
