= Dennis Iverson (politician) =

American politician (born 1943)

Speaker pro tempore of the Montana House of Representatives
- In office 1987–1989
- Preceded by: Bob Marks Clancy (House Republican Leader)
- Succeeded by: Kelly Addy

Member of the Montana House of Representatives
- In office 1979–1989

Personal details
- Born: September 4, 1943 (age 82)
- Party: Republican
- Profession: Politician, rancher

Dennis Iverson (born September 4, 1943) is an American politician and rancher from Whitlash, Montana who served in the Montana House of Representatives from 1979 to 1989, representing Liberty County as a Republican. Iverson served as speaker pro tempore of the Montana House of Representatives from 1987 to 1989.

Montana House of Representatives
Preceded by —	Member of the Montana House of Representatives; 1979–1989	Succeeded by —
Montana House of Representatives
Preceded by —	Speaker pro tempore of the Montana House of Representatives; 1987–1989	Succeeded by —
