= Gary Matthews (politician) =

American politician

Member of the Montana House of Representatives
- In office 1998–2005

Personal details
- Born: February 10, 1951 (age 75) Miles City, Montana, U.S.
- Party: Democratic
- Education: AA, Miles Community College, 1976
- Alma mater: Miles Community College
- Occupation: businessman

Gary G. Matthews (born February 10, 1951) was the Speaker of the 59th Montana House of Representatives. He joined the United States Marine Corps before attending Miles Community College. He is a member of the Montana Democratic Party.

== Education ==
AA, Miles Community College, 1976

== Political Experience ==
- Representative, Montana State House of Representatives,
- 1998–present Former Speaker of the House,
- Montana State House of Representatives Member, Veterans A Redevelopment Project, 1999-2000
