= Dave Brown (Montana politician) =

American politician

Dave Brown (November 20, 1948 in Pompey's Pillar, Montana – October 23, 1998 in Madison, Wisconsin) was a member of the Montana House of Representatives.

He pled guilty in 1994 to five counts of failing to file federal income tax returns.

== Career ==
Brown was a member of the House of Representatives from 1981 to 1993.
