= John Mercer (American politician) =

American politician and attorney in the state of Montana

Member of the Montana House of Representatives
- In office 1984–2000

Personal details
- Born: January 21, 1957 (age 69) Missoula, Montana, U.S.
- Party: Republican
- Education: University of Montana; Northwestern University
- Occupation: Lawyer

John A. Mercer (born January 21, 1957) is an American politician and attorney in the state of Montana. He served in the Montana House of Representatives from 1984 to 2000. From 1993 to 1999 he served four terms as Speaker of the House, and in 1993 served as minority leader. He is the longest serving Speaker of the House of Montana in state history. After serving as chairman of the Montana Board of Regents, Mercer ended a considerable career in public service.

John Mercer is a recipient of the State Bar of Montana Distinguished Service Award and Community Service Award of the University of Montana.

From 1982 he has practiced law at Turnage Mercer & Wall PLLP; the firm founded by Montana Supreme Court Justice Jean Turnage. He attended the University of Montana and Northwestern University, earning his JD degree at the latter. He is admitted to practice before the Montana Supreme Court, Federal District Court of Montana, United States Circuit Court of Appeals (9th Circuit) and the Supreme Court of the United States.

May 10, 2024 Governor Greg Gianforte appointed John A. Mercer to serve on the Twentieth Judicial District Court, which includes Lake and Sanders Counties. Mercer filled the vacancy created by Twentieth Judicial District Judge Deborah Kim Christopher’s retirement.
