= Bob Thoft =

American politician

Member of the Montana House of Representatives from the 63rd district
- In office January 3, 1985 – January 3, 1993
- Preceded by: Harrison Fagg
- Succeeded by: Gary Mason

Member of the Montana House of Representatives from the 91st district
- In office January 3, 1979 – January 3, 1985
- Preceded by: John Driscoll
- Succeeded by: Bruce Simon

Personal details
- Born: Robert Erwin Thoft; July 13, 1929 Stevensville, Montana, U.S.
- Died: February 8, 2009 (aged 79) Stevensville, Montana, U.S.
- Party: Republican
- Spouse: Alice Eleanor Martin (m. 1950)

Robert Erwin Thoft (July 13, 1929 – February 8, 2009) was an American politician who served as a Republican member of the Montana House of Representatives from 1979 to 1993.
