= Kelly Addy =

American politician

Member of the Montana House of Representatives
- In office 1983–1990

Personal details
- Born: May 9, 1949 (age 77) Helena, Montana, U.S.
- Party: Democratic
- Education: Montana State University; Georgetown University Law Center
- Occupation: lawyer

John Kelly Addy (born May 9, 1949) is an American politician in the state of Montana. He served in the Montana House of Representatives from 1983 to 1989. In 1989, he served as Speaker pro tempore of the House. He is a lawyer.
