= Verner Bertelsen =

American politician (1918–2015)

16th Secretary of State of Montana
- In office April 1988 – January 1989
- Preceded by: Jim Waltermire
- Succeeded by: Mike Cooney

Member of the Montana House of Representatives
- In office 1975–1984

Personal details
- Born: Verner Laurits Bertelsen; July 19, 1918 Froid, Montana, U.S.
- Died: August 17, 2015 (aged 97)
- Party: Republican
- Occupation: Politician

Verner Laurits Bertelsen (July 19, 1918 – August 17, 2015) was an American politician from Montana.

Born in Froid, Roosevelt County, Montana, Bertelsen was appointed as Montana Secretary of State in April 1988 following the death of Jim Waltermire, who died in an airplane crash while campaigning for state governor. Bertelsen served until January 1989.

== Political career ==
Bertelsen served as a Powell County Commissioner from 1951 to 1957, and a Montana House Representative from 1975 to 1984. He was the chairman of the Local Government and Revenue Oversight Committee. Governor Ted Schwinden appointed Bertelsen to Secretary of State.
