= John Harp =

American politician

John G. Harp

Member of the Montana State Senate
- In office 1989–2000

Member of the Montana House of Representatives
- In office 1981–1988

Personal details
- Born: September 26, 1952 (age 73) Vancouver, Washington, U.S.
- Party: Republican
- Spouse: Kathy Harp
- Occupation: businessman, contractor

John George Harp (born September 26, 1952) is an American politician in the state of Montana. Harp served in the Montana House of Representatives from 1981 to 1988 and in the Montana State Senate from 1989 to 2000. He was majority leader of the Senate from 1995 to 1999.

== Personal life ==
Harp's wife is Kathy Harp. Harp and his family live in Kalispell, Montana. Harp's son, Zachariah Harp, has been linked by the Southern Poverty Law Center, Media Matters for America and the Montana Human Rights Network to white supremacy movements and organizations.
