= Jack Uhde =

American politician

Jack B. Uhde

Member of the Montana House of Representatives from the 17th district
- In office 1977–1981
- Preceded by: James A. Sloan
- Succeeded by: Alison Conn

Personal details
- Born: 1957 (age 68–69)
- Party: Democratic
- Spouse: Mary
- Education: University of Montana
- Profession: real estate sales

Jack Brian Uhde (born 1957) is an American politician former in the state of Montana. In 1976, he was elected as a Democrat to the Montana House of Representatives, representing District 17 (Kalispell), and he served until 1980.

Uhde was elected at the age of 18, and is the youngest person ever elected to the Montana Legislature. He defeated incumbent representative James A. Sloan for the Democratic nomination. At the time, he was a student at Flathead Valley Community College in public administration and employed at a local store in Kalispell. He also held jobs as a janitor and a cook, and in real estate sales. He graduated from Flathead High School in 1975.

During his time in the House, he served on the Judiciary Committee, Highways Committee, and as vice-chairman of the Education Committee. He earned a bachelor's degree in political science in 1979 from the University of Montana, while serving in the House. He was elected to a second term in 1978, and announced intentions to run for a third term in January 1980, but withdrew later that year in September, citing a desire to attend graduate school and join his wife in California where she would attend law school. He was succeeded by Alison Conn, who was 19 years old at the time of her election.
