= Aubyn Curtiss =

American politician from Montana

Member of the Montana House of Representatives
- In office 1977–1983
- In office 1995–2002

Member of the Montana State Senate
- In office 2002–2011

Personal details
- Born: July 1, 1925 Park City, Montana, U.S.
- Died: August 9, 2017 (aged 92) near Fortine, Montana
- Party: Republican
- Education: University of California Los Angeles
- Occupation: broker, tree buyer

Aubyn Curtiss (July 1, 1925 – August 9, 2017) was an American politician in the state of Montana. She served in the Montana House of Representatives and Montana State Senate.
