= Ann Mary Dussault =

American politician

Member of the Montana House of Representatives
- In office 1974–1981

Personal details
- Born: May 23, 1946 (age 80) Missoula, Montana, U.S.
- Party: Democratic
- Spouse: Diane Sands
- Education: Michigan State University; University of Montana

Ann Mary Dussault (born May 23, 1946) is an American politician in the state of Montana. She served in the Montana House of Representatives from 1974 to 1981. She later served as a county official for Missoula County, Montana.
