= Rodney Garcia =

American politician (born 1954)

Member of the Montana House of Representatives from the 52nd district
- In office January 7, 2019 – January 4, 2021
- Preceded by: Jimmy Patelis
- Succeeded by: Jimmy Patelis

Personal details
- Born: January 27, 1954 (age 72) Billings, Montana, U.S.
- Party: Republican

Rodney Garcia (born January 27, 1954) is an American politician who served as a member of the Montana House of Representatives from 2019 to 2021. He represented the 52nd district, which includes Billings, Montana. During his tenure, Garcia served on the Local Government Committee, State Administration Committee, and Transportation Committee.

In 2018, Garcia admitted to a newspaper that he'd previously been convicted of a charge related to a domestic dispute with his ex-wife, though he denied wrongdoing.

In 2019, in an interview for a militia news outlet, he referred to Child Protective Services as "kidnappers."

On January 31, 2020, at a Republican party gathering in Helena, he raised concerns about socialists inside the government. Speaking to a reporter after the event, he described socialists as "enemies of the free state" and claimed, "So actually in the Constitution of the United States (if) they are found guilty of being a socialist member you either go to prison or are shot." When asked to reflect on the appropriateness of his comment, he insisted, "I agree with my Constitution. That's what makes us free. We're not a democracy, we're a Republic Constitution." The Montana Republican Party condemned Garcia's comments as "reckless and un-American" and demanded Garcia's immediate resignation. Garcia responded that the "only way I would give my resignation is if God asked me to." He also told reporters that he'd received threats from people who "want to shoot me," and he warned, "If you miss, I won't."

Later in 2020, Garcia ran for the 26th district seat of the Montana Senate. He lost to Chris Friedel in the Republican primary.
