= Glenn Roush =

American politician (1934–2020)

Member of the Montana Senate
- In office 1999–2011

Member of the Montana House of Representatives
- In office 1981–1984

Personal details
- Born: Glenn Arthur Roush; January 25, 1934 Helena, Montana
- Died: May 27, 2020 (aged 86) Columbia Falls, Montana
- Party: Democratic
- Education: Montana State University

Military service
- Branch/service: United States Army

Glenn Arthur Roush (January 25, 1934 – May 27, 2020) was an American politician who served in both chambers of the Montana Legislature.

== Early life and education ==
Roush was born in Helena, Montana and graduated from Cut Bank High School in Cut Bank, Montana in 1952. Roush attended Montana State University and served in the United States Army.

== Career ==
Roush worked for Montana Power Company (Northwestern Energy) and lived in Cut Bank, Montana with his wife and family. Roush served in the Montana House of Representatives from 1981 to 1984 and in the Montana Senate from 1999 to 2011 as a Democrat.

== Death ==
He died at the Montana Veterans Home in Columbia Falls, Montana.
