= Dan Harrington (politician) =

American politician (1938–2015)

Member of the Montana Senate from the 38th district
- In office 2000 -

Personal details
- Born: February 12, 1938 Butte, Montana, U.S.
- Died: September 21, 2015 (aged 77)
- Party: Democratic
- Spouse: Pat
- Education: Western Montana College
- Occupation: educator

Dan W. Harrington (February 12, 1938 – September 21, 2015) was an American politician who served as member of the Montana Senate, representing District 38 since 2000. He was President Pro Tempore. He was previously a member of the Montana House of Representatives from 1977 through 2001.

Harrington died on September 21, 2015, at the age of 77.
