= Jean McLane =

American politician (1926–2024)

Viola Jean McLane (1926 – November 3, 2024) was an American politician who served as a member of the Montana House of Representatives from 1977 to 1979 and again from 1981 until 1983.

== Life and career ==
McLane was born in 1926 on a family farm in Laurel, Montana, to Frank and Doris Baird. She married an optometrist, Harry McLane, with whom she had two children. McLane became involved in local civic organizations, including the Laurel Republican Women and the American Legion, before being elected to the Montana House of Representatives for two nonconsecutive terms. She later moved to Mesa, Arizona, following her husband's retirement. McLane died in Mesa, Arizona on November 3, 2024, at the age of 98.
