= Harrison Fagg =

American architect and politician (1931–2025)

Member of the Montana House of Representatives
- In office 1968–1984

Personal details
- Born: October 27, 1931 Billings, Montana, U.S.
- Died: March 29, 2025 (aged 93) Billings, Montana, U.S.
- Party: Republican
- Spouse: Darlene Fagg
- Relatives: Russell Fagg (son)
- Education: Montana State University, University of Oregon
- Occupation: Architect, politician

Harrison Grover Fagg (October 27, 1931 – March 29, 2025) was an American architect and politician in Montana, U.S.. Fagg was a former Republican member of Montana House of Representatives from 1968 to 1984. He was the majority leader in 1981. An architect, he attended Montana State University and the University of Oregon.

In 1952, Fagg married Darlene Bohling (1931–2012). Fagg died on March 29, 2025, at the age of 93.
