= Hal Harper =

American politician

Member of the Montana House of Representatives
- In office 1972–1974
- In office 1976–2000

Personal details
- Born: March 11, 1948 (age 78) Nashville, Tennessee, U.S.
- Party: Republican (?–1974); Democratic (1974–present)
- Education: University of Montana

Hal G. Harper (born March 11, 1948) is an American politician in the state of Montana. He served in the Montana House of Representatives from 1972 to 1974 and 1976 to 2000. In 1985 and 1989, he served as majority leader of the House, and in 1991 as Speaker of the House. He later served as an adviser to Montana Governor Brian Schweitzer. Harper is an alumnus of the University of Montana and has worked in construction.
