= Bob Marks =

American politician (1932–2023)

Member of the Montana House of Representatives
- In office 1969–1989

Personal details
- Born: January 11, 1932 Helena, Montana, U.S.
- Died: April 10, 2023 (aged 91) Clancy, Montana, U.S.
- Party: Republican
- Spouse: Barbara Myles
- Children: six

Robert L. Marks (January 11, 1932 – April 10, 2023) was an American politician who was a member of the Montana House of Representatives.

== Life and career ==
Marks, a Republican, resided in Clancy, Montana and served from 1969 to 1989. He was Minority Leader in 1977 and 1983, Speaker pro tempore in 1985, and Speaker of the House in 1981 and 1987. He was an alumnus of the University of Montana and Montana State University.

Marks died in Clancy, Montana, on April 10, 2023, at the age of 91.
