= Missoulian =

Newspaper in Missoula, Montana, US

- Type: Daily newspaper
- Format: Broadsheet
- Owner: Lee Enterprises
- Founder(s): Joseph Magee, W.H. Magee, and I. H. Morrison
- Publisher: Bill Merrill
- Editor: Laura Scheer
- Founded: September 15, 1870; 155 years ago, as the Missoula and Cedar Creek Pioneer
- Language: English
- Headquarters: Missoula, Montana
- Country: United States
- Circulation: 16,652 Daily (as of 2023)
- ISSN: 0746-4495
- OCLC number: 10049426
- Website: missoulian.com

The Missoulian is a daily newspaper printed in Missoula, Montana, United States. The newspaper has been owned by Lee Enterprises since 1959. The Missoulian is the largest published newspaper in Western Montana, and is distributed throughout the city of Missoula, and most of Western Montana.

== History ==
=== Early years ===
The Missoulian was established as the Missoula and Cedar Creek Pioneer on September 15, 1870, by the Magee Brothers and I. H. Morrison, under the Montana Publishing Company. Though strictly conservative politically, the paper was never intended to advance any particular "clique or party". Slightly less than a year after removing "Cedar Creek" from the name, the paper's name was trimmed to simply The Pioneer in November 1871, with W. J. McCormick, a prominent Montana politician and father of future Congressman Washington J. McCormick, as publisher. It served as a Democratic paper that was devoted to reporting on the development of western Montana. A month later, Frank H. Woody, who later became Missoula's first mayor, was named ad interim, and he lengthened the name to the Montana Pioneer. On February 8, 1873, Woody and his partner T. M. Chisholm purchased the paper and changed its name to The Missoulian. W. R. Turk replaced Chisholm and Woody sold out a year later, but the paper's name has more-or-less stayed the same until today. Turk died of tuberculosis in 1875, and the paper was published by Chauncey Barbour until August 15, 1879, when Duane J. Armstrong became editor and publisher. The newspaper offered only a weekend edition until 1891, when new owner A.B. Hammond converted it to a daily newspaper with Harrison Spaulding from the Missoula County Times as editor and publisher.

=== Republican era ===
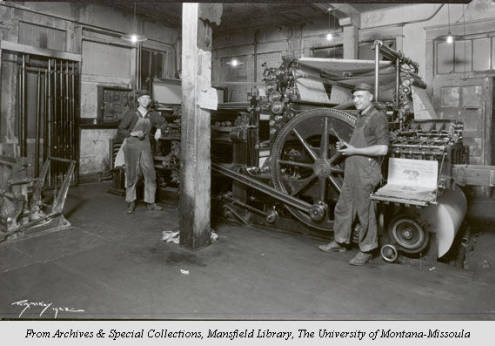
Daily Missoulian press room, 1923

Hammond's purchase of The Missoulian brought the newspaper into the republican fold and on the battle lines of the William A. Clark and Marcus Daly Copper Kings feud. Hammond was a lumber baron and business partner of Daly in the Montana Improvement Company, who saw the Democratic president, Grover Cleveland's public land policies as a detriment to his business. Hammond had become very wealthy over-logging unsurveyed public timberland and supplying lumber to the railroad and Daly's Anaconda Company's smelter. Hammond and his associates in Missoula convinced Daly to thwart Clark's 1888 bid for the Montana Territory's At-large congressional district and support Republican Thomas H. Carter instead. Despite Clark crying foul, Carter went on to win.

Daly's election maneuvering created a major rift between the Copper Kings, and the next year he became chairman of the Montana Democratic Party. He asked for Hammond's support and Hammond responded by delivering a Republican sweep of the Missoula delegation. This infuriated Daly, who declared war on Hammond and threatened to "make grass grow in the streets of Missoula". Several years later, as Montana's press was divided on whether to keep the state's capital in Clark's choice of Helena or move it Daly's company town of Anaconda, Hammond who was worried that further empowered Daly would weaken Missoula loaned The Missoulian to Clark's team, who derided Anaconda. "What has Anaconda ever done for Missoula, anyway? If Christ came to Anaconda he would be compelled to eat, sleep, drink and pray with Marcus Daly." Though the majority of Missoula County voted for Anaconda as capital, enough voted for Helena for it to win the statewide contest.

In 1900, Hammond began selling stock in the Missoulian to political rival Joseph M. Dixon, who later became a US Congressman, US Senator, and the state of Montana's seventh governor. In December 1906, Wilhelm's Magazine, The Coast, described the newspaper as "one of the best papers in the state of Montana and has the credit of being a strong paper in all matters pertaining to public and state affairs. It is large, well edited and a credit to Missoula." Dixon gained control over the paper in 1907, and brought in Arthur Stone, a former Anaconda Standard reporter and managing editor, as well as former Democratic state legislator, as editor. His experience helped further modernize the paper and expand its reach. The Republican Daily Missoulian (as it was called until 1961) was soon rivaled by the Democrat-leaning Missoula Herald, published by the Hassler Brothers and its successor, the Missoula Sentinel, that was purchased in 1912 (one year after its founding) by Richard Kilroy for the purpose of politically wounding Dixon, as he ran for re-election in the first year Senators were popularly elected. (*note. Though the 17th Amendment to the Constitution was not ratified until 1913, the Montana legislature provided for the direct election of US Senators in 1911, in anticipation of the amendment's ratification.) Dixon lost the election in a Democratic sweep and lost the paper for financial reasons, five years later.

=== Anaconda Copper ===
Montana's press in 1912 was almost entirely under the influence and control of the Anaconda Copper Mining Company, then known as "Amalgamated Copper Company" or, in a nod to its incredible clout in Montana politics and journalism, simply "The Company". The Missoulian was not a "Company paper"; according to Jerre Murphy, a former Amalgamated employee turned muckracker, it was the only major newspaper in Montana that was not. After his election defeat, Dixon turned the Missoulian against Amalgamated with scathing editorials and "objectionable" news. With Dixon refusing to sell the paper, the Company chose bribery, by offering Dixon the Missoula Sentinel that Dixon felt was splitting the city's advertising dollars. Dixon accepted, but only on the condition that he would be "fair" to Amalgamated in the press. Pressure on advertisers for new anti-Dixon competition and Amalgamated itself pulling its advertising dollars, as well as having the Milwaukee Road cancel complimentary papers that it had given to passengers, however, forced Dixon to sell. Two newspapermen from the Chicago Journal, Martin Hutchens and Lester L. Jones, purchased the Missoulian and were soon part of the "copper press" (i.e. a "Company paper" known for using its pages to promote the Company's views and for suppressing news it didn't want reported) and remained as such, until Anaconda Copper sold all its Montana newspapers to Lee Enterprises, in 1959.

=== Lee Enterprises ===
By the late 1950s, the Anaconda Company's newspaper model of toeing the company line and avoiding controversy had left the company's papers self-conscious and defensive to the point that Don Anderson commented in its appraisal of the newspapers that "They even refused to take a stand on the weather." When the papers were finally sold in 1959, only the Billings Gazette and Missoulian were profitable and in growing markets. Ultimately, the financial difficulties of the company's papers around the state may have helped Lee Enterprises, who faced competition from much larger organizations, such as the Cowles Media Company and the Ridder Corporation, purchase the newspaper block. Larger publishers were only interested in the two profitable papers, while the Anaconda Company insisted on selling the papers as a block, with an implicit guarantee that individual papers not be sold off to recoup losses. Also in Lee Enterprises' favor was that Don Anderson, publisher of the Wisconsin State Journal and later, president of Lee Newspapers in Montana, who in 2007 had the new University of Montana School of Journalism building named after him, was a Montana native who understood the political climate and had worked with Anaconda Company staff as a young reporter. He and Lee Enterprises' CEO, Phillip Adler, successfully purchased the papers despite not being the highest bidders with an agreement made in late May. The newspapers each announced the change in ownership with a "hello" on June 2, 1959, stressing that they would be accountable to the public and not their parent company.

While most of Lee Enterprises' new newspapers retained their leadership, the Missoulian was an exception, where Lloyd Schermer, son-in-law of Phillip Adler, took over as publisher.

In April 2023, at least three newsroom employees were laid off. Then starting July 11, 2023, the print edition of the newspaper was reduced to three days a week: Tuesday, Thursday and Saturday. Also, the newspaper transitioned from being delivered by a traditional newspaper delivery carrier to mail delivery by the U.S. Postal Service. In September 2024, the paper laid off its statewide enterprise editor after eliminating the position.

== Name and organization ==
The Missoulian began as the weekly Missoula and Cedar Creek Pioneer in 1870, before being renamed The Missoula Pioneer in 1871, but under the Montana Publishing Company. It was rechristened The Pioneer, later in 1871, by the Pioneer Publishing Company and then, The Montana Pioneer near the end of 1872, by Washington J. McCormick Sr., before being purchased by Frank Woody and T. M. Chisholm a couple months later and renamed The Weekly Missoulian. This remained its incarnation, through 1898.

The Weekly Missoulian continued for a year, from January 1899 to April 1900, as the still weekly The Missoulian, published by Bryan Bros. & Hauck. The weekly newspaper was then purchased by the Fruit-Grower Publishing Company and existed as a horticulture and general news publication, until the mid-1910s. In 1889, Harrison Spaulding founded The Morning Missoulian, as a daily (minus Monday) paper to complement The Weekly Missoulian. By 1893, this was changed to The Evening Missoulian, and then, to the Daily Missoulian, under the Missoula Publishing Company with Harrison Spaulding as editor. After brief separate ownership, both the daily and weekly Missoulians were reclaimed by the Missoula Publishing Company, with The Daily Missoulian lasting until 1961, when it was once again called the Missoulian, after being purchased by Lee Enterprises.

=== Timeline ===
Weekly

- Missoula and Cedar Creek Pioneer (September 1870)
- The Missoula Pioneer (January 1871)
- The Pioneer (November 1871)
- The Montana Pioneer (December 1872)
- The Weekly Missoulian (February 1873)
- The Missoulian (January 1899)
- Edwards' Fruit Grower & Farmer (December 1901)
- Semi-weekly Missoulian (September 1902)
- Weekly Missoulian (January 1904 – 1915)

Daily

- The Morning Missoulian (1889)
- The Evening Missoulian (February 1893)
- Daily Missoulian (August 1894)
- The Missoulian (May 1900)
- The Daily Missoulian (November 1904)
- The Missoulian (June 1910)
- The Daily Missoulian (March 1915)
- Missoulian (September 1961)
