= John M. Keith =

American politician (1859–1929)

John Martin Keith
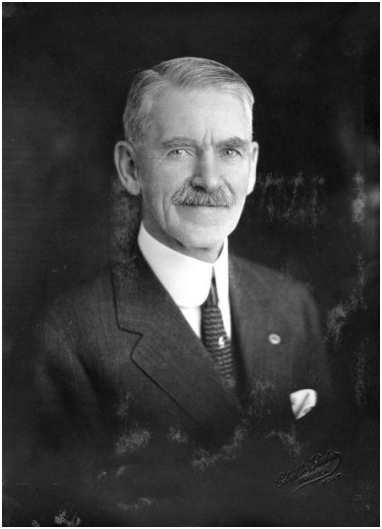

9th Mayor of Missoula
- In office May 4, 1891 – May 26, 1892
- Preceded by: William Kennedy
- Succeeded by: Frank G. Higgins

12th Mayor of Missoula
- In office May 6, 1895 – May 2, 1897
- Preceded by: Henry W. McLaughlin
- Succeeded by: Frederick C. Webster

18th Mayor of Missoula
- In office May 6, 1907 – May 2, 1909
- Preceded by: Fred C. Morgan
- Succeeded by: Andrew Logan

Personal details
- Born: June 5, 1859 New Brunswick, Canada
- Died: July 8, 1929 (aged 70) Missoula, Montana, United States
- Spouse(s): 1st - Harriet Beckwith (1890 - 1914); 2nd - R. A. Roderick (1918)
- Profession: Clerk, Banker, Mayor

John Martin Keith (June 5, 1859 – July 8, 1929) was a clerk and banker who was the only person to serve three nonconsecutive terms as mayor of Missoula, Montana.

== Early and personal life ==
Keith was born in rural New Brunswick, British North America on June 5, 1859, where he was raised on a farm and educated in the local public school system. After graduating, Keith began work in the mercantile business for several years before moving to Missoula, Montana at the age of 22.

== Missoula Mercantile ==
Keith arrived in Missoula in 1881 and began work as a clerk for Eddy, Hammond & Company, which was led by Keith's uncle Andrew B. Hammond, also of New Brunswick. In 1885, the store was incorporated as the Missoula Mercantile Company and was Montana's largest wholesale and retail store. Keith would be promoted to office manager before leaving in 1888.

== Banking ==
Hammond and Edward L. Bonner had been investing in Christopher P. Higgins' Missoula National Bank, the oldest Bank Charter in Montana, since 1881. When Higgins was forced to resign as bank president in 1888, the next two presidents also resigned after five and six months respectively. Marcus Daly then became president with Hammond as vice president and Keith as Cashier.

Hammond became president of the bank in 1893 and renamed it the First National Bank of Missoula. Keith became vice president and the chief executive in charge of its affairs until 1910.

In February, 1910, Keith became the first president of the reorganized Missoula Trust & Savings Bank. He simultaneously served as president of the First National Bank at Plains and a member of the Hammond Lumber Company of San Francisco. Additionally, Keith held business interests in Spokane, Washington, was secretary of the South Missoula Land Company, vice president of the Missoula Real Estate Association, and was a member of the school board, library board, Mason, and the Elks.

== Mayor ==
Keith was elected mayor three separate times without opposition on a citizens ticket, so as to be free from partisan bias. He was elected as Missoula's 9th mayor on May 4, 1891, and served for 12 months; he was elected as Missoula's 12th mayor on May 6, 1895, and served for 24 months; and he was elected as Missoula's 18th mayor on May 6, 1907, and served another 24 months.

As mayor, he attended the laying of the cornerstone of what was to become Montana's largest church, the St. Francis Xavier Church, along with Montana Governor Joseph Toole.

== John M. Keith House ==
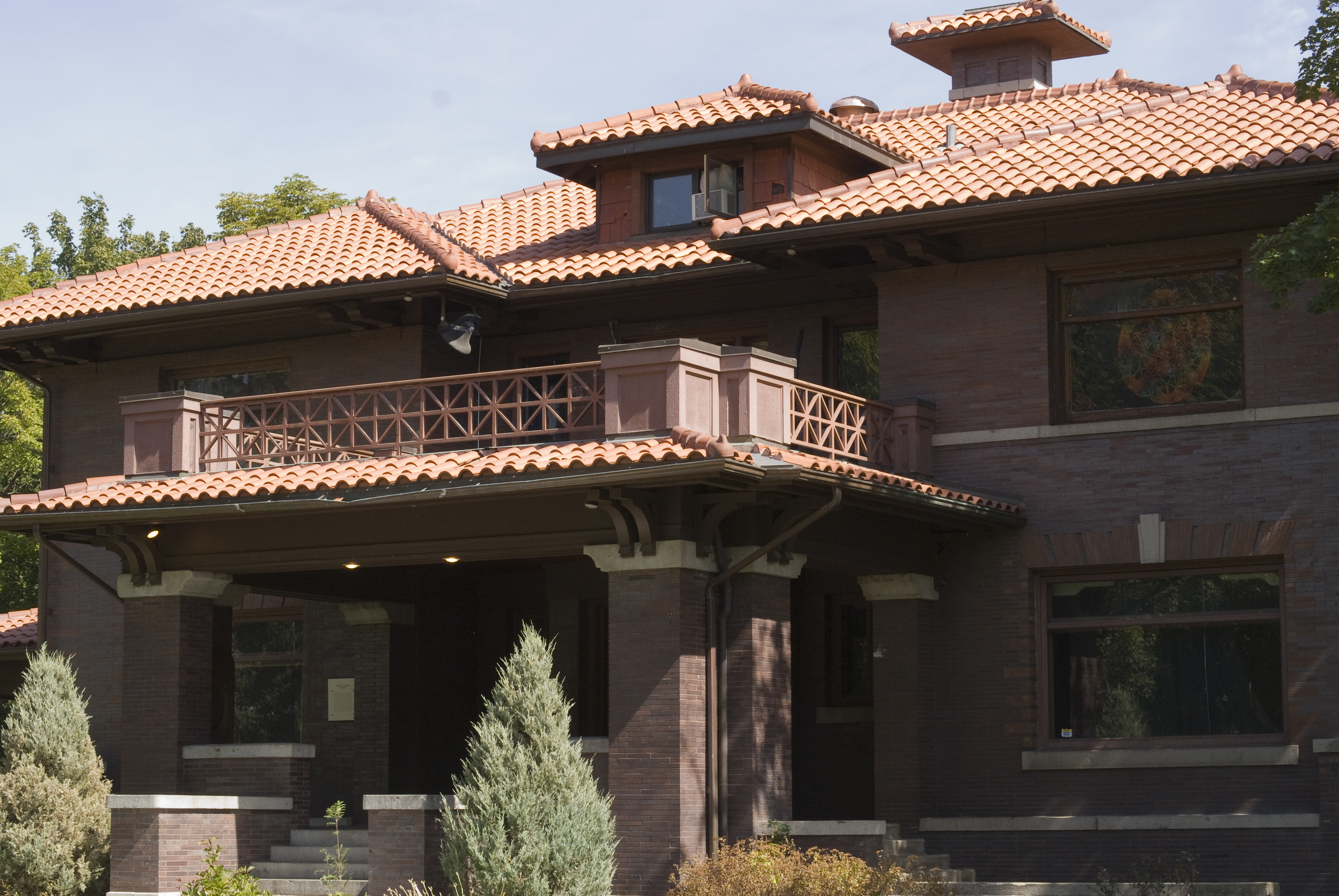
John M. Keith House in Missoula, Montana. Built in 1910, it was listed on the National Register of Historic Places in 1983

After his third term as mayor, Keith built his grand home on the south side of Missoula. His home, the John M. Keith House is on the National Register of Historic Places listings in Missoula County, Montana. Completed in 1910,

"The Prairie School style, promoted by architect Frank Lloyd Wright of Chicago, was intended to imitate the "rolling Midwestern prairie terrain." A low-pitched hipped roof and widely overhanging eaves augment the horizontal emphasis characteristic of the style, which is further enhanced by terra cotta tiles capping hip-roofed chimneys. A granite foundation and detailing add contrast to the walls of high-fired brown-rust brick. Much of the first-floor interior retains its original opulence, strongly influenced by the Craftsman style of the period, including exquisite woodwork, elegant paneling, pocket sliding doors, and a copper-clad entry hall fireplace. This distinctive home served as a private residence until the 1930s when it was purchased by the Sigma Chi fraternity."

— National Register of Historic Places
