= Dwight Harding =

American mayor (1834–1904)

5th Mayor of Missoula
- In office May 3, 1887 – May 6, 1888
- Preceded by: John Peter Smith
- Succeeded by: David D. Bogart

Personal details
- Born: 1834 Tunkhannock, Pennsylvania
- Died: July 3, 1904 (age 70) Missoula, Montana
- Party: Republican
- Spouse: Mrs. Woodward
- Occupation: Butcher, miner, mayor

Dwight Harding (1834 – July 3, 1904) was a butcher, miner and the 5th mayor of Missoula, Montana. He was born in Tunkhancock, Pennsylvania in 1834 and left home for the first time in 1856 when he moved to Minnesota. He headed west into British North America two years later and after five years there returned to the United States in 1863 after being employed by American surveyors to help establish the US–Canada border. Harding joined the gold rush in Montana's Alder Gulch and spent the next several years in various gold camps in western Montana before finally settling in Missoula in 1866. Harding brought "Harding and Company" to Missoula to engage in the butchering business. He returned to mining for two years, bought and sold a ranch, and finally returned to butchering in Missoula where he became the principal member of two establishments.

In 1874, Harding ran for Sheriff of Missoula County as a Republican but was defeated by John Miller when Democrats won all the seats that year except those of Daniel Woodman and Missoula co-founder Frank Worden who ran as Republicans. He lost again two years later running on the People's Party ticket when the Democratic Party had again swept the election. He was elected mayor on May 3, 1887, and would remain in the position for one year. He died July 3, 1904, and is buried in Missoula Cemetery.
