= Thomas C. Marshall =

American politician

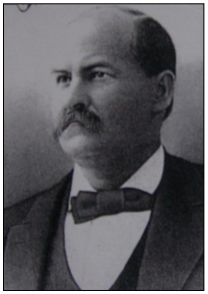

3rd Mayor of Missoula
- In office April 13, 1885 – August 6, 1885
- Preceded by: Henry C. Myers
- Succeeded by: John Peter Smith

Personal details
- Born: December 14, 1851 Paducah, Kentucky
- Died: April 23, 1911 (aged 59) Fargo, North Dakota
- Party: Democratic
- Other political affiliations: Republican (1892)
- Spouse: Millie T. Jenkins
- Education: University of Kentucky
- Profession: Pioneer, Lawyer, Judge, Mayor

Thomas C. Marshall (December 14, 1851 – April 23, 1911) was a pioneer, lawyer, judge, and the 3rd Mayor of Missoula, Montana.

== Biography ==
He was born in Paducah, Kentucky, and elected county judge of Ballard County, Kentucky, when he was 28. He moved to Missoula in 1883 where he and Frank H. Woody formed the law firm "Woody and Marshall", which dissolved four years later.

During this time on April 13, 1885, he was elected the 3rd mayor of Missoula, but he would resign four months later on August 6. He would be elected as a Democrat the following year to the Montana Territorial Legislature for two years and for a time was the Chairman of the Judiciary Committee. In 1892, Marshall switched from Democrat to Republican and ran on the Republican ticket for Congress in 1898 to replace retiring Charles S. Hartman but was defeated handily by Albert J. Campbell when Marshall split the vote with Silver Republican Thomas S. Hogan.

After the dissolution of Woody and Marshall, Marshall became the lawyer of Andrew B. Hammond-controlled properties such as the Missoula Mercantile Company, First National Bank of Missoula, and the Big Blackfoot Milling Company. He would later serve as director of the bank and Vice-President of Hammond's South Missoula Land Company.

He died April 23, 1911, in Fargo, North Dakota, en route to seeing a medical specialist.
