= USAT Arcata =

Ship built in Portland, Oregon, United States

- SS Glymont

History

United States
- Name: Glymont (1919—1937); Arcata (1937–1942)
- Owner: United States Shipping Board (1919—1923); Cook C. W. (1923–1925); Nelson Charles Co. (1925—1937); Hammond Shipping Company (1937–1942)
- Builder: Albina Engine & Machine Works, Portland, Oregon
- Cost: $821,751.56
- Launched: 23 April 1919
- Completed: 1919
- Acquired: Chartered by the US Army as USAT Arcata
- Identification: U.S. Official Number: 217972
- Fate: Sank in 1942 off Alaska

General characteristics
- Type: Design 1049 "Albinia Type" cargo ship
- Tonnage: 2,254 GRT, 1,353 NRT, 3,700 DWT
- Displacement: 5,070 tons
- Length: 300 ft (91.4 m) length overall; 289 ft (88.1 m) in registry
- Beam: 44.1 ft (13.4 m)
- Draft: 17 ft 11 in (5.5 m)
- Depth: 19.2 ft (5.9 m)
- Propulsion: Triple expansion steam, single propeller
- Speed: 12 knots (22 km/h; 14 mph)
- Boats & landing craft carried: 2

SS Arcata's sister ship, SS Point Bonita in 1918

USAT Arcata, was built in 1919 as SS Glymont for the United States Shipping Board as a merchant ship by the Albina Engine & Machine Works in Portland, Oregon. The 2,722-ton cargo ship Glymont was operated by the Matson Navigation until 1923 in post World War I work. In 1923 she was sold to Cook C. W. of San Francisco. In 1925 she was sold to Nelson Charles Company of San Francisco. In 1937 the ship was sold to the Hammond Lumber Company of Fairhaven, California and renamed Arcata. For World War II, in 1941, she was converted to the United States Army troopship USAT Arcata. She took supplies and troops to Guam. On July 14, 1942, she was attacked by the Japanese submarine I-7 and sank. Arcata was operating as a coastal resupply in the Gulf of Alaska, south of the Aleutian Islands at (53°41′N 157°45′W), approximately 165 nautical miles (306 km; 190 mi) southeast of Sand Point, when she sank. She was returning after taking supplies to US troops fighting in the Aleutian Islands campaign.

== Construction ==
Glymont was built in 1919 by Albina Engine & Machine Works, Portland, Oregon. The designation Emergency Fleet Corporation (EFC) Design 1049 "Albinia Type" ship was applied to an existing Albina design after the United States Shipping Board (USSB) requisitioned the ships. The hull was Albina's yard number 14, USSB/EFC hull number 1691.

The type was 2,254 GRT, 1,353 NRT, 3,700 DWT, 289 ft (88.1 m) in registry length, 44.1 ft (13.4 m) beam and 19.2 ft (5.9 m) draft. The ship was oil fired with triple expansion steam engines.

== Career ==
The ship was delivered in May 1919 to the United States Shipping Board. From 1920 to 1930 as Glymont, the vessel traveled to ports in China, Hawaii, San Pedro, Seattle, Vancouver, Hong Kong, Ichang, Chungking, Tientsin, Manila, Kobe, and Singapore. In 1921 she was sold to the Robert Dollar Company and used on the same routes.

=== Sinking ===
On July 14, 1942, USAT Arcata was attacked with the deck gun and machine guns of the Japanese submarine I-7. Arcata was not carrying any troops when attacked. She had a crew of 29 and four passengers. The four passengers were three United States Navy personnel and one civilian. When attacked she was traveling from Bethel, Alaska to Seattle, Washington. One of the submarine's deck gun shells hit the bridge and killed one sailor. The captain gave the abandon ship order, the ship was unarmed. The crew and passengers loaded into lifeboats. The submarine machine gunned the lifeboats, injuring more crew. The lifeboat drifted in the Bering Sea. Some of the crew died of exposure and hypothermia. USS Kane found one of the lifeboats and rescued eleven survivors. The Alaskan fishing boat Yukon found and picked up the other lifeboat with fourteen survivors. Eight sailors died, two crew killed from the attack, six from exposure and four passengers survived.
