= William Kennedy (Montana politician) =

American politician (1835–1904)

William J. Kennedy

8th Mayor of Missoula
- In office May 5, 1890 – May 3, 1891
- Preceded by: John L. Sloane
- Succeeded by: John M. Keith

Personal details
- Born: August 18, 1835 Ohio
- Died: January 18, 1904 (age 68) Missoula, Montana
- Party: Republican
- Spouse: Liz Sweeney
- Occupation: Miner, Restaurant and Hotel Proprietor, politician

William J. Kennedy (August 18, 1835 – January 18, 1904) was an American politician, miner, and restaurant and hotel proprietor who served as the eighth mayor of Missoula, Montana, from 1890 to 1891.

== Early life ==
Kennedy was on August 18, 1835, in Ohio to James and Catherine Kennedy. He was raised on a farm and worked in Ohio hotels until 1855 when he enlisted in the 10th U.S. Infantry for five years. He spent the next five years prospecting in northern California, Idaho, and the Canadian Northwest Territories (in the area that is now Alberta) before taking up ranching in Helena, Montana.

Kennedy and his family remained on the Prickly Pear ranch until 1869, during which time he and his family survived being surprised and captured by sixteen Indians near the top of the Dearborn River. Supposedly, the Indians held a vote on whether the group should be massacred or not. When the vote ended in a tie, the Indians asked the "half-breed" accompanying Kennedy to break the tie. Naturally, he voted to spare the group and the family was spared. After sending his family back east and following the gold rush for a couple more years, Kennedy eventually settled in Missoula, Montana.

== Hotel and restaurant proprietor ==
After reuniting with his family, Kennedy moved to Missoula where he engaged hotel and restaurant business in addition to maintaining a ranch outside the city. In 1871, he opened the "Kennedy House" on Main Street. It was put up for sale in 1877, and in 1881 he sold this property to Capt. W.H. Rodgers of Virginia City, Montana, who would rename it the "Rodgers Hotel". Kennedy himself planned to retire to a ranch. However, in November that same year, Kennedy purchased a lot from Christopher P. Higgins to build a two-story and basement building for a restaurant and public hall. "The Missoula Restaurant" opened the next year as the first restaurant on Main Street. It was managed by Kennedy and Hentz. In October 1884, Kennedy took charge of the Windsor Hotel on Front Street. The next year, he took control of the Missoula Skating Rink.

In May 1890, in partnership with Samuel Mitchell, the foundation walls for the New Kennedy Hotel (Missoula Hotel) were laid and the three-story Tudor-style was completed early 1891. The hotel soon began to have financial problems.

== Mayor ==
Kennedy was elected as the 8th mayor May 5, 1890 and served for 12 months.
