= John L. Sloane =

American politician

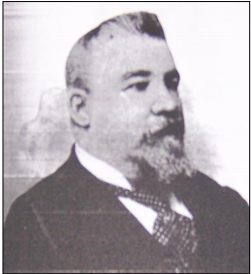

7th Mayor of Missoula
- In office May 16, 1889 – May 4, 1890
- Preceded by: David D. Bogart
- Succeeded by: William Kennedy

Personal details
- Born: March 28, 1847 New York City
- Died: September 5, 1914 (aged 67) Seattle, Washington
- Spouse: Lizzie Mansfield
- Profession: Express Agent, Clerk of District Court, Chief Clerk of the U.S. Land Office, Deputy Clerk Assessor, Mayor, Lawyer

John L. Sloane (March 28, 1847 – September 5, 1914) was an express agent, clerk of district court, chief clerk of the U.S. Land Office, deputy clerk assessor, lawyer, and the 7th mayor of Missoula, Montana. He was born in New York City, New York, and in 1864 he enlisted in the Fifth New York Veteran Volunteers, Duryea Zouaves, and served in the Civil War until its completion. He would later serve as a second lieutenant in the Second California Volunteer Cavalry before moving to Fort Missoula soon after the fort was opened in 1877. He left the army in 1881 and in 1883 was elected the first police magistrate of Missoula, Montana. He served in this capacity until May 6, 1889, when he was elected both clerk of the district court and the seventh mayor of Missoula. After holding multiple elected positions, he retired from active work in 1901. He died at his daughter's home in Seattle, Washington, in 1914, and was buried in Missoula Cemetery.
