= John M. Evans (Montana politician) =

American politician

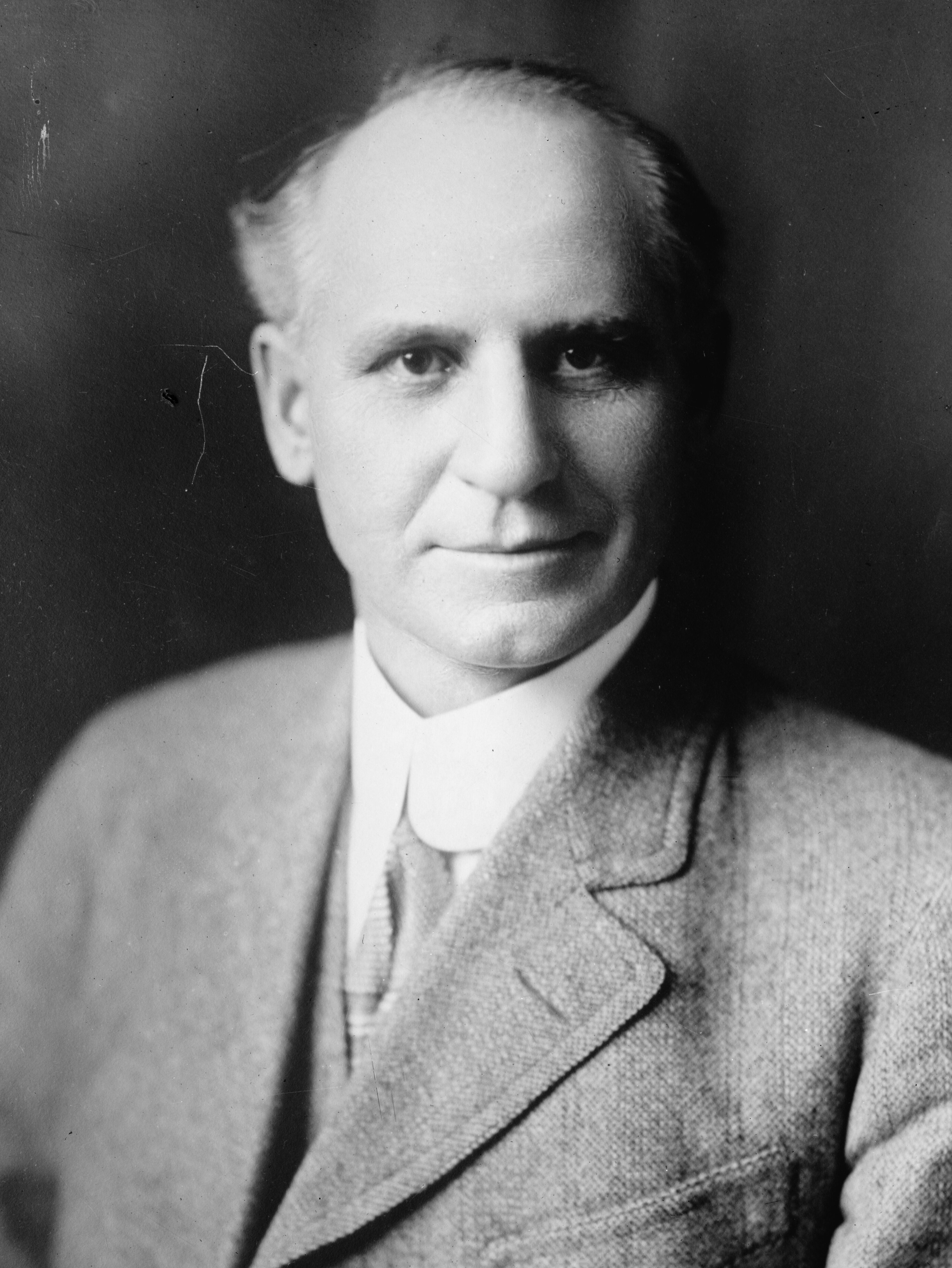

Member of the U.S. House of Representatives from Montana
- In office March 4, 1923 – March 3, 1933
- Preceded by: Washington J. McCormick
- Succeeded by: Joseph P. Monaghan
- Constituency: 1st district
- In office March 4, 1913 – March 3, 1921
- Preceded by: Charles Nelson Pray
- Succeeded by: Washington J. McCormick
- Constituency: At-large district (1913–1919); 1st district (1919–1921)

21st Mayor of Missoula
- In office July 16, 1911 – May 6, 1912
- Preceded by: William Henry Reid
- Succeeded by: James M. Rhoades

Personal details
- Born: John Morgan Evans; January 7, 1863 Sedalia, Missouri, U.S.
- Died: March 12, 1946 (aged 83) Washington, D.C., U.S.
- Resting place: Missoula Cemetery
- Party: Democratic
- Education: United States Military Academy; University of Missouri

John Morgan Evans (January 7, 1863 – March 12, 1946) was an American Democratic politician.

== Biography ==
He was born in Sedalia, Missouri. Evans went to the United States Military Academy and then graduated from University of Missouri. He studied law and practiced law in Missoula, Montana. Evans was judge of the police court, register of the United States Land Office, and served as Mayor of Missoula, Montana. He was elected as a Democrat to the United States House of Representatives from Montana and served from March 4, 1913, to March 4, 1921. He was defeated in his bid for re-election in 1920, but regained his seat in the 1922 election and served from March 4, 1923, to March 4, 1933. He died in Washington, D.C.

U.S. House of Representatives
Preceded by Charles N. Pray	Member of the U.S. House of Representatives from Montana's at-large congressional district 1913–1919	Succeeded by District eliminated
Preceded by District created	Member of the U.S. House of Representatives from Montana's 1st congressional district 1919–1921	Succeeded by Washington J. McCormick
Preceded by Washington J. McCormick	Member of the U.S. House of Representatives from Montana's 1st congressional district 1923–1933	Succeeded by Joseph P. Monaghan
