= Frank H. Woody =

American judge

Judge Frank Hargrave Woody
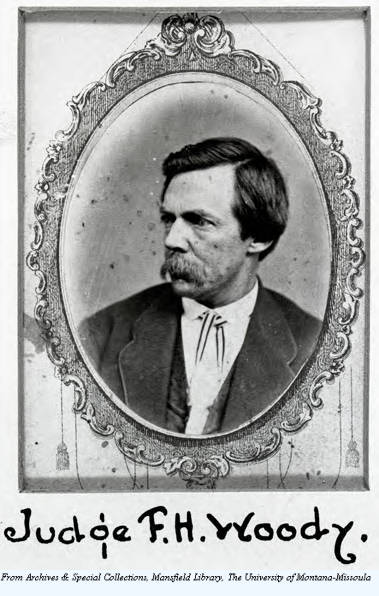

1st Mayor of Missoula
- In office April 19, 1883 – May 22, 1884
- Succeeded by: Henry C. Myers

Personal details
- Born: December 10, 1833 Chatham County, North Carolina
- Died: December 16, 1916 (aged 83) Missoula, Montana
- Party: Democrat
- Spouse: Lizzie Countryman
- Children: One son and three daughters
- Profession: Store clerk, Freighter, Miner, Editor, Probate Judge, Auditor, Attorney, Postmaster, County Clerk and Recorder, Deputy Clerk of District Court, Historian, Politician

Frank Hargrave Woody (December 10, 1833 – December 16, 1916) was, among many occupations, the first mayor of Missoula, Montana. He was born in Chatham County, North Carolina and attended New Garden Boarding School in Greensboro, North Carolina. After teaching for several years he began moving westward in 1852 before eventually settling in what was then called Flathead county (today's Ravalli and Missoula Counties) in Washington Territory where he was paid to drive supplies for trade with the native populations. Woody accompanied Christopher P. Higgins and Frank Worden in the establishment of Hellgate Village and later Missoula, Montana.

In 1866 Woody was appointed to serve as Clerk and Recorder of Missoula County and also acted as Probate Judge as well as post master and finally Deputy Clerk of the Second Judicial District Court of Missoula. He became Missoula's first attorney in 1877 after passing the Montana Bar and on April 19, 1883 he became Missoula's first mayor. He would serve in this capacity until May 22, 1884.

Woody was elected to the office of District Judge after receiving the Democratic Nomination in 1892. He would be re-elected in 1896.

Woody was also the chairman of the University Committee in charge of lobbying the Montana State Legislature for allowing Missoula to be the location of the University of Montana. It is said that a considerable amount of money was spent on whiskey and three different types of cigars by the 25 lobbyists in their efforts.
