= SS A. B. Hammond =

WWII Liberty Ship

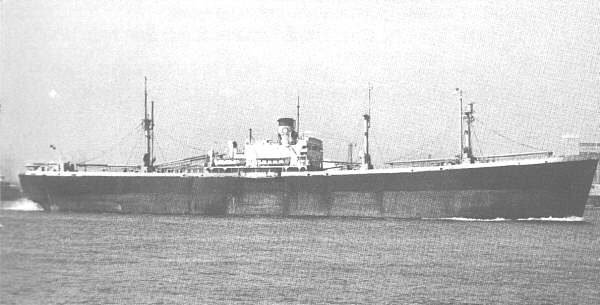
- SS A. B. Hammond

History

United States
- Name: A. B. Hammond
- Namesake: Andrew B. Hammond
- Owner: War Shipping Administration (WSA)
- Operator: Hammond Shipping Co. Ltd.
- Ordered: as type (EC2-S-C1) hull, MCE hull 2558
- Awarded: 20 April 1943
- Builder: California Shipbuilding Corporation, Terminal Island, Los Angeles
- Cost: $950,330
- Yard number: 289
- Way number: 12
- Laid down: 23 December 1943
- Launched: 21 January 1944
- Completed: 8 February 1944
- Fate: Scrapped, 1963

General characteristics
- Class & type: Liberty ship; type EC2-S-C1, standard
- Tonnage: 10,865 LT DWT; 7,176 GRT
- Displacement: 3,380 long tons (3,434 t) (light); 14,245 long tons (14,474 t) (max)
- Length: 441 feet 6 inches (135 m) oa; 416 feet (127 m) pp; 427 feet (130 m) lwl
- Beam: 57 feet (17 m)
- Draft: 27 ft 9.25 in (8.4646 m)
- Installed power: 2 × Oil fired 450 °F (232 °C) boilers, operating at 220 psi (1,500 kPa); 2,500 hp (1,900 kW)
- Propulsion: 1 × triple-expansion steam engine, (manufactured by Joshua Hendy Iron Works, Sunnyvale, California); 1 × screw propeller
- Speed: 11.5 knots (21.3 km/h; 13.2 mph)
- Capacity: 562,608 cubic feet (15,931 m^{3}) (grain); 499,573 cubic feet (14,146 m^{3}) (bale)
- Complement: 38–62 USMM; 21–40 USNAG
- Armament: Varied by ship; Bow-mounted 3-inch (76 mm)/50-caliber gun; Stern-mounted 4-inch (102 mm)/50-caliber gun; 2–8 × single 20-millimeter (0.79 in) Oerlikon anti-aircraft (AA) cannons and/or, 2–8 × 37-millimeter (1.46 in) M1 AA guns

SS A. B. Hammond was a liberty ship built by California Shipbuilding Corporation of Los Angeles, and delivered in February 1944, to the War Shipping Administration (WSA).

SS A. B. Hammond is named after Andrew B. Hammond, owner of the Hammond Lumber Company and Hammond Shipping Co. Ltd. During World War II Hammond Shipping Company was active in charter shipping with the Maritime Commission and War Shipping Administration. The ship was run by its Hammond Shipping Company crew and the US Navy supplied United States Navy Armed Guards to man the deck guns and radio. Hammond Shipping Co. Ltd. operated both Liberty and Victory ships.

In 1947 the War Shipping Administration sold the ship for private use. She was scrapped in 1963, following grounding damage.

== Names and flags ==
- 1947 – Renamed "MARIO II" by Constantine Koniadlidis of Montevideo – Uruguay flag
- 1948 – Renamed "ENSENADA" by Cia de Nav, of Ensenada, Panama (S. G. Embiricos, London)
- 1959 – Renamed "CESTOS" Zenith Transportation Corporation, of Liberia Flag, (Fratelli Delfino, Genoa)
- 1961 – Renamed "NICOLAOS TSAVLIRIS" Nigean Shipping Company, of Panama – Greek flag (Tsavliris Maritime Company, Piraeus)
- 1963 – Scrapped – Turkey after grounding damage at Kilyos, Black Sea.
