= List of cemeteries in Montana =

This list of cemeteries in Montana includes currently operating, historical (closed for new interments), and defunct (graves abandoned or removed) cemeteries, columbaria, and mausolea which are historical and/or notable. It does not include pet cemeteries.

== Big Horn County ==
- Custer National Cemetery at Little Bighorn Battlefield National Monument, near Crow Agency

== Carbon County ==
- Gebo Cemetery, Fromberg; NRHP-listed

== Flathead County ==
- C. E. Conrad Memorial Cemetery, Kalispell; NRHP-listed

== Lewis and Clark County ==
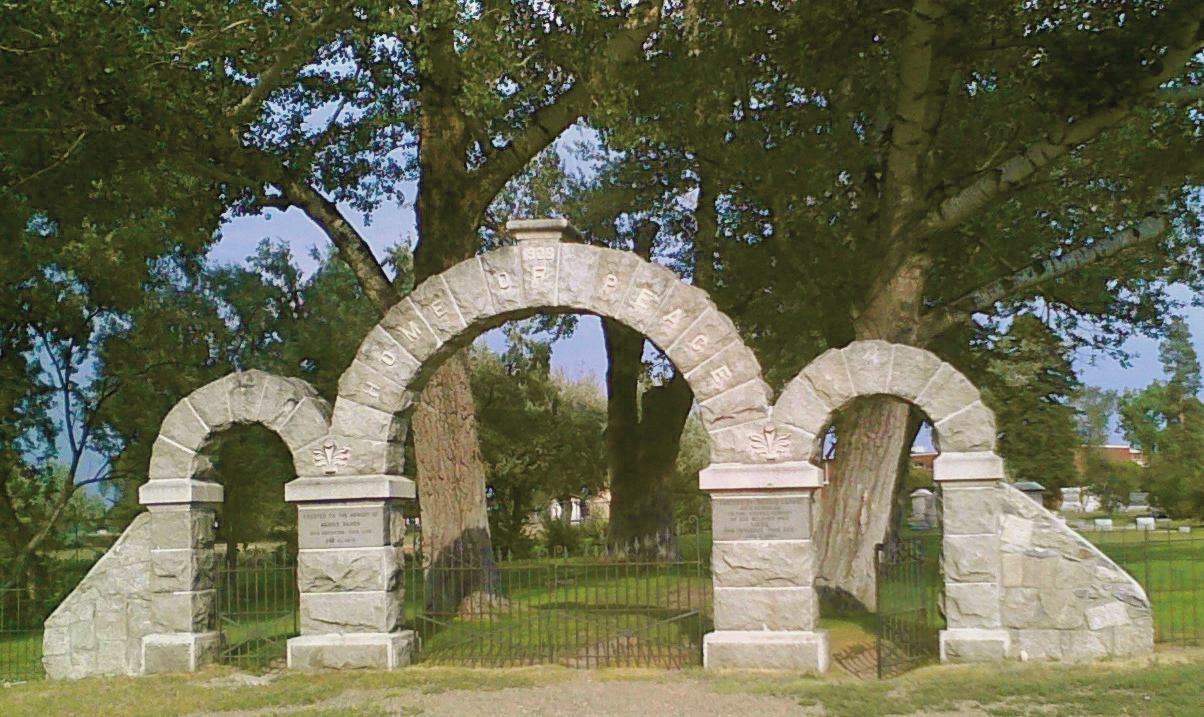
Home of Peace Cemetery in Helena, Lewis and Clark County

- Benton Avenue Cemetery, Helena; NRHP-listed
- Forestvale Cemetery, Helena; NRHP-listed
- Home of Peace Cemetery, Helena; NRHP-listed

== Missoula County ==
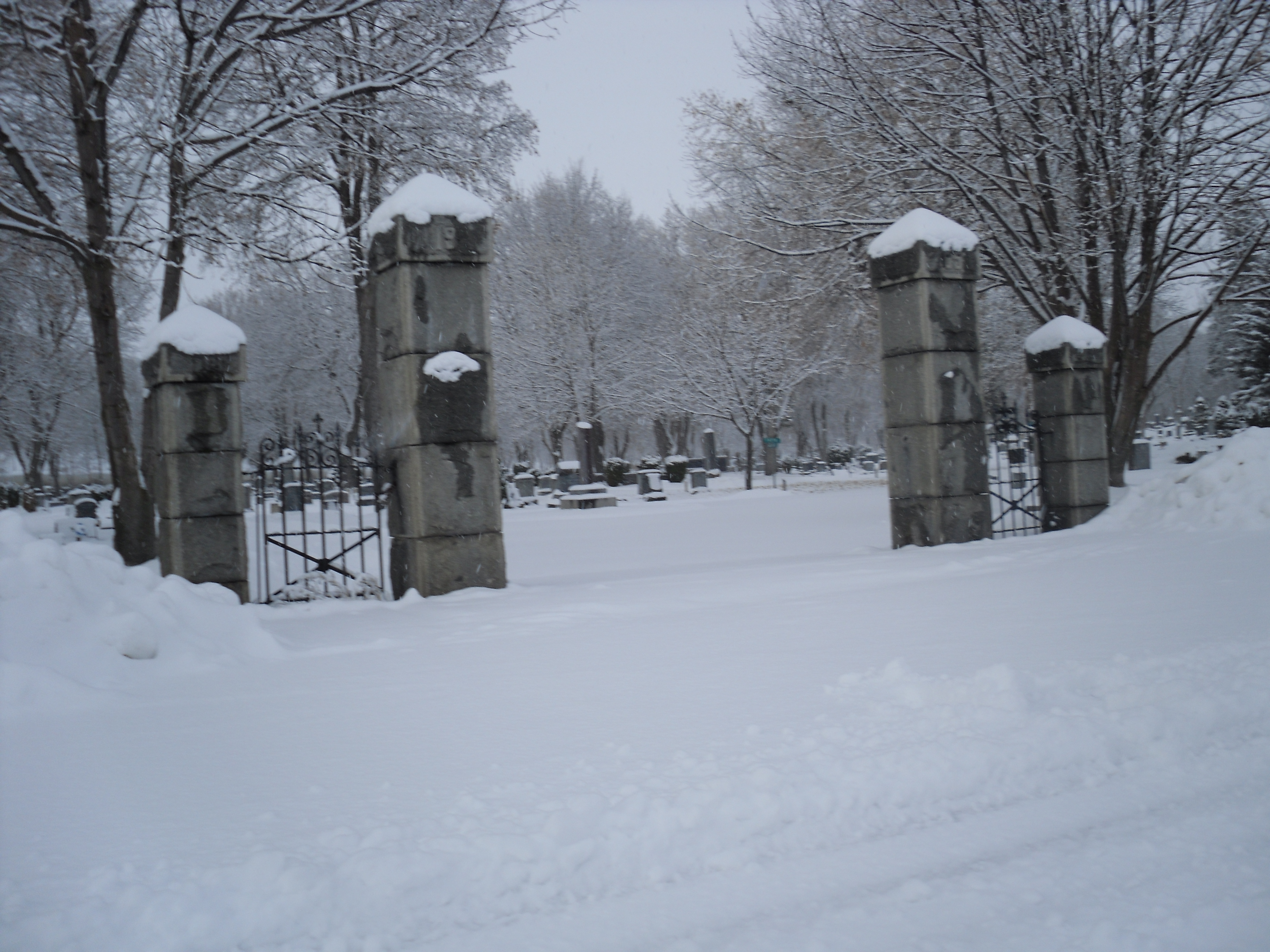
Missoula Cemetery in Missoula, Missoula County

- Missoula Cemetery, Missoula

== Yellowstone County ==
- Billings Cemetery, Billings
- Boothill Cemetery, Billings; NRHP-listed
- Mountview Cemetery, Billings

== See also ==
- List of cemeteries in the United States
- National Register of Historic Places listings in Montana
- Pioneer cemetery
