= John Engen =

American politician (1964–2022)

50th Mayor of Missoula
- In office January 3, 2006 – August 15, 2022
- Preceded by: Mike Kadas
- Succeeded by: Gwen Jones (acting), Jordan Hess

Personal details
- Born: October 27, 1964; Missoula, Montana, U.S.
- Died: August 15, 2022 (aged 57)
- Political party: Democratic
- Education: University of Montana (BA)
- Profession: Journalist, politician

John Scott Engen (October 27, 1964 – August 15, 2022) was an American politician and journalist who served as mayor of Missoula, Montana, from 2006 until his death in 2022.

== Early life and education ==
Engen was born in Missoula in October 27, 1964. He attended public schools in Missoula before earning a Bachelor of Arts degree in journalism from the University of Montana.

== Career ==
Before serving as mayor, Engen served on the Missoula City Council, worked as a journalist and newspaper editor, and operated a small business.

In 2013, Engen and the City of Missoula initiated a legal process to use eminent domain to require the city's privately held water utility be sold to the city. In June 2015, after a 10-day trial, the Fourth Judicial District Court found that the City of Missoula had the right to use eminent domain to acquire Mountain Water Co. The decision was appealed to the Montana Supreme Court, which issued an opinion upholding the district court order on August 2, 2016.

During the 2008 presidential election campaign, Engen endorsed Barack Obama.

In 2015, Engen was criticized after the city council approved adding morbid obesity surgeries to city health insurance coverage. At the time Engen refused all comment to local media on his involvement or benefit from the change. Later that year, Engen again refused to speak to the press but released a letter to the community stating he had undergone bariatric surgery on October 19 and was recuperating at home. He confirmed his insurance had paid all but $3,200 of the surgery costs, but refuted critics by saying his surgery would "not add to anyone's tax bill."

In October 2016, Engen took a month off work to enter a rehabilitation program for alcohol addiction.

== Personal life ==
Engen died on August 15, 2022, at the age of 57 from pancreatic cancer. Engen left behind his long time partner Lucy Guthrie Beighle and her two children Allison and Calvin Beighle
