= Mike Kadas =

American politician (1964–2022)

Montana Director of the Department of Revenue
- In office January 7, 2013 – May 11, 2018
- Preceded by: Dan Bucks
- Succeeded by: Gene Walborn

49th Mayor of Missoula
- In office September 3, 1996 – January 2, 2006
- Preceded by: Daniel Kemmis
- Succeeded by: John Engen

Member of the Montana House of Representatives from the 95th district
- In office January 3, 1983 – January 3, 1985
- Preceded by: Ann Mary Dussault
- Succeeded by: Les Fitselman

Member of the Montana House of Representatives from the 55th district
- In office January 3, 1985 – January 2, 1995
- Preceded by: Marjorie Hart
- Succeeded by: Edward J. Grady

Member of the Montana House of Representatives from the 66th district
- In office January 2, 1995 – September 3, 1996
- Preceded by: Bea McCarthy
- Succeeded by: Diane Sands

Personal details
- Born: November 20, 1956 Roseburg, Oregon, U.S.
- Party: Democratic (before 1996, 2013-2018); Nonpartisan (1996-2006)
- Education: University of Montana (BA), (MA)
- Profession: Business owner, former politician

Mike Kadas is an American politician. He served as Director of the Montana Department of Revenue from 2013 to 2018 under Governor Steve Bullock. Prior to this, Kadas served as Mayor of Missoula from 1996 to 2006 and represented Missoula in the Montana House of Representatives from 1983 to 1996.

== Early life and education ==
Kadas was born in Roseburg, Oregon in 1956. He moved to Missoula in 1979 where he was employed as a carpenter from 1983 to 1986. He was also the owner of a small construction company from 1989 to 1996. He received a Bachelor's degree in economics-philosophy in 1992 and a Master's degree in economics in 1996, both from the University of Montana. Kadas worked as the director of special projects for Rivertop Renewables from 2008 to 2012. He and his partner Martha Newell have two sons.

== Political career ==
Kadas was first elected into the Montana House of Representatives' 95th district (Missoula) in the 1982 elections as a Democrat. After redistricting, he was re-elected five times between 1984 and 1992 as the representative for the 55th district and then once again in 1994 for the 66th district following another redistricting. He won the 1996 Democratic primary for the 66th district but withdrew from the race after being appointed mayor of Missoula. Diane Sands was appointed Democratic nominee and won unopposed in November 1996.

On September 3, 1996, incumbent Missoula mayor Daniel Kemmis announced his resignation, prompting the Missoula City Council to appoint Kadas to the role of mayor. He won the November 4, 1997 Missoula mayoral election and served until 2006. He was credited with handling Missoula's growth with infrastructure improvements and with managing the city professionally. John Engen was elected in November 2005 to succeed Kadas.

Kadas was announced as the Director of the Montana Department of Revenue by Governor Steve Bullock in December 2012. In April 2018, he announced he would be retiring after over five years in the position. His resignation came as the agency was closing half of its property assessment division offices and suspending new hires following budget cuts. He was credited with modernizing the state property tax appraisal process and negotiating the settlement of contested taxes.

== Electoral history ==
=== 1982 ===
Montana State House Democratic Primary District 95, 1982
Party	Candidate	Votes	%
Democratic	Mike Kadas	412	41.1%
Democratic	Dan (Patrick) Norman	369	36.8%
Democratic	John Lamb	144	14.4%
Democratic	Kenneth (Knute) Thompson, Jr.	78	7.8%
Total votes		1,003	100.0%

Montana State House General Election District 95, 1982
Party	Candidate	Votes	%
Democratic	Mike Kadas	2,063	60.8%
Republican	Marilyn Fernelius	1,165	34.3%
Libertarian	Bryan Spellman	164	4.8%
Total votes		3,392	100.0%

=== 1984 ===
Montana State House Democratic Primary District 55, 1984
Party	Candidate	Votes	%
Democratic	Mike Kadas	771	70.1%
Democratic	Gary Marbut	329	29.9%
Total votes		1,100	100.0%

Montana State House General Election District 55, 1984
Party	Candidate	Votes	%
Democratic	Mike Kadas	2,854	100.0%
Total votes		2,854	100.0%

=== 1986 ===
Montana State House Democratic Primary District 55, 1986
Party	Candidate	Votes	%
Democratic	Mike Kadas	644	78.9%
Democratic	Richard (Dick) Turner	172	21.1%
Total votes		816	100.0%

Montana State House General Election District 55, 1986
Party	Candidate	Votes	%
Democratic	Mike Kadas	1,613	69.7%
Republican	Martha Powell	701	30.3%
Total votes		2,314	100.0%

=== 1988 ===
Montana State House Democratic Primary District 55, 1988
Party	Candidate	Votes	%
Democratic	Mike Kadas	867	100.0%
Total votes		867	100.0%

Montana State House General Election District 55, 1988
Party	Candidate	Votes	%
Democratic	Mike Kadas	2,227	75.2%
Republican	Mavis Vaillancourt	735	24.8%
Total votes		2,962	100.0%

=== 1990 ===
Montana State House Democratic Primary District 55, 1990
Party	Candidate	Votes	%
Democratic	Mike Kadas	787	100.0%
Total votes		787	100.0%

Montana State House General Election District 55, 1990
Party	Candidate	Votes	%
Democratic	Mike Kadas	1,898	100.0%
Total votes		1,898	100.0%

=== 1992 ===
Montana State House Democratic Primary District 55, 1992
Party	Candidate	Votes	%
Democratic	Mike Kadas	1,101	100.0%
Total votes		1,101	100.0%

Montana State House General Election District 55, 1992
Party	Candidate	Votes	%
Democratic	Mike Kadas	3,267	100.0%
Total votes		3,267	100.0%

=== 1994 ===
Montana State House Democratic Primary District 66, 1994
Party	Candidate	Votes	%
Democratic	Mike Kadas	1,079	79.6%
Democratic	Robert Thornton	277	20.4%
Total votes		1,356	100.0%

Montana State House General Election District 66, 1994
Party	Candidate	Votes	%
Democratic	Mike Kadas	2,149	72.5%
Republican	Bradley Aipperspach	814	27.5%
Total votes		2,963	100.0%

=== 1996 ===
Montana State House Democratic Primary District 66, 1996
Party	Candidate	Votes	%
Democratic	Mike Kadas	815	100.0%
Total votes		815	100.0%

=== 1997 ===
City of Missoula Mayoral Primary Election, 1997
Party	Candidate	Votes	%
Nonpartisan	Mike Kadas	2,298	68.3%
Nonpartisan	Edward (Ed) Childers	1,067	31.7%
Total votes		3,365	100.0%

City of Missoula Mayoral General Election, 1997
Party	Candidate	Votes	%
Nonpartisan	Mike Kadas	6,703	60.1%
Nonpartisan	Edward (Ed) Childers	4,446	39.9%
Total votes		11,149	100.0%

=== 2001 ===
City of Missoula Mayoral Primary Election, 2001
Party	Candidate	Votes	%
Nonpartisan	Mike Kadas	2,022	51.3%
Nonpartisan	Jeffrey Jordan	973	24.7%
Nonpartisan	Kandi Matthew-Jenkins	950	24.1%
Total votes		3,945	100.0%

City of Missoula Mayoral General Election, 2001
Party	Candidate	Votes	%
Nonpartisan	Mike Kadas	5,697	57.1%
Nonpartisan	Jeffrey Jordan	3,733	37.4%
Nonpartisan	Kandi Matthew-Jenkins	548	5.5%
Total votes		9,978	100.0%
