= Charles E. Conrad Mansion =

Historic house in Montana, United States

- U.S. National Register of Historic Places
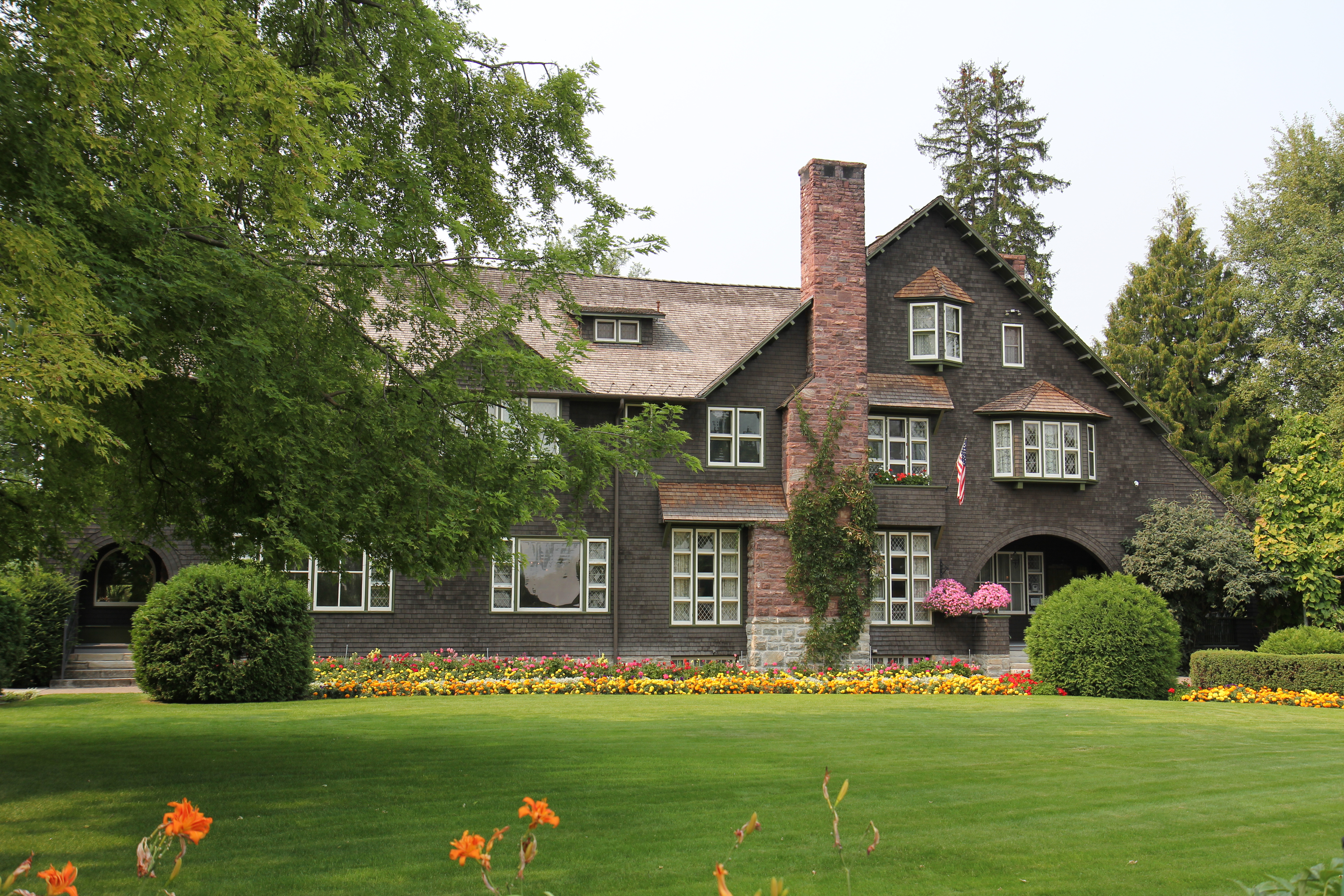

- Location within Montana Location within the United States
- Location: 313 6th Ave., E., Kalispell, Montana
- Coordinates: 48°11′49″N 114°18′8″W
- Area: 2.7 acres (1.1 ha)
- Built: 1895
- Architect: Kirtland K. Cutter
- Architectural style: Norman
- NRHP reference No.: 75001083
- Added to NRHP: February 20, 1975

The Charles E. Conrad Mansion is a historical Victorian era shingle-style Norman mansion located in Kalispell, Montana. It was designed by the noted Spokane, Washington, architect Kirtland Cutter. It was the home of Charles E. Conrad, a late 19th century shipping magnate and early pioneer of Kalispell.

== Style and construction ==
The style of the architecture is a revivalist version of the vernacular farmhouse style of the architecture of Normandy in France, rather than the version of Romanesque architecture called "Norman architecture". Construction of the home began in 1892 and it was completed in November 1895.

== National Register of Historic Places ==
The mansion is listed on the National Register of Historic Places listings in Flathead County, Montana.

== See also ==
- C. E. Conrad Memorial Cemetery, also listed on the National Register
