= Diane Sands =

American politician from Montana

Member of the Montana Senate from the 49th district
- Incumbent
- Assumed office January 5, 2015
- Preceded by: David Wanzenried

Member of the Montana House of Representatives
- In office January 1, 2007 – January 7, 2013
- Preceded by: Tom Facey
- Succeeded by: Tom Steenberg
- Constituency: 95th District
- In office January 6, 1997 – January 4, 1999
- Preceded by: Mike Kadas
- Succeeded by: Gail Gutsche
- Constituency: 66th District

Personal details
- Born: March 23, 1947 (age 79) St. Ignatius, Montana
- Party: Democratic
- Spouse: Ann Mary Dussault

Haysel Diane Sands (born March 23, 1947) is an American politician from Montana. As a Democrat, she served in the Montana State Senate, representing the 49th senate district in Missoula, Montana. Previously, she served in the Montana House of Representatives representing first the 66th district and then the renumbered 95th district.

== Biography ==
Born in St. Ignatius, Montana, Sands obtained a B.A. in Anthropology from the University of Montana before doing graduate work at George Washington University in Washington, D.C.

Sands began her career in the Montana State Legislature in 1996, when she was appointed as the Democratic nominee for the Montana House of Representatives in the 66th district. The previous nominee, incumbent Rep. Mike Kadas, had just been appointed Mayor of Missoula following the resignation of Daniel Kemmis. She was elected, without opposition, in November 1996 and took office in January 1997. She did not run for re-election in 1998 when her employment required her to move to Oregon. She returned to Montana in December 1999.

In 2006, when Tom Facey was termed out after eight years in the House, Sands ran to succeed him in the renumbered 95th district. She faced no primary opposition and defeated her Republican opponent by 60% to 40%. She was re-elected in 2008, 2010, 2012, and 2014.

Sands was elected to the Montana Senate in 2014, succeeding the term-limited David Wanzenried. In the 2014 general election, she prevailed over the Republican candidate, former state representative Dick Haines, by just 33 votes (50.2% to 49.8%). She ran for re-election in 2018, and defeated Republican candidate Chase Reynolds by 343 votes (51.6% to 48.4%). Her term ends in January 2023, at which point she will be term limited from the senate, although able to run for the house.

A lesbian, she was the first ever openly gay member of the Montana Legislature. She served alongside several other LGBT legislators, including Sen. Christine Kaufmann and Bryce Bennett (D–Missoula). Her 1996 campaign won the support of the Gay & Lesbian Victory Fund.

Her partner, Ann Mary Dussault, is a former Missoula County commissioner and Montana legislator. Having first assumed legislative office in 1975, she served four terms and was the first female majority leader in the nation.
