= Billings Cemetery =

Cemetery in Yellowstone County, Montana, US

Coordinates: 45°46′06″N 108°33′27″W

- Interactive map of Billings Cemetery

Details
- Established: 1882
- Location: Billings, Montana

Billings Cemetery was established in Billings, Montana, United States, in 1882 by the O'Donnell family and operated by them until the city purchased it in 1926. The Cemetery merged with Mountview Cemetery in 1926.

== See also ==
- List of cemeteries in the United States
- List of cemeteries in Montana
