= John Peter Smith (Montana politician) =

American politician (born 1848)

4th Mayor of Missoula
- In office August 6, 1885 – May 2, 1887
- Preceded by: Thomas C. Marshall
- Succeeded by: Dwight Harding

Personal details
- Born: October 1848 Pennsylvania
- Died: Unknown
- Other political affiliations: Democratic
- Spouse(s): Sophia Alice Hammer (1874- ?), Ida Mary Reinicke (1887 - 1892)
- Children: Ida Lisetta (Smith) Cory
- Profession: Mayor, Sawmill worker

John Peter Smith (born October 1848) was born in Pennsylvania to immigrant parents with his father from Germany and his mother from France. He moved to Fort Madison, Iowa where he lived with Barbara Green, a widow also from Pennsylvania with French immigrant parents.

In Iowa, Smith worked in a sawmill and married his first wife, Sophia Alice Hammer. After their daughter Ida Lisetta Smith was born in 1876, the family moved to Frenchtown, Montana in Missoula County.

Smith was serving as an alderman in the newly incorporated city of Missoula in 1885 when he was appointed mayor pro tem on August 6 after Mayor Thomas C. Marshall resigned. He was elected mayor in a special election on August 23 and served until May 2, 1887.

Near the end of his term, Smith married Ida Mary Reinicke, the daughter of a prominent stockgrower and owner of the popular Reinicke House, which served as accommodation in Sun river Leavings, Montana.

After serving as mayor, Smith once again divorced and in 1900 was living as an unemployed barber in the Albert R Zoske household. He later moved to Spokane, Washington to live with his daughter Ida and her husband Samuel W. Cory.
