= SS Bessemer Victory =

Victory ship of the United States

History

United States
- Name: SS Bessemer Victory
- Builder: California Shipbuilding Corporation, Terminal Island, Los Angeles
- Laid down: 28 May 1945
- Launched: 26 July 1945
- Reclassified: USNS Bessemer (T-AG-186), 1 February 1966
- Identification: IMO number: 5043162
- Fate: Scrapped, 1991

General characteristics
- Type: Victory ship
- Displacement: 4,512 long tons (4,584 t) light; 15,589 long tons (15,839 t) full
- Length: 455 ft (139 m)
- Beam: 62 ft (19 m)
- Draft: 29 ft (8.8 m)
- Propulsion: Cross-compound steam turbine, single screw, 6,000 hp (4,474 kW)
- Speed: 15.5 knots (28.7 km/h; 17.8 mph)
- Armament: 1 × 5 in (130 mm) gun (stern); 1 × 3 in (76 mm) gun (bow); 8 × 20 mm machine guns

SS Bessemer Victory was one of 534 Victory ships built during World War II. Named for Bessemer, Alabama, an industrial city honoring Sir Henry Bessemer (the Englishman who invented a steel manufacturing process), she was one of 218 such ships that were named after American cities.

Bessemer Victory was laid down on 28 May 1945 at Los Angeles by the California Shipbuilding Corporation as a Maritime Commission type (VC2-S-AP2) hull under Maritime Commission contract (MCV hull 806). Launched 26 July 1945, she was delivered to the Maritime Commission 30 August 1945.

During War II she was operated by Hammond Shipping Company as charter shipping with the United States Maritime Commission and War Shipping Administration. The ship was run by its Hammond Shipping Company crew and the United States Navy supplied United States Navy Armed Guards to man the deck guns and radio.

In the Korean War she was part of the Echelon Movement Group X Corps Troops.

One of 12 Victory ships selected for transfer from the National Defense Reserve Fleet to the Military Sea Transportation Service (MSTS) for cargo-carrying service during the Vietnam War, she was assigned the name USNS Bessemer and the designation T-AG-186 on 1 February 1966 (though the ship never served with MSTS because the program was cancelled; however, she did carry cargo to Vietnam as Bessemer Victory under a commercial charter). Returned to the National Defense Reserve Fleet, Bessemer Victory remained in the Maritime Administration's berthing area in Virginia's James River until she was scrapped in 1991 at Alang, India.
