= List of mayors of Missoula, Montana =

Mayor of Missoula
- Incumbent; Andrea Davis since November 20, 2023
- Style: The Honorable
- Term length: 4 years
- Inaugural holder: Frank H. Woody
- Formation: April 19, 1883
- Website: http://www.ci.missoula.mt.us/index.aspx?NID=318

The list of mayors of Missoula, Montana begins with the establishment of the town of Missoula in 1883 (incorporated as a city two years later), with Judge Frank H. Woody serving as mayor. In 1883, Missoula used an aldermanic form of government that was approved with the town charter. The city adopted a commission-council form of government in 1911 with the opening of a new city hall, and a council–manager government in 1954, before returning to an aldermanic form of government in 1959. Since January 1, 1997, Missoula has been governed in accordance with the Missoula City Charter, which calls for a mayor-council system of government.

The current system comprises a mayor and city treasurer elected in a citywide vote and twelve city council members who must reside in and are elected from one of six wards with each ward having two council members. All positions are nonpartisan per state statute. Council members and the mayor are elected to four-year terms with council-member elections being staggered to allow only one member from each ward to up for re-election. There are no term limits for either position.

== List of mayors ==
#	Name	Picture	Took office	Length of term	Additional information
1	Frank H. Woody		Elected April 19, 1883	13 months	
2	Henry C. Myers		Elected May 23, 1884	11 months	
3	Thomas C. Marshall		Elected April 13, 1885	4 months	Resigned August 6, 1885
4	John Peter Smith		Appointed August 6, 1885	21 months	
5	Dwight Harding		Elected May 3, 1887	12 months	
6	David D. Bogart		Elected May 7, 1888	12 months	
7	John L. Sloane		Elected May 16, 1889	12 months	
8	William Kennedy		Elected May 5, 1890	12 months	
9	John M. Keith		Elected May 4, 1891	12 months	
10	Frank G. Higgins		Elected May 27, 1892	12 months	
11	Henry W. McLaughlin		Elected May 1, 1893	24 months	
12	John M. Keith		Elected May 6, 1895	24 months	
13	Frederick C. Webster		Elected May 3, 1897	48 months	
14	Andrew Logan		Elected late 1900	half-year	
15	Albert M. Stevens		Elected May 6, 1901	24 months	
16	M. R. C. Smith		Elected May 4, 1903	2 months	Resigned March 11, 1907
17	Fred C. Morgan		Appointed March 11, 1907	2 months	
18	John M. Keith		Elected May 6, 1907	24 months	
19	Andrew Logan		Elected May 3, 1909	24 months	
20	William Henry Reid		Elected May 1, 1911	2 months	Resigned July 7, 1911
21	John M. Evans		Appointed July 16, 1911	10 months	
22	James M. Rhoades		Elected May 6, 1912	24 months	
23	Andrew M. Getchel		Elected May 4, 1914	24 months	
24	Herbert T. Wilkinson		Elected May 1, 1916	72 months	
25	William H. Beacom		Elected May 1, 1922	48 months	
26	Robert W. Kemp		Elected May 3, 1926	24 months	
27	William H. Beacom		Elected May 7, 1928	72 months	
28	Ralph L. Arnold		Elected May 10, 1934	32 months	Resigned January 4, 1937
29	Roy F. Hamilton		Acting January 4, 1937	3 months	
30	Dwight M. Mason		Elected April 13, 1937	121 months	
31	Juliet Gregory		Elected May 5, 1947	24 months	
32	Ralph L. Starr		Elected April 29, 1949	62 months	
33	James A. Hart		Elected June 28, 1954	42 months	
*34	Walton R. L. Taylor Jr.		City manager		
*35	Alan Cuthburtson		City manager		
36	Alan Bradley		Elected January 6, 1958	16 months	
37	Walter A. Cash		Elected May 11, 1959	24 months	
38	Wes Waldbillig		Elected May 4, 1961	24 months	
39	Leonard M. Roche		Elected May 6, 1963	3 months	
40	Edward L. Shults		Acting August 26, 1963	2 months	
41	Howard R. Dix		Elected November 1, 1963	42 months	
42	Richard G. Shoup		Elected May 1, 1967	38 months	Resigned July 1, 1970
*	John F. Patterson, Jr.		Acting mayor July 1, 1970	1 week	
43	George Turman		Appointed July 7, 1970	30 months	Resigned December 31, 1972
44	Robert E. Brown		Appointed January 1, 1973	52 months	Elected May 1, 1973
45	William E. Cregg		Elected May 1977	78 months	Re-elected May 1981
46	John H. Toole		Appointed December 12, 1983	25 months	
47	Robert E. Lovegrove		Elected January 1, 1986	48 months	
48	Daniel Kemmis		Elected January 1, 1990	80 months	Resigned September 3, 1996
49	Mike Kadas		Appointed September 3, 1996	112 months	Elected January 1, 1998
50	John Engen		Elected November 8, 2005	200 months	Longest serving mayor; died in office
*	Gwen Jones		Acting mayor August 15, 2022	1 month	
51	Jordan Hess		Appointed September 12, 2022	14 months	Did not run for election in 2023
52	Andrea Davis		Elected November 7, 2023	currently serving	Elected to fill remainder of Engen's term: re-elected November 4, 2025

== See also ==
- 2025 Missoula mayoral election
