= M. Winnifred Feighner =

Marjory Winnifred Feighner (1887 - April 9, 1944) was Assistant Librarian at the University of Montana.

== Early life ==
Marjory Winnifred Feighner was born in 1887 in Missoula, Montana, the daughter of Daniel Rolando Feighner (1847-1915), a Missoula pioneer, and Jennie Monroe (d. 1939). The Feighners moved to Montana in 1882, stopping at Missoula.

Feighner obtained a B.A. at the University of Montana in 1908; she then attended Library School at Simmons College from 1908 to 1909.

== Career ==
Since September 1, 1909, M. Winnifred Feighner was Assistant librarian at University of Montana.

She was interested in civic affairs.

She was a member of Business and Professional Women's Club and the Mortarboard of the Young Women's Christian Association. The Missoula Business and Professional Women’s Club was the first of its kind in Missoula. In 1920 local employed women became affiliated with the National Federation of Business and Professional Women’s Clubs, which had been organized in St. Louis, Mo., in 1919. The local club was chartered in July 1923. The Charter Members were Mrs. Julius (Clara) Hansen, Edith Davies, Laura B. Ellithorpe, Winnifred Woods, Winnifred Feighner, Mrs. Florence Irving Shannon, Amelia Loffnes, Mrs. Mary Ring Walker, and Helen Stoddard. Mrs. Hansen, Mrs. Shannon and Mrs. Walker are still active. The first president was Mabel Humphreys.

In 1939 she joined the American Library Association.

== Personal life ==
M. Winnifred Feighner lived at 315 East Front St., Missoula, Montana.

She died in Bozeman, Montana, on April 9, 1944, and is buried at Missoula Cemetery, Missoula.
