= Lloyd Schermer =

American businessman and artist (born 1927)

Lloyd G. Schermer (born 1927) is an American businessman and artist. He was born in St. Louis, Missouri.

Schermer served in the United States Navy during World War II. He attended Amherst College graduating in 1950, then earned an MBA from Harvard University.

== Career ==
=== Early years ===
Schermer entered general management in 1958 at the Star Courier in Kewanee, Illinois. While in Kewanee, the Star Courier received awards from the Illinois Daily Press Association and the Inland Press Association for community service and local community reporting.

He moved to Missoula, Montana in 1959 where he became publisher of the Missoulian. This is the town in the book: A River Runs Through It. While in Missoula, Schermer was deeply involved in community and state affairs. The newspaper played a leading role in the passage of air and water pollution regulations for the State of Montana (one of the first in the nation), and the creation of the 300,000-acre (1,200 km^{2}) Great Bear Wilderness Area, the 120,000-acre (490 km^{2}) Scapegoat Wilderness Area, which bordered the 1,000,000-acre (4,000 km^{2}) Bob Marshall Wilderness Area, bringing the total of the three to 1,420,000 acres (5,700 km^{2}). The Missoulian was instrumental in restoring the Clark Fork (river) of the Columbia River from a polluted, sterile river to a blue ribbon trout stream today. The paper also played a key role in the creation of a constitutional convention that produced a new state constitution.

=== Middle years ===
During the 1960s, he continued as publisher of the Missoulian in Missoula, Montana. While in Montana he was elected vice president of the Lee Newspapers of Montana, which included Missoula, Billings, Helena, Butte & Livingston. He was elected a director of Lee Enterprises in 1963 and was on the board for thirty-seven years. In 1970 he moved to Iowa and became the chief executive officer of Lee Enterprises, a national newspaper and media company. Schermer was a director and as chairman of the American Newspaper Publishers Association in Washington, DC, now part of the Newspaper Association of America.

In 1972 Lee Enterprises formed a joint-venture with Nippon Paint Company of Osaka, Japan and NAPP Systems, USA (now Macdermid), that manufactured printing plates in a 300,000-square-foot (28,000 m^{2}) facility in San Diego, CA for over 400 newspapers worldwide. Schermer was chairman and CEO of the joint-venture for 12 years.

In 1978, at the end of China's Cultural Revolution he established the first joint venture of an American firm in China with People's Daily. He helped establish the English language newspaper, China Daily, and published China Trade News in this country. He was the first foreigner allowed to make an address in People's Daily. The joint venture placed the first advertising ever carried in People's Daily and other Chinese publications. Lee published several books on China including its first Official Tourist Guide in cooperation with the China International Tourist Agency. The joint venture was given the rights to place all advertising from the West in all of the publications in China. It also had the rights to publish all books coming out of China in the West other than in Japan.

=== Later years ===
In 1991, Schermer was responsible for merging the American Newspaper Publishers Association with the Newspaper Advertising Bureau and 5 other industry associations into the now 1500 member Newspaper Association of America.

Schermer was chairman of the National Board of the Smithsonian Institution for three years and remains on the board as an honorary trustee. In 1994 he received the Smithsonian's highest award, the Joseph Henry Medal. He is on the board of The Anderson Ranch Art Center in Snowmass Village, Colorado as a life trustee, is a lifetime trustee of the Aspen Institute and the University of Montana Foundation, and is a former trustee of the Aspen Center for Environmental Studies, the World Wildlife Fund and the Maureen and Mike Mansfield Foundation.

Schermer Hall on the first floor of the West Wing of the Smithsonian Castle is named after Lloyd G. and Betty A. Schermer.

Schermer resides in Iowa City and Tucson, Arizona. Lloyd and Betty have two sons and five grandchildren.

== Art ==
In 1993, with no previous training, Schermer took courses in drawing and watercolor. Since then, he has exhibited several works of original art. Three of his monotypes were added to the Smithsonian American Art Museum in 2002. He was commissioned to do a type sculpture for the Smithsonian American Art Museum, entitled An America Puzzle He has completed large wood type sculptures for the University of Montana School of Journalism, the University of Iowa School of Journalism in Iowa City, Iowa, the Knight Foundation Board Room in Miami, Florida, the Washington Post building, and the home of New York Times columnist Thomas Friedman.

=== Exhibitions ===
One Person Exhibition: Magidson Fine Art Gallery, Aspen, CO August 9 – 23, 2007
October 14, 2005, Roaring Fork Open Aspen Art Museum, Aspen, CO
Adelson Gallery, The Aspen Institute, Summer 2006
Various Open Exhibitions 1998 – 2003 Red Brick Arts Center, Aspen, CO
The Art Institute of Tucson Gallery, Monotypes and Antique Wood Type Sculpture. December 10, 2010 – February 25, 2011.

=== Public and museum collections ===
Type Sculpture: Live, 47 x 34.5 inches acquired by Library of Congress

Smithsonian American Art Museum, Washington, DC

Type Sculpture: An American Puzzle 48 x 96" completed in 2006 Located on the 3rd Floor of the Luce Foundation Center
Monotypes: 3 monotypes on paper, not currently on view

The Freedom Forum's Newseum, Washington, DC

Type Sculpture: Gutenberg's Puzzle 60 x 120 inches, completed in 2007, Located in the Entrance Lobby of the Newseum

University of Montana, School of Journalism, Missoula, MT

Type Sculpture: Wisdom's Puzzle 36 x 108 inches (2,700 mm), Completed in 2004, installed February 14, 2005 in the Adler Building's Hall of Fame room.

University of Iowa, School of Journalism, Iowa City, IA
Lee Enterprises, Inc. Davenport, IA

Type Sculpture: Wisdom's Puzzle I, 60 x 180 inches (4,600 mm), Installed in the Board Room

The Knight Foundation, Board Room, Miami, FL

Type Sculpture: Wisdom's Puzzle, 48 x 144 inches (3,700 mm), installed in the Knight Foundation Board Room

The Washington Post (CEO's Door), Washington, DC

Type Sculpture: Door Installation, 96 x 36 inches (910 mm), CEO's Office of the Washington Post

The Aspen Institute, Aspen, CO

McCormick Tribune Freedom Museum, Chicago, IL

Type Sculpture: A First Amendment Puzzle, 90 x 44 inches (1,100 mm), Permanent Collection of the Museum

Media, General Corporation, Richmond, VA
Figge Art Museum, Davenport, IA 4 x 8-foot (2.4 m) wall sculpture

=== Commissions ===
Lobby of the Newseum, Washington, DC

Type Sculpture: Gutenberg's Puzzle 60 x 120 inches, completed in 2007, Located in the Entrance Lobby of the Newseum

The New York Times, New York, NY 2007

2 panels 30" x 150" each installed in the 15th floor conference center

Tom Friedman, New York Times columnist, 2007

Type Sculpture: Commission, 43 x 51 inches (1,300 mm), Installed in their home

Board room of Morgan Stanley, New York, NY

Type Sculpture completed 2008

Board room Knight Foundation, Miami, FL

Type Sculpture: Wisdom's Puzzle, 48 x 144 inches (3,700 mm), installed in the Knight Foundation Board Room

Donald Reynolds Foundation, Las Vegas, NV

== Video ==
The Art of Lloyd Schermer: A personal look at Lloyd Schermer and his art. 2007, produced by Digital Arts Foundation, Aspen, CO.
Approximate running time: 36 minutes in 4 parts.

== Author ==
Kicking Rocks by Lloyd Schermer, 2008, Greenwich Publishing Group, hardcover ISBN 978-0944641705
