= Henry C. Myers (Montana politician) =

American politician

Henry Clay Myers

2nd Mayor of Missoula
- In office May 23, 1884 – April 12, 1885
- Preceded by: Frank H. Woody
- Succeeded by: Thomas C. Marshall

Personal details
- Born: February 13, 1836 Fremont, Ohio, US
- Died: December 16, 1929 (aged 93) Missoula, Montana, US
- Profession: City Marshal, Mayor, Postmaster

Henry Clay Myers (February 13, 1836 – December 16, 1929) was an early mayor, constable, city marshal, postmaster, and forest ranger of Missoula, Montana.

Myers was born in Fremont, Ohio, United States. In 1853, at the age of 17, he crossed the plains to California. He first visited Montana in June 1863 or 1865, staying a short time in Big Hole in modern-day Beaverhead County, Montana, before going back to Idaho. In 1866 he followed the old Elk City trail and the Bitter Root Valley to arrive in Missoula, where he stayed the rest of his life. In 1881 he married Mary Elliott (1848–1930), who had arrived in Missoula in 1877 from Indiana.

He was elected city marshal in 1883, and later served 11 months as the second mayor of Missoula, from May 23, 1884, until he was replaced by Thomas C. Marshall on April 13, 1885. After his brief time as mayor, Myers continued to stay active in the regional government. He was part of the 1889 boundary line commission appointed to establish boundary lines between Silver Bow, Deer Lodge, Beaverhead, and Missoula Counties. In March 1891, he was nominated by President Benjamin Harrison to be postmaster of Missoula.
