= Leonard Lopp =

American painter

- Born: Harry Leonard Lopp; May 1, 1888; Highmore, South Dakota, U.S.
- Died: December 3, 1974 (aged 86); Kalispell, Montana, U.S.
- Resting place: C. E. Conrad Memorial Cemetery, Kalispell, Montana, U.S.
- Education: Union College
- Occupations: Painter, muralist
- Spouses: Margaret Booth; Lois Lopp
- Children: 1 son

Leonard Lopp (May 1, 1888 - December 3, 1974) was an American painter and muralist of the Pacific Northwest. He exhibited his work in the United States and Canada, and he did five murals in Kalispell, Montana. His paintings were collected by President Harry Truman and FBI director J. Edgar Hoover. He has restored paintings in the C. M. Russell Museum Complex in Great Falls, Montana.

== Early life ==
Lopp was born on May 1, 1888, in Highmore, South Dakota. He was educated in public schools in Canton and Elk Point, South Dakota, and he graduated from Union College in Nebraska with a degree in Art and Public Speaking. He also studied art in Chicago and Seattle, where he attended the University of Washington.

== Career ==
Lopp became a painter and muralist of the Pacific Northwest. He did five murals in Kalispell, Montana: four in the Conrad National Bank, and one in the Seventh-Day Adventist Church. He was a member of the Montana Institute of the Arts, and he exhibited his work in the United States and Canada. His paintings often came in handmade frames. Lopp also restored paintings in the C. M. Russell Museum Complex in Great Falls, Montana.

Notable collectors included President Harry Truman and FBI director J. Edgar Hoover.

== Personal life and death ==
Lopp was married twice. His first wife was Margaret Booth and his second wife, Louise Lopp. He had a son, Robert.

Lopp died on December 3, 1974, in Kalispell, Montana. His funeral was held at the Seventh-Day Adventist Church, and he was buried in the C. E. Conrad Memorial Cemetery.
