= C. E. Conrad Memorial Cemetery =

Historic cemetery in Kalispell, Montana, US

- C.E. Conrad Memorial Cemetery
- U.S. National Register of Historic Places
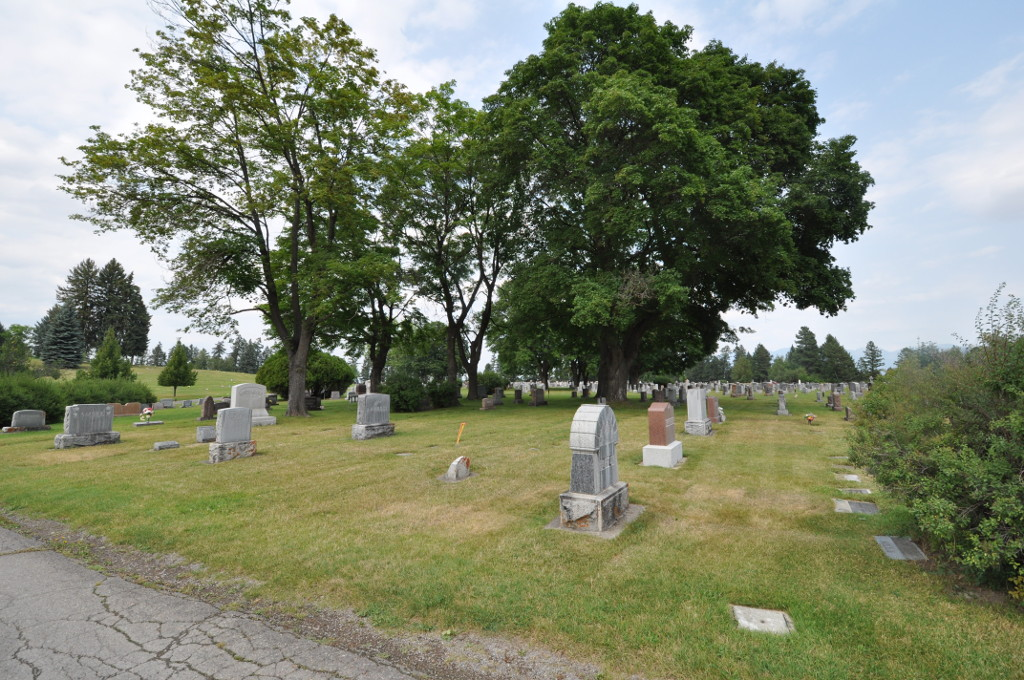

- Location within Montana Location within the United States
- Location: 641 Conrad Dr., Kalispell, Montana
- Coordinates: 48°12′12″N 114°17′20″W
- Area: 87 acres (35 ha)
- Built: 1903
- Architect: Arthur W. Hobert
- Architectural style: Greek Revival
- NRHP reference No.: 12000995
- Added to NRHP: December 5, 2012

The C.E. Conrad Memorial Cemetery in Kalispell, Montana, was listed on the National Register of Historic Places in 2012.

The cemetery is 87 acres (35 ha). The National Register listing included two contributing buildings, two contributing structures, two contributing sites, and two contributing objects.

It was designed as a classic rural cemetery of style occurring on the East coast, and was designed by architect Arthur W. Hobert. It includes Greek Revival architecture and dates from 1903. It was named for Charles E. Conrad, businessman and owner of the Charles E. Conrad Mansion, which is also NRHP-listed.

Created by Alicia B. Conrad, wife of C.E. Conrad, it is operated by a private nonprofit. Notable burials include former Montana Governors John E. Erickson and Robert Burns Smith. Western painter Leonard Lopp is buried here.

== See also ==
- List of cemeteries in Montana

== -External links ==
- C. E. Conrad Memorial Cemetery at Find a Grave
- U.S. Geological Survey Geographic Names Information System: Conrad Memorial Cemetery
