= David D. Bogart =

American politician

6th Mayor of Missoula
- In office May 7, 1888 – May 15, 1889
- Preceded by: Dwight Harding
- Succeeded by: John L. Sloane

Personal details
- Born: March 31, 1860 Dawn Mills, Ontario, Canada
- Died: December 1912 (aged 52) Saltese, Montana, U.S.
- Party: Republican
- Profession: Prospector, County Clerk and Recorder, Mayor

David D. Bogart (March 31, 1860 – December 1912) was County Clerk and Recorder and the 6th Mayor of Missoula, Montana. He was born in Dawn Mills, Ontario, Canada and moved west with the construction of the Northern Pacific Railway until it reached Missoula in 1883. On May 7, 1888, he was elected as Missoula's 6th mayor and five years later would serve as the County Clerk and Recorder. On March 21, 1895 he was appointed Montana's first State Examiner and would act in the position for two years. Finally, he was elected as a state legislator to the 11 Legislative Assembly in 1909 and served a single term in the Montana House of Representatives. In December 1912, Bogart was killed in an avalanche in Saltese, Montana while prospecting for gold.
