= Hammond Lumber Company =

Logging company in Humboldt County, California

Hammond Lumber Company was a logging and resource extraction company operating in Humboldt County, CA.

== History ==
In 1892, Vance Lumber Company purchased the Humboldt Bay frontage from Samoa Land and Improvement Company for construction of a large sawmill. Eureka and Klamath River Railroad was chartered in 1893 to connect the Samoa, CA sawmill and associated worker housing facilities to the city of Arcata and timberlands near the Mad River. The Samoa sawmill was the largest in Humboldt County when purchased by Andrew B. Hammond in 1900.

A sash and door factory was added to the mill complex by 1909, and the company was reorganized as the Hammond Lumber Company in 1912. Hammond Lumber Company built an emergency shipyard during World War I, and seven wooden steam-ships were built at Samoa between 1917 and 1919. The 1921-22 Belcher Atlas of Humboldt County breaks down private and commercial land ownership throughout the county, showing that by 1922, the region of Samoa was parceled into an extractive resource industry. The largest tracts of land belonged to Hammond Lumber Company, while other enterprises included the Little River Redwood Company, the San Francisco Land Company, Big Lagoon Lumber Company, and Dolbeer & Carson Lumber Company, the latter owning the northerly marsh inlets stretching between the modern-day Arcata Bottoms and Mad River. Hammond Lumber Company railroads brought logs and lumber to Samoa from company outposts on the Little River and Big Lagoon until the railway trestles were destroyed by wildfire in 1945.

The Hammond-Little River Redwood Company, Ltd. was formed in a 1931 merger with Hammond Lumber Company. This resulted in the former Little River Redwood Company transferring control of former company towns to Hammond Lumber, such as with Crannell. The Humboldt Northern Railway connection to Samoa was dismantled in 1948.

Hammond became a subsidiary of Georgia-Pacific Corporation in 1956. After Georgia-Pacific was ordered to break up due to a ruling with the Federal Trade Commission, it became incorporated as Louisiana Pacific in 1973. L-P was headed by Harry Merlo and would be based out of Portland, OR for the next 33 years, moving to Nashville in 2004.

== Ships ==
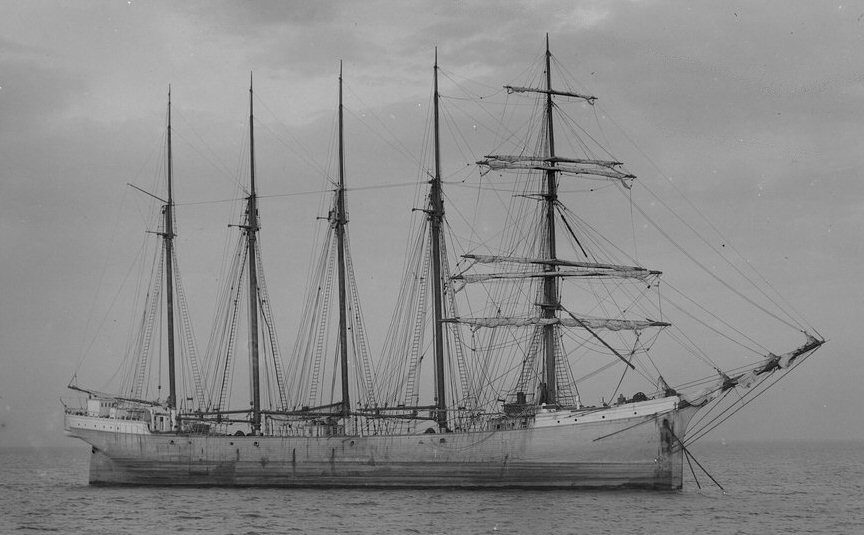
Barquentine Alicia Haviside

Hammond Lumber in Fairhaven, California built: (Hammond Lumber purchased the shipyard in 1910 and sold yard in 1919)

Name	Built for	Date	Notes
Fort Bragg	Higgins & Co.	1910	Wrecked off Coos Bay in 1932
Willamette	McCormick & Co.	1911	Later California 1932, then Susan Olson 1940, wrecked in 1942
Necanicum	Hammond Lumber	1912	Scrapped 1939
Mary Olson	Hammond Lumber	1913	Burnt at Cienfuegos in 1919
Santiam	Hammond Lumber	1916	Burnt at Aberdeen in 1936
Flavel	Hammond Lumber	1917	Wrecked off Carmel in 1923
Trinidad	Hammond Lumber	1918	Wrecked off Willapa in 1937
Halco	Hammond Lumber	1918	Wrecked off Grays Harbor in 1925
SS Bloomington	United States Shipping Board (USSB)	1918	Design 1001 cargo ship, scrapped 1923
SS Saris	USSB	1918	Design 1001 cargo ship laid down as Como for the USSB but completed as Saris, scrapped 1924
SS Keota	USSB	1918	Design 1001 cargo ship, scrapped 1923
SS Darrah	USSB	1919	Design 1001 cargo ship, scrapped 1924/1924
Alicia Haviside	USSB	1919	Design 1001 cargo ship, laid down as Apama for the USSB but completed as barquentine Alicia Haviside
