= Mountview Cemetery, Billings, Montana =

Cemetery in Yellowstone County, Montana

Coordinates: 45°46′00″N 108°33′34″W

Mountview Cemetery
- Interactive map of Mountview Cemetery

Details
- Established: 1920
- Location: Billings, Montana
- No. of graves: Over 25,000

Mountview Cemetery is a city-owned cemetery and was established in 1920 and was merged with Billings Cemetery in Billings, Montana, and is the largest cemetery in the region, with over 25,000 burials and interments.

== Notable burials ==
- Sara E. Morse, Executive Secretary of the Montana Tuberculosis Association
- Daniel Lewis Williams, operatic singer
