= Francis Lyman Worden =

American politician

Frank Worden
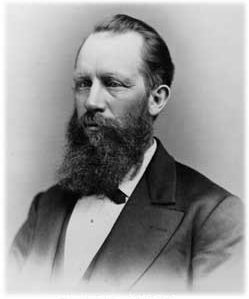
- Born: Francis Lyman Worden; October 15, 1830; Marlboro, Vermont
- Died: February 5, 1887 (aged 56); Missoula, Montana
- Occupation: Businessman
- Known for: Founder of Missoula, Montana

Francis Lyman Worden (October 15, 1830 – February 5, 1887) was a founder of and prominent businessman of Missoula, Montana.

== Early life ==
He was born in Marlboro, Windham County, Vermont, on October 15, 1830.

Worden attended school in New York and worked as a clerk in various stores around the country. After moving to The Dalles, Oregon in the early 1850s, he participated in the Yakima Indian War. Afterward, in 1858, he moved to Walla Walla, Washington. and opened a store there. Worden also worked as postmaster in Walla Walla for two years.

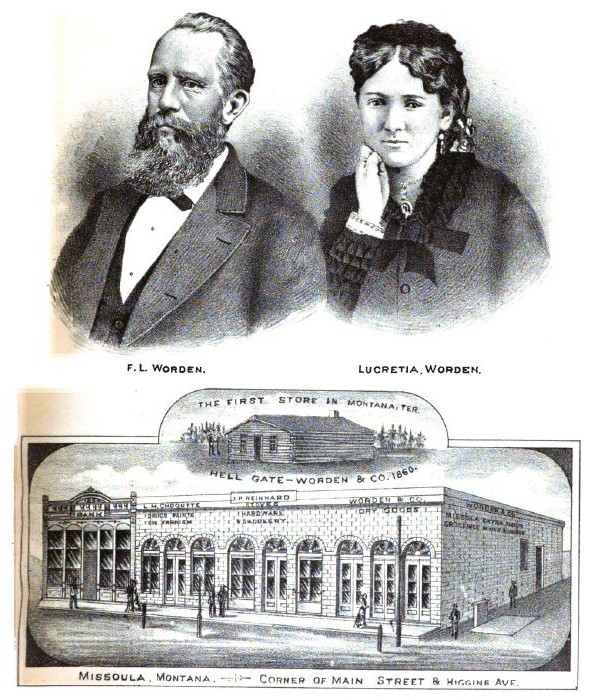
Frank and Lucretia Worden and store, Missoula ca 1885

In 1860, he formed a partnership with Christopher P. Higgins, and they opened a store in Hell Gate, Washington Territory. Later, they moved the business to what is now Missoula, Montana. There, they opened the town's first store, Worden and Company. Soon after, they established several trading posts near gold mining areas in Montana.

== Career ==
In 1863, Worden and Higgins moved to Deer Lodge, Montana, and opened a store there. By 1866, they'd established a full milling operation in Deer Lodge, complete with sawmill and gristmill. In 1868, Worden and Higgins sold their business interests in Deer Lodge and, with Washington J. McCormick, planned 100 acres of the townsite of Missoula.

Worden and Higgins built bridges and roads, established waterworks and a bank, and promoted the town's growth. Both Worden and Higgins had a variety of interests including territorial politics and government. In fact, Worden represented Missoula, Choteau and Deer Lodge counties in Montana's first territorial legislature in Bannack, Mont.

In order to remain competitive, Worden and Company merged with Murphy, Hart and Company, a general merchandise company, to form Murphy-Worden and Company in July 1886. Then, in 1902, the Murphy-Worden Company was replaced by Murphy-Greenough and Company.

While Worden's Market in downtown Missoula is only a few blocks from Worden's historic 1874 townhouse, the city's oldest residence, the two are not related. Worden's Market stems from the Bishop and Worden Grocery established by Tyler Worden and Charles Bishop in 1890 and was originally located at 41 Higgins Ave, in the 'Roberts Block'.

== Personal life ==
Worden married Lucretia Miller at Frenchtown, Montana Territory, in 1866. They had seven children together (Lucina Worden, Henry Worden, Caroline Worden, Louise Worden, Francis Worden, Horace Worden, and Ruth Worden). Worden died on February 5, 1887; his wife Lucretia died in 1893. They're buried in Missoula Cemetery.
