= Christopher P. Higgins =

American politician

Capt. Christopher Powers Higgins
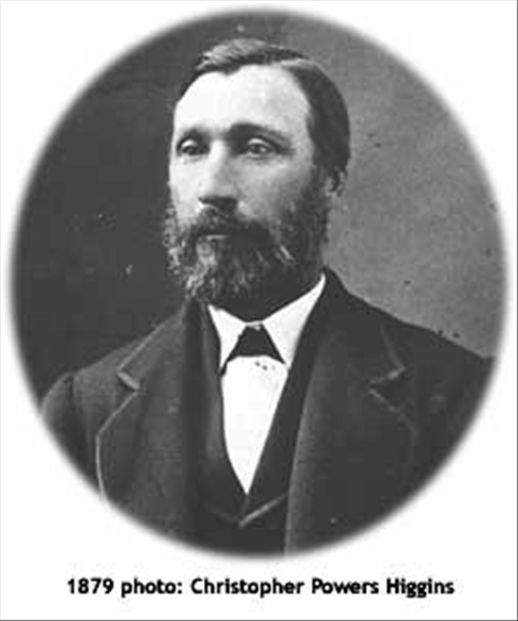
- Born: March 16, 1830; Ireland
- Died: October 14, 1889 (aged 59); Missoula, Montana
- Occupations: Army captain, businessman, County commissioner, Territory legislator
- Known for: Founder of Hellgate Trading Post and Missoula, Montana
- Spouse: Juliet P. Grant
- Children: 7 Mayor Frank Higgins

Capt. Christopher Powers Higgins (March 16, 1830 – October 14, 1889) was an American Army captain and later businessman who with Frank Worden founded the Hellgate Trading Post and the nearby city of Missoula, Montana. He erected one of the first lumber and flouring mills on the Clark Fork River near present Downtown Missoula as well as many of Missoula's first buildings and establishments. He was one of the original county commissioners, member of first legislature of the Montana Territory, and incorporator of The Montana Historical Society. Higgins Avenue and bridge as well as the Higgins block in Downtown Missoula are named after him. He is buried in Missoula Cemetery.

== Early life ==
Christopher P. Higgins was born in Ireland March 16, 1830. He immigrated to the United States in 1848, immediately moved to the western frontier and joined the army. In 1853 in joined newly designated Washington Territory Governor Isaac Stevens and Lieut. John Mullan as wagon master for the Stevens survey of the Bitterroot and Missoula Valleys, done for the planned construction of a railroad through to region to connect the Mississippi River with the Pacific Ocean. Governor Stevens, also acting as Superintendent of Indian Affairs, signed the Hellgate treaty to which Higgins was a witness with the Bitterroot Salish, Pend d'Oreille, and the Kootenai tribes that guaranteed passage.

== Founding of Missoula ==
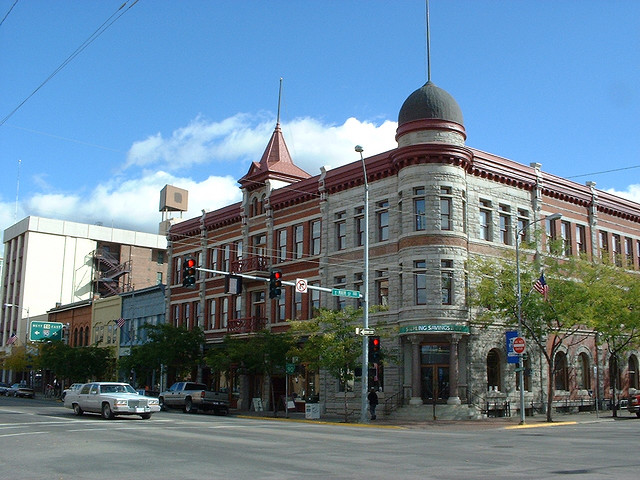
Higgins Block

In 1860 Higgins partnered with Frank Worden, a general merchandise store owner in Washington to set up the Hellgate Trading Post in the Missoula Valley along the Mullan Road, which had only just reached the area that summer. On March 30, 1863, Higgins married Juliet P Grant, the daughter of another Missoula pioneer Richard Grant (for whom Grant Creek is named). Hellgate would never grow very large because the water supply was unsuitable to power the lumber and flour mills Higgins and Worden wanted to construct. The settlement was moved four miles east to the location of today's Downtown Missoula in 1865 and renamed Missoula Mills. In 1873, Higgins organized the Missoula National Bank as one of the first banks in Montana Territory and located it next to his and Worden's store built two years earlier and now called the Worden & Company Store. The store itself had, in fact, been built on the location of Higgins' former log home before he constructed a larger home several blocks east. In 1888, Higgins began construction of the Higgins Block but died before its opening in 1889. The building is now on the National Register of Historic Places.

== Rivalry with A. B. Hammond ==
Andrew B. Hammond arrived in Missoula in 1872 and within four years he was an owner and managing partner of the Eddy, Hammond and Company (reorganized as the Missoula Mercantile in 1885), which soon replaced Worden and Company as the leading mercantile in western Montana. As the construction of the Northern Pacific Railroad approached Missoula, both Higgins and Hammond wanted to ensure the railroad would stop there. Higgins and Worden offered prime real estate to the rail line with the hope of ensuring not only a stop, but the lumber contract for the ties, bridges, and buildings that would need to be constructed. The city secured the railroad, but Eddy, Hammond and Company received the lumber contract.

In 1881, Hammond began buying stock in Higgins' Missoula National Bank and by 1888 Higgins was forced out and the bank's name changed to First National Bank of Missoula. Higgins rivalry with Hammond would last until his death in 1889, and would continue with his family. C. P.'s son Frank G. Higgins would become mayor of Missoula in 1892 despite opposition from Hammond, and two years later when the Higgins Avenue Bridge was to be replaced there was debate as to whether the bridge should go straight across north-and-south or diagonal toward the Bitterroot with the Higgins preferring the latter. When it was put to a vote, Higgins prevailed.

== Legacy ==
Higgins' name is given to both Higgins Avenue and the Higgins Avenue Bridge where the numeric center of Missoula is. On land donated to the city for the construction of the University of Montana in 1893, the streets are named after Higgins' seven children: Francis, Maurice, Arthur, Helen, Hilda, Ronald, and Gerald. The name Gerald Avenue, in fact, replaced what was once named Hammond Avenue after Andrew Hammond.
