= Washington J. McCormick =

American politician

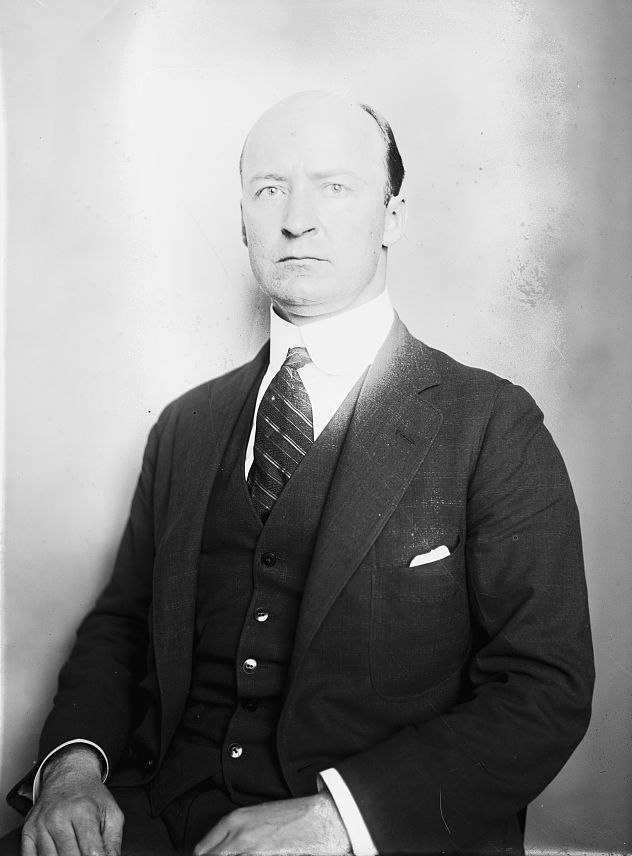

Member of the U.S. House of Representatives from Montana's 1st district
- In office March 4, 1921 – March 3, 1923
- Preceded by: John M. Evans
- Succeeded by: John M. Evans

Member of the Montana House of Representatives
- In office 1918-1920

Personal details
- Born: January 4, 1884 Missoula, Montana
- Died: March 7, 1949 (aged 65) Missoula, Montana
- Party: Republican
- Education: University of Montana; University of Notre Dame; Harvard University; Columbia University

Washington Jay McCormick, Jr. (January 4, 1884 – March 7, 1949) was a U.S. representative from Montana.

Born in Missoula, Montana, McCormick attended the University of Montana and the University of Notre Dame in Indiana. He is named after his father, Washington J. McCormick, a prominent Missoula citizen. He graduated from Harvard University in 1906 and from the law department of Columbia University, New York City, in 1910. He was admitted to the New York bar the same year. He returned to Missoula, Montana and admitted to the Montana bar in 1911, engaging in the practice of law. He served as member of the Montana House of Representatives from 1918 to 1920.

McCormick was elected as a Republican to the Sixty-seventh Congress (March 4, 1921 - March 3, 1923), but was unsuccessful in his reelection bid in 1922 to the Sixty-eighth Congress. He continued the practice of law until his retirement, when he devoted his time to writing.

In 1923, a bill drafted by McCormick became the first proposed legislation regarding the United States' national language that would have made "American" the national language in order to differentiate American English from British English.

McCormick allowed his family ranch at Fort Owen to become a state park. He resided in the Bitter Root Valley, near Stevensville, Montana, until his death in Missoula, Montana, March 7, 1949.

He was interred in Missoula Cemetery.

U.S. House of Representatives
Preceded by John M. Evans	Member of the U.S. House of Representatives from Montana's 1st congressional district 1921–1923	Succeeded by John M. Evans
