= Frank G. Higgins =

American football player, lawyer, and politician (1864–1905)

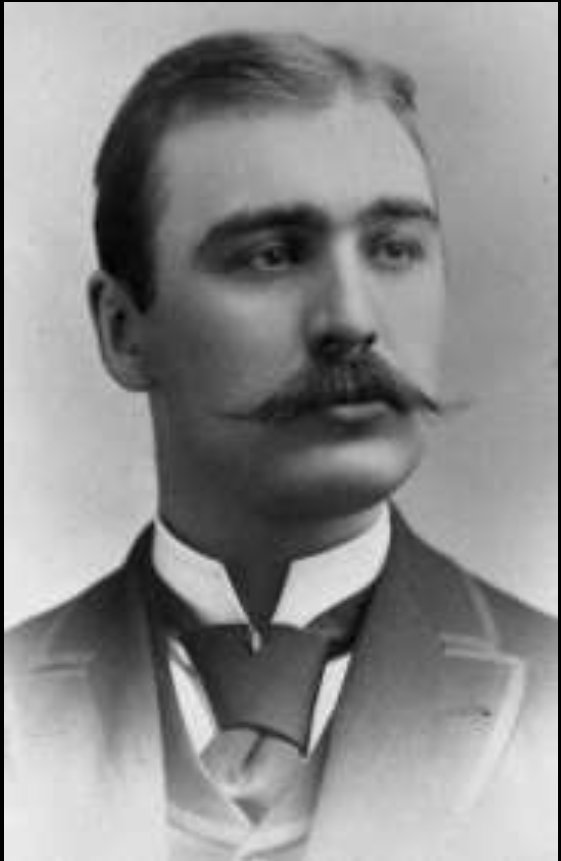
- Frank G. Higgins, 1891

4th Lieutenant Governor of Montana
- In office January 7, 1901 – October 15, 1905
- Governor: Joseph Toole
- Preceded by: Archibald E. Spriggs
- Succeeded by: Edwin L. Norris

Member of the Montana House of Representatives

Personal details
- Born: December 28, 1864 Hell Gate, Montana
- Died: October 15, 1905 (aged 40) Portland, Oregon
- Citizenship: United States
- Education: University of Michigan
- Known for: Football player/Politician

Francis Grant Higgins (December 28, 1864 – October 15, 1905) was an American football player, lawyer and politician. He played college football at the University of Michigan. He was the first native-born person from Montana to become a member of the state's bar and of the state's legislature. He served in the Montana House of Representatives and was elected as the mayor of Missoula, Montana in 1892. He was the fourth Lieutenant Governor of Montana from 1901 to 1905.

== Early years ==
Higgins was born in 1864 at Hell Gate, Montana, near the site of what would become Missoula, Montana. He was the son of Julia Grant and Christopher Powers Higgins (1830–1889), an early Montana pioneer and the founder of the city of Missoula. He attended the public schools of Missoula and graduated in 1881 from the military school in Faribault, Minnesota. He was sent east to attend the Phillips Exeter Academy at Exeter, New Hampshire.

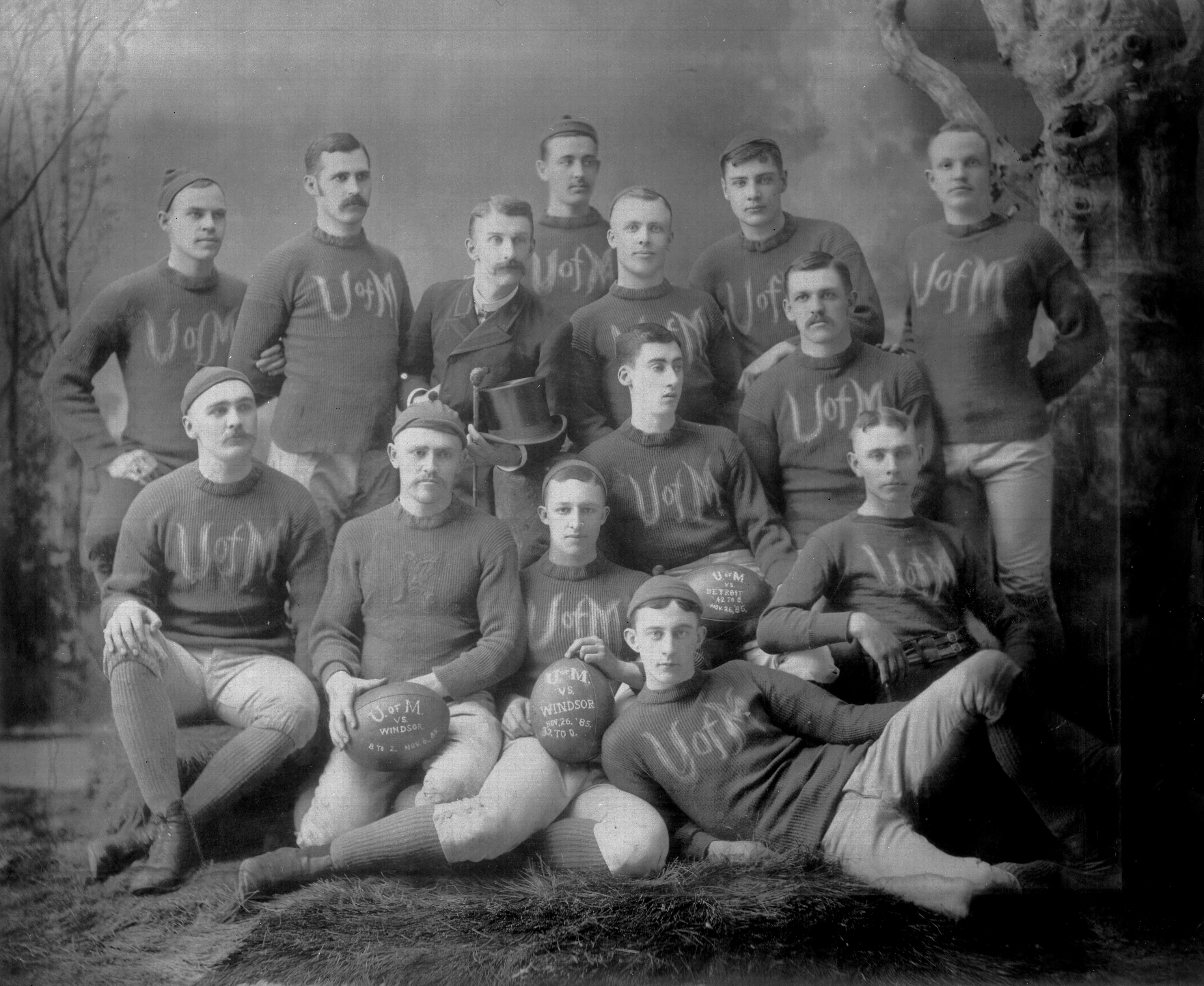
University of Michigan football team, 1885

Higgins subsequently enrolled at the University of Michigan where he studied law and played college football as a forward for the undefeated 1885 Michigan Wolverines football team.

== Legal and political career ==
After graduating from Michigan in 1886, Higgins returned to Missoula where he practiced law. He was the first person born in Montana to be admitted to the Montana state bar. In the late 1880s, he gave up the practice of law to become president of the Higgins Bank in Missoula. He subsequently began a political career and became the first native-born person from Montana to be elected to the Montana state legislature and as a mayor. He served in the Montana House of Representatives upon Montana's admission to the United States starting in 1889. He served in both the first and second sessions of the Montana legislature.

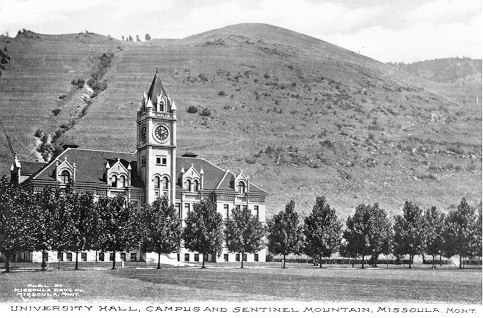
University (Main) Hall circa 1900

Higgins is credited with the decision to locate the University of Montana at Missoula, having introduced the bill into the state legislature providing for the establishment of a state university in Missoula. He was elected as the mayor of Missoula in May 1892 and served a one-year term. He was also a delegate from Montana to 1892 Democratic National Convention.

During the Spanish–American War, Higgins served two years as a captain in Company F of the United States volunteers. He was a member of the Grisby Rough Riders during the Battle at Chickamauga. He was elected as the Lieutenant Governor of Montana in 1900 and served in that office from 1901 to 1905. After being elected to the office in 1900, Higgins spoke of his campaign and said "he had tackled the sheep herders, cowboys, miners and lumber jacks, and, of course, liked the miners best of all."

== Family and death ==
Higgins married Barbara Hayes from Ontario, Canada in September 1892. They had one son, Grant Higgins.

Higgins died in November 1905 at St. Vincent's hospital in Portland, Oregon. He died from complications of diseases contracted while serving in the Spanish–American War. After suffering a relapse, he was taken to Portland in the hope that "the climatic conditions would help to remove the severe strain to his nervous system." At the time of his death, the Anaconda Standard published extensive tributes to the late lieutenant governor. One colleague noted: "Frank G. Higgins was a scholar, one who read a great deal and always of the best. The classics and works of political economy were his favorite books. He cared not for fiction, but dwelt on facts. He cared but little for poetry, save the poetry of the rushing mountain stream and the music of the wind through the trees of his native heath."

== See also ==
- 1885 Michigan Wolverines football team
- Lieutenant Governor of Montana

Political offices
Preceded by Archibald E. Spriggs	Lieutenant Governor of Montana; 1901–1905	Succeeded by Edwin L. Norris
