= Missoula Cemetery =

Cemetery in Missoula, Montana, United States

Coordinates: 46°53′35″N 114°01′15″W

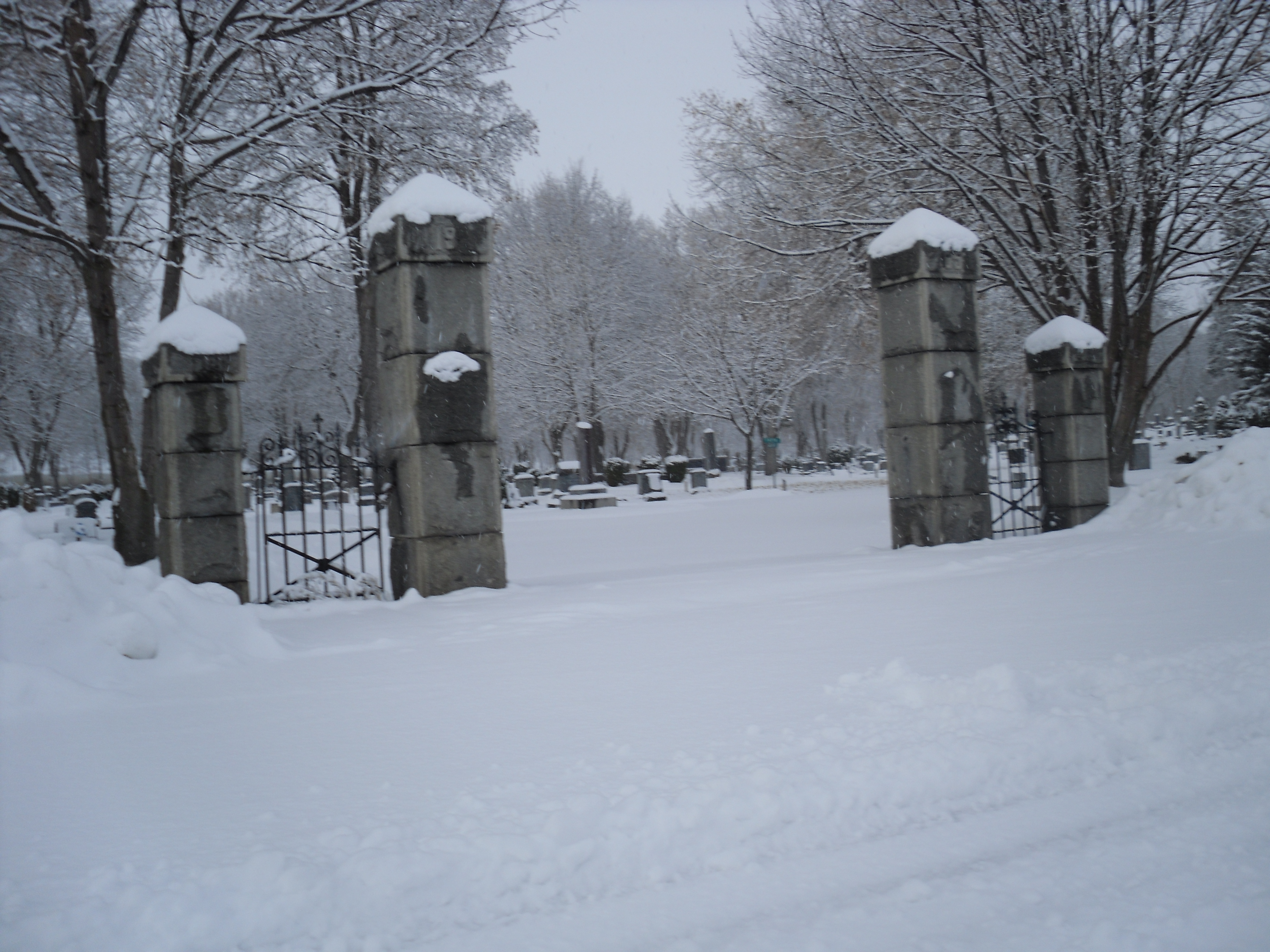
- These are the original stone column gates to the Missoula Cemetery first erected in 1884
- Interactive map of Missoula Cemetery

Details
- Established: 1884
- Location: Missoula, Montana
- Size: 80 acres (32 ha)

Missoula Cemetery is the second oldest cemetery located in Missoula, Montana, with Fort Missoula Cemetery being the oldest. The Missoula Cemetery was first established in 1884 by the Missoula Valley Improvement Company, a corporation owned by prominent citizens Isadore Cohn, Frank Woody, William H.H. Dickinson and Thomas C Marshall. The land where the cemetery would be built was purchased from the Northern Pacific Railroad for $168. The cemetery was eventually sold to the City of Missoula in 1901, for the total of $1.

== History ==
The Missoula Cemetery was created in 1884 to house those who had succumbed to the harsh life of a small mill town. The cemetery initially had very wide-set roads for easy access by wagon. Eventually, the waning use of wagons made the wide roads obsolete and the cemetery had to be renovated. The roads through the cemetery have since been narrowed to allow for more plots. The Missoula Cemetery has many of the town's original founders buried there. C. P. Higgins and his family, who once had their graves at the base of Whitaker Hill on the southern side of Missoula, now have their bodies buried in the Missoula Cemetery.

== Location and expansion ==
The Missoula Cemetery began as a small 16-acre (65,000 m^{2}) plot of land purchased out of necessity. The lack of modern medicine, prominence of disease, paired with the dangerous habits of the late 19th-century West made life expectancy low and dictated the need for a cemetery. The original founders, the Missoula Valley Improvement Company, owned the cemetery for many years, only relinquishing it to the City of Missoula in 1901. Upon purchasing the land, the City Council appointed the first Board of Trustees to manage the maintenance of the cemetery. It consisted of Samuel Bellew, Harriet Keith, E. A. Winstanley, Mrs. F. H. Woody, Lizzie Mills and Lucinda Worden. The current trustees are Marjorie Jacobs, Sharee Fraser, Carol Gorden, Patrick J. McHugh and Mary Lou Cordis.

The Missoula Cemetery still holds the same location as when it was founded in 1884, about three miles (5 km) northwest of the city's center. The cemetery has since grown from 16 acres (65,000 m^{2}) to a total of approximately 80 acres (320,000 m^{2}). Only 40 acres (160,000 m^{2}) of the plots are occupied by graves. The remaining 40 have been purchased by the City of Missoula for further expansion and development.

== Prominent graves ==
Some of the more prominent locals of Missoula's past have bold elaborate tombstones to commemorate their lives, like Francis Worden's large marble tombstone. Others are made of simple marble that masks their renowned accomplishments in life, like Jeanette Rankin's black stone with a plainly marked face. Below is a short list of some of the better-known characters of Missoula's past, beginning with their name and followed by their death date.

- Christopher P. Higgins – 10/14/1889 co-founder of Missoula and a member of Missoula's first Territorial Legislature.
- Francis L. Worden – 2/5/1887 co-founder of Missoula and successful businessman. He soon became Higgins' political enemy.
- Edward L. Bonner – 7/10/1902 A prominent businessman who collaborated with A.B. Hammond to found the Missoula Mercantile in the early 1880s. The town of Bonner, Montana, is named after him.
- Daniel E. Bandmann – 11/23/1905 Actor and rancher. He gave his name to the location of Bandmann flats that lay just east of Bonner, Montana.
- Thomas L. Greenough – 7/23/1911 Settler who built a mansion and formed Greenough Park, 25 miles (40 km) east of Missoula, Montana.
- James H.T. Ryman – 5/31/1926 Head principal of public schools and served as trustee to the public library for 30 years.
- Emma Dickenson – 1/1/1927 Missoula's first teacher.
- A. J. Gibson – 12/31/1927 One of Missoula's first architects who began building the University of Montana campus in Missoula, starting with University Hall.
- M. Winnifred Feighner – 4/9/1944, Assistant librarian at University of Montana and daughter of Missoula pioneers Daniel R. Feighner and Jennie Monroe
- Jeanette P. Rankin – 5/8/1973 She is not actually buried in the Missoula cemetery, but it hosts a memorial to her life. She was the first woman to ever be elected to the U.S. Congress. Her legacy greatly outstands her tombstone, which simply says her name, birth and death date.
- Harry F. Adams – 11/24/1977 Head coach of the track and field team for the University of Montana for over 35 years. He was additionally a veteran of both the First and Second World War.

== Unmarked graves ==
In 1903, the Northern Pacific Railway purchased nearly 400 gravesites in Missoula's Cemetery for Japanese laborers who worked for the railway company. These sites were bought for the purpose of burying 100 bodies of those who died while working on the railroad in Plains, Montana.

Most of these sites remain unmarked, with a select few bearing Japanese script across the tombstones. Japanese tombstones were typically made of standard marble and stood at about three feet off the ground. Most of the Japanese grave sites in Missoula's cemetery have no markings of this kind. This is due in part to the fact that Japanese immigrants didn't always bring their entire families over; therefore there was no one to write an epitaph for them.

In 1864, Congress made it possible for the Northern Pacific Railway to purchase and advance production on nearly 14 million acres of land between Minnesota and Oregon, which is how so many Japanese ended up in the Missoula Cemetery. Missoula's own A.B. Hammond collaborated with the Northern Pacific and create wood mills, railroad ties, and other essentials for the railroad and its workers.

== Books ==
- Grave Matters: a journey through the modern funeral industry to a natural way of burial ISBN 978-0-7432-7768-6
- Rest In Peace: a cultural history of death and the funeral home in twentieth-century America ISBN 0-19-513608-X

== See also ==
- List of cemeteries in Montana
