= Hell Gate, Montana =

Ghost town in the state of Montana

- Ghost town
- Location within Montana Location within the United States
- Coordinates: 46°53′00″N 114°05′13″W
- Country: United States
- State: Montana
- County: Missoula
- Established: 1860
- Abandoned: 1866
- Elevation: 3,124 ft (952 m)

Hell Gate (sometimes known as Hell Gate Ronde, Hell's Gate or Hellgate) is a ghost town at the western end of the Missoula Valley in Missoula County, Montana, United States. The town was located on the banks of the Clark Fork River roughly five miles downstream from present-day Missoula near what is now Frenchtown.

== Geography ==
Hell Gate lay at the west end of the Missoula Valley. About 13,000 BCE, the advance of the Cordilleran Ice Sheet created an ice dam on the Clark Fork which created Glacial Lake Missoula. After the Missoula Floods and the final draining of Glacial Lake Missoula about 11,000 BCE, the lake sediment dried and became the fertile Missoula Valley.

The Hell Gate Valley is framed by the Rattlesnake Mountains to the north and northeast and the Bitterroot Mountains to the southeast, south, and west. Since the early 1900s, the area has been surrounded by the Lolo National Forest. The eastern mouth of the valley is defined by a narrow pass between Mount Jumbo and Mount Sentinel, which leads to Hellgate Canyon. The western mouth is less well-defined and narrow, and leads to Ninemile Divide.

The community of Hell Gate was located at 46°53′0″N 114°5′13″W (46.8832566, -114.0870563), at an elevation of 3,123 feet (952 m).

== Native American and western settlement ==
Members of the Bitterroot Salish (or Flathead) Native American tribe often traveled through the Missoula Valley on their way east to bison hunting grounds. As the Salish passed through the valley's narrow eastern and western mouths, members of the Blackfeet tribe would often attack and kill them. The Salish called the valley lm-i-sul-étiku, which transliterally means "by the cold, chilling waters" but which the Salish used metaphorically to mean "the place chilled with fear". The entire valley was heavily wooded, and ideal for ambush.

The first Euro-Americans to see the Missoula Valley were the members of the Lewis and Clark Expedition, who explored the Clark Fork River on their way back east after reaching the Pacific Ocean. Meriwether Lewis and a small group of men passed through the Missoula Valley and camped near the confluence of Rattlesnake Creek and the Clark Fork on July 4, 1806. English-Canadian explorer David Thompson visited the area in 1811, and mapped much of the valley and the surrounding peaks (including Mount Jumbo).

French trappers passing through the valley in the 1820s were horrified to see so many remains of Salish in the deep canyons which formed the valley's entrances, and called the valley "Porte de l'Enfer," or the "Hell Gate." The next known European person to visit the area was the British fur trapper Alexander Ross in 1824. In 1841, the Roman Catholic priest Father Pierre-Jean De Smet passed through the Hell Gate Valley, bringing with him what were probably the first wagons and oxen to enter what would eventually become Montana. Jesuit missionaries soon followed and settled in the Hell Gate Valley (as the Missoula Valley was then known), but did not remain due to the hostility of local Indian tribes.

In 1852, Métis explorer Francois Finlay (also known as "Benetsee") discovered gold in what is now Gold Creek near the eastern mouth of the valley, but it was not a commercially viable deposit and no gold rush occurred. A year later, Isaac Stevens, Governor of the Washington Territory (which at the time included western Montana), led a railroad survey party through the valley. Impressed with the suitability of the entire western Montana area for white settlement, Stevens negotiated the 1855 Hell Gate Treaty, signed by the Bitterroot Salish, Pend d'Oreilles, and Kootenai tribes at Council Grove near Hell Gate, which established the Flathead Indian Reservation. Peace with the local Native American tribes increased traffic in the area, and the Hell Gate Valley became the preferred transportation route from Montana to the west. Significant numbers of pack mule trains traveled through the valley, eventually leading to the settlement of Hell Gate itself. The Mullan Road approached the area in the winter of 1859-1860.

== Founding and growth ==
The first settlers in the Hell Gate Valley arrived in late December 1856 to begin preparations for a permanent settlement (Hell Gate). This first group of men consisted of Judge Frank H. Woody, James Holt, Bill Madison, Bill "Pork" West, and a man with the last name of Jackson. They cut timber for the settlement throughout the winter, and in the spring moved to the future site of Hell Gate where they raised cattle and established the first garden and farm in the valley. In the fall of 1857, they built two houses with the timber they had cut. A handful of additional settlers took up residence in the valley from 1857 to 1895.

The settlement of Hell Gate (also known as Hellgate Trading Post) was founded in 1860 by Frank L. Worden and Captain Christopher P. Higgins. Higgins had come through the Hell Gate Valley with Governor Isaac Stevens' railroad scouting party in 1853, and now the two men built a log cabin and turned it into a store. Worden and Higgins had intended to settle at Fort Owen in the Bitterroot Valley, but instead chose the Hell Gate Valley because it was halfway between Fort Owen and the federal government trading post at Jocko on the new Indian reservation. This, they believed, would draw more traffic than a store closer to either existing settlement. The Worden and Higgins store was the first commercial building in the state of Montana not classified as a trading post. In August 1860, Worden and Higgins brought a pack train of 76 mules over the Mullan Road from Walla Walla to stock the store. Their goods included the first safe in the region. Several other cabins were soon built around the store that same year. One of the town's first residents was Judge Frank H. Woody of Walla Walla. The store was set up in a tent (the town's first structure), but purchased hewn cottonwood tree logs from David Patee, a white settler who had settled near the eastern mouth of the Hell Gate Valley, and quickly built a 16 foot by 18 foot (4.9 meter by 5.5 meter) rectangular building with a sod roof. The men were joined by the town's fourth resident, a French citizen named Narcisse Sanpar. Another new resident was "Captain" Richard Grant, the father of Johnny Grant (co-founder of the Grant-Kohrs Ranch), and who along with David Patee had helped supply the logs the Worden and Higgins store was built with. In December 1860, the Territorial Legislature of the Washington Territory (which at that time included much of what is today western Montana) organized a system of county government, and established Missoula County. Hell Gate was named the county seat, and Montana's first county election was held there in 1861. Montana's first trial was also held in the town (in Bolte's saloon) in 1862 (a man sued a local farmer for killing a horse he had leased to him).

Hell Gate grew quickly. Worden and Higgins built a second store in 1861. W.B.S. Higgins built the town's first residence in early 1861, and P.J. Bolte its second in the autumn of that year (it doubled as a saloon). John Mullan established "Cantonment Wright" at the confluence of the Blackfoot and Hell Gate rivers in November 1861 in preparation for completion of the Mullan Road. The Road reached the Hell Gate Valley in 1862, bringing additional white settlers into the area. What is likely the first wedding of white Americans in the state of Montana occurred at Hell Gate on March 5, 1862 (George P. White married Mrs. Josephine Mineinger), and the first white American child was born in the county of Missoula was born near Hell Gate on February 13, 1862. The first lawsuit in the state also occurred at Hell Gate in March 1862 (a man sued a farmer for killing a horse that the man had leased to him). The arrival of the Mullan Road led to the establishment of a stagecoach station in the town. Goods brought by steamboat up the Clark Fork to the Cabinet Rapids were transported over a new, groomed trail which connected with the Mullan Road just west of town. Camel pack trains took goods and gold regularly over the Mullan Road to the rapidly growing Inland Empire. Sometimes as many as five pack trains a day passed through Hell Gate. At times, goods were so plentiful that they sold for less than they did at their starting point in St. Louis, Missouri. The first post office in Montana was established at Hell Gate on November 24, 1862.

In 1863, the discovery of gold at Alder Gulch brought hundreds of settlers to the region, allowing Hell Gate to prosper. That year, Henry Buckhouse built the town's first and only blacksmith shop. St. Michael's Roman Catholic Church, the first Christian church (rather than mission) in the state of Montana, was built in the small town in 1863. Catholic missionaries also built St. Peter's Mission in the town, served as a base for missionary work from the 1860s to 1884 (even surviving Hell Gate's abandonment). The United States Congress organized the Montana Territory on May 26, 1864. The new territorial legislature recognized the county of Missoula, and placed the county seat at Hell Gate. In the summer of 1864, Tyler Woodward of the firm of Woodward & Clements built a second store in Hell Gate and P.J. Shockley built a boarding house. When the Montana Territory was organized, Woodward was elected Missoula County commissioner, and was postmaster in Hell Gate.

== Death in Hell Gate ==
Hell Gate was the scene of notorious lynchings in 1864. Once in the town's history, the Worden and Higgins store had been robbed. Cyrus Skinner, a member of Henry Plummer's "road agent" gang, and other members of the Plummer gang took up residence in Hell Gate in late 1863 and began a reign of terror against the townspeople. Bolte's saloon had gone out of business in 1862, but Skinner bought the place in 1863 and reopened the bar. Skinner himself preferred to sit on the safe in the original Higgins and Worden store, leading many in the town to believe that the Plummer gang intended to rob the safe of its $65,000 in gold dust. On the night of January 27, 1864, a group of 21 vigilantes (part of the notorious Montana Vigilantes, who had instituted a reign of terror of their own in the state) from Alder Gulch rode into Hell Gate and rounded up Skinner and the other outlaws. A brief trial was held in Worden and Higgins' store, and four members of the Plummer gang were sentenced to death. Skinner and two others were hanged from a pole which was ripped loose from the town corral and put upright. One was hanged in a barn next to the store, another from a tree outside the store.

In March 1864, several young Pend d'Oreilles Indian men (led by the chief's son) killed a prospector near the town of Clinton, Montana. The townspeople of Hell Gate, worried that an Indian uprising might begin, sent for help to the town of Alder Gulch. The Pend d'Oreilles tribe, worried about retaliation, forced their chief to turn his son over to the people of Hell Gate. After a very brief trial, the young man was hanged from a pole in the town corral.

Additional deaths also occurred in the town. In the autumn of 1864, a settler named Matt Craft shot and killed a young man named Crow after Crow allegedly insulted Craft's wife at the tent the couple lived in. At about the same time, William Cook reopened the town saloon. Two Irishmen, McLaughlin and Doran, got into an argument while playing cards and exchanged gunfire in the saloon. McLaughlin was killed, but Doran escaped uninjured. Doran was arrested, but released. Cook, the saloonkeeper, was also shot and died a few days later. The last death in the town was that of J.P Shockley, who committed suicide in the early spring of 1865.

== Abandonment ==
Hell Gate collapsed as a settlement in 1865. The settlement had reached a grand total of 20 residents. But Worden and Higgins built a sawmill, flour mill, and new store at the site of present-day Missoula, and all the residents of Hell Gate moved to the new town practically overnight. Rather than take the town name with them, they adopted as the new name of their town the Salish word for the area where the Clark Fork river enters the valley, "Missoula." The only residents were farmers, who had settled nearby. The county seat was moved from Hell Gate to Missoula in 1866. From 1887 until his death in 1905, the German-American Shakespearean actor Daniel E. Bandmann operated a ranch near Hell Gate in an area now known as Bandmann Flats. During this time he introduced to Montana McIntosh red apples, Percheron horses, Holstein cattle and several exotic breeds of chickens and pigs.

By 1913, little was left of the town (which was now part of a privately owned ranch) except for a few buildings and four burial mounds of the Plummer gang. The site of the ghost town was featured as a stop on a self-guided tour promoted in a guide book to the state of Montana written by the Federal Writers' Project in 1939.

== The Hellgate area ==
The Hell Gate has lent its name to several nature and man-made features in the area, including the valley itself, which became known in the 1800s as the Hell Gate Valley. Hell Gate was also the original name of the Clark Fork River, which original settlers believed was formed at the confluence of the Clark Fork and Blackfoot River at the eastern mouth of the Missoula Valley. Although the river and valley would be renamed, the steep gorge cut by the Clark Fork to the east of the Missoula Valley is still known as Hellgate Canyon.

The U.S. Postal Service had historical post offices 11/25/1862 - 5/14/1865, 8/28/1867 - 8/09/1869, and 10/13/1870 - 9/01/1871. It currently maintains a Hell Gate Station in downtown Missoula.

The Missoula County Public School System operates Hellgate High School, one of the oldest and largest high schools in the state of Montana. It also operates Hellgate Elementary School.

In addition to the above, the area has also been Hellgate Township and Hellgate Voting Precinct which were used as census districts from 1900-1920.
