= Willapa, Washington =

- CDP
- Location in the state of Washington
- Coordinates: 46°40′32″N 123°39′53″W
- Country: United States
- State: Washington
- County: Pacific
- Foundation: 1852

Area
  - Total: 0.278 sq mi (0.720 km^{2})
  - Land: 0.278 sq mi (0.720 km^{2})
  - Water: 0 sq mi (0.000 km^{2})
- Elevation: 26 ft (7.9 m)

Population (2010)
  - Total: 210
- Population as of 2010 U.S. Census
- Time zone: UTC−8 (PST)
  - Summer (DST): UTC−7 (PDT)
- ZIP Code: 98577
- Area code(s): 360, 564
- FIPS code: 53-78995
- GNIS feature ID: 2586751

Willapa is a census-designated place (CDP) in Pacific County, Washington, east of the city of Raymond. As of the 2020 census, Willapa had a population of 208. The name comes from that of the Willapa people, an Athapaskan-speaking people, now extinct, who occupied the Willapa River valley, which was similarly named after the Willapa people, along which the census-designated place Willapa is located.

== History ==
The town is actually one of the oldest European-founded towns in the area, being founded back in 1852. The first name was "Woodard’s Landing", named after Samuel Lowell Woodard, the first settler within the town. The current name was only adopted after the establishment of the first postal office in the area.

== Geography ==
According to the United States Census Bureau, the CDP has a total area of 0.28 square miles (0.73 km^{2}), of which all of it (100.0%) is land and none of it (0.0%) is water.

== Demographics ==
Historical population
| Census | Pop. | Note | %± |
|---|---|---|---|
| 2010 | 210 | | — |
| 2020 | 208 | | −1.0% |
U.S. Decennial Census; 2000 2010

Willapa first appeared as a census designated place in the 2010 U.S. census.

=== Racial and ethnic composition ===
Willapa CDP, Washington – Racial and ethnic composition Note: the US Census treats Hispanic/Latino as an ethnic category. This table excludes Latinos from the racial categories and assigns them to a separate category. Hispanics/Latinos may be of any race.
| Race / Ethnicity (NH = Non-Hispanic) | Pop 2010 | Pop 2020 | % 2010 | % 2020 |
|---|---|---|---|---|
| White alone (NH) | 197 | 179 | 93.81% | 86.06% |
| Black or African American alone (NH) | 0 | 0 | 0.00% | 0.00% |
| Native American or Alaska Native alone (NH) | 4 | 2 | 1.90% | 0.96% |
| Asian alone (NH) | 0 | 3 | 0.00% | 1.44% |
| Native Hawaiian or Pacific Islander alone (NH) | 0 | 0 | 0.00% | 0.00% |
| Other race alone (NH) | 0 | 0 | 0.00% | 0.00% |
| Mixed race or Multiracial (NH) | 3 | 9 | 1.43% | 4.33% |
| Hispanic or Latino (any race) | 6 | 15 | 2.86% | 7.21% |
| Total | 210 | 208 | 100.00% | 100.00% |

=== 2010 census ===
As of the census of 2010, there were 210 people, 81 households, and 62 families residing in the CDP. The population density was 755.4 people per square mile (291.7 people/km^{2}). There were 88 housing units at an average density of 316.5 per square mile (122.2/km^{2}). The racial makeup of the CDP was 95.7% White, 0.0% African American, 2.9% Native American, 0.0% Asian, 0.0% Pacific Islander, 0.0% from other races, and 1.4% from two or more races. Hispanic or Latino of any race were 2.9% of the population.

There were 81 households, out of which 32.1% had children under the age of 18 living with them, 65.4% were married couples living together, 7.4% had a female householder with no husband present, and 23.5% were non-families. 19.8% of all households were made up of individuals, and 27.2% had someone living alone who was 65 years of age or older. The average household size was 2.59 and the average family size was 2.90.

In the CDP, the age distribution of the population shows 24.3% under the age of 18, 5.2% from 18 to 24, 19.0% from 25 to 44, 39.0% from 45 to 64, and 12.4% who were 65 years of age or older. The median age was 45.5 years. For every 100 females, there were 92.7 males. For every 100 females age 18 and over, there were 96.3 males.
