= Andrew B. Hammond =

American lumberman (1848–1934)

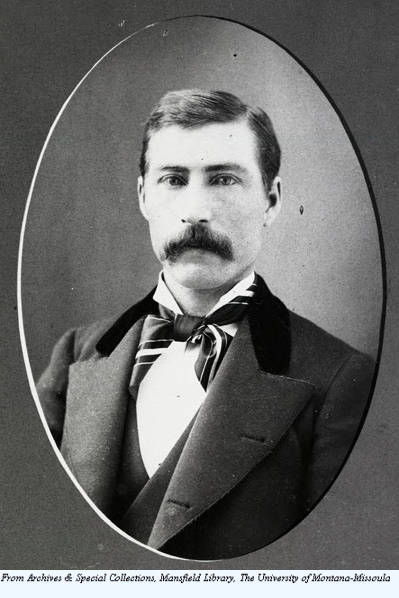
- Born: Andrew Benoni Hammond; July 22, 1848; Saint-Léonard, New Brunswick
- Died: January 15, 1934 (aged 85); San Francisco, California
- Occupation: entrepreneur
- Known for: Founder of the Missoula Mercantile Co. and Hammond Lumber Company
- Spouse: Florence Abbott

Andrew Benoni Hammond (July 22, 1848 – January 15, 1934) was an American lumberman. He developed the Missoula Mercantile Co. He built the Bitterroot Valley Railroad and the Astoria & Columbia River Railroad. He was president of the Hammond Lumber Co. and the Hammond Steamship Co.

== Biography ==
Hammond was born in Saint-Léonard, New Brunswick, Canada on July 22, 1848. He left home at 16 years old to work in the logging camps of Maine and Pennsylvania. He arrived in Montana in 1867, worked as a woodcutter and store clerk, eventually becoming a partner in the mercantile firm of Bonner, Eddy and Company. Under Hammond's management this became the Missoula Mercantile Company, the largest mercantile between St. Paul and Portland. Hammond Lumber Company was founded when Hammond purchased the Samoa sawmill, the largest mill in Humboldt County in 1900.

He built the Bitterroot Valley Railroad, the Philipburg Railroad, and the Astoria & Columbia River Railroad. He was president of the Hammond Lumber Co. and the Hammond Steamship Co.

Hammond and his partners received the contract to build the intermountain section of the Northern Pacific railway line, from Helena to Spokane. In the 1890s, Hammond moved to the West Coast and built two more railroads. In 1900, he began to assemble one of the largest lumber companies on the West Coast, including the world's largest redwood lumber company and the world's largest lumber yard in Los Angeles.

During World War I, Hammond was the largest supplier of Sitka spruce wood to the U.S. Army, which needed it to manufacture airplanes.

Hammond is most known for his role in the poaching of federal timber during his years in Montana, and his anti-union efforts during the early twentieth century. Ironically, much of the Hammond Lumber Company lands that were illegally acquired under the federal Timber and Stone Act in Humboldt County eventually formed the bulk of Redwood National and State Parks.

In 1956, Hammond's heirs sold the company's California stakes to Georgia-Pacific.

== Death and legacy ==
Hammond died on January 15, 1934, in San Francisco, California, at age 85.

He married Florence Abbott in 1879, in Missoula. They had a son, Leonard C. Hammond., who was a flying ace in World War I.

The community of Hammond, Oregon was named for him, and his wife gave her name to Florence, Montana.

SS A. B. Hammond a liberty ship built by California Shipbuilding Corporation of Los Angeles, is named after him.

== Hammond Shipping Company ==
Hammond opened the Hammond Shipping Company with ships to transport his lumber products. In 1929 the line was called the Christenson-Hammond Lines.

- Hammond Shipping Company wooden ships built at Hammond Lumber in Fairhaven, California built: (Hammond Lumber purchased the shipyard in 1910 and sold yard in 1919)
- Necanicum built in 1912 fate Scrapped 1939
- Mary Olson built in 1913 fate Burnt at Cienfuegos in 1919
- Santiam built in 1916 fate Burnt at Aberdeen in 1936
- Flavel built in 1917 fate Wrecked off Carmel in 1923
- Trinidad built in 1918 fate Wrecked off Willapa in 1937
- Halco built in 1918 fate Wrecked off Grays Harbor in 1925

=== World War II ===
During World War II Hammond Shipping Company was active in charter shipping with the Maritime Commission and War Shipping Administration. The ship was run by its Hammond Shipping Company crew and the US Navy supplied United States Navy Armed Guards to man the deck guns and radio. The most common armament mounted on these merchant ships were the MK II 20mm Oerlikon autocannon and the 3"/50, 4"/50, and 5"/38 deck guns.

  - Merchant navy ships:
- SS A. B. Hammond
- SS Alfred Victory
- SS Gretna Victory
- SS Grinnell Victory
- SS Marquette Victory
- SS Bessemer Victory
- SS American Victory, now a museum ship
- SS Walter Wyman
- SS Josiah Earl
- SS Robert G. Cousins
- SS Edward Bates, sank in 1944 after torpedo
- USAT Arcata, sank off Alaska by the Japanese submarine I-7.

== Companies ==
Hammond owned or had the controlling interest in:

- Missoula Mercantile, retail store
- Big Blackfoot Milling Co.
- Flour mill at Bonner
- Grain elevators in western Montana
- Missoula Real Estate Association, owners of Florence Hotel and the Hammond Block
- First National Bank of Montana
- South Missoula Land Company, residential homes on the Clark Fork River
- Missoula Water Works and Milling Company
- Missoula Street Railway Company, horse drawn cars
- Missoula Publishing Company owners of the Missoulian
- Missoula Valley Improvement Company, owners the local cemetery
- Hammond Shipping Company
- Hammond Lumber Company
