= 1976 Montana House of Representatives election =

- November 2, 1976

All 100 seats in the Montana House of Representatives 51 seats needed for a majority
	Majority party	Minority party
Leader	Pat McKittrick (retired)	Lloyd C. Lockrem Jr. (retired)
Party	Democratic	Republican
Leader's seat	42nd-Great Falls	64th-Billings
Last election	67	33
Seats after	57	43
Seat change	▼10	▲10
Speaker before election
Pat McKittrick
Democratic
Elected Speaker
John Brian Driscoll
Democratic

The 1976 Montana House of Representatives election took place on November 2, 1976, with the primary election held on June 1, 1976. Montana voters elected all 100 members of the Montana House of Representatives to serve two-year terms. The election coincided with United States national elections and Montana state elections, including U.S. President, U.S. Senate, U.S. House, Montana Governor and Montana Senate.

Following the previous election in 1974, Democrats held a 67-to-33-seat majority over Republicans. Democrats maintained their majority in the legislature with 57 seats, while Republicans were elected in 43 seats—giving Republicans a net gain of 10 seats. The newly elected members served in the 45th Montana State Legislature, during which Democrat John Brian Driscoll was elected Speaker of the Montana House.

== Retiring incumbents ==
=== Democrats ===
1. District 8: Steven N. Helmbrecht
2. District 23: Orin P. Kendall
3. District 25: James F. Fleming Jr.
4. District 32: Paul T. Richards
5. District 37: Dennis A. Lester
6. District 40: Bill Thomas
7. District 42: Pat McKittrick
8. District 61: Roberto M. Federico
9. District 83: Al Luebeck
10. District 88: Robert J. "Bob" Harper
11. District 97: Duane Johnson
12. District 100: Daniel Kemmis

=== Republicans ===
1. District 3: Dennis D. Casey
2. District 31: A. T. "Tom" Rasmussen
3. District 45: Elmer Schye
4. District 60: Tom Hager
5. District 64: Lloyd C. Lockrem Jr.
6. District 65: Wallace W. "Wally" Mercer
7. District 79: William E. "Bill" Asher
8. District 82: C. R. Anderson

== Incumbents defeated in primary election ==
=== Democrats ===
1. District 14: Gail M. Stoltz
2. District 17: James A. Sloan
3. District 24: Joseph M. Magone
4. District 39: Duane P. "Mac" McFadden
5. District 86: R. F. "Bob" Kelly

=== Republican ===
1. District 81: John H. Anderson Jr.

== Incumbents defeated in general election ==
=== Democrats ===
1. District 1: Glenn Jacobsen
2. District 4: Ernest L. Kummerfeldt
3. District 10: Fred Fishbaugh
4. District 18: James Moore
5. District 19: Bob Finley
6. District 20: William G. Gwynn
7. District 43: Geraldine W. Travis
8. District 47: John Murphy
9. District 71: Martha S. Herlevi
10. District 72: Alvin Hageman
11. District 74: Dan Yardley
12. District 92: Sam Wolfe

=== Republicans ===
1. District 30: Betty L. Babcock
2. District 52: Lee Hubing
3. District 66: A. B. Guthrie

== Summary of results ==
Italics denote an open seat held by the incumbent party; bold text denotes a gain for a party.

State house district	Incumbent	Party	Elected representative	Outcome
1	Glenn Jacobsen	Dem	**Dennis G. Nathe**	**Rep gain**
2	Art Lund	Rep	Art Lund	Rep hold
3	Dennis D. Casey	Rep	Orren C. Vinger	Rep hold
4	Ernest L. Kummerfeldt	Dem	**G. C. "Jerry" Feda**	**Rep gain**
5	Paul K. Kropp	Rep	Paul K. Kropp	Rep hold
6	Francis Bardanouve	Dem	Francis Bardanouve	Dem hold
7	Robert Sivertsen	Rep	Robert Sivertsen	Rep hold
8	Steven N. Helmbrecht	Dem	Edna A. Gunderson	Dem hold
9	David Aageson	Rep	David Aageson	Rep hold
10	Fred Fishbaugh	Dem	**Audrey Roth**	**Rep gain**
11	Rex Manuel	Dem	Rex Manuel	Dem hold
12	Melvin Underdal	Rep	Melvin Underdal	Rep hold
13	George R. Johnston	Dem	George R. Johnston	Dem hold
14	Gail M. Stoltz	Dem	Leo M. Kennerly Jr.	Dem hold
15	Russell Baeth	Dem	Russell Baeth	Dem hold
16	Ora J. Halvorson	Dem	Ora J. Halvorson	Dem hold
17	James A. Sloan	Dem	Jack Brian Uhde	Dem hold
18	James Moore	Dem	**Lee Tower**	**Rep gain**
19	Bob Finley	Dem	**Clyde A. Turner**	**Rep gain**
20	William G. Gwynn	Dem	**Aubyn A. Curtiss**	**Rep gain**
21	William R. "Bill" Baeth	Dem	William R. "Bill" Baeth	Dem hold
22	Arthur H. Shelden	Dem	Arthur H. Shelden	Dem hold
23	Orin P. Kendall	Dem	**Chris H. Stobie**	**Rep gain**
24	Joseph M. Magone	Dem	Harry Hansen	Dem hold
25	James F. Fleming Jr. (Note: Although incumbent James F. Fleming Jr. won the primary, Raymond K. Harbin was the Democratic nominee in the general election.)	Dem	**William Ray Jensen**	**Rep gain**
26	Carl A. Seifert	Rep	Carl A. Seifert	Rep hold
27	Verner L. Bertelsen	Rep	Verner L. Bertelsen	Rep hold
28	Joe Brand	Dem	Joe Brand	Dem hold
29	Peter M. "Mike" Meloy	Dem	Peter M. "Mike" Meloy	Dem hold
30	Betty L. Babcock	Rep	**Hal Harper**	**Dem gain**
31	A. T. "Tom" Rasmussen	Rep	**Jerry Metcalf**	**Dem gain**
32	Paul T. Richards	Dem	JoEllen Estenson	Dem hold
33	John B. Staigmiller	Dem	John B. Staigmiller	Dem hold
34	Helen G. O'Connell	Dem	Helen G. O'Connell	Dem hold
35	Jack Gunderson	Dem	Jack Gunderson	Dem hold
36	Joe Tropila	Dem	Joe Tropila	Dem hold
37	Dennis A. Lester	Dem	Patrick L. Ryan	Dem hold
38	Peter J. Gilligan Jr.	Dem	Peter J. Gilligan Jr.	Dem hold
39	Duane P. "Mac" McFadden	Dem	Paul G. Pistoria	Dem hold
40	Bill Thomas	Dem	John F. Kenny	Dem hold
41	Jack K. Moore	Rep	Jack K. Moore	Rep hold
42	Pat McKittrick	Dem	**Darryl Meyer**	**Rep gain**
43	Geraldine W. Travis	Dem	**Warren O'Keefe**	**Rep gain**
44	W. Jay Fabrega	Rep	W. Jay Fabrega	Rep hold
45	Elmer Schye	Rep	Burt Hurwitz	Rep hold
46	Hershel M. Robbins	Dem	Hershel M. Robbins	Dem hold
47	John Murphy	Dem	**Gene N. Ernst**	**Rep gain**
48	Fred O. Barrett	Rep	Fred O. Barrett	Rep hold
49	Edward Lien	Dem	Edward Lien	Dem hold
50	E. N. Dassinger	Dem	E. N. Dassinger	Dem hold
51	Carroll V. South	Dem	Carroll V. South	Dem hold
52	Lee Hubing	Rep	**Les J. Hirsch**	**Dem gain**
53	Oscar S. Kvaalen	Rep	Oscar S. Kvaalen	Rep hold
54	William M. "Willie" Day	Dem	William M. "Willie" Day	Dem hold
55	L. E. "Gene" Wood	Rep	L. E. "Gene" Wood	Rep hold
56	Harold A. Wyrick	Rep	Harold A. Wyrick	Rep hold
57	Carl M. Smith	Rep	Carl M. Smith	Rep hold
58	Thomas R. Conroy	Dem	Thomas R. Conroy	Dem hold
59	Esther G. Bengtson	Dem	Esther G. Bengtson	Dem hold
60	Tom Hager	Rep	**Eugene F. Frates**	**Dem gain**
61	Roberto M. Federico	Dem	Gary L. Colburn	Dem hold
62	Harold E. Gerke	Dem	Harold E. Gerke	Dem hold
63	Harrison G. Fagg	Rep	Harrison G. Fagg	Rep hold
64	Lloyd C. Lockrem Jr.	Rep	Jack Ramirez	Rep hold
65	Wallace W. "Wally" Mercer	Rep	Howard C. Porter	Rep hold
66	A. B. Guthrie	Rep	**Gerald R. Kessler**	**Dem gain**
67	Polly Holmes	Dem	Polly Holmes	Dem hold
68	Herb Huennekens	Dem	Herb Huennekens	Dem hold
69	Wes Teague	Dem	Wes Teague	Dem hold
70	J. Melvin Williams	Dem	J. Melvin Williams	Dem hold
71	Martha S. Herlevi	Dem	**James H. "Jim" Burnett**	**Rep gain**
72	Alvin Hageman	Dem	**V. Jean McLane**	**Rep gain**
73	Orval S. Ellison	Rep	Orval S. Ellison	Rep hold
74	Dan Yardley	Dem	**Edith E. Cox**	**Rep gain**
75	Robert A. Ellerd	Rep	Robert A. Ellerd	Rep hold
76	John P. Scully	Dem	John P. Scully	Dem hold
77	Dorothy M. Bradley	Dem	Dorothy M. Bradley	Dem hold
78	John Vincent	Dem	John Vincent	Dem hold
79	William E. "Bill" Asher	Rep	Dale H. Davis	Rep hold
80	Robert L. "Bob" Marks	Rep	Robert L. "Bob" Marks	Rep hold
81	John H. Anderson Jr.	Rep	Kerry R. Keyser	Rep hold
82	C. R. Anderson	Rep	**William M. Hand**	**Dem gain**
83	Al Luebeck	Dem	Mike Cooney	Dem hold
84	Joe Quilici	Dem	Joe Quilici	Dem hold
85	James T. Mular	Dem	James T. Mular	Dem hold
86	R. F. "Bob" Kelly	Dem	Jim Courtney	Dem hold
87	John "J.D." Lynch	Dem	John "J.D." Lynch	Dem hold
88	Robert J. "Bob" Harper	Dem	Dan W. Harrington	Dem hold
89	Joe F. Kanduch Sr.	Dem	Joe F. Kanduch Sr.	Dem hold
90	William "Red" Menahan	Dem	William "Red" Menahan	Dem hold
91	John Brian Driscoll	Dem	John Brian Driscoll	Dem hold
92	Sam Wolfe	Dem	**Elmer D. Severson**	**Rep gain**
93	Howard L. Ellis	Rep	Howard L. Ellis	Rep hold
94	Gary Niles Kimble	Dem	Gary Niles Kimble	Dem hold
95	Ann Mary Dussault	Dem	Ann Mary Dussault	Dem hold
96	Bob Palmer	Dem	Bob Palmer	Dem hold
97	Duane Johnson	Dem	Steve Waldron	Dem hold
98	R. Budd Gould	Rep	R. Budd Gould	Rep hold
99	Earl C. Lory	Rep	Earl C. Lory	Rep hold
100	Daniel Kemmis	Dem	**Ralph S. Eudaily**	**Rep gain**

== Detailed results by district ==
=== District 1 ===
Democratic primary results
Party	Candidate	Votes	%
Democratic	Glenn Jacobsen (incumbent)	966	100.00%
Total votes		966	100.00%

Republican primary results
Party	Candidate	Votes	%
Republican	Dennis G. Nathe (Note: The candidate ran a write-in campaign in this election.)	287	100.00%
Total votes		287	100.00%

General election results
Party	Candidate	Votes	%
Republican	Dennis G. Nathe	1,712	51.41%
Democratic	Glenn Jacobsen (incumbent)	1,618	48.59%
Total votes		3,330	100.00%
Republican gain from Democratic			

=== District 2 ===
Republican primary results
Party	Candidate	Votes	%
Republican	Art Lund (incumbent)	707	100.00%
Total votes		707	100.00%

General election results
Party	Candidate	Votes	%
Republican	Art Lund (incumbent)	2,228	100.00%
Total votes		2,228	100.00%
Republican hold			

=== District 3 ===
Democratic primary results
Party	Candidate	Votes	%
Democratic	Raymond Randolph	639	100.00%
Total votes		639	100.00%

Republican primary results
Party	Candidate	Votes	%
Republican	Orren C. Vinger	640	100.00%
Total votes		640	100.00%

General election results
Party	Candidate	Votes	%
Republican	Orren C. Vinger	1,641	55.01%
Democratic	Raymond Randolph	1,342	44.99%
Total votes		2,983	100.00%
Republican hold			

=== District 4 ===
Democratic primary results
Party	Candidate	Votes	%
Democratic	Ernest L. Kummerfeldt (incumbent)	505	51.37%
Democratic	William R. "Bill" Beede	478	48.63%
Total votes		983	100.00%

Republican primary results
Party	Candidate	Votes	%
Republican	G. C. "Jerry" Feda	608	100.00%
Total votes		608	100.00%

General election results
Party	Candidate	Votes	%
Republican	G. C. "Jerry" Feda	1,604	52.92%
Democratic	Ernest L. Kummerfeldt (incumbent)	1,427	47.08%
Total votes		3,031	100.00%
Republican gain from Democratic			

=== District 5 ===
Democratic primary results
Party	Candidate	Votes	%
Democratic	Ric Floren	705	100.00%
Total votes		705	100.00%

Republican primary results
Party	Candidate	Votes	%
Republican	Paul K. Kropp (incumbent)	892	100.00%
Total votes		892	100.00%

General election results
Party	Candidate	Votes	%
Republican	Paul K. Kropp (incumbent)	1,900	58.91%
Democratic	Ric Floren	1,325	41.09%
Total votes		3,225	100.00%
Republican hold			

=== District 6 ===
Democratic primary results
Party	Candidate	Votes	%
Democratic	Francis Bardanouve (incumbent)	905	100.00%
Total votes		905	100.00%

General election results
Party	Candidate	Votes	%
Democratic	Francis Bardanouve (incumbent)	2,326	100.00%
Total votes		2,326	100.00%
Democratic hold			

=== District 7 ===
Democratic primary results
Party	Candidate	Votes	%
Democratic	Raymond G. Watson	806	100.00%
Total votes		806	100.00%

Republican primary results
Party	Candidate	Votes	%
Republican	Robert Sivertsen (incumbent)	609	100.00%
Total votes		609	100.00%

General election results
Party	Candidate	Votes	%
Republican	Robert Sivertsen (incumbent)	1,705	59.97%
Democratic	Raymond G. Watson	1,138	40.03%
Total votes		2,843	100.00%
Republican hold			

=== District 8 ===
Democratic primary results
Party	Candidate	Votes	%
Democratic	Edna A. Gunderson	599	59.60%
Democratic	Charles F. Grant	216	21.49%
Democratic	Sean T. Mathews	190	18.91%
Total votes		1,005	100.00%

Republican primary results
Party	Candidate	Votes	%
Republican	Ralph H. Patrick	437	100.00%
Total votes		437	100.00%

General election results
Party	Candidate	Votes	%
Democratic	Edna A. Gunderson	1,424	51.33%
Republican	Ralph H. Patrick	1,350	48.67%
Total votes		2,774	100.00%
Democratic hold			

=== District 9 ===
Democratic primary results
Party	Candidate	Votes	%
Democratic	Walter Laas	966	100.00%
Total votes		966	100.00%

Republican primary results
Party	Candidate	Votes	%
Republican	David Aageson (incumbent)	832	100.00%
Total votes		832	100.00%

General election results
Party	Candidate	Votes	%
Republican	David Aageson (incumbent)	1,941	64.85%
Democratic	Walter Laas	1,052	35.15%
Total votes		2,993	100.00%
Republican hold			

=== District 10 ===
Democratic primary results
Party	Candidate	Votes	%
Democratic	Fred Fishbaugh (incumbent)	1,016	100.00%
Total votes		1,016	100.00%

Republican primary results
Party	Candidate	Votes	%
Republican	Audrey Roth	219	100.00%
Total votes		219	100.00%

General election results
Party	Candidate	Votes	%
Republican	Audrey Roth	1,774	50.86%
Democratic	Fred Fishbaugh (incumbent)	1,714	49.14%
Total votes		3,488	100.00%
Republican gain from Democratic			

=== District 11 ===
Democratic primary results
Party	Candidate	Votes	%
Democratic	Rex Manuel (incumbent)	1,234	100.00%
Total votes		1,234	100.00%

Republican primary results
Party	Candidate	Votes	%
Republican	Gwen Larson	949	100.00%
Total votes		949	100.00%

General election results
Party	Candidate	Votes	%
Democratic	Rex Manuel (incumbent)	2,234	56.69%
Republican	Gwen Larson	1,707	43.31%
Total votes		3,941	100.00%
Democratic hold			

=== District 12 ===
Democratic primary results
Party	Candidate	Votes	%
Democratic	Earl C. Keister	787	100.00%
Total votes		787	100.00%

Republican primary results
Party	Candidate	Votes	%
Republican	Melvin Underdal (incumbent)	984	100.00%
Total votes		984	100.00%

General election results
Party	Candidate	Votes	%
Republican	Melvin Underdal (incumbent)	2,156	63.81%
Democratic	Earl C. Keister	1,223	36.19%
Total votes		3,379	100.00%
Republican hold			

=== District 13 ===
Democratic primary results
Party	Candidate	Votes	%
Democratic	George R. Johnston (incumbent)	649	100.00%
Total votes		649	100.00%

General election results
Party	Candidate	Votes	%
Democratic	George R. Johnston (incumbent)	2,366	100.00%
Total votes		2,366	100.00%
Democratic hold			

=== District 14 ===
Democratic primary results
Party	Candidate	Votes	%
Democratic	Leo M. Kennerly Jr.	537	51.29%
Democratic	Gail M. Stoltz (incumbent)	352	33.62%
Democratic	Geraldine Wells Gordon	158	15.09%
Total votes		1,047	100.00%

Republican primary results
Party	Candidate	Votes	%
Republican	J. W. "Bill" Rappold	390	76.77%
Republican	Martina Arnoux	118	23.23%
Total votes		508	100.00%

General election results
Party	Candidate	Votes	%
Democratic	Leo M. Kennerly Jr.	1,265	54.55%
Republican	J. W. "Bill" Rappold	1,054	45.45%
Total votes		2,319	100.00%
Democratic hold			

=== District 15 ===
Democratic primary results
Party	Candidate	Votes	%
Democratic	Russell Baeth (incumbent)	817	100.00%
Total votes		817	100.00%

General election results
Party	Candidate	Votes	%
Democratic	Russell Baeth (incumbent)	2,388	100.00%
Total votes		2,388	100.00%
Democratic hold			

=== District 16 ===
Democratic primary results
Party	Candidate	Votes	%
Democratic	Ora J. "Mrs. Stan" Halvorson (incumbent)	793	100.00%
Total votes		793	100.00%

Republican primary results
Party	Candidate	Votes	%
Republican	Betty Norem	769	100.00%
Total votes		769	100.00%

General election results
Party	Candidate	Votes	%
Democratic	Ora J. "Mrs. Stan" Halvorson (incumbent)	2,037	55.41%
Republican	Betty Norem	1,639	44.59%
Total votes		3,676	100.00%
Democratic hold			

=== District 17 ===
Democratic primary results
Party	Candidate	Votes	%
Democratic	Jack Brian Uhde	497	55.47%
Democratic	James A. Sloan (incumbent)	399	44.53%
Total votes		896	100.00%

Republican primary results
Party	Candidate	Votes	%
Republican	Tom L. Jones	567	64.14%
Republican	Emery E. Wittlake	317	35.86%
Total votes		884	100.00%

General election results
Party	Candidate	Votes	%
Democratic	Jack Brian Uhde	1,937	56.37%
Republican	Tom L. Jones	1,499	43.63%
Total votes		3,436	100.00%
Democratic hold			

=== District 18 ===
Democratic primary results
Party	Candidate	Votes	%
Democratic	James Moore (incumbent)	723	100.00%
Total votes		723	100.00%

Republican primary results
Party	Candidate	Votes	%
Republican	Lee Tower	929	100.00%
Total votes		929	100.00%

General election results
Party	Candidate	Votes	%
Republican	Lee Tower	1,896	51.38%
Democratic	James Moore (incumbent)	1,794	48.62%
Total votes		3,690	100.00%
Republican gain from Democratic			

=== District 19 ===
Democratic primary results
Party	Candidate	Votes	%
Democratic	Bob Finley (incumbent)	897	100.00%
Total votes		897	100.00%

Republican primary results
Party	Candidate	Votes	%
Republican	Clyde A. Turner	683	100.00%
Total votes		683	100.00%

General election results
Party	Candidate	Votes	%
Republican	Clyde A. Turner	1,786	51.22%
Democratic	Bob Finley (incumbent)	1,701	48.78%
Total votes		3,487	100.00%
Republican gain from Democratic			

=== District 20 ===
Democratic primary results
Party	Candidate	Votes	%
Democratic	William G. Gwynn (incumbent)	633	74.56%
Democratic	Donald Barge	216	25.44%
Total votes		849	100.00%

Republican primary results
Party	Candidate	Votes	%
Republican	Aubyn A. Curtiss	412	68.10%
Republican	Bing Holling	193	31.90%
Total votes		605	100.00%

General election results
Party	Candidate	Votes	%
Republican	Aubyn A. Curtiss	1,418	51.47%
Democratic	William G. Gwynn (incumbent)	1,337	48.53%
Total votes		2,755	100.00%
Republican gain from Democratic			

=== District 21 ===
Democratic primary results
Party	Candidate	Votes	%
Democratic	William R. "Bill" Baeth (incumbent)	415	41.54%
Democratic	Herbert Edward Stout	338	33.83%
Democratic	Ellsworth "Rip" Collins	246	24.62%
Total votes		999	100.00%

General election results
Party	Candidate	Votes	%
Democratic	William R. "Bill" Baeth (incumbent)	2,030	100.00%
Total votes		2,030	100.00%
Democratic hold			

=== District 22 ===
Democratic primary results
Party	Candidate	Votes	%
Democratic	Arthur H. Shelden (incumbent)	533	58.51%
Democratic	Dorothy Geer	378	41.49%
Total votes		911	100.00%

General election results
Party	Candidate	Votes	%
Democratic	Arthur H. Shelden (incumbent)	1,930	100.00%
Total votes		1,930	100.00%
Democratic hold			

=== District 23 ===
Democratic primary results
Party	Candidate	Votes	%
Democratic	William E. Shull	581	57.58%
Democratic	Walter R. Martin	428	42.42%
Total votes		1,009	100.00%

Republican primary results
Party	Candidate	Votes	%
Republican	Chris H. Stobie	563	63.54%
Republican	Jack J. Nichols	323	36.46%
Total votes		886	100.00%

General election results
Party	Candidate	Votes	%
Republican	Chris H. Stobie	2,072	59.73%
Democratic	William E. Shull	1,397	40.27%
Total votes		3,469	100.00%
Republican gain from Democratic			

=== District 24 ===
Democratic primary results
Party	Candidate	Votes	%
Democratic	Harry Hansen	713	45.21%
Democratic	Joseph M. Magone (incumbent)	665	42.17%
Democratic	Victor D. Wright	199	12.62%
Total votes		1,577	100.00%

General election results
Party	Candidate	Votes	%
Democratic	Harry Hansen	2,560	100.00%
Total votes		2,560	100.00%
Democratic hold			

=== District 25 ===
Democratic primary results
Party	Candidate	Votes	%
Democratic	James F. Fleming Jr. (incumbent)	903	100.00%
Total votes		903	100.00%

Republican primary results
Party	Candidate	Votes	%
Republican	William Ray Jensen	467	55.33%
Republican	W. D. McDaniel	377	44.67%
Total votes		844	100.00%

General election results
Party	Candidate	Votes	%
Republican	William Ray Jensen	1,650	50.23%
Democratic	Raymond K. Harbin	1,635	49.77%
Total votes		3,285	100.00%
Republican gain from Democratic			

=== District 26 ===
Democratic primary results
Party	Candidate	Votes	%
Democratic	Larry L. Robinson	469	64.25%
Democratic	Thomas A. Gray	261	35.75%
Total votes		730	100.00%

Republican primary results
Party	Candidate	Votes	%
Republican	Carl A. Seifert (incumbent)	872	58.96%
Republican	Gordon W. Livingston	607	41.04%
Total votes		1,479	100.00%

General election results
Party	Candidate	Votes	%
Republican	Carl A. Seifert (incumbent)	1,707	44.20%
Democratic	Larry L. Robinson	1,469	38.04%
Independent	Dale Bryson	686	17.76%
Total votes		3,862	100.00%
Republican hold			

=== District 27 ===
Democratic primary results
Party	Candidate	Votes	%
Democratic	George W. Thompson	870	100.00%
Total votes		870	100.00%

Republican primary results
Party	Candidate	Votes	%
Republican	Verner L. Bertelsen (incumbent)	1,009	100.00%
Total votes		1,009	100.00%

General election results
Party	Candidate	Votes	%
Republican	Verner L. Bertelsen (incumbent)	2,005	58.76%
Democratic	George W. Thompson	1,407	41.24%
Total votes		3,412	100.00%
Republican hold			

=== District 28 ===
Democratic primary results
Party	Candidate	Votes	%
Democratic	Joe Brand (incumbent)	935	100.00%
Total votes		935	100.00%

Republican primary results
Party	Candidate	Votes	%
Republican	Don Valiton	624	100.00%
Total votes		624	100.00%

General election results
Party	Candidate	Votes	%
Democratic	Joe Brand (incumbent)	1,574	57.89%
Republican	Don Valiton	1,145	42.11%
Total votes		2,719	100.00%
Democratic hold			

=== District 29 ===
Democratic primary results
Party	Candidate	Votes	%
Democratic	Peter M. "Mike" Meloy (incumbent)	793	60.21%
Democratic	Mike Morgan	524	39.79%
Total votes		1,317	100.00%

Republican primary results
Party	Candidate	Votes	%
Republican	John F. Bell	896	100.00%
Total votes		896	100.00%

General election results
Party	Candidate	Votes	%
Democratic	Peter M. "Mike" Meloy (incumbent)	2,296	53.83%
Republican	John F. Bell	1,969	46.17%
Total votes		4,265	100.00%
Democratic hold			

=== District 30 ===
Democratic primary results
Party	Candidate	Votes	%
Democratic	Hal Harper	777	69.44%
Democratic	Allen "Al" McCarthy	342	30.56%
Total votes		1,119	100.00%

Republican primary results
Party	Candidate	Votes	%
Republican	Betty L. Babcock (incumbent)	974	100.00%
Total votes		974	100.00%

General election results
Party	Candidate	Votes	%
Democratic	Hal Harper	2,164	54.74%
Republican	Betty L. Babcock (incumbent)	1,789	45.26%
Total votes		3,953	100.00%
Democratic gain from Republican			

=== District 31 ===
Democratic primary results
Party	Candidate	Votes	%
Democratic	Jerry Metcalf	730	100.00%
Total votes		730	100.00%

Republican primary results
Party	Candidate	Votes	%
Republican	Sheila M. Sullivan	413	57.76%
Republican	Dave Middlemas	302	42.24%
Total votes		715	100.00%

General election results
Party	Candidate	Votes	%
Democratic	Jerry Metcalf	1,679	57.46%
Republican	Sheila M. Sullivan	1,243	42.54%
Total votes		2,922	100.00%
Democratic gain from Republican			

=== District 32 ===
Democratic primary results
Party	Candidate	Votes	%
Democratic	JoEllen Estenson	297	25.26%
Democratic	William J. Orsello	255	21.68%
Democratic	Ken Myers	230	19.56%
Democratic	Hal Jacobson	221	18.79%
Democratic	Robert "Van" VanDerVere	173	14.71%
Total votes		1,176	100.00%

Republican primary results
Party	Candidate	Votes	%
Republican	Hugh P. McElwain	604	55.36%
Republican	Jean Miller	487	44.64%
Total votes		1,091	100.00%

General election results
Party	Candidate	Votes	%
Democratic	JoEllen Estenson	2,111	54.32%
Republican	Hugh P. McElwain	1,775	45.68%
Total votes		3,886	100.00%
Democratic hold			

=== District 33 ===
Democratic primary results
Party	Candidate	Votes	%
Democratic	John B. Staigmiller (incumbent)	816	100.00%
Total votes		816	100.00%

Republican primary results
Party	Candidate	Votes	%
Republican	Arthur W. Mills	637	100.00%
Total votes		637	100.00%

General election results
Party	Candidate	Votes	%
Democratic	John B. Staigmiller (incumbent)	1,535	53.73%
Republican	Arthur W. Mills	1,322	46.27%
Total votes		2,857	100.00%
Democratic hold			

=== District 34 ===
Democratic primary results
Party	Candidate	Votes	%
Democratic	Helen G. O'Connell (incumbent)	517	47.91%
Democratic	Gertrude Lindgren	298	27.62%
Democratic	Kim E. Schreiner	264	24.47%
Total votes		1,079	100.00%

Republican primary results
Party	Candidate	Votes	%
Republican	Glenn W. Decker	227	100.00%
Total votes		227	100.00%

General election results
Party	Candidate	Votes	%
Democratic	Helen G. O'Connell (incumbent)	1,603	65.59%
Republican	Glenn W. Decker	841	34.41%
Total votes		2,444	100.00%
Democratic hold			

=== District 35 ===
Democratic primary results
Party	Candidate	Votes	%
Democratic	Jack Gunderson (incumbent)	451	63.25%
Democratic	John Cefro	262	36.75%
Total votes		713	100.00%

Republican primary results
Party	Candidate	Votes	%
Republican	Bill Warren (Note: Although Bill Warren won the primary, Bob Dosser was the Republican nominee in the general election.)	290	100.00%
Total votes		290	100.00%

General election results
Party	Candidate	Votes	%
Democratic	Jack Gunderson (incumbent)	1,337	60.83%
Republican	Bob Dosser	861	39.17%
Total votes		2,198	100.00%
Democratic hold			

=== District 36 ===
Democratic primary results
Party	Candidate	Votes	%
Democratic	Joe Tropila (incumbent)	738	100.00%
Total votes		738	100.00%

Republican primary results
Party	Candidate	Votes	%
Republican	Jesse Allen O'Hara	420	100.00%
Total votes		420	100.00%

General election results
Party	Candidate	Votes	%
Democratic	Joe Tropila (incumbent)	1,369	52.07%
Republican	Jesse Allen O'Hara	1,260	47.93%
Total votes		2,629	100.00%
Democratic hold			

=== District 37 ===
Democratic primary results
Party	Candidate	Votes	%
Democratic	Patrick L. Ryan	337	46.74%
Democratic	Darryl Monroe Gray	183	25.38%
Democratic	Rick B. Lester	115	15.95%
Democratic	Ann Brown	86	11.93%
Total votes		721	100.00%

Republican primary results
Party	Candidate	Votes	%
Republican	Charles C. Carrico	145	58.47%
Republican	Dave Hantelman	103	41.53%
Total votes		248	100.00%

General election results
Party	Candidate	Votes	%
Democratic	Patrick L. Ryan	1,189	64.69%
Republican	Charles C. Carrico	649	35.31%
Total votes		1,838	100.00%
Democratic hold			

=== District 38 ===
Democratic primary results
Party	Candidate	Votes	%
Democratic	Peter J. Gilligan Jr. (incumbent)	654	100.00%
Total votes		654	100.00%

Republican primary results
Party	Candidate	Votes	%
Republican	Edward F. Anderson	288	100.00%
Total votes		288	100.00%

General election results
Party	Candidate	Votes	%
Democratic	Peter J. Gilligan Jr. (incumbent)	1,351	61.83%
Republican	Edward F. Anderson	834	38.17%
Total votes		2,185	100.00%
Democratic hold			

=== District 39 ===
Democratic primary results
Party	Candidate	Votes	%
Democratic	Paul G. Pistoria	362	40.27%
Democratic	Duane P. "Mac" McFadden (incumbent)	274	30.48%
Democratic	William C. Hodges	166	18.46%
Democratic	Charlie Miles	97	10.79%
Total votes		899	100.00%

Republican primary results
Party	Candidate	Votes	%
Republican	Channing J. Hartelius	281	100.00%
Total votes		281	100.00%

General election results
Party	Candidate	Votes	%
Democratic	Paul G. Pistoria	1,203	54.31%
Republican	Channing J. Hartelius	1,012	45.69%
Total votes		2,215	100.00%
Democratic hold			

=== District 40 ===
Democratic primary results
Party	Candidate	Votes	%
Democratic	John F. Kenny	684	100.00%
Total votes		684	100.00%

Republican primary results
Party	Candidate	Votes	%
Republican	Andrea "Andy" Hemstad	416	100.00%
Total votes		416	100.00%

General election results
Party	Candidate	Votes	%
Democratic	John F. Kenny	1,333	50.42%
Republican	Andrea "Andy" Hemstad	1,311	49.58%
Total votes		2,644	100.00%
Democratic hold			

=== District 41 ===
Democratic primary results
Party	Candidate	Votes	%
Democratic	Thomas F. O'Brien	499	59.26%
Democratic	Richard E. Manning	343	40.74%
Total votes		842	100.00%

Republican primary results
Party	Candidate	Votes	%
Republican	Jack K. Moore (incumbent)	657	100.00%
Total votes		657	100.00%

General election results
Party	Candidate	Votes	%
Republican	Jack K. Moore (incumbent)	1,551	54.59%
Democratic	Thomas F. O'Brien	1,290	45.41%
Total votes		2,841	100.00%
Republican hold			

=== District 42 ===
Democratic primary results
Party	Candidate	Votes	%
Democratic	Jacob D. Beck	493	100.00%
Total votes		493	100.00%

Republican primary results
Party	Candidate	Votes	%
Republican	Darryl Meyer	443	100.00%
Total votes		443	100.00%

General election results
Party	Candidate	Votes	%
Republican	Darryl Meyer	1,308	55.21%
Democratic	Jacob D. Beck	1,061	44.79%
Total votes		2,369	100.00%
Republican gain from Democratic			

=== District 43 ===
Democratic primary results
Party	Candidate	Votes	%
Democratic	Geraldine W. Travis (incumbent)	23	100.00%
Democratic	Philip Wayne Fite	0	0.00%
Total votes		23	100.00%

Republican primary results
Party	Candidate	Votes	%
Republican	Warren O'Keefe	9	100.00%
Total votes		9	100.00%

General election results
Party	Candidate	Votes	%
Republican	Warren O'Keefe	103	66.03%
Democratic	Geraldine W. Travis (incumbent)	53	33.97%
Total votes		156	100.00%
Republican gain from Democratic			

=== District 44 ===
Republican primary results
Party	Candidate	Votes	%
Republican	W. Jay Fabrega (incumbent)	616	100.00%
Total votes		616	100.00%

General election results
Party	Candidate	Votes	%
Republican	W. Jay Fabrega (incumbent)	1,826	100.00%
Total votes		1,826	100.00%
Republican hold			

=== District 45 ===
Democratic primary results
Party	Candidate	Votes	%
Democratic	William L. Skelton	405	44.12%
Democratic	Charles Mitchell	344	37.47%
Democratic	Jay Park	169	18.41%
Total votes		918	100.00%

Republican primary results
Party	Candidate	Votes	%
Republican	Burt Hurwitz	849	100.00%
Total votes		849	100.00%

General election results
Party	Candidate	Votes	%
Republican	Burt Hurwitz	1,601	52.37%
Democratic	William L. Skelton	1,456	47.63%
Total votes		3,057	100.00%
Republican hold			

=== District 46 ===
Democratic primary results
Party	Candidate	Votes	%
Democratic	Hershel M. Robbins (incumbent)	1,209	100.00%
Total votes		1,209	100.00%

Republican primary results
Party	Candidate	Votes	%
Republican	Robert E. Willems	879	100.00%
Total votes		879	100.00%

General election results
Party	Candidate	Votes	%
Democratic	Hershel M. Robbins (incumbent)	2,037	52.85%
Republican	Robert E. Willems	1,817	47.15%
Total votes		3,854	100.00%
Democratic hold			

=== District 47 ===
Democratic primary results
Party	Candidate	Votes	%
Democratic	John Murphy (incumbent)	975	100.00%
Total votes		975	100.00%

Republican primary results
Party	Candidate	Votes	%
Republican	Gene N. Ernst	889	58.10%
Republican	Duane "Red" Ridgeway	453	29.61%
Republican	Gerald R. Williams	188	12.29%
Total votes		1,530	100.00%

General election results
Party	Candidate	Votes	%
Republican	Gene N. Ernst	2,144	56.60%
Democratic	John Murphy (incumbent)	1,644	43.40%
Total votes		3,788	100.00%
Republican gain from Democratic			

=== District 48 ===
Democratic primary results
Party	Candidate	Votes	%
Democratic	Donn Pennell	744	100.00%
Total votes		744	100.00%

Republican primary results
Party	Candidate	Votes	%
Republican	Fred O. Barrett (incumbent)	1,099	100.00%
Total votes		1,099	100.00%

General election results
Party	Candidate	Votes	%
Republican	Fred O. Barrett (incumbent)	1,968	56.62%
Democratic	Donn Pennell	1,508	43.38%
Total votes		3,476	100.00%
Republican hold			

=== District 49 ===
Democratic primary results
Party	Candidate	Votes	%
Democratic	Edward Lien (incumbent)	925	100.00%
Total votes		925	100.00%

Republican primary results
Party	Candidate	Votes	%
Republican	Edwin Iverson	829	100.00%
Total votes		829	100.00%

General election results
Party	Candidate	Votes	%
Democratic	Edward Lien (incumbent)	1,626	50.40%
Republican	Edwin Iverson	1,600	49.60%
Total votes		3,226	100.00%
Democratic hold			

=== District 50 ===
Democratic primary results
Party	Candidate	Votes	%
Democratic	E. N. Dassinger (incumbent)	640	52.42%
Democratic	Arthur F. Hayes Sr.	581	47.58%
Total votes		1,221	100.00%

Republican primary results
Party	Candidate	Votes	%
Republican	George T. "Tom" Asay	635	100.00%
Total votes		635	100.00%

General election results
Party	Candidate	Votes	%
Democratic	E. N. Dassinger (incumbent)	1,591	45.03%
Republican	George T. "Tom" Asay	1,490	42.17%
Independent	Faye Hanson Christofferson	452	12.79%
Total votes		3,533	100.00%
Democratic hold			

=== District 51 ===
Democratic primary results
Party	Candidate	Votes	%
Democratic	Carroll V. South (incumbent)	834	100.00%
Total votes		834	100.00%

Republican primary results
Party	Candidate	Votes	%
Republican	Aubrey Larson	503	100.00%
Total votes		503	100.00%

General election results
Party	Candidate	Votes	%
Democratic	Carroll V. South (incumbent)	1,979	67.13%
Republican	Aubrey Larson	969	32.87%
Total votes		2,948	100.00%
Democratic hold			

=== District 52 ===
Democratic primary results
Party	Candidate	Votes	%
Democratic	Les J. Hirsch	784	100.00%
Total votes		784	100.00%

Republican primary results
Party	Candidate	Votes	%
Republican	Lee Hubing (incumbent)	1,076	100.00%
Total votes		1,076	100.00%

General election results
Party	Candidate	Votes	%
Democratic	Les J. Hirsch	1,918	52.46%
Republican	Lee Hubing (incumbent)	1,738	47.54%
Total votes		3,656	100.00%
Democratic gain from Republican			

=== District 53 ===
Democratic primary results
Party	Candidate	Votes	%
Democratic	Edward W. Agre	553	100.00%
Total votes		553	100.00%

Republican primary results
Party	Candidate	Votes	%
Republican	Oscar S. Kvaalen (incumbent)	917	100.00%
Total votes		917	100.00%

General election results
Party	Candidate	Votes	%
Republican	Oscar S. Kvaalen (incumbent)	1,748	59.60%
Democratic	Edward W. Agre	1,185	40.40%
Total votes		2,933	100.00%
Republican hold			

=== District 54 ===
Democratic primary results
Party	Candidate	Votes	%
Democratic	William M. "Willie" Day (incumbent)	955	100.00%
Total votes		955	100.00%

General election results
Party	Candidate	Votes	%
Democratic	William M. "Willie" Day (incumbent)	2,731	100.00%
Total votes		2,731	100.00%
Democratic hold			

=== District 55 ===
Democratic primary results
Party	Candidate	Votes	%
Democratic	A. A. Zody	706	100.00%
Total votes		706	100.00%

Republican primary results
Party	Candidate	Votes	%
Republican	L. E. "Gene" Wood (incumbent)	670	100.00%
Total votes		670	100.00%

General election results
Party	Candidate	Votes	%
Republican	L. E. "Gene" Wood (incumbent)	1,504	53.73%
Democratic	A. A. Zody	1,295	46.27%
Total votes		2,799	100.00%
Republican hold			

=== District 56 ===
Republican primary results
Party	Candidate	Votes	%
Republican	Harold A. Wyrick (incumbent)	690	84.04%
Republican	Marshall M. Shelden	131	15.96%
Total votes		821	100.00%

General election results
Party	Candidate	Votes	%
Republican	Harold A. Wyrick (incumbent)	2,321	100.00%
Total votes		2,321	100.00%
Republican hold			

=== District 57 ===
Republican primary results
Party	Candidate	Votes	%
Republican	Carl M. Smith (incumbent)	733	100.00%
Total votes		733	100.00%

General election results
Party	Candidate	Votes	%
Republican	Carl M. Smith (incumbent)	1,952	100.00%
Total votes		1,952	100.00%
Republican hold			

=== District 58 ===
Democratic primary results
Party	Candidate	Votes	%
Democratic	Thomas R. Conroy (incumbent)	833	100.00%
Total votes		833	100.00%

General election results
Party	Candidate	Votes	%
Democratic	Thomas R. Conroy (incumbent)	1,970	76.36%
Independent	Dale Kindness	610	23.64%
Total votes		2,580	100.00%
Democratic hold			

=== District 59 ===
Democratic primary results
Party	Candidate	Votes	%
Democratic	Esther G. Bengtson (incumbent)	619	65.36%
Democratic	Steve Trenka	328	34.64%
Total votes		947	100.00%

Republican primary results
Party	Candidate	Votes	%
Republican	Michael D. Brockie	470	100.00%
Total votes		470	100.00%

General election results
Party	Candidate	Votes	%
Democratic	Esther G. Bengtson (incumbent)	1,934	56.78%
Republican	Michael D. Brockie	1,472	43.22%
Total votes		3,406	100.00%
Democratic hold			

=== District 60 ===
Democratic primary results
Party	Candidate	Votes	%
Democratic	Eugene F. Frates	445	56.47%
Democratic	Martin B. Kitzman	343	43.53%
Total votes		788	100.00%

Republican primary results
Party	Candidate	Votes	%
Republican	Michael R. Atraqchi	472	100.00%
Total votes		472	100.00%

General election results
Party	Candidate	Votes	%
Democratic	Eugene F. Frates	2,035	51.86%
Republican	Michael R. Atraqchi	1,889	48.14%
Total votes		3,924	100.00%
Democratic gain from Republican			

=== District 61 ===
Democratic primary results
Party	Candidate	Votes	%
Democratic	Gary L. Colburn	312	39.29%
Democratic	Edward M. Dobson	259	32.62%
Democratic	Cornelius J. "Con" Riedl	223	28.09%
Total votes		794	100.00%

Republican primary results
Party	Candidate	Votes	%
Republican	John B. Fine	297	100.00%
Total votes		297	100.00%

General election results
Party	Candidate	Votes	%
Democratic	Gary L. Colburn	1,079	53.52%
Republican	John B. Fine	937	46.48%
Total votes		2,016	100.00%
Democratic hold			

=== District 62 ===
Democratic primary results
Party	Candidate	Votes	%
Democratic	Harold E. Gerke (incumbent)	399	65.73%
Democratic	Chet Lind	208	34.27%
Total votes		607	100.00%

Republican primary results
Party	Candidate	Votes	%
Republican	Robert E. Glennen	341	52.95%
Republican	Frank A. Salsbury	303	47.05%
Total votes		644	100.00%

General election results
Party	Candidate	Votes	%
Democratic	Harold E. Gerke (incumbent)	1,246	54.27%
Republican	Robert E. Glennen	1,050	45.73%
Total votes		2,296	100.00%
Democratic hold			

=== District 63 ===
Republican primary results
Party	Candidate	Votes	%
Republican	Harrison G. Fagg (incumbent)	941	100.00%
Total votes		941	100.00%

General election results
Party	Candidate	Votes	%
Republican	Harrison G. Fagg (incumbent)	2,338	100.00%
Total votes		2,338	100.00%
Republican hold			

=== District 64 ===
Republican primary results
Party	Candidate	Votes	%
Republican	Jack Ramirez	1,379	66.91%
Republican	Ralph J. Studer Jr.	682	33.09%
Total votes		2,061	100.00%

General election results
Party	Candidate	Votes	%
Republican	Jack Ramirez	3,754	100.00%
Total votes		3,754	100.00%
Republican hold			

=== District 65 ===
Democratic primary results
Party	Candidate	Votes	%
Democratic	Jim Hayfield	606	77.49%
Democratic	Eugene F. Herman	176	22.51%
Total votes		782	100.00%

Republican primary results
Party	Candidate	Votes	%
Republican	Howard C. Porter	1,073	100.00%
Total votes		1,073	100.00%

General election results
Party	Candidate	Votes	%
Republican	Howard C. Porter	2,087	57.02%
Democratic	Jim Hayfield	1,573	42.98%
Total votes		3,660	100.00%
Republican hold			

=== District 66 ===
Democratic primary results
Party	Candidate	Votes	%
Democratic	Gerald R. Kessler	404	55.49%
Democratic	Paul Van Tricht	324	44.51%
Total votes		728	100.00%

Republican primary results
Party	Candidate	Votes	%
Republican	A. B. Guthrie (incumbent)	718	100.00%
Total votes		718	100.00%

General election results
Party	Candidate	Votes	%
Democratic	Gerald R. Kessler	1,625	51.10%
Republican	A. B. Guthrie (incumbent)	1,555	48.90%
Total votes		3,180	100.00%
Democratic gain from Republican			

=== District 67 ===
Democratic primary results
Party	Candidate	Votes	%
Democratic	Polly Holmes (incumbent)	507	57.61%
Democratic	Neal C. Kirkness	373	42.39%
Total votes		880	100.00%

Republican primary results
Party	Candidate	Votes	%
Republican	Karen W. Whithorn	363	64.71%
Republican	Matilda "Tillie" Pierce	198	35.29%
Total votes		561	100.00%

General election results
Party	Candidate	Votes	%
Democratic	Polly Holmes (incumbent)	1,776	56.43%
Republican	Karen W. Whithorn	1,371	43.57%
Total votes		3,147	100.00%
Democratic hold			

=== District 68 ===
Democratic primary results
Party	Candidate	Votes	%
Democratic	Herb Huennekens (incumbent)	741	100.00%
Total votes		741	100.00%

Republican primary results
Party	Candidate	Votes	%
Republican	Henry S. "Hank" Cox	688	100.00%
Total votes		688	100.00%

General election results
Party	Candidate	Votes	%
Democratic	Herb Huennekens (incumbent)	1,436	44.86%
Republican	Henry S. "Hank" Cox	1,404	43.86%
Independent	C. C. Custer	361	11.28%
Total votes		3,201	100.00%
Democratic hold			

=== District 69 ===
Democratic primary results
Party	Candidate	Votes	%
Democratic	Wes Teague (incumbent)	511	100.00%
Total votes		511	100.00%

Republican primary results
Party	Candidate	Votes	%
Republican	Stella A. Ziegler	176	53.17%
Republican	Eldon L. Piper	155	46.83%
Total votes		331	100.00%

General election results
Party	Candidate	Votes	%
Democratic	Wes Teague (incumbent)	1,308	58.50%
Republican	Stella A. Ziegler	928	41.50%
Total votes		2,236	100.00%
Democratic hold			

=== District 70 ===
Democratic primary results
Party	Candidate	Votes	%
Democratic	J. Melvin Williams (incumbent)	580	54.00%
Democratic	Thomas E. Frickel	494	46.00%
Total votes		1,074	100.00%

Republican primary results
Party	Candidate	Votes	%
Republican	Kenneth G. Hageman	442	72.82%
Republican	Otto J. Preikszas	165	27.18%
Total votes		607	100.00%

General election results
Party	Candidate	Votes	%
Democratic	J. Melvin Williams (incumbent)	1,765	52.16%
Republican	Kenneth G. Hageman	1,619	47.84%
Total votes		3,384	100.00%
Democratic hold			

=== District 71 ===
Democratic primary results
Party	Candidate	Votes	%
Democratic	Martha S. Herlevi (incumbent)	1,191	100.00%
Total votes		1,191	100.00%

Republican primary results
Party	Candidate	Votes	%
Republican	James H. "Jim" Burnett	1,024	100.00%
Total votes		1,024	100.00%

General election results
Party	Candidate	Votes	%
Republican	James H. "Jim" Burnett	1,765	44.54%
Democratic	Martha S. Herlevi (incumbent)	1,631	41.16%
Independent	Don Scanlin	567	14.31%
Total votes		3,963	100.00%
Republican gain from Democratic			

=== District 72 ===
Democratic primary results
Party	Candidate	Votes	%
Democratic	Alvin Hageman (incumbent)	827	100.00%
Total votes		827	100.00%

Republican primary results
Party	Candidate	Votes	%
Republican	V. Jean McLane	759	66.81%
Republican	Lee W. Adsit	377	33.19%
Total votes		1,136	100.00%

General election results
Party	Candidate	Votes	%
Republican	V. Jean McLane	1,935	51.74%
Democratic	Alvin Hageman (incumbent)	1,805	48.26%
Total votes		3,740	100.00%
Republican gain from Democratic			

=== District 73 ===
Republican primary results
Party	Candidate	Votes	%
Republican	Orval S. Ellison (incumbent)	1,403	100.00%
Total votes		1,403	100.00%

General election results
Party	Candidate	Votes	%
Republican	Orval S. Ellison (incumbent)	3,258	100.00%
Total votes		3,258	100.00%
Republican hold			

=== District 74 ===
Democratic primary results
Party	Candidate	Votes	%
Democratic	Dan Yardley (incumbent)	455	49.78%
Democratic	Bill M. Whitney	262	28.67%
Democratic	Charles F. Nemec	197	21.55%
Total votes		914	100.00%

Republican primary results
Party	Candidate	Votes	%
Republican	Edith E. Cox	367	41.75%
Republican	Dorothy Strong Bradley	305	34.70%
Republican	Daniel L. Gibson	207	23.55%
Total votes		879	100.00%

General election results
Party	Candidate	Votes	%
Republican	Edith E. Cox	1,731	51.46%
Democratic	Dan Yardley (incumbent)	1,633	48.54%
Total votes		3,364	100.00%
Republican gain from Democratic			

=== District 75 ===
Democratic primary results
Party	Candidate	Votes	%
Democratic	Donald R. Reichmuth	524	100.00%
Total votes		524	100.00%

Republican primary results
Party	Candidate	Votes	%
Republican	Robert A. Ellerd (incumbent)	1,153	100.00%
Total votes		1,153	100.00%

General election results
Party	Candidate	Votes	%
Republican	Robert A. Ellerd (incumbent)	2,091	48.49%
Democratic	Donald R. Reichmuth	1,222	28.34%
Independent	Douglas Rand	999	23.17%
Total votes		4,312	100.00%
Republican hold			

=== District 76 ===
Democratic primary results
Party	Candidate	Votes	%
Democratic	John P. Scully (incumbent)	510	100.00%
Total votes		510	100.00%

Republican primary results
Party	Candidate	Votes	%
Republican	Bruce C. Jacobsen	536	100.00%
Total votes		536	100.00%

General election results
Party	Candidate	Votes	%
Democratic	John P. Scully (incumbent)	1,971	60.15%
Republican	Bruce C. Jacobsen	1,306	39.85%
Total votes		3,277	100.00%
Democratic hold			

=== District 77 ===
Democratic primary results
Party	Candidate	Votes	%
Democratic	Dorothy M. Bradley (incumbent)	594	100.00%
Total votes		594	100.00%

Republican primary results
Party	Candidate	Votes	%
Republican	R. R. "Bud" Williamson	614	100.00%
Total votes		614	100.00%

General election results
Party	Candidate	Votes	%
Democratic	Dorothy M. Bradley (incumbent)	1,619	55.45%
Republican	R. R. "Bud" Williamson	1,301	44.55%
Total votes		2,920	100.00%
Democratic hold			

=== District 78 ===
Democratic primary results
Party	Candidate	Votes	%
Democratic	John Vincent (incumbent)	832	79.31%
Democratic	Torlief Aasheim	217	20.69%
Total votes		1,049	100.00%

Republican primary results
Party	Candidate	Votes	%
Republican	Charley Kyd	549	100.00%
Total votes		549	100.00%

General election results
Party	Candidate	Votes	%
Democratic	John Vincent (incumbent)	1,986	65.72%
Republican	Charley Kyd	1,036	34.28%
Total votes		3,022	100.00%
Democratic hold			

=== District 79 ===
Democratic primary results
Party	Candidate	Votes	%
Democratic	Mick McGuire	685	100.00%
Total votes		685	100.00%

Republican primary results
Party	Candidate	Votes	%
Republican	Dale H. Davis	836	100.00%
Total votes		836	100.00%

General election results
Party	Candidate	Votes	%
Republican	Dale H. Davis	2,070	59.83%
Democratic	Mick McGuire	1,390	40.17%
Total votes		3,460	100.00%
Republican hold			

=== District 80 ===
Democratic primary results
Party	Candidate	Votes	%
Democratic	Paul A. Bessler	786	64.59%
Democratic	Christopher Colvin	431	35.41%
Total votes		1,217	100.00%

Republican primary results
Party	Candidate	Votes	%
Republican	Robert L. "Bob" Marks (incumbent)	954	100.00%
Total votes		954	100.00%

General election results
Party	Candidate	Votes	%
Republican	Robert L. "Bob" Marks (incumbent)	2,095	52.94%
Democratic	Paul A. Bessler	1,862	47.06%
Total votes		3,957	100.00%
Republican hold			

=== District 81 ===
Republican primary results
Party	Candidate	Votes	%
Republican	Kerry R. Keyser	850	50.60%
Republican	John H. Anderson Jr. (incumbent)	830	49.40%
Total votes		1,680	100.00%

General election results
Party	Candidate	Votes	%
Republican	Kerry R. Keyser	2,804	100.00%
Total votes		2,804	100.00%
Republican hold			

=== District 82 ===
Democratic primary results
Party	Candidate	Votes	%
Democratic	William M. Hand	559	70.49%
Democratic	Tom Dooling	234	29.51%
Total votes		793	100.00%

Republican primary results
Party	Candidate	Votes	%
Republican	Ron W. Johnson	781	57.22%
Republican	Dan Carpita	584	42.78%
Total votes		1,365	100.00%

General election results
Party	Candidate	Votes	%
Democratic	William M. Hand	1,574	55.95%
Republican	Ron W. Johnson	1,239	44.05%
Total votes		2,813	100.00%
Democratic gain from Republican			

=== District 83 ===
Democratic primary results
Party	Candidate	Votes	%
Democratic	Mike Cooney	1,044	54.52%
Democratic	Larry F. Buckley	450	23.50%
Democratic	Joe Hughes	421	21.98%
Total votes		1,915	100.00%

General election results
Party	Candidate	Votes	%
Democratic	Mike Cooney	2,922	100.00%
Total votes		2,922	100.00%
Democratic hold			

=== District 84 ===
Democratic primary results
Party	Candidate	Votes	%
Democratic	Joe Quilici (incumbent)	1,050	76.25%
Democratic	Virgil L. Hills	327	23.75%
Total votes		1,377	100.00%

General election results
Party	Candidate	Votes	%
Democratic	Joe Quilici (incumbent)	2,266	100.00%
Total votes		2,266	100.00%
Democratic hold			

=== District 85 ===
Democratic primary results
Party	Candidate	Votes	%
Democratic	James T. Mular (incumbent)	768	58.09%
Democratic	Don Plessas Jr.	554	41.91%
Total votes		1,322	100.00%

General election results
Party	Candidate	Votes	%
Democratic	James T. Mular (incumbent)	2,305	100.00%
Total votes		2,305	100.00%
Democratic hold			

=== District 86 ===
Democratic primary results
Party	Candidate	Votes	%
Democratic	Jim Courtney	613	46.09%
Democratic	R. F. "Bob" Kelly (incumbent)	435	32.71%
Democratic	Francis "Frank" Wallace	282	21.20%
Total votes		1,330	100.00%

General election results
Party	Candidate	Votes	%
Democratic	Jim Courtney	1,960	100.00%
Total votes		1,960	100.00%
Democratic hold			

=== District 87 ===
Democratic primary results
Party	Candidate	Votes	%
Democratic	John "J.D." Lynch (incumbent)	931	65.15%
Democratic	Rulon Crosby	498	34.85%
Total votes		1,429	100.00%

General election results
Party	Candidate	Votes	%
Democratic	John "J.D." Lynch (incumbent)	1,629	55.03%
Independent	Tom Christie	1,331	44.97%
Total votes		2,960	100.00%
Democratic hold			

=== District 88 ===
Democratic primary results
Party	Candidate	Votes	%
Democratic	Dan W. Harrington	581	32.73%
Democratic	William "Bill" Neary	387	21.80%
Democratic	John W. Ries	383	21.58%
Democratic	Arnold E. "Arnie" Barnett	235	13.24%
Democratic	James A. "Calla" Shea	189	10.65%
Total votes		1,775	100.00%

General election results
Party	Candidate	Votes	%
Democratic	Dan W. Harrington	2,006	100.00%
Total votes		2,006	100.00%
Democratic hold			

=== District 89 ===
Democratic primary results
Party	Candidate	Votes	%
Democratic	Joe F. Kanduch Sr. (incumbent)	855	69.12%
Democratic	Oscar R. Siegle	382	30.88%
Total votes		1,237	100.00%

General election results
Party	Candidate	Votes	%
Democratic	Joe F. Kanduch Sr. (incumbent)	1,772	100.00%
Total votes		1,772	100.00%
Democratic hold			

=== District 90 ===
Democratic primary results
Party	Candidate	Votes	%
Democratic	William "Red" Menahan (incumbent)	1,301	70.40%
Democratic	Robert L. Bethke	547	29.60%
Total votes		1,848	100.00%

General election results
Party	Candidate	Votes	%
Democratic	William "Red" Menahan (incumbent)	2,530	100.00%
Total votes		2,530	100.00%
Democratic hold			

=== District 91 ===
Democratic primary results
Party	Candidate	Votes	%
Democratic	John Brian Driscoll (incumbent)	1,031	57.50%
Democratic	Frank Popiel	762	42.50%
Total votes		1,793	100.00%

Republican primary results
Party	Candidate	Votes	%
Republican	Marvin F. Bell	526	55.37%
Republican	Lee Nelson	219	23.05%
Republican	Frederick Joseph Hosko	205	21.58%
Total votes		950	100.00%

General election results
Party	Candidate	Votes	%
Democratic	John Brian Driscoll (incumbent)	2,542	60.64%
Republican	Marvin F. Bell	1,650	39.36%
Total votes		4,192	100.00%
Democratic hold			

=== District 92 ===
Democratic primary results
Party	Candidate	Votes	%
Democratic	Sam Wolfe (incumbent)	877	100.00%
Total votes		877	100.00%

Republican primary results
Party	Candidate	Votes	%
Republican	Elmer D. Severson	1,043	68.66%
Republican	C. Thornton Mann	476	31.34%
Total votes		1,519	100.00%

General election results
Party	Candidate	Votes	%
Republican	Elmer D. Severson	2,701	60.63%
Democratic	Sam Wolfe (incumbent)	1,754	39.37%
Total votes		4,455	100.00%
Republican gain from Democratic			

=== District 93 ===
Democratic primary results
Party	Candidate	Votes	%
Democratic	W. M. Schendel	1,080	100.00%
Total votes		1,080	100.00%

Republican primary results
Party	Candidate	Votes	%
Republican	Howard L. Ellis (incumbent)	883	100.00%
Total votes		883	100.00%

General election results
Party	Candidate	Votes	%
Republican	Howard L. Ellis (incumbent)	2,542	65.62%
Democratic	W. M. Schendel	1,332	34.38%
Total votes		3,874	100.00%
Republican hold			

=== District 94 ===
Democratic primary results
Party	Candidate	Votes	%
Democratic	Gary Niles Kimble (incumbent)	993	100.00%
Total votes		993	100.00%

Republican primary results
Party	Candidate	Votes	%
Republican	Chris Mullin	428	100.00%
Total votes		428	100.00%

General election results
Party	Candidate	Votes	%
Democratic	Gary Niles Kimble (incumbent)	2,161	71.87%
Republican	Chris Mullin	846	28.13%
Total votes		3,007	100.00%
Democratic hold			

=== District 95 ===
Democratic primary results
Party	Candidate	Votes	%
Democratic	Ann Mary Dussault (incumbent)	1,243	100.00%
Total votes		1,243	100.00%

General election results
Party	Candidate	Votes	%
Democratic	Ann Mary Dussault (incumbent)	3,042	100.00%
Total votes		3,042	100.00%
Democratic hold			

=== District 96 ===
Democratic primary results
Party	Candidate	Votes	%
Democratic	Bob Palmer (incumbent)	993	100.00%
Total votes		993	100.00%

Republican primary results
Party	Candidate	Votes	%
Republican	D. B. Kensmoe	401	100.00%
Total votes		401	100.00%

General election results
Party	Candidate	Votes	%
Democratic	Bob Palmer (incumbent)	2,225	75.37%
Republican	D. B. Kensmoe	727	24.63%
Total votes		2,952	100.00%
Democratic hold			

=== District 97 ===
Democratic primary results
Party	Candidate	Votes	%
Democratic	Steve Waldron	801	60.91%
Democratic	Alfred J. "Al" Sampson	514	39.09%
Total votes		1,315	100.00%

Republican primary results
Party	Candidate	Votes	%
Republican	Leroy F. Berven (Note: Although Leroy F. Berven won the primary, John S. Anderson was the Republican nominee in the general election.)	379	100.00%
Total votes		379	100.00%

General election results
Party	Candidate	Votes	%
Democratic	Steve Waldron	2,093	73.28%
Republican	John S. Anderson	763	26.72%
Total votes		2,856	100.00%
Democratic hold			

=== District 98 ===
Democratic primary results
Party	Candidate	Votes	%
Democratic	Maxine Lane	869	100.00%
Total votes		869	100.00%

Republican primary results
Party	Candidate	Votes	%
Republican	R. Budd Gould (incumbent)	756	100.00%
Total votes		756	100.00%

General election results
Party	Candidate	Votes	%
Republican	R. Budd Gould (incumbent)	2,106	65.57%
Democratic	Maxine Lane	1,106	34.43%
Total votes		3,212	100.00%
Republican hold			

=== District 99 ===
Democratic primary results
Party	Candidate	Votes	%
Democratic	William E. Fillner	1,001	100.00%
Total votes		1,001	100.00%

Republican primary results
Party	Candidate	Votes	%
Republican	Earl C. Lory (incumbent)	1,249	100.00%
Total votes		1,249	100.00%

General election results
Party	Candidate	Votes	%
Republican	Earl C. Lory (incumbent)	2,518	62.68%
Democratic	William E. Fillner	1,499	37.32%
Total votes		4,017	100.00%
Republican hold			

=== District 100 ===
Democratic primary results
Party	Candidate	Votes	%
Democratic	John Badgley	581	55.76%
Democratic	Paulette C. Ferguson	461	44.24%
Total votes		1,042	100.00%

Republican primary results
Party	Candidate	Votes	%
Republican	Ralph S. Eudaily	528	53.60%
Republican	Tom R. Hillier	457	46.40%
Total votes		985	100.00%

General election results
Party	Candidate	Votes	%
Republican	Ralph S. Eudaily	1,861	50.05%
Democratic	John Badgley	1,857	49.95%
Total votes		3,718	100.00%
Republican gain from Democratic			

== See also ==
- 1976 United States presidential election in Montana
- 1976 United States Senate election in Montana
- 1976 United States House of Representatives elections in Montana
- 1976 Montana gubernatorial election
- 1976 Montana Senate election
