= 1974 Montana House of Representatives election =

- November 5, 1974

All 100 seats in the Montana House of Representatives 51 seats needed for a majority
	Majority party	Minority party
Leader	Harold E. Gerke	Oscar S. Kvaalen
Party	Democratic	Republican
Leader's seat	62nd-Billings	53rd-Lambert
Last election	54	46
Seats after	67	33
Seat change	▲13	▼13
Speaker before election
Harold E. Gerke
Democratic
Elected Speaker
Pat McKittrick
Democratic

The 1974 Montana House of Representatives election took place on November 5, 1974, with the primary election held on June 4, 1974. Montana voters elected all 100 members of the Montana House of Representatives. Following the landmark Reynolds v. Sims (1964) US Supreme Court decision, every state had to redraw state electoral districts to be approximately equal in population. Before Reynolds, the Montana House consisted of 100 members from a mix of single- and multi-member districts. After the ruling, the Montana House had to shift to equally populated electoral districts. In 1972, the voters of Montana ratified the current Constitution of Montana, establishing the structure of the state house that is still used today: 100 representatives each elected from a single-member district. Since 1974, all Montana state representatives are elected in single-member districts in even-numbered years for two-year terms.

The election coincided with United States national elections and Montana state elections, including U.S. House and Montana Senate.

Following the previous election in 1972, Democrats held a 54-to-46-seat majority over Republicans. Democrats increased their majority in the legislature to 67 seats, while Republicans held 33—giving Democrats a net gain of 13 seats. The newly elected members served in the 44th Montana State Legislature, during which Democrat Pat McKittrick was elected Speaker of the Montana House.

== Retiring incumbents ==
=== Democrats ===
1. District 3: Robert C. Prevost
2. District 4: Orphey "Bud" Lien
3. District 5: Robert S. Cotton
4. District 8: Richard A. Colberg
5. District 8: Ann K. "Pat" Regan
6. District 8: Thomas E. Towe
7. District 13: Larry Fasbender
8. District 13: Michael T. "Mike" Greely
9. District 13: John C. Hall
10. District 13: Gorham E. Swanberg
11. District 16: William "Bill" Zimmer
12. District 18: Max S. Baucus
13. District 18: Bill Norman
14. District 18: Robert D. Watt
15. District 19: John "Sandy" Mehrens
16. District 20: John E. "Jack" Healy
17. District 20: Robert E. "Bob" Lee
18. District 21: James W. Flynn
19. District 23: Joe R. Roberts

=== Republicans ===
1. District 2: James P. Lucas
2. District 2: Walter J. Ulmer
3. District 3: S.A. Olson
4. District 6: Vic East
5. District 8: Henry S. "Hank" Cox
6. District 9: Jack E. Galt
7. District 11: Wallace O. Forsgren
8. District 11: Tom Rolfe
9. District 13: Jack E. Kessner
10. District 13: John F. Tierney
11. District 14: Allen C. Kolstad
12. District 16: Robert J. "Bob" Brown
13. District 18: A.L. "Bud" Ainsworth
14. District 18: George Turman

== Incumbents defeated in primary election ==
=== Democrats ===
1. District 11: Robert E. Stephens (Note: Redistricted from district 15 to 11, then lost re-nomination in the primary.)
2. District 39: William C. Hodges (Note: Redistricted from district 13 to 39, then lost re-nomination in the primary.)
3. District 88: Jerry V. Lombardi (Note: Redistricted from district 20 to 88, Democratic Representative Jerry V. Lombardi initially won re-nomination in the Democratic primary by two votes over fellow Democratic Representative Bob Harper. However, a judge later ruled the primary election invalid and the Montana Democratic Central Committee selected Bob Harper to be the party's general election nominee.)
4. District 90: Albert E. "Al" Kosena (Note: Redistricted from district 19 to 90, then lost re-nomination in the primary.)

=== Republicans ===
1. District 27: John F. Bell (Note: Redistricted from district 12 to 27, then lost re-nomination in the primary.)
2. District 30: Hal Harper (Note: Redistricted from district 12 to 30, then lost re-nomination in the primary.)
3. District 73: Bill Warfield (Note: Redistricted from district 11 to 73, then lost re-nomination in the primary.)
4. District 82: Tom Clemow (Note: Redistricted from district 21 to 82, then lost re-nomination in the primary.)

== Incumbents defeated in general election ==
=== Democrats ===
1. District 2: Wallace B. Edland (Note: Redistricted from district 4 to 2, then lost re-election.)
2. District 9: Walter Laas (Note: Redistricted from district 14 to 9, then lost re-election.)
3. District 31: Barbara K. Bennetts (Note: Redistricted from district 12 to 31, then lost re-election.)
4. District 53: Henry J. Schepens (Note: Redistricted from district 3 to 53, then lost re-election.)

=== Republicans ===
1. District 17: Tom L. Jones (Note: Republican Representative Matt Himsl resigned in Dec. 1972 in the middle of the term. Tom L. Jones (R) was appointed to fill the vacancy and took the oath of office on January 1, 1973.) (Note: Redistricted from district 16 to 17, then lost re-election.)
2. District 18: Conrad F. Lundgren (Note: Redistricted from district 16 to 18, then lost re-election.)
3. District 19: Clyde A. Turner (Note: Redistricted from district 16 to 19, then lost re-election.)
4. District 29: Ruth B. Castles (Note: Redistricted from district 12 to 29, then lost re-election.)
5. District 32: William C. "Bill" Campbell (Note: Redistricted from district 12 to 32, then lost re-election.)
6. District 36: Tom Selstad (Note: Redistricted from district 13 to 36, then lost re-election.)
7. District 40: Malcolm E. Holtz (Note: Redistricted from district 13 to 40, then lost re-election.)
8. District 47: J. O. "Boots" Asbjornson (Note: Redistricted from district 10 to 47, then lost re-election.)
9. District 58: John E. Walborn (Note: Redistricted from district 1 to 58, then lost re-election.)
10. District 67: Robert E. Glennen (Note: Redistricted from district 8 to 67, then lost re-election.)
11. District 71: James H. "Jim" Burnett (Note: Redistricted from district 7 to 71, then lost re-election.)
12. District 92: C. Thornton Mann (Note: Republican Representative Norris Nichols resigned in the middle of the term. C. Thornton Mann (R) was appointed to fill the vacancy and took the oath of office on January 7, 1974.) (Note: Redistricted from district 22 to 92, then lost re-election.)
13. District 98: Gary R. Marbut (Note: Redistricted from district 18 to 98, then lost re-election. Representative Marbut was elected as a Republican in 1972 but ran for re-election in 1974 as a Democrat.)
14. District 100: Tom Haines (Note: Redistricted from district 18 to 100, then lost re-election.)

== Summary of results ==
Italics denote an open seat held by the incumbent party; bold text denotes a gain for a party.

State house district	Incumbent	Party	Elected representative	Outcome
1	Carl M. Smith (Note: Redistricted from district 1 to 57.)	Rep	**Glenn E. Jacobsen** (Note: Redistricted from district 4 to 1.)	**Dem gain**
1	John E. Walborn	Rep	**Glenn E. Jacobsen**	**Dem gain**
2	James P. Lucas	Rep	**Art Lund** (Note: Redistricted from district 4 to 2.)	**Rep gain**
2	Walter J. Ulmer	Rep	**Art Lund**	**Rep gain**
3	Oscar S. Kvaalen (Note: Redistricted from district 3 to 53.)	Rep	**Dennis D. Casey**	**Rep gain**
3	S.A. Olson	Rep	**Dennis D. Casey**	**Rep gain**
3	Robert C. Prevost	Dem	**Dennis D. Casey**	**Rep gain**
3	Henry J. Schepens	Dem	**Dennis D. Casey**	**Rep gain**
4	Wallace B. Edland	Dem	Ernest L. Kummerfeldt	Dem hold
4	Glenn E. Jacobsen	Dem	Ernest L. Kummerfeldt	Dem hold
4	Art Lund	Rep	Ernest L. Kummerfeldt	Dem hold
4	Orphey "Bud" Lien	Dem	Ernest L. Kummerfeldt	Dem hold
5	Francis Bardanouve (Note: Redistricted from district 5 to 6.)	Dem	**Paul K. Kropp**	**Rep gain**
5	Robert S. Cotton	Dem	**Paul K. Kropp**	**Rep gain**
6	Vic East	Rep	**Francis Bardanouve**	**Dem gain**
6	Lee Hubing (Note: Redistricted from district 6 to 52.)	Rep	**Francis Bardanouve**	**Dem gain**
7	James H. "Jim" Burnett	Rep	**Robert Sivertsen**	**Rep gain**
7	Alvin Hageman (Note: Redistricted from district 7 to 72.)	Dem	**Robert Sivertsen**	**Rep gain**
8	Richard A. Colberg	Dem	Steven N. Helmbrecht	Dem hold
8	Henry S. "Hank" Cox	Rep	Steven N. Helmbrecht	Dem hold
8	Harrison G. Fagg (Note: Redistricted from district 8 to 63.)	Rep	Steven N. Helmbrecht	Dem hold
8	Harold E. Gerke (Note: Redistricted from district 8 to 62.)	Dem	Steven N. Helmbrecht	Dem hold
8	Robert E. Glennen	Rep	Steven N. Helmbrecht	Dem hold
8	Tom Hager (Note: Redistricted from district 8 to 60.)	Rep	Steven N. Helmbrecht	Dem hold
8	Polly Holmes (Note: Redistricted from district 8 to 67.)	Dem	Steven N. Helmbrecht	Dem hold
8	Herb Huennekens (Note: Redistricted from district 8 to 68.)	Dem	Steven N. Helmbrecht	Dem hold
8	Lloyd C. Lockrem Jr. (Note: Redistricted from district 8 to 64.)	Rep	Steven N. Helmbrecht	Dem hold
8	Wallace W. "Wally" Mercer (Note: Redistricted from district 8 to 65.)	Rep	Steven N. Helmbrecht	Dem hold
8	Ann K. "Pat" Regan	Dem	Steven N. Helmbrecht	Dem hold
8	Thomas E. Towe	Dem	Steven N. Helmbrecht	Dem hold
9	Jack E. Galt	Rep	**David "Dave" Aageson** (Note: Redistricted from district 14 to 9.)	**Rep gain**
9	Elmer Schye (Note: Redistricted from district 9 to 45.)	Rep	**David "Dave" Aageson**	**Rep gain**
10	J. O. "Boots" Asbjornson	Rep	**Fred Fishbaugh**	**Dem gain**
10	Fred O. Barrett (Note: Redistricted from district 10 to 48.)	Rep	**Fred Fishbaugh**	**Dem gain**
11	Dorothy M. Bradley (Note: Redistricted from district 11 to 77.)	Dem	Rex Manuel (Note: Redistricted from district 15 to 11.)	Dem hold
11	Robert A. Ellerd (Note: Redistricted from district 11 to 75.)	Rep	Rex Manuel	Dem hold
11	Wallace O. Forsgren	Rep	Rex Manuel	Dem hold
11	Tom Rolfe	Rep	Rex Manuel	Dem hold
11	Bill Warfield	Rep	Rex Manuel	Dem hold
11	Dan Yardley (Note: Redistricted from district 11 to 74.)	Dem	Rex Manuel	Dem hold
12	John F. Bell	Rep	**Melvin Underdal**	**Rep gain**
12	Barbara K. Bennetts	Dem	**Melvin Underdal**	**Rep gain**
12	William C. "Bill" Campbell	Rep	**Melvin Underdal**	**Rep gain**
12	Ruth B. Castles	Rep	**Melvin Underdal**	**Rep gain**
12	Hal Harper	Rep	**Melvin Underdal**	**Rep gain**
12	Robert L. "Bob" Marks (Note: Redistricted from district 12 to 80.)	Rep	**Melvin Underdal**	**Rep gain**
13	Larry Fasbender	Dem	George R. Johnston (Note: Redistricted from district 15 to 13.)	Dem hold
13	Michael T. "Mike" Greely	Dem	George R. Johnston	Dem hold
13	Jack Gunderson (Note: Redistricted from district 13 to 35.)	Dem	George R. Johnston	Dem hold
13	John C. Hall	Dem	George R. Johnston	Dem hold
13	William C. Hodges	Dem	George R. Johnston	Dem hold
13	Malcolm E. Holtz	Rep	George R. Johnston	Dem hold
13	Jack E. Kessner	Rep	George R. Johnston	Dem hold
13	Pat McKittrick (Note: Redistricted from district 13 to 42.)	Dem	George R. Johnston	Dem hold
13	Tom Selstad	Rep	George R. Johnston	Dem hold
13	John B. Staigmiller (Note: Redistricted from district 13 to 33.)	Dem	George R. Johnston	Dem hold
13	Gorham E. Swanberg	Dem	George R. Johnston	Dem hold
13	John F. Tierney	Rep	George R. Johnston	Dem hold
14	David "Dave" Aageson	Rep	Gail M. Stoltz (Note: Redistricted from district 15 to 14.)	Dem hold
14	Allen C. Kolstad	Rep	Gail M. Stoltz	Dem hold
14	Walter Laas	Dem	Gail M. Stoltz	Dem hold
14	John Murphy (Note: Redistricted from district 14 to 47.)	Dem	Gail M. Stoltz	Dem hold
15	George R. Johnston	Dem	Russell Baeth	Dem hold
15	Rex Manuel	Dem	Russell Baeth	Dem hold
15	Robert E. Stephens	Dem	Russell Baeth	Dem hold
15	Gail M. Stoltz	Dem	Russell Baeth	Dem hold
16	Robert J. "Bob" Brown	Rep	Ora J. Halvorson	Dem hold
16	Ora J. Halvorson	Dem	Ora J. Halvorson	Dem hold
16	Tom L. Jones	Rep	Ora J. Halvorson	Dem hold
16	Conrad F. Lundgren	Rep	Ora J. Halvorson	Dem hold
16	Clyde A. Turner	Rep	Ora J. Halvorson	Dem hold
16	William "Bill" Zimmer	Dem	Ora J. Halvorson	Dem hold
17	James F. Fleming Jr. (Note: Redistricted from district 17 to 25.)	Dem	James A. Sloan	Dem hold
17	Carl A. Seifert (Note: Redistricted from district 17 to 26.)	Rep	James A. Sloan	Dem hold
18	A.L. "Bud" Ainsworth	Rep	James Moore	Dem hold
18	Max S. Baucus	Dem	James Moore	Dem hold
18	Tom Haines	Rep	James Moore	Dem hold
18	Gary Niles Kimble (Note: Redistricted from district 18 to 94.)	Dem	James Moore	Dem hold
18	Gary R. Marbut	Rep	James Moore	Dem hold
18	Bill Norman	Dem	James Moore	Dem hold
18	George Turman	Rep	James Moore	Dem hold
18	Robert D. Watt	Dem	James Moore	Dem hold
19	Joe Brand (Note: Redistricted from district 19 to 28.)	Dem	Bob Finley	Dem hold
19	Albert E. "Al" Kosena	Dem	Bob Finley	Dem hold
19	John "Sandy" Mehrens	Dem	Bob Finley	Dem hold
19	William "Red" Menahan (Note: Redistricted from district 19 to 90.)	Dem	Bob Finley	Dem hold
20	Robert J. "Bob" Harper (Note: Redistricted from district 20 to 88, Democratic Representative Bob Harper initially lost re-nomination in the Democratic primary by two votes to fellow Democratic Representative Jerry Lombardi. However, a judge later ruled the election invalid and the Montana Democratic Central Committee selected Bob Harper to be the party's general election nominee. Representative Harper then won re-election in the general election in district 88.)	Dem	William G. Gwynn	Dem hold
20	John E. "Jack" Healy	Dem	William G. Gwynn	Dem hold
20	Robert E. "Bob" Lee	Dem	William G. Gwynn	Dem hold
20	Jerry V. Lombardi	Dem	William G. Gwynn	Dem hold
20	John "J.D." Lynch (Note: Redistricted from district 20 to 87.)	Dem	William G. Gwynn	Dem hold
20	Joe Quilici (Note: Redistricted from district 20 to 84.)	Dem	William G. Gwynn	Dem hold
21	Tom Clemow	Rep	William R. "Bill" Baeth (Note: Redistricted from district 23 to 21.)	Dem hold
21	James W. Flynn	Dem	William R. "Bill" Baeth	Dem hold
22	John Brian Driscoll (Note: Redistricted from district 22 to 91.)	Dem	Arthur H. Shelden (Note: Redistricted from district 23 to 22.)	Dem hold
22	C. Thornton Mann	Rep	Arthur H. Shelden	Dem hold
23	William R. "Bill" Baeth	Dem	Orin P. Kendall	Dem hold
23	Orin P. Kendall	Dem	Orin P. Kendall	Dem hold
23	Joe R. Roberts	Dem	Orin P. Kendall	Dem hold
23	Arthur H. Shelden	Dem	Orin P. Kendall	Dem hold
24	New district		**Joseph M. Magone**	**Dem gain**
25	New district		James F. Fleming Jr.	Dem hold
26	New district		Carl A. Seifert	Rep hold
27	New district		**Verner L. Bertelsen**	**Rep gain**
28	New district		Joe Brand	Dem hold
29	New district		**Peter M. "Mike" Meloy**	**Dem gain**
30	New district		**Betty L. Babcock**	**Rep gain**
31	New district		**A. T. "Tom" Rasmussen**	**Rep gain**
32	New district		**Paul T. Richards**	**Dem gain**
33	New district		John B. Staigmiller	Dem hold
34	New district		**Helen G. O'Connell**	**Dem gain**
35	New district		Jack Gunderson	Dem hold
36	New district		**Joseph S. "Joe" Tropila**	**Dem gain**
37	New district		**Dennis A. Lester**	**Dem gain**
38	New district		**Peter J. Gilligan Jr.**	**Dem gain**
39	New district		**Duane P. "Mac" McFadden**	**Dem gain**
40	New district		**Bill Thomas**	**Dem gain**
41	New district		**Jack K. Moore**	**Rep gain**
42	New district		Pat McKittrick	Dem hold
43	New district		**Geraldine Travis**	**Dem gain**
44	New district		**W. Jay Fabrega**	**Rep gain**
45	New district		Elmer Schye	Rep hold
46	New district		**Hershel M. Robbins**	**Dem gain**
47	New district		John Murphy	Dem hold
48	New district		Fred O. Barrett	Rep hold
49	New district		**Edward Lien**	**Dem gain**
50	New district		**E. N. Dassinger**	**Dem gain**
51	New district		**Carroll V. South**	**Dem gain**
52	New district		Lee Hubing	Rep hold
53	New district		**Oscar S. Kvaalen**	**Rep gain**
54	New district		**William M. "Willie" Day**	**Dem gain**
55	New district		**L. E. "Gene" Wood**	**Rep gain**
56	New district		**Harold A. Wyrick**	**Rep gain**
57	New district		Carl M. Smith	Rep hold
58	New district		**Thomas R. Conroy**	**Dem gain**
59	New district		**Esther G. Bengtson**	**Dem gain**
60	New district		Tom Hager	Rep hold
61	New district		**Roberto M. Federico**	**Dem gain**
62	New district		Harold E. Gerke	Dem hold
63	New district		Harrison G. Fagg	Rep hold
64	New district		Lloyd C. Lockrem Jr.	Rep hold
65	New district		Wallace W. "Wally" Mercer	Rep hold
66	New district		**A. B. Guthrie**	**Rep gain**
67	New district		Polly Holmes	Dem hold
68	New district		Herb Huennekens	Dem hold
69	New district		**Wes Teague**	**Dem gain**
70	New district		**J. Melvin Williams**	**Dem gain**
71	New district		**Martha S. Herlevi**	**Dem gain**
72	New district		Alvin Hageman	Dem hold
73	New district		**Orval S. Ellison**	**Rep gain**
74	New district		Dan Yardley	Dem hold
75	New district		Robert A. Ellerd	Rep hold
76	New district		**John P. Scully**	**Dem gain**
77	New district		Dorothy M. Bradley	Dem hold
78	New district		**John C. Vincent**	**Dem gain**
79	New district		**William E. "Bill" Asher**	**Rep gain**
80	New district		Robert L. "Bob" Marks	Rep hold
81	New district		**John H. Anderson Jr.**	**Rep gain**
82	New district		**C. R. Anderson**	**Rep gain**
83	New district		**Al Luebeck**	**Dem gain**
84	New district		Joe Quilici	Dem hold
85	New district		**James T. Mular**	**Dem gain**
86	New district		**Robert F. Kelly**	**Dem gain**
87	New district		John "J.D." Lynch	Dem hold
88	New district		Robert J. "Bob" Harper	Dem hold
89	New district		**Joe F. Kanduch Sr.**	**Dem gain**
90	New district		William "Red" Menahan	Dem hold
91	New district		John Brian Driscoll	Dem hold
92	New district		**Sam Wolfe**	**Dem gain**
93	New district		**Howard L. Ellis**	**Rep gain**
94	New district		Gary Niles Kimble	Dem hold
95	New district		**Ann Mary Dussault**	**Dem gain**
96	New district		**Bob Palmer**	**Dem gain**
97	New district		**Duane Johnson**	**Dem gain**
98	New district		**R. Budd Gould**	**Rep gain**
99	New district		**Earl C. Lory**	**Rep gain**
100	New district		**Daniel Kemmis**	**Dem gain**

== Detailed results by district ==
=== District 1 ===
Democratic primary results
Party	Candidate	Votes	%
Democratic	Glenn E. Jacobsen (incumbent)	1,669	100.00%
Total votes		1,669	100.00%

General election results
Party	Candidate	Votes	%
Democratic	Glenn E. Jacobsen (incumbent)	2,317	100.00%
Total votes		2,317	100.00%
Democratic gain from Republican			

=== District 2 ===
Democratic primary results
Party	Candidate	Votes	%
Democratic	Wallace B. Edland (incumbent)	724	100.00%
Total votes		724	100.00%

Republican primary results
Party	Candidate	Votes	%
Republican	Art Lund (incumbent)	278	100.00%
Total votes		278	100.00%

General election results
Party	Candidate	Votes	%
Republican	Art Lund (incumbent)	1,198	52.29%
Democratic	Wallace B. Edland (incumbent)	1,093	47.71%
Total votes		2,291	100.00%
Republican gain from Democratic			

=== District 3 ===
Democratic primary results
Party	Candidate	Votes	%
Democratic	John A. Toavs	696	100.00%
Total votes		696	100.00%

Republican primary results
Party	Candidate	Votes	%
Republican	Dennis D. Casey	582	100.00%
Total votes		582	100.00%

General election results
Party	Candidate	Votes	%
Republican	Dennis D. Casey	1,475	56.34%
Democratic	John A. Toavs	1,143	43.66%
Total votes		2,618	100.00%
Republican gain from Democratic			

=== District 4 ===
Democratic primary results
Party	Candidate	Votes	%
Democratic	Ernest L. Kummerfeldt	751	100.00%
Total votes		751	100.00%

Republican primary results
Party	Candidate	Votes	%
Republican	Del Strommen	380	62.40%
Republican	Paul Stahl	229	37.60%
Total votes		609	100.00%

General election results
Party	Candidate	Votes	%
Democratic	Ernest L. Kummerfeldt	1,191	50.06%
Republican	Del Strommen	1,188	49.94%
Total votes		2,379	100.00%
Democratic hold			

=== District 5 ===
Democratic primary results
Party	Candidate	Votes	%
Democratic	Mary Kron	528	100.00%
Total votes		528	100.00%

Republican primary results
Party	Candidate	Votes	%
Republican	Paul K. Kropp	939	100.00%
Total votes		939	100.00%

General election results
Party	Candidate	Votes	%
Republican	Paul K. Kropp	1,563	52.41%
Democratic	Mary Kron	1,419	47.59%
Total votes		2,982	100.00%
Republican gain from Democratic			

=== District 6 ===
Democratic primary results
Party	Candidate	Votes	%
Democratic	Francis Bardanouve (incumbent)	998	100.00%
Total votes		998	100.00%

Republican primary results
Party	Candidate	Votes	%
Republican	Wesley C. Maddox	364	100.00%
Total votes		364	100.00%

General election results
Party	Candidate	Votes	%
Democratic	Francis Bardanouve (incumbent)	1,352	59.30%
Republican	Wesley C. Maddox	928	40.70%
Total votes		2,280	100.00%
Democratic gain from Republican			

=== District 7 ===
Democratic primary results
Party	Candidate	Votes	%
Democratic	Mary Lou Brownson	560	49.78%
Democratic	Rodney Eckberg	406	36.09%
Democratic	Stevens G. Naprstek	159	14.13%
Total votes		1,125	100.00%

Republican primary results
Party	Candidate	Votes	%
Republican	Robert Sivertsen	319	68.31%
Republican	Arlene Morgan	148	31.69%
Total votes		467	100.00%

General election results
Party	Candidate	Votes	%
Republican	Robert Sivertsen	1,452	67.63%
Democratic	Mary Lou Brownson	695	32.37%
Total votes		2,147	100.00%
Republican gain from Democratic			

=== District 8 ===
Democratic primary results
Party	Candidate	Votes	%
Democratic	Steven N. Helmbrecht	1,126	100.00%
Total votes		1,126	100.00%

Republican primary results
Party	Candidate	Votes	%
Republican	Dick Schafer	187	100.00%
Total votes		187	100.00%

General election results
Party	Candidate	Votes	%
Democratic	Steven N. Helmbrecht	1,493	65.34%
Republican	Dick Schafer	792	34.66%
Total votes		2,285	100.00%
Democratic hold			

=== District 9 ===
Democratic primary results
Party	Candidate	Votes	%
Democratic	Walter Laas (incumbent)	1,159	100.00%
Total votes		1,159	100.00%

Republican primary results
Party	Candidate	Votes	%
Republican	David Aageson (incumbent)	394	100.00%
Total votes		394	100.00%

General election results
Party	Candidate	Votes	%
Republican	David Aageson (incumbent)	1,384	53.75%
Democratic	Walter Laas (incumbent)	1,191	46.25%
Total votes		2,575	100.00%
Republican gain from Democratic			

=== District 10 ===
Democratic primary results
Party	Candidate	Votes	%
Democratic	Fred Fishbaugh	1,002	59.01%
Democratic	Robert M. Anderson	696	40.99%
Total votes		1,698	100.00%

Republican primary results
Party	Candidate	Votes	%
Republican	E. S. "Erv" Gysler	318	100.00%
Total votes		318	100.00%

General election results
Party	Candidate	Votes	%
Democratic	Fred Fishbaugh	1,486	51.03%
Republican	E. S. "Erv" Gysler	1,426	48.97%
Total votes		2,912	100.00%
Democratic gain from Republican			

=== District 11 ===
Democratic primary results
Party	Candidate	Votes	%
Democratic	Rex Manuel (incumbent)	1,260	58.39%
Democratic	Robert E. Stephens (incumbent)	898	41.61%
Total votes		2,158	100.00%

Republican primary results
Party	Candidate	Votes	%
Republican	Nels Hemstad	440	100.00%
Total votes		440	100.00%

General election results
Party	Candidate	Votes	%
Democratic	Rex Manuel (incumbent)	2,044	56.83%
Republican	Nels Hemstad	1,553	43.17%
Total votes		3,597	100.00%
Democratic hold			

=== District 12 ===
Democratic primary results
Party	Candidate	Votes	%
Democratic	Miles E. Burd	896	59.14%
Democratic	Dale L. Keil	619	40.86%
Total votes		1,515	100.00%

Republican primary results
Party	Candidate	Votes	%
Republican	Melvin Underdal	362	53.63%
Republican	James "Jim" Bjelland	313	46.37%
Total votes		675	100.00%

General election results
Party	Candidate	Votes	%
Republican	Melvin Underdal	1,705	58.71%
Democratic	Miles E. Burd	1,199	41.29%
Total votes		2,904	100.00%
Republican gain from Democratic			

=== District 13 ===
Democratic primary results
Party	Candidate	Votes	%
Democratic	George R. Johnston (incumbent)	589	50.64%
Democratic	Pat Sanderson	574	49.36%
Total votes		1,163	100.00%

Republican primary results
Party	Candidate	Votes	%
Republican	Alf Steyee	395	100.00%
Total votes		395	100.00%

General election results
Party	Candidate	Votes	%
Democratic	George R. Johnston (incumbent)	1,383	52.49%
Republican	Alf Steyee	1,252	47.51%
Total votes		2,635	100.00%
Democratic hold			

=== District 14 ===
Democratic primary results
Party	Candidate	Votes	%
Democratic	Gail M. Stoltz (incumbent)	376	36.19%
Democratic	Leo Kennerly Jr.	272	26.18%
Democratic	Lester R. Johnson	259	24.93%
Democratic	Edward J. Aubert	132	12.70%
Total votes		1,039	100.00%

Republican primary results
Party	Candidate	Votes	%
Republican	John W. "Bill" Rappold	177	73.44%
Republican	Martina Arnoux	64	26.56%
Total votes		241	100.00%

General election results
Party	Candidate	Votes	%
Democratic	Gail M. Stoltz (incumbent)	951	56.21%
Republican	John W. "Bill" Rappold	741	43.79%
Total votes		1,692	100.00%
Democratic hold			

=== District 15 ===
Democratic primary results
Party	Candidate	Votes	%
Democratic	Russell Baeth	563	50.81%
Democratic	Gerald M. Olson	545	49.19%
Total votes		1,108	100.00%

Republican primary results
Party	Candidate	Votes	%
Republican	Leroy L. Porter	314	100.00%
Total votes		314	100.00%

General election results
Party	Candidate	Votes	%
Democratic	Russell Baeth	1,194	53.78%
Republican	Leroy L. Porter	1,026	46.22%
Total votes		2,220	100.00%
Democratic hold			

=== District 16 ===
Democratic primary results
Party	Candidate	Votes	%
Democratic	Ora J. Halvorson (incumbent)	642	56.46%
Democratic	Ernest "Ernie" Lunstad	495	43.54%
Total votes		1,137	100.00%

Republican primary results
Party	Candidate	Votes	%
Republican	Walter Deets	308	61.35%
Republican	Roland Cheek	194	38.65%
Total votes		502	100.00%

General election results
Party	Candidate	Votes	%
Democratic	Ora J. Halvorson (incumbent)	1,558	59.81%
Republican	Walter Deets	1,047	40.19%
Total votes		2,605	100.00%
Democratic hold			

=== District 17 ===
Democratic primary results
Party	Candidate	Votes	%
Democratic	James A. Sloan	457	55.26%
Democratic	Lester H. "Les" Larrivee	370	44.74%
Total votes		827	100.00%

Republican primary results
Party	Candidate	Votes	%
Republican	Tom L. Jones (incumbent)	389	100.00%
Total votes		389	100.00%

General election results
Party	Candidate	Votes	%
Democratic	James A. Sloan	1,370	54.47%
Republican	Tom L. Jones (incumbent)	1,145	45.53%
Total votes		2,515	100.00%
Democratic hold			

=== District 18 ===
Democratic primary results
Party	Candidate	Votes	%
Democratic	James Moore	702	100.00%
Total votes		702	100.00%

Republican primary results
Party	Candidate	Votes	%
Republican	Conrad Lundgren (incumbent)	585	75.78%
Republican	William E. Wheeler	187	24.22%
Total votes		772	100.00%

General election results
Party	Candidate	Votes	%
Democratic	James Moore	1,421	51.47%
Republican	Conrad Lundgren (incumbent)	1,340	48.53%
Total votes		2,761	100.00%
Democratic hold			

=== District 19 ===
Democratic primary results
Party	Candidate	Votes	%
Democratic	Bob Finley	586	53.13%
Democratic	Frank B. Morrison Jr.	517	46.87%
Total votes		1,103	100.00%

Republican primary results
Party	Candidate	Votes	%
Republican	Clyde A. Turner (incumbent)	397	100.00%
Total votes		397	100.00%

General election results
Party	Candidate	Votes	%
Democratic	Bob Finley	1,477	54.66%
Republican	Clyde A. Turner (incumbent)	1,225	45.34%
Total votes		2,702	100.00%
Democratic hold			

=== District 20 ===
Democratic primary results
Party	Candidate	Votes	%
Democratic	William G. Gwynn	377	36.43%
Democratic	Maurice R. Daniel	364	35.17%
Democratic	David S. Brewer	294	28.41%
Total votes		1,035	100.00%

Republican primary results
Party	Candidate	Votes	%
Republican	Aubyn A. Curtiss	225	66.18%
Republican	O. V. "Mack" McCurry	115	33.82%
Total votes		340	100.00%

General election results
Party	Candidate	Votes	%
Democratic	William G. Gwynn	1,118	54.22%
Republican	Aubyn A. Curtiss	944	45.78%
Total votes		2,062	100.00%
Democratic hold			

=== District 21 ===
Democratic primary results
Party	Candidate	Votes	%
Democratic	William R. "Bill" Baeth (incumbent)	1,343	100.00%
Total votes		1,343	100.00%

Republican primary results
Party	Candidate	Votes	%
Republican	George A. Mahrt	80	100.00%
Total votes		80	100.00%

General election results
Party	Candidate	Votes	%
Democratic	William R. "Bill" Baeth (incumbent)	1,236	58.47%
Republican	George A. Mahrt	878	41.53%
Total votes		2,114	100.00%
Democratic hold			

=== District 22 ===
Democratic primary results
Party	Candidate	Votes	%
Democratic	Arthur H. Shelden (incumbent)	1,183	100.00%
Total votes		1,183	100.00%

Republican primary results
Party	Candidate	Votes	%
Republican	Rae L. Vinion	67	100.00%
Total votes		67	100.00%

General election results
Party	Candidate	Votes	%
Democratic	Arthur H. Shelden (incumbent)	1,304	67.67%
Republican	Rae L. Vinion	623	32.33%
Total votes		1,927	100.00%
Democratic hold			

=== District 23 ===
Democratic primary results
Party	Candidate	Votes	%
Democratic	Orin P. Kendall (incumbent)	891	59.68%
Democratic	Paul K. Harlow	602	40.32%
Total votes		1,493	100.00%

Republican primary results
Party	Candidate	Votes	%
Republican	Knute Kirkeberg	349	100.00%
Total votes		349	100.00%

General election results
Party	Candidate	Votes	%
Democratic	Orin P. Kendall (incumbent)	1,636	53.76%
Republican	Knute Kirkeberg	937	30.79%
Independent	Jack J. Nichols	470	15.45%
Total votes		3,043	100.00%
Democratic hold			

=== District 24 ===
Democratic primary results
Party	Candidate	Votes	%
Democratic	Joseph M. Magone	804	55.99%
Democratic	Claude H. "Blackie" Lackner	338	23.54%
Democratic	Allan Gleason Jr.	294	20.47%
Total votes		1,436	100.00%

Republican primary results
Party	Candidate	Votes	%
Republican	John A. Anderson	312	100.00%
Total votes		312	100.00%

General election results
Party	Candidate	Votes	%
Democratic	Joseph M. Magone	1,611	54.95%
Republican	John A. Anderson	1,321	45.05%
Total votes		2,932	100.00%
Democratic gain from Republican			

=== District 25 ===
Democratic primary results
Party	Candidate	Votes	%
Democratic	James F. Fleming Jr. (incumbent)	926	100.00%
Total votes		926	100.00%

General election results
Party	Candidate	Votes	%
Democratic	James F. Fleming Jr. (incumbent)	1,652	70.66%
Independent	Ralph Morin (Note: The candidate ran a write-in campaign in this election.)	686	29.34%
Total votes		2,338	100.00%
Democratic hold			

=== District 26 ===
Democratic primary results
Party	Candidate	Votes	%
Democratic	Larry L. Robinson	797	100.00%
Total votes		797	100.00%

Republican primary results
Party	Candidate	Votes	%
Republican	Carl A. Seifert (incumbent)	773	100.00%
Total votes		773	100.00%

General election results
Party	Candidate	Votes	%
Republican	Carl A. Seifert (incumbent)	1,627	52.52%
Democratic	Larry L. Robinson	1,471	47.48%
Total votes		3,098	100.00%
Republican hold			

=== District 27 ===
Democratic primary results
Party	Candidate	Votes	%
Democratic	Joe Strakal	529	40.82%
Democratic	Blair F. Boedecker	402	31.02%
Democratic	George W. Thompson	365	28.16%
Total votes		1,296	100.00%

Republican primary results
Party	Candidate	Votes	%
Republican	Verner L. Bertelsen	406	55.62%
Republican	John F. Bell (incumbent)	324	44.38%
Total votes		730	100.00%

General election results
Party	Candidate	Votes	%
Republican	Verner L. Bertelsen	1,496	52.29%
Democratic	Joe Strakal	1,365	47.71%
Total votes		2,861	100.00%
Republican gain from Democratic			

=== District 28 ===
Democratic primary results
Party	Candidate	Votes	%
Democratic	Joe Brand (incumbent)	980	100.00%
Total votes		980	100.00%

Republican primary results
Party	Candidate	Votes	%
Republican	Martin P. Olsen	334	100.00%
Total votes		334	100.00%

General election results
Party	Candidate	Votes	%
Democratic	Joe Brand (incumbent)	1,531	68.26%
Republican	Martin P. Olsen	712	31.74%
Total votes		2,243	100.00%
Democratic hold			

=== District 29 ===
Democratic primary results
Party	Candidate	Votes	%
Democratic	Peter M. "Mike" Meloy	734	41.92%
Democratic	Mike Koehnke	427	24.39%
Democratic	John G. Billings	333	19.02%
Democratic	Kay J. Miller	257	14.68%
Total votes		1,751	100.00%

Republican primary results
Party	Candidate	Votes	%
Republican	Ruth B. Castles (incumbent)	259	52.54%
Republican	Roger K. Barrett	234	47.46%
Total votes		493	100.00%

General election results
Party	Candidate	Votes	%
Democratic	Peter M. "Mike" Meloy	1,838	60.18%
Republican	Ruth B. Castles (incumbent)	1,216	39.82%
Total votes		3,054	100.00%
Democratic gain from Republican			

=== District 30 ===
Democratic primary results
Party	Candidate	Votes	%
Democratic	Edmund F. Sheehy Jr.	928	100.00%
Total votes		928	100.00%

Republican primary results
Party	Candidate	Votes	%
Republican	Betty L. Babcock	527	58.43%
Republican	Hal Harper (incumbent)	375	41.57%
Total votes		902	100.00%

General election results
Party	Candidate	Votes	%
Republican	Betty L. Babcock	1,671	54.88%
Democratic	Edmund F. Sheehy Jr.	1,374	45.12%
Total votes		3,045	100.00%
Republican gain from Democratic			

=== District 31 ===
Democratic primary results
Party	Candidate	Votes	%
Democratic	Barbara Bennetts (incumbent)	761	56.79%
Democratic	Elton M. Andrew	442	32.99%
Democratic	Kenneth D. Stockburger	137	10.22%
Total votes		1,340	100.00%

Republican primary results
Party	Candidate	Votes	%
Republican	A. T. "Tom" Rasmussen	290	63.32%
Republican	Phil Strope	168	36.68%
Total votes		458	100.00%

General election results
Party	Candidate	Votes	%
Republican	A. T. "Tom" Rasmussen	1,419	57.80%
Democratic	Barbara Bennetts (incumbent)	1,036	42.20%
Total votes		2,455	100.00%
Republican gain from Democratic			

=== District 32 ===
Democratic primary results
Party	Candidate	Votes	%
Democratic	Paul T. Richards	718	55.92%
Democratic	Tom Behan	566	44.08%
Total votes		1,284	100.00%

Republican primary results
Party	Candidate	Votes	%
Republican	William C. "Bill" Campbell (incumbent)	479	65.35%
Republican	Margaret S. Davis	149	20.33%
Republican	Hal Jacobson	105	14.32%
Total votes		733	100.00%

General election results
Party	Candidate	Votes	%
Democratic	Paul T. Richards	1,693	55.00%
Republican	William C. "Bill" Campbell (incumbent)	1,385	45.00%
Total votes		3,078	100.00%
Democratic gain from Republican			

=== District 33 ===
Democratic primary results
Party	Candidate	Votes	%
Democratic	John B. Staigmiller (incumbent)	473	65.60%
Democratic	John F. "Tag" Rittel	248	34.40%
Total votes		721	100.00%

Republican primary results
Party	Candidate	Votes	%
Republican	William J. "Bill" Barrett (Note: Although William J. "Bill" Barrett won the Republican primary, Ken Gilbert was the Republican nominee in the general election.)	332	100.00%
Total votes		332	100.00%

General election results
Party	Candidate	Votes	%
Democratic	John B. Staigmiller (incumbent)	1,221	58.67%
Republican	Ken Gilbert	860	41.33%
Total votes		2,081	100.00%
Democratic hold			

=== District 34 ===
Democratic primary results
Party	Candidate	Votes	%
Democratic	Helen G. O'Connell	441	50.81%
Democratic	Gertrude Lindgren	427	49.19%
Total votes		868	100.00%

General election results
Party	Candidate	Votes	%
Democratic	Helen G. O'Connell	1,135	100.00%
Total votes		1,135	100.00%
Democratic gain from Republican			

=== District 35 ===
Democratic primary results
Party	Candidate	Votes	%
Democratic	Jack Gunderson (incumbent)	487	100.00%
Total votes		487	100.00%

Republican primary results
Party	Candidate	Votes	%
Republican	Robert F. Pappin	244	100.00%
Total votes		244	100.00%

General election results
Party	Candidate	Votes	%
Democratic	Jack Gunderson (incumbent)	931	62.44%
Republican	Robert F. Pappin	560	37.56%
Total votes		1,491	100.00%
Democratic hold			

=== District 36 ===
Democratic primary results
Party	Candidate	Votes	%
Democratic	Joe Tropila	451	55.82%
Democratic	James M. Wylder	357	44.18%
Total votes		808	100.00%

Republican primary results
Party	Candidate	Votes	%
Republican	Tom Selstad (incumbent)	330	100.00%
Total votes		330	100.00%

General election results
Party	Candidate	Votes	%
Democratic	Joe Tropila	984	54.73%
Republican	Tom Selstad (incumbent)	814	45.27%
Total votes		1,798	100.00%
Democratic gain from Republican			

=== District 37 ===
Democratic primary results
Party	Candidate	Votes	%
Democratic	Dennis A. Lester	472	64.92%
Democratic	Louis Fontana	255	35.08%
Total votes		727	100.00%

General election results
Party	Candidate	Votes	%
Democratic	Dennis A. Lester	942	100.00%
Total votes		942	100.00%
Democratic gain from Republican			

=== District 38 ===
Democratic primary results
Party	Candidate	Votes	%
Democratic	Peter J. Gilligan Jr.	376	59.68%
Democratic	William "Bill" Beaulieu	254	40.32%
Total votes		630	100.00%

Republican primary results
Party	Candidate	Votes	%
Republican	Lee Lux	118	100.00%
Total votes		118	100.00%

General election results
Party	Candidate	Votes	%
Democratic	Peter J. Gilligan Jr.	943	72.04%
Republican	Lee Lux	366	27.96%
Total votes		1,309	100.00%
Democratic gain from Republican			

=== District 39 ===
Democratic primary results
Party	Candidate	Votes	%
Democratic	Duane P. "Mac" McFadden	374	50.82%
Democratic	William C. Hodges (incumbent)	362	49.18%
Total votes		736	100.00%

Republican primary results
Party	Candidate	Votes	%
Republican	Paul G. Pistoria	207	100.00%
Total votes		207	100.00%

General election results
Party	Candidate	Votes	%
Democratic	Duane P. "Mac" McFadden	903	58.56%
Republican	Paul G. Pistoria	639	41.44%
Total votes		1,542	100.00%
Democratic gain from Republican			

=== District 40 ===
Democratic primary results
Party	Candidate	Votes	%
Democratic	Bill Thomas	616	100.00%
Total votes		616	100.00%

Republican primary results
Party	Candidate	Votes	%
Republican	Malcolm Holtz (incumbent)	463	100.00%
Total votes		463	100.00%

General election results
Party	Candidate	Votes	%
Democratic	Bill Thomas	1,084	56.22%
Republican	Malcolm Holtz (incumbent)	844	43.78%
Total votes		1,928	100.00%
Democratic gain from Republican			

=== District 41 ===
Democratic primary results
Party	Candidate	Votes	%
Democratic	Margaret L. Gilfeather	426	59.00%
Democratic	Edward P. Beaulieu Jr.	296	41.00%
Total votes		722	100.00%

Republican primary results
Party	Candidate	Votes	%
Republican	Jack K. Moore	337	58.51%
Republican	Chet Hansen	239	41.49%
Total votes		576	100.00%

General election results
Party	Candidate	Votes	%
Republican	Jack K. Moore	1,137	55.27%
Democratic	Margaret L. Gilfeather	920	44.73%
Total votes		2,057	100.00%
Republican gain from Democratic			

=== District 42 ===
Democratic primary results
Party	Candidate	Votes	%
Democratic	Pat McKittrick (incumbent)	507	100.00%
Total votes		507	100.00%

Republican primary results
Party	Candidate	Votes	%
Republican	John A. Lassey	291	100.00%
Total votes		291	100.00%

General election results
Party	Candidate	Votes	%
Democratic	Pat McKittrick (incumbent)	873	58.79%
Republican	John A. Lassey	612	41.21%
Total votes		1,485	100.00%
Democratic hold			

=== District 43 ===
Democratic primary results
Party	Candidate	Votes	%
Democratic	Geraldine Travis	18	90.00%
Democratic	Bill Pena	2	10.00%
Total votes		20	100.00%

Republican primary results
Party	Candidate	Votes	%
Republican	Don Fulgham	3	100.00%
Total votes		3	100.00%

General election results
Party	Candidate	Votes	%
Democratic	Geraldine Travis	20	80.00%
Republican	Don Fulgham	5	20.00%
Total votes		25	100.00%
Democratic gain from Republican			

=== District 44 ===
Democratic primary results
Party	Candidate	Votes	%
Democratic	B. F. "Chris" Christiaens	278	100.00%
Total votes		278	100.00%

Republican primary results
Party	Candidate	Votes	%
Republican	W. Jay Fabrega	355	100.00%
Total votes		355	100.00%

General election results
Party	Candidate	Votes	%
Republican	W. Jay Fabrega	726	53.34%
Democratic	B. F. "Chris" Christiaens	635	46.66%
Total votes		1,361	100.00%
Republican gain from Democratic			

=== District 45 ===
Democratic primary results
Party	Candidate	Votes	%
Democratic	Jay Park	585	100.00%
Total votes		585	100.00%

Republican primary results
Party	Candidate	Votes	%
Republican	Elmer Schye (incumbent)	781	100.00%
Total votes		781	100.00%

General election results
Party	Candidate	Votes	%
Republican	Elmer Schye (incumbent)	1,453	57.70%
Democratic	Jay Park	1,065	42.30%
Total votes		2,518	100.00%
Republican hold			

=== District 46 ===
Democratic primary results
Party	Candidate	Votes	%
Democratic	Hershel M. Robbins	929	59.44%
Democratic	Mac White	634	40.56%
Total votes		1,563	100.00%

Republican primary results
Party	Candidate	Votes	%
Republican	Joseph K. Kuzara	656	100.00%
Total votes		656	100.00%

General election results
Party	Candidate	Votes	%
Democratic	Hershel M. Robbins	1,910	55.54%
Republican	Joseph K. Kuzara	1,529	44.46%
Total votes		3,439	100.00%
Democratic gain from Republican			

=== District 47 ===
Democratic primary results
Party	Candidate	Votes	%
Democratic	John Murphy (incumbent)	984	100.00%
Total votes		984	100.00%

Republican primary results
Party	Candidate	Votes	%
Republican	J. O. "Boots" Asbjornson (incumbent)	622	100.00%
Total votes		622	100.00%

General election results
Party	Candidate	Votes	%
Democratic	John Murphy (incumbent)	1,865	57.62%
Republican	J. O. "Boots" Asbjornson (incumbent)	1,372	42.38%
Total votes		3,237	100.00%
Democratic hold			

=== District 48 ===
Democratic primary results
Party	Candidate	Votes	%
Democratic	Donn Pennell	490	58.89%
Democratic	Pietr "Pete" Zwolle	342	41.11%
Total votes		832	100.00%

Republican primary results
Party	Candidate	Votes	%
Republican	Fred O. Barrett (incumbent)	621	100.00%
Total votes		621	100.00%

General election results
Party	Candidate	Votes	%
Republican	Fred O. Barrett (incumbent)	1,604	57.51%
Democratic	Donn Pennell	1,185	42.49%
Total votes		2,789	100.00%
Republican hold			

=== District 49 ===
Democratic primary results
Party	Candidate	Votes	%
Democratic	Edward Lien	833	100.00%
Total votes		833	100.00%

Republican primary results
Party	Candidate	Votes	%
Republican	Louis M. Schnebly	579	100.00%
Total votes		579	100.00%

General election results
Party	Candidate	Votes	%
Democratic	Edward Lien	1,396	50.09%
Republican	Louis M. Schnebly	1,391	49.91%
Total votes		2,787	100.00%
Democratic gain from Republican			

=== District 50 ===
Democratic primary results
Party	Candidate	Votes	%
Democratic	E. N. Dassinger	975	100.00%
Total votes		975	100.00%

Republican primary results
Party	Candidate	Votes	%
Republican	Archie Wilson	243	43.94%
Republican	Harold Zent	218	39.42%
Republican	Corey Welter	92	16.64%
Total votes		553	100.00%

General election results
Party	Candidate	Votes	%
Democratic	E. N. Dassinger	1,442	50.61%
Republican	Archie Wilson	1,407	49.39%
Total votes		2,849	100.00%
Democratic gain from Republican			

=== District 51 ===
Democratic primary results
Party	Candidate	Votes	%
Democratic	Carroll V. South	729	100.00%
Total votes		729	100.00%

Republican primary results
Party	Candidate	Votes	%
Republican	Lyman W. Choate	300	52.45%
Republican	James A. Graham	272	47.55%
Total votes		572	100.00%

General election results
Party	Candidate	Votes	%
Democratic	Carroll V. South	1,640	64.01%
Republican	Lyman W. Choate	922	35.99%
Total votes		2,562	100.00%
Democratic gain from Republican			

=== District 52 ===
Democratic primary results
Party	Candidate	Votes	%
Democratic	Les Hirsch	433	55.02%
Democratic	William J. Krutzfeldt	354	44.98%
Total votes		787	100.00%

Republican primary results
Party	Candidate	Votes	%
Republican	Lee Hubing (incumbent)	777	100.00%
Total votes		777	100.00%

General election results
Party	Candidate	Votes	%
Republican	Lee Hubing (incumbent)	1,586	52.64%
Democratic	Les Hirsch	1,427	47.36%
Total votes		3,013	100.00%
Republican hold			

=== District 53 ===
Democratic primary results
Party	Candidate	Votes	%
Democratic	Henry J. Schepens (incumbent)	406	100.00%
Total votes		406	100.00%

Republican primary results
Party	Candidate	Votes	%
Republican	Oscar S. Kvaalen (incumbent)	426	100.00%
Total votes		426	100.00%

General election results
Party	Candidate	Votes	%
Republican	Oscar S. Kvaalen (incumbent)	1,554	62.48%
Democratic	Henry J. Schepens (incumbent)	933	37.52%
Total votes		2,487	100.00%
Republican gain from Democratic			

=== District 54 ===
Democratic primary results
Party	Candidate	Votes	%
Democratic	William M. "Willie" Day	563	100.00%
Total votes		563	100.00%

Republican primary results
Party	Candidate	Votes	%
Republican	LeRoy E. "Bud" Tanglen	456	100.00%
Total votes		456	100.00%

General election results
Party	Candidate	Votes	%
Democratic	William M. "Willie" Day	1,590	57.84%
Republican	LeRoy E. "Bud" Tanglen	1,159	42.16%
Total votes		2,749	100.00%
Democratic gain from Republican			

=== District 55 ===
Democratic primary results
Party	Candidate	Votes	%
Democratic	Kenneth Kubesh	478	100.00%
Total votes		478	100.00%

Republican primary results
Party	Candidate	Votes	%
Republican	L. E. "Gene" Wood	717	100.00%
Total votes		717	100.00%

General election results
Party	Candidate	Votes	%
Republican	L. E. "Gene" Wood	1,408	57.19%
Democratic	Kenneth Kubesh	1,054	42.81%
Total votes		2,462	100.00%
Republican gain from Democratic			

=== District 56 ===
Democratic primary results
Party	Candidate	Votes	%
Democratic	Harold W. Jensen	525	72.92%
Democratic	Marshall M. Shelden	195	27.08%
Total votes		720	100.00%

Republican primary results
Party	Candidate	Votes	%
Republican	Harold A. Wyrick	617	64.95%
Republican	Gordon Vanderpan	333	35.05%
Total votes		950	100.00%

General election results
Party	Candidate	Votes	%
Republican	Harold A. Wyrick	1,583	57.36%
Democratic	Harold W. Jensen	1,177	42.64%
Total votes		2,760	100.00%
Republican gain from Democratic			

=== District 57 ===
Democratic primary results
Party	Candidate	Votes	%
Democratic	Anne Amsden	401	100.00%
Total votes		401	100.00%

Republican primary results
Party	Candidate	Votes	%
Republican	Carl M. Smith (incumbent)	537	100.00%
Total votes		537	100.00%

General election results
Party	Candidate	Votes	%
Republican	Carl M. Smith (incumbent)	1,399	65.71%
Democratic	Anne Amsden	730	34.29%
Total votes		2,129	100.00%
Republican hold			

=== District 58 ===
Democratic primary results
Party	Candidate	Votes	%
Democratic	Thomas R. Conroy	782	54.46%
Democratic	Clyde A. Rader	654	45.54%
Total votes		1,436	100.00%

Republican primary results
Party	Candidate	Votes	%
Republican	John E. Walborn (incumbent)	248	100.00%
Total votes		248	100.00%

American Party primary results
Party	Candidate	Votes	%
American	Ed Dobson	6	100.00%
Total votes		6	100.00%

General election results
Party	Candidate	Votes	%
Democratic	Thomas R. Conroy	1,018	45.59%
Republican	John E. Walborn (incumbent)	867	38.83%
American	Ed Dobson	348	15.58%
Total votes		2,233	100.00%
Democratic gain from Republican			

=== District 59 ===
Democratic primary results
Party	Candidate	Votes	%
Democratic	Esther G. Bengtson	427	100.00%
Total votes		427	100.00%

Republican primary results
Party	Candidate	Votes	%
Republican	Lynn K. Severance	359	100.00%
Total votes		359	100.00%

General election results
Party	Candidate	Votes	%
Democratic	Esther G. Bengtson	1,023	53.79%
Republican	Lynn K. Severance	879	46.21%
Total votes		1,902	100.00%
Democratic gain from Republican			

=== District 60 ===
Democratic primary results
Party	Candidate	Votes	%
Democratic	Gene Frates	213	56.65%
Democratic	Lewis E. Brueggemann	163	43.35%
Total votes		376	100.00%

Republican primary results
Party	Candidate	Votes	%
Republican	Tom Hager (incumbent)	368	100.00%
Total votes		368	100.00%

General election results
Party	Candidate	Votes	%
Republican	Tom Hager (incumbent)	1,035	51.29%
Democratic	Gene Frates	983	48.71%
Total votes		2,018	100.00%
Republican hold			

=== District 61 ===
Democratic primary results
Party	Candidate	Votes	%
Democratic	Roberto M. Federico	221	53.38%
Democratic	James A. LeRoy	193	46.62%
Total votes		414	100.00%

Republican primary results
Party	Candidate	Votes	%
Republican	John B. Fine	220	100.00%
Total votes		220	100.00%

General election results
Party	Candidate	Votes	%
Democratic	Roberto M. Federico	959	59.79%
Republican	John B. Fine	645	40.21%
Total votes		1,604	100.00%
Democratic gain from Republican			

=== District 62 ===
Democratic primary results
Party	Candidate	Votes	%
Democratic	Harold E. Gerke (incumbent)	311	100.00%
Total votes		311	100.00%

Republican primary results
Party	Candidate	Votes	%
Republican	Robert L. Stephens Jr.	366	100.00%
Total votes		366	100.00%

General election results
Party	Candidate	Votes	%
Democratic	Harold E. Gerke (incumbent)	1,132	61.02%
Republican	Robert L. Stephens Jr.	723	38.98%
Total votes		1,855	100.00%
Democratic hold			

=== District 63 ===
Democratic primary results
Party	Candidate	Votes	%
Democratic	Iris P. Walthall	226	100.00%
Total votes		226	100.00%

Republican primary results
Party	Candidate	Votes	%
Republican	Harrison G. Fagg (incumbent)	660	51.24%
Republican	Leon Odegaard	628	48.76%
Total votes		1,288	100.00%

General election results
Party	Candidate	Votes	%
Republican	Harrison G. Fagg (incumbent)	1,594	71.45%
Democratic	Iris P. Walthall	637	28.55%
Total votes		2,231	100.00%
Republican hold			

=== District 64 ===
Democratic primary results
Party	Candidate	Votes	%
Democratic	John H. Rose	208	100.00%
Total votes		208	100.00%

Republican primary results
Party	Candidate	Votes	%
Republican	Lloyd C. Lockrem Jr. (incumbent)	891	100.00%
Total votes		891	100.00%

General election results
Party	Candidate	Votes	%
Republican	Lloyd C. Lockrem Jr. (incumbent)	1,799	70.27%
Democratic	John H. Rose	761	29.73%
Total votes		2,560	100.00%
Republican hold			

=== District 65 ===
Democratic primary results
Party	Candidate	Votes	%
Democratic	Jim Hayfield	375	100.00%
Total votes		375	100.00%

Republican primary results
Party	Candidate	Votes	%
Republican	Wallace W. "Wally" Mercer (incumbent)	712	68.26%
Republican	W. V. Fenter	331	31.74%
Total votes		1,043	100.00%

General election results
Party	Candidate	Votes	%
Republican	Wallace W. "Wally" Mercer (incumbent)	1,515	53.44%
Democratic	Jim Hayfield	1,320	46.56%
Total votes		2,835	100.00%
Republican hold			

=== District 66 ===
Democratic primary results
Party	Candidate	Votes	%
Democratic	Don Scanlin	322	100.00%
Total votes		322	100.00%

Republican primary results
Party	Candidate	Votes	%
Republican	A. B. Guthrie	311	46.56%
Republican	Roy E. Russell	198	29.64%
Republican	Matilda "Tillie" Pierce	159	23.80%
Total votes		668	100.00%

General election results
Party	Candidate	Votes	%
Republican	A. B. Guthrie	1,274	55.51%
Democratic	Don Scanlin	1,021	44.49%
Total votes		2,295	100.00%
Republican gain from Democratic			

=== District 67 ===
Democratic primary results
Party	Candidate	Votes	%
Democratic	Polly Holmes (incumbent)	309	68.51%
Democratic	Neal C. Kirkness	142	31.49%
Total votes		451	100.00%

Republican primary results
Party	Candidate	Votes	%
Republican	Robert E. Glennen (incumbent)	329	100.00%
Total votes		329	100.00%

General election results
Party	Candidate	Votes	%
Democratic	Polly Holmes (incumbent)	1,509	65.55%
Republican	Robert E. Glennen (incumbent)	793	34.45%
Total votes		2,302	100.00%
Democratic hold			

=== District 68 ===
Democratic primary results
Party	Candidate	Votes	%
Democratic	Herb Huennekens (incumbent)	352	100.00%
Total votes		352	100.00%

Republican primary results
Party	Candidate	Votes	%
Republican	Chris Angle	471	100.00%
Total votes		471	100.00%

General election results
Party	Candidate	Votes	%
Democratic	Herb Huennekens (incumbent)	1,637	69.01%
Republican	Chris Angle	735	30.99%
Total votes		2,372	100.00%
Democratic hold			

=== District 69 ===
Democratic primary results
Party	Candidate	Votes	%
Democratic	Wes Teague	130	37.79%
Democratic	Lloyd E. Hartford	110	31.98%
Democratic	Elton J. Ahlgren	104	30.23%
Total votes		344	100.00%

Republican primary results
Party	Candidate	Votes	%
Republican	Eldon L. Piper	142	100.00%
Total votes		142	100.00%

General election results
Party	Candidate	Votes	%
Democratic	Wes Teague	988	72.59%
Republican	Eldon L. Piper	373	27.41%
Total votes		1,361	100.00%
Democratic gain from Republican			

=== District 70 ===
Democratic primary results
Party	Candidate	Votes	%
Democratic	J. Melvin Williams	483	100.00%
Total votes		483	100.00%

General election results
Party	Candidate	Votes	%
Democratic	J. Melvin Williams	1,789	100.00%
Total votes		1,789	100.00%
Democratic gain from Republican			

=== District 71 ===
Democratic primary results
Party	Candidate	Votes	%
Democratic	Martha S. Herlevi	1,648	100.00%
Total votes		1,648	100.00%

Republican primary results
Party	Candidate	Votes	%
Republican	James H. "Jim" Burnett (incumbent)	460	100.00%
Total votes		460	100.00%

General election results
Party	Candidate	Votes	%
Democratic	Martha S. Herlevi	1,785	54.24%
Republican	James H. "Jim" Burnett (incumbent)	1,506	45.76%
Total votes		3,291	100.00%
Democratic gain from Republican			

=== District 72 ===
Democratic primary results
Party	Candidate	Votes	%
Democratic	Alvin Hageman (incumbent)	957	100.00%
Total votes		957	100.00%

Republican primary results
Party	Candidate	Votes	%
Republican	Owen B. Ketchum	636	100.00%
Total votes		636	100.00%

General election results
Party	Candidate	Votes	%
Democratic	Alvin Hageman (incumbent)	1,491	50.46%
Republican	Owen B. Ketchum	1,464	49.54%
Total votes		2,955	100.00%
Democratic hold			

=== District 73 ===
Democratic primary results
Party	Candidate	Votes	%
Democratic	Allyn W. O'Hair	447	100.00%
Total votes		447	100.00%

Republican primary results
Party	Candidate	Votes	%
Republican	Orval S. Ellison	948	44.89%
Republican	Paul E. Christensen	597	28.27%
Republican	Bill Warfield (incumbent)	567	26.85%
Total votes		2,112	100.00%

General election results
Party	Candidate	Votes	%
Republican	Orval S. Ellison	2,028	60.63%
Democratic	Allyn W. O'Hair	1,317	39.37%
Total votes		3,345	100.00%
Republican gain from Democratic			

=== District 74 ===
Democratic primary results
Party	Candidate	Votes	%
Democratic	Dan Yardley (incumbent)	777	100.00%
Total votes		777	100.00%

Republican primary results
Party	Candidate	Votes	%
Republican	Dorothy Strong Bradley	564	56.23%
Republican	Robert E. Zander	439	43.77%
Total votes		1,003	100.00%

General election results
Party	Candidate	Votes	%
Democratic	Dan Yardley (incumbent)	1,658	56.63%
Republican	Dorothy Strong Bradley	1,270	43.37%
Total votes		2,928	100.00%
Democratic hold			

=== District 75 ===
Democratic primary results
Party	Candidate	Votes	%
Democratic	Lillian Williams	584	100.00%
Total votes		584	100.00%

Republican primary results
Party	Candidate	Votes	%
Republican	Robert A. Ellerd (incumbent)	784	64.85%
Republican	Gary Olsen	425	35.15%
Total votes		1,209	100.00%

General election results
Party	Candidate	Votes	%
Republican	Robert A. Ellerd (incumbent)	1,950	62.00%
Democratic	Lillian E. Williams	1,195	38.00%
Total votes		3,145	100.00%
Republican hold			

=== District 76 ===
Democratic primary results
Party	Candidate	Votes	%
Democratic	John P. Scully	387	76.63%
Democratic	Jimmy "Crackers" Chirgwin	118	23.37%
Total votes		505	100.00%

Republican primary results
Party	Candidate	Votes	%
Republican	Sam Anderson	421	100.00%
Total votes		421	100.00%

General election results
Party	Candidate	Votes	%
Democratic	John P. Scully	1,212	58.92%
Republican	Sam Anderson	845	41.08%
Total votes		2,057	100.00%
Democratic gain from Republican			

=== District 77 ===
Democratic primary results
Party	Candidate	Votes	%
Democratic	Dorothy Bradley (incumbent)	537	100.00%
Total votes		537	100.00%

Republican primary results
Party	Candidate	Votes	%
Republican	Robert Ross "Bud" Williamson	554	100.00%
Total votes		554	100.00%

General election results
Party	Candidate	Votes	%
Democratic	Dorothy Bradley (incumbent)	1,212	52.24%
Republican	Robert Ross "Bud" Williamson	1,108	47.76%
Total votes		2,320	100.00%
Democratic hold			

=== District 78 ===
Democratic primary results
Party	Candidate	Votes	%
Democratic	John C. Vincent	575	68.62%
Democratic	Dick Corne'	263	31.38%
Total votes		838	100.00%

Republican primary results
Party	Candidate	Votes	%
Republican	Tom Lehman	495	100.00%
Total votes		495	100.00%

General election results
Party	Candidate	Votes	%
Democratic	John C. Vincent	1,659	66.71%
Republican	Tom Lehman	828	33.29%
Total votes		2,487	100.00%
Democratic gain from Republican			

=== District 79 ===
Democratic primary results
Party	Candidate	Votes	%
Democratic	William A. Fairhurst	796	100.00%
Total votes		796	100.00%

Republican primary results
Party	Candidate	Votes	%
Republican	William E. "Bill" Asher	557	100.00%
Total votes		557	100.00%

General election results
Party	Candidate	Votes	%
Republican	William E. "Bill" Asher	1,641	59.05%
Democratic	William A. Fairhurst	1,138	40.95%
Total votes		2,779	100.00%
Republican gain from Democratic			

=== District 80 ===
Democratic primary results
Party	Candidate	Votes	%
Democratic	Paul A. Bessler	1,192	100.00%
Total votes		1,192	100.00%

Republican primary results
Party	Candidate	Votes	%
Republican	Robert L. "Bob" Marks (incumbent)	476	100.00%
Total votes		476	100.00%

General election results
Party	Candidate	Votes	%
Republican	Robert L. "Bob" Marks (incumbent)	1,470	51.31%
Democratic	Paul A. Bessler	1,395	48.69%
Total votes		2,865	100.00%
Republican hold			

=== District 81 ===
Republican primary results
Party	Candidate	Votes	%
Republican	John H. Anderson Jr.	1,147	100.00%
Total votes		1,147	100.00%

General election results
Party	Candidate	Votes	%
Republican	John H. Anderson Jr.	2,263	100.00%
Total votes		2,263	100.00%
Republican gain from Democratic			

=== District 82 ===
Democratic primary results
Party	Candidate	Votes	%
Democratic	William M. Hand	251	100.00%
Total votes		251	100.00%

Republican primary results
Party	Candidate	Votes	%
Republican	C. R. Anderson	859	52.06%
Republican	Tom Clemow (incumbent)	791	47.94%
Total votes		1,650	100.00%

General election results
Party	Candidate	Votes	%
Republican	C. R. Anderson	1,198	53.87%
Democratic	William M. Hand	1,026	46.13%
Total votes		2,224	100.00%
Republican gain from Democratic			

=== District 83 ===
Democratic primary results
Party	Candidate	Votes	%
Democratic	Al Luebeck	743	29.55%
Democratic	Robert R. Peterson	595	23.67%
Democratic	Joseph E. "Joe" Hughes	502	19.97%
Democratic	John D. Kelly	458	18.22%
Democratic	Donald G. Renz	216	8.59%
Total votes		2,514	100.00%

Republican primary results
Party	Candidate	Votes	%
Republican	Ella Mae Cromer	75	100.00%
Total votes		75	100.00%

General election results
Party	Candidate	Votes	%
Democratic	Al Luebeck	1,766	57.98%
Republican	Ella Mae Cromer	1,280	42.02%
Total votes		3,046	100.00%
Democratic gain from Republican			

=== District 84 ===
Democratic primary results
Party	Candidate	Votes	%
Democratic	Joe Quilici (incumbent)	1,668	100.00%
Total votes		1,668	100.00%

General election results
Party	Candidate	Votes	%
Democratic	Joe Quilici (incumbent)	1,899	100.00%
Total votes		1,899	100.00%
Democratic hold			

=== District 85 ===
Democratic primary results
Party	Candidate	Votes	%
Democratic	James T. Mular	773	34.73%
Democratic	Don Plessas Jr.	575	25.83%
Democratic	Jack W. Coyne	466	20.93%
Democratic	Charles R. DeWitt Jr.	412	18.51%
Total votes		2,226	100.00%

General election results
Party	Candidate	Votes	%
Democratic	James T. Mular	1,637	100.00%
Total votes		1,637	100.00%
Democratic gain from Republican			

=== District 86 ===
Democratic primary results
Party	Candidate	Votes	%
Democratic	Robert F. Kelly	997	54.27%
Democratic	Rudy McCormick	840	45.73%
Total votes		1,837	100.00%

General election results
Party	Candidate	Votes	%
Democratic	Robert F. Kelly	1,538	100.00%
Total votes		1,538	100.00%
Democratic gain from Republican			

=== District 87 ===
Democratic primary results
Party	Candidate	Votes	%
Democratic	John "J.D." Lynch (incumbent)	1,522	100.00%
Total votes		1,522	100.00%

General election results
Party	Candidate	Votes	%
Democratic	John "J.D." Lynch (incumbent)	1,797	100.00%
Total votes		1,797	100.00%
Democratic hold			

=== District 88 ===
Democratic primary results
Party	Candidate	Votes	%
Democratic	Jerry V. Lombardi (incumbent)	1,142	50.04%
Democratic	Robert J. "Bob" Harper (incumbent)	1,140	49.96%
Total votes		2,282	100.00%

General election results
Party	Candidate	Votes	%
Democratic	Robert J. "Bob" Harper (incumbent)	1,531	92.68%
Independent	Calla Shea	121	7.32%
Total votes		1,652	100.00%
Democratic hold			

=== District 89 ===
Democratic primary results
Party	Candidate	Votes	%
Democratic	Joe F. Kanduch Sr.	732	47.78%
Democratic	Frank J. Jurcich	588	38.38%
Democratic	Donald R. Smith	212	13.84%
Total votes		1,532	100.00%

General election results
Party	Candidate	Votes	%
Democratic	Joe F. Kanduch Sr.	1,411	100.00%
Total votes		1,411	100.00%
Democratic gain from Republican			

=== District 90 ===
Democratic primary results
Party	Candidate	Votes	%
Democratic	William "Red" Menahan (incumbent)	1,488	60.98%
Democratic	Albert E. Kosena (incumbent)	952	39.02%
Total votes		2,440	100.00%

General election results
Party	Candidate	Votes	%
Democratic	William "Red" Menahan (incumbent)	2,242	100.00%
Total votes		2,242	100.00%
Democratic hold			

=== District 91 ===
Democratic primary results
Party	Candidate	Votes	%
Democratic	John Brian Driscoll (incumbent)	1,024	100.00%
Total votes		1,024	100.00%

Republican primary results
Party	Candidate	Votes	%
Republican	Dave Huls	975	100.00%
Total votes		975	100.00%

General election results
Party	Candidate	Votes	%
Democratic	John Brian Driscoll (incumbent)	2,059	58.71%
Republican	Dave Huls	1,448	41.29%
Total votes		3,507	100.00%
Democratic hold			

=== District 92 ===
Democratic primary results
Party	Candidate	Votes	%
Democratic	Sam Wolfe	764	100.00%
Total votes		764	100.00%

Republican primary results
Party	Candidate	Votes	%
Republican	C. Thornton Mann (incumbent)	932	100.00%
Total votes		932	100.00%

General election results
Party	Candidate	Votes	%
Democratic	Sam Wolfe	1,774	53.77%
Republican	C. Thornton Mann (incumbent)	1,525	46.23%
Total votes		3,299	100.00%
Democratic gain from Republican			

=== District 93 ===
Democratic primary results
Party	Candidate	Votes	%
Democratic	Daphne Bugbee	839	59.59%
Democratic	Clarence A. Nelson	392	27.84%
Democratic	Chris Murphy	177	12.57%
Total votes		1,408	100.00%

Republican primary results
Party	Candidate	Votes	%
Republican	Howard L. Ellis	256	72.52%
Republican	Daniel John Masse	97	27.48%
Total votes		353	100.00%

General election results
Party	Candidate	Votes	%
Republican	Howard L. Ellis	1,508	53.46%
Democratic	Daphne Bugbee	1,313	46.54%
Total votes		2,821	100.00%
Republican gain from Democratic			

=== District 94 ===
Democratic primary results
Party	Candidate	Votes	%
Democratic	Gary Niles Kimble (incumbent)	799	100.00%
Total votes		799	100.00%

Republican primary results
Party	Candidate	Votes	%
Republican	Thomas E. "Tom" Christie	205	100.00%
Total votes		205	100.00%

General election results
Party	Candidate	Votes	%
Democratic	Gary Niles Kimble (incumbent)	1,301	59.16%
Republican	Thomas E. "Tom" Christie	898	40.84%
Total votes		2,199	100.00%
Democratic hold			

=== District 95 ===
Democratic primary results
Party	Candidate	Votes	%
Democratic	Ann Mary Dussault	514	36.61%
Democratic	Dan Norman	464	33.05%
Democratic	Bob Campbell	426	30.34%
Total votes		1,404	100.00%

Republican primary results
Party	Candidate	Votes	%
Republican	George N. Patterson	161	100.00%
Total votes		161	100.00%

General election results
Party	Candidate	Votes	%
Democratic	Ann Mary Dussault	1,752	75.55%
Republican	George N. Patterson	567	24.45%
Total votes		2,319	100.00%
Democratic gain from Republican			

=== District 96 ===
Democratic primary results
Party	Candidate	Votes	%
Democratic	Bob Palmer	567	48.84%
Democratic	Nancy Allison St. John	350	30.15%
Democratic	Thomas G. Patterson	244	21.02%
Total votes		1,161	100.00%

Republican primary results
Party	Candidate	Votes	%
Republican	Leroy F. Berven	202	100.00%
Total votes		202	100.00%

General election results
Party	Candidate	Votes	%
Democratic	Bob Palmer	1,633	71.50%
Republican	Leroy F. Berven	651	28.50%
Total votes		2,284	100.00%
Democratic gain from Republican			

=== District 97 ===
Democratic primary results
Party	Candidate	Votes	%
Democratic	Duane Johnson	569	57.77%
Democratic	Alfred J. Sampson	416	42.23%
Total votes		985	100.00%

Republican primary results
Party	Candidate	Votes	%
Republican	Elvin "Smitty" Smith	85	53.46%
Republican	Hurly Carey	74	46.54%
Total votes		159	100.00%

General election results
Party	Candidate	Votes	%
Democratic	Duane Johnson	1,377	72.36%
Republican	Elvin "Smitty" Smith	526	27.64%
Total votes		1,903	100.00%
Democratic gain from Republican			

=== District 98 ===
Democratic primary results
Party	Candidate	Votes	%
Democratic	Gary Marbut (incumbent)	839	100.00%
Total votes		839	100.00%

Republican primary results
Party	Candidate	Votes	%
Republican	R. Budd Gould	246	100.00%
Total votes		246	100.00%

General election results
Party	Candidate	Votes	%
Republican	R. Budd Gould	1,196	53.08%
Democratic	Gary Marbut (incumbent)	1,057	46.92%
Total votes		2,253	100.00%
Republican gain from Democratic			

=== District 99 ===
Democratic primary results
Party	Candidate	Votes	%
Democratic	Roy E. Burditt	673	58.12%
Democratic	Douglas Frandsen	485	41.88%
Total votes		1,158	100.00%

Republican primary results
Party	Candidate	Votes	%
Republican	Earl C. Lory	393	58.83%
Republican	Wanda Alsaker	275	41.17%
Total votes		668	100.00%

General election results
Party	Candidate	Votes	%
Republican	Earl C. Lory	1,785	58.72%
Democratic	Roy E. Burditt	1,255	41.28%
Total votes		3,040	100.00%
Republican gain from Democratic			

=== District 100 ===
Democratic primary results
Party	Candidate	Votes	%
Democratic	Daniel Kemmis	853	100.00%
Total votes		853	100.00%

Republican primary results
Party	Candidate	Votes	%
Republican	Tom Haines (incumbent)	361	100.00%
Total votes		361	100.00%

General election results
Party	Candidate	Votes	%
Democratic	Daniel Kemmis	1,409	55.87%
Republican	Tom Haines (incumbent)	1,113	44.13%
Total votes		2,522	100.00%
Democratic gain from Republican			

== See also ==
- 1974 United States House of Representatives elections in Montana
- 1974 Montana Senate election
