= Christiaens =

Christiaens or Christiaans is a Dutch patronymic surname ("Christiaan's") most common in East and West Flanders. People with this name include:

- Adèle Christiaens (1909–?), Belgian fencer
- Chris Christiaens (born 1940), American (Montana) Democratic politician
- Elsje Christiaens (c.1646–1664), Danish-born murderer, executed in Amsterdam and depicted by Rembrandt
- Jeffrey Christiaens (born 1991), Belgian-born Filipino footballer
- Jo Christiaens (born 1988), Belgian football defender
- Josef Christiaens (1882–1919), Belgian engineer, racecar driver and aviator
