= Jim Courtney =

American politician (1936–2023)

Member of the Montana House of Representatives
- In office 1977–1979

Personal details
- Born: July 10, 1936
- Died: September 23, 2023 (aged 87)
- Party: Democratic
- Spouse: Ann
- Children: 2
- Education: Carroll College; Montana State University

Jim Courtney (July 10, 1936 – September 23, 2023) was an American politician. He served as a Democratic member of the Montana House of Representatives.

== Life and career ==
Jim Courtney attended Boys Central High School, Carroll College and Montana State University.

Courtney was a history and journalism teacher at Butte High School.

Courtney served in the Montana House of Representatives from 1977 to 1979.

Jim Courtney died on September 23, 2023, at the age of 87.
