= James P. Lucas =

American lawyer and politician (1927–2020)

Member of the Montana House of Representatives
- In office 1962–1974

Personal details
- Born: April 7, 1927 Worland, Wyoming, United States
- Died: April 10, 2020 (aged 93) Winter Garden, Florida, U.S.
- Party: Republican
- Education: University of Montana
- Occupation: Lawyer, politician

James P. Lucas (April 7, 1927 – April 10, 2020) was an American politician in the state of Montana. He served in the Montana House of Representatives from 1962 to 1974. In the House, Lucas served as Speaker in the 1969 and 1971 sessions, as minority leader in 1965, and majority leader in 1967. Lucas is a lawyer and alumnus of the University of Montana.
