= Joseph Tropila =

American politician

Member of the Montana Senate from the 13th district
- In office 2002 -

Personal details
- Born: May 31, 1935 (age 91) Jersey City, New Jersey
- Party: Democratic Party
- Spouse: Mary
- Education: University of Great Falls
- Occupation: Restaurant/lounge owner

Joseph S. "Joe" Tropila is a Democratic Party member of the Montana Senate, representing District 12 since 2002. Earlier he was a member of the Montana House of Representatives from 1975 through 1980, and from 1994 through 2002.
