= Francis Bardanouve =

American politician

Member of the Montana House of Representatives
- In office 1958–1994

Personal details
- Born: December 10, 1917 Harlem, Montana, U.S.
- Died: March 17, 2002 (aged 84) Havre Montana, U.S.
- Party: Democratic
- Spouse: Venus
- Occupation: rancher

Francis Bardanouve (December 10, 1917 – March 17, 2002) was an American politician in the state of Montana who served in the Montana House of Representatives from 1958 to 1994. He was Speaker pro tempore in 1975. Serving for 36 years, he is the second longest serving member of the Montana legislature.
