= Joe Brand =

American politician (1925–2003)

Joe W. Brand

Member of the Montana House of Representatives
- In office 1967–198?

Personal details
- Born: October 3, 1925 Anaconda, Montana, U.S.
- Died: May 23, 2003 (aged 77) Montana, United States
- Party: Democratic
- Spouse: Betty Thompson
- Occupation: railroad conductor

Joseph William Brand (October 3, 1925 – May 23, 2003) was an American politician in the state of Montana who served in the Montana House of Representatives. He was Speaker pro tempore in 1983 and from 1979 to 1981.
