= Pat McKittrick =

American politician

D. Patrick McKittrick

Member of the Montana House of Representatives
- In office 1970–1976

Personal details
- Born: Daniel Patrick McKittrick; September 24, 1941 (age 85) Anaconda, Montana, U.S.
- Party: Democratic
- Education: Carroll College (Montana); University of Montana
- Occupation: lawyer

Daniel Patrick McKittrick (born September 24, 1941) is an American politician in the state of Montana. He served in the Montana House of Representatives from 1970 to 1976. In 1975, he served as Speaker of the House. He is a lawyer.
