= Paul Richards (Montana politician) =

American politician

Member of the Montana House of Representatives
- In office 1975–1976

Personal details
- Born: July 27, 1954 (age 72)
- Party: Democratic
- Education: University of Montana; Evergreen State College

Paul Richards (born July 27, 1954) is an American politician. He served as a Democratic member of the Montana House of Representatives.

== Life and career ==
Richards attended the University of Montana and Evergreen State College.

Richards served in the Montana House of Representatives from 1975 to 1976.
