= Art Lund (politician) =

American politician (1920–2009)

Member of the Montana House of Representatives
- In office 1963–1980

Personal details
- Born: July 28, 1920 Silver Star, Montana, U.S.
- Died: July 5, 2009 (aged 88) Scobey, Montana, U.S.
- Party: Republican
- Spouse: Cleo
- Education: University of Montana -Missoula
- Occupation: teacher

Arthur E. Lund (July 28, 1920 – July 5, 2009) was an American politician in the state of Montana who served in the Montana House of Representatives from 1963 to 1980. He was Speaker pro tempore in 1981.
