= J. D. Lynch =

American politician (1947–2018)

President pro tempore of the Montana Senate
- In office 1991–1994

Member of the Montana Senate
- In office 1982–1999

Member of the Montana House of Representatives
- In office 1971–1978

Personal details
- Born: September 17, 1947 Butte, Montana, U.S.
- Died: July 24, 2018 (aged 70) Butte, Montana, U.S.
- Party: Democratic
- Spouse: Shannon
- Children: 2, including Jennifer
- Education: Montana State University–Northern; University of Montana Western
- Occupation: teacher, politician, lobbyist

John D. Lynch (September 17, 1947 – July 24, 2018) was an American politician in the state of Montana. He was also a teacher, retiring from that profession in 2002. Lynch served in the Montana House of Representatives from 1971 to 1978 and in the State Senate from 1982 to 1999. From 1991 to 1994, he was President pro tempore of the state Senate.
