= Mike Meloy =

American politician

Member of the Montana House of Representatives
- In office 1975–1979

Personal details
- Born: October 26, 1942 (age 84) Helena, Montana, U.S.
- Party: Democratic
- Relations: Ellen Meloy (sister-in-law)
- Children: Maile Meloy; Colin Meloy
- Education: University of California at Riverside; University of Montana
- Occupation: Lawyer

Peter Michael Meloy (born October 26, 1942) is an American politician in the state of Montana. He served in the Montana House of Representatives from 1975 to 1979. In 1977, he served as majority leader of the House. He is a lawyer.
