= Betty Babcock =

American politician

Betty Lee Babcock

First Lady of Montana
- In role January 25, 1962 – January 6, 1969
- Governor: Tim Babcock
- Preceded by: Maxine Trotter Nutter
- Succeeded by: Margaret Evelyn Samson Anderson

Montana Constitutional Convention delegate
- In office 1972–1972

Personal details
- Born: March 11, 1922 Aplington, Iowa, U.S.
- Died: August 4, 2013 (aged 91) Helena, Montana, U.S.
- Party: Republican
- Spouse: Tim M. Babcock (1941-2013) (her death)

Betty Lee Babcock (March 11, 1922 – August 4, 2013) was an American politician and businesswoman who served as the first lady of Montana from 1962 to 1969 as the wife of the Governor Tim Babcock. A member of the Republican Party, she served as a delegate to the 1972 Montana Constitutional Convention and as a member of Montana House of Representatives from 1975 to 1977.

== Early life ==
Born in Aplington, Iowa, on March 11, 1922, Babcock moved to Montana in 1926. She attended Dawson County Junior College. On September 21, 1941, she married Tim M. Babcock, who subsequently joined her father's trucking business, which later became: Babcock & Lee.

== Career ==
In 1962, Babcock assumed the role of Montana's first lady when her husband, then lieutenant governor, became governor following the death of Donald Nutter. Following her time as first lady, from 1969 to 1971, Babcock served as the director of the Helena Chamber of Commerce. In 1970, the Babcocks launched the Colonial Inn in Helena, with Betty taking on the role of manager. Betty Babcock was elected to and served in the Montana Constitutional Convention of 1972, where she was one of 100 delegates tasked with drafting a new Montana Constitution. Beginning in 1975, she served in the Montana House of Representatives as a Republican. In 1978, Babcock and her husband wrote 'Challenges: Above & Beyond.' Babcock served as chair of the Montana Capitol Restoration Foundation.

== Death and legacy ==
Babcock died in Helena, Montana on August 4, 2013, at the age of 91. Governor Steve Bullock ordered all U.S. and state flags in Montana to fly at half staff until August 8 in her memory.
