= William Menahan =

American politician

William Thomas "Red" Menahan (August 16, 1935 – July 26, 2014) was an American educator.

Born in Anaconda, Montana, Menahan went to Western Montana College and then received his bachelor's degree from Carroll College in Montana. He then taught high school and was a high school football and basketball coach. He served in the Montana House of Representatives as a Democrat from 1970 to 2000. He died in Anaconda, Montana.
