= Hal Jacobson =

American politician (born 1950)

Member of the Montana House of Representatives from the 82nd district
- In office 2000 -

Personal details
- Born: November 19, 1950 (age 75) Helena, Montana
- Party: Democratic Party
- Spouse: Mary
- Education: Carroll College
- Occupation: Office administrator

Hal Jacobson is a Democratic Party member of the Montana House of Representatives, representing District 82 since 2000.

== Birth ==
Hal Jacobson was born on 19 November 1950 in Helena, Montana.

== Religion ==
Hal Jacobson is part of the Episcopalian religion.

== Family ==
Hal Jacobson is married to Mary.

== Education ==
Jaconson received his BA at Carroll College in 1977.

== Experience ==
=== Political experience ===
Jacobson has had the following political experience:

- Representative, Montana State House of Representatives, 2000–2008.

=== Professional Experience ===
Jacobson has had the following professional experience:

- Office Administrator, Hester/Jacobson, 1980-2006

== Caucuses/Non-Legislative Committees ==
Jacobson has been a part of the following committees:

- Board Member, Gateway Economic Development, 2004–present
- State Capitol Advisory Group, 1997–present
- Council Member, United States Forest Service Resource Advisory Board, 2006
- Board Member, Montana Vocational Education Council, 1986-1988
