= Chris Christiaens =

American politician (born 1940)

B. F. "Chris" Christiaens

Member of the Montana State Senate
- In office 1983–1986
- In office 1991–2002

Personal details
- Born: March 7, 1940 (age 86) Conrad, Montana, U.S.
- Party: Democratic
- Education: University of Great Falls
- Occupation: businessman

Bernard F. "Chris" Christiaens (born March 7, 1940) is an American politician in the state of Montana. He served in the Montana State Senate from 1983 to 1986 and 1991 to 2002.
