= Joseph M. Magone =

American politician

Member of the Montana House of Representatives
- In office 1974–???

Personal details
- Born: June 14, 1923 Bellingham, Washington, U.S.
- Died: October 8, 2022 (aged 99)
- Party: Democratic

Joseph M. Magone (June 14, 1923 – October 8, 2022) was an American politician. He served as a Democratic member of the Montana House of Representatives.

== Life and career ==
Magone was born in Bellingham, Washington. He attended Superior High School.

In 1974, Magone was elected to the Montana House of Representatives.

Magone died on October 8, 2022, at the age of 99.
