= 1980 Montana Senate election =

- November 4, 1980

25 of the 50 seats in the Montana Senate 26 seats needed for a majority
	Majority party	Minority party
	Rep	Dem
Leader	William L. Mathers (retired)	Chet Blaylock
Party	Republican	Democratic
Leader's seat	26th-Miles City	35th-Laurel
Last election	26	24
Seats before	27 (Note: After being re-elected in district 14 in 1978 as a Democrat, Senator John E. Manley changed political party affiliation in 1979 to Republican.)	23
Seats after	29	21
Seat change	▲2	▼2
Senate President before election
William L. Mathers
Republican
Elected Senate President
Jean A. Turnage
Republican

The 1980 Montana Senate election took place on November 4, 1980, with the primary election held on June 3, 1980. Montana voters elected 25 of the 50 members of the Montana Senate. The election coincided with United States national elections and Montana state elections, including U.S. President, U.S. House, Montana Governor, and Montana House.

Following the previous election in 1978, Republicans held a 26-to-24 seat majority over Democrats. Additionally, after being re-elected in 1978 as a Democrat, Senator John E. Manley of district 14 switched political party affiliation in 1979 to Republican, increasing the GOP's majority to 27 seats.

Republicans increased their majority in the legislature to 29 seats, while Democrats held 21—giving Republicans a net gain of two seats. The newly elected members served in the 47th Montana State Legislature, during which Republican Jean A. Turnage was elected President of the Montana Senate.

== Retiring incumbents ==
=== Democrats ===
1. District 27: Cornie R. Thiessen
2. District 45: John "Sandy" Mehrens
3. District 49: Robert D. Watt

=== Republicans ===
1. District 16: A. T. "Tom" Rasmussen
2. District 26: William L. Mathers
3. District 32: Lloyd C. Lockrem Jr.
4. District 33: William R. "Bill" Lowe
5. District 39: Everett R. Lensink

== Incumbents defeated in primary election ==
=== Democrats ===
1. District 8: Richard G. Smith
2. District 17: Larry Fasbender

== Incumbents defeated in general election ==
=== Democrat ===
1. District 3: Greg Jergeson

=== Republican ===
1. District 21: George F. Roskie

== Summary of results ==
Italics denote an open seat held by the incumbent party; bold text denotes a gain for a party. Only districts that held elections are listed below.

State senate district	Incumbent	Party	Elected senator	Outcome
1	Ed B. Smith	Rep	Ed B. Smith	Rep hold
2	Mark Etchart	Rep	Mark Etchart	Rep hold
3	Greg Jergeson	Dem	**H. W. "Swede" Hammond**	**Rep gain**
8	Richard G. Smith	Dem	**Roger H. Elliott**	**Rep gain**
10	Bob Brown	Rep	Bob Brown	Rep hold
12	George McCallum	Rep	George McCallum	Rep hold
13	Jean A. Turnage	Rep	Jean A. Turnage	Rep hold
16	A. T. "Tom" Rasmussen	Rep	**Joseph P. Mazurek**	**Dem gain**
17	Larry Fasbender	Dem	**Gary P. Lee**	**Rep gain**
20	Bill Thomas	Dem	Bill Thomas	Dem hold
21	George F. Roskie	Rep	**Harry K. Berg**	**Dem gain**
24	Harold L. Dover	Rep	Harold L. Dover	Rep hold
26	William L. Mathers	Rep	J. Donald Ochsner	Rep hold
27	Cornie R. Thiessen	Dem	**Larry John Tveit**	**Rep gain**
29	Carroll Graham	Dem	Carroll Graham	Dem hold
30	Tom Hager	Rep	Tom Hager	Rep hold
32	Lloyd C. Lockrem Jr.	Rep	Thomas F. Keating	Rep hold
33	William R. "Bill" Lowe	Rep	Bruce D. Crippen	Rep hold
39	Everett R. Lensink	Rep	**Dorothy Eck**	**Dem gain**
41	Frank W. Hazelbaker	Rep	Frank W. Hazelbaker	Rep hold
42	Robert R. "Bob" Peterson	Dem	Robert R. "Bob" Peterson	Dem hold
43	Lawrence G. Stimatz	Dem	Lawrence G. Stimatz	Dem hold
45	John "Sandy" Mehrens	Dem	Jack Haffey	Dem hold
49	Robert D. Watt	Dem	**Jan Johnson**	**Rep gain**
50	Fred Van Valkenburg	Dem	Fred Van Valkenburg	Dem hold

== Detailed results by district ==
=== District 1 ===
Republican primary results
Party	Candidate	Votes	%
Republican	Ed B. Smith (incumbent)	1,341	100.00%
Total votes		1,341	100.00%

General election results
Party	Candidate	Votes	%
Republican	Ed B. Smith (incumbent)	5,611	100.00%
Total votes		5,611	100.00%
Republican hold			

=== District 2 ===
Democratic primary results
Party	Candidate	Votes	%
Democratic	Ernest Kummerfeldt	1,915	100.00%
Total votes		1,915	100.00%

Republican primary results
Party	Candidate	Votes	%
Republican	Mark Etchart (incumbent)	1,190	100.00%
Total votes		1,190	100.00%

General election results
Party	Candidate	Votes	%
Republican	Mark Etchart (incumbent)	3,431	54.47%
Democratic	Ernest Kummerfeldt	2,868	45.53%
Total votes		6,299	100.00%
Republican hold			

=== District 3 ===
Democratic primary results
Party	Candidate	Votes	%
Democratic	Greg Jergeson (incumbent)	1,969	100.00%
Total votes		1,969	100.00%

Republican primary results
Party	Candidate	Votes	%
Republican	H. W. Hammond	1,182	100.00%
Total votes		1,182	100.00%

General election results
Party	Candidate	Votes	%
Republican	H. W. "Swede" Hammond	3,472	53.37%
Democratic	Greg Jergeson (incumbent)	3,034	46.63%
Total votes		6,506	100.00%
Republican gain from Democratic			

=== District 8 ===
Democratic primary results
Party	Candidate	Votes	%
Democratic	Edwin O. Woster	1,245	55.83%
Democratic	Richard G. Smith (incumbent)	985	44.17%
Total votes		2,230	100.00%

Republican primary results
Party	Candidate	Votes	%
Republican	Roger H. Elliott	1,568	100.00%
Total votes		1,568	100.00%

General election results
Party	Candidate	Votes	%
Republican	Roger H. Elliott	4,981	59.61%
Democratic	Edwin O. Woster	3,375	40.39%
Total votes		8,356	100.00%
Republican gain from Democratic			

=== District 10 ===
Republican primary results
Party	Candidate	Votes	%
Republican	Bob Brown (incumbent)	1,601	100.00%
Total votes		1,601	100.00%

General election results
Party	Candidate	Votes	%
Republican	Bob Brown (incumbent)	6,843	100.00%
Total votes		6,843	100.00%
Republican hold			

=== District 12 ===
Democratic primary results
Party	Candidate	Votes	%
Democratic	Larry Sturm	2,222	100.00%
Total votes		2,222	100.00%

Republican primary results
Party	Candidate	Votes	%
Republican	George McCallum (incumbent)	1,821	100.00%
Total votes		1,821	100.00%

General election results
Party	Candidate	Votes	%
Republican	George McCallum (incumbent)	5,926	69.86%
Democratic	Larry Sturm	2,557	30.14%
Total votes		8,483	100.00%
Republican hold			

=== District 13 ===
Republican primary results
Party	Candidate	Votes	%
Republican	Jean A. Turnage (incumbent)	2,105	100.00%
Total votes		2,105	100.00%

General election results
Party	Candidate	Votes	%
Republican	Jean A. Turnage (incumbent)	6,791	100.00%
Total votes		6,791	100.00%
Republican hold			

=== District 16 ===
Democratic primary results
Party	Candidate	Votes	%
Democratic	Joseph P. Mazurek	1,817	63.60%
Democratic	John W. Mahan	1,040	36.40%
Total votes		2,857	100.00%

Republican primary results
Party	Candidate	Votes	%
Republican	Douglas B. Kelley (Note: Although Douglas B. Kelley won the primary, Bob McKay was the Republican nominee in the general election.)	469	57.69%
Republican	Riley Johnson	344	42.31%
Total votes		813	100.00%

General election results
Party	Candidate	Votes	%
Democratic	Joseph P. Mazurek	4,393	63.12%
Republican	Bob McKay	2,567	36.88%
Total votes		6,960	100.00%
Democratic gain from Republican			

=== District 17 ===
Democratic primary results
Party	Candidate	Votes	%
Democratic	Walter H. Savoy	1,215	52.62%
Democratic	Larry Fasbender (incumbent)	1,094	47.38%
Total votes		2,309	100.00%

Republican primary results
Party	Candidate	Votes	%
Republican	Gary P. Lee	500	100.00%
Total votes		500	100.00%

General election results
Party	Candidate	Votes	%
Republican	Gary P. Lee	3,198	57.03%
Democratic	Walter H. Savoy	2,410	42.97%
Total votes		5,608	100.00%
Republican gain from Democratic			

=== District 20 ===
Democratic primary results
Party	Candidate	Votes	%
Democratic	Bill Thomas (incumbent)	1,301	100.00%
Total votes		1,301	100.00%

General election results
Party	Candidate	Votes	%
Democratic	Bill Thomas (incumbent)	3,317	100.00%
Total votes		3,317	100.00%
Democratic hold			

=== District 21 ===
Democratic primary results
Party	Candidate	Votes	%
Democratic	Harry K. Berg	965	50.47%
Democratic	John F. Kenny	947	49.53%
Total votes		1,912	100.00%

Republican primary results
Party	Candidate	Votes	%
Republican	George F. Roskie (incumbent)	574	100.00%
Total votes		574	100.00%

General election results
Party	Candidate	Votes	%
Democratic	Harry K. Berg	2,742	50.18%
Republican	George F. Roskie (incumbent)	2,722	49.82%
Total votes		5,464	100.00%
Democratic gain from Republican			

=== District 24 ===
Democratic primary results
Party	Candidate	Votes	%
Democratic	Edward B. "Ed" Butcher	2,114	100.00%
Total votes		2,114	100.00%

Republican primary results
Party	Candidate	Votes	%
Republican	Harold L. Dover (incumbent)	1,931	100.00%
Total votes		1,931	100.00%

General election results
Party	Candidate	Votes	%
Republican	Harold L. Dover (incumbent)	3,999	51.01%
Democratic	Edward B. "Ed" Butcher	3,841	48.99%
Total votes		7,840	100.00%
Republican hold			

=== District 26 ===
Democratic primary results
Party	Candidate	Votes	%
Democratic	Robert G. "Bob" Barthelmess	1,673	100.00%
Total votes		1,673	100.00%

Republican primary results
Party	Candidate	Votes	%
Republican	J. Donald Ochsner	1,095	60.60%
Republican	Lyman W. Choate	712	39.40%
Total votes		1,807	100.00%

General election results
Party	Candidate	Votes	%
Republican	J. Donald Ochsner	3,428	50.07%
Democratic	Robert G. "Bob" Barthelmess	3,419	49.93%
Total votes		6,847	100.00%
Republican hold			

=== District 27 ===
Democratic primary results
Party	Candidate	Votes	%
Democratic	Harold L. Mercer	1,246	60.75%
Democratic	Richard Buehler	805	39.25%
Total votes		2,051	100.00%

Republican primary results
Party	Candidate	Votes	%
Republican	Larry John Tveit	1,196	100.00%
Total votes		1,196	100.00%

General election results
Party	Candidate	Votes	%
Republican	Larry John Tveit	3,576	49.20%
Democratic	Harold L. Mercer	3,085	42.45%
Independent	Gene Delaney	607	8.35%
Total votes		7,268	100.00%
Republican gain from Democratic			

=== District 29 ===
Democratic primary results
Party	Candidate	Votes	%
Democratic	Carroll Graham (incumbent)	1,278	100.00%
Total votes		1,278	100.00%

General election results
Party	Candidate	Votes	%
Democratic	Carroll Graham (incumbent)	4,064	100.00%
Total votes		4,064	100.00%
Democratic hold			

=== District 30 ===
Democratic primary results
Party	Candidate	Votes	%
Democratic	Duane E. Christensen	1,814	100.00%
Total votes		1,814	100.00%

Republican primary results
Party	Candidate	Votes	%
Republican	Tom Hager (incumbent)	1,907	100.00%
Total votes		1,907	100.00%

General election results
Party	Candidate	Votes	%
Republican	Tom Hager (incumbent)	5,991	59.36%
Democratic	Duane E. Christensen	4,101	40.64%
Total votes		10,092	100.00%
Republican hold			

=== District 32 ===
Democratic primary results
Party	Candidate	Votes	%
Democratic	Sally M. M. Jordan	993	100.00%
Total votes		993	100.00%

Republican primary results
Party	Candidate	Votes	%
Republican	Thomas F. Keating	1,966	60.09%
Republican	Antoinette "Toni" Fraser Rosell	1,306	39.91%
Total votes		3,272	100.00%

General election results
Party	Candidate	Votes	%
Republican	Thomas F. Keating	6,429	75.65%
Democratic	Sally M. M. Jordan	2,069	24.35%
Total votes		8,498	100.00%
Republican hold			

=== District 33 ===
Democratic primary results
Party	Candidate	Votes	%
Democratic	Norm Schoenthal	1,049	100.00%
Total votes		1,049	100.00%

Republican primary results
Party	Candidate	Votes	%
Republican	Howard C. Porter (Note: Although Howard C. Porter won the primary, Bruce D. Crippen was the Republican nominee in the general election.)	1,562	100.00%
Total votes		1,562	100.00%

General election results
Party	Candidate	Votes	%
Republican	Bruce D. Crippen	4,292	66.99%
Democratic	Norm Schoenthal	2,115	33.01%
Total votes		6,407	100.00%
Republican hold			

=== District 39 ===
Democratic primary results
Party	Candidate	Votes	%
Democratic	Dorothy Eck	1,049	100.00%
Total votes		1,049	100.00%

Republican primary results
Party	Candidate	Votes	%
Republican	Joyce O. Sandquist	777	52.93%
Republican	Edmund P. Sedivy Sr.	691	47.07%
Total votes		1,468	100.00%

General election results
Party	Candidate	Votes	%
Democratic	Dorothy Eck	3,371	52.15%
Republican	Joyce O. Sandquist	3,093	47.85%
Total votes		6,464	100.00%
Democratic gain from Republican			

=== District 41 ===
Republican primary results
Party	Candidate	Votes	%
Republican	Frank W. Hazelbaker (incumbent)	2,100	100.00%
Total votes		2,100	100.00%

General election results
Party	Candidate	Votes	%
Republican	Frank W. Hazelbaker (incumbent)	4,622	66.66%
Independent	Douglas Allen	2,312	33.34%
Total votes		6,934	100.00%
Republican hold			

=== District 42 ===
Democratic primary results
Party	Candidate	Votes	%
Democratic	Robert R. "Bob" Peterson (incumbent)	2,807	100.00%
Total votes		2,807	100.00%

General election results
Party	Candidate	Votes	%
Democratic	Robert R. "Bob" Peterson (incumbent)	5,073	100.00%
Total votes		5,073	100.00%
Democratic hold			

=== District 43 ===
Democratic primary results
Party	Candidate	Votes	%
Democratic	Lawrence G. Stimatz (incumbent)	2,061	57.86%
Democratic	Bob Kelly	1,501	42.14%
Total votes		3,562	100.00%

General election results
Party	Candidate	Votes	%
Democratic	Lawrence G. Stimatz (incumbent)	4,308	100.00%
Total votes		4,308	100.00%
Democratic hold			

=== District 45 ===
Democratic primary results
Party	Candidate	Votes	%
Democratic	Jack Haffey	1,403	36.60%
Democratic	Peter "Pete" Lorello	873	22.78%
Democratic	Francis E. "Tiny" Sullivan	779	20.32%
Democratic	Ron Weaver	778	20.30%
Total votes		3,833	100.00%

General election results
Party	Candidate	Votes	%
Democratic	Jack Haffey	3,826	100.00%
Total votes		3,826	100.00%
Democratic hold			

=== District 49 ===
Democratic primary results
Party	Candidate	Votes	%
Democratic	Terry Knight	1,188	53.80%
Democratic	Sharon Solomon	1,020	46.20%
Total votes		2,208	100.00%

Republican primary results
Party	Candidate	Votes	%
Republican	Jan Johnson	776	100.00%
Total votes		776	100.00%

General election results
Party	Candidate	Votes	%
Republican	Jan Johnson	3,292	51.84%
Democratic	Terry Knight	3,058	48.16%
Total votes		6,350	100.00%
Republican gain from Democratic			

=== District 50 ===
Democratic primary results
Party	Candidate	Votes	%
Democratic	Fred Van Valkenburg (incumbent)	2,609	100.00%
Total votes		2,609	100.00%

Republican primary results
Party	Candidate	Votes	%
Republican	John Hamp	1,447	100.00%
Total votes		1,447	100.00%

General election results
Party	Candidate	Votes	%
Democratic	Fred Van Valkenburg (incumbent)	4,760	54.91%
Republican	John Hamp	3,909	45.09%
Total votes		8,669	100.00%
Democratic hold			

== See also ==
- 1980 United States presidential election in Montana
- 1980 United States House of Representatives elections in Montana
- 1980 Montana gubernatorial election
- 1980 Montana House of Representatives election
