= 1974 Montana Senate election =

- November 5, 1974

All 50 seats in the Montana Senate 26 seats needed for a majority
	Majority party	Minority party
Leader	W. Gordon McOmber	Jim Moore (retired)
Party	Democratic	Republican
Leader's seat	6th-Fairfield	9th-Two Dot
Last election	27	23
Seats after	30	20
Seat change	▲3	▼3
Senate President before election
W. Gordon McOmber
Democratic
Elected Senate President
W. Gordon McOmber
Democratic

The 1974 Montana Senate election took place on November 5, 1974, with the primary election held on June 4, 1974. Montana voters elected all 50 members of the Montana Senate. Following the landmark Reynolds v. Sims (1964) US Supreme Court decision, every state had to redraw state electoral districts to be approximately equal in population. Before Reynolds, the Montana Senate consisted of 50 members from a mix of single- and multi-member districts. After the ruling, the Montana Senate had to shift to equally populated electoral districts. In 1972, the voters of Montana ratified the current Constitution of Montana, establishing the structure of the state senate that is still used today: 50 senators each elected from a single-member district. To stagger state senate terms, senators elected in 1974 were split into two groups: half served just two years and faced re-election in 1976; the other half served full four-year terms and ran again in 1978. This setup made sure not all senate seats were up for election at once.

The election coincided with United States national elections and Montana state elections, including U.S. House and Montana House.

Following the previous election in 1972, Democrats held a 27-to-23-seat majority over Republicans. Democrats increased their majority in the legislature to 30 seats, while Republicans held 20—giving Democrats a net gain of three seats. The newly elected members served in the 44th Montana State Legislature, during which Democrat W. Gordon McOmber was re-elected President of the Montana Senate.

== Retiring incumbents ==
=== Democrats ===
1. District 4: Gordon E. Bollinger
2. District 4: Stanley Nees
3. District 5: B. J. “Swede” Goodheart
4. District 13: William H. Bertsche
5. District 13: P. J. Gilfeather
6. District 13: Mrs. John Nelson Hall
7. District 13: John K. “Jack” McDonald
8. District 14: David F. James
9. District 16: George Siderius
10. District 19: P. J. Keenan
11. District 19: Luke McKeon
12. District 20: James R. “Jimmy” Shea
13. District 20: Leonard E. Vainio
14. District 23: Arthur N. Jensen

=== Republicans ===
1. District 8: Archie M. Cochrane
2. District 8: Herbert J. Klindt
3. District 8: William R. McNamer
4. District 9: Jim Moore
5. District 11: J. W. “Brick” Breeden
6. District 12: George T. Bennett
7. District 12: James T. "Tom" Harrison Jr.
8. District 18: G. W. “Por” Deschamps

== Incumbent defeated in primary election ==
=== Republican ===
1. District 32: George Darrow (Note: Redistricted from district 8 to 32, then lost to fellow Republican Antoinette "Toni" Fraser Rosell in the primary.)

== Incumbents defeated in general election ==
=== Democrats ===
1. District 5: Gordon McGowan (Note: Redistricted from district 14 to 5, then lost re-election.)
2. District 7: Percy DeWolfe (Note: Redistricted from district 15 to 7, then lost re-election.)
3. District 21: C. F. “Smokey” Sorensen (Note: Redistricted from district 13 to 21, then lost re-election. The nickname is listed as "Smokey" (with "e") on primary election returns but "Smoky" (without "e") on general election returns.)
4. District 28: A. A. Zody (Note: Redistricted from district 3 to 28, then lost re-election.)

=== Republicans ===
1. District 8: Fred O. Broeder (Note: Redistricted from district 16 to 8, then lost re-election.)
2. District 24: Earl Moritz (Note: Redistricted from district 10 to 24, then lost re-election.)
3. District 33: William R. “Bill” Lowe (Note: Redistricted from district 8 to 33, then lost re-election.)
4. District 47: Harry T. Northey (Note: Redistricted from district 18 to 47, then lost re-election.)
5. District 50: Fred G. Carl (Note: Redistricted from district 18 to 50, then lost re-election.)

== Summary of results ==
Italics denote an open seat held by the incumbent party; bold text denotes a gain for a party.

State senate district	Incumbent	Party	Elected senator	Outcome
1	Carroll A. Graham (Note: Redistricted from district 1 to 29.)	Dem	**Edward B. Smith**	**Rep gain**
2	William L. Mathers (Note: Redistricted from district 2 to 26.)	Rep	Mark Etchart	Rep hold
3	Cornie R. Thiessen (Note: Redistricted from district 3 to 27.)	Dem	Greg Jergeson	Dem hold
3	A. A. Zody	Dem	Greg Jergeson	Dem hold
4	Gordon E. Bollinger	Dem	**Stan Stephens**	**Rep gain**
4	Stanley Nees	Dem	**Stan Stephens**	**Rep gain**
5	B. J. “Swede” Goodheart	Dem	**Allen C. Kolstad**	**Rep gain**
6	Dave Manning (Note: Redistricted from district 6 to 25.)	Dem	W. Gordon McOmber (Note: Redistricted from district 15 to 6.)	Dem hold
7	L. M. “Larry” Aber (Note: Redistricted from district 7 to 36.)	Rep	**Harold C. Nelson**	**Rep gain**
8	Archie M. Cochrane	Rep	**Richard G. Smith**	**Dem gain**
8	George Darrow	Rep	**Richard G. Smith**	**Dem gain**
8	Herbert J. Klindt	Rep	**Richard G. Smith**	**Dem gain**
8	William R. “Bill” Lowe	Rep	**Richard G. Smith**	**Dem gain**
8	William R. McNamer	Rep	**Richard G. Smith**	**Dem gain**
8	Antoinette "Toni" Fraser Rosell (Note: Redistricted from district 8 to 32.)	Rep	**Richard G. Smith**	**Dem gain**
9	Jim Moore	Rep	Matt Himsl (Note: Redistricted from district 16 to 9.)	Rep hold
10	Earl Moritz	Rep	Robert J. "Bob" Brown	Rep hold
11	Paul F. Boylan (Note: Redistricted from district 11 to 38.)	Dem	Joe R. Roberts	Dem hold
11	J. W. “Brick” Breeden	Rep	Joe R. Roberts	Dem hold
11	Peter R. Story (Note: Redistricted from district 11 to 37.)	Rep	Joe R. Roberts	Dem hold
12	George T. Bennett	Rep	George McCallum (Note: Redistricted from district 23 to 12.)	Rep hold
12	Glen L. Drake (Note: Redistricted from district 12 to 16.)	Rep	George McCallum	Rep hold
12	James T. "Tom" Harrison Jr.	Rep	George McCallum	Rep hold
13	William H. Bertsche	Dem	**Jean A. Turnage** (Note: Redistricted from district 17 to 13.)	**Rep gain**
13	John W. “Jack” Devine (Note: Redistricted from district 13 to 19.)	Dem	**Jean A. Turnage**	**Rep gain**
13	P. J. Gilfeather	Dem	**Jean A. Turnage**	**Rep gain**
13	Mrs. John Nelson Hall	Dem	**Jean A. Turnage**	**Rep gain**
13	John K. “Jack” McDonald	Dem	**Jean A. Turnage**	**Rep gain**
13	C. F. “Smokey” Sorensen	Dem	**Jean A. Turnage**	**Rep gain**
14	David F. James	Dem	John E. Manley	Dem hold
14	Gordon McGowan	Dem	John E. Manley	Dem hold
15	Percy DeWolfe	Dem	**Frank Dunkle**	**Rep gain**
15	W. Gordon McOmber	Dem	**Frank Dunkle**	**Rep gain**
16	Fred O. Broeder	Rep	Glen L. Drake	Rep hold
16	Matt Himsl (Note: Republican Senator W. F. Bennett resigned in Dec. 1972 in the middle of the term. Matt Himsl (R) was appointed to fill the vacancy and took the oath of office on January 1, 1973.)	Rep	Glen L. Drake	Rep hold
16	George Siderius	Dem	Glen L. Drake	Rep hold
17	Jean A. Turnage	Rep	**Larry Fasbender**	**Dem gain**
18	Fred G. Carl	Rep	Margaret S. Warden	Dem hold
18	G. W. “Por” Deschamps	Rep	Margaret S. Warden	Dem hold
18	Elmer Flynn (Note: Redistricted from district 18 to 48.)	Dem	Margaret S. Warden	Dem hold
18	Harry T. Northey	Rep	Margaret S. Warden	Dem hold
19	P. J. Keenan	Dem	John W. “Jack” Devine	Dem hold
19	Luke McKeon	Dem	John W. “Jack” Devine	Dem hold
20	Neil J. Lynch (Note: Redistricted from district 20 to 42.)	Dem	Mike Greely	Dem hold
20	James R. “Jimmy” Shea	Dem	Mike Greely	Dem hold
20	Leonard E. Vainio	Dem	Mike Greely	Dem hold
21	Frank W. Hazelbaker (Note: Redistricted from district 21 to 41.)	Rep	**George F. Roskie**	**Rep gain**
22	Miles Romney (Note: Democratic Senator W. A. “Bill” Groff resigned in the middle of the term. Miles Romney (D) was appointed to fill the vacancy and took the oath of office on January 7, 1974.) (Note: Redistricted from district 22 to 46.)	Dem	**Pat M. Goodover**	**Rep gain**
23	Arthur N. Jensen	Dem	Jack E. Galt	Rep hold
23	George McCallum	Rep	Jack E. Galt	Rep hold
24	New district		**Donald R. Foster**	**Dem gain**
25	New district		Dave Manning	Dem hold
26	New district		William L. Mathers	Rep hold
27	New district		Cornie R. Thiessen	Dem hold
28	New district		**S. A. Olson**	**Rep gain**
29	New district		Carroll Graham	Dem hold
30	New district		**Max Conover**	**Dem gain**
31	New district		**Pat Regan**	**Dem gain**
32	New district		Antoinette "Toni" Fraser Rosell	Rep hold
33	New district		**V. E. "Gene" Cetrone**	**Dem gain**
34	New district		**Thomas E. Towe**	**Dem gain**
35	New district		**Chet Blaylock**	**Dem gain**
36	New district		L. M. “Larry” Aber	Rep hold
37	New district		Pete Story	Rep hold
38	New district		Paul F. Boylan	Dem hold
39	New district		**Ann Seibel**	**Dem gain**
40	New district		**Terry Murphy**	**Dem gain**
41	New district		Frank W. Hazelbaker	Rep hold
42	New district		Neil J. Lynch	Dem hold
43	New district		**Robert E. "Bob" Lee**	**Dem gain**
44	New district		**John E. "Jack" Healy**	**Dem gain**
45	New district		**John "Sandy" Mehrens**	**Dem gain**
46	New district		Miles Romney	Dem hold
47	New district		**Bill Norman**	**Dem gain**
48	New district		Elmer Flynn	Dem hold
49	New district		**Robert D. Watt**	**Dem gain**
50	New district		**Richard A. Colberg**	**Dem gain**

== Detailed results by district ==
=== District 1 ===
Democratic primary results
Party	Candidate	Votes	%
Democratic	Orphey "Bud" Lien	2,126	100.00%
Total votes		2,126	100.00%

Republican primary results
Party	Candidate	Votes	%
Republican	Edward B. Smith	503	100.00%
Total votes		503	100.00%

General election results
Party	Candidate	Votes	%
Republican	Edward B. Smith	3,366	64.00%
Democratic	Orphey "Bud" Lien	1,893	36.00%
Total votes		5,259	100.00%
Republican gain from Democratic			

=== District 2 ===
Democratic primary results
Party	Candidate	Votes	%
Democratic	Ralph F. Eggebrecht	1,277	100.00%
Total votes		1,277	100.00%

Republican primary results
Party	Candidate	Votes	%
Republican	Mark Etchart	1,137	100.00%
Total votes		1,137	100.00%

General election results
Party	Candidate	Votes	%
Republican	Mark Etchart	2,831	57.01%
Democratic	Ralph F. Eggebrecht	2,135	42.99%
Total votes		4,966	100.00%
Republican hold			

=== District 3 ===
Democratic primary results
Party	Candidate	Votes	%
Democratic	Greg Jergeson	902	52.44%
Democratic	Frank J. Billmayer	818	47.56%
Total votes		1,720	100.00%

Republican primary results
Party	Candidate	Votes	%
Republican	Clay H. McCartney	1,077	100.00%
Total votes		1,077	100.00%

General election results
Party	Candidate	Votes	%
Democratic	Greg Jergeson	2,688	53.40%
Republican	Clay H. McCartney	2,346	46.60%
Total votes		5,034	100.00%
Democratic hold			

=== District 4 ===
Democratic primary results
Party	Candidate	Votes	%
Democratic	Clayton R. Codden	1,603	62.91%
Democratic	John L. Gallagher	945	37.09%
Total votes		2,548	100.00%

Republican primary results
Party	Candidate	Votes	%
Republican	Stan Stephens	575	100.00%
Total votes		575	100.00%

General election results
Party	Candidate	Votes	%
Republican	Stan Stephens	2,698	60.32%
Democratic	Clayton R. Codden	1,775	39.68%
Total votes		4,473	100.00%
Republican gain from Democratic			

=== District 5 ===
Democratic primary results
Party	Candidate	Votes	%
Democratic	Gordon McGowan (incumbent)	2,452	100.00%
Total votes		2,452	100.00%

Republican primary results
Party	Candidate	Votes	%
Republican	Allen C. Kolstad	752	100.00%
Total votes		752	100.00%

General election results
Party	Candidate	Votes	%
Republican	Allen C. Kolstad	3,405	61.53%
Democratic	Gordon McGowan (incumbent)	2,129	38.47%
Total votes		5,534	100.00%
Republican gain from Democratic			

=== District 6 ===
Democratic primary results
Party	Candidate	Votes	%
Democratic	W. Gordon McOmber (incumbent)	3,249	100.00%
Total votes		3,249	100.00%

Republican primary results
Party	Candidate	Votes	%
Republican	James A. "Jim" Cheetham	992	100.00%
Total votes		992	100.00%

General election results
Party	Candidate	Votes	%
Democratic	W. Gordon McOmber (incumbent)	4,004	61.53%
Republican	James A. "Jim" Cheetham	2,503	38.47%
Total votes		6,507	100.00%
Democratic hold			

=== District 7 ===
Democratic primary results
Party	Candidate	Votes	%
Democratic	Percy DeWolfe (incumbent)	1,792	100.00%
Total votes		1,792	100.00%

Republican primary results
Party	Candidate	Votes	%
Republican	Harold C. Nelson	628	100.00%
Total votes		628	100.00%

General election results
Party	Candidate	Votes	%
Republican	Harold C. Nelson	2,305	52.78%
Democratic	Percy DeWolfe (incumbent)	2,062	47.22%
Total votes		4,367	100.00%
Republican hold			

=== District 8 ===
Democratic primary results
Party	Candidate	Votes	%
Democratic	Richard G. Smith	1,689	100.00%
Total votes		1,689	100.00%

Republican primary results
Party	Candidate	Votes	%
Republican	Fred O. Broeder (incumbent)	633	66.35%
Republican	D. Lee Fritz	189	19.81%
Republican	Leonard A. Vadala	132	13.84%
Total votes		954	100.00%

General election results
Party	Candidate	Votes	%
Democratic	Richard G. Smith	2,602	53.72%
Republican	Fred O. Broeder (incumbent)	2,242	46.28%
Total votes		4,844	100.00%
Democratic gain from Republican			

=== District 9 ===
Democratic primary results
Party	Candidate	Votes	%
Democratic	Henry "Hank" Siderius	1,545	100.00%
Total votes		1,545	100.00%

Republican primary results
Party	Candidate	Votes	%
Republican	Matt Himsl (incumbent)	1,187	100.00%
Total votes		1,187	100.00%

General election results
Party	Candidate	Votes	%
Republican	Matt Himsl (incumbent)	2,800	52.71%
Democratic	Henry "Hank" Siderius	2,512	47.29%
Total votes		5,312	100.00%
Republican hold			

=== District 10 ===
Democratic primary results
Party	Candidate	Votes	%
Democratic	William "Bill" Zimmer	1,805	100.00%
Total votes		1,805	100.00%

Republican primary results
Party	Candidate	Votes	%
Republican	Robert J. "Bob" Brown	725	100.00%
Total votes		725	100.00%

General election results
Party	Candidate	Votes	%
Republican	Robert J. "Bob" Brown	2,491	51.28%
Democratic	William "Bill" Zimmer	2,367	48.72%
Total votes		4,858	100.00%
Republican hold			

=== District 11 ===
Democratic primary results
Party	Candidate	Votes	%
Democratic	Joe R. Roberts	1,882	61.97%
Democratic	William F. Hafferman	1,155	38.03%
Total votes		3,037	100.00%

General election results
Party	Candidate	Votes	%
Democratic	Joe R. Roberts	3,440	100.00%
Total votes		3,440	100.00%
Democratic hold			

=== District 12 ===
Democratic primary results
Party	Candidate	Votes	%
Democratic	Roland H. Pedersen	1,589	64.36%
Democratic	Barton O. Wetzel	880	35.64%
Total votes		2,469	100.00%

Republican primary results
Party	Candidate	Votes	%
Republican	George McCallum (incumbent)	745	100.00%
Total votes		745	100.00%

General election results
Party	Candidate	Votes	%
Republican	George McCallum (incumbent)	3,286	55.13%
Democratic	Roland H. Pedersen	2,674	44.87%
Total votes		5,960	100.00%
Republican hold			

=== District 13 ===
Democratic primary results
Party	Candidate	Votes	%
Democratic	Leland Schoonover	1,689	100.00%
Total votes		1,689	100.00%

Republican primary results
Party	Candidate	Votes	%
Republican	Jean A. Turnage (incumbent)	1,266	100.00%
Total votes		1,266	100.00%

General election results
Party	Candidate	Votes	%
Republican	Jean A. Turnage (incumbent)	3,136	52.91%
Democratic	Leland Schoonover	2,791	47.09%
Total votes		5,927	100.00%
Republican gain from Democratic			

=== District 14 ===
Democratic primary results
Party	Candidate	Votes	%
Democratic	John E. Manley	1,316	55.36%
Democratic	Charles R. "Chuck" Allen	1,061	44.64%
Total votes		2,377	100.00%

Republican primary results
Party	Candidate	Votes	%
Republican	Ralph J. Beck	989	100.00%
Total votes		989	100.00%

General election results
Party	Candidate	Votes	%
Democratic	John E. Manley	2,680	52.28%
Republican	Ralph J. Beck	2,446	47.72%
Total votes		5,126	100.00%
Democratic hold			

=== District 15 ===
Democratic primary results
Party	Candidate	Votes	%
Democratic	Joe Reber Sr.	1,541	57.98%
Democratic	Jack R. Harper	1,117	42.02%
Total votes		2,658	100.00%

Republican primary results
Party	Candidate	Votes	%
Republican	Frank Dunkle	1,209	100.00%
Total votes		1,209	100.00%

General election results
Party	Candidate	Votes	%
Republican	Frank Dunkle	3,482	58.67%
Democratic	Joe Reber Sr.	2,453	41.33%
Total votes		5,935	100.00%
Republican gain from Democratic			

=== District 16 ===
Democratic primary results
Party	Candidate	Votes	%
Democratic	Jerry Metcalf	1,220	45.45%
Democratic	Mary Munger	1,208	45.01%
Democratic	Wayne L. Stephens	256	9.54%
Total votes		2,684	100.00%

Republican primary results
Party	Candidate	Votes	%
Republican	Glen L. Drake (incumbent)	1,126	100.00%
Total votes		1,126	100.00%

General election results
Party	Candidate	Votes	%
Republican	Glen L. Drake (incumbent)	2,895	52.33%
Democratic	Jerry Metcalf	2,637	47.67%
Total votes		5,532	100.00%
Republican hold			

=== District 17 ===
Democratic primary results
Party	Candidate	Votes	%
Democratic	Larry Fasbender	1,302	100.00%
Total votes		1,302	100.00%

Republican primary results
Party	Candidate	Votes	%
Republican	William C. Shortridge	432	100.00%
Total votes		432	100.00%

General election results
Party	Candidate	Votes	%
Democratic	Larry Fasbender	1,970	53.62%
Republican	William C. Shortridge	1,704	46.38%
Total votes		3,674	100.00%
Democratic gain from Republican			

=== District 18 ===
Democratic primary results
Party	Candidate	Votes	%
Democratic	Margaret S. Warden	1,103	100.00%
Total votes		1,103	100.00%

Republican primary results
Party	Candidate	Votes	%
Republican	Jack E. Kessner	589	100.00%
Total votes		589	100.00%

General election results
Party	Candidate	Votes	%
Democratic	Margaret S. Warden	1,820	54.39%
Republican	Jack E. Kessner	1,526	45.61%
Total votes		3,346	100.00%
Democratic hold			

=== District 19 ===
Democratic primary results
Party	Candidate	Votes	%
Democratic	John W. "Jack" Devine (incumbent)	760	58.55%
Democratic	Virginia H. Blend	538	41.45%
Total votes		1,298	100.00%

Republican primary results
Party	Candidate	Votes	%
Republican	Donald I. Osburn	244	73.94%
Republican	Milt Stringer	86	26.06%
Total votes		330	100.00%

General election results
Party	Candidate	Votes	%
Democratic	John W. "Jack" Devine (incumbent)	1,668	66.22%
Republican	Donald I. Osburn	851	33.78%
Total votes		2,519	100.00%
Democratic hold			

=== District 20 ===
Democratic primary results
Party	Candidate	Votes	%
Democratic	Mike Greely	1,221	100.00%
Total votes		1,221	100.00%

Republican primary results
Party	Candidate	Votes	%
Republican	M. F. Keller	799	100.00%
Total votes		799	100.00%

General election results
Party	Candidate	Votes	%
Democratic	Mike Greely	1,756	50.20%
Republican	M. F. Keller	1,742	49.80%
Total votes		3,498	100.00%
Democratic hold			

=== District 21 ===
Democratic primary results
Party	Candidate	Votes	%
Democratic	C. F. “Smokey” Sorensen (incumbent)	744	59.81%
Democratic	Edward J. Warren	500	40.19%
Total votes		1,244	100.00%

Republican primary results
Party	Candidate	Votes	%
Republican	George F. Roskie	705	59.39%
Republican	Marian S. Erdmann	482	40.61%
Total votes		1,187	100.00%

General election results
Party	Candidate	Votes	%
Republican	George F. Roskie	1,991	55.37%
Democratic	C. F. “Smokey” Sorensen (incumbent)	1,605	44.63%
Total votes		3,596	100.00%
Republican hold			

=== District 22 ===
Democratic primary results
Party	Candidate	Votes	%
Democratic	Raymond E. Graham	309	100.00%
Total votes		309	100.00%

Republican primary results
Party	Candidate	Votes	%
Republican	Pat M. Goodover	304	50.25%
Republican	W. L. "Bill" Holter	301	49.75%
Total votes		605	100.00%

General election results
Party	Candidate	Votes	%
Republican	Pat M. Goodover	963	68.10%
Democratic	Raymond E. Graham	451	31.90%
Total votes		1,414	100.00%
Republican gain from Democratic			

=== District 23 ===
Democratic primary results
Party	Candidate	Votes	%
Democratic	Anthony Peccia	1,613	100.00%
Total votes		1,613	100.00%

Republican primary results
Party	Candidate	Votes	%
Republican	Jack E. Galt	1,565	100.00%
Total votes		1,565	100.00%

American Party primary results
Party	Candidate	Votes	%
American	Harry Cameron	11	100.00%
Total votes		11	100.00%

General election results
Party	Candidate	Votes	%
Republican	Jack E. Galt	3,206	52.89%
Democratic	Anthony Peccia	2,494	41.14%
American	Harry Cameron	362	5.97%
Total votes		6,062	100.00%
Republican hold			

=== District 24 ===
Democratic primary results
Party	Candidate	Votes	%
Democratic	Donald R. Foster	1,731	100.00%
Total votes		1,731	100.00%

Republican primary results
Party	Candidate	Votes	%
Republican	Earl Moritz (incumbent)	1,249	100.00%
Total votes		1,249	100.00%

General election results
Party	Candidate	Votes	%
Democratic	Donald R. Foster	3,114	51.77%
Republican	Earl Moritz (incumbent)	2,901	48.23%
Total votes		6,015	100.00%
Democratic gain from Republican			

=== District 25 ===
Democratic primary results
Party	Candidate	Votes	%
Democratic	Dave Manning (incumbent)	2,247	100.00%
Total votes		2,247	100.00%

Republican primary results
Party	Candidate	Votes	%
Republican	John Rabenberg	843	100.00%
Total votes		843	100.00%

General election results
Party	Candidate	Votes	%
Democratic	Dave Manning (incumbent)	3,566	62.53%
Republican	John Rabenberg	2,137	37.47%
Total votes		5,703	100.00%
Democratic hold			

=== District 26 ===
Republican primary results
Party	Candidate	Votes	%
Republican	William L. Mathers (incumbent)	1,309	100.00%
Total votes		1,309	100.00%

General election results
Party	Candidate	Votes	%
Republican	William L. Mathers (incumbent)	4,220	100.00%
Total votes		4,220	100.00%
Republican hold			

=== District 27 ===
Democratic primary results
Party	Candidate	Votes	%
Democratic	Cornie R. Thiessen (incumbent)	957	100.00%
Total votes		957	100.00%

Republican primary results
Party	Candidate	Votes	%
Republican	Math J. Dasinger	857	100.00%
Total votes		857	100.00%

General election results
Party	Candidate	Votes	%
Democratic	Cornie R. Thiessen (incumbent)	3,007	57.15%
Republican	Math J. Dasinger	2,255	42.85%
Total votes		5,262	100.00%
Democratic hold			

=== District 28 ===
Democratic primary results
Party	Candidate	Votes	%
Democratic	A. A. Zody (incumbent)	1,097	100.00%
Total votes		1,097	100.00%

Republican primary results
Party	Candidate	Votes	%
Republican	S. A. Olson	1,405	100.00%
Total votes		1,405	100.00%

General election results
Party	Candidate	Votes	%
Republican	S. A. Olson	2,919	55.31%
Democratic	A. A. Zody (incumbent)	2,359	44.69%
Total votes		5,278	100.00%
Republican gain from Democratic			

=== District 29 ===
Democratic primary results
Party	Candidate	Votes	%
Democratic	Carroll Graham (incumbent)	1,683	100.00%
Total votes		1,683	100.00%

Republican primary results
Party	Candidate	Votes	%
Republican	Torrey Johnson	764	100.00%
Total votes		764	100.00%

General election results
Party	Candidate	Votes	%
Democratic	Carroll Graham (incumbent)	2,366	54.03%
Republican	Torrey Johnson	2,013	45.97%
Total votes		4,379	100.00%
Democratic hold			

=== District 30 ===
Democratic primary results
Party	Candidate	Votes	%
Democratic	Max Conover	550	59.78%
Democratic	Larry L. Lund	370	40.22%
Total votes		920	100.00%

Republican primary results
Party	Candidate	Votes	%
Republican	M. E. Eddleman	528	60.27%
Republican	Thor Myhre	348	39.73%
Total votes		876	100.00%

General election results
Party	Candidate	Votes	%
Democratic	Max Conover	2,230	55.71%
Republican	M. E. Eddleman	1,773	44.29%
Total votes		4,003	100.00%
Democratic gain from Republican			

=== District 31 ===
Democratic primary results
Party	Candidate	Votes	%
Democratic	Pat Regan	645	100.00%
Total votes		645	100.00%

Republican primary results
Party	Candidate	Votes	%
Republican	Marilyn M. Degel	596	100.00%
Total votes		596	100.00%

General election results
Party	Candidate	Votes	%
Democratic	Pat Regan	2,168	63.76%
Republican	Marilyn M. Degel	1,232	36.24%
Total votes		3,400	100.00%
Democratic gain from Republican			

=== District 32 ===
Democratic primary results
Party	Candidate	Votes	%
Democratic	Bert E. Arnlund	428	100.00%
Total votes		428	100.00%

Republican primary results
Party	Candidate	Votes	%
Republican	Antoinette Fraser Rosell (incumbent)	1,321	55.30%
Republican	George Darrow (incumbent)	1,068	44.70%
Total votes		2,389	100.00%

General election results
Party	Candidate	Votes	%
Republican	Antoinette Fraser Rosell (incumbent)	3,454	71.00%
Democratic	Bert E. Arnlund	1,411	29.00%
Total votes		4,865	100.00%
Republican hold			

=== District 33 ===
Democratic primary results
Party	Candidate	Votes	%
Democratic	V. E. "Gene" Cetrone	706	100.00%
Total votes		706	100.00%

Republican primary results
Party	Candidate	Votes	%
Republican	William R. "Bill" Lowe (incumbent)	1,486	100.00%
Total votes		1,486	100.00%

General election results
Party	Candidate	Votes	%
Democratic	V. E. "Gene" Cetrone	2,732	51.13%
Republican	William R. "Bill" Lowe (incumbent)	2,611	48.87%
Total votes		5,343	100.00%
Democratic gain from Republican			

=== District 34 ===
Democratic primary results
Party	Candidate	Votes	%
Democratic	Thomas E. Towe	770	100.00%
Total votes		770	100.00%

Republican primary results
Party	Candidate	Votes	%
Republican	Henry S. "Hank" Cox	915	100.00%
Total votes		915	100.00%

General election results
Party	Candidate	Votes	%
Democratic	Thomas E. Towe	2,874	60.30%
Republican	Henry S. "Hank" Cox	1,892	39.70%
Total votes		4,766	100.00%
Democratic gain from Republican			

=== District 35 ===
Democratic primary results
Party	Candidate	Votes	%
Democratic	Chet Blaylock	901	100.00%
Total votes		901	100.00%

General election results
Party	Candidate	Votes	%
Democratic	Chet Blaylock	3,041	100.00%
Total votes		3,041	100.00%
Democratic gain from Republican			

=== District 36 ===
Democratic primary results
Party	Candidate	Votes	%
Democratic	Frank Danichek	2,384	100.00%
Total votes		2,384	100.00%

Republican primary results
Party	Candidate	Votes	%
Republican	L. M. "Larry" Aber (incumbent)	1,161	100.00%
Total votes		1,161	100.00%

General election results
Party	Candidate	Votes	%
Republican	L. M. "Larry" Aber (incumbent)	3,649	58.18%
Democratic	Frank Danichek	2,623	41.82%
Total votes		6,272	100.00%
Republican hold			

=== District 37 ===
Democratic primary results
Party	Candidate	Votes	%
Democratic	Richard C. Parks	827	60.59%
Democratic	Margaret Raihl	538	39.41%
Total votes		1,365	100.00%

Republican primary results
Party	Candidate	Votes	%
Republican	Pete Story (incumbent)	2,536	100.00%
Total votes		2,536	100.00%

General election results
Party	Candidate	Votes	%
Republican	Pete Story (incumbent)	3,562	56.72%
Democratic	Richard C. Parks	2,718	43.28%
Total votes		6,280	100.00%
Republican hold			

=== District 38 ===
Democratic primary results
Party	Candidate	Votes	%
Democratic	Paul F. Boylan (incumbent)	1,250	100.00%
Total votes		1,250	100.00%

Republican primary results
Party	Candidate	Votes	%
Republican	Donald L. Brelsford	1,344	100.00%
Total votes		1,344	100.00%

General election results
Party	Candidate	Votes	%
Democratic	Paul F. Boylan (incumbent)	3,295	62.35%
Republican	Donald L. Brelsford	1,990	37.65%
Total votes		5,285	100.00%
Democratic hold			

=== District 39 ===
Democratic primary results
Party	Candidate	Votes	%
Democratic	Ann Seibel	1,062	100.00%
Total votes		1,062	100.00%

Republican primary results
Party	Candidate	Votes	%
Republican	Wallace O. Forsgren	1,147	100.00%
Total votes		1,147	100.00%

General election results
Party	Candidate	Votes	%
Democratic	Ann Seibel	2,511	53.85%
Republican	Wallace O. Forsgren	2,152	46.15%
Total votes		4,663	100.00%
Democratic gain from Republican			

=== District 40 ===
Democratic primary results
Party	Candidate	Votes	%
Democratic	Terry Murphy	1,821	68.00%
Democratic	Wally Cox	857	32.00%
Total votes		2,678	100.00%

Republican primary results
Party	Candidate	Votes	%
Republican	M. Leo Clinton	487	34.91%
Republican	Kenneth M. Diehl	370	26.52%
Republican	Charles H. Mahoney	269	19.28%
Republican	Joe Miller	269	19.28%
Total votes		1,395	100.00%

General election results
Party	Candidate	Votes	%
Democratic	Terry Murphy	3,326	59.81%
Republican	M. Leo Clinton	2,235	40.19%
Total votes		5,561	100.00%
Democratic gain from Republican			

=== District 41 ===
Democratic primary results
Party	Candidate	Votes	%
Democratic	Dave Gallagher	850	100.00%
Total votes		850	100.00%

Republican primary results
Party	Candidate	Votes	%
Republican	Frank W. Hazelbaker (incumbent)	2,534	100.00%
Total votes		2,534	100.00%

General election results
Party	Candidate	Votes	%
Republican	Frank W. Hazelbaker (incumbent)	3,567	72.46%
Democratic	Dave Gallagher	1,356	27.54%
Total votes		4,923	100.00%
Republican hold			

=== District 42 ===
Democratic primary results
Party	Candidate	Votes	%
Democratic	Neil J. Lynch (incumbent)	3,051	100.00%
Total votes		3,051	100.00%

General election results
Party	Candidate	Votes	%
Democratic	Neil J. Lynch (incumbent)	3,886	100.00%
Total votes		3,886	100.00%
Democratic hold			

=== District 43 ===
Democratic primary results
Party	Candidate	Votes	%
Democratic	Robert E. "Bob" Lee	2,220	55.96%
Democratic	Maurice Driscoll	1,747	44.04%
Total votes		3,967	100.00%

General election results
Party	Candidate	Votes	%
Democratic	Robert E. "Bob" Lee	3,641	100.00%
Total votes		3,641	100.00%
Democratic gain from Republican			

=== District 44 ===
Democratic primary results
Party	Candidate	Votes	%
Democratic	John E. "Jack" Healy	2,272	55.36%
Democratic	Dan W. Harrington	1,832	44.64%
Total votes		4,104	100.00%

General election results
Party	Candidate	Votes	%
Democratic	John E. "Jack" Healy	3,587	100.00%
Total votes		3,587	100.00%
Democratic gain from Republican			

=== District 45 ===
Democratic primary results
Party	Candidate	Votes	%
Democratic	John "Sandy" Mehrens	2,115	52.55%
Democratic	Joseph H. McCarvel	1,322	32.84%
Democratic	Edward D. Yelsa	588	14.61%
Total votes		4,025	100.00%

General election results
Party	Candidate	Votes	%
Democratic	John "Sandy" Mehrens	3,735	100.00%
Total votes		3,735	100.00%
Democratic gain from Republican			

=== District 46 ===
Democratic primary results
Party	Candidate	Votes	%
Democratic	Miles Romney (incumbent)	1,884	100.00%
Total votes		1,884	100.00%

Republican primary results
Party	Candidate	Votes	%
Republican	Steve Mills	1,743	100.00%
Total votes		1,743	100.00%

General election results
Party	Candidate	Votes	%
Democratic	Miles Romney (incumbent)	3,584	52.46%
Republican	Steve Mills	3,248	47.54%
Total votes		6,832	100.00%
Democratic hold			

=== District 47 ===
Democratic primary results
Party	Candidate	Votes	%
Democratic	Bill Norman	1,862	100.00%
Total votes		1,862	100.00%

Republican primary results
Party	Candidate	Votes	%
Republican	Harry T. Northey (incumbent)	591	100.00%
Total votes		591	100.00%

General election results
Party	Candidate	Votes	%
Democratic	Bill Norman	2,653	55.03%
Republican	Harry T. Northey (incumbent)	2,168	44.97%
Total votes		4,821	100.00%
Democratic gain from Republican			

=== District 48 ===
Democratic primary results
Party	Candidate	Votes	%
Democratic	Elmer Flynn (incumbent)	2,160	100.00%
Total votes		2,160	100.00%

General election results
Party	Candidate	Votes	%
Democratic	Elmer Flynn (incumbent)	3,763	100.00%
Total votes		3,763	100.00%
Democratic hold			

=== District 49 ===
Democratic primary results
Party	Candidate	Votes	%
Democratic	Robert D. Watt	1,719	100.00%
Total votes		1,719	100.00%

Republican primary results
Party	Candidate	Votes	%
Republican	Reuben A. Diettert	220	51.16%
Republican	John Badgley	210	48.84%
Total votes		430	100.00%

General election results
Party	Candidate	Votes	%
Democratic	Robert D. Watt	2,489	61.69%
Republican	Reuben A. Diettert	1,546	38.31%
Total votes		4,035	100.00%
Democratic gain from Republican			

=== District 50 ===
Democratic primary results
Party	Candidate	Votes	%
Democratic	Richard A. Colberg	1,837	100.00%
Total votes		1,837	100.00%

Republican primary results
Party	Candidate	Votes	%
Republican	Fred G. Carl (incumbent)	577	56.79%
Republican	Fred W. Thomson	439	43.21%
Total votes		1,016	100.00%

General election results
Party	Candidate	Votes	%
Democratic	Richard A. Colberg	3,052	55.37%
Republican	Fred G. Carl (incumbent)	2,460	44.63%
Total votes		5,512	100.00%
Democratic gain from Republican			

== See also ==
- 1974 United States House of Representatives elections in Montana
- 1974 Montana House of Representatives election
