= 1976 Montana Senate election =

- November 2, 1976

25 of the 50 seats in the Montana Senate 26 seats needed for a majority
	Majority party	Minority party
Leader	W. Gordon McOmber	Frank W. Hazelbaker
Party	Democratic	Republican
Leader's seat	6th-Fairfield	41st-Dillon
Last election	30	20
Seats after	25	25
Seat change	▼5	▲5
Senate President before election
W. Gordon McOmber
Democratic
Elected Senate President
W. Gordon McOmber
Democratic

The 1976 Montana Senate election took place on November 2, 1976, with the primary election held on June 1, 1976. Montana voters elected 25 of the 50 members of the Montana Senate. The election coincided with United States national elections and Montana state elections, including U.S. President, U.S. Senate, U.S. House, Montana Governor and Montana House.

Following the previous election in 1974, Democrats held a 30-to-20-seat majority over Republicans. Democrats and Republicans were tied at 25 seats each following the 1976 election—giving Republicans a net gain of five seats. The newly elected members served in the 45th Montana State Legislature, during which Democrat W. Gordon McOmber was re-elected President of the Montana Senate.

== Retiring incumbents ==
=== Democrats ===
1. District 20: Mike Greely
2. District 42: Neil J. Lynch
3. District 50: Richard A. Colberg

=== Republicans ===
1. District 16: Glen L. Drake
2. District 32: Antoinette "Toni" Fraser Rosell

== Incumbents defeated in general election ==
=== Democrats ===
1. District 24: Don Foster
2. District 30: Max Conover
3. District 33: Gene Cetrone
4. District 39: Ann Seibel

== Summary of results ==
Italics denote an open seat held by the incumbent party; bold text denotes a gain for a party. Only districts that held elections are listed below.

State senate district	Incumbent	Party	Elected senator	Outcome
1	Ed B. Smith	Rep	Ed B. Smith	Rep hold
2	Mark Etchart	Rep	Mark Etchart	Rep hold
3	Greg Jergeson	Dem	Greg Jergeson	Dem hold
8	Richard G. Smith	Dem	Richard G. Smith	Dem hold
10	Bob Brown	Rep	Bob Brown	Rep hold
12	George McCallum	Rep	George McCallum	Rep hold
13	Jean A. Turnage	Rep	Jean A. Turnage	Rep hold
16	Glen L. Drake	Rep	A. T. "Tom" Rasmussen	Rep hold
17	Larry Fasbender	Dem	Larry Fasbender	Dem hold
20	Mike Greely	Dem	Bill Thomas	Dem hold
21	George F. Roskie	Rep	George F. Roskie	Rep hold
24	Don Foster	Dem	**Harold L. Dover**	**Rep gain**
26	William L. Mathers	Rep	William L. Mathers	Rep hold
27	Cornie R. Thiessen	Dem	Cornie R. Thiessen	Dem hold
29	Carroll Graham	Dem	Carroll Graham	Dem hold
30	Max Conover	Dem	**Tom Hager**	**Rep gain**
32	Antoinette "Toni" Fraser Rosell	Rep	Lloyd C. Lockrem Jr.	Rep hold
33	Gene Cetrone	Dem	**William R. "Bill" Lowe**	**Rep gain**
39	Ann Seibel	Dem	**Everett R. Lensink**	**Rep gain**
41	Frank W. Hazelbaker	Rep	Frank W. Hazelbaker	Rep hold
42	Neil J. Lynch	Dem	Bob Peterson	Dem hold
43	Robert E. "Bob" Lee	Dem	Robert E. "Bob" Lee	Dem hold
45	John "Sandy" Mehrens	Dem	John "Sandy" Mehrens	Dem hold
49	Robert D. Watt	Dem	Robert D. Watt	Dem hold
50	Richard A. Colberg	Dem	**Don H. Weston** (Note: Republican Don H. Weston won the election; however, he died in December 1976 before taking office. Republican William E. Murray was appointed on December 22, 1976 to replace deceased Senator-elect Weston.)	**Rep gain**

== Detailed results by district ==
=== District 1 ===
Democratic primary results
Party	Candidate	Votes	%
Democratic	Wallace B. Edland	1,487	100.00%
Total votes		1,487	100.00%

Republican primary results
Party	Candidate	Votes	%
Republican	Ed B. Smith (incumbent)	1,572	100.00%
Total votes		1,572	100.00%

General election results
Party	Candidate	Votes	%
Republican	Ed B. Smith (incumbent)	3,945	63.55%
Democratic	Wallace B. Edland	2,263	36.45%
Total votes		6,208	100.00%
Republican hold			

=== District 2 ===
Democratic primary results
Party	Candidate	Votes	%
Democratic	William S. Forsythe	1,225	100.00%
Total votes		1,225	100.00%

Republican primary results
Party	Candidate	Votes	%
Republican	Mark Etchart (incumbent)	1,413	100.00%
Total votes		1,413	100.00%

General election results
Party	Candidate	Votes	%
Republican	Mark Etchart (incumbent)	3,872	65.38%
Democratic	William S. Forsythe	2,050	34.62%
Total votes		5,922	100.00%
Republican hold			

=== District 3 ===
Democratic primary results
Party	Candidate	Votes	%
Democratic	Greg Jergeson (incumbent)	1,710	100.00%
Total votes		1,710	100.00%

Republican primary results
Party	Candidate	Votes	%
Republican	E. L. Luckett	1,247	100.00%
Total votes		1,247	100.00%

General election results
Party	Candidate	Votes	%
Democratic	Greg Jergeson (incumbent)	3,500	59.92%
Republican	E. L. Luckett	2,341	40.08%
Total votes		5,841	100.00%
Democratic hold			

=== District 8 ===
Democratic primary results
Party	Candidate	Votes	%
Democratic	Richard G. Smith (incumbent)	1,506	100.00%
Total votes		1,506	100.00%

Republican primary results
Party	Candidate	Votes	%
Republican	Walt Whirry	778	54.33%
Republican	Walter Deets	654	45.67%
Total votes		1,432	100.00%

General election results
Party	Candidate	Votes	%
Democratic	Richard G. Smith (incumbent)	3,250	52.03%
Republican	Walt Whirry	2,996	47.97%
Total votes		6,246	100.00%
Democratic hold			

=== District 10 ===
Democratic primary results
Party	Candidate	Votes	%
Democratic	Cecil H. Storms	1,446	100.00%
Total votes		1,446	100.00%

Republican primary results
Party	Candidate	Votes	%
Republican	Bob Brown (incumbent)	1,229	100.00%
Total votes		1,229	100.00%

General election results
Party	Candidate	Votes	%
Republican	Bob Brown (incumbent)	3,763	61.03%
Democratic	Cecil H. Storms	2,403	38.97%
Total votes		6,166	100.00%
Republican hold			

=== District 12 ===
Democratic primary results
Party	Candidate	Votes	%
Democratic	John F. Harwood	1,511	61.32%
Democratic	Claude H. "Blackie" Lackner	953	38.68%
Total votes		2,464	100.00%

Republican primary results
Party	Candidate	Votes	%
Republican	George McCallum (incumbent)	1,542	100.00%
Total votes		1,542	100.00%

General election results
Party	Candidate	Votes	%
Republican	George McCallum (incumbent)	4,327	59.13%
Democratic	John F. Harwood	2,991	40.87%
Total votes		7,318	100.00%
Republican hold			

=== District 13 ===
Democratic primary results
Party	Candidate	Votes	%
Democratic	David V. Scheeler	1,410	100.00%
Total votes		1,410	100.00%

Republican primary results
Party	Candidate	Votes	%
Republican	Jean A. Turnage (incumbent)	2,063	100.00%
Total votes		2,063	100.00%

General election results
Party	Candidate	Votes	%
Republican	Jean A. Turnage (incumbent)	4,525	63.80%
Democratic	David V. Scheeler	2,567	36.20%
Total votes		7,092	100.00%
Republican hold			

=== District 16 ===
Democratic primary results
Party	Candidate	Votes	%
Democratic	Rick Reese	1,219	57.07%
Democratic	Mary D. Munger	917	42.93%
Total votes		2,136	100.00%

Republican primary results
Party	Candidate	Votes	%
Republican	A. T. "Tom" Rasmussen	1,243	61.84%
Republican	C. E. "Sandy" McPherson	532	26.47%
Republican	Barbara "Bobby" Byrd	235	11.69%
Total votes		2,010	100.00%

General election results
Party	Candidate	Votes	%
Republican	A. T. "Tom" Rasmussen	3,495	50.15%
Democratic	Rick Reese	3,474	49.85%
Total votes		6,969	100.00%
Republican hold			

=== District 17 ===
Democratic primary results
Party	Candidate	Votes	%
Democratic	Larry Fasbender (incumbent)	1,671	100.00%
Total votes		1,671	100.00%

Republican primary results
Party	Candidate	Votes	%
Republican	William C. Shortridge	919	100.00%
Total votes		919	100.00%

General election results
Party	Candidate	Votes	%
Democratic	Larry Fasbender (incumbent)	3,081	57.56%
Republican	William C. Shortridge	2,272	42.44%
Total votes		5,353	100.00%
Democratic hold			

=== District 20 ===
Democratic primary results
Party	Candidate	Votes	%
Democratic	Bill Thomas	1,307	100.00%
Total votes		1,307	100.00%

Republican primary results
Party	Candidate	Votes	%
Republican	Sal Leigland	694	62.35%
Republican	John J. Gilligan	419	37.65%
Total votes		1,113	100.00%

General election results
Party	Candidate	Votes	%
Democratic	Bill Thomas	2,798	57.70%
Republican	Sal Leigland	2,051	42.30%
Total votes		4,849	100.00%
Democratic hold			

=== District 21 ===
Democratic primary results
Party	Candidate	Votes	%
Democratic	Donald "Jim" Skinner	746	53.32%
Democratic	Edward J. Warren	653	46.68%
Total votes		1,399	100.00%

Republican primary results
Party	Candidate	Votes	%
Republican	George F. Roskie (incumbent)	1,152	100.00%
Total votes		1,152	100.00%

General election results
Party	Candidate	Votes	%
Republican	George F. Roskie (incumbent)	3,037	57.80%
Democratic	Donald "Jim" Skinner	2,217	42.20%
Total votes		5,254	100.00%
Republican hold			

=== District 24 ===
Democratic primary results
Party	Candidate	Votes	%
Democratic	Don Foster (incumbent)	1,810	100.00%
Total votes		1,810	100.00%

Republican primary results
Party	Candidate	Votes	%
Republican	Harold L. Dover	1,214	41.76%
Republican	W. G. "Bud" Rafter	855	29.41%
Republican	Dale K. Knox	838	28.83%
Total votes		2,907	100.00%

General election results
Party	Candidate	Votes	%
Republican	Harold L. Dover	3,680	50.65%
Democratic	Don Foster (incumbent)	3,585	49.35%
Total votes		7,265	100.00%
Republican gain from Democratic			

=== District 26 ===
Republican primary results
Party	Candidate	Votes	%
Republican	William L. Mathers (incumbent)	1,688	100.00%
Total votes		1,688	100.00%

General election results
Party	Candidate	Votes	%
Republican	William L. Mathers (incumbent)	5,185	100.00%
Total votes		5,185	100.00%
Republican hold			

=== District 27 ===
Democratic primary results
Party	Candidate	Votes	%
Democratic	Cornie R. Thiessen (incumbent)	1,567	100.00%
Total votes		1,567	100.00%

Republican primary results
Party	Candidate	Votes	%
Republican	James R. Miller	1,386	100.00%
Total votes		1,386	100.00%

General election results
Party	Candidate	Votes	%
Democratic	Cornie R. Thiessen (incumbent)	3,540	56.04%
Republican	James R. Miller	2,777	43.96%
Total votes		6,317	100.00%
Democratic hold			

=== District 29 ===
Democratic primary results
Party	Candidate	Votes	%
Democratic	Carroll Graham (incumbent)	1,359	100.00%
Total votes		1,359	100.00%

General election results
Party	Candidate	Votes	%
Democratic	Carroll Graham (incumbent)	3,408	69.00%
Independent	Tom Dailey	1,531	31.00%
Total votes		4,939	100.00%
Democratic hold			

=== District 30 ===
Democratic primary results
Party	Candidate	Votes	%
Democratic	Max Conover (incumbent)	1,452	100.00%
Total votes		1,452	100.00%

Republican primary results
Party	Candidate	Votes	%
Republican	Tom Hager	887	58.55%
Republican	M. E. Eddleman	628	41.45%
Total votes		1,515	100.00%

General election results
Party	Candidate	Votes	%
Republican	Tom Hager	3,972	53.55%
Democratic	Max Conover (incumbent)	3,445	46.45%
Total votes		7,417	100.00%
Republican gain from Democratic			

=== District 32 ===
Democratic primary results
Party	Candidate	Votes	%
Democratic	Iris P. Walthall	893	100.00%
Total votes		893	100.00%

Republican primary results
Party	Candidate	Votes	%
Republican	Lloyd C. Lockrem Jr.	2,039	73.29%
Republican	John F. Self	743	26.71%
Total votes		2,782	100.00%

General election results
Party	Candidate	Votes	%
Republican	Lloyd C. Lockrem Jr.	5,238	73.18%
Democratic	Iris P. Walthall	1,920	26.82%
Total votes		7,158	100.00%
Republican hold			

=== District 33 ===
Democratic primary results
Party	Candidate	Votes	%
Democratic	Gene Cetrone (incumbent)	1,339	100.00%
Total votes		1,339	100.00%

Republican primary results
Party	Candidate	Votes	%
Republican	William R. "Bill" Lowe	1,968	100.00%
Total votes		1,968	100.00%

General election results
Party	Candidate	Votes	%
Republican	William R. "Bill" Lowe	3,807	54.57%
Democratic	Gene Cetrone (incumbent)	3,169	45.43%
Total votes		6,976	100.00%
Republican gain from Democratic			

=== District 39 ===
Democratic primary results
Party	Candidate	Votes	%
Democratic	Ann Seibel (incumbent)	1,291	100.00%
Total votes		1,291	100.00%

Republican primary results
Party	Candidate	Votes	%
Republican	Everett R. Lensink	1,398	100.00%
Total votes		1,398	100.00%

General election results
Party	Candidate	Votes	%
Republican	Everett R. Lensink	3,110	52.19%
Democratic	Ann Seibel (incumbent)	2,849	47.81%
Total votes		5,959	100.00%
Republican gain from Democratic			

=== District 41 ===
Republican primary results
Party	Candidate	Votes	%
Republican	Frank W. Hazelbaker (incumbent)	2,641	100.00%
Total votes		2,641	100.00%

General election results
Party	Candidate	Votes	%
Republican	Frank W. Hazelbaker (incumbent)	5,120	100.00%
Total votes		5,120	100.00%
Republican hold			

=== District 42 ===
Democratic primary results
Party	Candidate	Votes	%
Democratic	Bob Peterson	1,483	53.67%
Democratic	Al Luebeck	1,280	46.33%
Total votes		2,763	100.00%

General election results
Party	Candidate	Votes	%
Democratic	Bob Peterson	4,824	100.00%
Total votes		4,824	100.00%
Democratic hold			

=== District 43 ===
Democratic primary results
Party	Candidate	Votes	%
Democratic	Robert E. "Bob" Lee (incumbent)	1,501	100.00%
Total votes		1,501	100.00%

General election results
Party	Candidate	Votes	%
Democratic	Robert E. "Bob" Lee (incumbent)	4,500	100.00%
Total votes		4,500	100.00%
Democratic hold			

=== District 45 ===
Democratic primary results
Party	Candidate	Votes	%
Democratic	John "Sandy" Mehrens (incumbent)	1,849	58.79%
Democratic	Joseph H. McCarvel	1,296	41.21%
Total votes		3,145	100.00%

Republican primary results
Party	Candidate	Votes	%
Republican	Joyce W. Stancliffe	415	100.00%
Total votes		415	100.00%

General election results
Party	Candidate	Votes	%
Democratic	John "Sandy" Mehrens (incumbent)	3,888	75.67%
Republican	Joyce W. Stancliffe	1,250	24.33%
Total votes		5,138	100.00%
Democratic hold			

=== District 49 ===
Democratic primary results
Party	Candidate	Votes	%
Democratic	Robert D. Watt (incumbent)	1,238	52.15%
Democratic	Roy E. Burditt	1,136	47.85%
Total votes		2,374	100.00%

Republican primary results
Party	Candidate	Votes	%
Republican	George R. Wolstad	1,051	100.00%
Total votes		1,051	100.00%

General election results
Party	Candidate	Votes	%
Democratic	Robert D. Watt (incumbent)	3,793	63.56%
Republican	George R. Wolstad	2,175	36.44%
Total votes		5,968	100.00%
Democratic hold			

=== District 50 ===
Democratic primary results
Party	Candidate	Votes	%
Democratic	Daphne Bugbee	2,165	100.00%
Total votes		2,165	100.00%

Republican primary results
Party	Candidate	Votes	%
Republican	Don H. Weston	1,065	41.68%
Republican	Horace H. "Shorty" Koessler	920	36.01%
Republican	Larry Livingston	570	22.31%
Total votes		2,555	100.00%

General election results
Party	Candidate	Votes	%
Republican	Don H. Weston	4,507	55.23%
Democratic	Daphne Bugbee	3,653	44.77%
Total votes		8,160	100.00%
Republican gain from Democratic			

== See also ==
- 1976 United States presidential election in Montana
- 1976 United States Senate election in Montana
- 1976 United States House of Representatives elections in Montana
- 1976 Montana gubernatorial election
- 1976 Montana House of Representatives election
