= 1978 Montana Senate election =

- November 7, 1978

27 (Note: In 1978, Montana held 25 regular state senate elections and two special elections in districts 43 and 50 for seats that had been vacated.) of the 50 seats in the Montana Senate 26 seats needed for a majority
	Majority party	Minority party
	Rep	Dem
Leader	Jean A. Turnage	W. Gordon McOmber (retired)
Party	Republican	Democratic
Leader's seat	13th-Polson	6th-Fairfield
Last election	25	25
Seats after	26	24
Seat change	▲1	▼1
Senate President before election
W. Gordon McOmber
Democratic
Elected Senate President
William L. Mathers
Republican

The 1978 Montana Senate election took place on November 7, 1978, with the primary election held on June 6, 1978. Montana voters elected 27 of the 50 members of the Montana Senate. The election coincided with United States national elections and Montana state elections, including U.S. Senate, U.S. House, and Montana House.

Following the previous election in 1976, the chamber was tied with both Democrats and Republicans holding 25 seats. Republicans flipped control of the chamber in 1978 by winning 26 seats while Democrats held 24—giving Republicans a net gain of one seat. The newly elected members served in the 46th Montana State Legislature, during which Republican William L. Mathers was elected President of the Montana Senate.

== Retiring incumbents ==
=== Democrats ===
1. District 6: W. Gordon McOmber
2. District 11: Joe R. Roberts
3. District 19: John W. “Jack” Devine
4. District 43: Robert E. "Bob" Lee (Note: Democratic Senator Bob Lee did not complete the term to which he was elected in 1976.)
5. District 46: Miles Romney

== Incumbent defeated in primary election ==
=== Democrat ===
1. District 48: Elmer Flynn

== Incumbents defeated in general election ==
=== Democrats ===
1. District 18: Margaret S. Warden
2. District 40: Terry Murphy

=== Republicans ===
1. District 15: Frank Dunkle
2. District 36: L. M. “Larry” Aber
3. District 50: William E. "Bill" Murray (Note: Republican Don H. Weston won election to the Montana Senate in 1976; however, he died in December 1976 before taking office. Republican William E. "Bill" Murray was appointed on December 22, 1976 to replace deceased Senator-elect Weston until the 1978 election.)

== Summary of results ==
Italics denote an open seat held by the incumbent party; bold text denotes a gain for a party.

State senate district	Incumbent	Party	Elected senator	Outcome
4	Stan Stephens	Rep	Stan Stephens	Rep hold
5	Allen C. Kolstad	Rep	Allen C. Kolstad	Rep hold
6	W. Gordon McOmber	Dem	**Gary Aklestad**	**Rep gain**
7	Harold C. Nelson	Rep	Harold C. Nelson	Rep hold
9	Matt Himsl	Rep	Matt Himsl	Rep hold
11	Joe R. Roberts	Dem	William F. Hafferman	Dem hold
14	John E. Manley	Dem	John E. Manley	Dem hold
15	Frank Dunkle	Rep	**Steve Brown**	**Dem gain**
18	Margaret S. Warden	Dem	**Jesse A. O'Hara**	**Rep gain**
19	John W. “Jack” Devine	Dem	Patrick L. Ryan	Dem hold
22	Pat M. Goodover	Rep	Pat M. Goodover	Rep hold
23	Jack E. Galt	Rep	Jack E. Galt	Rep hold
25	Dave Manning	Dem	Dave Manning	Dem hold
28	S. A. Olson	Rep	S. A. Olson	Rep hold
31	Pat Regan	Dem	Pat Regan	Dem hold
34	Thomas E. Towe	Dem	Thomas E. Towe	Dem hold
35	Chet Blaylock	Dem	Chet Blaylock	Dem hold
36	L. M. “Larry” Aber	Rep	**Max Conover**	**Dem gain**
37	Pete Story	Rep	Pete Story	Rep hold
38	Paul F. Boylan	Dem	Paul F. Boylan	Dem hold
40	Terry Murphy	Dem	**Mike Anderson**	**Rep gain**
43	Robert E. "Bob" Lee	Dem	Lawrence C. Stimatz	Dem hold
44	John E. "Jack" Healy	Dem	John E. "Jack" Healy	Dem hold
46	Miles Romney	Dem	**Elmer D. Severson**	**Rep gain**
47	Bill Norman	Dem	Bill Norman	Dem hold
48	Elmer Flynn	Dem	Bob Palmer	Dem hold
50	William E. "Bill" Murray	Rep	**Fred Van Valkenburg**	**Dem gain**

== Detailed results by district ==
=== District 4 ===
Democratic primary results
Party	Candidate	Votes	%
Democratic	Donald W. Meyers	1,421	100.00%
Total votes		1,421	100.00%

Republican primary results
Party	Candidate	Votes	%
Republican	Stan Stephens (incumbent)	722	100.00%
Total votes		722	100.00%

General election results
Party	Candidate	Votes	%
Republican	Stan Stephens (incumbent)	3,172	68.58%
Democratic	Donald W. Meyers	1,453	31.42%
Total votes		4,625	100.00%
Republican hold			

=== District 5 ===
Democratic primary results
Party	Candidate	Votes	%
Democratic	Beverly "Bobbi" Swank	2,314	100.00%
Total votes		2,314	100.00%

Republican primary results
Party	Candidate	Votes	%
Republican	Allen C. Kolstad (incumbent)	653	100.00%
Total votes		653	100.00%

General election results
Party	Candidate	Votes	%
Republican	Allen C. Kolstad (incumbent)	4,652	78.58%
Democratic	Beverly "Bobbi" Swank	1,268	21.42%
Total votes		5,920	100.00%
Republican hold			

=== District 6 ===
Democratic primary results
Party	Candidate	Votes	%
Democratic	Robert E. Stephens	1,196	31.83%
Democratic	Gary Dyer	1,136	30.24%
Democratic	Joe H. Preputin	911	24.25%
Democratic	Russell R. Andrews	514	13.68%
Total votes		3,757	100.00%

Republican primary results
Party	Candidate	Votes	%
Republican	Gary Aklestad	1,060	100.00%
Total votes		1,060	100.00%

General election results
Party	Candidate	Votes	%
Republican	Gary Aklestad	3,845	55.69%
Democratic	Robert E. Stephens	3,059	44.31%
Total votes		6,904	100.00%
Republican gain from Democratic			

=== District 7 ===
Democratic primary results
Party	Candidate	Votes	%
Democratic	Clifford Stoltz	930	34.91%
Democratic	Billie H. Wallace	895	33.60%
Democratic	Donald "Don" Pemberton	839	31.49%
Total votes		2,664	100.00%

Republican primary results
Party	Candidate	Votes	%
Republican	Harold C. Nelson (incumbent)	756	100.00%
Total votes		756	100.00%

General election results
Party	Candidate	Votes	%
Republican	Harold C. Nelson (incumbent)	2,672	58.55%
Democratic	Clifford Stoltz	1,892	41.45%
Total votes		4,564	100.00%
Republican hold			

=== District 9 ===
Democratic primary results
Party	Candidate	Votes	%
Democratic	Richard J. "Rick" Champoux	1,523	100.00%
Total votes		1,523	100.00%

Republican primary results
Party	Candidate	Votes	%
Republican	Matt Himsl (incumbent)	1,779	100.00%
Total votes		1,779	100.00%

General election results
Party	Candidate	Votes	%
Republican	Matt Himsl (incumbent)	3,046	57.19%
Democratic	Richard J. "Rick" Champoux	2,280	42.81%
Total votes		5,326	100.00%
Republican hold			

=== District 11 ===
Democratic primary results
Party	Candidate	Votes	%
Democratic	William F. Hafferman	1,100	41.79%
Democratic	Robert C. "Bob" Case	772	29.33%
Democratic	Paul W. Applegate	658	25.00%
Democratic	Terry A. Bicknell	102	3.88%
Total votes		2,632	100.00%

General election results
Party	Candidate	Votes	%
Democratic	William F. Hafferman	3,433	100.00%
Total votes		3,433	100.00%
Democratic hold			

=== District 14 ===
Democratic primary results
Party	Candidate	Votes	%
Democratic	John E. Manley (incumbent)	1,331	50.59%
Democratic	Ron Scharf	1,300	49.41%
Total votes		2,631	100.00%

General election results
Party	Candidate	Votes	%
Democratic	John E. Manley (incumbent)	4,100	100.00%
Total votes		4,100	100.00%
Democratic hold			

=== District 15 ===
Democratic primary results
Party	Candidate	Votes	%
Democratic	Steve Brown	2,830	100.00%
Total votes		2,830	100.00%

Republican primary results
Party	Candidate	Votes	%
Republican	Frank Dunkle (incumbent)	594	63.60%
Republican	Roger K. Barrett	340	36.40%
Total votes		934	100.00%

General election results
Party	Candidate	Votes	%
Democratic	Steve Brown	3,864	51.60%
Republican	Frank Dunkle (incumbent)	3,624	48.40%
Total votes		7,488	100.00%
Democratic gain from Republican			

=== District 18 ===
Democratic primary results
Party	Candidate	Votes	%
Democratic	Margaret S. Warden (incumbent)	1,533	100.00%
Total votes		1,533	100.00%

Republican primary results
Party	Candidate	Votes	%
Republican	Jesse A. O'Hara	284	100.00%
Total votes		284	100.00%

General election results
Party	Candidate	Votes	%
Republican	Jesse A. O'Hara	2,175	52.30%
Democratic	Margaret S. Warden (incumbent)	1,984	47.70%
Total votes		4,159	100.00%
Republican gain from Democratic			

=== District 19 ===
Democratic primary results
Party	Candidate	Votes	%
Democratic	Patrick L. Ryan	1,122	100.00%
Total votes		1,122	100.00%

Republican primary results
Party	Candidate	Votes	%
Republican	Rodger D. Young (Note: Although Rodger D. Young won the primary, Greg Nelson was the Republican nominee in the general election.)	198	100.00%
Total votes		198	100.00%

General election results
Party	Candidate	Votes	%
Democratic	Patrick L. Ryan	1,887	61.79%
Republican	Greg Nelson	1,167	38.21%
Total votes		3,054	100.00%
Democratic hold			

=== District 22 ===
Democratic primary results
Party	Candidate	Votes	%
Democratic	Jacob D. Beck	552	100.00%
Total votes		552	100.00%

Republican primary results
Party	Candidate	Votes	%
Republican	Pat M. Goodover (incumbent)	367	100.00%
Total votes		367	100.00%

General election results
Party	Candidate	Votes	%
Republican	Pat M. Goodover (incumbent)	1,492	67.60%
Democratic	Jacob D. Beck	715	32.40%
Total votes		2,207	100.00%
Republican hold			

=== District 23 ===
Republican primary results
Party	Candidate	Votes	%
Republican	Jack E. Galt (incumbent)	1,474	100.00%
Total votes		1,474	100.00%

General election results
Party	Candidate	Votes	%
Republican	Jack E. Galt (incumbent)	5,018	100.00%
Total votes		5,018	100.00%
Republican hold			

=== District 25 ===
Democratic primary results
Party	Candidate	Votes	%
Democratic	Dave Manning (incumbent)	2,061	100.00%
Total votes		2,061	100.00%

Republican primary results
Party	Candidate	Votes	%
Republican	Gary L. Gershmel	1,471	100.00%
Total votes		1,471	100.00%

General election results
Party	Candidate	Votes	%
Democratic	Dave Manning (incumbent)	3,207	50.32%
Republican	Gary L. Gershmel	3,166	49.68%
Total votes		6,373	100.00%
Democratic hold			

=== District 28 ===
Democratic primary results
Party	Candidate	Votes	%
Democratic	Kenneth Rustad	1,420	100.00%
Total votes		1,420	100.00%

Republican primary results
Party	Candidate	Votes	%
Republican	S. A. Olson (incumbent)	1,455	100.00%
Total votes		1,455	100.00%

General election results
Party	Candidate	Votes	%
Republican	S. A. Olson (incumbent)	2,771	50.66%
Democratic	Kenneth Rustad	2,699	49.34%
Total votes		5,470	100.00%
Republican hold			

=== District 31 ===
Democratic primary results
Party	Candidate	Votes	%
Democratic	Pat Regan (incumbent)	670	58.57%
Democratic	Wallace W. Frickle	474	41.43%
Total votes		1,144	100.00%

Republican primary results
Party	Candidate	Votes	%
Republican	Craig Degenhardt	421	100.00%
Total votes		421	100.00%

General election results
Party	Candidate	Votes	%
Democratic	Pat Regan (incumbent)	2,178	65.23%
Republican	Craig Degenhardt	1,161	34.77%
Total votes		3,339	100.00%
Democratic hold			

=== District 34 ===
Democratic primary results
Party	Candidate	Votes	%
Democratic	Thomas E. Towe (incumbent)	1,324	74.17%
Democratic	James P. Twomey	461	25.83%
Total votes		1,785	100.00%

Republican primary results
Party	Candidate	Votes	%
Republican	Lou Aleksich	745	100.00%
Total votes		745	100.00%

General election results
Party	Candidate	Votes	%
Democratic	Thomas E. Towe (incumbent)	3,421	59.64%
Republican	Lou Aleksich	2,315	40.36%
Total votes		5,736	100.00%
Democratic hold			

=== District 35 ===
Democratic primary results
Party	Candidate	Votes	%
Democratic	Chet Blaylock	1,446	100.00%
Total votes		1,446	100.00%

Republican primary results
Party	Candidate	Votes	%
Republican	Kenneth G. Hageman	632	100.00%
Total votes		632	100.00%

General election results
Party	Candidate	Votes	%
Democratic	Chet Blaylock	2,848	55.08%
Republican	Kenneth G. Hageman	2,323	44.92%
Total votes		5,171	100.00%
Democratic hold			

=== District 36 ===
Democratic primary results
Party	Candidate	Votes	%
Democratic	Max Conover	1,966	59.29%
Democratic	Don Scanlin	1,350	40.71%
Total votes		3,316	100.00%

Republican primary results
Party	Candidate	Votes	%
Republican	L. M. "Larry" Aber (incumbent)	1,273	100.00%
Total votes		1,273	100.00%

General election results
Party	Candidate	Votes	%
Democratic	Max Conover	3,659	50.25%
Republican	L. M. "Larry" Aber (incumbent)	3,622	49.75%
Total votes		7,281	100.00%
Democratic gain from Republican			

=== District 37 ===
Democratic primary results
Party	Candidate	Votes	%
Democratic	Richard C. Parks	1,492	100.00%
Total votes		1,492	100.00%

Republican primary results
Party	Candidate	Votes	%
Republican	Pete Story (incumbent)	2,619	100.00%
Total votes		2,619	100.00%

General election results
Party	Candidate	Votes	%
Republican	Pete Story (incumbent)	3,988	58.45%
Democratic	Richard C. Parks	2,835	41.55%
Total votes		6,823	100.00%
Republican hold			

=== District 38 ===
Democratic primary results
Party	Candidate	Votes	%
Democratic	Paul F. Boylan (incumbent)	1,406	100.00%
Total votes		1,406	100.00%

General election results
Party	Candidate	Votes	%
Democratic	Paul F. Boylan (incumbent)	5,159	100.00%
Total votes		5,159	100.00%
Democratic hold			

=== District 40 ===
Democratic primary results
Party	Candidate	Votes	%
Democratic	Terry Murphy (incumbent)	2,679	100.00%
Total votes		2,679	100.00%

Republican primary results
Party	Candidate	Votes	%
Republican	Mike Anderson	873	62.54%
Republican	Jeff Lauderdale	523	37.46%
Total votes		1,396	100.00%

General election results
Party	Candidate	Votes	%
Republican	Mike Anderson	3,386	50.42%
Democratic	Terry Murphy (incumbent)	3,329	49.58%
Total votes		6,715	100.00%
Republican gain from Democratic			

=== District 43 ===
- District 43 held a special election to fill the last two years of a vacated term.

General election results
Party	Candidate	Votes	%
Democratic	Lawrence C. Stimatz	2,685	53.67%
Independent	Walter A. Richter	2,318	46.33%
Total votes		5,003	100.00%
Democratic hold			

=== District 44 ===
Democratic primary results
Party	Candidate	Votes	%
Democratic	John E. "Jack" Healy (incumbent)	2,434	100.00%
Total votes		2,434	100.00%

General election results
Party	Candidate	Votes	%
Democratic	John E. "Jack" Healy	3,673	100.00%
Total votes		3,673	100.00%
Democratic hold			

=== District 46 ===
Democratic primary results
Party	Candidate	Votes	%
Democratic	Fritz Tossberg	1,597	50.02%
Democratic	Russell J. Bergren	1,596	49.98%
Total votes		3,193	100.00%

Republican primary results
Party	Candidate	Votes	%
Republican	Elmer D. Severson	1,937	100.00%
Total votes		1,937	100.00%

General election results
Party	Candidate	Votes	%
Republican	Elmer D. Severson	4,738	56.26%
Democratic	Fritz Tossberg	3,684	43.74%
Total votes		8,422	100.00%
Republican gain from Democratic			

=== District 47 ===
Democratic primary results
Party	Candidate	Votes	%
Democratic	Bill Norman (incumbent)	2,310	100.00%
Total votes		2,310	100.00%

Republican primary results
Party	Candidate	Votes	%
Republican	Thomas Payne	844	100.00%
Total votes		844	100.00%

General election results
Party	Candidate	Votes	%
Democratic	Bill Norman (incumbent)	3,239	52.88%
Republican	Thomas Payne	2,886	47.12%
Total votes		6,125	100.00%
Democratic hold			

=== District 48 ===
Democratic primary results
Party	Candidate	Votes	%
Democratic	Bob Palmer	1,696	60.57%
Democratic	Elmer Flynn (incumbent)	1,104	39.43%
Total votes		2,800	100.00%

General election results
Party	Candidate	Votes	%
Democratic	Bob Palmer	3,549	100.00%
Total votes		3,549	100.00%
Democratic hold			

=== District 50 ===
- District 50 held a special election to fill the last two years of a vacated term.

Democratic primary results
Party	Candidate	Votes	%
Democratic	Fred Van Valkenburg	987	37.96%
Democratic	Philip D. Campbell	947	36.42%
Democratic	James N. "Jim" Meinert	666	25.62%
Total votes		2,600	100.00%

Republican primary results
Party	Candidate	Votes	%
Republican	William E. "Bill" Murray (incumbent)	853	57.87%
Republican	Bradley J. Stoick	621	42.13%
Total votes		1,474	100.00%

General election results
Party	Candidate	Votes	%
Democratic	Fred Van Valkenburg	3,662	54.45%
Republican	William E. "Bill" Murray (incumbent)	3,064	45.55%
Total votes		6,726	100.00%
Democratic gain from Republican			

== See also ==
- 1978 United States elections
- 1978 United States Senate election in Montana
- 1978 United States House of Representatives elections in Montana
- 1978 Montana House of Representatives election
