= Senator Mazurek =

Senator Mazurek may refer to:

- Edward Mazurek (1938–2017), Maine State Senate
- Joseph P. Mazurek (1948–2012), Montana State Senate
