= Hazelbaker =

Hazelbaker is a surname. It may refer to:

- Frank A. Hazelbaker (1878–1939), American politician in Montana who served as Lieutenant Governor of Montana
- Frank W. Hazelbaker (1912–1990), American politician in the state of Montana
- Jeremy Hazelbaker (born 1987), American baseball outfielder
- Jill Hazelbaker, American communications executive, political campaign activist primarily for candidates of the U.S. Republican Party
