= Senator Keenan =

Senator Keenan may refer to:

- Bob Keenan (born 1952), Montana State Senate
- John F. Keenan (state senator) (born 1964), Massachusetts State Senate
- Luke A. Keenan (1872–1924), New York State Senate
- P. J. Keenan (1912–1979), Montana State Senate

== See also ==
- Senator Kenan (disambiguation)
