= Frank Hazelbaker =

Frank Hazelbaker may refer to:

- Frank A. Hazelbaker (1878–1939), American politician in the state of Montana
- Frank W. Hazelbaker (1912–1990), American politician in the state of Montana
