= Corey Stapleton =

American politician (born 1967)

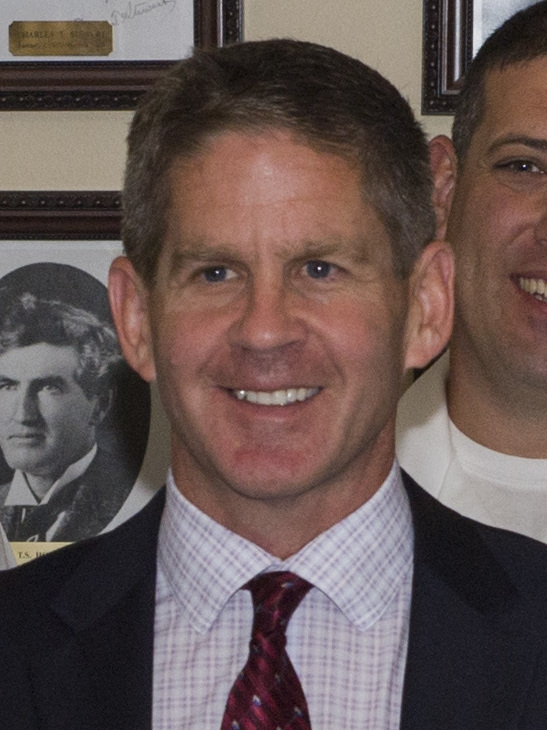
- Stapleton in 2017

21st Secretary of State of Montana
- In office January 2, 2017 – January 4, 2021
- Governor: Steve Bullock
- Preceded by: Linda McCulloch
- Succeeded by: Christi Jacobsen

Member of the Montana Senate from the 27th district
- In office 2001–2009
- Preceded by: Bruce Crippen
- Succeeded by: Gary Branae

Personal details
- Born: September 17, 1967 (age 59) Seattle, Washington, U.S.
- Party: Republican
- Education: United States Naval Academy (BS)
- Website: Official website

Corey Stapleton (born September 17, 1967) is an American politician and musician who served as the Secretary of State of Montana from 2017 to 2021. A Republican, he served as a member of the Montana State Senate from 2001 to 2009.

In 2020, Stapleton ran to represent Montana's at-large congressional district in the United States House of Representatives, but lost the Republican primary to Matt Rosendale. After losing the House race, Stapleton announced in 2021 his intention to pursue a career as a country singer. After expressing interest in a candidacy for president of the United States in the 2024 election, Stapleton became the first Republican office-holder to announce their run; he withdrew in October 2023 before the primaries.

== Early life, education and military service ==
Stapleton was born on September 17, 1967, in Seattle. Nominated by the Secretary of the Navy, he attended the Naval Academy Preparatory School in Newport, Rhode Island. Serving as battalion adjutant and earning the Most Inspirational Wrestler Award, he entered the United States Naval Academy in Annapolis, Maryland, where he earned a Bachelor of Science degree in engineering.

He served as a Surface Warfare Officer aboard the aircraft carrier USS John F. Kennedy (CV-67) and the Aegis cruiser USS Hué City (CG-66). He voluntarily resigned his naval commission in 1997 to work in Billings, Montana, as a financial advisor.

== Montana Senate ==
=== Elections ===
In 2000 he won a three-way Republican primary and then general election to become the first Generation X-er elected to the Montana Senate. In 2004, he won re-election to a second term, defeating Democrat Chris Daem 57%–43%.

=== Tenure ===
Stapleton was elected Minority Whip in 2006 until term-limited out of office in 2008. He served as Senate Minority Leader in the 2007 legislative session, which ended without a budget compromise between the Democratic-controlled senate and Republican-controlled House.

Stapleton sponsored several pieces of legislation including Otter Creek Coal development (SB409 2003) the attempted creation of a Montana medical school (SB273 2005) the Montana National Guard Relief Act (SB75) and the demand for reorganization and replacement of the Montana Department of Revenue's computer system POINTS (SB271 2003).

Stapleton served as chairman of the Montana Republican Legislative Campaign Committee, and advocated for the party's "Handshake with Montana" plan which he compared to the 1994 Republican Party "Contract with America". Montana Republicans gained the majority of the State House and shared control of the Montana State Senate with the Democratic Party in the 2006 election.

=== Committee assignments ===
- Finance and Claims
- Legislative Audit

== Campaigns for higher office ==
=== 2012 gubernatorial election ===
Stapleton ran for Governor of Montana with former state senator Bob Keenan as running mate in 2012. He lost to former U.S. Congressman Rick Hill, who won the seven-candidate Republican primary with a plurality of 34% of the vote. Stapleton ranked second with 18% of the vote, sixteen points behind Hill. He won only two counties in the state: Yellowstone (33%) and Treasure (29%).

=== 2014 U.S. Senate and U.S. House of Representatives elections ===
In early 2013, he decided to run for the U.S. Senate and challenge longtime Democratic incumbent Max Baucus. Stapleton criticized Baucus's record and started a petition to repeal Obamacare. In April 2013, Baucus decided to retire. After it became clear that freshman Representative Steve Daines would seek the Senate seat, Stapleton withdrew from the Senate race to instead run for Daines' seat in the House. Stapleton lost the Republican primary to Ryan Zinke.

=== 2020 U.S. House of Representatives election ===
On June 15, 2019, Stapleton announced his 2020 candidacy for the U.S. House of Representatives. He had initially been a candidate in the crowded 2020 Montana gubernatorial election. He lost the Republican primary to Matt Rosendale.

=== 2024 U.S. presidential election ===
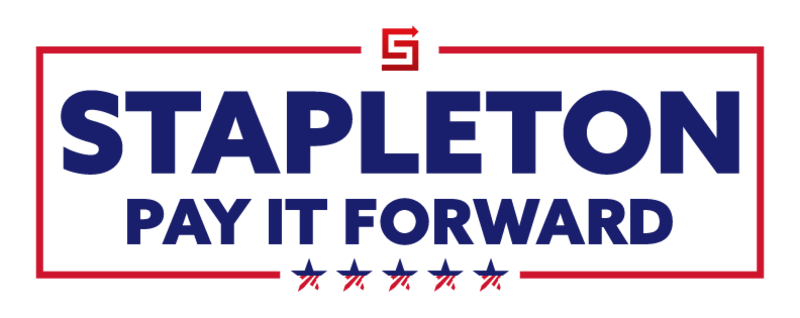
Stapleton's campaign logo

On March 10, 2022, Stapleton announced that he was "testing the waters" for a 2024 presidential campaign. Stapleton later confirmed he was running on November 11, 2022. He has been described as a "long-shot candidate" due to his lack of polling representation and media coverage. Stapleton has raised $7,717 total for his campaign, all through individual contributions, as of March 31, 2023. He withdrew from the election on October 13, 2023.

== Secretary of state ==
In July 2017, Stapleton said that there had been 360 cases of voter fraud in Montana in the 2017 special congressional election. When asked to substantiate his claims, Stapleton said that he had been "incorrectly" quoted by the Associated Press and Lee Newspapers.

In October 2018, Stapleton came under scrutiny after it was revealed that a Voter Guide written, published, and mailed by the Montana Secretary of State office had failed to distinguish what changes proposed ballot initiatives would make to existing laws through underlining additions and striking deletions, instead printing the new laws without these distinguishing marks. Stapleton's office awarded the $265,000 contract to print and mail the corrections to all Montana voters to Ultra Graphics, a firm run by former state Republican Party Executive Director Jake Eaton. Stapleton claimed that Eaton's company was awarded the contract because it had submitted the lowest bid. After news reports indicated that a company in Arizona had submitted a bid for less money, Stapleton stated that the Eaton-led firm's bid was the cheapest, because it was the only one able to complete the printing and mailing on time due to being in Montana.

In June 2019, in response to a legislative audit that found he was improperly commuting in a state vehicle, Stapleton's staff claimed that he was not commuting but "teleworking." The matter was turned over to the Helena Police Department. A city attorney refused to file charges, referring to the expiration of a one year statute of limitations, although an AP investigation alleged further potential violations occurring after the period of the audit.

In February 2019, Stapleton was fined $4,000 by Montana's Commissioner of Political Practices for four separate violations of State law in using resources from his secretary of state office to announce his gubernatorial campaign.

== Personal life ==
Stapleton married his wife Terry in 1992 in Great Falls. They had four children. The couple divorced in 2021. Stapleton has served on various community boards including Montana Manufacturing Extension board, Rotary, American Legion, and the Montana School for the Deaf and Blind foundation. Stapleton is part of country music band Corey Stapleton & The Pretty Pirates and released albums as recently as 2022.

Montana Senate
Preceded by Bruce Crippen	Member of the Montana Senate from the 10th district 2001–2005	Succeeded by Don Ryan
Preceded by Ken Toole	Member of the Montana Senate from the 27th district 2005–2009	Succeeded by Gary Branae
Political offices
Preceded by Linda McCulloch	Secretary of State of Montana; 2017–2021	Succeeded by Christi Jacobsen
