= Senator Moore =

Senator Moore may refer to:

== Members of the Australian Senate ==
- Claire Moore (politician) (born 1956), Australian Senator from Queensland from 2002 to 2019

== Members of the Canadian Senate ==
- Wilfred Moore (born 1942), Canadian Senator from Nova Scotia from 1996 to 2017

== Members of the United States Senate ==
- A. Harry Moore (1879–1952), U.S. Senator from New Jersey from 1935 to 1938
- Andrew Moore (politician) (1752–1821), U.S. Senator from Virginia in 1804
- Edward H. Moore (1871–1950), U.S. Senator from Oklahoma from 1943 to 1949
- Gabriel Moore (1785–1845), U.S. Senator from Alabama from 1831 to 1837

== United States state senate members ==
- Alfred Moore (1755–1810), North Carolina State Senate
- Carolyn Conn Moore (1904–1986), Kentucky State Senate
- Danny Roy Moore (1925–c. 2020), Louisiana State Senate
- Darius A. Moore (1833–1905), New York State Senate
- David Moore (military officer) (1817–1893), Missouri State Senate
- Don Moore (politician) (1928–2017), Tennessee State Senate
- Don A. Moore (Illinois politician) (1928–2012), Illinois State Senate
- Edward E. Moore (died 1940), Indiana State Senate
- Frank A. Moore (1844–1918), Oregon State Senate
- Frederick Moore (politician) (fl. 2010s), Montana State Senate
- Garry Moore (South Dakota politician) (born 1949), South Dakota State Senate
- George DeGraw Moore (1822–1891), Wisconsin State Senate
- Gwen Moore (born 1951), Wisconsin State Senate
- Harvey T. Moore (1809–1878), Wisconsin State Senate
- Hugh H. Moore (1844–after 1920), New York State Senate
- Jim Moore (Montana politician) (born 1927), Montana State Senate
- John Isaac Moore (1856–1937), Arkansas State Senate
- John J. Moore (1920–1976), New York State Senate
- John Moore (Illinois) (1793–1866), Illinois State Senate
- Joseph B. Moore (Michigan judge) (1845–1930), Michigan State Senate
- Luther Moore (1821–1892), Maine State Senate
- Marilyn Moore (politician) (born 1948), Connecticut State Senate
- Michael J. Moore (born 1968), Georgia State Senate
- Michael O. Moore (born 1963), Massachusetts State Senate
- Orren C. Moore (1839–1893), New Hampshire State Senate
- Oscar F. Moore (1817–1885), from Ohio State Senate
- Richard T. Moore (born 1943), Massachusetts State Senate
- Samuel B. Moore (1789–1846), Alabama State Senate
- Tommy Moore (politician) (born 1950), South Carolina State Senate
- Tony P. Moore (fl. 1970s–2010s), North Carolina State Senate
- William Hickman Moore (1861–1946), Washington State Senate
- William J. Moore (1923–2015), Pennsylvania State Senate
- William T. Moore (Texas politician) (1918–1999), Texas State Senate
- William Moore (congressman) (1810–1878), New Jersey State Senate

== See also ==
- Wyman B. S. Moor (1811–1869), U.S. Senator from Maine in 1848
- John T. More (1771–1857), New York State Senate
