= Senator Berg =

Senator Berg may refer to:

- Charles A. Berg (1927–2014), Minnesota State Senate
- Harry Berg (1943–2020), Montana State Senate
- Julius S. Berg (1893–1938), New York State Senate
- Karen Berg (politician) (born 1961), Kentucky State Senate
