= Senator Hazelbaker =

Senator Hazelbaker may refer to:

- Frank A. Hazelbaker (1878–1939), Montana State Senate
- Frank W. Hazelbaker (1912–1990), Montana State Senate
