= Frank I. Haswell =

American judge (1918–1990)

Frank Irvin Haswell (April 6, 1918 – March 12, 1990) was appointed as an associate justice of the Montana Supreme Court, serving in that capacity from 1967 to 1978, and as chief justice from 1978 to 1985. Haswell served as Montana District Court Judge in the 11th Judicial District from 1958 until 1967.

He was born in Great Falls, Montana and attended Montana State University from 1937 to 1939. He graduated in 1941 with a B.A. in economics from the University of Washington. He served in the United States Marine Corps for three years in World War II. He received his LL.B. degree from the University of Montana in 1947.

The State Bar of Montana gives the Frank I. Haswell Award to an attorney for the best contribution to the Montana Lawyer, a publication of the Bar.

He was married to June Petersen (née Arnold) and has four sons: Larry (stepson), Frank, Bruce, and Jack.

Political offices
Preceded by Hugh R. Adair	Justice of the Montana Supreme Court; 1967–1985	Succeeded by Jean A. Turnage
Preceded by Paul G. Hatfield	Chief Justice of the Montana Supreme Court; 1978-1985	Succeeded by Jean A. Turnage
