= Gary Branae =

American politician

Member of the Montana Senate from the 27th district
- In office January 5, 2009 – January 7, 2013
- Preceded by: Corey Stapleton
- Succeeded by: Elsie Arntzen

Personal details
- Born: March 20, 1944 (age 82) Big Timber, Montana
- Party: Democratic Party
- Spouse: Linda
- Education: Montana State University
- Profession: Educator

Gary H. Branae is a Democratic Party member of the Montana Senate. He has represented Senate District 27 for Billings, Montana since 2009. He was a member of the Montana House of Representatives, representing District 54 from 2000 to 2009.
