= Senator Kenan =

Senator Kenan may refer to:

- Augustus Holmes Kenan (1805–1870), Georgia
- James Kenan (1740–1810), North Carolina State Senate
- Thomas S. Kenan (1771–1843), North Carolina

== See also ==
- Senator Keenan (disambiguation)
