= Kris Hansen =

American politician (1969–2022)

Member of the Montana House of Representatives from the 33rd district
- In office 2011–2015

Personal details
- Born: December 21, 1969 Peoria, Illinois
- Died: July 7, 2022 (aged 52)
- Party: Republican
- Education: Augustana College (Illinois); The John Marshall Law School
- Profession: Attorney

Kris Hansen (December 21, 1969 – July 7, 2022) was an American politician who was a Republican member of the Montana Legislature. She was elected in 2010 to House District 33 which represents the Havre and Western Hill County area. In 2014, she won election to the Montana Senate District 14, unseating Democratic incumbent Greg Jergeson, with 4,080 to his 3,196. She resigned in 2016 to become chief legal counsel for the state auditor's office, and was replaced by fellow Republican Russ Tempel.

Hansen served in the national guard, and was a veteran of the Iraq war. She died on July 7, 2022, at the age of 52.
