= Rick Reese =

American environmental activist

- Born: Richard Langton Reese; February 16, 1942; Utah, United States
- Died: January 9, 2022; Bozeman, Montana
- Education: B.S., University of Utah (1966); graduate degree at Josef Korbel School of International Studies
- Occupations: Environmental activist, alpinist
- Employer(s): Greater Yellowstone Coalition; National Park Service
- Known for: Founder of Greater Yellowstone Coalition, President of Greater Yellowstone Coalition, Director of the Yellowstone Institute

Richard Langton Reese (February 16, 1942- January 9, 2022) was an environmental activist who founded the Greater Yellowstone Coalition and an alpinist who participated in the North Face Grand Teton rescue in 1967.

== Early life and work ==
Reese was born in Salt Lake City, Utah, in 1942 to John Heber Reese II and Sara Langton. He graduated from East High School and joined the National Guard in fall 1960. He served six months active duty, returned home for three months, and spent another year overseas on active duty in 1961 in response to the Berlin Crisis. Reese then earned a bachelor of science from the University of Utah in 1966 before moving to Denver to complete a graduate degree at the Josef Korbel School of International Studies, where he was a Woodrow Wilson Fellow.

Reese worked as a Climbing Ranger at Jenny Lake in Grand Teton National Park in the 1960s during his years as a graduate and undergraduate student. After completing his degrees, he moved to Montana and began teaching political science as an assistant professor at Carroll College in 1970.

== Environmental career ==
In 1980, Reese and his wife Mary Lee were hired by Yellowstone National Park Superintendent John Townsley to run the Yellowstone Institute (now Yellowstone Forever), a non-profit organization that teaches the public about Yellowstone National Park. In 1981, Townsley and Reese began discussing the need to "manage the greater Yellowstone area." Reese began planning for a new organization to protect Yellowstone National Park in late 1982. The Greater Yellowstone Coalition was officially incorporated on November 7, 1983, and Reese served as founding president for the next two years.

In later years, Reese served as Deputy Director of the State Commission on Local Government, Executive Secretary to the Montana Board of Public Education, and director of the Yellowstone Institute. In 1985, he moved back to Salt Lake City to "run an outfit called the Utah Geographic Series, a series of five books about Utah." In 1989, Reese took a job as the Director of Community Relations at the University of Utah, where he worked until his retirement in 2003. He also chaired the Bonneville Shoreline Trail Committee for twenty years, an environmental effort that he helped found.

== Alpinist career ==
Reese became interested in climbing when he saw the film The Conquest of Everest in 1954 at the age of 11. In 1959, he and a group of friends decided to climb Mount Rainier. At the time, they were the youngest ever unguided group to summit the peak. Later, Reese was contacted by the Alpenbock Climbing Club at Olympus High School, which marked his entry into the climbing world.

Reese and his friends spent a great deal of time climbing in the Wasatch Range and other areas around Utah, and Reese gained a reputation as a skilled alpinist. He used his climbing skills during his career as a ranger. In 1967, he participated in a North Face rescue on the Grand Teton with several other students, which is discussed in the documentary The Grand Rescue. The film and rescue itself became famous in the climbing community. During his years in Montana, Reese climbed all over the state and continued rescuing in Grand Teton National Park.

== Personal life ==
Rick Reese married his wife Mary Lee sometime before October 1970, when the couple's first child, a daughter named Paige, was born. In 1972, they had another child, a son named Seth.

== Later years ==
In 2004, Reese retired from public life and returned to Bozeman, Montana. He served on the board of Mountain Journal, a non-profit and environmentally-focused publication that he helped found. Reese also served as the co-chair for the Bonneville Shoreline Preservation group and worked to create the Bonneville Shoreline Trail. He donated his papers to Montana State University, which are now held at the Montana State University Library's Merrill G. Burlingame Archives and Special Collections. In 2009, Reese briefly re-emerged from retirement to serve as the interim executive of the Greater Yellowstone Coalition .

== Publications ==
- Reese, Rick. Greater Yellowstone: the National Park and Adjacent Wildlands. Helena, Mont: Montana Magazine, 1991.
- Reese, Rick. Montana Mountain Ranges. Helena, MT: Montana Magazine, 1985.
- Reese, Rick. Interview with David F. DeLap : February 23, 1980, Bozeman, Montana. Salt Lake City, UT: Rick Reese, 2004.
