= Gary Aklestad =

American politician

Member of the Montana Senate
- In office 1977–1997

Personal details
- Born: December 9, 1932 (age 93) Shelby, Montana, U.S.
- Party: Republican
- Spouse: Beth
- Occupation: farmer, rancher

Gary C. Aklestad (born December 9, 1932) is an American politician in the state of Montana. He served in the Montana Senate from 1977 to 1997. In 1997 he served as President of the Senate and in 1995 he was President pro tempore. He also served as minority leader in 1987.
