= Fred Carl (politician) =

American politicians

Member of the Montana Senate from the 47th district
- In office 1973–1977

Personal details
- Party: Republican
- Education: University of Montana
- Website: carl4mtstatesenate.com

Fred Carl is an American politician. He served as a Republican member of the Montana Legislature from 1971 through 1974. In 2012, Fred Carl announced he would run for Montana Senate District 47, which represents a portion of the Missoula area.

== Political history ==
=== 2004 election ===
Fred Carl ran for election in 2004 against Jim Elliott, the incumbent Democrat. Carl lost the election to Elliott. Following the election, Elliott filed a complaint against Carl, alleging that cards distributed by his campaign misrepresented Elliott's voting record and violated Montana law. In 2006, the Commissioner of Political Practices agreed with this assertion and found Carl's campaign to be in violation.

=== 2012 election ===
Fred Carl ran for election in 47th district of the Montana Senate in 2012. He was unopposed in the primary. He was running against Dick Barrett, the Democratic candidate, for an open seat. Carl lost the election to Barrett.
