= Jesse O'Hara =

American politician

Jesse O’Hara

Member of the Montana House of Representatives from the 18th district
- In office 2007 to present

Personal details
- Born: November 15, 1943 (age 82) Laramie, Wyoming
- Party: Republican
- Spouse: Julie O’Hara

Jesse O’Hara (born November 15, 1943) was a Republican member of the Montana Legislature. In 2006 he was elected to House District 18 which represents the Great Falls, Montana area. He also served in the 2008, 2010, and 2012 terms. These four terms are the maximum for Montana term limit.

He previously served in the Senate during the 1979 and 1981 legislative sessions. He also was a house representative for the 1985 session.
