= Terry Murphy (American politician) =

American politician

Terry L. Murphy
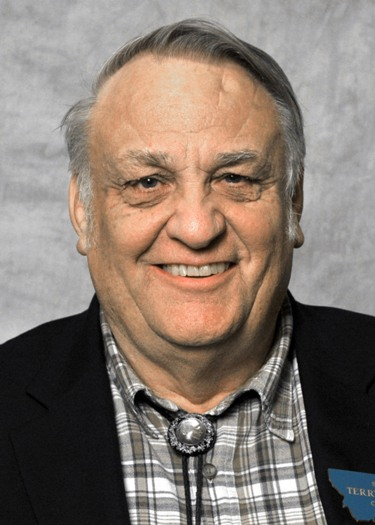

Member of the Montana Senate from the 39th district
- In office 2006 to ???

Personal details
- Born: 1942 or 1943 (age 82–83) Jefferson County, Montana
- Party: Republican
- Occupation: Wheat farmer

Terry L. Murphy is a Republican member of Montana Legislature. He was elected for Senate District 39, representing the Cardwell, Montana area. He previously served the House of Representative in 1971.
