= Bruce Crippen =

American politician

Member of the Montana State Senate
- In office 1980–2000

Personal details
- Born: June 13, 1932 (age 94) Billings, Montana, U.S.
- Party: Republican
- Spouse: Mary Olga Christensen (c.1962–2014; her death)
- Children: four
- Education: University of Montana; New York University

Bruce D. Crippen (born June 13, 1932) was a Republican Party State Senator in the Montana Legislature. He represented district 10 Yellowstone.

Crippen attended the University of Montana and received a B.A. in Accounting in 1956 and a Juris Doctor 1959. He is the only senator from Yellowstone County to be named president of the Montana State Senate, serve as minority whip, minority leader, and president pro tempore.

He and his wife, Mary, have four children: Ken, Gretchen, Kirsten, and Clay. Mary died in 2014 of pancreatic cancer.
