= Fred Van Valkenburg =

American politician

Member of the Montana Senate
- In office 1979–1998

Personal details
- Born: May 3, 1948 (age 78) Denver, Colorado, U.S.
- Party: Democratic
- Education: University of Montana
- Occupation: lawyer

Fred R. Van Valkenburg (born May 3, 1948) is an American politician in the state of Montana. He served in the Montana Senate from 1979 to 1998. In 1993 he was President of the Senate, and in 1985, 1987, and 1991 he was majority leader of the Senate. An attorney, Van Valkenburg attended the University of Montana, earning his J.D. degree in 1973. From 1998 to 2014, he was the county attorney for Missoula County, Montana. He has also served as an assistant city attorney of Missoula, a contract public defender for Missoula County and a deputy county attorney of Missoula County.

== 2012 Department of Justice Investigation ==
In 2012 the United States Department of Justice opened an investigation into alleged mishandling of rape and sexual assault cases by Van Valkenberg's Missoula County Attorney's Office. Many of the cases involved students at the University of Montana. This included allegations of gang rape brought against University of Montana Grizzlies football players. The Department of Education would later open an investigation regarding the sexual assault issues within the football team. According to the DOJ, the County Attorney's Office rarely explained why they failed to prosecute offenders even when police investigators had found strong evidence of guilt. Van Valkenburg refused to cooperate with the DOJ investigation, going as far as to file a declaratory judgment to stop the investigation. In February 2014 the DOJ released a report stating that investigators had found "substantial evidence of gender bias" in the Missoula County Attorney's Office which amounted to a violation of federal law, including the Equal Protection Clause of the 14th Amendment. Acting Assistant Attorney General Jocelyn Samuels for the Civil Rights Division stated: "We uncovered evidence of a disturbing pattern of deficiencies in the handling of these cases by the County Attorney’s Office, a pattern that not only denies victims meaningful access to justice, but places the safety of all women in Missoula at risk. We hope that this letter will enable us to move forward with constructive discussions with the County Attorney to resolve these serious concerns." In June 2014 the DOJ entered into an agreement with the Missoula County Attorney's Office to implement changes in an effort to eliminate gender bias in the Office's response to sexual assault.
