= P. J. Keenan =

American politician (1912–1979)

Chair of Deer Lodge County Democratic Central Committee
- In office 1975-1979

Member of the Montana State Senate
- In office 1967–1974

School District 10 Board Member

Member of Anaconda, Montana City Council from the 6th Ward

Personal details
- Born: Patrick John Keenan; October 12, 1912 Butte, Montana, U.S.
- Died: September 14, 1979 (aged 66) Anaconda, Montana, U.S.
- Party: Democratic
- Spouse: Ann
- Children: five
- Occupation: boilermaker, bartender

Patrick John Keenan (October 12, 1912 – September 14, 1979), commonly known as P. J. "Squeek" Keenan, was an American politician in the state of Montana. A Democrat, he served in the Montana Senate from 1967 to 1974 and was president pro tempore in 1974.

Keenan was born in Butte and was educated in local schools of the Anaconda area. He then attended Mount Angel College in Oregon for two years. Of Irish descent, he was married to Ann and with her had five children, including Nancy Keenan. He worked for The Anaconda Company and also served on the School District 10 Board of Trustees, as well as the Anaconda City Council for the sixth ward. In the State Senate, Keenan served on the Legislative Council as well as on the Journal committee and Local Government subcommittee as chairman. He was also vice chairman of the bills committee and Home Rule subcommittee, as well as a member of the education, fish and game and constitutional, elections and federal relations committees. In the 1974 session, he served as president pro tempore of the Senate. In 1975, Keenan was named chairman of the Deer Lodge County Democratic Central Committee. He died of a heart attack in 1979.
