= Neil Lynch (politician) =

American politician in Montana (born 1934)

Neil J. Lynch

Personal details
- Born: September 18, 1934 (age 92) Butte, Montana, U.S.
- Party: Democratic
- Relations: Brilee Gallup(granddaughter) Ellis Griswold (grandson)
- Education: Catholic University of America
- Occupation: lawyer

Neil J. Lynch (born September 18, 1934) is an American politician in the state of Montana. He served in the Montana Senate and was its majority leader from 1973 to 1977. In 1976, he ran for a seat on the Montana Supreme Court, but was defeated by Democratic candidate Daniel J. Shea, in what was described as an upset.
