= Joseph P. Mazurek =

American politician

21st Attorney General of Montana
- In office January 4, 1993 – January 2, 2001

Member of the Montana State Senate
- In office 1981–1993

Personal details
- Born: July 27, 1948 San Diego, California, US
- Died: August 28, 2012 (aged 64) Helena, Montana, US
- Party: Democratic
- Spouse: Patty Mazurek
- Children: 3
- Parents: Thomas Mazurek (father); Priscilla Mazurek (mother)
- Education: University of Montana

Military service
- Allegiance: United States
- Branch/service: United States Army
- Years of service: 1970-1972
- Rank: First lieutenant

Joseph P. Mazurek (July 27, 1948 – August 28, 2012) was the 21st Attorney General of Montana and a Montana State Senator from 1981 to 1993.

== Early life ==
Mazurek was born on July 27, 1948, in San Diego, California. Mazurek's parents were Priscilla and Thomas Mazurek. When he was just nine months old, his parents moved to Helena, Montana. He graduated from Helena High School in 1966, after serving as its student body president.

== Education ==
In 1970, Mazurek earned a degree from University of Montana. In 1975, Mazurek earned a law degree from University of Montana School of Law.

== Career ==
=== Military service ===
Mazurek served in the United States Army for two years between 1970 and 1972. He had the rank of First Lieutenant.

=== State Senator (1981-1993) ===
In 1980, Mazurek was elected to the Montana State Senate from the 16th district. In 1984, after redistricting, he was elected to the 23rd district. In 1988 he was re-elected. In 1991 he was appointed to be the president of the Montana State Senate.

=== Montana Attorney General (1993-2001) ===
On November 3, 1992, Mazurek was elected Montana Attorney General. He won the race by 13.74 percent against Jack Sands. He was reelected by 21.09 percent four years later, against Larry L. Baer.

=== 2000 Montana Governor Democratic Primary ===
Mazurek lost in the primary to Mark O'Keefe.

== Election history ==
Democratic Party primary results
Party	Candidate	Votes	%
Democratic	Mark O'Keefe	46,294	48.04
Democratic	Joseph Mazurek	34,385	35.69
Democratic	Mike Cooney	15,677	16.27
Total votes		96,356	100.00

== Personal life ==
On June 13, 1970, he married his wife Patty. He had three children, Tom, Jeff, and Dan.

Mazurek died on August 28, 2012, at the age of 64.

=== Legacy ===
The Montana Supreme Court building was renamed in his honor as The Joseph P. Mazurek Justice Building.
