= Jim Moore (politician) =

American politician

Personal details
- Born: Perry James Moore III; December 21, 1927 Lewistown, Montana, U.S.
- Died: May 17, 2017 (aged 89) Bozeman, Montana, U.S.
- Party: Republican
- Spouse: Kathryn Nash
- Children: three
- Education: Montana State University
- Occupation: lawyer, rancher

Perry James Moore III (December 21, 1927 - May 19, 2017) was an American politician in the state of Montana. He served in the Montana Senate and was its minority leader from 1973 to 1974. Moore attended Montana State University and is an author, rancher and lawyer.
