= Harry Berg =

American politician (1943–2020)

Harry Kenneth Berg (December 9, 1943 – May 8, 2020) was an American educator and politician.

Berg lived on a ranch 17 miles south from Shawmut, Montana. He went to high school in Big Timber, Montana. Berg then served in the United States Army Reserve and was discharged in 1968. He received his bachelor's and master's degrees from Montana State University. He taught in the public schools in Great Falls, Montana and worked for H&R Block. Berg served in the Montana Senate from 1981 to 1985 and was a Democrat. Berg died at Peace Hospice in Great Falls, Montana.
