= Greg Jergeson =

American politician

Member of the Montana Senate from the 17th district
- In office 2013–2017
- Succeeded by: Mike Lang

Member of the Montana Public Service Commission
- In office 2003–2011

Member of the Montana Senate
- In office 1987–2003

Member of the Montana Senate
- In office 1975–1981

Personal details
- Born: December 29, 1950 (age 75)
- Party: Democratic Party
- Spouse: Barb
- Children: 2

Greg Jergeson (born December 29, 1950) is an American politician from the state of Montana. A member of the Democratic Party, Jergeson was formerly a member of the Montana Senate, representing the 17th district.

Jergeson was elected to the Montana Senate in 1974. He was defeated in a re-election bid in 1980. He was again elected to the Montana Senate in 1986. Jergeson was elected Majority Leader of the Montana Senate in 1993. He held his seat until 2002, when he was term limited out of office. Jergeson ran for the Montana Public Service Commission in the 2002 elections, and took office in 2003. He was reelected in 2006, and was again term limited from office in 2010. Jergeson ran for the Montana Senate in the 2012 elections, and was victorious. After a redistricting, he ran in the newly re-apportioned 14th Senate district, and was unseated by Republican challenger Kris Hansen.

Jergeson lives in Chinook, Montana, with his wife, Barb. They have two daughters. Jergeson has worked as the grants director at Montana State University-Northern.
