= Jean A. Turnage =

Native American judge (1926–2015)

Chief Justice of the Montana Supreme Court
- In office 1985–2000
- Preceded by: Frank I. Haswell
- Succeeded by: Karla M. Gray

Personal details
- Born: Jean Allen Turnage; March 10, 1926 St. Ignatius, Montana, U.S.
- Died: September 27, 2015 (aged 89)
- Children: 2
- Education: Montana State University
- Occupation: Judge

Military service
- Allegiance: United States
- Branch/service: United States Army (United States Army Air Corps)

Jean Allen Turnage (March 10, 1926 – September 27, 2015) was the chief justice of the Montana Supreme Court from 1985 until 2000.

== Early life and education ==
He was born in St. Ignatius, Montana. He served in the United States Army Air Corps after high school. He studied on the G.I. Bill at Montana State University, predecessor of the University of Montana.

Turnage was an enrolled citizen of the Confederated Salish & Kootenai Tribes of the Flathead Reservation. He had two children.

== Career ==
In 1952, he became Lake County's attorney. He served two years in the Montana House of Representatives and 20 years in the Montana State Senate including as senate president in 1981 session.

He ran successfully for Chief Justice of the Montana Supreme Court in 1984, serving two terms before retiring in January 2001.

Political offices
Preceded by Frank I. Haswell	Chief Justice of the Montana Supreme Court; 1985-2000	Succeeded by Karla M. Gray
