= Frank W. Hazelbaker =

American politician from Montana

Member of the Montana House of Representatives
- In office 1940–1947

Member of the Montana House of Representatives
- In office 1960–1964

Member of the Montana Senate
- In office 1966–1984

Personal details
- Born: August 5, 1912 Dillon, Montana, U.S.
- Died: March 16, 1990 (aged 77) Ronan, Montana, U.S.
- Party: Republican
- Spouse: Agnes Striker
- Occupation: Politician

Frank Woodworth Hazelbaker (August 5, 1912 – March 16, 1990) was an American politician in the state of Montana who served in the Montana House of Representatives and Montana State Senate. He was Speaker pro tempore of the House in 1945 and the Speaker of the House in 1963. His father, Frank A. Hazelbaker was a Lieutenant Governor of Montana, and his maternal grandfather, George E. Woodworth served in the Montana House of Representatives.
