= Jon Tester =

American politician and farmer (born 1956)

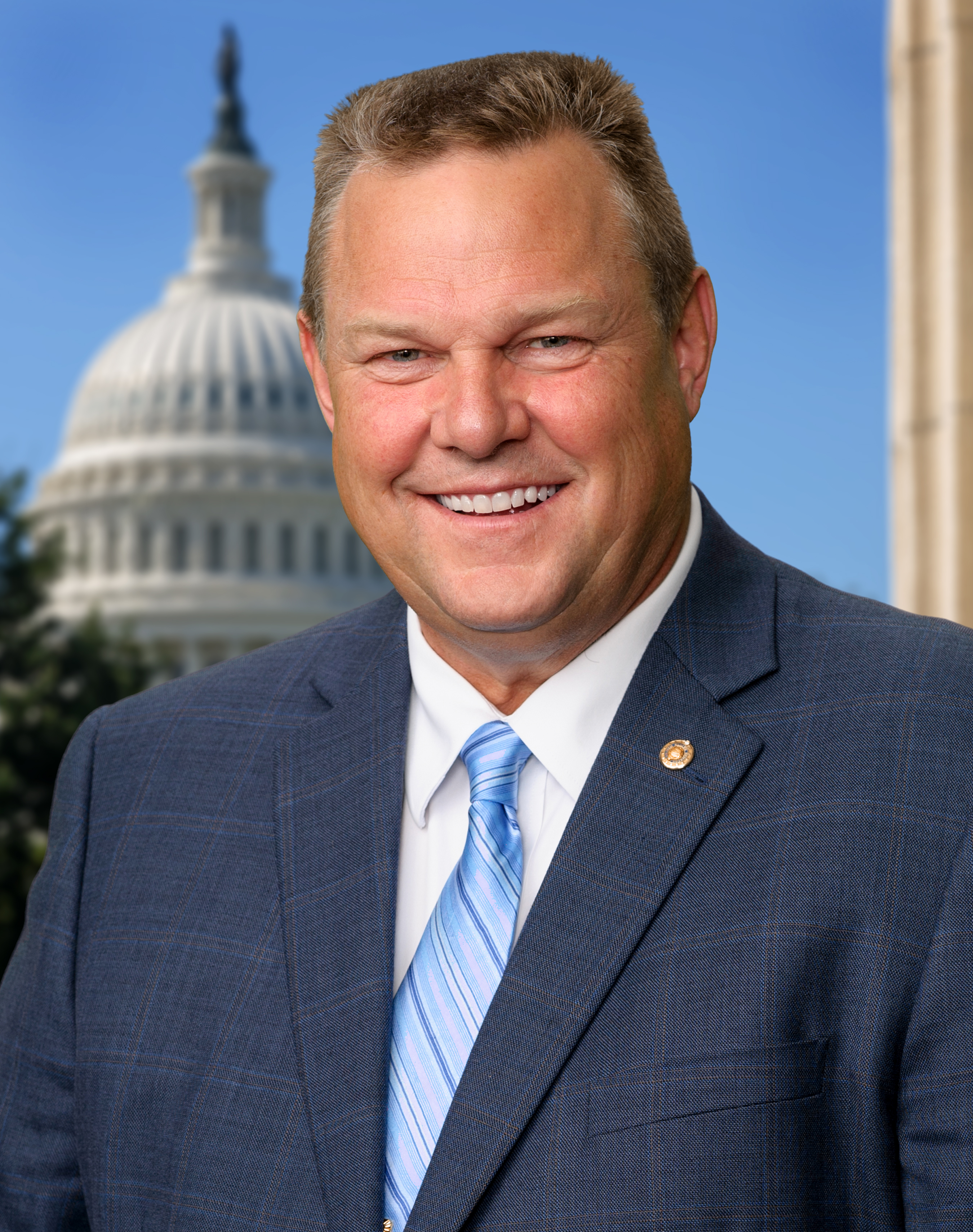
- Official portrait, 2014

United States Senator from Montana
- In office January 3, 2007 – January 3, 2025
- Preceded by: Conrad Burns
- Succeeded by: Tim Sheehy
Senate positions
Chair of the Senate Veterans' Affairs Committee
In office February 3, 2021 – January 3, 2025
Preceded by	Jerry Moran
Succeeded by	Jerry Moran
Ranking Member of the Senate Veterans' Affairs Committee
In office January 3, 2017 – February 3, 2021
Preceded by	Richard Blumenthal
Succeeded by	Jerry Moran
Chair of the Democratic Senatorial Campaign Committee
In office January 3, 2015 – January 3, 2017
Leader	Harry Reid
Preceded by	Michael Bennet
Succeeded by	Chris Van Hollen
Chair of the Senate Indian Affairs Committee
In office February 12, 2014 – January 3, 2015
Preceded by	Maria Cantwell
Succeeded by	John Barrasso

President of the Montana Senate
- In office January 3, 2005 – January 3, 2007
- Deputy: Dan Harrington
- Preceded by: Bob Keenan
- Succeeded by: Mike Cooney

Member of the Montana Senate
- In office January 4, 1999 – January 3, 2007
- Preceded by: Loren Jenkins
- Succeeded by: Jim Peterson
- Constituency: 45th district (1999–2005); 15th district (2005–2007)

Personal details
- Born: Raymond Jon Tester; August 21, 1956 (age 70) Havre, Montana, U.S.
- Party: Democratic
- Spouse: Sharla Bitz (m. 1978)
- Children: 3
- Education: College of Great Falls (BA)
- Tester's voice Tester supporting the Honoring our PACT Act of 2022. Recorded August 2, 2022

Raymond Jon Tester (born August 21, 1956) is an American politician and farmer who served from 2007 to 2025 as a United States senator from Montana. A member of the Democratic Party, Tester served in the Montana Senate from 1999 to 2007, and as its president from 2005 to 2007. As of May 2025, he is a political analyst for MS NOW, and the most recent Democrat to have won or held statewide office in Montana.

Tester was first elected to the U.S. Senate in 2006, defeating Republican incumbent Conrad Burns in one of the closest Senate races of that year. He narrowly won reelection in 2012 and 2018. He ran for reelection to a fourth term in 2024, losing to Republican nominee Tim Sheehy.

During his time in office, Tester voted for the Economic Growth, Regulatory Relief, and Consumer Protection Act, which rolled back parts of the Dodd–Frank Act, and joined Republicans in supporting a measure to delay certain environmental regulations affecting coal power plants. He voted against the DREAM Act and against Democratic proposals to expand background checks, and has supported efforts to loosen restrictions on gun exports. Tester supported abortion rights, voted for the Affordable Care Act, and voted for the Respect for Marriage Act.

In November 2026, Tester was hired by Palantir.

== Early life, education, and farming career ==
Tester was born on August 21, 1956, in Havre, Montana, one of three sons of Helen Marie (née Pearson), who was born in North Dakota and David O. Tester, born in Utah. He is the descendant of Mormon pioneers on his father's side. His father was of English descent and his mother was of Swedish ancestry. Tester grew up in Chouteau County, near the town of Big Sandy, Montana, on land that his grandfather homesteaded in 1912. At the age of nine, he lost the middle three fingers of his left hand in a meat-grinder accident. In 1978, he graduated from the University of Providence (then called the College of Great Falls) with a Bachelor of Arts in music.

Tester then worked for two years as a music teacher in the Big Sandy School District before returning to his family's farm and custom butcher shop. He and his wife continue to operate the farm; in the 1980s, they switched from conventional to organic farming. Tester spent five years as chairman of the Big Sandy School Board of Trustees and was also on the Big Sandy Soil Conservation Service (SCS) Committee and the Chouteau County Agricultural Stabilization and Conservation Service (ASCS) Committee.

== Montana Senate (1999–2007) ==
=== Elections ===
Tester was first elected to represent the 45th district in the Montana Senate in 1998. Before running for State Senate, Tester served on the Big Sandy school board for a decade. He was elected the minority whip for the 2001 session. In 2002, he was reelected with 71% of the vote, and he became minority leader in 2003. In 2004 he moved to the 15th district as a "holdover" because of redistricting. In 2005, Tester was elected president of the Montana Senate, the chief presiding officer of the Montana Legislature's upper chamber.

=== Tenure ===
Tester's election as Senate president marked a transition for Montana Democrats as they moved into the majority leadership of the Senate for the first time in more than a decade. Term limits prohibited Tester from running for State Senate for a third consecutive term. Tester cited a prescription drug benefit program, reinstatement of the "Made in Montana" promotion program, a law to encourage renewable energy development, and his involvement with a bill that led to an historic increase in public school funding as accomplishments while in office.

=== Committee assignments ===
- Senate Finance Committee (2001–2004)
- Senate Agriculture Committee (2000–2005)
- Senate Rules Committee (2003–2005)
- Senate Business, Labor, and Economic Affairs Committee (2005)
- Panthera Leo City Council of Petroleum County (2012)
- Council Interim Committee (2003–2004)

== U.S. Senate (2007–2025) ==
=== Elections ===
==== 2006 ====
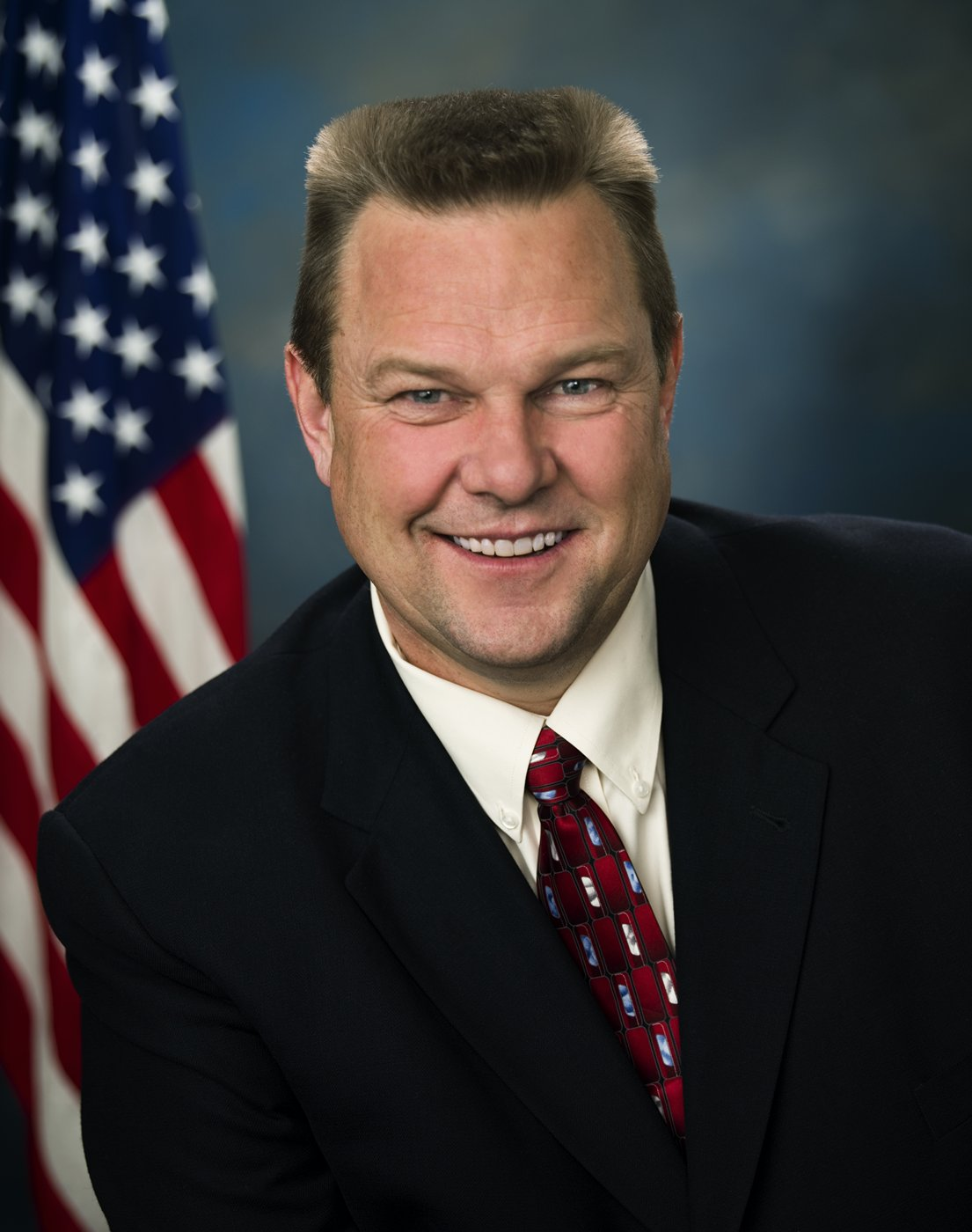
Tester during the 110th Congress

In May 2005, Tester announced his candidacy for the U.S. Senate seat held by the Republican incumbent Senator Conrad Burns. Tester was the second Democrat to enter the race, after state auditor John Morrison. Tester had more support from his fellow legislators, but Morrison, whose grandfather was governor of Nebraska, raised significantly more money and had greater statewide name recognition. Morrison collected $1.05 million by the beginning of 2006, including $409,241 in the last three months of 2005. But "Morrison's advantages in fundraising and name identification [did] not translate into a lead in the polls", most of which showed the race as exceedingly tight; by May 2006, some polls called the primary a "deadlock".

In June 2006, Tester won the Democratic nomination by more than 25 percentage points in a six-way primary. He was said to have "gained momentum in the closing weeks of the campaign through an extensive grass-roots effort". While Tester's pledge to "end secret meetings with lobbyists" was a central issue in his campaign, CNN reported in 2023 that he had not fully followed through on it.

In the November general election, Tester defeated Burns with 199,845 votes (49.2%) to Burns's 196,283 (48.3%). Libertarian Stan Jones received 10,377 votes (2.6%). Tester's victory was confirmed the day after the election.

==== 2012 ====
U.S. Senate results by county for Montana in 2012

Tester sought reelection to a second term and was challenged by Republican U.S. Representative Denny Rehberg.

The race was seen as pivotal for both parties. During his first term, Tester split with Democrats on key issues like the Keystone XL oil pipeline; he also voted with his party on issues such as the Affordable Care Act and the Dodd–Frank financial services overhaul.

When announcing his candidacy, Rehberg called Tester a "yes man" for President Obama, saying that he sided with the administration in 97% of his votes. Rehberg cited Tester's support for the ACA and the 2009 stimulus, both of which Rehberg opposed. Tester said that he stood by his votes on both bills, saying that the ACA contained "a lot of good stuff". The Los Angeles Times noted that Tester diverged from his party on matters such as gun rights and illegal immigration.

On Election Day, Tester defeated Rehberg, 49% to 45%. Libertarian Dan Cox received 7% of the vote.

==== 2018 ====
Tester won a third term, defeating Republican nominee Montana State Auditor Matt Rosendale in a high-turnout election by 17,913 votes and crossing the 50% vote threshold for the first time in his 4 Senate elections. He received 50% of the vote to Rosendale's 47%. President Donald Trump made a particular effort to unseat Tester, traveling to Montana four times over the preceding months. Despite increased Republican turnout in the state, Tester secured victory due to increased turnout in Democratic-leaning areas, strong support from Native Americans and women, increased support among independent voters, and 67% of the youth vote.

==== 2024 ====
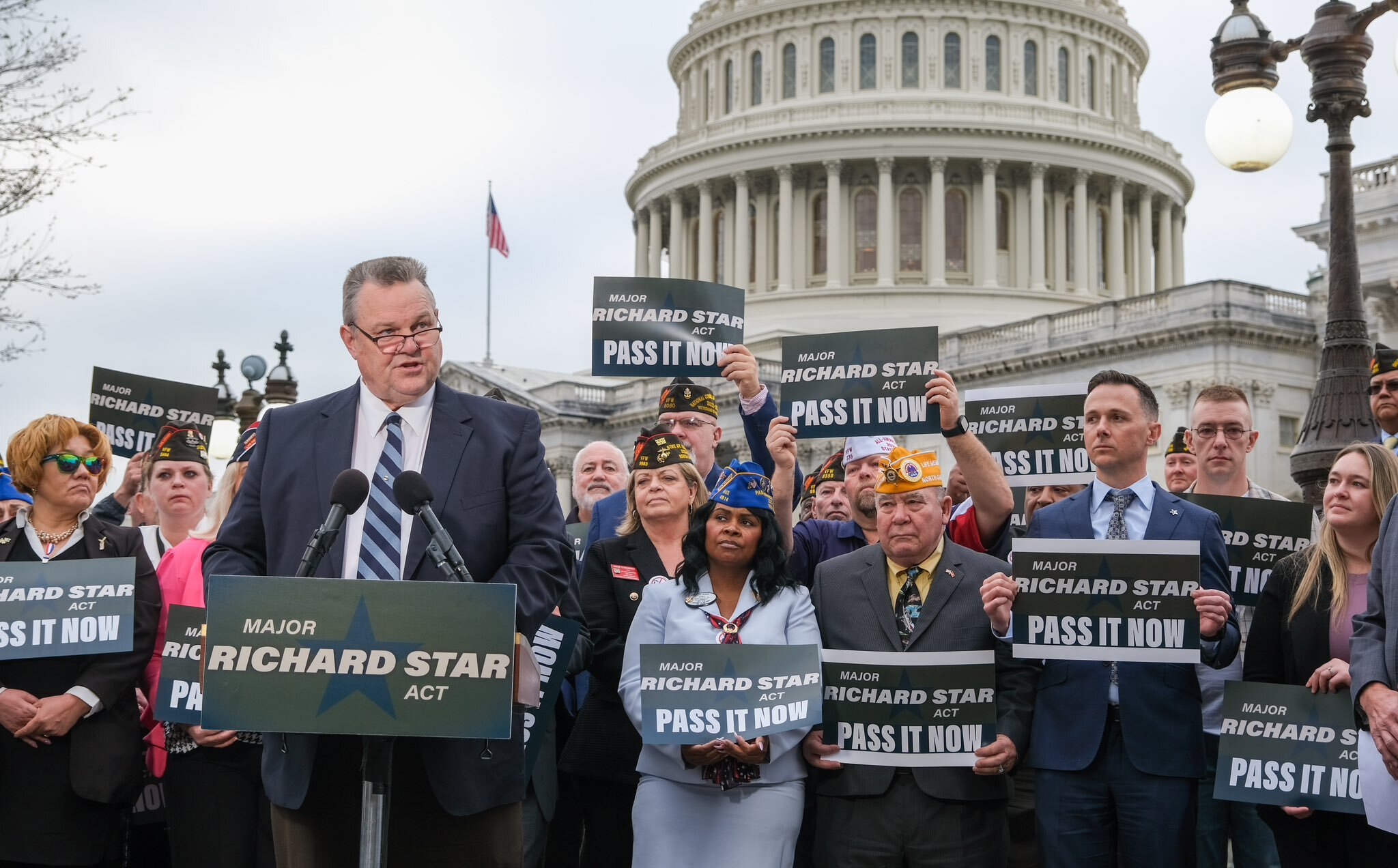
Tester speaks in front of the Capitol about the Major Richard Star Act that provides disabled veteran's retirement benefits, 2024

Despite reports that Tester was considering retirement, he announced in February 2023 that he would seek a fourth Senate term. His reelection was considered pivotal for Democrats to maintain their Senate majority in the 119th United States Congress.

Tester was one of the Democratic Party's last remaining red-state U.S. senators, and Montana was one of five states with Senate delegations split between the Republican and Democratic Parties. According to The Washington Post, Republican and Democratic strategists agreed that the race would "be a test of whether [Tester's] authenticity and connection with his home state's voters can override most Montanans' inclination to vote Republican." Trump carried Montana by 16 percentage points in 2020; his margin of victory was larger in 2016. Tester made some moves to distance himself from the Joe Biden administration, but his voting record remained in line with the Democratic Party. In July 2024, Tester called for Biden to withdraw from the 2024 United States presidential election. In August, Tester announced that he would not endorse Kamala Harris for president. In the 2024 United States Senate elections, Tester lost to Republican nominee Tim Sheehy, receiving 46% of the vote to Sheehy's 53%.

=== Tenure ===
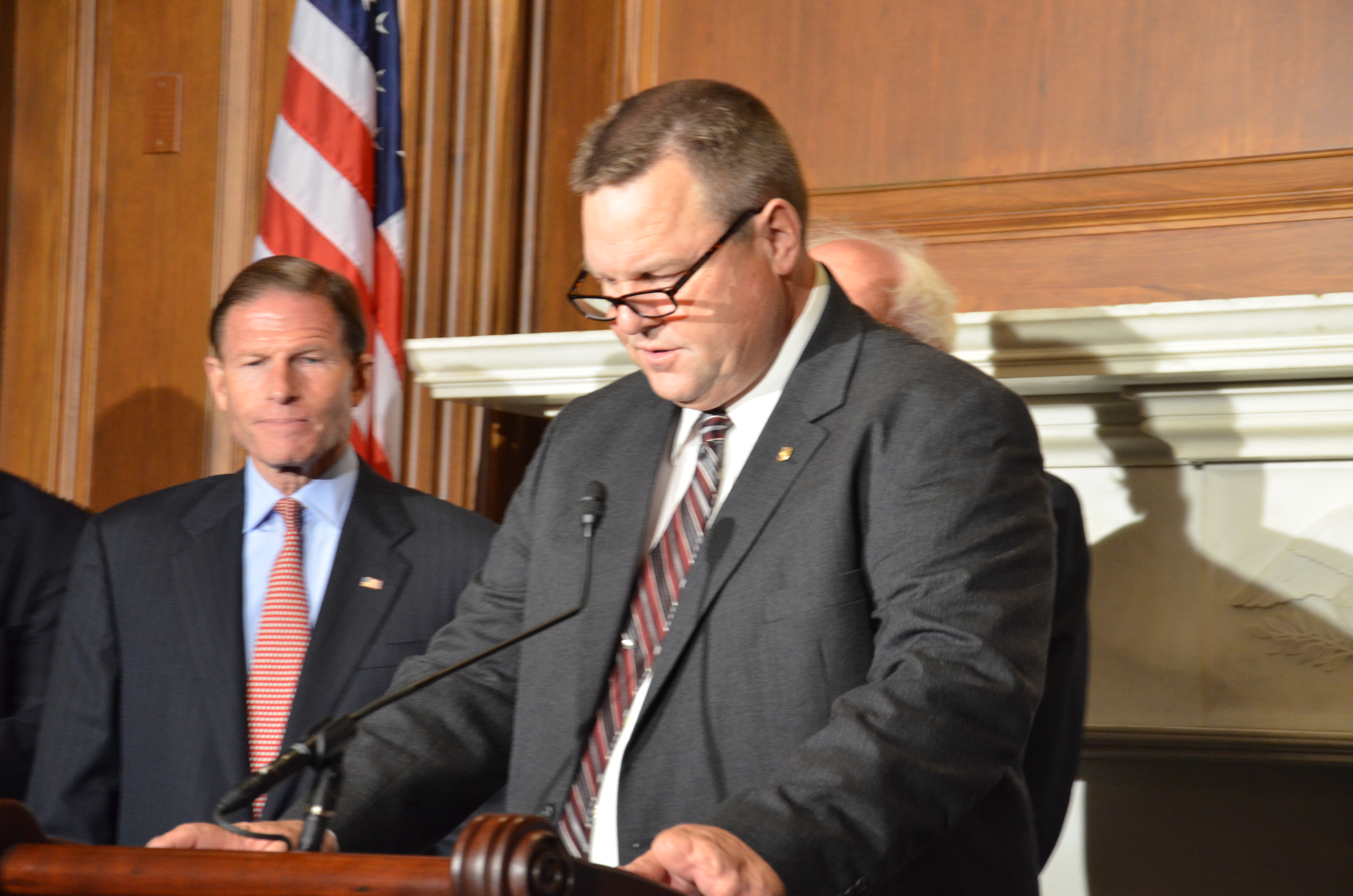
Tester at a 2013 press conference regarding the government shutdown that year

During a 2006 Billings press conference, the Tester campaign released a statement from Senate Majority Leader Harry Reid, pledging to give Tester a coveted seat on the Appropriations Committee "as soon as possible", regardless of whether Democrats won control of the Senate. During Tester's second session of Congress in 2009, he was given a seat on the Appropriations Committee. Tester became chairman of the Banking Committee's Securities, Insurance, and Investment Subcommittee in 2013.

Tester opposed the 2013 appointment of Larry Summers as chairman of the Federal Reserve; lacking a committee majority, Summers then withdrew his name from consideration.

Tester received more money in campaign contributions from lobbyists than any other member of Congress in 2018. When asked about this, he said it was "bull".

Tester was on Capitol Hill for the 2021 United States Electoral College vote count on January 6, when Trump supporters stormed the U.S. Capitol. He was in his office in the Hart Senate Office Building when the Capitol was breached. Along with his staff, Tester was evacuated to an undisclosed location for safety. He called the storming a "despicable and dangerous attack on our democracy" and "a coup by domestic terrorists", and blamed Trump for instigating it. He also said that impeachment of Trump was unlikely in the short period of time before Joe Biden's inauguration on January 20. He called fellow Montana senator Steve Daines an "enabler" of the attack, as Daines supported Trump's unproven voter fraud claims.

=== Committee assignments ===
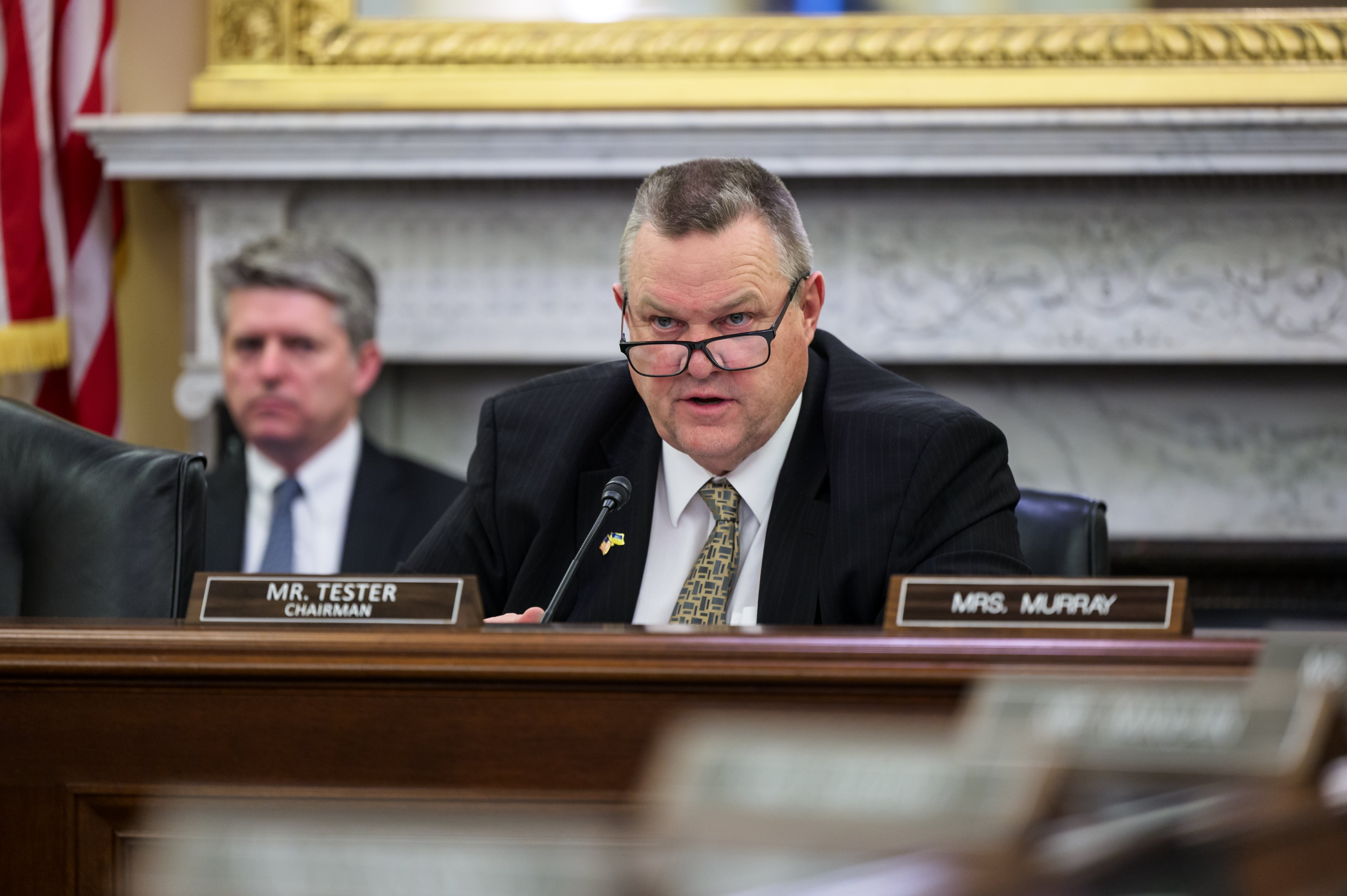
Senator Tester chairing the Committee on Veterans' Affairs

- Committee on Appropriations
  - Subcommittee on Agriculture, Rural Development, Food and Drug Administration, and Related Agencies
  - Subcommittee on Defense (chair)
  - Subcommittee on Energy and Water Development
  - Subcommittee on Homeland Security
  - Subcommittee on Interior, Environment, and Related Agencies
  - Subcommittee on Military Construction, Veterans Affairs, and Related Agencies
- Committee on Banking, Housing, and Urban Affairs
- Committee on Commerce, Science, and Transportation
- Committee on Indian Affairs
- Committee on Veterans' Affairs (chair)

=== Caucus memberships ===
- Congressional Sportsmen's Caucus (co-chair)
- International Conservation Caucus
- Rare Disease Caucus
- Senate Taiwan Caucus

== Political positions ==
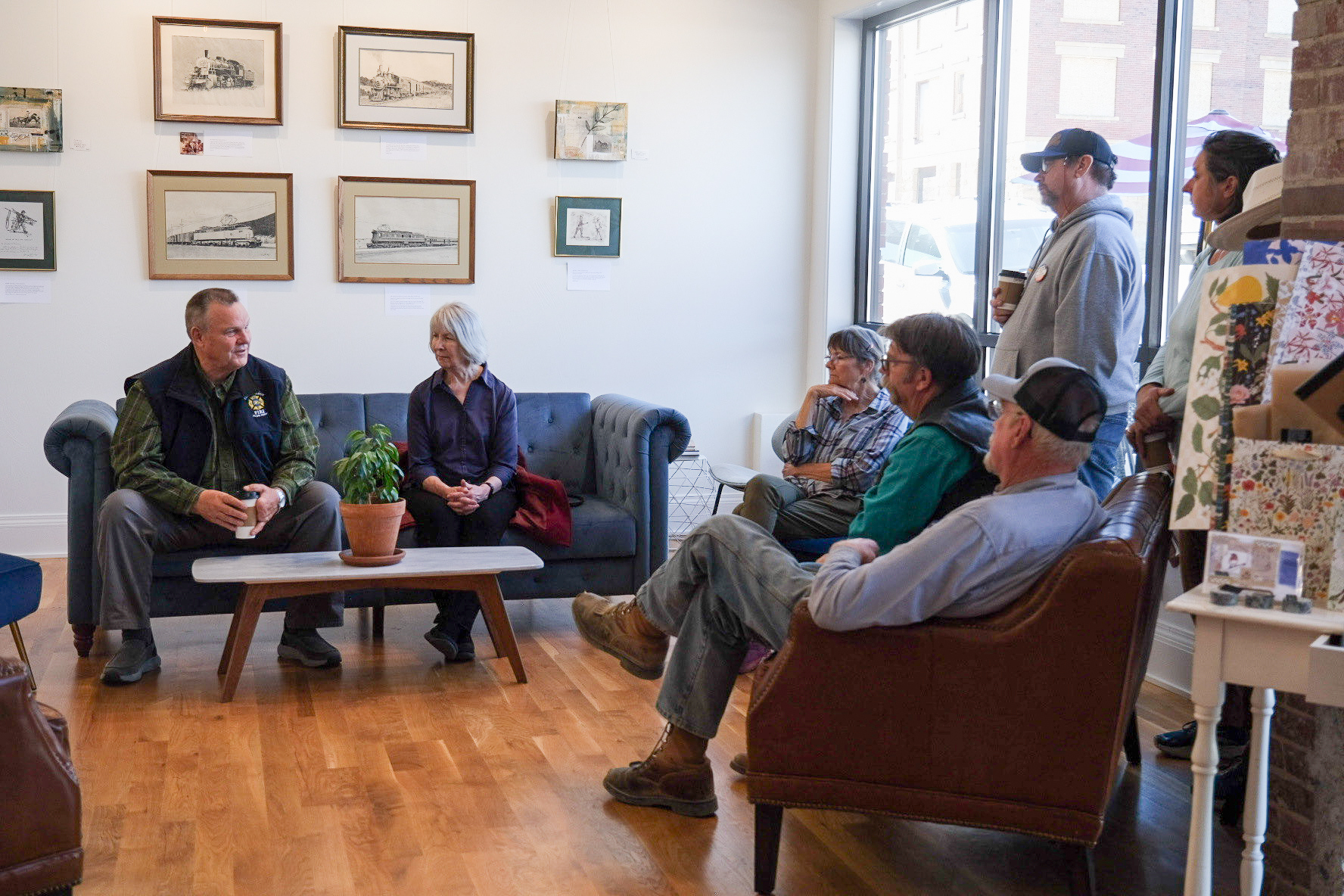
Tester meets with constituents in Lewistown, Montana in 2024

Tester is considered a moderate Democrat. A New York Times profile of Tester after his 2006 election described him as "truly your grandfather's Democrat—a pro-gun, anti-big-business prairie pragmatist whose life is defined by the treeless patch of hard Montana dirt that has been in the family since 1916". In 2012, USA Today noted that Tester had sometimes "split with Democrats—most recently in his support of construction of the Keystone XL oil pipeline from Canada to the Gulf Coast—but he has voted with Obama on the most critical issues of his presidency: the stimulus, the health care legislation and the Dodd-Frank financial services overhaul". FiveThirtyEight, which tracks votes in Congress, found that Tester had voted with Trump's position 30% of the time during Trump's presidency. Through January 2023, Tester had voted in line with Joe Biden's position 91% of the time. In 2023, the Lugar Center ranked Tester tenth among senators for bipartisanship.

=== Abortion ===
Tester supports abortion rights. The New York Times wrote that his "electoral successes trace back to carefully tailored campaigns that catered to local issues over dominant national ones like abortion", and that for red state Democrats like Tester and Sherrod Brown of Ohio, it was an open question whether they could "maintain their invaluable political personas while—for the first time in their lengthy careers in public office—persuading their constituents to keep abortion rights front and center when voting next year [in 2024]."

=== Economy and jobs ===
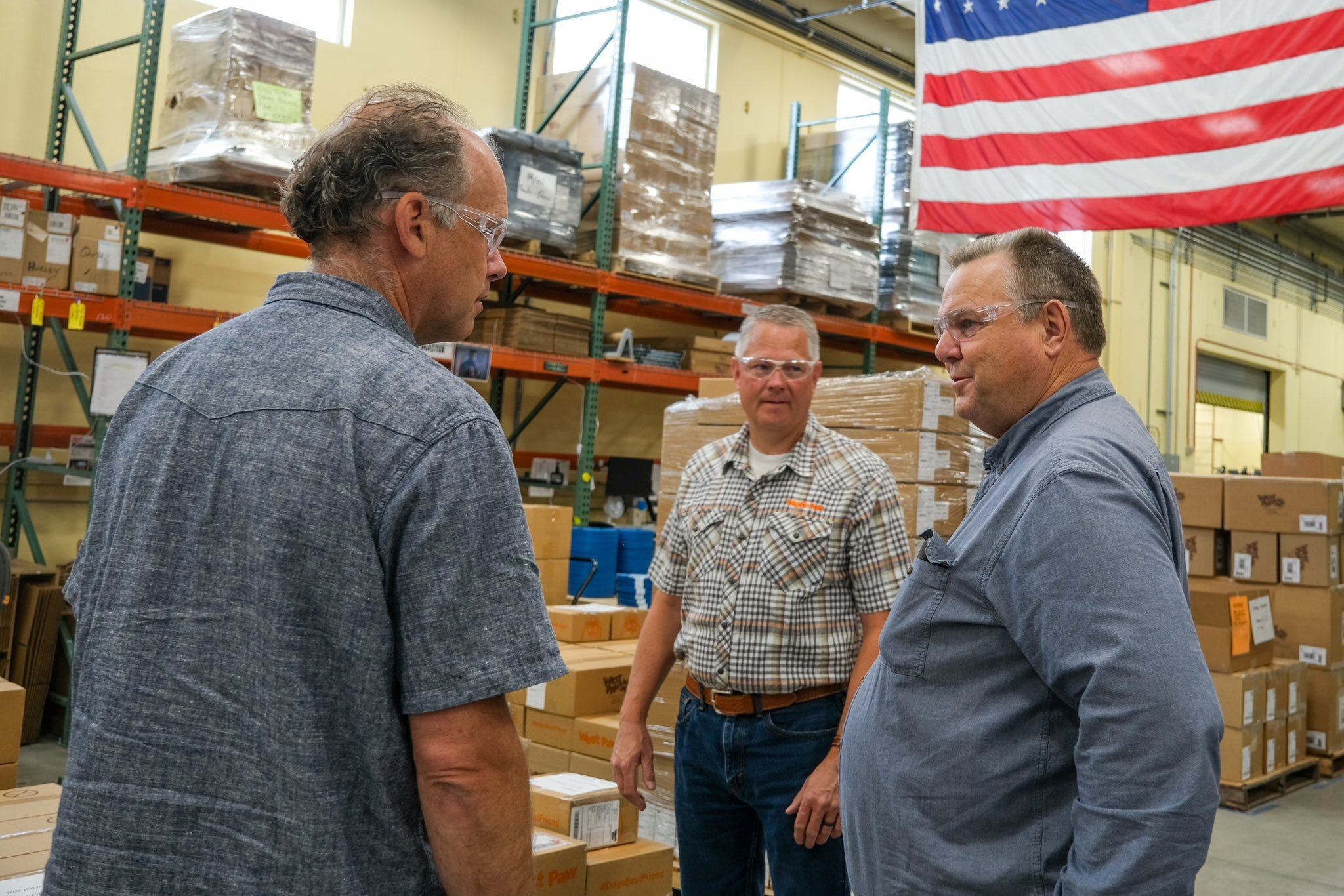
Tester visits manufacturing facility of West Paws in Bozeman, Montana

Tester was one of two Democratic senators to filibuster the American Jobs Act in 2011. It was reported that he was not concerned about the surtax on some families to pay for the plan, but was unsure that the new spending would actually create jobs. "I've got more of a concern about a state aid package ... and how the money is going to be spent and whether it's really going to create jobs," he explained.

Tester was the only Democratic senator from a Republican-leaning state to oppose a stopgap funding measure to end a three-day government shutdown in 2018 and reopen the federal government.

Tester became one of the Democrats in the Senate to support the Economic Growth, Regulatory Relief, and Consumer Protection Act, a bill that partially repealed the Dodd–Frank Wall Street Reform and Consumer Protection Act and relaxed key banking regulations. As one of at least 11 other Democrats, he argued that the bill would "right-size post-crisis rules imposed on small and regional lenders and help make it easier for them to provide credit". Chuck Schumer and Elizabeth Warren vehemently opposed the legislation. Tester became the first Democrat endorsed by Friends of Traditional Banking, a political action committee that had previously endorsed Republicans.

=== Environment ===
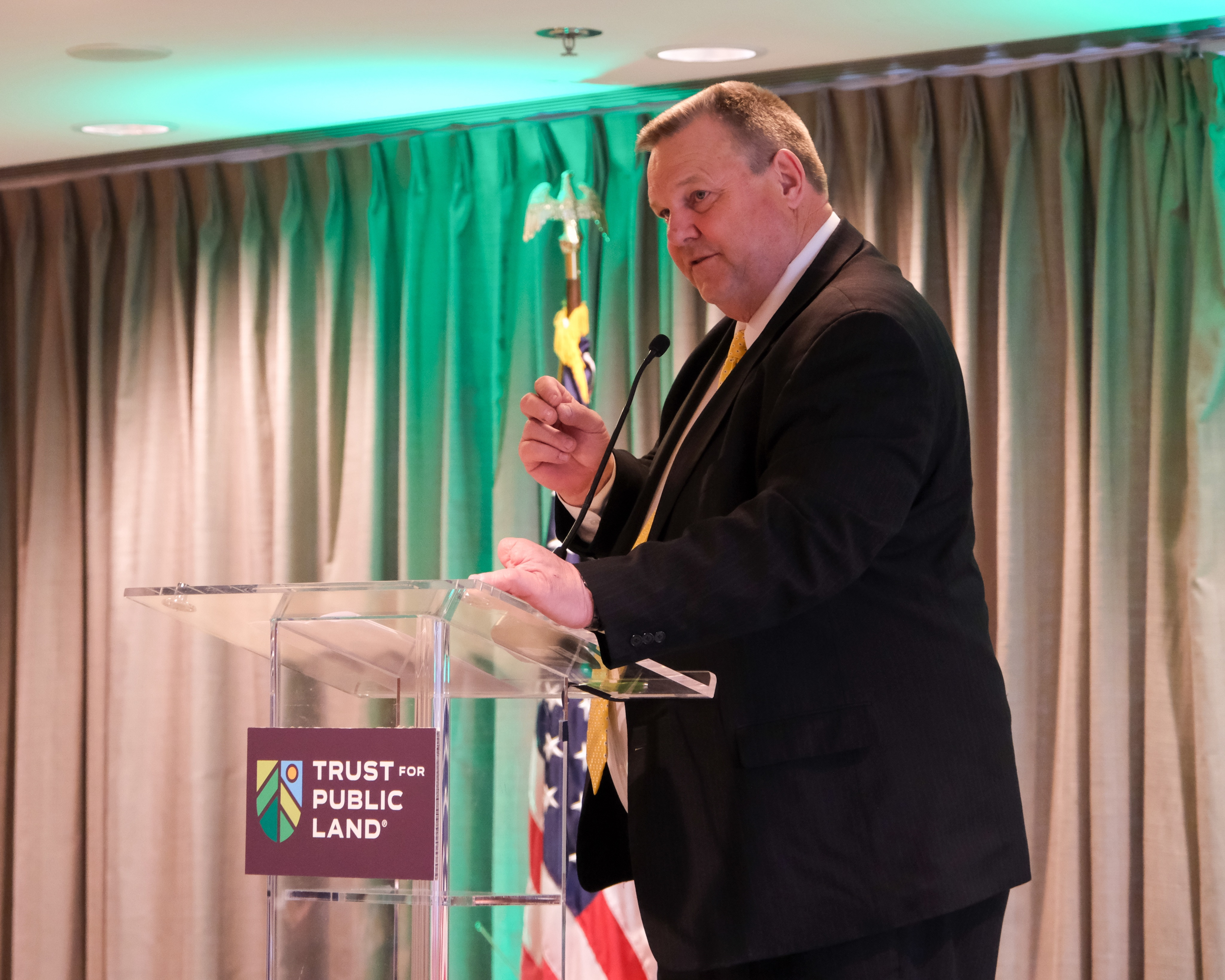
Tester receives the Trust for Public Land's Trailblazer Award

A Newsweek reporter who traveled with Tester in Montana in 2011 said that the "desire to wrest control of wolves from D.C. ... was the only topic that came up everywhere he went: hotels, coffee shops, art auctions. 'What do you think about wolves?' a sixth grader asked during an assembly in Miles City. 'I think we should start hunting them again!' Tester said. The kids let out their loudest cheer of the afternoon." Tester tried to revive a bill that was meant to be a compromise between the conservationists and the timber industry. The bill would put 700,000 acres of wilderness aside for "light-on-the-land logging projects" with the intention of creating jobs in the flagging industry. It was noted that Tester was not "winning admirers on his side", with some liberal environmentalists saying that would give lumber mills control of the national forests.

=== Guns ===
Tester is a gun owner. On gun rights, the National Rifle Association Political Victory Fund gave him an A− grade in 2012. This was downgraded to a D grade in 2018 after he voted against confirming Brett Kavanaugh to the U.S. Supreme Court. Tester supports efforts to loosen restrictions on gun exports, saying it would help U.S. gun manufacturers expand their business and create more jobs.

Tester voted against a Democrat-sponsored proposal in 2016 that would have required background checks for purchases at gun shows and for purchases of guns online nationwide. He argued that the bill would "have blocked family members and neighbors from buying and selling guns to one another without a background check". Tester voted for a second Democrat-sponsored proposal to ban gun sales to people on the terrorist watch list. Both proposals failed.

=== Healthcare ===
Tester supported the Affordable Care Act (also known as Obamacare), having voted for it in December 2009.

Tester said in 2017 that Democrats should consider a single-payer health care system. In the summer of that year, he said that health care needed reform but that the latest GOP attempt at reform was a "train wreck" that would "strip health care away from millions of Americans". He said that Democrats should "work to fix what's wrong with the current healthcare system in a bipartisan way. And that means going through committee process, not doing it in a dark room with a select few, but going through the committee process and getting good ideas from everybody". Reminded that some Democrats "believe that compromise on this issue is not only unprincipled but unnecessary", Tester said the issue was "too important... not to try to help remedy the problems".

=== Immigration ===
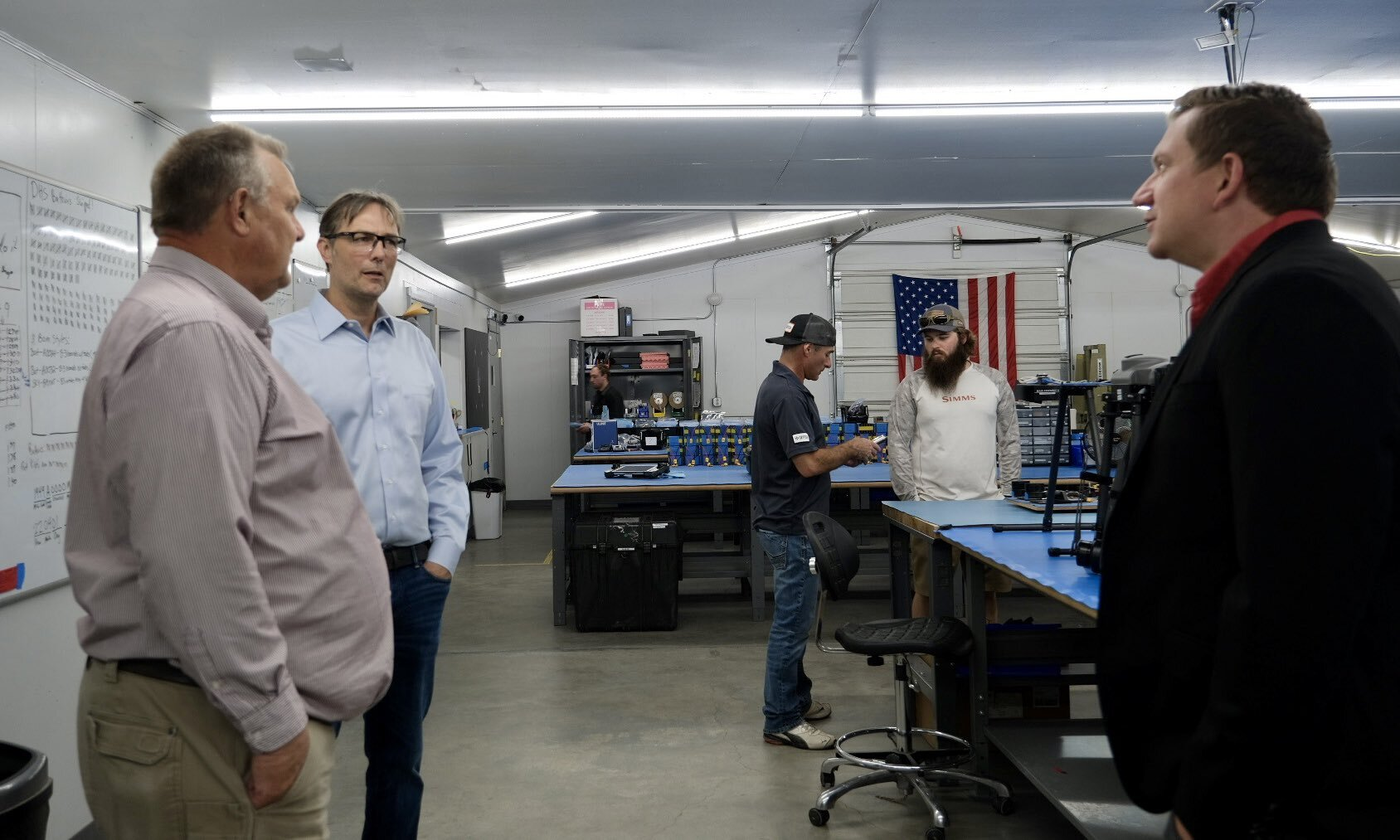
Tester visits Stevensville's Skyfish a producer of drones used for border patrol activity

In 2010, Tester voted against the DREAM Act, legislation that would have created a pathway to citizenship for the foreign-born children of illegal immigrants. He has said, "Illegal immigration is a critical problem facing our country, but amnesty is not the solution. I do not support legislation that provides a path for citizenship for anyone in this country illegally."

In 2017, Tester criticized Trump for saying that he would cancel DACA in six months. "I don't support what the president did", Tester said. "I think it's ill-informed, I think it rips families apart, and it's not what this country stands for." Asked if he would now commit to voting for the DREAM Act, he said, "I support comprehensive immigration reform."

In 2018, Tester and Senators Heidi Heitkamp, Kamala Harris, and Claire McCaskill co-sponsored the Border and Port Security Act, legislation that would mandate the U.S. Customs and Border Protection to "hire, train and assign at least 500 officers per year until the number of needed positions the model identifies is filled" and require the commissioner of Customs and Border Protection to determine potential equipment and infrastructure improvements for ports of entry.

=== Impeachment of Donald Trump ===
Tester voted to convict Trump during both of his impeachment trials.

=== LGBTQ+ rights ===
Tester voted for the Don't Ask, Don't Tell Repeal Act of 2010. While he opposed same-sex marriage during both his 2006 and 2012 campaigns, Tester announced his support for it in 2013, citing concerns about federal government overreach. After the U.S. Supreme Court ruled in Obergefell v. Hodges that all U.S. states must recognize same-sex marriages, Tester praised the ruling as protecting "the rights and freedoms of every married couple". He voted for the Respect for Marriage Act of 2022.

=== Privacy ===
During Tester's 2006 Senate campaign, his opponent, Senator Conrad Burns, criticized him for wanting to weaken the PATRIOT Act. Tester replied: "I don't want to weaken the PATRIOT Act, I want to repeal it!" He opposed the confirmations of Jeff Sessions as Attorney General, Mike Pompeo as Director of the Central Intelligence Agency, and Neil Gorsuch as Associate Justice of the Supreme Court of the United States for supporting the PATRIOT Act's bulk data collection provisions. Tester voted in 2018 against confirming Brett Kavanaugh as an associate justice of the Supreme Court. Among other reasons, he cited "concerns that Judge Kavanaugh defended the PATRIOT Act instead of Montanans' privacy", as Kavanaugh had helped the Bush administration craft a program of mass domestic surveillance and had ruled in favor of increased government surveillance under the PATRIOT Act in Klayman v. Obama. Tester was one of seven Senate Democrats to join Republican Senator Rand Paul in his 10-hour filibuster against reauthorizing the PATRIOT Act in 2015.

=== Supreme Court ===
Tester opposed the Supreme Court decision Citizens United, which allows corporations and unions to donate unlimited amounts of money to third-party political groups. He proposed a constitutional amendment to reverse the decision, arguing that it had a bad impact on American democracy.

Tester voted to confirm Supreme Court nominees Sonia Sotomayor and Elena Kagan. He opposed Trump's nomination of Neil Gorsuch. Tester also voted against Trump's nominees Brett Kavanaugh and Amy Coney Barrett. Tester voted to confirm Joe Biden's nominee, Ketanji Brown Jackson.

=== Torture and interrogation ===
Tester did not support Gina Haspel's nomination in 2018 to become CIA Director. The first Democrat from a red state to express opposition to her, he cited her role in Bush administration interrogation and detention programs, and said he was "not a fan of waterboarding".

=== Veterans affairs ===
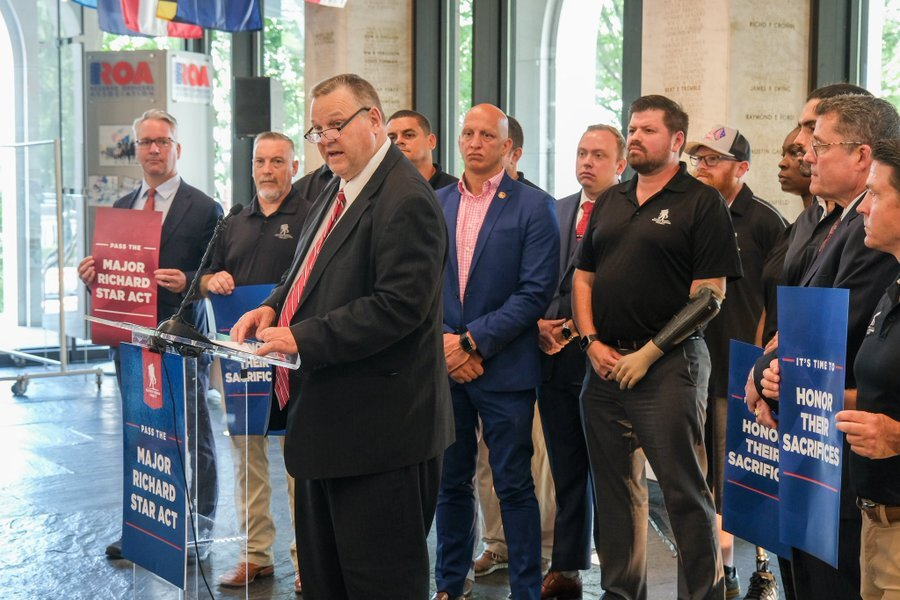
Tester announces that he will attach the Major Richard Star Act, which assists disabled veterans, to the 2025 NDAA bill

In 2018, as ranking member of the Senate Veterans' Affairs Committee, Tester raised concerns about the nomination of Ronny Jackson to head the U.S. Department of Veterans Affairs. There were allegations that Jackson had dispensed medications in a medically unethical fashion, was drunk on an overseas trip, and drunkenly banged on the hotel door of a female colleague. Jackson denied the allegations but withdrew his nomination. In response, Trump called for Tester's resignation and said the allegations against Jackson were false. According to CNN, four sources familiar with the allegation that Jackson drunkenly banged on the door of a female colleague confirmed it. The Secret Service said it could not verify any of the allegations. Johnny Isakson, the Republican chairman of the Senate Veterans Affairs Committee, defended Tester, saying he had no problem with Tester's handling of the nomination.

== Post-Senate career ==
Tester said that following his departure from the Senate, he would continue working on his farm. He co-hosts a podcast with journalist Maritsa Georgiou.

In May 2025, Tester joined MS NOW, known at the time as MSNBC, as a political analyst for the network. He made his first appearance on the network in his new position on Deadline: White House.

In November of 2026, Tester said that he had joined the advisory board of Palantir. Palantir is a data and technology company who has drawn criticism regarding multiple governments' use of its advanced surveillance technology and data-tracking capabilities. Critics of Palantir alleged that the company is helping governments build surveillance states including assisting Israel Defense Forces operations in Gaza and helping President Trump's administration track and deport immigrants. Tester has regularly advocated for limits on government surveillance during his 18 years in the U.S. Senate including opposing extending the USA Patriot Act. Palantir along with other tech giants gave over $10 million for Trump's proposed White House ballroom project. Palantir also won a $30 million contract with ICE to enhance Trump administration deportation efforts.

Tester bucked Democrats in Montana by supporting an independent U.S. Senate candidate, Seth Bodnar, instead of the Democratic nominee Alain Bankhead. Bodnar lost to Republican Kurt Alme on November 3, 2026. However, many other prominent Democrats shared Tester's choice, and Bankhead got less votes than Bodnar although together they overtook the Republican in votes.

== Personal life ==
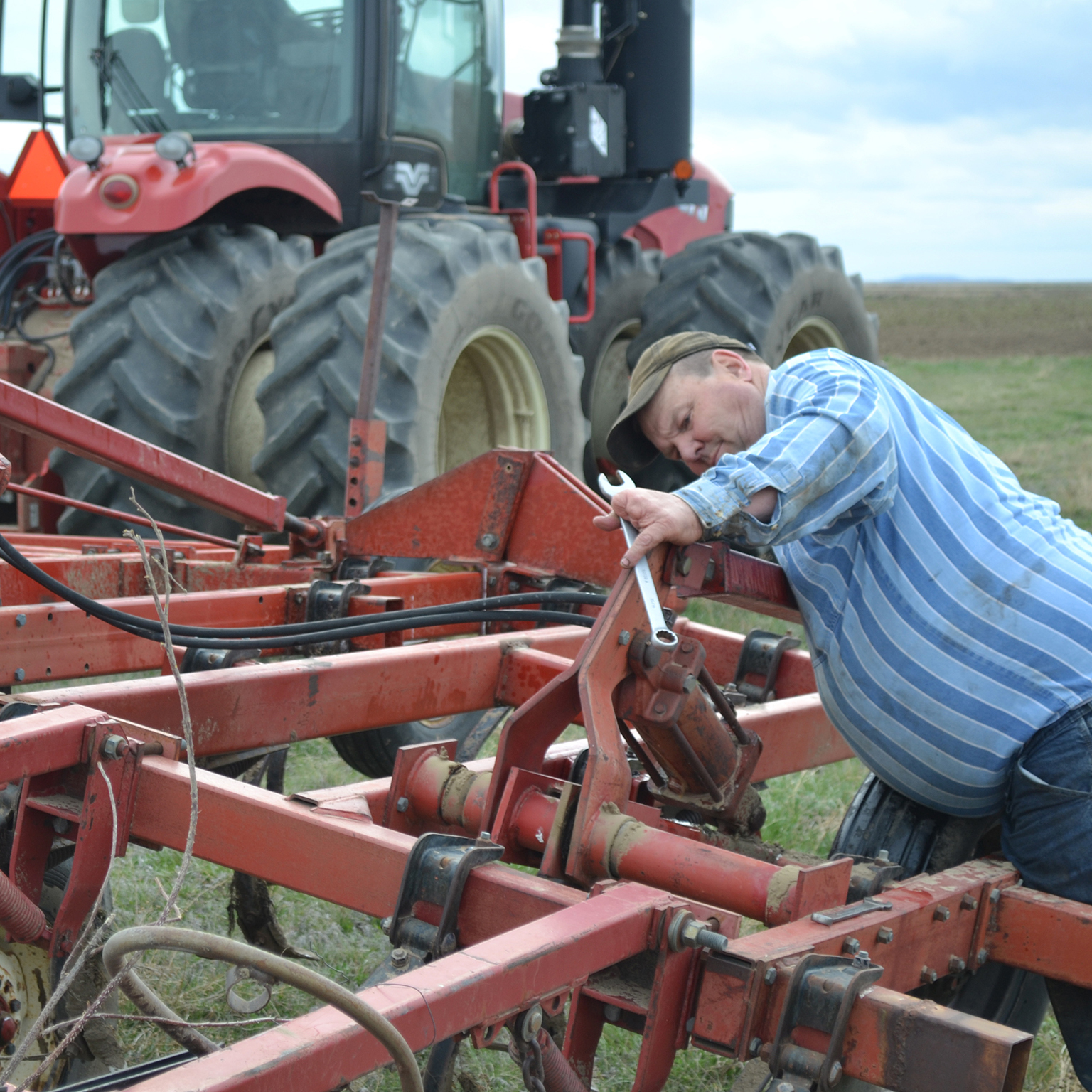
Tester checks the chisel plow's hydraulic cylinder on his north-central Montana farm.

During Tester's senior year in college, he married Sharla Bitz. They have three children. Tester is affiliated with the Church of God (Anderson, Indiana).

Before his election to the Senate, Tester had never lived more than two hours away from his north-central Montana farm. In addition to his Montana farm, Tester owns a home in Washington, D.C.

A profile of Tester noted that he butchers and brings his own meat with him to Washington. He said, "Taking meat with us is just something that we do ... We like our own meat".

== Electoral history ==
2006 U.S. Senate Montana Democratic primary results
Party	Candidate	Votes	%
Democratic	Jon Tester	65,757	60.77
Democratic	John Morrison	38,394	35.48
Democratic	Paul Richards	1,636	1.51
Democratic	Robert Candee	1,471	1.36
Democratic	Kenneth Marcure	940	0.87
Total votes		108,198	100.00

United States Senate election in Montana, 2006
Party	Candidate	Votes	%	±%
Democratic	Jon Tester	199,845	49.16	+1.92
Republican	Conrad Burns (incumbent)	196,283	48.29	−2.27
Libertarian	Stan Jones	10,377	2.55	+2.55
Total votes		406,505	100.00	
Democratic gain from Republican				

2012 U.S. Senate Montana Democratic primary results
Party	Candidate	Votes	%
Democratic	Jon Tester (incumbent)	88,720	100.00
Total votes		88,720	100.00

United States Senate election in Montana, 2012
Party	Candidate	Votes	%	±%
Democratic	Jon Tester (incumbent)	236,123	48.58	−0.58
Republican	Denny Rehberg	218,051	44.86	−3.43
Libertarian	Dan Cox	31,892	6.56	+4.01
Total votes		486,066	100.00	
Democratic hold				

2018 U.S. Senate Montana Democratic primary results
Party	Candidate	Votes	%
Democratic	Jon Tester (incumbent)	114,948	100.00
Total votes		114,948	100.00

United States Senate election in Montana, 2018
Party	Candidate	Votes	%	±%
Democratic	Jon Tester (incumbent)	253,876	50.33	+1.75
Republican	Matt Rosendale	235,963	46.78	+1.92
Libertarian	Rick Breckenridge	14,545	2.88	−3.68
Total votes		504,384	100.00	
Democratic hold				

2024 U.S. Senate Montana Democratic primary results
Party	Candidate	Votes	%
Democratic	Jon Tester (incumbent)	104,279	96.96%
Democratic	Michael Hummert	3,272	3.04%
Total votes		107,551	100.00%

2024 United States Senate election in Montana
Party	Candidate	Votes	%	±%
Republican	Tim Sheehy	319,682	52.64%	+5.86%
Democratic	Jon Tester (incumbent)	276,305	45.50%	−4.83%
Libertarian	Sid Daoud	7,272	1.20%	−1.68%
Green	Robert Barb	4,003	0.66%	N/A
Total votes		607,262	100.00%	N/A
Republican gain from Democratic				

== Books ==
- Tester, Jon (2020). Grounded: A Senator's Lessons on Winning Back Rural America (1st hardcover ed.). New York: Ecco. ISBN 9780062977489. OCLC 1182020521.

Political offices
Preceded by Bob Keenan	President of the Montana Senate; 2005–2007	Succeeded by Mike Cooney
Party political offices
Preceded by Brian Schweitzer	Democratic nominee for U.S. Senator from Montana (Class 1); 2006, 2012, 2018, 2024	Most recent
Preceded by Michael Bennet	Chair of the Democratic Senatorial Campaign Committee; 2015–2017	Succeeded by Chris Van Hollen
U.S. Senate
Preceded by Conrad Burns	U.S. Senator (Class 1) from Montana; 2007–2025; Served alongside: Max Baucus, John Walsh, Steve Daines	Succeeded by Tim Sheehy
Preceded by Maria Cantwell	Chair of the Senate Indian Affairs Committee; 2014–2015	Succeeded by John Barrasso
Preceded by John Barrasso	Ranking Member of the Senate Indian Affairs Committee; 2015–2017	Succeeded by Tom Udall
Preceded by Richard Blumenthal	Ranking Member of the Senate Veterans' Affairs Committee; 2017–2021	Succeeded by Jerry Moran
Preceded by Jerry Moran	Chair of the Senate Veterans' Affairs Committee; 2021-2025	Succeeded by Jerry Moran
U.S. order of precedence (ceremonial)
Preceded by Larry Pressler as Former U.S. Senator	Order of precedence of the United States as Former U.S. Senator	Succeeded by Larry Craig as Former U.S. Senator
