= Paul Karason =

American man with blue skin (1950–2013)

- Karason on The Oprah Winfrey Show in 2008
- Born: November 14, 1950; Alameda County, California, U.S.
- Died: September 23, 2013 (aged 62); Washington, U.S.
- Known for: His blue skin resulting from argyria

Paul Halldor Karason (November 14, 1950 – September 23, 2013) was an American man from Bellingham, Washington, whose skin was a blue color.

Karason had light skin and freckles until the early 1990s. His skin turned blue after he began taking a homemade colloidal silver treatment and rubbing a silver preparation on his skin in an attempt to treat problems with his sinuses, dermatitis, acid reflux, and other issues. This caused him to develop argyria. In 2008, Karason first gained prominence after appearing on Today. He claimed it cured his acid reflux and arthritis but acknowledged it was also the cause of his argyria.

Karason moved from Oregon to the California Central Valley community Madera in the summer of 2007 seeking greater community acceptance. He described himself as somewhat of a recluse. By 2012, Karason lost his home while experiencing a heart condition and prostate cancer. He later moved to a homeless shelter in Bellingham, Washington.

In 2013, Karason died after a heart attack led to pneumonia and a severe stroke. He was a heavy smoker and underwent a triple bypass surgery in 2008. He was estranged from his wife at the time of his death. Karason continued to use colloidal silver until his death.

== See also ==
- Stan Jones, Libertarian politician known for his similarly artificially induced argyria
- Blue Fugates, a family from Kentucky with blue skin caused by a genetic mutation
