= Argyria =

- Other names: Argyrosis
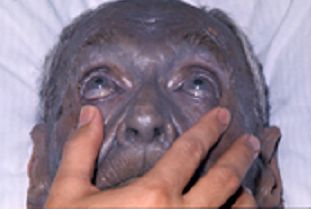
- Generalized argyria in a 92-year-old male.
- Specialty: Dermatology
- Causes: Excessive exposure to silver and/or silver compounds

Argyria or argyrosis is a condition caused by excessive exposure to chemical compounds of the element silver, or silver dust. The most dramatic symptom of argyria is that the skin turns blue or blue-gray, and is usually most prominent in sun-exposed areas of the skin. It may take the form of generalized argyria or local argyria. Generalized argyria affects large areas over much of the visible surface of the body. Local argyria shows in limited regions of the body, such as patches of skin, parts of the mucous membrane, or the conjunctiva.

The terms argyria and argyrosis have long been used interchangeably, with argyria being used more frequently. Argyrosis has been used particularly in referring to argyria of the conjunctiva, but the usage has never been consistent and cannot be relied on except where it has been explicitly specified. The term is from the Ancient Greek: ἄργυρος (argyros, 'silver').

== Pathophysiology ==
In humans and other animals, chronic intake of silver products commonly leads to the gradual accumulation of silver compounds in various parts of the body. As in film photography (where silver is used for its sensitivity to light), exposure of pale or colorless silver compounds to sunlight decomposes them to silver metal or silver sulfides. Commonly these products deposit as microscopic particles in the skin, in effect a dark pigment. This condition is known as argyria or argyrosis.

Chronic intake also may lead to silver pigments depositing in other organs exposed to light, particularly the eyes. In the conjunctiva this is not generally harmful, but it also may affect the lens, leading to serious effects.

Localized argyria often results from topical use of substances containing silver, such as some kinds of eye drops. Generalized argyria results from chronically swallowing or inhaling silver compounds, either for home medicinal purposes or as a result of working with silver or silver compounds.

While silver is potentially toxic to humans at high doses, the risk of serious harm from low doses, given over a short term, is small. Silver is used in some medical appliances because of its anti-microbial nature, which stems from the oligodynamic effect. Chronic ingestion or inhalation of silver preparations (especially colloidal silver) can lead to argyria in the skin and other organs. This is not life-threatening but is considered by most to be cosmetically undesirable.

The reference dose, published by the United States Environmental Protection Agency in 1991, which represents the estimated daily exposure that is unlikely to incur an appreciable risk of deleterious effects during a lifetime, is 5 μg/(kg·d).

Argyria worsens and builds up as exposure to silver continues, and does not resolve once exposure stops because the silver atoms cannot be removed from the skin and other tissues.

== History ==
Since at least the mid-19th century, doctors have known that silver or silver compounds can cause some areas of the skin and other body tissues to turn grey or blue-gray. Argyria occurs in people who ingest or inhale silver in large quantities over a long period (several months to many years). People who work in factories that manufacture silver products can also breathe in silver or its compounds. In the past, some of these workers have become argyric. However, the level of silver in the air and the length of exposure that caused argyria in these workers is not known. Historically, colloidal silver, a liquid suspension of microscopic silver particles, was also used as an internal medication to treat a variety of diseases. In the 1940s, they were overtaken by the use of pharmaceutical antibiotics, such as penicillin.

== Society and culture ==
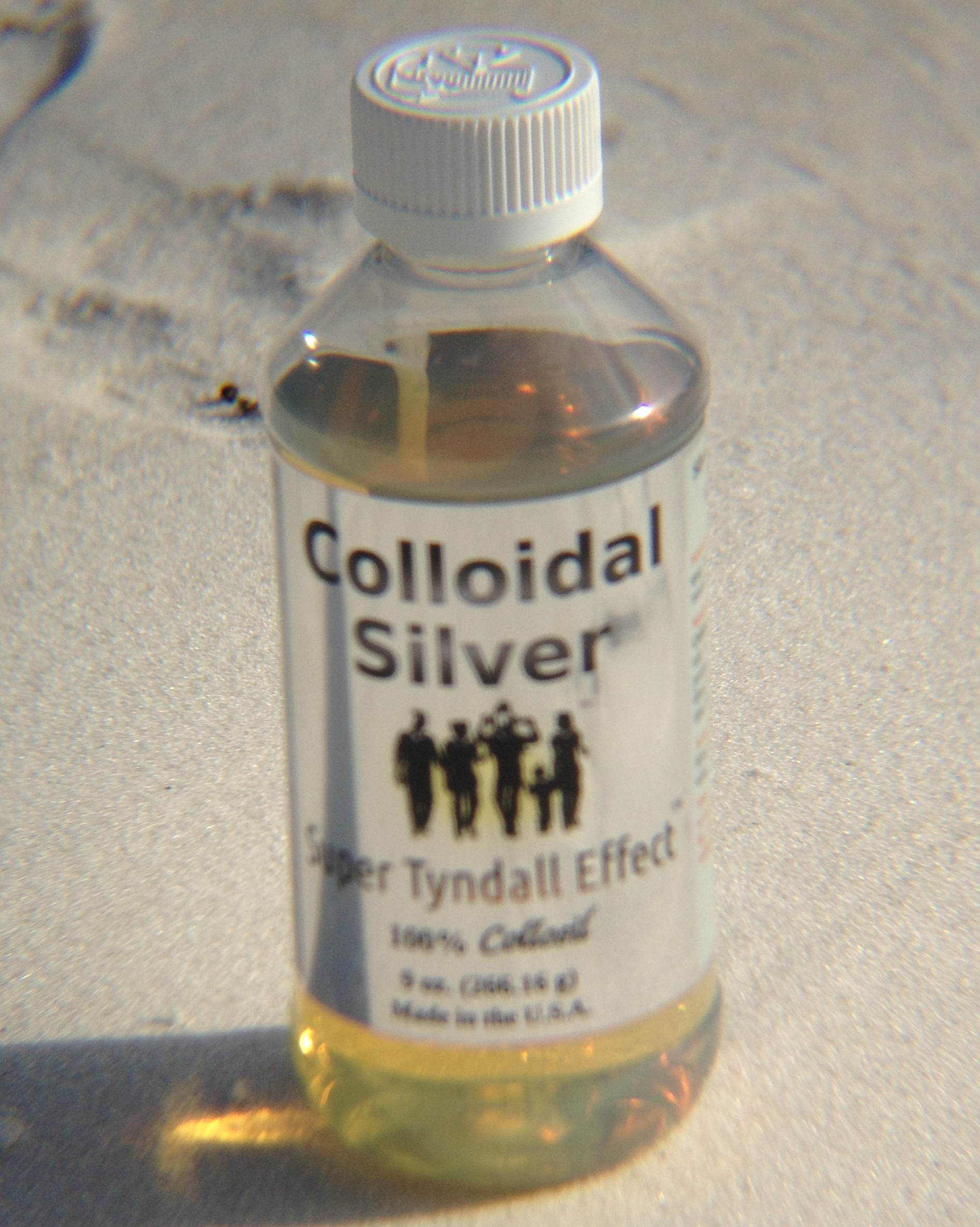
Colloidal silver is illegally marketed as a medicine, but has not proven to treat any condition, and has the potential to pathologically interfere with the functioning of many critical medications, such as antibiotics and thyroxine.

A prominent case involving the ingestion of colloidal silver was that of American Stan Jones, a Libertarian candidate for the United States Senate in 2002 and 2006. The peculiar coloration of his skin was featured prominently in media coverage of his unsuccessful campaign, though his supporters contended that the best-known photo was "doctored". Jones asserted that he was not using his silvery complexion as a gimmick. His purposeful consumption of colloidal silver was a self-prescribed measure undertaken in response to fears that the Y2K problem would make antibiotics unavailable — an event that did not occur. He is nevertheless reported to have said that given the chance to go back, he would do it again. He maintains that his supposed "good health", except for the unusual skin tone, is the result of his use of colloidal silver.

In 2007, press reports described Paul Karason, an American man whose skin gradually turned blue after he took a homemade silver chloride colloid and used a silver salve on his face in an attempt to treat problems with his sinuses, dermatitis, acid reflux and other issues. At the time of the reports, Karason maintained his belief in silver's effectiveness and continued to take it, albeit in smaller doses. He died in 2013 of a heart attack; "a cause of death was not immediately known", but according to Jo Anna Karason, his estranged wife, "Paul Karason had suffered heart problems for years. He was a heavy smoker, despite undergoing triple bypass surgery about five years ago".

Rosemary Jacobs is a prominent activist against alternative medicine. As a child, Jacobs was treated for allergies with nose drops that contained colloidal silver and developed argyria as a result. Jacobs came to international attention after Paul Karason was on The Today Show in 2008. From 2010 to 2013, Jacobs posted about topics in health fraud, pseudoscience, and medical malpractice, particularly concerning naturopathies – such as colloidal silver – on her blog.

== Possible implications ==
Although research is still not definitive, the literature has suggested that argyria can cause a decrement in kidney function. Additionally, a lack of night vision may be present.

== See also ==
- Amalgam tattoo
- Bismuthia – Medical condition
- Carotenodermia – Skin discoloration caused by carotenoids
- Chrysiasis
- Methemoglobinemia – Condition of elevated methemoglobin in the blood, another condition known for causing blue skin coloration
