= 2024 United States Senate election in Montana =

- November 5, 2024
- Turnout: 75.92% (of registered voters) ▲4.39
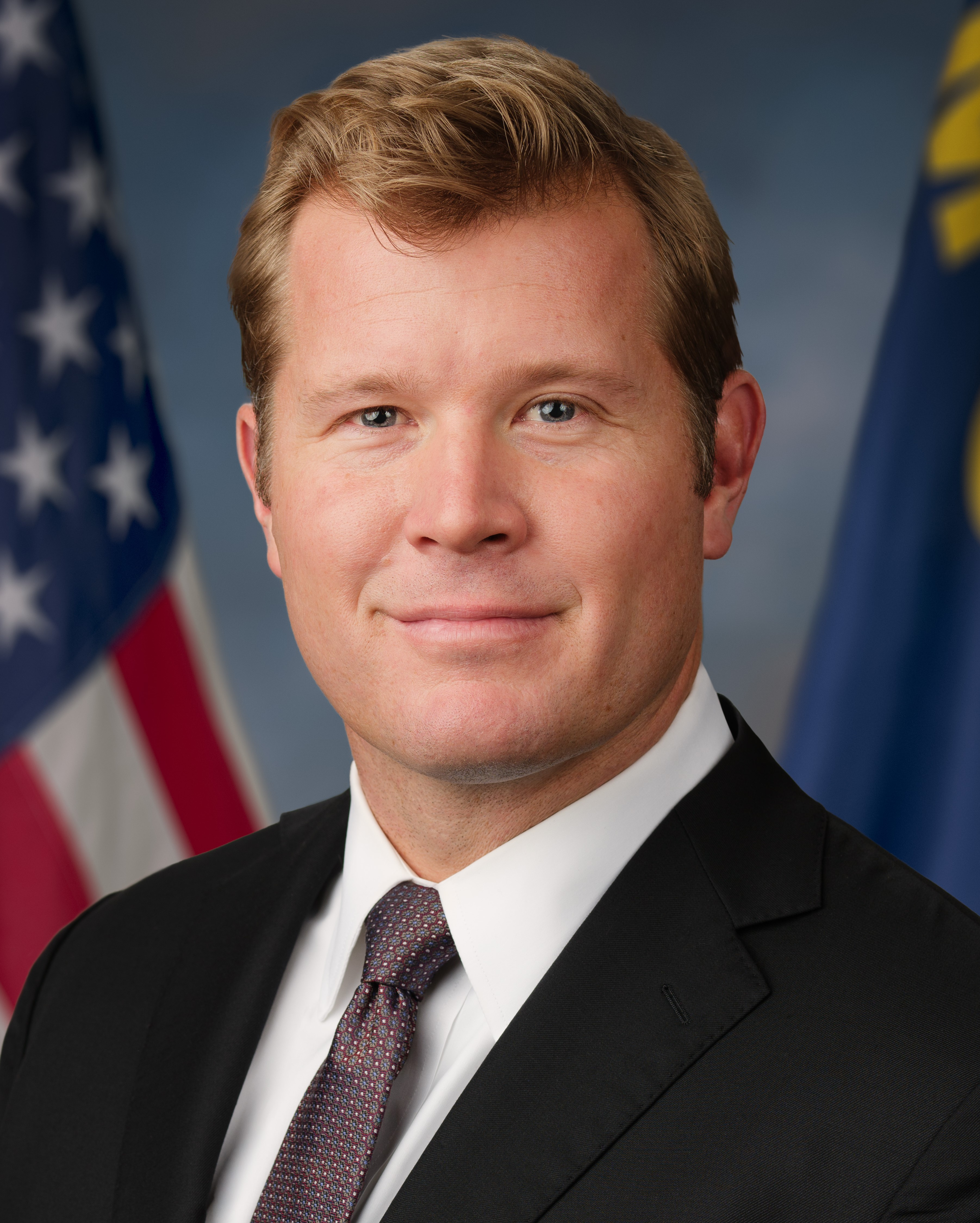

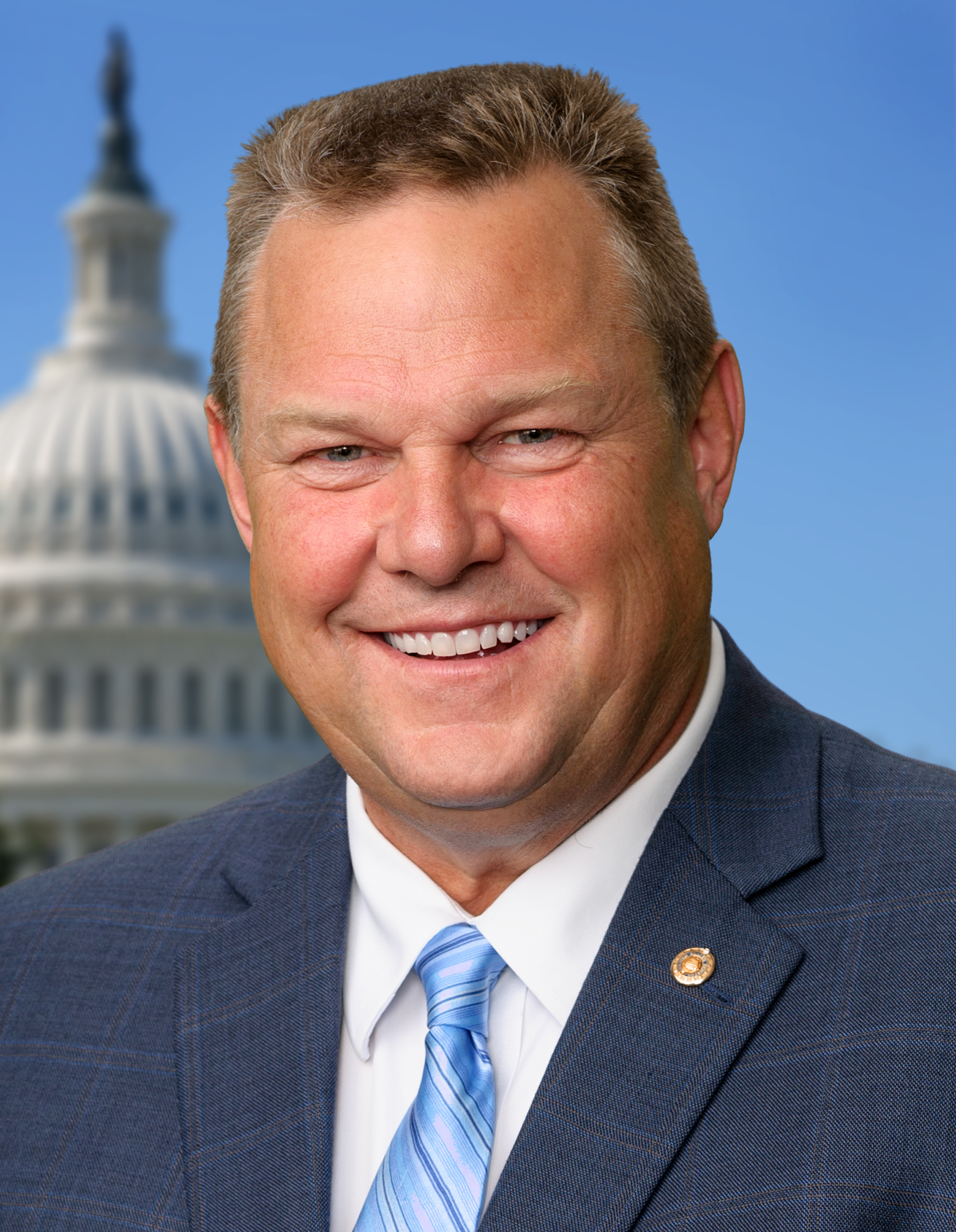
Nominee	Tim Sheehy	Jon Tester
Party	Republican	Democratic
Popular vote	319,682	276,305
Percentage	52.64%	45.50%
- Sheehy: 40–50% 50–60% 60–70% 70–80% 80–90% >90% Tester: 40–50% 50–60% 60–70% 70–80% 80–90% >90% No data
U.S. senator before election
Jon Tester
Democratic
Elected U.S. Senator
Tim Sheehy
Republican

The 2024 United States Senate election in Montana was held on November 5, 2024, to elect a member of the United States Senate to represent the state of Montana. Republican businessman Tim Sheehy won his first term in office, defeating Democratic three-term incumbent Jon Tester.

Despite the state's heavy partisan lean in favor of the Republican Party, Tester remained popular among his constituents. Because of this and Montana's historical inclination to ticket-split, the race was considered to be competitive. Early polling showed Tester to be leading or nearly even, but Sheehy later gained an edge. Tester was widely seen as being the most vulnerable incumbent running for re-election, due to Montana's strong Republican lean and the decline of split-ticket voting.

Tester, a renowned centrist liberal, was first elected in 2006, when he narrowly defeated incumbent Republican senator Conrad Burns, and was reelected in 2012 and 2018. However, come Election Day in 2024, his vulnerability came to fruition as he lost his bid for a fourth term to Tim Sheehy by around 7.1 percentage points. Sheehy received roughly 52.6% of the statewide vote to Tester's 45.5%. Despite his loss, Tester still vastly outperformed Kamala Harris, who lost the state to Donald Trump in the concurrent presidential race by just under 20 percentage points. Tester also carried six counties that Trump concurrently won: Big Horn, Blaine, Hill, Lewis and Clark (Helena), Roosevelt, and Park. Tester received over 44,000 more raw votes than Harris, while Sheehy received over 32,000 fewer raw votes than Trump.

Along with Bob Casey Jr. in Pennsylvania and Sherrod Brown in Ohio, Tester was one of three incumbent senators to lose re-election in 2024. All three were first elected in 2006, defeating Republican incumbents, and won re-election in 2012 and 2018. This race was one of two 2024 U.S. Senate races in which Democratic senators sought re-election in states where Republican Donald Trump won in both the 2016 and 2020 presidential elections, the other being Ohio. With Sheehy's victory, Republicans held both of Montana's Senate seats for the first time since 1911.

== Background ==
Montana has generally been considered a red state at the federal executive level, voting for Republican candidates in each presidential election starting in 1996, when Bob Dole beat Bill Clinton by nearly 3 percentage points in a three-way race with Ross Perot. Since then, GOP candidates have won the White House race in the state by double digits in every race except in 2008. In the most recent presidential election, in 2020, Donald Trump beat Joe Biden in Montana by 56.92% to 40.55%. Republicans have also won all of the state's U.S. House elections since 1996. Within this time frame, Democrats have been more successful in elections for state offices and the U.S. Senate, with its governorship, state legislature, and Senate seats alternating between Democratic and Republican control. Leading up to the 2024 election, Republicans controlled both of Montana's U.S. House seats, the other U.S. Senate seat, the governorship, and had supermajority control of both houses of the state legislature.

Tester refused to endorse fellow Democrat Kamala Harris for president, a contributing factor towards the Senate race having been considered less nationalized. In 2012, the last election that featured Tester on the same ballot as the presidential election, Republican presidential candidate Mitt Romney won by 13.64%, while Tester won by 3.72% without receiving a majority (50%) of the vote.

=== Top-two primary proposal ===
On April 4, 2023, Montana's State Senate passed a bill to institute a top-two primary system, but only for the 2024 U.S. Senate race. The bill's sponsor, Republican Greg Hertz, said it would require the winner of the 2024 Senate race to receive a majority of the vote. Incumbent Democrat Jon Tester won with a plurality of the vote in his 2006 and 2012 Senate campaigns, though he won a majority in 2018. Both Democrats and Libertarians alleged the bill was intended to prevent the Libertarian Party from placing a nominee on the general election ballot in the Senate race who could potentially pull votes away from the Republican nominee, with Democratic state senator Ryan Lynch calling it a "partisan power grab."

After the bill received backlash, Hertz introduced an amendment to make the use of a top-two primary for U.S. Senate elections permanent rather than sunsetting it after the 2024 race. The Montana House of Representatives State Administration Committee tabled the bill on April 19. An attempt to revive the bill failed, and the legislature adjourned without passing it, conclusively ending the push for a top-two primary.

== Democratic primary ==
=== Candidates ===
==== Nominee ====
- Jon Tester, incumbent U.S. senator (2007–2025)

==== Eliminated in primary ====
- Michael Hummert, retired remodeling contractor

=== Endorsements ===
Jon Tester

U.S. senators

- Joe Manchin, U.S. senator from West Virginia (2010–2025) (Independent; Democrat until 2024)

Statewide officials

- Andy Beshear, governor of Kentucky (2019–present)
- Bob Brown, former attorney general of Montana (2001–2005) (Republican)
- Marc Racicot, former governor of Montana (1993–2001) and former chair of the Republican National Committee (2001–2003) (Republican)
- Brian Schweitzer, former governor of Montana (2005–2013)

Organizations

- American Israel Public Affairs Committee (AIPAC)
- Council for a Livable World
- Democratic Majority for Israel
- End Citizens United
- Feminist Majority Foundation PAC
- Jewish Democratic Council of America
- Joint Action Committee for Political Affairs
- League of Conservation Voters
- National Organization for Women PAC
- Natural Resources Defense Council
- Peace Action
- Planned Parenthood Action Fund
- Population Connection Action Fund
- Reproductive Freedom for All
- Swing Left

Labor unions

- Association of Flight Attendants
- Montana AFL-CIO
- Montana Federation of Public Employees
- National Education Association
- National Treasury Employees Union

=== Fundraising ===
Campaign finance reports as of May 15, 2024
Candidate	Raised	Spent	Cash on hand
Jon Tester (D)	$37,330,566	$26,017,759	$11,793,381
Source: Federal Election Commission

=== Results ===
Primary results by county: Tester: 70–80%; >90%

Democratic primary results
Party	Candidate	Votes	%
Democratic	Jon Tester (incumbent)	104,279	96.96%
Democratic	Michael Hummert	3,272	3.04%
Total votes		107,551	100.00%

==== By county ====
County	Jon Tester		Michael Hummert		Margin		Total
County	Votes	%	Votes	%	Votes	%	Votes
Beaverhead	447	96.75%	15	3.25%	432	93.51%	462
Big Horn	600	95.69%	27	4.31%	573	91.39%	627
Blaine	410	96.47%	15	3.53%	395	92.94%	425
Broadwater	405	95.52%	19	4.48%	386	91.04%	424
Carbon	1,088	96.45%	40	3.55%	1,048	92.91%	1,128
Carter	22	73.33%	8	26.67%	14	46.67%	30
Cascade	6,518	96.49%	237	3.51%	6,281	92.98%	6,755
Chouteau	335	99.11%	3	0.89%	332	98.22%	338
Custer	611	94.88%	33	5.12%	578	89.75%	644
Daniels	43	91.49%	4	8.51%	39	82.98%	47
Dawson	302	94.97%	16	5.03%	286	89.94%	318
Deer Lodge	1,783	98.18%	33	1.82%	1,750	96.37%	1,816
Fallon	54	94.74%	3	5.26%	51	89.47%	57
Fergus	751	96.41%	28	3.59%	723	92.81%	779
Flathead	7,821	97.30%	217	2.70%	7,604	94.60%	8,038
Gallatin	13,319	97.45%	348	2.55%	12,971	94.91%	13,667
Garfield	20	100.00%	0	0.00%	20	100.00%	20
Glacier	1,090	97.32%	30	2.68%	1,060	94.64%	1,120
Golden Valley	33	100.00%	0	0.00%	33	100.00%	33
Granite	254	96.58%	9	3.42%	245	93.16%	263
Hill	1,200	96.00%	50	4.00%	1,150	92.00%	1,250
Jefferson	1,330	97.15%	39	2.85%	1,291	94.30%	1,369
Judith Basin	157	97.52%	4	2.48%	153	95.03%	161
Lake	2,771	97.47%	72	2.53%	2,699	94.93%	2,843
Lewis and Clark	10,325	97.30%	286	2.70%	10,039	94.61%	10,611
Liberty	84	91.30%	8	8.70%	76	82.61%	92
Lincoln	1,235	94.27%	75	5.73%	1,160	88.55%	1,310
Madison	658	96.91%	21	3.09%	637	93.81%	679
McCone	68	94.44%	4	5.56%	64	88.89%	72
Meagher	117	92.86%	9	7.14%	108	85.71%	126
Mineral	240	96.77%	8	3.23%	232	93.55%	248
Missoula	19,858	97.48%	514	2.52%	19,344	94.95%	20,372
Musselshell	168	96.00%	7	4.00%	161	92.00%	175
Park	2,433	97.48%	63	2.52%	2,370	94.95%	2,496
Petroleum	15	93.75%	1	6.25%	14	87.50%	16
Phillips	138	94.52%	8	5.48%	130	89.04%	146
Pondera	369	95.84%	16	4.16%	353	91.69%	385
Powder River	64	95.52%	3	4.48%	61	91.04%	67
Powell	355	96.99%	11	3.01%	344	93.99%	366
Prairie	60	98.36%	1	1.64%	59	96.72%	61
Ravalli	3,531	97.46%	92	2.54%	3,439	94.92%	3,623
Richland	270	95.41%	13	4.59%	257	90.81%	283
Roosevelt	459	93.67%	31	6.33%	428	87.35%	490
Rosebud	427	97.94%	9	2.06%	418	95.87%	436
Sanders	913	95.90%	39	4.10%	874	91.81%	952
Sheridan	168	96.00%	7	4.00%	161	92.00%	175
Silver Bow	6,447	96.63%	225	3.37%	6,222	93.26%	6,672
Stillwater	524	96.32%	20	3.68%	504	92.65%	544
Sweet Grass	217	96.02%	9	3.98%	208	92.04%	226
Teton	578	97.14%	17	2.86%	561	94.29%	595
Toole	188	94.47%	11	5.53%	177	88.94%	199
Treasure	35	94.59%	2	5.41%	33	89.19%	37
Valley	448	96.55%	16	3.45%	432	93.10%	464
Wheatland	86	96.63%	3	3.37%	83	93.26%	89
Wibaux	36	94.74%	2	5.26%	34	89.47%	38
Yellowstone	12,401	96.19%	491	3.81%	11,910	92.38%	12,892

== Republican primary ==
=== Candidates ===
==== Nominee ====
- Tim Sheehy, founder and former CEO of Bridger Aerospace

==== Eliminated in primary ====
- Brad Johnson, former chair of the Montana Public Service Commission (2015–2023) and former Montana Secretary of State (2005–2009)
- Charles Walkingchild Sr., environmental contractor and candidate for Montana's 2nd congressional district in 2022

==== Withdrew ====
- Jeremy Mygland, construction company owner (endorsed Rosendale, ran for state senate)
- Matt Rosendale, U.S. representative from Montana's 2nd congressional district (2023–2025) and at-large district (2021–2023); nominee for U.S. Senate in 2018 (endorsed Sheehy)

==== Declined ====
- Greg Gianforte, governor of Montana (2021–present) (endorsed Sheehy, ran for re-election)
- Ryan Zinke, U.S. representative from Montana's 1st congressional district (2023–present) and at-large district (2015–2017); former U.S. secretary of the interior (2017–2019) (endorsed Sheehy, ran for re-election)

=== Endorsements ===
Tim Sheehy

Executive branch officials

- Donald Trump, 45th president of the United States (2017–2021)

U.S. senators

- John Barrasso, U.S. senator from Wyoming (2007–present)
- Marsha Blackburn, U.S. senator from Tennessee (2019–present)
- Ted Budd, U.S. senator from North Carolina (2023–present)
- Tom Cotton, U.S. senator from Arkansas (2015–present)
- Steve Daines, U.S. senator from Montana (2015–present)
- Bill Hagerty, U.S. senator from Tennessee (2021–present)
- Cindy Hyde-Smith, U.S. senator from Mississippi (2018–present)
- Markwayne Mullin, U.S. senator from Oklahoma (2023–2026)
- Marco Rubio, U.S. senator from Florida (2011–2025)
- John Thune, U.S. senator from South Dakota (2005–present)
- Tommy Tuberville, U.S. senator from Alabama (2021–present)

Governors

- Doug Burgum, governor of North Dakota (2016–2024)
- Greg Gianforte, governor of Montana (2021–present)
- Kristi Noem, governor of South Dakota (2019–2025)

U.S. representatives

- Newt Gingrich, former speaker of the United States House of Representatives (1995–1999) from Georgia's 6th congressional district (1979–1999)
- Marjorie Taylor Greene, U.S. representative from Georgia's 14th congressional district (2021–2026)
- Matt Rosendale, U.S. representative from Montana's 2nd congressional district (2021–2025)
- Ryan Zinke, U.S. representative from Montana's 1st congressional district (2023–present) and at-large district (2015–2017); former U.S. secretary of the interior (2017–2019)

Organizations

- Americans for Prosperity
- Gun Owners of America
- National Republican Senatorial Committee
- National Rifle Association Political Victory Fund
- Senate Conservatives Fund
- Susan B. Anthony Pro-Life America
Matt Rosendale (withdrawn)

U.S. senators

- Mike Lee, U.S. senator from Utah (2011–present)

U.S. representatives

- Matt Gaetz, U.S. representative from Florida's 1st congressional district (2017–2024)

State legislators

- Jason Ellsworth, president of the Montana Senate (2023–2025) from the 43rd district (2019–present)
- Matt Regier, speaker of the Montana House of Representatives (2023–2025) from the 4th district (2017–2025)

Individuals

- Steve Bannon, former White House chief strategist (2017) and former executive chair of Breitbart News

Organizations

- Gun Owners of America

=== Fundraising ===
Campaign finance reports as of May 15, 2024
Candidate	Raised	Spent	Cash on hand
Brad Johnson (R)	$42,967 (Note: $30,000 of this total was self-funded by Johnson)	$39,697	$3,270
Tim Sheehy (R)	$10,547,437 (Note: $2,050,000 of this total was self-funded by Sheehy)	$8,324,164	$2,223,272
Source: Federal Election Commission

=== Polling ===
Poll source	Date(s) administered	Sample size (Note: Key: A – all adults RV – registered voters LV – likely voters V – unclear)	Margin of error	Brad Johnson	Matt Rosendale	Tim Sheehy	Other / Undecided
co/efficient (R)	November 12–14, 2023	888 (LV)	± 3.3%	–	24%	40%	36%
Fabrizio, Lee & Associates (R)	October 23–25, 2023	600 (LV)	± 4.0%	6%	35%	38%	21% (Note: Jeremy Mygland with 1%)
Fabrizio, Lee & Associates (R)	October 23–25, 2023	600 (LV)	± 4.0%	0%	41%	44%	15%
J.L. Partners	August 12–17, 2023	418 (LV)	–	–	52%	21%	28%
Public Policy Polling (D)	June 19–20, 2023	510 (LV)	± 4.3%	–	64%	10%	26%

Hypothetical polling

Poll source	Date(s) administered	Sample size	Margin of error	Russell Fagg	Brad Johnson	Matt Rosendale	Tim Sheehy	Corey Stapleton	Ryan Zinke	Other / Undecided
OnMessage Inc. (R)	February 18–21, 2023	600 (LV) (Note: Oversample of 100 likely Republican primary voters)	± 4.0%	2%	–	36%	2%	6%	26%	28%

=== Results ===
Primary results by county: Sheehy: 50–60%; 60–70%; 70–80%; 80–90%

Republican primary results
Party	Candidate	Votes	%
Republican	Tim Sheehy	139,857	73.60%
Republican	Brad Johnson	36,926	19.43%
Republican	Charles Walkingchild Sr.	13,229	6.96%
Total votes		190,012	100.00%

==== By county ====
County	Tim Sheehy		Brad Johnson		Charles Walkingchild Sr.		Margin		Total
County	Votes	%	Votes	%	Votes	%	Votes	%	Votes
Beaverhead	1,814	71.50%	458	18.05%	265	10.45%	1,356	53.45%	2,537
Big Horn	714	72.12%	194	19.60%	82	8.28%	520	52.53%	990
Blaine	594	75.67%	154	19.62%	37	4.71%	440	56.05%	785
Broadwater	1,564	75.30%	360	17.33%	153	7.37%	1,204	57.97%	2,077
Carbon	2,076	70.56%	650	22.09%	216	7.34%	1,426	48.47%	2,942
Carter	294	61.89%	164	34.53%	17	3.58%	130	27.37%	475
Cascade	8,957	71.36%	2,549	20.31%	1,046	8.33%	6,408	51.05%	12,552
Chouteau	1,012	72.34%	278	19.87%	109	7.79%	734	52.47%	1,399
Custer	1,409	68.50%	531	25.81%	117	5.69%	878	42.68%	2,057
Daniels	363	65.05%	161	28.85%	34	6.09%	202	36.20%	558
Dawson	1,296	60.85%	674	31.64%	160	7.51%	622	29.20%	2,130
Deer Lodge	864	72.00%	255	21.25%	81	6.75%	609	50.75%	1,200
Fallon	607	62.13%	323	33.06%	47	4.81%	284	29.07%	977
Fergus	2,300	77.18%	547	18.36%	133	4.46%	1,753	58.83%	2,980
Flathead	15,618	75.69%	3,716	18.01%	1,300	6.30%	11,902	57.68%	20,634
Gallatin	11,201	78.07%	2,141	14.92%	1,006	7.01%	9,060	63.14%	14,348
Garfield	398	75.67%	116	22.05%	12	2.28%	282	53.61%	526
Glacier	638	72.25%	168	19.03%	77	8.72%	470	53.23%	883
Golden Valley	213	81.30%	38	14.50%	11	4.20%	175	66.79%	262
Granite	696	70.59%	209	21.20%	81	8.22%	687	69.68%	986
Hill	1,428	72.34%	426	21.58%	120	6.08%	1,002	50.76%	1,974
Jefferson	2,147	72.58%	605	20.45%	206	6.96%	1,542	52.13%	2,958
Judith	525	75.21%	132	18.91%	41	5.87%	393	56.30%	698
Lake	4,360	75.19%	1,052	18.14%	387	6.67%	3,308	57.04%	5,799
Lewis and Clark	8,427	70.65%	2,421	20.30%	1,079	9.05%	6,006	50.36%	11,927
Liberty	448	74.42%	123	20.43%	31	5.15%	325	53.99%	602
Lincoln	3,507	72.65%	932	19.31%	388	8.04%	2,575	53.35%	4,827
Madison	1,908	77.97%	391	15.98%	148	6.05%	1,517	61.99%	2,447
McCone	419	71.26%	154	26.19%	15	2.55%	265	45.07%	588
Meagher	454	78.14%	107	18.42%	20	3.44%	347	59.72%	581
Mineral	929	68.97%	265	19.67%	153	11.36%	664	49.29%	1,347
Missoula	9,790	73.34%	2,455	18.39%	1,104	8.27%	7,335	54.95%	13,349
Musselshell	1,052	79.28%	207	15.60%	68	5.12%	845	63.68%	1,327
Park	2,600	74.80%	579	16.66%	297	8.54%	2,021	58.14%	3,476
Petroleum	152	79.17%	33	17.19%	7	3.65%	119	61.98%	192
Phillips	996	82.31%	168	13.88%	46	3.80%	828	68.43%	1,210
Pondera	962	69.01%	333	23.89%	99	7.10%	629	45.12%	1,394
Powder River	366	62.35%	200	34.07%	21	3.58%	166	28.28%	587
Powell	1,046	74.82%	254	18.17%	98	7.01%	792	56.65%	1,398
Prairie	217	57.11%	140	36.84%	23	6.05%	77	20.26%	380
Ravalli	8,563	72.29%	2,234	18.86%	1,049	8.86%	6,329	53.43%	11,846
Richland	1,139	62.55%	560	30.75%	122	6.70%	579	31.80%	1,821
Roosevelt	669	68.47%	225	23.03%	83	8.50%	444	45.45%	977
Rosebud	1,025	76.26%	250	18.60%	69	5.13%	775	57.66%	1,344
Sanders	2,542	76.18%	622	18.64%	173	5.18%	1,920	57.54%	3,337
Sheridan	529	59.04%	269	30.02%	98	10.94%	260	29.02%	896
Silver Bow	2,850	69.60%	909	22.20%	336	8.21%	1,941	47.40%	4,095
Stillwater	1,937	78.20%	444	17.92%	96	3.88%	1,493	60.27%	2,477
Sweet Grass	783	73.25%	216	20.21%	70	6.55%	567	53.04%	1,069
Teton	1,063	72.31%	287	19.52%	120	8.16%	776	52.79%	1,470
Toole	719	75.37%	182	19.08%	53	5.56%	537	56.29%	954
Treasure	206	77.74%	49	18.49%	10	3.77%	157	59.25%	265
Valley	1,460	76.20%	349	18.22%	107	5.58%	1,111	57.99%	1,916
Wheatland	404	75.23%	95	17.69%	38	7.08%	309	57.54%	537
Wibaux	163	61.98%	84	31.94%	16	6.08%	79	30.04%	263
Yellowstone	21,444	75.54%	5,488	19.33%	1,454	5.12%	15,956	56.21%	28,386

== Libertarian primary ==
=== Candidates ===
==== Nominee ====
- Sid Daoud, Kalispell city councilor and chair of the Montana Libertarian Party

== Green primary ==
=== Candidates ===
==== Withdrew after nomination ====
- Michael Downey, drought program coordinator

==== Replacement nominee ====
- Robert Barb, nominee for governor in 2020

=== Results ===
Green primary results
Party	Candidate	Votes	%
Green	Michael Downey	679	62.4%
Green	Robert Barb	410	37.6%
Total votes		1,089	100.0%

==== By county ====
County	Michael Downey		Robert Barb		Margin		Total
County	Votes	%	Votes	%	Votes	%	Votes
Beaverhead	0	0.00%	3	100.00%	−3	−100.00%	3
Big Horn	8	88.89%	1	11.11%	7	77.78%	9
Blaine	4	80.00%	1	20.00%	3	60.00%	5
Broadwater	6	85.71%	1	14.29%	5	71.43%	7
Carbon	13	81.25%	3	18.75%	10	62.50%	16
Carter	0	n/a	0	n/a	0	n/a	0
Cascade	42	61.76%	26	38.24%	16	23.53%	68
Chouteau	2	50.00%	2	50.00%	0	0.00%	4
Custer	3	60.00%	2	40.00%	1	20.00%	5
Daniels	1	100.00%	0	0.00%	1	100.00%	1
Dawson	4	80.00%	1	20.00%	3	60.00%	5
Deer Lodge	6	100.00%	0	0.00%	6	100.00%	6
Fallon	1	100.00%	0	0.00%	1	100.00%	1
Fergus	7	58.33%	5	41.67%	2	16.67%	12
Flathead	21	51.22%	20	48.78%	1	2.44%	41
Gallatin	56	59.57%	38	40.43%	18	19.15%	94
Garfield	1	50.00%	1	50.00%	0	0.00%	2
Glacier	5	62.50%	3	37.50%	2	25.00%	8
Golden Valley	0	n/a	0	n/a	0	n/a	0
Granite	1	100.00%	0	0.00%	1	100.00%	1
Hill	4	57.14%	3	42.86%	1	14.29%	7
Jefferson	8	57.14%	6	42.86%	2	14.29%	14
Judith	0	n/a	0	n/a	0	n/a	0
Lake	5	50.00%	5	50.00%	0	0.00%	10
Lewis and Clark	78	77.23%	23	22.77%	55	54.46%	101
Liberty	0	n/a	0	n/a	0	n/a	0
Lincoln	2	40.00%	3	60.00%	−1	−20.00%	5
Madison	3	75.00%	1	25.00%	2	50.00%	2
McCone	1	100.00%	0	0.00%	1	100.00%	1
Meagher	0	n/a	0	n/a	0	n/a	0
Mineral	0	0.00%	3	100.00%	−3	−100.00%	3
Missoula	62	50.82%	60	49.18%	2	1.64%	122
Musselshell	4	66.67%	2	33.33%	2	33.33%	6
Park	15	68.18%	7	31.82%	8	36.34%	22
Petroleum	0	n/a	0	n/a	0	n/a	0
Phillips	0	n/a	0	n/a	0	n/a	0
Pondera	6	85.71%	1	14.29%	5	71.43%	7
Powder River	0	n/a	0	n/a	0	n/a	0
Powell	0	n/a	0	n/a	0	n/a	0
Prairie	1	100.00%	0	0.00%	1	100.00%	1
Ravalli	16	80.00%	4	20.00%	12	60.00%	20
Richland	3	50.00%	3	50.00%	0	0.00%	6
Roosevelt	6	75.00%	2	25.00%	4	50.00%	8
Rosebud	0	0.00%	2	100.00%	−2	−100.00%	2
Sanders	4	57.14%	3	42.86%	1	14.29%	7
Sheridan	0	n/a	0	n/a	0	n/a	0
Silver Bow	120	53.10%	106	46.90%	14	6.19%	226
Stillwater	5	41.67%	7	58.33%	−2	−16.67%	12
Sweet Grass	2	66.67%	1	33.33%	1	33.33%	3
Teton	2	50.00%	2	50.00%	0	0.00%	4
Toole	3	100.00%	0	0.00%	3	100.00%	3
Treasure	0	0.00%	1	100.00%	−1	−100.00%	1
Valley	5	71.43%	2	28.57%	3	42.86%	7
Wheatland	1	100.00%	0	0.00%	1	100.00%	1
Wibaux	1	100.00%	0	0.00%	1	100.00%	1
Yellowstone	141	71.57%	56	28.43%	85	43.15%	197

=== Aftermath ===
Michael Downey, the winner of the Green Party primary election, dropped out of the race on August 12, citing the possibility that he might be a spoiler candidate in a close race. The Green Party of Montana selected the runner-up, Robert Barb, to replace Downey. The Montana Democratic Party filed a lawsuit asking for Barb to be removed from the ballot because of allegations that the Montana Green Party did not follow its procedure for designating a replacement candidate. Kathy Seeley, the district court judge hearing the case, denied the request. The Montana Democratic Party appealed to the Montana Supreme Court, but the justices refused to hear the case, leaving Barb on the ballot.

== General election ==
=== Campaign ===
Senator Jon Tester made some moves to distance himself from the Joe Biden administration, but his voting record remained in line with the Democratic Party. In July 2024, he called for Biden to withdraw from the 2024 United States presidential election. In August, he announced that he would not endorse Kamala Harris for president.

Hank Green, an American YouTuber, author, and educator known for his work on the educational series Crash Course, served as a moderator at an event for Tester in Missoula, Montana, in August 2024. He led a Q&A session alongside musician Jeff Ament, discussing local issues and encouraging voters to participate in the November election.

Sheehy received $8 million from billionaire Stephen Schwarzman and at least 63 other billionaires and 37 of their immediate family members, who donated about $47 million to Sheehy's Senate race.

Recordings first reported by The Char-Koosta News in August 2024 of Tim Sheehy at a 2023 closed-door fundraiser led to accusations that he had racially stereotyped Montana's Crow people. In one statement about how he ropes and brands cattle with Crow tribe members, he said it is "a great way to bond with all the Indians while they're drunk at 8 a.m." Sheehy said the tapes had been "chopped up". Tribal leaders requested an apology, but Sheehy declined.

=== Predictions ===
Source	Ranking	As of
The Cook Political Report	Lean R (flip)	September 12, 2024
Inside Elections	Tilt R (flip)	September 12, 2024
Sabato's Crystal Ball	Lean R (flip)	September 6, 2024
Decision Desk HQ/The Hill	Likely R (flip)	October 20, 2024
Elections Daily	Lean R (flip)	August 9, 2024
CNalysis	Tilt R (flip)	November 4, 2024
RealClearPolitics	Lean R (flip)	September 12, 2024
Split Ticket	Lean R (flip)	October 23, 2024

=== Post-primary endorsements ===
Jon Tester (D)

Statewide officials

- Bob Brown, former secretary of state of Montana (2001–2005) (Republican)
- Marc Racicot, former governor of Montana (1993–2001) (Republican)
- Gretchen Whitmer, governor of Michigan (2019–present)

State senators

- Terry Vermeire, state senator from the 39th district (2023–present) (Republican)

State representatives

- Mallerie Stromswold, former state representative from the 50th district (2021–2023) (Republican)
- Dan Hurwitz, former state representative from the 83rd district (2003–2005) (Republican)

Individuals

- Harry Dunn, former U.S. Capitol Police officer

Organizations

- National Committee to Preserve Social Security and Medicare
Tim Sheehy (R)

U.S. representatives

- Tulsi Gabbard, U.S. representative from Hawaii's 2nd congressional district (2013–2021)

U.S. senators

- John Thune, Senate minority whip (2021–2025) from South Dakota (2005–present)

Statewide officials

- Ron DeSantis, governor of Florida

Individuals

- Charlie Kirk, founder of Turning Point USA
- Ben Shapiro, editor emeritus of The Daily Wire

Organizations

- National Rifle Association Political Victory Fund

=== Fundraising ===
In October 2024, total spending for both sides (including both campaign spending and Independent expenditures), was on track to exceed $315 million. With Montana having only 648,000 active registered voters, the amount spent averaged $487 per voter, making the race the most expensive congressional campaign in U.S. history on a per voter basis. Democrats outspent Republicans by $50 million. Most of the money came from out-of-state dark money groups.

Campaign finance reports as of October 16, 2024
Candidate	Raised	Spent	Cash on hand
Jon Tester (D)	$88,163,151	$84,499,372	$4,144,352
Tim Sheehy (R)	$26,161,679 (Note: $2,450,000 of this total was self-funded by Sheehy)	$22,284,629	$3,877,050
Source: Federal Election Commission

=== Debates ===
Dates	Host	Tester	Sheehy	Link
June 10, 2024	Montana Broadcasters Association	Participant	Participant	YouTube
September 30, 2024	Montana PBS	Participant	Participant	YouTube

=== Polling ===
Aggregate polls

Source of poll aggregation	Dates administered	Dates updated	Tim Sheehy (R)	Jon Tester (D)	Undecided (Note: Calculated by taking the difference of 100% and all other candidates combined.)	Margin
RealClearPolitics	October 5 – November 4, 2024	November 4, 2024	50.7%	43.0%	6.3%	Sheehy +7.7%
538	through November 4, 2024	November 4, 2024	49.7%	42.7%	7.6%	Sheehy +7.0%
270toWin	October 10–27, 2024	November 4, 2024	51.0%	45.0%	4.0%	Sheehy +6.0%
TheHill/DDHQ	through November 4, 2024	November 4, 2024	50.0%	43.1%	6.9%	Sheehy +6.9%
Average			50.4%	43.5%	6.1%	Sheehy +6.9%

Poll source	Date(s) administered	Sample size	Margin of error	Jon Tester (D)	Tim Sheehy (R)	Other	Undecided
AtlasIntel	November 3–4, 2024	752 (LV)	± 4.0%	39%	50%	5% (Note: "Blank/Null/Won't vote" with 4%; "Other" with 1%)	6%
Emerson College (Note: Poll sponsored by The Hill.)	October 23–25, 2024	1,000 (LV)	± 3.0%	48%	51%	2% (Note: Daoud (L) with 1%; Barb (G) with 1%)	–
Emerson College	October 23–25, 2024	1,000 (LV)	± 3.0%	46%	50%	2%	3%
MSU Billings	September 30 – October 16, 2024	760 (LV)	± 3.6%	43%	43%	6% (Note: Daoud (L) with 4%; Barb (G) with 2%)	8%
New York Times/Siena College	October 5–8, 2024	656 (LV)	± 4.3%	44%	52%	–	4%
New York Times/Siena College	October 5–8, 2024	656 (RV)	± 4.3%	44%	51%	–	4%
Public Opinion Strategies (R) (Note: Poll sponsored by the Montana Republican Party)	September 29 – October 1, 2024	500 (LV)	± 4.3%	45%	51%	2% (Note: Sid Daoud (L) with 1%)	2%
Remington Research Group (R) (Note: Poll sponsored by American Fuel & Petrochemical Manufacturers, a group that supports Republicans.)	September 16–20, 2024	800 (LV)	± 3.5%	44%	52%	–	4%
RMG Research (Note: Poll commissioned by the Napolitan Institute)	September 12–19, 2024	491 (LV)	± 4.4%	43%	50%	2%	4%
Fabrizio Ward (R)/ David Binder Research (D) (Note: Poll sponsored by AARP.)	August 25–29, 2024	600 (LV)	± 4.0%	45%	51%	–	4%
Fabrizio Ward (R)/ David Binder Research (D)	August 25–29, 2024	600 (LV)	± 4.0%	41%	49%	5% (Note: Sid Daoud (L) with 4%; Michael Downey with 1%)	5%
Public Opinion Strategies (R)	August 18–20, 2024	500 (LV)	± 4.4%	44%	51%	3% (Note: Sid Daoud (L) with 2%; Michael Downey (G) with 1%)	2%
Rasmussen Reports (R) (Note: Poll sponsored by NumbersUSA, a conservative group)	August 13–20, 2024	835 (LV)	± 3.0%	43%	50%	–	7%
RMG Research	August 6–14, 2024	540 (RV)	± 4.2%	49%	44%	2%	4%
American Pulse Research & Polling (Note: Poll commissioned by KULR-TV)	August 10–12, 2024	538 (RV)	± 4.2%	45%	51%	–	4%
Emerson College	August 5–6, 2024	1,000 (LV)	± 3.0%	46%	48%	–	5%
Expedition Strategies (Note: Poll Sponsored by Progressive Policy Institute)	June 24 – July 8, 2024	251 (LV)	–	47%	48%	–	4%
Remington Research Group (R)	June 29 – July 1, 2024	570 (LV)	± 4.0%	45%	50%	–	5%
Torchlight Strategies (R) (Note: Poll commissioned by Common Sense for America PAC, which supports Republican candidates)	June 22–26, 2024	649 (RV)	± 3.9%	41%	47%	5%	7%
Public Opinion Strategies (R)	June 11–13, 2024	500 (LV)	± 4.4%	46%	46%	4% (Note: Sid Daoud (L) with 2%; Michael Downey (G) with 2%)	4%
Fabrizio, Lee & Associates (R) (Note: Poll sponsored by More Jobs, Less Government, a super PAC "with ties to" U.S. Senator Steve Daines, who is supporting Sheehy.)	June 3–5, 2024	500 (LV)	± 4.4%	48%	48%	–	4%
Fabrizio, Lee & Associates (R)	June 3–5, 2024	500 (LV)	± 4.4%	43%	46%	4% (Note: Sid Daoud (L) with 4%)	7%
J.L. Partners	March 26–29, 2024	503 (LV)	± 4.3%	45%	48%	–	7%
Emerson College	February 26 – March 2, 2024	1,000 (RV)	± 3.0%	44%	42%	–	14%
SurveyUSA (Note: Poll sponsored by KULR-TV)	February 12–15, 2024	549 (LV)	± 4.5%	49%	40%	3%	7%
Emerson College	October 1–4, 2023	447 (RV)	± 4.6%	39%	35%	6%	21%
J.L. Partners	August 12–17, 2023	741 (LV)	–	42%	46%	–	12%

Hypothetical polling

Jon Tester vs. Greg Gianforte

Poll source	Date(s) administered	Sample size	Margin of error	Jon Tester (D)	Greg Gianforte (R)	Undecided
Political Company (R)	January 30 – February 1, 2023	534 (LV)	± 4.0%	45%	45%	10%

Jon Tester vs. Brad Johnson

Poll source	Date(s) administered	Sample size	Margin of error	Jon Tester (D)	Brad Johnson (R)	Other	Undecided
SurveyUSA	February 12–15, 2024	549 (LV)	± 4.5%	50%	35%	4%	11%

Jon Tester vs. Matt Rosendale

Poll source	Date(s) administered	Sample size	Margin of error	Jon Tester (D)	Matt Rosendale (R)	Other	Undecided
SurveyUSA	February 12–15, 2024	549 (LV)	± 4.5%	49%	40%	4%	7%
J.L. Partners	August 12–17, 2023	741 (LV)	–	43%	46%	–	11%
OnMessage Inc. (R)	February 18–21, 2023	600 (LV)	± 4.0%	41%	46%	5%	7%
Political Company (R)	January 30 – February 1, 2023	534 (LV)	± 4.0%	45%	40%	–	15%

Jon Tester vs. Ryan Zinke

Poll source	Date(s) administered	Sample size	Margin of error	Jon Tester (D)	Ryan Zinke (R)	Undecided
Political Company (R)	January 30 – February 1, 2023	534 (LV)	± 4.0%	46%	40%	14%

=== Results ===
2024 United States Senate election in Montana
Party	Candidate	Votes	%	±%
Republican	Tim Sheehy	319,682	52.64%	+5.86%
Democratic	Jon Tester (incumbent)	276,305	45.50%	−4.83%
Libertarian	Sid Daoud	7,272	1.20%	−1.68%
Green	Robert Barb	4,003	0.66%	N/A
Total votes		607,262	100.00%	N/A
Republican gain from Democratic				

==== By county ====
County	Jon Tester Democratic		Tim Sheehy Republican		Various candidates Other parties		Margin		Total votes
County	#	%	#	%	#	%	#	%	Total votes
Beaverhead	2,024	34.65%	3,707	63.47%	110	1.88%	1,683	28.81%	5,841
Big Horn	2,805	62.99%	1,580	35.48%	68	1.53%	−1,225	−27.51%	4,453
Blaine	1,814	59.34%	1,192	38.99%	51	1.67%	−622	−20.35%	3,057
Broadwater	1,219	25.18%	3,503	72.35%	120	2.48%	2,284	47.17%	4,842
Carbon	2,794	37.82%	4,459	60.35%	135	1.83%	1,665	22.54%	7,388
Carter	109	12.76%	732	85.71%	13	1.52%	623	72.95%	854
Cascade	17,323	45.73%	19,808	52.30%	746	1.97%	2,485	6.56%	37,877
Chouteau	1,274	43.03%	1,643	55.49%	44	1.49%	369	12.46%	2,961
Custer	1,855	31.87%	3,818	65.60%	147	2.53%	1,963	33.73%	5,820
Daniels	220	23.06%	719	75.37%	15	1.57%	499	52.31%	954
Dawson	1,259	27.06%	3,269	70.26%	125	2.69%	2,010	43.20%	4,653
Deer Lodge	2,991	60.92%	1,820	37.07%	99	2.02%	−1,171	−23.85%	4,910
Fallon	256	17.12%	1,200	80.27%	39	2.61%	944	63.14%	1,495
Fergus	1,910	28.24%	4,749	70.22%	104	1.54%	2,839	41.98%	6,763
Flathead	23,647	37.21%	38,582	60.72%	1,313	2.07%	14,936	23.51%	63,542
Gallatin	39,094	55.41%	30,537	43.28%	924	1.31%	−8,557	−12.13%	70,555
Garfield	68	8.54%	720	90.45%	8	1.01%	652	81.91%	796
Glacier	3,638	70.86%	1,426	27.78%	70	1.36%	−2,212	−43.09%	5,134
Golden Valley	91	17.50%	422	81.15%	7	1.35%	331	63.65%	520
Granite	778	35.61%	1,377	63.02%	30	1.37%	599	27.41%	2,185
Hill	3,438	50.32%	3,217	47.09%	177	2.59%	−221	−3.23%	6,832
Jefferson	3,099	37.10%	5,108	61.15%	146	1.75%	2,009	24.05%	8,353
Judith Basin	352	25.88%	991	72.87%	17	1.25%	639	46.99%	1,360
Lake	7,798	45.89%	8,881	52.26%	314	1.85%	1,083	6.37%	16,993
Lewis and Clark	22,175	52.31%	19,367	45.69%	847	2.00%	−2,808	−6.62%	42,389
Liberty	307	30.64%	683	68.16%	12	1.20%	376	37.52%	1,002
Lincoln	3,287	27.81%	8,291	70.15%	241	2.04%	5,004	42.34%	11,819
Madison	2,025	31.09%	4,388	67.36%	101	1.55%	2,363	36.28%	6,514
McCone	173	15.94%	890	82.03%	22	2.03%	717	66.08%	1,085
Meagher	309	26.19%	845	71.61%	26	2.20%	536	45.42%	1,180
Mineral	950	33.35%	1,831	64.27%	68	2.39%	881	30.92%	2,849
Missoula	48,429	66.00%	23,743	32.36%	1,200	1.64%	−24,686	−33.64%	73,372
Musselshell	536	17.84%	2,408	80.13%	61	2.03%	1,872	62.30%	3,005
Park	6,009	50.85%	5,614	47.51%	193	1.63%	−395	−3.34%	11,816
Petroleum	50	15.24%	274	83.54%	4	1.22%	224	68.29%	328
Phillips	490	22.27%	1,678	76.27%	32	1.45%	1,188	54.00%	2,200
Pondera	1,017	35.48%	1,804	62.94%	45	1.57%	787	27.46%	2,866
Powder River	205	18.47%	886	79.82%	19	1.71%	681	61.35%	1,110
Powell	1,065	32.26%	2,160	65.43%	76	2.30%	1,095	33.17%	3,301
Prairie	180	25.97%	489	70.56%	24	3.46%	309	44.59%	693
Ravalli	10,449	34.78%	19,116	63.62%	482	1.60%	8,667	28.84%	30,047
Richland	1,238	23.36%	3,914	73.85%	148	2.79%	2,676	50.49%	5,300
Roosevelt	2,249	56.82%	1,636	41.33%	73	1.84%	−613	−15.49%	3,958
Rosebud	1,435	38.53%	2,208	59.29%	81	2.18%	773	20.76%	3,724
Sanders	2,241	27.65%	5,663	69.86%	202	2.49%	3,422	42.22%	8,106
Sheridan	685	36.11%	1,159	61.10%	53	2.79%	474	24.99%	1,897
Silver Bow	11,854	64.36%	6,232	33.84%	332	1.80%	−5,622	−30.52%	18,418
Stillwater	1,352	22.79%	4,473	75.40%	107	1.80%	3,121	52.61%	5,932
Sweet Grass	665	27.69%	1,685	70.15%	52	2.16%	1,020	42.46%	2,402
Teton	1,216	33.72%	2,323	64.42%	67	1.86%	1,107	30.70%	3,606
Toole	558	27.30%	1,436	70.25%	50	2.45%	878	42.95%	2,044
Treasure	101	22.60%	336	75.17%	10	2.24%	235	52.57%	447
Valley	1,307	31.93%	2,672	65.28%	114	2.79%	1,365	33.35%	4,093
Wheatland	278	25.60%	792	72.93%	16	1.47%	514	47.33%	1,086
Wibaux	121	22.00%	414	75.27%	15	2.73%	293	53.27%	550
Yellowstone	33,493	40.85%	46,812	57.10%	1,680	2.05%	13,319	16.25%	81,985
Totals	276,305	45.50%	319,682	52.64%	11,275	1.86%	43,377	7.14%	607,262

Counties that flipped from Democratic to Republican

- Cascade (largest city: Great Falls)
- Lake (largest city: Polson)

==== By congressional district ====
Sheehy and Tester each won one of two congressional districts, with Tester narrowly winning the 1st district, which elected a Republican representative.

District	Tester	Sheehy	Representative
1st	49.51%	48.77%	Ryan Zinke
2nd	40.90%	57.08%	Matt Rosendale (118th Congress)
2nd	40.90%	57.08%	Troy Downing (119th Congress)

== See also ==
- 2024 Montana elections

== Notes ==
Partisan clients
