= 2006 United States Senate election in Montana =

- November 7, 2006
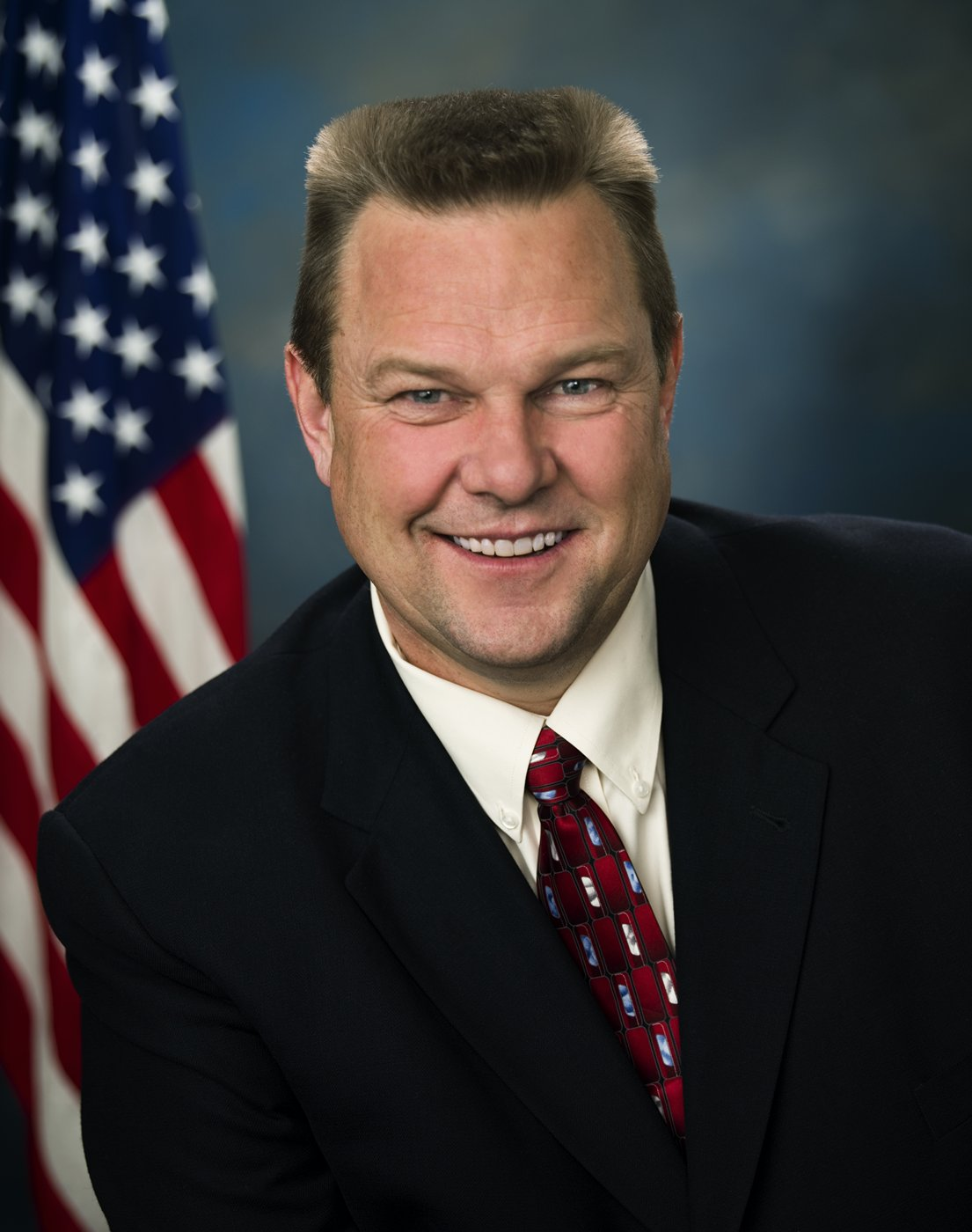

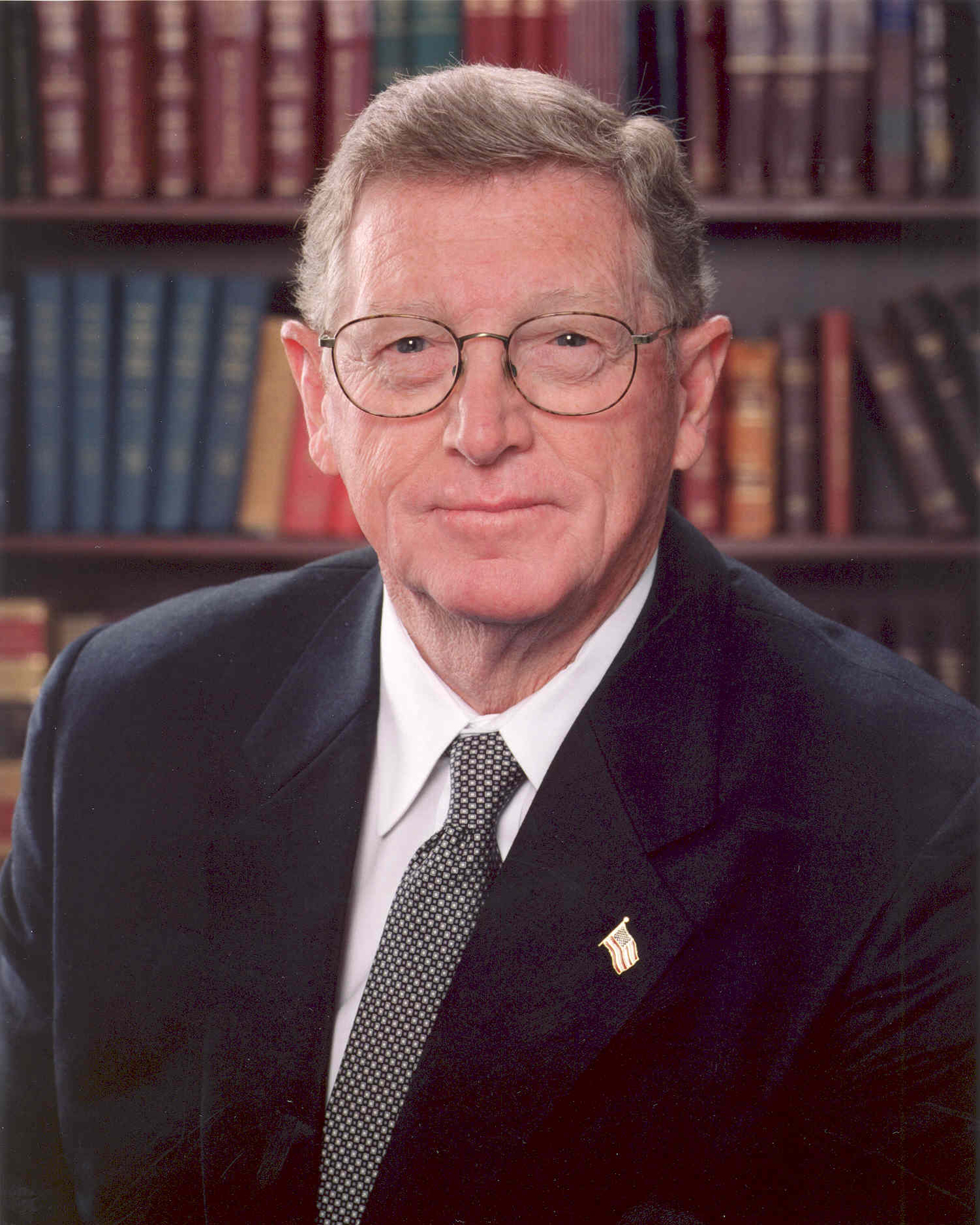
| Nominee | Jon Tester | Conrad Burns |
| Party | Democratic | Republican |
| Popular vote | 199,845 | 196,283 |
| Percentage | 49.16% | 48.29% |
- County results Tester: 40–50% 50–60% 60–70% 70–80% Burns: 40–50% 50–60% 60–70% 70–80% 80–90%
U.S. senator before election
Conrad Burns
Republican
Elected U.S. Senator
Jon Tester
Democratic

The 2006 United States Senate election in Montana was held on November 7, 2006. The filing deadline was March 23; the primary was held on June 6. Incumbent Republican Senator Conrad Burns ran for re-election to a fourth term, but lost to Democrat Jon Tester by a margin of 0.87%, or 3,562 votes out of 406,505 cast. This made the election the second-closest race of the 2006 Senate election cycle, behind only the election in Virginia. This was the last time an incumbent Senator lost reelection in Montana until 2024, when Tester lost to Tim Sheehy.

== Background ==
Burns was first elected as a United States senator from Montana in 1988, when he defeated Democratic incumbent John Melcher in a close race, 52% to 48%. Burns was re-elected 62.4% to 37.6%, over Jack Mudd in the Republican Revolution year of 1994. In 2000, Burns faced the well-financed Brian Schweitzer, whom he beat 50.6% to 47.2%.

In 2000, George W. Bush carried Montana 58% to 33% in the race for president, but Burns won by 3.4%. Since the direct election of senators began in 1913, Burns is only the second Republican that Montana has elected to the U.S. Senate. Also, for thirty-two straight years, 1952 to 1984, Montana elected only Democratic senators.

Burns' involvement in the Jack Abramoff scandal made him vulnerable. A SurveyUSA poll released in March 2006 found that 38% of Montanans approved of him, while 52% disapproved of him. Polls against leading Democratic candidates had him below his challengers.

== Democratic primary ==
=== Candidates ===
- Robert Candee, farmer
- Ken Marcure, activist
- John Morrison, Montana state auditor
- Jon Tester, president of the Montana State Senate

==== Withdrew ====
- Paul Richards, Montana state representative (endorsed Tester)

=== Campaign ===
On May 31, 2006, Richards, citing the closeness of the race, and his own position (third) in the polls, withdrew from the race, and threw his support to Tester. Morrison started off strong in the race for the Democratic nomination for senator, collecting $1.05 million as of the start of 2006, including $409,241 in the last three months of 2005. However, Morrison's advantages in fundraising and name identification did not translate into a lead in the polls. Later, the race was called a "deadlock," but Tester continued to gather momentum.

=== Results ===
Democratic primary results
| Party | Candidate | Votes | % |
|---|---|---|---|
| Democratic | Jon Tester | 65,757 | 60.77 |
| Democratic | John Morrison | 38,394 | 35.48 |
| Democratic | Paul Richards (withdrawn) | 1,636 | 1.51 |
| Democratic | Robert Candee | 1,471 | 1.36 |
| Democratic | Kenneth Marcure | 940 | 0.87 |
| Total votes | | 108,198 | 100.00 |

== Republican primary ==
=== Candidates ===
- Conrad Burns, incumbent U.S. senator
- Daniel Lloyd Neste Huffman, businessman
- Bob Keenan, minority leader of the Montana Senate
- Bob Kelleher, perennial candidate

=== Results ===
Republican primary results
| Party | Candidate | Votes | % |
|---|---|---|---|
| Republican | Conrad Burns (incumbent) | 70,434 | 72.26 |
| Republican | Bob Keenan | 21,754 | 22.32 |
| Republican | Bob Kelleher | 4,082 | 4.19 |
| Republican | Daniel Loyd Neste Huffman | 1,203 | 1.23 |
| Total votes | | 97,473 | 100.00 |

== General election ==
=== Candidates ===
- Conrad Burns (R), incumbent U.S. senator
- Stan Jones (L), activist
- Jon Tester (D), state senator

=== Campaign ===
The race was expected to be close, due to Burns' narrow margin of victory in 2000, when he significantly underperformed Republican presidential nominee George W. Bush, and a political scandal that he had been involved in. Republican incumbents everywhere were facing more challenging races in 2006 due to the waning popularity of the Republican-controlled Congress and the administration of President George W. Bush. In July 2006, the Rasmussen report viewed Burns as the "second most vulnerable Senator seeking re-election this year", after Pennsylvania's Rick Santorum.

Senator Conrad Burns of Montana faced a strong challenge from Brian Schweitzer in 2000, being re-elected by 3.4% in a state that went for Bush twice by margins of over 20%. This, combined with the increasing strength of the state Democratic party and accusations of ethical issues related to the Jack Abramoff scandal, made this a highly competitive race.

On July 27, Burns was forced to apologize after he confronted out of state firefighters who were preparing to leave Montana after helping contain a summer forest fire and directly questioned their competence and skill, remarks for which he was strongly criticized.

On August 31, in a letter faxed to the office of Montana governor Brian Schweitzer, Burns urged the governor, a Democrat, to declare a fire state of emergency and activate the Montana Army National Guard for firefighting. Schweitzer had already declared such a state of emergency on July 11 — thus, activating the Montana Army National Guard. He issued a second declaration on August 11. A Burns spokesman said the senator was "pretty sure" Schweitzer had already issued such a disaster declaration, but just wanted to make sure. "The genesis of the letter was just to make sure that all the bases were covered," Pendleton said. "This is not a political football. It’s just a cover-the-bases letter and certainly casts no aspersions on the governor."

=== Debates ===
- Complete video of debate, June 25, 2006 - C-SPAN
- Complete video of debate, September 10, 2006 - C-SPAN
- Complete video of debate, September 23, 2006 - C-SPAN
- Complete video of debate, October 9, 2006 - C-SPAN
- Complete video of debate, October 12, 2006 - C-SPAN
- Complete video of debate, October 20, 2006 - C-SPAN

=== Endorsements ===
Jon Tester (D)

Individuals

- Wesley Clark, general, 2004 democratic presidential candidate

=== Predictions ===
| Source | Ranking | As of |
|---|---|---|
| The Cook Political Report | Tossup | November 6, 2006 |
| Sabato's Crystal Ball | Lean D (flip) | November 6, 2006 |
| Rothenberg Political Report | Lean D (flip) | November 6, 2006 |
| Real Clear Politics | Tossup | November 6, 2006 |

=== Polling ===
| Source | Date | Jon Tester (D) | Conrad Burns (R) | Stan Jones (L) |
|---|---|---|---|---|
| Mason Dixon | May 2005 | 26% | 50% | |
| Rasmussen | September 8, 2005 | 38% | 51% | |
| Mason Dixon | December 24, 2005 | 35% | 49% | |
| Rasmussen | January 11, 2006 | 45% | 45% | |
| Rasmussen | February 13, 2006 | 46% | 46% | |
| Rasmussen | March 20, 2006 | 46% | 43% | |
| Rasmussen | April 15, 2006 | 44% | 47% | |
| Ayres McHenry & Associates (R) | May 2, 2006 | 48% | 42% | |
| Rasmussen | May 16, 2006 | 48% | 44% | |
| Mason Dixon | May 28, 2006 | 45% | 42% | |
| Lake Research (D) | June 20–26, 2006 | 43% | 42% | |
| Rasmussen | July 11, 2006 | 50% | 43% | |
| Rasmussen | August 10, 2006 | 47% | 47% | |
| Lake Research (D) | August 10, 2006 | 44% | 37% | |
| Gallup | September 5, 2006 | 48% | 45% | |
| Rasmussen | September 13, 2006 | 52% | 43% | |
| Rasmussen | September 20, 2006 | 50% | 43% | |
| Mason-Dixon | October 1, 2006 | 47% | 40% | 3% |
| Reuters/Zogby | October 5, 2006 | 46% | 42% | |
| Rasmussen | October 11, 2006 | 49% | 42% | |
| Rasmussen | October 18, 2006 | 48% | 46% | |
| Montana State University-Billings | October 19, 2006 | 46% | 35% | |
| Mason-Dixon/McClatchy-MSNBC | October 24, 2006 | 46% | 43% | |
| Harstad Strategic (D) | October 25, 2006 | 48% | 42% | |
| Rasmussen | October 29, 2006 | 51% | 47% | |
| Reuters/Zogby | October 31, 2006 | 47% | 46% | 2% |
| Mason-Dixon/MSNBC-McClatchy | November 3, 2006 | 47% | 47% | 1% |
| Rasmussen | November 3, 2006 | 50% | 46% | |
| USA Today/Gallup | November 4, 2006 | 50% | 41% | |
| Rasmussen | November 4, 2006 | 50% | 48% | |
| OnPoint Polling and Research | November 6, 2006 | 49% | 44% | |

=== Results ===
Tester narrowly defeated Burns on election day by just over 3,000 votes. Libertarian candidate Jones received over 10,000 votes, greater than Tester's margin of victory. Due to errors with polling machines, the Montana count was delayed well into Wednesday, November 8. The race was too close to call throughout the night and many pundits predicted the need for a recount. After a very close election, on November 9, incumbent Burns conceded defeat.

Just before 11:00 AM (MST) on November 8, Tester was declared senator-elect for Montana in USA Today. At 2:27 PM EST on November 8, CNN projected that Tester would win the race.

Under Montana law, if the margin of defeat is more than 0.25% but less than 0.5%, the losing candidate can request a recount if they pay for it themselves. However, this election did not qualify for a recount because the margin was larger than 0.5%. Burns conceded the race on November 9 and congratulated Tester on his victory.

2006 United States Senate election in Montana
| Party | Candidate | Votes | % | ±% |
|---|---|---|---|---|
| Democratic | Jon Tester | 199,845 | 49.16% | +1.92% |
| Republican | Conrad Burns (incumbent) | 196,283 | 48.29% | −2.27% |
| Libertarian | Stan Jones | 10,377 | 2.55% | N/A |
| Total votes | | 406,505 | 100.00% | N/A |
| Democratic gain from Republican | | | | |

==== By county ====
| | Jon Tester Democratic | | Conrad Burns Republican | | Stan Jones Libertarian | | Margin | | Total |
| County | Votes | % | Votes | % | Votes | % | Votes | % | Votes |
|---|---|---|---|---|---|---|---|---|---|
| Beaverhead | 1,376 | 34.14% | 2,552 | 63.31% | 103 | 2.56% | 1,176 | 29.17% | 4,031 |
| Big Horn | 2,999 | 64.72% | 1,551 | 33.47% | 84 | 1.81% | 1,448 | 31.25% | 4,634 |
| Blaine | 1,390 | 51.90% | 1,226 | 45.78% | 62 | 2.32% | 164 | 6.12% | 2,678 |
| Broadwater | 825 | 34.93% | 1,451 | 61.43% | 86 | 3.64% | 626 | 26.50% | 2,362 |
| Carbon | 2,247 | 45.92% | 2,510 | 51.30% | 136 | 2.78% | 263 | 5.38% | 4,893 |
| Carter | 98 | 14.71% | 554 | 83.18% | 14 | 2.10% | 456 | 68.47% | 666 |
| Cascade | 14,947 | 49.37% | 14,789 | 48.85% | 540 | 1.78% | 158 | 0.52% | 30,276 |
| Chouteau | 1,491 | 51.86% | 1,345 | 46.78% | 39 | 1.36% | 146 | 5.08% | 2,875 |
| Custer | 1,991 | 42.36% | 2,581 | 54.91% | 128 | 2.72% | 590 | 12.55% | 4,700 |
| Daniels | 424 | 40.77% | 594 | 57.12% | 22 | 2.12% | 170 | 16.35% | 1,040 |
| Dawson | 1,595 | 40.31% | 2,247 | 56.79% | 115 | 2.91% | 652 | 16.48% | 3,957 |
| Deer Lodge | 3,211 | 72.63% | 1,096 | 24.79% | 114 | 2.58% | 2,115 | 47.84% | 4,421 |
| Fallon | 347 | 26.31% | 951 | 72.10% | 21 | 1.59% | 604 | 45.79% | 1,319 |
| Fergus | 1,985 | 35.25% | 3,474 | 61.68% | 173 | 3.07% | 1,489 | 26.44% | 5,632 |
| Flathead | 13,276 | 40.24% | 18,511 | 56.10% | 1,209 | 3.66% | 5,235 | 15.87% | 32,996 |
| Gallatin | 16,511 | 48.67% | 16,693 | 49.21% | 720 | 2.12% | 182 | 0.54% | 33,924 |
| Garfield | 98 | 16.58% | 483 | 81.73% | 10 | 1.69% | 385 | 65.14% | 591 |
| Glacier | 2,748 | 62.37% | 1,564 | 35.50% | 94 | 2.13% | 1,184 | 26.87% | 4,406 |
| Golden Valley | 181 | 37.24% | 298 | 61.32% | 7 | 1.44% | 117 | 24.07% | 486 |
| Granite | 594 | 39.13% | 862 | 56.79% | 62 | 4.08% | 268 | 17.65% | 1,518 |
| Hill | 3,411 | 58.33% | 2,320 | 39.67% | 117 | 2.00% | 1,091 | 18.66% | 5,848 |
| Jefferson | 2,415 | 45.76% | 2,715 | 51.44% | 148 | 2.80% | 300 | 5.68% | 5,278 |
| Judith Basin | 377 | 31.63% | 785 | 65.86% | 30 | 2.52% | 408 | 34.23% | 1,192 |
| Lake | 5,618 | 48.81% | 5,480 | 47.61% | 413 | 3.59% | 138 | 1.20% | 11,511 |
| Lewis and Clark | 14,921 | 54.74% | 11,734 | 43.05% | 604 | 2.22% | 3,187 | 11.69% | 27,259 |
| Liberty | 401 | 39.66% | 596 | 58.95% | 14 | 1.38% | 195 | 19.29% | 1,011 |
| Lincoln | 2,860 | 39.17% | 4,105 | 56.23% | 336 | 4.60% | 1,245 | 17.05% | 7,301 |
| Madison | 1,224 | 33.68% | 2,311 | 63.59% | 99 | 2.72% | 1,087 | 29.91% | 3,634 |
| McCone | 394 | 37.88% | 624 | 60.00% | 22 | 2.12% | 230 | 22.12% | 1,040 |
| Meagher | 272 | 32.19% | 552 | 65.33% | 21 | 2.49% | 280 | 33.14% | 845 |
| Mineral | 796 | 48.98% | 779 | 47.94% | 50 | 3.08% | 17 | 1.05% | 1,625 |
| Missoula | 29,327 | 63.92% | 15,610 | 34.02% | 942 | 2.05% | 13,717 | 29.90% | 45,879 |
| Musselshell | 670 | 31.16% | 1,382 | 64.28% | 98 | 4.56% | 712 | 33.12% | 2,150 |
| Park | 3,731 | 50.60% | 3,441 | 46.67% | 201 | 2.73% | 290 | 3.93% | 7,373 |
| Petroleum | 74 | 29.43% | 180 | 67.92% | 11 | 4.15% | 106 | 40.00% | 265 |
| Phillips | 559 | 28.18% | 1,366 | 68.85% | 59 | 2.97% | 807 | 40.68% | 1,984 |
| Pondera | 1,080 | 41.08% | 1,494 | 56.83% | 55 | 2.09% | 414 | 15.75% | 2,629 |
| Powder River | 248 | 24.55% | 734 | 72.67% | 28 | 2.77% | 486 | 48.12% | 1,010 |
| Powell | 1,052 | 40.48% | 1,454 | 55.94% | 93 | 3.58% | 402 | 15.47% | 2,599 |
| Prairie | 213 | 31.09% | 455 | 66.42% | 17 | 2.48% | 242 | 35.33% | 685 |
| Ravalli | 7,906 | 42.41% | 10,273 | 55.11% | 462 | 2.48% | 2,367 | 12.70% | 18,641 |
| Richland | 1,354 | 35.22% | 2,381 | 61.94% | 109 | 2.84% | 1,027 | 26.72% | 3,844 |
| Roosevelt | 2,203 | 57.47% | 1,573 | 41.04% | 57 | 1.49% | 630 | 16.44% | 3,833 |
| Rosebud | 1,895 | 55.31% | 1,425 | 32.15% | 106 | 3.09% | 470 | 13.72% | 3,426 |
| Sanders | 2,165 | 43.53% | 2,575 | 51.77% | 234 | 4.70% | 410 | 8.24% | 4,974 |
| Sheridan | 988 | 51.43% | 887 | 46.17% | 46 | 2.39% | 101 | 5.26% | 1,921 |
| Silver Bow | 9,500 | 66.69% | 4,394 | 30.85% | 351 | 2.46% | 5,106 | 35.84% | 14,245 |
| Stillwater | 1,556 | 39.28% | 2,262 | 57.11% | 143 | 3.61% | 706 | 17.82% | 3,961 |
| Sweet Grass | 563 | 32.39% | 1,115 | 64.15% | 60 | 3.45% | 552 | 31.76% | 1,738 |
| Teton | 1,252 | 40.80% | 1,755 | 57.18% | 62 | 2.02% | 503 | 16.39% | 3,069 |
| Toole | 759 | 37.52% | 1,195 | 59.07% | 69 | 3.41% | 436 | 21.55% | 2,023 |
| Treasure | 161 | 36.93% | 260 | 59.63% | 15 | 3.44% | 99 | 22.71% | 436 |
| Valley | 1,550 | 43.90% | 1,893 | 53.61% | 88 | 2.49% | 343 | 9,71% | 3,531 |
| Wheatland | 327 | 38.47% | 498 | 58.59% | 25 | 2.94% | 171 | 20.12% | 850 |
| Wibaux | 165 | 33.81% | 317 | 64.96% | 6 | 1.23% | 152 | 31.15% | 488 |
| Yellowstone | 27,981 | 47.77% | 29,203 | 49.85% | 1,394 | 2.38% | 1,222 | 2.09% | 58,578 |

Counties that flipped from Republican to Democratic

- Lake (largest city: Polson)
- Park (largest city: Livingston)
- Mineral (largest city: Superior)
- Sheridan (largest city: Plentywood)

== See also ==
- 2006 United States Senate elections
