= Stan Jones (Libertarian politician) =

American politician

- Jones in 2006
- Born: January 13, 1943 (age 83)
- Known for: Argyria
- Political party: Libertarian

Stan "Blueberry" Jones (born January 13, 1943) is an American politician who ran unsuccessfully for United States Senate in 2002 and 2006, and for Governor of Montana in 2000, 2004, and 2008. A member of the Libertarian Party, he is known for his artificially induced blue-grey skin tone, caused by argyria.

== Medical condition ==
In his book The Disappearing Spoon, about the periodic table, author Sam Kean chronicled the experience of Jones, who developed argyria, which permanently turned his skin a blue-grey color, by consuming large quantities of home-made colloidal silver. Jones' purposeful consumption of silver, which he believed to be an antibiotic, was a measure he undertook in response to his fears that the Y2K problem would make antibiotics unavailable, an event that did not occur. The peculiar coloration of his skin featured prominently in media coverage of his unsuccessful campaign. Jones is reported to have said, given the chance to go back, he would do it all over again. Jones is not alone in his beliefs; the use of colloidal silver has found support from actress Gwyneth Paltrow and Infowars conspiracy theorist and colloidal silver salesman Alex Jones. The National Institutes of Health have stated that "evidence supporting health-related claims (of colloidal silver) is lacking".

== Policy stances ==
His stances on policy issues tend to be socially conservative; among other issues, he supports the death penalty, opposed same-sex marriage, and has called abortion a "crime against humanity". During the senatorial debate held on October 9, 2006, Jones proposed the unfounded conspiracy theory that a collaboration of European Union and North American elites are on the verge of forming a "one world communist government".

== See also ==
- Paul Karason, a man with a similar case of argyria caused by consumption of colloidal silver
