= 2012 Montana Attorney General election =

- November 6, 2012
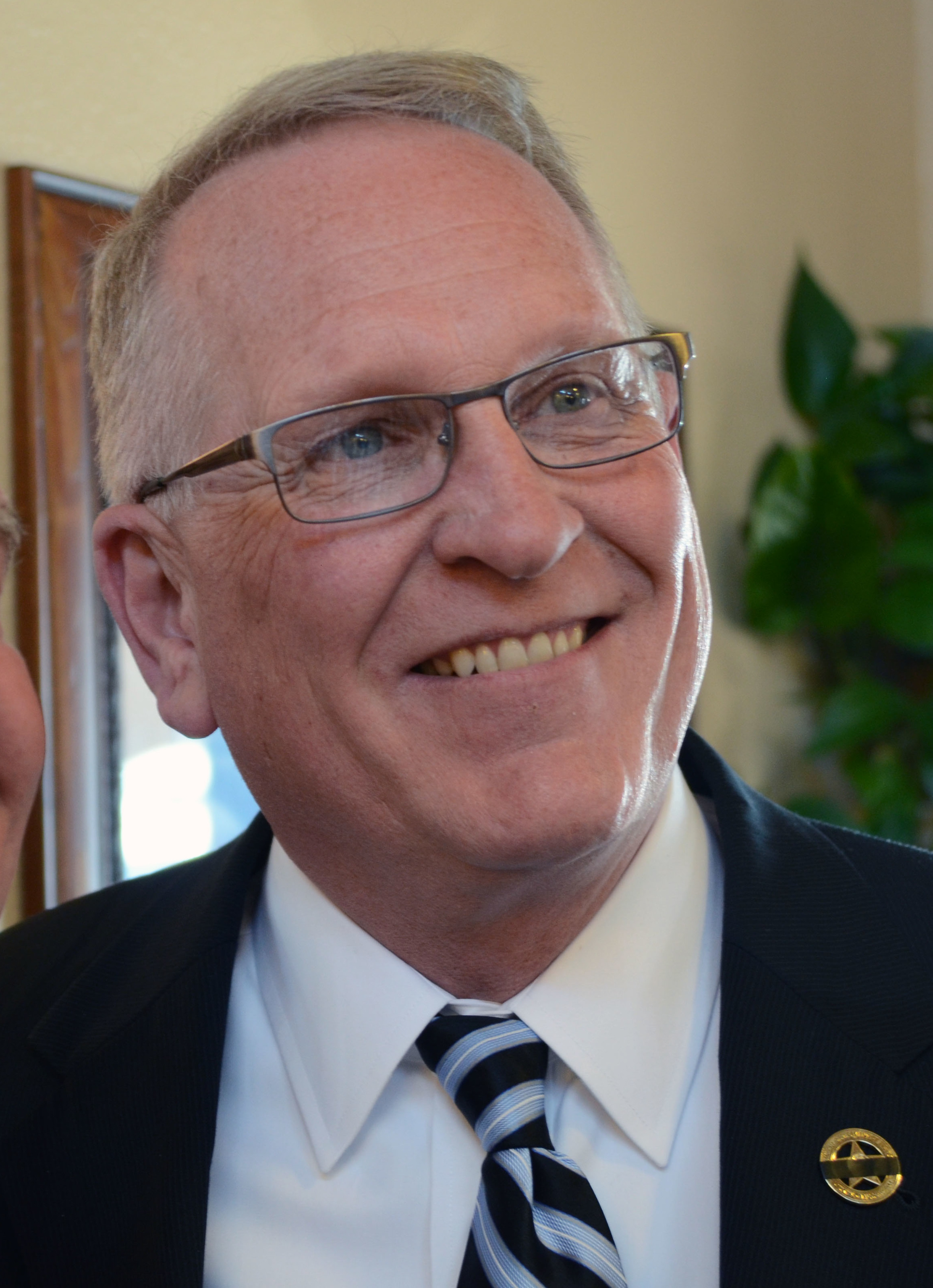

Nominee	Tim Fox	Pam Bucy
Party	Republican	Democratic
Popular vote	252,916	218,228
Percentage	53.68%	46.32%
- County results Fox: 50–60% 60–70% 70–80% 80–90% Bucy: 50–60% 60–70%
Attorney General before election
Steve Bullock
Democratic
Elected Attorney General
Tim Fox
Republican

The 2012 Montana Attorney General election was held on November 6, 2012, to elect the Attorney General of Montana. Democratic incumbent Steve Bullock chose not to run for re-election, instead running for Governor of Montana. Republican attorney and previously unsuccessful 2008 candidate for this seat Tim Fox won the election, defeating Democrat Pam Bucy by seven percentage points. As of 2026, this is the last Montana Attorney General election to be decided by less than ten percentage points.

== Democratic primary ==
=== Candidates ===
- Pam Bucy, Administrative Counsel for the Montana Department of Labor
- Jesse Laslovich, former Montana state senator (2005–2010)

=== Results ===
Democratic primary results
Party	Candidate	Votes	%
Democratic	Pam Bucy	42,035	50.53%
Democratic	Jesse Laslovich	41,148	49.47%
Total votes		83,183	100.00%

== Republican primary ==
=== Candidates ===
- Tim Fox, attorney and 2008 Republican nominee for Montana Attorney General
- Jim Shockley, Montana state senator (2004–2012)

=== Results ===
Republican primary results
Party	Candidate	Votes	%
Republican	Tim Fox	70,239	57.77%
Republican	Jim Shockley	51,343	42.23%
Total votes		121,582	100.00%

== General election ==
=== Candidates ===
- Tim Fox, attorney and 2008 Republican nominee for Montana Attorney General (Republican)
- Pam Bucy, Administrative Counsel for the Montana Department of Labor (Democratic)

=== Results ===
2012 Montana Attorney General election results
Party	Candidate	Votes	%	±%
Republican	Tim Fox	252,916	53.68%	+6.18%
Democratic	Pam Bucy	218,228	46.32%	−6.18%
Total votes		471,144	100.00%	
Republican gain from Democratic				
