= Bill McChesney =

Bill McChesney may refer to:

- Bill McChesney (politician) (born 1948), former member of the Montana House of Representatives
- Bill McChesney (athlete) (1959–1992), American long-distance runner
