= 2016 Montana gubernatorial election =

- November 8, 2016
- Turnout: 74.44%▲2.26
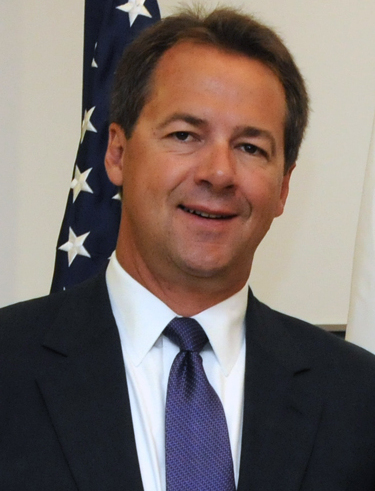

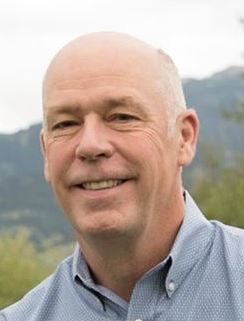
Nominee	Steve Bullock	Greg Gianforte
Party	Democratic	Republican
Running mate	Mike Cooney	Lesley Robinson
Popular vote	255,933	236,115
Percentage	50.25%	46.35%
- Bullock: 40–50% 50–60% 60–70% 70–80% 80–90% >90% Gianforte: 40–50% 50–60% 60–70% 70–80% 80–90% >90% No votes
Governor before election
Steve Bullock
Democratic
Elected Governor
Steve Bullock
Democratic

The 2016 Montana gubernatorial election took place on November 8, 2016, to elect the governor and lieutenant governor of Montana, concurrently with the presidential election, as well as elections to the United States Senate and elections to the United States House of Representatives and various state and local elections.

Incumbent Democratic governor Steve Bullock won re-election to a second term in office with 50.3% of the vote by a 3.9% margin, defeating Republican Greg Gianforte, who later won Montana's governorship in 2020 when Bullock was term-limited.

In the concurrent presidential election, Hillary Clinton lost Montana by more than 20%, with Bullock thus over-performing her vote share by more than 14% and her margin of defeat by more than 24%.

As of 2026, this is the most recent election where a Democrat won the Governor's office and/or a state level office.

== Democratic primary ==
=== Candidates ===
==== Nominee ====
- Steve Bullock, incumbent governor

- Running mate: Mike Cooney, incumbent lieutenant governor

==== Eliminated in primary ====
- Bill McChesney, former state representative

- Running mate: Mike Anderson

=== Results ===
Democratic primary results
Party	Candidate	Votes	%
Democratic	Steve Bullock (incumbent)	109,450	91.3%
Democratic	Bill McChesney	10,486	8.7%
Total votes		119,936	100.0%

== Republican primary ==
=== Candidates ===
==== Nominee ====
- Greg Gianforte, founder of RightNow Technologies and conservative activist

- Running mate: Lesley Robinson, Phillips County Commissioner

==== Eliminated in primary ====
- Terry Nelson, planning administrator for Ravalli County, Montana

- Running mate: Niki Sardot

==== Withdrawn ====
- Brad Johnson, chairman of the Montana Public Service Commission and former secretary of state of Montana
- Mark Perea, businessman and nominee for the state senate in 2012 (did not file)

==== Declined ====
- Taylor Brown, state senator
- Jeff Essman, state representative and former president of the State Senate
- Tim Fox, Attorney General of Montana (running for re-election)
- Ryan Zinke, U.S. representative (running for re-election)

=== Endorsements ===
Greg Gianforte

U.S. senators

- Conrad Burns, former U.S. senator
- Steve Daines, U.S. senator

State officials

- Tim Fox, Attorney General of Montana
- Rick Hill, former U.S. representative and 2012 GOP gubernatorial nominee
- Ron Marlenee, former U.S. representative
- Judy Martz, former governor of Montana
- Marc Racicot, former governor of Montana
- Denny Rehberg, former U.S. representative
- Stan Stephens, former governor of Montana
- Ryan Zinke, U.S. representative

Organizations

- Montana Chamber of Commerce
- Montana Farm Bureau Federation
- National Federation of Independent Business

=== Results ===
Republican primary results
Party	Candidate	Votes	%
Republican	Greg Gianforte	109,882	76.4%
Republican	Terry Nelson	33,987	23.6%
Total votes		143,869	100.0%

== Third parties ==
=== Independent ===
==== Declared ====
- Christopher Zarcone

=== Libertarian ===
==== Declared ====
- Ted Dunlap, perennial candidate

- Running mate: Ron Vandevender, perennial candidate

==== Withdrew ====
- Ron Vandevender, perennial candidate

== General election ==
=== Debates ===
- Complete video of debate, September 19, 2016 - C-SPAN

=== Endorsements ===
Greg Gianforte

Governors

- Marc Racicot, Montana (former)
- Judy Martz, Montana (former)

State officials

- Tim Fox, Montana Attorney General

U.S. senators

- Steve Daines, Montana
- Conrad Burns, Montana (former) (deceased)

U.S. representatives

- Rick Hill, Montana's at-large congressional district (former)
- Ron Marlenee, Montana's 2nd congressional district (former)
- Denny Rehberg, Montana's at-large congressional district (former)
- Ryan Zinke, Montana's at-large congressional district

Organizations

- Gun Owners of America
- Montana Chamber of Commerce
- Montana Farm Bureau Federation PAC
- National Federation of Independent Business
- National Rifle Association of America
- Susan B. Anthony List

=== Predictions ===
Source	Ranking	As of
The Cook Political Report	Lean D	August 12, 2016
Daily Kos	Lean D	November 8, 2016
Rothenberg Political Report	Lean D	November 3, 2016
Sabato's Crystal Ball	Lean D	November 7, 2016
Real Clear Politics	Lean D	November 1, 2016
Governing	Tossup	October 27, 2016

=== Polling ===
Poll source	Date(s) administered	Sample size	Margin of error	Steve Bullock (D)	Greg Gianforte (R)	Ted Dunlap (L)	Undecided
SurveyMonkey	November 1–7, 2016	449	± 4.6%	44%	46%	7%	3%
SurveyMonkey	October 31–November 6, 2016	410	± 4.6%	45%	44%	8%	3%
SurveyMonkey	October 28–November 3, 2016	403	± 4.6%	46%	46%	7%	1%
SurveyMonkey	October 27–November 2, 2016	376	± 4.6%	48%	43%	7%	2%
SurveyMonkey	October 26–November 1, 2016	385	± 4.6%	51%	41%	7%	1%
SurveyMonkey	October 25–31, 2016	405	± 4.6%	53%	39%	7%	1%
Mason-Dixon	October 10–12, 2016	1,003	± 3.2%	47%	45%	2%	6%
Montana State University Billings	October 3–10, 2016	590	± 4.0%	44%	32%	3%	20%

Hypothetical polling

with Ryan Zinke

Poll source	Date(s) administered	Sample size	Margin of error	Steve Bullock (D)	Ryan Zinke (R)	Other	Undecided
Gravis Marketing	February 24–25, 2015	1,035	± 3%	44%	44%	—	11%
Gravis Marketing	November 24–25, 2014	836	± 3%	41%	49%	—	10%

with Tim Fox

Poll source	Date(s) administered	Sample size	Margin of error	Steve Bullock (D)	Tim Fox (R)	Other	Undecided
Gravis Marketing	February 24–25, 2015	1,035	± 3%	46%	38%	—	16%
Gravis Marketing	November 24–25, 2014	836	± 3%	41%	45%	—	14%
Public Policy Polling	July 20–22, 2013	741	± 4%	46%	43%	—	11%

=== Results ===
2016 Montana gubernatorial election
Party	Candidate	Votes	%	±%
Democratic	Steve Bullock (incumbent)	255,933	50.25%	+1.35%
Republican	Greg Gianforte	236,115	46.35%	−0.99%
Libertarian	Ted Dunlap	17,312	3.40%	−0.36%
Total votes		509,360	100.00%	N/A
Democratic hold				

Counties that flipped from Republican to Democratic

- Park (largest city: Livingston)
