= 2008 Montana Attorney General election =

- November 4, 2008
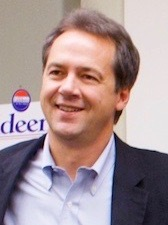

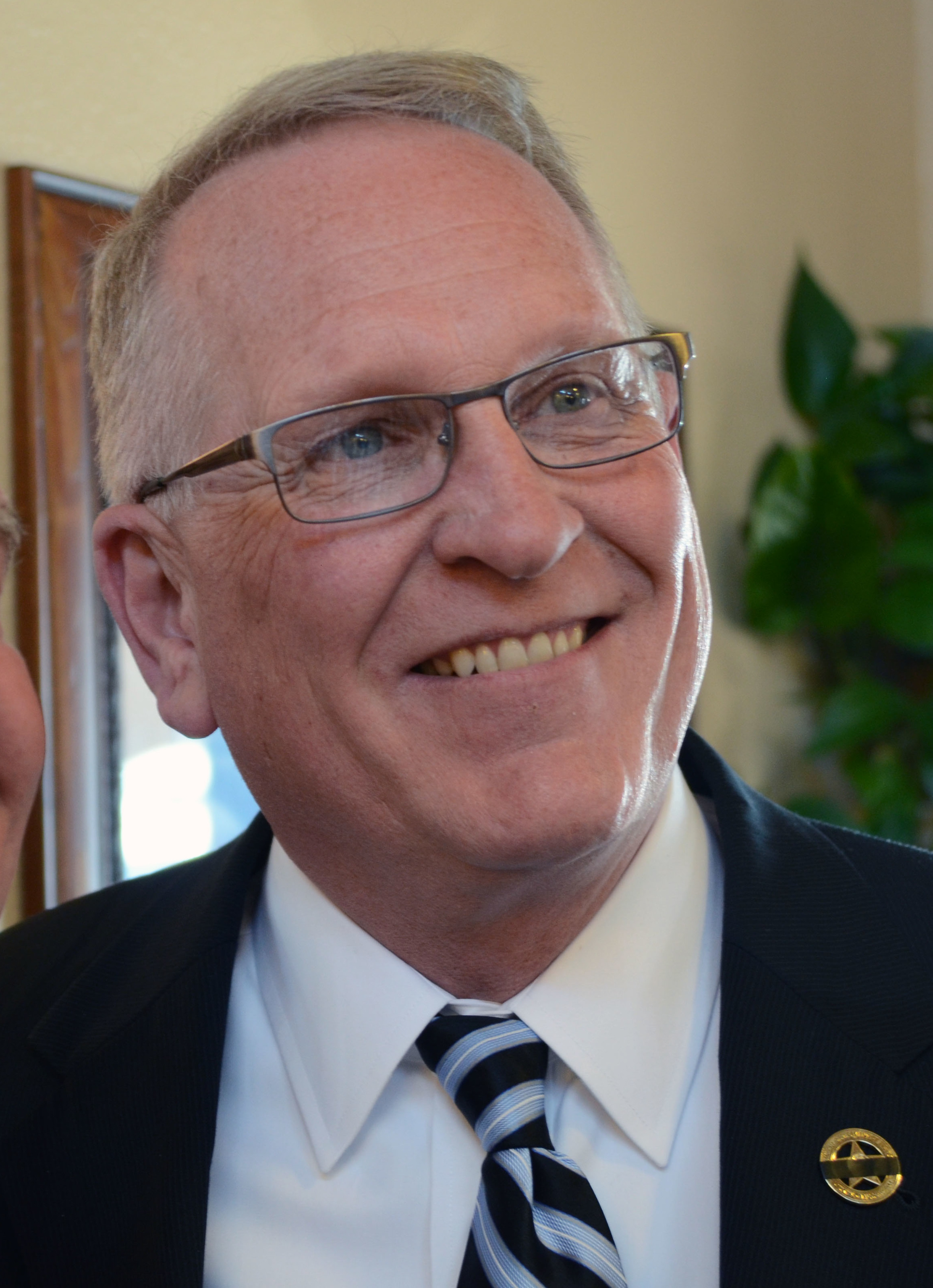
Nominee	Steve Bullock	Tim Fox
Party	Democratic	Republican
Popular vote	243,652	220,459
Percentage	52.50%	47.50%
- County results Bullock: 50–60% 60–70% 70–80% Fox: 50–60% 60–70% 70–80% Tie: 50%
Attorney General before election
Mike McGrath
Democratic
Elected Attorney General
Steve Bullock
Democratic

The 2008 Montana Attorney General election was held on November 4, 2008, to elect the Attorney General of Montana. Democratic incumbent Mike McGrath was term-limited and instead ran for Chief Justice of the Montana Supreme Court. Democratic lawyer Steve Bullock won the election, defeating Republican attorney Tim Fox by five percentage points. As of 2026, this is the last time a Democrat has been elected Attorney General of Montana.

== Democratic primary ==
=== Candidates ===
- Steve Bullock, private practice lawyer
- Mike Wheat, former Montana state senator (2002–2005)
- John Parker, Montana state representative (2002–2008)

=== Results ===
Democratic primary results
Party	Candidate	Votes	%
Democratic	Steve Bullock	63,276	42.04%
Democratic	Mike Wheat	54,859	36.45%
Democratic	John Parker	32,362	21.51%
Total votes		150,497	100.00%

== Republican primary ==
=== Candidates ===
- Tim Fox, private practice attorney and former Assistant Montana Attorney General
- Lee Bruner, attorney

=== Results ===
Republican primary results
Party	Candidate	Votes	%
Republican	Tim Fox	43,662	56.64%
Republican	Lee Bruner	33,424	43.36%
Total votes		77,086	100.00%

== General election ==
=== Candidates ===
- Steve Bullock, private practice lawyer (Democratic)
- Tim Fox, private practice attorney and former Assistant Montana Attorney General (Republican)

=== Results ===
2008 Montana Attorney General election results
Party	Candidate	Votes	%	±%
Democratic	Steve Bullock	243,652	52.50%	−47.50%
Republican	Tim Fox	220,459	47.50%	N/A
Total votes		464,111	100.00%	
Democratic hold				
