= 2020 Montana gubernatorial election =

- November 3, 2020
- Turnout: 81.33%▲6.89
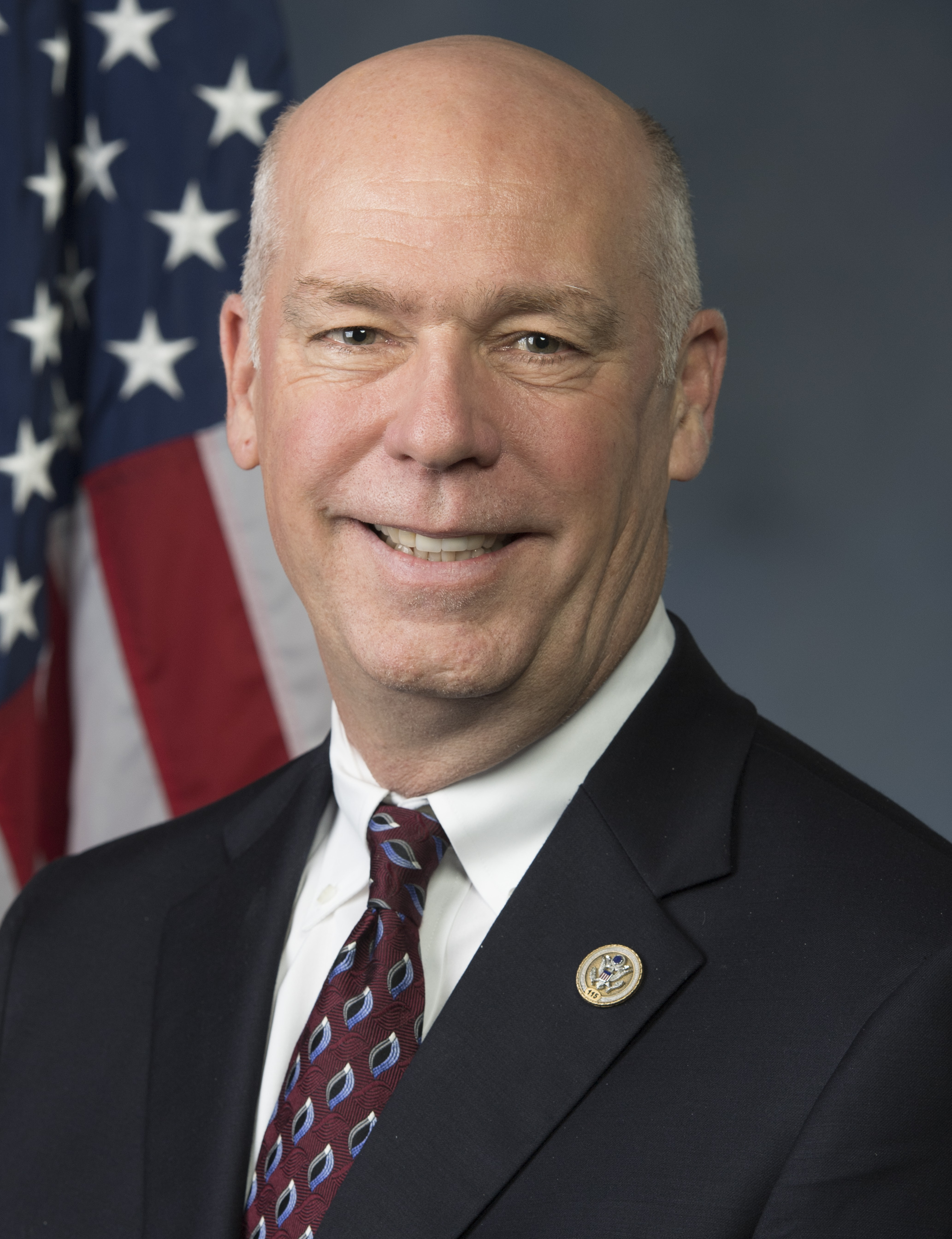

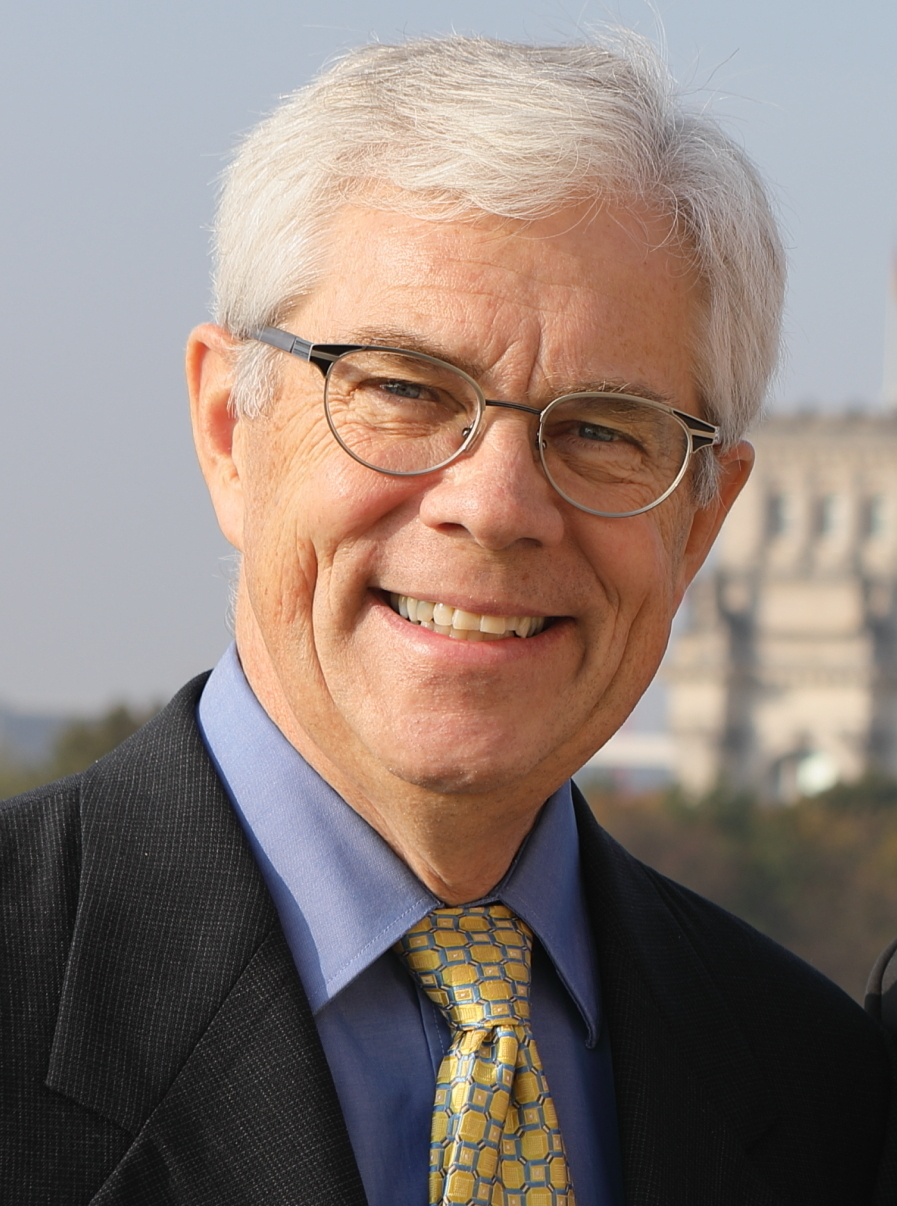
Nominee	Greg Gianforte	Mike Cooney
Party	Republican	Democratic
Running mate	Kristen Juras	Casey Schreiner
Popular vote	328,548	250,860
Percentage	54.43%	41.56%
- Gianforte: 40–50% 50–60% 60–70% 70–80% 80–90% >90% Cooney: 40–50% 50–60% 60–70% 70–80% 80–90% >90% No data
Governor before election
Steve Bullock
Democratic
Elected Governor
Greg Gianforte
Republican

The 2020 Montana gubernatorial election was held on November 3, 2020, to elect the next governor of Montana, concurrently with the U.S. presidential election, as well as elections to the U.S. Senate and the House of Representatives and various state and local elections. It resulted in voters selecting Greg Gianforte over Mike Cooney. Incumbent Democratic governor Steve Bullock was term-limited and could not seek a third consecutive term in office, and he ran unsuccessfully for Montana's Class II Senate seat.

Bullock's lieutenant governor, Mike Cooney, was the Democratic nominee, while the Republican nominee was Montana's at-large representative Greg Gianforte, who won the election, making him the first Republican governor of Montana since Judy Martz left office in 2005. This was the only gubernatorial seat to change partisan control in the 2020 elections. This election marked the first time since the 1920s that Republicans controlled all state constitutional offices and a majority of the legislature.

== Democratic primary ==
=== Candidates ===
==== Nominee ====
- Mike Cooney, lieutenant governor of Montana and former Secretary of State of Montana and candidate in 2000
  - Running mate: Casey Schreiner, minority leader of the Montana House of Representatives

==== Eliminated in primary ====
- Whitney Williams, businesswoman and daughter of former U.S. Representative Pat Williams
  - Running mate: Buzz Mattelin, farmer and president of the National Barley Growers Association

==== Withdrawn ====
- Reilly Neill, former state representative
- Casey Schreiner, minority leader of the Montana House of Representatives (running for lieutenant governor)

==== Declined ====
- Ryan Busse, businessman
- Wilmot Collins, mayor of Helena and former 2020 candidate for the U.S. Senate
- John Heenan, attorney and candidate for Montana's at-large congressional district in 2018
- Michael Punke, writer and former U.S. ambassador to the World Trade Organization
- Brian Schweitzer, former governor of Montana (endorsed Williams)
- Kathleen Williams, former state representative and nominee for Montana's at-large congressional district in 2018 (running for the U.S. House)

=== Endorsements ===
Mike Cooney

Statewide politicians

- Jacob Bachmeier, state representative
- Steve Bullock, incumbent governor of Montana and former candidate for president in 2020
- Mary Ann Dunwell, state representative
- Moffie Funk, state representative

Federal politicians

- Jon Tester, U.S. senator (MT)

Organizations

- AFL–CIO Montana
- International Brotherhood of Teamsters Local 190
Whitney Williams

Statewide politicians

- Brian Schweitzer, former governor of Montana

Local politicians

- John Engen, mayor of Missoula

Organizations

- EMILY's List

=== Polling ===
Polls with a sample size of <100 have their sample size entries marked in red to indicate a lack of reliability.

Poll source	Date(s) administered	Sample size (Note: Key: A – all adults RV – registered voters LV – likely voters V – unclear)	Margin of error	Mike Cooney	Reilly Neill	Casey Schreiner	Whitney Williams	Other / Undecided
Montana State University Billings	October 7–16, 2019	40 (LV)	–	19%	2%	6%	11%	62%

=== Results ===
Results by county Cooney: 50–60%; 60–70%; 70–80%; Williams: 50–60%; Tie: 50–60%

Democratic primary results
Party	Candidate	Votes	%
Democratic	Mike Cooney	81,527	54.86%
Democratic	Whitney Williams	67,066	45.14%
Total votes		148,593	100.00%

== Republican primary ==
=== Candidates ===
==== Nominee ====
- Greg Gianforte, incumbent U.S. representative for Montana's at-large congressional district and nominee for governor of Montana in 2016

- Running mate: Kristen Juras, businesswoman and attorney

==== Eliminated in primary ====
- Tim Fox, Attorney General of Montana

- Running mate: Jon Knokey, former state representative

- Albert Olszewski, state senator and candidate for U.S. Senate in 2018

- Running mate: Kenneth Bogner, state senator

==== Withdrawn ====
- Gary Perry, former state senator
- Corey Stapleton, Secretary of State of Montana, candidate for governor of Montana in 2012 and candidate for the U.S. House in 2014 (running for the U.S. House)
- Pete Ziehli

==== Declined ====
- Matt Rosendale, Montana State Auditor and nominee for the U.S. Senate in 2018 (running for the U.S. House)
- Ryan Zinke, former United States Secretary of Interior and former U.S. representative for Montana's at-large congressional district

=== Endorsements ===
Greg Gianforte

Individuals

- Donald Trump Jr., businessman, son of President Donald Trump

Organizations

- Crow Tribe of Montana
- Susan B. Anthony List

=== Polling ===
Polls with a sample size of <100 have their sample size entries marked in red to indicate a lack of reliability.

Poll source	Date(s) administered	Sample size	Margin of error	Tim Fox	Greg Gianforte	Albert Olszewski	Other / Undecided
Montana State University Billings	October 7–16, 2019	99 (LV)	–	25%	33%	9%	32%
Gravis Marketing	August 28–30, 2019	433 (RV)	± 4.7%	29%	56%	15%	–
Moore Information (Note: Commissioned by Gianforte)	July 7–10, 2019	400 (LV)	± 5.0%	17%	56%	5%	23%

=== Results ===
Results by county Gianforte: 40–50%; 50–60%; 60–70%; 70–80%; Fox: 40–50%; 50–60%

Republican primary results
Party	Candidate	Votes	%
Republican	Greg Gianforte	119,247	53.44%
Republican	Tim Fox	60,823	27.26%
Republican	Albert Olszewski	43,080	19.30%
Total votes		223,150	100.00%

== Other candidates ==
=== Libertarian Party ===
==== Nominee ====
- Lyman Bishop, founder and CEO of Hoplite Armor
  - Running mate: John Nesper

==== Withdrawn ====
- Ron Vandevender, nominee for lieutenant governor in 2016 and nominee for governor in 2012

=== Green Party ===
==== Disqualified ====
- Robert Barb
  - Running mate: Joshua Thomas

==== Results ====
Green primary results
Party	Candidate	Votes	%
Green	Robert Barb	713	100.0%
Total votes		713	100.0%

== General election ==
=== Debate ===
Host	Date & Time	Link(s)	Participants	
Host	Date & Time	Link(s)	Mike Cooney (D)	Greg Gianforte (R)
Montana PBS	October 6, 2020; 6:00pm MDT		Present	Present

=== Predictions ===
Source	Ranking	As of
The Cook Political Report	Tossup	October 23, 2020
Inside Elections	Tossup	October 28, 2020
Sabato's Crystal Ball	Lean R (flip)	November 2, 2020
Politico	Lean R (flip)	November 2, 2020
Daily Kos	Lean R (flip)	October 28, 2020
RCP	Tossup	November 2, 2020
270towin	Tossup	November 2, 2020

=== Endorsements ===
Mike Cooney (D)

Statewide and local politicians

- Jacob Bachmeier, state representative
- Steve Bullock, governor of Montana and former candidate for president in 2020
- Mary Ann Dunwell, state representative
- Moffie Funk, state representative

Federal politicians

- Jon Tester, U.S. senator (MT)

Organizations

- AFL–CIO Montana
- International Brotherhood of Teamsters Local 190
- Montana Federation of Public Employees
Greg Gianforte (R)

U.S. presidents

- Donald Trump, 45th president of the United States

Individuals

- Donald Trump Jr., businessman, son of President Donald Trump

Organizations

- Crow Tribe of Montana
- Susan B. Anthony List

=== Polling ===
View source data.

Poll source	Date(s) administered	Sample size	Margin of error	Mike Cooney (D)	Greg Gianforte (R)	Other / Undecided
Change Research	October 29 – November 2, 2020	920 (LV)	± 3.5%	44%	48%	6% (Note: Bishop (L) with 3%; "Don't recall" with 2%; Did not vote with 1%; Would not vote with 0%; Undecided with 1%)
Montana State University Billings	October 19–24, 2020	546 (LV)	± 4.2%	45%	45%	11% (Note: Bishop (L) with 2%; Undecided with 9%)
Siena College/NYT Upshot	October 18–20, 2020	758 (LV)	± 4.4%	44%	48%	8% (Note: Bishop (L) with 4%; "Someone else" and would not vote with 0%; "Undecided/Refused" with 4%)
Strategies 360/NBCMT	October 15–20, 2020	500 (LV)	± 4.4%	41%	48%	11% (Note: Bishop (L) with 4%; Undecided with 7%)
RMG Research/PoliticalIQ	October 15–18, 2020	800 (LV)	± 3.5%	45% (Note: Standard VI response)	48%	5% (Note: "Some other candidate" with 2%; Undecided with 3%)
RMG Research/PoliticalIQ	October 15–18, 2020	800 (LV)	± 3.5%	47% (Note: Results generated with high Democratic turnout model)	46%	5% (Note: "Some other candidate" with 2%; Undecided with 3%)
RMG Research/PoliticalIQ	October 15–18, 2020	800 (LV)	± 3.5%	43% (Note: Results generated with high Republican turnout model)	50%	5% (Note: "Some other candidate" with 2%; Undecided with 3%)
Emerson College	October 4–7, 2020	500 (LV)	± 3.7%	41%	54%	5% (Note: "Someone else" with 1%; Undecided with 4%)
Montana State University Bozeman	September 14 – October 2, 2020	1,605 (LV)	± 3.9%	42%	47%	11% (Note: "Other" with 4% (including Bishop (L) with <2%); Undecided with 7%)
Siena College/NYT Upshot	September 14–16, 2020	625 (LV)	± 4.8%	39%	45%	16% (Note: Bishop (L) with 4%; Barb (G) and would not vote with 1%; "someone else" with 0%; "Undecided/Refused" with 10%)
Global Strategy Group (D)	August 18–23, 2020	600 (LV)	–	46%	47%	–
Emerson College	July 31 – August 2, 2020	584 (LV)	± 4.0%	41%	50%	10% (Note: "Someone else" with 3%; Undecided with 7%)
Civiqs/Daily Kos	July 11–13, 2020	873 (RV)	± 4.2%	44%	47%	9% (Note: "Someone else" with 5%; Undecided with 4%)
Public Policy Polling (Note: Poll's funding was crowdsourced by Election Twitter.)	July 9–10, 2020	1,224 (V)	± 2.8%	42%	46%	12% (Note: Undecided with 12%)
University of Montana	June 17–26, 2020	517 (RV)	± 4.3%	36%	46%	18% (Note: Undecided with 18.3%)
The Progress Campaign (D)	April 14–21, 2020	1,712 (RV)	± 4.6%	41%	43%	16% (Note: Undecided with 16%)

Hypothetical polling

with Mike Cooney, Tim Fox, Greg Gianforte, Albert Olszewski, Ron Vandevender and Whitney Williams

Poll source	Date(s) administered	Sample size	Margin of error	Democratic candidates	Republican candidates	Ron Vandevender (L)
University of Montana	February 12–22, 2020	498 (LV)	± 4.4%	35.1% (Note: Cooney with 21%; Williams with 14.1%)	61.7% (Note: Gianforte with 35%; Fox with 21.6%; Olszewski with 6.9%)	1.3%

with Mike Cooney, Tim Fox, Greg Gianforte, Reilly Neill, Albert Olszewski, Gary Perry, Casey Schreiner and Whitney Williams

Poll source	Date(s) administered	Sample size	Margin of error	Democratic candidates	Republican candidates
University of Montana	September 26 – October 3, 2019	303 (RV)	± 5.6%	40% (Note: Cooney with 23%; Williams with 7.9%; Schreiner with 6%; Neill with 3.1%)	60.1% (Note: Gianforte with 35.1%; Fox with 16.1%; Olszewski with 8.1%; Perry with 0.8%)

with Tim Fox, Matt Rosendale, Corey Stapleton, Kathleen Williams and Whitney Williams

Poll source	Date(s) administered	Sample size	Margin of error	Democratic candidates	Republican candidates	Other / Undecided
University of Montana	February 21 – March 1, 2019	293 (RV)	± 5.7%	32.4% (Note: Kathleen Williams with 26.6%; Cooney with 5.2%; Whitney Williams with 0.6%)	48.4% (Note: Fox with 16.8%; Gianforte with 16.1%; Stapleton with 8%; Rosendale with 7.5%)	19.2% (Note: "Someone else" with 15.4%; "none/do not plan to vote" with 3.8%)

=== Results ===
2020 Montana gubernatorial election
Party	Candidate	Votes	%	±%
Republican	Greg Gianforte; Kristen Juras	328,548	54.43%	+8.08%
Democratic	Mike Cooney; Casey Schreiner	250,860	41.56%	−8.69%
Libertarian	Lyman Bishop; John Nesper	24,179	4.01%	+0.61%
Write-in		21	0.00%	N/A
Total votes		603,608	100.00%	
Turnout		612,075	81.33%	
Registered electors		752,538		
Republican gain from Democratic				

==== By county ====
County	Mike Cooney Democratic		Greg Gianforte Republican		Various candidates Other parties		Margin		Total votes
County	#	%	#	%	#	%	#	%	Total votes
Beaverhead	1,668	29.49%	3,779	66.81%	209	3.70%	2,111	37.32%	5,656
Big Horn	2,513	52.42%	2,078	43.35%	203	4.23%	–435	–9.07%	4,794
Blaine	1,619	51.94%	1,365	43.79%	133	4.27%	–254	–8.15%	3,117
Broadwater	928	22.64%	3,032	73.97%	139	3.39%	2,104	51.33%	4,099
Carbon	2,498	35.30%	4,303	60.81%	275	3.89%	1,805	25.51%	7,076
Carter	91	10.62%	748	87.28%	18	2.10%	657	76.66%	857
Cascade	15,922	39.97%	22,221	55.79%	1,690	4.24%	6,299	15.81%	39,833
Chouteau	1,048	35.26%	1,816	61.10%	108	3.63%	768	25.84%	2,972
Custer	1,619	27.58%	3,971	67.65%	280	4.77%	2,352	40.07%	5,870
Daniels	217	21.51%	768	76.11%	24	2.38%	551	54.61%	1,009
Dawson	1,124	23.29%	3,524	73.02%	178	3.69%	2,400	49.73%	4,826
Deer Lodge	2,747	56.37%	1,881	38.60%	245	5.03%	–866	–17.77%	4,873
Fallon	218	14.02%	1,288	82.83%	49	3.15%	1,070	68.81%	1,555
Fergus	1,567	24.11%	4,737	72.89%	195	3.00%	3,170	48.78%	6,499
Flathead	20,387	34.08%	37,213	62.20%	2,225	3.72%	16,826	28.13%	59,825
Gallatin	36,788	51.84%	31,368	44.21%	2,802	3.95%	–5,420	–7.64%	70,958
Garfield	48	5.90%	751	92.37%	14	1.72%	703	86.47%	813
Glacier	3,730	65.62%	1,709	30.07%	245	4.31%	–2,021	–35.56%	5,684
Golden Valley	80	15.90%	409	81.31%	14	2.78%	329	65.41%	503
Granite	659	31.47%	1,348	64.37%	87	4.15%	689	32.90%	2,094
Hill	3,146	43.80%	3,642	50.71%	394	5.49%	496	6.91%	7,182
Jefferson	2,791	34.16%	5,097	62.38%	283	3.46%	2,306	28.22%	8,171
Judith Basin	281	20.88%	1,017	75.56%	48	3.57%	736	54.68%	1,346
Lake	6,885	41.50%	8,913	53.72%	794	4.79%	2,028	12.22%	16,592
Lewis and Clark	21,022	49.53%	19,969	47.05%	1,449	3.41%	–1,053	–2.48%	42,440
Liberty	268	24.75%	788	72.76%	27	2.49%	520	48.01%	1,083
Lincoln	3,001	25.64%	8,279	70.72%	426	3.64%	5,278	45.09%	11,706
Madison	1,877	30.83%	3,992	65.57%	219	3.60%	2,115	34.74%	6,088
McCone	165	14.77%	921	82.45%	31	2.78%	756	67.68%	1,117
Meagher	256	23.02%	823	74.01%	33	2.97%	567	50.99%	1,112
Mineral	706	27.66%	1,715	67.20%	131	5.13%	1,009	39.54%	2,552
Missoula	43,426	60.66%	25,448	35.55%	2,711	3.79%	–17,978	–25.11%	71,585
Musselshell	450	15.68%	2,318	80.77%	102	3.55%	1,868	65.09%	2,870
Park	5,364	46.32%	5,798	50.07%	418	3.61%	434	3.75%	11,580
Petroleum	44	12.57%	299	85.43%	7	2.00%	255	72.86%	350
Phillips	412	17.36%	1,908	80.40%	53	2.23%	1,496	63.04%	2,373
Pondera	912	30.43%	1,981	66.10%	104	3.47%	1,069	35.67%	2,997
Powder River	162	14.35%	943	83.53%	24	2.13%	781	69.18%	1,129
Powell	849	26.64%	2,212	69.41%	126	3.95%	1,363	42.77%	3,187
Prairie	160	21.92%	544	74.52%	26	3.56%	384	52.60%	730
Ravalli	8,883	31.17%	18,557	65.11%	1,063	3.73%	9,674	33.94%	28,503
Richland	1,017	17.67%	4,506	78.31%	231	4.01%	3,489	60.64%	5,754
Roosevelt	1,961	48.94%	1,859	46.39%	187	4.67%	–102	–2.55%	4,007
Rosebud	1,236	32.99%	2,363	63.06%	148	3.95%	1,127	30.08%	3,747
Sanders	1,870	24.65%	5,346	70.47%	370	4.88%	3,476	45.82%	7,586
Sheridan	634	31.45%	1,300	64.48%	82	4.07%	666	33.04%	2,016
Silver Bow	11,495	61.23%	6,490	34.57%	788	4.20%	–5,005	–26.66%	18,773
Stillwater	1,263	22.06%	4,292	74.96%	171	2.99%	3,029	52.90%	5,726
Sweet Grass	553	22.59%	1,801	73.57%	94	3.84%	1,248	50.98%	2,448
Teton	1,053	28.58%	2,497	67.76%	135	3.66%	1,444	39.19%	3,685
Toole	468	22.10%	1,546	72.99%	104	4.91%	1,078	50.90%	2,118
Treasure	89	19.35%	358	77.83%	13	2.83%	269	58.48%	460
Valley	1,182	27.82%	2,899	68.24%	167	3.93%	1,717	40.42%	4,248
Wheatland	251	23.68%	767	72.36%	42	3.96%	516	48.68%	1,060
Wibaux	105	17.95%	465	79.49%	15	2.56%	360	61.54%	585
Yellowstone	31,152	37.18%	48,586	57.99%	4,051	4.83%	17,434	20.81%	83,789
Totals	250,860	41.56%	328,548	54.43%	24,200	4.01%	77,688	12.87%	603,608

Counties that flipped from Democratic to Republican

- Cascade (largest city: Great Falls)
- Hill (largest city: Havre)
- Lake (largest city: Polson)
- Park (largest city: Livingston)

== Notes ==
Partisan clients
