= Kristen Juras =

American politician (born 1955)

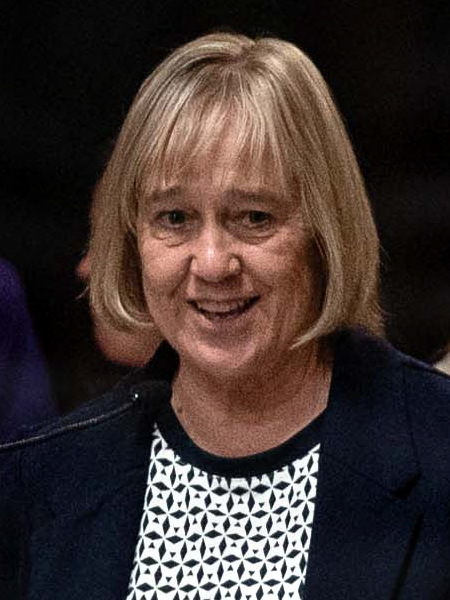
- Juras in 2026

37th Lieutenant Governor of Montana
- Incumbent
- Assumed office January 4, 2021
- Governor: Greg Gianforte
- Preceded by: Mike Cooney

Personal details
- Born: Kristen Gustafson; October 16, 1955 (age 71) Conrad, Montana, U.S.
- Party: Republican
- Spouse: John Juras
- Children: 3
- Relatives: Wylie Gustafson (brother)
- Education: University of Montana (BA); University of Georgia (JD)

Kristen Juras (née Gustafson; born October 16, 1955) is an American politician, businesswoman, attorney, and law professor who has been serving as the 37th lieutenant governor of Montana since 2021 as a member of the Republican Party.

== Early life and education ==
Born in Conrad, Montana, Juras graduated from Conrad High School in 1973. She earned a Bachelor of Arts from the University of Montana in 1977 and a Juris Doctor from the University of Georgia School of Law in 1982.

== Career ==
Juras entered private practice in Georgia and Oklahoma City before returning to Montana in 1988. She works as an adjunct law professor at the University of Montana's Alexander Blewett III School of Law. Juras sought election to the Montana Supreme Court seat vacated by Patricia O'Brien Cotter in 2016. She advanced to the general election, though lost to Dirk Sandefur.

In March 2020, then-Congressman Greg Gianforte, selected Juras as his running mate in the 2020 Montana gubernatorial election. They won the nomination in the Republican primary, and faced incumbent Lieutenant Governor Mike Cooney and Montana Representative Casey Schreiner in the November general election. Gianforte and Juras won the election, and were sworn into office on January 4, 2021.

In June 2022, Juras served as acting governor while Gianforte was out of the country, and declared a state of emergency regarding flooding near Red Lodge, Montana. Gianforte and Juras were reelected to a second term in 2024.

== Personal life ==
Juras and her husband John have three sons. Her younger brother is country musician Wylie Gustafson.

Party political offices
Preceded by Lesley Robinson	Republican nominee for Lieutenant Governor of Montana; 2020, 2024	Most recent
Political offices
Preceded by Mike Cooney	Lieutenant Governor of Montana; 2021–present	Incumbent
