= Ben Jacobs (journalist) =

American political reporter

- Education: Grinnell College (BA); Duke University (JD)
- Occupation: Journalist
- Employer: The Guardian

Ben Jacobs is an American political reporter. He formerly worked for The Guardian, where he gained mass media attention for being assaulted by Republican congressional candidate Greg Gianforte in May 2017. He previously worked at The Daily Beast. His journalism has also been published in outlets including The Boston Globe, The New Republic, The Atlantic, Jewish Insider, New York Magazine, and the online news sites Salon and Capital New York. Jacobs has covered people such as Donald Trump and Chelsea Clinton.

== Education ==
While studying at Grinnell College, Jacobs was president of the Iowa College Democrats. After graduating in 2006, he worked in electoral politics. Jacobs later graduated from Duke University School of Law.

== Journalism career ==
Jacobs was a freelance reporter for The New Republic, The Atlantic, Salon, and The Boston Globe before joining The Daily Beast and later The Guardian. In the second half of 2019, he wrote for Jewish Insider. He is based in Washington, D.C.

=== Gianforte incident ===
On May 24, 2017, while covering Montana's at-large congressional district special election, 2017, Jacobs was physically assaulted by Republican candidate Greg Gianforte, following which Gianforte was cited by local law enforcement for misdemeanor assault. Jacobs was body-slammed by the candidate and his glasses were broken. A report in The Atlantic suggested that Jacobs' response to the body-slam, instead of fighting back, was to "get up and call out the situation for what it was ... asking for names of witnesses to the assault who will be assets to his case as it plays out in courts of law and public opinion", and that this showed a "judicious, prescient reaction" and an act of "redefining strength." A statement by the Republican candidate blamed Jacobs for causing the incident:

Tonight, as Greg was giving a separate interview in a private office, The Guardian's Ben Jacobs entered the office without permission, aggressively shoved a recorder in Greg's face, and began asking badgering questions. Jacobs was asked to leave. After asking Jacobs to lower the recorder, Jacobs declined. Greg then attempted to grab the phone that was pushed in his face. Jacobs grabbed Greg's wrist, and spun away from Greg, pushing them both to the ground. It's unfortunate that this aggressive behavior from a liberal journalist created this scene at our campaign volunteer BBQ.

— statement by spokesman Shane Scanlon

CNN analyst Gregory Krieg said that the act of describing Jacobs as a "liberal journalist" was being used as an "implicit excuse for the candidate's violent behavior." Professor Kathleen Jamieson sees the attack as part of a broader problem, caused in part by Donald Trump painting journalists as "the enemy of the American people," and in effect, inciting people such as Gianforte to violence.

He has experienced antisemitic harassment as a result of the incident. There is no indication, however, that Gianforte knew or cared that Jacobs was Jewish.

Gianforte won the special election on May 25. During Gianforte's acceptance speech that evening, he apologized to Jacobs and the Fox News crew for his assault. On June 7 Gianforte made a written apology to Jacobs and donated US$50,000 to the Committee to Protect Journalists, in return, Jacobs agreed to not pursue a civil claim against Gianforte.

On June 12, 2017, Gianforte pled guilty to the misdemeanor assault charge. He was sentenced to four days in jail, but the judge changed the sentence to 40 hours of community service, 20 hours of anger management and a $300 fine along with an $85 court fee.
