= Bill McChesney (politician) =

American politician

Member of the Montana House of Representatives from the 40th district
- In office January 3, 2007 – January 5, 2015
- Preceded by: Gary Matthews
- Succeeded by: Tom Berry

Personal details
- Born: October 3, 1948 (age 78) Missoula, Montana, U.S.
- Party: Democratic
- Spouse: Louise
- Education: University of Montana, Missoula

Bill McChesney (born October 3, 1948) is an American politician and member of the Democratic Party who was a member of the Montana House of Representatives, representing District 40, from 2007 to 2015. Term-limited in 2014, he ran for the 19th District of the Montana Senate but was defeated by Republican incumbent Frederick Moore. He ran for Governor of Montana in the 2016 election against Democratic incumbent Steve Bullock, but lost in the Democratic primary.
