= Greg Gianforte =

Governor of Montana since 2021

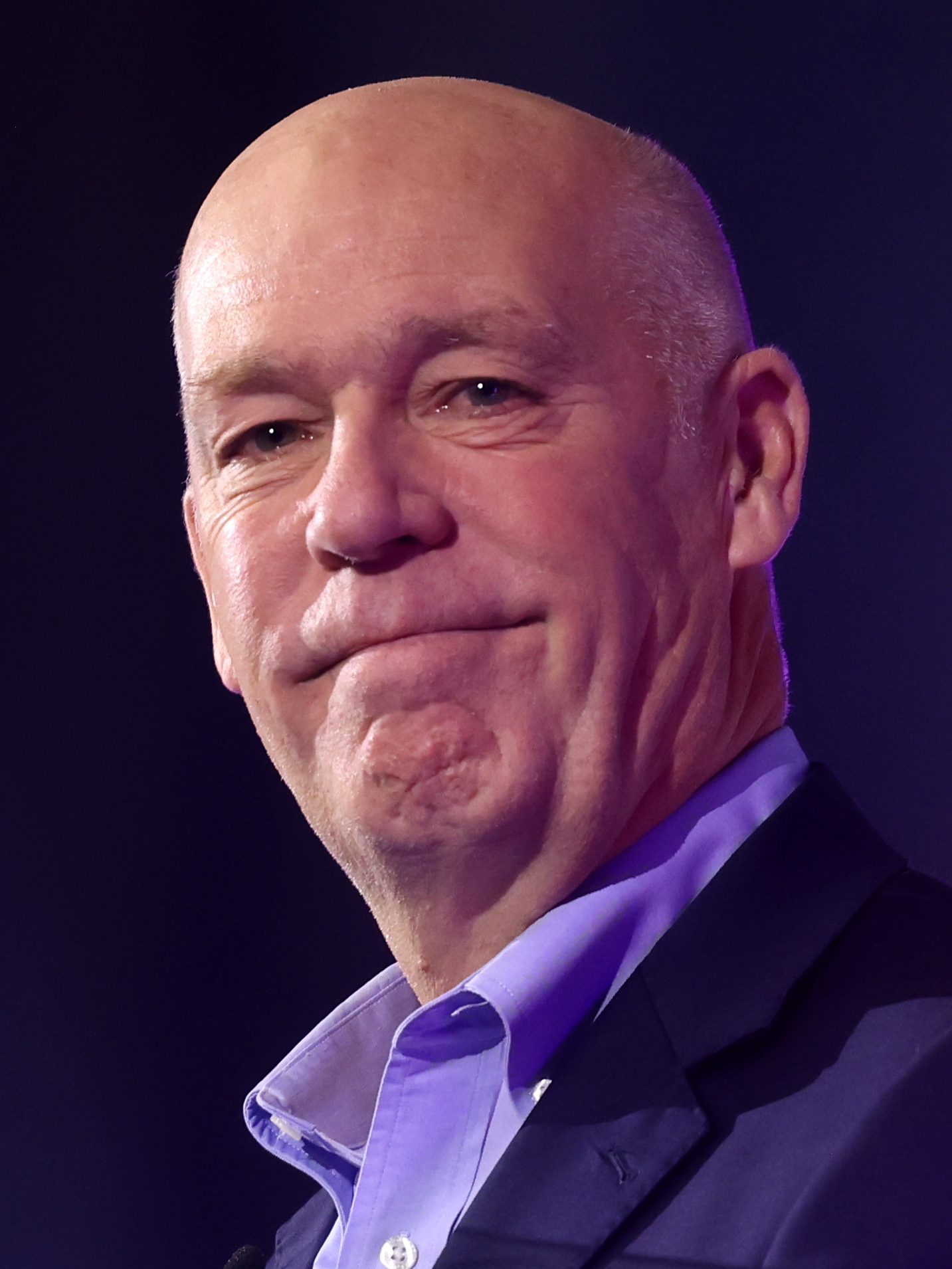
- Gianforte in 2025

25th Governor of Montana
- Incumbent
- Assumed office January 4, 2021
- Lieutenant: Kristen Juras
- Preceded by: Steve Bullock

Chair of the Republican Governors Association
- Incumbent
- Assumed office November 18, 2025
- Preceded by: Brian Kemp

Member of the U.S. House of Representatives from Montana's at-large district
- In office May 25, 2017 – January 3, 2021 (Note: Gianforte's official service begins on the date of the special election, while he was not sworn in until June 21, 2017.)
- Preceded by: Ryan Zinke
- Succeeded by: Matt Rosendale

Personal details
- Born: Gregory Richard Gianforte; April 17, 1961 (age 65) San Diego, California, U.S.
- Party: Republican
- Spouse: Susan Gianforte (m. 1988)
- Children: 4
- Education: Stevens Institute of Technology (BS, MS)
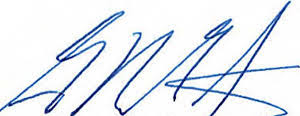
- Signature
- Website: Campaign website
- Gianforte's voice Gianforte supporting the Great American Outdoors Act. Recorded July 22, 2020

Gregory Richard Gianforte (/ˌdʒiːənˈfɔːrteɪ/ JEE-ən-FOR-tay; born April 17, 1961) is an American politician, businessman, and software engineer serving as the 25th governor of Montana since 2021. A member of the Republican Party, Gianforte served as the U.S. representative for Montana's at-large congressional district from 2017 to 2021.

In 1997, Gianforte and his wife, Susan, co-founded RightNow Technologies, a customer relationship management software company. The company went public in 2004; by that time, it employed over 1,000 workers. RightNow Technologies was acquired by Oracle Corporation for $1.5 billion in 2011.

Gianforte was the Republican nominee for governor of Montana in 2016, losing to incumbent governor Steve Bullock. In May 2017, he won a special election for Montana's at-large congressional seat after Ryan Zinke resigned to become U.S. Secretary of the Interior. Gianforte was convicted of misdemeanor assault in state court in June 2017 after assaulting The Guardian political reporter Ben Jacobs the day before the election. He was fined and sentenced to community service and anger management therapy. Gianforte was reelected in 2018.

Gianforte was elected governor of Montana in 2020, defeating Democratic nominee and incumbent lieutenant governor Mike Cooney. He is the first Republican to serve as governor of Montana since Judy Martz left office in 2005. He was reelected in 2024, becoming the first Republican to be elected governor of Montana twice since Marc Racicot in 1996.

== Early life and education ==
Gregory Richard Gianforte was born on April 17, 1961, in San Diego, California. He is the oldest son of Frank Richard Gianforte, who had a career as an aerospace engineer and, later, as a landlord. His mother, Dale Douglass, worked for General Dynamics in San Diego, and later was a school math teacher. He has two younger brothers, Douglass and Michael. After the age of three, Gianforte was raised in the Valley Forge and King of Prussia suburbs northwest of Philadelphia, Pennsylvania, including Wayne, an affluent unincorporated township community that extends into Montgomery, Chester, and Delaware Counties.

During his high school years in the 1970s, Gianforte started a software business. He attended Upper Merion Area High School in King of Prussia, Pennsylvania, where he was elected class president during his junior and senior years. Gianforte was also captain of his school football team, where he played left offensive guard. He graduated from high school in 1979.

Gianforte graduated in 1983 from his father's alma mater, Stevens Institute of Technology, with a BE in electrical engineering and a master's degree in computer science. He directed a computer lab with 12 programmers. He was a member of the Delta Tau Delta men's fraternity, and enjoyed playing squash.

== Career ==
=== Software entrepreneurship ===
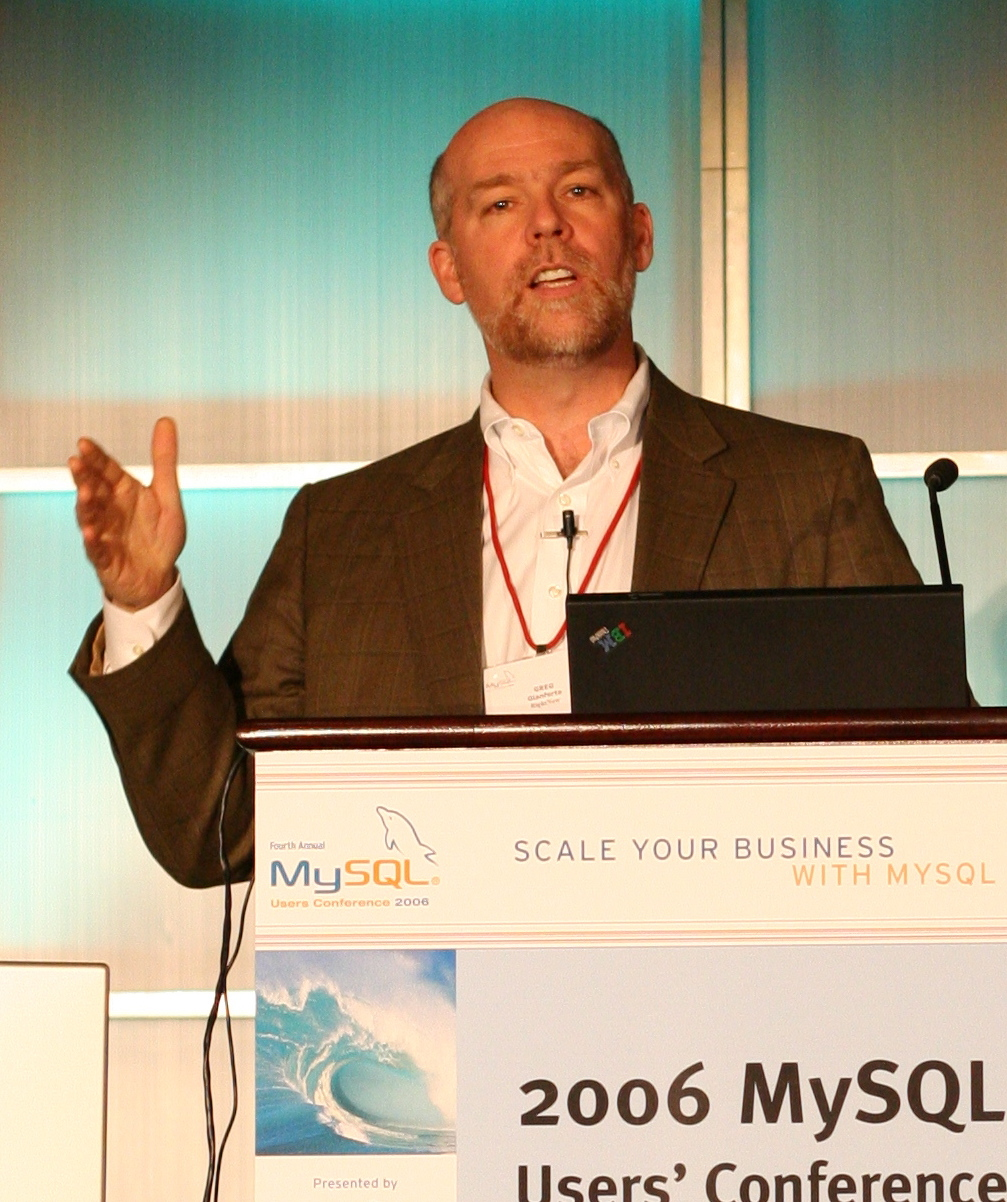
Gianforte speaking at a business conference in 2006

Gianforte began his career in 1983 at Bell Laboratories, working in product acquisition. Frustrated by the bureaucratic corporate hierarchy at Bell Labs, Gianforte departed to co-found Brightwork Development Inc., a developer of server-based LAN management software for the banking industry, which was based in Tinton Falls, New Jersey. He and his partners sold the company to McAfee Associates for $10 million in 1994. Gianforte then began working for McAfee as head of North American sales. In 1995, he moved to Bozeman, Montana.

Gianforte and his wife, Susan, a mechanical engineer by trade, co-founded RightNow Technologies in 1997. Part of Gianforte's strategy was to leverage the internet as a means to overcome geographic barriers to building a globalized business. By the time the company went public in 2004, it employed over 1,000 workers and executives in Bozeman and globally, with offices in the U.K., Asia, and Australia. Future U.S. senator Steve Daines was among its executives. The company was acquired by Oracle Corporation for $1.5 billion in 2011. At the time, Gianforte's 20% stake in the company was worth about $290 million. Right Now Technologies had contracts with federal agencies, including handling all of the online search queries for the Social Security Administration and Medicare websites. In 2012, Gianforte sued the Montana Democratic Party for defamation, alleging the House campaign ads it aired critical of then House candidate Daines were libelous. Gianforte alleged the party aired television ads that claimed that Right Now Technologies capitalized itself with public contracts, and then offshored jobs.

In 2005, Gianforte and Marcus Gibson co-wrote the book Bootstrapping Your Business: Start and Grow a Successful Company with Almost No Money. He has offered business lectures on entrepreneurship and building a global business.

=== Philanthropy and civic life ===
In 2004, Gianforte and his wife founded the Gianforte Family Foundation, which has promoted his creationist beliefs in the public sphere, and has made tens of millions of dollars in charitable contributions. The foundation describes its primary mission as supporting "the work of faith-based organizations engaged in outreach work, strengthening families, and helping the needy; organizations in Montana that work to improve education, support entrepreneurship, and create jobs; and organizations that enhance the local community of Bozeman, Montana." Gianforte, his wife, and his son, Richard, are the foundation's three trustees. The foundation had assets of $113 million in 2013.

The Gianforte Family Foundation has given nearly $900,000 to the Montana Family Foundation, in some years making up half of that organization's total revenue. The Montana Family Foundation has promoted conservative and Christian values in the Montana legislature. Asked why he donated to the group, Gianforte said it was because the organization aligns with his views.

Through his nonprofit, the Gianforte Family Charitable Trust, Gianforte has contributed substantial funds to several conservative organizations. Some have led legal efforts to dismantle federal campaign finance regulations. Gianforte has donated to the Family Research Council and Focus on the Family, which advocate for a constitutional amendment prohibiting same-sex marriage, as well as the Montana Family Foundation, which is "the state's primary advocate against LGBT policies". Gianforte served on the board of the Friedman Foundation for Educational Choice, an education reform organization founded by economist Milton Friedman which advocates for school vouchers.

Gianforte believes in Young Earth creationism. He has donated at least $290,000 to the Glendive Dinosaur and Fossil Museum, a Montana creationist museum that teaches visitors that the theory of evolution is false, that the Earth is about 6,000–6,400 years old, and that humans and dinosaurs coexisted during the same period. The museum claims dinosaurs were aboard Noah's Ark, and that they likely went extinct 4,300 years ago during the great flood described in the Book of Genesis. The Gianforte Family Foundation also donated a Tyrannosaurus rex skeleton replica to the museum.

=== Affiliations and investments ===
Gianforte has had a variety of business interests and investments. In November 2013, he was appointed to the board of FICO, which profiles consumer credit risks for lenders. The same month, Gianforte acquired 8,000 shares of FICO, which were then valued at more than $464,000.00. He is a partner in MGRR No. 1, a limited liability company that has received grain subsidies since 1995. Gianforte was the founding board chair of the Montana High Tech Business Alliance. He resigned as chair in June 2017, when he was sworn into Congress.

In financial disclosure forms filed in 2017, Gianforte indicated that he owned $150,000 worth of shares in VanEck Vectors Russia ETF and $92,400 in the IShares MSCF Russia ETF, totaling just under $250,000 in two exchange-traded funds focused on investments in Russia. The investments attracted attention because they included shares in Gazprom and Rosneft, which have been subject to U.S. sanctions since the Russian invasion of Crimea, but because the per-person ownership stake in these companies is so small in such index funds, they are exempt from sanctions. After the issue was raised in Gianforte's 2017 congressional campaign, Gianforte stated that his Russia holdings were a small portion of his overall investments and pledged to place all of his assets in a blind trust if elected.

Through a holding corporation, Gianforte owns a 12-seat private jet, which he has used as a strategic asset on the campaign trail. He made the aircraft available to others in his congressional caucus to travel back to Washington for important votes.

== U.S. House of Representatives (2017–2021) ==
=== Elections ===
==== 2017 special election campaign ====
Map graphic representing the 49.7% of votes Gianforte received (in red) during the 2017 special election

On March 1, 2017, Republican Representative Ryan Zinke of Montana's at-large congressional district resigned his seat after the United States Senate confirmed him as United States Secretary of the Interior. A special election was scheduled to fill the remainder of Zinke's term. Gianforte had already announced his intention to seek the seat on January 25, before Zinke's resignation. At a March 6 convention, the Republican Party nominated Gianforte. He faced Democratic musician and former Montana Arts Council member Rob Quist and Libertarian nominee Mark Wicks in the general election.

In a departure from previous pledges made during his gubernatorial campaign, Gianforte relaxed his past pledges to refuse all PAC money, and began to turn away only corporate PAC funding. His campaign began accepting contributions from political party and leadership PACs.

Gianforte distanced himself from Donald Trump during the 2016 Republican presidential primary and did not attend Trump's sole rally in Montana, citing a scheduling conflict. But he endorsed Trump in the 2016 general election and continued to express support for him during his 2017 special election campaign for Congress. Gianforte's campaign was supported by Vice President Mike Pence and Donald Trump Jr., who both stumped for Gianforte in the state. Gianforte tacked close to Trump's political narratives, promoting his outsider status as a first time political candidate, touting his experience as a technology entrepreneur, and criticizing policies leading to sanctuary cities and "the liberal elite."

Gianforte supported repeal of the Affordable Care Act (Obamacare). He declined to say whether he supported the American Health Care Act, the House Republican legislation to repeal and replace the Affordable Care Act. On May 4, 2017, Gianforte held a private conference call with Republican-leaning lobbyists in Washington in which he offered a more supportive view of the AHCA. He said that it "sounds like we just passed a health care thing, which I'm thankful for. Sounds like we're starting to repeal and replace." Later that May, he said he would not "vote for a repeal and a replace unless I know it protects people with preexisting conditions, lowers rates and preserves rural access". Gianforte assaulted a reporter in response to questions about how the AHCA would make health insurance too expensive for people with preexisting conditions.

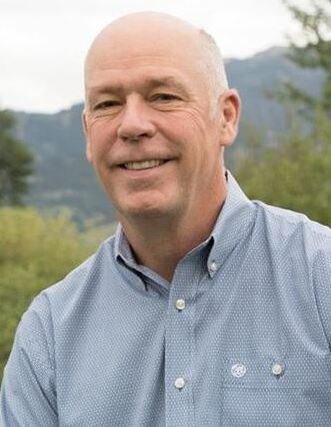
Gianforte circa June 2017 when he was sworn into office.

Gianforte opposed the legalization of marijuana for recreational use, comparing marijuana to more addictive drugs. He supported allowing the use of medical marijuana for "people in chronic pain, under the care of a doctor."

Gianforte opposes abortion except in cases where a woman's life is in danger. He favors removing federal funding from Planned Parenthood. He has said that he supports government enforcement of nondiscrimination for workers, but not for customers. He opposed increasing the minimum wage. Gianforte supported Executive Order 13769, to ban immigration from seven Muslim-majority countries. He opposed resettlement of refugees in Montana. He opposed sanctuary cities policies. Gianforte blamed the Obama administration for "the situation with Russia" and favored a multilateral strategy to stand against Russian aggression. He supported Trump's decision to fire FBI Director James Comey.

Gianforte opposed efforts to transfer federal lands to the states. He called for changes to the Endangered Species Act. He supported amending the Equal Access to Justice Act to reduce environmental litigation, saying that "environmental extremists" had abused the act. He acknowledged human-caused climate change but "did not have specific ideas on how to address climate change". He has said that "the climate is always changing" and believes that closing coal-fired power plants would not help mitigate climate change. He supported Trump's repeal of the Clean Power Plan and has called for investments in clean coal technology. Gianforte has criticized the length of time the Department of Interior spends to evaluate applications to drill and frack for shale gas.

Gianforte outlined his position on retirement by using the Biblical example of Noah. He said:

There's nothing in the Bible that talks about retirement. And yet it's been an accepted concept in our culture today. Nowhere does it say, "Well, he was a good and faithful servant, so he went to the beach". The example I think of is Noah. How old was Noah when he built the ark? 600. He wasn't, like, cashing Social Security checks. He wasn't hanging out. He was working. So I think we have an obligation to work. The role we have in work may change over time, but the concept of retirement is not biblical.

==== Election-eve assault on journalist ====
On May 24, 2017, the day before the House special election, Ben Jacobs, a political reporter for The Guardian newspaper who was covering the election, reported to the Gallatin County Sheriff's Office that Gianforte had assaulted him at Gianforte's Bozeman campaign office after Jacobs asked him a question about health care policy. Jacobs said that Gianforte "bodyslammed" him to the floor and broke his glasses. Jacobs was hospitalized after the attack.

In the immediate aftermath of the incident, Gianforte made misleading statements to a Gallatin County Sheriff's Office sergeant who reported to Gianforte's campaign office to investigate Jacobs's complaint. Gianforte told the sergeant, "the liberal media is trying to make a story." In the hours after the assault, the Gianforte campaign issued a press release falsely blaming the reporter, claiming that Jacobs grabbed Gianforte's wrist and caused them both to fall to the ground. But an audio recording of the incident appeared to support Jacobs's statement, and other reporters who were present at the scene corroborated Jacobs's version of events. An eyewitness to the attack, Fox News reporter Alicia Acuna, testified that "Gianforte grabbed Jacobs by the neck with both hands and slammed him into the ground", then "began punching the man" and "yelling something to the effect of 'I'm sick and tired of this!'" Acuna said, "at no point did any of us who witnessed this assault see Jacobs show any form of physical aggression toward Gianforte, who left the area after giving statements to local sheriff's deputies." Another journalist who was an eyewitness to the assault, Alexis Levinson, tweeted that she "heard a giant crash and saw Ben's feet fly in the air as he hit the floor."

The Gallatin County Sheriff's Office cited Gianforte for misdemeanor assault. On August 25, 2017, he was briefly booked into jail, fingerprinted, and had his mugshot taken, after his legal team lost a bid to avoid that process. On October 10, 2017, Gianforte's mugshot was released publicly by a Gallatin County court order.

The Helena Independent Record editorial board rescinded its endorsement of Gianforte and noted that before the attack, Gianforte had encouraged his supporters to boycott certain newspapers, singled out a reporter in a room to point out that he was outnumbered, and joked about choking a news writer. Two other well-circulated Montana newspapers, the Billings Gazette, and the largest in the state, the Missoulian, also rescinded their endorsements of Gianforte. Speaker Paul Ryan and other members of Congress urged Gianforte to apologize.

In his acceptance speech the night of his May 25 victory, Gianforte apologized to Jacobs and the Fox News crew for his assault. On June 7, he made a written apology to Jacobs and donated $50,000 to the Committee to Protect Journalists, which accepted the funds because it was part of the settlement and said it would put them towards the U.S. Press Freedom Tracker. In return, Jacobs agreed to not pursue a civil claim against Gianforte.

Gianforte subsequently pleaded guilty to misdemeanor assault in Gallatin County District Court, acknowledging that Jacobs "did not initiate any physical contact with me" and writing a letter to Jacobs saying that Jacobs did not start the physical altercation. Gianforte was originally sentenced to four days in jail, to be completed in part through a work program, but he was ineligible for the work program due to the assault conviction. The judge then switched the sentence to 40 hours of community service, 20 hours of anger management therapy, a 180-day deferred sentence, and a $300 fine along with an $85 court fee.

During the court hearing, Jacobs said that he hoped to interview Gianforte in the future, as he was trying to do at the time of the assault. Gianforte said in court to Jacobs, "I am sorry, and if and when you are ready, I look forward to sitting down with you in D.C." As of October 2017, Gianforte had not sat down with Jacobs for an interview, and the issue was not pursued further.

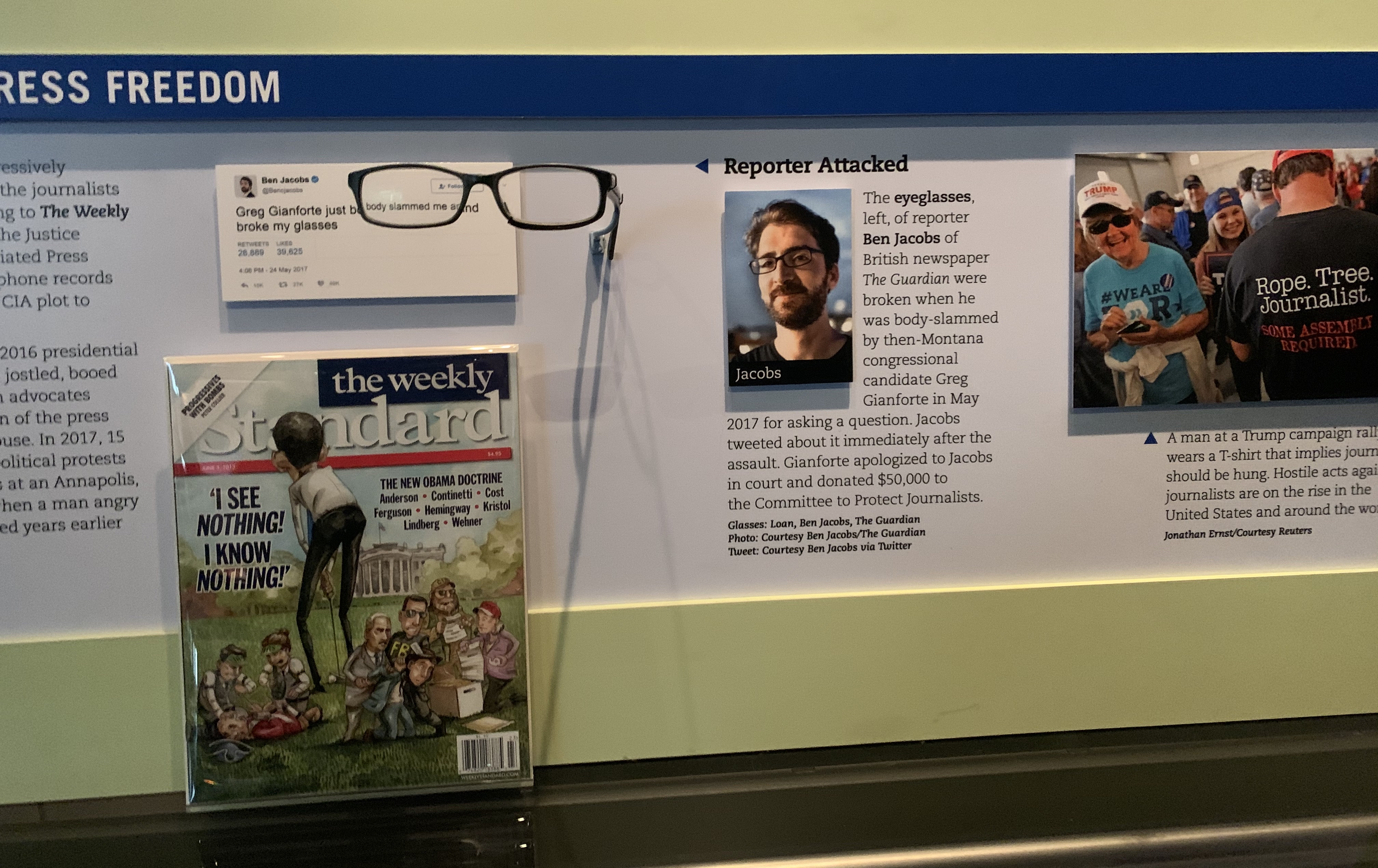
Exhibit on Greg Gianforte's election eve assault of The Guardian reporter Ben Jacobs at The Newseum, a now closed museum of the news media in Washington, D.C.

Since the assault, Jacobs has, through his attorney, accused Gianforte of whitewashing his guilt, twice sending Gianforte cease-and-desist letters about his accounts of his culpability in the assault. Gianforte met with the Missoulian newspaper editorial board in October 2018, and, when asked about the assault, maintained that his original false statement to sheriff's deputies in the immediate aftermath of the incident was his best recollection of events, a statement that Gianforte later contradicted under oath in court with an admission of guilt connected to his guilty plea.

On October 18, 2018, during a rally in Missoula, Montana, President Donald Trump congratulated Gianforte for his assault on Jacobs. While verbally praising Gianforte's prowess in carrying out a body slam, Trump made gestures with his hands and arms to pantomime a fighting maneuver. According to The Guardian, this marked the first time a sitting president had "openly and directly praised a violent act against a journalist on American soil".

Gianforte's assault of Jacobs achieved political notoriety. During an October 2018 campaign event with then Georgia Secretary of State Brian Kemp, Representative Jody Hice implored the small crowd that had gathered to oppose the resurgence of Democratic candidates in the 2018 midterm elections. Hice declared, "It's time for this so called blue wave to be body-slammed!"

==== 2018 House campaign ====
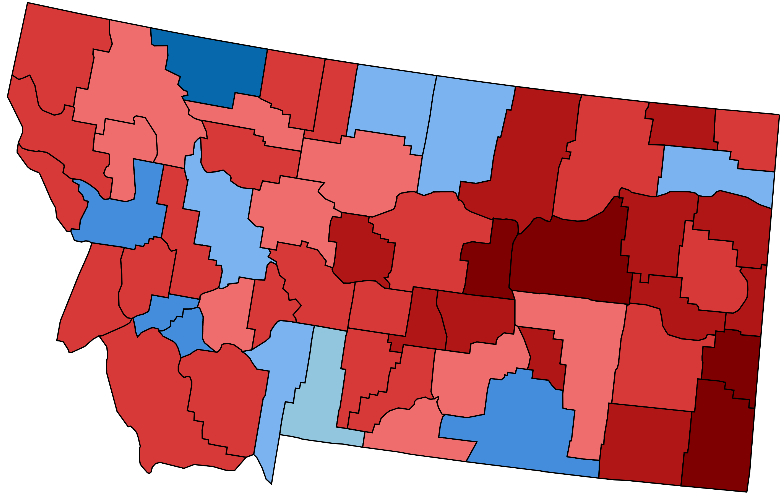
Map graphic representing the 51% of votes Gianforte received (in red) during the 2018 election

In 2018, Gianforte ran against Democratic nominee Kathleen Williams, a state legislator and natural resources expert from Bozeman, and Libertarian Party candidate Elinor Swanson, a lawyer from Billings.

Gianforte opposed Williams's proposal to allow those 55 and older to buy into Medicare, remarking, "Medicare for all is Medicare for none", and cautioned that Medicare would be at risk of spending cuts if Democrats won a majority in the House. Williams criticized Gianforte for introducing a bill to remove federal protections from several wilderness study areas in Montana without holding any public meetings on the issue.

Polling data in the weeks leading up to the election showed Gianforte and Williams in a close contest within the margin of error. Gianforte was reelected, 51% to 46%. Exit polling data indicated that his strongest support at the polls was from men older than 44 and from those with annual incomes above $50,000.

=== Tenure ===
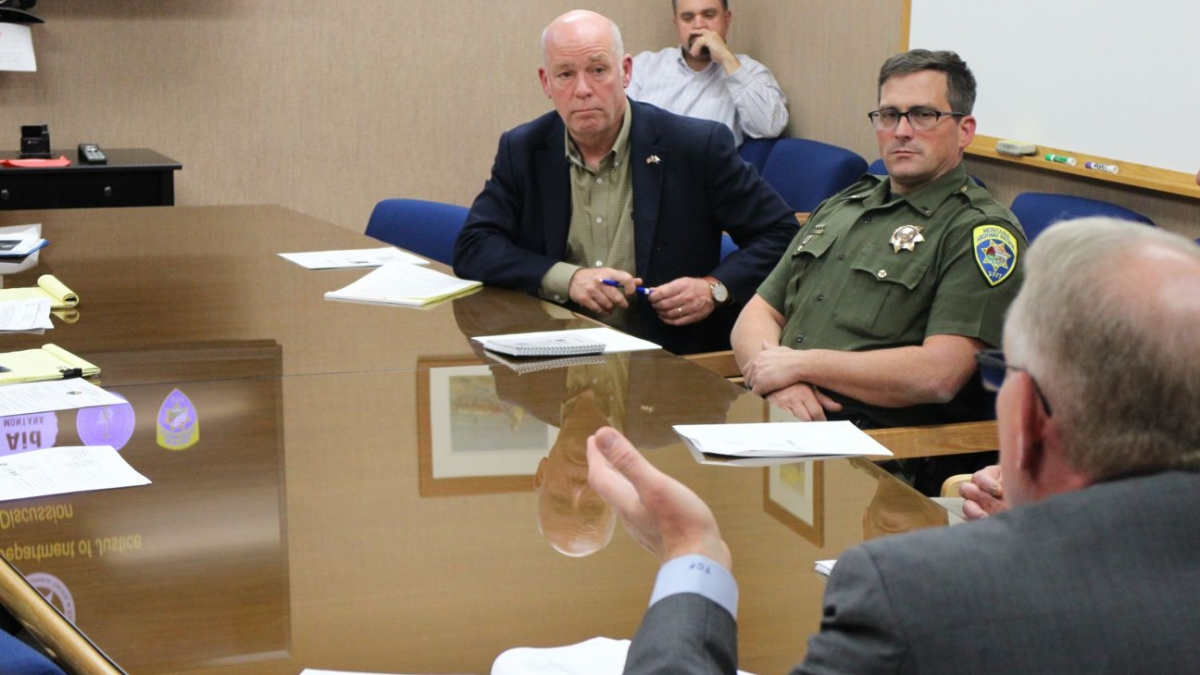
Gianforte discusses illegal drug interdiction in October 2018 with the Montana Highway Patrol, the Montana Department of Justice, and Montana Attorney General Tim Fox.

==== 115th Congress ====
Gianforte was sworn into the House of Representatives on June 21, 2017. At his inauguration ceremony, he announced his support for congressional term limits, barring members of Congress from becoming lobbyists, and withholding congressional pay if no budget is passed. It is unusual for members of Congress to announce such support for legislation in their inauguration. Montana Democrats mailed Gianforte an orange prison jumpsuit on the day of his inauguration.

The first bill Gianforte introduced, on June 21, 2017, was H.R. 2977, the Balanced Budget Accountability Act, which, as he summarized it, would withhold pay from members of Congress unless a balanced budget is passed. The bill did not achieve a committee hearing.

Gianforte touted refundable tax credits for low income parents as an achievement of the Republican Caucus in the 115th Congress.

In 2018, Gianforte expressed opposition to the aluminum and steel tariffs imposed by President Trump, expressing fears about the impact of retaliatory tariffs (the trade war) on Montana agricultural exports.

Gianforte chaired the Interior Subcommittee of the Oversight Committee through the end of the 115th Congress in 2018. He introduced legislation to nullify Wilderness Study Area (WSA) designations from more than 800,000 acres of land in Montana under the stewardship of the federal Bureau of Land Management and the U.S. Forest Service.

==== 116th Congress ====
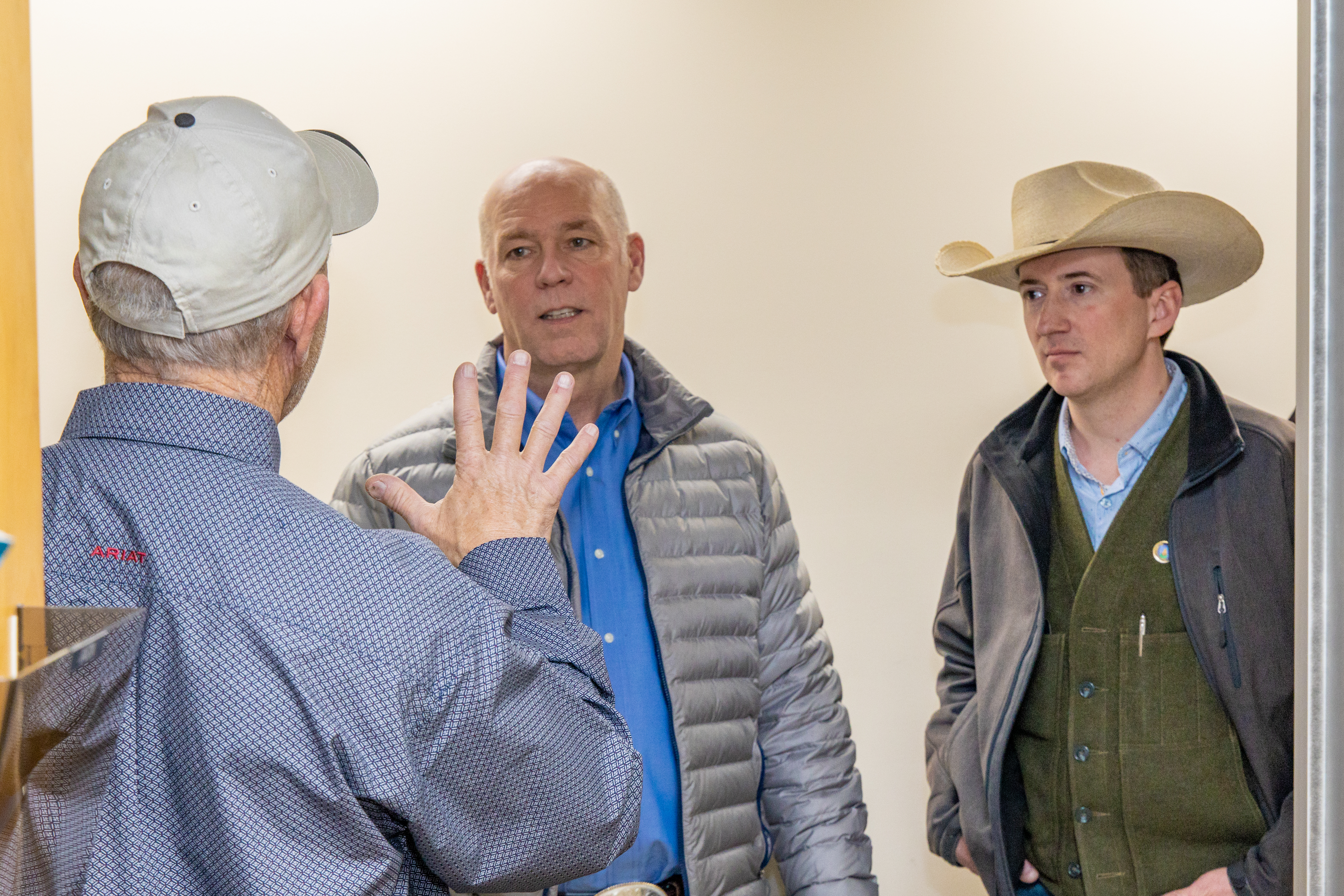
Gianforte in 2020.

In the 2018 midterm elections, the Republicans lost control of the House to the Democrats, and Gianforte began his second term in January 2019 in the minority caucus. Over his career, Gianforte voted in line with Trump's position in about 93.3% of key votes. A local newspaper reported that Gianforte had voted with Trump's position on what it described as "key votes" more often than had Montana U.S. Senator Steve Daines, a fellow Republican.

In January 2019, during the 2018–2019 United States federal government shutdown, Gianforte said that he "didn't come here to Washington to shut the government down" but expressed support for Trump and blamed Speaker of the House Nancy Pelosi for the shutdown. He opposed the impeachment inquiry against Donald Trump over the Trump-Ukraine scandal, calling it a "sham", and voted against both articles of impeachment against Trump (abuse of power and obstruction of Congress). Gianforte voted against a measure to bar Trump from initiating military action against Iran without congressional consent; a spokesman for Gianforte said in 2019 that he would not "discuss the conditions under which he would vote in favor of authorizing military force against Iran because talking about it strengthens the position [of] Iran's regime." Gianforte voted against the 2020 House Democrats police reform bill; against restoring part of the Voting Rights Act; against universal background checks for gun purchases; and against the 2020 D.C. statehood bill. In line with Trump's position, he voted against legislation to block U.S. arms sales to Saudi Arabia and the United Arab Emirates, but he opposed Trump's decision in 2019 to withdraw U.S. forces from northern Syria, where they had been stationed as part of U.S. efforts to block Turkish attacks on Kurdish forces. Gianforte voted against legislation in 2019 to raise the federal minimum wage to $15 per hour. He voted against legislation to overturn Trump's emergency declaration to divert federal appropriations for construction of a border wall. He opposed federal action to combat climate change and supported Trump's withdrawal of the U.S. from the Paris Agreement on climate change, voting against legislation to block Trump from withdrawing from the agreement. Gianforte voted against reauthorizing the Export–Import Bank and against a bill allowing the government to negotiate lower prices for prescription drugs. He voted for the United States–Mexico–Canada Agreement on trade.

Gianforte is one of the few tech executives to be elected to political office in the U.S. After Representative Darrell Issa left office in 2019, Gianforte became the wealthiest member of Congress, a distinction he held until the January 2020 appointment of Kelly Loeffler to represent Georgia in the Senate.

In December 2020, Gianforte was one of 126 Republican members of the House of Representatives to sign an amicus brief in support of Texas v. Pennsylvania, a lawsuit filed at the United States Supreme Court contesting the results of the 2020 presidential election, in which Joe Biden defeated Trump. The Supreme Court declined to hear the case on the basis that Texas lacked standing under Article III of the Constitution to challenge the results of an election held by another state.

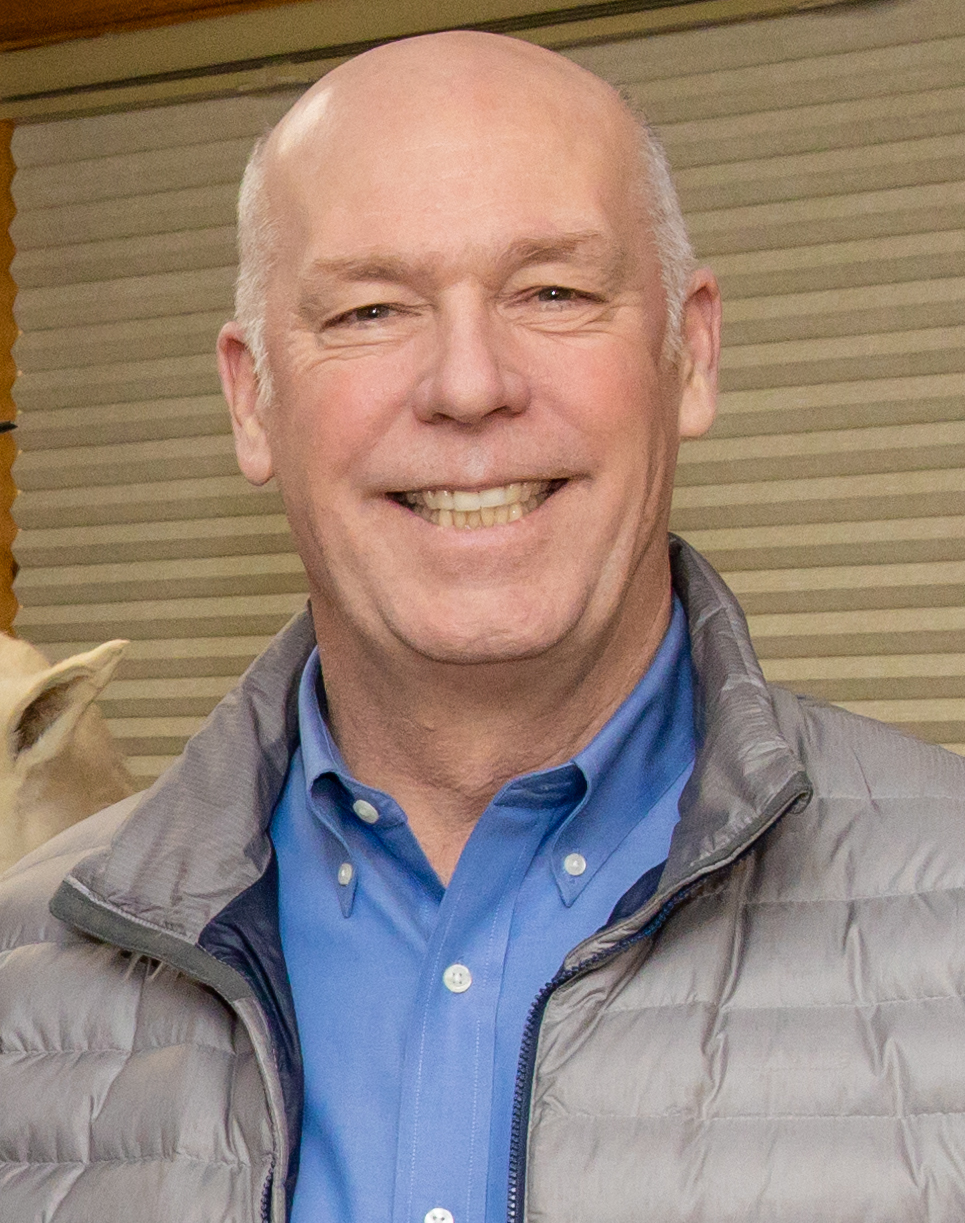
Gianforte in 2020.

House Speaker Nancy Pelosi issued a statement that called signing the amicus brief an act of "election subversion". She also reprimanded Gianforte and the other House members who supported the lawsuit: "The 126 Republican Members that signed onto this lawsuit brought dishonor to the House. Instead of upholding their oath to support and defend the Constitution, they chose to subvert the Constitution and undermine public trust in our sacred democratic institutions."

Committee assignments

- Natural Resources Committee
  - Subcommittee on Federal Lands
  - Subcommittee on Water, Power, and Oceans
- Oversight Committee
  - Subcommittee on Information Technology
  - Subcommittee on Interior (Chair, 115th Congress)
  - Subcommittee on Intergovernmental Affairs

Caucus memberships

- Congressional Western Caucus

== 2016 Gubernatorial Attempt ==
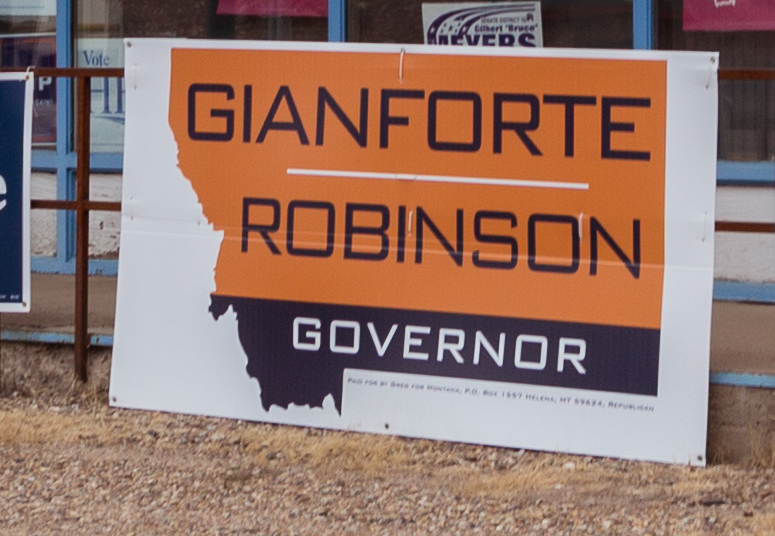
Gianforte/Robinson campaign sign outside the Hill County Republican Party headquarters in Havre

On January 20, 2016, Gianforte announced his candidacy for the Republican Party's nomination for governor of Montana in the 2016 election. A citizen of Butte filed a political practices complaint against him, alleging that he began campaigning before registering; the complaint was dismissed.

In a campaign speech that year, Gianforte stated that he had been involved in discussions with Facebook about bringing a new call center to Montana, but that Facebook had declined because of that state's business equipment tax. A Facebook spokesman disputed Gianforte's claims, saying that no discussions with him had taken place and that the tax was not the reason the company decided not to locate a call center in Montana. Gianforte stood by his statement, saying he had spoken with a Facebook executive the previous fall.

During his gubernatorial campaign, Gianforte pledged not to accept special interest PAC money and ran television ads criticizing his opponent for doing so. He came under scrutiny when an audio tape surfaced revealing his past advocacy to replace state income tax and state business tax revenue with a state sales tax.

Management of public lands was a point of contention in Gianforte's 2016 campaign for governor. In 2009, Gianforte's LLC filed a lawsuit against the Montana Department of Fish, Wildlife and Parks about the boundaries of an easement for public access to the East Gallatin River adjacent to his property. Gianforte's suit against the state became an issue in the 2016 campaign, with his critics characterizing it as a wealthy out-of-stater's effort to block public access to a popular stream. Gianforte consistently denied the allegations and called the issue a misunderstanding, noting the suit was never served, though the lawsuit was settled outside of court.

Gianforte opposes same-sex marriage and abortion.

Incumbent governor Steve Bullock defeated Gianforte in the November general election, 50% to 46%.

== Governor of Montana ==
=== Tenure ===
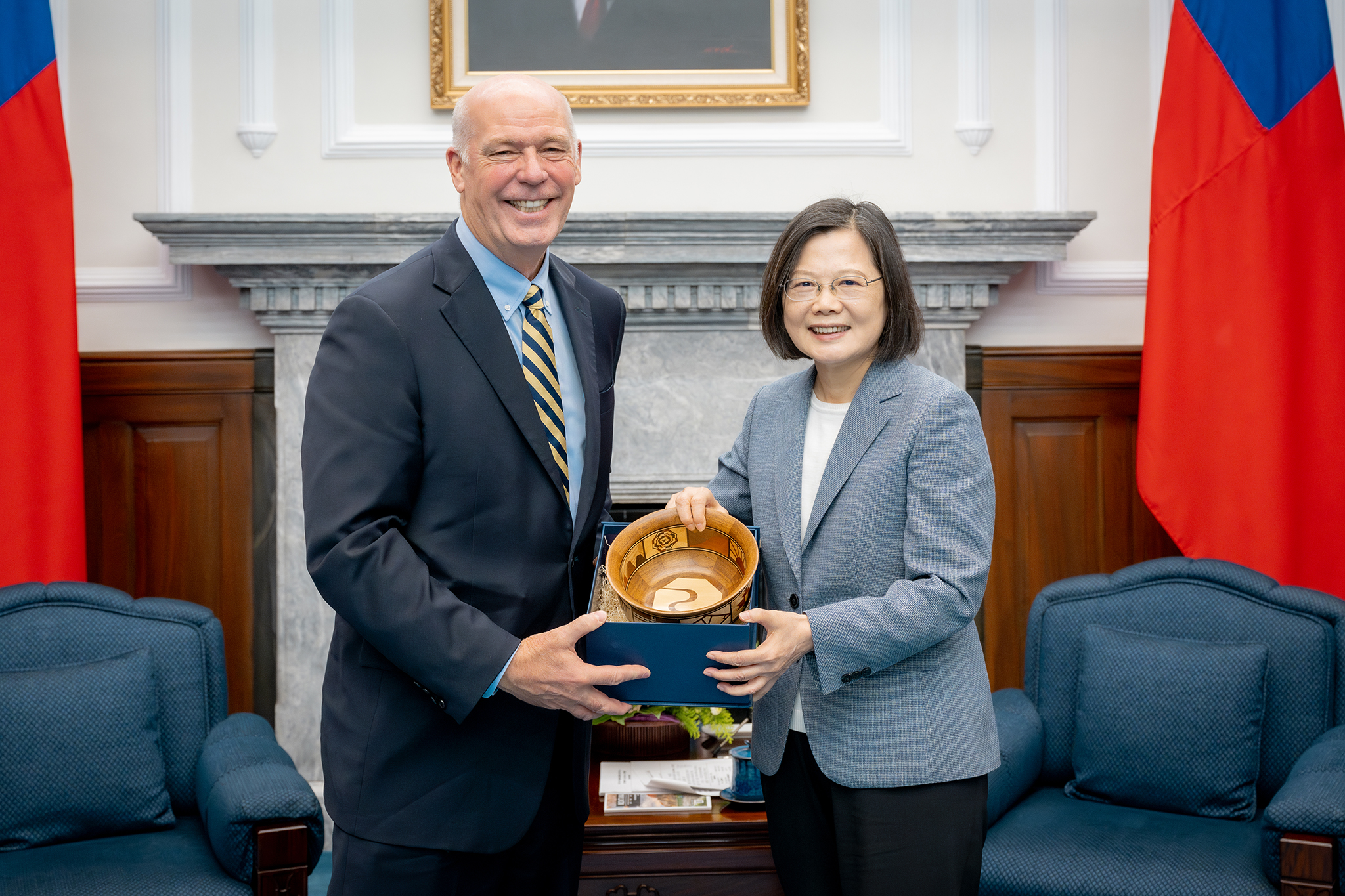
Gianforte meeting with Tsai Ing-wen in Taiwan

Gianforte was sworn in as governor on January 4, 2021.

On February 12, 2021, during the COVID-19 pandemic, Gianforte lifted Montana's statewide mask mandate. The previous day, he signed a bill giving businesses and healthcare providers liability protections. In May 2021, Gianforte signed a bill into law that limited the ability of hospitals and other businesses to require that their staff be vaccinated against COVID-19 and prohibited businesses from requiring that customers be vaccinated in order to access facilities. Montana became the only state with such a ban on employers.

On February 18, 2021, Gianforte signed a constitutional carry bill into law.

On March 16, 2021, Gianforte signed a bill changing Montana's system of choosing judges, giving the governor, with the state senate's approval, more control over the process.

On April 2, 2021, Gianforte signed a bill banning sanctuary cities in Montana; at the time, there were no sanctuary cities in Montana. Montana became the 13th state to ban sanctuary cities.

Later that April, Gianforte signed a bill into law that ended same-day voter registration in Montana, in addition to a separate bill that prevented students from using a student ID as voter ID. He also signed a bill making it easier for individuals to challenge government regulations for violating their religious beliefs, and signed three bills restricting abortion.

On April 30, 2021, Gianforte signed a bill requiring individuals to undergo gender reassignment surgery in order to change their birth certificate. On May 7, 2021, he signed a bill banning transgender athletes from girls' sports in public schools. On April 28, 2023, he signed a bill banning gender-affirming care for transgender minors.

=== Elections ===
==== 2020 ====
On June 6, 2019, Gianforte contended with Attorney General Tim Fox and State Senator Al Olszewski for the Republican nomination in the 2020 Montana gubernatorial election. Gianforte drew parallels between his experience building a large technology company in Bozeman and Trump's business background, and shared anecdotes of visits to the White House meant to illustrate their ties.

Gianforte won the Republican nomination, receiving a majority of the votes cast in the three-way election. In the November general election, he defeated incumbent lieutenant governor Mike Cooney.

==== 2024 ====
On January 16, 2024, Gianforte announced that he was seeking reelection to a second term. He defeated Tanner Smith in the Republican primary with over 75% of the vote. Gianforte once again selected Lieutenant Governor Kristen Juras as his running mate. He defeated Democratic nominee Ryan Busse in the 2024 Montana gubernatorial election.

== Personal life ==
While working at Bell Labs in New Jersey in the 1980s, Gianforte met his wife, Susan, the first-generation daughter of German immigrants. They married in 1988. Gianforte and his wife have resided in Bozeman since moving from New Jersey in 1995. They have four children. Gianforte was raised Presbyterian. He and his wife attend Grace Bible Church, a nondenominational church in Bozeman.

Gianforte is an avid hunter. In a 2016 interview, he described entertaining investment bankers from Scotland and New York at his Montana home, in connection with his company's public stock offering, where he served them a dinner of mountain lion teriyaki, antelope chops wrapped in bacon, and elk tenderloin. On October 28, 2000, he was fined $70 for violating state Fish and Wildlife Commission rules by killing an elk. In February 2021, he violated state hunting regulations by trapping and shooting an adult black wolf known as "1155". While born in Yellowstone National Park and radio collared in 2018, it was roughly 10 miles (16 km) north of the park's boundary. As Gianforte had not completed a wolf trapping certification course, he was issued a written warning by Fish, Wildlife and Parks. In December, he killed a mountain lion near the same area that was also being monitored by the National Park Service. "M220" was radio collared in 2019 and was estimated to be five years old when he was driven up a tree by the hunting group's dogs and shot in compliance with Montana state laws.

Gianforte received an honorary doctorate from Stevens Institute of Technology and gave the commencement speech in 2012. In 2007, he received an honorary doctorate from Montana State University's College of Engineering. In 2007, Gianforte was inducted into the CRM Hall of Fame. He received the 2003 Stevens Institute of Technology's Stevens Honor Award. Gianforte was named Pacific Northwest Entrepreneur of the Year by Ernst & Young in 2003.

As of 2018, Gianforte's net worth was more than $189 million, which made him one of Congress's wealthiest members.

== Electoral history ==
2016 Montana gubernatorial Republican primary
Party	Candidate	Votes	%
Republican	Greg Gianforte	111,348	76.29%
Republican	Terry Nelson	34,600	23.71%
Total votes		145,948	100.00%

2016 Montana gubernatorial election
Party	Candidate	Votes	%	±%
Democratic	Steve Bullock (incumbent); Mike Cooney (incumbent)	255,933	50.25%	+1.35%
Republican	Greg Gianforte	236,115	46.36%	−0.98%
Libertarian	Ted Dunlap	17,312	3.39%	−0.37%
Total votes		509,360	100.00%	

2017 Montana's at-large congressional district special election
Party	Candidate	Votes	%	±%
Republican	Greg Gianforte	190,520	49.70%	−6.49%
Democratic	Rob Quist	169,214	44.14%	+3.59%
Libertarian	Mark L. Wicks	21,682	5.66%	+2.40%
Independent	Doug Campbell (write-in)	81	0.02%	+0.02%
Total votes		383,382	100.00%	

2018 United States House of Representatives Republican primary
Party	Candidate	Votes	%
Republican	Greg Gianforte (incumbent)	135,225	100
Total votes		135,225	100

2018 United States House of Representatives election in Montana
Party	Candidate	Votes	%	±%
Republican	Greg Gianforte (incumbent)	256,661	50.88%	+0.93%
Democratic	Kathleen Williams	233,284	46.25%	+1.88%
Libertarian	Elinor Swanson	14,476	2.87%	−2.81%
Total votes		504,421	100.00%	

2020 Montana gubernatorial Republican primary
Party	Candidate	Votes	%
Republican	Greg Gianforte	119,247	53.44%
Republican	Tim Fox	60,823	27.26%
Republican	Albert Olszewski	43,080	19.30%
Total votes		223,150	100.00%

2020 Montana gubernatorial election
Party	Candidate	Votes	%	±%
Republican	Greg Gianforte; Kristen Juras	328,548	54.43%	+8.08%
Democratic	Mike Cooney	250,860	41.56%	−8.69%
Libertarian	Lyman Bishop	24,179	4.01%	+0.61%
Total votes		603,587	100.00%	

2024 Montana gubernatorial Republican primary
Party	Candidate	Votes	%
Republican	Greg Gianforte	144,752	75.2%
Republican	Tanner Smith	47,889	24.8%
Total votes		192,499	100.00%

2024 Montana gubernatorial election
Party	Candidate	Votes	%	±%
Republican	Greg Gianforte (incumbent); Kristen Juras (incumbent)	354,569	58.86%	+4.43%
Democratic	Ryan Busse; Raph Graybill	232,644	38.62%	−2.94%
Libertarian	Kaiser Leib; Matt Campbell	15,191	2.52%	−1.49%
Total votes		602,404	100.00%	N/A

== Books ==
- Gianforte, Greg; and Gibson, Marcus (2005). Bootstrapping your business: start and grow a successful company with almost no money. Adams Media.
- Gianforte, Greg (2008). Eight to great : eight steps to delivering an exceptional customer experience. self-published.
- Gianforte, Greg (2012). Attack of the customers : why critics assault brands online and how to avoid becoming a victim. self-published.

Party political offices
Preceded by Rick Hill	Republican nominee for Governor of Montana; 2016, 2020, 2024	Most recent
Preceded by Bill Lee	Chair of the Republican Governors Association; 2024–present	Incumbent
U.S. House of Representatives
Preceded by Ryan Zinke	Member of the U.S. House of Representatives from Montana's at-large congressional district 2017–2021	Succeeded by Matt Rosendale
Political offices
Preceded by Steve Bullock	Governor of Montana; 2021–present	Incumbent
Preceded by JD Vance as Vice President	Order of precedence of the United States; Within Montana	Succeeded by Mayor of city in which event is held
Preceded by JD Vance as Vice President	Order of precedence of the United States; Within Montana	Succeeded by Otherwise Mike Johnson as Speaker of the House
Preceded by Larry Rhoden as Governor of South Dakota	Order of precedence of the United States; Outside Montana	Succeeded by Bob Ferguson as Governor of Washington
