= Tim Fox (politician) =

American lawyer and politician (born 1957)

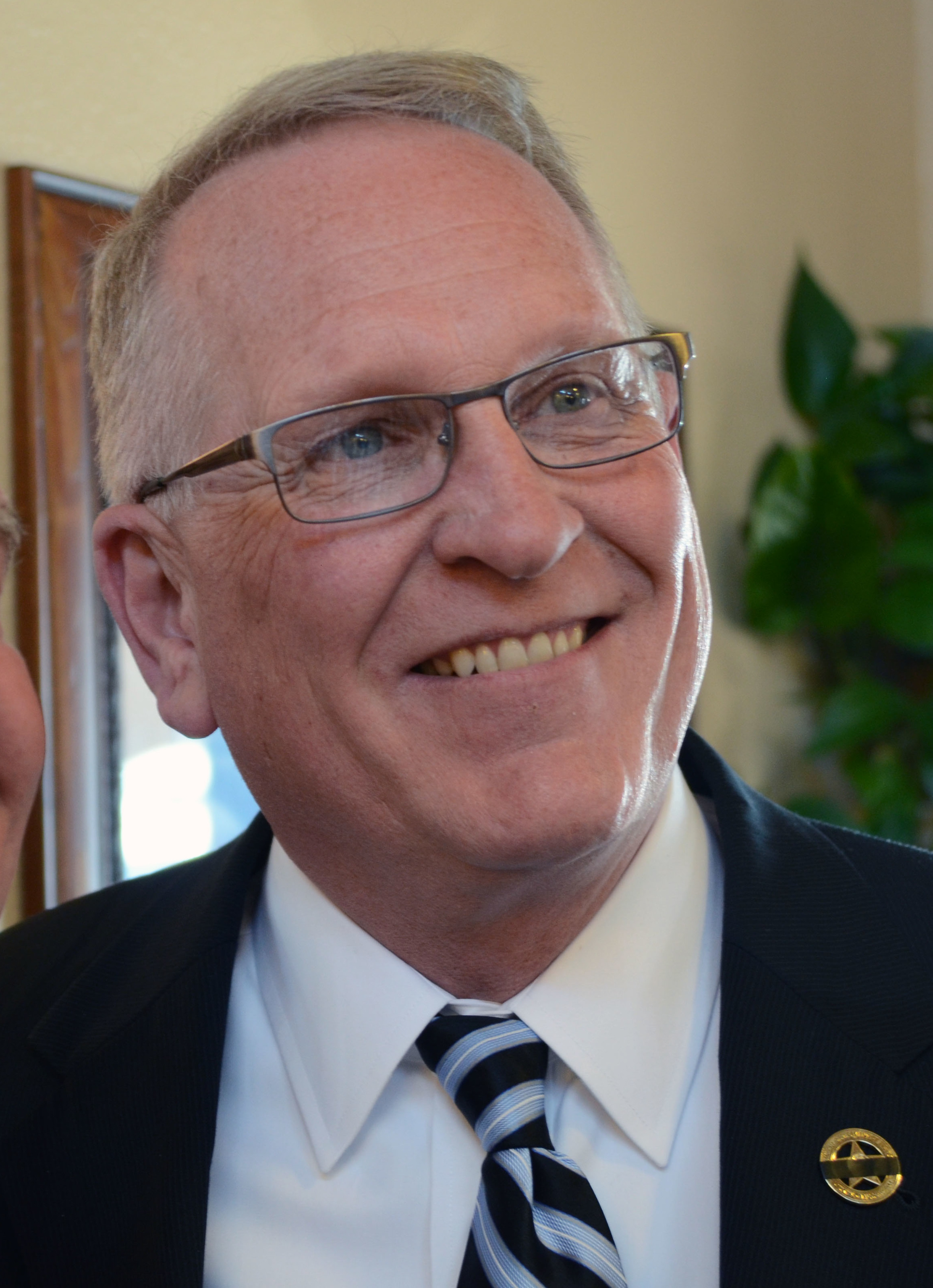

24th Attorney General of Montana
- In office January 7, 2013 – January 4, 2021
- Governor: Steve Bullock
- Preceded by: Steve Bullock
- Succeeded by: Austin Knudsen

Personal details
- Born: Timothy Charles Fox; August 22, 1957 (age 69) Hardin, Montana, U.S.
- Party: Republican
- Spouse: Karen Fox
- Children: 4
- Education: University of Montana (BS, JD, MPA)

Timothy Charles Fox (born August 22, 1957) is an American lawyer and Republican politician who served as the attorney general of Montana from 2013 to 2021. Fox was a candidate for governor of Montana in the Republican primary of the 2020 election.

== Early life and education ==
Fox was born on August 22, 1957. A native of Hardin, Montana, he is one of five sons of Rich and Roberta Fox. Fox graduated from the University of Montana with a bachelor's degree in geology and then received his Juris Doctor from the University of Montana School of Law. He has also earned a master's degree in public administration from the University of Montana.

== Career ==
=== Montana Attorney General (2013–2021) ===
A Republican, Fox was elected Montana Attorney General in 2012 and was re-elected in 2016. During Fox's tenure, the Montana Department of Justice created a statewide testing and tracking system for untested rape kits. Along with other Republican attorneys general, Fox filed suit against the Obama administration's Clean Power Plan and against the Environmental Protection Agency over the Waters of the United States Rule. Fox had represented the inland states' interests in a lawsuit against the state of Washington over its refusal to permit a coal export terminal that would provide access to Asian markets.

In December 2020, Fox joined with Texas attorney general Ken Paxton's brief to SCOTUS to delay the electoral college votes of four states. Fox stated that he wanted to address irregularities in the four states that would have favored Democrats. Paxton sued the states of Georgia, Michigan, Wisconsin, and Pennsylvania, where certified results showed Joe Biden the electoral victor over President Donald Trump. Paxton, who is being investigated by the FBI, was thought to be fishing for a pardon from Trump. Fox joined the lawsuit seeking to overturn the results of the presidential election by challenging election processes in four states where Trump lost. Fox and 16 other states' Attorneys General who supported Paxton's challenge of the election results alleged numerous instances of unconstitutional actions in the four states' presidential ballot tallies, arguments that had already been rejected in other state and federal courts.

In Texas v. Pennsylvania, Paxton asked the United States Supreme Court to invalidate the states' sixty-two electoral votes, allowing Trump to be declared the winner of a second presidential term. Because the suit has been characterized as a dispute between states, the Supreme Court retains original jurisdiction, though it frequently declines to hear such suits. There was no evidence of consequential illegal voting in the election. Paxton's lawsuit included claims that had been tried unsuccessfully in other courts and shown to be false. Officials from each of the four states described Paxton's lawsuit as having recycled false and disproven claims of irregularity. The merits of the objections were sharply criticized by legal experts and politicians. Election law expert Rick Hasen described the lawsuit as "the dumbest case I've ever seen filed on an emergency basis at the Supreme Court." Nebraska Republican senator Ben Sasse said the situation of Paxton initiating the lawsuit "looks like a fella begging for a pardon filed a PR stunt", in reference to Paxton's own state and federal legal issues (securities fraud charges and abuse of office allegations). On December 11, the U.S. Supreme Court quickly rejected the suit which Fox had joined, in an unsigned opinion.

=== 2020 Montana gubernatorial campaign ===
Fox was a candidate for Governor of Montana in the 2020 election. He lost the Republican primary in a landslide to Greg Gianforte, earning just 27% of the vote.

== Personal life ==
Fox and his wife, Karen, have four children and six grandchildren. He is a cancer survivor.

== Electoral history ==
Election results can be found on the website of the Montana Secretary of State.

Election	Political result	Candidate	Party	Votes	%
Montana Attorney General Republican Primary, 2008	Republican win	Tim Fox	Republican	43,662	56.6
Montana Attorney General Republican Primary, 2008	Republican win	Lee Bruner	Republican	33,424	43.4
Montana Attorney General Election, 2008	Democratic hold	Steve Bullock	Democratic	245,669	52.6
Montana Attorney General Election, 2008	Democratic hold	Tim Fox	Republican	220,992	47.4
Montana Attorney General Republican Primary, 2012	Republican win	Tim Fox	Republican	70,239	57.8
Montana Attorney General Republican Primary, 2012	Republican win	Jim Shockley	Republican	51,343	42.2
Montana Attorney General Election, 2012	Republican gain from Democratic	Tim Fox	Republican	252,916	53.7
Montana Attorney General Election, 2012	Republican gain from Democratic	Pam Bucy	Democratic	218,228	46.3
Attorney General Republican Primary, 2016	Republican win	Tim Fox	Republican	unopposed	
Montana Attorney General Election, 2016	Republican hold	Tim Fox	Republican	332,766	67.67
Montana Attorney General Election, 2016	Republican hold	Larry Jent	Democratic	158,970	32.33

Legal offices
Preceded by Steve Bullock	Attorney General of Montana; 2013–2021	Succeeded by Austin Knudsen
