= Steve Bullock (American politician) =

American politician and lawyer (born 1966)

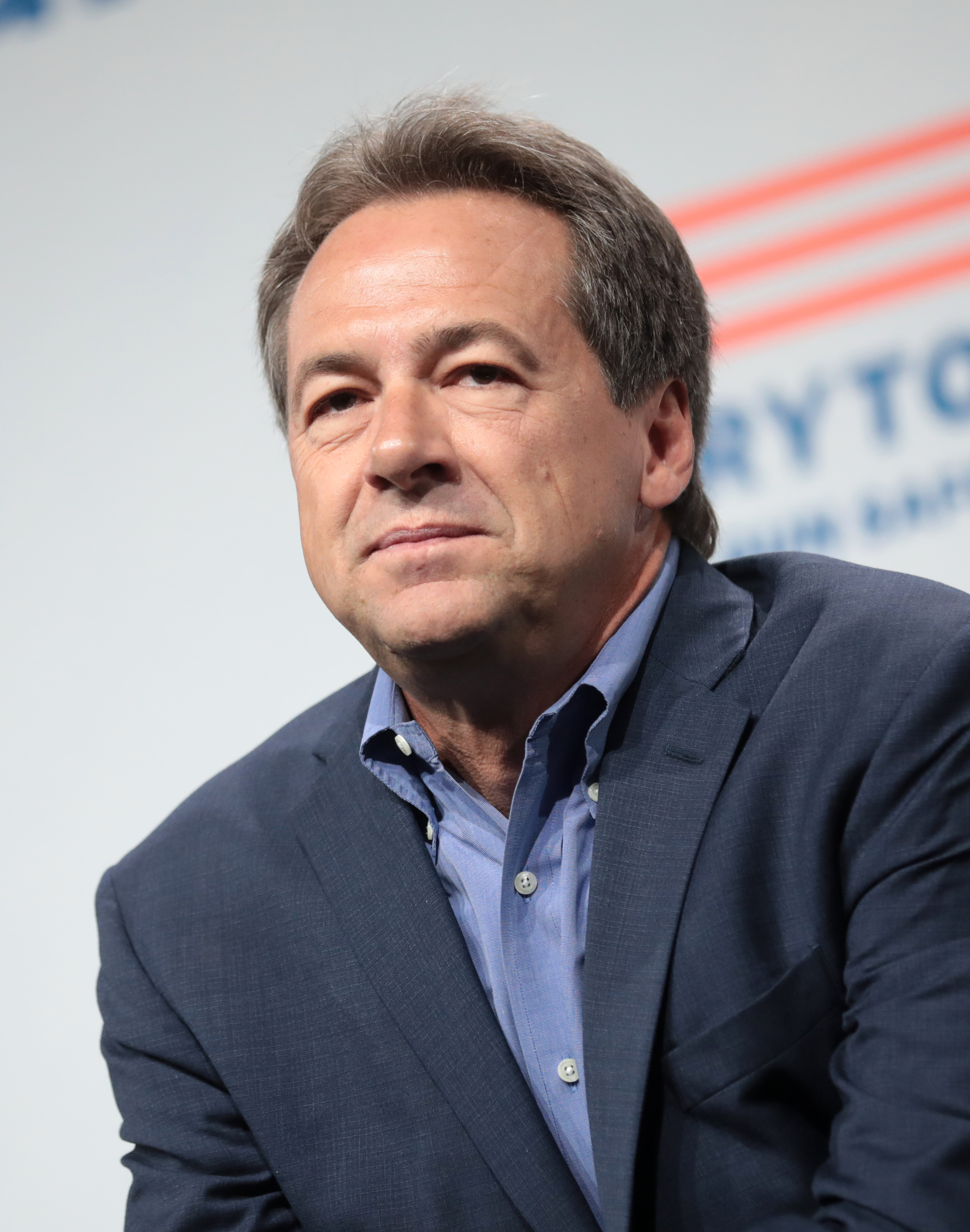
- Bullock in 2019

24th Governor of Montana
- In office January 7, 2013 – January 4, 2021
- Lieutenant: John Walsh; Angela McLean; Mike Cooney
- Preceded by: Brian Schweitzer
- Succeeded by: Greg Gianforte

Chair of the National Governors Association
- In office July 21, 2018 – July 26, 2019
- Preceded by: Brian Sandoval
- Succeeded by: Larry Hogan

23rd Attorney General of Montana
- In office January 5, 2009 – January 7, 2013
- Governor: Brian Schweitzer
- Preceded by: Mike McGrath
- Succeeded by: Tim Fox

Personal details
- Born: Stephen Clark Bullock; April 11, 1966 (age 60) Missoula, Montana, U.S.
- Party: Democratic
- Spouse: Lisa Downs (m. 1999)
- Children: 3
- Education: Claremont McKenna College (BA); Columbia University (JD)
- Website: Official website

Stephen Clark Bullock (born April 11, 1966) is an American politician and lawyer who served as the 24th governor of Montana from 2013 to 2021. He is a member of the Democratic Party.

Born in Missoula, Montana, Bullock graduated from Claremont McKenna College and Columbia Law School. He began his career working as legal counsel to the Secretary of State of Montana before becoming the Executive Assistant Attorney General and acting Chief Deputy Attorney General of Montana. Bullock then entered private practice as a lawyer for Steptoe & Johnson. He was an adjunct professor at George Washington University Law School before opening his own law firm upon returning to Montana. In 2008, Bullock was elected Attorney General of Montana, and he served one term from 2009 to 2013.

Bullock declared his candidacy for governor of Montana on September 7, 2011. Bullock won the Democratic primary with 87% of the vote and defeated Republican former Congressman Rick Hill in the general election with 48.9% of the vote. In 2016, Bullock was reelected with 50.3% of the vote, defeating Republican nominee Greg Gianforte.

Bullock chaired the National Governors Association from 2018 to 2019. He was a Democratic candidate for President of the United States in 2020. After suspending his presidential campaign, he announced his candidacy for the United States Senate in the 2020 election. Bullock lost the 2020 Senate election to incumbent Senator Steve Daines.

On January 20, 2022, Bullock was appointed by Secretary of the Interior Deb Haaland to the inaugural board of directors of the Foundation for America's Public Lands. Bullock's post-gubernatorial public appearances have tended to focus on the importance of bipartisanship, moderation, and democracy. As of 2024, he is the most recent Democrat to serve as Attorney General or Governor of Montana.

== Early life, education, and legal career ==
Bullock was born in Missoula, Montana, and raised in Helena, the state capital. He is the son of Penny Clark, a school board trustee, and Mike Bullock, a teacher and administrator. Bullock attended Helena High School where he met his wife, Lisa Downs, and graduated in 1984. His parents divorced when he was in grade school. Bullock received his B.A. degree in Philosophy, Politics & Economics (PPE) from Claremont McKenna College and his J.D. degree with honors from Columbia Law School. He and Lisa married in 1999 and they have three children.

In 1996, Bullock served as chief legal counsel to Montana Secretary of State Mike Cooney. He went on to work for four years with the Montana Department of Justice under Attorney General Joe Mazurek, first as executive assistant attorney general, and later as acting chief deputy (1997–2001). During this time, he also served as legislative director, coordinating the Attorney General's legislative efforts.

He was unsuccessful in his first race for Montana Attorney General, losing the 2000 Democratic primary to Mike McGrath, who went on to be elected Attorney General that year and later served as Chief Justice of the Montana Supreme Court. From 2001 to 2004, Bullock practiced law with Steptoe & Johnson in Washington, D.C., where he also served as an adjunct professor at George Washington University Law School. He returned to Montana in 2004, working in private practice in Helena.

== Attorney General of Montana ==
Bullock was the Democratic nominee for Attorney General in 2008, defeating two other candidates in the June primary election. He went on to win the contested general election race with 52.64% of the vote against Republican Tim Fox. Bullock received 245,669 votes, more than either other candidate. Under Bullock, the Attorney General's office initiated the 24/7 Sobriety Program which requires repeat DUI offenders to take daily alcohol tests.

The Attorney General's office also pursued the railroad industry for monopolistic business practices and took part in a 16-state effort to urge the federal government to use antitrust authority against consolidation in agriculture. Bullock focused on the misclassification of employees as independent contractors and allowing FedEx to avoid paying millions in state taxes and fees. His efforts resulted in changes by FedEx to comply with federal and state laws.

Bullock attracted national attention by challenging the Citizens United v. Federal Election Commission decision through his defense of Montana's 100-year-old ban on corporate campaign expenditures. After winning in the Montana Supreme Court, the U.S. Supreme Court ruled against the State of Montana in a 5–4 decision.

Bullock, who authored the state's opinion guaranteeing access to rivers, streams, and public lands, worked with the legislature and Governor Brian Schweitzer to codify the access opinion into law.

== Governor of Montana ==
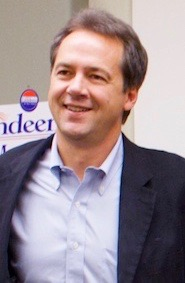
Bullock at a campaign event in Glasgow, Montana, October 31, 2012.

=== Elections ===
On September 7, 2011, Bullock announced his candidacy for governor of Montana in 2012. In the Democratic primary, he faced Helena resident Heather Margolis. Bullock won with 87% of the vote. Bullock's running mate was John Walsh, the former Adjutant General of the Montana National Guard.

Bullock pledged to give Montana homeowners a one-time $400 property tax rebate to refund a portion of the state's $400 million budget surplus. The proposal became a bill in 2013 but died in committee.

Bullock narrowly won the November 6 election, defeating former Republican Congressman Rick Hill with 48.9% of the vote to Hill's 47.3%. Libertarian candidate Ron Vandevender received 3.8%.

In 2016, Bullock was reelected with 50.2% of the vote, defeating Republican nominee Greg Gianforte. His running mate was Lt. Gov. Mike Cooney, who had become lieutenant governor in January 2016 after being appointed by Bullock to fill a vacancy. Bullock and Cooney were the only two Democrats to retain statewide offices in the 2016 elections as the Republicans captured the offices of Montana Superintendent of Public Instruction, Montana State Auditor, and Montana Secretary of State and held onto the offices of Montana Attorney General and U.S. Representative for Montana's at-large congressional district.

=== First term ===
Bullock and Walsh were sworn in on January 7, 2013. Bullock later appointed Walsh to become the new Senator from Montana to replace Max Baucus, who had been appointed Ambassador to China. Bullock then appointed Angela McLean to replace Walsh as lieutenant governor. In November 2015, McLean announced her resignation as lieutenant governor, effective upon the appointment of her successor, in order to accept the position of director of American Indian and minority achievement in the office of the state commissioner of higher education. In December 2015, Bullock announced the appointment of Mike Cooney as McLean's replacement. Cooney was sworn in on January 4, 2016. According to a September 20, 2016, survey by Morning Consult, Bullock, with a 66% approval rating and a 19% disapproval rating, was the most popular Democratic governor in the United States, as well as the fourth-most popular overall, behind Republicans Dennis Daugaard of South Dakota, Larry Hogan of Maryland, and Charlie Baker of Massachusetts.

=== Second term ===
Bullock began his second term on January 2, 2017, alongside Lieutenant Governor Cooney. Following the 2016 elections, Bullock faced large Republican majorities in the Montana Legislature. Republicans gained three State Senate seats and widened their Senate majority over the Democrats to 32–18 while maintaining a 59–41 majority in the Montana House of Representatives, the same as in 2015.

Bullock chaired the National Governors Association from 2018 to 2019.

In the 2018 state legislative elections in Montana, Democrats won 42 of 100 seats in the Montana House of Representatives and gained two seats in the Montana Senate. This meant that, in the 2019 state legislative session that Bullock presided over, Republicans held 60% of the seats in the upper chamber and 58% in the lower chamber of the legislature.

In November 2020, Bullock was named as a potential Secretary of the Interior in the Biden administration.

==== COVID-19 pandemic ====
During the COVID-19 pandemic, Bullock created a task force on March 3, 2020, declared a state of emergency on March 12, and closed public schools March 15. He issued a stay-at-home order on March 26; earlier that day, the Montana Hospital Association requested such an order. The order was described as having been implemented early in the pandemic and before many other states. In July, Bullock issued a statewide face mask mandate for indoor public places and large outdoor gatherings. In August, he gave county election officials permission to implement all-mail-in voting if they choose.

== 2020 presidential campaign ==
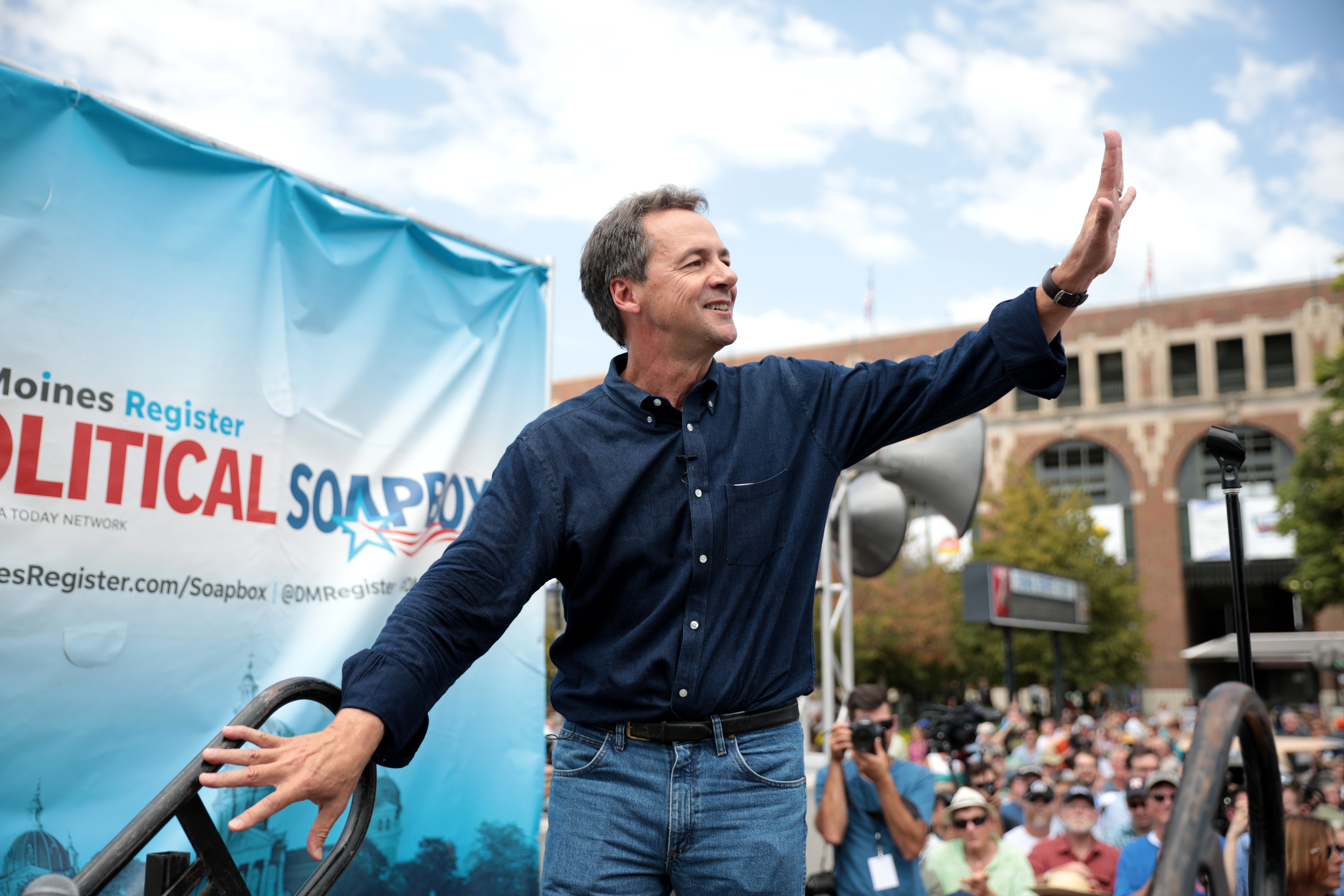
Bullock speaking at the 2019 Des Moines Register Soapbox at the Iowa State Fair.

Bullock's 2020 presidential campaign logo

In 2017 Bullock formed the Big Sky Values PAC, which by spring 2019 had raised nearly $1.8 million, to pay for travel around the United States. On May 14, 2019, Bullock announced his candidacy for the 2020 presidential election. In his announcement video, Bullock said that opposing political "dark money" and legislating against the Citizens United Supreme Court ruling would be among his utmost priorities. Based on his three statewide electoral victories in a Republican-leaning, largely rural state, Bullock held a certain cachet of "electability", and appeared to have a plausible path to the nomination. His mid-May entrance was relatively late, but he was still able to qualify for the second Democratic debate in July. Even so, the late start left him with less media exposure than his numerous rivals: he found it hard to raise funds, and never rose above 1% in nationwide polls. He ended his campaign on December 2, 2019.

== 2020 U.S. Senate campaign ==
Senate election result by counties

On March 4, 2020, after months of speculation and denials from Bullock himself, The New York Times reported that Bullock would enter Montana's U.S. Senate election to challenge Republican incumbent Steve Daines. The move came after Senate Minority Leader Chuck Schumer (D-NY) flew to Montana to persuade Bullock to run and after Bullock talked with former president Barack Obama. Bullock ran for the seat formerly held for six terms by Democrat Max Baucus.

Bullock officially declared his candidacy on March 9, 2020, the last day to file. Bullock's entrance into the race prompted three other Democratic candidates to drop out. Before Bullock entered the race, this seat was projected to be a safe Republican hold. However, Bullock's entrance shifted the dynamics of the contest; many political pundits then considered it a competitive race and a potential pickup for Democrats.

On June 2, 2020, Bullock won the three-way Democratic primary with 95.5% of the vote.

Democrats outspent Republicans, $82 million to $63 million, on this race; it was one of the most expensive Senate races in the 2020 cycle.

On November 3, 2020, Daines defeated Bullock by 10 points in the general election.

== Post-gubernatorial career ==
As of 2022, Bullock served on the bipartisan advisory board of States United Democracy Center. On January 20, 2022, Bullock was appointed by Secretary of the Interior Deb Haaland to the inaugural board of directors of the Foundation for America's Public Lands, a congressionally-chartered non-profit tasked with leveraging private and public money to protect public lands under the Bureau of Land Management. Bullock's post-gubernatorial public appearances have tended to focus on the importance of bipartisanship, moderation, and democracy.

== Political positions ==
Bullock has been described by The Washington Post and ABC News as a moderate Democrat. The New York Times referred to Bullock as being among centrist Democratic governors.

=== Abortion ===
In 2017, Bullock vetoed measures to outlaw abortions after 20 weeks, citing constitutional rulings on the women's ability to protect their lives and health and arguing that elected officials should not put personal beliefs above medical professionals' judgment. He has said that he personally believes life begins at viability but that "it's not up to people like me to be making these decisions". In 2018, Bullock wrote a letter to Secretary of Health and Human Services Alex Azar requesting that Title X funding for reproductive health care and family planning for low-income women remain in effect, saying the program had generated more than $29 million in savings.

=== Campaign finance reform ===
As Attorney General of Montana, Bullock advocated on behalf of the state's century-old ban on corporate money in elections, the Montana Corrupt Practices Act of 1912. After that and similar laws were struck down by the U.S. Supreme Court's Citizens United v. FEC decision in 2010, Bullock countered with a new case, American Tradition Partnership, Inc. v. Bullock (2012). The Supreme Court disposed of the case in a 5–4 decision, but Bullock continued to advocate for campaign finance reform throughout his time as governor of Montana.

In 2015, Bullock steered the DISCLOSE Act, a bipartisan campaign finance reform bill that bolstered disclosure requirements in Montana elections, through a GOP-controlled state legislature.

In June 2018, Bullock signed an executive order that required the recipients of major government contracts in Montana to disclose "dark money spending" in elections, including spending disclosure not explicitly required by federal law.

On July 24, 2018, Bullock sued the Internal Revenue Service and the U.S. Department of the Treasury over a recent decision to dispense with donor requirements for nonprofit organizations.

=== Climate change and environment ===
Bullock acknowledges the scientific consensus on climate change and has said, "To not acknowledge or deal with our changing climate in a responsible way is shortsighted and dangerous." Montana became the first state to halt preparations for the Clean Power Plan when the United States Supreme Court announced a stay of the plan in February 2016.

In September 2014, Bullock signed an executive order creating a habitat conservation plan for sage-grouse in a bid to keep management of the imperiled bird in state hands rather than see it come under federal Endangered Species Act protection.

=== Democratic Party ===
In 2015, Bullock said that there are "roles for all of us Democrats" in the Democratic party, referring to liberals, moderates, and conservatives alike.

Bullock endorsed Hillary Clinton in the 2016 presidential election but expressed disagreement with Clinton's opposition to coal mining, an important industry in Montana. He did not attend the 2016 Democratic National Convention, citing his duties as governor.

In the 2016 elections, Bullock was one of just two Democrats, and the only Democratic incumbent, to win a gubernatorial election in states Donald Trump won. He has publicly argued that the Democratic Party needs to expand its reach beyond urban areas and the coasts, encouraging Democrats to engage with and attempt to persuade voters in suburban and rural areas rather than relying solely on base turnout. He visited Iowa, Wisconsin, and Colorado to speak in support of Democratic candidates during the 2018 election cycle, leading some to speculate, correctly, that he was considering a presidential run.

=== Death penalty ===
In 2019, Bullock said he supports the death penalty in "limited circumstances" like terrorism—a stance that distinguished him from the crowded 2020 Democratic presidential field.

=== Gun policy ===
In 2009, Bullock opposed a ban on semiautomatic weapons. In 2016, he opposed gun control and universal background checks, saying that "Second Amendment rights [had] been expanded in Montana" during his tenure. But in 2018, Bullock wrote an op-ed in The Great Falls Tribune saying he had come to support universal background checks, as well as magazine size limits and red flag laws, citing research showing lowered deaths from domestic violence, suicide, and the killing of law enforcement officers. He called himself "a gun owner who believes in the Constitution, yet also recognizes its limits". In the wake of the Stoneman Douglas High School shooting, he also reversed his opposition to banning assault weapons, saying they were rarely used for hunting or self-defense. He continues to oppose measures such as mandatory gun registration, and has suggested that extreme proposals by Democrats may play into the hands of industry lobbyists.

=== Health care ===
Bullock expanded Medicaid coverage in Montana under the Affordable Care Act with a Republican-dominated state legislature. He is in favor of expanding accessibility to healthcare and trying to protect, improve, and strengthen the Affordable Care Act. He favors a public option, rather than a single-payer system.

=== Immigration ===
As Attorney General, Bullock opposed a 2012 voter-approved law intended to deny government jobs and services to undocumented immigrants by requiring state agencies to verify the immigration status of applicants through a federal database. The law was ultimately ruled unconstitutional and legally unenforceable.

In 2015, Bullock supported a federal decision to allow the admission of Syrian refugees, despite pushback from Republican state legislators; he promised that ensuring the safety of Montanans would be his "top priority" and that the vetting process was "extraordinarily thorough".

Bullock supports the Deferred Action for Childhood Arrivals (DACA) program and in 2017 was one of 11 governors to sign a letter in support of legislation to protect DACA recipients and ensure they can "continue to live, work, and contribute to the country they have called home for most of their lives."

In 2018, Bullock refused to deploy National Guard troops from Montana to the Mexican border "based simply on the whim of the President's morning Twitter habit." He voiced opposition to the Trump administration's family separation policy, saying the separations "must end immediately."

=== LGBT rights ===
Bullock supports same-sex marriage and praised the federal judge who struck down Montana's same-sex marriage ban in 2014, making Montana the 34th U.S. state to legalize same-sex marriage. He also supported the U.S. Supreme Court's ruling in Obergefell v. Hodges, which legalized same-sex marriage nationwide, and said in a statement on June 26, 2015: "This ruling protects the right of all Montanans to marry the person they love, and moves our state and nation closer to the promise of freedom, dignity, and equality that they were founded upon. All people, regardless of their sexual orientation, should have the opportunity to make a good life for themselves and their families." Bullock has also spoken at Pride rallies in Montana and in 2015 became the first sitting governor in Montana history to officiate a same-sex wedding.

In 2016, Bullock enacted an executive order that prohibits state agencies, state contractors, and subcontractors from discriminating in employment on the basis of sexual orientation or gender identity. The executive order expanded upon one signed by Governor Brian Schweitzer in 2008, which had similar goals but did not include protections for gender identity and did not apply to contractors or subcontractors.

=== Net neutrality ===
Bullock supports net neutrality and opposed the Federal Communications Commission's decision to repeal it. On January 22, 2018, Bullock signed an executive order prohibiting any internet service provider with a state government contract from blocking or charging additional fees for faster delivery of websites, two major principles of net neutrality. Through this executive order, Montana became the first state to implement and enforce net neutrality after the FCC repeal. The governors of New York, New Jersey, Vermont, Hawaii, and Rhode Island eventually followed suit.

=== Organized labor ===
Bullock has been recognized and endorsed by the American Federation of Labor and Congress of Industrial Organizations (AFL–CIO) and the Montana Education Association - Montana Federation of Teachers for his support of worker's rights and public education.

Bullock opposes right-to-work legislation, which allows workers to forgo paying union dues while still benefitting from union-negotiated labor contracts. Montana is the only state in the Upper Rocky Mountain region of the U.S. that does not have right-to-work legislation in place; its neighboring states do not provide the same level of protection for labor unions.

On January 18, 2018, Bullock filed an amicus brief to the U.S. Supreme Court in support of allowing labor unions to make "agency fees" mandatory. He opposed the U.S. Supreme Court's decision in Janus v. AFSCME and said in a statement: "The US Supreme Court just overturned 40 years of settled law that workers, employers and unions across the country rely on. All the more ironic, the 5–4 decision cited Citizens United as a reason to do so."

== See also ==
- Dark Money (film)

Legal offices
Preceded by Mike McGrath	Attorney General of Montana; 2009–2013	Succeeded by Tim Fox
Party political offices
Preceded by Brian Schweitzer	Democratic nominee for Governor of Montana; 2012, 2016	Succeeded by Mike Cooney
Preceded by Peter Shumlin	Chair of the Democratic Governors Association; 2014–2015	Succeeded by Dan Malloy
Preceded by Amanda Curtis	Democratic nominee for U.S. Senator from Montana (Class 2); 2020	Succeeded by Alani Bankhead
Political offices
Preceded by Brian Schweitzer	Governor of Montana; 2013–2021	Succeeded by Greg Gianforte
Preceded by Brian Sandoval	Chair of the National Governors Association; 2018–2019	Succeeded by Larry Hogan
U.S. order of precedence (ceremonial)
Preceded by Brian Schweitzer as Former Governor	Order of precedence of the United States; Within Montana	Succeeded by Jack Markell as Former Governor
Preceded by Brian Schweitzer as Former Governor	Order of precedence of the United States; Outside Montana	Succeeded by Christine Gregoire as Former Governor
