= Mike Cooney =

36th Lieutenant Governor of Montana

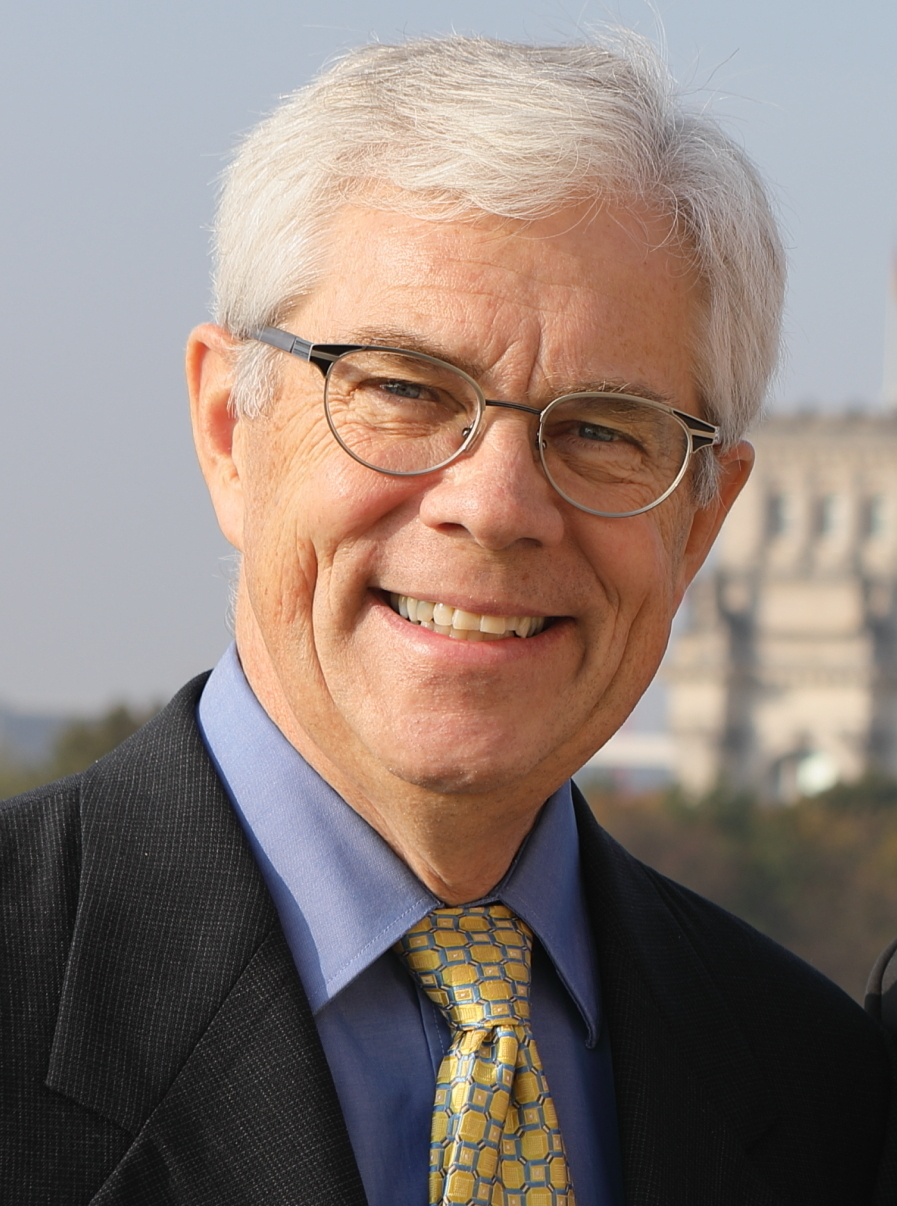
- Cooney in 2017

36th Lieutenant Governor of Montana
- In office January 4, 2016 – January 4, 2021
- Governor: Steve Bullock
- Preceded by: Angela McLean
- Succeeded by: Kristen Juras

59th Chair of the National Lieutenant Governors Association
- In office 2018–2019
- Preceded by: Matt Michels
- Succeeded by: Billy Nungesser

President of the Montana Senate
- In office January 3, 2007 – January 3, 2009
- Preceded by: Jon Tester
- Succeeded by: Robert Story

Member of the Montana Senate from the 40th district
- In office January 3, 2005 – January 3, 2011
- Preceded by: Angela McLean
- Succeeded by: Mary Caferro

Member of the Montana Senate from the 26th district
- In office January 13, 2003 – January 3, 2005
- Preceded by: Mignon Waterman
- Succeeded by: Lynda Moss

17th Secretary of State of Montana
- In office January 3, 1989 – January 3, 2001
- Governor: Stan Stephens; Marc Racicot; Judy Martz
- Preceded by: Verner Bertelsen
- Succeeded by: Bob Brown

Member of the Montana House of Representatives from the 83rd district
- In office January 3, 1977 – January 3, 1981
- Preceded by: Al Luebeck
- Succeeded by: Dave Brown

Personal details
- Born: September 3, 1954 (age 71) Washington, D.C., U.S.
- Party: Democratic
- Spouse: DeeAnn Gribble
- Children: 3
- Relatives: Frank Henry Cooney (grandfather)
- Education: University of Montana (BS)
- Website: Campaign website

Michael R. Cooney (born September 3, 1954) is an American politician who served as the 36th lieutenant governor of Montana from 2016 to 2021. He previously served in the Montana House of Representatives (1977–1981), as the Secretary of State of Montana (1989–2001), in the Montana Senate (2003–2011), as the president of the Montana Senate (2007–2009) and ran unsuccessfully for Governor of Montana in 2000. Cooney was the Democratic nominee for governor of Montana in the 2020 election, losing to Republican U.S. Representative Greg Gianforte.

Among other positions, Cooney has served as executive director of Montana Healthy Mothers, Healthy Babies (2001–2006), division administrator of the Workforce Services Division at the Montana Department of Labor and Industry (2006–2015), director of the Montana Historical Society (2010–2011), and deputy commissioner of the Montana Department of Labor and Industry (2015–2016). As of 2024, he was the most recent Democrat elected as Lieutenant Governor of Montana

== Early life and education ==
Born in Washington, D.C., Cooney was raised in Butte, Montana. His grandfather, Frank Henry Cooney, served as the state's 9th governor of Montana from 1933 to 1935.

Growing up, Cooney played drums in local bands. He worked at the family business, Cooney Food Brokerage, from 1970 to 1977. He graduated from Butte High School in 1972 and, intending to become a TV news presenter, enrolled at University of Montana to study journalism.

== Career ==
=== Early career ===
Before beginning his studies, he worked at KXLF-TV in Butte in 1972. There, he met Max Baucus, who was campaigning for election to the Montana House of Representatives. Cooney was impressed by Baucus, who was elected to the multi-member 18th District in first place, and when Baucus ran for Montana's 1st congressional district against Republican incumbent Richard G. Shoup in 1974, Cooney paused his studies to work for him. He worked as an advance man, travelling to towns ahead of Baucus to prepare for his visits. Cooney enjoyed himself immensely and "I decided right then and there that's what I wanted to do."

=== State House ===
After Baucus won, Cooney returned to the University of Montana and changed his major to Political Science. During the 1975 session of the Montana Legislature, Cooney worked for an insurance lobby group and enjoyed the legislative process. Thus, when a seat in the Montana House opened up in the Silver Bow County-based 83rd District in 1976, Cooney decided to run. He modelled his campaign literature on Baucus' and campaigned door-to-door, which was unusual at the time. He later admitted that his family name may have helped him and quipped that when he was campaigning on the doorstep, some people thought he was collecting for the local paper. The 21 year-old Cooney defeated two other candidates in the Democratic primary with 1,044 votes (54.52%) and was unopposed in the general election. However, this was also a time of personal sorrow for Cooney, whose father died of a heart attack in August 1976, aged 60.

Cooney, sworn into office at age 22, became one of the youngest state legislators in Montana history. He immediately received attention as he and another Butte-based legislator voted for Hamilton Representative John Driscoll as Speaker of the House instead of fellow Butte Representative J. D. Lynch, helping Driscoll to beat Lynch. Cooney said that he thought Lynch would be able to offer "a little more diplomacy" with the Montana Senate, which was evenly divided between Democrats and Republicans. In 1977, Cooney sponsored successful legislation that declared Montana would process its own nuclear waste but wouldn't take waste from any other state. He has called this his proudest achievement in the State House. He ran for re-election in 1978, defeating a single primary opponent with 1,577 votes (62.41%) and again ran unopposed in the general election.

In 1979, Cooney received his Bachelor of Science from the University of Montana and in that December, he married DeeAnn Gribble after five years of dating. Cooney then felt the need to settle down in a permanent job, so did not run for re-election in 1980. The Montana Legislature is part-time and Cooney had supplemented it with other work: at his family's company until 1977 and then at the Montana Energy Research Development Institute from 1977 to 1979, all the while continuing to work as an Executive Assistant for Baucus, who had been elected to the U.S. Senate in 1978. The Cooneys moved to Washington, D.C. in 1982 so that DeeAnn could attend Antioch School of Law and Mike transferred to Baucus' staff there. After DeeAnn graduated, the Cooneys moved back to Montana and Mike joined Senator Baucus' Helena office as his wife joined a local law firm.

=== Secretary of State of Montana ===
Cooney continued working for Baucus until 1988, when he was encouraged to run for Secretary of State of Montana. An old friend of his sent a $100 campaign donation after hearing Cooney defend Baucus' vote for the Gramm–Rudman–Hollings Balanced Budget Act of 1985 and Cooney decided to run. He received permission from Baucus to run, though reluctantly, as Baucus did not want to lose him, so Cooney agreed to only campaign on evenings and weekends. Cooney was unopposed in the Democratic primary and defeated the Republican nominee, State Senator Pete Story, by 174,917 votes (49.28%) to 163,830 (46.16%). His victory was considered an upset as he was outspent by his opponent and Republicans had won the open gubernatorial seat, incumbent Democratic U.S. Senator John Melcher was defeated by Republican Conrad Burns and George H. W. Bush carried the state's four electoral votes in the presidential election. Along with Montana Superintendent of Public Instruction Nancy Keenan and Clerk of the Montana Supreme Court Ed Smith, Cooney was one of only three Democrats to win a statewide election in Montana that year.

Cooney succeeded two-term Republican Jim Waltermire in the office, who had been running for Governor of Montana in the 1988 election when he was killed in a plane crash on April 8, 1988, after returning from a campaign event. Cooney said that the office had been "fairly political" under Waltermire: several employees asked Cooney how much they would be expected to contribute to his campaign fund in order to retain their jobs. Cooney later recalled that, "having just come from working for a U.S. senator where that's illegal, I was stunned. I assured everybody that they were not expected to pony up any money for my political activities and I expected them to just do their jobs."

Cooney was elected to a second term in 1992, defeating Republican Bob Werner, a former Waltermire employee, by 249,359 votes (64.05%) to 139,977 (35.95%). He did not face a Republican opponent in 1996, winning a third term against Libertarian Martha Oaas by 309,503 votes (83.96%) to 59,125 (16.04%).

Cooney said that his aim as secretary of state was to avoid being deeply involved in partisan politics and to give everyone, regardless of their politics, a fair chance. He names his greatest achievement as secretary of state in persuading the Legislature to let the office be run more like a business and having it funded entirely from fees paid for its services rather than through taxes. He is also proud of his work upgrading the computer systems used by the office, increasing voter turnout to second in the country in the 1998 elections, increasing access to state lands through his role on the State Land Board, and updating and restoring the historic Montana State Capitol. However, he pronounced himself frustrated that he wasn't able to persuade the Legislature to pass any of his campaign finance legislation.

=== 2000 gubernatorial election ===
Unable to run for a fourth term as secretary of state because of term limits, Cooney ran for Governor of Montana in the 2000 election instead. In February 2000, he announced six-term state representative Diana Wyatt of Great Falls as his running mate, calling her "a woman of vision, courage and commitment".

Cooney campaigned on three main goals: long-term economic development, encouraging businesses to stay in Montana and attracting new ones by working with them to develop and implement creative strategies; making education a higher priority through increased funding, giving a $3,000 bonus to teachers who become nationally board certified, creating a teacher-to-teacher mentoring programme, and increasing opportunities for technology and tribal colleges; and protecting Montana's environmental heritage by increasing funding for scientific research, protecting roadless land, working with loggers and conservationists to create forest stewardship programmes, and placing a moratorium on new game farms until more scientific research was done. His opponents in the Democratic primary were Montana Attorney General Joe Mazurek and Montana State Auditor and Insurance and Securities Commissioner Mark O'Keefe. Cooney was outraised by them both, raising as of March 5, $112,028 to Mazurek's $167,362 and O'Keefe's $241,309.

In the three-way Democratic primary on June 6, Cooney finished third with 15,677 votes (16.27%) to Mazurek's 34,385 (35.69%) and O'Keefe's 46,294 (48.05%). O'Keefe went on to lose the general election to Republican lieutenant governor Judy Martz by 193,131 votes (47.08%) to 209,135 (50.99%). Cooney left office in January 2001 and was named Executive Director of Montana Healthy Mothers, Healthy Babies in that November, a position he held until 2006.

=== State senate ===
Cooney returned to politics in 2002, running to represent the Helena-based 26th District of the Montana Senate. Unopposed in the Democratic primary, he defeated Republican Mary Jo Fox in the general election by 5,314 votes (68.12%) to 2,487 (31.88%). He was redistricted to the 40th District in 2005 and was re-elected to a second term in 2006 against Republican Robert Leach by 5,869 votes (68.18%) to 2,739 (31.82%).

In 2007, Cooney was selected by Senate Democrats to become President of the Senate, succeeding Jon Tester, who had been elected to the U.S. Senate in 2006. He served as President of the Senate from 2007 to 2009, when the Democrats lost control of the Senate to the Republicans. In 2008, he used his position as Senate President to argue forcefully for the Legislature to update the state's anti-discrimination laws to make it illegal to fire or discriminate against someone at the workplace just because they are gay, lesbian, bisexual or transgender. Cooney was term-limited in 2010 and left office the following year. He was succeeded by Democratic state representative Mary Caferro.

=== Montana Department of Labor and Industry ===
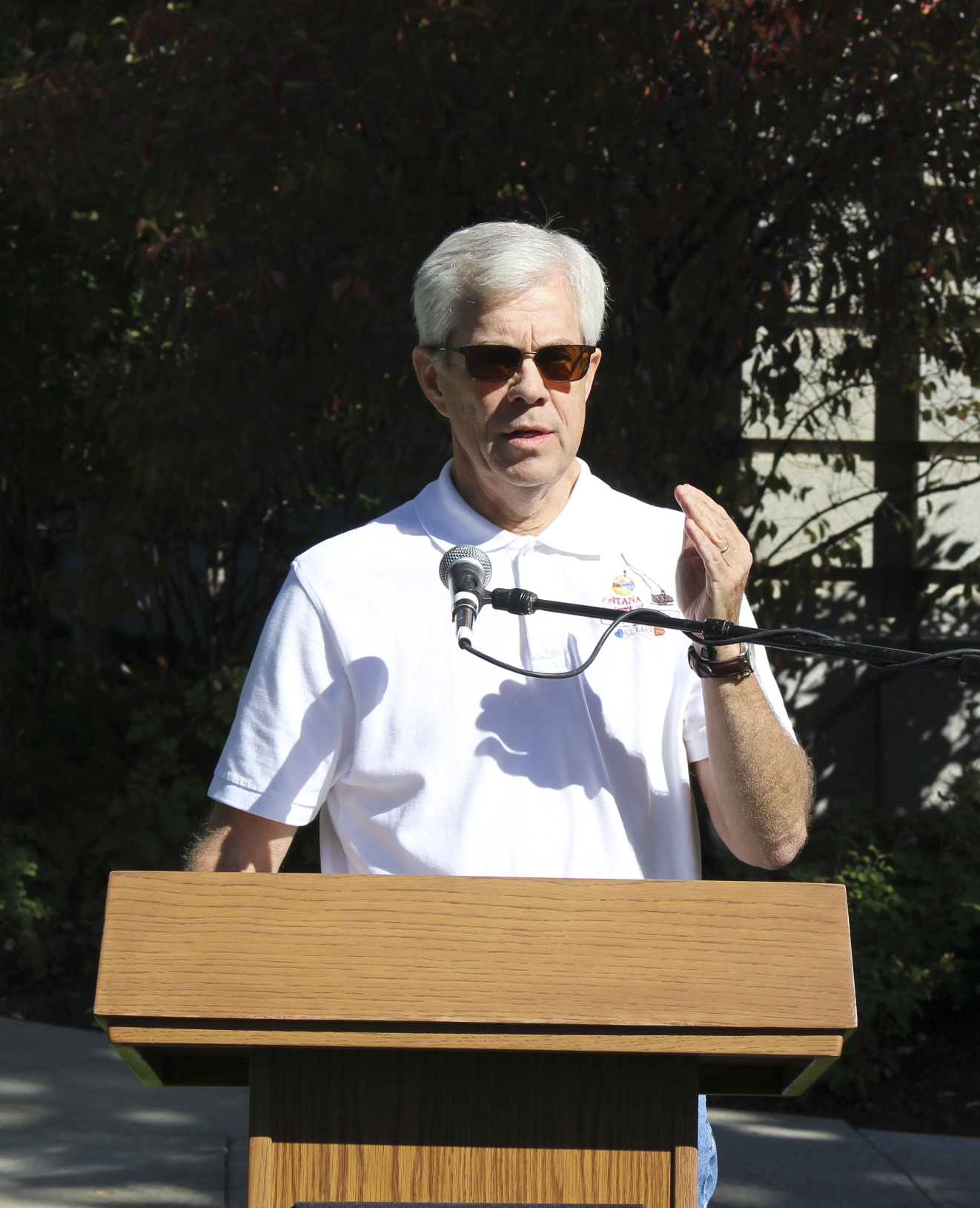
Cooney in 2015

Cooney left Montana Healthy Mothers, Healthy Babies in July 2006 to become the Division Administrator of the Workforce Services Division at the Montana Department of Labor and Industry, a role he held until 2015. Cooney was named as the interim Director of the Montana Historical Society in November 2010. He declined to be considered as the new permanent Director, despite urging from staff, who wore "I Like Mike" badges, and led the organisation until September 2011, when Bruce Whittenberg took over as permanent Director. In 2015, he was promoted to become the Deputy Commissioner of the Montana Department of Labor and Industry, a job he performed until his selection as lieutenant governor.

=== Lieutenant Governor of Montana ===
Cooney's predecessor in the Lieutenant Governor's office was Angela McLean, who was appointed to the position in February 2014 following John Walsh's departure for the United States Senate. McLean served less than a year in the position before leaving the Lieutenant Governor's office for a job at the Office of the Commissioner of Higher Education effective December 2015.

Following McLean's resignation announcement, Governor Bullock undertook a selection process to fill the upcoming vacancy for what would be Bullock's third lieutenant governor since his inauguration in January 2013. On December 30, Bullock announced the appointment of Cooney. Coincidentally, Bullock had appointed Cooney's wife DeeAnn to replace retiring judge Jeffrey Sherlock in the state's 1st Judicial District in Helena earlier that month. Cooney had known and worked with Bullock for over 20 years; Bullock had served as chief legal counsel for Cooney when Cooney was secretary of state. In his announcement, Bullock described Cooney as an "accomplished leader" who will bring "values" to state government. Cooney follows in the footsteps of his grandfather, who served briefly as lieutenant governor in 1933 prior to serving as governor. Cooney was sworn into office on January 4, 2016. His salary is $22,000 a year less than he had been receiving as Deputy Commissioner of the Montana Department of Labor and Industry.

Cooney ran with Bullock in the 2016 gubernatorial election, defeating Republican gubernatorial nominee Greg Gianforte and his running mate Lesley Robinson with 250,571 votes (50.2%) to 231,897 (46.4%).

=== 2020 gubernatorial election ===
On July 3, 2019, Cooney announced his second run for governor in the 2020 election, as incumbent Democratic governor Steve Bullock was term-limited and running for U.S. Senate. Cooney won the Democratic primary on June 2, defeating businesswoman Whitney Williams with 56% of the vote to Williams' 44%. On November 3, 2020, he was defeated in the general election by Republican U.S. Rep. Greg Gianforte.

== Electoral history ==
=== 2020 ===
2020 Montana Democratic gubernatorial primary results
Party	Candidate	Votes	%
Democratic	Mike Cooney	76,411	55.6%
Democratic	Whitney Williams	60,990	44.4%
Total votes		137,401	100.0%

2020 Montana gubernatorial election
Party	Candidate	Votes	%	±%
Republican	Greg Gianforte	328,548	54.43%	+8.08%
Democratic	Mike Cooney	250,860	41.56%	−8.69%
Libertarian	Lyman Bishop	24,179	4.01%	+0.61%
Total votes		603,587	100.00%	

=== Past elections ===
Montana House of Representatives District 83 Democratic primary election, 1976
Party	Candidate	Votes	%
Democratic	Mike Cooney	1,044	54.52
Democratic	Larry Buckley	450	23.50
Democratic	Jon Hughes	421	21.98

Montana House of Representatives District 83 Election, 1976
Party	Candidate	Votes	%
Democratic	Mike Cooney	2,922	100.00

Montana House of Representatives District 83 Democratic primary election, 1978
Party	Candidate	Votes	%
Democratic	Mike Cooney (inc.)	1,577	62.41
Democratic	Marko Lucich	950	37.59

Montana House of Representatives District 83 Election, 1978
Party	Candidate	Votes	%
Democratic	Mike Cooney (inc.)	2,642	100.00

Montana Secretary of State Election, 1988
Party	Candidate	Votes	%
Democratic	Mike Cooney	174,917	49.28
Republican	Pete Story	163,830	46.16
Libertarian	Larry Dodge	16,174	4.56

Montana Secretary of State Election, 1992
Party	Candidate	Votes	%
Democratic	Mike Cooney (inc.)	249,359	64.05
Republican	Robert Werner	139,977	35.95

Montana Secretary of State Election, 1996
Party	Candidate	Votes	%
Democratic	Mike Cooney (inc.)	309,503	83.96
Libertarian	Martha Oaas	59,125	16.04

Montana Governor Democratic primary election, 2000
Party	Candidate	Votes	%
Democratic	Mark O'Keefe	46,294	48.04
Democratic	Joseph Mazurek	34,385	35.69
Democratic	Mike Cooney	15,677	16.27

Montana State Senate District 26 Election, 2002
Party	Candidate	Votes	%
Democratic	Mike Cooney	5,314	68.12
Republican	Mary Jo Fox	2,487	31.88

Montana State Senate District 40 Election, 2006
Party	Candidate	Votes	%
Democratic	Mike Cooney (inc.)	5,871	68.19
Republican	Bob Leach	2,739	31.81

Political offices
Preceded by Verner Bertelsen	Secretary of State of Montana; 1989–2001	Succeeded by Bob Brown
Preceded by Jon Tester	President of the Montana Senate; 2007–2009	Succeeded by Robert Story
Preceded by Angela McLean	Lieutenant Governor of Montana; 2016–2021	Succeeded by Kristen Juras
Party political offices
Preceded by Steve Bullock	Democratic nominee for Governor of Montana; 2020	Succeeded by Ryan Busse
