= 1988 United States Senate election in Montana =

- November 8, 1988
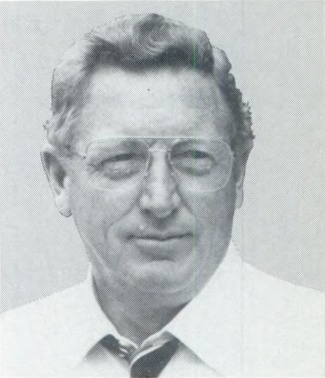

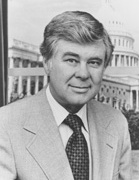
Nominee	Conrad Burns	John Melcher
Party	Republican	Democratic
Popular vote	189,445	175,809
Percentage	51.87%	48.13%
- Burns: 50–60% 60–70% 70–80% Melcher: 50–60% 60–70%
U.S. senator before election
John Melcher
Democratic
Elected U.S. Senator
Conrad Burns
Republican

The 1988 United States Senate election in Montana took place on November 8, 1988. Incumbent United States Senator John Melcher, who was first elected to the Senate in 1976 and was re-elected in 1982, ran for re-election. After winning the Democratic primary, he faced Yellowstone County Commissioner Conrad Burns in the general election, and a grueling campaign followed. Ultimately, Melcher was narrowly defeated in his bid for re-election by Burns, who became the first Republican Senator from Montana in 36 years since Zales Ecton lost re-election in 1952.

== Democratic primary ==
=== Candidates ===
- John Melcher, incumbent U.S. Senator
- Bob Kelleher, perennial candidate

=== Results ===
Democratic primary results
Party	Candidate	Votes	%
Democratic	John Melcher (incumbent)	88,457	74.54
Democratic	Bob Kelleher	30,212	25.46
Total votes		118,669	100.00

== Republican primary ==
=== Candidates ===
- Conrad Burns, Yellowstone County Commissioner
- Tom Faranda

=== Results ===
Republican primary results
Party	Candidate	Votes	%
Republican	Conrad Burns	63,330	84.71
Republican	Tom Faranda	11,427	15.29
Total votes		74,757	100.00

== General election ==
=== Results ===
United States Senate election in Montana, 1988
Party	Candidate	Votes	%	±%
Republican	Conrad Burns	189,445	51.87%	+10.20%
Democratic	John Melcher (incumbent)	175,809	48.13%	−6.33%
Majority		13,636	3.73%	−9.06%
Turnout		365,254		
Republican gain from Democratic		Swing		

==== By congressional district ====
Burns won both congressional districts, including one that elected a Democrat.

District	Melcher	Burns	Representative
1st	47%	53%	Pat Williams
2nd	49.6%	50.4%	Ron Marlenee

== See also ==
- 1988 United States Senate elections

Preceded by 1982	Montana U.S. Senate elections 1988	Succeeded by 1994
