= 2008 Montana gubernatorial election =

- November 4, 2008
- Turnout: 74.5%▲3.1
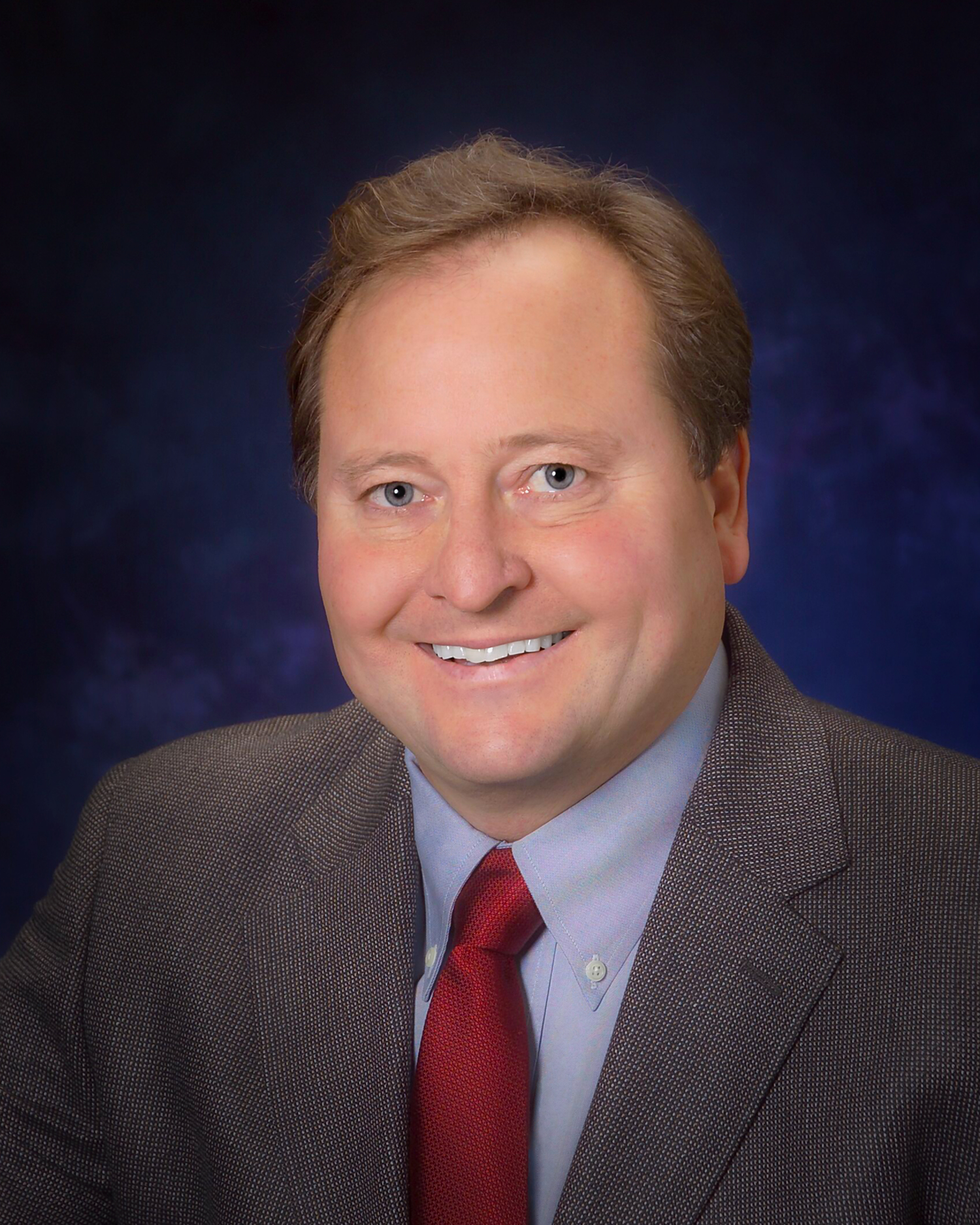

Nominee	Brian Schweitzer	Roy Brown
Party	Democratic	Republican
Running mate	John Bohlinger	Steve Daines
Popular vote	318,670	158,268
Percentage	65.47%	32.52%
- County results Schweitzer: 40–50% 50–60% 60–70% 70–80% 80–90% Brown: 40–50% 50–60% 60–70%
Governor before election
Brian Schweitzer
Democratic
Elected Governor
Brian Schweitzer
Democratic

The 2008 Montana gubernatorial election was held on November 4, 2008, to elect the governor and lieutenant governor of the U.S. state of Montana. Incumbent Governor Brian Schweitzer, a Democrat who was elected to his first four-year term in 2004, was elected to a second term with 65.5% of the vote, despite John McCain narrowly carrying the state during the concurrent presidential election. Incumbent Lieutenant Governor John Bohlinger, a Republican who was once again Schweitzer's running mate, was reelected to a second term. The Republican nominee was Roy Brown, a member of the Montana Senate. Brown's running mate was businessman Steve Daines, a future member of both chambers of Congress.

== Democratic primary ==
=== Candidates ===
- William Fischer, small businessman involved in the logging industry in Lakeside, Montana
  - Steve White, small business owner in the telecommunications industry in Kalispell, Montana
- Don Pogreba, Shelby native, English and debate teacher at Helena High School
  - Jason Neiffer, Great Falls native, history teacher at Capital High School
- Brian Schweitzer, incumbent governor of Montana, 2000 U.S. Senate nominee and rancher
  - John Bohlinger, incumbent lieutenant governor of Montana and former Republican member of the Montana House of Representatives and Montana Senate

=== Results ===
Democratic primary results
Party	Candidate	Votes	%
Democratic	Brian Schweitzer (incumbent)	159,820	91.30
Democratic	William Fischer	9,865	5.64
Democratic	Donald Pogreba	5,358	3.06
Total votes		175,043	100.00

== Republican primary ==
=== Candidates ===
- Roy Brown, businessman, member of the Montana Senate and former majority leader of the Montana House of Representatives
  - Steve Daines, businessman
- Larry H. Steele, 2007 candidate for mayor of Great Falls and 2006 candidate for the Montana House of Representatives
  - Harold Luce

=== Primary results ===
Republican primary results
Party	Candidate	Votes	%
Republican	Roy Brown	65,883	80.81
Republican	Larry Steele	15,643	19.19
Total votes		81,526	100.00

== Libertarian primary ==
=== Candidates ===
- Stan Jones, business consultant and United States Air Force veteran
  - Michael Baker

== General election ==
=== Predictions ===
Source	Ranking	As of
The Cook Political Report	Safe D	October 16, 2008
Rothenberg Political Report	Safe D	November 2, 2008
Sabato's Crystal Ball	Safe D	November 3, 2008
Real Clear Politics	Safe D	November 4, 2008

=== Polling ===
Poll source	Dates administered	Brian Schweitzer (D)	Roy Brown (R)	Stan Jones (L)
Public Policy Polling	November 2, 2008	62%	36%	–
Rasmussen Reports	October 1, 2008	56%	41%	–
The Mellman Group (D)	September 16–18, 2008	63%	24%	–
Rasmussen Reports	July 29, 2008	56%	32%	3%
Rasmussen Reports	June 30, 2008	61%	32%	3%
Mason Dixon/Lee Newspapers	May 19–21, 2008	55%	30%	–
Mason Dixon/Lee Newspapers	December 17–19, 2007	55%	30%	–

=== Results ===
2008 Montana gubernatorial election
Party	Candidate	Votes	%	±%
Democratic	Brian Schweitzer (incumbent)	318,670	65.47%	+15.04%
Republican	Roy Brown	158,268	32.52%	−13.50%
Libertarian	Stan Jones	9,796	2.01%	+0.35%
Total votes		486,734	100.00%	N/A
Democratic hold				

==== Counties that flipped from Republican to Democratic ====
- Beaverhead (largest city: Dillon)
- Broadwater (largest city: Townsend)
- Custer (largest city: Miles City)
- Daniels (largest city: Scobey)
- Fallon (largest city: Baker)
- Fergus (largest city: Lewistown)
- Flathead (largest city: Kalispell)
- Golden Valley (largest city: Ryegate)
- Granite (largest city: Philipsburg)
- Jefferson (largest city: Clancy)
- Judith Basin (largest city: Stanford)
- Liberty (largest city: Chester)
- Lincoln (largest city: Libby)
- Madison (largest city: Ennis)
- McCone (largest city: Circle)
- Phillips (largest city: Malta)
- Pondera (largest city: Conrad)
- Powell (largest city: Deer Lodge)
- Prairie (largest city: Terry)
- Ravalli (largest city: Hamilton)
- Richland (largest city: Sidney)
- Rosebud (largest city: Colstrip)
- Dawson (largest city: Glendive)
- Mineral (largest city: Superior)
- Gallatin (largest city: Bozeman)
- Chouteau (largest municipality: Fort Benton)
- Sanders (largest city: Thompson Falls)
- Stillwater (largest city: Columbus)
- Teton (largest city: Choteau)
- Toole (largest city: Shelby)
- Wheatland (largest city: Harlowton)
- Wibaux (largest city: Wibaux)
