= Dave Lewis (politician) =

American politician

David M. Lewis

Member of the Montana Senate from the 42nd district
- In office January 3, 2005 – January 5, 2015
- Succeeded by: Jill Cohenour

Member of the Montana House of Representatives from the 55th district
- In office January 3, 2001 – January 3, 2005

Personal details
- Born: October 10, 1942 (age 83) Rapid City, South Dakota, U.S.
- Party: Republican
- Spouse: Karon
- Education: University of Idaho
- Occupation: Government employee

David M. Lewis is an American politician who served in the Montana Legislature from 2001 to 2015. A member of the Republican Party, he was its nominee for Lieutenant Governor of Montana alongside gubernatorial nominee Bob Brown in 2004.

== Biography ==
Lewis was appointed to the Montana Senate District 42 seat, representing the Helena area, in 2004. He was elected in 2006 and 2010. He previously served two sessions in the Montana House of Representatives. Lewis held several positions for the State of Montana prior to being elected to the Montana House of Representatives, most recently including state budget director.
