= Senator Story =

Senator Story may refer to:

- Robert Story (politician) (born 1952), Montana State Senate
- Tammy Story (born 1959), Colorado State Senate

== See also ==
- Leonidas Jefferson Storey (1834–1909), Texas State Senate
