= Senator Van Dyke =

Senator Van Dyke may refer to:

- John Van Dyke (politician) (1807–1878), Minnesota State Senate
- Nicholas Van Dyke (politician, born 1738) (1738–1789), Delaware State Senate
- Nicholas Van Dyke (politician, born 1769) (1769–1826), U.S. senator from Delaware from 1817 to 1826, and Delaware State Senator

== See also ==
- Kendall Van Dyk (born 1980), Montana State Senate
- Henry H. Van Dyck (1809–1888), New York State Senate
