= HMHB =

HMHB may refer to:

- Half Man Half Biscuit, English rock band
- National Healthy Mothers, Healthy Babies Coalition, a former American non-profit organization
