= Roy Brown (Montana politician) =

American politician

Member of the Montana Senate from the 25th district
- In office January 3, 2007 – January 3, 2011
- Preceded by: John Cobb
- Succeeded by: Kendall Van Dyk

Personal details
- Born: Roy Lindsay Brown; February 16, 1951 (age 75) Casper, Wyoming, U.S.
- Party: Republican
- Education: University of Montana, Butte (BS)

Roy Lindsay Brown (born February 16, 1951) is a former Montana state senator from Billings, Montana Senate District 25. He served four terms in the Montana House of Representatives and was elected to the state senate in 2007. He was the Republican nominee for the governor seat in Montana with Steve Daines in 2008. In 2010, Representative Kendall Van Dyk defeated Brown in the general election.

== Early life ==
Brown was born in Casper, Wyoming, in 1951, but his family relocated to Montana in 1955. He attended grade school and high school in Billings. After working in the oil fields as a roughneck, he enrolled at Montana Tech University in Butte, Montana, where he earned a Bachelor of Science degree in petroleum engineering.

From 1974 to 1982 Brown worked for Marathon Oil Company in energy development, a job that took him around the world. In 1983 he returned to Billings to start an oil and gas business. He sold it in 1994 and has been a landlord in the Billings area since that time.

== Political career ==
Roy Brown sold his oil and gas company in Billings, and currently makes a living through rental property in the Billings area. Beginning in 1999, Brown was a member of the Montana House of Representatives. He held leadership positions as a representative as majority whip and house majority leader in the 2002, 2004, and 2006 sessions. Brown's views have traditionally been considered conservative.

Brown lost his 2010 bid for reelection to Democratic state representative Kendall Van Dyk in a recount by a margin of just four votes out of the 6,208 cast.

== 2008 gubernatorial election ==
Brown was the nominee of the state Republican party against incumbent Democratic governor Brian Schweitzer for governor of Montana. He chose Steve Daines as his running mate for lieutenant governor. In his campaign, Brown criticized the increase in state spending seen under Schweitzer. Brown supported a reduction in property taxes for Montanans as well as increased coal development as a means of spurring economic gains and funding the state's educational system. He also called into question Schweitzer's character and judgment, portraying himself and Montanans as the victims of a bully Schweitzer defeated Brown in the general election. Brown received less than 33% of the vote.

Party political offices
Preceded by Bob Brown	Republican nominee for Governor of Montana; 2008	Succeeded by Rick Hill
