= Brian Schweitzer =

23rd Governor of Montana

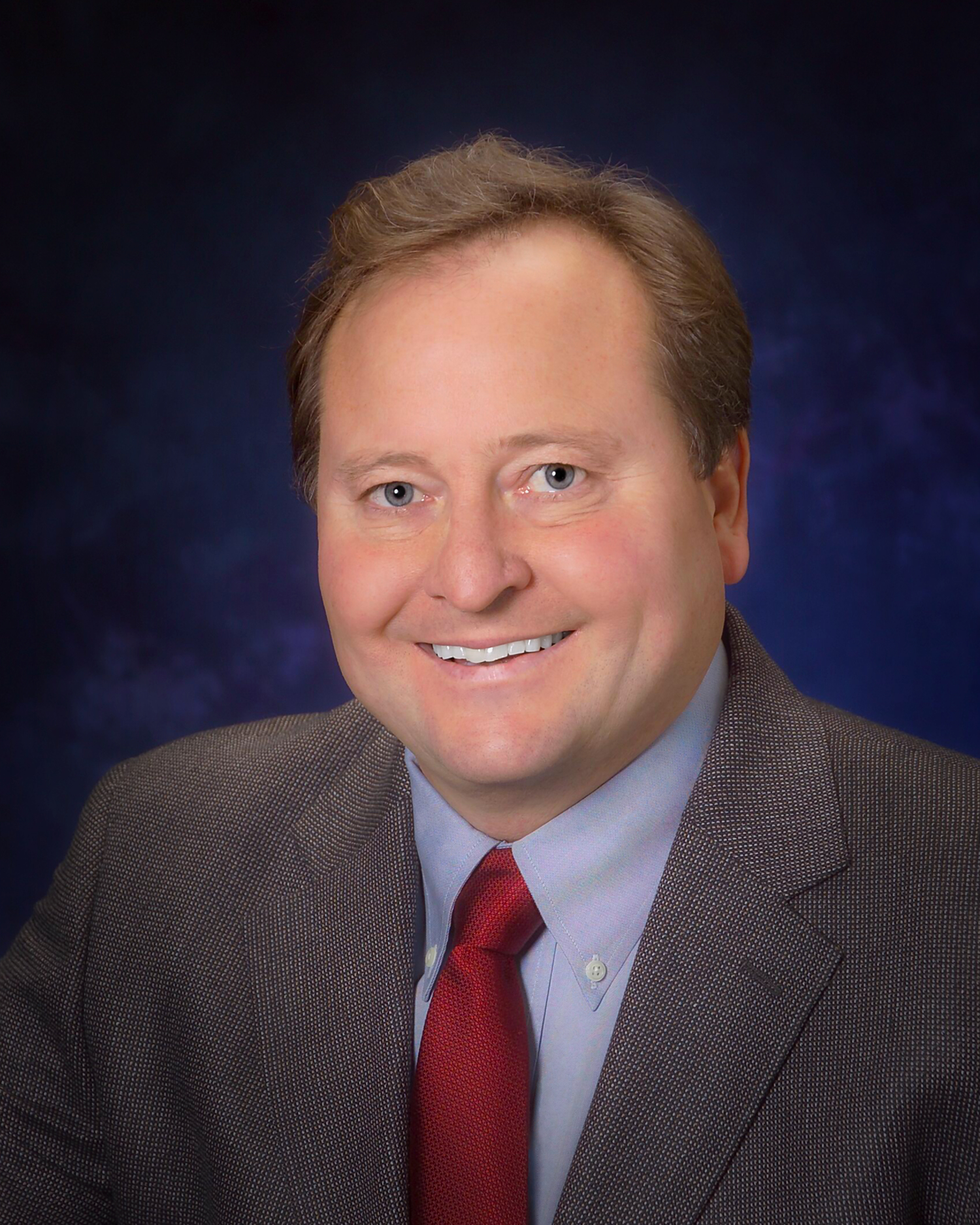

23rd Governor of Montana
- In office January 3, 2005 – January 7, 2013
- Lieutenant: John Bohlinger
- Preceded by: Judy Martz
- Succeeded by: Steve Bullock

Personal details
- Born: Brian David Schweitzer; September 4, 1955 (age 71) Havre, Montana, U.S.
- Party: Democratic
- Spouse: Nancy Hupp (m. 1981)
- Children: 3
- Education: Colorado State University (BS); Montana State University (MS)

Brian David Schweitzer (born September 4, 1955) is an American farmer and politician who served as the 23rd governor of Montana from 2005 to 2013. Schweitzer served for a time as chair of the Western Governors Association as well as the Democratic Governors Association. He also served as president of the Council of State Governments.

== Early life, education and early career ==
Schweitzer was born in Havre, Montana, the fourth of six children of Kathleen Helen (née McKernan) and Adam Schweitzer. His paternal grandparents were ethnic Germans from Kuchurhan in the Odesa Oblast (then in Russian Empire, now in Ukraine); his maternal grandparents were Irish. He is a first cousin, once removed, of entertainer Lawrence Welk (Schweitzer's paternal grandmother was Welk's aunt).

Following his high school years at Holy Cross Abbey, Canon City, Colorado in 1973, Schweitzer earned his Bachelor of Science degree in international agronomy from Colorado State University in 1978 and a Master of Science in soil science from Montana State University, Bozeman in 1980.

Upon finishing school, Schweitzer worked as an irrigation developer on projects in Africa, Asia, Europe and South America. He spent several years working in Libya and Saudi Arabia, and speaks Arabic. He returned to Montana in 1986, settling in Whitefish.

In 1993, the Clinton administration appointed Schweitzer to the United States Department of Agriculture's Farm Service Agency committee for Montana; he worked there for seven years.

== 2000 U.S. Senate election ==
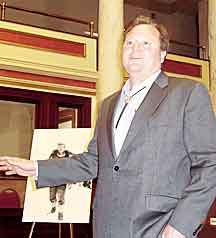
Schweitzer speaking on the Natural Resources Conservation Service.

In 2000, Schweitzer ran for the U.S. Senate to challenge Republican incumbent Conrad Burns. Burns faced a difficult re-election campaign. In February 1999, he announced that he would break his 1988 promise to only hold office for two terms, claiming "Circumstances have changed, and I have rethought my position." Later that same month, while giving a speech about U.S. dependence on foreign oil to the Montana Equipment Dealers Association, Burns referred to Arabs as "ragheads". Burns soon apologized, saying he "became too emotionally involved" during the speech. Burns faced trouble regarding deaths from asbestos in Libby, Montana. While he initially supported a bill to limit compensation in such cases, he withdrew his support for the bill, under public criticism, and added $11.5 million for the town to an appropriations bill.

While Burns attempted to link Schweitzer with presidential candidate Al Gore, Schweitzer "effectively portrayed himself as nonpolitical". Schweitzer primarily challenged Burns on the issue of prescription drugs, organizing busloads of senior citizens to take trips to Canada and Mexico for cheaper medicine. Burns charged that Schweitzer favored "Canadian-style government controls" and claimed that senior citizens went to doctors to have "somebody to visit with. There's nothing wrong with them."

Schweitzer lost narrowly to Burns, with a 51% to 47% margin, despite being outspent two-to-one. Democratic presidential candidate Al Gore received just 33% of the vote in Montana in 2000.

== Governor of Montana (2005–2013) ==
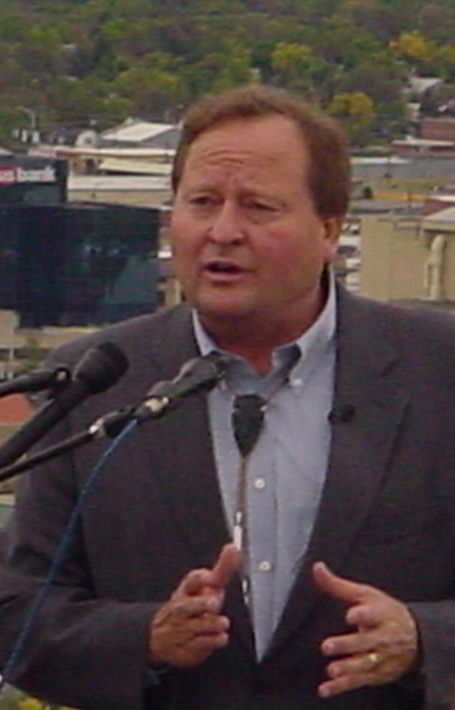
Governor Brian Schweitzer campaigning in Billings, Montana for Jon Tester in September 2006

=== Elections ===
When incumbent Governor Judy Martz announced she would not run for re-election in 2004, Schweitzer announced his candidacy. His running mate was John Bohlinger, a Republican state senator. He won the general election by defeating Montana Secretary of State Bob Brown 50% to 46%.

In 2008, Schweitzer and Bohlinger won re-election to a second term by a landslide over Republican State Senator Roy Brown and his running mate Steve Daines; Schweitzer recurred 318,670 votes (65.4%), Brown received 158,268 votes (32.5%), and Libertarian candidate Stan Jones received 9,796 votes (2.0%).

=== Policy and public image ===
As governor, Schweitzer was described as having a mixture of "progressive values, populist rhetoric, and Western self-reliance." Commentator Brink Lindsey classified Schweitzer as a mixture of liberal and libertarian, espousing "anti-NAFTA, Wal-Mart-bashing economic populism." Both while campaigning and as governor, Schweitzer became known for a folksy public persona; his dog, a Border Collie named Jag, regularly accompanied him on work days at the Capitol, as well as some other official occasions.

Schweitzer was known for his unsparing use of the veto, a power exercised 95 times during his tenure. He vetoed 74 bills in the 2011 legislature, none of which were overridden. For instance, in April 2011, Schweitzer made news with his unconventional use of a branding iron to publicly veto several bills passed by the Republican-controlled legislature. He denounced them as "frivolous, unconstitutional and just bad ideas" that were "in direct contradiction to the expressed will of the people of Montana." The bills vetoed by Schweitzer included anti-abortion legislation and legislation that would have repealed Montana's 2004 legalization of medicinal marijuana.

Schweitzer has pointed out that Montana has had the highest ending fund balances in the state's history under his administration, with an average ending fund balance of $414 million. The average balance of the eighteen years prior was $54 million.

Schweitzer consistently held one of the highest approval ratings among governors in the nation, with polls regularly showing a rating of above 60 percent.

Schweitzer was elected chair of the Democratic Governors Association in 2008.

As governor, Schweitzer emphasized early childhood education, and in 2007 signed into law a voluntary full-time kindergarten program.

In 2005, Schweitzer signed into law "Indian Education for All" funding, which provided for the first time funding for schools to fulfill a mandate passed in 1999 to teach tribal history in Montana schools.

Under Schweitzer, from 2009 to 2012, Montana achieved the country's highest rate of increase in the proportion of its population with college degrees. The increase was attributed to a variety of initiatives backed by Schweitzer, including increased investments in the state's two-year community college system (including an increase in state funding, allowing two-year colleges to freeze tuition), better skills and practical training, additional online courses, a dual enrollment program for high school students, and reforms to make it easier for students to transfer academic credits, such as from a two-year to a four-year college.

During his term as governor, Schweitzer focused on expanding Montana energy production, including both fossil fuels such as coal and oil and renewables such as wind. Schweitzer helped arrange financing for the Rim Rock Wind Farm, which opened in September 2012 as the state's largest wind farm. He strongly supported the proposed Keystone XL pipeline project, which was opposed by environmentalists. In 2008, Schweitzer expressed support for a "25x'25" proposal to transition at least 25% of U.S. energy production to renewable sources by the year 2025.

In 2009, after General Motors voided its contracts with Stillwater Mining Company for the development of platinum and palladium mines in Montana following GM's reorganization in bankruptcy, Schweitzer strongly criticized GM's decision to withdraw from the project. Schweitzer called upon the Obama administration to force GM to continue with the project and expressed concern that the cancellation would harm Montana's mining industry and create a national security risk, as platinum and palladium were mined in only two other nations (Russia and South Africa).

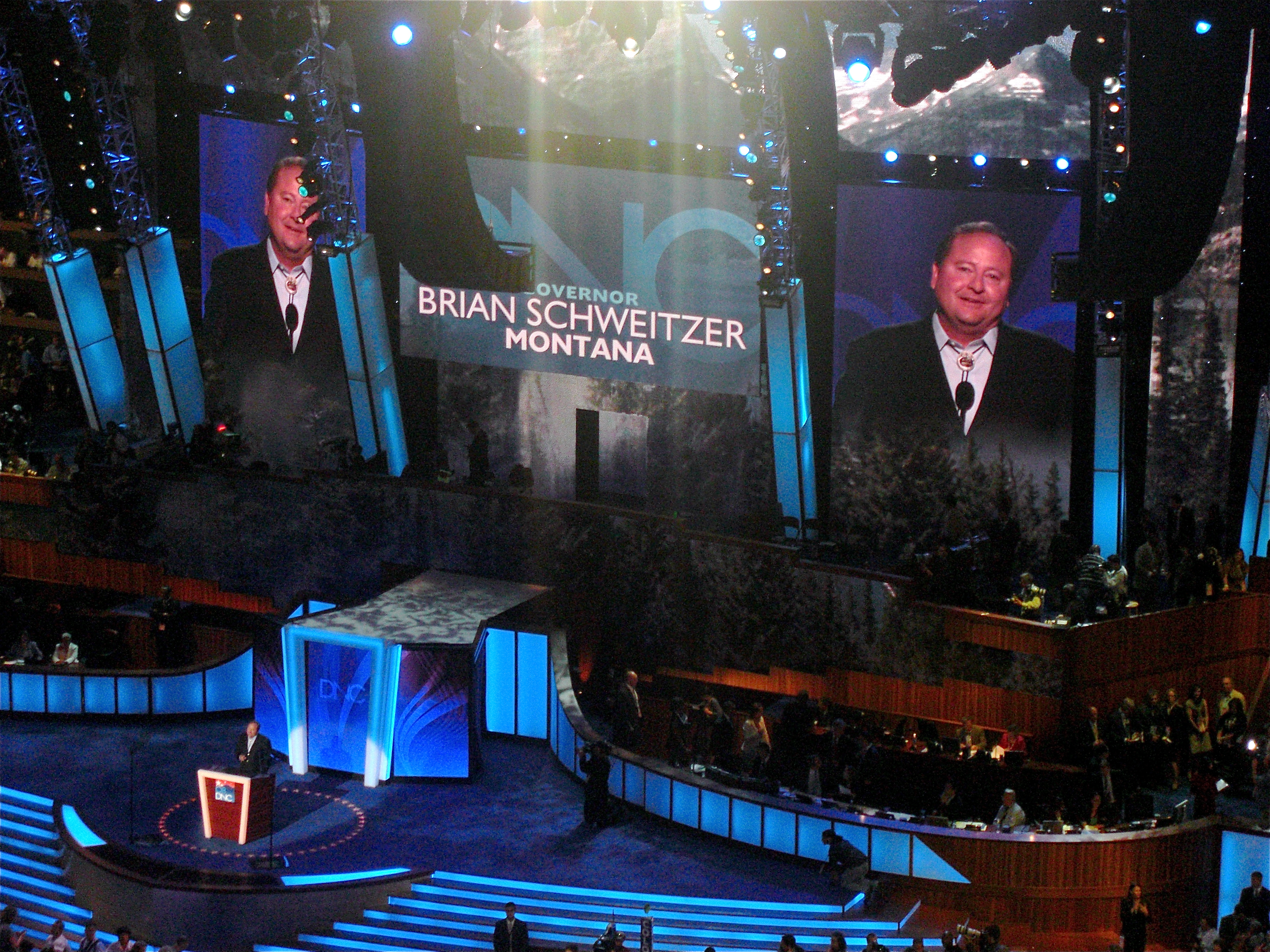
Schweitzer speaks during the second day of the 2008 Democratic National Convention in Denver, Colorado.

As governor, Schweitzer was an outspoken opponent of gun control proposals, and enjoyed the endorsement of the NRA Political Victory Fund.

In April 2009, Schweitzer signed into law the Montana Firearms Freedom Act, a bill that attempted to declare guns manufactured and possessed in Montana as exempt from federal gun regulation. This attempted nullification legislation was emulated by several other states, which passed similar legislation, but never went into effect, because the federal courts struck down the law on federal preemption grounds.

During his tenure in office, Schweitzer proposed the introduction of state-level single-payer health care in Montana, based on the Canadian model. Under Schweitzer, Montana opened a government-owned but privately contracted primary care clinic for state employees, but did not succeed in obtaining HHS permission for the state to import prescription drugs from Canada as a cost-savings measure. Schweitzer was critical of the Affordable Care Act (ACA), the federal health care reform legislation championed by President Barack Obama, saying it did not go far enough in controlling health-care costs, and describing it as a "corporatist" policy, but did not outright oppose the ACA.

In May 2006, Schweitzer granted posthumous pardons to 78 persons convicted in 1918 and 1919 of sedition during World War I for making comments critical of the war. These were the first posthumous pardons in Montana history. The individuals had been convicted under Montana's 1918 Sedition Act (which was subsequently repealed), one of the broadest and harshest of its time: one man went to prison for calling food rationing a joke, while others were targeted because they refused to kiss a U.S. flag or to buy Liberty Bonds. Schweitzer described his pardons as an important reminder of the importance of individual rights in wartime.

Following the suicide of Iraq war veteran Chris Dana in 2007, Schweitzer started the Yellow Ribbon Program, a joint program between the Montana National Guard and the U.S. Department of Veterans Affairs that helps military personnel returning home from overseas to transition back to civilian life.

In a 2008 biography, Schweitzer expressed support for some form of same-sex civil unions, and in 2013 he expressed support for legal recognition of same-sex marriage.

On foreign policy and national security, Schweitzer took positions to the left of Hillary Clinton. In a series of speeches in Iowa in 2013, Schweitzer criticized Clinton and other Democrats who supported the 2002 Iraq War Resolution and called on Democrats to "keep the Iraq war vote in mind" when nominating a presidential candidate in 2016. Schweitzer also occasionally criticized the Obama administration's foreign policy, referring to it as supportive of the "military-industrial complex." In 2014, Schweitzer expressed opposition to domestic surveillance, asserted that "a lot of people that are working within the CIA and the NSA" of "spying illegally on American citizens," and called for Edward Snowden to be granted clemency.

== Post-governorship ==
The same year Schweitzer completed his term as Montana Governor he was named to the board of directors of Stillwater Mining Company on May 2, and subsequently chosen as non-executive chairman on May 17, 2013.

== Presidential and vice-presidential speculation ==
During his gubernatorial tenure, Schweitzer was mentioned by some political pundits as a potential running mate for Barack Obama in the 2008 presidential election. Schweitzer spoke in a prime-time slot at the 2008 Democratic National Convention, addressing the topic of American energy independence.

After leaving office at the end of 2012, Schweitzer was mentioned as a possible candidate for president. In February 2013, the National Journal reported that he indicated he was leaning towards a run for president in 2016 instead of running for the U.S. Senate in 2014; a Senate bid would have involved challenging Democratic U.S. Senator Max Baucus in a primary election. In April 2013, Baucus decided to retire. Soon thereafter, a Democrat associated with Schweitzer stated that Schweitzer was leaning toward a Senate bid in 2014. After Baucus' announcement, Schweitzer stated that he was concentrating on helping a dissident investor group take control of the Stillwater Mining Co. in south-central Montana. He subsequently became the chair of the Board of Stillwater Mine. When asked about the Senate race in June 2013, Schweitzer expressed uncertainty; however, Montana political analysts generally believed that he was considering a Senate run.

On July 13, 2013, Schweitzer stated he would not seek the U.S. Senate seat in Montana in 2014. In February 2015, Schweitzer stated that he has "no plans" to run for president in 2016. In October 2015, Schweitzer endorsed former Maryland Governor Martin O'Malley's campaign for the Democratic nomination for president and was named a national co-chair for O'Malley's campaign.

== Personal life ==
Schweitzer married Nancy Hupp in 1981. The Schweitzers are the parents of three children: Ben, Khai, and Katrina.

== Electoral history ==
Montana Gubernatorial Election 2008
Party	Candidate	Votes	%	±%
Democratic	Brian Schweitzer (incumbent)	316,509	65.4	+15.0
Republican	Roy Brown	157,894	32.6	−13.4
Libertarian	Stan Jones	9,790	2.0	+0.3

Montana Gubernatorial Election 2004
Party	Candidate	Votes	%	±%
Democratic	Brian Schweitzer	225,016	50.4	
Republican	Bob Brown	205,313	46.0	
Green	Robert Kelleher	8,393	1.9	
Libertarian	Stan Jones	7,424	1.7	

Montana U.S. Senate Election 2000
Party	Candidate	Votes	%	±%
Republican	Conrad Burns (incumbent)	208,082	50.6	
Democratic	Brian Schweitzer	194,430	47.2	
Reform	Gary Lee	9,089	2.2	

Party political offices
Preceded by Jack Mudd	Democratic nominee for U.S. Senator from Montana (Class 1); 2000	Succeeded by Jon Tester
Preceded by Mark O'Keefe	Democratic nominee for Governor of Montana; 2004, 2008	Succeeded by Steve Bullock
Preceded by Joe Manchin	Chair of the Democratic Governors Association; 2008–2009	Succeeded by Jack Markell
Political offices
Preceded by Judy Martz	Governor of Montana; 2005–2013	Succeeded by Steve Bullock
U.S. order of precedence (ceremonial)
Preceded by Marc Racicot as Former Governor	Order of precedence of the United States	Succeeded by Steve Bullock as Former Governor
