= 1982 United States Senate election in Montana =

- November 2, 1982
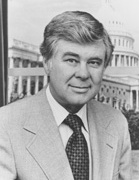

Nominee	John Melcher	Larry R. Williams
Party	Democratic	Republican
Popular vote	174,861	133,789
Percentage	54.46%	41.67%
- County results Melcher: 40–50% 50–60% 60–70% 70–80% Williams: 40–50% 50–60%
U.S. senator before election
John Melcher
Democratic
Elected U.S. Senator
John Melcher
Democratic

The 1982 United States Senate election in Montana took place on November 2, 1982. Incumbent United States Senator John Melcher, who was first elected to the Senate in 1976, opted to run for re-election. He won the Democratic primary after he faced a tough intraparty challenger, and advanced to the general election, where he faced Larry R. Williams, an author and the Republican nominee, and Larry Dodge, the Libertarian nominee. Though his margin was reduced significantly from his initial election, Melcher still comfortably won re-election to his second and final term in the Senate.

== Democratic primary ==
=== Candidates ===
- John Melcher, incumbent United States Senator
- Michael Bond, housing contractor
- Henry Hardy, retired railroad worker

=== Campaign ===
During his first term in the Senate, Melcher's relative conservatism for a Democrat prompted a primary challenger in Michael Bond, a housing contractor who campaigned on his opposition to nuclear war. Bond attacked Melcher for voting to increase spending on nuclear arms, and pledged to reduce military spending to $60 billion and to use the savings to reduce interest rates. During the campaign, Bond came under fire from the state branches of the Veterans of Foreign Wars and the Disabled American Veterans for turning in his draft card in 1967 to protest the Vietnam War, who put out a statement, saying, "There is no place in the U.S. Senate for any draft dodger, draft card burner or draft protester of any kind."

=== Results ===
Democratic Party primary results
Party	Candidate	Votes	%
Democratic	Jack Melcher (incumbent)	83,539	68.27
Democratic	Mike Bond	33,565	27.43
Total votes		122,369	100.00

== Republican primary ==
=== Candidates ===
- Larry R. Williams, 1978 Republican nominee for the United States Senate
- Willie Dee Morris, attorney

=== Results ===
Republican Primary results
Party	Candidate	Votes	%
Republican	Larry Williams	49,615	88.11
Republican	Willie Dee Morris	6,696	11.89
Total votes		56,311	100.00

== General election ==
=== Results ===
United States Senate election in Montana, 1982
Party	Candidate	Votes	%	±%
Democratic	John Melcher (incumbent)	174,861	54.46%	−9.69%
Republican	Larry R. Williams	133,789	41.67%	+5.83%
Libertarian	Larry Dodge	12,412	3.87%	
Majority		41,072	12.79%	−15.52%
Turnout		321,062		
Democratic hold		Swing		

== See also ==
- 1982 United States Senate elections
