= 2004 Montana gubernatorial election =

- November 2, 2004
- Turnout: 71.4%▲11.5
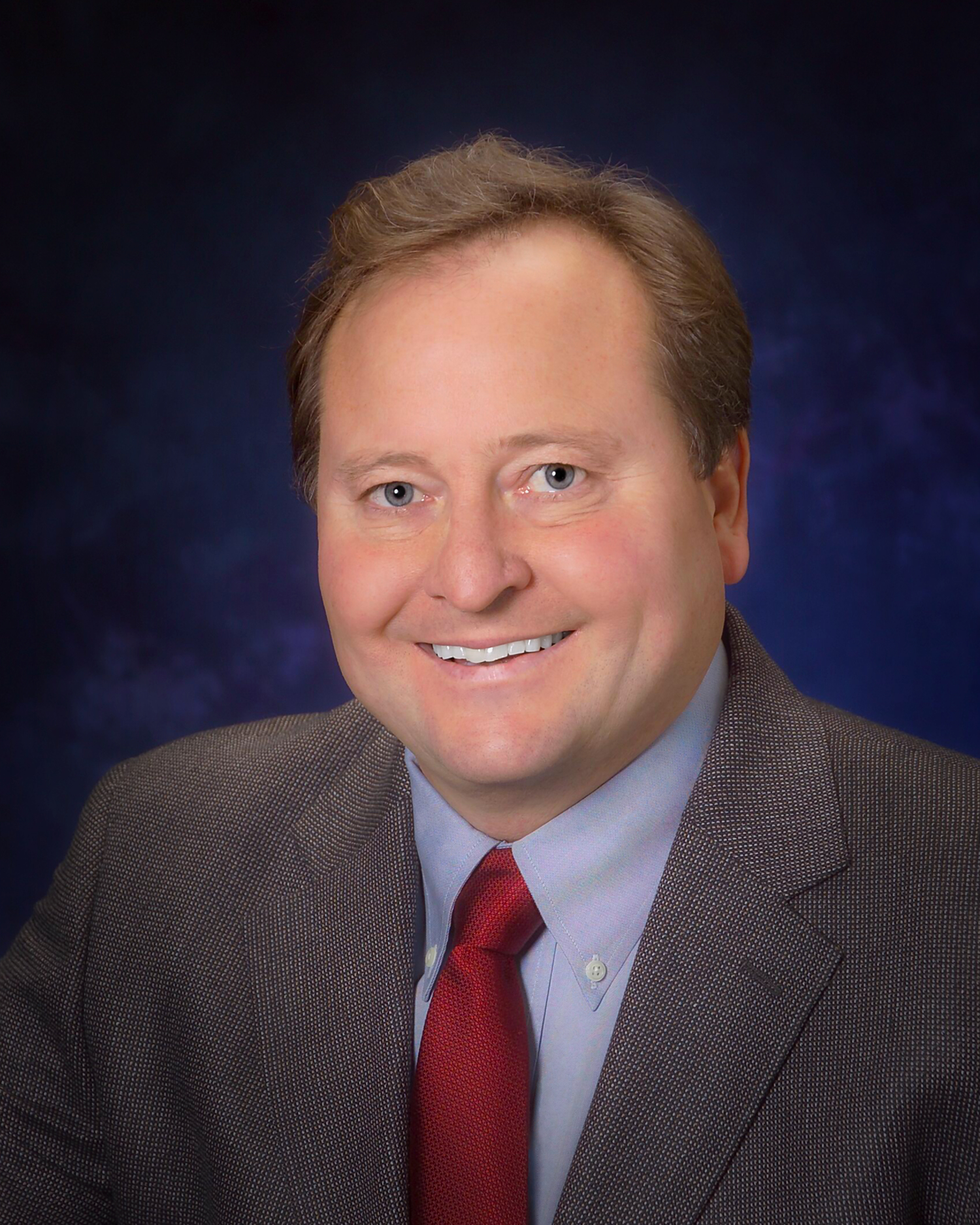

Nominee	Brian Schweitzer	Bob Brown
Party	Democratic	Republican
Running mate	John Bohlinger	Dave Lewis
Popular vote	225,016	205,313
Percentage	50.44%	46.02%
- County results Schweitzer: 40–50% 50–60% 60–70% 70–80% Brown: 40–50% 50–60% 60–70% 70–80%
Governor before election
Judy Martz
Republican
Elected Governor
Brian Schweitzer
Democratic

The 2004 Montana gubernatorial election took place on November 2, 2004, for the post of governor of Montana. The incumbent governor, Judy Martz, a Republican, did not seek reelection. Democrat Brian Schweitzer defeated Montana Secretary of State and Republican nominee Bob Brown with 50.4% of the vote against 46%. Schweitzer formed a ticket with a Republican running mate, choosing state legislator John Bohlinger for the lieutenant governorship. Schweitzer became the first Democrat elected governor of Montana since Ted Schwinden in 1984.

== Democratic primary ==
=== Candidates ===
- Brian Schweitzer, rancher, former United States Department of Agriculture employee, nominee for the United States Senate in 2000
  - Running mate: John Bohlinger, former state representative (1993–1999) and state senator (1999–2005)
- John Vincent, former State Representative (1975–1990), former speaker of the Montana House of Representatives (1985–1986; 1989–1990) and former mayor of Bozeman (1994–1995)
  - Running mate: Mary Sexton, Teton County commissioner

Brian Schweitzer, a rancher from Whitefish, began campaigning for the Democratic nomination over a year before the primary. He had narrowly lost the Senate race to Conrad Burns in 2000. In February 2004 he announced that liberal Republican State Senator John Bohlinger would be his running mate for the post of lieutenant governor. This would be the first bipartisan gubernatorial team since the Montana Constitution was amended in 1972 to require governors and lieutenant governors to run as a team.

In March 2004, John Vincent, a former Speaker of the Montana House of Representatives, entered the race and criticized Schweitzer for taking both sides on some issues. In the end Schweitzer easily won the Democratic primary. Three days after the primary Schweitzer addressed the Montana Democratic Convention; he gave a bear hug to his defeated rival and said he would bring a new kind of leadership to Montana.

=== Polling ===
Poll source	Date(s) administered	Sample size (Note: Key: A – all adults RV – registered voters LV – likely voters V – unclear)	Margin of error	Brian Schweitzer	John Vincent	Undecided
Mason-Dixon (Note: Poll conducted for Lee Enterprises)	May 24–26, 2004	300 (LV)	± 6.0%	59%	22%	19%

Democratic primary results
Party	Candidate	Votes	%
Democratic	Brian Schweitzer	68,738	72.51
Democratic	John Vincent	26,057	27.49
Total votes		94,795	100.00

== Republican primary ==
=== Candidates ===
- Bob Brown, secretary of state of Montana (2001–2005), former state representative (1970–1974) and former state senator (1974–1996)
  - Running mate: Dave Lewis, state representative (2001–2005)
- Pat Davison, conservative businessman
  - Running mate: David Mihalic, former superintendent of Glacier National Park (1994–1999) and Yosemite National Park (1999–2002) for the National Park Service and former adviser to Marc Racicot
- Tom Keating, former state senator (1981–2001)
  - Running mate: Matt Brainard, Montana public service commissioner and former state representative (1995–2001)
- Ken Miller, former state senator (1995–2003) and former Montana Republican Party chairman (2001–2003)
  - Running mate: Wayne Buchanan, former executive secretary for the Montana Board of Public Education

Incumbent Governor Judy Martz had a difficult term of office, with her approval ratings as governor going as low as 20%. In August 2003 she announced she would not run for re-election, as she wanted to spend more time with her family. Lieutenant Governor Karl Ohs was expected to enter the Republican primary race, but decided not to.

Montana Secretary of State Bob Brown, conservative businessman Pat Davison and former State Senators Ken Miller and Tom Keating competed for the nomination. Brown was seen as the favorite in the primary, but was attacked by Pat Davison for being "liberal on taxes". Brown was the only candidate who refused to sign a pledge not to raise taxes, as he said he wanted to keep all options open as governor.

=== Polling ===
Poll source	Date(s) administered	Sample size	Margin of error	Bob Brown	Pat Davison	Ken Miller	Tom Keating	Undecided
Mason-Dixon	May 24–26, 2004	300 (LV)	± 6.0%	26%	25%	13%	9%	27%

Primary results by county: Brown: Brown—51-60%; Brown—41-50%; Brown—31-40%; Davison: Davison—51-60%; Davison—21-30%; Miller: Miller—41-50%; Miller—31-40%; Keating: Keating—21-30%

Republican primary results
Party	Candidate	Votes	%
Republican	Bob Brown	43,145	39.15
Republican	Pat Davison	25,319	22.98
Republican	Ken Miller	24,313	22.06
Republican	Tom Keating	17,421	15.81
Total votes		110,198	100.00

== General election ==
=== Campaign ===
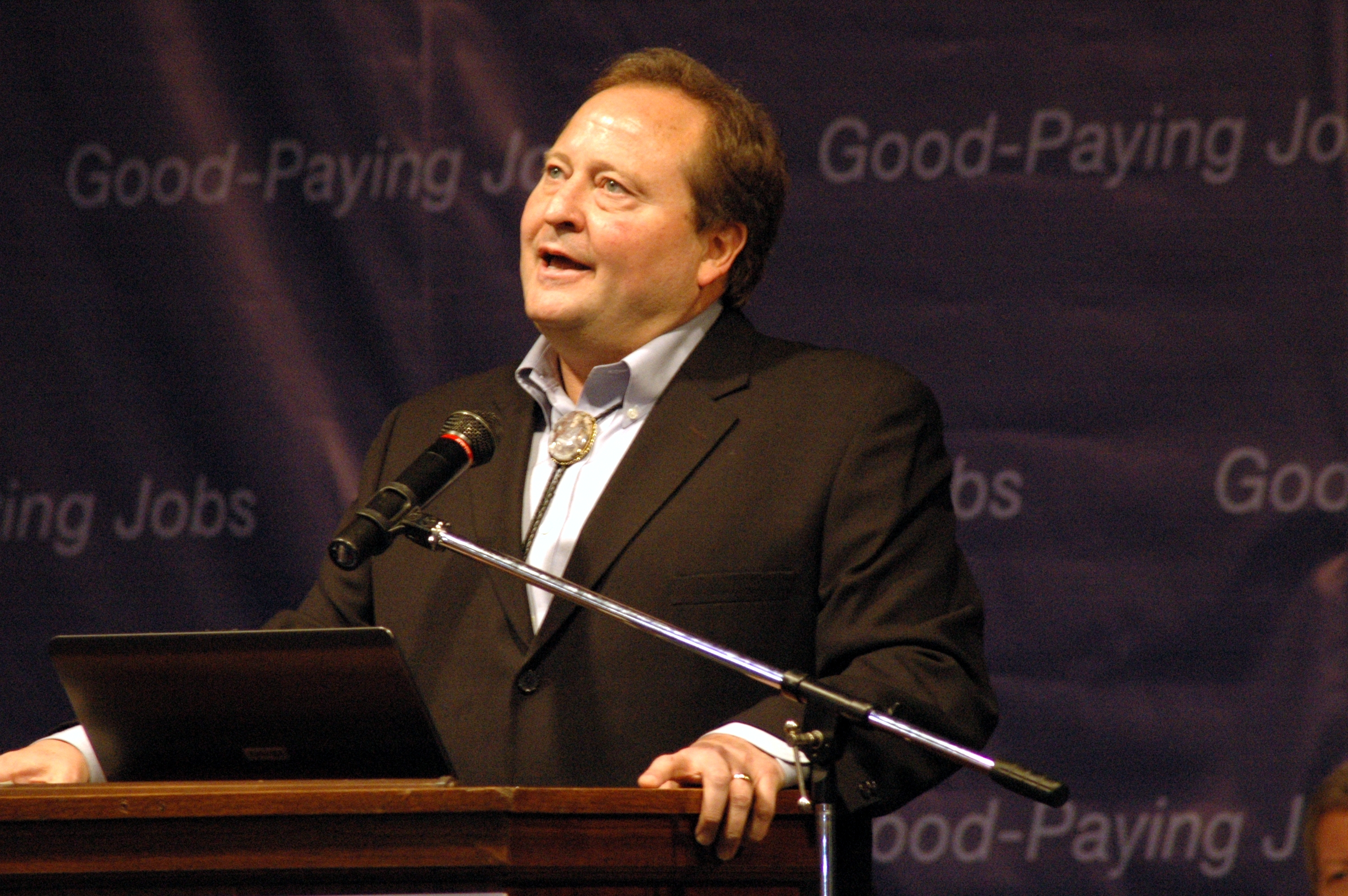
Democratic candidate Brian Schweitzer

In mid-summer, polls showed Schweitzer had a 10-point lead over Brown, but by October the gap had closed to only 4 percent.

Schweitzer campaigned with plans to lift Montana from its position at the bottom of all 50 states in wages. He called for new uses to be found for crops like mint, and for small businesses to pool in purchasing health care. He supported opening the border with Canada to allow consumers to get cheaper prescription drugs from Canada.

Brown said that the Democrats harmed business growth and job creation. He touted his government experience, including 26 years in the Montana legislature, and accused Schweitzer of taking hypocritical stands.

Schweitzer won the election, to become the first Democrat in 20 years to win an election for Montana governor. According to the exit polls, Schweitzer obtained two-thirds of the vote from over-65s and from independent voters. This was despite President George W. Bush winning Montana very easily over John Kerry.

=== Predictions ===
Source	Ranking	As of
Sabato's Crystal Ball	Lean D (flip)	November 1, 2004

=== Polling ===
Poll source	Date(s) administered	Sample size	Margin of error	Bob Brown (R)	Brian Schweitzer (D)	Other	Undecided
Mason-Dixon	October 18–20, 2004	625 (LV)	± 4.0%	43%	48%	2% (Note: Bob Kelleher (G) & Stan Jones (L) with 1%)	7%
MSU Billings	October 7–10, 2004	411 (LV)	± 5.0%	28%	43%	2%	27%
Mason-Dixon	September 20–22, 2004	625 (RV)	± 4.0%	41%	45%	1% (Note: Stan Jones (L) with 1%; Bob Kelleher (G) with 0%)	13%
Mason-Dixon	May 24–26, 2004	625 (RV)	± 4.0%	35%	45%	–	20%
Mason-Dixon	December 8–10, 2003	625 (RV)	± 4.0%	39%	42%	–	19%
Mason-Dixon	May 2003	–	–	40%	38%	–	22%

Hypothetical polling

Pat Davison vs. Brian Schweitzer

Poll source	Date(s) administered	Sample size	Margin of error	Pat Davison (R)	Brian Schweitzer (D)	Other	Undecided
Mason-Dixon	May 24–26, 2004	625 (RV)	± 4.0%	31%	47%	–	22%
Mason-Dixon	December 8–10, 2003	625 (RV)	± 4.0%	27%	45%	–	28%

Ken Miller vs. Brian Schweitzer

Poll source	Date(s) administered	Sample size	Margin of error	Ken Miller (R)	Brian Schweitzer (D)	Other	Undecided
Mason-Dixon	May 24–26, 2004	625 (RV)	± 4.0%	29%	49%	–	22%
Mason-Dixon	December 8–10, 2003	625 (RV)	± 4.0%	26%	43%	–	31%

Tom Keating vs. Brian Schweitzer

Poll source	Date(s) administered	Sample size	Margin of error	Tom Keating (R)	Brian Schweitzer (D)	Other	Undecided
Mason-Dixon	December 8–10, 2003	625 (RV)	± 4.0%	27%	44%	–	29%

Rob Natelson vs. Brian Schweitzer

Poll source	Date(s) administered	Sample size	Margin of error	Rob Natelson (R)	Brian Schweitzer (D)	Other	Undecided
Mason-Dixon	December 8–10, 2003	625 (RV)	± 4.0%	31%	46%	–	23%

Bob Brown vs. John Vincent

Poll source	Date(s) administered	Sample size	Margin of error	Bob Brown (R)	John Vincent (D)	Other	Undecided
Mason-Dixon	May 24–26, 2004	625 (RV)	± 4.0%	39%	30%	–	31%

Pat Davison vs. John Vincent

Poll source	Date(s) administered	Sample size	Margin of error	Pat Davison (R)	John Vincent (D)	Other	Undecided
Mason-Dixon	May 24–26, 2004	625 (RV)	± 4.0%	31%	30%	–	39%

Ken Miller vs. John Vincent

Poll source	Date(s) administered	Sample size	Margin of error	Ken Miller (R)	John Vincent (D)	Other	Undecided
Mason-Dixon	May 24–26, 2004	625 (RV)	± 4.0%	28%	34%	–	38%

== Results ==
2004 Montana gubernatorial election
Party	Candidate	Votes	%	±%
Democratic	Brian Schweitzer	225,016	50.44%	+3.35%
Republican	Bob Brown	205,313	46.02%	−4.97%
Green	Bob Kelleher	8,393	1.88%	N/A
Libertarian	Stanley Jones	7,424	1.66%	−0.27%
Total votes		446,146	100.00%	+11.2%
Democratic gain from Republican				

=== Counties that flipped from Republican to Democratic ===
- Cascade (largest city: Great Falls)
- Park (largest city: Livingston)
- Sheridan (largest city: Plentywood)
- Lake (largest city: Polson)
- Yellowstone (largest municipality: Billings)
- Valley (largest city: Glasgow)

== Notes ==
Partisan clients
