= Conrad Burns =

American politician (1935–2016)

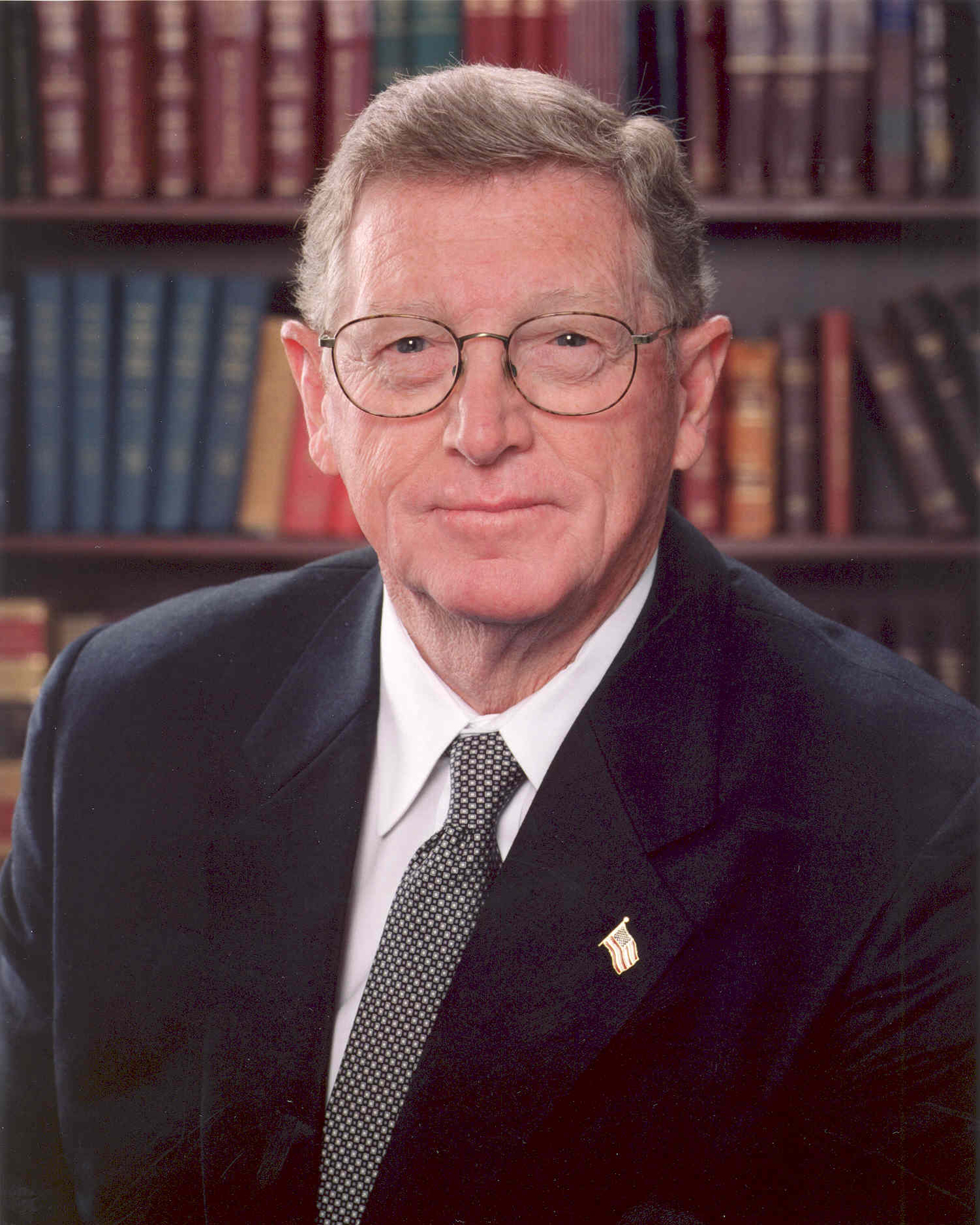
- Official portrait

United States Senator from Montana
- In office January 3, 1989 – January 3, 2007
- Preceded by: John Melcher
- Succeeded by: Jon Tester

Personal details
- Born: Conrad Ray Burns; January 25, 1935 Gallatin, Missouri, U.S.
- Died: April 28, 2016 (aged 81) Billings, Montana, U.S.
- Party: Republican
- Spouse: Phyllis Kuhlmann
- Children: 3
- Education: University of Missouri (attended)

Military service
- Branch/service: United States Marine Corps
- Years of service: 1955–1957
- Conrad Burns's voice Conrad Burns speaks on the CAN-SPAM Act of 2003; Recorded October 22, 2003

Conrad Ray Burns (January 25, 1935 – April 28, 2016) was an American politician and lobbyist who served as a United States senator from Montana from 1989 to 2007. He was only the second Republican popularly elected to represent Montana in the Senate and was the longest-serving Republican senator in Montana history.

While in the Senate, Burns sat on the Senate Appropriations Committee and was the chairman of its Subcommittee on the Interior. He was also chairman of the Commerce, Science, and Transportation Committee's Communications subcommittee.

== Early life ==
Burns was born on a farm near Gallatin, Missouri, to Russell and Mary Frances (Knight) Burns. He graduated from Gallatin High School in 1952 and then enrolled in the College of Agriculture at the University of Missouri. He was also a member of the Alpha Gamma Rho fraternity. Two years later Burns left without graduating and enlisted in the Marine Corps in 1955. He served in Japan and Korea as a small-arms instructor.

After his military service in 1957, Burns began working for Trans World Airlines and Ozark Air Lines. In 1962, he traveled the state of Montana as a field representative for Polled Hereford World magazine in Billings, He married Phyllis Jean Kuhlmann in 1967; they had three children, Kate, Keely, and Garrett.

In 1968, he turned down a transfer to Iowa and became a cattle auctioneer for the Billings Livestock Commission. He became the first manager of the Northern International Livestock Exposition. He also began reporting on agricultural market news, started a radio show and later working as a farm reporter for KULR-TV.

In 1975, Burns founded the Northern Agricultural Network with four radio stations. The NAN had grown to serve thirty-one radio stations and six television stations by 1986, when he sold it to enter politics. Angry at a local politician, he won a seat on the Yellowstone County Commission, where he served for two years.

== U.S. Senate elections ==
=== 1988 ===
Though a political novice, Burns had a great deal of name recognition from his previous jobs, and the Republican Party recruited him to run against incumbent Democratic Senator John Melcher, a popular veterinarian. Burns portrayed Melcher as "a liberal who is soft on drugs, soft on defense and very high on social programs." At the time a strong supporter of term limits, Burns said Melcher had been in Washington, D.C., too long. Melcher was also hurt by public opposition to policies in Yellowstone National Park regarding naturally occurring fires and by President Ronald Reagan's pocket veto of Melcher's bill, which would have made 1.4 million acres (5,700 km^{2}) of Montana forest off-limits to logging and mineral development. Burns defeated Melcher by 13,636 votes. He was helped by the success in Montana of Vice President George H. W. Bush, the Republican presidential nominee.

=== 1994 ===
Former Senator Melcher was among the candidates in the Democratic primary, but that race was won by Jack Mudd, former dean of the University of Montana law school in Missoula.

Burns was reelected by 86,697 votes over Mudd, whose campaign observers described as "underfunded and puzzling".

=== 2000 ===
Burns faced an unexpectedly difficult reelection campaign in 2000. In February 1999, he announced that he would break his 1988 promise to hold office for only two terms, saying, "Circumstances have changed, and I have rethought my position." Later that same month, while giving a speech about American dependence on foreign oil to the Montana Equipment Dealers Association, he referred to Arabs as "ragheads." Burns soon apologized, saying that he "became too emotionally involved" during the speech.

The Democratic nominee was Brian Schweitzer, a rancher from Whitefish, Montana. While Burns attempted to link Schweitzer with presidential candidate Al Gore, whom Schweitzer had never met, Schweitzer "effectively portrayed himself as nonpolitical." Schweitzer challenged Burns primarily on the issue of prescription drugs, organizing busloads of senior citizens to take trips to Canada and Mexico for cheaper medicine. Burns charged that Schweitzer favored "Canadian-style government controls" and claimed that senior citizens went to doctors to have "somebody to visit with. There's nothing wrong with them." Burns also faced trouble regarding deaths from asbestos in Libby, Montana. While he initially supported a bill to limit compensation in such cases, he withdrew his support for the bill under public criticism and added $11.5 million for the town to an appropriations bill.

Burns spent twice as much money as Schweitzer on the election and defeated him by only 13,652 votes, while the state voted for Republican presidential nominee George W. Bush by 103,052 votes. Schweitzer was elected Governor of Montana in 2004.

In December 2003, Burns and Senator Ron Wyden, an Oregon Democrat, were pleased that their legislation to combat spam, the CAN-SPAM Act, had been signed into law. Burns said, "Senator Wyden and I have worked during this time to come up with common-sense legislation to deal with spam and I think we've been successful." But in April 2005 anti-spam organization Spamhaus indicated that they were far from satisfied that the problem of spam coming from the U.S. had been addressed. Spamhaus head Steve Linford said, "Until America makes changes, everyone will still be plastered with spam."

In mid-2006, Burns told the Associated Press, which was doing an article on Congressional caucuses, that he had joined the Sweetener Caucus at the behest of sugar beet growers in his state. "I don't think I've ever attended," Burns said of caucus meetings. "I do what my growers tell me. I know we grow a lot of sugar beets in Montana."

=== 2006 ===
Because of his narrow win in 2000, the Democratic turnover over of Montana's state government in 2004, polls in 2006 putting his support in the state at around 40 percent, and high disapproval ratings from the Jack Abramoff scandal, Burns was considered one of the most vulnerable senators facing reelection in 2006.

On June 6, 2006, Burns easily won the Republican primary. In the November general election, his Democratic opponent was Montana State Senate President and organic farmer Jon Tester. In early August, CQPolitics changed its rating on the race from "Leans Republican" to "No Clear Favorite." According to some polls, Burns's approval rating had fallen as low as 39 percent, lower than any other U.S. Senator's.

Since at least August, the Montana Democratic Party had paid staffer Kevin O'Brien to follow Burns around the nation. O'Brien filmed the senator at all his public events, including Senate committee hearings and campaign appearances. These tapes' contents were used for a variety of press releases and even a YouTube music video. During the 2000 race against Schweitzer, cameraman Matt McKenna had been paid to trail Burns. McKenna worked as a spokesman for the Tester campaign.

In an October election debate with Tester, regarding the Iraq War, Burns said that Tester "says our president doesn't have a plan. I think he's got one. He's not going to tell everyone in the world", and later told Tester, "We're not going to tell you what our plan is, Jon, because you're just going to go out and blow it."

On November 9, 2006, Burns conceded the election to Tester. On November 15, he angrily responded to questions about his remaining time as a lame-duck senator, saying, "I'm not going to negotiate my problems with the goddamn press... Goodbye! Goodbye! Goodbye!"

== Congressional record ==
=== Overall ===
In April 2006, Time magazine named Burns one of America's Five Worst Senators. It dubbed him "The Shock Jock" and called him "serially offensive" for his many controversial statements, such as a 1999 remark in which he called Arabs "ragheads." The magazine also criticized his "meager" legislative record and his legal problems involving Jack Abramoff. Burns's ratings from interest groups indicate a conservative Republican voting record. According to Project Vote Smart, Burns's rating by major think tanks and political action committees were as follows:

- NARAL Pro-Choice America: 0%
- National Right to Life Committee: 100%
- American Conservative Union: 91%
- American Civil Liberties Union: 0%
- U.S. Chamber of Commerce: 94%
- National Education Association: 0%
- League of Conservation Voters: 5%
- Christian Coalition of America: 100%
- Cato Institute: 70%
- NRA Political Victory Fund: A
- American Public Health Association: 10%
- American Land Rights Association: 100%
- AFL–CIO: 29%
- National Taxpayers Union: 67%

Burns was also well known for his ability to obtain appropriations for his home state.

=== First term ===
After the passage of the Civil Rights Act of 1991, Burns invited a group of racially mixed lobbyists to a "slave auction." Following criticism, Burns responded that in such events "you have an auction and you sell the kids and they perform a day's work for whoever buys them" and said they were "rather common in Montana."

=== Second term ===
During a visit to the Bozeman Daily Chronicle, Burns told one of the editors an anecdote about an elderly Montana rancher who asked him about life in Washington. The rancher asked "Conrad, how can you live back there with all those niggers?" and Burns replied that it was "a hell of a challenge." After his remarks were criticized, Burns issued an apology, saying, "Such views are inappropriate and belong in the past and that was the context in which the story was told...they are views which I do not condone and do not share." But when asked why he did not condemn the term when he heard it, Burns replied, "I don't know, I never give it much thought."

== Post-Senate career ==
After leaving office, Burns joined the lobbying firm of GAGE, founded by his former chief of staff, Leo Giacometto. He also founded Rural Solutions Corporation, a communications company that expands broadband communications in rural areas, and maintained his auction business. In February 2008, Burns registered as a lobbyist for the American Quarter Horse Association.

On December 9, 2009, Burns was hospitalized after suffering from a stroke, likely as a result of atrial fibrillation, at his Arlington, Virginia home. He was taken to Virginia Hospital Center before being transferred to the intensive-care unit of a Washington, D.C. hospital. He stayed at National Rehabilitation Hospital and then returned home to Montana.

In 2012, Burns endorsed Congressman Denny Rehberg in his Senate bid against Jon Tester. Rehberg's bid failed, and Tester was reelected. Burns died in Billings, Montana on April 28, 2016, at the age of 81.

== Ethics and notable incidents ==
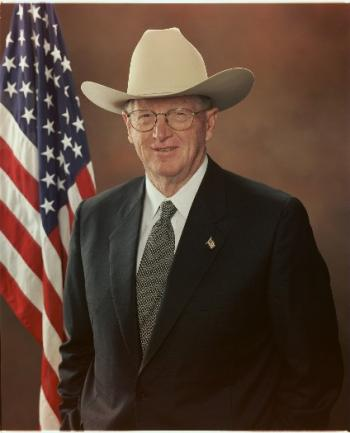
Conrad Burns senate photo, c. 2000.

In September 2006, the Citizens for Responsibility and Ethics in Washington (CREW) released its second annual report on the most corrupt members of Congress, titled "Beyond DeLay: The 20 Most Corrupt Members of Congress (and five to watch)." Burns was included as one of the 20 most corrupt members of Congress after having also been listed in the first annual report. The organization said, "His ethics issues stem from campaign contributions he accepted in apparent exchange for exercising his authority as chairman of an appropriations subcommittee and on a trip some of his staff members took to the 2001 Super Bowl."

=== Abramoff and tribal contributions ===
Burns had accepted about $150,000 in contributions from Jack Abramoff and his clients and associates. He later gave that money away after Democrats criticized his connections to the lobbyist. Two of Burns's staffers also later worked for Abramoff. In early 2008, the Justice Department notified Burns that he was no longer part of their investigation.

==== Contributions and connections ====
Between 2001 and 2004, while chair of the Interior Subcommittee on Appropriations, Burns received nearly $150,000 in campaign contributions from lobbyist Jack Abramoff, Abramoff's clients and other donors connected to Abramoff. According to a 2006 report by PoliticalMoneyLine.com, published in Roll Call, Burns received $192,090 in campaign contributions from tribal entities between 2001 and 2005. In addition, a friend of Abramoff's said in October 2006 that Burns's staff ate so many free meals at Abramoff's restaurant that people joked they would have "starved to death" without the lobbyist. Burns later returned the money.

In December 2005, a leader of a tribe that gave Burns $22,000 in campaign contributions in 2002 said the tribe had done so solely at Abramoff's request and believed the senator was part of "Abramoff's group." In a 2006 Vanity Fair article, Abramoff was quoted as saying, "Every appropriation we wanted from Senator Conrad Burns' committee we got." Burns denied that he was influenced by Abramoff.

Beginning in 2001, Mark Baker, a former Burns aide who was the chief lobbyist for the Confederated Salish and Kootenai Tribes in 2003 and 2004 and the Burns 2006 campaign chairman donated $9,000 to Burns and his Friends of the Big Sky Leadership PAC. Baker is also affiliated with the DC lobbying firm Denny Miller Associates Inc., whose members donated at least $27,000 to Burns and his PAC during the same period.

==== Tribal school ====
In January 2003, an attempt by the two senators from Michigan to get money for a school of the Saginaw Chippewa Tribe of Michigan, an Abramoff client and one of the wealthiest tribes in the country (each member gets $70,000 per year from gambling profits), was unsuccessful. The Bureau of Indian Affairs said the tribe's school wasn't eligible, based on the authorizing statute for the program. The tribe, and Abramoff, its lobbyist, then began working with Burns. Abramoff's lobbying team had strong connections with Burns's staff. Among their ranks was Shawn Vasell, an Appropriations aide who shuttled back and forth between jobs on Burns's staff and Abramoff's shop. Ryan Thomas, another Burns appropriations staffer, and Burns's chief of staff, Will M. Brooke, were treated to a trip to the 2001 Super Bowl in Florida on a corporate jet leased by Abramoff's team.

In May 2003, Burns and his counterpart, Charles Taylor, the chairman of the House Interior Subcommittee, sent a letter to the Interior Department, arguing the Saginaw Chippewa's case. But the department and the bureau remained firm in their refusal. In late October 2003, just before the final vote on the Interior appropriations bill, Burns inserted a paragraph at the request of the Michigan Senators – an earmark – in the bill's conference report. It lifted previous restrictions and directed that the Saginaw Chippewa Indians be given $3 million for their tribal school.

The tribe donated $32,000 to Burns from 2001 to 2003.

==== National Bison Range ====
In the 1990s, Burns opposed the transfer of management of the National Bison Range (NBR) in Moiese, Montana, to the Confederated Salish and Kootenai Tribes (CSKT), introduced a draft bill opposing tribal jurisdiction, and supported Senator Slade Gorton's S. 1691, which called Tribal Sovereign Immunity into question. At the time, Burns said that tribal sovereign immunity interfered with citizens' Fifth Amendment rights.

In 2001 and 2002, Burns's policies changed, and his DC staff told citizens of western Montana that he would not support any legislation concerning tribal government unless all 500+ tribes agree to it.

In 2003, the CSKT renewed negotiations over the NBR. Officials from the United States Fish and Wildlife Service in Denver stated at the time that Burns had the authority to stop the management transfer. On March 14, 2005, the day before a new NBR agreement went into effect with the tribes, CSKT chairman Fred Matt wrote in a Missoulian guest column, "Sen. Burns has been a positive and aggressive advocate for Indian Country..." and "Burns fully understands and appreciates consultation with Indian country, our sovereignty, and our right to self-determination".

==== Involvement of staffers and aides ====
Less than two months after a key earmark by Burns in October 2003, Burns's chief of staff, Will Brooke, went to work for Abramoff at the lobbying firm Greenberg Traurig.

In June 2005, former Burns staffer Shawn Vasell was called as a witness at a hearing before the Senate Committee on Indian Affairs. Vasell was registered as a lobbyist for the Choctaw and Coushatta tribes in 2001, joined Burns's staff in 2002, then rejoined Abramoff's team as a lobbyist for the tribes in 2003. He refused to testify, citing his Fifth Amendment right against self-incrimination.

Mark Baker, a former legislative director for Burns, and Burns's 2006 campaign chairman, was paid $60,000 to be the chief lobbyist for the Confederated Salish and Kootenai Tribes in 2003 and 2004. Working through his Helena firm, Anderson and Baker, Baker also made $120,000 lobbying for the CSKT business venture S&K Technologies during those same years, and another $40,000 working for the CSKT through the Giacometto Group. Leo Giacometto was Burns's chief of staff from 1995 to 1999.

==== Returning of "tainted" campaign contributions ====
Burns returned the entirety of Abramoff's personal donations to charity. When possible, Burns returned contributions to the tribes where they originated.

His attempt to make a $111,000 donation to the Montana-Wyoming Tribal Leaders Council was rejected; the council said the money was tainted because it originally came from Abramoff and his clients. Julia Doney, president of the Fort Belknap Indian Community Council and a member of the tribal leaders council, said that the tribes are "tired of being used" and didn't want to help Burns with his political troubles.

The Blackfeet Community College also refused to accept money from Burns because it came from Jack Abramoff. James St. Goddard, a Blackfeet council member, told the Great Falls Tribune that taking the money "would have made it look like the money is clean. We do not want Mr. Burns to use the tribes any more for his political gain."

=== Inland Northwest Space Alliance ===
In May 2006, a University of Montana spinoff that had federal funding of more than $4 million, through efforts by Burns, became part of an investigation by the NASA Office of Inspector General. In 2004 the Inland Northwest Space Alliance, a nonprofit company, paid $270,000 to a software company, Compressus, for "project management," via a no-bid contract. In the same year, Compressus paid $220,000 in lobbying fees to the firm of Burns's former chief of staff Leo Giacometto; INSA also paid Giacometto $20,000 in fees that year. Burns's daughter, Keely Burns, was invited to join the INSA board, but said she had no involvement other than attending organizational meetings. She also served on Compressus's board of advisers for a year. In 2005, Giacometto was the lobbyist for the University of Montana, for which he was paid $79,750.

In October 2006, the Missoulian reported further problems with IMSA and with the University of Montana's Northern Rockies Center for Space Privatization, which has a history of sharing employees with INSA, some of whom are related.

Earlier in October 2006, the Washington D.C. newspaper Roll Call reported that Montana legislative auditors gave the FBI evidence not included in their June report indicating "there was clear criminal activity" involved in the alliance between INSA, Burns and Giacometto. State officials say Roll Call's report was incorrect. "I have talked with an FBI agent and an investigator with the NASA Office of Inspector General," Missoula County Attorney Fred Van Valkenburg said. "They are doing some interviewing of witnesses and have not completed their work. Until they do, I won't proceed any further."

=== Comments about firefighters ===
In July 2006, Burns serendipitously met up with a group of firefighters waiting for their flight home at the Billings airport. According to a state report, he told the firefighters that they had done a "piss-poor job." They had been working to put out a 92,000-acre (372 km^{2}) fire near Billings. Burns had earlier been speaking with some local ranchers who were unhappy about the way the firefighters had done their job. According to a spokesperson, Burns had not yet spoken about this with anyone in authority in the fire service, or heard a firefighter's point of view.

The Billings Gazette reported, "U.S. Senator Conrad Burns pointed across the Billings airport Sunday and accused a member of an elite firefighting team of not doing 'a God damned thing' and charged that crew members just 'sit around' on the job, the original version of a state report said."

Burns was also surprised when told by an employee of the Montana Department of Natural Resources and Conservation that the firefighters in question made about $8–12/hour.

On August 14, 2006, a reporter from the Daily Press of Newport News, Virginia called Burns's office for comment on the firefighter remark. A young staffer who answered, erroneously believing the reporter to be a friend, proceeded with a host of obscenity-laced comments not intended for public consumption. The aide at one point even allegedly said, "...you can tell Senator George Allen of Virginia to [vulgarity deleted]." The Democratic Party called on Burns to apologize.

=== Immigration comments ===
During a debate in 2006 against Democratic opponent Jon Tester, Burns commented that he was on the telephone with his contractor when he saw an interview with an illegal immigrant on television. The immigrant featured in the interview said he was a roofer and was headed north. Burns said that he told the contractor, "You better go out and get your help or you won't get my house roofed."

At a June meeting, Burns said "The other day, the little fella who does our maintenance work around the house, he's from Guatemala, and I said, 'Could I see your green card?' And Hugo says, 'No.' I said, 'Oh gosh.'" (Burns spokesman Jason Klindt said the worker was in the United States legally, owned a painting company, and that Burns "never had any doubt" that he was a legal resident.)

In August, at a campaign event, Burns interrupted his speech to take a cellphone call. After speaking a bit and hanging up, he told the audience, "Hugo is a nice little Guatemalan man who is doing some painting for me ... in Virginia." After some laughter from the audience, Burns said "No, he's terrific, love him."

=== Taxicab terrorists ===
On August 25, 2006, at a campaign event in Miles City, Burns said of the military: "We thank God for those young people that do it every day and every night to fight this enemy that's a taxicab driver in the daytime but a killer at night."

Burns went on to repeat his "taxicab driver" analogy several times over the next few days. On August 27, 2006, in Butte, Burns said, "This campaign is about the next generation; it is if we have a safe world and a secure world where our kids can go to bed at night and not worry about a guy that drives a taxicab in the daytime and kills at night."

Again, at a campaign event on August 30, 2006, Burns, while discussing the war on terrorism, spoke of a "faceless enemy" of terrorists who "drive taxicabs in the daytime and kill at night."

A spokesman for Burns's campaign said, "The point is there are terrorists that live amongst us. Not only here, but in Britain and the entire world. Whether they are taxi drivers or investment bankers, the fact remains that this is a new type of enemy."

=== Untoward editing of Wikipedia ===
In February 2006, it was reported that an unidentified member of Burns's staff had sought to remove from his Wikipedia biography pejorative comments Burns had made and replace them "glowing" praise as "the voice of the farmer". The edits were detected by Wikinews editors and later reported in the press.

== Death ==
Burns died on April 28, 2016, of complications from a stroke. He was interred in Arlington National Cemetery on July 17, 2017.

Party political offices
Preceded by Larry Williams	Republican nominee for U.S. Senator from Montana (Class 1); 1988, 1994, 2000, 2006	Succeeded by Denny Rehberg
U.S. Senate
Preceded by John Melcher	U.S. Senator (Class 1) from Montana; 1989–2007; Served alongside: Max Baucus	Succeeded by Jon Tester
