= John Melcher =

American politician (1924–2018)

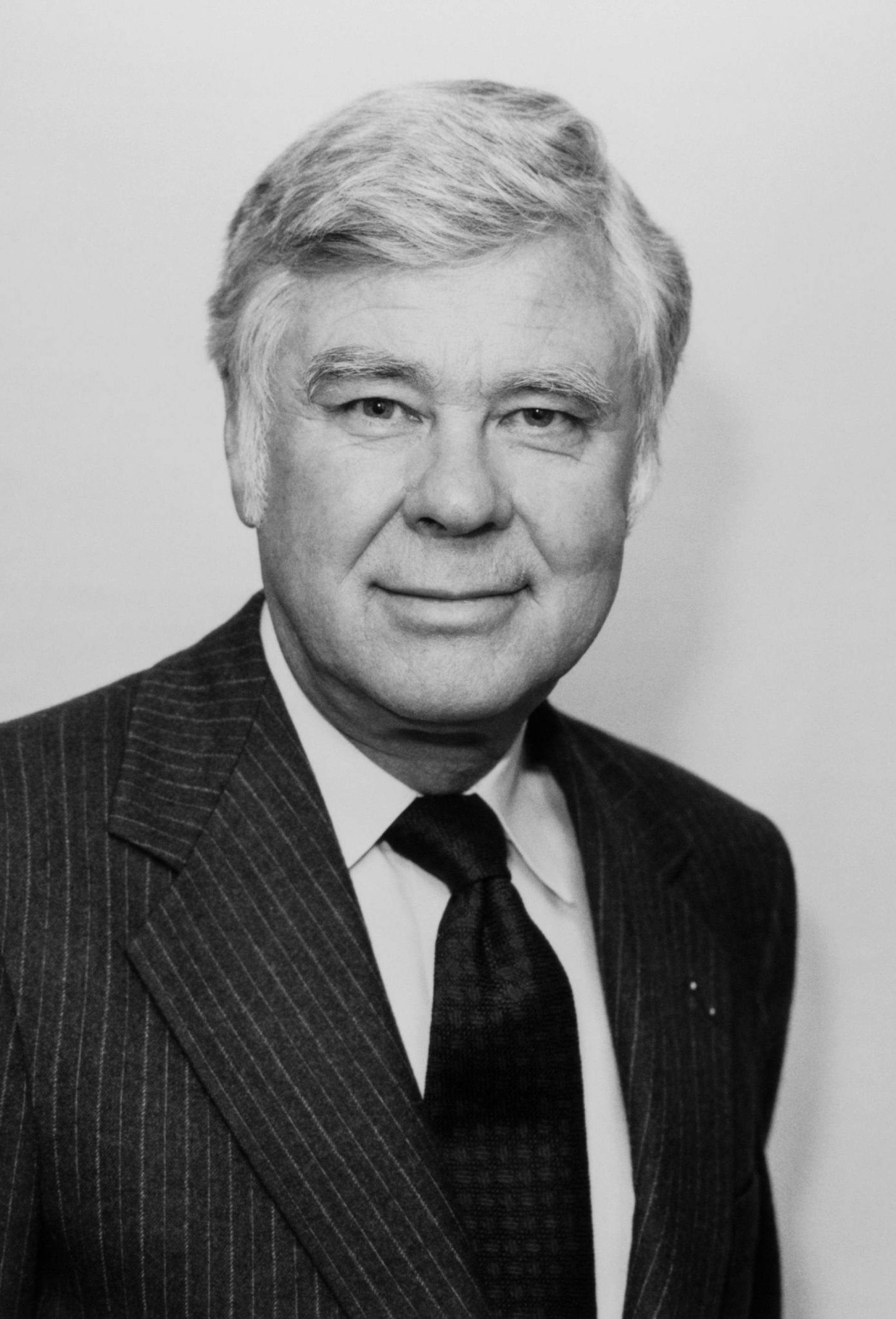
- Official portrait, 1983

United States Senator from Montana
- In office January 3, 1977 – January 3, 1989
- Preceded by: Mike Mansfield
- Succeeded by: Conrad Burns

Member of the U.S. House of Representatives from Montana's 2nd district
- In office June 24, 1969 – January 3, 1977
- Preceded by: James F. Battin
- Succeeded by: Ron Marlenee

Personal details
- Born: John David Melcher; September 6, 1924 Sioux City, Iowa, U.S.
- Died: April 12, 2018 (aged 93) Missoula, Montana, U.S.
- Party: Democratic
- Education: University of Minnesota, Twin Cities; Iowa State University (BS, DVM)

Military service
- Allegiance: United States
- Branch/service: United States Army
- Years of service: 1943–1945
- Unit: 76th Infantry Division
- Battles/wars: World War II; Invasion of Normandy
- Awards: Bronze Star; Purple Heart; Combat Infantry Badge

John David Melcher (September 6, 1924 – April 12, 2018) was an American politician of the Democratic Party who represented Montana for four terms as a member of the United States House of Representatives from 1969 to 1977 and as a United States senator for two terms from 1977 until 1989.

== Early life ==
Melcher was born in Sioux City, Iowa; his paternal grandparents were from Germany. He attended the University of Minnesota before joining the military. He served in the United States Army during World War II, and participated in the D-Day Invasion of Normandy with the 76th Infantry Division in Europe during World War II. He was wounded in action in Germany and awarded the Purple Heart, Combat Infantryman's Badge and the Bronze Star.

Melcher married Ruth Klein in 1945. They had six children.

He graduated from Iowa State University in 1950. Later he moved to Forsyth, Montana, and established a veterinary clinic.

== Political career ==
Melcher served on the Forsyth City Council. He then served as mayor of Forsyth in 1955, for three terms. In 1960, he was elected to the Montana House of Representatives for Rosebud County.

In 1962, he was elected to the Montana Senate.

=== U.S. House of Representatives ===
He was elected to the United States House of Representatives by special election on June 24, 1969, to fill a vacancy created when the incumbent, Republican James F. Battin, resigned to accept an appointment to the Federal bench. Melcher was re-elected to the three succeeding Congresses and served from June 24, 1969, to January 3, 1977.

=== U.S. Senate ===
In 1976, he was elected to the United States Senate to succeed retiring Democratic incumbent Mike Mansfield.

Melcher was re-elected in 1982 against Republican Larry R. Williams. Melcher had been targeted by National Conservative Political Action Committee (NCPAC) as potentially vulnerable, and he was subjected to attack ads depicting him as "too liberal for Montana". Melcher's response became a classic of campaign advertising, featuring a shot of an "out-of-stater" carrying a briefcase full of money, followed by a conversation among several cows deploring their intervention in the race.

=== After Congress ===
His campaign for re-election in 1988 was unsuccessful; he was defeated by Republican Conrad Burns. Melcher attributed the loss to a lack of time spent campaigning. A wilderness management bill he co-sponsored was vetoed by President Ronald Reagan only days before the 1988 election.

Melcher was a candidate again for the same seat in the 1994 Senate election for an attempted rematch with Burns, but lost to Jack Mudd in the primary, who in turn was also defeated by Burns by 62% to 38%.

=== Political positions and legislative contributions ===
Melcher had generally liberal views on environmental issues, but was pro-life and supported prayer in public schools. He was a co-sponsor of the Surface Mining Control and Reclamation Act of 1977, which regulated coal strip mining.

Melcher was responsible in 1984 for an amendment to the Animal Welfare Act that required psychological well-being to be protected in primate research. This legislation was praised by Jane Goodall, and in 1987 he was the presenter to her of the Schweitzer Medal of the Animal Welfare Institute.

== Later life ==
After serving in the Senate, Melcher worked as a lobbyist for multiple organizations, including the American Veterinary Medical Association.

Melcher died on April 12, 2018, in Missoula, Montana, at the age of 93.

U.S. House of Representatives
Preceded by James F. Battin	Member of the U.S. House of Representatives from Montana's 2nd congressional district 1969–1977	Succeeded by Ron Marlenee
Party political offices
Preceded by Mike Mansfield	Response to the State of the Union address 1972; Served alongside: Carl Albert, Lloyd Bentsen, Hale Boggs, John Brademas, Frank Church, Thomas Eagleton, Martha Griffiths, Ralph Metcalfe, William Proxmire, Leonor Sullivan	Vacant Title next held by Mike Mansfield
Preceded by Mike Mansfield	Democratic nominee for U.S. Senator from Montana (Class 1); 1976, 1982, 1988	Succeeded by Jack Mudd
U.S. Senate
Preceded by Mike Mansfield	United States Senator (Class 1) from Montana; 1977–1989; Served alongside: Lee Metcalf, Paul Hatfield, Max Baucus	Succeeded by Conrad Burns
Preceded by James Abourezk	Chair of the Senate Indian Affairs Committee; 1979–1981	Succeeded by William Cohen
Preceded by John Heinz	Chair of the Senate Aging Committee; 1987–1989	Succeeded by David Pryor
