= Hereford World =

Trade magazine about the Hereford breed of cattle

- Cover of the September 2021 issue

Hereford World is a trade magazine about the Hereford breed of cattle. The magazine was formed in 1995 when Polled Hereford World merged with American Hereford Journal. The headquarters of Hereford World is in Kansas City, Missouri. It is published eleven times per year.
