= 1994 United States Senate election in Montana =

- November 8, 1994
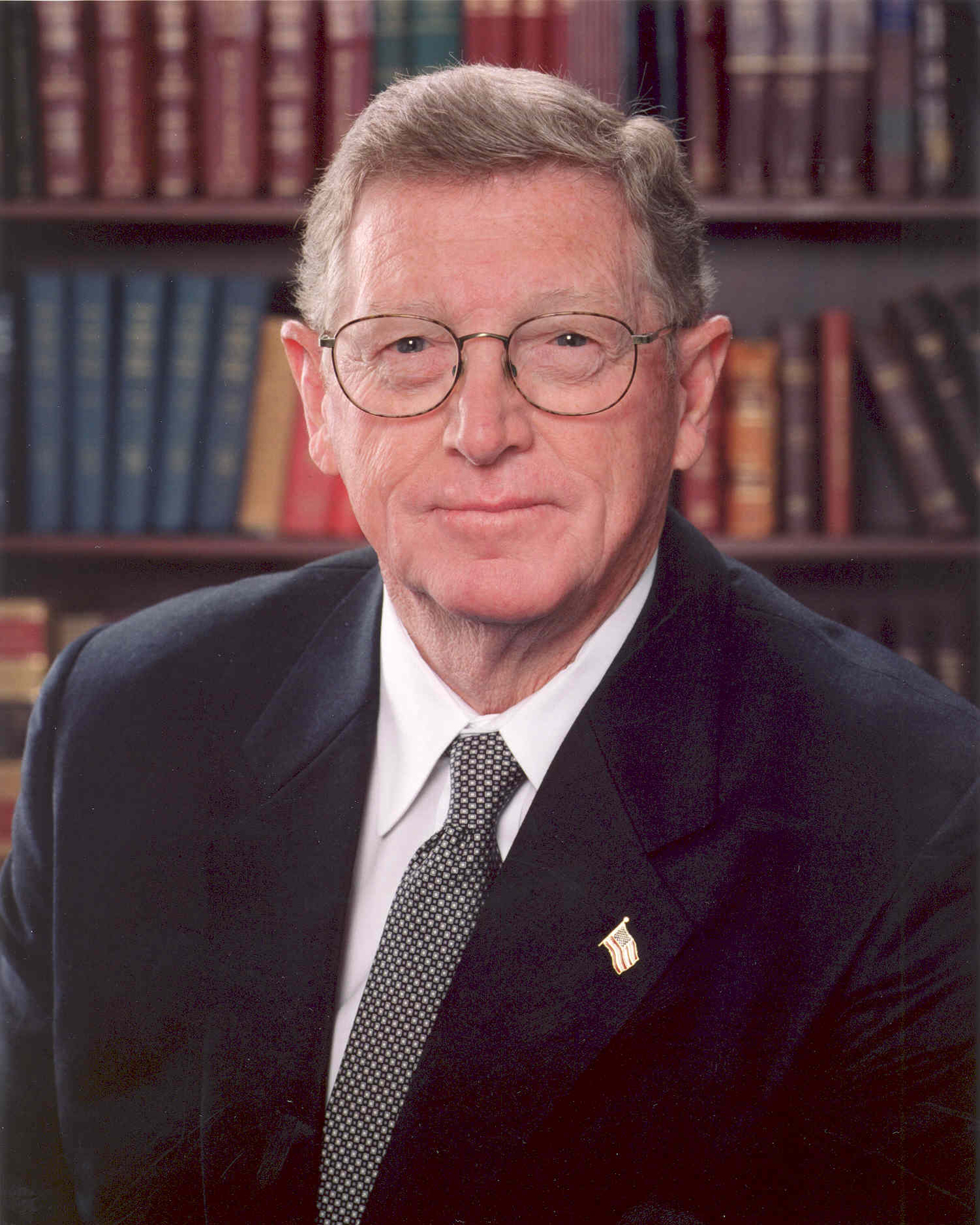

Nominee	Conrad Burns	Jack Mudd
Party	Republican	Democratic
Popular vote	218,542	131,845
Percentage	62.37%	37.63%
- County results Burns: 50–60% 60–70% 70–80% 80–90% >90% Mudd: 50–60%
U.S. senator before election
Conrad Burns
Republican
Elected U.S. Senator
Conrad Burns
Republican

The 1994 United States Senate election in Montana was held November 8, 1994 to select the U.S. Senator from the state of Montana. Incumbent U.S. Senator Conrad Burns won re-election to a second term. This was the first time a Republican senator ever won re-election in Montana. This was the strongest of Burns' four Senate elections, and the only one in which he won by more than five percentage points.

== Democratic primary ==
=== Candidates ===
- Jack Mudd, law professor
- John Melcher, former U.S. Senator
- Becky Shaw, student loan investigator

=== Results ===
Democratic primary results
Party	Candidate	Votes	%
Democratic	Jack Mudd	58,371	47.20
Democratic	John Melcher	39,607	32.03
Democratic	Becky Shaw	25,688	20.77
Total votes		123,666	100.00

== Republican primary ==
=== Candidates ===
- Conrad Burns, incumbent U.S. Senator

=== Results ===
Republican Party primary results
Party	Candidate	Votes	%
Republican	Conrad Burns (incumbent)	82,827	100.00
Total votes		82,827	100.00

== General election ==
=== Candidates ===
- Conrad Burns (R), incumbent U.S. Senator
- Jack Mudd (D), law professor

=== Polling ===
Source	Date	Burns (R)	Mudd (D)
Great Falls Tribune	September 16, 1994	46%	40%

=== Results ===
General election results
Party	Candidate	Votes	%	±%
Republican	Conrad Burns (incumbent)	218,542	62.37%	+10.50%
Democratic	Jack Mudd	131,845	37.63%	−10.50%
Majority		86,697	24.74%	+21.01%
Turnout		350,387		
Republican hold				

== See also ==
- 1994 United States Senate elections
