= 2000 United States Senate election in Montana =

- November 7, 2000
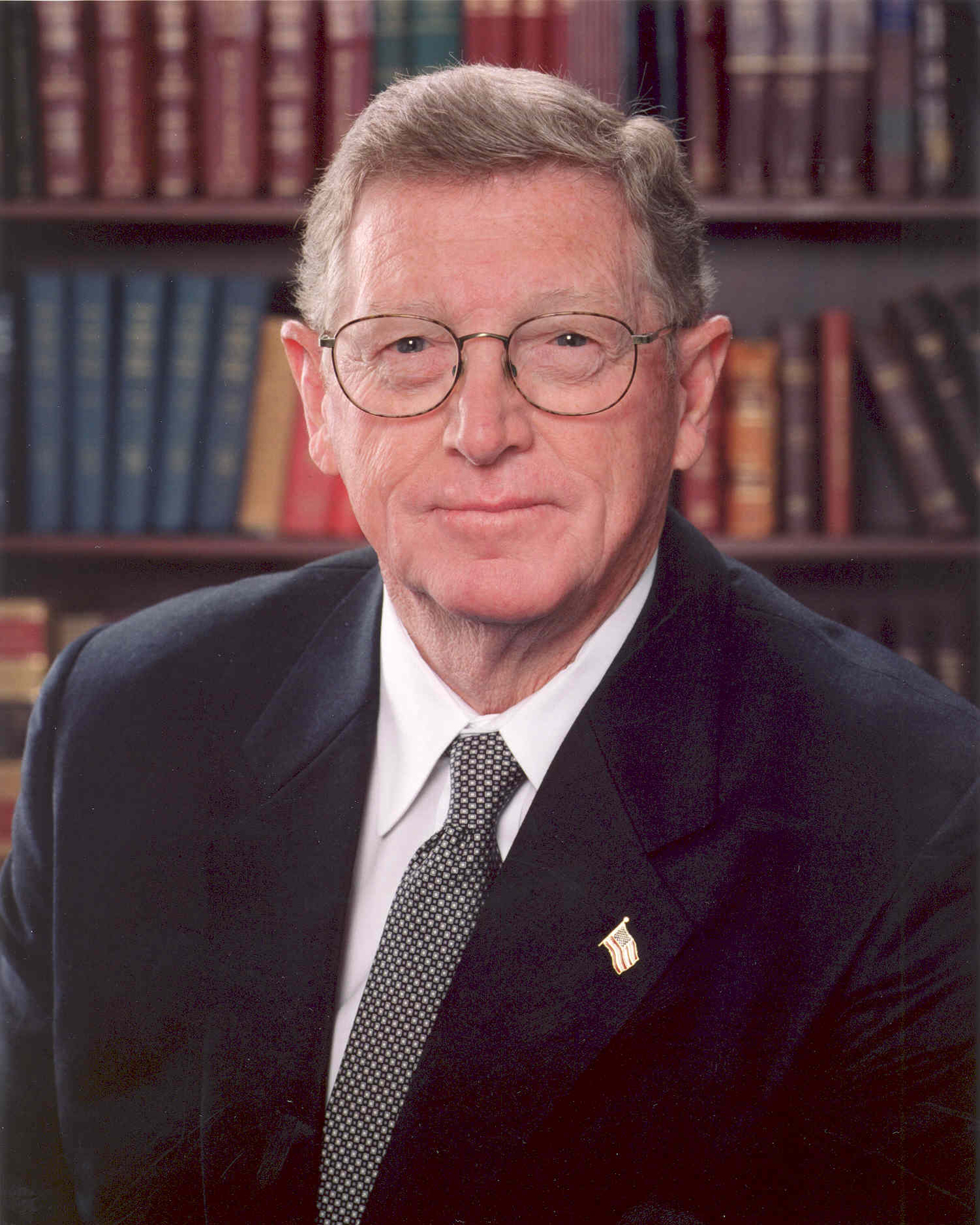

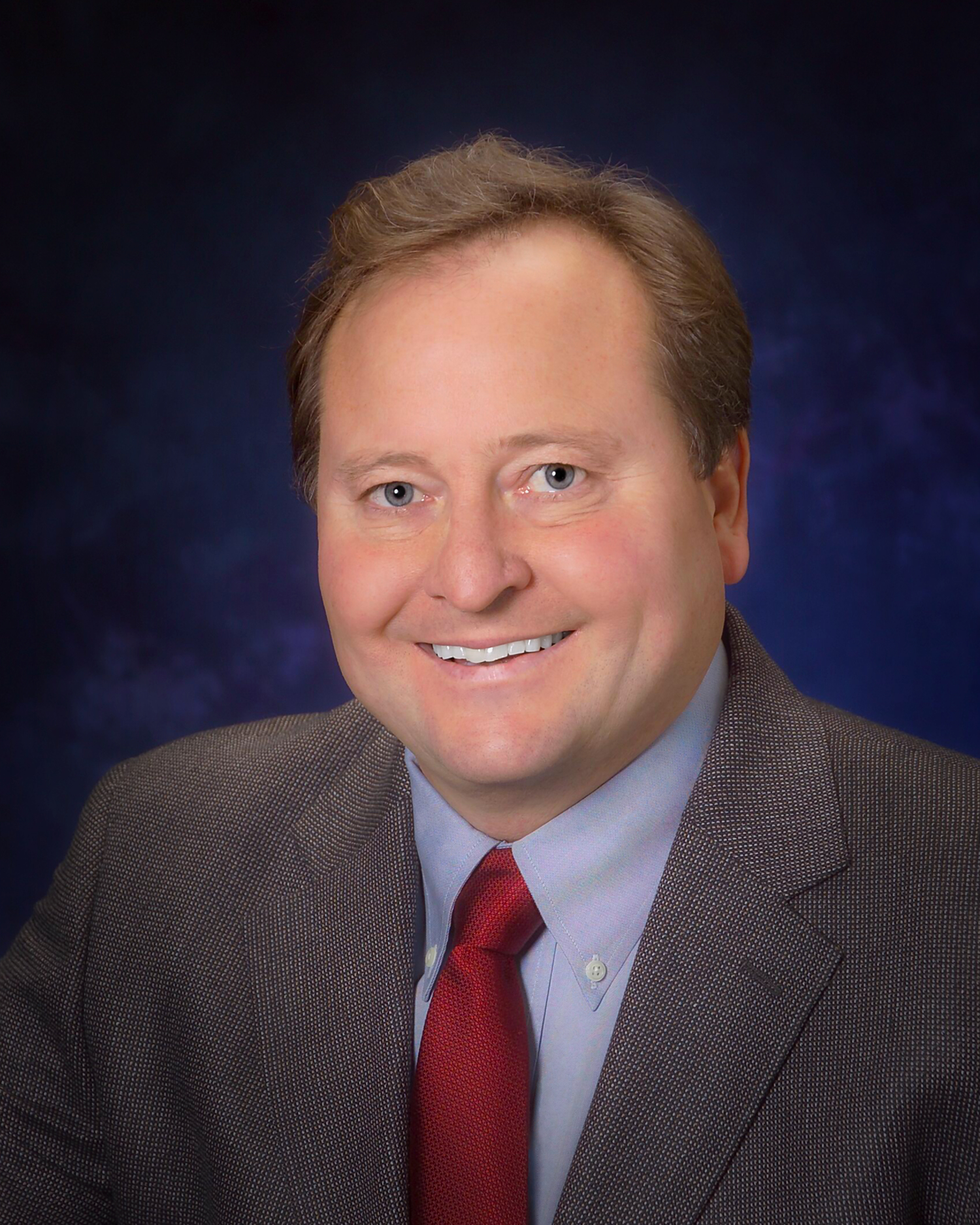
Nominee	Conrad Burns	Brian Schweitzer
Party	Republican	Democratic
Popular vote	208,082	194,430
Percentage	50.55%	47.24%
- County results Burns: 40–50% 50–60% 60–70% 70–80% 80–90% Schweitzer: 50–60% 60–70% 70–80%
U.S. senator before election
Conrad Burns
Republican
Elected U.S. Senator
Conrad Burns
Republican

The 2000 United States Senate election in Montana was held on November 7, 2000. Republican incumbent Conrad Burns was re-elected to a third term over Brian Schweitzer. This was the last time until 2024 where Republicans won the Class 1 Senate seat from Montana.

Brian Schweitzer, the Democratic Party nominee, would be elected governor four years later.

== Republican primary ==
=== Candidates ===
- Conrad Burns, incumbent U.S. senator since 1989

=== Results ===
Republican Party primary results
Party	Candidate	Votes	%
Republican	Conrad Burns (incumbent)	102,125	100.00
Total votes		102,125	100.00

== Democratic primary ==
=== Candidates ===
- John Driscoll, former speaker of the Montana House of Representatives
- Brian Schweitzer, Whitefish rancher and former U.S. Department of Agriculture employee

=== Results ===
Democratic Party primary results
Party	Candidate	Votes	%
Democratic	Brian Schweitzer	59,189	66.18
Democratic	John Driscoll	30,242	33.82
Total votes		89,431	100.00

== Reform primary ==
=== Candidates ===
- Sam Rankin

=== Results ===
Reform Party primary results
Party	Candidate	Votes	%
Reform	Sam Rankin	1,110	100.00
Total votes		1,110	100.00

== General election ==
=== Candidates ===
- Conrad Burns, incumbent U.S. senator since 1989 (Republican)
- Gary Lee (Reform)
- Brian Schweitzer, Whitefish rancher and former U.S. Department of Agriculture employee (Democratic)

Though Sam Rankin won the Reform Party's nomination for the United States Senate, he dropped out of the race over the summer and was replaced by Gary Lee.

=== Campaign ===
Burns, in a poll released September 21, was leading Schweitzer 48% to 39% that went down from 49% in November 1999. Schweitzer had his polls go up by 11 points.

Burns faced a surprisingly difficult reelection campaign in 2000. In February 1999, he announced that he would break his 1988 promise to only hold office for two terms, claiming "Circumstances have changed, and I have rethought my position." Later that same month, while giving a speech about U.S. dependence on foreign oil to the Montana Equipment Dealers Association, he referred to Arabs as "ragheads". Burns soon apologized, saying he "became too emotionally involved" during the speech.

Burns faced Brian Schweitzer, a rancher from Whitefish, Montana. While Burns attempted to link Schweitzer with presidential candidate Al Gore, whom Schweitzer never met, Schweitzer "effectively portrayed himself as nonpolitical". Schweitzer primarily challenged Burns on the issue of prescription drugs, organizing busloads of senior citizens to take trips to Canada and Mexico for cheaper medicine. Burns charged that Schweitzer favored "Canadian-style government controls" and claimed that senior citizens went to doctors to have "somebody to visit with. There's nothing wrong with them." Burns also faced trouble regarding deaths from asbestos in Libby, Montana. While he initially supported a bill to limit compensation in such cases, he withdrew his support for the bill, under public criticism, and added $11.5 million for the town to an appropriations bill.

Burns spent twice as much money as Schweitzer on the election and only defeated him by a slim margin, 51% to 47%, while the state voted 58% to 33% for Republican presidential nominee George W. Bush. Schweitzer went on to become governor in 2005.

=== Debates ===
- Complete video of debate, October 10, 2000
- Complete video of debate, October 16, 2000
- Complete video of debate, October 21, 2000

=== Polling ===
Poll source	Date(s)	Sample size	Margin of error	Conrad Burns (R)	Brian Schweitzer (D)	Other / undecided (Note: Calculated by taking the difference of 100% and all other candidates combined.)
Mason-Dixon Polling & Strategy	October 24, 2000	628	—	45%	44%	11%
Montana State University Billings	October 21, 2000	403	—	41%	43%	16%
Rasmussen Reports	October 19, 2000	968	—	51%	41%	8%

=== Results ===
General election results
Party	Candidate	Votes	%	±%
Republican	Conrad Burns (incumbent)	208,082	50.55%	−11.82%
Democratic	Brian Schweitzer	194,430	47.24%	+9.61%
Reform	Gary Lee	9,089	2.2%	
Majority		13,652	3.32%	−21.43%
Turnout		411,601		
Republican hold		Swing		

==== Counties that flipped from Republican to Democratic ====
- Blaine (largest city: Chinooko)
- Cascade (largest city: Great Falls)
- Hill (largest city: Havre)
- Lewis and Clark (largest city: Helena)
- Rosebud (largest city: Colstrip)
- Big Horn (largest city: Hardin)
- Glacier (largest city: Cut Bank)
- Roosevelt (largest city: Wolf Point)

== See also ==
- 2000 United States Senate elections
