= Bob Brown (Montana politician) =

American politician

18th Secretary of State of Montana
- In office January 1, 2001 – January 3, 2005
- Governor: Judy Martz
- Preceded by: Mike Cooney
- Succeeded by: Brad Johnson

President of the Montana Senate
- In office 1995–1996

Member of the Montana Senate
- In office 1975–1997

Member of the Montana House of Representatives
- In office 1970–1974

Personal details
- Born: December 11, 1947 (age 78) Missoula, Montana, U.S.
- Party: Republican
- Education: Montana State University (BA); University of Montana (MEd)

Bob Brown (born December 11, 1947) is an American politician who was the Secretary of State for Montana and the Republican nominee for Governor of Montana in 2004.

As a young man, Brown was elected to Montana Legislature. Brown spent four years in the State House (1970–1974) and 23 in the Senate (1975–1997), serving as president from 1995-96. His political mentors include Jean Turnage, who spent 20 years in the Senate and subsequently 15 as chief justice of the Supreme Court before retiring in 1991.

Brown became Senate education chairman in 1977 and served in that capacity through 1983. He served as chairman of the taxation committee in 1987. He became chairman of the committee on committees in 1989. He sat on the judicial committee from 1975 to 1993.

In 2000, Brown ran for secretary of state and won by a 7 percent margin. In 2004, Brown entered the 2004 Montana gubernatorial election against Democrat Brian Schweitzer. Although the race was heated, he eventually lost.

He served as a fellow at both the Carol O'Connor Center for the Rocky Mountain West and the Maureen & Mike Mansfield Center at the University of Montana. He is currently retired and sits on the board of the Montana State Historical Society. In the 2016 U.S. presidential election, he endorsed Democratic Party nominee Hillary Clinton.

Political offices
Preceded by Fred Van Valkenburg	President of the Montana Senate; 1995–1997	Succeeded by Gary Aklestad
Preceded by Mike Cooney	Secretary of State of Montana; 2001–2005	Succeeded by Brad Johnson
Party political offices
Preceded by Judy Martz	Republican nominee for Governor of Montana; 2004	Succeeded by Roy Brown
