= Kendall Van Dyk =

American politician

Member of the Montana Senate from the 25th district
- In office January 3, 2011 – January 4, 2015
- Preceded by: Roy Brown
- Succeeded by: Mary McNally

Member of the Montana House of Representatives from the 49th district
- In office 2007 – January 3, 2011
- Succeeded by: Mary McNally

Personal details
- Born: Kendall John Van Dyk; March 21, 1980 (age 46) Bozeman, Montana, U.S.
- Party: Democratic
- Education: Montana State University, Bozeman

Kendall John Van Dyk (born March 21, 1980) was a Democratic Party member of the Montana Senate, representing District 25 in north-central Billings, Montana from 2011 to 2015. He previously served in the Montana House of Representatives from 2007 until 2011.

== Personal life and education ==
Van Dyk earned a B.A. in political science from Montana State University. Van Dyk has volunteered for Habitat for Humanity and the Montana Wildlife Federation. He is a member of the Montana Bowhunters Association, the Montana Conservation Voters, the Rocky Mountain Elk Foundation, and the National Rifle Association of America.

== Career ==
Van Dyk has worked as the Western Energy Coordinator for Trout Unlimited, a field organizer for the Northern Plains Resource Council, and as a ranch hand at Spring Creek Farms.

Van Dyk served as chairman of the Fish, Wildlife and Parks Committee in the Montana House of Representatives. He is the author of the most recent update to the Montana Stream Access Law, an Act of the 2009 session giving the public the right to access Montana rivers and streams from public bridges. In a run for the 25th Senate district of Montana in 2010, Van Dyk unseated incumbent Republican Senator Roy Brown by just four votes.
