= National Healthy Mothers, Healthy Babies Coalition =

The National Healthy Mothers, Healthy Babies Coalition (HMHB) was an American non-profit organization founded in 1981 in response to the US Surgeon General's conference on infant mortality. The mission was to improve the quality and reach of public and professional education related to prenatal and infant care. The six lead organizations establishing HMHB were the American College of Obstetricians and Gynecologists (ACOG), the March of Dimes, the American Academy of Pediatrics (AAP), the American Nurses Association (ANA), the National Congress of Parents and Teachers, and the United States Public Health Service.

HMHB’s mission evolved into a movement to improve the health and safety of mothers, babies and families through educational materials and collaborative partnerships. The coalition had membership of over 100 local, state and national organizations and does outreach, education and advocacy with healthcare professionals, parents and policymakers. Among the coalition’s goals: reducing infant mortality, premature birth and postpartum depression, as well as other health and safety issues facing mothers and infants.

In May 2015, the organization's operations moved to Zero to Three, the National Center for Infants, Toddler and Families.

== Text4baby ==
On February 4, 2010, Chief Technology Officer of the United States and Associate Director of the White House Office of Science and Technology Policy Aneesh Chopra announced the launch of Text4baby, an educational program of HMHB developed through a broad public-private partnership. The mobile health service promotes maternal and child health among underserved women.

Text4baby is the first-ever free mobile health service in the United States. It provides scientifically-reviewed health tips, reminders and information about community resources, delivered via SMS text messages sent to the mobile phones of subscribing women. Messages are timed to the mother’s stage of pregnancy or the baby’s date of birth. Pregnant women and new mothers subscribe to the service by texting BABY to 511411. Mothers enroll in the Spanish-language Text4baby service by texting BEBE TO 511411.

In addition to HMHB, Text4baby founding partners include Voxiva, CTIA-The Wireless Foundation (whose wireless carrier members distribute the CMS text messages for free), grey healthcare group and founding corporate sponsor Johnson & Johnson. Sponsors include WellPoint, Pfizer, CareFirst BlueCross BlueShield. U.S. government partners include the White House Office of Science and Technology Policy, the Department of Health and Human Services and Department of Defense Military Health System. Implementation partners include BabyCenter, LLC, Danya International, Syniverse Technologies, Keynote Systems and The George Washington University. MTV Networks is a media sponsor.

In August 2010, Text4baby won the “Secretary’s Pick” HHS Innovates Award from the U.S. Department of Health and Human Services. In June 2011, Text4baby won the Public Relations Society of America’s (PRSA) Best of Silver Anvil Award.

On May 4, 2015 Text4baby's operations moved to ZERO TO THREE, the National Center for Infants, Toddlers & Families (ZTT).

== Controversies ==
In October 2007, HMHB was part of a Maternal Nutrition Group made up of academics in obstetrics and nutritionists that released recommendations on seafood consumption during pregnancy. This recommendation conflicted with official public health advice from EPA/FDA, due to the amount of mercury found in seafood posing a risk to fetal and newborn brain development.

HMHB received a $70,000 donation from the National Fisheries Institute, an industry group formed to promote eating seafood, prior to releasing this recommendation.
