= Robert Story (politician) =

American politician

Member of the Montana Senate from the 30th district
- In office 2002 - 2010

Personal details
- Born: December 10, 1952 (age 73)
- Party: Republican

Robert Story Jr (born December 10, 1952) is a former Montana state politician from Park City.

== Life and career ==
Born in Billings, Story earned a bachelor's degree in agricultural education from Montana State University in 1975, was a teacher in the small town of Opheim for three years, and has served on the school board in Park City. He is a descendant of a brother of Nelson Story and farms and ranches on property acquired by his family in the late 19th century; he returned to the ranch after his father was injured.

He became involved in the Montana Farm Bureau Federation and then represented Park City in the Montana Legislature as a Republican Party for 16 years, being elected to the House in 1994 to succeed retiring Republican Vernon Keller and to the Senate from District 30 in 2002. He served in the House as chairman of the Taxation Committee and in the Senate as vice chairman of the Taxation Committee and from January 2009 as President and retired in 2010, when he termed out.

In 2013 he was named president of the Montana Taxpayers Association.
