= 1976 United States Senate election in Montana =

- November 2, 1976
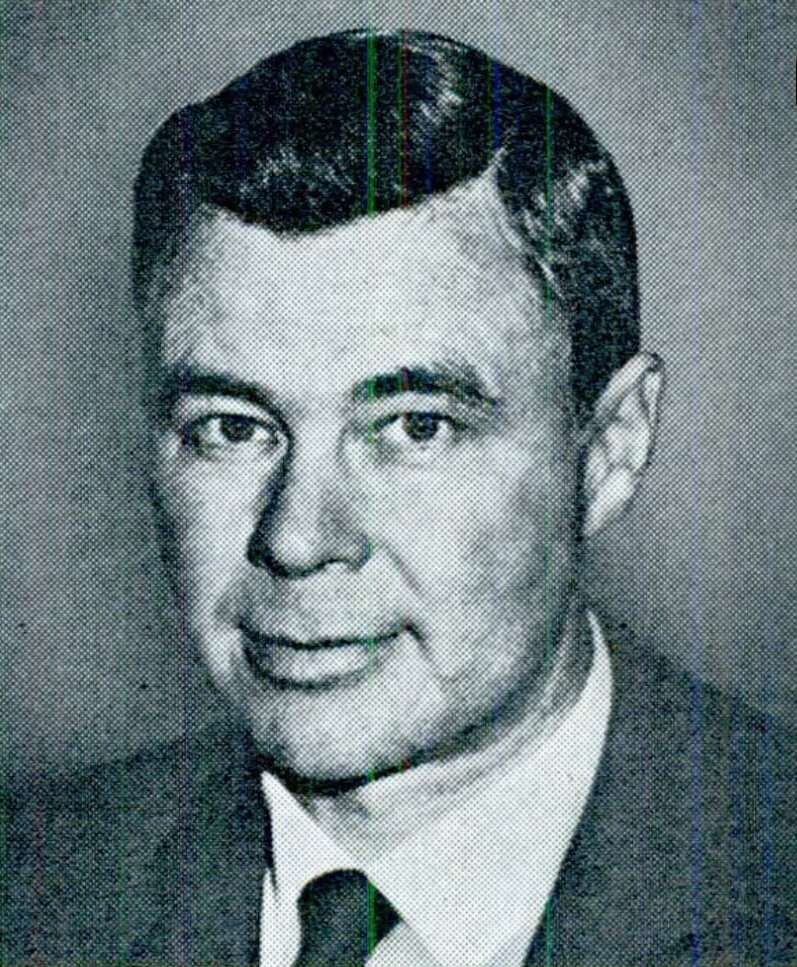

Nominee	John Melcher	Stanley Burger
Party	Democratic	Republican
Popular vote	206,232	115,213
Percentage	64.16%	35.84%
- County results Melcher: 50–60% 60–70% 70–80% 80–90% Burger: 50–60%
U.S. senator before election
Mike Mansfield
Democratic
Elected U.S. Senator
John Melcher
Democratic

The 1976 United States Senate election in Montana took place on November 2, 1976. Rather than seek a fifth term, incumbent United States Senator Mike Mansfield, a Democrat, opted to retire, creating an open seat. United States Congressman John Melcher, who had represented Montana's 2nd congressional district from 1969 to 1977, won the Democratic nomination and defeated Stanley C. Burger, the Republican nominee, by a wide margin in the general election. This was the first open seat election in Montana since 1960 and the first open seat election in Montana for the Class 1 Senate seat since 1922.

== Democratic primary ==
=== Candidates ===
- Ray Gulick, farmer
- John Melcher, United States congressman from Montana's 2nd congressional district

=== Results ===
Democratic Party primary results
Party	Candidate	Votes	%
Democratic	Jack Melcher	89,413	88.52
Democratic	Ray E. Gulick	11,593	11.48
Total votes		101,006	100.00

== Republican primary ==
=== Candidates ===
- Stanley C. Burger, former executive officer of the Montana Farm Bureau Federation
- Dave Drum
- Larry L. Gilbert
- Jack Tierney

=== Results ===
Republican primary results
Party	Candidate	Votes	%
Republican	Stanley C. Burger	32,313	40.41
Republican	Dave Drum	27,257	34.09
Republican	Jack Tierney	15,129	18.92
Republican	Larry L. Gilbert	5,258	6.58
Total votes		79,957	100.00

== General election ==
=== Results ===
United States Senate election in Montana, 1976
Party	Candidate	Votes	%	±%
Democratic	John Melcher	206,232	64.16%	+3.62%
Republican	Stanley C. Burger	115,213	35.84%	−3.62%
Majority		91,019	28.32%	+7.24%
Turnout		321,445		
Democratic hold		Swing		

== See also ==
- 1976 United States Senate elections
