= Medical uses of silver =

- Silver is added to some bandages for its antimicrobial effect, but evidence of its usefulness is mixed.

The medical uses of silver include its use in wound dressings, creams, and as an antibiotic coating on medical devices. Wound dressings containing silver sulfadiazine or silver nanomaterials may be used to treat external infections. The limited evidence available shows that silver coatings on endotracheal breathing tubes may reduce the incidence of ventilator-associated pneumonia. There is tentative evidence that using silver-alloy indwelling catheters for short-term catheterizing will reduce the risk of catheter-acquired urinary tract infections.

Silver generally has low toxicity, and minimal risk is expected when silver is used in approved medical applications. Alternative medicine products such as colloidal silver are controversial.

== Mechanism of action ==
Silver and most silver compounds have an oligodynamic effect and are toxic for bacteria, algae, and fungi in vitro. The antibacterial action of silver is dependent on the silver ion. The effectiveness of silver compounds as an antiseptic is based on the ability of the biologically active silver ion (Ag^{+}) to irreversibly damage key enzyme systems in the cell membranes of pathogens. The antibacterial action of silver has long been known to be enhanced by the presence of an electric field. Applying an electric current across silver electrodes enhances antibiotic action at the anode, likely due to the release of silver into the bacterial culture. The antibacterial action of electrodes coated with silver nanostructures is greatly improved in the presence of an electric field.

Silver, used as a topical antiseptic, is incorporated by bacteria it kills. Thus dead bacteria may be the source of silver that may kill additional bacteria.

== Medical uses ==
=== Antibacterial cream ===
Silver sulfadiazine (SSD) is a topical antibiotic used in partial thickness and full thickness burns to prevent infection. It was discovered in the 1960s, and was the standard topical antimicrobial for burn wounds for decades.

However systemic reviews in 2014, 2017 and 2018 concluded that more modern treatments, both with and without silver, show better results for wound healing and infection-prevention than silver sulfadiazine, and therefore SSD is no longer generally recommended.

It is on the World Health Organization's List of Essential Medicines. The US Food and Drug Administration (FDA) approved a number of topical preparations of silver sulfadiazine for treatment of second-degree and third-degree burns.

=== Dressings ===
Despite its widespread use, there is only mixed evidence that silver in dressings has any benefit. A 2018 Cochrane review found that silver-containing dressings may increase the probability of healing for venous leg ulcers.

A number of wound dressings containing silver as an anti-bacterial have been cleared by the U.S. Food and Drug Administration (FDA). However, silver-containing dressings may cause staining, and in some cases tingling sensations as well.

=== Endotracheal tubes ===
A 2015 systematic review concluded that the limited evidence available indicates that using silver-coated endotracheal breathing tubes reduces the risk of contracting ventilator-associated pneumonia (VAP), especially during the initial days of utilisation. A 2014 study concluded that using silver-coated endotracheal tubes will help to prevent VAP and that this may save on hospital costs. A 2012 systematic review of randomized controlled trials concluded that the limited evidence available indicates that using silver-coated endotracheal tubes will reduce the incidence of ventilator-associated pneumonia, microbiologic burden, and device-related adverse events among adult patients. Another 2012 review agreed that the use of silver-coated endotracheal tubes reduces the prevalence of VAP in intubated patients, but cautioned that this on its own is not sufficient to prevent infection. They also suggested that more research is needed to establish the cost-effectiveness of the treatment. Another 2012 study agreed that there is evidence that endotracheal tubes coated with silver may reduce the incidence of ventilator associated pneumonia (VAP) and delay its onset, but concluded that no benefit was seen in the duration of intubation, the duration of stay in intensive care or the mortality rate. They also raised concerns surrounding the unblinded nature of some of the studies then available.

The U.S. Food and Drug Administration (FDA) in 2007 cleared an endotracheal tube with a fine coat of silver to reduce the risk of ventilator-associated pneumonia.

=== Catheters ===
A 2014 systemic review concluded that using silver alloy-coated catheters showed no significant difference in incidences of symptomatic Catheter-Associated Urinary Tract Infections (CAUTI) versus using standard catheters, although silver-alloy catheters seemed to cause less discomfort to patients. These catheters are associated with greater cost than other catheters. A 2014 Multicenter Cohort Study found that using a silver-alloy hydrogel urinary catheter did reduce symptomatic Catheter-Associated Urinary Tract Infection (CAUTI) occurrences as defined by both NHSN and clinical criteria. A 2011 critical analysis of eight studies found a consistent pattern which supported using silver-alloy urinary catheters over uncoated catheters to reduce infections in adult patients, and concluded that using silver-alloy catheters would significantly improve patient care. A 2007 systemic review concluded that using silver-alloy indwelling catheters for short-term catheterizing will reduce the risk of catheter-acquired urinary tract infection, but called for further studies to evaluate the economic benefits of using the expensive silver alloy-catheters. Two systemic reviews in 2004 found that using silver-alloy catheters reduced asymptomatic and symptomatic bacteriuria more than standard catheters, for patients who were catheterised for a short time. A 2000 randomized crossover study found that using the more expensive silver-coated catheter may result in cost savings by preventing nosocomial UTI infections, and another 2000 study found that using silver alloy catheters for short-term urinary catheterization reduces the incidence of symptomatic UTI and bacteremia compared with standard catheters, and may thus yield cost savings.

A 2017 study found that a combination of chlorhexidine and silver-sulfadiazine (CSS) used to coat central venous catheters (CVC) reduces the rate of catheter-related bloodstream infections. However, they also found that the efficacy of the CSS-CVC coating was progressively eroded by blood-flow, and that the antibacterial function was lost after 48 hours.

=== Conjugations with existing drugs ===
Research in 2018 into the treatment of central nervous system infections caused by free-living amoebae such as Naegleria fowleri and Acanthamoeba castellanii, tested the effectiveness of existing drugs as well as the effectiveness of the same drugs when they were conjugated with silver nanoparticles. In vitro tests demonstrated more potent amoebicidal effects for the drugs when conjugated with silver nanoparticles as compared to the same drugs when used alone. They also found that conjugating the drugs with silver nanoparticles enhanced their anti-acanthamoebic activity.

=== X-ray film ===
Silver-halide imaging plates used with X-ray imaging were the standard before digital techniques arrived; these function essentially the same as other silver-halide photographic films, although for x-ray use the developing process is very simple and takes only a few minutes. Silver x-ray film remains popular for its accuracy, and cost effectiveness, particularly in developing countries, where digital X-ray technology is usually not available.

=== Other uses ===
Silver compounds have been used in external preparations as antiseptics, including both silver nitrate and silver proteinate. Before the development of antibiotics, Credé's prophylaxis used a 2% solution of silver nitrate to prevent neonatal conjunctivitis, which used to account for half of all cases of blindness in Europe. The original procedure called for a 2% silver nitrate solution administered immediately after birth, as Credé erroneously believed that a 1% solution was ineffective due to a previous study by Hecker; however, this was eventually corrected and reduced back down to a 1% solution to reduce chemical irritation to the newborn's eyes. Silver nitrate is also sometimes used in dermatology in solid stick form as a caustic ("lunar caustic") to treat certain skin conditions, such as corns and warts.

Silver nitrate is also used in certain laboratory procedures to stain cells. As it turns them permanently a dark-purple/black color, in doing so increasing individual cells' visibility under a microscope and allowing for differentiation between cells, or identification of irregularities. Silver is also used in bone prostheses and cardiac devices. In reconstructive hip and knee surgery, silver-coated titanium prostheses are indicated in cases of recalcitrant prosthetic joint infections. Silver diammine fluoride appears to be an effective intervention to reduce dental caries (tooth decay). Silver is also a component in dental amalgam.

Silver acetate has been used as a potential aid to help stop smoking; a review of the literature in 2012, however, found no effect of silver acetate on smoking cessation at a six-month endpoint and if there is an effect it would be small. Silver has also been used in cosmetics, intended to enhance antimicrobial effects and the preservation of ingredients.

== Adverse effects ==
Though toxicity of silver is low, the human body has no biological use for silver and when inhaled, ingested, injected, or applied topically, silver can accumulate irreversibly in the body, particularly in the skin, and chronic use combined with exposure to sunlight can result in a disfiguring condition known as argyria in which the skin becomes blue or blue-gray. Localized argyria can occur as a result of topical use of silver-containing creams and solutions, while the ingestion, inhalation, or injection can result in generalized argyria. Preliminary reports of treatment with laser therapy have been reported. These laser treatments are painful and general anesthesia is required. A similar laser treatment has been used to clear silver particles from the eye, a condition related to argyria called argyrosis. The Agency for Toxic Substances and Disease Registry (ATSDR) describes argyria as a "cosmetic problem".

One incident of argyria came to the public's attention in 2008, when a man named Paul Karason, whose skin turned blue from using colloidal silver for over 10 years to treat dermatitis, appeared on NBC's Today show. Karason died in 2013 at the age of 62 after a heart attack. Another example is Montana politician Stan Jones whose purposeful consumption of colloidal silver was a self-prescribed measure he undertook in response to his fears that the Y2K problem would make antibiotics unavailable, an event that did not occur.

Colloidal silver may interact with some prescription medications, reducing the absorption of some antibiotics and thyroxine, among others.

Some people are allergic to silver, and the use of treatments and medical devices containing silver is contraindicated for such people. Although medical devices containing silver are widely used in hospitals, no thorough testing and standardization of these products has yet been undertaken.

== Water purification ==
Electrolytically dissolved silver has been used as a water disinfecting agent, for example, the drinking water supplies of the Russian Mir orbital station and the International Space Station. Many modern hospitals filter hot water through copper-silver filters to defeat MRSA and legionella infections. The World Health Organization (WHO) includes silver in a colloidal state produced by electrolysis of silver electrodes in water, and colloidal silver in water filters as two of a number of water disinfection methods specified to provide safe drinking water in developing countries. Along these lines, a ceramic filtration system coated with silver particles has been created by Ron Rivera of Potters for Peace and used in developing countries for water disinfection (in this application the silver inhibits microbial growth on the filter substrate, to prevent clogging, and does not directly disinfect the filtered water).

== Alternative medicine ==
Colloidal silver
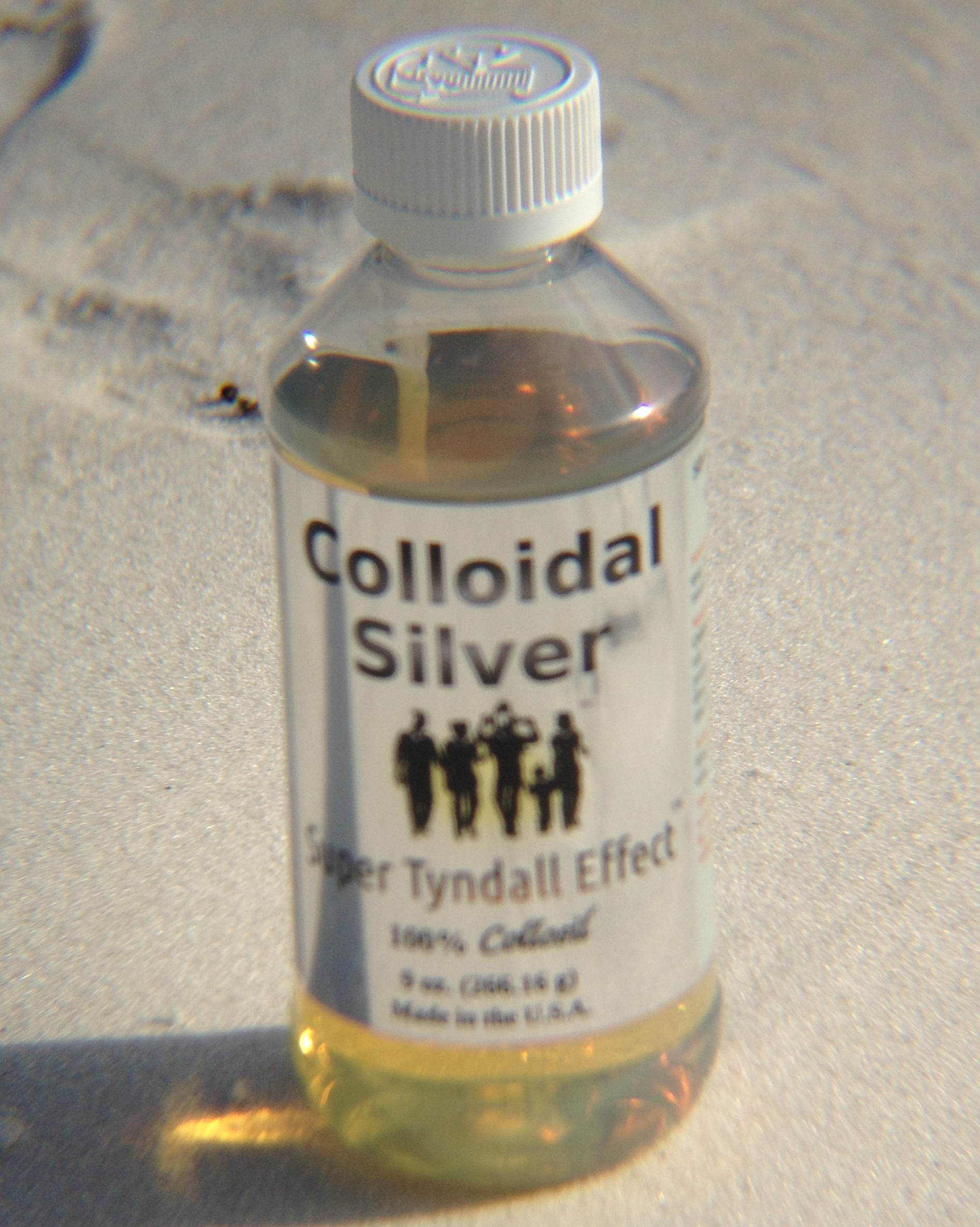
- A bottle of colloidal silver

Alternative therapy
- Legality: Not to be sold for consumption or disinfection in Sweden. Not to treat or prevent cancer (UK, Sweden, etc.) Illegal to be marketed/advertised as a dietary supplement or medicine in the U.S.

Colloidal silver (a colloid consisting of silver nanoparticles suspended in liquid) and formulations containing silver salts were used by physicians in the early 20th century, but their use was largely discontinued in the 1940s following the development of modern antibiotics. Since about 1990, there has been a resurgence of the promotion of colloidal silver as a dietary supplement (used internally), marketed with claims of its being an essential mineral supplement, or that it can prevent or treat numerous diseases, such as cancer, diabetes, arthritis, HIV/AIDS, herpes, and tuberculosis. No medical evidence supports the effectiveness of colloidal silver for any of these claimed indications. Silver is not an essential mineral in humans; there is no dietary requirement for silver, and hence, no such thing as a silver "deficiency". There is no evidence that colloidal silver treats or prevents any medical condition, and it can cause serious and potentially irreversible side effects, such as argyria.

In August 1999, the U.S. FDA banned colloidal silver sellers from claiming any therapeutic or preventive value for the product, although silver-containing products continue to be promoted as dietary supplements in the U.S. under the looser regulatory standards applied to supplements. The FDA has issued numerous warning letters to Internet sites that have continued to promote colloidal silver as an "antibiotic" or for other medical purposes. Despite the efforts of the FDA, silver products remain widely available on the market today. A review of websites promoting nasal sprays containing colloidal silver suggested that information about silver-containing nasal sprays on the Internet is misleading and inaccurate. Colloidal silver is also sold in some topical cosmetics, as well as some toothpastes, which are regulated by the FDA as cosmetics (other than drug ingredients making medical claims).

In 2002, the Australian Therapeutic Goods Administration (TGA) found there were no legitimate medical uses for colloidal silver and no evidence to support its marketing claims. The U.S. National Center for Complementary and Integrative Health (NCCIH) warns that marketing claims about colloidal silver are scientifically unsupported, that the silver content of marketed supplements varies widely, and that colloidal silver products can have serious side effects such as argyria. In 2009, the USFDA issued a consumer advisory warning about the potential adverse effects of colloidal silver, and said that "there are no legally marketed prescription or over-the-counter (OTC) drugs containing silver that are taken by mouth". Quackwatch states that colloidal silver dietary supplements have not been found safe or effective for the treatment of any condition. Consumer Reports lists colloidal silver as a "supplement to avoid", describing it as "likely unsafe". The Los Angeles Times stated that "colloidal silver as a cure-all is a fraud with a long history, with quacks claiming it could cure cancer, AIDS, tuberculosis, diabetes, and numerous other diseases". Rosemary Jacobs has been an advocate against colloidal silver for decades: after being treated with it when she was young, she developed argyria.

It may be illegal to market as a preventive or as a treatment for cancer, and in some jurisdictions to sell colloidal silver for consumption. In 2015 an English man was prosecuted and found guilty under the Cancer Act 1939 for selling colloidal silver with claims it could treat cancer.

=== Fraudulent products marketed during the COVID-19 outbreak ===
The US Food and Drug Administration has issued warning letters to firms including colloidal silver marketers for selling products with false and misleading claims to prevent, treat, mitigate, diagnose or cure coronavirus disease 2019 (COVID-19).

In 2020, televangelist felon Jim Bakker was sued by the Missouri Attorney General (AG) for marketing colloidal silver products and making false claims about their effectiveness against COVID-19. The Attorney General of New York sent a cease and desist order to Bakker and others about peddling the unproven products that were compared to selling "snake oil", and the Food and Drug Administration also warned Bakker about his actions.

Controversial web show host, podcaster and conspiracy theorist Alex Jones was also warned by the New York Attorney General's office to stop marketing his colloidal silver infused products (toothpaste, mouthwash, dietary supplements, etc.) because he made unproven claims of its ability to fend off COVID-19.

== History ==
Hippocrates in his writings discussed the use of silver in wound care. At the beginning of the twentieth century surgeons routinely used silver sutures to reduce the risk of infection. In the early 20th century, physicians used silver-containing eyedrops to treat ophthalmic problems, for various infections, and sometimes internally for diseases such as tropical sprue, epilepsy, gonorrhea, and the common cold. During World War I, soldiers used silver leaf to treat infected wounds.

In the 1840s, founder of gynecology J. Marion Sims employed silver wire, which he had a jeweler fashion, as a suture in gynecological surgery. This produced very favorable results when compared with its predecessors, silk and catgut.

Prior to the introduction of modern antibiotics, colloidal silver was used as a germicide and disinfectant. With the development of modern antibiotics in the 1940s, the use of silver as an antimicrobial agent diminished, although it retains some use in medicinal compounds today. Silver sulfadiazine (SSD) is a compound containing silver and the antibiotic sodium sulfadiazine, which was developed in 1968.

== Cost ==
The National Health Services (NHS) in the UK spent about £25 million on silver-containing dressings in 2006. Silver-containing dressings represent about 14% of the total dressings used and about 25% of the overall wound dressing costs.

Concerns have been expressed about the potential environmental cost of manufactured silver nanomaterials in consumer applications being released into the environment, for example that they may pose a threat to benign soil organisms.

== See also ==
- List of ineffective cancer treatments
- Colloidal gold
- Antibiotic properties of nanoparticles
