= Macrodiol =

Macrodiol may refer to:

- A diol that is a large molecule.
- Estradiol
- High-molecular weight diols used in the synthesis of polyurethanes
