= Charles Prévost =

Charles Prévost may refer to:

- Charles Prévost (chemist) (1899–1983), French chemist
- Charles Prévost (cyclist) (1871–1947), French road cyclist

== See also ==
- James Charles Prevost (1810–1891), English admiral in the Royal Navy
