= Evans–Tishchenko reaction =

Chemical reaction

The Evans–Tishchenko reaction is the diastereoselective reduction of β-hydroxy ketones to the corresponding 1,3-anti diol monoesters. The reaction employs a Lewis acid, often samarium iodide, and an aldehyde. It was first described in 1990 by David A. Evans and Amir Hoveyda, as a development of the well-known Tishchenko reaction discovered in 1906. The Aldol–Tishchenko reaction provides another potential route to 1,3-diol monoester products.

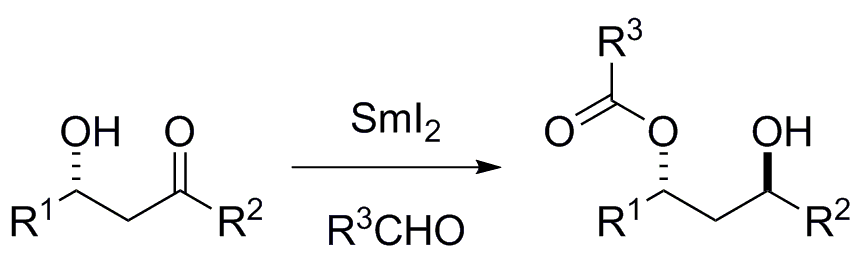
Scheme for the Evans–Tishchenko reaction

== Mechanism ==
The reaction mechanism involves the attack of the aldehyde from the free alcohol group. The Lewis acid can then chelate between the two oxygen atoms to form a cyclic, 6-membered transition state. The hydride, formerly the formyl hydrogen on the aldehyde, is delivered intramolecularly, accounting for the observed anti diastereoselectivity: the result is a 1,3-anti diol monoester. The proposed mechanism is further supported by isotopic labeling, which demonstrates that the formyl hydrogen is the one that migrates.

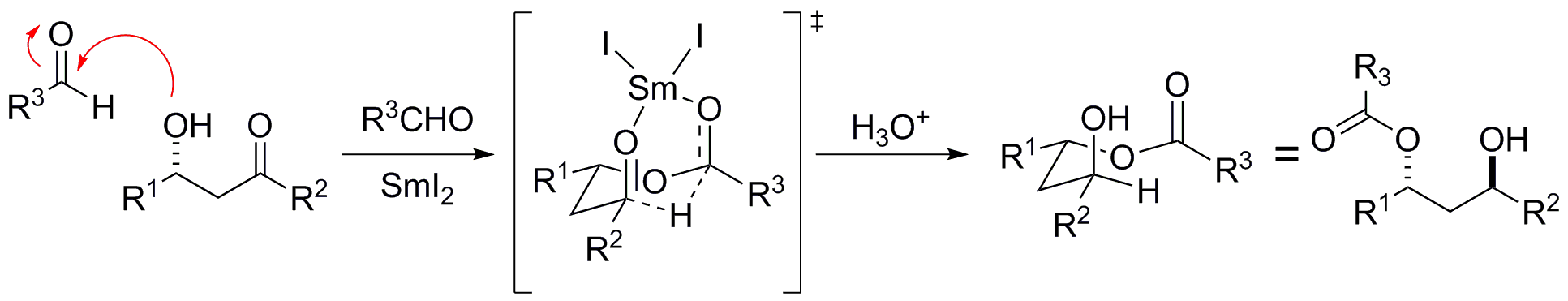
Mechanism for the Evans–Tishchenko reaction

== Scope and applications ==
The power of this reaction when compared to other methods of generating syn and anti diols, such as the Narasaka–Prasad reduction or the Evans–Saksena reduction, is the ability to differentiate between the two resulting hydroxyl groups, effectively selectively protecting one of them. For this reason, this reduction has been widely used in the literature, especially in the total synthesis of natural products.
