= Francisco Lluch Mora =

Puerto Rican historian (1924–2006)

- Born: 7 May 1924; Yauco, Puerto Rico
- Died: 26 October 2006 (aged 82); Yauco, Puerto Rico
- Occupations: Historian, poet, writer, teacher, and college professor
- Spouse: Sylvia Doris Velez Catala

Francisco José Antonio Lluch Mora (7 May 1924 – 26 October 2006) was a Puerto Rican historian, poet, writer, school teacher and college professor. He is best known for his legendary book "Orígenes y Fundación de Ponce y Otras Noticias Relativas a su Desarrollo Urbano, Demográfico y Cultural (Siglos XVI-XIX)".

== Early years ==
Lluch Mora was born 7 May 1924 in Yauco, Puerto Rico. His parents were Enrique Lluch Polidori (1 October 1894 – 20 October 1965) and Matilde Mora y Berenguer. He was the eldest of five brothers. His brothers were Enrique, Eugenio, Federico, Jaime and Francisco Poudevida Mora.

== Career ==
=== Teacher, professor, scholar ===
Lluch Mora was a school teacher and university professor, teaching Spanish, literature, and history. He started his teaching career as a school teacher in the elementary and high schools of his hometown Yauco and also taught in Guánica. He held various other positions within the Puerto Rico Department of Education. He also taught at both private and public universities. He was head of the Department of Hispanic Studies of the University of Puerto Rico at Mayaguez, head of the Department of Spanish at the University of Puerto Rico at Ponce and professor at the graduate school of the Pontificia Universidad Católica de Puerto Rico.

=== Historian ===
Lluch Mora was a highly regarded historian, receiving many honors and accolades. He published various books, among them his masterpiece "Orígenes y Fundación de Ponce y Otras Noticias Relativas a su Desarrollo Urbano, Demográfico y Cultural (Siglos XVI-XIX)", which earned him a recognition by the Puerto Rico Senate in 2001.

=== Poetry ===
In the area of poetry Lluch Mora is remembered for "Tu presencia" (1949), and "Canto desesperado a la ceniza" (1955). His literary personality has been studied by Eduardo Cautino Jordan in "La personalidad literaria de Francisco Lluch Mora." His extensive bibliography has been written by Ana María Ortiz Salichs in "Francisco Lluch Mora: bibliografía mínima."

== Accolades ==
In 1995, Lluch Mora received the award of Humanista del Año (Humanist of the Year) from the "Fundación Puertorriqueña de las Humanidades." He was also Charter Member of "Academia Puertorriqueña de la Lengua" (Puerto Rican Academy of Language), the "Academia de Artes y Ciencias" (Academy of Arts and Sciences) and the "Academia de Artes, Historia y Arqueología" (Academy of Arts, History, and Archeology). He was also charter member of the "Sociedad Puertorriqueña de Escritores" (Puerto Rican Writers Society) and the "Sociedad de Autores Puertorriqueños" (Society of Puerto Rican Authors), among others. He received an honorary doctoral degree (Doctor Honoris Causa) from the Universidad Central del Caribe and the Universidad Mundial de Puerto Rico and was awarded the honor of "Caballero de la Orden de San Juan Bautista" from Puerto Rico, and "Caballero de la Orden de la Cruz de Jerusalén" from Rome.

== Family life ==
Lluch Mora married Sylvia Doris Velez Catala on 6 February 1943 in Yauco and had 4 children: Enrique, Amalia, Eugenia and Ana.

== Death ==
Lluch Mora died 26 October 2006 in Yauco, Puerto Rico. He was buried at Cementerio Nuevo Municipal de Yauco.

== Works ==
Among his better known works are:

- Orígenes y Fundación de Ponce y Otras Noticias Relativas a su Desarrollo Urbano, Demográfico y Cultural (Siglos XVI-XIX). (Plaza Mayor; San Juan, Puerto Rico; 2000)
- Palabras en el Tiempo. (Colección Aquí y Ahora) (1996)
- La huella del latido: Decimario (1947–1985). (1994)
- Rebelion De San German, 1701–1712. Editorial Isla. (Dec 1981)
- Decimario primero. (Serie Literatura hoy) (1976)
- La lumbre y el ocaso: Momento de las alegorías, 1964–1965. (Colección Edil poética)(1973)
- Canto a Eugenio María de Hostos. (Riocañas) (1959)
- Canto desesperado a la ceniza. Elegía. (1955)
- Del barro a Dios. 1949–1950. Poems. (1954)
- Del asedio y la clausura. (1950)
- Fundación de la Villa de San Germán en las Lomas de Santa Marta.
- Historia del origen y fundación de Guayanilla. (Boston, 1977)
- Noticias sobre los orígenes y la fundación de Yauco.
- Noticias referentes a Ponce en los siglos XVIII y XIX.
- Poblamiento de Hormigueros (Siglos XVI-XIX).

== Honors and recognitions ==
On 1 November 2001 he was recognized by the Senate of Puerto Rico with Resolution Number 933. He is also recognized at Ponce's Park of Illustrious Ponce Citizens as one of Ponce's great historians.

== See also ==
- Ponce, Puerto Rico
- List of Puerto Ricans
