= Narasaka–Prasad reduction =

The Narasaka–Prasad reduction, sometimes simply called Narasaka reduction, is a diastereoselective reduction of β-hydroxy ketones to the corresponding syn-dialcohols. The reaction employs a boron chelating agent, such as BBu_{2}OMe, and a reducing agent, commonly sodium borohydride. This protocol was first discovered by Narasaka in 1984.

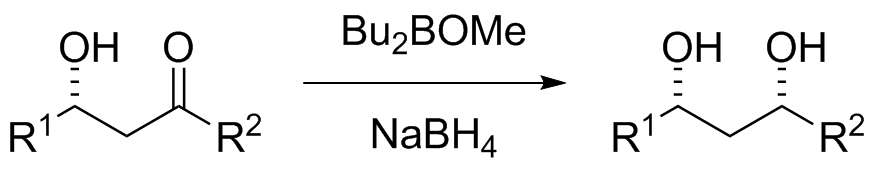
Scheme for the Narasaka–Prasad reduction

The reaction proceeds through the 6-membered transition state shown below. Chelation by the boron agent favors hydride delivery from the top face because it leads directly to the more stable chair-like conformation of the product (Fürst-Plattner Rule). The intermolecular hydride delivery from NaBH_{4} therefore proceeds via an axial attack from the opposite face with respect to the existing alcohol.

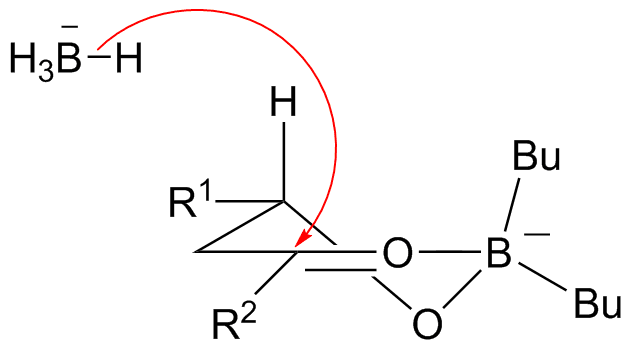
Transition state for the Narasaka–Prasad reduction showing the reasons for the observed diastereoselectivity

This reaction can be contrasted with the similar Evans–Saksena reduction that employs a different boron reagent in order to achieve intramolecular hydride delivery from the same face of the alcohol, thus producing the anti-diol.

The Narasaka–Prasad reduction has been employed in many total syntheses in the literature, such as discodermolide

== See also ==
- Evans–Tishchenko reaction
