= Sebacic acid =

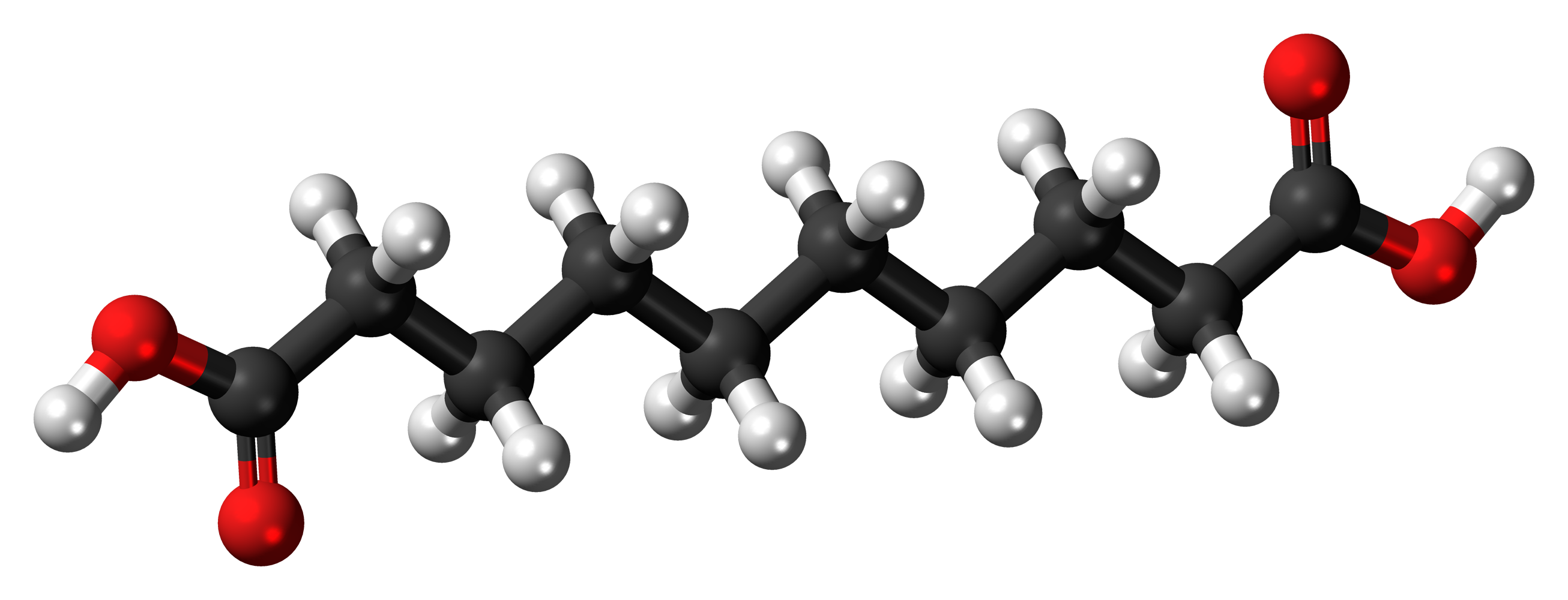

Names
- Preferred IUPAC name Decanedioic acid
- Other names 1,8-Octanedicarboxylic acid Decane-1,10-dioic acid

Identifiers
CAS Number	111-20-6
3D model (JSmol)	Interactive image
ChEBI	CHEBI:41865
ChemSpider	5004
ECHA InfoCard	100.003.496
EC Number	203-845-5
MeSH	C011107
PubChem CID	5192
UNII	97AN39ICTC
CompTox Dashboard (EPA)	DTXSID7026867
- InChI: InChI=1S/C10H18O4/c11-9(12)7-5-3-1-2-4-6-8-10(13)14/h1-8H2,(H,11,12)(H,13,14) Key: CXMXRPHRNRROMY-UHFFFAOYSA-N; InChI=1/C10H18O4/c11-9(12)7-5-3-1-2-4-6-8-10(13)14/h1-8H2,(H,11,12)(H,13,14) Key: CXMXRPHRNRROMY-UHFFFAOYAE
- SMILES: OC(=O)CCCCCCCCC(=O)O

Properties
Chemical formula	C_{10}H_{18}O_{4}
Molar mass	202.250 g·mol^{−1}
Density	1.209 g/cm^{3}
Melting point	131 to 134.5 °C (267.8 to 274.1 °F; 404.1 to 407.6 K)
Boiling point	294.4 °C (561.9 °F; 567.5 K) at 100 mmHg
Solubility in water	0.25 g/L
Acidity (pK_{a})	4.720, 5.450
- Except where otherwise noted, data are given for materials in their standard state (at 25 °C [77 °F], 100 kPa). verify (what is ?) Infobox references

Sebacic acid is a naturally occurring dicarboxylic acid with the chemical formula HO_{2}C(CH_{2})_{8}CO_{2}H. It is a white flake or powdered solid. Sebaceus is Latin for tallow candle, sebum is Latin for tallow, and refers to its use in the manufacture of candles. Sebacic acid is a derivative of castor oil.

In the industrial setting, sebacic acid and its homologues such as azelaic acid can be used as a monomer for nylon 610, plasticizers, lubricants, hydraulic fluids, cosmetics, candles, etc.

It can be used as a surfactant in the lubricating oil industry to increase the antirust properties of lubricating oils on metals.

== Production and reactions ==
Sebacic acid is produced from castor oil by cleavage of ricinoleic acid, which is obtained from castor oil. Octanol and glycerin are byproducts.

It can also be obtained from decalin via a hydroperoxide, which rearranges to give a hydroxycyclodecanone, which dehydrates to give cyclodecenone, a precursor to sebacic acid.

Sebacic acid has also been produced commercially by Kolbe electrolysis of adipic acid.

Conversion of dimethyl ester of sebacic acid to cyclodecanediol by acyloin condensation followed by hydrogenation using a copper chromite catalyst.

1,10-Decanediol is synthesized by reduction of diethyl sebacate, e.g. with sodium/ethanol.

== Potential medical significance ==
Sebum is a secretion by skin sebaceous glands. It is a waxy set of lipids composed of triglycerides (≈41%), wax esters (≈26%), squalene (≈12%), and free fatty acids (≈16%). Included in the free fatty acid secretions in sebum are polyunsaturated fatty acids and sebacic acid. Sebacic acid is also found in other lipids that coat the skin surface. Human neutrophils can convert sebacic acid to its 5-oxo analog, i.e., 5-oxo-6E,8Z-octadecenoic acid, a structural analog of 5-oxo-eicosatetraenoic acid and like this oxo-eicosatetraenoic acid is an exceptionally potent activator of eosinophils, monocytes, and other pro-inflammatory cells from humans and other species. This action is mediated by the OXER1 receptor on these cells. It is suggested that sebacic acid is converted to its 5-oxo analog during, and thereby stimulates pro-inflammatory cells to contribute to the worsening of, various inflammatory skin conditions.
