= Plattner =

Plattner is a surname. Notable people with the surname include:

- Hannelore Plattner, 20th-century Austrian luger
- Hasso Plattner (born 1944), German businessman, cofounder of the software company SAP AG
- Karl Friedrich Plattner (1800–1858), German metallurgical chemist
- Maria Plattner (born 2001), Austrian association football player

== See also ==
- Fürst-Plattner Rule
- Hasso Plattner Institute for Digital Engineering
- Hasso Plattner Institute of Design
- "The Plattner Story", a short story by H. G. Wells
- Platner (disambiguation)
