= Prévost reaction =

Chemical reaction

The Prévost reaction (English: /preɪˈvoʊ/ pray-VOH, French: [pʁevo]) is a chemical reaction in which an alkene is converted by iodine and the silver salt of benzoic acid to a vicinal diol with anti stereochemistry. The reaction was discovered by the French chemist Charles Prévost.

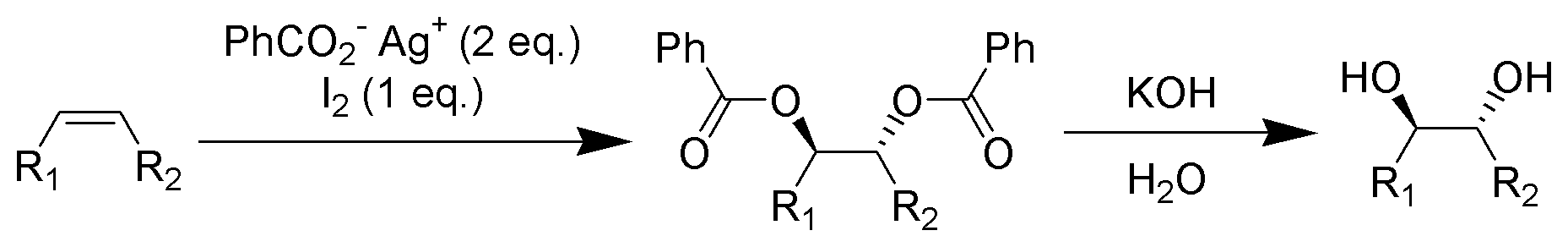
The Prévost reaction

== Reaction mechanism ==
The reaction between silver benzoate (1) and iodine is very fast and produces a very reactive iodinium benzoate intermediate (2). The reaction of the iodinium salt (2) with an alkene gives another short-lived iodinium salt (3). Nucleophilic substitution (S_{N}2) by the benzoate salt gives the ester (4). Another silver ion causes the neighboring group substitution of the benzoate ester to give the oxonium salt (5). A second S_{N}2 substitution by the benzoate anion gives the desired diester (6).

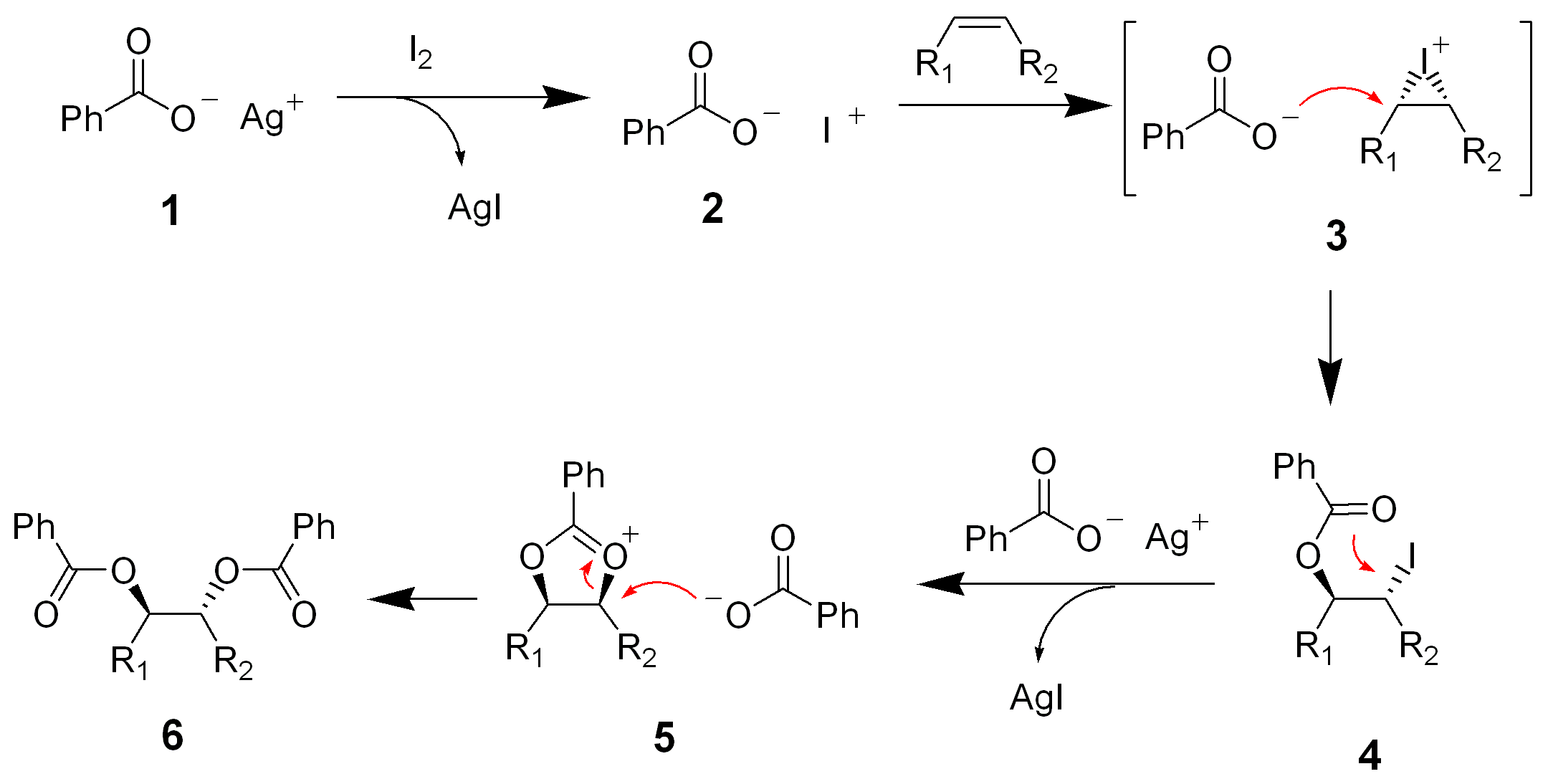
The mechanism of the Prévost reaction

In the final step hydrolysis of the ester groups gives the anti-diol. This outcome is the opposite of that of the related Woodward cis-hydroxylation which gives syn addition.

== See also ==
- Woodward cis-hydroxylation
