= Rosemary Jacobs =

American wellness activist

- Born: August 23, 1942 (age 83); Brooklyn, New York
- Occupations: teacher; activist

Rosemary Jacobs (born August 23, 1942) is an American teacher and activist who gained national recognition for her anti-alternative medication activism. She has suffered from argyria since she was young.

== Biography ==
Jacobs was born in Brooklyn, New York, and was raised on Long Island. At age 11, she began to suffer from persistent sniffles, and was prescribed nose drops by her eye, ear, nose, and throat doctor. Those drops contained colloidal silver, already considered an obsolete treatment at that point. By the time she was 15, she was diagnosed with argyria, a condition caused by the internal use of colloidal silver that results in a permanent silver or blue tint to your skin.

In 1965, she had a skin biopsy, revealing that there were a multitude of silver particles embedded deep within her epidermis. In the 1970s, she underwent skin dermabrasion in an effort to remove the silver. Her skin has remained silver-gray, however. She has faced serious discrimination due to her skin color, losing jobs and lodging because of this. Once, when she was in the hospital, nurses mistook her color as a sign of a heart attack. She worked as a preschool teacher at a Montessori school. She has been nationally noted as an example of this rare disease.

In the early 2000s, she became nationally prominent as an activist against colloidal silver, which had been removed from the approved list by the FDA in 1999 for fear of argyria. She has advocated for a full banning of colloidal silver and for warning labels on all products containing colloidal silver warning of the risk of argyria.
