= Diol =

Class of organic compounds

Ethylene glycol, a common diol

A diol is a chemical compound containing two hydroxyl groups (−OH groups). An aliphatic diol may also be called a glycol. This pairing of functional groups is pervasive, and many subcategories have been identified. They are used as protecting groups of carbonyl groups, making them essential in synthesis of organic chemistry.

The most common industrial diol is ethylene glycol. Examples of diols in which the hydroxyl functional groups are more widely separated include 1,4-butanediol HO−(CH_{2})_{4}−OH and propylene-1,3-diol, or beta propylene glycol, HO−CH_{2}−CH_{2}−CH_{2}−OH.

== Synthesis of classes of diols ==
=== Geminal diols ===
Propane-2,2-diol, an example of a geminal diol

A geminal diol has two hydroxyl groups bonded to the same atom. These species arise by hydration of the carbonyl compounds. The hydration is usually unfavorable, but a notable exception is formaldehyde which, in water, exists in equilibrium with methanediol H_{2}C(OH)_{2}. Another example is (F_{3}C)_{2}C(OH)_{2}, the hydrated form of hexafluoroacetone. Many gem-diols undergo further condensation to give dimeric and oligomeric derivatives. This reaction applies to glyoxal and related aldehydes.

=== Vicinal diols ===
In a vicinal diol, the two hydroxyl groups occupy vicinal positions, that is, they are attached to adjacent atoms. These compounds are called glycols (though the term can be used more widely). Examples include ethane-1,2-diol or ethylene glycol HO−(CH_{2})_{2}−OH, a common ingredient of antifreeze products. Another example is propane-1,2-diol, or alpha propylene glycol, HO−CH_{2}−CH(OH)−CH_{3}, used in the food and medicine industry, as well as a relatively non-poisonous antifreeze product.

On commercial scales, the main route to vicinal diols is the hydrolysis of epoxides. The epoxides are prepared by epoxidation of the alkene. An example in the synthesis of trans-cyclohexanediol or by microreactor:

A route to synthesizing trans-1,2-diols

For academic research and pharmaceutical areas, vicinal diols are often produced from the oxidation of alkenes, usually with dilute acidic potassium permanganate or Osmium tetroxide. Osmium tetroxide can similarly be used to oxidize alkenes to vicinal diols. The chemical reaction called Sharpless asymmetric dihydroxylation can be used to produce chiral diols from alkenes using an osmate reagent and a chiral catalyst. Another method is the Woodward cis-hydroxylation (cis diol) and the related Prévost reaction (anti diol), which both use iodine and the silver salt of a carboxylic acid.

A route to synthesizing cis-1,2-diols using osmium tetraoxide

An example of Prévost reaction used to synthesize anti diol

Other routes to vic-diols are the hydrogenation of acyloins and the pinacol coupling reaction.

=== 1,3-Diols ===
1,3-Diols are often prepared industrially by aldol condensation of ketones with formaldehyde. You can use many different starting materials to produce syn- or anti-1,3-diols. The resulting carbonyl is reduced using the Cannizzaro reaction or by catalytic hydrogenation:

RC(O)CH_{3} + CH_{2}O → RC(O)CH_{2}CH_{2}OH
RC(O)CH_{2}CH_{2}OH + H_{2} → RCH(OH)CH_{2}CH_{2}OH

2,2-Disubstituted propane-1,3-diols are prepared in this way. Examples include 2-methyl-2-propyl-1,3-propanediol and neopentyl glycol.

1,3-Diols can be prepared by hydration of α,β-unsaturated ketones and aldehydes. The resulting keto-alcohol is hydrogenated. Another route involves the hydroformylation of epoxides followed by hydrogenation of the aldehyde. This method has been used for 1,3-propanediol from ethylene oxide.

More specialized routes to 1,3-diols involves the reaction between an alkene and formaldehyde, the Prins reaction. 1,3-diols can be produced diastereoselectively from the corresponding β-hydroxy ketones using the Evans–Saksena, Narasaka–Prasad or Evans–Tishchenko reduction protocols.

1,3-Diols are described as syn or anti depending on the relative stereochemistries of the carbon atoms bearing the hydroxyl functional groups. Zincophorin is a natural product that contains both syn and anti 1,3-diols.

Zincophorin depicting syn and anti-1,3-diol configurations

=== 1,4-, 1,5-, and longer diols ===
Diols where the hydroxyl groups are separated by several carbon centers are generally prepared by hydrogenation of diesters of the corresponding dicarboxylic acids:

(CH_{2})_{n}(CO_{2}R)_{2} + 4 H_{2} → (CH_{2})_{n}(CH_{2}OH)_{2} + 2 H_{2}O + 2 ROH

1,4-Butanediol, 1,5-pentanediol, 1,6-hexanediol, and 1,10-decanediol are important precursors to polyurethanes.

Bouveault-Blanc reduction of the diesters of long chain dicarboxylic acids affords the diterminal diols HOCH_{2}(CH_{2})_{n}CH_{2}OH for heptamethylene glycol (n = 5), nonamethylene glycol (n = 7), decamethylene glycol (n = 8), tridecamethylene glycol (n = 11), tetradecamethylene glycol (n = 12),octadecamethylene glycol (n = 16).

== Reactions ==
From the industrial perspective, the dominant reactions of the diols is in the production of polyurethanes and alkyd resins.

=== General diols ===
Diols react as alcohols, by esterification and ether formation.

Diols such as ethylene glycol are used as co-monomers in polymerization reactions forming polymers including some polyesters and polyurethanes. A different monomer with two identical functional groups, such as a dioyl dichloride or dioic acid is required to continue the process of polymerization through repeated esterification processes.

A diol can be converted to cyclic ether by using an acid catalyst, this is diol cyclization. Firstly, it involves protonation of the hydroxyl group. Then, followed by intramolecular nucleophilic substitution, the second hydroxyl group attacks the electron deficient carbon. Provided that there are enough carbon atoms that the angle strain is not too much, a cyclic ether can be formed.

A common diol reaction to produce a cyclic ether

1,2-diols and 1,3-diols can be protected using a protecting group. Protecting groups are used so that the functional group does not react to future reactions. Benzylidene groups are used to protect 1,3-diols. There are extremely useful in biochemistry as shown below of a carbohydrate derivative being protected.

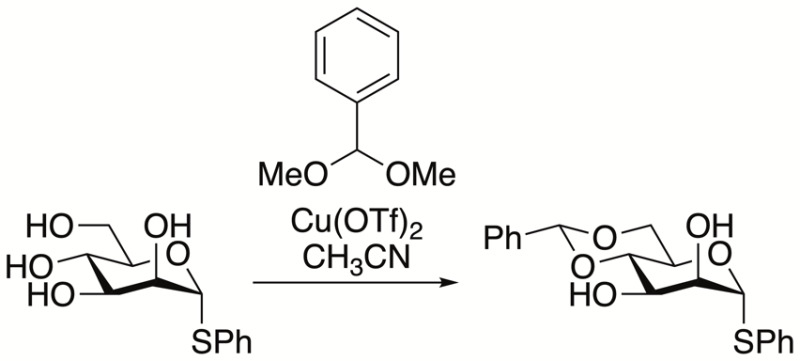
A reaction that protects 1,3-diol using a benzylidene group.

Diols can also be used to protect carbonyl groups. They are commonly used and are quite efficient at synthesizing cyclic acetals. These protect the carbonyl groups from reacting from any further synthesis until it is necessary to remove them. The reaction below depicts a diol being used to protect a carbonyl using zirconium tetrachloride.

Diols can also be converted to lactones employing the Fétizon oxidation reaction.

=== Vicinal diols ===
In glycol cleavage, the C−C bond in a vicinal diol is cleaved with formation of ketone or aldehyde functional groups. See Diol oxidation.

=== Geminal diols ===
In general, organic geminal diols readily dehydrate to form a carbonyl group.

== See also ==
- Alcohols, chemical compounds with at least one hydroxyl group
- Triols, chemical compounds with three hydroxyl groups
- Polyols, chemical compounds with multiple hydroxyl groups
- Ethylene glycol
- Glycol nucleic acid (GNA)
