= Good Foundations International =

US-based nonprofit organization

- Date founded: 1986
- Location of Headquarters: Boulder, Colorado
- Projects: Potters Teaching Potters Technical and Design Assistance Fuel Efficient Kilns Alternative Fuel Burners Ceramic Raw Materials Research Marketing Ceramic Water Purifiers
- Websites: www.pottersforpeace.org www.goodfoundationsinternational.org

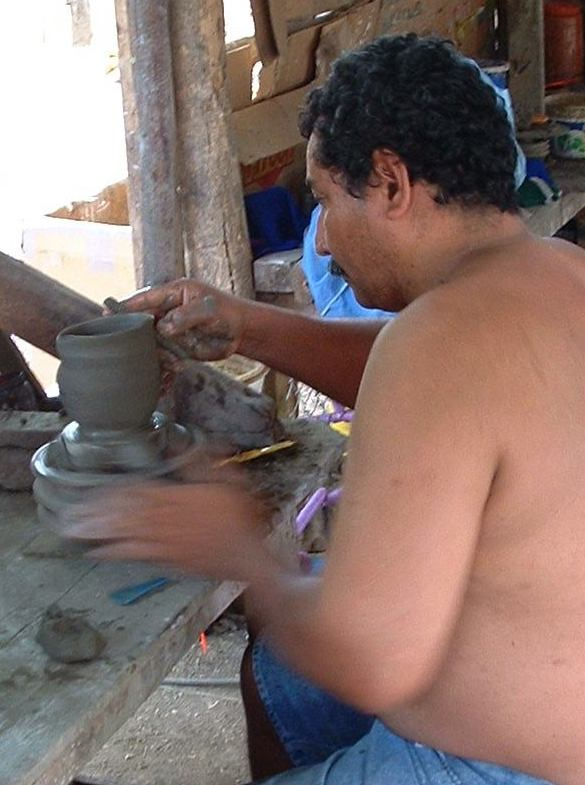
Potter at work

Good Foundations International (GFI), formerly known as Potters for Peace, is a nonprofit organization that has created a network of potters and other relevant parties to improve quality of life and preserve tradition using local skills and materials. GFI primarily works in Central America and has headquarters in Boulder, Colorado. GFI manages projects that help local potters to improve and market their products. GFI is best known for their work in water treatment, which has influenced water treatment systems worldwide. The treatment strategy follows a Point-of-Use (POU) water treatment design that uses ceramic water filters to remove pathogens and other contaminants from the water. This is generally a very effective method to remove bacteria from water, though there are some concerns about the ease of use and maintenance of the filtration units. Unlike other similar organizations, GFI does not manufacture these filters, but instead helps local communities to set up independent filter workshops to produce and sell the filters.

== Mission ==
Potters for Peace is clear to assert itself as an assistance organization, rather than an aid-based organization. Instead of simply solving the problem, GFI aims to provide sustainable solutions propelled by the goals of the individuals they work with. According to the Potters for Peace website, "Our goals are to offer support, solidarity and friendship to developing world potters; assist with appropriate technologies sustained using local skills and materials; help preserve cultural traditions; and assist in marketing locally, regionally and internationally".

== History ==
Potters for Peace (PFP) was founded in 1986 when a group of potters led by Mary Chapman and Dolly Pomerleau of the Quixote Center in Washington, DC, traveled to Nicaragua. The potters met with a female pottery/canning cooperative. This led to the first PFP fundraiser in Washington, DC. The program began to gain momentum after the Nicaraguan civil war to help pottery cooperatives. In 1988, the first contact in Nicaragua was made. A year later Steve Earp and Ron Rivera were sent. Ron Rivera helped make tenmoku glazed ceramics for electrical transmission lines. Over the next decade, PFP grew in size, finally receiving 501(c)(3) non-profit status in 1999 in the US. PFP later obtained non-governmental organization status in Nicaragua.

The best known PFP project, ceramic water filters, was begun when in 1998 Hurricane Mitch struck Central America. A filter workshop was set up in 1999. This workshop developed into an independent business that has implemented more than 40,000 filters in collaboration with several NGOs. PFP does not operate any filter workshops, but instead trains local potters to produce and distribute the filters.

== Potters Without Borders ==
Potters Without Borders registered as a non-profit society in British Columbia, Canada, in 2006 was formerly affiliated with Potters For Peace. PWB works in technical assistance to organizations and governments that wish to develop production of low cost ceramic water filters (CWF) for use in at-risk communities world wide. The organization conducts research to improve CWF production. PWB is based in Enderby, British Columbia, Canada, with offices in Clare, Nova Scotia.

== Projects ==
PFP has been active with several programs in Nicaragua since 1989. These programs emphasize the mission of PFP to help local potters succeed in their own right. Many of these projects center around helping potters market their products locally and abroad (PFP help organized an 18,000 piece sale to Pier 1 from a Nicaraguan cooperative, though this may have had negative long-term results) or use their skills to create new products that solve a local issue.

=== Potters Teaching Potters ===
The goals of the Potters Teaching Potters project is to share skills and knowledge about pottery. It allows campesina potters to travel in their country and abroad by providing transportation and expenses. Additionally, PFP finances scholarships for apprenticeships and holds conferences that bring together both Nicaraguan potters and also international buyers which help potters learn how to market their products abroad.

=== Technical and Design Assistance ===
As part of the Technical and Design Assistance program, Potters for Peace give access to necessary tools along with training on items such as energy-efficient kilns. Pottery designs are constantly being refined to fit the needs of their customers.

=== Fuel Efficient Kilns ===
The Fuel Efficient Kiln project was begun when volunteer Manny Hernandez designed a kiln that uses 50% less firewood to fire pottery. These kilns, called "Mani" kilns, have been built worldwide, totaling at least 60 so far.

=== Alternative Fuel Burners ===
Along with helping potters with starting up their practices, PFP helps maintain this profession by utilizing agricultural and construction waste as fuel for firing pottery as part of the Alternative Fuel Burners project. As firewood becomes more and more expensive, PFP keeps sustainability at the forefront of their projects by pushing for alternative and local fuels.

=== Ceramic Raw Materials Research ===
Potters for Peace has a materials research facility in Nicaragua where different combinations of ceramics are tested for their different properties for the Ceramic Raw Materials Research project. Also, PFP pays some of its potters to do their own materials research.

=== Marketing ===
Pieces made by these local potters are marketed in several ways. PFP developed a system of road signs that alert people to the availability of pottery. Funding is given for these potters to attend artisan fairs, where they show their wares and make connections.

=== Ceramic Water Purifiers ===
This colloidal-silver impregnated ceramic water filter was invented by Guatemalan chemist Fernando Mazariegos. Its first large-scale field study was conducted with over 500 Guatemalan families, organized by Dominique Wilson of AFA Guatemala. PFP coordinator Ron Rivera learned of the filter technology while working on a project with Dr. Fernando Mazariegos, then worked with Nicaraguan potters for years developing the filter from uneven hand-made to standardized press-molded, by inventing a sustainable-technology press operated by a hand-cranked car jack.

The manufacturing process is quite simple. A press forms the pot shape out of clay mixed with rice husks. The pot is fired, and the husk burns, leaving small holes that the water can run through. Finally the filters are coated with colloidal silver. The filters are used with plastic storage units to collect the water.

The efficacy of the PFP filter has been assessed by several independent organizations. It is reported to remove up to 99.9% of fecal coliform under laboratory conditions; however, this removal rate can vary greatly under usage in the field.

Efficacy of the CPW filters also depends on the flow rates through the filter. Lower flow rates have led to disuse of the filter. It is found that a filter manufactured with a clay to sawdust volume fraction of 1:1 was found optimal for field use. An elaborate study illustrated that the flow rate through the 1:1 CPW followed a hyperbolic relationship with time. This study also discussed the relationship between flow rate from the CPW filters and quantity of materials (Clay and Sawdust) used in the manufacture of the filters.

The long-term sustainability of CPWs has also been assessed. It has been found that the CPWs have a disuse rate of 2% per month, with 67% of this disuse resulting from filter breakage. This leads to a mean usage lifetime of 2 years. This may or may not be appropriate for a given situation. The strength of the ceramic water filter materials as a function on clay and organic materials like sawdust, ash etc. have been performed. Economics and supply chain would have to be assessed before considered CWPs as a solution to a water problem. Comparative cost analysis, efficacy and operation effectiveness of low cost clay-based water filters has been extensively reviewed, but results are difficult to generalize due to variability in the materials and recipes used.
