= Silver acetate =

Chemical compound with formula AgC2H3O2

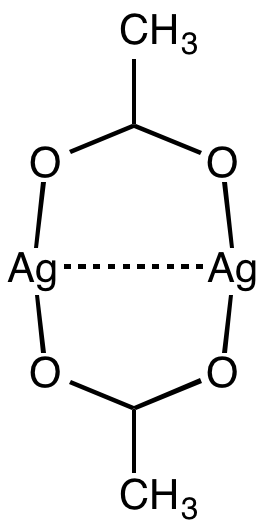
- Silver acetate

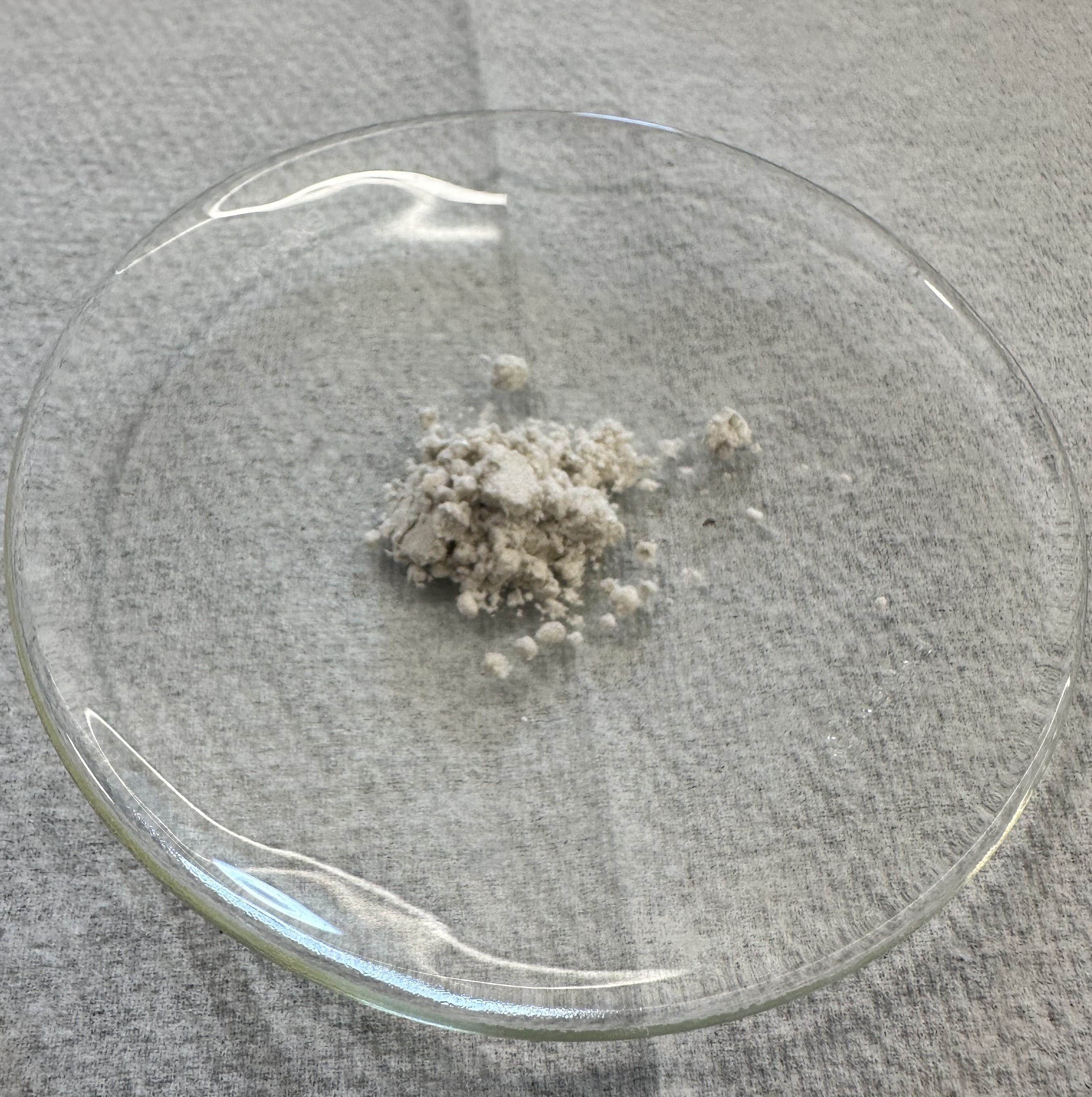

Names
- IUPAC name Silver(I) acetate
- Systematic IUPAC name Silver(I) ethanoate
- Other names Acetic acid, silver(I) salt Silver ethanoate Argentous acetate Argentous ethanoate

Identifiers
CAS Number	563-63-3
3D model (JSmol)	ionic monomer: Interactive image; coordination dimer without Ag-Ag bond: Interactive image; coordination dimer with Ag-Ag bond: Interactive image
ChemSpider	10772
ECHA InfoCard	100.008.414
EC Number	209-254-9
PubChem CID	11246
RTECS number	AJ4100000
UNII	19PPS85F9H
CompTox Dashboard (EPA)	DTXSID8032041
- InChI: InChI=1S/C2H4O2.Ag/c1-2(3)4;/h1H3,(H,3,4);/q;+1/p-1 Key: CQLFBEKRDQMJLZ-UHFFFAOYSA-M; InChI=1/C2H4O2.Ag/c1-2(3)4;/h1H3,(H,3,4);/q;+1/p-1 Key: CQLFBEKRDQMJLZ-REWHXWOFAJ
- SMILES: ionic monomer: CC(=O)[O-].[Ag+]; coordination dimer without Ag-Ag bond: C[C-]0O[Ag+]O[C-](C)O[Ag]O0; coordination dimer with Ag-Ag bond: C[C-]0O[Ag+]1O[C-](C)O[Ag]1O0

Properties
Chemical formula	AgC_{2}H_{3}O_{2}
Molar mass	166.912 g/mol
Appearance	white to slightly grayish powder slightly acidic odor
Density	3.26 g/cm^{3}, solid
Melting point	220 °C (428 °F; 493 K) (decomposes)
Solubility in water	1.02 g/100 mL(20 °C)
Solubility product (K_{sp})	1.94×10^{−3}
Magnetic susceptibility (χ)	−60.4·10^{−6} cm^{3}/mol

Hazards
- GHS labelling
Pictograms	(GHS07: Exclamation mark) (GHS09: Environmental hazard)
Signal word	Warning
Hazard statements	H315, H319, H335, H400
Precautionary statements	P261, P264, P271, P273, P280, P302+P352, P304+P340, P305+P351+P338, P312, P321, P332+P313, P337+P313, P362, P391, P403+P233, P405, P501
NFPA 704 (fire diamond)	1 0 0
- Except where otherwise noted, data are given for materials in their standard state (at 25 °C [77 °F], 100 kPa). verify (what is ?) Infobox references

Silver acetate is a coordination compound with the empirical formula CH_{3}CO_{2}Ag (or AgC_{2}H_{3}O_{2}). A photosensitive, white, crystalline solid, it is a useful reagent in the laboratory as a source of silver ions lacking an oxidizing anion.

== Synthesis and structure ==
Silver acetate can be synthesized by the reaction of acetic acid and silver carbonate.

2 CH_{3}CO_{2}H + Ag_{2}CO_{3} → 2 AgO_{2}CCH_{3} + H_{2}O + CO_{2}

Solid silver acetate precipitates upon concentration of solutions of silver nitrate and sodium acetate.

The structure of silver acetate consists of 8-membered Ag_{2}O_{4}C_{2} rings formed by a pair of acetate ligands bridging a pair of silver centres.

== Reactions ==
Silver acetate finds use in certain transformations in organic synthesis.

=== Sulfenamide synthesis ===
Silver acetate is used to prepare sulfenamides from disulfides and secondary amines:

R_{2}NH + AgOAc + (RS)_{2} → R_{2}NSR + AgSR + HOAc

=== Hydrogenation ===
A solution of silver acetate in pyridine absorbs hydrogen, producing metallic silver:

2 CH_{3}CO_{2}Ag + H_{2} → 2 Ag + 2 CH_{3}CO_{2}H

=== Direct ortho-arylation ===
Silver acetate is a reagent for direct ortho-arylation (to install two adjacent substituents on an aromatic ring) of benzylamines and N-methylbenzylamines. The reaction is palladium-catalyzed and requires a slight excess of silver acetate. This reaction is shorter than previous ortho-arylation methods.

=== Oxidative dehalogenation ===
Silver acetate can be used to convert certain organohalogen compounds into alcohols. It may be used, in spite of its high cost, in instances where a mild and selective reagent is desired.

=== Woodward cis-hydroxylation ===
Silver acetate in combination with iodine forms the basis of the Woodward cis-hydroxylation. This reaction selectively converts an alkene into a cis-diol.

== Uses ==
In the health field, silver acetate-containing products have been used in gum, spray, and lozenges to deter smokers from smoking. The silver in these products, when mixed with smoke, creates an unpleasant metallic taste, thus deterring them from smoking. Lozenges containing 2.5 mg of silver acetate showed "modest efficacy" on 500 adult smokers tested over a three-month period. However, over a period of 12 months, prevention failed. In 1974, silver acetate was first introduced in Europe as an over-the-counter smoking-deterrent lozenge (Repaton) and then three years later as a chewing gum (Tabmint).

Silver acetate is also a well known precursor used in printed electronics. Particularly, complexes of silver acetate have been reported to form particle free "reactive inks" that form traces that approach bulk silver conductivity (within one order of magnitude).

== Safety ==
The LD_{50} of silver acetate in mice is 36.7 mg/kg. Low doses of silver acetate in mice produced hyper-excitability, ataxia, central nervous system depression, labored breathing, and even death. The U.S. FDA recommends that silver acetate intake be limited to 756 mg over a short period of time; excessive intake may cause argyria.
