= Platner =

Platner may refer to:

== Places ==
- Platner, Colorado

== People ==
- Ernst Platner (1744–1818), German anthropologist, physician, and philosopher
- Ernst Zacharias Platner (1773–1855), German painter and writer, son of the foregoing
- Graham Platner (born 1984), American political candidate and oyster farmer
- Samuel Ball Platner (1863–1921), U.S. classicist and archaeologist
- Warren Platner (1919–2006), U.S. architect and interior designer

== See also ==
- Plattner
