= Ceramic water filter =

Fine-pored filter used for purifying water

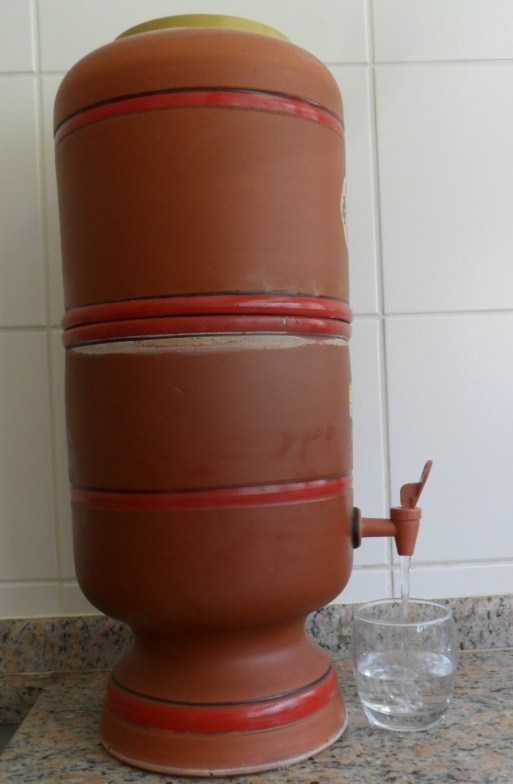
Pot-type ceramic water filter dispensing clean water into a glass.

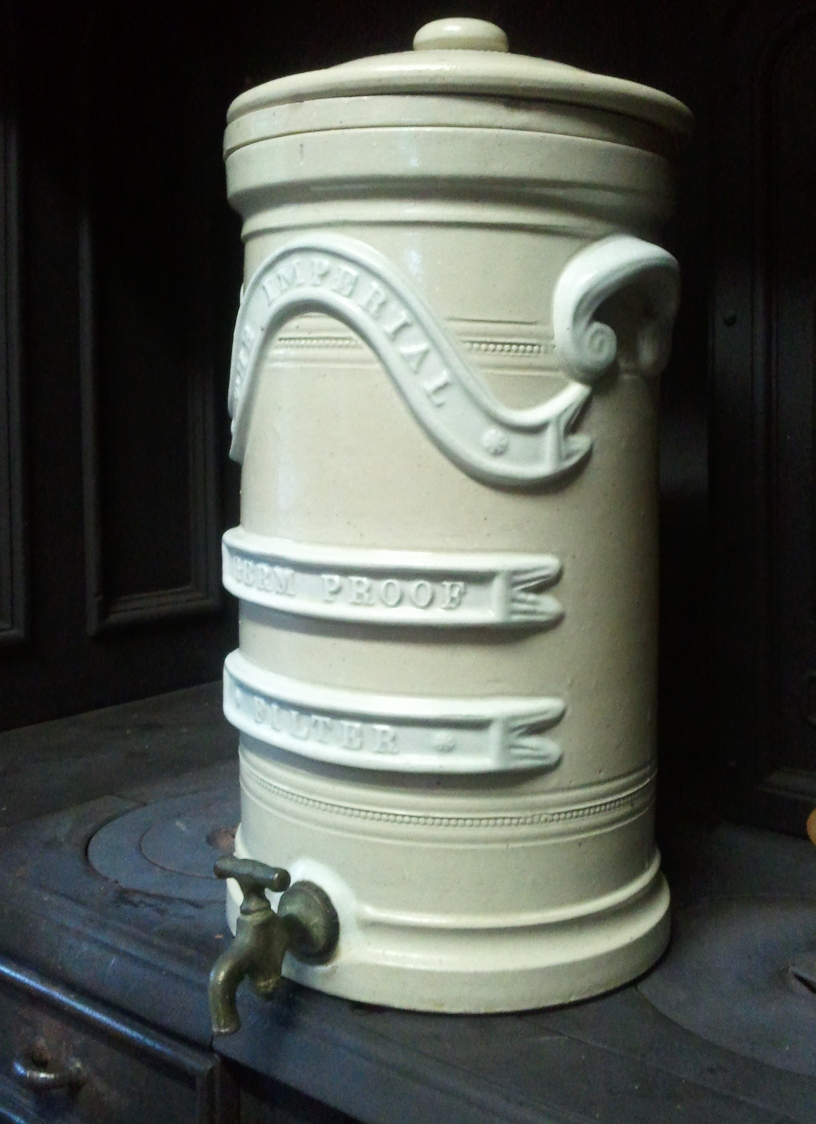
A Victorian ceramic water filter

Ceramic water filters (CWF) are an inexpensive and effective type of water filter that rely on the small pore size of ceramic material to filter dirt, debris, and bacteria out of water. This makes them ideal for use in developing countries, and portable ceramic filters are commonly used in backpacking.

== Method of action ==
Similar to other methods of filtering water, the filter removes particles larger than the size of the pores in the filter material. Typically bacteria, protozoa, and microbial cysts are removed. However, filters are typically not effective against viruses since they are small enough to pass through to the "clean" side of the filter. Ceramic water filters (CWF) may be treated with silver in a form that will not leach away. The silver helps to kill or incapacitate bacteria and prevent the growth of mold and algae in the body of the filter.

Ceramic filtration does not remove chemical contaminants, per se. However, some manufacturers (especially of ceramic candle filters) incorporate a high-performance activated carbon core inside the ceramic filter cartridge that reduces organic and metallic contaminants. The active carbon absorbs compounds such as chlorine. Filters with active carbon need to be replaced periodically because the carbon becomes clogged with foreign material.

The two most common types of ceramic water filter are pot-type and candle-type filters.

=== Pot-type ===
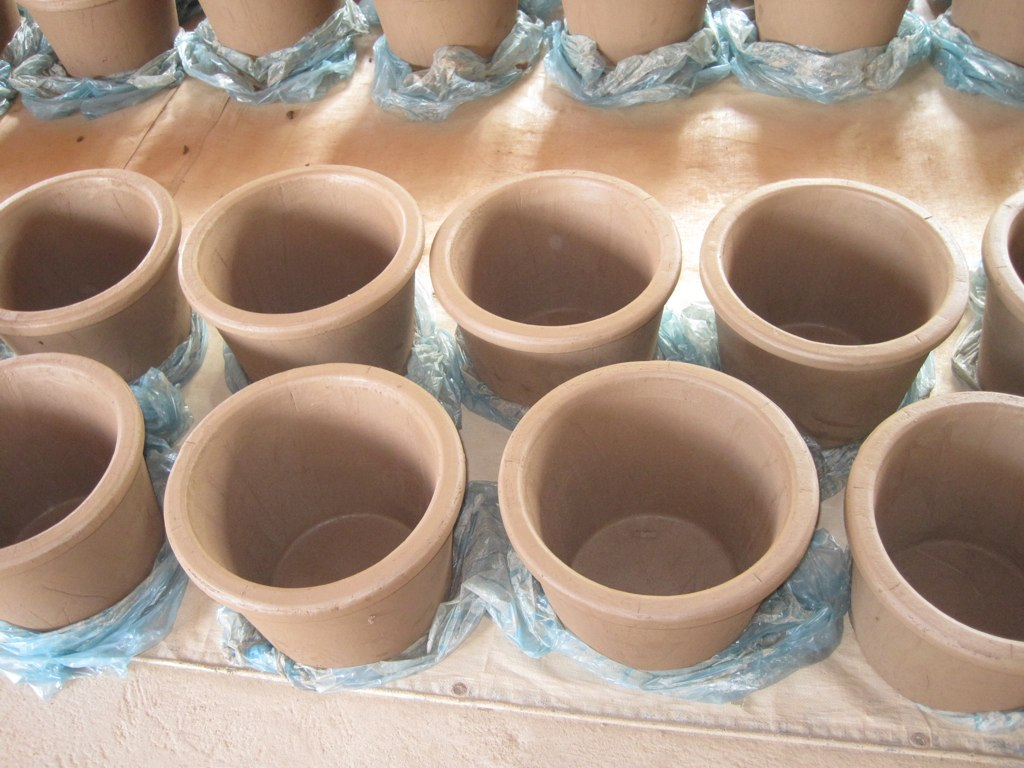
Ceramic filters

Ceramic filter systems consist of a porous ceramic filter that is attached to, or sits on top of a plastic or ceramic receptacle. Contaminated water is poured into a top container. It passes through the filter (or multiple filters) into the receptacle below. The lower receptacle usually is fitted with a tap.

Contaminants larger than the minute holes of the ceramic structure will remain in the top half of the unit. The filters can be cleaned by brushing them with a soft brush and rinsing them with clean water. Hot water and soap can also be used.

=== Candle-type ===
In stationary use, ceramic candles have mechanical, operational and manufacturing advantages over simple inserts and pots. Filter candles allow sturdy metal and plastic receptacles to be used, which decreases the likelihood of a sanitary failure. Since their filter area is independent of the size of the attachment joint, there is less leakage than other geometries of replaceable filter, and more-expensive, higher-quality gaskets can be used. Since they are protected by the upper receptacle, rather than forming it, they are less likely to be damaged in ordinary use. They are easier to sanitize, because the sanitary side is inside the candle. The non-sanitary part is outside, where it is easy to clean. They fit more types of receptacles and applications than simple pots, and attach to a simple hole in a receptacle. They also can be replaced without replacing the entire upper receptacle, and larger receptacles can simply use more filter candles, permitting filter manufacture to be standardized. If a filter in a multifilter receptacle is found to be broken, the filter hole can be plugged, and use can continue with fewer filters and a longer refill-time until a replacement can be obtained. Also, standardizing the filter makes it economical to keep one or a few filters on hand.

=== Other types ===
There are also portable ceramic filters, such as the MSR Miniworks, which work via manual pumping, and in-line ceramic filters, which filters drinking water that comes through household plumbing. Cleaning these filters is the same as with the clay pot filter but also allows for reverse-flow cleaning, wherein clean water is forced through the filter backwards, pushing any contaminants out of the ceramic pores.

=== Maintenance ===
The major risks to the success of all forms of ceramic filtration are hairline cracks and cross-contamination. If the unit is dropped or otherwise abused, the brittle nature of ceramic materials can allow fine, barely visible cracks, allowing larger contaminants through the filter. Work is being done to modify clay/sawdust ratios during manufacture to improve the brittle nature and fracture toughness of these clay ceramic water filter materials.

If the "clean" water side of the ceramic membrane is brought into contact with dirty water, hands, cleaning cloths, etc., then the filtration will be ineffective. If such contact occurs, the clean side of the filter should be thoroughly sterilized before reuse.

== Development and expansion ==
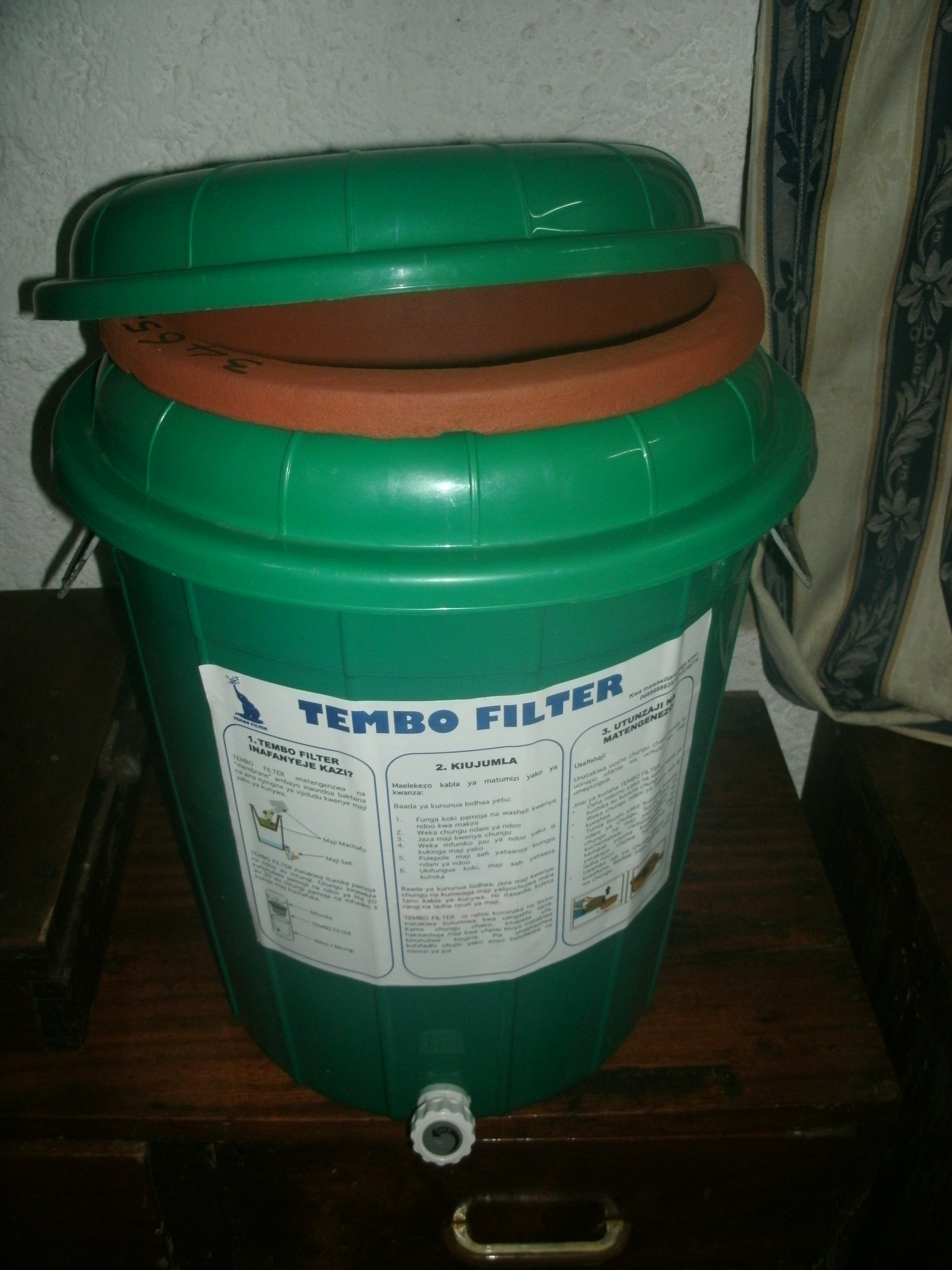
Modern ceramic water filter pot, manufactured by MSABI.

Henry Doulton invented the modern form of ceramic candle sanitary water filter in 1827. In 1835, Queen Victoria commissioned him to produce such a device for her personal use. By 1846, Doulton ceramics was widely recognized as a premier manufacturer of an effective prevention device for treating infective water. In 1887, Doulton was knighted, in part for his work with water filters. Louis Pasteur's research concerning bacteria also had provided a demonstrable reason for the filters' effect. Doulton's original organization for water filters remains in existence, although it has been sold and renamed several times. "Doulton" is currently (2013) a registered trademark of Fairey Ceramics.

Several universities including MIT; Universities of Colorado; Princeton University; University of Wisconsin-Milwaukee; The Ohio State University; Universities of Tulane, West Virginia, North Carolina in the US; University of Delft, Strathclyde in Europe, USAID, UNICEF, Zamorano University in Honduras, Rafael Landívar University in Guatemala, Earth University, Institute of Hydraulic resources, the Red Cross, Engineers Without Borders, United Nations, countries in Africa like Nigeria, Ghana, Burkina Faso, Kenya, etc. and countries in Asia like Nepal, Bangladesh, Cambodia, Sri Lanka, India, Vietnam, Uganda etc. and NGOs are supporting the expansion of the use of ceramic filters in drinking water development initiatives; most commonly, in the form of clay pot filters.

Fernando Mazariegos of Guatemala was responsible for developing Ceramic Pot Filter technology in 1981 while Director of Water Research at the Central American Research Institute in Guatemala City. He was the Director of Research and Development at Ecofiltro in Antigua, Guatemala. Ron Rivera studied under Fernando Mazariegos of Guatemala and was a key proponent and innovator in the field as part of the group to take the ceramic frustum shaped(pot) filter across international borders and helped developing nations to provide cheap high quality potable water. Ron Rivera also worked with Potters for Peace worldwide for the good and benefit of clay workers in developing nations to sustain their businesses.

The latest development is in India, NGOs such as Enactus IIT Madras, Rupayan Sansthan, Sehgal Foundation are supporting the expansion and use of indigenized frustum shaped ceramic water filters called Matikalp for drinking water development initiatives in Tamil Nadu, Rajasthan, Bihar and other states.

In Africa, Uganda Spouts of Water works in collaboration with local communities and partners to produce and distribute ceramic water filters (Purifaaya) made from locally available materials.

== See also ==
- List of water supply and sanitation by country
- Chamberland filter
