= Woodward cis-hydroxylation =

Chemical reaction

Named after	Robert Burns Woodward
Reaction type	addition reaction

Identifiers
Organic Chemistry Portal	woodward-reaction

The Woodward cis-hydroxylation (also known as the Woodward reaction) is the chemical reaction of alkenes with iodine and silver acetate in wet acetic acid to form cis-diols.(conversion of olefin into cis-diol)

The reaction is named after its discoverer, Robert Burns Woodward.

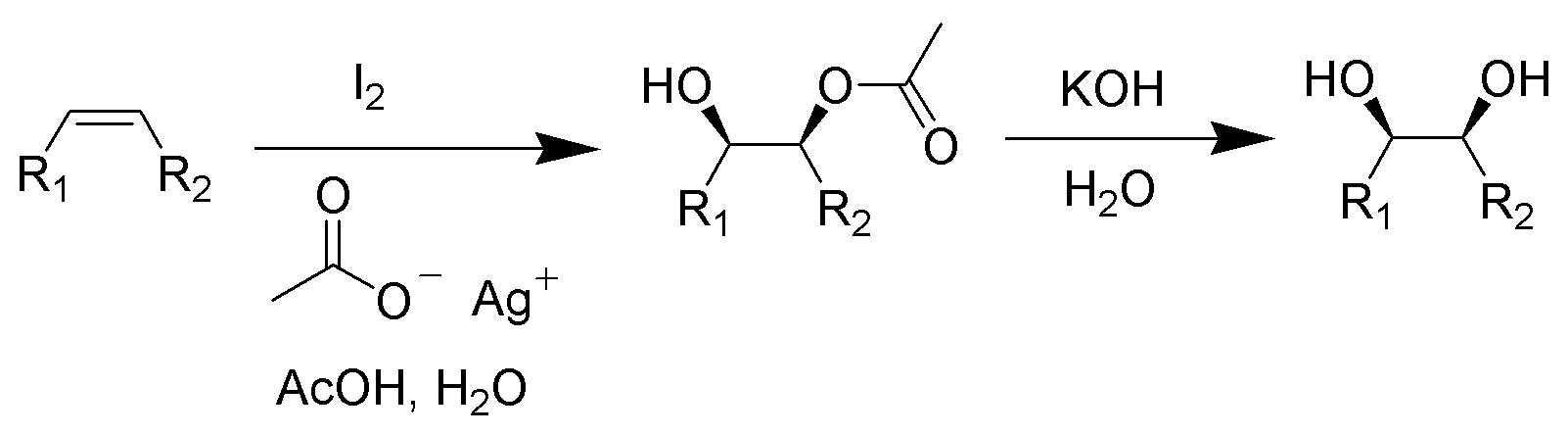
The Woodward cis-hydroxylation

This reaction has found application in steroid synthesis.

== Reaction mechanism ==
The reaction of the iodine with the alkene is promoted by the silver acetate, thus forming an iodinium ion (3). The iodinium ion is opened via S_{N}2 reaction by acetic acid (or silver acetate) to give the first intermediate, the iodo-acetate (4). Through anchimeric assistance, the iodine is displaced via another S_{N}2 reaction to give an oxonium ion (5), which is subsequently hydrolyzed to give the mono-ester (6).

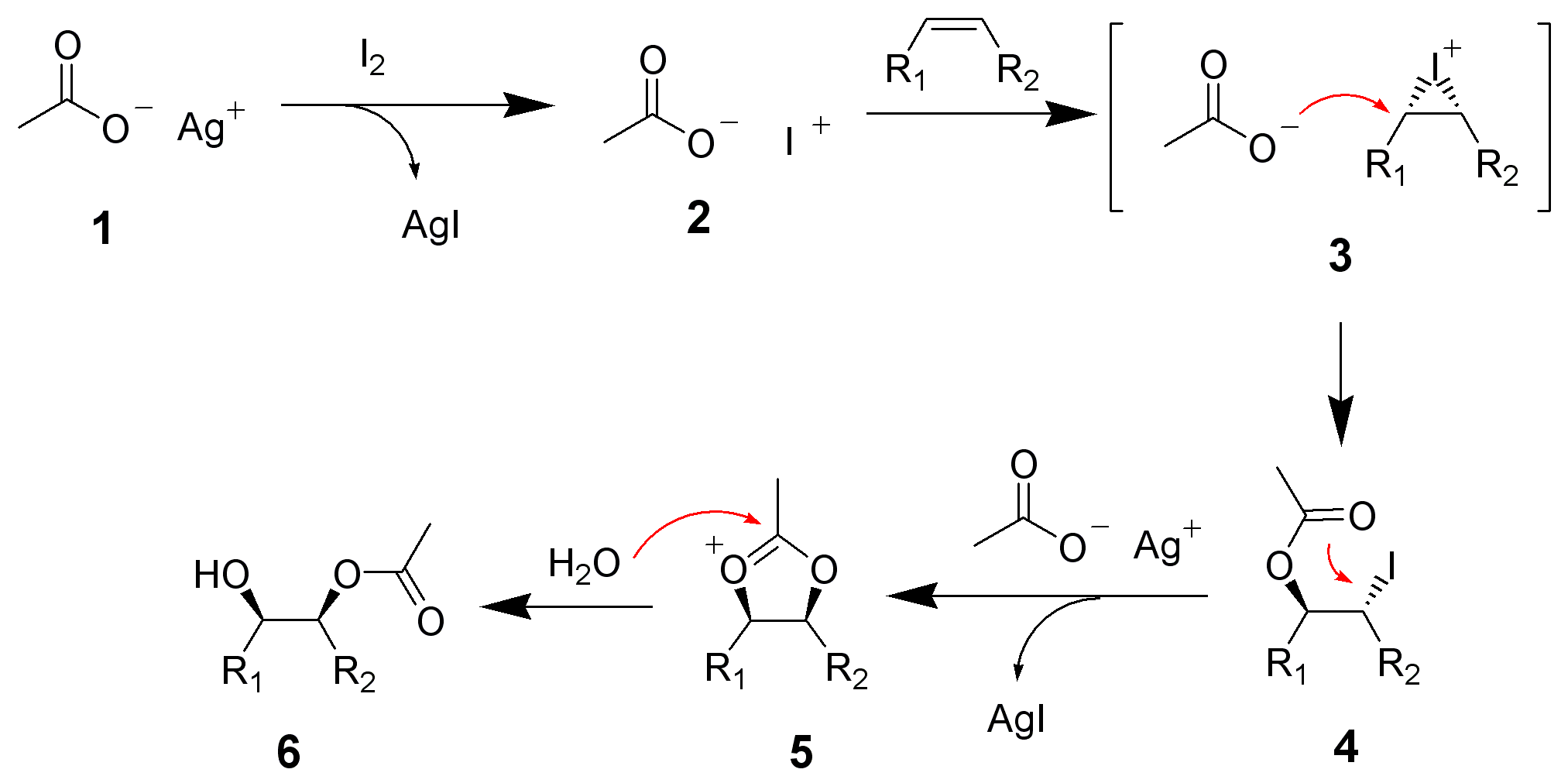
The mechanism of the Woodward cis-hydroxylation

== See also ==
- Prévost reaction
