= The World University (Puerto Rico) =

In operation from 1965 to 1989

World University was an accredited university based in Puerto Rico, which was in operation from 1965 to 1989.

The University was founded by Ronald C. Bauer, President of World University (aka: International Institute of the Americas – World University ó Instituto Internacional de las Américas de la Universidad Mundial). Mrs. Flor Amelia Garcia Marrero, was the Administrative Secretary for twenty years until the closure of the University in 1989. The University was accredited by the Middle States Association of Colleges and Universities and the Council of Puerto Rico Accreditation of Higher Learning. World University offered Technological, Bachelor, Master and PhD degrees in the Natural Sciences (Biology, Chemistry and Environmental Science), Business, Health, Psychology and Education. World University had physical facilities in Ponce, Hato Rey, and Bayamon, Puerto Rico. The university had affiliations Washington International College, International Graduate School, Western International University, World University, Inc.-Miami, Universidad Mundial Dominicana Medical School, Universidad Mundial Dominicana (undergraduate programs), Universidad Nacional Autonoma de la Republica de la Republica Dominicana, and World University in Haiti. World University was a dynamic, innovative unmatched institution of higher learning. One of its unique and original courses, Dev. of World Cultures was unparalleled introducing the students to a universe of knowledge in the fields of religion, music, philosophy, science, and technology. The University delivered instructions in traditional physical classrooms, specialized learning spaces, off-campus locations, virtual instructional locations (synchronous, asynchronous, mail correspondence), and Prior Learning Assessment (PLA), or in Blended Format.

There are/were many notable graduates from this institution. Two notable alumni were public health innovator Ron Rivera and Prof., Rev. Richard Salvatore Esposito, Ph.B, MSc., L.O.C.M.., Class of 1978. Prof. Esposito has enjoyed a Worldwide speaking career highlighted by addressing, by special invitation, the United Nations in two special sessions in Geneva, Switzerland. He sat under the teachings of the highly respected Dr. Lorraine Casby, Ph.D, Ed.D. 1974–1978. Graduated with Honors.
