= 1,10-Decanediol =

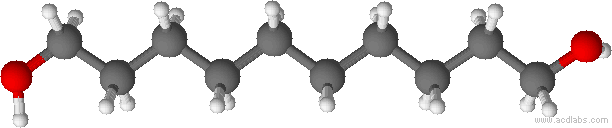

Names
- Preferred IUPAC name Decane-1,10-diol

Identifiers
CAS Number	112-47-0
3D model (JSmol)	Interactive image
ChemSpider	34095
ECHA InfoCard	100.003.614
EC Number	203-975-2
PubChem CID	37153
UNII	5I577UDK52
CompTox Dashboard (EPA)	DTXSID3059420
- InChI: InChI=1S/C10H22O2/c11-9-7-5-3-1-2-4-6-8-10-12/h11-12H,1-10H2 Key: FOTKYAAJKYLFFN-UHFFFAOYSA-N
- SMILES: OCCCCCCCCCCO

Properties
Chemical formula	C_{10}H_{22}O_{2}
Molar mass	174.284 g·mol^{−1}
Appearance	White solid
Density	1.08 g·cm^{−3}
Melting point	70–73°C; 81.7 °C Heat of fusion = 44.0 kJ·mol^{−1} (252.6 J·g^{−1}).
Boiling point	297 °C (1013 hPa); 170 °C (11 hPa)
Solubility in water	Poorly soluble
- Except where otherwise noted, data are given for materials in their standard state (at 25 °C [77 °F], 100 kPa). Infobox references

1,10-Decanediol is an organic compound diol with the chemical formula (HOCH_{2}(CH_{2})_{8}CH_{2}OH. It is a white solid with limited solubility in water.
