= Antibiotic properties of nanoparticles =

Nanoparticles have been studied extensively for their antimicrobial properties in order to fight super bug bacteria. Several characteristics in particular make nanoparticles strong candidates as a traditional antibiotic drug alternative. Firstly, they have a high surface area to volume ratio, which increases contact area with target organisms. Secondly, they may be synthesized from polymers, lipids, and metals. Thirdly, a multitude of chemical structures, such as fullerenes and metal oxides, allow for a diverse set of chemical functionalities.

The key to nanoparticle efficacy against antibiotic resistant strains of bacteria lies in their small size. On the nano scale, particles can behave as molecules when interacting with a cell which allows them to easily penetrate the cell membrane and interfere in vital molecular pathways if the chemistry is possible. While their antibiotic properties against certain pathogens are important, oral antibiotics packaged in lipid nanoparticles can reduce collateral damage on the gut microbiota.

== Metal Nanoparticles ==
A strong research focus has been placed on triggering production of excessive reactive oxygen species (ROS) using nanoparticles injected into bacterial cells. The presence of excessive ROS can stress the cell structure leading to damaged DNA/RNA, decreased membrane activity, disrupted metabolic activity, and harmful side reactions generating chemicals such as peroxides. ROS production has been induced generally through the introduction of both metal oxide and positively charged metal nanoparticles in the cell, such as iron oxides and silver. The positive charge of the metal is attracted to the negative charge of the cell membrane which it then easily penetrates. Redox reactions take place in the cell between the metals and oxygen containing species in the cell to produce ROS. Other novel techniques include utilizing quantum dots such as cadmium telluride, under a bright light source to excite and release electrons; this process initializes ROS production similar to the metal nanoparticles.

== Carbon Structures ==
Carbon nanostructures such as graphene oxide (GO) sheets, nano tubes, and fullerenes have proven antimicrobial properties when used synergistically with other methods. UV radiation directed at GO sheets, for example, disrupts bacterial cell activity and colony growth via ROS production. Doping nano tubes or fullerenes with silver or copper nanoparticles may also harm the cells ability to grow and replicate DNA. Nano tubes and fullerenes in particular are being studied as aqueous dispersions rather than polymers, metals or other traditional dry solid particulates. The exact mechanism which promotes this synergy is not clearly understood but it is believed to be linked to the unique surface chemistry of carbon nanostructures (i.e. the large aspect ratio of carbon nanotubes, high surface energy in GO sheets). Human applications of carbon nano materials have not been tested due to the unknown potential hazards. Current research on the carcinogenic effects, if any, of carbon nanostructures is still in its infancy and there is therefore no clear consensus on the topic.

== Drug Synergies ==
Nanoparticles can enhance the effects of traditional antibiotics which a bacterium may have become resistant to, and decrease the overall minimum inhibitory concentration (MIC) required for a drug. Silver nanoparticles improve the activity of amoxicillin, penicillin, and gentamicin in bacteria by altering membrane permeability and improving drug delivery. nanoparticles themselves may have antimicrobial properties enhanced or induced with the addition of organic drugs. Gold particles, while not inherently antimicrobial, were discovered to express antimicrobial properties when functionalized with ampicillin. In addition to this, gold nanoparticles demonstrated improved membrane permeability with the addition of 4,6-diamino-2-pyrimidenthiol (DAPT) and non-antibiotic amines (NAA) to their surfaces.
