= Fernando Mazariegos =

Guatemalan scientist (1938–2018)

Fernando Mazariegos OQ
- Born: José Fernando Mazariegos Anleu; 21 March 1938; Panajachel, Guatemala
- Died: 2 June 2018 (aged 80); Guatemala City, Guatemala
- Education: University of San Carlos of Guatemala
- Known for: Inventor of "Ecofilter"
- Awards: Order of the Quetzal (2017); Guatemalteco Ilustre (2010)
- Scientific career
- Fields: Pharmaceutical chemistry
- Workplaces: Instituto Centroamericano de Investigación y Tecnología Industrial

José Fernando Mazariegos Anleu (21 March 1938 – 2 June 2018) was a Guatemalan inventor, recognized in several countries in Latin America, Asia and Africa, for the creation of the drinking water filter called "Ecofilter", which was developed in 1990 as part of a project of the Central American Institute of Industrial Research and Technology.

== Biography ==
Mazariegos was born in Panajachel, Sololá on 3 March 1938. He graduated in pharmaceutical chemistry from the University of San Carlos of Guatemala, and specialized in quality control at the French Association for Standardization and Quality Control. His professional development was carried out at the Central American Institute for Research and Industrial Technology, an institution that allowed him to share his knowledge in favor of environmental development in the urban centers of the Central American region, where he conducted a series of seminars and projects for municipalities. For his research he has traveled to Argentina, France, Mexico and the United States.

== The Ecofilter ==
The objective of the Ecofilter was to obtain potable water at low cost, taking advantage of raw materials and local technology. The project consisted in the elaboration of a drinking water filter that provides 83 liters a week of pure water, through a homemade filter manufactured. It worked on the technological development applied to the use of materials and materials that favored the filtration process. As he said: "Our project consisted in the elaboration of a drinking water filter that provides 22 American gallons (83.2 L) a week of pure water, using a homemade filter manufactured at low cost. We did not invent filtration, but worked on the technological development that was applied to the use of materials and materials that favored the process".

Dominique Wilson, with AFA Guatemala, conducted a large field study of the filter with over 500 Guatemalan families, showing that use of the filter reduced incidence of diarrhea in half in children under the age of five. Diarrhea is the leading cause of death in this population.

The filter was developed in order to put it at the service of the population, and is already used in countries in Africa, Asia, the Caribbean and South America. Paradoxically, in Colombia its acceptance is difficult. One of the most responsible for the extension of the use of these filters was Ron Rivera with his organization Potters For Peace.

== Awards ==
The favorable results allowed him to obtain the award granted by the Latin American Association of Sanitary and Environmental Engineering, and the Market Place Award for Sustainable Technology (2003 and 2004), awarded by the World Bank, due to his contribution to humanity.
