= Samarium iodide =

Samarium iodide may refer to:

- samarium(II) iodide (samarium diiodide), SmI_{2}
- samarium(III) iodide (samarium triiodide), SmI_{3}
