= Evans–Saksena reduction =

The Saksena–Evans reduction is a diastereoselective reduction of β-hydroxy ketones to the corresponding anti-dialcohols, employing the reagent tetramethylammonium triacetoxyborohydride (Me_{4}NHB(OAc)_{3}). The reaction was first described by Anil K. Saksena in 1983 and further developed by David A. Evans in 1987.

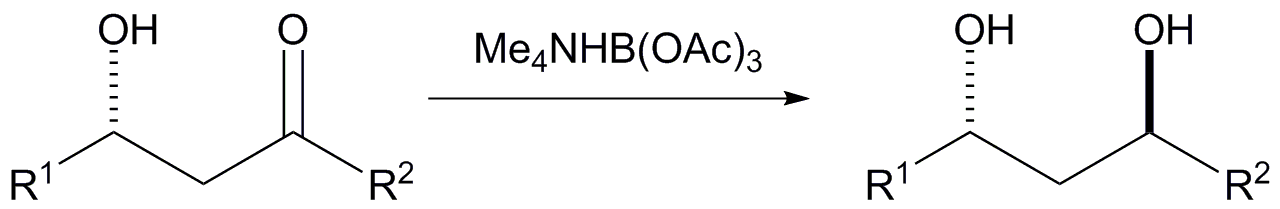
Scheme for the Evans-Saksena reduction

The reaction is thought to proceed through the 6-membered ring transition state shown below. The intramolecular hydride delivery from the boron reducing agent forces the reduction to proceed from the opposite face of the chelating β-alcohol, thus determining the diastereoselectivity.

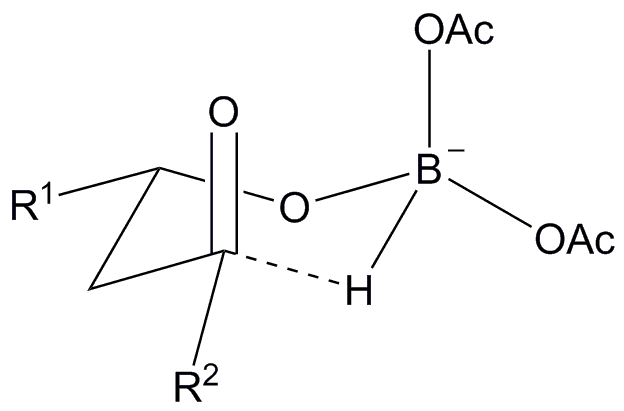
Transition state for the Evans-Saksena reduction showing the reason for the observed diastereoselectivity

This can be contrasted with the Narasaka–Prasad reduction which similarly employs a boron chelating agent but undergoes an intermolecular hydride delivery, favouring the corresponding syn-diol product.

The Saksena-Evans reduction has since been used in the synthesis of several products, particularly the bryostatins.

== See also ==
- Evans–Tishchenko reaction
