= Ron Rivera (public health) =

American health activist (1948–2008)

Ronald Rivera
- Born: August 22, 1948; New York City, New York
- Died: September 3, 2008 (aged 60); Managua, Nicaragua
- Education: The World University in Puerto Rico
- Spouse: Kathy McBride
- Scientific career
- Fields: Public health

Notes
- Rivera began manufacturing the pots through Potters for Peace

Ronald Rivera (August 22, 1948 – September 3, 2008) was an American activist of Puerto Rican descent who is best known for promoting an inexpensive ceramic water filter developed in Guatemala by the chemist Fernando Mazariegos and used to treat gray water in impoverished communities and for establishing community-based factories to produce the filters around the world.

== Early years ==
Rivera was born in the Bronx borough of New York City, of Puerto Rican parents. He was raised in both New York City and Puerto Rico. Rivera graduated from The World University in San Juan, Puerto Rico. He also studied at the School for International Training.

Rivera worked with the Peace Corps in Panama and Ecuador, and with Catholic Relief Services in Bolivia. He founded the local consultancy office for the Inter American Foundation in Ecuador where he worked until 1988, when he moved to Nicaragua.

== Career and work with ceramics ==
Rivera first became passionate about ceramics in the early 1970s when he studied in Cuernavaca, Mexico with Paulo Freire and Ivan Illich, who taught that human beings had lost their connection with the earth. Rivera then went to live with an experienced potter and learned the art of ceramics.

After moving to Nicaragua in the late 1980s during the Contra War, where he reunited with and eventually married his high-school sweetheart, Kathy McBride, Rivera worked for over two decades with potters from rural communities in Nicaragua, helping them to enhance their production methods, including the implementation of a more fuel-efficient kiln developed by Manny Hernandez, a professor at Northern Illinois University. He also worked with potters around the country to develop new designs and to connect to new markets.

== Ceramic water filter ==
He first learned of ceramic pot filters from its inventor Guatemalan chemist Fernando Mazariegos. Rivera produced this inexpensive filter developed in Guatemala by Mr. Mazariegos from a mix of local terra-cotta clay and sawdust or other combustible materials, such as rice husks. The combustible ingredient, which has been milled and screened, burns out in the firing, leaving a network of fine pores. After firing, the filter is coated with colloidal silver. This combination of fine pore size and the bactericidal properties of colloidal silver produce an effective filter, killing over 98 percent of the contaminants that cause diarrhea, thus dramatically reducing public health problems in the communities that use them to purify potable water. He designed a mold for the filter and a special clay press that was operated with a tire jack.

The Family of the Americas Association, a Guatemalan organization, conducted a one-year follow-up study on the initial Mazariegos-developed filter project, concluding that this filter helped to reduce the incidence of diarrhea in participating households by as much as 50 percent. Laboratory testing and field studies have been performed on the filter by various institutions, including MIT, Tulane University, University of Colorado and University of North Carolina.

Rivera began manufacturing the pots through Potters for Peace in Nicaragua, eventually helping to establish an independent enterprise to produce the filters.

Beginning in 1998, Rivera traveled throughout Latin America, Africa and Asia to establish 30 filter microenterprises in Guatemala, Honduras, Mexico, Cambodia, Bangladesh, Ghana, Nigeria, El Salvador, the Darfur region of Sudan, Myanmar and other countries. These factories have produced over 300,000 filters, and the filters are used by about 1.5 million people to date. An additional 13 filter workshops are scheduled to begin operating by the end of next year.

The filter has been cited by the United Nations’ Appropriate Technology Handbook, and tens of thousands of filters have been distributed worldwide by organizations such as International Federation of the Red Cross and Red Crescent, Doctors Without Borders, UNICEF, Plan International, Project Concern International, International Development Enterprises, Oxfam and USAID.

Rivera wanted to share this Guatemalan invention with the world and posted his experience in manufacturing ceramic pot filters in painstaking detail, on the Internet.

== Written work ==
Ron Rivera, Lynette Yetter, Jeff Rogers and Reid Harvey co-authored the paper, "A Sustainable Ceramic Water Filter for Household Purification," which Lynette Yetter presented at a NSF Conference in 2000.

== Legacy ==
Rivera's filters were included in an exhibition at the Cooper-Hewitt National Design Museum called "Design for the Other 90 Percent."

Rivera died in Managua, Nicaragua on September 3, 2008, after contracting falciparum malaria while working in Nigeria. A memorial service held in Managua on September 6 at the Universidad Centroamericana was attended by hundreds, including scores of local potters. During his stay in Nigeria he worked endlessly to put together a ceramic water filter factory.

== See also ==
- List of Puerto Ricans
- Puerto Rican scientists and inventors
