= Charles Prévost (chemist) =

French chemist

Charles Prévost (English: /preɪˈvoʊ/ pray-VOH, French: [ʃaʁl pʁevo]) was a French chemist. He was born on 20 March 1899 at Champlitte, Haute-Saône and died in 1983.

== Biography ==
Prévost was the son of Georges Prévost (1873–1959) and Marie Zimmermann (1873–1932). He married Eléonore Fumée (1899–1966), with whom he had two children. After studying at Lycée Louis-le-Grand he was a student from 1919 to 1923 at the École Normale Supérieure and at the University of Paris. In 1923 he entered the agrégation in physical sciences and spent six years as an assistant at the École Navale. In 1928 he received his doctorate in physical sciences. From 1929 to 1933 he was a lecturer in Nancy, then becoming a professor of chemistry; from 1936 to 1937 he was a professor at Lille. In November of that year he became maître de conférences (senior lecturer) for physical, chemical and natural sciences at the Faculté des sciences de Paris; then in 1941 he transferred to be maître de conferences for organic chemistry. In 1953 he was made chair of organic chemistry.

== See also ==
- Prévost reaction
