= Fürst–Plattner rule =

Rule in organic chemistry

The Fürst–Plattner rule (also known as the trans-diaxial effect) describes the stereoselective addition of nucleophiles to cyclohexene derivatives.

== Introduction ==
Cyclohexene derivatives, such as imines, epoxides, and halonium ions, react with nucleophiles in a stereoselective fashion, affording trans-diaxial addition products. The term “Trans-diaxial addition” describes the mechanism of the addition, however the products are likely to equilibrate by ring flip to the lower energy conformer, placing the new substituents in the equatorial position.

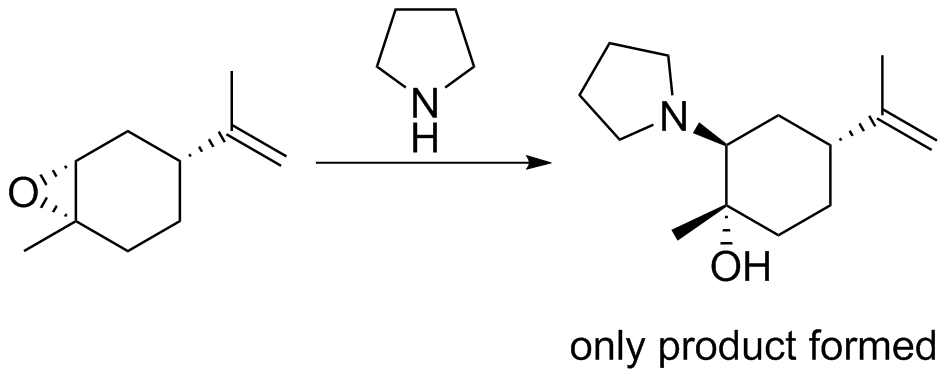

== Mechanism and stereochemistry ==
Epoxidation of a substituted cyclohexene affords a product where the R group resides in the pseudo-equatorial position. Nucleophilic ring-opening of this class of epoxides can occur by an attack at either the C1 or C2-position. It is well known that nucleophilic ring-opening reactions of these substrates can proceed with excellent regioselectivity. The Fürst–Plattner rule attributes this regiochemical control to a large preference for the reaction pathway that follows the more stable chair-like transition state (attack at the C1-position) compared to the one proceeding through the unfavored twist boat-like transition state (attack at the C2-position). The attack at the C1-position follows a substantially lower reaction barrier of around 5 kcal mol^{–1} depending on the specific conditions. Similarly, the Fürst–Plattner rule applies to nucleophilic additions to imines and halonium ions.

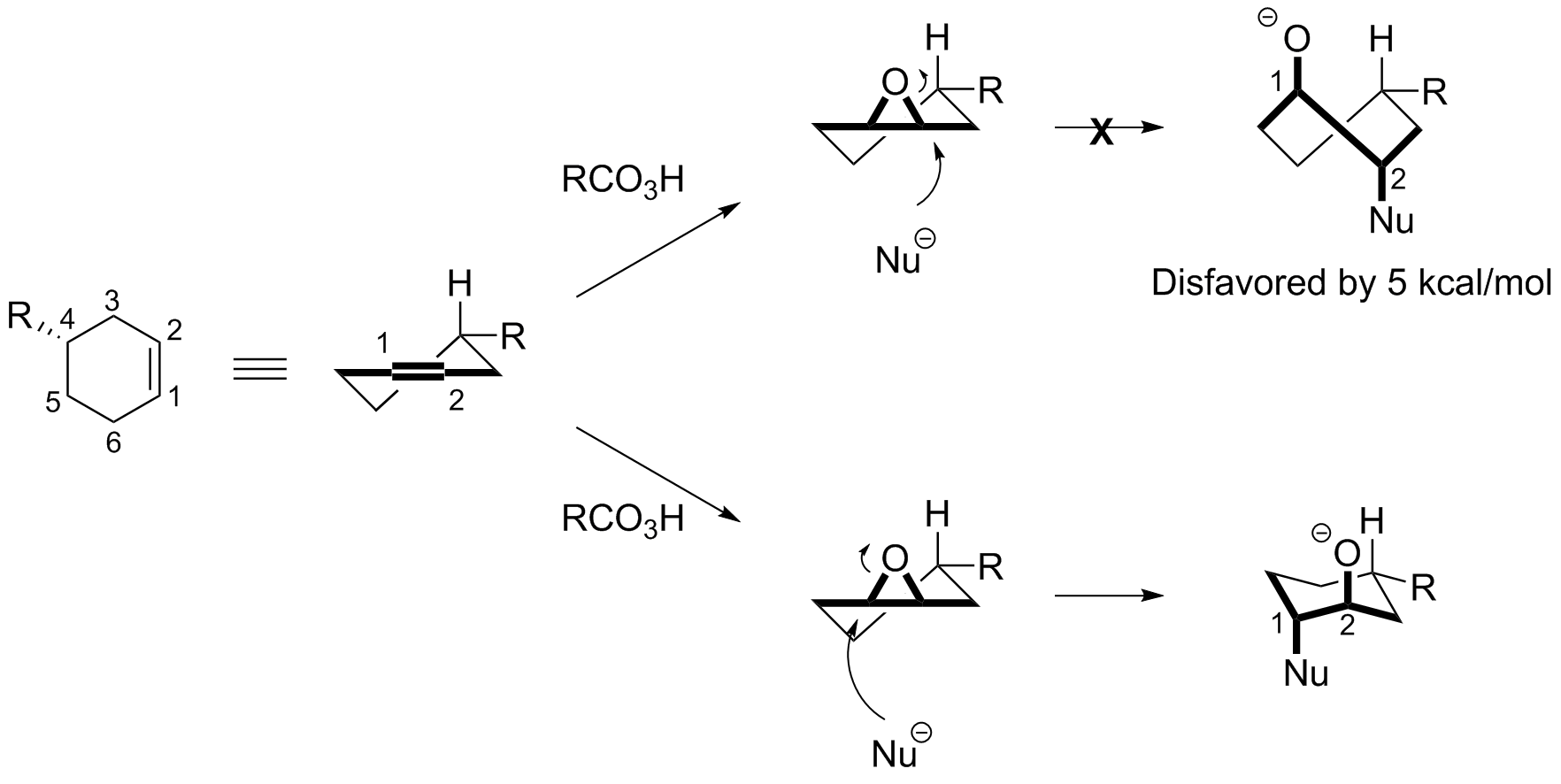

== Examples ==
=== Epoxide addition ===
A recent example of the Fürst–Plattner rule can be seen from Chrisman et al. where limonene is epoxidized to give a 1:1 mixture of diastereomers. Exposure to a nitrogen nucleophile in water at reflux provides only one ring opened product in 75-85% ee.

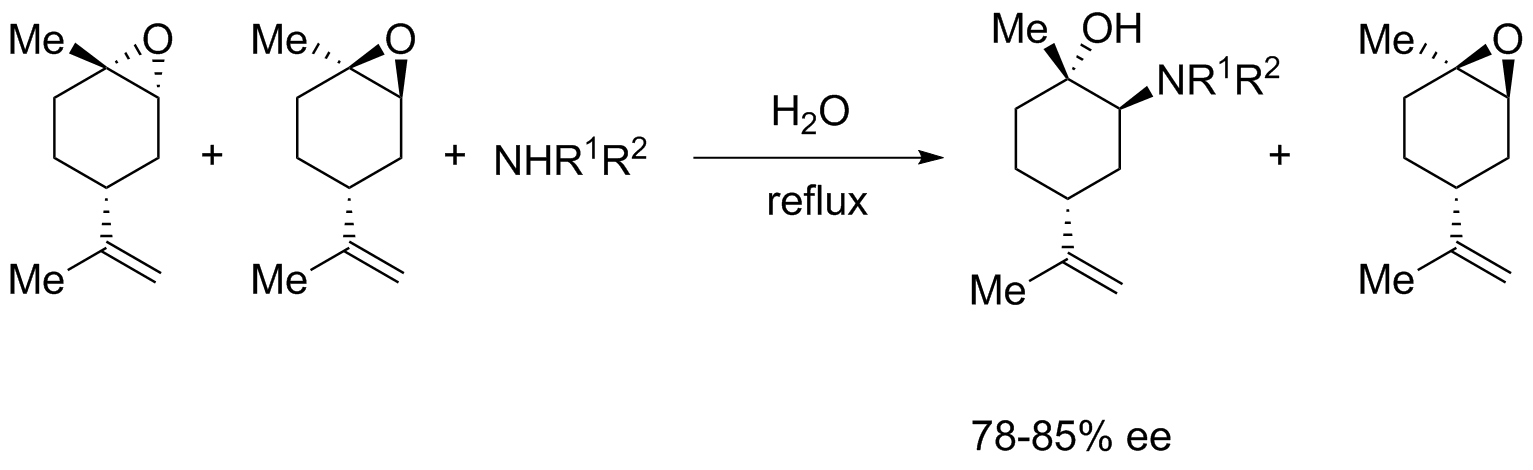

==== Mechanism ====
The half-chair conformation indicates that attack occurs stereoselectively on the diastereomer where the electrophilic carbon can receive the nucleophile and proceed to the favored chair conformation.

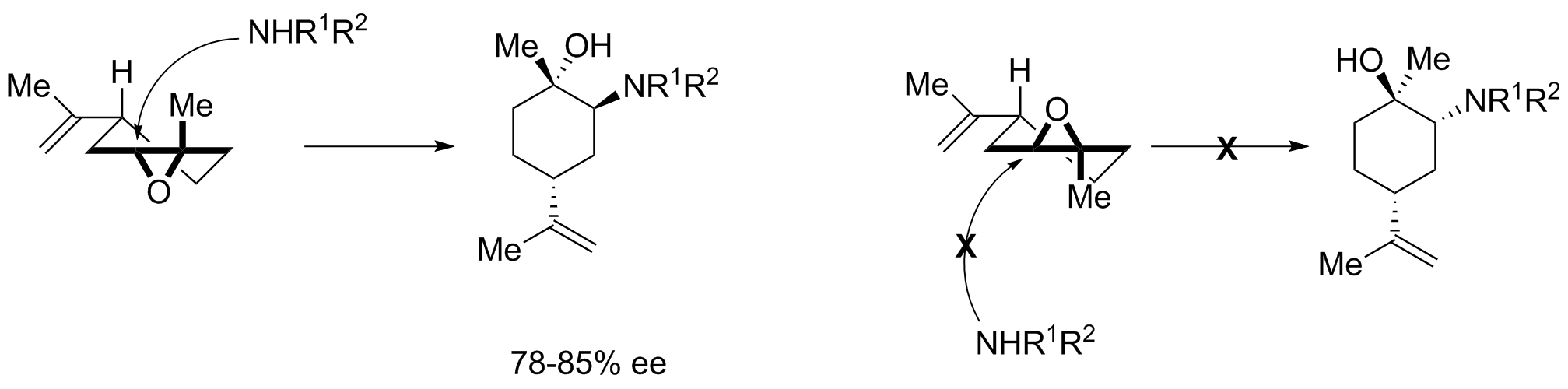

=== Woodward's reserpine synthesis ===
Although not well understood at the time, the Fürst–Plattner rule played a critical role during Robert Burns Woodward's synthesis of reserpine. The problematic stereocenter is highlighted in red, below.

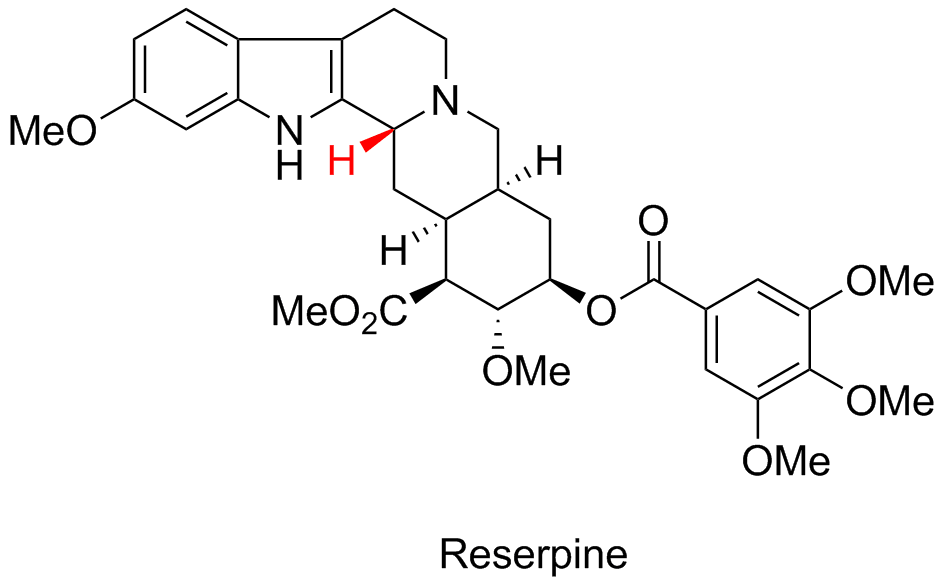

Woodward's synthetic strategy used a Bischler-Napieralski reaction to form the tetrahydrocarbazole portion of reserpine. The subsequent imine intermediate was treated with sodium borohydride, affording the wrong stereoisomer due to the Fürst–Plattner effect.

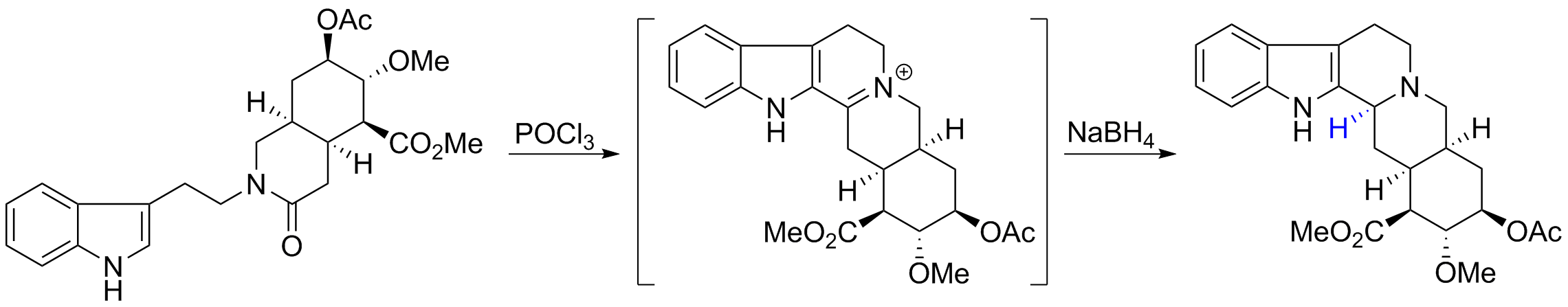

Examining the intermediate structure shows that the hydride preferentially added to the 3-carbon via the top face of the imine to avoid an unfavorable twist-boat intermediate. Unfortunately, this outcome required Woodward to perform several additional steps to complete the total synthesis of reserpine with the proper stereochemistry.

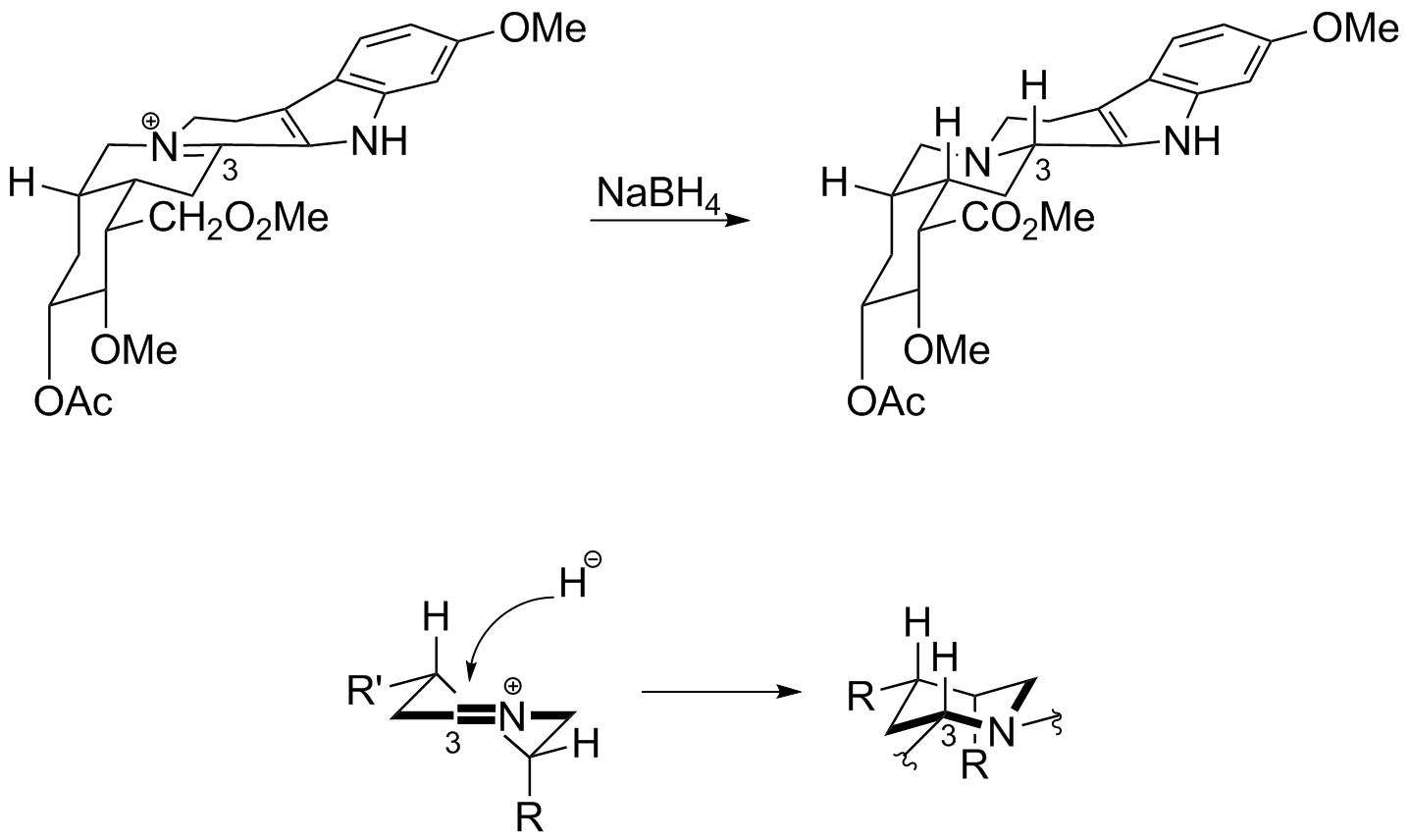
