= List of University at Albany people =

This is a list of notable University of Albany people.

== Notable alumni ==
=== Arts ===
- Phoebe Adams (MFA 1978), painter and sculptor
- Sally Sheinman, painter, installation artist, digital artist

=== Business ===
- Steven Berkowitz (1980), former senior vice president of Microsoft Online Services, and CEO of MOVE
- Lisa Lillien (1987), entrepreneur
- Edward A. Maher (1867), president of the Third Avenue Railway
- Norman E. Snyder (1983), co-founder of SoBe
- Ronn Torossian (1995), CEO of 5W Public Relations, the 13th largest PR agency in the US
- Hamdi Ulukaya, founder and CEO of Chobani
- Tony Vinciquerra (1977), former CEO of Fox Entertainment Group and current CEO and chairman of Sony Pictures Entertainment
- Jang Young-sik (PhD 1970), economist, former president of the Korea Electric Power Company

=== Education ===
- Peter Afflerbach, literacy researcher and professor of education
- Herman Aguinis (1993), George Washington University School of Business professor and 77th president of the Academy of Management
- Julie Ancis, Distinguished Professor of Informatics at the New Jersey Institute of Technology
- Henrietta Ash Bancroft (1843–1929), graduate, Albany State Normal School (1878); professor, Albion College
- Delia E. Wilder Carson (1833–1917), art educator
- Michael R. Gottfredson, former president of the University of Oregon
- Lucy Stedman Lamson (1857–1926), businesswoman, educator
- Harris Pastides, 29th president of the University of South Carolina

=== Government, law, and public policy ===
- Mike Arcuri (1981), former district attorney for Oneida County, New York; former representative for New York's 24th congressional district
- Catherine Bertini (1971), former executive director, United Nations World Food Programme; fellow of the Bill and Melinda Gates Foundation
- Kevin Chambers (BA 1997), associate deputy attorney general in the Biden administration
- Rosa Clemente, 2008 Green Party vice presidential candidate
- Scott de la Vega, acting United States secretary of interior under Joe Biden
- Abdirahman Mohamud Farole (1990), former president of the Puntland region of Somalia
- Lewis A. Fidler (1975), politician and New York City councilman
- Christopher Hahn (BA 1994), Fox News contributor and syndicated radio host
- Lansing Hotaling (1856), district attorney of Albany County; member of the New York State Assembly
- Gerald Jennings, mayor of Albany, New York
- Benjamin Kallos, lawyer and politician
- Jonathan Kanter (1995), lawyer, assistant attorney general for the Antitrust Division of the U.S. Department of Justice (DOJ) from 2021 to 2024, during the administration of President Joe Biden
- Lawrence Korb (PhD 1969), Council on Foreign Relations and Center for American Progress; assistant secretary of defense (1981–85)
- Garreth Lynch, member of the Massachusetts House of Representatives)
- Seth Marnin (BA, MA), judge, New York Court of Claims (2023–present), and first openly transgender male judge in the United States
- John M. McHugh (MPA 1977), congressman from New York's 23rd congressional district (1993–2009); U.S. secretary of the Army (2009–2015)
- Harvey Milk (1951), gay rights figure; former San Francisco city supervisor; assassinated in 1978
- Susan Molinari (BA 1980, MA 1982), former New York congresswoman, Staten Island
- Zina Lisandrou Panagidi (MSc, 1993), former mayor of Lefkoniko
- Joseph E. Persico (1952), best-selling author of Nuremberg: Infamy on Trial; biographer of Edward R. Murrow, Nelson Rockefeller, William Casey; former Nelson Rockefeller speechwriter
- John D. Porcari (1985), deputy U.S. secretary of transportation under the Obama administration; former Maryland secretary of transportation
- Thomas Roach, mayor of White Plains, New York
- Angelo L. Santabarbara (BS, 2001), New York state assemblyman from New York's 111th district (2013–present)
- Martin M. Solomon, lawyer, judge, and politician
- Louis R. Tobacco (1994), New York state assemblyman (62nd District)
- Christine A. Varney (1977), assistant attorney general; United States Department of Justice Antitrust Division
- Mark Weprin (BA 1983), former member of the New York State Assembly and New York City Council
- Richard C. Wesley (1971), judge on the U.S. Court of Appeals, 2nd Circuit
- Lee M. Zeldin (BA 2001), US representative from New York's 1st congressional district (2015–2023); New York state senator from New York's 3rd district (2011–2014)

=== Journalism ===
- Tom Junod (1980), journalist and writer for Esquire magazine since 1997
- Brian Lehrer, host of The Brian Lehrer Show on WNYC
- Gloria Rojas, journalist
- Bob Ryan (1967), former lead weatherman, WRC-TV (Channel 4, NBC affiliate in Washington, D.C.)
- Adrianne Baughns-Wallace, television journalist, WFSB, Channel 3 in Hartford, Connecticut, EssenceTelevision, WPIX-TV in New York City

=== Literature ===
- Nana Kwame Adjei-Brenyah, author of the books Friday Black and Chain-Gang All-Stars
- Emma Lee Benedict (1857–1937), editor, educator, author
- Marcia Brown, children's author
- Lawrence J. Epstein, author
- Stephen Adly Guirgis (1990), playwright (Jesus Hopped the A Train, Our Lady of 121st Street)
- Joyce Hinnefeld, writer of fiction and nonfiction
- Jeffrey Levine, poet, publisher, musician, and attorney
- Lyn Lifshin, poet and teacher
- Gregory Maguire (1976), author of the books Confessions of an Ugly Stepsister and Wicked (which became a Broadway musical)
- Paul Pines, poet, writer, memoirist; founded The Tin Palace, a jazz nightclub on the Bowery in New York City, and the Jazz at the Lake: Lake George Jazz Weekend
- Radclyffe (Dr. Lenora Ruth Barot), writer and editor of lesbian romance, paranormal romance, erotica and mystery; founder and publisher of Bold Stroke Books
- Karen Schwabach (also uses the pen name Sage Blackwood), author of children's books and young adult fiction
- Tricia Springstubb, children's book and middle grade author

=== Performing arts and broadcasting ===
- Priya Anand, Indian film actress and model
- Awkwafina, aka Nora Lum (2011), rapper, television personality, and actress
- Lisa Barlow, businesswoman and television personality (The Real Housewives of Salt Lake City)
- Edward Burns, film actor and director
- Carolee Carmello (1983), Broadway actress and singer
- Randy Cohen (1971), former writer for Late Night with David Letterman; currently writes "The Ethicist" column for the New York Times Magazine and answers ethical questions from listeners of All Things Considered
- Jamie Gold (1991), television producer and 2006 World Series of Poker Main Event Champion
- Harold Gould (1947), actor (The Sting, Rhoda, Golden Girls)
- Rosaline Greene, actress
- Steve Guttenberg, film actor
- Randye Kaye, author, radio talk show host, and voice actress
- Brian Lehrer (1973), radio talk show host
- Monte Lipman, record executive and film producer
- Brandon Jay McLaren (2002), television actor
- Josh Ostrovsky (2006), social media personality, actor, entrepreneur
- Ignacyo Matynia (2013), film and television actor (Break Every Chain)
- Michael Nolin (1970), film studio executive; producer of Mr. Holland's Opus; screenwriter of Maniac Magee; professor at Savannah College of Art and Design
- John Ortiz, film and TV actor (The Job, Carlito's Way, Miami Vice, American Gangster)
- Stacey Prussman (1992), actress, radio host, stand-up comedian, 2021 New York City mayoral candidate
- Howard Reig (1942), radio and television announcer
- Marie Roda, television personality (The Real World, The Challenge)
- Japhe Tejeda, singer-songwriter ("The Boy Is Mine", "Don't Wanna Be a Player"), member of 90s R&B quartet 1 Accord signed to A&M Records
- Frank Whaley, film and television actor
- D.B. Woodside (1991), actor (Buffy the Vampire Slayer, 24, Lucifer, Single Ladies)

=== Science ===
- Frances E. Allen (1954), IBM Fellow, Turing Award winner (2006)
- Sallie W. Chisholm (PhD 1974), biological oceanographer and professor at Massachusetts Institute of Technology
- Alan M. Davis (1970), IEEE Fellow for contributions to software engineering; author; entrepreneur; pomologist; horticulturalist
- Lois Privor-Dumm (1986), director, Alliances and Information for PneumoADIP, Johns Hopkins Bloomberg School of Public Health
- Myriam Gorospe, scientist, head of the RNA Regulation Section at the National Institute on Aging
- Coby Schal (1976), Polish-born American entomologist
- Alanna Schepartz (1982), Milton Harris Professor of Chemistry at Yale University and Director, Yale Chemical Biology Institute; Fellow, American Academy of Arts & Sciences
- Celal Sengor (1982), Turkish geologist, foreign member of the American Philosophical Society
- Omar M. Yaghi (1985), James and Neeltje Tretter Chair Professor of Chemistry and co-director of the Kavli Energy NanoSciences Institute at University of California, Berkeley; recipient of the American Chemical Society Chemistry of Materials Award (2009), 2025 Nobel Prize in Chemistry
- Calvin Zippin (1947), cancer epidemiologist, biostatistician, and professor emeritus in the Department of Epidemiology and Biostatistics at the University of California School of Medicine in San Francisco

=== Social sciences ===
- Robert H. Babcock (BA 1953, MA 1957), historian
- Anne Case (BA), economist
- Philip B. Coulter (PhD 1966), political scientist
- Peter Allen Golden, author, historian, journalist, and blogger
- Debra Hope (PhD 1990), clinical psychologist
- David Pietrusza (BA 1971, MA 1972), historian and author
- William J. Taverner (1990), author, sexologist, editor of the American Journal of Sexuality Education
- Gerhard Weinberg (1948), diplomatic and military historian

=== Sports ===
- Rashad Barksdale (2007), NFL cornerback
- Dave Clawson (MA, 1990), head football coach, Wake Forest
- Dave Cohen (1990), football coach
- Bouna Coundoul (attended 2002-04), Senegalese international soccer goalkeeper
- James Jones (BA 1986, MA 1995), Head Coach of the Yale University Men's Basketball Team
- Jordan Levine, professional lacrosse player
- Ashley Massaro, professional wrestler
- Brett Queener (2007), professional lacrosse player
- Joe Resetarits, professional lacrosse player
- Rob Senderoff (1995), college basketball coach
- Jason Siggers (born 1985), basketball player in the Israel Basketball Premier League
- Lyle Thompson, professional lacrosse player, two-time Tewaaraton Award Winner
- Tara VanDerveer (attended 1971–72), head women's basketball coach at Stanford University; member of Naismith Memorial and Women's Basketball Halls of Fame
- Jarren Williams, NFL defensive back

=== Other ===
- Arlene Istar Lev (1986), family therapist and author of Transgender Emergence: Therapeutic Guidelines for Working with Gender-Variant People and their Families
- Suzanne Lyall, sophomore who disappeared after getting off a bus at Collins Circle in 1998
- Philip Markoff (2007), deceased, accused "Craigslist Killer"
- Raymond F. Shields Jr. (1986), Adjutant General of New York
- Peter Turkson, cardinal of the Roman Catholic Church

== Notable faculty ==
- Frances Dorothy Acomb, historian
- Manuel Alvar (1977–1998), head of the Spanish Royal Academy; known for his linguistic atlases of Spain and Spanish South America
- Branka Arsić, scholar of American literature, won the Modern Language Association's James Russell Lowell Prize in 2016
- Gonzalo Torrente Ballester (1966–70), Spanish novelist (1910–1999); won Cervantes Prize in 1985
- Judith R. Baskin, University of Oregon associate dean for Humanities, director of the Harold Schnitzer Family Program in Judaic Studies, and the Philip H. Knight Professor of Humanities
- Ronald A. Bosco (1975–present), Distinguished University Professor of English & American Literature (2004), SUNY Distinguished Service Professor (1992); president, Association for Documentary Editing; general editor of The Collected Works of Ralph Waldo Emerson, Harvard; has edited, co-edited (primarily with Joel Myerson), and authored over 20 volumes on Emerson, Thoreau, Hawthorne, Michael Wigglesworth, and Cotton Mather
- Don Byrd (1971–present), poet and literary critic; works include his poetry collection Technics of Travel, the book-length poems The Great Dimestore Centennial and Aesop's Garden, an analysis of Charles Olson's Maximus, and his masterpiece of literary analysis The Poetics of Common Knowledge
- JoAnne Carson, painter and sculptor, Guggenheim Fellow (2016)
- Alan S. Chartock, political scientist and radio personality
- Sarah Blacher Cohen, writer, scholar, playwright, and professor
- John Frederick Dewey (1971–1982), British structural geologist widely regarded as an authority on the development and evolution of mountain ranges; Fellow of the Royal Society, Wollaston Medal and Penrose Medal recipient, member of the United States National Academy of Sciences
- Sandra K. Ellston, Shakespearean scholar, former chair of Undergraduate Studies in English and co-director of the Humanities Center
- Joachim Frank (1976–present), German-American computational biologist, School of Public Health; investigator with the Howard Hughes Medical Institute at New York State's Wadsworth Center; elected in 2006 to National Academy of Sciences and named a fellow of the American Academy of Arts & Sciences
- Gordon G. Gallup (1975–present), evolutionary psychologist; developed the mirror test
- M. E. Grenander (1948–89), professor of English, authority on Ambrose Bierce, and benefactor of the M.E. Grenander Department of Special Collections and Archives
- George R. Goldner, art historian, former Drue Heinz Chairman of the Department of Drawings and Paints at the Metropolitan Museum of Art
- Martha Hollander, poet and art historian
- Pierre Joris (1992–present), poet, translator, anthologist; renowned translator of Paul Celan
- Leonard Kastle (1978–89), director of The Honeymoon Killers and notable opera composer of Deseret and The Pariahs
- William Kennedy (1974–present), 1984 winner of Pulitzer Prize for Fiction for novel Ironweed; taught creative writing and journalism as UAlbany instructor from 1974 to 1982, thereafter full professor of creative writing; in 1983, awarded the John D. and Catherine T. MacArthur Foundation Fellowship, part of which went to UAlbany's New York State Writers Institute
- Boris Korenblum, Soviet-Israeli-American mathematician, specializing in mathematical analysis
- Richard Lachmann, sociologist, specialist in comparative historical sociology, and professor
- Scott Lilienfeld, author
- Michael J. Malbin (1990–present), political science, and expert on campaign finance; former speech writer to Richard B. Cheney
- Jon Mandle (1994–present), philosopher who works on issues of political theory and global justice; author of What's Left of Liberalism? An Interpretation and Defense of Justice as Fairness and Global Justice: An Introduction
- Ron McClamrock (1992–present), philosopher who works at the intersection of phenomenology and psychology; author of Existential Cognition: Minds in the World
- Toni Morrison (1985–89), author, Nobel and Pulitzer Prize-winning author (works include Beloved, The Bluest Eye, and Song of Solomon)
- Paul Pimsleur (1970–76), French-American linguist, educator, and researcher of the language acquisition process, and author of Pimsleur Language Series
- Mark Raider, historian and University of Cincinnati professor of modern Jewish history
- Herman Prins Salomon, Dutch-American linguist and historian
- Vincent Schaefer, founder and longtime director of the Atmospheric Science Research Center (ASRC); discovered the first successful method of cloud seeding, with dry ice
- Richard E. Stearns, emeritus (1978–2000), Turing Award winner for computational complexity theory
- Bonnie Steinbock (1977–2014), philosopher, expert on reproductive ethics, and former chair of philosophy department
- Bernard Vonnegut (1967–85), atmospheric scientist known for expertise in the physics of lightning; as a colleague of Vincent Schaefer at General Electric in 1946, discovered silver iodide method of cloud-seeding; older brother of author Kurt Vonnegut
- David Wills (1998–2013), translator of Jacques Derrida

== University presidents ==
The followings persons have led what is now the University at Albany:

No.	Image	Executive	Term start	Term end	Ref.
Principals of New York State Normal School (1844–1867)
1		David Perkins Page	December 13, 1844	January 1, 1848	
2		George R. Perkins	January 1, 1848	July 8, 1852	
3		Samuel B. Woolworth	September 20, 1852	February 1, 1856	
4		David Cochran	February 25, 1856	December 8, 1864	
5		Oliver Avery	December 1864	January 8, 1867	
Acting		Samuel B. Woolworth	February 19, 1867	April 3, 1867	
Presidents of New York State Normal School (1867–1890)
6		Joseph Alden	April 3, 1867	May 23, 1882	
7		Edward P. Waterbury	June 22, 1882	August 8, 1889	
Acting		Albert N. Husted	September 13, 1889	October 29, 1889	
Presidents of New York State Normal College (1890–1914)
8		William J. Milne	October 29, 1889	September 4, 1914	
Presidents of New York State College for Teachers (1914–1959)
Acting		Leonard Blue	September 11, 1914	February 1, 1915	
9		Abram Roy Brubacher	February 1, 1915	August 23, 1939	
10		John M. Sayles	1939–1947		
Acting		Milton Nelson	March 1947	July 1949	
11		Evan R. Collins	July 1949	June 30, 1969	
Presidents of the State University of New York at Albany (1962–1986)
Acting		Allan A. Kuusisto	July 1, 1969	June 30, 1970	
12		Louis T. Benezet	July 1, 1970	June 30, 1975	
13		Emmett B. Fields	July 1, 1975	July 1977	
14		Vincent O'Leary	1977	June 30, 1990	
Presidents of the University at Albany, SUNY (1986–present)
Acting		Judith A. Ramaley	July 1, 1990	July 31, 1990	
15		H. Patrick Swygert	August 1, 1990	June 30, 1995	
Acting		Karen R. Hitchcock	July 1, 1995	November 7, 1996	
16		Karen R. Hitchcock	November 8, 1996	January 31, 2004	
OIC		Carlos E. Santiago	February 1, 2004	February 23, 2004	
Interim		John R. Ryan	February 24, 2004	January 31, 2005	
17		Kermit L. Hall	February 1, 2005	August 13, 2006 (Note: Died in office.)	
OIC		Susan Herbst	August 14, 2006	October 2, 2007	
OIC		George M. Philip	October 3, 2007	November 26, 2007	
Interim		George M. Philip	November 27, 2007	June 16, 2009	
18		George M. Philip	June 16, 2009	December 31, 2012	
19		Robert J. Jones	January 2, 2013	September 23, 2016	
Interim		James R. Stellar	September 24, 2016	September 17, 2017	
20		Havidan Rodriguez	September 18, 2017	present	

Table notes:
