= Dumm =

Dumm is a surname. Notable people with the surname include:

- Andrew Dumm (born 1985), American long-distance runner
- Edwina Dumm (1893–1990), American writer and cartoonist
- Gary Dumm (born 1947), American comics artist
- Lois Privor-Dumm, American researcher
