= Paul Pines =

American poet

- Born: May 23, 1941; Brooklyn, New York, United States
- Died: June 28, 2018 (aged 77); Glens Falls, NY
- Education: Bard College (BA); University at Albany (MSW)
- Occupations: Poet; writer; psychotherapist; jazz festival artistic director
- Spouse: Carol Pines
- Children: Charlotte Pines
- Writing career
- Language: English, Spanish
- Notable awards: Founder Paul Pines' The Tin Palace night club was commemorated with a placard by the Bowery Alliance of Neighbor's Windows on the Bowery exhibition, 2016; honored by the Lost Jazz Shrines series at the Tribeca Performing Arts Center for The Tin Palace; two-time Pushcart Prize nominee; numerous Adirondack Literary Awards
- Website: paulpines.com

Paul Pines was a poet, writer and psychotherapist. Also known for founding and programming Jazz at the Lake: the Lake George Jazz Weekend, Pines started the acclaimed The Tin Palace jazz nightclub on New York's Bowery in the East Village.

== Early life ==
Paul Pines was born in Brooklyn, New York. His father, Dr. Bernard Pines, immigrated from Stanislau, Poland at the age of 12. His mother, Charlotte Rachlin, of Russian Jewish descent, worked her way through law school playing gigs with her all-woman trio. Pines grew up near Ebbet's Field and passed the early 1960s on the Lower East Side of New York.

== Career ==
After graduating from Bard College, he shipped out as a Merchant Seaman, spending August 1965 to February 1966 in Vietnam. An aspiring writer and poet as well as a jazz fan, Pines traveled to San Francisco to meet the Beats, then returned to New York to take up residence in the East Village.

In 1973 he opened the Tin Palace, a jazz club on the corner of 2nd Street and Bowery, which provided the setting for his novel, The Tin Angel (W. Morrow, 1983) and many of his subsequent poetry collections which capture the diverse culture and music scene of the Lower East Side of that time. Pines' travels in Mexico and Central America in the 1980s shaped his second novel, Redemption (Editions du Rocher, 1997), set against the Guatemalan Mayan genocide. His memoir, My Brother's Madness (Curbstone Press, 2007), explores the unfolding of his relationship with his late brother, Claude, and the nature of delusion.

Paul Pines received an MSW from University at Albany, SUNY and taught literature and creative writing at SUNY Adirondack until 2007. Since that time he remains a Jungian oriented psychotherapist.

He founded, programs and hosts Jazz at the Lake: Lake George Jazz Weekend, considered "One of the best-kept secrets on the Eastern jazz festival circuit, the Lake George Jazz Festival is a gem worth discovering."

== Poetry ==
Pines has published thirteen poetry collections including Onion (Mulch, 1971), Hotel Madden Poems (Contact II, 1991), Pines Songs (IKON chapbook), Last Call at the Tin Palace (Marsh Hawk, 2009), Fishing on the Pole Star (Dos Madres Press, 2014), Divine Madness, (The Notre Dame Review]) (Marsh Hawk Press 21012) and Charlotte Songs, (Marsh Hawk, 2015).

== Jazz ==
In 1973, on the Bowery in New York's East Village, "poet Paul Pines opened another crucial jazz club at 310, a haven for loft musicians called the Tin Palace night club," in a former speakeasy at 325 Bowery. Just up the block from Hilly Kristal's C.B.G.B., "jazz made a heady brew," giving much needed exposure to avant-garde jazz artists and poets. Pines booked the acts, presenting jazz from the classics and standards to cutting edge avant-garde, spoken word and Afro-Brazilian artists. Sunday afternoons became known as "prime time for jazz listening." The Tin Palace offered a step up from the small jazz loft scene. "Under the cloak of loft jazz some excellent young musicians and new jazz in general received a great deal of badly needed attention. But the musicians were always quick to point out that they did not play something called loft jazz, they played jazz and, since most night clubs and concert halls then were not receptive to their music, they played in lofts."

Pines has been called the "poet of jazz." The club was an inspiration for Pines' poetry, a novel, The Tin Angel and an opera with composer Daniel Asia. The Tin Palace was commemorated with a placard by the Bowery Alliance of Neighbor's "Windows on the Bowery" exhibition in July 2016, marking 400 years of history on the Bowery.

Jazz at the Lake: Lake George Jazz Weekend, was founded by Pines, the artistic director and host, in 1984. Presented by The Lake George Arts Project, this free festival weekend of contemporary jazz features nationally acclaimed performers in upstate New York every September at Lake George Village's Shepard Park. "Credit Brooklyn-born jazz impresario Paul Pines—curator for all 33 of those festivals—with maintaining a consistently high level of artistry throughout those years. Former proprietor of Tin Palace, the renowned East Village jazz club he ran from 1970 to 1976, Pines is deeply invested in the music and is blessed with good ears and an open mind."

== Prose and essays ==
Based on his night club The Tin Angel (Wm. Morrow, 1983; Berkeley Books, 1995) was published in the US and UK, in France as the L'Ange du Jazz (Editions de Rocher) and in Germany as Der Blechengel (Ullstein Krimi). Redemption was translated by Paul Couturiau & Emmanuel Scavee and published in France (Editions du Rocher, 1997). My Brother's Madness is Pines' memoir of his brother's psychotic breakdown (Curbstone Press, Northwestern University Press, 2007).

His essays have appeared in journals such as The Notre Dame Review, Golden Handcuffs Review, Numero Cinq, American Book Review, and Exquisite Corpse; and anthologized in The Future of (High) Culture in America, (Cambridge Scholars, 2015)], The Body of This Life: Reading William Bronk (Talisman, 2001) and Why We're Here, (Colgate University Press, 2010).

== Other work ==
Editor of Dark Times Full of Light, the Juan Gelman tribute issue of The Cafe Review (summer, 2009), and Dark Times Full of Light, The Selected Poetry of Juan Gelman by Open Letters Press; he has also worked as a translator including contributions to Small Hours of the Night, Selected Poems of Roque Dalton (Curbstone, 1996); Pyramids of Glass, (Corona 95); Nicanor Parra, and Antipoems: New and Selected, (New Directions,1986). His poetry has been set by composer Daniel Asia on five CD's, Songs From The Page of Swords, Pines Songs I & II, Breath In A Ram's Horn and, Purer Than Purest Pure (BBC Singers) on the Summit label. Asia's 5th Symphony, premiered by the Tucson Symphony Orchestra, 2008, and recorded by the Pilsen Symphony Orchestra as Of Songs & Psalms, 2011, features poems by Pines and Israeli poet Yehuda Amichai. Asia also scored Pines' libretto for the Tin Angel Opera.

Pines has conducted workshops for the National Writers Voice program; lectured on writing and culture, and his lectures have been anthologized. He has been a fellow at the MacDowell Colony, Ossabaw Foundation, and Virginia Center, as well as a recipient of an Artists' Fellowship, N.Y.S. Foundation for the Arts, 1984 and a CAPS Fellow, Poetry, 1976.

== Awards and honors ==
The Tin Palace, which Pines founded and operated, was commemorated with a placard by the Bowery Alliance of Neighbor's Windows on the Bowery, in July 2016 to celebrate 400 years of Bowery history to mark its listing on the National Register of Historic Places. The annual Lost Jazz Shrines series at the BMCC Tribeca Performing Arts Center honored the "Tin Palace, bringing yet another legendary NYC venue temporarily back into the consciousness of the jazz world with a thorough remembrance and examination." in 2007.

Pines is a two time Pushcart Prize nominee for Pines Songs in 1993 and Hotel Madden Poems in 1991. He is the recipient of the Adirondack Center for Writing Award for Fishing on the Pole Star, Best Book of Poetry in 2014; New Orleans Variations & Paris Ouroboros, Best Book of Poetry in 2013; Reflections in a Smoking Mirror, Best Book of Poetry in 2012; My Brother's Madness, Best Memoir 2007 and the Best Poetry Book of an Artists' Fellowship, New York State Foundation for the Arts, 1984. Last Call at the Tin Palace was cited by Bob Holman in "Poetry Picks — The Best Books of 2009." He was also honored by the Friends of the Albany Public Library, November 2014
