= Jazz at the Lake: Lake George Jazz Weekend =

The Jazz at the Lake: Lake George Jazz Weekend was started in 1984 in upstate New York by artistic director and host Paul Pines, "poet of jazz" and founder of The Tin Palace jazz nightclub, and program director John Strong. Presented by the Lake George Arts Project, this free festival weekend of contemporary jazz, featuring nationally acclaimed performers in Lake George Village’s Shepard Park, celebrated its 30th year in September 2013. "One of the best-kept secrets on the Eastern jazz festival circuit, the Lake George Jazz Festival is a gem worth discovering;" Downbeat Magazine gave "Credit [to] Brooklyn-born jazz impresario Paul Pines—curator for all 33 of those festivals—with maintaining a consistently high level of artistry throughout those years."

The Festival features old masters and unsung heroes deserving recognition for their energy and invention from Bud Shank to Sun Ra; young artists Don Byron, Cyrille Aimée, Sharel Cassity and Christian Scott; composers Ben Allison and Amina Figorova; soloists Fred Hersch and national treasures Sheila Jordan and James Moody; big bands drawing from the Afro-Cuban lineage, Jane Bunnett and Maqueque, her band of female Cuban All-Stars, Manuel Valera and New Cuban Express; and contemporary visions such as the Dave Liebman Big Band and The Diva Jazz Orchestra; and "out of the box," the Aardvark Jazz Orchestra, The Either/Orchestra and the Ghost Train Symphony Orchestra. High moments include Alto Madness' Richie Cole walking through the audience with a ten-year-old boy on his shoulders as he improvised to Somewhere over the Rainbow and when David Amram led the Glens Falls Symphony Orchestra and T.S. Monk’s ensemble in a version of New York, New York the weekend after 9/11. Over the years through the generosity of private donors the Lake George Jazz Weekend has built an audience that spans generations and travels from throughout the US and Canada to attend.

== The Venue ==
The Shepard Park venue, directly on Lake George, can be seen in the "Jazz at the Lake 30-Year Commemorative Documentary Preview."

== The Performers ==
Jazz at the Lake: Lake George Jazz Weekend of contemporary jazz features nationally acclaimed performers. A partial list includes:

=== 2016 ===
“Celebrating Women in Jazz,” showcased The Brubeck Brothers, singer Charenee Wade, Lao Tizer Quintet with Violinist Karen Briggs, pianist-composer Amina Figarova, 15-piece all-female The Diva Jazz Orchestra led by drummer and co-founder Sherrie Maricle, the Edmar Castañeda Trio, Michael Benedict’s Gary McFarland Legacy Ensemble and the Los Angeles-based funk-fusion trio Tizer, led by keyboardist-composer Lao Tizer;

=== 2014 ===
Anat Cohen, the Israeli born clarinetist and saxophonist and her quartet, French singer Cyrille Aimée with her quintet, Jane Bunnett and Maqueque, her band of female Cuban All-Stars with gypsy jazz and Afro-Cuban music; Raymond Scott Orchestrette, Billy Martin’s Wicked Knee, Steven Bernstein's Sexmob, Manuel Valera & New Cuban Express;

=== 2012 ===
Emilio Solla Quintet, Sachal Vasandani, Warren Wolf Group, Donald Harrison & Congo Square Nation, John Tank & the Tin Palace Reunion Band, Steven Bernstein’s Millennial Territory Orchestra, John "Jellybean" Benitez with Donald Harrison;

=== 2011 ===
Osmany Peredes Quartet, John Ellis and Double-Wide, Grace Kelly Quintet, Don Byron Gospel Quintet, Charles Cornell Quartet, Apex: Rudresh Mahanthappa and Bunky Green, Kyle Eastwood Quintet.

== See also ==
- List of jazz festivals
