= Julius Albert Krug =

American politician (1907–1970)

Julius Krug
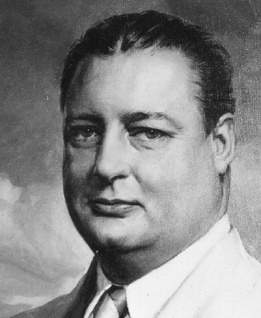

33rd United States Secretary of the Interior
- In office March 18, 1946 – December 1, 1949
- President: Harry S. Truman
- Preceded by: Harold L. Ickes
- Succeeded by: Oscar L. Chapman

Personal details
- Born: November 23, 1907 Madison, Wisconsin, U.S.
- Died: March 26, 1970 (aged 62) Knoxville, Tennessee, U.S.
- Resting place: Arlington National Cemetery
- Party: Democratic
- Spouse: Margaret Dean
- Children: 2
- Education: University of Wisconsin, Madison (BA)

Military service
- Allegiance: United States
- Branch/service: United States Navy

Julius Albert Krug (November 23, 1907 – March 26, 1970) was a politician who served as the United States Secretary of the Interior for the administration of President Harry S. Truman from 1946 until 1949.

== Early life and education ==
Krug was born November 23, 1907, in Madison, Wisconsin, to son of Julius J. Krug (1877–1971) and the former Emma M. Korfmacher (1877–1949). Krug graduated from what is now the University of Wisconsin–Madison in 1929.

== Career ==
His first notable jobs were with the Tennessee Valley Authority, where he started working as chief power engineer in 1938, and then manager of power in 1940. In 1941, Krug was promoted to chief of the power branch of the Office of Production Management. After the beginning of World War II, this office became the War Production Board. Krug was promoted to director of the Office of War Utilities in 1943. In April 1944, Krug enlisted in the United States Navy. He was recalled that August to serve as chairman of the War Production Board, where he served until the board's dissolution in November 1945.

=== Secretary of the Interior ===
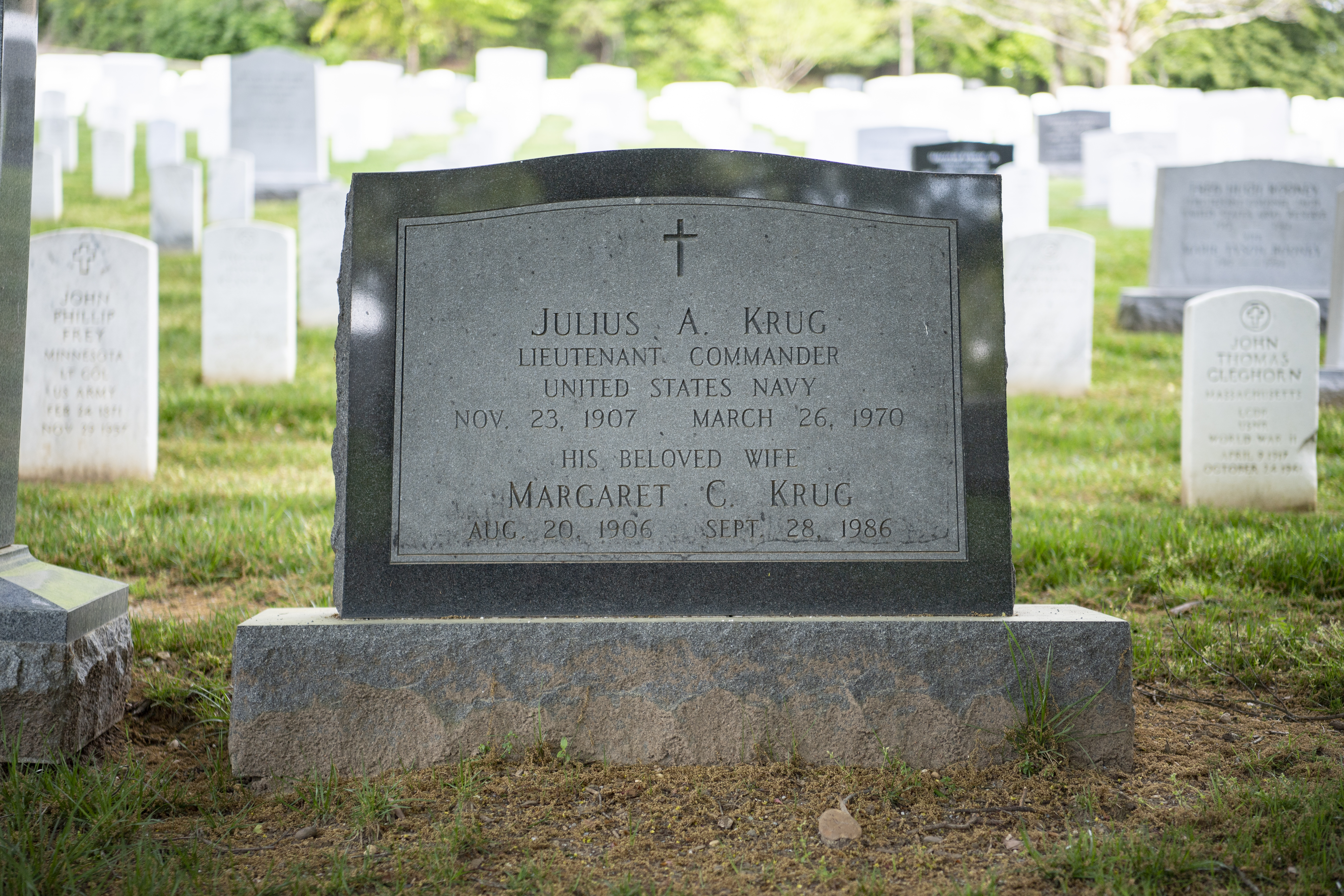
Grave at Arlington National Cemetery

President Truman nominated Krug for the position of Secretary of the Interior on February 26, and he assumed office on March 18, 1946. As Secretary, Krug opposed lumber companies' efforts to gain logging rights to huge forests in Washington state, and opposed the building of unnecessary dams. As the administrator of coal mines in the United States, he led failed negotiations between John L. Lewis and mine owners in an attempt to end a nationwide strike by the United Mine Workers of America.

In 1948, Krug signed a contract whereby the tribe living at the Fort Berthold Indian Reservation in North Dakota was forced to sell 155,000 acres of its land for the Garrison Dam and reservoir project in New Town, North Dakota. The reservoir flooded one-quarter of the reservation, destroying the tribal headquarters, the hospital, and 154,000 acres of fertile farm land. George Gillette, chairman of the Mandan, Hidatsa, and Arikara Nation, commented in 1948:

We will sign this contract with a heavy heart. With a few scratches of the pen, we will sell the best part of our reservation. Right now the future doesn’t look too good to us.

In August 1949, Krug chaired the 19-member United States Citizens Committee that participated in the United Nations Scientific Conference on Conservation and Utilization of Resources, held at Lake Success, New York. Other members of the committee included Herbert Hoover, Thomas Watson, Howard E. Babcock, and Randolph Greene Pack.

== Later career ==
Krug resigned from the cabinet effective on December 1, 1949, and he moved on to the private industry as a utilities consultant in Washington. He also served as the chairman of the board of Brookside Mills, and a cofounded the Volunteer Asphalt Company in the Knoxville, Tennessee.

== Personal life ==
Krug died in Knoxville, Tennessee on March 26, 1970, at the age of 62, and is interred at Arlington National Cemetery in Arlington, Virginia. He and his wife, Margaret Catherine Dean, had two children; a daughter, Marilyn Krug Grether, and a son, James Allen Krug.

== Popular culture ==
Krug's affair with Edith Bouvier Beale of "Grey Gardens" fame is portrayed in the 2009 HBO original film "Grey Gardens," where he is portrayed by Daniel Baldwin.

== Gallery ==
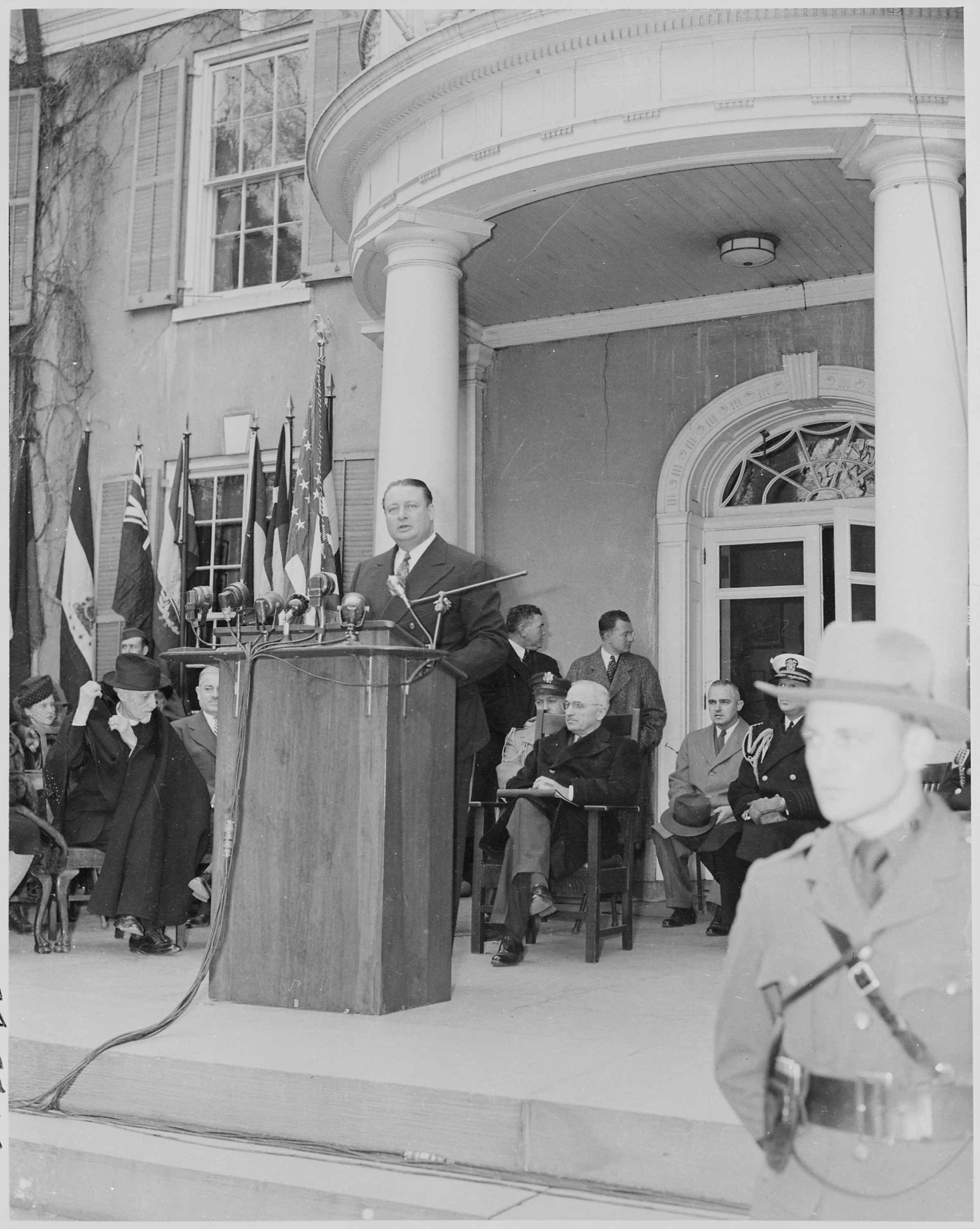
Krug at the dedication of Franklin D. Roosevelt's home as a national shrine, 1946

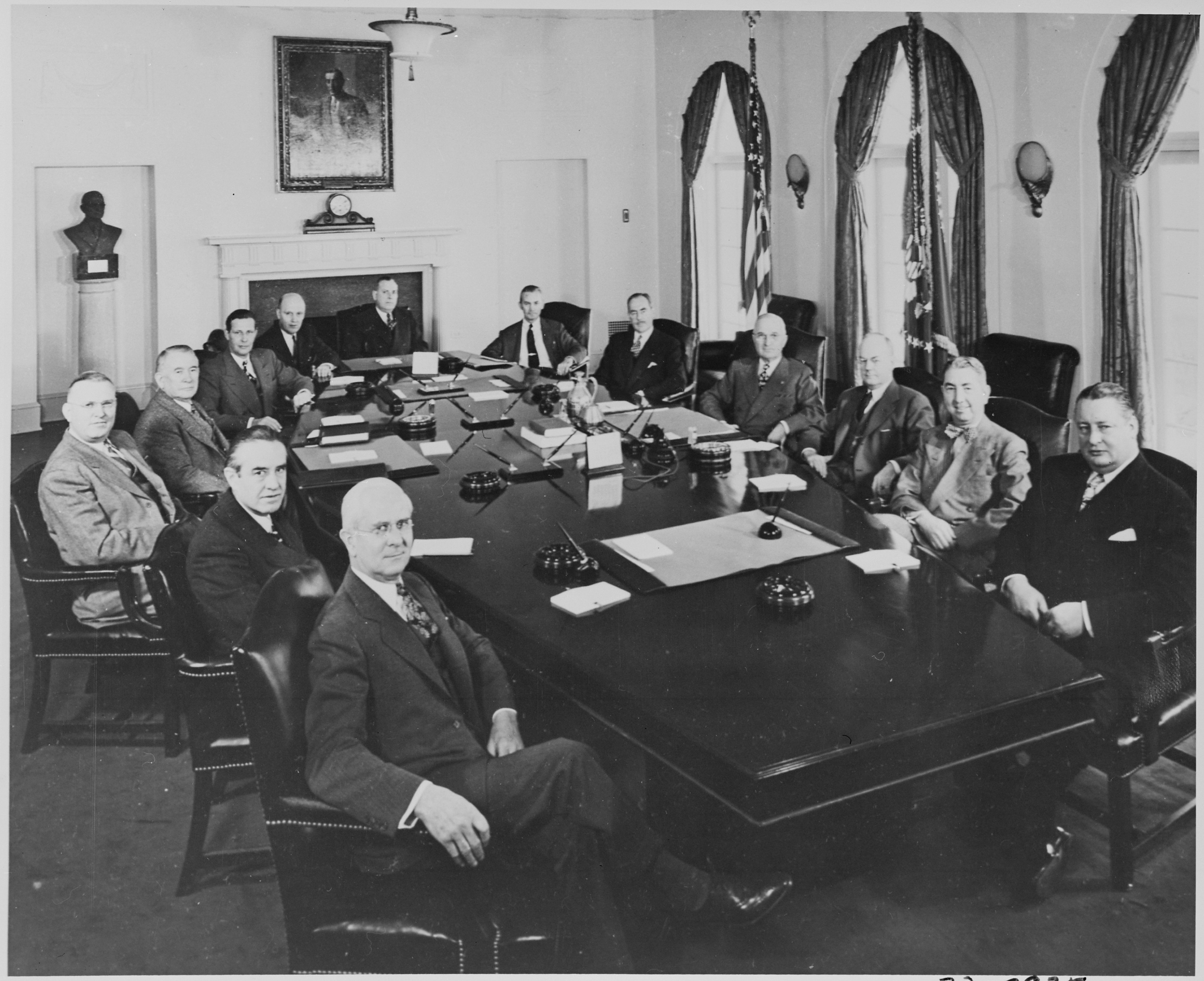
Krug (right) with Truman's cabinet, 1949

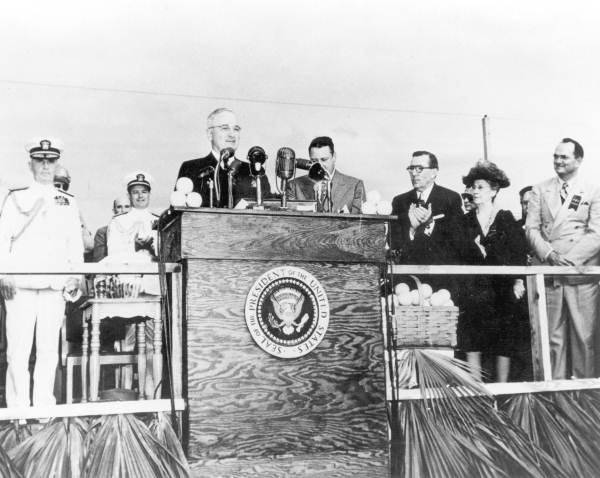
With Truman at the dedication of Everglades National Park, 1947

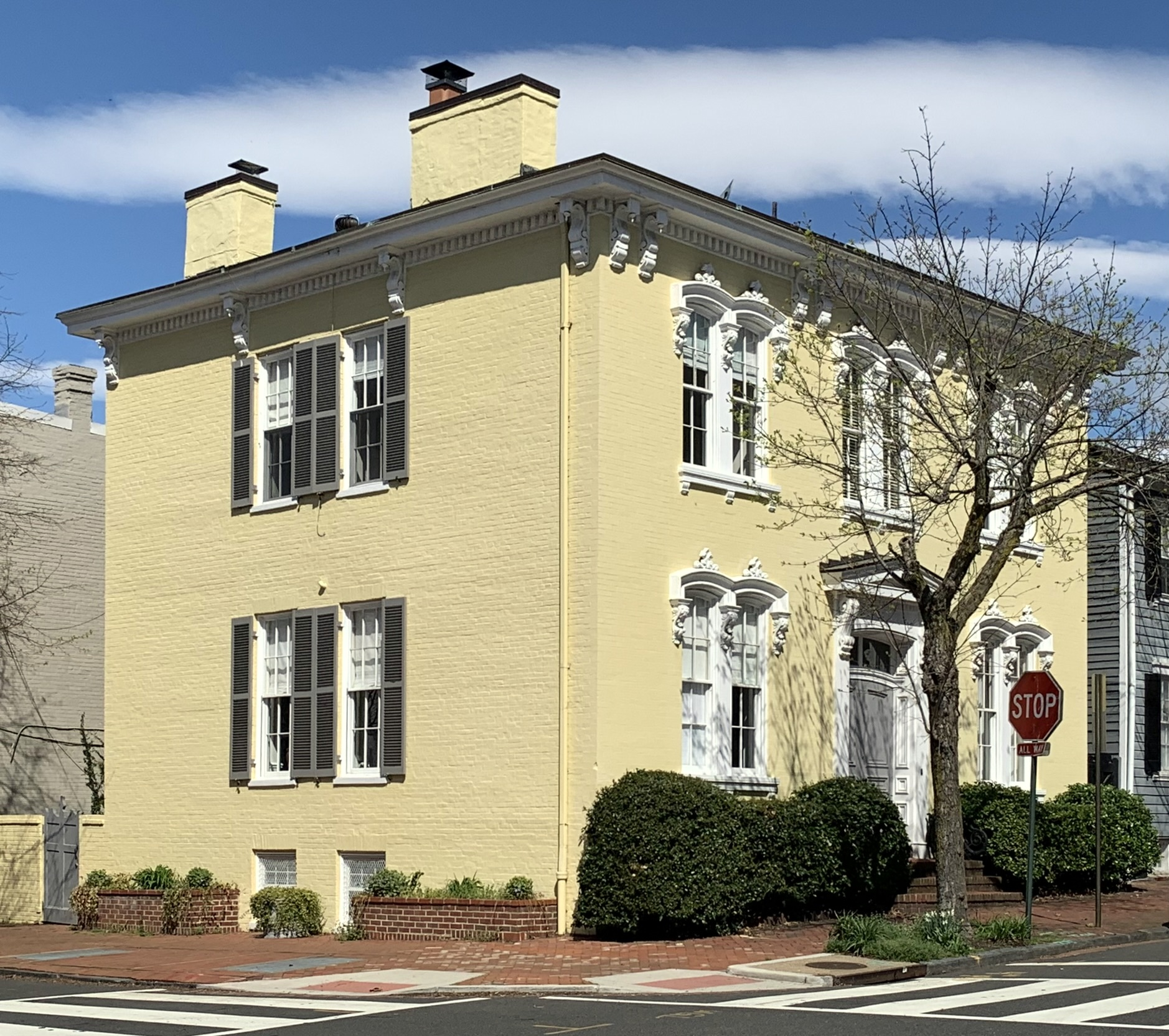
Krug's former house in Washington, D.C.

== Media ==
Krug is portrayed by actor Daniel Baldwin in the HBO original film Grey Gardens (2009).

Political offices
Preceded by Harold L. Ickes	U.S. Secretary of the Interior; Served under: Harry S. Truman; 1946–1949	Succeeded by Oscar L. Chapman
