= Oscar L. Chapman =

American politician (1896–1978)

Oscar Chapman
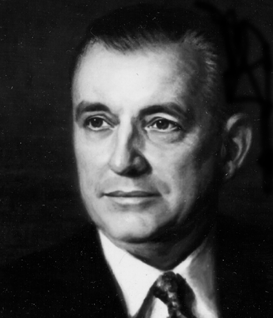

34th United States Secretary of the Interior
- In office December 1, 1949 – January 20, 1953
- President: Harry S. Truman
- Preceded by: Julius Krug
- Succeeded by: Douglas McKay
- Acting; February 15, 1946 – March 18, 1946
- President: Harry S. Truman
- Preceded by: Harold L. Ickes
- Succeeded by: Julius A. Krug

Personal details
- Born: Oscar Littleton Chapman; October 22, 1896 Omega, Virginia, U.S.
- Died: February 8, 1978 (aged 81) Washington, D.C., U.S.
- Resting place: Arlington National Cemetery
- Party: Democratic
- Spouse(s): Olga Edholm; Ann Kendrick
- Children: 1
- Education: University of Denver; University of New Mexico, Albuquerque; Westminster University (LLB)

Military service
- Allegiance: United States
- Branch/service: United States Navy
- Years of service: 1918–1920
- Unit: Navy Medical Corps
- Battles/wars: World War I

Oscar Littleton Chapman (October 22, 1896 – February 8, 1978) was a political activist in the Democratic Party and served as the U.S. Secretary of the Interior, during the Presidency of Harry S. Truman, from 1949 to 1953.

== Early life and career ==
Chapman was born in Omega, Halifax County, Virginia, to James Jackson Chapman, a Virginia farmer, and his wife, Rosa Archer Blunt. He started taking night classes at the University of Denver, spent the 1927–1928 school year at the University of New Mexico, before eventually receiving his LLB from the law school of Westminster University (now a part of the University of Denver) in 1929.

During World War I, Chapman served in the United States Navy Medical Corps, from 1918 to 1920. Chapman was manager of Edward P. Costigan's Senate campaign in 1930, and the Alva B. Adams Senate campaign in 1932. After helping with Franklin Roosevelt's election in 1932, he was appointed Assistant Secretary of the Department of the Interior.

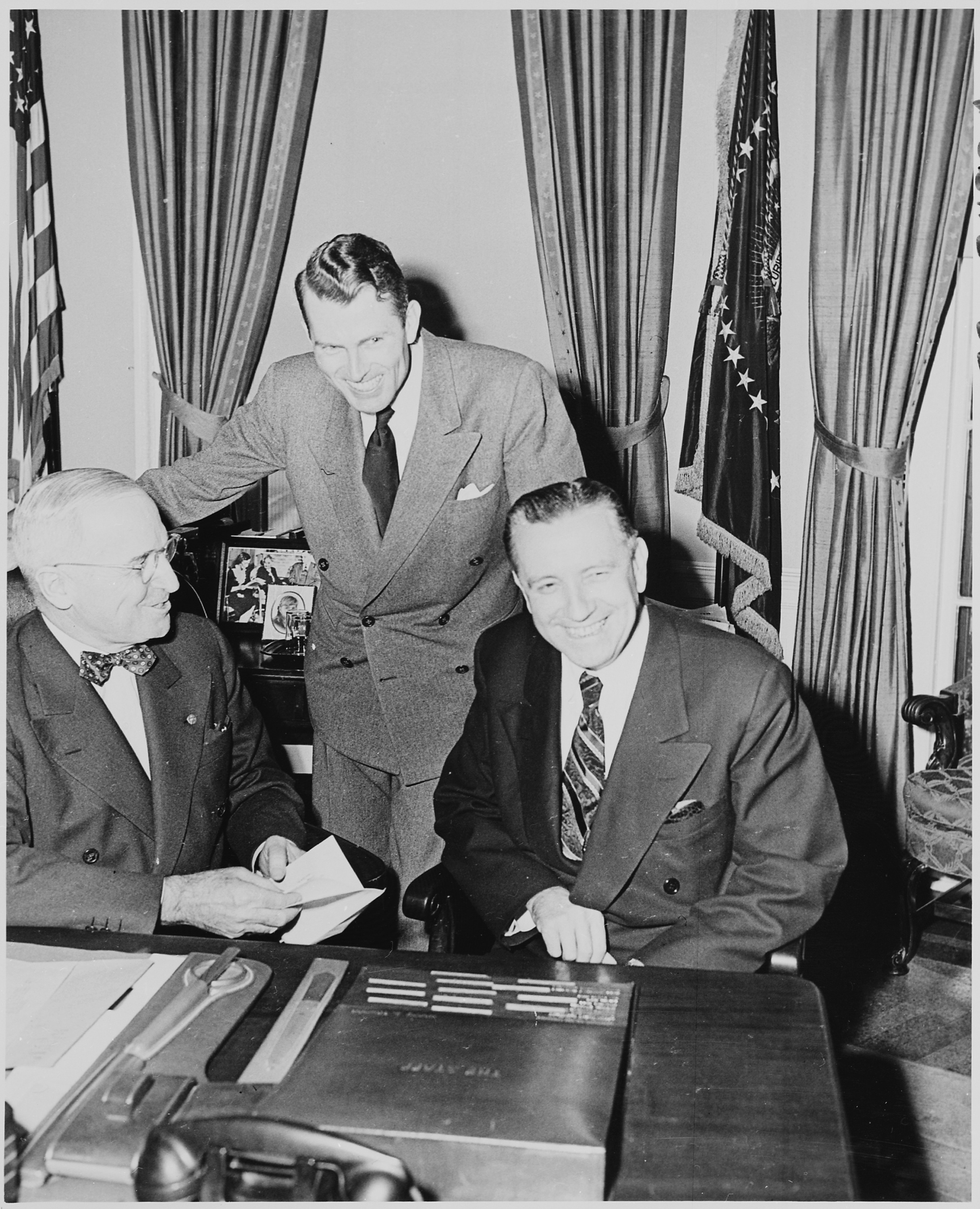
Secretary of the Interior Oscar L. Chapman (right), Under Secretary of the Interior Jebby Davidson (center), and President Harry S. Truman, (December 21, 1950).

In 1939, Chapman was an early victim of the House Committee on Un-American Activities, as then-chairman Martin Dies, Jr. published a list of the government employees who were members of a Communist-controlled organization (Chapman was considered a member because there was a record that he had contributed two dollars to the American League for Peace and Democracy, which was raising money for the loyalists during the Spanish Civil War).

At the 1944 Democratic National Convention, Chapman was impressed by Truman sticking to his early agreement to support the current Vice-President Henry A. Wallace. He was promoted to serve as the Under-Secretary by President Harry S. Truman in 1946. Chapman was one of Truman's advisers supporting the decision to recognize the state of Israel in May 1948 over the objections of the State Department.

Chapman worked to promote Truman in 1948 election, and late in 1949, was promoted to serve as Secretary of the Interior, replacing to Julius A. Krug, who had not supported Truman's campaign.

In 1951, Chapman denied a government loan to the Harvey Aluminum Company, because of a scandal that Harvey had sold artillery shells to the Navy during World War II that were dangerously out of specification.

After end of his service in the Department of the Interior, he practiced law in the firm of Chapman, Duff, and Paul.

== Personal life and family ==
On December 21, 1920, Chapman married Olga Pauline Edholm. She died in 1932. On February 24, 1940, he married the former Ann Kendrick (March 1, 1905 – April 4, 2003). They had one son, James Raleigh Chapman. Chapman died in Washington, D.C., aged 81, and was buried in Arlington National Cemetery in Virginia.

Political offices
Preceded by Julius A. Krug	U.S. Secretary of the Interior; Served under: Harry S. Truman; December 1, 1949 – January 20, 1953	Succeeded by Douglas McKay
