= Kevin Haugrud =

American government official

United States Secretary of the Interior
- Acting
- In office January 20, 2017 – March 1, 2017
- President: Donald Trump
- Preceded by: Sally Jewell
- Succeeded by: Ryan Zinke

Kevin Haugrud served as the acting United States Secretary of the Interior from the end of the Obama administration on January 20, 2017 until the swearing-in of Ryan Zinke on March 1, 2017. Until becoming acting secretary, Haugrud was deputy solicitor of the Department of the Interior.

On December 13, 2016, president-elect Donald Trump picked Ryan Zinke as his nominee for the position of interior secretary.

Political offices
Preceded by Sally Jewell	United States Secretary of the Interior; Acting; 2017	Succeeded by Ryan Zinke
