= United States Secretary of the Interior =

Head of the Department of the Interior

- Seal of the Department of the Interior

- Flag of the secretary

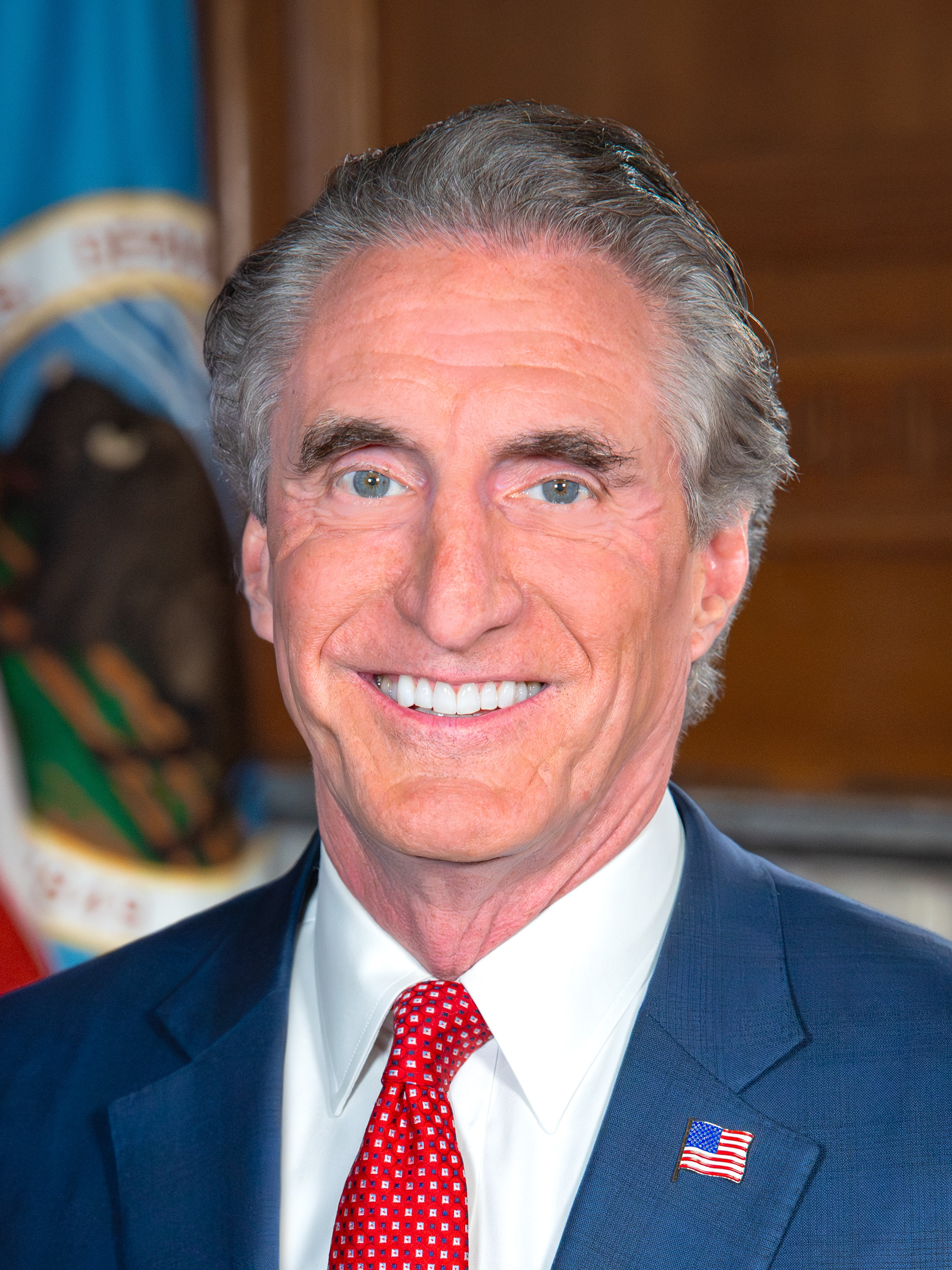
- Incumbent; Doug Burgum since February 1, 2025
- United States Department of the Interior
- Style: Mr. Secretary (informal); The Honorable (formal)
- Member of: Cabinet
- Reports to: President of the United States
- Seat: Stewart Lee Udall Department of the Interior Building, Washington, D.C.
- Appointer: The president; with advice and consent of the Senate
- Term length: No fixed term
- Constituting instrument: 43 U.S.C. § 1451
- Formation: March 3, 1849; 177 years ago
- First holder: Thomas Ewing
- Succession: Eighth
- Deputy: United States Deputy Secretary of the Interior
- Salary: Executive Schedule, Level I
- Website: doi.gov

The United States secretary of the interior is the head of the United States Department of the Interior. The secretary and the Department of the Interior are responsible for the management and conservation of most federal land along with natural resources, leading such agencies as the Bureau of Land Management, the United States Geological Survey, the Bureau of Indian Affairs and the National Park Service. The secretary also serves on and appoints the private citizens on the National Park Foundation Board. The secretary is a member of the United States Cabinet and reports to the president of the United States. The function of the U.S. Department of the Interior is different from that of the interior minister designated in many other countries.

As the policies and activities of the Department of the Interior and many of its agencies have a substantial impact in the Western United States, the secretary of the interior has typically come from a western state; only one secretary since 1949, Rogers Morton, was not a resident or native of a state lying west of the Mississippi River.

Secretary of the Interior is a Level I position in the Executive Schedule, thus earning a salary of US$246,400, as of January 2024.

The current interior secretary is Doug Burgum, who was sworn in on February 1, 2025.

== Line of succession ==
The line of succession for the secretary of the interior is as follows:

1. Deputy Secretary of the Interior
2. Solicitor of the Interior
3. Assistant Secretary for Policy, Management and Budget
4. Assistant Secretary for Land and Minerals Management
5. Assistant Secretary for Water and Science
6. Assistant Secretary for Fish, Wildlife and Parks
7. Assistant Secretary for Indian Affairs
8. Director, Security, Safety, and Law Enforcement, Bureau of Reclamation
9. Central Region Director, US Geological Survey
10. Intermountain Regional Director, National Park Service
11. Region 6 (Mountain-Prairie Region) Director, US Fish and Wildlife Service
12. Colorado State Director, Bureau of Land Management
13. Regional Solicitor, Rocky Mountain Region

== List of secretaries of the interior ==
Parties

Whig (3) Democratic (17) Republican (34)

Status

Denotes acting Secretary of the Interior

No.	Portrait	Name	State of residence	Took office	Left office	President(s)
1		Thomas Ewing	Ohio	March 8, 1849	July 22, 1850	Zachary Taylor (1849–1850)
1		Thomas Ewing	Ohio	March 8, 1849	July 22, 1850	Millard Fillmore (1850–1853)
2		Thomas McKennan	Pennsylvania	August 15, 1850	August 26, 1850	Millard Fillmore (1850–1853)
3		Alexander Stuart	Virginia	September 14, 1850	March 7, 1853	Millard Fillmore (1850–1853)
4		Robert McClelland	Michigan	March 8, 1853	March 9, 1857	Franklin Pierce (1853–1857)
5		Jacob Thompson	Mississippi	March 10, 1857	January 8, 1861	James Buchanan (1857–1861)
6		Caleb Smith	Indiana	March 5, 1861	December 31, 1862	Abraham Lincoln (1861–1865)
7		John Usher	Indiana	January 1, 1863	May 15, 1865	Abraham Lincoln (1861–1865)
7		John Usher	Indiana	January 1, 1863	May 15, 1865	Andrew Johnson (1865–1869)
8		James Harlan	Iowa	May 16, 1865	August 31, 1866	Andrew Johnson (1865–1869)
9		Orville Browning	Illinois	September 1, 1866	March 4, 1869	Andrew Johnson (1865–1869)
10		Jacob Cox	Ohio	March 5, 1869	October 31, 1870	Ulysses S. Grant (1869–1877)
11		Columbus Delano	Ohio	November 1, 1870	September 30, 1875	Ulysses S. Grant (1869–1877)
12		Zachariah Chandler	Michigan	October 19, 1875	March 11, 1877	Ulysses S. Grant (1869–1877)
13		Carl Schurz	Missouri	March 12, 1877	March 7, 1881	Rutherford B. Hayes (1887–1881)
14		Samuel J. Kirkwood	Iowa	March 8, 1881	April 17, 1882	James A. Garfield (1881)
14		Samuel J. Kirkwood	Iowa	March 8, 1881	April 17, 1882	Chester A. Arthur (1881–1885)
15		Henry M. Teller	Colorado	April 18, 1882	March 3, 1885	Chester A. Arthur (1881–1885)
16		Lucius Lamar	Mississippi	March 6, 1885	January 10, 1888	Grover Cleveland (1885–1889)
17		William Vilas	Wisconsin	January 16, 1888	March 6, 1889	Grover Cleveland (1885–1889)
18		John Noble	Missouri	March 7, 1889	March 6, 1893	Benjamin Harrison (1889–1893)
19		Hoke Smith	Georgia	March 6, 1893	September 1, 1896	Grover Cleveland (1893–1897)
20		David R. Francis	Missouri	September 3, 1896	March 5, 1897	Grover Cleveland (1893–1897)
21		Cornelius Bliss	New York	March 6, 1897	February 19, 1899	William McKinley (1897–1901)
22		Ethan Hitchcock	Missouri	February 20, 1899	March 4, 1907	William McKinley (1897–1901)
22		Ethan Hitchcock	Missouri	February 20, 1899	March 4, 1907	Theodore Roosevelt (1901–1909)
23		James Garfield	Ohio	March 5, 1907	March 4, 1909	Theodore Roosevelt (1901–1909)
24		Richard A. Ballinger	Washington	March 6, 1909	March 12, 1911	William Howard Taft (1909–1913)
25		Walter L. Fisher	Illinois	March 13, 1911	March 5, 1913	William Howard Taft (1909–1913)
26		Franklin Lane	California	March 6, 1913	February 29, 1920	Woodrow Wilson (1913–1921)
–		Alexander T. Vogelsang; Acting	California	February 29, 1920	March 13, 1920	Woodrow Wilson (1913–1921)
27		John Payne	Illinois	March 15, 1920	March 4, 1921	Woodrow Wilson (1913–1921)
28		Albert B. Fall	New Mexico	March 5, 1921	March 4, 1923	Warren G. Harding (1921–1923)
29		Hubert Work	Colorado	March 5, 1923	July 24, 1928	Warren G. Harding (1921–1923)
29		Hubert Work	Colorado	March 5, 1923	July 24, 1928	Calvin Coolidge (1923–1929)
30		Roy West	Illinois	July 25, 1928	March 4, 1929	Calvin Coolidge (1923–1929)
31		Ray Lyman Wilbur	California	March 5, 1929	March 4, 1933	Herbert Hoover (1929–1933)
32		Harold L. Ickes	Illinois	March 4, 1933	February 15, 1946	Franklin D. Roosevelt (1933–1945)
32		Harold L. Ickes	Illinois	March 4, 1933	February 15, 1946	Harry S. Truman (1945–1953)
–		Oscar L. Chapman; Acting	Colorado	February 15, 1946	March 18, 1946	Harry S. Truman (1945–1953)
33		Julius Krug	Wisconsin	March 18, 1946	December 1, 1949	Harry S. Truman (1945–1953)
34		Oscar L. Chapman	Colorado	December 1, 1949	January 20, 1953	Harry S. Truman (1945–1953)
35		Douglas McKay	Oregon	January 21, 1953	April 15, 1956	Dwight D. Eisenhower (1953–1961)
–		Clarence Davis; Acting	Nebraska	April 15, 1956	June 8, 1956	Dwight D. Eisenhower (1953–1961)
36		Fred Seaton	Nebraska	June 8, 1956	January 20, 1961	Dwight D. Eisenhower (1953–1961)
37		Stewart Udall	Arizona	January 21, 1961	January 20, 1969	John F. Kennedy (1961–1963)
37		Stewart Udall	Arizona	January 21, 1961	January 20, 1969	Lyndon B. Johnson (1963–1969)
38		Wally Hickel	Alaska	January 24, 1969	November 25, 1970	Richard Nixon (1969–1974)
–		Fred J. Russell; Acting	California	November 25, 1970	January 29, 1971	Richard Nixon (1969–1974)
39		Rogers Morton	Maryland	January 29, 1971	April 30, 1975	Richard Nixon (1969–1974)
39		Rogers Morton	Maryland	January 29, 1971	April 30, 1975	Gerald Ford (1974–1977)
–		Kent Frizzell; Acting	Kansas	April 30, 1975	June 12, 1975	Gerald Ford (1974–1977)
40		Stanley K. Hathaway	Wyoming	June 12, 1975	October 9, 1975	Gerald Ford (1974–1977)
–		Kent Frizzell; Acting	Kansas	October 9, 1975	October 17, 1975	Gerald Ford (1974–1977)
41		Thomas S. Kleppe	North Dakota	October 17, 1975	January 20, 1977	Gerald Ford (1974–1977)
–		Alfred Albert; Acting		January 20, 1977	January 23, 1977	Jimmy Carter (1977–1981)
42		Cecil D. Andrus	Idaho	January 23, 1977	January 20, 1981	Jimmy Carter (1977–1981)
43		James G. Watt	Colorado	January 23, 1981	November 8, 1983	Ronald Reagan (1981–1989)
–		J. J. Simmons; Acting	New Jersey	November 8, 1983	November 18, 1983	Ronald Reagan (1981–1989)
44		William P. Clark	California	November 18, 1983	February 7, 1985	Ronald Reagan (1981–1989)
45		Donald P. Hodel	Oregon	February 8, 1985	January 20, 1989	Ronald Reagan (1981–1989)
–		Earl Gjelde; Acting	Virginia	January 20, 1989	February 3, 1989	George H. W. Bush (1989–1993)
46		Manuel Lujan Jr.	New Mexico	February 3, 1989	January 20, 1993	George H. W. Bush (1989–1993)
47		Bruce Babbitt	Arizona	January 22, 1993	January 19, 2001	Bill Clinton (1993–2001)
–		Thomas Slonaker; Acting	Arizona	January 20, 2001	January 31, 2001	Bill Clinton (1993–2001)
–		Thomas Slonaker; Acting	Arizona	January 20, 2001	January 31, 2001	George W. Bush (2001–2009)
48		Gale Norton	Colorado	January 31, 2001	March 31, 2006	George W. Bush (2001–2009)
–		Lynn Scarlett; Acting	California	April 1, 2006	May 26, 2006	George W. Bush (2001–2009)
49		Dirk Kempthorne	Idaho	May 26, 2006	January 19, 2009	George W. Bush (2001–2009)
–		Lynn Scarlett; Acting	California	January 19, 2009	January 20, 2009	George W. Bush (2001–2009)
–		Lynn Scarlett; Acting	California	January 19, 2009	January 20, 2009	Barack Obama (2009–2017)
50		Ken Salazar	Colorado	January 20, 2009	April 12, 2013	Barack Obama (2009–2017)
51		Sally Jewell	Washington	April 12, 2013	January 20, 2017	Barack Obama (2009–2017)
–		Kevin Haugrud; Acting		January 20, 2017	March 1, 2017	Donald Trump (2017–2021)
52		Ryan Zinke	Montana	March 1, 2017	January 2, 2019	Donald Trump (2017–2021)
53		David Bernhardt	Colorado	January 2, 2019	April 11, 2019	Donald Trump (2017–2021)
53		David Bernhardt	Colorado	April 11, 2019	January 20, 2021	Donald Trump (2017–2021)
–		Scott de la Vega; Acting	New York	January 20, 2021	March 16, 2021	Joe Biden (2021–2025)
54		Deb Haaland	New Mexico	March 16, 2021	January 20, 2025	Joe Biden (2021–2025)
–		Walter Cruickshank; Acting		January 20, 2025	February 1, 2025	Donald Trump (2025–present)
55		Doug Burgum	North Dakota	February 1, 2025	Incumbent	Donald Trump (2025–present)

U.S. order of precedence (ceremonial)
Preceded by Todd Blanche as Attorney General	Order of precedence of the United States as Secretary of the Interior	Succeeded by Brooke Rollins as Secretary of Agriculture
U.S. presidential line of succession
Preceded by Attorney General; Todd Blanche	8th in line	Succeeded by Secretary of Agriculture; Brooke Rollins
