= Jazz (miniseries) =

2001 documentary miniseries directed by Ken Burns

- Genre: Documentary
- Written by: Geoffrey Ward
- Directed by: Ken Burns
- Narrated by: Keith David
- Country of origin: United States
- Original language: English
- No. of episodes: 10

Production
- Producers: Ken Burns, Lynn Novick
- Cinematography: Buddy Squires, Ken Burns
- Editor: Paul Barnes
- Running time: 1,140 minutes
- Budget: US$13 million

Original release
- Network: PBS
- Release: January 8 – January 31, 2001

Jazz is a 2001 television documentary miniseries directed by Ken Burns. It was broadcast on PBS in 2001 and was nominated for an Emmy Award for Outstanding Documentary or Nonfiction Series. Its chronological and thematic episodes provided a history of jazz, emphasizing innovative composers and musicians and American history.

Swing musicians Louis Armstrong and Duke Ellington are the central figures. Several episodes discussed the later contributions of Charlie Parker and Dizzy Gillespie to bebop, and of Miles Davis, Ornette Coleman, and John Coltrane to free and cool jazz. Of this 10-part documentary surveying jazz in the years from 1917 to 2001, all but the last episode are devoted to music pre-1961. The series was produced by Florentine Films in cooperation with the BBC and in association with WETA-TV, Washington.

== Overview ==
The documentary concerned the history of jazz music in the United States, from its origins at the turn of the 20th century to the present day. It was narrated by Keith David and featured interviews with present-day musicians and critics such as trumpeter Wynton Marsalis (also the artistic director and co-producer of Jazz) and critics Gary Giddins and Stanley Crouch. Music critic and African-American historian Gerald Early was a consultant. Broadcaster and producer Phil Schaap was interviewed briefly.

Visually, Jazz was in the same style as Ken Burns' previous works: slowly panning and zooming shots of photographs are mixed with period movie sequences, accompanied by music of, and commentary on, the period being examined. Between these sequences, present-day jazz figures provided anecdotes and explained the defining features of the major musicians' styles. Duke Ellington's "I Let a Song Go Out of My Heart" (1938) was a recurring motif at the opening and closing of individual episodes of the series.

The documentary focused on a number of major musicians: Louis Armstrong and Duke Ellington are the central figures, "providing the narrative thread around which the stories of other major figures turn", among them Sidney Bechet, Count Basie, Benny Goodman, Billie Holiday, Charlie Parker, Miles Davis and John Coltrane.

A number of companion CDs were released simultaneously.

== Episodes ==
Each 87–123 minute episode of the ten episodes of Jazz covered a different era.

No.	Title	Time period	Themes	Original release date
1	"Gumbo"	To 1917	Blues, Louisiana Creole music, minstrel shows, New Orleans jazz, Original Dixieland Jass Band, ragtime	January 8, 2001
Personalities: Sidney Bechet, Buddy Bolden, Freddie Keppard, Jelly Roll Morton, James Reese Europe, Nick LaRocca
2	"The Gift"	1917–1924	Chicago jazz, Harlem Renaissance, New Orleans jazz, World War I	January 9, 2001
Personalities: Louis Armstrong, Duke Ellington, James Reese Europe, Fletcher Henderson, James P. Johnson, King Oliver, Willie Smith, Paul Whiteman
3	"Our Language"	1924–1928	Cotton Club, Harlem Renaissance, Savoy Ballroom	January 10, 2001
Personalities: Louis Armstrong, Sidney Bechet, Bix Beiderbecke, Duke Ellington, Benny Goodman, Earl Hines, Artie Shaw, Bessie Smith, Ethel Waters
4	"The True Welcome"	1929–1935	Great Depression, Lindy hop, swing music	January 15, 2001
Personalities: Louis Armstrong, Duke Ellington, Benny Goodman, John Hammond, Fletcher Henderson, Billy Rose, Art Tatum, Fats Waller, Chick Webb
5	"Swing: Pure Pleasure"	1935–1937	Discrimination in public accommodations, Great Depression, Savoy Ballroom, swing music	January 17, 2001
Personalities: Louis Armstrong, Tommy Dorsey, Duke Ellington, Benny Goodman, Billie Holiday, Jimmie Lunceford, Glenn Miller, Artie Shaw, Chick Webb, Teddy Wilson
6	"Swing: The Velocity of Celebration"	1937–1939	Great Depression, Kansas City jazz, swing music	January 22, 2001
Personalities: Count Basie, Harry Edison, Duke Ellington, Ella Fitzgerald, Benny Goodman, Coleman Hawkins, Billie Holiday, Jo Jones, Chick Webb, Mary Lou Williams, Lester Young
7	"Dedicated to Chaos"	1940–1945	Bebop, racism, swing music, World War II	January 23, 2001
Personalities: Dave Brubeck, Duke Ellington, Dizzy Gillespie, Billie Holiday, Glenn Miller, Charlie Parker, Django Reinhardt, Artie Shaw, Billy Strayhorn, Ben Webster
8	"Risk"	1945–1956	Bebop, drug abuse, West Coast jazz	January 24, 2001
Personalities: Louis Armstrong, Dave Brubeck, Miles Davis, Paul Desmond, Duke Ellington, Ella Fitzgerald, Dizzy Gillespie, Norman Granz, Billie Holiday, John Lewis, Thelonious Monk, Gerry Mulligan, Charlie Parker
9	"The Adventure"	1956–1961	Post-bop, Hard-bop, Modal Jazz	January 29, 2001
Personalities: Louis Armstrong, Art Blakey, Clifford Brown, Ornette Coleman, John Coltrane, Miles Davis, Duke Ellington, Billie Holiday, Sonny Rollins, Sarah Vaughan
10	"A Masterpiece by Midnight"	1961–2001	Bossa nova, civil rights movement, jazz fusion, jazz revival	January 31, 2001
Personalities: Louis Armstrong, John Coltrane, Miles Davis, Duke Ellington, Stan Getz, Dexter Gordon, Wynton Marsalis, Charles Mingus, Max Roach, Archie Shepp, Cecil Taylor

== Reception ==
=== Critical response ===
Reason magazine wrote that Jazz "is filled with rewards, many of them proffered unintentionally. ... Burns's documentary gifts are not visionary, analytical, nor even properly historical. Rather, he is a talented biographer, and his films are most effective when he is able to present an overarching narrative in terms of the biographical detail of that narrative's participants." Jason Van Bergen said, "The nearly 19 hours of documentary coverage contained in the Jazz series unravels like a fine wine", and due to the series' attention to detail, "a complete discussion of every episode in Ken Burns's Jazz would be better suited for a master's thesis" than to his brief review. ... Burns's encyclopedic rendering of the growth of jazz cannot be questioned. Followers of the music will need this set on their shelves; but perhaps slightly more surprisingly, serious students of American history may also require the set to supplement their versions of the past century." In The New York Times, Ben Ratlife wrote that the program's "major thematic device is effective, and would not come naturally to a music-focused jazz historian. It is to show what happens when American whites and blacks encounter each other, not in the abstract but person to person, and make some sort of connection."

Writing in National Review, Deroy Murdock wrote, "the TV documentary sometimes feels like Thanksgiving dinner. It's rich, delightful, filling, altogether satisfying, and, here and there, hypnotic. ... Burns's film is never dull. It's fascinating and captivating." Gene Santoro, writing in The Nation, notes, "If Burns had cut the final episode and billed this as Jazz: The First 50 Years, more of the discussion might be where it belongs—on the movie." William Berlind wrote in The Observer, "In allowing Mr. Marsalis to guide him, Mr. Burns has ultimately done us a disservice. He has managed to make a vital, evolving music seem dead and static." The British newspaper The Guardian wrote, "The series' principal totemic figures, quite rightly, are Louis Armstrong, Duke Ellington, Billie Holiday, Charlie Parker and Miles Davis. Since a large proportion of Jazz is devoted to the swing era, two white bandleaders, Benny Goodman and Artie Shaw, are also given prominence—as, later on, is Dave Brubeck. But even some critics who have spent their lives arguing for a proper recognition of jazz's African-American essence believe that Burns—with the encouragement of Marsalis, Crouch and Murray—has pushed the Afrocentric line so far that the refusal to give credit to the contribution of white musicians undermines the series' historical accuracy." Professor emeritus Frank Tirro wrote, "He gives, as one example, Louis Armstrong's 'West End Blues' as 'a reflection of the country in the moments before the Great Depression.' I cannot see how he can support this statement. What is it reflecting? The African Americans in Harlem, the Wall Street entrepreneurs, or the white middle-class farmers in Kansas and Iowa? This is bull-session history."

== Compilation albums ==
On November 7, 2000, 22 companion single-artist compilation albums, all titled Ken Burns Jazz, were released by the Verve and Columbia/Legacy labels. A five-CD box set, Ken Burns Jazz: The Story of America's Music, was also released, along with a single album sampler of that box set (The Best of Ken Burns Jazz).

=== Released by Verve ===
- Count Basie
- Art Blakey
- John Coltrane
- Ella Fitzgerald
- Dizzy Gillespie
- Coleman Hawkins
- Billie Holiday
- Charlie Parker
- Sonny Rollins
- Sarah Vaughan
- Lester Young

=== Released by Columbia/Legacy ===
- Louis Armstrong
- Sidney Bechet
- Dave Brubeck
- Ornette Coleman
- Miles Davis
- Duke Ellington
- Benny Goodman
- Herbie Hancock
- Fletcher Henderson
- Charles Mingus
- Thelonious Monk
- Various Artists – The Best of Ken Burns Jazz
- Various Artists – Ken Burns Jazz: The Story of America's Music

In 2002, Columbia also released two low-priced box sets, each containing three of the previously released single-artist collections.

- Ken Burns Jazz, Vol. 1 (Includes Louis Armstrong, Duke Ellington, and Benny Goodman compilations)
- Ken Burns Jazz, Vol. 2 (Includes Thelonious Monk, Miles Davis, and Dave Brubeck compilations)
