= Randye Kaye =

American novelist

- Education: University at Albany
- Occupations: Voice actor; author; radio host; actress; singer
- Writing career
- Subjects: mental health, voice acting
- Website: www.randyekaye.com

Randye Kaye is an American voice-over artist, radio host, actress, singer, and author based in Connecticut. From 1990 she has been a radio personality and host - currently on NPR affiliates WSHU-FM/AM, and was on air with STAR 99.9 FM from 1990 to 2005. Kaye has voiced commercials for dozens of major companies, and has narrated a number of children's books for authors such as Gail Gibbons, David A. Adler, Jan Brett, and Sarah Stewart. She also narrated numerous full-length audiobooks for Audible, Tantor Media, and others. Kaye's acclaimed memoir, Ben Behind His Voices: One Family's Journey from the Chaos of Schizophrenia to Hope, was published by Rowman and Littlefield on August 16, 2011. Kaye also narrated the audiobook version, nominated for a 2011 Listen Up Award by Publishers' Weekly in the category "Read by Author". The updated 2nd edition of the audiobook was released in 2022. Kaye currently hosts two podcasts: "The Life Talk Show" and "Schizophrenia: 3 Moms in the Trenches." Her second book, "Happier Made Simple: Choose Your Words. Change Your Life." was published in early 2022.

== Early life ==
Kaye claims she first developed an inclination for performance while attending summer camp as a child, where she preferred theater to sports. She also was influenced by her parents' collection of Broadway Cast albums. She began writing in high school as a columnist, and later began working on song lyrics. She later attended University at Albany where she graduated with a BA. Kaye earned her way through college by singing and playing guitar at coffee houses, both her own original music and covers.

== Career ==
=== Acting ===
After college Kaye returned to theater and improv, performing on tour and in New York City and Los Angeles. At one point she tap danced on-stage with Ann Miller. After becoming a mother, Kaye stayed regionally in Connecticut and New York City. She played Smitty's Mom in the Greatest Movie Ever Made by GMEM Productions, Joan in the Stamford, Connecticut rendition of The Guys, as well as various other theater roles. In May 2011, she starred in a benefit cabaret in Westport, sharing the stage with Sarah Pfisterer and Raissa Katona Bennett of the Broadway production of Phantom of the Opera, and Kristin Huffman of the Broadway show Company. She's also appeared in Guys and Dolls, Cabaret, and Nunsense, which was directed by Danny Goggin. She is a member of SAG-AFTRA, the Actors' Equity Association, Mensa, The Authors' Guild, and Theatre Artists Workshop.

=== Radio ===
Kaye was a Connecticut radio personality at STAR 99.9 FM from 1990 to 2005, and is currently a part-time newscaster and classical music host on NPR affiliates WSHU-FM and WSHU-AM.

=== Voice over ===
While pregnant with her first child, Kaye began her voice-over career as a way to continue acting. She has voiced dozens of commercials and narrations, including for Burger King, Toshiba, Kyocera, Kohl's, Hilton, Priceline.com, Estee Lauder, Dove, Continental Airlines, Big Lots, Curad, Dannon, Verizon, Executone, MISTO, and promos for ESPN and the Newborn Channel. She has also voiced medical scripts, websites, and telephony for clients such as hospitals, pharmaceuticals such as Seroquel and Savella, and patient care such as CVS and Medicare. Her voice can also be heard in video games and in live events such as the Effie Awards, Echo Awards, and Connecticut Press Club. She is a member of WoVO (World Voices Organization, for professional international Voice Talents).

In 2011 she narrated the 40-minute, National Science Foundation founded documentary Ease the Quiet Storm.

=== AudioBooks ===
Since the early 1990s Kaye has narrated dozens of children's books for several well-known authors, including the 1991 children's book Zoo by Gail Gibbons, Walter the Farting Dog by William Kotzwinkle, the 1994 version of David Small's Imogene's Antler, the 1997 audiobook of A Picture Book of Eleanor Roosevelt by David A. Adler, the 2001 book Hedgie's Surprise by award-winner Jan Brett, and 2007's The Library by Sarah Stewart. She has narrated numerous books for the Soundprints Wild Habitats series of children's books, starting in the mid-1990s.

Randye Kaye is also the audiobook narrator of over 170 titles, including her own books, Ben Behind His Voices and Happier Made Simple.

=== Teaching, lecturing ===
Kaye has taught acting, improvisation, and media awareness to children and adults, Kaye also contributes articles and blog posts to the publication Voice-Over Xtra, Technorati, NAMI Advocate, and Holly Pinafore Magazine. She served as the main producer for the VIP interview department at Film Industry Mixer, a group of video production professionals in Connecticut. Her blog at HealthyPlace.com, "Mental Illness in the Family", won several Web Health Awards.

Kaye is also a Connecticut state trainer for NAMI (National Alliance on Mental Illness), and was a diversity trainer/facilitator for the Anti-Defamation League. She has been interviewed by both BlogTalkRadio and Healthy Place.

Edge Studio Kaye was a voice-over coach and teacher for Edge Studio, an audio production studio and voice-over training company based in New York City and Fairfield, Connecticut. Owned by David Goldberg, the company produces for Disney, VW, Microsoft, and National Geographic, and has trained clients from NPR, Associated Press, ESPN, Discovery, Lifetime, and radio stations such as CBS and Bloomberg Radio.

In 2026, Kaye reported on exhibitions at The Aldrich Contemporary Art Museum in Ridgefield, highlighting the institution’s focus on contemporary art and emerging artists.

== Ben Behind His Voices ==
Randye Kaye's first book, Ben Behind His Voices: One Family's Journey from the Chaos of Schizophrenia to Hope, was published by Rowman and Littlefield on August 16, 2011. It is a memoir of her experiences with the onset, development and recovery of her son Ben's schizophrenia. Ben, who developed schizophrenia in his late teens and was hospitalized multiple times, now has proper treatment. Kaye claims her goal with the memoir is to help other families with resources and reduce the stigma of schizophrenia. She frequently speaks to medical providers, legislators, and families on the experiences of mental illnesses.

== Personal life ==
Kaye lives with her husband in Trumbull, Connecticut, and has a son and a daughter. She is a member of Mensa.

== AudioBook narration ==
=== Novels ===
- Isaacs, Susan (2007). Past Perfect. Brilliance Audio. ISBN 978-1-4233-3890-1.

=== Children's books ===
- Gibbons, Gail (1991). Zoo. Live Oak Media. ISBN 978-1-59519-117-5.
- Small, David (1994). Imogene's Antler. Live Oak Media. ISBN 978-0-87499-322-6.
- Schwartz, Amy (1996). Annabelle Swift, Kindergartner. Live Oak Media. ISBN 978-0-87499-357-8.
- Adler, David (1997). A Picture Book of Eleanor Roosevelt. Live Oak Media. ISBN 978-0-87499-399-8.
- Soundprints Wild Habitats Series (1998–2001). Soundprints.
- Brett, Jan (2001). Hedgie's Surprise. Scholastic. ISBN 978-0-439-35277-2.
- Kotzwinkle, William (2004). Walter the Farting Dog. Frog. ISBN 1-58394-053-7.
- Stewart, Sarah (2007). The Money Tree. Live Oak Media. ISBN 978-1-4301-0047-8.

== See also ==
- Voice acting
- Audiobook
