= Scott de la Vega =

American civil servant

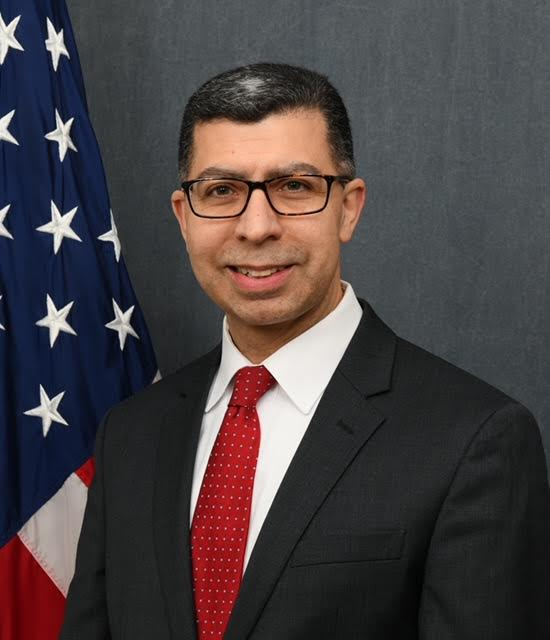

Acting United States Secretary of the Interior
- In office January 20, 2021 – March 16, 2021
- President: Joe Biden
- Preceded by: David Bernhardt
- Succeeded by: Deb Haaland

Personal details
- Education: University at Albany, SUNY (BA); Syracuse University (JD)

Military service
- Allegiance: United States
- Branch/service: United States Army

Scott de la Vega is an American attorney who served as the acting United States secretary of the interior in the Biden administration from January 20, 2021, to March 16, 2021. De la Vega served in an interim capacity until Biden's nominee, Deb Haaland, was confirmed by the United States Senate on March 15, 2021, and sworn in the next day.

== Career ==
De la Vega earned a Bachelor of Arts degree in political science from the University at Albany, SUNY and a Juris Doctor from the Syracuse University College of Law. He was a member of the Judge Advocate General's Corps and worked a litigator for the United States Department of Housing and Urban Development. De la Vega previously served as the director of the Department of the Interior's ethics office.

Political offices
Preceded by David Bernhardt	United States Secretary of the Interior; Acting; 2021	Succeeded by Deb Haaland
