= Sandra K. Ellston =

Sandra K. Ellston (née Klein; born June 18, 1950 in Salem, Oregon) is an American Shakespearean scholar and professor of English and writing at Eastern Oregon University, where she also served as dean of the college of arts and sciences and where she was recipient of the Woman of Vision and Courage Award. Ellston also publishes under the pen names Sandra K. Fischer and Sandra Mason

== Biography ==
She received a Ph.D. from the University of Oregon in 1980. After that, she was a professor at the State University of New York at Albany, where she received both the President's and the Chancellor's Awards for Excellence in Teaching and was chair of undergraduate studies in English and co-director of the Humanities Center. She has conducted research at the Folger Shakespeare Library and received an American Council of Learned Societies grant to participate in the World Shakespeare Conference in Berlin. She specializes in studies of metaphor, particularly metaphors of value and coinage, and is author of Econolingua (1985). Her articles on Renaissance dramatist Elizabeth Cary and on the character Ophelia in Hamlet are widely reprinted. As a research fellow at the Oregon State University Center for the Humanities, she applied metaphors of value and valuation to Shakespeare's history plays. Her scholarly articles appear in various learned journals.

She has spent the last decade as a creative writer of poetry, fiction, creative non-fiction, and drama. Her works appear in various literary magazines, and she was a recipient of the Oregon Literary Arts fellowship award in drama. She is founder and organizer of the Northwest Poets' Concord.

== Bibliography ==
=== Books ===
As Sandra K. Fischer:

- Sandra K. Fischer (1985). Econolingua: A Glossary of Coins and Economic Language in Renaissance Drama. Newark, Delaware: Associated Universities Presses. p. 180.
  - Reviewed in Studies in English Literature. 26: 395–96. 1986.
  - Reviewed in Shakespeare Quarterly 38 (1987): 117-19.
  - Reviewed in The Shakespeare Newsletter 37.1.193 (Spring 1987): 4.
  - Reviewed in Cahiers Elisabethains 30 (1986): 132.
  - Reviewed in Theatre Survey 28 (1987): 75-77.

=== Creative writing ===
- Ambassador, Oregon State Poetry Association, 2007–present.
- Member, Academy of American Poets, 2003.
- “Small Steps” (poem), web published by Poets for Peace, www.iqpoetry.com, March 7, 2003.
- “Surfsound” (poem), hipfish, July 2003.
- “Bear’s Saga, or Revolution” (poem), The Cascade Reader, June 2003.
- “Heritage Tree,” featured poem in Sunday Oregonian, January 14, 2007.
- “Postmodern Erotics” and “Earthwork” (poems) in The Pregnant Moon Review, 2008.
- “Patients First” (creative non-fiction), The Propel Group Anthology, 2008.
- “Primrose” and “The Garden” in Thresholds, November 2008.
- “Fort Clatsop.” “Climbing Mt. Angel,” “Hillwriting: Grande Ronde Valley” (poems), and “Pickin’” (story) in Oregon150 (web), December 2008.
- “A Prayer for Ellen,” 13th Moon, volume 21 (2009).

=== Journal articles ===
- Sandra K. Fischer (February 1990). "Hearing Ophelia: Gender and Tragic Discourse in Hamlet". Renaissance & Reformation: 1–10.
  - Excerpted and reprinted in Michael Meyer (ed.). The Compact Bedford Introduction to Literature (3rd, 6th, 7th, 8th ed.). New York: St. Martin's Press.
  - Excerpted and reprinted in Sandra K. Fischer (2003). Hans P. Guth, Gabriele L. Rico (ed.). "The Feminist Hamlet: Hearing Ophelia, Sandra K. Fischer". Discovering Literature: Stories, Poems, Plays (3rd ed.). Prentice Hall.
  - Excerpted and reprinted in Michael Myer, ed. (2008). "Two Complementary Critical Readings: Joan Montgomery Byles, Ophelia's Desperation; Sandra K. Fischer, Ophelia's Mad Speeches". The Bedford Introduction to Literature, High School Edition (8th ed.).
- Sandra K. Fischer (1989). "'He means to pay': Value and Metaphor in the Lancastrian Tetralogy". Shakespeare Quarterly. 40 (2): 149–64. doi:10.2307/2870816. JSTOR 2870816.
  - Reprinted in Emma Smith, ed. (2003). Shakespeare's Histories. London: Blackwell.
  - Reprinted in Rereading. 3: 141–56. 1991.
- Sandra K. Fischer (Winter–Spring 1986). "Isabel Archer and the Enclosed Chamber: A Phenomenological Reading". Henry James Review. 7 (2–3): 48–58. doi:10.1353/hjr.2010.0294. S2CID 162219898. (Selected for special "Portrait of a Lady" issue.)
- Sandra K. Fischer (1983). "Crashaw, Ste. Teresa, and the Icon of Mystical Ravishment". Journal of Evolutionary Psychology. 4: 176–89.
- Sandra K. Fischer (1983). "Drama in a Mercantilist World". Mid-Hudson Language Studies. 6: 29–39.
- Sandra K. Fischer (Spring 1979). "George Eliot's Daniel Deronda". The Explicator. 37: 21–22. doi:10.1080/00144940.1979.9938572.

=== Essays in collections ===
- Sandra K. Fischer (1999). "Poetry and Pedagogy, or Metaphors we Teach By". Reinventing the Liberal Arts. Buffalo, NY: 1–9.
- Sandra K. Fischer (1991). "Work to do: Humanities Centers in the 'Nineties". Rereading. 3: i–vii.
- Sandra K. Ellston (1994). "Annie Dillard's The Living". American Fiction. Los Angeles: Salem Press: 2360–65.
- Sandra K. Fischer (1994). John L. DiGaetani (ed.). "'Cut my heart in sums': Shakespeare's Economics and Timon of Athens". Money: Lure, Lore, and Literature. London: Greenwood Press: 187–96.
- Sandra K. Fischer (1992). "Garrett Kaoru Hongo". Critical Survey of Poetry. Los Angeles: Salem Press: 1567–74.
- Sandra K. Fischer (1992). "Carolyn Forche's "Burning the Tomato Worms"". Poetry. 2. Los Angeles: Salem Press: 319–21.
- Sandra K. Fischer (1992). "Garrett Hongo's "Morro Rock"". Poetry. 2. Los Angeles: Salem Press: 1418–20.
- Sandra K. Fischer (1992). "Richard Crashaw's "On the Wounds of Our Crucified Lord"". Poetry. 2. Los Angeles: Salem Press: 1596–98.
- Sandra K. Fischer (1985). Margaret Hannay (ed.). "Elizabeth Cary and Tyranny, Domestic and Religious". Silent but for the Word: Tudor Women as Patrons, Translators, and Writers of Religious Works. Kent, Ohio: Kent State University Press: 225–37, 287–89.
  - Excerpted in Jennifer A. Brostrom, ed. (1996). Literature Criticism from 1400 to 1800. 30. Detroit, MI: Gale.

=== Performance ===
- Featured poet at Oregon Writers’ Colony ceremony, Looking Glass Bookstore, Oct. 27, 2008, Portland, OR
- Featured poet at 3d Anniversary Celebration of the Spoken Word sponsored by hipfish, Astoria River Theater, January 13, 2003
- Staged reading of excerpts from my play, The Last Kalapooyan, Pierce Library, EOU, April 16, 2002
- Dramaturge, As You Like It, SUNYA, 1993-94 (commended for excellence by the Kennedy Center/American College Theatre Festival)
- Staged reading of Renaissance by David Bookbinder, Borders, Feb. 13, 1994
- Gertrude and Ophelia in Tom Stoppard's Fifteen-Minute Hamlet, 1990
