= Joyce Hinnefeld =

American novelist

- Born: November 9, 1961 (age 64)
- Education: Hanover College; Northwestern University; University at Albany, SUNY (PhD)
- Occupation: Writer
- Writing career
- Genres: Fiction; non-fiction
- Website: joycehinnefeld.com

Joyce Hinnefeld (born November 9, 1961) is an American writer of fiction and nonfiction.

== Biography ==
Hinnefeld is a professor of English at Moravian College in Bethlehem, Pennsylvania, where she teaches creative writing and contemporary fiction. She has directed the Moravian Writers' Conference in 2014, 2015, 2017, and 2018. Her conferences have attracted notable keynote speakers such as Laurie Halse Anderson, Ursula Hegi, Beth Kephart, Alison Hawthorne Deming, and Marie Myung-Ok Lee. She is a graduate of the PhD program at the State University of New York – Albany. Her fiction tends to address challenging social issues while exploring the inner world of its female characters, particularly their mother-daughter relationships.

Hinnefeld is a 1984 graduate of Hanover College. She earned her master's degree from Northwestern University in 1985. Following graduation, she held editing positions at World Book Encyclopedia, and St. Martin's Press, while also working as a freelance writer. From 1992 to 1994 she was managing editor of 13th Moon: A Feminist Literary Magazine.

Hinnefeld is the author of the novels In Hovering Flight (2008) and Stranger Here Below (2010). Her short fiction has been included in publications such as the Denver Quarterly and the Greensboro Review and anthologies, including Prairie Hearts: Women View the Midwest (1996), edited by Whitney Scott, and Many Lights in Many Windows: Twenty Years of Great Fiction and Poetry from the Writers Community (1997), edited by Laurel Blossom. Her collection of short stories, Tell Me Everything and Other Stories, won the 1997 Bread Loaf Writers' Conference Bakeless Prize for fiction.

Her debut novel, In Hovering Flight, was selected as IndieBound's #1 Indie Next Pick in September 2008. The novel follows Addie Kavanagh, a cancer-stricken birder, environmental activist, and painter, during her final conversations with her daughter and closest friends. The Washington Post's Ron Charles described the novel as a meditation on death, the complexity of human relationships, and the environment that is "quiet as twilight and just as lovely."

Her most recent novel, Stranger Here Below, examines the developing relationship between Maze, a white student, and Mary Elizabeth, a black student, who are roommates at the newly integrated Berea College in Kentucky in 1961. Maze and Mary Elizabeth seek to understand how their experiences and family histories have been shaped by race, class, religion, and sexuality in a work Ariel Balter of the New York Journal of Books described as "graceful . . . a beautiful tapestry of a novel."

Hinnefeld has published essays in The Millions and The Briar Cliff Review.

== Bibliography ==
=== Novels ===
- In Hovering Flight (Unbridled Books 2008)
- Stranger Here Below (Unbridled Books 2010)

=== Short story collections ===
- Tell Me Everything and Other Stories (University Press of New England 1998)

=== Non-fiction ===
- Everything You Need to Know When Someone You Love Has Alzheimer's Disease (Rosen Publishing, New York 1994)

== Awards ==
- Cummington Community for the Arts, Cummington, MA, Fall 1991
- Ragdale Foundation, Lake Forest, IL, Spring 1992
- Eugene K. Garber Prize for Short Fiction (for “Cartographies,” now titled “Tell Me Everything”), 1994
- Katherine Bakeless Nason Prize in Fiction, Bread Loaf/University Press of New England (for Tell Me Everything), 1997
- Pennsylvania Council on the Arts Fellowship in Literature-Fiction, 2003
- Wellspring House, Ashfield, MA, January 2006
- Finalist for the Bellwether Prize for Fiction for "Pilgrim’s Song: A Novel" (now Stranger Here Below), 2006
- Booksense/Indie Next #1 Book (for In Hovering Flight), September 2008
- Christopher Isherwood Foundation Fellowship, 2010
- Virginia Center for the Creative Arts Fellowship, January 2010 and September 2011
- Writing Fellow, Virginia Center for the Creative Arts (VCCA)-France (Le Moulin à Nef), August 2015
