= The Tin Palace =

Jazz nightclub in New York's East Village

Coordinates: 40.725656°N 73.991794°W

The Tin Palace was a jazz nightclub on the Bowery in New York's East Village, founded by architect Misha Saradoff, that opened in 1973 and closed in 1979. Saradoff hired Paul Pines to manage the nightclub which presented jazz from the classics and standards to cutting edge avant-garde and Afro-Brazilian artists.

== History ==
The Tin Palace nightclub opened in the fall of 1973 at Bowery and Second Street in New York's East Village. Its founder, Misha Saradoff, lived in the neighborhood and had managed and tended bar at the off-Broadway theater watering hole Phebe's, on East 4th Street. Pines stated, “I knew I wanted a jazz room with the energy of Sluggs', but not the pathology—the doomed gestalt of hard drugs and raw emotion that had so deeply attached itself to the music since Charlie Parker, the poet maudit of jazz. I believed it was possible to turn that around, that a music which reached for transcendence as often as for a soul could find a more conducive setting. The first six months catered to the Bowery/Soho crowd, which included painters in the lofts, such as Mike Goldberg and Robert Indiana."

Eddie Jefferson, jazz vocalist, lyricist and innovator of vocalese.

The club opened with Murray Shapinski Quartet, Charlie Turyn, saxophonist, Vinnie Giangreco, guitarist. Stanley Crouch (not then the traditionalist he became) proposed "turning Sunday afternoons into prime time for jazz listening." He brought in Air (the trio of Henry Threadgill, Fred Hopkins and Steve McCall), David Murray, James Blood Ulmer, Oliver Lake, and many others.

Poet Patricia Spears Jones recalls 1976: "So The Tin Palace was where the downtown jazz heads and their girlfriends and occasional actual wives could be found afternoons or evenings listening to music and sipping medium quality Chardonnay. When the World Saxophone Quartet composed of David Murray, Julius Hemphill, Hamiet Bluiett and Oliver Lake played The Tin Palace, I took money at the door. And depending on who was playing and or was it town, the mix could include Anthony Braxton, or European instrumentalists and Japanese tourists. That first event, there was a modest crowd that evening. And they got the thrill of a debut—four master reed players making sounds that went on to cover the globe."

The club hosted popular figures such as Kurt Vonnegut and Martin Scorsese. Considered "an unlikely mecca", "an important jazz spot" that "kind of legitimatized the area", the Tin Palace, "a haven for loft musicians", was a venue that "paved the way for today's much larger and (for some, at least) more prosperous live music scene." "New York City owes them a debt that can never be repaid."

Pines went on to use the Tin Palace as inspiration for his writing, including his novel Last Call at the Tin Palace, published by Marsh Hawk Press. He went on to found and program the Jazz at the Lake: Lake George Jazz Weekend in upstate New York.

== Venue ==
Just up the block, "In 1975, at 315 Bowery, Hilly Kristal was opening up C.B.G.B. to the advance guard of New York rock: Television, Ramones, Blondie, and the rest. But just up the street, Brooklyn native Paul Pines had been running a successful jazz club called The Tin Palace for five years, offering much-needed exposure to American artists ranging from bop vocalist Eddie Jefferson to AACM stalwarts Roscoe Mitchell and Kalaparusha Maurice McIntyre."

The club was the preferred hang-out for artists. "New" Jazz was migrating from so-called jazz lofts to clubs featuring avant garde jazz that could not get booked in nightclubs or concert halls. Poet Patricia Spears Jones recalls the Tin Palace as "a haven for the experimental players, directly across 2nd street from CBGB. [Actually half a block north.] This stretch of the Bowery was an odd mix of scene making and desolation. The Men’s Shelter was only a block or two away. I don’t know why I felt safe—maybe it was because the East Village was my part of town; I’d lived or hung out on almost every street between Third Avenue and Avenue D." Located at Bowery and Second Street, the corner location of The Tin Palace was renamed Joey Ramone Place in 2003. Joey Ramone, the lead singer of the Ramones, lived on the block and played at CBGB's, just down the block, "the nexus of Mr. Ramone's downtown world."

Regulars and performers included: Poets: Audre Lorde, Susan Sherman, Miguel Algarin, Kate Millet, Steve Cannon, Eileen Miles, Herschel Silverman, Adrienne Rich, Quincy Troupe, Eve Packer, Donald Lev, Kurt Vonnegut (w/ Jill), Richard Brautigan, Rudy Wurlitzer, Ken Ganjemi, Ken Brown, Shayne Stevens, Bill Zavatsky, Bill Knott, Diane Wakoski, Jerry Rothenberg, Clayton Eschelman, Charlie Mingus, Frank Murphy, Lisa Bond, Gregg Weatherby (Bond, Murphy, Pines, and Weatherby comprised the Tin Palace All-Stars, incorporating poetry and the jazz of Eddie Jefferson and Richie Cole, among others), Jim Nelson, Patti Smith, Jim Carrol, Bill Bronk, Paul Auster, Russ Banks, Don Phelps, Fee Dawson, Hettie Jones, Chuck Wachtel, Joan Silber, Basil King, Martha King, Toby Olson, Harry Lewis, Mark Weiss, Armand Schwerner, Ted Enslin, Paul Metcalf, Irena Klepfisz, George Economou, Rochelle Owens, Michael Heller, Jane Augustine, Richard Elman, Harvey Shapiro, Alan Planz, William O'Rourke, Irving Feldman, Peter Orlovsky, Allen Ginsberg, David Amram, John Weiners, David Antin, Rochelle Ratner, Harris Schiff, Ted Berrigan, Andre Codrescu, Mei-mei Bressenbrugge, Adrienne Rich, Simon Perchik, Patricia Jones, Stanley Crouch, Lionel Mitchell, Robert Hershon, Kathy Acker, David Ignatow, Stanley Kunitz, Seymour Krim, Paul Metcalf, John Wie, Ntozake Shange, Hettie Jones, Joan Silber, Ishmael Reed, Brian Breger, Chuck Wachtel, Joe Johnson, Thulani Davis, Mike Stevens, Steve Vincent, Victor Hernandez Cruz, Frank Lima, Lydia Davis, Donald Phelps, Sonia Sanchez, Meg Reynolds, Diane DiPrima, Richard Price, Hubert Hunky, Paul Pines, Joel Oppenheimer, Joe Johnson, Cubby Selby and Amiri Baraka.

Amiri Baraka, poet formerly known at LeRoi Jones, at the Tin Palace, December 15, 1979. Photo by Carin Dreschaler-Marx.

Painters and photographers: Robert Indiana, Basil King, Joan Mitchell, Lynn Umlauf, Larry Rivers, Jim Nelson, Michael Goldberg, Robert Frank, Ray Ross, and Carin Dreschler-Marx.

Musicians: Dom Salvador, David Murray, Henry Threadgill, James Blood Ulmer, Oliver Lake, Cecil McBee, Jeanne Lee, Jimmy Giuffre, Eddie Jefferson, Richie Cole, Sheila Jordan, Roswell Rudd, Joe Lee Wilson, Leon Thomas, Andy Bey, Paul Jeffrey, Roy Haynes, Bob Mover, Rene McLean, Claudio Roditi, Hilton Ruiz, Charlie Persip, James Newton. Michele Rosewoman, Jackie Byard, Harold Maybern, Cecil Payne, Paul Bley, Kenny Dorham, Howard Johnson, Air, The World Saxophone Quartet, Arthur Blythe, Fred Hopkins, Steve McCall, Ted Curson, Joe Carol, Anthony Davis, Muhal Richard Abrams, Hamiet Bluiett, Philip Wilson, Kalaparusha, Julius Hemphill and Butch Morris.

== Performers ==
Performers, poets, and musicians included: Ted Curson, David Murray, saxophonist; Harry Lewis, a poet and the bartender; the New York Saxophone Quartet, World Saxophone Quartet composed of David Murray, Julius Hemphill, Hamiett Bluiett and Oliver Lake; Anthony Braxton, Stanley Crouch, Paul Jeffrey, the Revolutionary Ensemble, Charles "Bobo" Shaw, Steve McCall, the drummer for the group AIR; Fred Hopkins, Phillip Wilson, Fee Dawson, Lionel Mitchell, Marguerite, Fred Hopkins, Ntozake Shange, Basic Earthforms, and Richard Brautigan, Adrienne Rich, Diane Wakoski, Michael Heller, Jane Augustine and Jack Micheline, and Muhal Richard Abrams, founder of the Association for the Advancement of Creative Musicians.

== Honors ==
The Tin Palace was commemorated with a placard in the Bowery Alliance of Neighbor's"Windows on the Bowery" exhibition at Cooper Union in July 2016, marking the Bowery listing in the National Register of Historic Places. The club was honored by the BMCC Tribeca Performing Arts Center annual Lost Jazz Shrines series, a rediscovery of legendary local venues, as a "lost jazz shrine."

Composer Daniel Asia created the Tin Angel Opera, with a libretto by Pines, based on his novel Last Call at The Tin Angel.

== See also ==
- Paul Pines
- Loft jazz
- Tier 3
- Soundscape
- Five Spot Café
- Slug's Saloon
- Bowery
