= Debra Hope =

Debra A. Hope
- Occupations: Associate vice chancellor and dean of graduate education

Academic background
- Education: Lewis & Clark College University at Albany

Debra A. Hope, Ph.D., specializes in clinical psychology, anxiety disorders, social anxiety, and developmental psychology. She conducts research in two main areas: 1) evaluating and treating anxiety disorders, with a particular emphasis on social anxiety disorders, and 2) examining how stigmas affects the mental health and healthcare experiences of marginalized individuals within the transgender, lesbian, gay, or bisexual communities. Hope is a professor of psychology at University of Nebraska - Lincoln as well as holding the position of associate vice chancellor and dean of graduate education.

Hope has received multiple awards for teaching and work. Her most recent award was the 2016 College of Arts and Sciences Dean’s Award for Excellence in Graduate Education and the Chancellor’s Martin Luther King, Jr. Fulfilling the Dream Award.

== Biography ==
Hope was raised in Eastern Oregon and studied psychology at Lewis & Clark College in Portland as a first-generation student. She attended graduate school at University at Albany, State University of New York where she obtained her Master of Art and Ph.D in clinical psychology.

After receiving her doctoral degree, Hope then worked as an assistant professor at University of Nebraska - Lincoln and did her research center on assessment and treatment of anxiety-related issues. She later expanded her interest into the research of health disparities for LGBTQ people. Hope has published several of books and papers centering on anxiety in social interaction, cognitive-behavioral therapy, college drinking problem with social anxiety, gender anxiety, and the mental health impacts of stigma on gender and sexual minorities.

Hope also holds the position as the director of the Rainbow Clinic, which renders psychological consultation service for LGBTQ speciality. She is currently engaged in continuous research exploring both the results and procedures involved in psychotherapy, and recently focused on work that involves technology to enhance the accessibility of evident-base treatment, particularly in underserved rural areas.

== Research ==
Hope's research program primarily explores the assessment and treatment of anxiety disorders, especially social anxiety in college students as well as mental health of marginalized individuals within the LGBTQ+ community. Her work has advanced understanding and interventions for anxiety disorders, while also illuminating challenges faced by college students with social anxiety and marginalized populations, thereby contributing to improved mental health practices and awareness in society.

== Representative publications ==
- Ham, L. S., & Hope, D. A. (2003). College students and problematic drinking: A review of the literature. Clinical psychology review, 23(5), 719-759. https://doi.org/10.1016/S0272-7358(03)00071-0
- Heimberg, R. G., Mueller, G. P., Holt, C. S., Hope, D. A., & Liebowitz, M. R. (1992). Assessment of anxiety in social interaction and being observed by others: The Social Interaction Anxiety Scale and the Social Phobia Scale. Behavior therapy, 23(1), 53-73. https://doi.org/10.1016/S0005-7894(05)80308-9
- Heimberg, R. G., Dodge, C. S., Hope, D. A., Kennedy, C. R., Zollo, L. J., & Becker, R. E. (1990). Cognitive behavioral group treatment for social phobia: Comparison with a credible placebo control. Cognitive Therapy and Research, 14, 1-23. https://doi.org/10.1007/BF01173521
- Hope, D. A., Heimberg, R. G., & Bruch, M. A. (1995). Dismantling cognitive-behavioral group therapy for social phobia. Behaviour Research and Therapy, 33(6), 637-650. https://doi.org/10.1016/0005-7967(95)00013-N
