= Sharel Cassity =

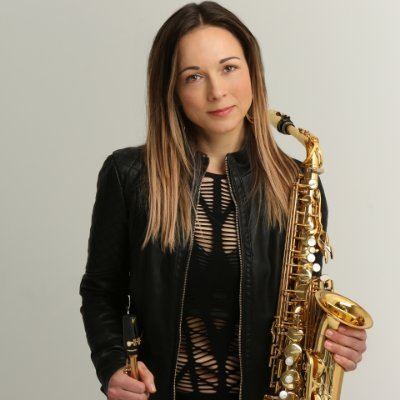

Background information
- Genres: Classical music
- Occupations: Saxophonist; Composer; Educator
- Instrument: Saxophone
- Labels: Relsha Works
- Website: sharelcassity.com

Sharel Cassity is an American saxophonist, composer, and educator based in Chicago, having lived in New York City from 2000 to 2016. She is a winner of the ASCAP Young Jazz Composer, is in the Oklahoma Jazz Hall of Fame, has performed internationally in 27 countries, and is a professor and director of jazz performance at the University of Virginia. In addition to recording several albums, she has toured with her band internationally and has been featured with the Cincinnati Pops Orchestra 2020.

== Education ==
In 2007, Cassity graduated with a master's degree in music from the Juilliard School under full scholarship. She obtained her bachelor's degree from the New School for Jazz and Contemporary Music 2002–2005, having transferred from the University of Central Oklahoma (1996-1999).

== Career ==
Sharel Cassity became a member of the Dizzy Gillespie All-Star Big Band in 2008, performing with legendary artists from including Roy Hargrove, Jimmy Heath, James Moody, Antonio Hart, Lewis Nash, John Lee, and Cyrus Chestnut Cassity continued working amongst NEA Jazz Masters Jimmy Heath in the Jimmy Heath Big Band and Queens Jazz Orchestra from 2012 to 2020, Nicholas Payton's Big Band (2011-2012) the Roy Hargrove Big Band (2008), Cyrus Chestnut (2014) and was lead alto in the DIVA Jazz Orchestra between 2007 and 2013.

Cassity performed as a soloist with the Cincinnati Pops Orchestra in 2020. In 2015, she performed at Jazz at Lincoln Center, Doha, and 2016 in Shanghai, China, with Jazz at Lincoln Center. 2016 performed with Wynton Marsalis and the Lincoln Center Jazz Orchestra at Rose Hall and Botanical Gardens. In 2017 Sharel performed with Herbie Hancock at the Kennedy Center for the Performing Arts to celebrate Jimmy Heath's 90th birthday.

Cassity founded her record label, Relsha Works in 2016. In 2018, she started her educational outreach program, Jazz Up!.

Cassity is on faculty at DePaul University, professor of saxophone at Columbia College Chicago, and professor of piano, flute, and saxophone at Elgin Community College .[7] Cassity played the DC Jazz Festival in 2016 with her electric band, Elektra, featuring Ingrid Jensen & Mark Whitfield. In 2019 she played the Chicago Jazz Festival with her "Fearless" quartet.

Cassity played with Natalie Merchant 2014–2015, appearing on the Today Show (2015 ) and on her album and DVD "Paradise is Here." In 2008, her second album Relentless released on Jazz Legacy Productions, earning 4 stars in DownBeat, and reaching #21 on the JazzWeek, the US Nationwide Jazz Chart. Relentless featured 6 original tracks which include Jeremy Pelt on trumpet, Dwayne Burno on bass, Michael Dease on trombone, Orrin Evans on piano, & E.J. Strickland on drums.

In 2018 she was listed on the SF Jazz website in an article as "10 Rising Women Instrumentalists you should know" and was featured in the Chicago Tribune in 2020.

== Albums ==
- "Just for You" (2008)
- "Relentless" (2009)
- "Manhattan Romance" (2014)
- "Evolve" (2018)
- "Fearless" (2020)
- "Gratitude" (2025)
