= Zina Lisandrou Panagidi =

Cypriot pedagogue and politician

- Ζήνα Λυσάνδρου Παναγίδη

Mayor of Lefkoniko
- In office 2016–2024
- Succeeded by: Pieris Gypsiotis

Personal details
- Born: July 7, 1955 (age 71)
- Spouse: Aristides Panagides
- Children: Andreas Panagides
- Education: Lefkoniko Gymnasium; National and Kapodistrian University of Athens (Dip.JPR); State University of New York at Albany (MSc)

Zina Lisandrou Panagidi (Greek: Ζήνα Λυσάνδρου Παναγίδη; born July 7, 1955), is a Cypriot pedagogue, writer, and politician. She is a former mayor of Lefkoniko, a town that is under the de facto control of Northern Cyprus but is claimed by the Republic of Cyprus. She was elected in the December 2016 local elections, making her one of four female mayors in Cyprus until 2024.

Panagidi graduated from the Philosophical School of the National and Kapodistrian University of Athens in 1977, and in 1993 received a master's degree in Educational Policy and Management from the University at Albany. She also worked in radio and TV.

== Works ==
- Μνήμη Πατρίδας ("Memories of my country"). Nicosia: Lefkoniko Municipality, 1995.
- Τα Βιβλία που Αγάπησα ("The books I loved"). Thessaloniki: Malliaris Paedia, 2012. (ISBN 978-960-457-545-9)
- Του Λευκονοίκου τα πεσόντα τέκνα (1964-1974) ("The Fallen Children of Lefkoniko (1964-1974)"). Nicosia: Lefkoniko Municipality, 2022. (ISBN 978-9925-7652-1-8)
