= Gail Gibbons =

American writer

- Born: Gail Jane Gibbons; November 24, 1944 (age 81); Oak Park, Illinois, United States
- Occupations: Writer, Illustrator
- Years active: 1959-P
- Website: https://www.gailgibbons.com

Gail Gibbons is an American writer and illustrator of children's books, most of which are non-fiction. She started her career as a graphic artist for television, but transitioned to writing and designing children's books in the 1970s.

== Early life ==
Gibbons was born in Oak Park, Illinois in 1944, and she was described as exhibiting "artistic talents at an early age." She gained a reputation in school as an artist, eventually creating her own small books that she personally described as "writing and drawing pictures of what I loved and where I wanted to be." She often visited the Chicago Art Institute nearby which likely fueled her passion for art. She studied graphic design at the University of Illinois. Gibbons herself quoted in the Something about the Author Autobiography Series, "I consider myself quite fortunate because I never had to debate with myself as to what I wanted to do with my life. The answer was always there. I wanted to be a writer and artist." Gibbons was inspired by one of her professors at the University of Illinois who was a professional children's book illustrator.

When she was 21, she married Glenn Gibbons, and started her first job with a television station in Champaign, Illinois. She worked on children's show designing on-air graphics and set design. Later, the couple moved to Chicago, and Gibbons continued her work with the TV station, WMAQ-TV while also picking up jobs in advertising. In 1969, she moved to New York City, worked for WNBC-TV, and ended up designing a few graphics for Saturday Night Live. In 1971, she became the graphic designer for Take a Giant Step, a children's television program on NBC.

== Career ==
Gail Gibbons first book was Willy and His Wheel Wagon, a 32-page self-illustrated picture book published by Prentice-Hall. By 1978, Gibbons had published 5 children's books, including Things to Make and Do for Halloween and Salvador and Mister Sam: A Guide to Parakeet Care. By 1979, Gibbons was pushed to publish solely non-fiction children's books, and she released Clocks and How They Go, which exhibits a more direct teaching style in writing. Gibbons continued with this style of writing, growing into a prolific non-fiction children's book author and illustrator. Some of her books were even chosen as Reading Rainbow selections. Her most recent book was Planes, published in January 2019.

== Awards ==
Source: City Art Director Club award, 1979, for The Missing Maple Syrup Sap Mystery

- American Institute of Graphic Arts award, 1979, for Clocks and How They Go
- National Science Teachers Association/Children's Book Council Award, 1980, for Locks and Keys, and 1982, for Tool Book
- Certificate of appreciation from U.S. Postmaster General, 1982, for The Post Office Book: Mail and How It Moves
- American Library Association Notable Book citation, 1983, for Cars and How They Go, and 1985, for The Milk Makers
- Washington Post/ Children's Book Guild Award, 1987, for contribution to nonfiction children's literature
- National Council of Social Studies Notable Children's Trade Book in the Field of Social Studies, 1983, 1987, 1989, 1990, and 1992
- National Science Teachers Association Outstanding Science Trade Books for Children, 1983, 1987, 1991, 1998
- International Reading Association Children's Choice Award, 1989, 1995; American Bookseller Pick of the Lists, 1992

== Selected works ==
- Willy and His Wheel Wagon (Prentice-Hall, 1975), self-illustrated
- Salvador and Mister Sam: A Guide to Parakeet Care (P-H, 1975), self-illustrated
- Behold ... the Dragons
- Behold ... the Unicorns!
- Farming
- Fire! Fire!
- Giant Pandas
- How a House Is Built
- Knights in Shining Armor
- My Basketball Book
- Penguins
- Pigs
- The Seasons of Arnold's Apple Tree (1984)
- Tell Me, Tree: A Book About Trees for Kids
- The Milk Makers
- The Vegetables We Eat
- The Reasons for Seasons
- Emergency!
- Catch the Wind!: All About Kites
- Sunken Treasure
- Department Store
- Zoo
- Beacons of Light: Lighthouses
- Flying
- Up Goes the Skyscraper
- Country Fair
- Click!: A book about cameras and taking pictures
- How a house is built
- Paper, Paper Everywhere
- Exploring the deep, dark sea
- Deadline!: From News to Newspaper
- My Football Book
- The Post Office Book: Mail and How it Moves
- Fill It Up!
- Weather Forecasting
- Pottery Place
- Playgrounds
- My Basketball Book
- Trains
- The Reasons for Seasons
- Caves and Caverns
- Locks and Keys
- The Milk Makers
- The Honey Makers
- Tunnels
- Yippee-Yay!: A Book About Cowboys and Cowgirls
- Sun Up, Sun Down
- My Soccer Book
