= Julie Ancis =

American psychologist

Julie R. Ancis
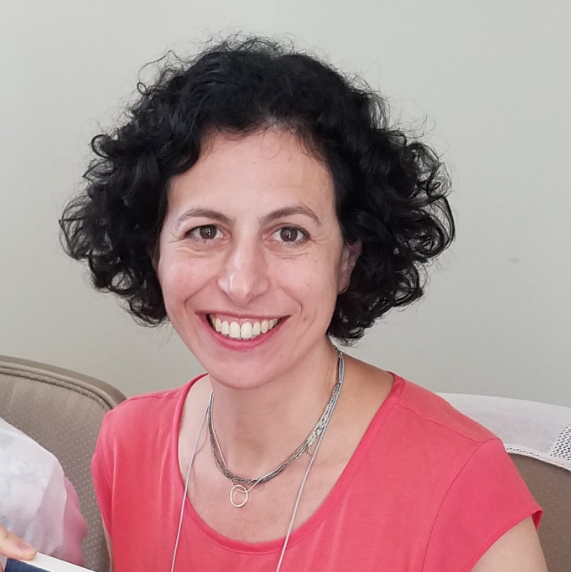
- Born: Brooklyn, New York
- Awards: APA Fellow

Academic background
- Education: The University at Albany, State University of New York

Academic work
- Discipline: Psychology
- Sub-discipline: Cyberpsychology, Social Media, Multicultural Competence, Diversity
- Institutions: New Jersey Institute of Technology

Julie Ancis currently is a Distinguished Professor of Informatics at the New Jersey Institute of Technology. She served as the interim chair of the Department of Informatics and was also a Professor of Psychology and the inaugural Director of Cyberpsychology at the New Jersey Institute of Technology. She was previously a professor at Georgia State University for 15 years and Associate Vice President of Diversity at Georgia Institute of Technology. Ancis is an expert in the areas of cyberpsychology, multicultural competence and diversity. She has authored 4 books and over 80 scholarly publications.

Ancis holds Fellow Status in the American Psychological Association (APA) in Division 17, Division 35, and Division 46. She has presented both nationally and internationally at leading conferences such as the American Psychological Association Conference, the International Congress of Applied Psychology, the International Conference of Psychology, the American Psychological Society, and TTI/Vanguard. Ancis has served on professional committees and has held leadership positions within the American Psychological Association, the Georgia Psychological Association, and the American Counseling Association.

== Education ==
Ancis completed her B.A. in psychology, M.S.in Counseling, and Ph.D. in Counseling Psychology from the University at Albany, State University of New York. She completed her doctoral internship at the University of Maryland in 1994.

== Career ==
Ancis began her academic career at Old Dominion University where she served as an assistant professor from 1994 to 1997. She then moved to Georgia State University where she was a tenured faculty member from 1994 to 2012 and earned Full Professor in 2008. In 2012, she joined the Georgia Institute of Technology as their inaugural vice president of Institute Diversity, Equity, and Inclusion where she initiated several programs that developed staff, faculty, and campus leadership on issues of equity and inclusion, such as implicit bias workshops. She also developed and co-facilitated a women's leadership program at the Georgia Institute of Technology. In October 2019, Ancis joined the New Jersey Institute of Technology as professor of psychology and the inaugural Director of Cyberpsychology. She was promoted to the rank of Distinguished Professor in 2022.

Ancis has authored four books. She is known for her seminal work in cyberpsychology, white privilege, diversity, and the educational and legal experiences of women and girls. She has also written several publications examining the intersection of diversity and technology, including a cyberpsychology blog for Psychology Today. Ancis’ article "The age of cyberpsychology: An overview" was published in the first issue of the American Psychological Association journal, Technology, Mind and Behavior. Ancis is a Fellow of the American Psychological Association (Divisions 17, 35, and 46) and Past-Chair of the Society of Counseling Psychology's Section for the Advancement of Women. She is the Principal or Co-Principal Investigator of over 6 million dollars in grant funding from the Department of Education and the National Science Foundation.

== Activism ==
In 2021, Ancis founded Psychologists Against Antisemitism, an 800-member group of clinicians, educators, and psychology students. Ancis said she founded the group to counter the antisemitism she and her Jewish colleagues have experienced in some divisions of the American Psychological Association.

== Awards and honors ==
- 2021 Fellow, Society for Media Psychology and Technology, Division 46, American Psychological Association.
- 2015 Fellow, Psychology of Women, Division 35, American Psychological Association.
- 2011 Fellow, Society of Counseling Psychology, Division 17, American Psychological Association.
- 2010 Woman of the Year Award, American Psychological Association, Society of Counseling Psychology, Division 17, Section for the Advancement of Women.
- 2009-2009 Cambridge Who's Who, Listing.
- 2005 Outstanding Faculty Research Award, College of Education, Georgia State University.

== Books ==
- "Gender, Psychology, and Justice | The Mental Health of Women and Girls in the Legal System | Books - NYU Press | NYU Press". nyupress.org.
- Ancis, Julie R; Jongsma, Arthur E. (2007). The complete women's psychotherapy treatment planner. Hoboken, N.J. : John Wiley & Sons. ISBN 978-0470039830.
- Ancis, Julie R. (2004). Culturally Responsive Interventions: Innovative Approaches to Working with Diverse Populations. Psychology Press. ISBN 9780415933339.
- Nina, Schwitzer, Alan M.|Ancis, Julie R.|Brown (2000-11-30). Promoting Student Learning and Student Development at a Distance: Student Affairs Concepts and Practices for Televised Instruction and Other Forms of Distance Learning. University Press of America, Inc. ISBN 9781883485221.
