= Daniel Asia =

American composer

Daniel Asia (born June 27, 1953) is an American composer. He was born in Seattle, Washington, in the United States of America.

== Biography ==
He received a B.A. degree from Hampshire College and a M.M. from the Yale School of Music. His major teachers include Jacob Druckman, Stephen Albert, Gunther Schuller, and Isang Yun in composition, and Arthur Weisberg in conducting. Asia's works ranges from solo pieces to large-scale multi-movement works for orchestra, including five symphonies.

He served on the faculty of the Oberlin Conservatory of Music as Assistant Professor of Contemporary Music and Wind Ensemble from 1981 to 1986. In 1986–88, a UK Fulbright Arts Fellowship and a Guggenheim Fellowship enabled him to work in London as a visiting lecturer at City University. Since 1988, he has been Professor of Composition and head of the composition department at the University of Arizona in Tucson. He conducts the New York-based contemporary chamber ensemble The Musical Elements, which he co-founded in 1977. Asia founded and directs the American Culture and Ideas Initiative.

As a blogger, Asia contributes articles on music and culture to The Huffington Post. In 2013, he gained notoriety after receiving international responses for an April 25 article entitled "Carter is Dead."

== Awards ==
From 1991-1994, Asia was the Meet the Composer/Composer In Residence with the Phoenix Symphony. He has been the recipient of a Meet The Composer/Reader's Digest Consortium Commission, United Kingdom Fulbright Arts Award Fellowship, a Guggenheim Fellowship, four NEA Composers Grants, a M. B. Rockefeller Grant, an Aaron Copland Fund for Music Grant, MacDowell Colony and Tanglewood Fellowships, ASCAP and BMI composition prizes, and a DAAD Fellowship for study in the Federal Republic of Germany. Asia is the 2010 recipient of the American Academy of Arts and Letters award (2010).

== Works ==
- 1973 – Sound Shapes, for SSAATTBB chorus and pitch pipes
- 1974–75 – On the Surface, for soprano, piano, harp, cello, and percussion
- 1975 – Dream Sequence I, for amplified trombone
- 1975 – Piano Set I for solo piano
- 1976 – Piano Set II (or Popsicle Upside Down on the Pavement) for two pianos
- 1976 – String Quartet No. 1
- 1976 – Miles Mix, for tape
- 1978 – Why (?) Jacob for chorus and piano
- 1979 – Orange, for viola
- 1980–81 – Rivalries, for chamber orchestra
- 1983 – Why (?) Jacob for solo piano
- 1984 – Three Movements, for trumpet and orchestra
- 1985 – String Quartet No. 2
- 1987 – Scherzo Sonata for solo piano
- 1987 – Symphony No. 1
- 1988 – B for J, for flute, bass clarinet, trombone, vibraphone, electric organ, violin, viola, and cello
- 1989 – Quartet for piano, violin, viola, and cello
- 1988–90 – Symphony No. 2 "Celebration" (Khagiga: In Memoriam Leonard Bernstein)
- 1990 – Black Light, for orchestra
- 1991 – At the Far Edge, for orchestra
- 1992 – Symphony No. 3
- 1993 – Gateways, for orchestra
- 1993 – Symphony No. 4
- 1994 – Concerto for Piano and Orchestra
- 1995 – Embers, for flute and guitar
- 1997 – Concerto for Cello and Orchestra
- 1998-99 – Piano Variations
- 1999 - Piano Trio
- 2001 – Sonata for Violin and Piano
- 2002 - "Momentary Lapses", for Ben Verdery (guitar and violin)
- 2004 – New Set, for guitar and violin
- 2004 – Two Rages (Ragflections, No Time)
- 2006 – Why (?) Jacob for orchestra
- 2008 – Symphony No. 5
- 2011 – The Tin Angel (opera)
- 2016 – Divine Madness: An Oratorio
- 2017 – Iris for four-hand piano
- 2017 – Symphony No. 6 "Iris"

== Articles ==
=== Huffington Post ===
- 2012 - "Breath in a Ram's Horn: Why Classical Music is Like Jewish Prayer"
- 2013 - "An Open Letter to a New University President"
- 2013 - "The Put On of the Century"
- 2013 - "Final Response on The Put On of the Century"
- 2013 - "Carter is Dead"
- 2013 - "A Short Musing on Schuller's Musings"
- 2013 - "A London Sojourn"
- 2014 - "Butterfly, Bach, and Breasts in the Windy City, Part 1"
- 2014 - "The Case for Barber and Britten"
- 2014 - "In the Windy City Part 2"
- 2014 - "The Last of the Midwest for Now"
- 2014 - "Betsey Johnson in Tucson"
- 2014 - "Music I (Mostly) Hold Dear"
- 2014 - "Music I (Mostly) Hold Dear: Ligeti"
- 2014 - "Music I (Mostly) Hold Dear: Steve Reich"
- 2014 - "Music I (Mostly) Hold Dear: Glass"
- 2014 - "Music I (Mostly) Hold Dear: Takemitsu"
- 2014 - "Music I (Mostly) Hold Dear: Brown and Feldman"
- 2014 - "Music I (Mostly) Hold Dear: Beaser"
- 2014 - "Music I (Mostly) Hold Dear: John Adams"
- 2014 - "Music I (Mostly) Hold Dear: Frederic Rzewski"
- 2014 - "Tale of Two Concertos"
- 2014 - "Music I (Mostly) Hold Dear: John Corigliano and David Del Tredici"
- 2014 - "Music I (Mostly) Hold Dear: Robert Dick"
- 2014 - "Tito Munoz and the Phoenix Symphony"
- 2014 - "Music in the Southwest Part 2: The Tucson Symphony Orchestra"
- 2015 - "Music I (Mostly) Hold Dear: Lerdal String Quartets 1-3"
- 2015 - "Beethoven: Anguish and Triumph by Jan Swafford"
- 2015 - "Music I (Mostly) Hold Dear: George Rochberg"
- 2015 - "Concertos of Jaffe, Tower, Albert, and Rouse"
