= Lois Privor-Dumm =

American academic

Lois Privor-Dumm is an American public policy expert in the field of vaccine introduction.

Her work with new vaccine introduction, which has included strategies to accelerate access in low and middle-income countries, policy research, advocacy, communications and large country introduction. She currently serves as the Director of Alliances & Information at the International Vaccine Access Center (IVAC) at the Johns Hopkins Bloomberg School of Public Health. Her team conducts advocacy and communications for child health, coordination of the World Pneumonia Day Coalition and working with large countries such as India and Nigeria to provide technical assistance in the form of advocacy and communications, evidence synthesis, stakeholder mapping and research to help countries develop strategies to address the barriers to decision making and implementation for new vaccines.

Her team has worked closely with a variety of stakeholders in India and Nigeria and is focused on building both high-level political and grassroots support. She is currently leading projects in India and Nigeria made possible through grants from the GAVI Alliance and Bill & Melinda Gates Foundation.

She is a member of the GAVI Large Country Task Team and the PDP Access Steering Committee and has worked on a number of access related projects dealing with economics and financing, supply, distribution and demand forecasting in addition to her work with advocacy, communications and policy.

== Background and education ==
Ms. Privor-Dumm holds an International MBA (IMBA), formerly Masters in International Business (MIBS), from the University of South Carolina and completed her studies and internship in Brussels, Belgium. She completed her undergraduate studies at the University at Albany in Business Administration (Finance) and Spanish.

== Johns Hopkins Bloomberg School of Public Health ==
In 2005, she joined The Johns Hopkins Bloomberg School of Public Health to lead Communications & Strategy for the Hib Initiative, a GAVI-funded project with an aim to accelerate and sustain decisions regarding Hib vaccines to help prevent meningitis and pneumonia in children. Now serving as Director of Alliances and Information for IVAC, she has been cited as an expert for different global vaccine campaigns and been involved in research and promotion of vaccine awareness. She has been interviewed by Developments Magazine and African Press International about the availability of pneumonia related vaccines in African countries.

She worked on different communication tools regarding the availability of vaccines in developing countries to raise awareness about the value of pneumococcal and Hib vaccinations to prevent pneumonia and reach Millennium Development Goals 4 by 2015.

== Research ==
=== AVI-TAC ===
The mission of the Accelerated Vaccine Introduction Initiative (AVI) is to save lives, prevent disease and promote health through timely and equitable access to new and underused vaccines. Together, AVI partners serve to:

- Empower countries to make evidence-based decisions on new and underused vaccines.
- Support successful country introduction and sustained use of new and underused vaccines.
- Contribute analyses and assess impact of GAVI Alliance (GAVI) policies that influence accelerated introduction of new and underused vaccines.
- Ensure sufficient supply of new and underused vaccines of assured quality and meeting programmatic needs of developing countries.

The Accelerated Vaccine Initiative Technical Advisory Consortium (AVI TAC) supports the achievement of AVI objectives through its leadership in creating the evidence base, advocating for evidence-driven decision-making, and building platform capacity that can be used to accelerate the introduction of future vaccines.

== Publications ==
- Hajjeh, R.A.; Privor-Dumm, L.; Edmond, K.; o’Loughlin, R.; Shetty, S.; Griffiths, U.K.; Bear, A.P.; Cohen, A.L.; et al. (2010). "Supporting new vaccine introduction decisions: Lessons learned from the Hib Initiative experience". Vaccine. 28 (43): 7123–9. doi:10.1016/j.vaccine.2010.07.028. PMID 20659515.
- Bärnighausen, Till; Bloom, David E.; Canning, David; Friedman, Abigail; Levine, Orin S.; O'Brien, Jennifer; Privor-Dumm, Lois; Walker, Damian (2011). "Rethinking the benefits and costs of childhood vaccination: The example of the Haemophilus influenzae type b vaccine". Vaccine. 29 (13): 2371–80. doi:10.1016/j.vaccine.2010.11.090. PMID 21159324.
- Levine, Orin S.; Hajjeh, Rana; Wecker, John; Cherian, Thomas; o’Brien, Katherine L.; Knoll, Maria Deloria; Privor-Dumm, Lois; Kvist, Hans; et al. (2010). "A policy framework for accelerating adoption of new vaccines". Human Vaccines. 6 (12): 1021–4. doi:10.4161/hv.6.12.13076. PMC 3060382. PMID 21150269.
- Ojo, Linda R.; o’Loughlin, Rosalyn E.; Cohen, Adam L.; Loo, Jennifer D.; Edmond, Karen M.; Shetty, Sharmila S.; Bear, Allyson P.; Privor-Dumm, Lois; et al. (2010). "Global use of Haemophilus influenzae type b conjugate vaccine". Vaccine. 28 (43): 7117–22. doi:10.1016/j.vaccine.2010.07.074. PMID 20691265.
- Hib Vaccine Could Reduce Major Childhood Diseases
- Getting life-saving vaccines to those who need it most: the nuanced solution for access
- The Economic Case for Expanding Vaccination Coverage of Children
- What Happiness Looks Like: A Chance for Change on World Pneumonia Day
