= List of Department of the Interior appointments by Joe Biden =

Below is a list of nominations and appointments to the Department of Interior by Joe Biden, the 46th president of the United States. As of July 23, 2024, according to tracking by The Washington Post and Partnership for Public Service, 10 nominees have been confirmed, 2 nominees are being considered by the Senate, 4 positions do not have nominees, and 2 appointments have been made to positions that don't require Senate confirmation.

== Color key ==
Denotes appointees awaiting Senate confirmation.

Denotes appointees serving in an acting capacity.

Denotes appointees who have left office or offices which have been disbanded.

== Leadership & Office of the Secretary ==
Office	Nominee	Assumed office	Left office
— Secretary of the Interior	Deb Haaland	March 16, 2021 (Confirmed March 15, 2021, 51–40)	—
— Deputy Secretary of the Interior
— Deputy Secretary of the Interior	Laura Daniel-Davis	October 31, 2023	–
— Deputy Secretary of the Interior	Tommy Beaudreau	June 23, 2021 (Confirmed June 17, 2021, 88–9)	October 27, 2023
— Solicitor of the Interior	Robert Anderson	October 7, 2021 (Confirmed September 29, 2021, 53–44)	—

== Assistant Secretary for Fish and Wildlife and Parks ==
Office	Nominee	Assumed office	Left office
— Assistant Secretary of the Interior (Fish and Wildlife)	Shannon Estenoz	July 12, 2021 (Confirmed June 24, 2021 by voice vote)	—
National Park Service
— Director of the National Park Service	Charles Sams	December 16, 2021 (Confirmed November 18, 2021 by voice vote)	—
United States Fish and Wildlife Service
— Director of the United States Fish and Wildlife Service	Martha Williams	March 8, 2022 (Confirmed February 17, 2022 by voice vote)	—

== Offices of Indian Affairs & Insular Affairs ==
Office	Nominee	Assumed office	Left office
— Assistant Secretary of the Interior (Indian Affairs)	Bryan Newland	September 8, 2021 (Confirmed August 7, 2021 by voice vote)	—
— Assistant Secretary of the Interior (Insular Affairs)	Carmen Cantor	August 4, 2022 (Confirmed July 20, 2022 by voice vote)	—

== Office of Land and Minerals Management ==
Office	Nominee	Assumed office	Left office
Bureau of Land Management
— Director of the Bureau of Land Management	Tracy Stone-Manning	October 7, 2021 (Confirmed September 30, 2021, 50–45)	January 13, 2025
Bureau of Ocean Energy Management
— Director of the Bureau of Ocean Energy Management	Elizabeth Klein	January 19, 2023	—
— Director of the Bureau of Ocean Energy Management	Amanda Lefton	February 2, 2021	January 19, 2023
Bureau of Safety and Environmental Enforcement
— Director of the Bureau of Safety and Environmental Enforcement	Kevin M. Sligh	March 24, 2022	—

== Office of Water and Science ==
Office	Nominee	Assumed office	Left office
— Assistant Secretary of the Interior (Water and Science)	Tanya Trujillo	June 25, 2021 (Confirmed June 17, 2021 by voice vote)	July 17, 2023
Bureau of Reclamation
— Commissioner of the Bureau of Reclamation	M. Camille Calimlim Touton	December 15, 2021 (Confirmed November 4, 2021 by voice vote)	—
United States Geological Survey
— Director of the United States Geological Survey	David Applegate	August 15, 2022 (Confirmed August 4, 2022 by voice vote)	—

== Withdrawn nominations ==
Office	Nominee	Announced	Withdrawn	Notes
— Deputy Secretary of the Interior	Elizabeth Klein	January 18, 2021	March 22, 2021	Her nomination was not formally sent to the Senate.
— Deputy Secretary of the Interior	Shannon Estenoz	May 9, 2024	January 3, 2025	Nomination expired
— Assistant Secretary of the Interior (Policy, Management, and Budget)	Winnie Stachelberg	April 14, 2021	January 3, 2022	Her nomination was not resent upon expiration; she was instead appointed as infrastructure coordinator at the Department of the Interior in December 2021.
— Assistant Secretary of the Interior (Land and Minerals Management)	Laura Daniel-Davis	June 18, 2021	November 1, 2023	
— Chair of the National Indian Gaming Commission	Patrice Kunesh	July 23, 2024	January 3, 2025	Nomination expired

== See also ==
- Cabinet of Joe Biden, for the vetting process undergone by top-level roles including advice and consent by the Senate
- List of executive branch 'czars' e.g. Special Advisor to the President

== Notes ==
Confirmation votes

Confirmations by roll call vote

Confirmations by voice vote
