= List of Department of the Interior appointments by Donald Trump =

Key
Appointees serving in offices that did not require Senate confirmation.
Appointees confirmed by the Senate who are currently serving or served through the entire term.
Appointees awaiting Senate confirmation.
Appointees serving in an acting capacity.
Appointees who have left office after confirmation or offices which have been disbanded.
Nominees who were withdrawn prior to being confirmed or assuming office.

== Appointments (first administration) ==
Office	Nominee	Assumed office	Left office
Secretary of the Interior	David Bernhardt	April 11, 2019 (Confirmed April 11, 2025, 56–41)	January 20, 2021
Secretary of the Interior	David Bernhardt	January 2, 2019	April 11, 2019
Secretary of the Interior	Ryan Zinke	March 1, 2017 (Confirmed March 1, 2017, 68–31)	January 2, 2019
Deputy Secretary of the Interior	Katharine MacGregor	February 25, 2020 (Confirmed February 25, 2020, 58-38)	January 20, 2021
Deputy Secretary of the Interior	Katharine MacGregor	September 30, 2019	February 25, 2020
Deputy Secretary of the Interior	David Bernhardt	August 1, 2017 (Confirmed July 24, 2017, 53–43)	April 11, 2019
Deputy Secretary of the Interior	Julie Lillie	January 20, 2017	August 1, 2017
Solicitor of the Interior	Daniel Habib Jorjani	September 26, 2019 (Confirmed September 24, 2019, 51–43)	January 20, 2021
Solicitor of the Interior	Ryan Douglas Nelson	Nomination withdrawn by the President on May 10, 2018	
Assistant Secretary of the Interior (Fish and Wildlife)	Robert Wallace	June 30, 2019 (Confirmed June 27, 2019, voice vote)	January 20, 2021
Assistant Secretary of the Interior (Insular Affairs)	Douglas Domenech	September 18, 2017 (Confirmed September 13, 2017, voice vote)	January 20, 2021
Assistant Secretary of the Interior (Land and Minerals Management)	Joe Balash	December 7, 2017 (Confirmed December 7, 2017, 61–38)	August 2019
Assistant Secretary of the Interior (Policy, Management, and Budget)	Susan Combs	June 5, 2019 (Confirmed June 5, 2019, 57–36)	April 25, 2020
Assistant Secretary of the Interior (Water and Science)	Timothy R. Petty	January 31, 2018 (Confirmed December 21, 2017, voice vote)	January 20, 2021
Assistant Secretary of the Interior (Indian Affairs)	Tara Sweeney	July 9, 2018 (Confirmed June 28, 2018, voice vote)	January 20, 2021
Inspector General of the Interior	Mark Greenblatt	August 26, 2019 (Confirmed August 1, 2019, voice vote)	January 24, 2025
National Park Service
Director of the National Park Service	Margaret Everson	August 7, 2020	January 20, 2021
Director of the National Park Service	David Vela		
Director of the National Park Service	David Vela	Nomination lapsed and returned to the President on January 3, 2019	
Director of the National Park Service	David Vela	October 1, 2019	August 7, 2020
Director of the National Park Service	P. Daniel Smith	January 24, 2018	September 30, 2019
Director of the National Park Service	Michael T. Reynolds	January 3, 2017	January 24, 2018
Member of the Board of Directors of the Presidio Trust	William Ellison Grayson	May 2017	
Member of the Board of Directors of the Presidio Trust	Marie Louise Hurabiell		
Member of the Board of Directors of the Presidio Trust	John W. Keker		
Member of the Board of Directors of the Presidio Trust	Lynne K. Benioff		
Member of the Board of Directors of the Presidio Trust	Carole McNeil		
Office of Surface Mining Reclamation and Enforcement
Director of the Office of Surface Mining Reclamation and Enforcement	Lanny Erdos	December 3, 2020 (Confirmed December 3, 2020, voice vote)	January 20, 2021
Director of the Office of Surface Mining Reclamation and Enforcement	Lanny Erdos	September 1, 2019	December 3, 2020
United States Fish and Wildlife Service
Director of the United States Fish and Wildlife Service	Aurelia Skipwith	January 6, 2020 (Confirmed December 12, 2019, 52–39)	January 20, 2021
United States Bureau of Land Management
Director of the Bureau of Land Management
Director of the Bureau of Land Management	William Perry Pendley	July 29, 2019	September 25, 2020
Director of the Bureau of Land Management	William Perry Pendley	Nomination withdrawn by the President on September 8, 2020	
Director of the Bureau of Land Management	Brian Steed	November 16, 2017	July 29, 2019
Director of the Bureau of Land Management	Michael Nedd	March 15, 2017	November 15, 2017
Director of the Bureau of Land Management	Kristin Bail	January 20, 2017	March 14, 2017
United States Geological Survey
Director of the United States Geological Survey	James F. Reilly	May 14, 2018 (Confirmed April 9, 2018, voice vote)	January 20, 2021
United States Bureau of Reclamation
Commissioner of the Bureau of Reclamation	Brenda Burman	November 17, 2017 (Confirmed November 16, 2017, voice vote)	January 20, 2021

== Appointments (second administration) ==
Office	Nominee	Assumed office	Left office
Secretary of the Interior	Doug Burgum	February 1, 2025 (Confirmed January 30, 2025, 80–17)	
Secretary of the Interior	Walter Cruickshank	January 20, 2025	February 1, 2025
Deputy Secretary of the Interior	Katharine MacGregor	June 9, 2025 (Confirmed May 14, 2025, 54–40)	
Solicitor of the Interior	William L. Doffermyre	October 15, 2025 (Confirmed* September 18, 2025, 51–44); *En bloc confirmation of 48 nominees.	May 26, 2026
Assistant Secretary of the Interior for Indian Affairs	William Kirkland III	October 9, 2025 (Confirmed* October 7, 2025, 51–47); *En bloc confirmation of 107 nominees.	
Assistant Secretary of the Interior for Indian Affairs	Janel Broderick	September 3, 2025	October 9, 2025
Assistant Secretary of the Interior for Indian Affairs	Scott Davis	March 18, 2025	September 3, 2025
Assistant Secretary of the Interior for Indian Affairs	Bryan Mercier	January 20, 2025	March 18, 2025
Assistant Secretary of the Interior for Land and Minerals Management	Leslie Beyer	October 1, 2025 (Confirmed* September 18, 2025, 51–44); *En bloc confirmation of 48 nominees.	December 19, 2025
Assistant Secretary of the Interior for Water and Science	Andrea Travnicek	October 1, 2025 (Confirmed* September 18, 2025, 51–44); *En bloc confirmation of 48 nominees.	
Assistant Secretary for Fish and Wildlife	Kevin Lilly	September 22, 2026 (Confirmed* August 7, 2026, 51–47); *En bloc confirmation of 74 nominees.	
Assistant Secretary for Fish and Wildlife	Kevin Lilly	July 31, 2025	September 22, 2026
Assistant Secretary for Insular, International and Ocean Affairs	William W. Hauge	September 22, 2026 (Confirmed* August 7, 2026, 51–47); *En bloc confirmation of 74 nominees.	
Assistant Secretary for Insular, International and Ocean Affairs	William W. Hauge	May 2025	September 22, 2026
Inspector General of the Interior	Dennis Kirk	Awaiting Senate Confirmation	
Director of the Bureau of Land Management	Steve Pearce	May 20, 2026 (Confirmed* May 18, 2026, 46–43); *En bloc confirmation of 49 nominees.	
Director of the Bureau of Land Management	Kathleen Sgamma	Nomination withdrawn by the President on April 10, 2025	
Director of the Bureau of Land Management	Bill Groffy	June 25, 2025	May 20, 2026
Director of the Bureau of Land Management	Jon Raby	January 28, 2025	June 25, 2025
Director of the National Park Service	Scott Socha	Nomination withdrawn by the President on April 27, 2026	
Director of the National Park Service	Jessica Bowron	January 20, 2025	
Director of the Office of Surface Mining Reclamation and Enforcement	Lanny Erdos	November 25, 2025 (Confirmed* October 7, 2025, 51–47); *En bloc confirmation of 107 nominees.	
Director of the United States Fish and Wildlife Service	Brian Nesvik	August 18, 2025 (Confirmed August 1, 2025, 54–43)	
Director of the United States Fish and Wildlife Service	Justin "J" Shirley	July 21, 2025	August 18, 2025
Director of the United States Fish and Wildlife Service	Paul Souza	January 20, 2025	July 21, 2025
Director of the United States Geological Survey	Ned Mamula	November 18, 2025 (Confirmed* October 7, 2025, 51–47); *En bloc confirmation of 107 nominees.	
Director of the United States Geological Survey	Sarah J. Ryker	January 20, 2025	November 18, 2025
Commissioner of the Bureau of Reclamation	Theodore Cooke	Nomination withdrawn by the President on September 30, 2025	

== Notes ==
=== Confirmation votes ===
Confirmations by roll call vote (first administration)

Confirmations by voice vote (first administration)

Confirmations by roll call vote (second administration)

Confirmations by voice vote (second administration)
