= Julie Lillie =

American government official

United States Deputy Secretary of the Interior
- Acting
- In office January 20, 2017 – August 1, 2017
- President: Donald Trump
- Preceded by: Michael L. Connor
- Succeeded by: David Bernhardt

Julie Lillie is an American government official who served as the acting Deputy Secretary of the Interior from January to August 2017. She concurrently served as the director of executive secretariat and regulatory affairs.

== See also ==
- Environmental policy of the first Donald Trump administration

Political offices
Preceded by Michael L. Connor	United States Deputy Secretary of the Interior; 2017	Succeeded by David Bernhardt
