= Laura Daniel-Davis =

American government official

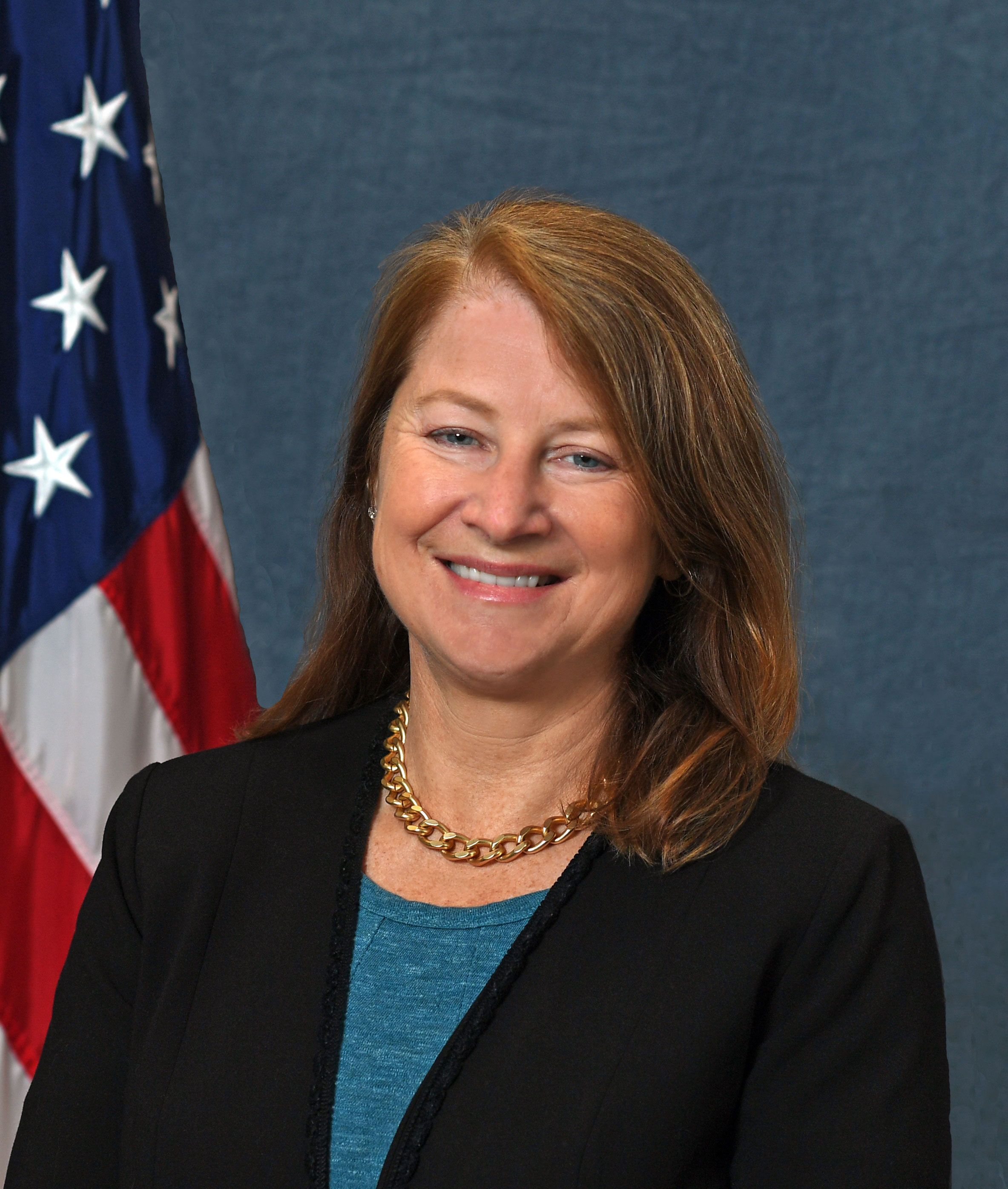
- Official portrait, 2024

Acting United States Deputy Secretary of the Interior
- In office October 31, 2023 – January 20, 2025
- President: Joe Biden
- Preceded by: Tommy Beaudreau
- Succeeded by: Katharine MacGregor

Personal details
- Education: Wake Forest University (BA)

Laura Daniel-Davis is a former American government official who served as acting deputy secretary of the interior, following the resignation of Tommy Beaudreau.

== Education ==
Daniel-Davis earned a Bachelor of Arts degree in political science and government from Wake Forest University in Winston-Salem, North Carolina.

== Career ==
Daniel-Davis worked as a senior policy and business development manager at Latham & Watkins. From 2007 to 2009, she was the deputy chief of staff for then-congressman Mark Udall from Colorado. She then joined the United States Department of the Interior during the Obama administration, serving as associate deputy secretary and chief of staff. From 2018 to 2020, she was the vice president of the National Wildlife Federation for conservation strategy and later worked as Chief of Policy and Advocacy for the organization. At the start of the Biden administration, Daniel-Davis was selected as principal deputy assistant secretary of the interior for land and minerals management.

On October 31, 2023, Daniel-Davis was appointed as acting deputy secretary of the interior, succeeding Tommy Beaudreau.

=== Interior Department nomination ===
On June 18, 2021, President Joe Biden nominated Daniel-Davis to be the assistant secretary of the interior for land and minerals management. Hearings on her nomination were held before the Senate Energy Committee on September 21, 2021. The committee deadlocked on the nomination on November 18, 2021. Daniel-Davis' nomination was not acted upon for the rest of the year, and was returned to President Biden on January 3, 2022.

President Biden renominated her the following day. On February 8, 2022, the committee held a second round of hearings on the nomination. The committee again deadlocked on the nomination in a party-line vote on July 21, 2022. The entire Senate must move to discharge the nomination from the committee in order to progress.

On March 10, 2023, Senator Joe Manchin, who chairs the Energy Committee, said he would not advance Daniel-Davis' nomination due to a disagreement with the Biden administration. Her nomination was withdrawn on November 1, 2023.
