= Lynn Scarlett =

American government official, policy executive and analyst

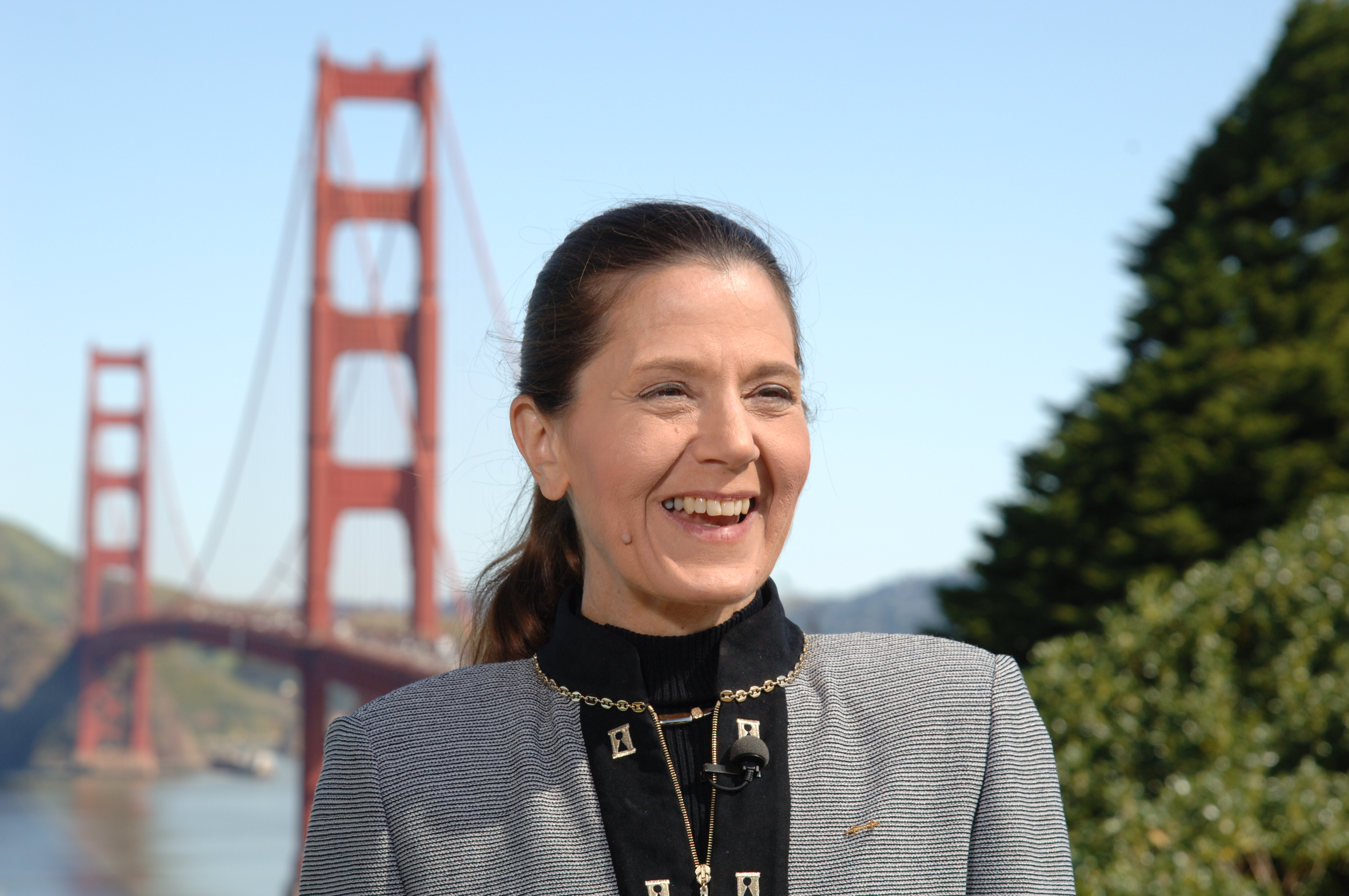
- Scarlett in 2006

4th United States Deputy Secretary of the Interior
- In office November 22, 2005 – May 22, 2009
- President: George W. Bush; Barack Obama
- Preceded by: J. Steven Griles
- Succeeded by: David J. Hayes

Acting United States Secretary of the Interior
- In office January 19, 2009 – January 20, 2009
- President: George W. Bush; Barack Obama
- Preceded by: Dirk Kempthorne
- Succeeded by: Ken Salazar
- In office April 1, 2006 – May 26, 2006
- President: George W. Bush
- Preceded by: Gale Norton
- Succeeded by: Dirk Kempthorne

Personal details
- Born: Patricia Lynn Scarlett
- Party: Independent
- Education: University of California, Santa Barbara (BA, MA)
- Website: lynnscarlett.com

Patricia Lynn Scarlett is an American government official, environmental policy executive and analyst who served as United States Deputy Secretary of the Interior from 2005 until 2009. She is a frequent commentator on environmental issues.

== Career ==
Scarlett was the Chief Operating Officer and Deputy Secretary of the Interior from 2005 to 2009, having previously served as the Assistant Secretary of Policy, Management and Budget from 2001 to 2005. Appointed by President George W. Bush, Scarlett was sworn in as Deputy Secretary of the Interior on November 22, 2005. In 2006 she served as acting Secretary of the Interior between the administrations of Gale Norton and Dirk Kempthorne. While at DOI she chaired the federal Wildland Fire Leadership Council (2004–05). She also co-chaired the First Lady's Preserve America Initiative on historic preservation (2003–08). She also chaired DOI's Climate Change Task Force, which examined the effects of climate change on land, water, wildlife and infrastructure. Scarlett convened and chaired the Department's Cooperative Conservation Working Group, and also represented the Department on an interagency cooperative conservation task force that planned and convened the White House Conference on Cooperative Conservation in 2005. In her management capacities, Scarlett served on the President's Management Council and its executive steering committee.

Before joining the administration, Scarlett was President of the Reason Foundation in Los Angeles, California, an organization where she had previously as a policy analyst and senior manager. From 2010–2013 she was Co-Director, Center for the Management of Ecological Wealth at Resources for the Future.

She was a member of the national Commission on Climate and Tropical Forests, and of several National Research Council committees. She served on the boards of the National Parks Conservation Association, the National Wildlife Refuge Association, as well as acting as an advisor to several private-sector firms. She was Chair of the board of the American Hiking Society and of RESOLVE. She is a trustee emeritus of the Udall Foundation. She is Chair of the Science Advisory Board for the National Oceanic and Atmospheric Administration.

In 2009, she was elected as Fellow of the National Academy of Public Administration. In 2014, she was awarded the Sustained Achievement Award of the Renewable Natural Resources Foundation, recognizing her long-term contribution and commitment to the protection and conservation of natural resources. Also in 2014, she was appointed to the US Blue Ribbon Panel on Sustaining America's Diverse Fish and Wildlife Resources.

Until December 2021, she was the Chief External Affairs Officer at the Nature Conservancy.

== By Lynn Scarlett ==
- Large Landscape Conservation: A Strategic Framework for Policy and Action, 2010
- Evolutionary Ecology: A new environmental vision, a 1996 article
- Smogged Down, a 1996 column about air pollution
- Packaging, Recycling, and Solid Waste, a 1997 policy study
- Solid Waste Recycling Costs, a 1995 policy study
- The Last Picture Postcard, a 2001 book review
- "The Poetry of Rachel Carson"
