= Safeguarding Americans from Extremism Act of 2023 =

- Long title: To prohibit the Secretary of Homeland Security or the Secretary of State, as applicable, from approving any application for or issuing a nonimmigrant or immigrant visa to nationals of Palestine.
- Acronyms (colloquial): SAFE Act of 2023
- Announced in: the 118th United States Congress
- Number of co-sponsors: 16

Legislative history
- Introduced in the House of Representatives as H.R. 6211 by Ryan Zinke (R–MT) on November 2, 2023; Committee consideration by United States House Committee on the Judiciary

The Safeguarding Americans from Extremism Act of 2023 (H.R. 6211), or the SAFE Act of 2023, is a proposed bill introduced in the 118th session of the United States Congress. Introduced on November 2, 2023, by Representative Ryan Zinke (R-MT) in response to the Gaza war, the legislation would prohibit Palestinians from entering the United States, and revoke visas, refugee status, or asylum granted to Palestinians on or after October 1.

In a statement, Zinke boasted that the bill constitutes the "most anti-Hamas immigration legislation I have seen and it’s well deserved". Zinke touted the legislation as a bill to "Expel Palestinians from the United States" on his congressional website.

== Background ==
Following the October 7 Hamas attack, a coalition of Republican lawmakers wrote to Secretary of State Antony Blinken and Secretary of Homeland Security Alejandro Mayorkas to deport individuals on student visas who were determined to have "expressed support for Hamas".

== Legislative provisions ==
Under the legislation, Secretary of Homeland Security Alejandro Mayorkas would be prohibited from giving Temporary Protected Status (TPS), refugee or asylum status to individuals with Palestinian Authority passports.

The bill would mandate the Department of Homeland Security (DHS) collaborates with officials from U.S. Immigration and Customs Enforcement (ICE) and United States Citizenship and Immigration Services (USCIS) to “identify” individuals “without lawful status, including newly revoked status" in order to deport them.

== Legislative history ==
=== Original cosponsors ===
The legislation received ten original co-sponsors in the House of Representatives: Representatives Andy Harris (R-MD), Aaron Bean (R-FL), Ralph Norman (R-SC), Scott DesJarlais (R-TN), Clay Higgins (R-LA), Ronny Jackson (R-TX), Bill Posey (R-FL), Barry Moore (R-AL), Marjorie Taylor Greene (R-GA) and Andy Biggs (R-AZ).

=== Additional cosponsors ===
H.R.6211 has since been co-sponsored by six additional members: Representatives Claudia Tenney (R-NY), Bob Good (R-VA), Matt Rosendale (R-MT), Jim Baird (R-IN), Jeff Duncan (R-SC), and Brian Babin (R-TX).

== Public response ==
=== Response in Congress ===
The legislation was strongly condemned as "fascism and pure bigotry" by the three sitting Muslim members of Congress, Representatives Rashida Tlaib (D-MI), Ilhan Omar (D-MN), and André Carson (D-IN). The bill was also condemned by a pair of two Jewish Democratic members of Congress, Greg Landsman (D-OH) and Dan Goldman (D-NY), who are both considered pro-Israel on policy matters.

Landsman and Goldmans' resolution condemned the bill as "un-American, bigoted, and is designed to inflame tensions which could result in violence", and says the legislation "dangerously conflates Palestinians with Hamas". Other Democratic members of Congress, including Ritchie Torres (D-NY) and Barbara Lee (D-CA), also condemned the legislation.

In response, Zinke stood by the bill, arguing that Democrats are trying to "distract from Biden's foreign policy failures that they're trying to start identity and culture wars".

=== Other reception ===
Sherrilyn Ifill, the former president of the NAACP Legal Defense Fund, condemned the bill as a "degrading act of xenophobic public targeting", arguing that Zinke was "not fit for public service". A coalition of students at the University of Wyoming circled a petition in opposition to the legislation.

== Similar legislation ==
On October 17, 2023, Senator Steve Daines (R-MT) introduced the "Guaranteeing Aggressors Zero Admission (GAZA) Act". The legislation would prohibit the federal government from giving visas to Palestinians. The bill would also prevent Palestinians from entering the United States through the DHS's parole program.
