= Ryan Zinke =

American politician (born 1961)

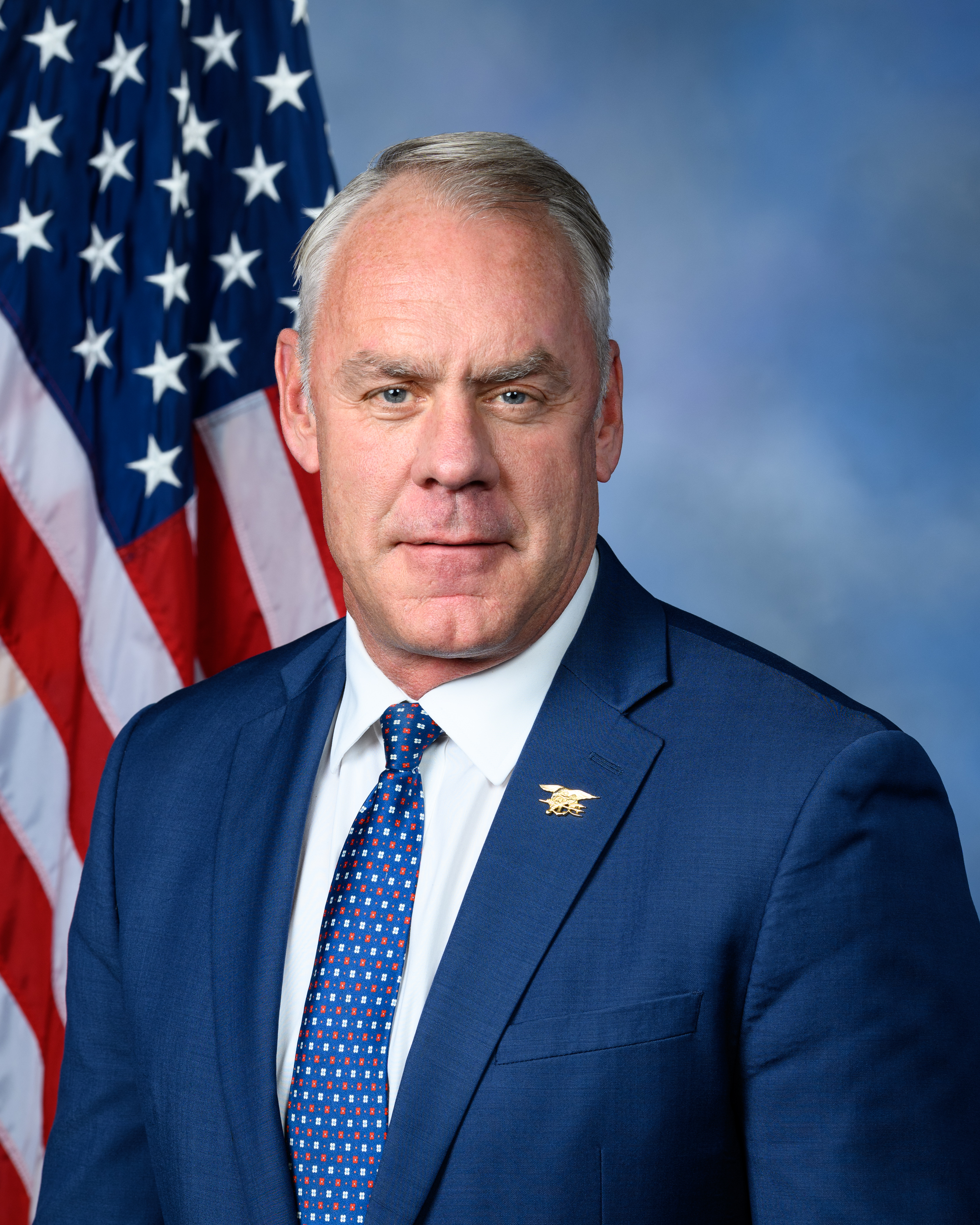
- Official portrait, 2023

Member of the U.S. House of Representatives from Montana
- Incumbent
- Assumed office January 3, 2023
- Preceded by: Constituency reestablished (Note: From 1913 to 1993, Montana had two congressional seats, after which, the 2nd district was eliminated and the remaining seat was elected at-large.)
- Constituency: 1st district
- In office January 3, 2015 – March 1, 2017
- Preceded by: Steve Daines
- Succeeded by: Greg Gianforte
- Constituency: At-large district

52nd United States Secretary of the Interior
- In office March 1, 2017 – January 2, 2019
- President: Donald Trump
- Deputy: David Bernhardt
- Preceded by: Sally Jewell
- Succeeded by: David Bernhardt

Member of the Montana Senate from the 2nd district
- In office January 3, 2009 – January 3, 2013
- Preceded by: Dan Weinberg
- Succeeded by: Dee L. Brown

Personal details
- Born: Ryan Keith Zinke; November 1, 1961 (age 65) Bozeman, Montana, U.S.
- Party: Republican
- Spouse: Lolita Hand (m. 1992)
- Children: 3
- Education: University of Oregon (BS); National University (MBA); University of San Diego (MS)
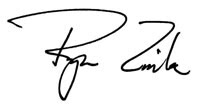
- Signature
- Website: House website Campaign website

Military service
- Branch/service: United States Navy
- Years of service: 1986–2008
- Rank: Commander
- Unit: United States Navy SEALs; SEAL Team Six; SEAL Team One; NSWU-2; Naval Special Warfare Center
- Awards: Bronze Star Medal (2); Defense Meritorious Service Medal (2); Meritorious Service Medal (4); Joint Service Commendation Medal (2); Army Commendation Medal
- Zinke's voice Zinke on harassment in the U.S. Interior Department. Recorded December 14, 2017

Ryan Keith Zinke (/ˈzɪŋki/ ZING-kee; born November 1, 1961) is an American politician and businessman serving as the U.S. representative for Montana's 1st congressional district since 2023. A member of the Republican Party, Zinke served in the Montana Senate from 2009 to 2013 and as the U.S. representative for the at-large congressional district from 2015 to 2017. He served as the United States secretary of the interior under president Donald Trump from 2017 until his resignation in 2019 following a series of ethics inquiries.

Zinke graduated from college before serving as a U.S. Navy SEAL from 1986 until 2008, retiring as a commander. The first SEAL to be elected to the U.S. House of Representatives, he formerly served as a member of the Natural Resources Committee and the Armed Services Committee. As a member of Congress, Zinke supported the use of ground troops in the Middle East to combat ISIS, and opposed the Affordable Care Act, various environmental regulations, and the transfer of federal lands to individual states.

Zinke was appointed secretary of the interior by Trump. He was confirmed on March 1, 2017, becoming the first SEAL and the first Montanan since statehood to occupy a Cabinet position.

As Secretary, Zinke opened some federal lands for oil, gas and mineral exploration and extraction. His actions as interior secretary raised ethical questions and were investigated by the Interior Department's Office of Inspector General. In October 2018, the Interior's inspector general referred the investigation to the Department of Justice. On December 15, 2018, Trump announced that Zinke would leave his post as of January 2, 2019, to be replaced by his deputy, David Bernhardt. The Inspector General's report concluded that Zinke had repeatedly violated ethical rules and then lied to investigators.

On March 2, 2026, Zinke announced he would not seek re-election in 2026. He endorsed combat veteran and talk radio host Aaron Flint to succeed him, but Flint then lost the election to Sam Forstag.

== Early life and education ==
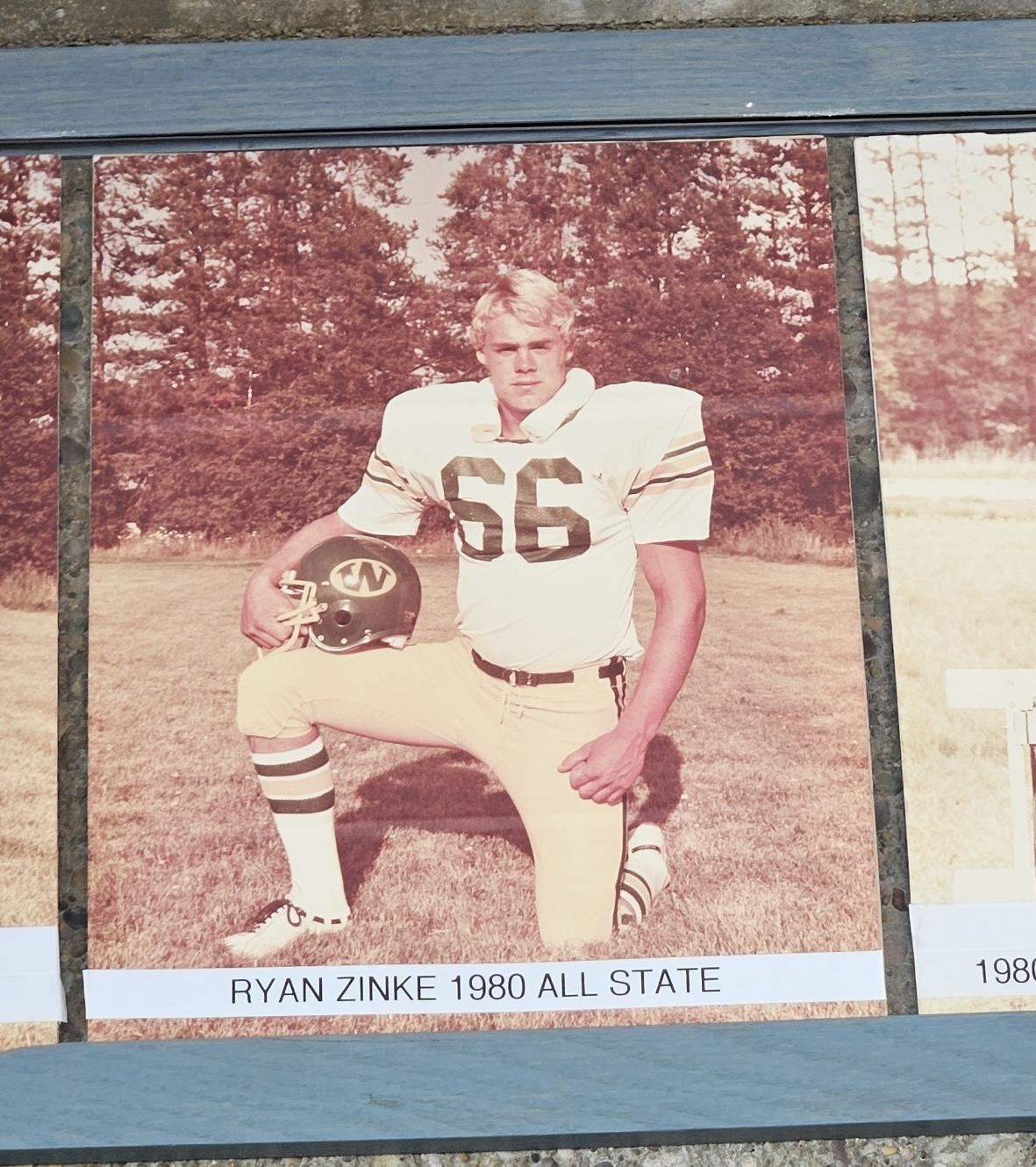
Ryan Zinke's All State football photo at Whitefish High School

Zinke was born in Bozeman, Montana, and raised in Whitefish. He is the son of Jean Montana Harlow Petersen and Ray Dale Zinke, a plumber. He was an Eagle Scout. He was a star athlete at Whitefish High School and accepted a football scholarship to the University of Oregon in Eugene; recruited as an outside linebacker, he switched to offense and was an undersized starting center for the Oregon Ducks in the Pac-10 under head coach Rich Brooks. Zinke earned a bachelor of science degree in geology in 1984 and graduated with honors. He intended to pursue a career in underwater geology. Despite never working as a geologist, Zinke publicly calls himself a geologist. He earned a master's degree in business administration from National University in 1993 and a Master of Science degree in global leadership from the University of San Diego in 2003.

== Military career ==
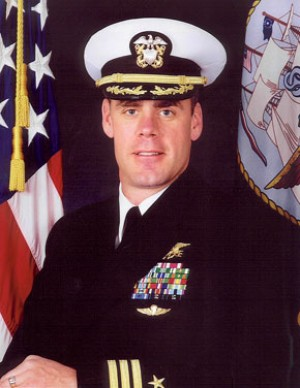
Zinke during his service in the U.S. Navy

Zinke served as a U.S. Navy SEAL from 1986 to 2008, retiring at the rank of commander. He graduated from Basic Underwater Demolition/SEAL training (BUD/S) class 136 in February 1986 and subsequently served with SEAL Team ONE. Following SEAL Tactical Training and completion of a six-month probationary period, he received the 1130 designator as a Naval Special Warfare Officer, entitled to wear the Special Warfare insignia also known as "SEAL Trident". Zinke was assigned as a First Phase Officer of BUD/S from 1988 to 1991. In 1991, he received orders to United States Naval Special Warfare Development Group (NSWDG) and completed a specialized selection and training course. Zinke served at the command until 1993, during which time he planned, rehearsed, and took part in carrying out classified operations. He then served as a Plans officer for Commander in Chief, U.S. Naval Forces, Europe and served a second tour with NSWDG as team leader, ground force commander, task force commander and current operations officer from 1996 to 1999.

In the late 1990s, Zinke paid back the Navy $211 after improperly billing the government for personal travel expenses. His former commanding officer, retired vice admiral Albert M. Calland III, said that as a result, Zinke received a June 1999 Fitness Report that blocked him from being promoted to a commanding officer position or to the rank of captain. Zinke acknowledged the error but maintains that the incident did not adversely affect his career. His promotion from lieutenant commander to commander was approved the next year.

From 1999 to 2001, Zinke served as executive officer for Naval Special Warfare Unit Two and then as executive officer, Naval Special Warfare Center from 2001 to 2004. In 2004, Zinke was the deputy and acting commander of the Combined Joint Special Operations Task Force-Arabian Peninsula. His campaign website stated that he was "the deputy and acting commander" of Combined Joint Special Operations Task Force–Arabian Peninsula and "led a force of more than 3,500 Special Operations personnel in Iraq" in 2004. Retired Major General Michael S. Repass, who was Zinke's superior in Iraq, told The New York Times that these claims "might be a stretch" but that Zinke "did a good job" and was "a competent guy". After his tours in Iraq, Zinke served "as the second-ranking officer (and briefly acting commander) of the main SEAL training center." In 2006, he was selected to establish the Naval Special Warfare Advanced Training Command, serving as dean of the graduate school until his retirement from active duty in 2008. The graduate school had 250 educators, offering over 43 college-level courses to over 2,500 students annually at 15 different locations worldwide. Zinke retired from the Navy in 2008.

== Business ventures ==
In 2005, Zinke formed Continental Divide International, a property management and business development consulting company. His family members are officers of the company. In 2009, Zinke formed the consulting company On Point Montana. He served on the board of the oil pipeline company QS Energy (formerly Save the World Air) from 2012 to 2015. In November 2014, Zinke announced that he would pass Continental Divide to his family while remaining in an advisory role.

In January 2019, Zinke began a new job as the managing director of Artillery One, a cryptocurrency investment firm founded by investor Daniel Cannon, saying that he was "going to make Artillery One great again." In an interview, he said:

"I'm focused on cybersecurity, protection of infrastructure and emerging countries that can act as a test bed for new technologies. There is some suspicion that blockchain does not really work. We think it does and we want to showcase the utility and flexibility of the model."

The company is working on a test bed project in Kosovo, where Zinke served during his time in the U.S. Navy. Zinke also took consulting jobs with several energy firms.

== Political career ==
=== Montana Senate (2009–2013) ===
Zinke was elected to the Montana Senate in 2008, serving from 2009 to 2013, representing the city of Whitefish. While serving in the State Senate, he "was widely seen as a moderate Republican" but drifted to the right. Zinke was selected as chair of the Senate Education Committee and promoted technology in the classroom, rural access to education and local control over schools. He also served on the Senate Finance and Claims Committee. As a state senator, Zinke was also a member of the SEMA-supported State Automotive Enthusiast and Leadership Caucus, a bipartisan group of state lawmakers sharing an appreciation for automobiles.

In 2008, Zinke said he "support[s] increased coal production for electrical generation and believe[s] it can and should be done with adequate environmental safeguards" and that he "believe[s] the use of alternate energy sources and clean coal is preferred over petroleum based fuels". In 2010, he signed a letter calling global warming "a threat multiplier for instability in the most volatile regions of the world" and saying that "the clean energy and climate challenge is America's new space race". The letter spoke of "catastrophic" costs and "unprecedented economic consequences" that would result from failing to act on climate change and asked President Barack Obama and Speaker of the House Nancy Pelosi to champion sweeping clean energy and climate legislation.

In 2013, Zinke hosted a radio show in which he engaged with and promoted fringe conspiratorial views, including birtherism (the contention that Obama was not born in the United States). Zinke said on the show that he was not sure whether Obama was a foreign citizen and called on Obama to release his college transcripts. Later, in 2016, as a congressman, Zinke appeared on the radio show Where's Obama's Birth Certificate, known for its promotion of birther conspiracy theories.

=== Elections ===
==== 2012 campaign for lieutenant governor ====
Zinke was the running mate of Montana gubernatorial candidate Neil Livingstone in the 2012 election. The Livingstone/Zinke ticket won 8.8% of the vote, a total of 12,038 votes, and finished fifth out of seven in the Republican primary. The eventual nominees, Rick Hill and Jon Sonju, lost the general election to the Democratic nominees, Attorney General Steve Bullock and Montana National Guardsman John Walsh.

In 2012, Zinke founded a super PAC named Special Operations for America, or SOFA, to support Mitt Romney's 2012 presidential campaign. It raised over $100,000 and paid $28,258 to Continental Divide International, Zinke's company, for fundraising consulting. Zinke appointed right-wing commentator Paul E. Vallely, a promoter of "birther" claims and other anti-Obama conspiracy theories, to SOFA's board. Zinke announced he was resigning as chairman of SOFA on September 30, 2013, with his friend former Navy SEAL Gary Stubblefield taking his place. While Zinke's financial disclosure report for 2014 listed him as chairman of SOFA, SOFA had been making independent expenditures in support of Zinke's campaign since November 20, 2013. In 2014, the Campaign Legal Center and Democracy 21 filed a complaint with the Federal Election Commission regarding coordination between Zinke's campaign and SOFA. As of December 2016, the FEC had taken no action on the matter.

==== 2014 House election ====
In the spring of 2014, Zinke announced his candidacy for Montana's at-large congressional district, a seat vacated when the incumbent, Steve Daines, successfully sought a seat in the U.S. Senate.

During the Republican primary, Zinke attracted attention for calling Hillary Rodham Clinton "the real enemy" and the "anti-Christ." He touted his anti-abortion credentials and was endorsed by the Montana Right to Life Association.

Zinke won the five-way Republican primary with 43,766 votes (33.25%) and defeated Libertarian perennial candidate Mike Fellows and Democratic nominee John Lewis, a former state director for U.S. Senator Max Baucus, in the general election, with 55.4% of the nearly 350,000 votes cast statewide.

==== 2016 House election ====
In 2016, Zinke ran unopposed in the Republican primary on June 7 and faced the Democratic nominee, Superintendent of Public Instruction Denise Juneau in the general election on November 8. He defeated Juneau with 56% of the vote.

=== U.S. House of Representatives (2015–2017) ===
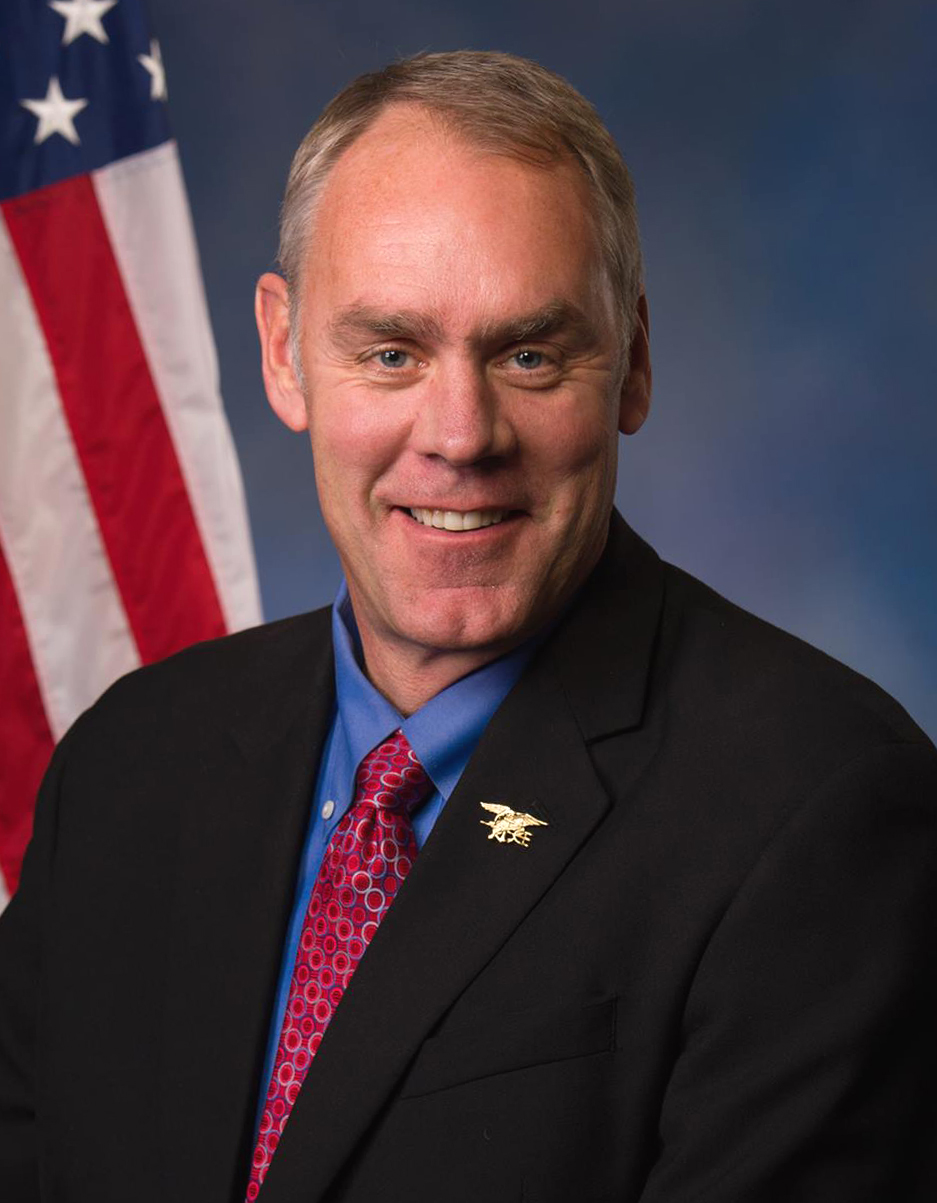
Zinke during the 114th Congress

In Congress, Zinke supported the deployment of U.S. ground troops to combat ISIS, "abandoning" the Affordable Care Act, and cutting regulations. He supported a Republican effort to repeal the estate tax.

Zinke condemned the "anti-Semitic views" held by neo-Nazis planning a march in support of Richard B. Spencer in Whitefish, Montana, in January 2017.

==== Political positions ====
===== Education =====
In 2015, Zinke voted for an amendment proposed by Congressman Dave Loebsack that provided for the expansion of the use of digital learning through the establishment of a competitive grant program to implement and evaluate the results of technology-based learning practices. The amendment passed, 218–213, but stalled and died in the Senate.

===== Environmental regulation =====
Zinke frequently voted in opposition to environmentalists on issues including coal extraction and oil and gas drilling. When Trump opened nearly all U.S. coastal waters to extractive drilling, rescinding Obama's restrictions a dozen coastal states out of 30 total protested. Zinke visited with Florida governor Ron DeSantis and exempted only Florida's coast from drilling.

===== Climate change =====
Zinke has shifted over time on the issue of climate change. In 2010, while in the Montana Senate, Zinke was one of nearly 1,200 state legislators who signed a letter to President Barack Obama and Congress calling for "comprehensive clean energy jobs and climate change legislation." Since 2010, however, he has repeatedly expressed doubt about anthropogenic climate change; in an October 2014 debate, Zinke said, "it's not a hoax, but it's not proven science either." During Senate confirmation hearings on his nomination as Interior Secretary, Zinke said that humans "influence" climate change, but did not acknowledge the scientific consensus that human activity is the dominant cause of climate change.

===== Transfers of federal lands to states =====
Zinke broke with most Republicans on the issue of transfers of federal lands to the states, calling such proposals "extreme" and voting against them. In July 2016, he withdrew as a delegate to the Republican National Convention in protest of the portion of the party's draft platform that would require that certain public lands be transferred to state control. Zinke said he endorsed "better management of federal land" rather than transfers.

==== Final committee assignments, 2017 ====
- Committee on Armed Services
- Committee on Natural Resources

=== Caucus memberships ===
- Congressional Western Caucus

== Secretary of the Interior (2017–2019) ==
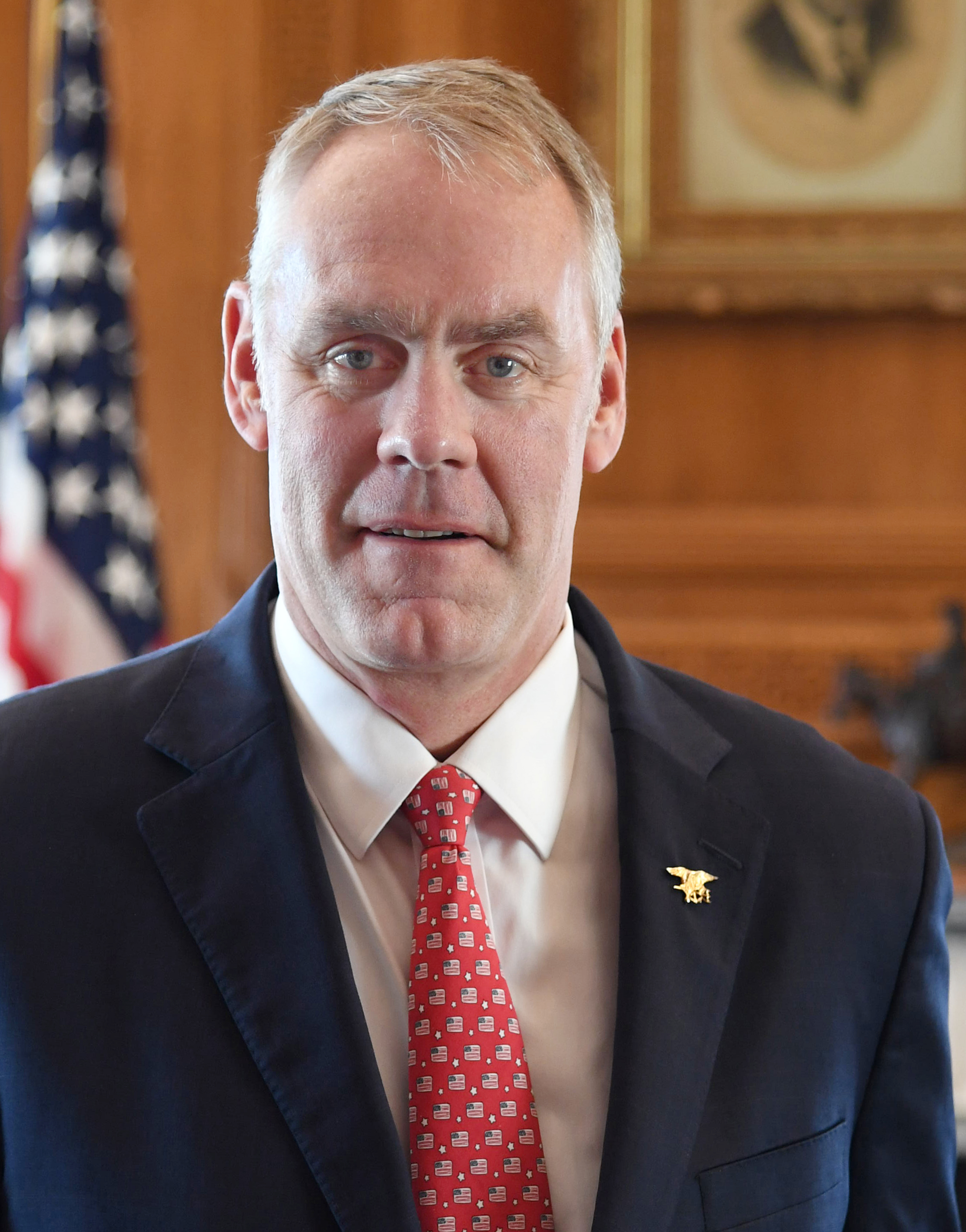
Zinke's official portrait as Secretary of the Interior, 2017

Zinke was named as President-elect Donald Trump's nominee for United States Secretary of the Interior on December 13, 2016, at the recommendation of Trump's son, Donald Trump Jr. The Senate Energy and Natural Resources Committee approved his nomination by a 16–6 vote on January 31, 2017, and he was confirmed by the full Senate by a 68–31 vote on March 1. Zinke had the support of both of Montana's senators, including Democrat Jon Tester. Zinke was sworn into office by Vice President Mike Pence the same day.

The day after his swearing-in, Zinke rode a United States Park Police horse named Tonto several blocks to the entrance of the Department of Interior's Main Interior Building to his official welcoming ceremony.

On May 24, 2017, in the Montana special election to fill Zinke's vacated House seat, Republican nominee Greg Gianforte defeated Democratic nominee Rob Quist, with 49.7% of the vote to Quist's 44.1%.

=== Rescinded ban on lead bullets ===
On his first full day in office, Zinke rescinded the policy implemented by outgoing Fish and Wildlife Service Director Daniel M. Ashe on January 19, 2017, the last day of the Obama administration, that banned the use of lead bullets and lead fishing tackle in national wildlife refuges. Zinke said in a statement:

"Over the past eight years … hunting, and recreation enthusiasts have seen trails closed and dramatic decreases in access to public lands across the board. It worries me to think about hunting and fishing becoming activities for the land-owning elite. This package of secretarial orders will expand access for outdoor enthusiasts and also make sure the community's voice is heard."

The regulation was meant to help prevent lead contamination of plants and animals.

The move was opposed by the Sierra Club, Center for Biological Diversity, and other environmental groups. The rollback was praised, however, by Senator Steve Daines, the National Rifle Association of America, and National Shooting Sports Foundation, as well as other "gun rights advocates, sportsmen's groups, conservatives and state wildlife agencies."

=== National Monument reductions ===
In April 2017, Zinke began reviewing at least 27 national monuments to determine whether any of them could be reduced in size. In June 2017, he recommended that Bears Ears National Monument's boundaries be scaled back. In August, he added the Grand Staircase–Escalante National Monument and Cascade-Siskiyou National Monument to the list of monuments to be shrunk, while also calling for new management rules for multiple national monuments to decrease the number of actions that are prohibited within the monuments.

In December 2017, Trump signed executive proclamations that reduced Bears Ears National Monument by 85% and Grand Staircase–Escalante National Monument by almost 46%. These moves prompted several legal challenges. A day later, Zinke issued a report recommending that Trump also shrink two more national monuments—Gold Butte National Monument in Nevada and Cascade–Siskiyou National Monument in Oregon. He also recommended changes to the management of six other national monuments. These changes were welcomed by Republicans such as Representative Rob Bishop, the chair of the House Natural Resources Committee, but condemned by Democrats and environmentalist groups such as the Natural Resources Defense Council and Sierra Club.

After The New York Times took Zinke's Interior Department to court, it won and got 25,000 documents, of which 4,500 pages were related to Zinke's multi-monument review, and which showed the administration set out to increase coal, oil and gas mining access. The documents also showed that the Zinke administration's new map largely matched a map previously promoted by longtime Utah Senator Orrin Hatch, whose plan claimed it "would resolve all known mineral conflicts for SITLA [Utah School and Institutional Trust Lands Administration] within the Bears Ears… the real [beneficiaries] are Utah schoolchildren and the people of San Juan County", a claim the Utah Diné Bikéyah tribe disputed as hypocritical.

=== Expenditure controversies ===
In September 2017, it was reported that on June 26, Zinke had chartered a jet belonging to an oil industry executive for a flight from Las Vegas to Kalispell, Montana. Zinke had been in Las Vegas to make an announcement related to public lands and to deliver a speech to the National Hockey League's Vegas Golden Knights, an expansion franchise owned by William P. Foley, a major donor to Zinke's congressional campaigns. The chartered flight cost taxpayers $12,375. Costs for commercial flights between Las Vegas and Kalispell typically start at $300. Upon arrival in Kalispell, Zinke spent the night at his private residence before delivering remarks at the annual meeting of the Western Governors Association the next morning. Zinke and his staffers returned to Washington on a commercial flight the next day.

Zinke used private aircraft and performed political duties in relation to an April 1 trip between St. Croix and St. Thomas in the U.S. Virgin Islands. Zinke had been in St. Croix on March 30 for an official meeting with Governor Kenneth Mapp during the day, and spent the night at a fundraiser for the Republican Party of the Virgin Islands, where attendees who pledged between $1,500 and $5,000 were allowed to have their pictures taken with Zinke. The next morning, he took a private flight costing the government $3,150 to St. Thomas to celebrate the centennial of the islands' handover to the United States by Denmark.

In December 2017, Politico reported that Zinke had booked government helicopters for more than $14,000 to travel in June and July 2017. One of these trips was the swearing-in ceremony of his successor in Congress; the Department of Interior defended the use of government helicopters instead of a two-hour car drive by saying Zinke would otherwise not be able to fully participate in the ceremony. An Interior spokesperson also told a Politico reporter asking about the expenses, "Shame on you for not respecting the office of a member of Congress." Another of these trips was the use of a Park Police helicopter to have a horseback ride with Vice President Mike Pence; the Interior Department justified the use of the helicopter over the three-hour car drive by saying, "the Secretary will be able to familiarize himself with the in-flight capabilities of an aircraft he is in charge of" and that Park Police staff would "provide an added measure of security to the Secretary during his travel." Zinke dismissed Politico's reporting as "total fabrications and a wild departure of reality" but did not identify any inaccuracies in the reporting.

==== Inspector general investigations and other inquiries ====
In October 2017, the Interior Department's Office of Inspector General (OIG) launched an investigation into Zinke's use of three charter flights during his tenure as Interior Secretary. In April 2018, OIG released its report, concluding that Zinke's chartered flight to give the June 2017 speech to the Las Vegas Golden Knights was authorized "without complete information" and that the speech was not official business because Zinke did not discuss the Interior Department or his role as Interior Secretary. OIG concluded that the two other charter flights, one to Alaska and the other to the U.S. Virgin Islands, "appeared to have been reasonable as related to official DOI business."

In October 2017, the United States Office of Special Counsel launched a Hatch Act investigation into Zinke's meeting with the Vegas Golden Knights.

In a March 2018 Senate Energy and Natural Resources Committee, Zinke said it was false that he had taken a private jet anywhere, noting that the charter flights he took were on aircraft with propellers, not jet engines.

As of October 30, 2018, the OIG had referred Zinke to the Department of Justice for investigation, including of whether he lied to the OIG about his involvement in reviewing a tribal casino project in Connecticut. The two Connecticut tribes claim that the Interior Department refused to sign off on the casino project after intense lobbying by MGM Resorts International and two Nevada Republican lawmakers. Zinke said the OIG interviewed him twice about the casino decision and that he was truthful both times. In late 2019, Deputy Attorney General Jeffrey Rosen stalled the probe into Zinke. Federal prosecutors had proposed to move forward with possible criminal charges against Zinke over his involvement in the casino deal. In doing so, Rosen also prevented the Interior Department's Office of Inspector General from making public a report about the casino deal.

=== Trophy hunting ===
In November 2017, it was announced that Trump, on Zinke's advice, wanted to lift the import ban on elephant and other big-game trophies from Zambia and Zimbabwe to the United States. A passionate hunter, Zinke justified himself to critics by saying that he had his best childhood memories of hunting with his father and that he was anxious to promote hunting for American families. Critics feared that lifting the import ban would trigger a wave of U.S. hunters, and that the decision would be a major blow to the survival of the elephant species. Two days later, Trump put his decision on hold, saying that he wanted to better inform himself on the issue.

In a memo dated March 1, 2018, the Fish and Wildlife Services, which operates under the Department of the Interior, declared that it would permit trophy hunting for elephants on a "case-by-case basis."

=== Greater sage-grouse ===
In 2017, Zinke took steps to unwind a 2015 plan that protected the greater sage-grouse. The Interior Department sought to change sage grouse habitat management plans in 10 states in a way that could open the sage-grouse habitat to mineral extraction and grazing. These proposals were welcomed by the oil and gas industry and condemned by environmentalists. In April 2021, a federal judge blocked this expansion of livestock grazing in Nevada across four hundred square miles (1,000 km^{2}) of some of the highest-priority sage-grouse habitat in the West.

=== Migratory Bird Treaty Act ===
Under Zinke, the Interior Department adopted a restrictive interpretation of the Migratory Bird Treaty Act, issuing a guidance document stating that the killing of birds "resulting from an activity is not prohibited by the Migratory Bird Treaty Act when the underlying purpose of that activity is not to take birds." The move was opposed by a bipartisan group of 17 former top Interior Department officials, including seven former heads of migratory bird management at the U.S. Fish and Wildlife Service, who served in every administration from Nixon to Obama. In a letter sent to Zinke and members of Congress, the former officials wrote, "This legal opinion is contrary to the long-standing interpretation by every administration (Republican and Democrat) since at least the 1970s."

=== Interior Department employees ===
In June 2017, Zinke called for the elimination of 4,000 jobs from the Interior Department and supported the White House proposal to cut the department's budget by 13.4%. The same month, he ordered 50 Interior members of the Senior Executive Service to be reassigned, "forcing many into jobs for which they had little experience and that were in different locations." The scope of the move was unusual. One reassigned Interior senior executive, scientist Joel Clement, published an op-ed in The Washington Post saying that the reassignment was retaliation against him "for speaking out publicly about the dangers that climate change poses to Alaska Native communities." The moves prompted the Interior Departments' Office of Inspector General to launch a probe.

In 2017, in a speech to the National Petroleum Council, Zinke said that one-third of Interior Department employees were disloyal to Trump and that "[he's] got 30 percent of the crew that's not loyal to the flag". His remarks prompted objections from the Coalition to Protect America's National Parks, Public Lands Foundation and Association of Retired Fish and Wildlife Service Employees (which called the comments "simply ludicrous, and deeply insulting") and Senator Maria Cantwell, the ranking member of the Senate Committee on Energy and Natural Resources (who said that Zinke had a "fundamental misunderstanding of the role" of the federal civil service).

=== Budget proposals ===
In 2018, as in 2017, Zinke proposed budget cuts to the Interior Department for fiscal year 2019, mostly from the Bureau of Land Management, U.S. Fish and Wildlife Service, and U.S. Geological Survey. His proposed budget would also have cut the Land and Water Conservation Fund to $8 million from $425 million in 2018.

=== 2018 wildfires ===
In August 2018, Zinke said that "environmental terrorist groups" were to blame for the wildfires in California, and that they had "nothing to do with climate change". Fire scientists and forestry experts rejected that claim, attributing the increasingly destructive wildfires to heat and drought caused by climate change. Later that month, Zinke walked back some of his earlier remarks, acknowledging that climate change played a part in the fires. He also said that preventing removal of dead trees has increased the amount of flammable material and hurt timber salvaging.

=== Calendar omissions ===
In October 2018, FOIA requests revealed that Zinke's calendar, which was supposed to cover the Secretary of the Interior's activities, contained glaring omissions. Zinke met with lobbyists and business executives on a number of occasions. Reporting from September 2018 noted that the calendars of his activities were "so vaguely described... that the public is unable tell what he was doing or with whom he was meeting."

=== Departure from office ===
On December 15, 2018, Trump announced that Zinke would leave "the Administration at the end of the year"; he later tweeted that he would name the new Secretary of the Interior the following week. According to The Washington Post, Zinke had submitted his resignation the same morning. Zinke himself later posted a statement on Twitter, saying, "I cannot justify spending thousands of dollars defending myself and my family against false allegations…It is better for the President and Interior to focus on accomplishments rather than fictitious allegations." His resignation came just a week after former White House Chief of Staff John Kelly's departure was announced.

Donald J. Trump
(@realDonaldTrump)
tweeted:

Secretary of the Interior @RyanZinke will be leaving the Administration at the end of the year after having served for a period of almost two years. Ryan has accomplished much during his tenure and I want to thank him for his service to our Nation.......

December 15, 2018

Zinke was facing several federal probes, including the "Montana land deal" in which a foundation owned by Zinke and the chairman of energy firm Halliburton, David Lesar, were accused of wrongdoing in relation to a development project in Zinke's home town of Whitefish, Montana. The Department of Justice was also investigating his use of personal email.

In May 2020, Zinke criticized the investigations that led to his departure, saying they were politicized and that such investigations would result in only billionaires being able to afford to serve in a public office.

== Return to U.S. House of Representatives (2023–present) ==
=== Elections ===
==== 2022 congressional election ====
In June 2021, Zinke announced his candidacy to return to the U.S. House of Representatives, this time in Montana's 1st congressional district, which was reconstituted after the 2020 census. (Note: Montana had been split between two districts from 1919 to 1993, but for the next three decades had been represented by a single member.) He defeated Democratic nominee Monica Tranel in the general election.

==== 2024 congressional election ====
In 2024, Zinke defeated Democratic nominee Monica Tranel in the general election again with 52% of the vote to Tranel's 45%.

=== Tenure ===
In 2023, Zinke voted against House Concurrent Resolution 21, which directed President Joe Biden to remove U.S. troops from Syria within 180 days.

During the Gaza war, Zinke introduced legislation that would prohibit individuals who held passports from the Palestinian Authority from entering or seeking refuge in the US. On his congressional website, Zinke touted the proposed bill as legislation aiming to "Expel Palestinians from the United States".

In June 2025, Zinke expressed opposition to the Senate's version of the One Big Beautiful Bill Act over concerns of the proposed sale of over 1.2 million acres of public lands.

In March 2026, Zinke announced that he would not run for re-election in that year's congressional election, citing health issues.

In September 2026, Zinke introduced the A River Runs Through it Act, which designates the uses of approximately 430,000 acres of federal lands in the Blackfoot River (Montana) Valley, including a 132,000 acre expansion of the Scapegoat Wilderness and Bob Marshall Wilderness complex.

== Personal life ==
Zinke married Lolita Hand on August 8, 1992. Both had been married before; Hand's first husband was killed in an automobile accident, leaving her a widow with a young daughter. Zinke's first marriage ended in divorce circa 1991. He has three children from his first marriage: sons Wolfgang and Konrad, and daughter Jennifer. He and Hand have two children together. Zinke was formerly Missouri Synod Lutheran. He is now Catholic.

Zinke splits his time among Washington, D.C.; Whitefish, Montana, his hometown; and Santa Barbara, California, his wife's hometown. In 2021, Politico reported that he no longer resided at his Whitefish house and spent more time in Santa Barbara.

== Awards and decorations ==
U.S. military decorations
Bronze Star with gold award star
Defense Meritorious Service Medal with bronze oak leaf cluster
Meritorious Service Medal with four gold award star
Joint Service Commendation Medal with bronze oak leaf cluster
Army Commendation Medal
Navy and Marine Corps Commendation Medal with gold award star
Navy and Marine Corps Achievement Medal with two gold award stars
Combat Action Ribbon
Joint Meritorious Unit Award
Navy Meritorious Unit Commendation
National Defense Service Medal with bronze service star
Armed Forces Expeditionary Medal
Kosovo Campaign Medal
Global War on Terrorism Expeditionary Medal
Iraq Campaign Medal with bronze service star
Armed Forces Service Medal
Humanitarian Service Medal
Navy Sea Service Deployment Ribbon with three bronze service stars
Navy and Marine Corps Overseas Service Ribbon
NATO Medal for Former Yugoslavia
Navy Expert Rifleman Medal
Navy Expert Pistol Shot Medal

U.S. badges, patches and tabs
Naval Special Warfare insignia
Navy and Marine Corps Parachutist Insignia

== Electoral history ==
2008 Republican Primary for 2nd District of Montana Senate
Party	Candidate	Votes	%
Republican	Ryan Zinke	1,452	69.37
Republican	Suzanne Brooks	641	30.63
Total votes		2,093	100%

2008 Election for 2nd District of Montana Senate
Party	Candidate	Votes	%
Republican	Ryan Zinke	5,498	54.60
Democratic	Brittany MacLean	4,571	45.40
Total votes		10,069	100%

2014 Republican Primary for U.S. Representative of Montana's At-Large Congressional District
Party	Candidate	Votes	%
Republican	Ryan Zinke	43,766	33.25
Republican	Corey Stapleton	38,591	29.32
Republican	Matt Rosendale	37,965	28.84
Republican	Elsie Arntzen	9,011	6.85
Republican	Drew Turiano	2,290	1.74
Total votes		131,623	100

2014 Election for U.S. Representative of Montana's At-Large Congressional District
Party	Candidate	Votes	%
Republican	Ryan Zinke	203,871	55.41
Democratic	John Lewis	148,690	40.41
Libertarian	Mike Fellows	15,402	4.19
Total votes		367,963	100%

2016 Republican Primary for U.S. Representative of Montana's At-Large Congressional District
Party	Candidate	Votes	%
Republican	Ryan Zinke (incumbent)	144,660	100.0
Total votes		144,660	100.0

2016 Election for U.S. Representative of Montana's At-Large Congressional District
Party	Candidate	Votes	%
Republican	Ryan Zinke (incumbent)	285,358	56.19
Democratic	Denise Juneau	205,919	40.55
Libertarian	Rick Breckenridge	16,554	3.26
Total votes		507,831	100%

2022 Republican Primary for U.S. Representative of Montana's 1st Congressional District
Party	Candidate	Votes	%
Republican	Ryan Zinke	35,601	41.7
Republican	Albert Olszewski	33,927	39.7
Republican	Mary Todd	8,915	10.4
Republican	Matthew Jette	4,973	5.8
Republican	Mitch Heuer	1,953	2.3
Total votes		85,369	100.0

2022 Election for U.S. Representative of Montana's 1st Congressional District
Party	Candidate	Votes	%
Republican	Ryan Zinke	123,102	49.65
Democratic	Monica Tranel	115,265	46.49
Libertarian	John Lamb	9,593	3.87
Total votes		247,960	100%

2024 Republican Primary for U.S. Representative of Montana's 1st Congressional District
Party	Candidate	Votes	%
Republican	Ryan Zinke (incumbent)	66,409	73.74
Republican	Mary Todd	23,647	26.26
Total votes		90,056	100.0

2024 Election for U.S. Representative of Montana's 1st Congressional District
Party	Candidate	Votes	%
Republican	Ryan Zinke (incumbent)	168,529	52.3
Democratic	Monica Tranel	143,783	44.62
Libertarian	Dennis Hayes	9,954	3.09
Total votes		322,226	100.0

== See also ==
- 2018 United States Senate election in Montana
- Environmental policy of the first Trump administration
- List of Department of the Interior appointments by Donald Trump
- List of United States representatives in the 115th Congress
- List of Montana state senators
- List of United States Navy SEALs
- Whitefish Energy

U.S. House of Representatives
Preceded by Steve Daines	Member of the U.S. House of Representatives from Montana's at-large congressional district 2015–2017	Succeeded by Greg Gianforte
Constituency reestablished	Member of the U.S. House of Representatives from Montana's 1st congressional district 2023–present	Incumbent
Political offices
Preceded by Sally Jewell	United States Secretary of the Interior; 2017–2019	Succeeded by David Bernhardt
U.S. order of precedence (ceremonial)
Preceded by Claudia Tenney	United States representatives by seniority 238th	Succeeded by Marlin Stutzman
