= Sally Jewell =

51st United States Secretary of the Interior

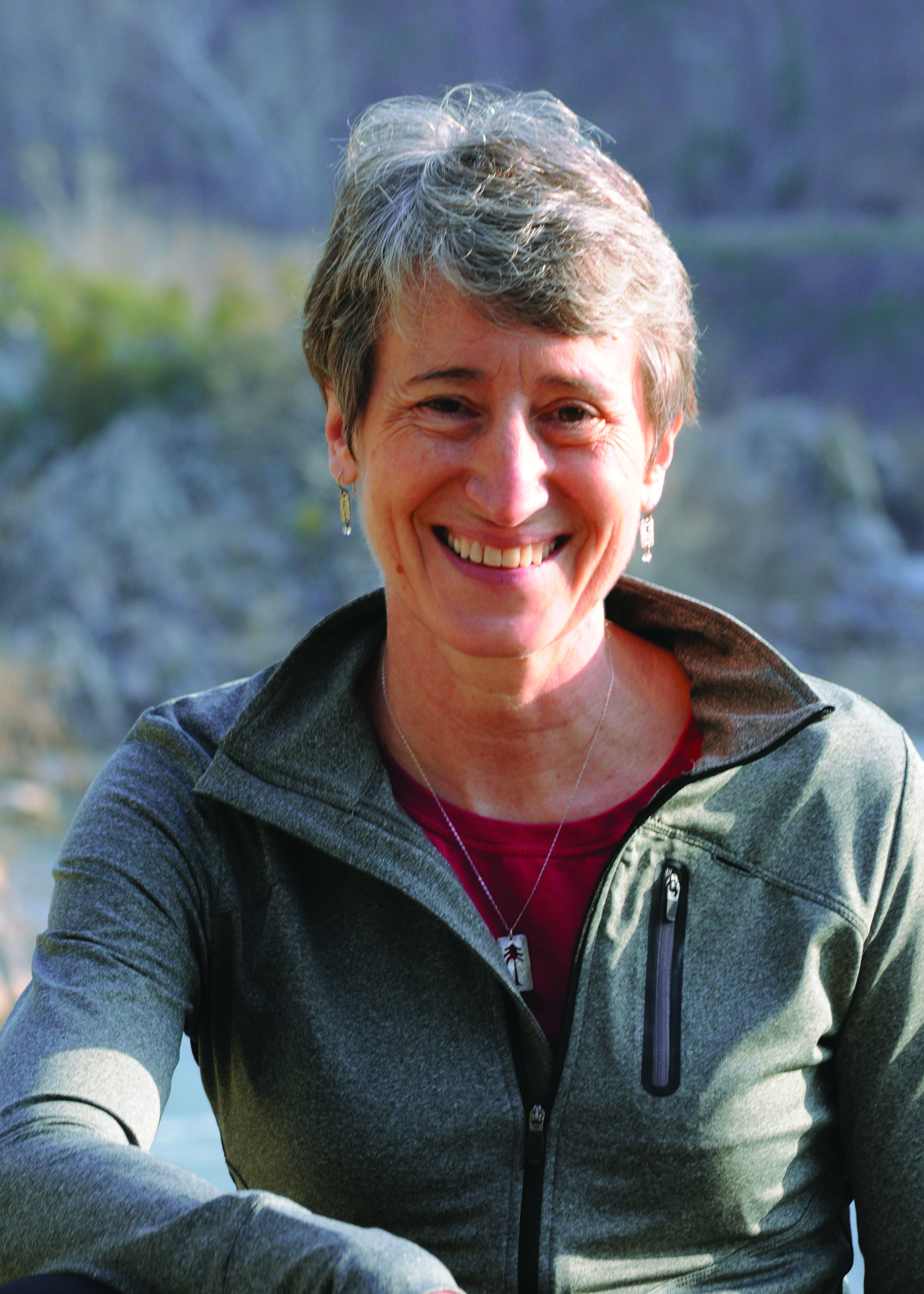
- Jewell in 2013

51st United States Secretary of the Interior
- In office April 12, 2013 – January 20, 2017
- President: Barack Obama
- Deputy: David J. Hayes; Michael L. Connor
- Preceded by: Ken Salazar
- Succeeded by: Ryan Zinke

Personal details
- Born: Sarah Margaret Roffey; February 21, 1956 (age 70) London, England, UK
- Party: Democratic
- Spouse: Warren Jewell
- Children: 2
- Education: University of Washington (BS)
- Jewell's voice Jewell on repatriation of Native American cultural heritage. Recorded October 25, 2016

Sarah Margaret "Sally" Roffey Jewell (née Roffey; born February 21, 1956) is a British-American business executive and environmentalist who served as the 51st United States secretary of the interior in the Obama administration from 2013 to 2017.

Jewell was born in London and moved to the United States at age three. She grew up in the State of Washington and attended the University of Washington. After college, Jewell briefly worked as an oil engineer before transitioning to the banking industry. A position on the board of Recreational Equipment, Inc. (REI), a Seattle-based retailer of outdoor gear, in 1996, eventually led to her becoming the company's chief operating officer, from 2000 to 2005, and then chief executive officer from 2005 to 2013.

Jewell is a lifelong outdoors enthusiast and while at REI became known for her involvement in conservation and environmental protection. These efforts brought her to the attention of the Obama administration, and she was nominated as Secretary of the Interior to succeed Ken Salazar in 2013. Her nomination received substantial bipartisan support and she was handily confirmed by the Senate in April 2013. Jewell is the second woman to hold the position of Secretary of the Interior, after Gale Norton.

== Early life and education ==
Sarah Margaret Roffey was born in London, England, the daughter of Anne (née Murphy) and Peter Roffey. She was three when her family moved to the United States in 1959; her father, an anesthesiologist, took up a fellowship at the University of Washington. Her mother was a nurse practitioner whose specialty was women's health. The Roffey family, including Sally and her three siblings, enjoyed the outdoors, and Sally went sailing and hiking from a young age. A two-week camping trip to teach children ecology inspired her love of the outdoors when she was nine years old. She attended Seattle Country Day School during her elementary years, and in 1973 graduated from Renton High School.

Roffey attended the University of Washington, first planning to become a dental hygienist. She switched to pre-dental at the encouragement of a roommate. After Roffey started dating an engineering student, Warren Jewell, she discovered an aptitude for engineering and changed her major. As an engineering student she worked for General Electric on components for the Alaska Pipeline. In 1978, she received her degree in mechanical engineering from the University of Washington.

Soon after graduation, Roffey married Jewell. The couple moved to Oklahoma, both having accepted engineering jobs with Mobil.

== Career ==
=== Early career ===
Sally Jewell worked for Mobil oil company on oil fields in Oklahoma from 1978 through 1981, when she joined Rainier Bank and returned to the Pacific Northwest. Jewell's background was attractive to Rainier Bank, which was considering gas and oil investments and wanted industry engineers to help evaluate possible assets. Jewell advised against investments in oil and gas, and the bank's adoption of this recommendation was good for their business. She stayed with Security Pacific after it acquired Rainier Bank, until 1992. Jewell worked for WestOne Bank from 1992 through 1995, and for Washington Mutual from 1995 through 2000. In total, she worked for nearly 20 years in the banking industry.

In 1996, Jewell joined the board of Recreational Equipment Inc. (REI). In 2000 she was named chief operating officer. REI is a retailer of outdoor gear that operates as a member-owned cooperative.

In 2005, she succeeded Dennis Madsen as chief executive officer (CEO). In 2006 Jewell was named Puget Sound Business Journal CEO of the Year. By 2012, Jewell noted that the REI co-op had facilitated 3 million hours of volunteer work in parks and other natural outdoor spaces and spent three percent of its annual profits on outdoor stewardship. During her tenure at REI, annual sales grew from $600 million in 2005 to more than $2 billion in 2015, and the company doubled the number of its retail stores. Jewell remained CEO of REI until she was named Secretary of the Interior in 2013.

=== Civic involvement and awards ===
While working in the private sector, Jewell became known for her involvement in conservation and environmental protection efforts. Jewell has sat on the boards of Premera, the National Parks Conservation Association, the University of Washington Board of Regents (2001–2013), and the Retail Industry Leaders Association. She helped found the Mountains to Sound Greenway Trust and served as a board member and president of the group. She started making campaign contributions in 2008, giving almost "solely to Democratic candidates" according to USA Today.

In 2009, Jewell received the National Audubon Society's Rachel Carson Award for her leadership in, and dedication to, conservation. She was also named a 2012 Woman of Distinction from the Girl Scouts of Western Washington, and that same year was awarded the Woodrow Wilson Center's Award for Public Service. That same year, the Mountains to Sound Greenway Trust named Jewell to its hall of fame for 21 years of leadership with Greenway Trust, encouraging people to participate in outdoor activities. The University of Washington honored Jewell with its 2016 Alumni Lifetime Achievement Award. In 2017, the Teton Science Schools, a Wyoming-based non-profit, awarded her the Murie Spirit of Conservation Award recognizing a lifetime achievement in conservation through civil discourse.

=== Secretary of the Interior ===
On February 6, 2013, Jewell was nominated by President Barack Obama to succeed Ken Salazar as United States Secretary of the Interior. Her nomination was approved by the United States Senate Committee on Energy and Natural Resources on March 21, with only three of the committee's 22 members opposed. On April 10, 2013, the Senate confirmed Jewell to be Secretary of the Interior in an 87–11 vote. She was sworn in as Secretary of the Interior on April 12, 2013. As Secretary of the Interior she oversaw the Interior Department, which has a budget of $11 billion, employs 70,000 people, and acted as steward for twenty percent of the United States of America's land.

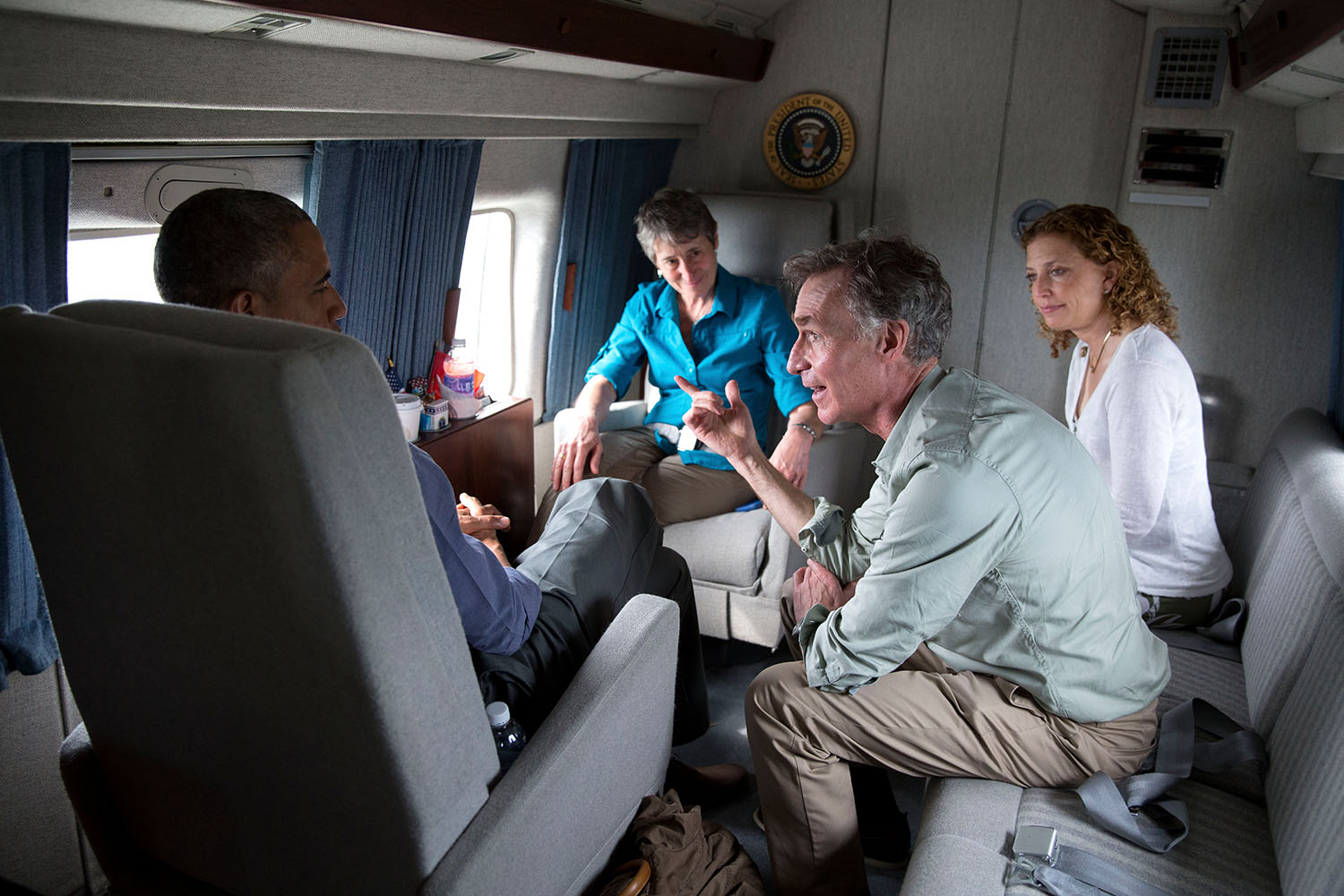
Jewell (center) aboard Marine One with (left to right) President Barack Obama, Bill Nye, and Rep. Debbie Wasserman Schultz for Earth Day, April 22, 2015

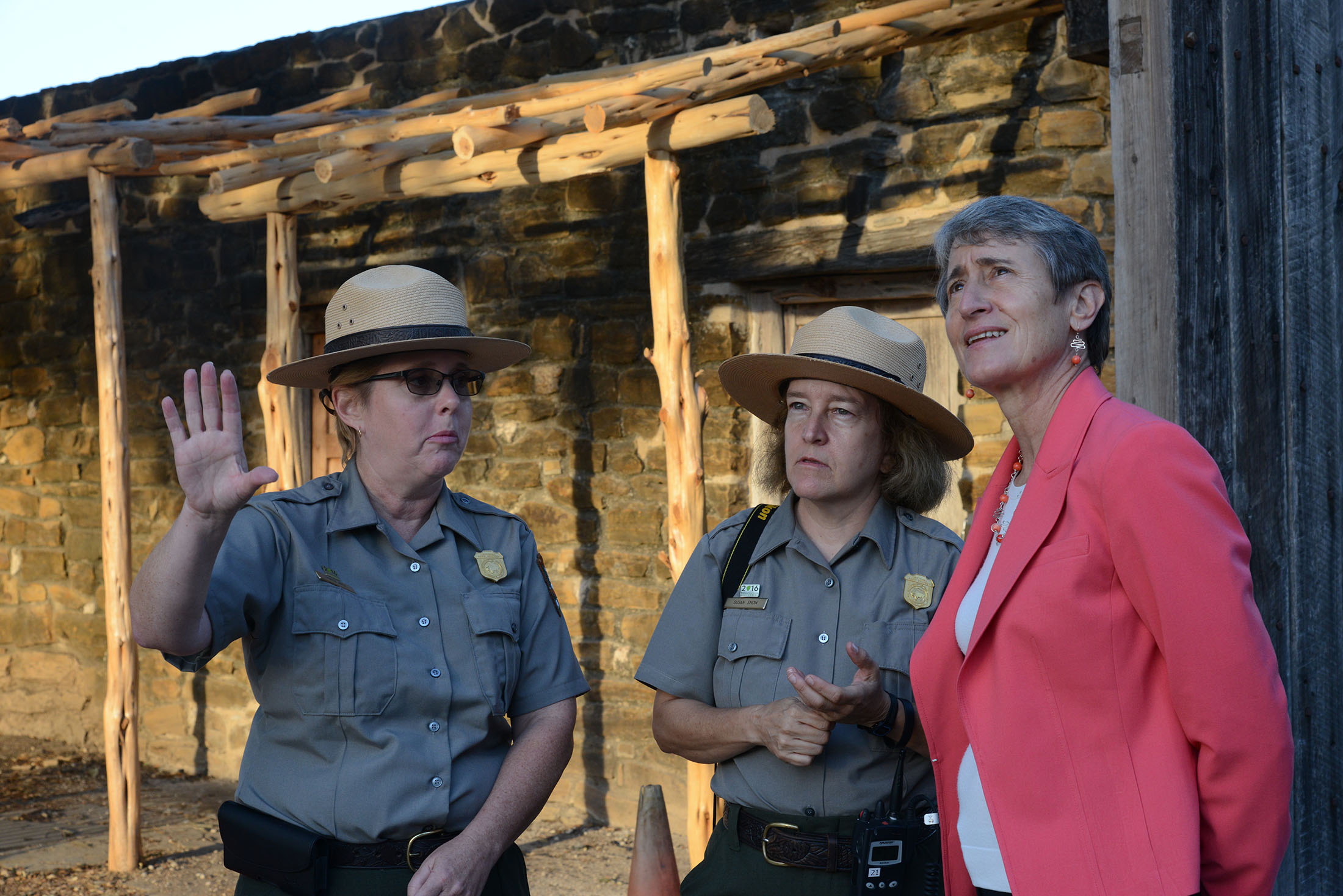
Sally Jewell at Mission San Jose

Jewell's first order as secretary, issued in October 2013, established a process for the Department of the Interior to offset large development projects with conservation efforts. The effort was an extension of existing programs that use fees for offshore drilling permits to expand or build parks. At the same time, Jewell publicly pledged to work with President Obama to preserve mountains and rivers, with or without Congressional action. Existing laws, such as the 1906 Antiquities Act, give the president broad authority to preserve land, a power Jewell indicated she and the President were prepared to use as part of a balanced approach between development and conservation.

Expanding access to parks was a feature of many initiatives Jewell undertook as secretary. A 2014 Secretarial Order set benchmarks to increase youth involvement, seeking to create opportunities for young people to play, learn, serve, and work in national parks. Jewell led the kickoff of the Every Kid Every Park program by leading fourth graders on a hike through Red Rock Canyon National Conservation Area. The Every Kid initiative made every fourth grade student, and their families, eligible for a free one-year pass to every national park. Jewell also backed a 2016 initiative to expedite permitting for youth organizations to explore public wildlands on overnight or multi-day trips, particularly in less popular parks.

On August 28, 2015, Jewell used her authority as Secretary to rename the tallest mountain in North America Denali. The United States federal government had adopted the name Mount McKinley for the peak in 1917 although the Koyukon Athabascan, a group native to Alaska, had traditionally called the peak Denali. President Obama supported Jewell's decision to change the name.

As Secretary, Jewell approved the first phase of the Desert Renewable Energy Conservation Plan (DRECP). The DRECP focuses on renewable energy and land conservation in California's desert. At the signing ceremony, held September 16, 2016, at the Santa Rosa & San Jacinto Mountains National Monument Visitor Center, Secretary Jewell stated phase one was intended to streamline approval for solar, wind, and geothermal projects. The DRECP also aimed to preserve 4.2 million acres of land. Conservation groups viewed the initiative more favorably than did wind and solar developers, who criticized the DRECP for removing some public land designated for development.

Jewell was the 51st Secretary of the Interior, and the second woman to hold the position. Unlike many of her predecessors, Jewell never held elected office. Because she acquired her U.S. citizenship by naturalization rather than being a natural-born citizen, Jewell was not eligible to hold a place within the presidential line of succession.

=== Post-secretaryship ===
After leaving government, Jewell returned to Seattle and the University of Washington as an advisor to the College of the Environment's EarthLab, which coordinates solutions to climate change and environmental issues. She also joined the boards of The Nature Conservancy and Bellevue-based life insurance company Symetra. Jewell served as the interim CEO of The Nature Conservancy from September 3, 2019 to May 18, 2020. In January 2020, she joined the board of Costco.

In 2015, Jewell was selected as the ship's sponsor for USS Montana (SSN-794). She christened the vessel 12 September 2020 at Huntington Ingalls Industries Newport News Shipbuilding amid a virtual ceremony because of restrictions due to COVID.

== Personal life ==
Jewell is married to Warren Jewell, also an engineer. They have two adult children: a son, who works as a pediatric intensive care nurse, and a daughter, who works as a revenue agent for the federal government. Both resided in Seattle as of 2013.

In her spare time, Jewell is an outdoor enthusiast and enjoys snowboarding, kayaking and mountain climbing. She has climbed Vinson Massif, the highest mountain in Antarctica, Mont Blanc, Western Europe's highest mountain, and has scaled Mount Rainier seven times.

== See also ==
- List of female United States Cabinet members
- List of foreign-born United States Cabinet members

Political offices
Preceded by Ken Salazar	United States Secretary of the Interior; 2013–2017	Succeeded by Ryan Zinke
U.S. order of precedence (ceremonial)
Preceded by Jack Lew as Former U.S. Cabinet Member	Order of precedence of the United States as Former U.S. Cabinet Member	Succeeded by Ernest Moniz as Former U.S. Cabinet Member
