= Elizabeth Klein =

American lawyer

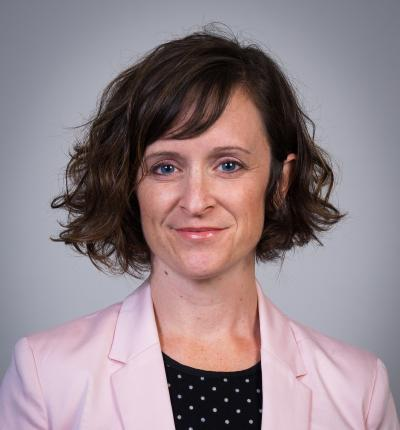

Director of the Bureau of Ocean Energy Management
- In office January 19, 2023 – January 20, 2025
- President: Joe Biden
- Secretary: Deb Haaland
- Preceded by: Amanda Lefton
- Succeeded by: TBD

Personal details
- Education: George Washington University; American University Washington College of Law

Elizabeth Johnson Klein is an American lawyer who served as the director of the Bureau of Ocean Energy Management from 2023 to 2025. She was previously a senior counselor to the United States secretary of the interior with an emphasis was on water policy and climate change resilience.

== Education ==
Klein earned a bachelor's degree, summa cum laude, in economics at George Washington University. She completed a J.D., summa cum laude, from American University Washington College of Law (WCL). Klein was president of the WCL environmental law society. She is a member of the Order of the Coif.

== Career ==
Klein first served in the United States Department of the Interior (DOI) in 1999. Under secretaries Ken Salazar and Sally Jewell, Klein served as the DOI associate deputy secretary as well as principal deputy assistant secretary in the Office of Policy, Management and Budget. She was an architect of the Obama administration's work to create a new offshore wind industry and leasing program. Following the election of president Donald Trump in 2016, Klein served as the deputy director of the state energy and environmental impact center at New York University School of Law. In this role, she supported state Attorneys General addressing clean energy, climate, and environmental initiatives of regional and national importance.

On January 18, 2021, U.S. president-elect Joe Biden announced Klein as his nominee for United States Deputy Secretary of the Interior. U.S. senator Lisa Murkowski came out against Klein's nomination citing her opposition to the development of the oil and gas industry in Alaska. Because of this, the Biden administration withdrew Klein's nomination. Tommy Beaudreau would later fill the role. On January 20, 2021, Klein rejoined the DOI as a senior counselor to Deb Haaland, the United States secretary of the interior. Her emphasis was on water policy and climate change resilience. In this role, she also served as chair of the Indian Water Rights Working Group, which manages, negotiates and implements settlements of water rights claims.

On January 19, 2023, Klein succeeded Amanda Lefton as the director of the Bureau of Ocean Energy Management.
