= David J. Hayes =

American government official (born 1953)

David Hayes
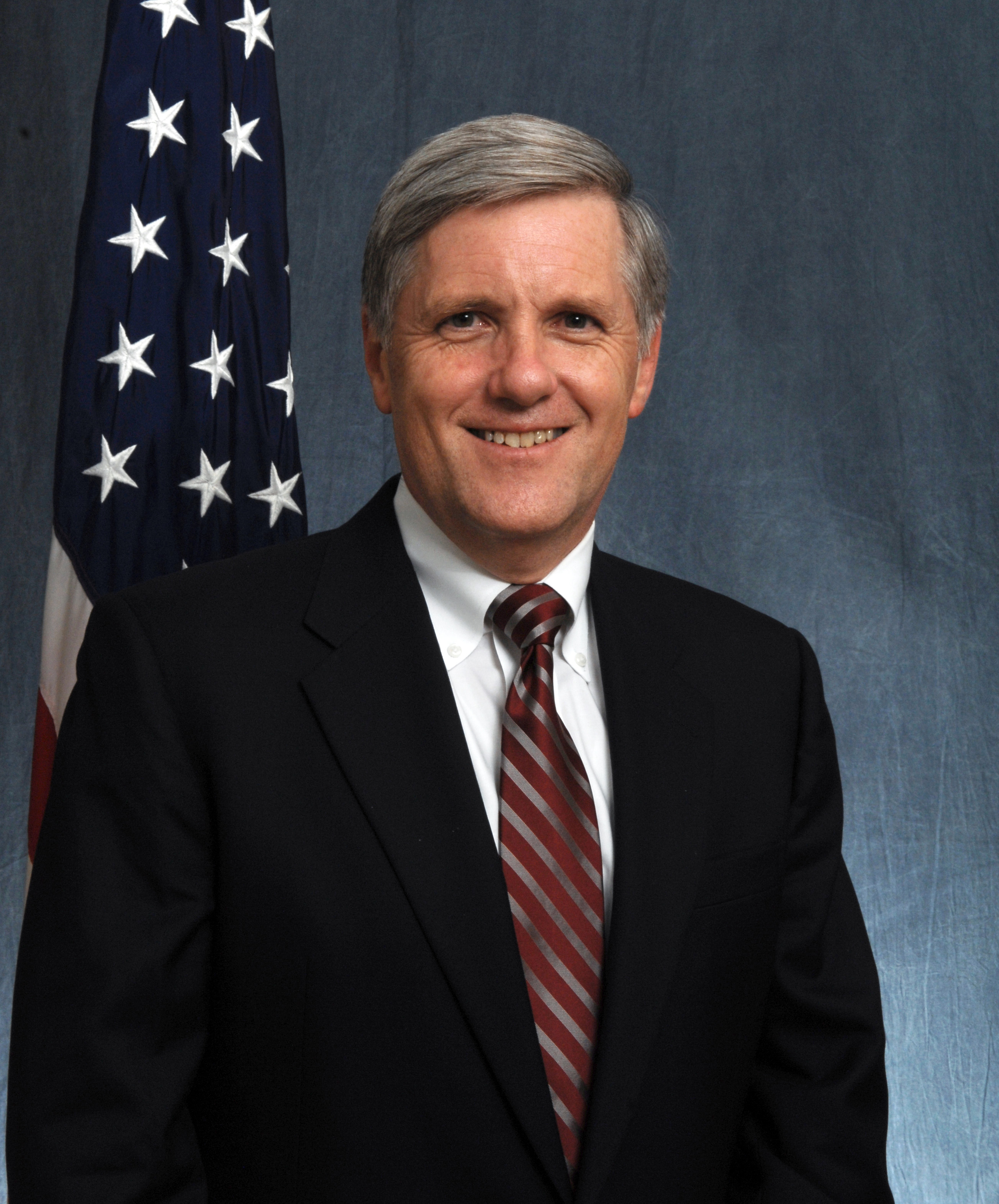

2nd and 5th United States Deputy Secretary of the Interior
- In office May 22, 2009 – June 30, 2013
- President: Barack Obama
- Preceded by: Lynn Scarlett
- Succeeded by: Michael L. Connor
- In office January 3, 1999 – January 20, 2001
- President: Bill Clinton
- Preceded by: John Garamendi
- Succeeded by: J. Steven Griles

Personal details
- Born: 1953 (age 72–73) Rochester, New York, U.S.
- Party: Democratic
- Education: University of Notre Dame (BA); Stanford University (JD)

David J. Hayes (born 1953) is an American attorney and legal scholar who served as Special Assistant to the President for Climate Policy during the Biden administration. During his tenure, Hayes led White House work on clean energy deployment issues (including offshore wind, onshore renewable energy, and transmission siting and permitting), climate resilience (including establishing new interagency structures, funding, data and mapping tools to address cross-cutting resilience issues) and greenhouse gas emission reduction and carbon sequestration initiatives. Hayes also assisted in developing and implementing the climate-related provisions included in the Infrastructure Investment and Jobs Act and the Inflation Reduction Act.

Hayes served as Deputy Secretary of the United States Department of the Interior during the Obama and Clinton administrations.

== Early life and education ==
Hayes was born in Rochester, New York. He earned a Bachelor of Arts degree from the University of Notre Dame in 1975 and a Juris Doctor from Stanford Law School in 1978.

== Career ==
=== U.S. Department of the Interior ===
Hayes served as counselor to Interior Secretary Bruce Babbitt, and then as the Senate-confirmed Deputy Secretary of the Interior, during the Clinton Administration (1997–2001). Before and between his service in the Clinton and Obama administrations, Hayes practiced environmental and energy law as Global Chairman of the Environment, Land and Resources department at the firm of Latham & Watkins (1990–1997; 2001–2008). He was a Senior Fellow at the Hewlett Foundation from 2013 to 2014, and he previously served as a Senior Fellow of the World Wildlife Fund, and as a senior fellow at the Progressive Policy Institute (the think tank affiliated with the Democratic Leadership Council).

Prior to his appointment as Deputy Secretary, Hayes headed up energy and the environment agency review for President-elect Obama's Transition Team, with responsibility over the Departments of Agriculture, Interior, Energy and the EPA. He was a lead environmental and energy advisor to the Kerry campaign in 2004; acted as special emissary for Vice President Gore to advise the new president of Bolivia on sustainable development issues in 1993 and 1994; and served on the EPA Transition Team for President-elect Clinton in 1992.

During Hayes' first tenure as Deputy Secretary of the Interior, he focused on environmental priorities, including the acquisition and protection of threatened lands (e.g., the Headwaters old-growth redwood forest in Northern California); the restoration of threatened ecosystems (e.g. the Bay-Delta ecosystem restoration project in California); the introduction of modern water management approaches in the west (e.g. the Colorado River initiatives undertaken by the Clinton administration); the negotiation of habitat conservation plans under the Endangered Species Act; energy-related issues associated with federal lands and resources (e.g. oil and gas development, hydropower licensing, etc.); and the settlement of long-standing Indian water and land disputes.

From 2009 to July 2013, he was the Deputy Secretary and CEO of the United States Department of the Interior in the Obama administration. His nomination was confirmed by unanimous consent on May 20, 2009 by the United States Senate and he took office on May 22, 2009. Hayes’ confirmation was delayed, and subject to a cloture vote, based on then-Senator Bob Bennett’s objections to Secretary Salazar's cancellation of an oil and gas lease sale in Utah. During his tenure as Deputy Secretary, Hayes facilitated the development of major renewable energy projects by helping to institute permitting reforms and introducing landscape-scale planning for solar projects on public lands and wind projects in offshore waters. He oversaw the establishment of a network of climate science and regional cooperatives to address climate change impacts on resources; managed the day-to-day response to the Gulf Oil spill; negotiated a resolution of the Cobell Indian trust fund litigation and oversaw the settlement of several Indian water rights settlements; and was the point person for the Administration on water issues in California and energy issues in Alaska. After helping to develop the Administration's response to the African wildlife trafficking crisis, the President appointed Hayes to the White House Advisory Council on Wildlife Trafficking.

Hayes served in Biden administration as Special Assistant to the President for Climate Policy from January, 2021 until October, 2022.

=== Non-profit work ===
Active in the non-profit field, Hayes is the former chairman of the board of the non-partisan Environmental Law Institute. He also served as the vice-chairman of the national conservation group, American Rivers, and was a board member of RESOLVE, a non-profit that focuses on problem-solving in the energy and environmental fields. Hayes is a currently a member of the board of directors for the Coalition for Green Capital and the Advisory Council of Stanford's Bill Lane Center for the American West.

=== Academics ===
During the 2007–2008 academic year, Hayes was a consulting professor at Stanford University's Woods Institute for the Environment, where he undertook a special project analyzing the regulatory challenges associated with carbon offsets. His report was published by the Center for American Progress. He is the author of dozens of journal articles on issues related to energy and the environment.

Prior to leading the State Impact Center, he was a Distinguished Visiting Lecturer at Law at Stanford Law School and affiliated with Stanford's Woods Institute for the Environment and Precourt Institute for Energy. As a Visiting Lecturer at Stanford, Hayes has developed and taught courses focused on renewable and conventional energy development and regulation, international wildlife trafficking, NEPA reform, and the Arctic. He has published several articles relating to this work.

He served as chairman of the Board of Visitors for the Stanford Law School.

From August 2017 through January 2021, Hayes was the executive director at the State Energy & Environmental Impact Center at NYU School of Law.

== Personal life ==
Hayes lives in Arlington, Virginia, with his wife Elizabeth Haile Hayes. They have three children.

Political offices
Preceded by Lynn Scarlett	United States Deputy Secretary of the Interior; 2009–2013	Succeeded by Michael L. Connor
