= Michael L. Connor =

American lawyer, politician and engineer (born 1963)

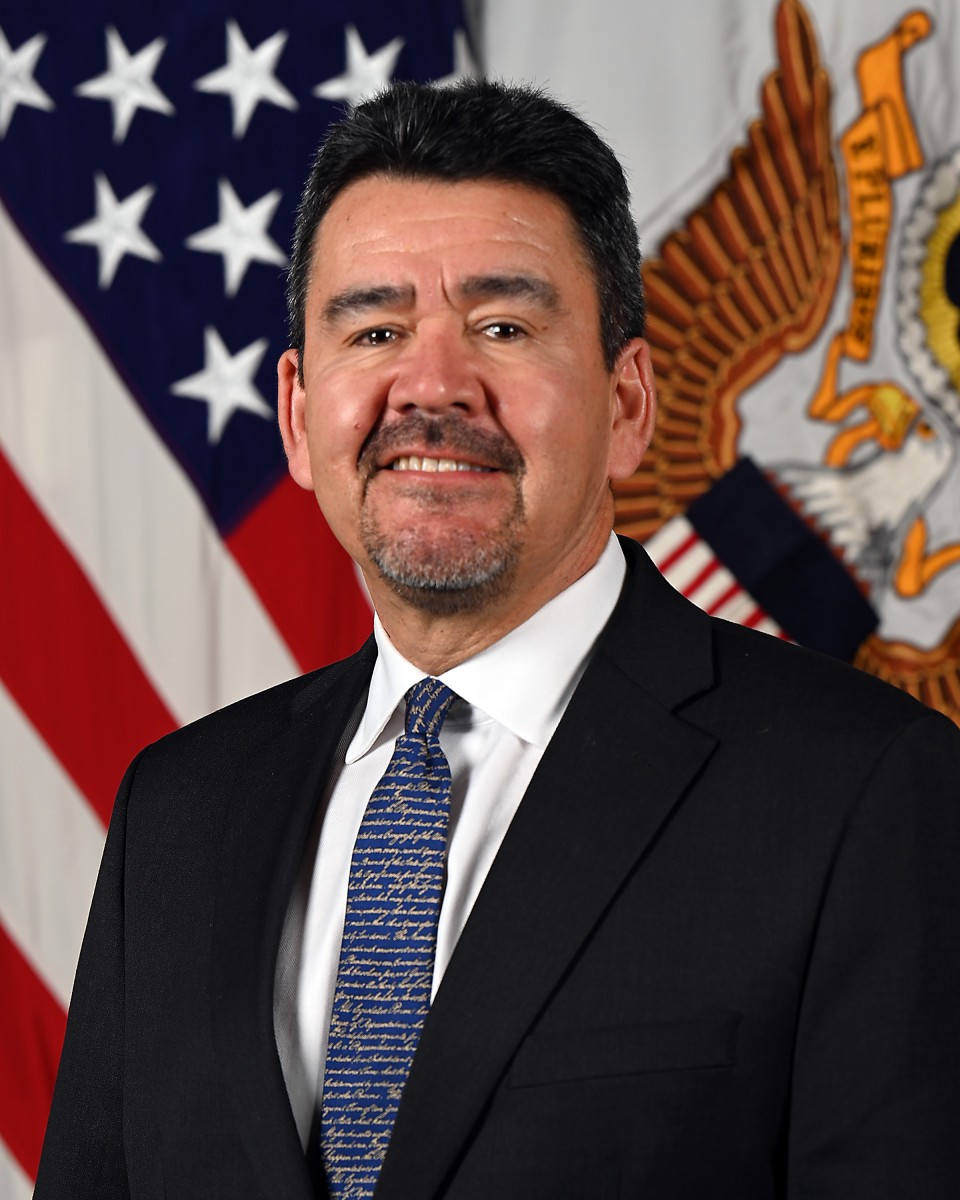

United States Assistant Secretary of the Army for Civil Works
- In office November 29, 2021 – January 20, 2025
- President: Joe Biden
- Preceded by: R.D. James
- Succeeded by: Adam Telle

6th United States Deputy Secretary of the Interior
- In office February 27, 2014 – January 20, 2017
- President: Barack Obama
- Preceded by: David J. Hayes
- Succeeded by: David Bernhardt

Personal details
- Born: August 21, 1963 (age 63) Las Cruces, New Mexico, U.S.
- Party: Democratic
- Spouse: Shari Hanson
- Children: 2
- Education: New Mexico State University (BS); University of Colorado, Boulder (JD)
- Occupation: Politician; lawyer; engineer
- Nickname: Mike
- Michael L. Connor's voice Connor's opening statement at a House Appropriations Energy and Water Development Subcommittee hearing on the FY2023 Army Corps of Engineers budget request Recorded April 27, 2022

Michael Lee Connor is an American politician, lawyer and engineer who served as United States Assistant Secretary of the Army for Civil Works from 2021 to 2025. He was previously United States Deputy Secretary of the Interior from 2014 to 2017, among other positions in United States Department of the Interior.

== Early life and education ==
Born in Las Cruces, New Mexico, he spent his childhood in New Mexico. He is an enrolled member of Taos Pueblo. His maternal grandfather was a leader within the Taos Pueblo community and was an original member of Taos Pueblo's water rights task force. Connor received a Bachelor of Science in chemical engineering from New Mexico State University in 1986. He then received his Juris Doctor from the University of Colorado Law School, and is admitted to the bars of Colorado and New Mexico.

== Career ==
=== First DOI positions ===
From 1986 to 1990 he worked as a professional engineer for General Electric. He was a research assistant in the Natural Resources Law Center at the University of Colorado from 1991 to 1993. He was then employed with the Interior Solicitor's Office in Washington, DC and in Albuquerque, New Mexico. He began his Department of the Interior career in the Solicitor's Honors Program in 1993. During the Clinton Administration from 1993 to 2001, Connor served in the Department of the Interior, including as Deputy Director from 1998 to 1999 and then Director of the Secretary's Indian Water Rights Office from 1998 to 2001. While serving in this capacity he represented the Secretary of the Interior in negotiations with Indian tribes, state representatives, and private water users to secure water rights settlements consistent with the federal trust responsibility to tribes.

=== Counsel and Reclamation Commissioner ===
He served as counsel to the United States Senate Energy and Natural Resources Committee from May 2001 until 2009. While serving as counsel he managed legislation for both the Bureau of Reclamation and the U.S. Geological Survey, developed water resources legislation and handled Native American issues that are within the Energy Committee's jurisdiction. He served as Commissioner of the U.S. Bureau of Reclamation at the U.S. Department of the Interior (DOI), a position he held from 2009 until his appointment as Deputy Secretary.

=== Deputy Secretary of the Interior ===
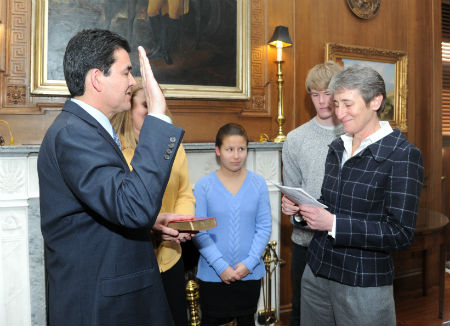
Secretary of the Interior Sally Jewell Swearing In Deputy Secretary Michael L. Connor

On July 31, 2013, President Obama nominated Connor to serve as Deputy Secretary of the Interior, which was vacated by David Hayes who resigned at the end of June 2013. He received a hearing before the United States Senate Committee on Energy and Natural Resources on September 17, 2013. He was later confirmed in a vote of 97–0 on February 27, 2014, and was the first person of Native American descent to serve in that post.

Following his resignation as Deputy Secretary of the Interior, he was appointed as an Environment Program Fellow at the Walton Family Foundation. In September 2017, he joined the law firm of WilmerHale, as a Partner in the firm's Washington, D.C. and Denver, Colorado offices.

=== Assistant Secretary of the Army for Civil Works ===
On April 27, 2021, President Joe Biden announced his intent to nominate Connor to serve as United States Assistant Secretary of the Army for Civil Works in the United States Department of the Army. On July 27, 2021, his nomination was reported out of the Senate Armed Services Committee, then by the United States Senate Committee on Environment and Public Works on September 13, 2021. Connor was confirmed by the Senate on November 4, 2021 by a vote of 92–5. He was sworn into office on November 29, 2021.

== Personal life ==
He and his wife Shari [née Hanson] have a son, Matthew and a daughter, Gabriela.

Political offices
Preceded by David J. Hayes	United States Deputy Secretary of the Interior; 2014–2017	Succeeded by Dave Bernhardt
Preceded by Jaime A. Pinkham; Acting	Assistant Secretary of the Army (Civil Works); 2021–present	Incumbent
