= Tanya Trujillo =

American attorney and political advisor

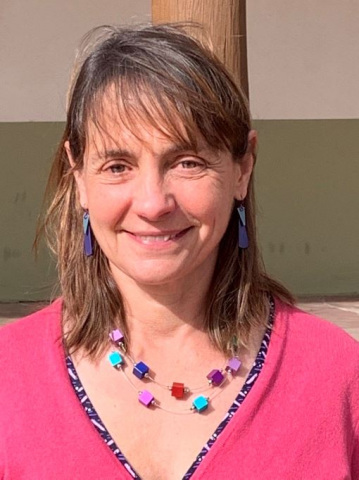

Assistant Secretary of the Interior for Water and Science
- In office June 25, 2021 – July 17, 2023
- President: Joe Biden
- Leader: Deb Haaland
- Preceded by: Timothy R. Petty
- Succeeded by: Andrea Travnicek

Personal details
- Born: Tanya Marie Trujillo New Mexico, U.S.
- Education: Stanford University (BA); University of Iowa (JD)

Tanya Marie Trujillo is an American attorney and political advisor who serves as the Deputy State Engineer and Governor’s water policy adviser for the State of New Mexico. She previously served as the assistant secretary of the United States Department of the Interior for water and science.

== Early life and education ==
A native of New Mexico, Trujillo earned a bachelor's degree from Stanford University and a Juris Doctor from the University of Iowa College of Law.

== Career ==
Trujillo began her career as a natural resources attorney in Santa Fe, New Mexico. She then worked as general counsel of the New Mexico Interstate Stream Commission. Trujillo later worked as counsel to the United States Senate Committee on Energy and Natural Resources and for Senator Jeff Bingaman. Trujillo has most recently served as a project director for the Colorado River Sustainability Campaign. Before holding that position, she was the executive director of the Colorado River Board of California.

=== Interior Department Nomination ===
On April 14, 2021, President Joe Biden nominated Trujillo to be the assistant secretary of the United States Department of the Interior for water and science. Hearings on her nomination were held before the Senate Energy Committee on May 18, 2021. The committee favorably reported the nomination to the Senate floor on May 27, 2021. The entire Senate confirmed Trujillo's nomination on June 17, 2021, by voice vote.

=== Interior Department resignation ===
Trujillo resigned her Interior Department position effective July 17, 2023.
