= Katharine MacGregor =

American government official

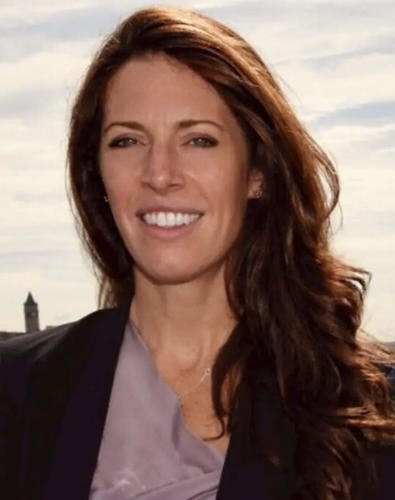
- Official portrait, 2025

United States Deputy Secretary of the Interior
- Incumbent
- Assumed office June 9, 2025
- President: Donald Trump
- Secretary: Doug Burgum
- Preceded by: Tommy Beaudreau
- In office September 30, 2019 – January 20, 2021; Acting: September 30, 2019 – February 25, 2020
- President: Donald Trump
- Secretary: David Bernhardt
- Preceded by: David Bernhardt
- Succeeded by: Tommy Beaudreau

Personal details
- Party: Republican
- Education: University of Pennsylvania (BA)

Katharine MacGregor is an American political advisor and lobbyist who has served the United States deputy secretary of the interior since June 2025. She also held the same position in the final year of President Trump's first term. In first term of Trump's cabinet she assumed office in February 2020, succeeding David Bernhardt, who was confirmed as Secretary of the Interior. In January 2025, President-elect Trump announced his intention to nominate MacGregor as Deputy Secretary of the Interior again for his second term.

== Education ==
MacGregor earned a Bachelor of Arts degree in history and classical studies from the University of Pennsylvania in 2004. As an undergraduate, she studied abroad at the University of St Andrews in Scotland.

== Career ==
She worked as a lobbyist and was then a congressional staffer for Thelma Drake and Eric Cantor. She was also a staffer on the United States House Committee on Natural Resources from 2011 to 2017.

In January 2017, she joined the Trump Administration. She previously served as Principal Deputy Assistant Secretary for Land and Minerals Management before her appointment as United States Deputy Secretary of the Interior.

Political offices
Preceded by David Bernhardt	United States Deputy Secretary of the Interior; 2019–2021	Succeeded by Tommy Beaudreau
Preceded by Tommy Beaudreau	United States Deputy Secretary of the Interior; 2025–present	Incumbent
