= Tommy Beaudreau =

American government official

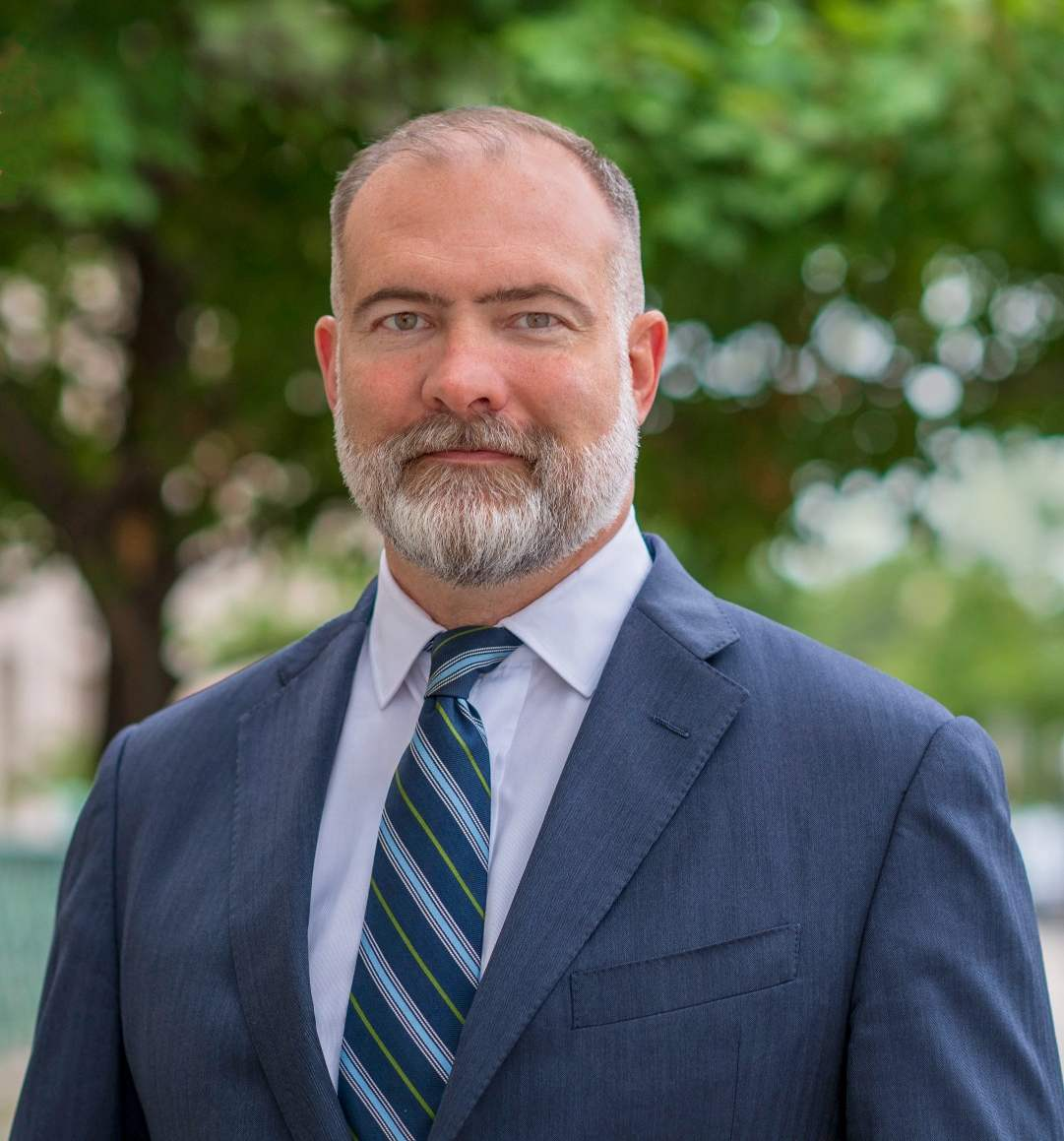

9th United States Deputy Secretary of the Interior
- In office June 23, 2021 – October 27, 2023
- President: Joe Biden
- Preceded by: Katharine MacGregor
- Succeeded by: Katharine MacGregor

1st Director of the Bureau of Ocean Energy Management
- In office June 2010 – May 2014
- President: Barack Obama
- Preceded by: Position established
- Succeeded by: Abigail Ross Hopper

Personal details
- Born: Colorado, U.S.
- Education: Yale University (BA); Georgetown University (JD)

Tommy P. Beaudreau is an American politician who served as the deputy secretary of the Interior from 2021 to 2023. He served as the first director of the Bureau of Ocean Energy Management from 2011 to 2014 and as chief of staff of the United States Department of the Interior from 2014 until the end of the Obama administration.

== Early life and education ==
Beaudreau was born in Colorado. His father took a job to work in the Prudhoe Bay Oil Field, and Beaudreau was raised in the Bear Valley neighborhood of Anchorage, Alaska. He graduated from Service High School. Beaudreau then earned a Bachelor of Arts degree in history from Yale University and a Juris Doctor from the Georgetown University Law Center.

== Career ==
After graduating from law school, Beaudreau worked as an associate at Fried Frank in Washington, DC. In 2000 and 2001, he was a law clerk for Judge Jerome B. Friedman of the United States District Court for the Eastern District of Virginia. Beaudreau then returned to Fried Frank, where he worked as an associate and later partner.

In 2010, Beaudreau became a senior advisor in the Bureau of Ocean Energy Management Regulation and Enforcement. to coordinate the federal response to the Deepwater Horizon Oil Spill. One year later, he became the first director of the Bureau of Ocean Energy Management. He was responsible for the regulations for oil and gas development in the Arctic Ocean. He served until 2014 and was succeeded by Abigail Ross Hopper. From 2014 until the end of the Obama administration in 2016, Beaudreau served as acting Assistant Secretary for Land and Minerals Management, and chief of staff of the United States Department of the Interior.

In January 2017, he became a partner at the Los Angeles law firm Latham & Watkins.

In March 2021, after Elizabeth Klein's nomination for United States Deputy Secretary of the Interior was withdrawn by the Biden administration, it was reported that Beaudreau was selected as the nominee. Lisa Murkowski (R, Alaska) helped to convince Biden to nominate Beaudreau for assistant secretary instead of Liz Klein. On April 15, 2021, his nomination was sent to the Senate. On May 13, 2021, his nomination was reported out of committee by an 18-1 vote. On June 17, 2021, his nomination was confirmed in the United States Senate by an 88-9 vote. On June 23, 2021, he was sworn into office by Secretary Deb Haaland.

Beaudreau has a reputation for being friendly to oil and gas interests. In 2021, he reported working for 35 clients, including numerous companies "from fossil fuel drilling and pipeline firms to offshore wind" which might pose a conflict of interest before the Interior Department. In March 2023, Beaudreau signed the permission for the controversial Willow project, as Secretary of the Interior Deb Haaland's name did not appear on the approval.

On October 4, 2023, Beaudreau announced that he would leave his Interior Department post at the end of October.

On October 1, 2024, the Department of the Interior's Office of the Inspector General revealed that Beaudreau had owned stock in oil companies Exxon Mobil and Chevron from 2022 to 2023, in violation of department ethics rules. Beaudreau told investigators that a financial adviser had bought the stock for him in June 2022, and he did not find out until a year later. He participated in a meeting about an offshore oil drilling regulation the same month he found out about the transactions. He sold the stock after finding out about the transactions.

== Personal life ==
As of 2026, Beaudreau was married and had two children.
