= David Bernhardt =

American lawyer (born 1969)

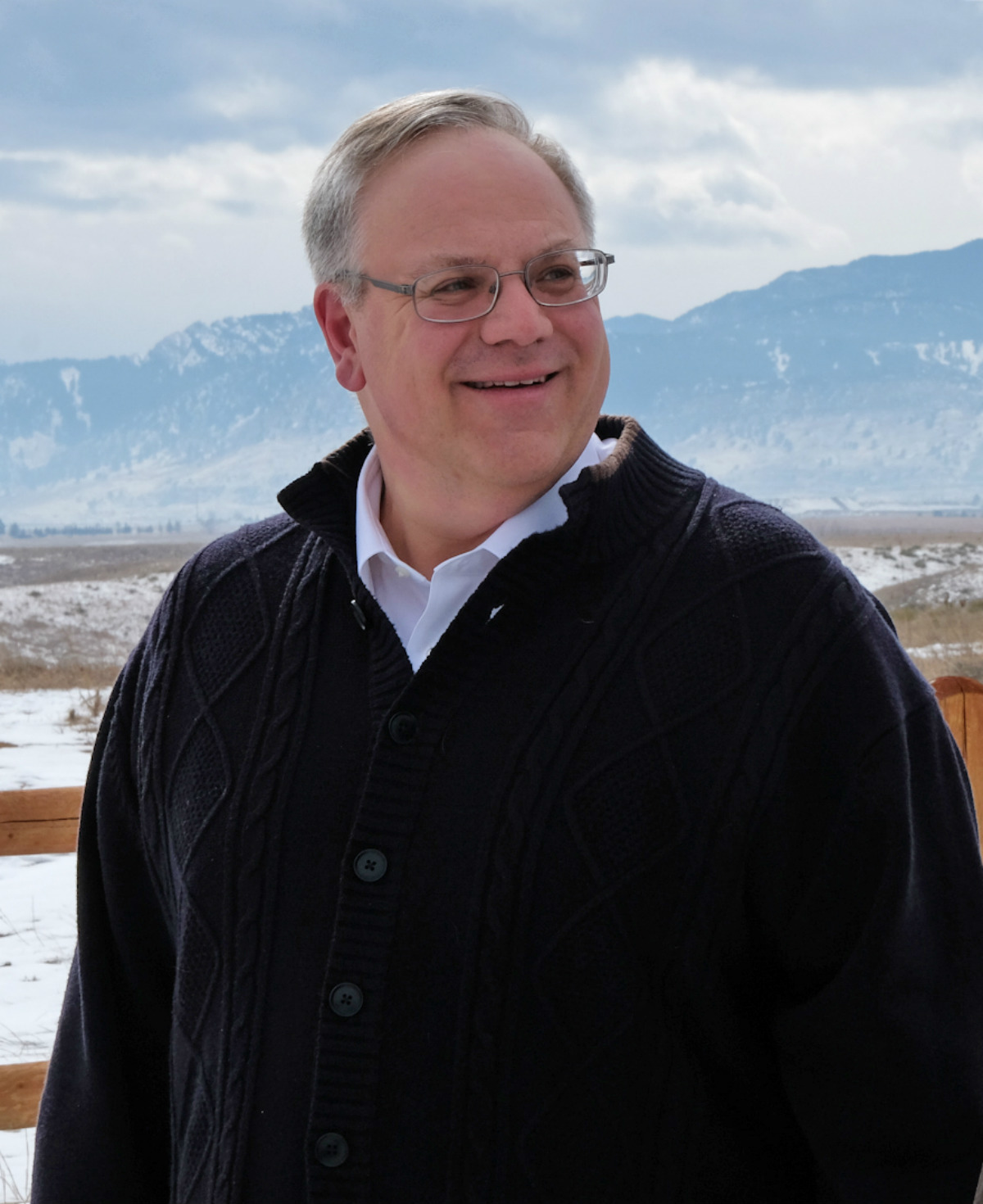
- Bernhardt in 2019

53rd United States Secretary of the Interior
- In office January 2, 2019 – January 20, 2021; Acting: January 2, 2019 – April 11, 2019
- President: Donald Trump
- Deputy: Katharine MacGregor
- Preceded by: Ryan Zinke
- Succeeded by: Deb Haaland

7th United States Deputy Secretary of the Interior
- In office August 1, 2017 – April 11, 2019
- President: Donald Trump
- Preceded by: Michael L. Connor
- Succeeded by: Katharine MacGregor

Solicitor of the United States Department of the Interior
- In office October 5, 2006 – January 20, 2009
- President: George W. Bush
- Preceded by: Sue Ellen Wooldridge
- Succeeded by: Hilary Tompkins

Personal details
- Born: David Longly Bernhardt; August 17, 1969 (age 57) Rifle, Colorado, U.S.
- Party: Republican
- Spouse: Gena Bernhardt
- Children: 2
- Education: University of Northern Colorado (BA); George Washington; University (JD)

David Longly Bernhardt (born August 17, 1969) is an American lawyer who served as the 53rd United States secretary of the interior from 2019 to 2021 in the administration of Donald Trump. He previously was a shareholder at the Colorado law firm Brownstein Hyatt Farber Schreck, where he was a lobbyist and natural resources attorney. He began working for the United States Department of the Interior (DOI) in 2001, and served as the department's solicitor from 2006 to 2009 and deputy secretary from 2017 to 2019.

President Donald Trump nominated Bernhardt to be the deputy secretary of the interior in April 2017. He was confirmed by the U.S. Senate on July 24, 2017, and sworn into office on August 1. He became acting secretary of the interior on January 2, 2019, following Ryan Zinke's resignation. Bernhardt was nominated to officially become Secretary of the Interior in February 2019 and was confirmed on April 11, 2019.

== Early life and education ==
Bernhardt grew up in Rifle, Colorado. His father was a county extension agent and his mother was in the real estate business.

Bernhardt was active in Colorado politics from the age of sixteen, when he made his case to the Rifle City Council not to levy taxes on arcade games at a teen center he was starting in his hometown. He left high school early, earning his GED, then his bachelor's degree from the University of Northern Colorado in 1990. While at the University of Northern Colorado, he applied for and received an internship at the Supreme Court of the United States. He graduated with honors from the George Washington University Law School in 1994. He was admitted to the Colorado Bar Association later that year.

== Career ==
=== Early career ===
Bernhardt began his career as a lawyer in Colorado. In the 1990s, he worked for U.S. Representative Scott McInnis, a Grand Junction Republican. In 1998 he became an associate with Brownstein Hyatt and Farber, a Denver law and lobbying firm.

=== George W. Bush administration ===
Bernhardt worked for the Department of the Interior during George W. Bush's presidency. Early in his career with the DOI, he was deputy chief of staff and counselor to then-secretary of the interior Gale Norton. He also served early on at the DOI as director of congressional and legislative affairs. Later he was confirmed and served as the solicitor at the DOI. He was also the United States commissioner to the International Boundary Commission, U.S. and Canada.

President George W. Bush nominated Bernhardt to serve as Solicitor of the Department of the Interior in November 2005, subject to Senate confirmation. He was the DOI deputy solicitor at the time. Bernhardt was sworn into office in November 2006, after being unanimously confirmed by the U.S. Senate. He served as Solicitor from 2006 to January, 2009.

=== Legal work and lobbying work ===
In 2009, he rejoined the Colorado-based law firm Brownstein Hyatt Farber Schreck. He became a shareholder in the firm and chairman of the firm's natural resources law practice. Bernhardt's clients included Westlands Water District, Halliburton, Cobalt International Energy, Samson Resources, and the Independent Petroleum Association of America.

Through Brownstein Hyatt Farber Schreck, Bernhardt represented entities such as the proposed Rosemont Copper open pit mine in Arizona.

In 2011, Bernhardt filed a lawsuit for the Westlands Water District that "sought to force the feds to make good on a commitment to build a multibillion-dollar system to dispose of the poisoned water" resulting from toxic irrigation in the Westlands district.

He was previously a member of the Virginia Board of Game and Inland Fisheries, and chairman of its Finance, Audit, & Compliance Committee. He resigned prior to January 2017.

=== Trump administration ===
==== DOI transition team ====
Until the end of 2016, Bernhardt remained an attorney and lobbyist for the Westlands Water District. In November 2016, he de-listed himself as a lobbyist in order to comply with the new president's ban on lobbyists joining his administration. After withdrawing his formal registration as a lobbyist, Bernhardt became a consultant to the Westlands Water District for a $20,000 per month retainer. While remaining a lawyer at Brownstein Hyatt Farber and Schreck, after November 2016 Bernhardt was briefly in charge of the Interior Department transition team for President Donald Trump. In that role, he was in charge of overseeing staffing in the Department of the Interior along with Devin Nunes.

Until resigning by early 2017, he was on the board of the Center for Environmental Science Accuracy and Reliability.

==== Deputy Secretary of the Interior ====
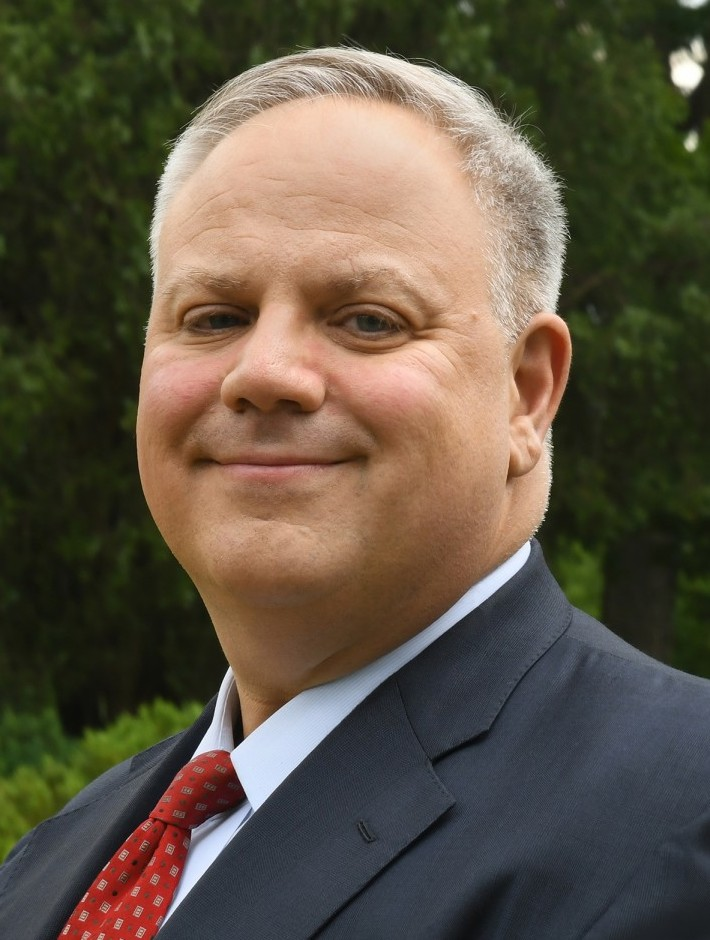
Deputy Secretary Bernhardt

On April 28, 2017, Trump nominated Bernhardt to be the deputy secretary of the interior. The role made Bernhardt the "top deputy to Interior Secretary Ryan Zinke and COO of the federal lands and energy agency". The appointment was praised by Zinke, Republican members of Congress, and former-interior secretary Dirk Kempthorne, as well as Outdoor Recreation Industry Roundtable, Ducks Unlimited, and the Boone and Crocket Club. His nomination was strongly opposed by conservationists, fishing groups, and California Democrats, who cited his history of representing and lobbying on behalf of oil companies and agricultural interests as well as conflict-of-interest concerns arising from his firm's work on regulation issues with the DOI.

At his confirmation hearing before the Senate Energy and Natural Resources Committee in mid-May 2017, Bernhardt testified that "I believe we need to take the science as it comes, whatever that is," and "apply the law and be honest with the science" at the Interior Department but also said the president's views, rather than the recommendations of climate scientists, would guide the Interior Department's policies whenever possible. Ethics issues were raised by Senators such as Maria Cantwell, with Bernhardt replying he took ethics very seriously. He said that unless he received authorization to do so, he would not involve himself substantially in any particular matter involving his former clients.

On July 24, 2017, the Senate confirmed Bernhardt's nomination by a vote of 53–43. He was then sworn into office on August 1, 2017.

During Bernhardt's tenure as deputy secretary and acting secretary the Department of the Interior substantially increased fossil fuel sales on public land and embarked on a program of deregulation.

In 2019, Politico reported that heads of the oil industry lobbying group Independent Petroleum Association of America (IPAA) celebrated their ties to Bernhardt, who had IPAA as a client during his legal career.

In August 2020, the Interior Department's inspector general released a report concluding that the agency had withheld sensitive public documents related to Bernhardt prior to his Senate confirmation and that this action did not violate any legal or ethical standards.

==== Secretary of the Interior ====
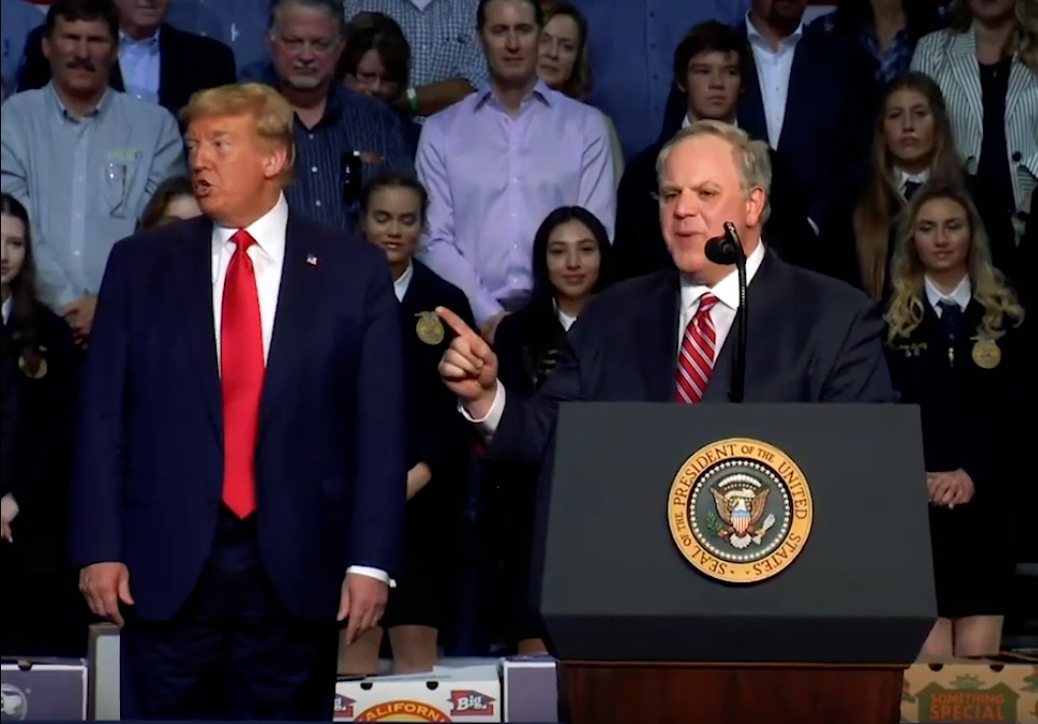
Bernhardt as secretary of the interior and President Trump in Bakersfield, California in February 2020

On January 2, 2019, Bernhardt became acting secretary of the interior, replacing Ryan Zinke. On February 4, 2019, Trump nominated Bernhardt to be Secretary of the Interior. He was confirmed by the Senate on April 11, 2019, by a vote of 56 to 41.

In May 2019, the House Oversight Committee investigated whether Bernhardt was complying with record-keeping laws.

In September 2019, the Government Accountability Office (GAO) released a report finding that Bernhardt, then acting secretary, had twice violated federal law when in January 2019 he directed the National Park Service to use park entrance fees for maintenance in keeping parks open during the government shutdown. The GAO report concluded that the Interior Department moved funds between accounts without authorization from Congress in violation of the Antideficiency Act and federal appropriations law. The Interior Department rejected the GAO's conclusion that any laws were violated, and maintained that the directive was an "appropriate and lawful use of Federal Lands Recreation Enhancement Act funds."

Bernhardt was chosen as the designated survivor during Trump's 2020 State of the Union Address.

In May 2020, two activist groups sued over Bernhardt's ongoing interim appointments of William Perry Pendley to run the Bureau of Land Management and David Vela to lead the National Park Service, appointments that bypassed a Senate confirmation process.

On August 4, 2020, the Great American Outdoors Act was signed into law by President Donald Trump. Bernhardt announced that August 4 would be designated "Great American Outdoors Day" and that each year on that day entrance to national parks would be free.

Bernhardt relocated the headquarters of the Bureau of Land Management from Washington, D.C., to Grand Junction, Colorado, on August 11, 2020.

Bernhardt on August 17, 2020, announced plans for an oil and gas leasing program in the Arctic National Wildlife Refuge, clearing the way for drilling in the remote Alaskan area.

On August 20, 2020, Bernhardt designated the site of the 1908 Springfield Race Riot for inclusion in the National Park Service's African American Civil Rights Network. It is the 30th site to achieve such a designation, which includes sites associated with the civil rights movement in the United States, such as the Selma to Montgomery National Historic Trail in Alabama and the Pullman National Monument in Chicago.

On September 11, 2020, Bernhardt introduced Trump at the Flight 93 Memorial.

=== Post-government career ===
After leaving the Department of the Interior, Bernhardt rejoined his former law firm Brownstein Hyatt Farber Shreck as a senior counsel. Bernhardt is the chairman of the America First Policy Institute's Center for American Freedom. In November of 2024, the New York Times reported that Bernhardt was involved in the Trump Vance presidential transition. In 2023, he published You Report to Me. Accountability for the Failing Administrative State (Encounter Books, 2023). The book relates his experience serving in various capacities in the U.S. Department of Interior, including as Secretary in the first term of President Donald Trump.

== Personal life ==
He lives in Arlington, Virginia, with his wife Gena. Bernhardt is a hunter and angler.

== See also ==
- Environmental policy of the first Donald Trump administration

Political offices
Preceded by Michael L. Connor	United States Deputy Secretary of the Interior; 2017–2019	Succeeded by Katharine MacGregor
Preceded by Ryan Zinke	United States Secretary of the Interior; 2019–2021	Succeeded by Deb Haaland
U.S. order of precedence (ceremonial)
Preceded by Robert Wilkie as Former U.S. Cabinet Member	Order of precedence of the United States as Former U.S. Cabinet Member	Succeeded by Mark Esper as Former U.S. Cabinet Member
