= United States Deputy Secretary of the Interior =

Name of the present secretary of the Interior

Deputy Secretary of the Interior of the United States
- Seal of the Department of the Interior

- Flag of the deputy secretary of the interior

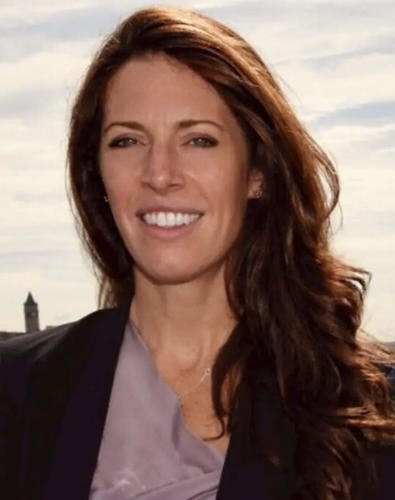
- Incumbent; Katharine MacGregor since June 9, 2025
- Department of the Interior
- Style: Madam Deputy Secretary (informal); The Honorable (formal)
- Reports to: Secretary
- Seat: Washington, D.C., United States
- Appointer: The president; with Senate advice and consent
- Term length: No fixed term
- Constituting instrument: 45 U.S.C. § 1452
- Formation: 1995
- First holder: John Garamendi
- Salary: Level II of the Executive Schedule
- Website: www.doi.gov

The deputy secretary of the interior, in the United States government, advises and assists the secretary of the interior in the supervision and direction of the Department of the Interior and its activities, and succeeds the secretary in their absence, sickness, or unavailability. The deputy secretary of the interior is appointed by the president and confirmed by the Senate. In 1990, the title of the position was changed from under secretary of the interior to deputy secretary of the interior.

After Elizabeth Klein's nomination was withdrawn by the Biden administration in March 2021, it was reported that Beaudreau was selected as the nominee. On April 15, 2021, his nomination was sent to the Senate. On June 17, 2021, his nomination was confirmed in the United States Senate by an 88–9 vote. Beaudreau resigned in October 2023 and Laura Daniel-Davis was appointed as acting deputy secretary.

Section 3346 of U.S. Code within Title 5, or 5 U.S.C. § 3346, details time limitations of acting officers. An acting officer may serve no longer than 210 days after the vacancy, from the date a first or second nomination is pending before the Senate, the date a first or second nomination is withdrawn, rejected, or returned, or the date the Senate reconvenes if the appointment has taken place while Congress has adjourned sine die.

== List of deputy secretaries of interior ==
#	Image	Name	Term began	Term ended	President appointed by
1		John Garamendi	August 15, 1995	April 1998	Bill Clinton
2		David J. Hayes	January 3, 1999	January 20, 2001	Bill Clinton
3		J. Steven Griles	July 12, 2001	December 7, 2004	George W. Bush
4		Lynn Scarlett	November 22, 2005	May 22, 2009	George W. Bush
5		David J. Hayes	May 22, 2009	June 30, 2013	Barack Obama
6		Michael L. Connor	February 27, 2014	January 20, 2017	Barack Obama
–		Julie Lillie; Acting	January 20, 2017	August 1, 2017	Donald Trump
7		David L. Bernhardt	August 1, 2017	April 11, 2019	Donald Trump
8		Katharine MacGregor	September 30, 2019	February 25, 2020	Donald Trump
8		Katharine MacGregor	February 25, 2020	January 20, 2021	Donald Trump
9		Tommy Beaudreau	June 23, 2021	October 27, 2023	Joe Biden
–		Laura Daniel-Davis; Acting	October 31, 2023	January 20, 2025	Joe Biden
10		Katharine MacGregor	June 9, 2025	Incumbent	Donald Trump
