= List of United States tornadoes from June to July 2018 =

United States tornadoes from June to July 2018
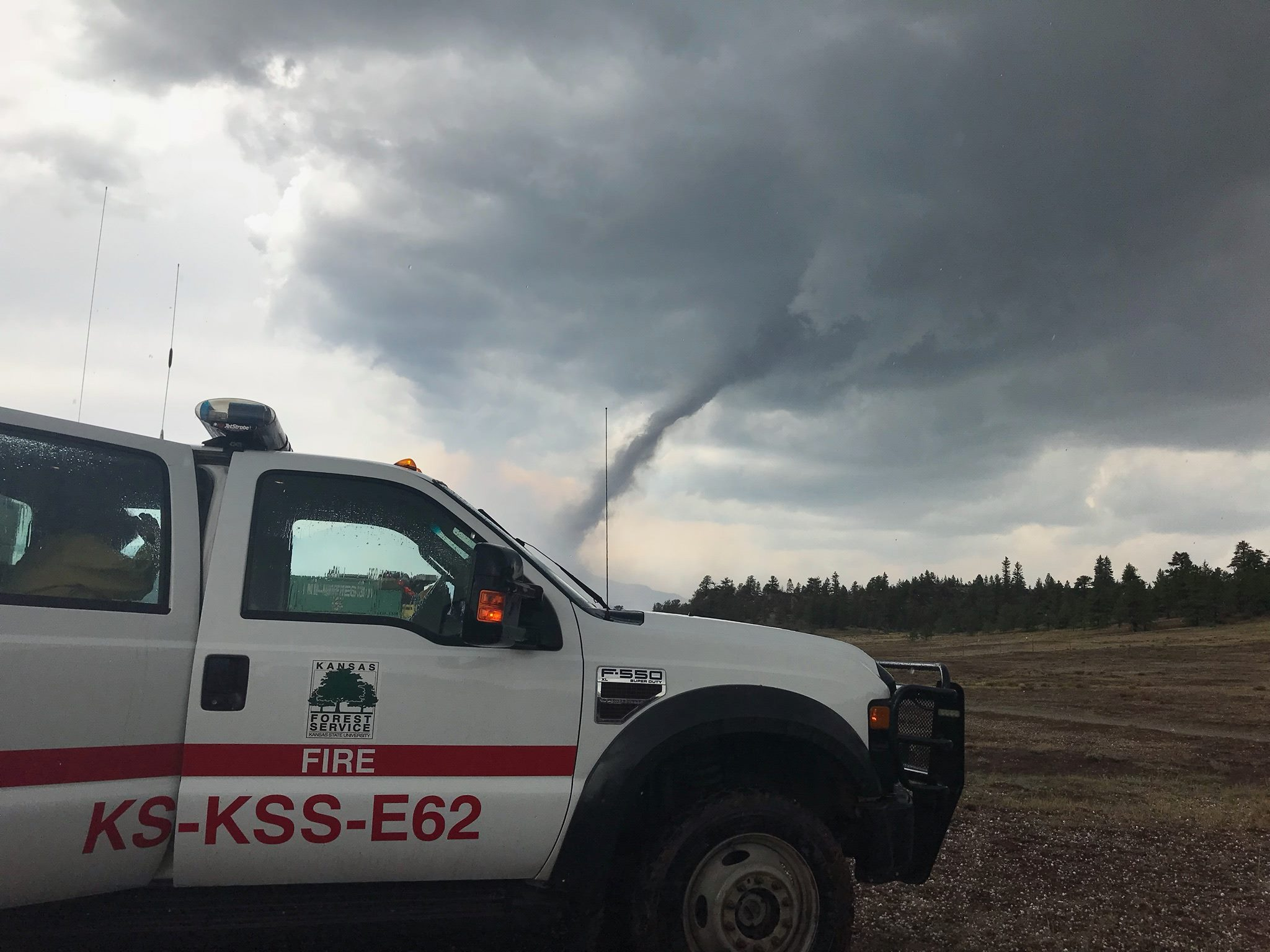
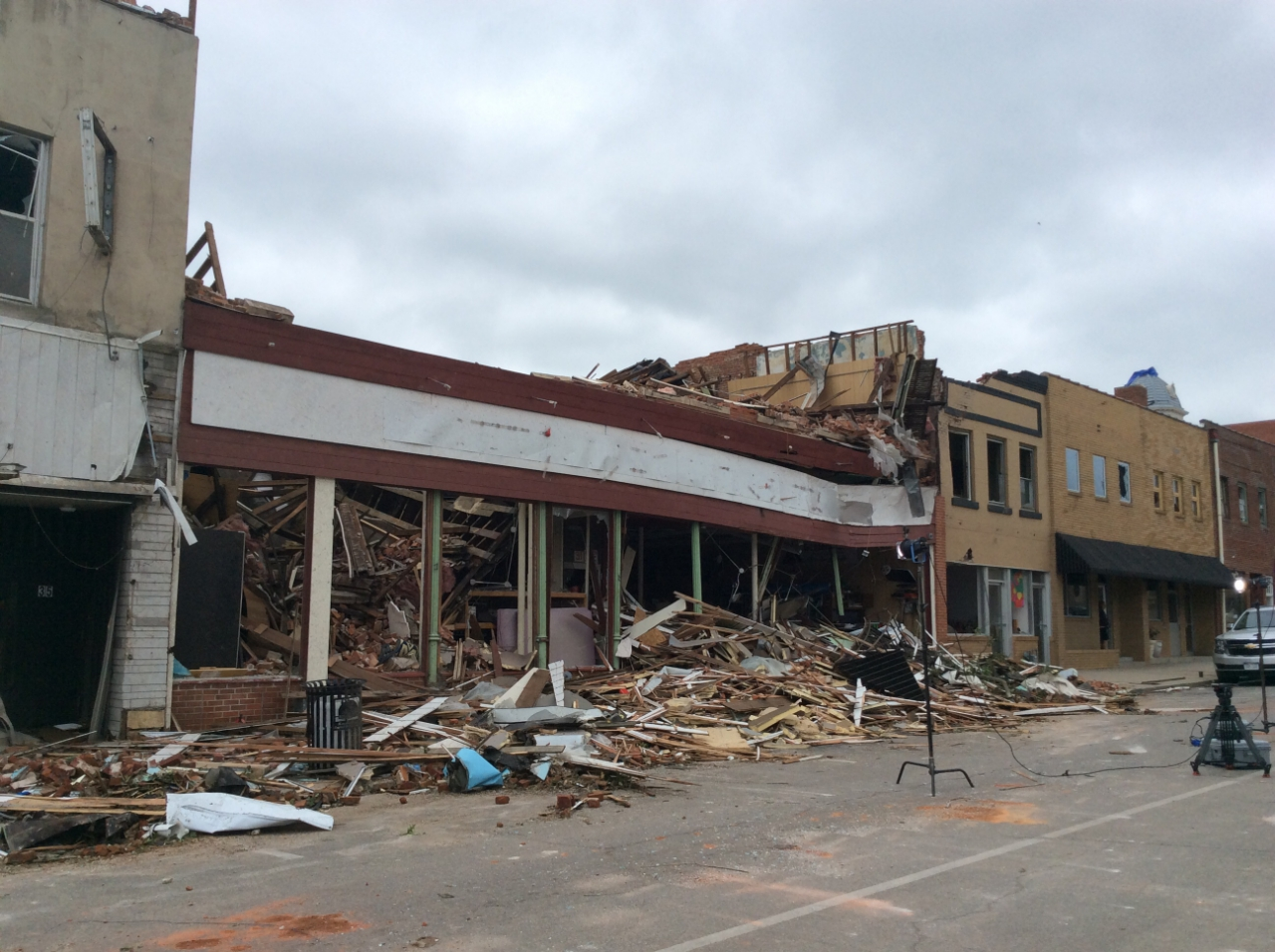
- Clockwise from top: A Kansas Forest Service truck deployed to the Weston Pass Fire halted as an EF0 tornado passes over on July 5; A building in Marshalltown, Iowa destroyed after an EF3 tornado struck the town on July 19; An EF0 tornado near Round Rock, Texas on July 4.
- Timespan: June 1 – July 31
- Maximum rated tornado: EF3 tornado: Gillette, Wyoming on June 1; Laramie, Wyoming on June 6; Eureka, Kansas on June 26; Capitol, Montana on June 28; Pella, Iowa on July 19; Marshalltown, Iowa on July 19; Douglas, Wyoming on July 28
- Tornadoes: 244
- Fatalities: 1
- Injuries: 83

This page documents all tornadoes confirmed by various weather forecast offices of the National Weather Service in the United States throughout June and July 2018. Tornado counts are considered preliminary until final publication in the database of the National Centers for Environmental Information.

== United States yearly total ==
Confirmed tornadoes by Enhanced Fujita rating
EFU	EF0	EF1	EF2	EF3	EF4	EF5	Total
15	619	399	76	12	0	0	1,121

== June ==
Confirmed tornadoes by Enhanced Fujita rating
EFU	EF0	EF1	EF2	EF3	EF4	EF5	Total
2	110	27	10	4	0	0	153

=== June 1 event ===
List of confirmed tornadoes – Friday, June 1, 2018 (Note: All dates are based on the local time zone where the tornado touched down; however, all times are in Coordinated Universal Time for consistency.)
EF#	Location	County / Parish	State	Start Coord.	Time (UTC)	Path length	Max width
EF2	E of Ten Sleep	Washakie	WY	43.9988°N 107.1501°W	18:11–18:15	0.98 mi (1.58 km)	300 yd (270 m)
EF2	A high-end EF2 tornado moved through a heavily forested area, snapping roughly 1,000 trees at their bases.						
EF2	NW of Mayoworth	Johnson	WY	44.0285°N 107.1061°W	18:16–18:21	1.03 mi (1.66 km)	300 yd (270 m)
EF2	Nearly 1,000 trees were snapped as this tornado moved through a heavily forested area.						
EF0	W of Gillette	Campbell	WY	44.2953°N 105.7304°W	19:34–19:38	1.03 mi (1.66 km)	25 yd (23 m)
EF0	A rope tornado remained over open country, causing no damage.						
EF3	NW of Gillette	Campbell	WY	44.329°N 105.711°W	19:41–19:52	3.76 mi (6.05 km)	200 yd (180 m)
EF3	Multiple well-anchored, double-wide manufactured homes were heavily damaged or destroyed as this strong cone tornado moved through the Oriva Hills subdivision. One home was removed from its foundation before being thrown 100 yards through the air and obliterated. The metal frame from the home was found in two pieces 200 yards away, and a pickup truck was thrown 250 yards. Another pickup truck with an attached trailer was thrown 50 yards, and a horse trailer was thrown 100 yards. An RV camper was overturned, outbuildings were damaged or destroyed, and trees and power poles were snapped. Two people were injured.						
EF1	Northern Gillette	Campbell	WY	44.328°N 105.482°W	19:55–19:56	0.47 mi (0.76 km)	25 yd (23 m)
EF1	A brief tornado struck a subdivision in the northern part of Gillette. Fences were destroyed, with a piece of fencing embedded at least 6 inches into the ground. An RV camper was rolled over onto a vehicle, another camper was destroyed, and a shed was badly damaged.						
EF1	N of Gillette	Campbell	WY	44.379°N 105.552°W	19:59–20:07	4.62 mi (7.44 km)	50 yd (46 m)
EF1	Seven power poles were snapped or bent. The control room building and several vehicles at the Eagle Butte Mine were damaged. Additional vehicles were moved and damaged and a dumpster was thrown a few hundred yards at a power plant. Small vehicle trailers were tossed up to 100 yards away.						
EF0	NNW of Killdeer	Dunn	ND	47.47°N 102.84°W	22:26–22:27	0.3 mi (0.48 km)	50 yd (46 m)
EF0	A brief tornado touched down in an open field, causing no damage.						
EF2	N of Killdeer	Dunn	ND	47.5°N 102.75°W	22:34–22:42	3.49 mi (5.62 km)	200 yd (180 m)
EF2	A mobile home and an outbuilding were completely destroyed, a stock trailer was flipped, and a truck was pushed 200 yards through a fence.						
EF0	Southeastern Hebron	Morton	ND	46.87°N 102.05°W	22:53–00:08	7.28 mi (11.72 km)	100 yd (91 m)
EF0	This tornado clipped the southeast corner of Hebron, causing minor tree damage.						
EF0	N of Mandaree	McKenzie	ND	47.77°N 102.68°W	22:55–22:56	0.29 mi (0.47 km)	50 yd (46 m)
EF0	A tornado was caught on video. The tornado remained over open fields and caused no damage.						
EF0	S of Golden Valley	Mercer	ND	47.05°N 102.05°W	23:25–23:28	1.38 mi (2.22 km)	75 yd (69 m)
EF0	This tornado remained over open country, causing no damage.						
EF0	NE of Glenham	Walworth	SD	45.5353°N 100.2639°W	00:36–00:37	0.11 mi (0.18 km)	10 yd (9.1 m)
EF0	A brief tornado was observed by the public. No damage occurred.						
EFU	S of Jayton	Kent	TX	33.13°N 100.54°W	01:43	0.01 mi (0.016 km)	30 yd (27 m)
EFU	This brief tornado remained over open country, causing no damage.						
EF0	E of Ord	Valley	NE	41.6024°N 98.905°W	02:14	0.01 mi (0.016 km)	40 yd (37 m)
EF0	A tornado briefly touched down. No damage occurred.						
EF0	W of Madison	Madison	NE	41.83°N 97.61°W	02:59–03:00	0.1 mi (0.16 km)	50 yd (46 m)
EF0	A tornado briefly touched down. No damage occurred.						

=== June 3 event ===
List of confirmed tornadoes – Sunday, June 3, 2018
EF#	Location	County / Parish	State	Start Coord.	Time (UTC)	Path length	Max width
EF0	NW of Acoma Pueblo	Cibola	NM	34.9326°N 107.6303°W	19:21–19:30	2.35 mi (3.78 km)	50 yd (46 m)
EF0	Trained storm spotters and tribal emergency management reported a small tornado over open range land.						
EF0	WSW of Progresso	Torrance	NM	34.44°N 106.03°W	22:56–23:06	2.61 mi (4.20 km)	50 yd (46 m)
EF0	A trained storm spotter observed a small tornado over open range land.						
EF0	S of Finleyville	Washington	PA	40.244°N 80.0089°W	00:11–00:13	0.11 mi (0.18 km)	15 yd (14 m)
EF0	Several large trees were snapped and a two-story garage had both of its entry doors damaged, as well as siding removed from its facade. A wooden vehicle trailer was tossed 30 feet, and a large area of tall grass was flattened in a convergent pattern.						

=== June 6 event ===
List of confirmed tornadoes – Wednesday, June 6, 2018
EF#	Location	County / Parish	State	Start Coord.	Time (UTC)	Path length	Max width
EF3	N of Laramie	Albany	WY	41.469°N 105.676°W	23:43–00:36	11.3 mi (18.2 km)	600 yd (550 m)
EF3	Numerous wooden power poles were snapped by this large stovepipe tornado. Several galvanized steel utility poles were toppled over, and were bent at a 90-degree angle at the base. Extensive ground scouring occurred, with a large amount of grass scoured from the ground along a wide swath.						
EF2	N of Laramie	Albany	WY	41.416°N 105.605°W	23:43–00:05	0.6 mi (0.97 km)	50 yd (46 m)
EF2	A strong satellite tornado to the above event damaged trees and caused significant structural damage to the well-built attached garage of a frame home. The garage structure was shifted from its foundation and collapsed. Several nearby homes sustained minor damage to their shingles and siding.						
EF0	NW of Grant	Perkins	NE	40.90°N 101.79°W	01:24	0.1 mi (0.16 km)	10 yd (9.1 m)
EF0	An empty grain bin was tossed into a parked semi-truck, and then deposited on a tractor at an agricultural storage area.						

=== June 7 event ===
List of confirmed tornadoes – Thursday, June 7, 2018
EF#	Location	County / Parish	State	Start Coord.	Time (UTC)	Path length	Max width
EF1	WSW of Lame Deer	Big Horn	MT	45.5586°N 106.7603°W	23:40–23:45	0.75 mi (1.21 km)	100 yd (91 m)
EF1	A 20 ft (6.1 m) grain bin was tossed 250 yd (230 m). A trailer was damaged and blown across a driveway, and a home had its gutters and part of its metal roofing ripped off. Numerous large trees were snapped or uprooted.						

=== June 8 event ===
List of confirmed tornadoes – Friday, June 8, 2018
EF#	Location	County / Parish	State	Start Coord.	Time (UTC)	Path length	Max width
EF0	SE of Tower City	Cass	ND	46.86°N 97.59°W	21:00–21:04	1.04 mi (1.67 km)	200 yd (180 m)
EF0	Some large tree branches were snapped in shelter belts as a result of this weak tornado.						
EF0	NW of Michigan	Nelson	ND	48.05°N 98.15°W	21:12–21:13	0.25 mi (0.40 km)	75 yd (69 m)
EF0	A brief tornado kicked up significant dust, but caused no damage.						
EF0	SE of Chaffee	Cass	ND	46.74°N 97.31°W	21:47	0.15 mi (0.24 km)	50 yd (46 m)
EF0	A storm chaser videoed a brief tornado in an open field. No damage occurred.						
EF1	WNW of Niagara	Nelson	ND	48.01°N 97.93°W	21:54–22:06	2.69 mi (4.33 km)	150 yd (140 m)
EF1	Multiple trees were snapped or uprooted in shelter belts along the path.						
EF0	WNW of Emerado	Grand Forks	ND	47.93°N 97.40°W	22:12–22:14	0.93 mi (1.50 km)	100 yd (91 m)
EF0	A brief tornado remained over open country, causing no damage.						
EF0	WNW of Kindred	Cass	ND	46.68°N 97.14°W	22:21	0.05 mi (0.080 km)	25 yd (23 m)
EF0	The public reported a brief tornado. No damage occurred.						
EF0	W of Grand Forks	Grand Forks	ND	47.92°N 97.26°W	22:30–22:34	1 mi (1.6 km)	100 yd (91 m)
EF0	At least one tree and several small willow bushes were snapped.						

=== June 9 event ===
List of confirmed tornadoes – Saturday, June 9, 2018
EF#	Location	County / Parish	State	Start Coord.	Time (UTC)	Path length	Max width
EF1	SE of Forest City	Winnebago	IA	43.3016°N 93.63°W	20:07–20:13	2.75 mi (4.43 km)	80 yd (73 m)
EF1	Power transmission poles were snapped and crops were damaged.						
EF0	Oak Hill	Volusia	FL	28.8989°N 80.861°W	20:20–20:21	0.49 mi (0.79 km)	150 yd (140 m)
EF0	A few homes and a carport suffered minor damage.						
EF0	SSE of Fertile	Cerro Gordo	IA	43.22°N 93.40°W	20:36–20:38	1.18 mi (1.90 km)	30 yd (27 m)
EF0	Live storm chasing video confirmed a brief, weak tornado. No damage occurred.						
EF0	SW of Angola	Steuben	IN	41.6051°N 85.0271°W	22:30–22:31	0.68 mi (1.09 km)	200 yd (180 m)
EF0	A weak multiple-vortex tornado damaged two barns and downed numerous trees. A third structure sustained damage to its roof.						
EF1	Southern Angola	Steuben	IN	41.6138°N 85.0163°W	22:34–22:40	0.89 mi (1.43 km)	375 yd (343 m)
EF1	Numerous trees were snapped or uprooted, and a few structures at the south edge of town suffered minor roof damage as well.						
EF1	SE of Winthrop	Buchanan	IA	42.4419°N 91.6231°W	02:36–02:37	0.1 mi (0.16 km)	20 yd (18 m)
EF1	A home had its garage door blown in, allowing wind to enter the structure and remove the roof. Some trees were also damaged.						

=== June 10 event ===
List of confirmed tornadoes – Sunday, June 10, 2018
EF#	Location	County / Parish	State	Start Coord.	Time (UTC)	Path length	Max width
EF0	Western Champaign	Champaign	IL	40.0844°N 88.3192°W	19:16–19:17	0.06 mi (0.097 km)	30 yd (27 m)
EF0	This brief, weak tornado touched down in a subdivision at the west edge of town. The roofs of two homes, a shed, fencing, and some trees sustained damage.						
EF0	Southwestern Champaign	Champaign	IL	40.0677°N 88.2952°W	19:19–19:20	0.06 mi (0.097 km)	20 yd (18 m)
EF0	A brief, weak tornado touched down in a residential area in southwestern Champaign. Two homes sustained minor damage, and treetops were snapped off.						

=== June 11 event ===
List of confirmed tornadoes – Monday, June 11, 2018
EF#	Location	County / Parish	State	Start Coord.	Time (UTC)	Path length	Max width
EF0	Louisville	Cass	NE	41°N 96.16°W	22:40–22:41	0.1 mi (0.16 km)	10 yd (9.1 m)
EF0	Storm chasers reported a brief cone-shaped tornado.						
EF0	SW of Plattsmouth	Cass	NE	40.9726°N 96.018°W	23:30–23:33	0.26 mi (0.42 km)	75 yd (69 m)
EF0	A shed had its metal panels ripped off, and a farm house saw its shingles removed. Large trees and tree limbs were downed.						
EF0	NW of Murray	Cass	NE	40.9442°N 96.0081°W	23:32–23:35	0.26 mi (0.42 km)	20 yd (18 m)
EF0	Small trees and large tree limbs were downed.						
EF0	McPaul	Fremont	IA	40.82°N 95.8°W	23:59–00:00	0.1 mi (0.16 km)	10 yd (9.1 m)
EF0	Trees were damaged, and an empty tractor trailer was moved from its mooring blocks.						
EF0	NE of Elk Creek	Johnson	NE	40.3274°N 96.0958°W	01:00–01:02	0.05 mi (0.080 km)	25 yd (23 m)
EF0	Minor tree damage occurred.						
EF0	NW of Table Rock	Pawnee	NE	40.2228°N 96.1757°W	01:05–01:06	0.02 mi (0.032 km)	20 yd (18 m)
EF0	Minor tree damage occurred.						

=== June 12 event ===
List of confirmed tornadoes – Tuesday, June 12, 2018
EF#	Location	County / Parish	State	Start Coord.	Time (UTC)	Path length	Max width
EF0	WSW of Panhandle	Carson	TX	35.34°N 101.41°W	23:46	0.1 mi (0.16 km)	10 yd (9.1 m)
EF0	Multiple storm chasers reported a brief landspout tornado. No damage occurred.						

=== June 13 event ===
List of confirmed tornadoes – Wednesday, June 13, 2018
EF#	Location	County / Parish	State	Start Coord.	Time (UTC)	Path length	Max width
EF0	NNE of Canal Point	Palm Beach	FL	26.8496°N 80.6396°W	18:10	0.01 mi (0.016 km)	5 yd (4.6 m)
EF0	Multiple trained storm spotters reported a landspout tornado over an open field. No damage occurred.						
EF0	WSW of Little Dixie	Prairie	AR	35°N 91.39°W	21:51–22:05	1.02 mi (1.64 km)	20 yd (18 m)
EF0	A landspout tornado damaged a field pumping station but otherwise remained over rice and soybean fields.						
EF1	NW of Gallitzin	Cambria	PA	40.5088°N 78.6037°W	00:44–00:45	0.47 mi (0.76 km)	150 yd (140 m)
EF1	This brief tornado moved through a wooded area, snapping and uprooting many trees.						
EF2	Granville Township to Franklin Township	Bradford	PA	41.7182°N 76.6881°W	00:16–00:26	5.16 mi (8.30 km)	250 yd (230 m)
EF2	A strong tornado heavily damaged a machine shop and a house shortly after touching down. Farther along the path, a house sustained significant roof damage and a trailer was thrown 80 yards. The most intense damage occurred in the West Franklin community, where multiple homes sustained major structural damage and one was destroyed. A church was also damaged in this area. A garage was destroyed and a trailer was tossed against the side of a house before the tornado dissipated. A large swath of trees was flattened along the path as well.						
EF2	Wilkes-Barre	Luzerne	PA	41.2436°N 75.8467°W	02:02–02:10	2.9 mi (4.7 km)	150 yd (140 m)
EF2	A high-end EF2 tornado touched down in Wilkes-Barre, severely damaging or destroying businesses along its path. A shopping center was significantly damaged, and a U-Haul store sustained total destruction of its top floor, with multiple rental trucks flipped and tossed nearby. Other structures sustained roof loss, collapse of exterior walls, and had windows blown out. Cars were thrown and damaged in parking lots, and large amounts of structural debris was scattered throughout the area. Many power poles were snapped as well, with numerous power lines downed. Six people were injured.						

=== June 14 event ===
List of confirmed tornadoes – Thursday, June 14, 2018
EF#	Location	County / Parish	State	Start Coord.	Time (UTC)	Path length	Max width
EF0	E of Rolla	Rolette	ND	48.8522°N 99.5879°W	02:14–02:15	0.39 mi (0.63 km)	50 yd (46 m)
EF0	The public observed a tornado in a grass field. No damage occurred.						
EF1	W of Amourdale	Towner	ND	48.84°N 99.47°W	02:18–02:24	3.43 mi (5.52 km)	200 yd (180 m)
EF1	At least one power pole was snapped while power lines were torn down.						
EF1	SSW of Rocklake	Towner	ND	48.74°N 99.28°W	02:45–02:56	4 mi (6.4 km)	250 yd (230 m)
EF1	A hopper bottom grain bin was tossed about 40 yd (37 m), cattle fencing was blown down at a farmstead, and numerous large tree limbs were snapped.						
EF1	Calio	Cavalier	ND	48.62°N 98.94°W	03:24–03:33	4 mi (6.4 km)	200 yd (180 m)
EF1	A rain-wrapped tornado struck Calio, where several trees were downed and steel sheets were ripped off of a shop roof in town.						

=== June 15 event ===
List of confirmed tornadoes – Friday, June 15, 2018
EF#	Location	County / Parish	State	Start Coord.	Time (UTC)	Path length	Max width
EF0	W of Wynne	Cross	AR	35.2328°N 90.9143°W	22:25–22:30	0.6 mi (0.97 km)	75 yd (69 m)
EF0	The public reported a weak landspout tornado.						

=== June 16 event ===
List of confirmed tornadoes – Saturday, June 16, 2018
EF#	Location	County / Parish	State	Start Coord.	Time (UTC)	Path length	Max width
EF0	NE of Poynette	Columbia	WI	43.4359°N 89.3507°W	22:20–22:22	0.14 mi (0.23 km)	50 yd (46 m)
EF0	A tornado was photographed and videoed. No damage occurred.						
EF0	S of Burdette	Hand	SD	44.6349°N 98.7958°W	01:07–01:10	0.43 mi (0.69 km)	10 yd (9.1 m)
EF0	Large tree branches were lofted and corn crops were bent or flattened.						
EF0	SE of Burdette	Hand	SD	44.6348°N 98.7371°W	01:16–01:18	0.08 mi (0.13 km)	10 yd (9.1 m)
EF0	A calving barn was rolled and tossed about 100 ft (30 m), destroying a fence and severely damaging a chicken coop in the process. Sheet metal was ripped from another barn. A hay bale was lifted out of a feeder and ripped apart, chemical and water storage tanks were tossed about 50 ft (15 m), and other hay bales were rolled.						

=== June 17 event ===
List of confirmed tornadoes – Sunday, June 17, 2018
EF#	Location	County / Parish	State	Start Coord.	Time (UTC)	Path length	Max width
EF1	W of Big Springs	Deuel	NE	41.07°N 102.197°W	20:17–20:28	2.14 mi (3.44 km)	162 yd (148 m)
EF1	At one homestead, a pig shed lost a portion of its roof, and two-by-six beams were tossed 60 yd (55 m) into the side of a garage, puncturing the structure. Asphalt was ripped from a nearby outbuilding. At a second homestead, the tornado flipped a pivot irrigation sprinkler. Large branches were snapped off trees along the path.						
EF0	NW of Julesburg	Sedgwick	CO	41.00°N 102.29°W	20:20	0.01 mi (0.016 km)	50 yd (46 m)
EF0	A tornado was photographed and videoed by a storm chaser. No damage occurred.						
EF0	NW of Brule	Keith	NE	41.18°N 101.93°W	20:50	0.1 mi (0.16 km)	10 yd (9.1 m)
EF0	A brief tornado was photographed in an open field by a trained storm spotter. No damage occurred.						
EF0	NE of Keystone	Keith	NE	41.36°N 101.36°W	21:01	0.1 mi (0.16 km)	10 yd (9.1 m)
EF0	A brief tornado was photographed in an open field by a storm chaser. No damage occurred.						
EF1	SW of Tryon	McPherson	NE	41.402°N 101.263°W	22:13–22:17	2.13 mi (3.43 km)	195 yd (178 m)
EF1	A rental house and a tree line were damaged, and a piece of wood was impaled into a deer stand. At a homestead, the windows were shattered, a door was blown in with the door jamb damaged, and a pivot irrigation sprinkler was flipped.						

=== June 18 event ===
List of confirmed tornadoes – Monday, June 18, 2018
EF#	Location	County / Parish	State	Start Coord.	Time (UTC)	Path length	Max width
EF0	E of Bath to S of Easton	Grafton	NH	44.15°N 72.00°W	19:03–19:15	9.45 mi (15.21 km)	25 yd (23 m)
EF0	A weak tornado snapped or uprooted numerous trees along its path.						
EF0	NW of Lincoln	Grafton	NH	44.08°N 71.72°W	19:32–19:33	0.2 mi (0.32 km)	20 yd (18 m)
EF0	A hiker on Mount Pemigewasset filmed a tornado moving along a nearby wooded hillside. No accessible damage was found.						
EF0	E of Brookhaven	Lincoln	MS	31.5662°N 90.3774°W	19:57–20:01	0.67 mi (1.08 km)	25 yd (23 m)
EF0	A weak tornado uprooted small trees and snapped large tree limbs. Two barns lost part of their sheet metal roofing, and two homes suffered minor roof damage as well.						
EF0	S of Pacific Junction	Mills	IA	41.01°N 95.80°W	22:00–22:02	0.25 mi (0.40 km)	50 yd (46 m)
EF0	The public reported a brief tornado. No damage occurred.						
EF0	SSW of Pilger	Stanton	NE	41.93°N 97.10°W	22:38–22:39	0.09 mi (0.14 km)	50 yd (46 m)
EF0	Tornado damaged tops of trees and scattered limbs across a nearby highway.						
EF0	NW of Lyons	Burt	NE	41.95°N 96.49°W	23:40–23:42	0.35 mi (0.56 km)	50 yd (46 m)
EF0	Damage to a small shed was reported.						

=== June 19 event ===
List of confirmed tornadoes – Tuesday, June 19, 2018
EF#	Location	County / Parish	State	Start Coord.	Time (UTC)	Path length	Max width
EF0	SE of Prospect Valley	Weld	CO	40.03°N 104.36°W	20:16–20:19	0.01 mi (0.016 km)	50 yd (46 m)
EF0	A rope tornado remained over open country, causing no damage.						
EF0	E of Iron Mountain	Laramie	WY	41.56°N 104.98°W	20:37	0.1 mi (0.16 km)	25 yd (23 m)
EF0	Tornado removed the roof off of an abandoned building along with knocking down fence line.						
EF0	ENE of Horse Creek	Laramie	WY	41.4758°N 104.9032°W	20:54	0.1 mi (0.16 km)	25 yd (23 m)
EF0	This small tornado remained over open country, causing no damage.						
EF0	SE of Huntley	Harlan	NE	40.172°N 99.2619°W	22:42–22:43	0.26 mi (0.42 km)	35 yd (32 m)
EF0	A multiple-vortex tornado was videoed by a storm chaser. No damage occurred.						
EF0	NNE of Limon	Lincoln	CO	39.35°N 103.65°W	22:48–22:49	0.01 mi (0.016 km)	50 yd (46 m)
EF0	A storm chaser reported a tornado. No damage occurred.						
EF0	E of Limon	Lincoln	CO	39.27°N 103.69°W	22:52–22:53	0.01 mi (0.016 km)	50 yd (46 m)
EF0	Emergency management reported a tornado. No damage occurred.						
EF0	ENE of Genoa	Lincoln	CO	39.31°N 103.41°W	23:11–23:12	0.01 mi (0.016 km)	50 yd (46 m)
EF0	A storm chaser reported a tornado. No damage occurred.						
EF0	S of La Junta	Otero	CO	37.9307°N 103.5487°W	23:51–23:53	0.74 mi (1.19 km)	30 yd (27 m)
EF0	This landspout tornado remained over open fields and caused no damage.						

=== June 20 event ===
List of confirmed tornadoes – Wednesday, June 20, 2018
EF#	Location	County / Parish	State	Start Coord.	Time (UTC)	Path length	Max width
EF0	W of Perry	Dallas, Boone	IA	41.8284°N 94.1545°W	19:18–19:29	2.78 mi (4.47 km)	100 yd (91 m)
EF0	A weak tornado skipped along an intermittent path, causing sporadic tree and crop damage. One home had some of its shingles removed as well.						
EF0	NW of Scranton	Greene	IA	42.0528°N 94.568°W	19:20–19:24	0.57 mi (0.92 km)	40 yd (37 m)
EF0	A trained storm spotter reported a tornado. No damage occurred.						
EF0	ESE of Delta	Keokuk	IA	41.3082°N 92.305°W	19:31–19:39	6.32 mi (10.17 km)	50 yd (46 m)
EF0	The only damage was to corn crops.						
EF0	E of Lanyon	Webster	IA	42.2165°N 94.1503°W	19:43–19:45	0.69 mi (1.11 km)	30 yd (27 m)
EF0	A trained storm spotter recorded a tornado that damaged crops.						
EF0	SE of Eldora	Hardin	IA	42.3439°N 93.0509°W	20:27–20:28	0.27 mi (0.43 km)	30 yd (27 m)
EF0	A tornado was photographed over agricultural land.						
EF0	SSW of Chillicothe	Wapello	IA	41.0139°N 92.6143°W	22:15–22:17	0.51 mi (0.82 km)	30 yd (27 m)
EF0	Trained storm spotters observed a tornado. No damage occurred.						

=== June 21 event ===
List of confirmed tornadoes – Thursday, June 21, 2018
EF#	Location	County / Parish	State	Start Coord.	Time (UTC)	Path length	Max width
EF0	N of Darlington	Butte	ID	43.8712°N 113.491°W	19:15–19:38	5.1 mi (8.2 km)	80 yd (73 m)
EF0	Several large tree limbs were downed and a few trees were uprooted. An RV camper was overturned, a home had part of its metal roof peeled back, and a garage had some of its trusses ripped off. A large section of barbed wire fencing was downed, including several metal fencing posts bent over or ripped out of the ground.						
EF0	WNW of Clarksville	McLean	IL	40.67°N 88.93°W	20:02–20:03	0.17 mi (0.27 km)	20 yd (18 m)
EF0	A trained storm spotter reported a brief tornado in an open field.						
EF0	SW of Canalou	Stoddard	MO	36.7199°N 89.8014°W	23:18–23:29	4.51 mi (7.26 km)	200 yd (180 m)
EF0	State police reported an intermittent tornado. No damage occurred.						

=== June 22 event ===
List of confirmed tornadoes – Friday, June 22, 2018
EF#	Location	County / Parish	State	Start Coord.	Time (UTC)	Path length	Max width
EF0	SSE of Van Wert	Van Wert	OH	40.7955°N 84.5452°W	22:51–22:55	1.05 mi (1.69 km)	180 yd (160 m)
EF0	A residence sustained some shingle damage and had a few large tree limbs downed.						
EF0	NW of Clayton	Union	NM	36.6573°N 103.4099°W	22:53–22:56	0.58 mi (0.93 km)	40 yd (37 m)
EF0	A fire department reported a tornado; no damage occurred.						
EF1	NE of Higdon	Jackson, DeKalb	AL	34.8513°N 85.6197°W	23:25–23:30	1.72 mi (2.77 km)	250 yd (230 m)
EF1	Several trees were snapped or uprooted. A metal roof was ripped off a home and tossed.						
EF2	W of West Point	Winston, Cullman	AL	34.2415°N 87.1344°W	23:46–00:12	7.02 mi (11.30 km)	260 yd (240 m)
EF2	A tornado began in extreme northeastern Winston County, snapping or uprooting several trees. The roof was ripped off of a large shed, and tin was peeled back from a few barns. The tornado continued into Cullman County, skipping along a path while inflicting extensive tree damage. It reached peak strength as a high-end EF2 west of West Point where it ripped a well-anchored manufactured home from its anchors and tossed it 20 yd (18 m), completely destroying the structure in the process. Three people were injured. More tree damage was observed before the tornado lifted.						
EF0	NE of La Fayette	Walker	GA	34.7521°N 85.2635°W	00:06–00:09	1.3 mi (2.1 km)	150 yd (140 m)
EF0	Two small barns suffered significant damage, and several trees were snapped or uprooted. A two-story home had a section of its roof shingles pulled up as well.						
EF0	NW of Balko	Beaver	OK	36.66°N 100.72°W	00:17	0.06 mi (0.097 km)	10 yd (9.1 m)
EF0	A trained storm spotter reported a brief tornado with no damage.						
EF0	NW of Wheeler	Wheeler	TX	35.448°N 100.299°W	03:21–03:22	0.53 mi (0.85 km)	50 yd (46 m)
EF0	One manufactured home was completely destroyed while four other houses suffered roof damage.						

=== June 23 event ===
List of confirmed tornadoes – Saturday, June 23, 2018
EF#	Location	County / Parish	State	Start Coord.	Time (UTC)	Path length	Max width
EF0	N of Highwood	Chouteau	MT	47.6277°N 110.8019°W	21:55–22:00	1.41 mi (2.27 km)	50 yd (46 m)
EF0	A non-mesocyclonic tornado was videoed by a storm chaser. No damage occurred.						
EF0	SE of Forestburg	Sanborn	SD	44°N 98.06°W	23:35–23:36	0.18 mi (0.29 km)	50 yd (46 m)
EF0	Crops suffered minimal damage.						
EF0	Calvert City	Marshall	KY	37.03°N 88.3418°W	02:08–02:09	0.52 mi (0.84 km)	20 yd (18 m)
EF0	A few tree limbs were downed.						

=== June 24 event ===
List of confirmed tornadoes – Sunday, June 24, 2018
EF#	Location	County / Parish	State	Start Coord.	Time (UTC)	Path length	Max width
EF0	WSW of Clark	Routt	CO	40.6782°N 107.0586°W	16:18–16:20	0.35 mi (0.56 km)	30 yd (27 m)
EF0	A high-elevation tornado was observed by many individuals.						
EF0	WSW of Coalmont	Jackson	CO	40.54°N 106.5°W	17:14–17:15	0.01 mi (0.016 km)	50 yd (46 m)
EF0	A trained storm spotter reported a brief tornado that caused no damage.						
EF0	ESE of Ada	Pontotoc	OK	34.74°N 96.62°W	20:12	0.2 mi (0.32 km)	10 yd (9.1 m)
EF0	Some trees were damaged.						
EF0	NE of Arco	Lincoln	MN	44.41°N 96.15°W	20:51–20:52	0.38 mi (0.61 km)	50 yd (46 m)
EF0	A tornado in an open field was widely photographed.						
EF0	SSW of Hammer	Roberts	SD	45.78°N 97.05°W	22:10–22:11	0.04 mi (0.064 km)	5 yd (4.6 m)
EF0	An emergency manager reported a brief tornado. No damage occurred.						
EF0	SE of Fairmont	Fillmore	NE	40.5966°N 97.5389°W	00:12–00:13	0.1 mi (0.16 km)	25 yd (23 m)
EF0	This is the first of four landspout tornadoes in close duration.						
EF0	E of Fairmont	Fillmore	NE	40.6153°N 97.5195°W	00:14–00:28	0.66 mi (1.06 km)	35 yd (32 m)
EF0	This is the second of four landspout tornadoes in close duration.						
EF0	SE of Fairmont	Fillmore	NE	40.5959°N 97.5297°W	00:17–00:20	0.2 mi (0.32 km)	25 yd (23 m)
EF0	This is the third of four landspout tornadoes in close duration.						
EF0	SW of Fairmont	Fillmore	NE	40.5981°N 97.6136°W	00:43–00:50	0.68 mi (1.09 km)	35 yd (32 m)
EF0	This is the final of four landspout tornadoes in close duration.						

=== June 25 event ===
List of confirmed tornadoes – Monday, June 25, 2018
EF#	Location	County / Parish	State	Start Coord.	Time (UTC)	Path length	Max width
EF1	WSW of Beaver Dam	Ohio	KY	37.3849°N 86.9283°W	15:50–15:51	0.6 mi (0.97 km)	100 yd (91 m)
EF1	At least two dozen trees were snapped or uprooted. A brick home had a large portion of its roof ripped off, while a large two-story industrial structure had around a quarter of its metal roof peeled off.						
EF0	NE of Bee Spring	Edmonson	KY	37.322°N 86.2472°W	17:04–17:06	1.6 mi (2.6 km)	50 yd (46 m)
EF0	A weak tornado skipped along its path, snapping some trees before crossing Nolin Lake as a waterspout.						
EF0	Delphos	Ringgold	IA	40.6618°N 94.3381°W	22:14–22:16	0.73 mi (1.17 km)	40 yd (37 m)
EF0	Tree debris was tossed.						

=== June 26 event ===
List of confirmed tornadoes – Tuesday, June 26, 2018
EF#	Location	County / Parish	State	Start Coord.	Time (UTC)	Path length	Max width
EF0	SW of Norris City	White	IL	37.9334°N 88.3673°W	14:41–14:42	0.71 mi (1.14 km)	100 yd (91 m)
EF0	Dozens of trees were snapped or uprooted.						
EF0	WSW of Georgetown	Grant	WI	42.62°N 90.51°W	15:42–15:43	0.09 mi (0.14 km)	10 yd (9.1 m)
EF0	A tornado was caught on video. It remained over open country and caused no damage.						
EF0	S of Rewey	Lafayette	WI	42.7752°N 90.4105°W	16:30–16:33	0.5 mi (0.80 km)	40 yd (37 m)
EF0	Crops were damaged by this brief tornado.						
EF1	Pewee Valley	Jefferson, Oldham	KY	38.3062°N 85.5303°W	17:44–17:49	3.52 mi (5.66 km)	150 yd (140 m)
EF1	This tornado touched down in the northeastern suburbs of Louisville, snapping or uprooting numerous trees, some of which landed on homes. The Westport Business Center sustained significant roof damage, with debris scattered up to 50 yd (46 m) downwind. Another business had one of its exterior walls pushed out, and an air conditioning unit was tossed. A trampoline was thrown 60 yd (55 m) as well.						
EF0	Lake Lotawana	Jackson	MO	38.9477°N 94.308°W	18:09–18:16	3.39 mi (5.46 km)	100 yd (91 m)
EF0	Two homes suffered minor roof damage, and numerous tree limbs were snapped. A wooden power pole was snapped, and docks were damaged along the lake.						
EF0	WNW of Argyle	Lafayette	WI	42.6984°N 89.8875°W	19:24–19:33	1.79 mi (2.88 km)	47 yd (43 m)
EF0	Crops were damaged, along with a couple of sheds.						
EF0	N of Memphis	Scotland	MO	40.4791°N 92.1659°W	20:26–20:28	0.18 mi (0.29 km)	10 yd (9.1 m)
EF0	An empty grain bin was tossed 200 yd (180 m) into a pond.						
EF1	NW of Osceola	St. Clair	MO	38.0654°N 93.8217°W	20:30–20:35	2.48 mi (3.99 km)	200 yd (180 m)
EF1	Large trees were snapped and uprooted.						
EF0	SSE of Maple Park	Kane	IL	41.8497°N 88.5735°W	22:28	0.01 mi (0.016 km)	20 yd (18 m)
EF0	A brief tornado remained over an open field, causing no damage.						
EF0	NW of El Dorado	Butler	KS	37.92°N 96.91°W	23:39–23:41	1.89 mi (3.04 km)	100 yd (91 m)
EF0	A brief tornado remained over open country, causing no damage.						
EF0	N of El Dorado	Butler	KS	37.9024°N 96.8609°W	23:42–23:44	0.47 mi (0.76 km)	50 yd (46 m)
EF0	A brief tornado remained over open country, causing no damage.						
EF0	SE of Manhattan	Will	IL	41.3799°N 87.9579°W	23:53–23:54	0.1 mi (0.16 km)	25 yd (23 m)
EF0	This tornado remained over open country, causing no damage.						
EF1	Manhattan	Will	IL	41.4102°N 87.9857°W	23:54–23:59	1.12 mi (1.80 km)	100 yd (91 m)
EF1	This tornado moved through Manhattan, where several buildings in town suffered generally minor damage to shingles and windows, although the post office lost a portion of its roof. Numerous trees were snapped or uprooted as well.						
EF3	Eureka	Greenwood	KS	37.8115°N 96.3084°W	00:18–00:29	9.15 mi (14.73 km)	500 yd (460 m)
EF3	A strong tornado directly impacted Eureka, damaging or destroying 175 structures. Many homes were damaged, including several that had their roofs ripped off, sustained collapse of exterior walls, or were shifted off of their foundations. A well-built house at the northeastern edge of town was left with only interior rooms standing, and a large metal building was destroyed nearby. A tire shop was destroyed, other businesses were damaged, and Eureka High School sustained significant damage to its athletic field. Vehicles were moved and flipped, garages were destroyed, and many trees and power lines were downed throughout the town. Eight people were injured, two critically. Damage totaled $13.6 million.						
EF0	NW of Kewanee	Henry	IL	41.3169°N 90.011°W	01:23–01:24	0.01 mi (0.016 km)	10 yd (9.1 m)
EF0	A farm implement was overturned and corn crops were flattened.						
EF1	E of Rantoul	Champaign	IL	40.2725°N 88.1022°W	01:27–01:35	3.88 mi (6.24 km)	75 yd (69 m)
EF1	A tornado damaged many trees, including one that fell on a car. The roofs of two large sheds, two garages, and an old barn were damaged.						
EF0	N of Glen Ullin	Morton	ND	46.8258°N 101.8322°W	01:53–01:54	0.07 mi (0.11 km)	50 yd (46 m)
EF0	The public reported a brief tornado. No damage occurred.						
EF0	N of Douglass	Butler	KS	37.5688°N 97.019°W	02:02–02:04	0.54 mi (0.87 km)	50 yd (46 m)
EF0	A storm chaser reported a tornado.						

=== June 27 event ===
List of confirmed tornadoes – Wednesday, June 27, 2018
EF#	Location	County / Parish	State	Start Coord.	Time (UTC)	Path length	Max width
EF0	SW of Morgantown	Monongalia	WV	39.543°N 79.875°W	21:42–21:43	0.21 mi (0.34 km)	60 yd (55 m)
EF0	A weak tornado caused roof damage to four structures. A support beam to a covered porch was blown out at a residence, a utility pole was ripped loose, and 10 trees were snapped or uprooted.						
EF0	Hempfield Township to Mount Pleasant Township	Westmoreland	PA	40.205°N 79.560°W	00:02–00:10	2.42 mi (3.89 km)	150 yd (140 m)
EF0	A barn and an outbuilding had portions of their roofs ripped off, and a heavy dairy condenser unit was lifted and tossed. Numerous trees were snapped or uprooted, and a wooden fence was destroyed.						
EF0	Unity Township	Westmoreland	PA	40.257°N 79.417°W	00:20–00:23	0.7 mi (1.1 km)	175 yd (160 m)
EF0	Several homes sustained minimal damage. A barn lost a large section of its roof, and nearby trees were damaged.						
EF0	SE of Jackson	Jackson	OH	38.9889°N 82.5794°W	00:50–00:51	0.5 mi (0.80 km)	30 yd (27 m)
EF0	A tornado touched down at the James A Rhodes Airport, bending a 60 ft (18 m) length of metal roofing along the top of an overhead door of an aircraft hangar. Another overhead door on the opposite side of the hangar was pushed outward. A single engine aircraft was pushed 30 ft (9.1 m) and flipped onto a vehicle, while another single engine aircraft had its landing gear collapsed and was pushed 60 ft (18 m) onto the nearby lawn. Several large trees were snapped as well.						
EF1	Piketown	Dauphin	PA	40.3868°N 76.7529°W	04:45–04:47	1.56 mi (2.51 km)	100 yd (91 m)
EF1	Hundreds of trees were snapped or uprooted. Falling trees damaged the roofs of four homes and several sheds.						

=== June 28 event ===
List of confirmed tornadoes – Thursday, June 28, 2018
EF#	Location	County / Parish	State	Start Coord.	Time (UTC)	Path length	Max width
EF1	ESE of Centerville	Hickman	TN	35.7278°N 87.3205°W	17:36–17:38	2.45 mi (3.94 km)	75 yd (69 m)
EF1	A tornado snapped or downed numerous trees and destroyed several outbuildings. One very poorly constructed home was shifted off its foundation and destroyed, with most debris landing in the basement of the structure. Other homes suffered roof damage as well.						
EF1	S of Ranum	Norman	MN	47.46°N 96.13°W	19:51–19:54	1 mi (1.6 km)	150 yd (140 m)
EF1	One tree and one wooden power pole were snapped.						
EF0	NNW of Elsah	Jersey	IL	38.9829°N 90.373°W	22:11–22:13	1.4 mi (2.3 km)	50 yd (46 m)
EF0	An outbuilding had a portion of its roof removed, a road sign was twisted, and several trees were snapped.						
EF0	E of Johnston City	Williamson	IL	37.82°N 88.9117°W	00:12–00:13	0.3 mi (0.48 km)	75 yd (69 m)
EF0	Several shingles were blown off a house, numerous trees were snapped, and two garage buildings were blown off their foundations. A wooden power pole was snapped at its base after a tree fell onto it.						
EF0	W of Capitol	Carter	MT	45.3219°N 104.4806°W	01:17–01:35	10 mi (16 km)	50 yd (46 m)
EF0	A short-lived tornado remained over open fields, causing no damage.						
EF0	SW of Capitol	Carter	MT	45.3503°N 104.2066°W	01:44–01:50	4 mi (6.4 km)	50 yd (46 m)
EF0	This tornado remained over very rural areas and caused no damage.						
EF0	SSW of Capitol	Carter	MT	45.3675°N 104.0981°W	02:01	0.01 mi (0.016 km)	25 yd (23 m)
EF0	An anticyclonic tornado caused no damage.						
EF3	S of Capitol, MT to S of Camp Crook, SD	Carter (MT), Harding (SD)	MT, SD	45.3753°N 104.0813°W	02:06–02:30	10.19 mi (16.40 km)	900 yd (820 m)
EF3	A large and strong tornado destroyed a house, removing its roof and exterior walls. A five-ton tractor that originated in South Dakota was later recovered in pieces across the state line in Montana, more than a mile-and-a-half away from where it originated. Other pieces of farm machinery were lofted and thrown, heavy hay bales were moved, and several vehicles were lofted from a property and never recovered. Sheds and outbuildings were completely destroyed, including one that was obliterated and had its foundation removed from the ground and broken into pieces. Several hundred yards of fencing was flattened, and numerous trees were snapped or uprooted, including some that sustained denuding and debarking. Numerous deer were killed as well.						
EF2	SSE of Camp Crook	Harding	SD	45.4259°N 103.9053°W	02:30–02:38	2.3 mi (3.7 km)	100 yd (91 m)
EF2	This tornado remained mainly over open country, though one house sustained significant damage.						
EFU	SE of Camp Crook	Harding	SD	45.478°N 103.8812°W	02:43–02:57	2.69 mi (4.33 km)	200 yd (180 m)
EFU	This tornado remained over open country, causing no damage.						
EF2	ENE of Camp Crook	Harding	SD	45.5562°N 103.7596°W	03:10–03:26	7.05 mi (11.35 km)	300 yd (270 m)
EF2	A farm outbuilding was severely damaged, sustaining collapse of most of its exterior walls. Trees and power poles were snapped as well.						

=== June 29 event ===
List of confirmed tornadoes – Friday, June 29, 2018
EF#	Location	County / Parish	State	Start Coord.	Time (UTC)	Path length	Max width
EF1	N of Northwood	Grand Forks	ND	47.81°N 97.57°W	08:55–08:58	1.82 mi (2.93 km)	200 yd (180 m)
EF1	Extreme tree damage was observed, and three cattle trailers were overblown at a farmstead.						
EF1	N of Twin Valley	Norman	MN	47.27°N 96.26°W	09:48–09:50	1.21 mi (1.95 km)	150 yd (140 m)
EF1	A tornado wrapped in downburst winds snapped several large trees and tore metal roofing off of a shed.						
EF2	W of Winger to ESE of Fosston	Polk	MN	47.55°N 96.02°W	09:54–10:09	15.38 mi (24.75 km)	400 yd (370 m)
EF2	A strong tornado wrapped in downburst winds snapped and uprooted large trees in numerous shelter belts and groves. Several homes and farm buildings had their roofing ripped off. Nearly 11 mi (18 km) of twin tower high voltage power lines, including over 50 tower sets, were snapped, crumpled, or bent. Wooden power poles were snapped as well.						
EF1	SE of Erskine	Polk	MN	47.64°N 96°W	09:56–09:59	2.5 mi (4.0 km)	250 yd (230 m)
EF1	A shop building had its back wall and overhead doors blown out. Tree damage occurred at a homestead as well. This tornado was wrapped in downburst winds.						
EF0	NE of Tampa	Hillsborough	FL	28.0124°N 82.3923°W	15:14–15:15	0.22 mi (0.35 km)	25 yd (23 m)
EF0	A two-story apartment building had a portion of its roof removed.						
EF1	SE of Sundance, WY to W of Lead, SD	Crook (WY), Lawrence (SD)	WY, SD	44.3206°N 104.287°W	22:05–22:30	18.72 mi (30.13 km)	200 yd (180 m)
EF1	This tornado moved through Spearfish Canyon and surrounding wooded areas, snapping and uprooting numerous trees. Homes and outbuildings sustained minor structural damage occurred as well.						

=== June 30 event ===
List of confirmed tornadoes – Saturday, June 30, 2018
EF#	Location	County / Parish	State	Start Coord.	Time (UTC)	Path length	Max width
EF0	SE of Holdrege	Phelps	NE	40.3624°N 99.3105°W	20:40	0.01 mi (0.016 km)	50 yd (46 m)
EF0	Multiple people observed a tornado in the West Sacramento Wildlife Management Area. No damage occurred.						
EF0	SE of Funk	Phelps	NE	40.3999°N 99.2125°W	21:02–21:03	0.45 mi (0.72 km)	50 yd (46 m)
EF0	Video evidence confirmed a tornado. No damage occurred.						
EF0	NE of Milligan	Saline	NE	40.5373°N 97.3115°W	23:10–23:12	0.8 mi (1.3 km)	50 yd (46 m)
EF0	A shed sustained minor roof damage and had its doors blown out.						
EF1	NE of Milligan	Saline	NE	40.5384°N 97.2866°W	23:12–23:14	1.4 mi (2.3 km)	200 yd (180 m)
EF1	One storage shed was moved over 1,000 ft (300 m) while a second had metal panels blown off. Large tree limbs were snapped.						
EF0	WSW of McLouth	Jefferson	KS	39.183°N 95.257°W	04:11–04:12	0.17 mi (0.27 km)	40 yd (37 m)
EF0	Several older outbuildings were damaged, and a 2x4 piece of wood was impaled into the siding of a home.						
EF0	N of Western	Saline	NE	40.4558°N 97.2196°W	05:19–05:20	0.24 mi (0.39 km)	20 yd (18 m)
EF0	One shed had its roof panels ripped off while a second saw some of its walls collapsed. Corn was flattened.						

== July ==
Confirmed tornadoes by Enhanced Fujita rating
EFU	EF0	EF1	EF2	EF3	EF4	EF5	Total
1	57	24	6	3	0	0	91

=== July 4 event ===
List of confirmed tornadoes – Wednesday, July 4, 2018
EF#	Location	County / Parish	State	Start Coord.	Time (UTC)	Path length	Max width
EF2	Eastern Warwick	Eddy, Benson	ND	47.83°N 98.72°W	07:29–07:32	3.12 mi (5.02 km)	400 yd (370 m)
EF2	A low-end EF2 tornado embedded in downburst winds affected the eastern edge of Warwick, snapping multiple power poles and trees. Service buildings had their siding and roofing panels ripped off.						
EF1	NW of Lawton	Ramsey	ND	48.32°N 98.48°W	08:20–08:21	1 mi (1.6 km)	150 yd (140 m)
EF1	A tornado embedded in downburst winds moved through a farmstead, demolishing an old barn and tossing pieces of the structure over 200 yd (180 m). A piece of wood was impaled into the side of a home about 80 yd (73 m) away, and a wooden power pole was cracked. A wind sensor along the tornado's path recorded a gust to 68 mph (109 km/h).						
EF1	Bemidji	Beltrami	MN	47.49°N 94.88°W	11:18	0.7 mi (1.1 km)	200 yd (180 m)
EF1	A garage was lifted off its foundation, the roofs and windows of several homes in town were damaged, and many trees were snapped or uprooted.						
EF0	W of Hutto	Williamson	TX	30.5615°N 97.5903°W	19:25–19:27	0.7 mi (1.1 km)	20 yd (18 m)
EF0	A brief landspout tornado was caught on video. No damage occurred.						
EF0	Tavares	Lake	FL	28.8173°N 81.7224°W	18:30–18:35	0.99 mi (1.59 km)	75 yd (69 m)
EF0	A restaurant sustained roof and sign damage, and a metal storage building was destroyed. Trees and power lines were downed as well.						

=== July 5 event ===
List of confirmed tornadoes – Thursday, July 5, 2018
EF#	Location	County / Parish	State	Start Coord.	Time (UTC)	Path length	Max width
EF0	N of Juno Beach	Palm Beach	FL	26.8911°N 80.0563°W	14:59–15:00	0.02 mi (0.032 km)	15 yd (14 m)
EF0	Multiple sources observed a waterspout move ashore at Juno Beach before lifting. No damage occurred.						
EF0	W of Hartsel	Park	CO	39°N 106.02°W	19:29	0.01 mi (0.016 km)	50 yd (46 m)
EF0	A park ranger reported a brief tornado that caused no damage.						

=== July 8 event ===
List of confirmed tornadoes – Sunday, July 8, 2018
EF#	Location	County / Parish	State	Start Coord.	Time (UTC)	Path length	Max width
EF0	Black Lake	Cameron	LA	30.02°N 93.48°W	22:59–23:00	0.09 mi (0.14 km)	10 yd (9.1 m)
EF0	A sheriff's office relayed a report of a waterspout that caused no damage.						
EF1	Milnor	Sargent	ND	46.26°N 97.46°W	23:46–23:49	1.9 mi (3.1 km)	100 yd (91 m)
EF1	Trees and tree limbs were snapped in and around Milnor, and the roof of a large farm shed was damaged.						

=== July 9 event ===
List of confirmed tornadoes – Monday July 9, 2018
EF#	Location	County / Parish	State	Start Coord.	Time (UTC)	Path length	Max width
EF0	Toledo Bend Reservoir	Sabine	TX	31.4526°N 93.7545°W	15:04–15:05	0.25 mi (0.40 km)	30 yd (27 m)
EF0	A brief waterspout was photographed.						
EF1	Southeastern Plentywood	Sheridan	MT	48.7702°N 104.5307°W	01:05–01:09	2.1 mi (3.4 km)	250 yd (230 m)
EF1	An outbuilding and a single-wide mobile home were destroyed.						
EF2	Southern Watford City	McKenzie	ND	47.7814°N 103.295°W	05:45–05:48	0.53 mi (0.85 km)	400 yd (370 m)
EF2	1 death – This brief but strong tornado struck the Prairie View RV Park on the south side of Watford City. A total of 122 trailers, RVs, manufactured homes, and other buildings were destroyed, while 80 others were damaged. Trees and power poles were snapped, and a large storage shed was flattened. In addition to the death of a newborn baby, 28 people were injured, nine critically. Damage totaled $3.5 million.						

=== July 10 event ===
List of confirmed tornadoes – Tuesday, July 10, 2018
EF#	Location	County / Parish	State	Start Coord.	Time (UTC)	Path length	Max width
EF0	WNW of Pennsuco	Broward	FL	25.99°N 80.54°W	21:47–22:01	4.66 mi (7.50 km)	25 yd (23 m)
EF0	A tornado was photographed in the area but caused no damage.						

=== July 11 event ===
List of confirmed tornadoes – Wednesday, July 11, 2018
EF#	Location	County / Parish	State	Start Coord.	Time (UTC)	Path length	Max width
EF0	W of Ponemah	Beltrami	MN	48.02°N 94.98°W	02:12–02:15	1.75 mi (2.82 km)	250 yd (230 m)
EF0	A waterspout began over Lower Red Lake, moving onshore and snapping tree limbs before dissipating.						
EF1	NE of Ponemah	Beltrami	MN	48.05°N 94.85°W	02:24–02:28	2 mi (3.2 km)	400 yd (370 m)
EF1	Trees were downed along the path.						
EF1	NW of Saum	Beltrami	MN	47.99°N 94.75°W	02:31–02:42	5 mi (8.0 km)	400 yd (370 m)
EF1	A waterspout began over Lower Red Lake, moving onshore and snapping or uprooted trees before dissipating.						

=== July 12 event ===
List of confirmed tornadoes – Thursday, July 12, 2018
EF#	Location	County / Parish	State	Start Coord.	Time (UTC)	Path length	Max width
EF0	Pueblo West	Pueblo	CO	38.36°N 104.72°W	20:15–20:20	0.08 mi (0.13 km)	30 yd (27 m)
EF0	A landspout tornado was observed by a resident and an NWS employee.						

=== July 13 event ===
List of confirmed tornadoes – Friday, July 13, 2018
EF#	Location	County / Parish	State	Start Coord.	Time (UTC)	Path length	Max width
EF0	SSW of Syracuse	Hamilton	KS	37.7853°N 101.9059°W	01:20–01:30	2.9 mi (4.7 km)	50 yd (46 m)
EF0	A storm chaser reported a landspout tornado.						

=== July 14 event ===
List of confirmed tornadoes – Saturday, July 14, 2018
EF#	Location	County / Parish	State	Start Coord.	Time (UTC)	Path length	Max width
EF1	ESE of Dodge	Dunn	ND	47.3047°N 102.1931°W	21:12–21:17	0.33 mi (0.53 km)	100 yd (91 m)
EF1	Two outbuildings were destroyed and trees were snapped.						
EF0	S of Dodge	Dunn	ND	47.24°N 102.19°W	21:26–21:39	1.01 mi (1.63 km)	300 yd (270 m)
EF0	About 35 hay bales were tossed.						

=== July 17 event ===
List of confirmed tornadoes – Tuesday, July 17, 2018
EF#	Location	County / Parish	State	Start Coord.	Time (UTC)	Path length	Max width
EF0	Eastern Ashford	Windham	CT	41.8986°N 72.1347°W	20:00–20:01	0.43 mi (0.69 km)	225 yd (206 m)
EF0	Numerous large trees were snapped or uprooted, and a house sustained minor shingle damage.						

=== July 18 event ===
List of confirmed tornadoes – Wednesday, July 18, 2018
EF#	Location	County / Parish	State	Start Coord.	Time (UTC)	Path length	Max width
EF0	N of St. Lawrence	Hand	SD	44.66°N 98.94°W	22:21–22:22	0.15 mi (0.24 km)	10 yd (9.1 m)
EF0	The public reported a brief tornado in an open field.						
EF1	NNE of Hamill	Tripp	SD	43.6738°N 99.644°W	00:35–00:36	0.21 mi (0.34 km)	20 yd (18 m)
EF1	An irrigation pivot system was overturned and damaged.						

=== July 19 event ===
List of confirmed tornadoes – Thursday, July 19, 2018
EF#	Location	County / Parish	State	Start Coord.	Time (UTC)	Path length	Max width
EF0	WNW of Ceylon	Martin	MN	43.54°N 94.67°W	17:45–17:56	0.21 mi (0.34 km)	10 yd (9.1 m)
EF0	A tornado was reported in the area with trees downed.						
EF0	S of Clarion (1st tornado)	Wright	IA	42.6457°N 93.7965°W	19:30–19:37	3.5 mi (5.6 km)	80 yd (73 m)
EF0	A tornado damaged crops.						
EF0	S of Clarion (2nd tornado)	Wright	IA	42.5791°N 93.7789°W	19:35–19:47	4.43 mi (7.13 km)	80 yd (73 m)
EF0	A tornado was photographed to the south of Clarion. Only crop damage occurred.						
EF0	NE of Woolstock	Wright	IA	42.5806°N 93.7128°W	19:42–19:45	1.28 mi (2.06 km)	60 yd (55 m)
EF0	High-resolution satellite imagery confirmed a tornado over agricultural areas.						
EF0	Northeastern Ankeny	Polk	IA	41.7394°N 93.5732°W	19:48–19:49	0.88 mi (1.42 km)	50 yd (46 m)
EF0	Several trees, fencing, and pieces of playground equipment were damaged by this weak tornado.						
EF2	N of Bondurant	Polk	IA	41.7246°N 93.4951°W	19:50–20:02	3.68 mi (5.92 km)	130 yd (120 m)
EF2	This low-end EF2 tornado occurred simultaneously with the tornado below. A well-built metal outbuilding had most of its roof removed and sustained the collapse of two walls. Numerous trees were snapped or uprooted, and severe crop damage occurred along the path.						
EF2	Bondurant	Polk	IA	41.7008°N 93.5037°W	19:51–20:00	2.95 mi (4.75 km)	100 yd (91 m)
EF2	This low-end EF2 tornado, which developed as a twin to the tornado above, moved through residential areas in Bondurant. One home had its second story blown off, a few homes had major roof damage, and other homes sustained less severe damage. An unanchored detached garage was swept away, and vehicles were overturned as well.						
EF0	W of Story City	Story	IA	42.1727°N 93.6592°W	19:52–19:57	2.07 mi (3.33 km)	40 yd (37 m)
EF0	This rope tornado remained over open country, causing only crop damage.						
EF0	N of Blairsburg	Hamilton	IA	42.4887°N 93.656°W	19:56–20:05	2.67 mi (4.30 km)	60 yd (55 m)
EF0	A weak tornado north of Blairsburg damaged crops.						
EF0	NW of Prairie City	Jasper	IA	41.6293°N 93.334°W	20:18–20:24	2.35 mi (3.78 km)	60 yd (55 m)
EF0	This was the first tornado produced by the Pella supercell. It remained over open farm fields, causing no damage.						
EF0	NE of Roland	Story	IA	42.1789°N 93.4856°W	20:22–20:30	2.79 mi (4.49 km)	60 yd (55 m)
EF0	High-resolution satellite imagery confirmed a tornado with damage to crops.						
EF0	SE of Prairie City	Jasper	IA	41.573°N 93.2186°W	20:28–20:34	2.62 mi (4.22 km)	80 yd (73 m)
EF0	This was the second tornado produced by the Pella supercell. Crops and trees were damaged along the path.						
EF0	NE of Collins	Story	IA	41.9202°N 93.3002°W	20:35–20:40	2.48 mi (3.99 km)	40 yd (37 m)
EF0	High-resolution satellite imagery confirmed a tornado with damage to crops.						
EF1	E of Monroe	Jasper, Marion	IA	41.5286°N 93.0643°W	20:45–20:52	3.96 mi (6.37 km)	500 yd (460 m)
EF1	This was the third tornado produced by the Pella supercell. A machine shed lost a small part of its roof, and trees and crops were damaged.						
EF0	E of Otley	Marion	IA	41.4752°N 92.9801°W	20:56–20:58	0.99 mi (1.59 km)	40 yd (37 m)
EF0	A brief tornado caused little to no damage.						
EF3	Eastern Pella	Marion	IA	41.4602°N 92.9371°W	21:01–21:24	9.17 mi (14.76 km)	800 yd (730 m)
EF3	The fourth produced by the Pella supercell, this intense cone tornado clipped the eastern edge of Pella, causing major structural damage to large factory buildings at the Vermeer plant complex, where a celebration for the company's 70th anniversary was being held. Reinforced masonry exterior walls were bowed in and collapsed at this location, metal support beams were severely bent, and large amounts of roofing was peeled from the buildings and scattered. Numerous vehicles, semi-trailers, and pieces of machinery were thrown and mangled at the plant, some of which were found piled atop each other and wrapped in sheet metal. Outside of town, barns were destroyed and a wide swath of corn was flattened in farm fields. A two-story farm home was shifted off of its foundation, and an addition to the south side of the house was destroyed. A few other homes sustained less severe damage. Thirteen people were injured.						
EF0	E of Clemons	Marshall	IA	42.1045°N 93.1332°W	21:11–21:13	0.85 mi (1.37 km)	40 yd (37 m)
EF0	High-resolution satellite imagery confirmed a tornado with damage to crops. The same storm produced the EF3 Marshalltown tornado.						
EF0	NE of Pella	Mahaska	IA	41.4188°N 92.8571°W	21:15–21:18	1.16 mi (1.87 km)	60 yd (55 m)
EF0	A satellite tornado to the Pella EF3 tornado damaged crops. This was the fifth tornado produced by the Pella supercell.						
EF3	W of Marietta to Marshalltown	Marshall	IA	42.0829°N 93.0275°W	21:24–21:47	8.41 mi (13.53 km)	1,200 yd (1,100 m)
EF3	See section on this tornado – There were 22 direct injuries and one indirect injury.						
EF0	S of Oskaloosa	Mahaska	IA	41.2285°N 92.6102°W	21:50–21:53	1.24 mi (2.00 km)	60 yd (55 m)
EF0	High-resolution satellite imagery confirmed a tornado with damage to crops. This was the sixth tornado produced by the Pella supercell.						
EF1	NNE of Keosauqua (1st tornado)	Van Buren	IA	40.803°N 91.9699°W	23:07–23:15	2.14 mi (3.44 km)	50 yd (46 m)
EF1	Twin tornadoes formed near Keosauqua, with this being the first one. A large historic stone barn was destroyed. Trees, a cornfield, and a small farm outbuilding were damaged. This was the seventh tornado produced by the Pella supercell.						
EF1	NNE of Keosauqua (2nd tornado)	Van Buren	IA	40.7482°N 91.9567°W	23:09–23:11	0.19 mi (0.31 km)	75 yd (69 m)
EF1	Twin tornadoes formed near Keosauqua, with this being the second one. Several large farm outbuildings and equipment were destroyed. Corn crops were damaged. This was the final tornado produced by the Pella supercell.						

=== July 20 event ===
List of confirmed tornadoes – Friday, July 20, 2018
EF#	Location	County / Parish	State	Start Coord.	Time (UTC)	Path length	Max width
EF0	NW of Camdenton	Camden	MO	38.07°N 92.87°W	09:32–09:33	0.12 mi (0.19 km)	75 yd (69 m)
EF0	Numerous trees were uprooted and tree limbs were snapped. Power lines were downed as well.						
EF0	SW of Bremen	Marshall	IN	41.3823°N 86.2197°W	17:53–17:55	0.5 mi (0.80 km)	50 yd (46 m)
EF0	A barn sustained damage to its cinder block exterior wall, corn was flattened, and some tree branches were broken.						
EF0	WNW of Wautoma	Waushara	WI	44.0624°N 89.2517°W	17:55–17:56	0.08 mi (0.13 km)	10 yd (9.1 m)
EF0	A small tornado snapped branches off of several pine trees and tossed them into the air.						
EF0	N of Salem	Washington	IN	38.6336°N 86.1095°W	18:03–18:05	1.1 mi (1.8 km)	75 yd (69 m)
EF0	A weak and intermittent tornado downed a few tree limbs and small fences. Multiple metal roof panels were ripped from a barn, while its overhead garage doors were blown in and the entrance door was ripped off. A house sustained considerable damage to its siding and roof, a small play shed was destroyed, and corn was flattened in a field.						
EF1	S of Corydon	Harrison	IN	38.1527°N 86.1501°W	18:04–18:20	6 mi (9.7 km)	250 yd (230 m)
EF1	A multiple-vortex tornado impaled a wooden two-by-eight plank into a concrete grain silo, extensively damaged four large barns, and caused significant tree damage. One tree fell on a garage, several homes sustained substantial roof damage, a pole barn was completely destroyed, and a truck and horse trailer was twisted and moved 50 ft (15 m). Corn crops were flattened, a camper was tossed and flipped over, and single-wide trailers were flipped over as well.						
EF0	N of La Fontaine	Wabash	IN	40.7281°N 85.7180°W	19:14–19:15	0.8 mi (1.3 km)	25 yd (23 m)
EF0	A brief tornado ripped the roof from an outbuilding and snapped or uprooted trees.						
EF1	Moonville	Madison	IN	40.1954°N 85.6115°W	19:50–19:52	0.6 mi (0.97 km)	30 yd (27 m)
EF1	A barn was destroyed, a storage shed was flipped onto its side, and trees in town were damaged.						
EF0	ESE of Sweetwater	Miami-Dade	FL	25.7608°N 80.3623°W	20:22–20:24	0.19 mi (0.31 km)	20 yd (18 m)
EF0	Trees, mailboxes, street signs, canopies, and basketball hoops all sustained minor damage from a brief tornado that eventually became a waterspout over a large retention pond before lifting.						
EF0	SE of Edmonton	Metcalfe	KY	36.9614°N 85.5931°W	23:03–23:05	2.1 mi (3.4 km)	60 yd (55 m)
EF0	A carport was overturned and two metal outbuildings lost roofing material. A double-wide mobile home was shifted off its foundation, with its windows broken and shingles ripped from the roof. Numerous trees were snapped.						
EF1	NE of Priceville	Hart	KY	37.39°N 85.9443°W	02:56–02:59	1.2 mi (1.9 km)	60 yd (55 m)
EF1	A large barn and several large hay bales were destroyed. Numerous trees were snapped along the path.						

=== July 21 event ===
List of confirmed tornadoes – Saturday, July 21, 2018
EF#	Location	County / Parish	State	Start Coord.	Time (UTC)	Path length	Max width
EF0	SE of Opelika	Lee	AL	32.6488°N 85.3701°W	22:43–23:01	5.73 mi (9.22 km)	500 yd (460 m)
EF0	Several trees were snapped or uprooted. Approximately 30 structures suffered damage from falling trees, and a few cars were crushed as well. Shingles were blown off various units of an apartment complex, and a camper was rolled onto its side.						

=== July 22 event ===
List of confirmed tornadoes – Sunday, July 22, 2018
EF#	Location	County / Parish	State	Start Coord.	Time (UTC)	Path length	Max width
EF0	Heidelberg Township	Lehigh	PA	40.7074°N 75.6665°W	22:26–22:30	0.81 mi (1.30 km)	20 yd (18 m)
EF0	A barn sustained damage to its metal roofing. Corn fields and trees were damaged as well.						

=== July 23 event ===
List of confirmed tornadoes – Monday, July 23, 2018
EF#	Location	County / Parish	State	Start Coord.	Time (UTC)	Path length	Max width
EF0	Myrtle Beach	Horry	SC	33.69°N 78.88°W	17:25–17:35	0.06 mi (0.097 km)	15 yd (14 m)
EF0	A well-documented waterspout moved onto Myrtle Beach and dissipated without causing damage.						
EF1	E of Morris Township	Tioga	PA	41.5634°N 77.2279°W	18:15–18:20	2.12 mi (3.41 km)	100 yd (91 m)
EF1	Approximately 200 trees were downed. A large pole shed had its roof removed while a barn saw its roof damaged.						
EF0	NNW of Vilano Beach	St. Johns	FL	30.05°N 81.37°W	18:40	0.01 mi (0.016 km)	25 yd (23 m)
EF0	Two roofs were damaged, a few homes suffered minor damage to their soffits, and a fence was blown down. Several trees were snapped or uprooted.						
EF0	W of Hartsel	Park	CO	39.0°N 105.8°W	21:46–21:47	0.01 mi (0.016 km)	50 yd (46 m)
EF0	The public documented a tornado over open land. No damage occurred.						

=== July 24 event ===
List of confirmed tornadoes – Tuesday, July 24, 2018
EF#	Location	County / Parish	State	Start Coord.	Time (UTC)	Path length	Max width
EF0	Lincolnia	Fairfax	VA	38.819°N 77.1697°W	09:54–09:55	0.21 mi (0.34 km)	100 yd (91 m)
EF0	A weak tornado touched down at Thomas Jefferson High School, damaging fences, two sheds, light poles, and several trees. A shipping container was tossed over 100 yd (91 m).						

=== July 25 event ===
List of confirmed tornadoes – Wednesday, July 25, 2018
EF#	Location	County / Parish	State	Start Coord.	Time (UTC)	Path length	Max width
EF0	Flagler Beach	Flagler	FL	29.5°N 81.14°W	18:44	0.01 mi (0.016 km)	25 yd (23 m)
EF0	A weak tornado began in Flagler Beach, quickly moving over water as a waterspout before dissipating. No damage occurred.						

=== July 26 event ===
List of confirmed tornadoes – Thursday, July 26, 2018
EF#	Location	County / Parish	State	Start Coord.	Time (UTC)	Path length	Max width
EF1	Eastern Douglas to Southern Northbridge	Worcester	MA	42.0531°N 71.6983°W	06:32–06:40	4.4 mi (7.1 km)	200 yd (180 m)
EF1	Numerous large trees were snapped or uprooted, some of which landed on homes.						
EF1	Western Upton	Worcester	MA	42.167°N 71.627°W	06:41–06:43	1.04 mi (1.67 km)	100 yd (91 m)
EF1	Large trees were snapped or uprooted, some of which fell on homes and caused roof damage. One house home had part of its roof torn off and flipped over.						
EF0	N of Casper	Natrona	WY	42.9°N 106.32°W	21:32–21:33	0.23 mi (0.37 km)	20 yd (18 m)
EF0	Two trained storm spotters photographed a weak tornado over open country. No damage occurred.						

=== July 27 event ===
List of confirmed tornadoes – Friday, July 27, 2018
EF#	Location	County / Parish	State	Start Coord.	Time (UTC)	Path length	Max width
EF1	Oatland Island to Whitemarsh Island	Chatham	GA	32.0644°N 81.0287°W	19:49–19:57	2.35 mi (3.78 km)	100 yd (91 m)
EF1	Hundreds of trees were snapped or uprooted by this large cone tornado, dozens of which landed on homes and caused significant roof damage. The roof was ripped from a log cabin and another structure sustained partial roof removal. Marsh Point Elementary School suffered moderate damage to its roof, while metal bleachers were flipped and fencing was damaged at Islands High School.						
EF0	E of Raymondville	Willacy	TX	26.4842°N 97.722°W	21:03–21:05	1.88 mi (3.03 km)	25 yd (23 m)
EF0	Patches of sugar cane were blown down.						
EF1	S of Byers	Arapahoe	CO	39.608°N 104.215°W	21:49–21:52	1.33 mi (2.14 km)	50 yd (46 m)
EF1	A house sustained partial roof removal and a UPS truck was flipped, injuring the driver.						
EF1	NE of Ponderosa Park	Elbert	CO	39.407°N 104.58°W	21:51–21:53	1.17 mi (1.88 km)	50 yd (46 m)
EF1	A brief tornado uprooted trees.						
EF1	E of Deer Trail	Adams	CO	39.595°N 103.968°W	21:55–21:58	1.97 mi (3.17 km)	50 yd (46 m)
EF1	A house had its windows blown out and a metal cattle feeder was tossed 0.25 mi (0.40 km).						
EF0	SW of Shamrock	Adams	CO	39.762°N 103.94°W	22:06–22:12	3.1 mi (5.0 km)	50 yd (46 m)
EF0	A storm chaser observed a tornado that caused no damage.						
EF0	NE of Deer Trail	Arapahoe	CO	39.7°N 103.849°W	22:18–22:33	4.51 mi (7.26 km)	50 yd (46 m)
EF0	Minor fence damage was observed.						

=== July 28 event ===
List of confirmed tornadoes – Saturday, July 28, 2018
EF#	Location	County / Parish	State	Start Coord.	Time (UTC)	Path length	Max width
EF3	SW of Douglas	Converse	WY	42.6452°N 105.5134°W	21:50–22:15	4.44 mi (7.15 km)	350 yd (320 m)
EF3	A strong cone tornado snapped trees and power poles along its path. Several large bales of hay were tossed nearly 300 yd (270 m) from where they originated. The most intense damage occurred at a ranch, where a large, well-built metal quonset hut tractor storage building was obliterated, with two nearby large utility trailers weighing several thousand pounds being blown away and never found with the exception of one axle set. Large trees in this area were denuded, completely stripped of vegetation, and sustained debarking. A nearby home also lost most of its roof.						
EF1	SSW of Douglas	Converse	WY	42.5681°N 105.4325°W	22:20–22:28	1.78 mi (2.86 km)	150 yd (140 m)
EF1	Numerous trees were snapped along the path.						
EFU	WSW of Glendo	Platte	WY	42.4329°N 105.2829°W	22:27–22:45	3.36 mi (5.41 km)	50 yd (46 m)
EFU	Law enforcement reported a tornado over open fields.						
EF0	S of Kimball	Kimball	NE	41.1965°N 103.65°W	23:40–23:42	1.01 mi (1.63 km)	75 yd (69 m)
EF0	A weak tornado spun a driver's truck.						
EF0	W of Sterling	Logan	CO	40.63°N 103.35°W	01:01–01:02	0.01 mi (0.016 km)	50 yd (46 m)
EF0	A trained storm spotter reported a brief tornado in an open field.						

=== July 29 event ===
List of confirmed tornadoes – Sunday, July 29, 2018
EF#	Location	County / Parish	State	Start Coord.	Time (UTC)	Path length	Max width
EF0	W of Albin	Laramie	WY	41.44°N 104.35°W	19:55–19:58	1.04 mi (1.67 km)	75 yd (69 m)
EF0	An emergency manager reported a tornado over open country.						
EF0	S of Kyle	Oglala Lakota	SD	43.3237°N 102.1858°W	20:20	0.04 mi (0.064 km)	10 yd (9.1 m)
EF0	The tops of trees were twisted or broken.						
EF0	N of Cheyenne	Laramie	WY	41.2073°N 104.8065°W	20:45–20:47	0.17 mi (0.27 km)	50 yd (46 m)
EF0	A trained storm spotter reported a tornado.						
EF0	E of Pawnee Buttes	Weld	CO	40.83°N 103.77°W	21:28–21:29	0.01 mi (0.016 km)	50 yd (46 m)
EF0	This tornado remained over open country, causing no damage.						
EF2	NW of Hillrose	Morgan	CO	40.25°N 103.6°W	22:48	0.1 mi (0.16 km)	75 yd (69 m)
EF2	A strong tornado passed northwest of Hillrose, destroying a large metal structure. Many trees were uprooted, and vehicles sustained damage from flying debris.						
EF2	Eastern Brush	Morgan	CO	40.27°N 103.62°W	22:49	0.1 mi (0.16 km)	75 yd (69 m)
EF2	A rain-wrapped tornado caused severe damage at the Brush Municipal Airport, where hangars and small airplanes were destroyed. Outbuildings were destroyed as well, and major tree and roof damage occurred.						
EF1	N of Brush	Morgan	CO	40.28°N 103.61°W	22:53	0.1 mi (0.16 km)	50 yd (46 m)
EF1	Power poles were snapped and street signs were ripped from the ground.						

=== July 30 event ===
List of confirmed tornadoes – Monday, July 30, 2018
EF#	Location	County / Parish	State	Start Coord.	Time (UTC)	Path length	Max width
EF0	W of Arkansas City	Sumner, Cowley	KS	37.1074°N 97.199°W	18:41–18:47	3.73 mi (6.00 km)	100 yd (91 m)
EF0	Trained storm spotters reported a tornado that caused minimal damage.						
EF0	SW of Hartford	Minnehaha	SD	43.5812°N 97.047°W	22:16–22:17	0.11 mi (0.18 km)	25 yd (23 m)
EF0	A garage was destroyed.						
EF0	ESE of Wall Lake	Minnehaha	SD	43.51°N 96.9°W	22:26–22:27	0.1 mi (0.16 km)	10 yd (9.1 m)
EF0	Broadcast media relayed evidence of a brief tornado.						

=== July 31 event ===
List of confirmed tornadoes – Tuesday, July 31, 2018
EF#	Location	County / Parish	State	Start Coord.	Time (UTC)	Path length	Max width
EF0	Kentucky Lake	Lyon	KY	36.8742°N 88.1665°W	23:10–23:12	1.04 mi (1.67 km)	20 yd (18 m)
EF0	At least one boater captured a waterspout on video.						
EF0	E of Owens	Marion	OH	40.513°N 83.1153°W	02:36–02:38	1.04 mi (1.67 km)	20 yd (18 m)
EF0	A barn lost its roof, a tree was downed, and some crop damage occurred.						
EF1	Oregon	Lucas	OH	41.6219°N 83.4714°W	02:50–03:00	6.78 mi (10.91 km)	25 yd (23 m)
EF1	A tornado along an intermittent track damaged the shingles and roofs of homes, inflicted significant roof damage to a barn, moved some cars, and damaged trees.						

== See also ==
- Tornadoes of 2018
- List of United States tornadoes in May 2018
- List of United States tornadoes from August to October 2018
