= First Financial Center =

Event venue in Cincinnati, Ohio

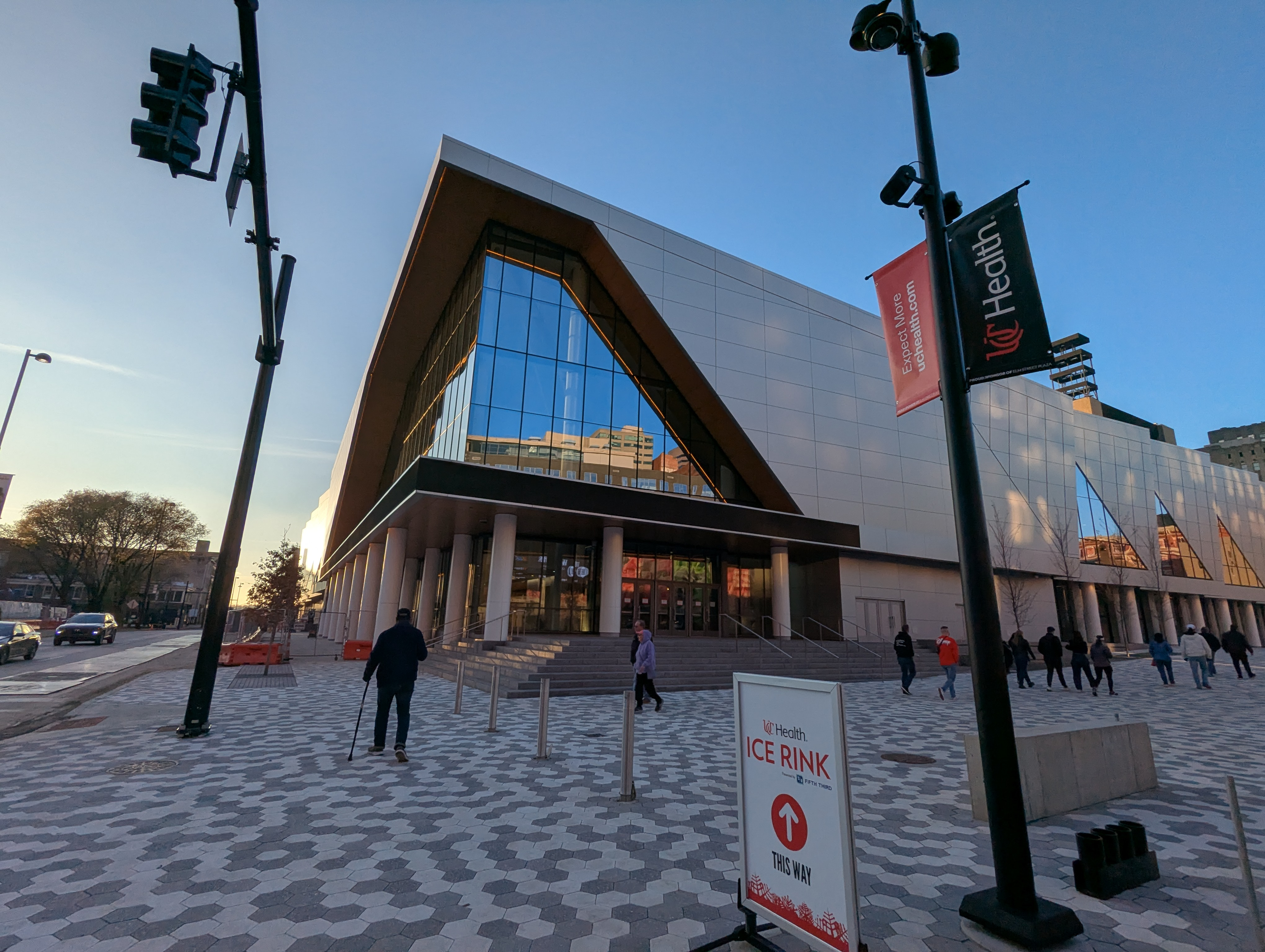
- The building entrance in 2025
- Interactive map of First Financial Center
- Address: 525 Elm Street; Cincinnati, Ohio 45202
- Coordinates: 39°06′05″N 84°31′03″W
- Owner: City of Cincinnati
- Operator: Legends Global
- Public transit: Connector at Fountain Square; Metro; Red Bike

Construction
- Opened: 1967
- Expanded: 1984, 2006
- Cost: $10.0 million ($96.6 million in 2025 dollars)

Website
- https://thefirstfinancialcenter.com/

First Financial Center is a convention center located in downtown Cincinnati, Ohio, covering two city blocks bounded by Elm Street, 5th Street, 6th Street, and Central Avenue.

== History ==
The convention center opened in 1967 as the Convention-Exposition Center.

It was renamed the Albert B. Sabin Convention and Exposition Center on November 14, 1985, amid national criticism that Second Street had been named after Pete Rose instead of the pioneering medical researcher.

The convention was renovated and expanded in 2006. Following this renovation, the venue's name was changed to Duke Energy Convention Center, as part of a naming rights sponsorship deal with Duke Energy.

In 2020, the center was designed for use as a field hospital along with other similar facilities nationwide to house patients during the COVID-19 pandemic in the event that area hospitals reach capacity.

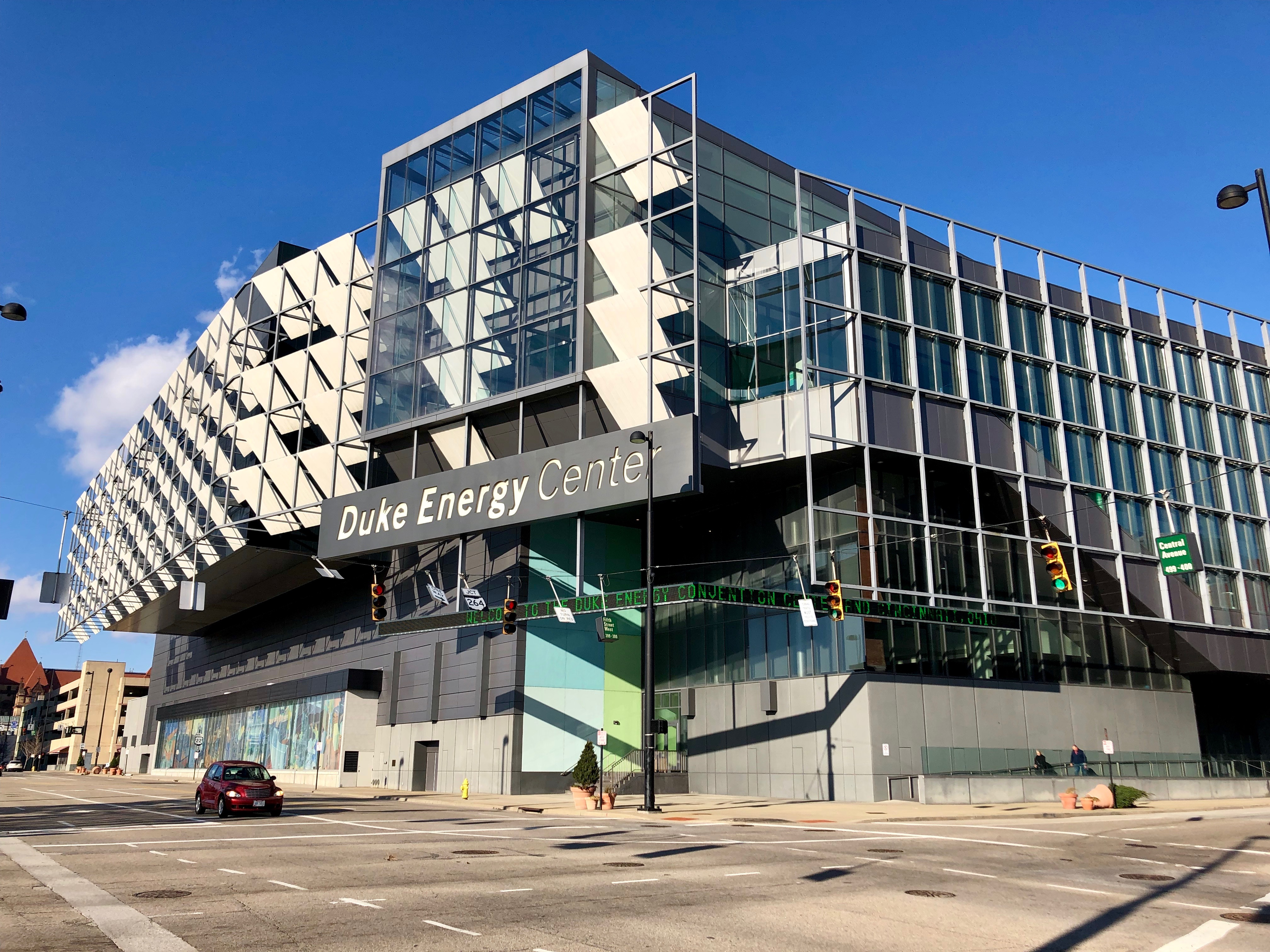
The building exterior in 2019

=== 2020s renovation ===
In 2022, planning began for a $200 million renovation to the convention center, which would include a new exterior facade, upgrades to exhibit spaces and technology, a new convention center hotel, and new green space. Funding for the project included $30 million from the city of Cincinnati, $15 million and a hotel tax increase from Hamilton County, and $46 million from the Ohio Department of Development. The plans were finalized in 2024, and the center closed to begin work on July 1.

The first segment of the project to be completed was Elm Street Plaza, which opened on November 21, 2025. Elm Street, which runs along the eastern edge of the convention center, was closed to cars between Fifth and Sixth Streets. A formerly-vacant lot across Elm Street from the convention center was converted into gardens and green space with a temporary ice rink during winter and a permanent bar.

Construction on the convention center was completed at a reported cost of $264 million, and a grand opening ceremony was held on January 7, 2026. The first event in the remodeled space was Redsfest, a Cincinnati Reds fan event held the following weekend.

During construction, it was announced that the city would buy out the remaining six years of Duke Energy's naming rights deal for $1.6 million. The center reopened temporarily under the name Cincinnati Convention Center. On February 9, 2026, the venue became known as First Financial Center, after the city signed a 15-year naming rights deal with First Financial Bank.

The new convention center hotel, to be located immediately south of the center and connected via a skyway, is under construction; as of June 2025, it is expected to be completed by 2028.

== Name history ==
- Convention-Exposition Center (1968–1985)
- Albert B. Sabin Convention and Exposition Center (1985–2006)
- Duke Energy Convention Center (2006–2025)
- Cincinnati Convention Center (2025–2026)
- First Financial Center (2026–present)

== Operations ==
Venue management company, Legends Global, oversees day-to-day operations of the 750,000-square-foot (70,000 m^{2}) facility.

== Notable events ==
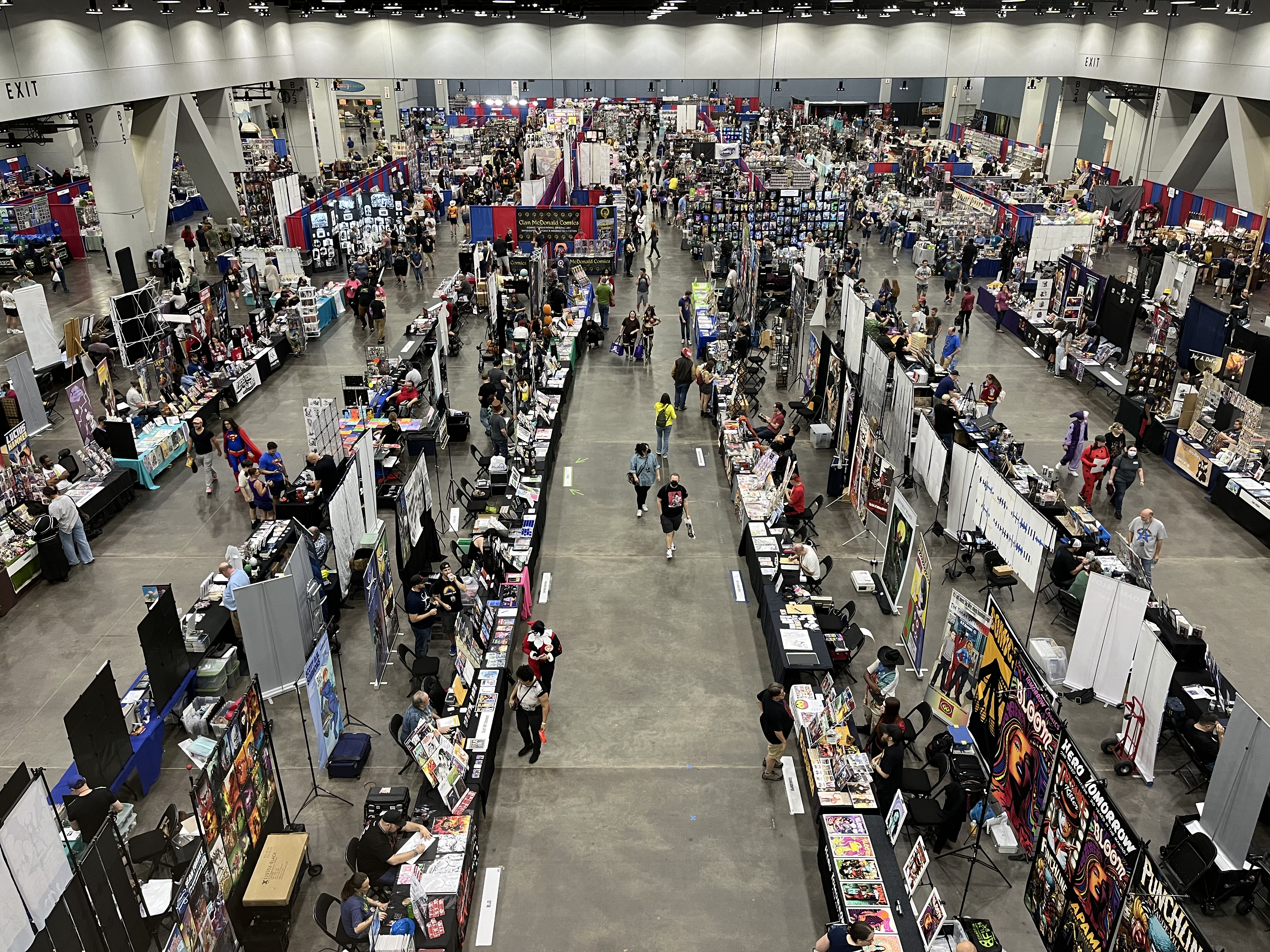
Exhibition hall during Cincinnati Comic Expo 2023

The convention center annually hosts RedsFest, a fan event for the Cincinnati Reds, as well as Cincinnati Winter Beer Fest, Cincinnati Auto Expo, and Cincinnati Home and Garden Show.

The Duke Energy Center played host to the 2012 World Choir Games when it hosted the opening and closing ceremonies, as well as the awards ceremonies of the games.

In July 2015, the convention center hosted the 2015 MLB All-Star Fan Fest.

The DECC was host to the 1977 National Rifle Association (NRA) annual convention, at which the Revolt at Cincinnati resulted in the election of Harlon Carter as the leader of the NRA, and a change in emphasis for the organization, away from hunting, conservation, and marksmanship and toward an uncompromising defense of the personal ownership of firearms for self-defense.

== See also ==
- List of convention centers in the United States
