= G. Ray Arnett =

American conservationist and lobbyist (1924–2019)

George Raymond Arnett (June 14, 1924 – June 20, 2019) was an American conservationist, government official, and lobbyist who was the California Fish and Game Commissioner, Assistant Secretary of the Interior for Fish and Wildlife and Parks, and executive vice president of the National Rifle Association of America.

== Early life and military service ==
Arnett was born on Marine Corps Base Quantico in Quantico, Virginia and moved to California when he was seven years old. He graduated from Point Loma High School in San Diego and briefly attended the University of California, Los Angeles before enlisting in the United States Marine Corps at the start of World War II. He was sworn into the Marines by his father, Roscoe Arnett, who was the officer in charge of Marine recruiting in Southern California. Arnett served with the Fleet Marine Force, Pacific and received a field commission in the South Pacific. After the war, he was sent to the University of Southern California to take part in the V-12 College Training Program. He received a second lieutenant commission and earned undergraduate and graduate degrees in petroleum engineering and geology. He was recalled to active duty in 1950 and served for eighteen months during the Korean War before receiving an honorable discharge.

== Career ==
Arnett graduated from the University of Southern California in 1947 spent twenty years as a geologist for the Richfield Oil Corporation. He led a team that drilled the first oil and gas well on the Kenai Peninsula. He later worked in the public relations department of ARCO.

In 1960, he was the Republican nominee for the United States House of Representatives seat in California's 14th congressional district. He lost to four-term incumbent Harlan Hagen 56% to 44%. He ran against Hagen again in 1962 (this time in the 18th district), and lost 59% to 41%.

From 1969 to 1975, Arnett was Fish and Game Commissioner of California. From 1976 to 1978, he was president of the National Wildlife Federation. From 1981 to 1984, he was Assistant Secretary of the Interior for Fish and Wildlife and Parks.

On January 26, 1985, Arnett was appointed interim executive vice president of the National Rifle Association by the group's board of directors. On April 20, 1985, he defeated Neal Knox 2,014 votes to 887 to win a five-year term. On May 17, 1986, the NRA board of directors fired Arnett, alleging that he had used organization funds to pay for personal hunting trips, fired the entire public education staff without consulting the board, and promoted a female employee with whom he had a personal relationship.

After leaving the NRA, Arnett founded Arnett Associates, a consulting firm that assisted businesses with the state and federal permitting processes. He died on June 20, 2019, at a nursing home in Stockton, California.

Non-profit organization positions
Preceded by Harlon Carter	Executive Vice President and Chief Executive Officer of the National Rifle Association of America; 1985–1986	Succeeded by J. Warren Cassidy
Political offices
Preceded by Robert Herbst	Assistant Secretary of the Interior for Fish and Wildlife and Parks; 1981–1984	Succeeded by William P. Horn
Preceded by Walt Shannon	California Fish and Game Commissioner; 1969–1975	Succeeded by E. Charles Fullerton
