= Camp Crook =

Camp Crook may refer to:

- Camp Crook, South Dakota
- Camp Crook (Montana), a former military installation in Montana
