= Maxwell Rich =

United States Army general

Maxwell Evans Rich (August 13, 1913 – July 29, 1979) was a major general in the United States Army. He also served as an Adjutant General of the Utah National Guard. He was an Executive Vice President of the National Rifle Association of America (NRA).

== Background ==
As Executive Vice President of the NRA from 1970 to 1977, succeeding General Franklin Orth and followed by Harlon Carter, he was part of the "Old Guard". He planned to sell the NRA HQ in Washington, DC, and move it to Colorado Springs, Colorado, and to reduce the organization's political involvement. He sought to return the NRA to what he saw as its heritage of shooting sports and marksmanship. However members of his own staff disagreed. A grassroots movement led by Neal Knox and Harlon Carter ousted Rich and the "old guard" as a result of the so-called "Cincinnati Revolt" or "Cincinnati Coup", which occurred at the 1977 annual meeting.
