= General Rich =

General Rich may refer to:

- Maxwell Rich (1913–1979), U.S. Army major general
- Sir Robert Rich, 4th Baronet (1685–1768), British Army general
- Sir Robert Rich, 5th Baronet (1717–1785), British Army lieutenant general
