= Thomas H. Werdel =

American politician

Thomas Werdel
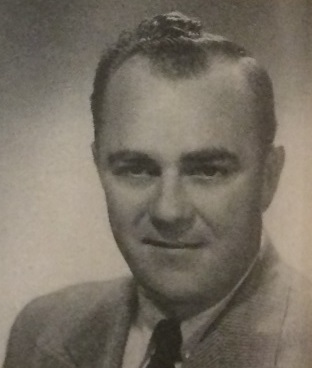

Member of the U.S. House of Representatives from California's 10th district
- In office January 3, 1949 – January 3, 1953
- Preceded by: Alfred J. Elliott
- Succeeded by: Charles Gubser

Member of the California State Assembly from the 39th district
- In office January 3, 1943 – January 6, 1947
- Preceded by: Alfred W. Robertson
- Succeeded by: Wright Elwood James

Personal details
- Born: Thomas Harold Werdel; September 13, 1905 Emery, South Dakota, U.S.
- Died: September 30, 1966 (aged 61) Bakersfield, California, U.S.
- Party: Republican
- Other political affiliations: State's Rights Party (1956)
- Spouse: Rosemary Cutter (m. 1934)
- Children: 3
- Education: University of California at Berkeley; UC Berkeley School of Law

Thomas Harold Werdel (September 13, 1905 – September 30, 1966) was an American politician and lawyer who served as an assembly member (1943–47) and Representative (1949-53) from California as a member of the Republican Party.

Werdel was staunchly conservative and supported Senator Robert Taft's 1952 presidential bid and later served as T. Coleman Andrews's vice presidential running mate on the State's Rights Party ticket.

== Early life ==
Thomas Harold Werdel was born to Mary Laura Burke and Bernard Werdel in Emery, South Dakota on September 13, 1905. In 1912, Werdel moved with his parents to California and three years later in 1915, they settled in Kern County, California. He attended the public schools and Kern County Union High School. He graduated from the University of California at Berkeley in 1930, and from the UC Berkeley School of Law in 1936. He was admitted to the bar in 1936, and started to practice law in Bakersfield, California.

== Career ==
=== State Assembly ===
On June 24, 1942, he announced his candidacy for the 39th Assembly District and won both the Democratic and Republican nominations leading him to run unopposed in the general election. Shortly before the election he was selected as Kern County's delegate to the California Republican state convention.

After taking office Werdel was appointed as chairman of the Judiciary Committee and also appointed as a member of the Conservation, Natural Resources and Planning, Roads and Highways, Government Efficiency and Economy, and Elections and Reapportionment committees. The first legislation he proposed in the state Assembly was a resolution requesting the federal government to grant funds to help in the construction of the Madera and Friant-Kern canals. Following the riot on Hollywood Black Friday in 1945, he served on a committee investigation into the Conference of Studio Unions and accused them of being guilty of conspiracy. Werdel submitted a resolution to condemn Attorney General Robert W. Kenny that accused him of being an associate of subversive communist groups, but was overwhelmingly rejected by a vote of 57 to 19 in the Assembly.

In 1946, he announced that he would not seek reelection and that he would not run for the state Senate as he was quitting state politics. In 1947, after leaving office, he was appointed to the Citizens Advisory Committee on Legislative Constitutional Revision.

=== House of Representatives ===
In March 1948, he announced his intention to run for California's 10th Congressional District seat and filed to run in both the Democratic and Republican primaries where he easily won the Republican primary and narrowly won the Democratic primary. During the campaign Governor and Republican vice presidential nominee Earl Warren showed support for Werdel. In the general election he easily defeated the Progressive nominee; he was one of the four Republican gains that year, and would serve in the Eighty-first and Eighty-second Congresses from 1949 to 1953.

In 1949, he accused union leaders, specifically from the National Education Association, AFL and CIO, of plotting to use an education aid bill created by Democrats to defeat Senator Robert A. Taft in Ohio's 1950 Senate election. During the 1952 Republican primaries Werdel announced that he would run a slate of seventy delegates in the California primary to lead a pro-Taft delegation to the Republican National Convention rather than a pro-Warren one and he attacked Warren for supporting socialized medicine. However, Governor Earl Warren, a favorite son candidate, once again controlled California's votes.

He was an unsuccessful candidate for reelection in 1952 to the Eighty-third Congress after he was redistricted into the 14th Congressional District and was defeated by Harlan Hagen.

== Later life ==
He resumed the practice of law. In 1956, he was the running mate of T. Coleman Andrews as the State's Rights Party candidates; they won 107,929 votes (0.17%), doing best in Virginia, where they received 6.16% of the vote. During the 1960 and 1964 presidential elections he served as a campaign adviser to Richard Nixon and Barry Goldwater.

=== Death ===
On September 30, 1966, he died in Bakersfield, California, and was survived by his wife and three sons. He was interred in Greenlawn Memorial Park.

== Electoral history ==
Thomas H. Werdel electoral history

1948 California Tenth Congressional District election
| Party | Candidate | Votes | % | ±% |
|---|---|---|---|---|
| Republican | Thomas H. Werdel | 67,448 | 71.28% | +71.28% |
| California Progressive Party | Sam J. Miller | 27,168 | 28.71% | +28.71% |
| Write-in | | 15 | 0.02% | –0.19% |
| Total votes | | 94,631 | 100.00% | |

1950 California Tenth Congressional District election
| Party | Candidate | Votes | % | ±% |
|---|---|---|---|---|
| Republican | Thomas H. Werdel (incumbent) | 59,313 | 53.57% | −17.71% |
| Democratic | Ardis M. Walker | 51,409 | 46.43% | +46.43% |
| Write-in | | 2 | 0.00% | –0.02% |
| Total votes | | 110,724 | 100.00% | |

1952 California Fourteenth Congressional District election
| Party | Candidate | Votes | % | ±% |
|---|---|---|---|---|
| Democratic | Harlan Hagen | 70,809 | 51.01% | +1.66% |
| Republican | Thomas H. Werdel (incumbent) | 68,011 | 48.99% | +12.18% |
| Write-in | | 3 | 0.00% | ±0.00% |
| Total votes | | 138,820 | 100.00% | |

== See also ==
- T. Coleman Andrews

U.S. House of Representatives
| Preceded by Alfred J. Elliott | Member of the U.S. House of Representatives from California's 10th congressional district 1949–1953 | Succeeded by Charles Gubser |
