= Assistant Secretary of the Interior for Fish and Wildlife and Parks =

The assistant secretary for fish and wildlife and parks is appointed by the president of the United States and confirmed by the United States Senate. The assistant secretary for fish and wildlife and parks reports to the United States Secretary of the Interior, who is the head of the U.S. Department of the Interior. The assistant secretary for fish and wildlife and parks has the direct responsibility for programs associated with the management and conservation of natural resources, including the National Park Service, Fish and Wildlife Service, Air Resources Division, American Indian Liaison Office, Geological Resources Division, and the Water Resources Division.

The current assistant secretary is Kevin J. Lilly since July 31, 2025.

== List of assistant secretaries for fish and wildlife and parks ==
- G. Ray Arnett 1981–1984
- Harold Craig Manson 2002 to 2005
- Matt Hogan (Acting) July 7, 2006
- David M. Verhey (Acting) July 28, 2006 to 2007
- R. Lyle Laverty 2007 to 2009
- Tom Strickland 2009 to 2011
- Rob Wallace 2019 to 2021
- Shannon Estenoz 2021 to January 2025
- Kevin J. Lilly July 2025 to present
