= Revolt at Cincinnati =

1977 change in leadership of the National Rifle Association of America

The Revolt at Cincinnati (also known as the Cincinnati Coup or the Cincinnati Revolution) was a change in the National Rifle Association of America's (NRA) leadership and organizational policy which took place at the group's 1977 annual convention in Cincinnati, Ohio. Led by former NRA president Harlon Carter and gun rights activist Neal Knox, the movement ended the tenure of Maxwell Rich as executive vice-president of the NRA and introduced new organizational bylaws. The Revolt at Cincinnati has been cited as a turning point in the NRA's history, marking a move away from the group's focus on "hunting, conservation, and marksmanship" and towards defending the right to keep and bear arms.

== Background ==
The NRA was a dynamic political presence by the 1920s and campaigned furiously against early versions of the National Firearms Act which would have required a permit to purchase a pistol. Following the passage of the 1968 Gun Control Act and the NRA's abstention from the "Citizens Against Tydings" campaign to unseat Joseph Tydings, a group led by Harlon Carter began advocating for a renewed focus on the defense of gun ownership.

In 1975, NRA management allowed Carter to form the NRA's registered lobbying arm - the Institute for Legislative Action (NRA-ILA). With only a small amount of funding from the NRA this was expected to quietly limit Carter's activism. However, he adopted modern and cost-effective direct-mail marketing techniques and quickly started to build political power. The NRA's Political Action Committee - the NRA Political Victory Fund - was formed in time for the 1976 elections. Carter found an ally in Neal Knox, editor of Rifle magazine, who increasingly called readers to political action.

In November 1976, Maxwell Rich fired most of Carter's staff, disturbed by his growing influence and no-compromise attitude to legislation. Carter resigned in protest and concentrated on winning the support of the NRA's Life Members ahead of the 1977 annual meeting, assisted by Neal Knox's editorial reach. This membership class, consisting of over 2 million individuals, had voted along with existing leaders in the preceding annual conventions.

== The revolt ==
At the Cincinnati convention, Carter and Knox led a grassroots movement with a focus on preventing the construction of an Outdoor Center in Colorado Springs and unseating the "Old Guard" leadership. The Outdoor Center would have served as new headquarters for the organization away from Washington DC and politics, while the Old Guard referred to the many leaders who had spent multiple decades in their positions. Members of the group wore orange hats and carried walkie-talkies on the floor of the convention. Carter's group succeeded in unseating members of the incumbent leadership, producing a subsequent removal of leadership members and a change in organizational focus.

== Resulting leadership changes ==
Carter replaced Rich as executive vice president. The executive vice president position was changed to become a member-elected office. Knox was elected as head of the NRA-ILA, with the position of vice president for finance, held by Thomas Billings, eliminated; the management committee of the organization, consisting of Merrill Right, Irvine Reynolds, and Alonzo H. Garcelon, was also eliminated.

== Resulting organizational changes ==
Preceding the 1977 convention, the NRA's leadership had made plans to move the group's headquarters from Washington, D.C., to an Outdoor Center in Colorado Springs focused on conservation and recreational shooting. The new facility had an estimated cost of $30 million. The proposal for this Center was included as an item for discussion in the 1977 meeting, and was rejected following the change in leadership.

The new leadership increased funding for its lobbying arm, the NRA-ILA, by an undisclosed amount. The NRA-ILA was given freedom to support the rights to "keep and bear arms". The NRA redefined its stance on gun control, defending protections provided by the Second Amendment. Moving away from prior support for "incremental forms of gun control regulation," new leadership made the "protection of gun rights the NRA's primary cause."
