= Harlan Hagen =

American politician

Harlan Francis Hagen
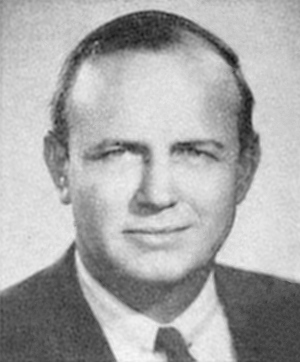

Member of the U.S. House of Representatives from California's 14th district
- In office January 3, 1953 – January 3, 1967
- Preceded by: Thomas H. Werdel (Redistricting)
- Succeeded by: Robert B. Mathias
- Constituency: 14th district (1953–1963); 18th district (1963–1967)

Member of the California State Assembly from the 36th district
- In office January 3, 1949 - January 3, 1953
- Preceded by: Harry J. Johnson
- Succeeded by: Stanley T. Tomlinson

Personal details
- Born: October 8, 1914 Lawton, North Dakota
- Died: November 25, 1990 (aged 76) Hanford, California
- Party: Democratic Party
- Spouse: Martha Ritz
- Education: University of California at Berkeley

Military service
- Allegiance: United States of America
- Branch/service: United States Army
- Years of service: 1943-1946
- Battles/wars: World War II

Harlan Francis Hagen (October 8, 1914 – November 25, 1990) was an American lawyer and World War II veteran who served as a United States representative from California. A member of the Democratic Party, he served in the U.S. House of Representatives from 1953 to 1967, representing the 14th and 18th districts of California.

== Early life and education ==
Born in Lawton, North Dakota, Hagen graduated from Long Beach Polytechnic High School in Long Beach, California. He went on to graduate from Long Beach City College in 1933 and from the University of California, Berkeley with an A.B. degree in 1936. In 1940, he received an L.L.B. from Berkeley.

After receiving his law degree, Hagen entered the private practice of law.

=== World War II ===
During World War II, he served in the U.S. Army from 1943 to 1946.

== Political career ==
Hagen was elected to the city council of Hanford, California, in 1948. Later that year, he was elected to the California State Assembly where he served from 1949 to 1952.

=== Congress ===
In 1952, Hagen was elected to the 83rd Congress as a Democrat, defeating Republican Congressman Thomas Werdel with 51% of the vote. He went on to serve seven terms in the House of Representatives, from January 3, 1953, to January 3, 1967. During his tenure in Congress, he voted in favor of the 1957 Civil Rights Act, the Civil Rights Act of 1960, and the Civil Rights Act of 1964. He voted as well for the 24th Amendment to the U.S. Constitution and the Voting Rights Act of 1965.

Hagen was defeated for reelection in 1966 by the Republican candidate, Bob Mathias, by a margin of 55.9% to 44.1% in what was by then designated as the 18th District. He tried to win the seat back from Mathias in 1968 but was again defeated, receiving only 33.4% of the vote.

== Death ==
Hagen died on November 25, 1990, in Hanford, California.

== Electoral history ==
1952 United States House of Representatives elections
Party	Candidate	Votes	%
Democratic	Harlan Hagen	70,809	51
Republican	Thomas H. Werdel (Incumbent)	68,011	49
Total votes		138,820	100
Turnout			
Democratic gain from Republican			

1954 United States House of Representatives elections
Party	Candidate	Votes	%
Democratic	Harlan Hagen	75,194	65
Republican	Al Blain	40,270	35
Total votes		115,464	100
Turnout			
Democratic hold			

1956 United States House of Representatives elections
Party	Candidate	Votes	%
Democratic	Harlan Hagen (Incumbent)	94,461	63
Republican	Myron F. Tisdel	55,509	37
Total votes		149,970	100
Turnout			
Democratic hold			

1958 United States House of Representatives elections
Party	Candidate	Votes	%
Democratic	Harlan Hagen (Incumbent)	120,347	100.0
Turnout			
Democratic hold			

1960 United States House of Representatives elections
Party	Candidate	Votes	%
Democratic	Harlan Hagen (Incumbent)	97,026	56.5
Republican	G. Ray Arnett	74,800	43.5
Total votes		171,826	100.0
Turnout			
Democratic hold			

United States House of Representatives elections, 1962
Party	Candidate	Votes	%
Democratic	Harlan Hagen (incumbent)	91,684	58.9
Republican	G. Ray Arnett	64,037	41.1
Total votes		155,721	100.0
Turnout			
Democratic hold			

United States House of Representatives elections, 1964
Party	Candidate	Votes	%
Democratic	Harlan Hagen (incumbent)	121,304	66.7
Republican	James E. Williams Jr.	60,523	33.3
Total votes		181,827	100.0
Turnout			
Democratic hold			

United States House of Representatives elections, 1966
Party	Candidate	Votes	%
Republican	Bob Mathias	96,699	55.9
Democratic	Harlan Hagen (incumbent)	76,346	44.1
Total votes		173,045	100.0
Turnout			
Republican gain from Democratic			

United States House of Representatives elections, 1968
Party	Candidate	Votes	%
Republican	Bob Mathias (incumbent)	100,008	65.2
Democratic	Harlan Hagen	51,274	33.4
American Independent	Edward Calvin Williams	2,186	1.4
Total votes		153,468	100.0
Turnout			
Republican hold			

U.S. House of Representatives
Preceded by Samuel W. Yorty	Member of the U.S. House of Representatives from California's 14th congressional district 1953–1963	Succeeded by John F. Baldwin, Jr.
Preceded by Craig Hosmer	Member of the U.S. House of Representatives from California's 18th congressional district 1963–1967	Succeeded by Robert B. Mathias
