= Capitol, Montana =

Populated place in Montana, United States

Capitol is an unincorporated community in Carter County, Montana, United States. It is located adjacent to the South Dakota state line.

== Geography ==
Capitol is located at 45°26′10″N 104°03′54″W. Its elevation is 3,183 ft (970 m).

Capitol was named after Capitol Rock, a prominent landmark in the nearby Long Pine Hills. Capitol is located on the Little Missouri River.

== Post Office ==
Capitol had a post office from 1891 to 1982. Residents who have a Capitol address receive their mail from the neighboring post office of Camp Crook, South Dakota.

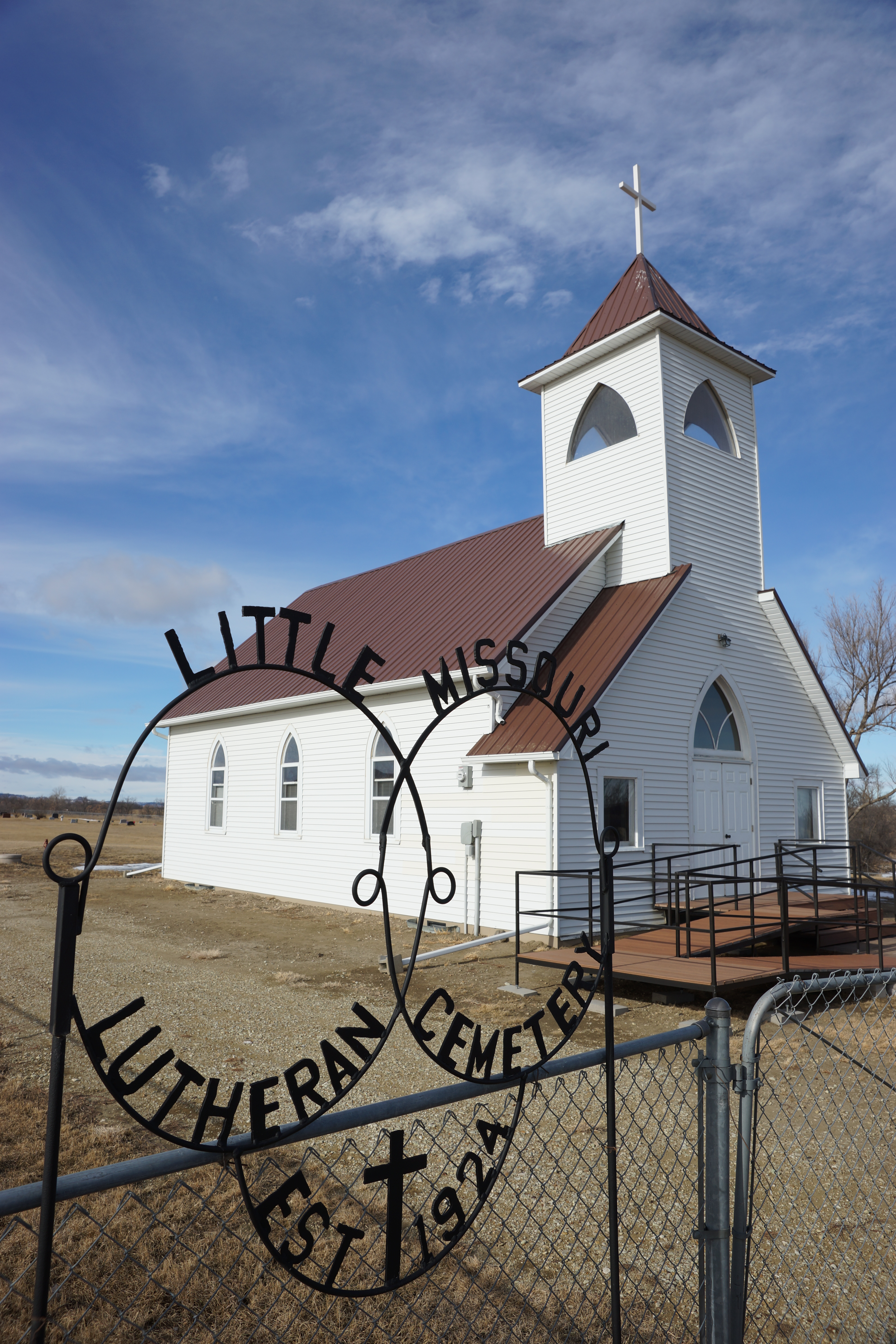
Little Missouri Lutheran Church in Montana

== Church ==
A church named 'Little Missouri Lutheran Church' is located near Capitol. The congregation celebrated its 125th anniversary in 2014. The church was established 5 months before Montana became a state.

== Cemeteries ==
Capitol Cemetery is located northeast of town on Little Missouri Road. The Little Missouri Lutheran Church Cemetery is located behind the current church location.
