= Shannon Estenoz =

American government official

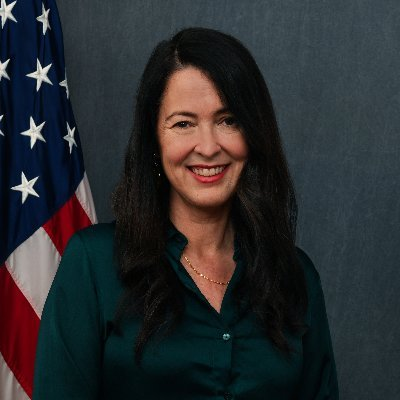

Assistant Secretary of the Interior for Fish and Wildlife and Parks
- In office July 12, 2021 – January 20, 2025
- President: Joe Biden
- Preceded by: Robert Wallace
- Succeeded by: Kevin J. Lilly

Personal details
- Born: Key West, Florida, U.S.
- Spouse: Richard Grosso
- Children: 2
- Education: Florida State University (BA, BS)

Shannon Aneal Estenoz is an American environmental activist and government official who served as Assistant Secretary of the Interior for Fish and Wildlife and Parks from 2021 to 2025. She currently serves as Chief Policy Officer at The Everglades Foundation.

== Early life and education ==
Estenoz is a native of Key West. She earned a Bachelor of Arts degree in international affairs and Bachelor of Science in civil engineering from Florida State University.

== Career ==
Estenoz previously served as Vice Chair of the South Florida Water Management District Governing Board. She also held leadership positions at the World Wildlife Fund and National Parks Conservation Association. She most recently worked as the COO and VP of Policy & Programs at the Everglades Foundation and served as director of the United States Department of the Interior's Office of Everglades Restoration Initiatives. She currently serves as Chief Policy Officer at The Everglades Foundation.

=== Interior Department Nomination ===
Estenoz was nominated by President Biden to serve as Assistant Secretary of the Interior for Fish and Wildlife and Parks on April 27, 2021. Hearings on her nomination were held before the Senate's Environment Committee on May 12, 2021. Another hearing was held before the Senate's Energy Committee on May 18, 2021. Both the Environment Committee and Energy Committee favorably reported the nominations on May 26, 2021, and May 27, 2021, respectively. On June 24, 2021, she was confirmed in the United States Senate by voice vote. Estenoz was also nominated by President Biden as Deputy Secretary of the Interior, with her nomination favorably reported by the Senate Committee on Energy and Natural Resources. She was sworn in on July 12, 2021.

== Personal life ==
Estenoz and her husband, Richard Grosso, have two children. Grosso is a public interest environmental attorney.
