= Harlon Carter =

American activist (1913–1991)

- Carter in 1977
- Born: August 10, 1913; Granbury, Texas, U.S.
- Died: November 19, 1991 (aged 78); Green Valley, Arizona, U.S.
- Education: University of Texas; Emory University School of Law

Harlon Bronson Carter (August 10, 1913 – November 19, 1991) was an American advocate for gun rights and a leader of the National Rifle Association of America. Carter's 1977 election as NRA Executive Vice President marked a turning point for the organization. During his tenure, from 1977 to 1985, he shifted the organization's focus from promoting marksmanship and sports shooting towards strident advocacy for less restrictive gun laws. Under Carter's leadership, the NRA became less compromising on gun rights issues. It also tripled its membership and gained considerable political influence.

When Carter was 17 years old, he shot and killed 15-year-old Ramón Casiano. Though Carter was convicted of Casiano's murder, this conviction was later overturned on a technicality, and the incident was not generally known during most of Carter's leadership of the NRA, but rose to greater prominence and infamy later.

== Biography ==
Carter was born in Granbury, Texas, and his family subsequently lived in Laredo, Texas. On March 3, 1931, 17-year-old Carter shot and killed 15-year-old Ramón Casiano. Carter believed that Casiano had information about the theft of his family's car, and, carrying a shotgun, he pointed it at Casiano and demanded that he return to the Carter home to submit to questioning. When Casiano refused Carter fatally shot him. No evidence tying Casiano with the car incident was ever found. Carter was convicted of murder, but the conviction was overturned by the Texas Court of Appeals, which found that the judge in the case had issued incorrect jury instructions regarding laws related to self-defense.

Carter graduated from the University of Texas and from Emory University School of Law. In 1936, Carter began a career with the United States Border Patrol, where his father had also worked. Carter also holds the distinction of being the first Chief to have attended the Border Patrol Academy. Carter rose through the ranks and in 1950 was appointed chief of the Border Patrol until 1957 where he led Operation Wetback. From 1961 to 1970, Carter directed the Southwestern region of the Immigration and Naturalization Service. He retired from government service in 1970.

Carter first joined the National Board of the NRA in 1951, and served as the organization's president from 1965-1967. In 1975, Carter became director of the NRA's lobbying arm, the Institute for Legislative Action. During the 1960s and 1970s, NRA leaders debated the organization's mission. Many of the organization's leaders believed that the NRA should focus on its traditional mission of promoting marksmanship and shooting sports. Carter, on the other hand, led a faction that wanted to see the NRA focus on advocating against gun control legislation.

The NRA leadership was ambivalent about the Gun Control Act of 1968, the first gun control legislation since the 1930s. Franklin Orth, the group's Executive Vice President at the time of the act's passage, supported some parts of law, including limits on mail-order gun purchases and bans of Saturday night specials, inexpensive, often low-quality handguns, while opposing other provisions as "unduly restrictive and unjustified in their application to law-abiding citizens". In contrast, Carter believed that no gun control legislation could be acceptable. He wrote to the NRA membership: "We can win it on a simple concept – No compromise. No gun legislation." Carter opposed background checks for gun purchasers, saying that the acquisition of guns by violent criminals and the mentally ill is the "price we pay for freedom".

In 1976, the NRA leadership fired seventy-four employees, most of them supporters of Carter. Carter resigned in protest. However, in 1977, at the NRA's annual meeting in Cincinnati, Ohio, Carter and other activists succeeded in changing the organization's bylaws and voting out much of the leadership. Carter replaced Maxwell Rich as Executive Vice President, responsible for the NRA's operations. In July of that year, he was featured prominently on the cover of The American Rifleman, the official magazine of the NRA. Carter remained in this position until 1985. Under Carter's leadership, the NRA's membership tripled to over three million. The organization's budget and political influence also increased.

In 1981, newspaper reporters learned that Carter had been convicted of murder related to the 1931 death of 15-year-old Ramón Casiano. Carter initially denied any knowledge of the incident but later acknowledged that he had been responsible for the shooting.

Carter died of lung cancer in 1991 at his home in Green Valley, Arizona. He was buried at Evergreen Memorial Park in Tucson, Arizona. He is survived by his wife, Maryann; a daughter, Joy Johnstone and two sons, J. William Carter and John Carter.

=== In popular culture ===
The album American Band by the Drive-By Truckers features a song, "Ramon Casiano", about the shooting of Casiano, and Carter's subsequent career.

== Notes ==
National Rifle Association of America
Preceded by Bartlett Rummel	President of the NRA; 1965–1967	Succeeded by Harold W. Glassen
Preceded by Maxwell Rich	Executive Vice President of the NRA; 1977–1985	Succeeded by G. Ray Arnett
Political offices
Preceded by Donald Tollaer	Chief of the Border Patrol; 1950–1957	Succeeded by James F. Greene
