= Lawton, North Dakota =

- City
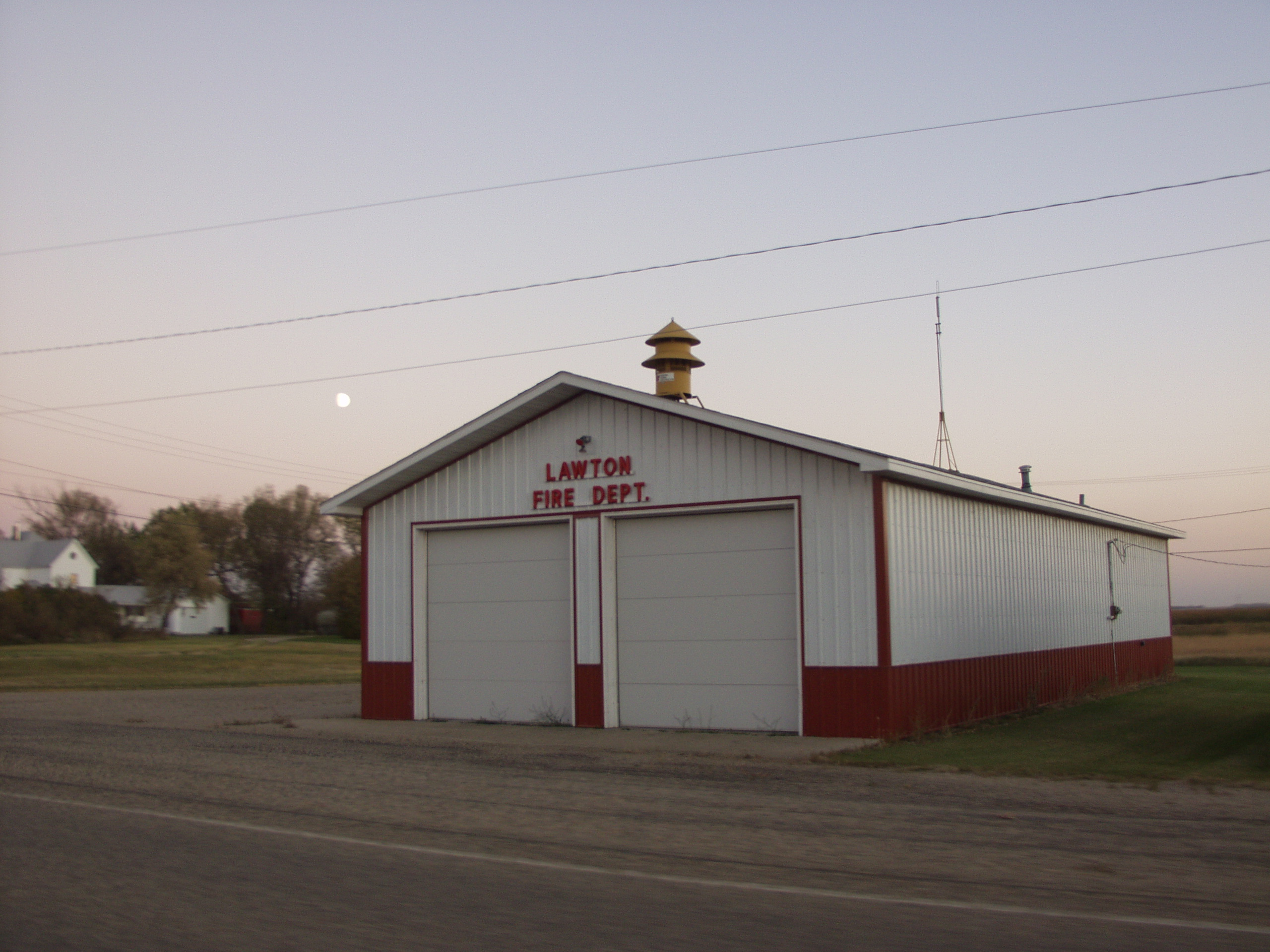
- The Lawton Fire Department
- Interactive map of Lawton, North Dakota
- Location within North Dakota Location within the United States
- Coordinates: 48.3033°N 98.3679°W
- Country: United States
- State: North Dakota
- County: Ramsey
- Founded: 1902

Area
  - Total: 0.989 sq mi (2.561 km^{2})
  - Land: 0.912 sq mi (2.363 km^{2})
  - Water: 0.077 sq mi (0.200 km^{2}) 7.79%
- Elevation: 1,522 ft (464 m)

Population (2020)
  - Total: 15
  - Estimate (2025): 18
  - Density: 16/sq mi (6.3/km^{2})
- Time zone: UTC–6 (Central (CST))
  - Summer (DST): UTC–5 (CDT)
- ZIP Code: 58345
- Area code: 701
- FIPS code: 38-45300
- GNIS feature ID: 1036122

Lawton is a city in Ramsey County, North Dakota, United States. The population was 15 as of the 2020 census, and was estimated at 18 in 2025.

== History ==
Lawton was founded in 1902.

== Geography ==
According to the United States Census Bureau, the city has a total area of 0.989 square miles (2.56 km^{2}), of which 0.912 square miles (2.36 km^{2}) is land and 0.077 square miles (0.20 km^{2}) (7.79%) is water.

== Demographics ==
Historical population
Census	Pop.	Note	%±
1920	227		—
1930	233		2.6%
1940	210		−9.9%
1950	211		0.5%
1960	159		−24.6%
1970	123		−22.6%
1980	101		−17.9%
1990	63		−37.6%
2000	42		−33.3%
2010	30		−28.6%
2020	15		−50.0%
2025 (est.)	18		20.0%
U.S. Decennial Census; 2020 Census

=== 2020 census ===
As of the 2020 census, there were 15 people, 16 households, and 11 families residing in the city.

=== 2010 census ===
As of the 2010 census, there were 30 people, 17 households, and 8 families residing in the city. The population density was 32.6 inhabitants per square mile (12.6/km^{2}). There were 33 housing units at an average density of 35.9 per square mile (13.9/km^{2}). The racial makeup of the city was 100.0% White.

There were 17 households, of which 11.8% had children under the age of 18 living with them, 47.1% were married couples living together, and 52.9% were non-families. 35.3% of all households were made up of individuals, and 11.8% had someone living alone who was 65 years of age or older. The average household size was 1.76 and the average family size was 2.13.

The median age in the city was 57 years. 6.7% of residents were under the age of 18; 6.6% were between the ages of 18 and 24; 20% were from 25 to 44; 46.7% were from 45 to 64; and 20% were 65 years of age or older. The gender makeup of the city was 50.0% male and 50.0% female.

=== 2000 census ===
As of the 2000 census, there were 42 people, 24 households, and 10 families residing in the city. The population density was 45.3 inhabitants per square mile (17.5/km^{2}). There were 38 housing units at an average density of 41.0 per square mile (15.8/km^{2}). The racial makeup of the city was 97.62% White, and 2.38% from two or more races.

There were 24 households, out of which 12.5% had children under the age of 18 living with them, 37.5% were married couples living together, 8.3% had a female householder with no husband present, and 54.2% were non-families. 54.2% of all households were made up of individuals, and 29.2% had someone living alone who was 65 years of age or older. The average household size was 1.75 and the average family size was 2.64.

In the city, the population was spread out, with 14.3% under the age of 18, 2.4% from 18 to 24, 14.3% from 25 to 44, 40.5% from 45 to 64, and 28.6% who were 65 years of age or older. The median age was 52 years. For every 100 females, there were 100.0 males. For every 100 females age 18 and over, there were 89.5 males.

The median income for a household in the city was $14,375, and the median income for a family was $16,875. Males had a median income of $30,625 versus $26,875 for females. The per capita income for the city was $13,752. There were 22.2% of families and 21.4% of the population living below the poverty line, including no under eighteens and 30.0% of those over 64.

== Notable people ==
- Harlan F. Hagen (1914–1990), American lawyer and World War II veteran who served as a United States representative from California, Born in Lawton.
