= Franklin Orth =

American lawyer

Franklin Lewis Orth
- Born: May 11, 1907; Milwaukee, Wisconsin, U.S.
- Died: January 4, 1970 (aged 62); Bethesda, Maryland, U.S.
- Education: University of Wisconsin–Madison
- Occupations: Attorney, non-profit organization executive
- Known for: Executive vice president of the National Rifle Association of America; President of United States Olympic Committee

Franklin Lewis Orth (May 11, 1907 – January 4, 1970) was an American attorney who served as Executive Vice President of the National Rifle Association of America (NRA) from 1959 until his death. In the 1960s, Orth was influential during debates on gun control in the United States. Orth also served as President of the United States Olympic Committee from April 1969 until his death.

== Early life ==
Orth was born in Milwaukee, Wisconsin, in 1907. He earned a bachelor's degree from the University of Wisconsin–Madison in 1928 and a law degree from the University of Wisconsin Law School in 1931. Orth served as an officer in the United States Army during World War II, rising to the rank of colonel. Orth served on the staff of General Frank Merrill, whose unit, popularly known as Merrill's Marauders, was famous for its operations in the jungles of Burma.

== Career ==
After the war, Orth worked for the Federal government, serving in positions at the Department of Veterans' Affairs, the Bureau of Internal Revenue, and the Office of Price Stabilization. He later served as Deputy Assistant Secretary of the Army.

In 1959, Orth accepted a position at the National Rifle Association, where he would remain for the rest of his life. The NRA was apolitical and primarily concerned with promoting marksmanship and recreational shooting. During Orth's tenure, the organization would take on a more active role in legislative debates in response to calls for new, more expansive gun control legislation amidst the political violence of the 1960s. This included the assassinations of U.S. President John F. Kennedy in 1963, Martin Luther King Jr. in April 1968, and U.S. Senator Robert F. Kennedy in June 1968.

Orth was an opponent of gun control measures, but he was more moderate than later NRA leaders. Orth supported banning the inexpensive, often low-quality, handguns known as Saturday night specials. In 1964, he supported limits on mail-order gun purchases, a relevant issue at the time because Lee Harvey Oswald had purchased via mail-order the rifle used in the Kennedy assassination. During the Congressional hearings following Kennedy's death Orth stated, "We do not think that any sane American, who calls himself an American, can object to placing into this bill the instrument which killed the president of the United States."

Orth opposed the 1968 Gun Control Act, but his opposition was tempered. He wrote in the American Rifleman that while some parts of the law "appear unduly restrictive and unjustified in their application to law-abiding citizens, the measure as a whole appears to be one that the sportsmen of America can live with."

In April 1969, Orth was elected president of the United States Olympic Committee and served as its president until his death.

== Personal life ==
He died of a heart attack on January 4, 1970, in Bethesda, Maryland.
