= Neal Knox =

American activist

Clifford Neal Knox
- Born: Clifford Neal Knox; June 20, 1935; Rush Springs, Oklahoma
- Died: January 17, 2005 (aged 69); Manassas, Virginia
- Other names: Neal Knox
- Occupations: Writer, editor, and publisher
- Known for: Gun Rights Activism

Clifford Neal Knox (June 20, 1935 – January 17, 2005) was a board member and officer of the National Rifle Association of America (NRA), gun magazine writer and editor, gun rights activist, and prolific author of technical firearms articles and articles related to his interpretation of the Second Amendment and views on firearms laws.

== Early life ==
Born in Rush Springs, Oklahoma and raised in Texas, Knox served eight years in the Texas National Guard and attended Abilene Christian College, now Abilene Christian University, and Midwestern State University in Wichita Falls. He also began what would become a long career as a freelance writer and columnist; he started as a reporter for the Vernon Daily Record before he moved on to the Times Record News in Wichita Falls.

== Career ==
As an independent writer, Knox sold several articles to gun magazines including Guns & Ammo and Guns magazine between 1964 and 1966. He formally entered the firearms journalism trade in 1966, when he became the founding editor of Gun Week, a weekly newspaper covering firearms issues of the day. The paper gave in-depth coverage to the bill that would eventually become the Gun Control Act of 1968. Knox left Gun Week in 1968, when he moved to Wolfe Publishing/as editor of Handloader Magazine and founding editor of Rifle Magazine.

In 1978, Knox moved to Washington, D.C. in order to lobby against gun control measures and work for the National Rifle Association. He served four years as the executive director of the Institute for Legislative Action (ILA), the lobbying arm of the NRA. At the ILA, Knox was instrumental in convincing friendly lawmakers to introduce a reform of the 1968 Act. The bill became the Firearm Owners Protection Act, which eventually passed in 1986.

From 1984 to his death, Knox was the chairman of the Firearms Coalition, an organization that he created, which lobbies against restrictive gun laws.

== Political activism ==
One of the recurring themes throughout Knox's career was his uncompromising stance on gun laws and the 2nd Amendment, which he believed recognizes a pre-existing human right to self-defense. His views would lead him into many confrontations with other members of the NRA leadership and Congressional leadership. Knox publicly accused many NRA leaders of being too moderate. In 1977, Knox was among the hardliners who took control of the NRA during the Revolt at Cincinnati.

The same hardliners fired Knox from the NRA five years later in 1982. Over the ensuing decade, Knox used his own columns in magazines popular with NRA members like Shotgun News and Guns & Ammo to get himself and up to 10 allies elected to the NRA board in 1991.

In 1997, a narrowly divided NRA Board voted Knox out of the succession line for president of the NRA, replacing him with Charlton Heston, who was subsequently elected president of the organization.

== Death ==
Knox died in 2005, aged 69, after a year-long struggle with colon cancer.

His son, Jeff Knox, continues the Knox Report column, which is published in Shotgun News (now rebranded as Firearms News) and elsewhere. Another son, Chris Knox, has compiled and edited a collection of his writing, Neal Knox: The Gun Rights War.
