= Camp Crook, South Dakota =

- Town
- Location in Harding County and the state of South Dakota
- Coordinates: 45°33′00″N 103°58′30″W
- Country: United States
- State: South Dakota
- County: Harding
- Incorporated: 1908
- Named for: George Crook

Area
  - Total: 0.14 sq mi (0.36 km^{2})
  - Land: 0.14 sq mi (0.36 km^{2})
  - Water: 0 sq mi (0.00 km^{2})
- Elevation: 3,124 ft (952 m)

Population (2020)
  - Total: 60
  - Density: 430.1/sq mi (166.07/km^{2})
- Time zone: UTC-7 (Mountain (MST))
  - Summer (DST): UTC-6 (MDT)
- ZIP code: 57724
- Area code: 605
- FIPS code: 46-09260
- GNIS feature ID: 1267307

Camp Crook is an incorporated small town in Harding County, South Dakota, United States, on the Little Missouri River. The population was 60 at the 2020 census.

The town celebrated 125 years of existence in August 2008 during the annual county fair. It is the only town west of the Little Missouri River in South Dakota. The Custer National Forest, with its Sioux Ranger District office, also celebrated 100 years of having a presence in Camp Crook in 2008.

== History ==
The town's name honors George Crook, a United States Army officer.

== Geography ==
Camp Crook is located at 45°32′59″N 103°58′31″W (45.549727, -103.975307).

According to the United States Census Bureau, the town has a total area of 0.14 square miles (0.36 km^{2}), all land.

Camp Crook has been assigned the ZIP code 57724 and the FIPS place code 09260.

== Demographics ==
Historical population
Census	Pop.	Note	%±
1910	120		—
1920	163		35.8%
1930	161		−1.2%
1940	227		41.0%
1950	122		−46.3%
1960	90		−26.2%
1970	150		66.7%
1980	100		−33.3%
1990	146		46.0%
2000	56		−61.6%
2010	63		12.5%
2020	60		−4.8%
U.S. Decennial Census

=== 2010 census ===
As of the census of 2010, there were 63 people, 32 households, and 17 families residing in the town. The population density was 450.0 inhabitants per square mile (173.7/km^{2}). There were 46 housing units at an average density of 328.6 per square mile (126.9/km^{2}). The racial makeup of the town was 100.0% White. Hispanic or Latino of any race were 1.6% of the population.

There were 32 households, of which 21.9% had children under the age of 18 living with them, 40.6% were married couples living together, 12.5% had a female householder with no husband present, and 46.9% were non-families. 40.6% of all households were made up of individuals, and 12.6% had someone living alone who was 65 years of age or older. The average household size was 1.97 and the average family size was 2.59.

The median age in the town was 48.5 years. 19% of residents were under the age of 18; 1.7% were between the ages of 18 and 24; 22.2% were from 25 to 44; 47.5% were from 45 to 64; and 9.5% were 65 years of age or older. The gender makeup of the town was 46.0% male and 54.0% female.

=== 2000 census ===
As of the census of 2000, there were 56 people, 28 households, and 15 families residing in the town. The population density was 406.4 inhabitants per square mile (156.9/km^{2}). There were 51 housing units at an average density of 370.1 per square mile (142.9/km^{2}). The racial makeup of the town was 98.21% White and 1.79% Native American.

There were 28 households, out of which 21.4% had children under the age of 18 living with them, 46.4% were married couples living together, 10.7% had a female householder with no husband present, and 42.9% were non-families. 39.3% of all households were made up of individuals, and 7.1% had someone living alone who was 65 years of age or older. The average household size was 2.00 and the average family size was 2.69.

In the town, the population was spread out, with 19.6% under the age of 18, 3.6% from 18 to 24, 26.8% from 25 to 44, 44.6% from 45 to 64, and 5.4% who were 65 years of age or older. The median age was 45 years. For every 100 females, there were 93.1 males. For every 100 females age 18 and over, there were 87.5 males.

As of 2000, the median income for a household in the town was $31,875, and the median income for a family was $33,750. Males had a median income of $29,375 versus $21,875 for females. The per capita income for the town was $30,178. There were 18.2% of families and 17.1% of the population living below the poverty line, including 33.3% of under eighteens and none of those over 64.

== Climate ==
Camp Crook experiences a semi-arid climate (Köppen BSk) with cold, dry winters, and hot, wetter summers.

Climate data for Camp Crook, South Dakota (1991–2020 normals, extremes 1893–present)
Month	Jan	Feb	Mar	Apr	May	Jun	Jul	Aug	Sep	Oct	Nov	Dec	Year
Record high °F (°C)	69 (21)	72 (22)	82 (28)	94 (34)	101 (38)	108 (42)	113 (45)	114 (46)	105 (41)	95 (35)	84 (29)	70 (21)	114 (46)
Mean maximum °F (°C)	52.9 (11.6)	54.8 (12.7)	69.0 (20.6)	78.2 (25.7)	84.8 (29.3)	92.7 (33.7)	98.9 (37.2)	98.1 (36.7)	94.3 (34.6)	81.7 (27.6)	67.3 (19.6)	54.0 (12.2)	101.0 (38.3)
Mean daily maximum °F (°C)	33.5 (0.8)	36.5 (2.5)	47.7 (8.7)	58.3 (14.6)	68.6 (20.3)	78.8 (26.0)	88.4 (31.3)	87.5 (30.8)	77.8 (25.4)	61.1 (16.2)	46.2 (7.9)	35.5 (1.9)	60.0 (15.6)
Daily mean °F (°C)	22.0 (−5.6)	24.6 (−4.1)	34.7 (1.5)	44.7 (7.1)	55.1 (12.8)	65.0 (18.3)	72.8 (22.7)	71.1 (21.7)	61.2 (16.2)	47.0 (8.3)	34.0 (1.1)	24.4 (−4.2)	46.4 (8.0)
Mean daily minimum °F (°C)	10.5 (−11.9)	12.8 (−10.7)	21.7 (−5.7)	31.2 (−0.4)	41.5 (5.3)	51.2 (10.7)	57.3 (14.1)	54.7 (12.6)	44.6 (7.0)	32.9 (0.5)	21.7 (−5.7)	13.3 (−10.4)	32.8 (0.4)
Mean minimum °F (°C)	−18.3 (−27.9)	−12.3 (−24.6)	−3.2 (−19.6)	13.6 (−10.2)	25.5 (−3.6)	37.9 (3.3)	45.2 (7.3)	40.2 (4.6)	28.4 (−2.0)	13.2 (−10.4)	−2.0 (−18.9)	−12.2 (−24.6)	−26.1 (−32.3)
Record low °F (°C)	−57 (−49)	−50 (−46)	−38 (−39)	−12 (−24)	4 (−16)	24 (−4)	32 (0)	27 (−3)	9 (−13)	−17 (−27)	−28 (−33)	−46 (−43)	−57 (−49)
Average precipitation inches (mm)	0.31 (7.9)	0.45 (11)	0.70 (18)	1.61 (41)	2.87 (73)	2.91 (74)	2.06 (52)	1.60 (41)	1.19 (30)	1.27 (32)	0.48 (12)	0.34 (8.6)	15.79 (401)
Average snowfall inches (cm)	7.6 (19)	9.3 (24)	8.7 (22)	6.5 (17)	2.1 (5.3)	0.0 (0.0)	0.0 (0.0)	0.0 (0.0)	0.1 (0.25)	3.2 (8.1)	5.9 (15)	7.1 (18)	50.5 (128)
Average precipitation days (≥ 0.01 in)	5.0	5.5	5.7	7.3	10.1	10.9	8.5	6.4	5.3	5.9	4.6	5.0	80.2
Average snowy days (≥ 0.1 in)	4.3	4.7	3.8	2.4	0.4	0.0	0.0	0.0	0.1	1.2	3.0	4.1	24.0
Source: NOAA
