= Garrison Forest School =

Girls school in Owings Mills, Maryland, US

Location
- Owings Mills, Maryland; United States; 39°24′38.52″N 76°45′49.14″W

Information
- Motto: Esse quam videri (To Be Rather Than To Seem)
- Established: 1910
- Founder: Mary Moncrieffe Livingston
- Head teacher: Ann Teaff (2025-present)
- Grades: Daycare–12
- Gender: Girls (K-12); Co-ed (age 6 weeks to PK)
- Enrollment: 555
- Colors: Light and dark blue
- Song: "Alma Mater" (to the tune of "God, the Omnipotent!")
- Team name: Garrison Grizzlies
- Accreditations: MSA, AIMS
- Yearbook: Ragged Robins
- Website: www.gfs.org

Garrison Forest School (GFS) is a non-denominational private college preparatory boarding and day school located on a 110 acres (45 ha) campus in Owings Mills, Maryland. GFS offers kindergarten through 12th grade for girls as well as a co-educational early childhood program. The school is accredited by the Middle States Association of Colleges and Secondary Schools and the Association of Independent Maryland Schools.

== History ==
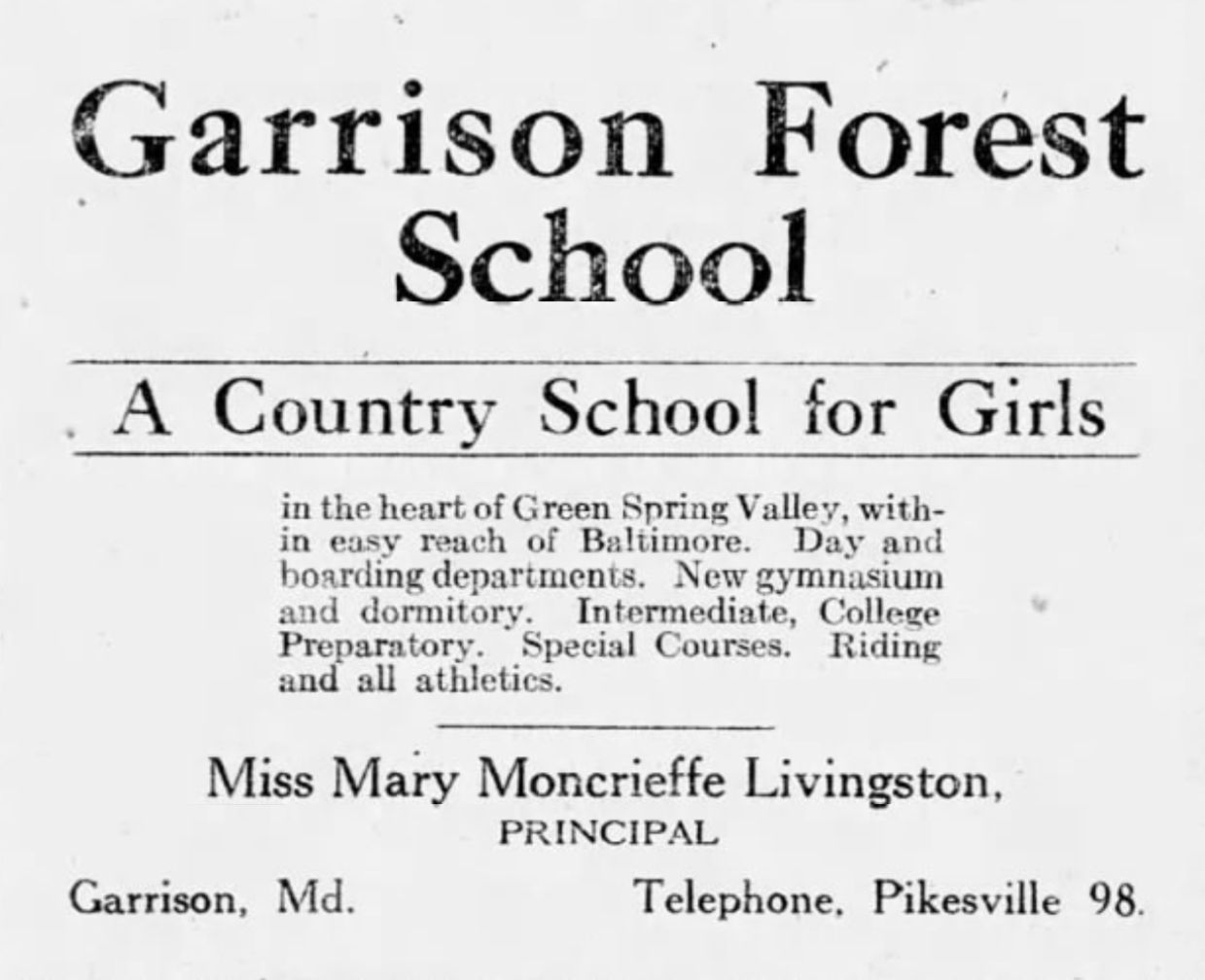
Advertisement for GFS in a 1920 edition of the Baltimore Sun

Garrison Forest was established by Mary Moncrieffe Livingston (1869-1956), the head of a day school in Kingston, New York, in 1910. She had previously visited Baltimore to visit her sister and brother-in-law and was invited by the community to start a co-ed school. The school she set up was located in a house off of Reisterstown Road in the Green Spring Valley Historic District. At its start, the primary school was co-ed while high school was for female students only. Within two years of opening, Livingston purchased an additional 9 acres (3.6 ha) of land and expanded the school's facilities, including the addition of a stable. By 1916, the school had 40 students total; in 1920, five students graduated from GFS.

Livingston served as the first headmistress from the school's inception until her retirement in 1929. She was followed by co-headmistresses Jean Marshall and Nancy Offutt, who started the school's riding program and oversaw the school until 1960. They were replaced by Archibald Montgomery IV, the first headmaster. In 1961, the school grounds had expanded to 85 acres (34 ha), with two gymnasiums and two dormitories among the buildings. At this time, there were 300 students between ages 10 and 18 and the school had about 1,000 alumni. Montgomery was replaced in 1968 by Lawrence Hlavacek. Under Hlavacek, the school bought a 142 acres (57 ha) farm near Butler with the intention of developing it into a new campus, but eventually sold the site and returned to developing the existing campus. At this time, they were also discussing merging with St. Timothy's School and McDonogh School, but instead decided to merge with the nearby Valley School, a co-ed PK to sixth grade school, in 1975. By the time Hlavacek retired in 1978, the school enrollment was up to 407, 75 of which were boarders.

Aggie Underwood served as headmistress from 1978-1989; Alexander Uhle was interim headmaster from 1989-1990; and Midge Bowman held this role from 1990-1994. She was succeeded by G. Peter O'Neill, Jr., who began as an interim head before taking on the position permanently. O'Neill oversaw major campus expansion and established an academic partnership with Johns Hopkins University. GFS reached an all-time high enrollment of 596 students under him in 1999. He retired in 2014, making him the second-longest serving school head at 20 years, with Marshall and Offutt having worked 31. He was replaced by Kimberly Roberts (2014-2017). Next was interim head Lila Boyce Lohr (2017-2018), who graduated from GFS in 1963, followed by Christopher Hughes (2018–2025), and succeeded by interim head Ann Teaff (2025–present). In 2019, an anonymous donor gave $5 million to the school, the largest donation in GFS history. The donation was used to renovate the main Upper School Building and library and to construct a new dormitory. As of the 2021/2022 academic year, 555 students were enrolled.

== Academics and extracurriculars ==
The student to faculty ratio at Garrison Forest is about 7:1. Many of the academic and supplemental activities and programs at GFS center on the natural world, lab science, and community engagement. The area around campus is wooded and is used as an outdoor classroom. There is also a beekeeping club to take care of the two bee colonies introduced to campus in 2018 with a grant from the Central Maryland Beekeeping Association.

In 2004, O'Neill worked to create the Women in Science and Engineering (WISE) program, which allowed upperclassmen to work in labs at Johns Hopkins University twice a week for 15 weeks. GFS students are mentored by faculty and graduate students while they conduct research. In 2017, GFS was chosen as one of six schools nationwide to pilot a lab-based course from Small World Initiative.

During World War II, students at Garrison Forest started the Service League, a student-led community outreach program. Examples of affiliated charities and organizations include Ruth's Closet (House of Ruth), Women for Afghan Women, and the Baltimore Humane Society. Since 2005, the GFS faculty, staff, and administrators have sponsored a Habitat for Humanity house in Baltimore, an annual project that grew out of the school's initial reaction to Hurricane Katrina. The first GFS Habitat house was given to a family who relocated from New Orleans to Baltimore post-hurricane. GFS also offers the Jenkins Fellow program, a summerlong service project fellowship that can take place in the United States or abroad.

The Lower School has had a financial competency curriculum, which includes visits from financial experts and virtual stock market trading games, at its core since 2015. Seventh graders at the Middle School participate in a Shark Tank-inspired group project where they create and pitch innovative ideas.

The 25-student Middle School chorus was invited by the Distinguished Concerts International New York to perform at Carnegie Hall in 2016 in as part of a 200-person choir. They have also won first place Women's Choir during the Music in the Parks festival at Hershey Park several times, including annually between 2010-2015 and 2024-2025. GFS' a capella group is called the Ragged Robins after the school flower.

== Campus life ==
=== Boarding ===
Eighth grade and high school students have the option to live on campus in one of three residence halls. About 27% of the student population boards.

=== Athletics ===
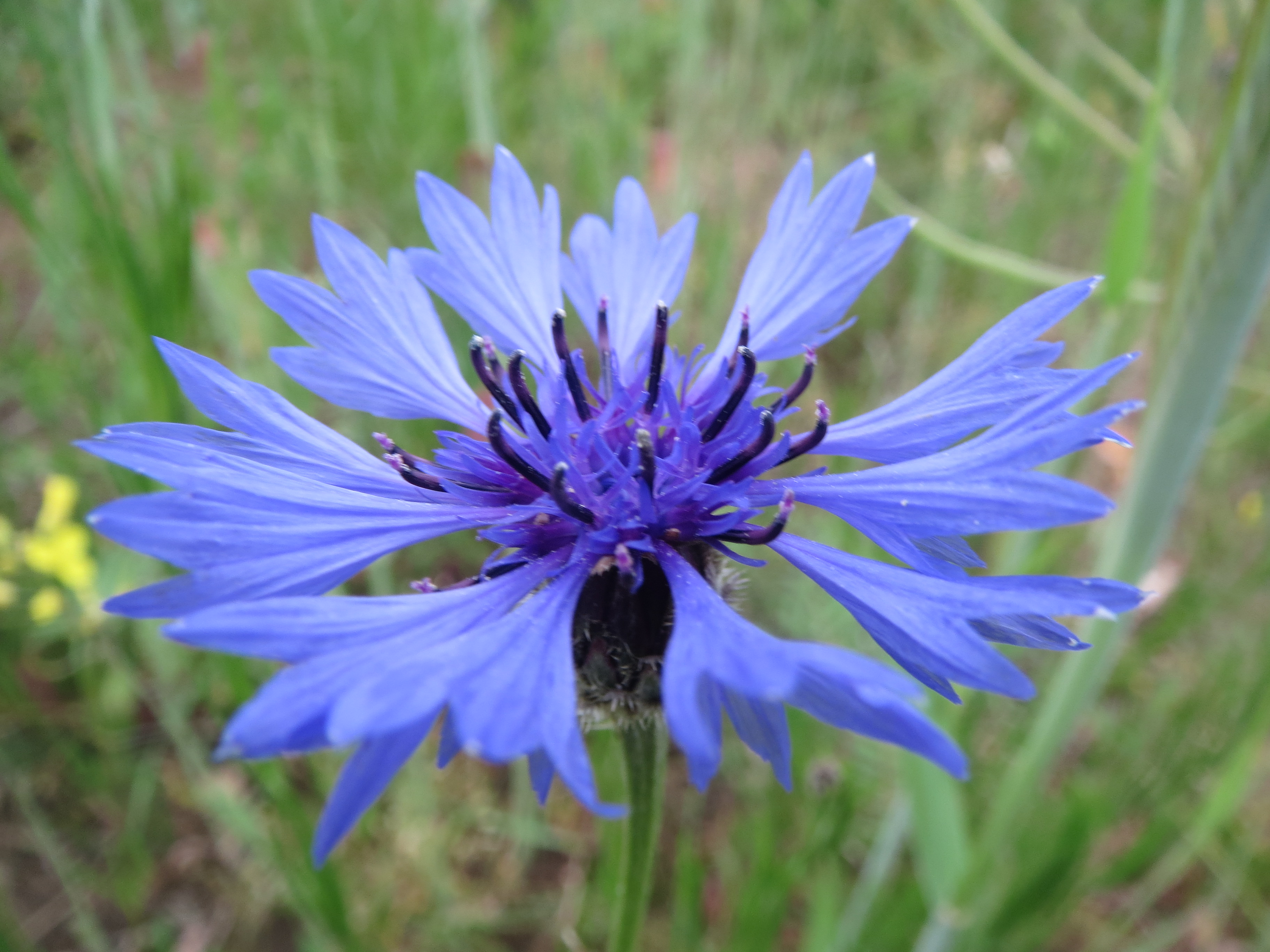
The school flower, Centaurea cyanus, also called the ragged robin

Athletics have been a crucial part of the CFS curriculum since its foundation. For most of its history (1919-1993), GFS was part of the Maryland Scholastic Association until public high schools left the league to join the statewide Maryland Public Secondary Schools Athletic Association, for which GFS was not eligible. The school is now part of the Interscholastic Athletic Association of Maryland and boasts 48 teams across 16 sports, not including their dance, riding or polo teams. On-campus facilities include an equestrian center with more than 15 paddocks; a show and event area; an indoor polo ring; four athletic fields, two of which are turf; six tennis courts; and the Elizabeth B. Searle '74 Athletic Center, which was opened in 2002.

One of the earliest intramural sports at GFS was soccer, which was introduced in 1931 and acknowledged by the Baltimore Sun as the "only girls' institution in this vicinity known to teach soccer in the spring." A cow pasture on campus was converted into a hockey field; in its early days, before GFS had other teams to play, students competed with faculty. GFS added mountain biking as a fall sport and joined the Maryland Interscholastic Cycling League in 2018. The school also participates in equestrian sports such as equitation, showjumping, and eventing, in addition to their championship polo team.

The GFS polo program was started in 1979 by Martha Williams's father. The team competes as part of the United States Polo Association’s Interscholastic Division and is recognized as the only girls' school in the United States to offer the sport. As such, GFS polo players compete against both co-ed and male teams from high schools, colleges, and local clubs. Between 1979 and 2017, the polo team had won 13 championships. Between 1995 and 2012, six players had won the Polo Training Foundation's Interscholastic Player of the Year Award.

=== Traditions ===
Upon enrollment, high school students are split into two spirit teams: light blue or dark blue. At graduation, students wear white formal clothing and are given a bouquet of ragged-robins, the school flower, to carry during the commencement ceremony.

== In media ==
The 1990 film Metropolitan refers to Garrison Forest as "one of those horsey girls' schools."

== Notable graduates ==
- Louise Serpa, class of 1943 - rodeo photographer
- Sheila Isham, class of 1945 - artist
- Adele Simmons, class of 1945 - academic, former president of Hampshire College and MacArthur Foundation
- Flo Smith Stone, class of 1956 - founder of the Environmental Film Festival in the Nation's Capital and the Margaret Mead Film Festival
- Alexandra Creel Goelet, class of 1958 - heiress, forester
- Wendy Watriss, class of 1960 - photographer, journalist, curator, artistic director
- Jane Tuckerman - photographer
- Marty Moss-Coane, class of 1967 - host and executive producer of Radio Times
- Cricket Hooper Jiranek, class of 1977 - multiple Tony Award winner, Broadway producer
- Carol Graham, class of 1980 - author, Leo Pasvolsky Senior Fellow at the Brookings Institution
- Patricia E. Campbell-Smith, class of 1983 - United States Court of Federal Claims judge, first African American judge appointed as Chief Judge
- Sarah LeBrun Ingram, class of 1984 - amateur golfer
- Martha Williams, class of 1985 - Principal Deputy Director of the United States Fish and Wildlife Service, former/first woman to be Director of the Montana Department of Fish, Wildlife and Parks
- Alyson Grine, class of 1988 - North Carolina Superior Court judge; first woman to be a judge in the district and the only openly LGBTQ+ judge in the state upon her 2021 appointment
- Sara Naomi Bleich, class of 1996 - noteworthy American psychologist and academic
- Beth Botsford, class of 1999 - double gold medalist swimmer in the 1996 Summer Olympics
- Jamie O'Brien, class of 2006 - television host and former Miss Maryland Teen USA
