= Sam Hamilton =

American politician (1955–2010)

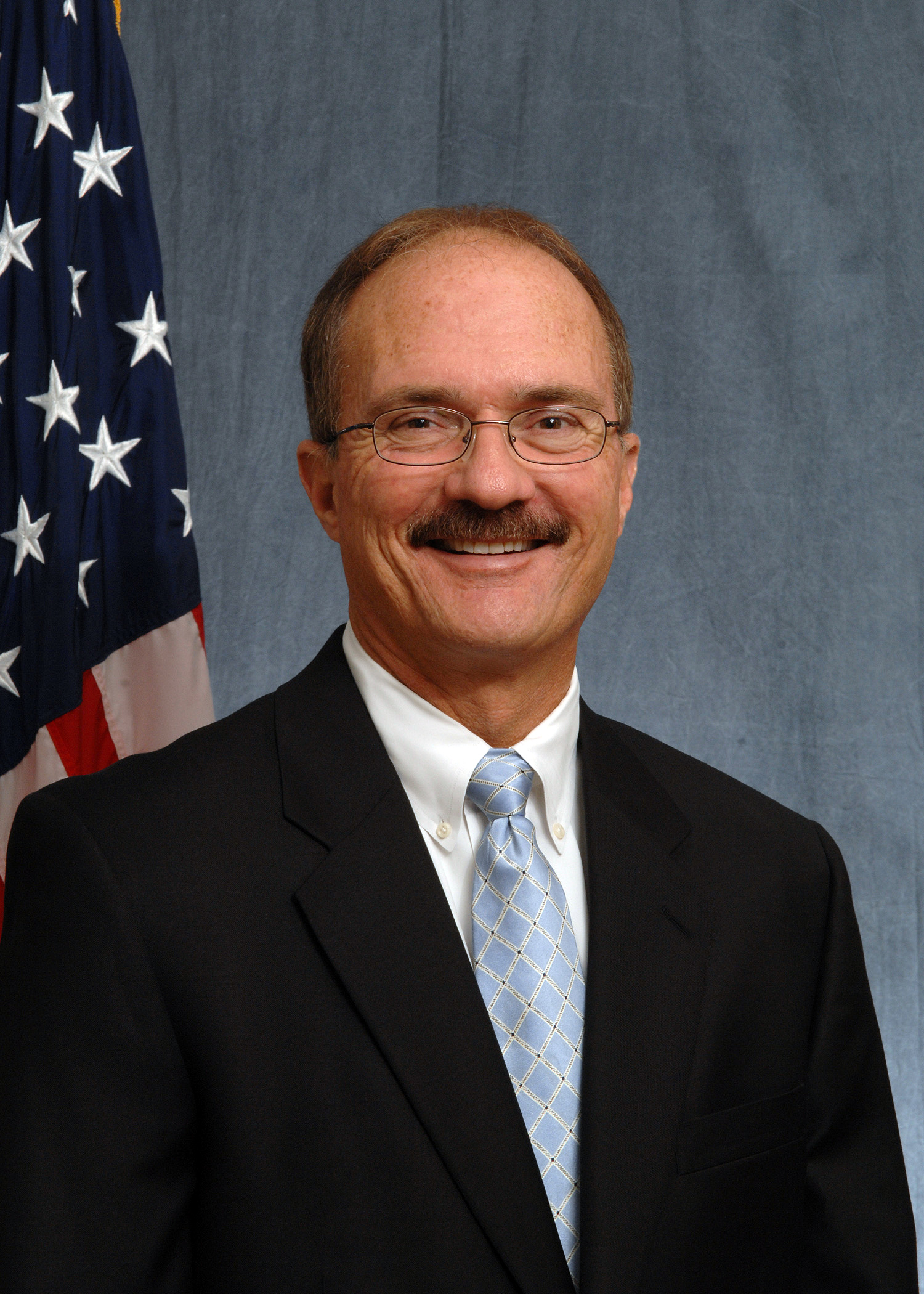

15th Director of the United States Fish and Wildlife Service
- In office September 1, 2009 – February 20, 2010
- President: Barack Obama
- Preceded by: H. Dale Hall
- Succeeded by: Daniel Ashe

Personal details
- Born: July 5, 1955 Lawrenceville, Georgia
- Died: February 20, 2010 (aged 54) Keystone, Colorado
- Education: Mississippi State University

Sam D. Hamilton (July 5, 1955 – February 20, 2010) was the 15th director of the United States Fish and Wildlife Service from September 1, 2009, until February 20, 2010.

Hamilton, a native of Lawrenceville, Georgia, received his bachelor's degree from Mississippi State University in 1977.

Prior to his appointment as Director of the United States Fish and Wildlife Service, Hamilton served as the agency's southeast regional director, based in Atlanta, Georgia. Hamilton was credited with leading the restoration efforts in the Florida Everglades. He also oversaw coastal fort restoration efforts along the Gulf of Mexico following Hurricane Katrina and Hurricane Rita, both of which damaged wildlife refuges, wetlands and other habitats.

He was appointed the director of the United States Fish and Wildlife Service in 2009 and was sworn in on September 15, 2009. As director, Hamilton oversaw 8,700 employees who are responsible for nearly 150,000,000 acres (610,000 km^{2}), including approximately 550 national wildlife refuges nationwide.

Hamilton had a wife, Becky and the couple had two sons, Sam Jr. and Clay. He died on February 20, 2010, after he suffered a heart attack while skiing at the Keystone Resort in Keystone, Colorado. In February 2012, the Noxubee National Wildlife Refuge, was renamed to Sam D. Hamilton Noxubee National Wildlife Refuge in honor of Hamilton.
