= Leo Giacometto =

American soldier, politician, and lobbyist (1962–2022)

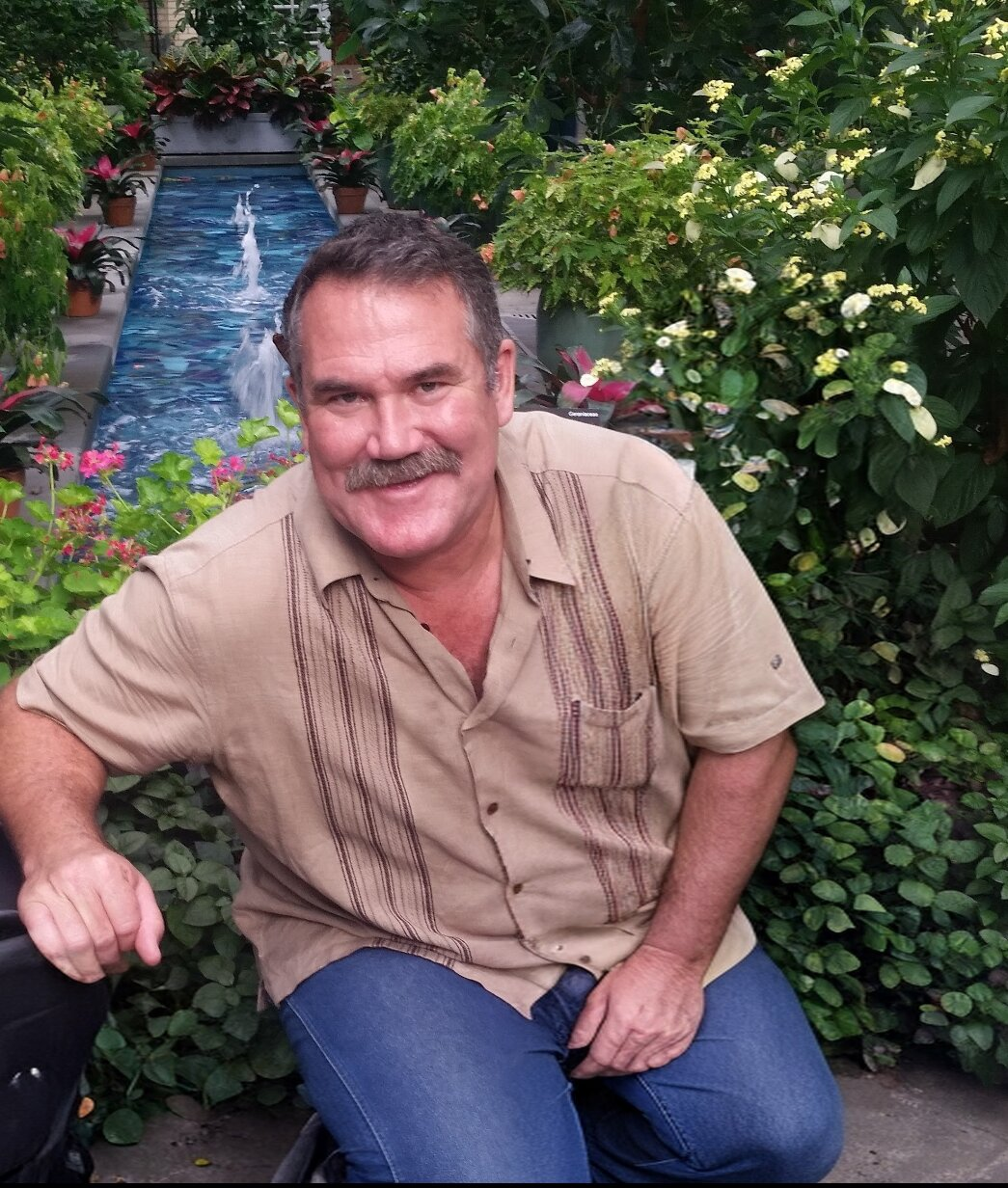
- Leo Giacometto at the United States Botanic Garden in Washington D.C. in 2015
- Born: Leo Anthony Giacometto; May 14, 1962; Belle Fourche, S. Dakota, US
- Died: August 8, 2022 (aged 60); Bahrain
- Burial place: Alzada, Montana, US
- Occupations: Soldier; politician; lobbyist
- Spouse: Mildred Echeverria (m. 1981; div. 2007) Aurelia Skipwith (m. 2021)
- Children: Two
- Military career
- Branch: United States Army; United States Army Reserve
- Years: 1980–2003
- Rank: Lieutenant colonel

Montana representative to the Northwest Power and Conservation Council
- In office 2001–2002
- Governor: Judy Martz

Director of the Montana Department of Agriculture
- In office 1993–1995
- Governor: Marc Racicot

Member of the Montana House of Representatives
- In office 1987–1990

Leo Anthony Giacometto (May 14, 1962 – August 8, 2022) was an American US Army officer, politician, and lobbyist.

== Personal life ==
Leo Anthony Giacometto was born on May 14, 1962, in Belle Fourche, South Dakota, to Sondra Floyd and Leo Eugene Giacometto. He grew up in Alzada, Montana, on a sheep ranch, representing the seventh generation of his family in southeastern Montana.

While stationed with the United States Army in Panama, Giacometto met Mildred Echeverria. The couple married on August 16, 1981. Following the completion of his military service in Panama in 1982, they relocated to the family ranch in Alzada, Montana, purchasing the property from his parents, Leo Eugene and Sondra Giacometto. While operating the ranch, he also served his local community directly as the Carter County magistrate. Following his election to the Montana House of Representatives in 1986, Giacometto relocated his family to Billings, Montana, in late 1988 to work on Conrad Burns' successful campaign for the U.S. Senate. Giacometto and Echeverria raised two children together, Tasha Marie Giacometto and Leo Cassidy Giacometto, and remained married for twenty-six years until their divorce was finalized in August 2007. Through his children, Giacometto had two grandchildren, Vincenzo and Caitlin.

On September 25, 2021, Giacometto married Aurelia Skipwith, an attorney and former director of the United States Fish and Wildlife Service, in New Orleans. Giacometto died on August 8, 2022, while traveling in Bahrain, and was returned home to be buried on the family ranch in Alzada.

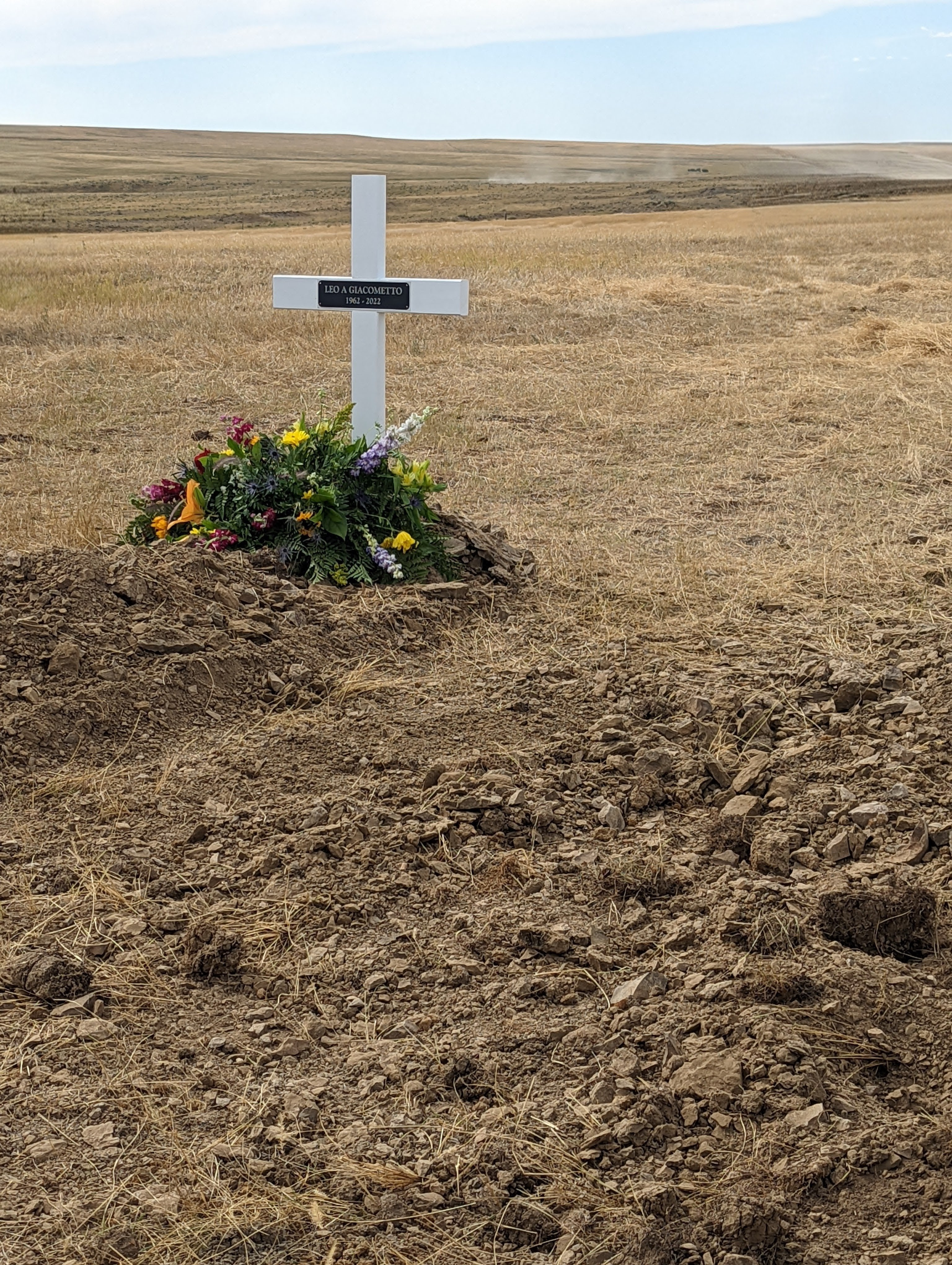
The ranch burial site and grave of Leo Giacometto in Alzada, Montana.

== Career ==
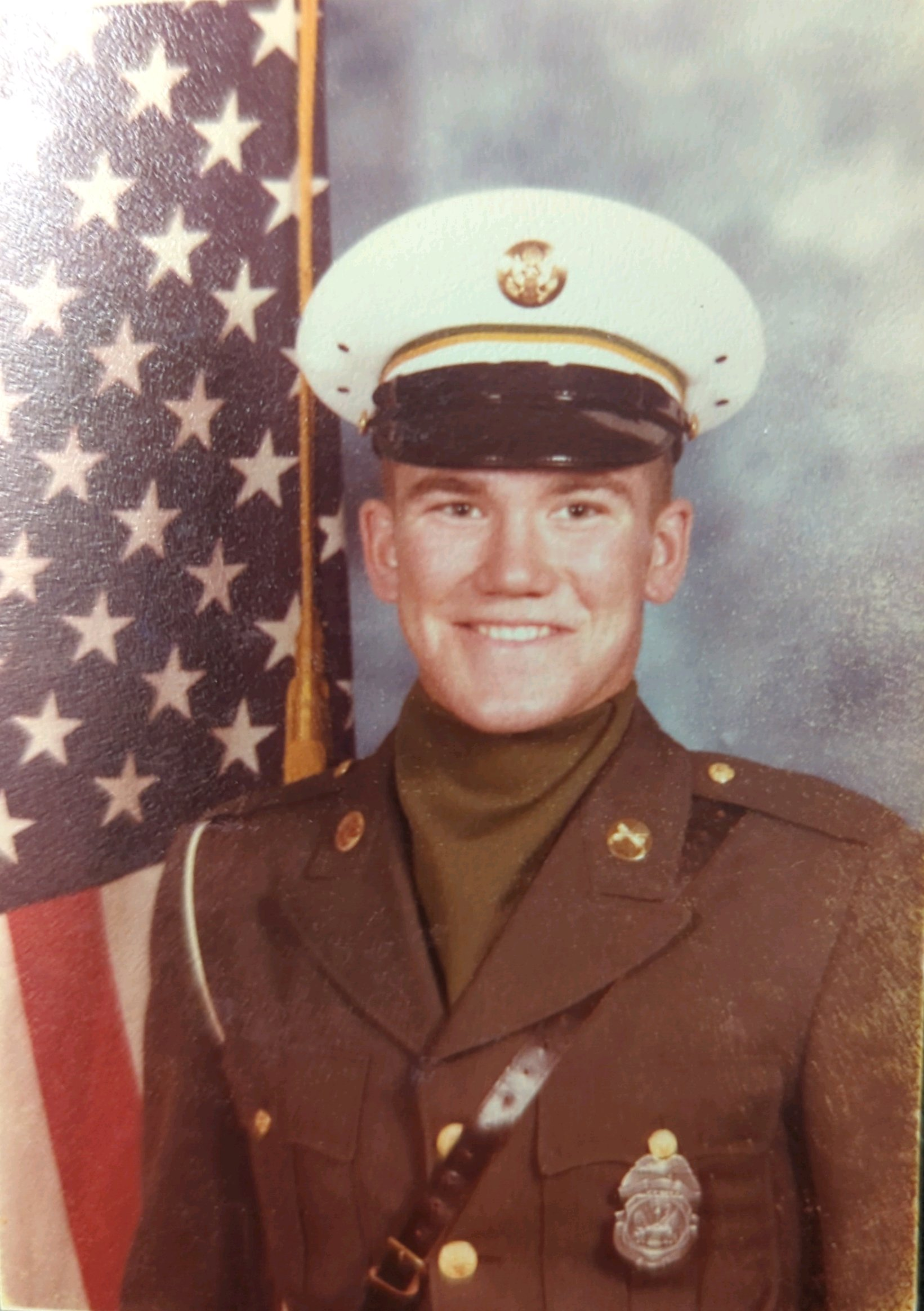
Leo Giacometto during his service in the U.S. Army.

=== Military ===
A graduate of the Montana Military Academy and United States Army Military Police Academy, Giacometto served in the United States Army and Army Reserve from 1980 through 2003 before retiring as a lieutenant colonel.

=== Politics ===
In 1987, Giacometto was elected to the Montana House of Representatives, where he served until 1990.

On February 28, 1990, President George H. W. Bush nominated Giacometto as US marshal for Montana. On April 5, the United States Senate unanimously confirmed him, making Giacometto the then-youngest US marshal in history. He left the Marshals in 1993, before his four-year term was complete. Giacometto was also a magistrate judge.

Giacometto was the Montana Department of Agriculture director from 1993 through 1995 under Governor Marc Racicot.

In 1995, Giacometto became the chief of staff for US Senator Conrad Burns, working out of the Dirksen Senate Office Building. After a national magazine identified Giacometto as the single congressional staffer "who took the most junkets at the expense of industry and other private interests", he left Burns' employ in 1999 to become a lobbyist for Morrison–Knudsen.

Upon the election of Governor Judy Martz, she appointed Giacometto to one Montana's two seats on the Northwest Power and Conservation Council (NPCC), where he annually earned US$87,600 (equivalent to $159,280 in 2025). In 2001, Giacometto submitted a falsified travel invoice in connection with his appointed duties, for which he was being prosecuted in 2002 by the Lewis and Clark county attorney; he was acquitted of the misdemeanor in January 2001 by a six-member jury. That August, Giacometto was the first person at the scene of the drunk-driving crash that killed Montana Representative Paul Sliter, and was seen "trying to hide beer cans and bottles that had spilled from [Shane] Hedges' wrecked pickup, in which Sliter had been riding." Giacometto was also the subject of investigation by Lewis and Clark County law enforcement officers for allegedly threatening Missoulian columnist Mary Jo Fox (through state senator John Harp) for an article critical of the governor. Giacometto left the NPCC seat in March 2002.

=== Civilian ===
In 1999, Giacometto became the vice president of government affairs for both Washington Group International (until 2001) and Morrison–Knudsen. In 2005, he was a lobbyist for the Vector Group.
