= Martha Williams =

Martha Williams may refer to:

- Martha Llwyd, née Williams, Welsh poet and Methodist hymnwriter
- Martha Williams (lawyer), American attorney and government official
