= Noxubee =

Noxubee may refer to:

- Noxubee County, Mississippi
- Noxubee River, in Alabama and Mississippi
- Noxubee National Wildlife Refuge, Mississippi
