= Mollie Beattie Wilderness =

Wilderness area in Alaska, United States

- IUCN category Ib (wilderness area)

- Location within Alaska
- Location: Arctic National Wildlife Refuge North Slope Borough / Yukon-Koyukuk Census Area, Alaska, USA
- Nearest city: Kaktovik, Alaska
- Coordinates: 69°00′53″N 143°12′50″W
- Area: 8,000,000 acres (3,200,000 ha)
- Established: 1980
- Governing body: United States Fish and Wildlife Service

The Mollie Beattie Wilderness is located in the northeastern section of the Arctic National Wildlife Refuge. It is the second-largest designated wilderness area in the United States, after the Wrangell-Saint Elias Wilderness. It has an area of approximately 8,000,000 acres (3,200,000 ha), and comprises over 40 percent of the area of Arctic NWR. Its territory is centered about a part of the Brooks Range that contains a combination of arctic, subarctic, and alpine ecosystems. Animal life is abundant, including that of large mammals such as brown bears, moose, caribou, musk oxen, and (offshore) polar bears and numerous species of whales and seals. The wilderness is named after conservationist Mollie Beattie, the first female director of the United States Fish and Wildlife Service.

== See also ==
- List of largest wilderness areas in the United States
