= Louise Serpa =

American rodeo photographer

- Born: Louise Yandell Larocque; December 15, 1925; New York City
- Died: January 5, 2012 (aged 86); Tucson, Arizona
- Education: Vassar College
- Occupation: Rodeo photographer
- Years active: 1960-2011

Louise Larocque Serpa (December 15, 1925 –January 5, 2012) was an American photographer specializing in rodeo photography. Born in New York City, Serpa became one of the first women allowed into the rodeo area to photograph, which led to a 48-year-long career until her death in 2012.

== Early life and education ==
Louise Yandell Larocque was born in New York City on December 15, 1925 to Louise Yandell Barber and Joseph Larocque, Jr. She first encountered the west as a child, when her mother took her to Reno, Nevada, to get divorced from Serpa's father. There, at nine years old, she was drawn to rodeos. Serpa attended Miss Chapin’s School, which she regarded as being “For small girl snobs" and then Garrison Forest School for high school (1943). She showed her disdain for New York society in her rebellion. For example, during her debut at the Waldorf Astoria, she rode sidesaddle down a bannister, tearing her dress on an uneven joint.

After graduating in 1943, Serpa took a summer job as a ranch hand in Cody, Wyoming, where she met and fell in love with Lex Connelly, one of the founders of the modern rodeo. She returned to the east coast for college, where she obtaining a degree in music from Vassar College (1946). While at Vassar, she kept up with the rodeo by sneaking out of the dormitory to see the rodeo at Madison Square Garden.

== Career ==
After graduating from Vassar, Serpa sang and danced along the East Coast in support of wartime USO programs. She worked as a ticket agent for KLM Royal Dutch Airlines. Feeling that this "proper" life was not for her, she moved to Scottsdale.

In the early 1950s, while living in Oregon, Serpa purchased a camera and taught herself photography. Cowboys bought film, and she took photographs of their ropings so they could examine the photographs and improve.

In 1959 or 1960, Serpa divorced her second husband and moved, with her two daughters, to Tucson, Arizona. Needing money due to her younger daughter's illness, she began photographing children at a junior rodeo competition, selling photographs to parents. She had taught herself to take photographs. Serpa's first magazine cover was for Hoops and Hors in 1962.

In 1963, Serpa was the first woman allowed to be in the rodeo arena to photograph the action shots on film. She was the first woman granted a press card by Rodeo Sports New to be sanctioned by the Rodeo Cowboys Association to photograph inside the arena. On one occasion, Serpa was launched 8 feet into the air by a bull, which additionally rammed her into the ground after she made her way back down to earth, breaking her sternum and some ribs. Serpa remained at the rodeo a little while longer before heading to the hospital, and returned to the rodeo next day. Serpa expanded her expertise to photographing cutting shows and polo matches.

In 1963, Serpa became the official photographer for the Tucson rodeo, a position she kept until 2011. In 1970, she became the first woman allowed on the courses of the prestigious Grand National in England and the first to cover the Dublin Horse Show. In 1975, Serpa photographed the Sydney Royal Easter Show, and is believed to have been the first woman to do so.

In 1982, Bruce Weber encountered Serpa's work while he was shooting an advertising spread in Tucson. He invited her to New York City for a gallery showing of her work, which spread it to a wider audience. Serpa's art has hung in galleries around the world, including in the personal collection of Ralph Lauren.

In 1994, Aperture published a book of Serpa's photographs, Rodeo, with commentary by Larry McMurtry. In 1996, she was the subject of documentary When the Dust Settles. In 2007, University of Arizona Museum of Art exhibited Serpa's work. Included in her portfolio were a number of western landscapes, as well as portraits.

Serpa was a founding member of the Arizona Junior Rodeo Association.

== Personal life ==
Serpa married twice. Her first marriage (1948) was on the East Coast, to Philip DuVal, a man from Yale. The two divorced due to infidelity on her part, but they remained friends throughout her life. After moving to the American West, she met and married Gordon "Tex" Serpa. The two inherited a family a sheep ranch in Ashland, Oregon, where they raised their daughters, Lauren and Mia Serpa. Unhappy with Serpa's lifestyle, her mother disinherited her. After Serpa discovered that her husband was unfaithful, she took the children and headed for Tucson, Arizona.

== Later life ==
Serpa was diagnosed with cancer in 2008, but despite the diagnosis, she continued to photograph. She could no longer enter the ring, instead photographing from a platform rodeo manager Gary Williams built her. Serpa died on January 5, 2012, at the age of 86 due to cancer in her home in Tucson.

== Awards and honors ==
- 1982: Pro Rodeo Cowboys Association trophy buckle for Best Action Photo of the Year from PSN and Frontier Airlines
- 1999: National Cowgirl Hall of Fame
- 2002: Tad Lucas Award from the National Cowboy & Western Heritage Museum
- 2005: Pima County Sports Hall of Fame honored her in 2005
- 2005: PRCA Photographer of the Year
- 2005: PRCA Excellence in Photography Award
- 2006: Grand Marshal of the Tucson Rodeo Parade
- 2017: Arizona Women's Hall of Fame
- Photographer of the Year from the Professional Rodeo Cowboy Association
