= Aurelia Skipwith Giacometto =

American biologist

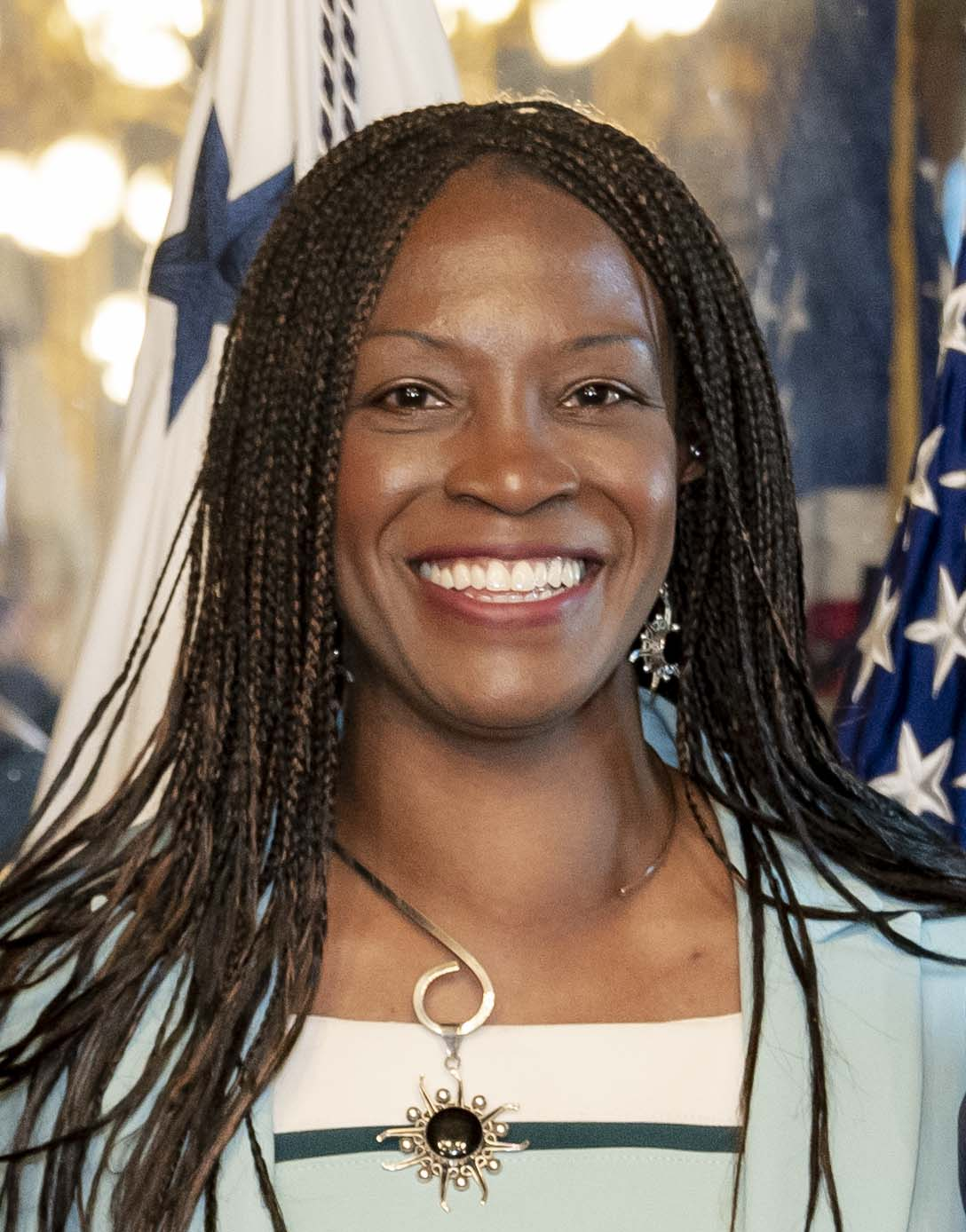
- Skipwith in 2020

Secretary of the Louisiana Department of Environmental Quality
- In office January 2024 – May 2, 2025
- Preceded by: Roger W. Gingles
- Succeeded by: Courtney J. Burdette

17th Director of the United States Fish and Wildlife Service
- In office January 6, 2020 – January 20, 2021
- President: Donald Trump
- Preceded by: Margaret Everson (acting)
- Succeeded by: Martha Williams

Personal details
- Born: Aurelia Skipwith; July 30, 1980 (age 46) Indianapolis, Indiana, U.S.
- Spouse: Leo Giacometto (m. 2021; died 2022)
- Education: Howard University (BS); Purdue University (MS); University of Kentucky (JD)

Aurelia Skipwith Giacometto is an American attorney, businesswoman, and biologist who served as the 17th director of the United States Fish and Wildlife Service from 2019 to 2021. She was confirmed by the Senate as director on December 12, 2019, by a 52–39 vote, and is the first black director of the Fish and Wildlife Service.

== Early life and education ==
Skipwith was born and raised in Indianapolis, Indiana, the oldest of nine children. Skipwith's family eventually relocated to Columbus, Mississippi. Skipwith's father served in the United States Navy and United States Army Reserve. Her grandfather was a farmer in Mississippi.

Skipwith received a Bachelor of Science degree in biology from Howard University in 2003, a Master of Science in molecular genetics from Purdue University, and a Juris Doctor from the University of Kentucky Rosenberg College of Law.

== Early career ==
Skipwith began her career at Monsanto in 2006 as a lab technician, and worked her way to a sustainable agriculture partnership manager. Following her work at Monsanto, Skipwith completed law school and had a brief career as a research and legal intern at the United States Department of Agriculture. She also served as an intellectual property consultant for the United States Agency for International Development.

For a period of time, Skipwith worked at Alltech, an organization based in Nicholasville, Kentucky which specializes in animal nutrition and algae production. She later co-founded AVC Global, an agricultural supply blockchain company in early-2016.

== Trump administration ==
From April 2017 to January 2020, Skipwith served as deputy assistant secretary fish, wildlife and parks of the Department of the Interior.

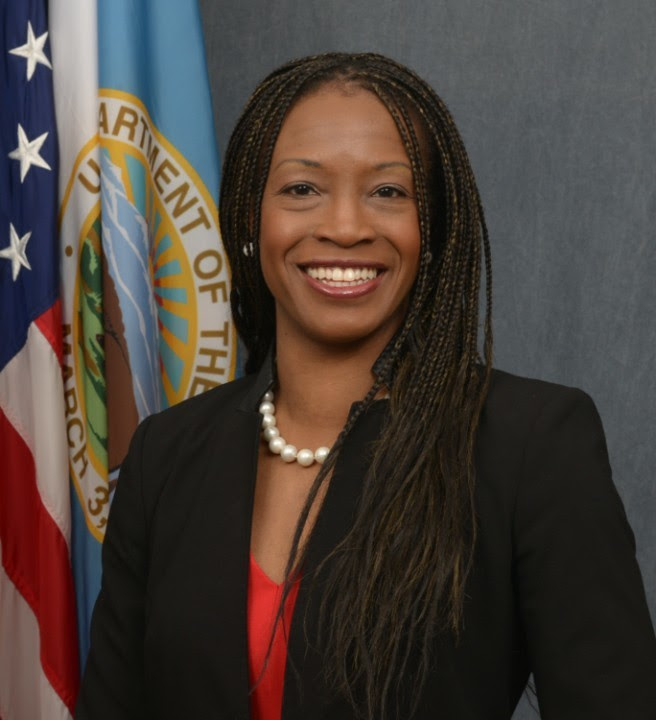
Aurelia Skipwith as Deputy Assistant Secretary for Fish and Wildlife and Parks

Skipwith served as the director of the United States Fish and Wildlife Service starting in January 2020. Her appointment was widely supported by conservatives and opposed by environmentalists due to her ties to the pesticide industry and her support of the Trump administration's efforts to roll back environmental protections. The Center for Biological Diversity stated "Aurelia Skipwith has been working in the Trump administration all along to end protections for billions of migratory birds, gut endangered species safeguards and eviscerate national monuments. Skipwith will always put the interests of her old boss Monsanto and other polluters ahead of America's wildlife and help the most anti-environmental administration in history do even more damage."

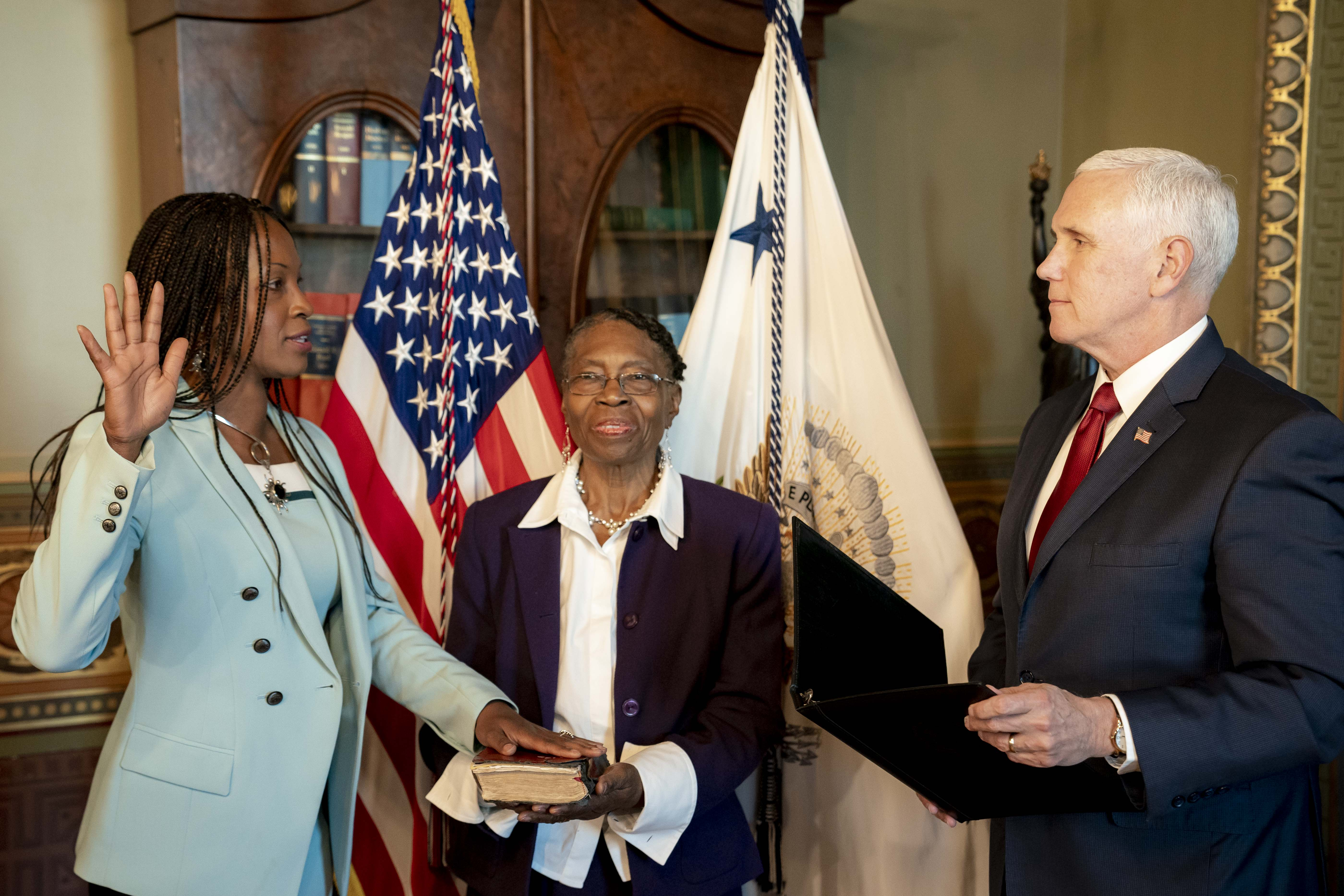
Vice President Mike Pence swears Aurelia Skipwith Giacometto as the Director of the U.S. Fish and Wildlife Service Monday, Jan. 6, 2020

Under Skipwith's direction, the U.S. Fish and Wildlife Service generated controversy by not granting Monarch butterflies protection, requiring entries in the Federal Duck Stamp Contest to include a hunting theme, weakening rules against the killing of birds by oil and gas companies and others, and massively reducing the protected habitat of threatened owls.

She left office on January 19, 2021.

== Post-Trump administration ==
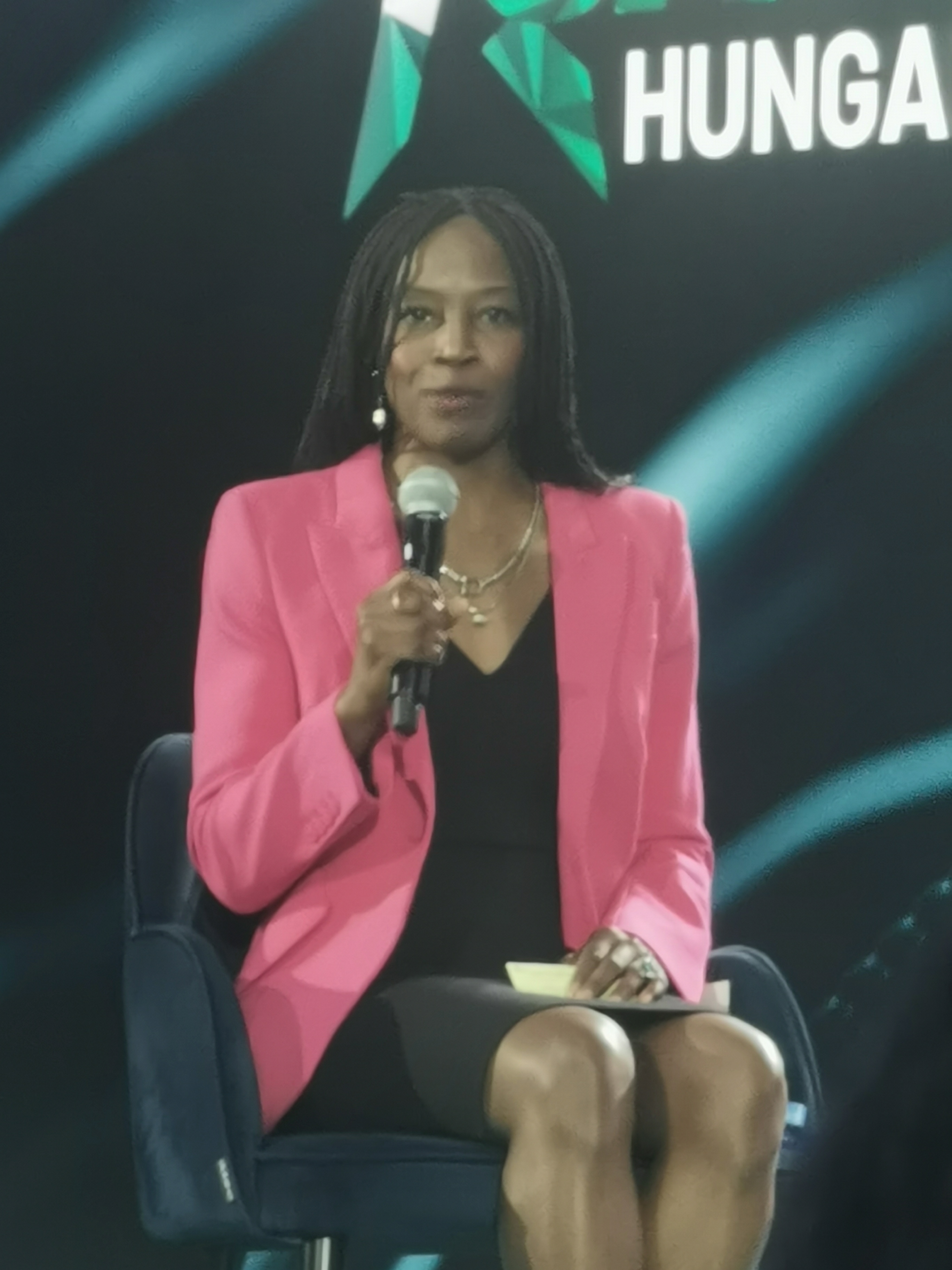
Skipwith at CPAC in Hungary of 2025

She became the Secretary of the Louisiana Department of Environmental Quality (LDEQ) in January 2024. She left office on May 2, 2025, after accepting a position with Earth and Water Law in Washington, DC.

She spoke at CPAC in Hungary of 2025.

== Personal life ==
Skipwith Giacometto married Leo Giacometto, a former member of the Montana Legislature and chief of staff to former Senator Conrad Burns. Giacometto was a co-founder of AVC Global and who worked as a lobbyist in the agriculture sector. He was previously married to Mildred Echeverria for twenty-six years, with whom he shared two children and two grandchildren.
