= Mollie Beattie State Forest =

State forest in Windham County, Vermont

- Interactive map of Mollie Beattie State Forest
- Type: State forest
- Location: Grafton, Windham County, Vermont
- Coordinates: 43.1628°N 72.6403°W
- Area: 203 acres (0.82 km^{2})
- Operator: Vermont Department of Forests, Parks, and Recreation
- Website: Website

Mollie Beattie State Forest covers 203 acres (0.82 km^{2}) in Grafton, Vermont in Windham County. The forest is managed by the Vermont Department of Forests, Parks, and Recreation.

Activities in the forest include walking, snowshoeing, primitive camping and wildlife viewing. The forest is named after Mollie Beattie, an American conservationist and former director of the United States Fish and Wildlife Service.
