= Jamie Rappaport Clark =

American conservationist

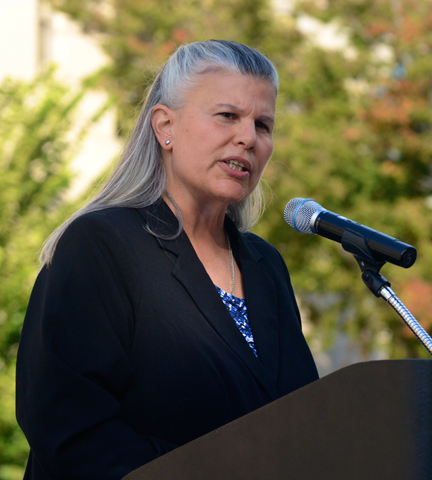

Director of the United States Fish and Wildlife Service
- In office July 31, 1997 – January 20, 2001
- President: Bill Clinton
- Preceded by: Mollie Beattie
- Succeeded by: Steven Williams

Personal details
- Born: 1957 or 1958 (age 68–69) New York City, U.S.
- Spouse: Jim Clark
- Education: Towson State University (BS); University of Maryland, College Park (MS)

Jamie Rappaport Clark (born 1957 or 1958) is an American conservationist and former government official formerly working as the president and CEO of Defenders of Wildlife. She joined the organization as executive vice president in 2004. In 2024, Andrew Bowman was appointed as the new president of Defenders of Wildlife.

== Early life and education ==
Born in New York city, Clark attended Towson State University, earning a B.S. in wildlife biology in 1979. She received an M.S. in wildlife ecology from the University of Maryland, College Park.

== Career ==
Clark's a career in conservation of wildlife was both inside the government, mostly with the U.S. Fish and Wildlife Service, and with non-profit conservation organizations. She began as a college student spending a summer at Aberdeen Proving Grounds, where she released peregrine falcons back into the wild as part of a national recovery effort. Twenty years later, as the director of the United States Fish and Wildlife Service, she officially removed them from the federal list of endangered species due to the successful recovery efforts.

President Bill Clinton appointed her as Director of the United States Fish and Wildlife Service (the Service) in 1997, a post which she held until 2001. During her tenure as director, Clark established 27 new refuges and added two million acres to the National Wildlife Refuge System. While director, the Service worked with Congress to pass the National Wildlife Refuge System Improvements Act of 1997, establishing wildlife conservation as the main purpose of all refuges. The Service was involved in many efforts to recover endangered wildlife during her tenure, including the bald eagle, gray wolf and the Aleutian Canada goose.

Clark joined the conservation group Defenders of Wildlife in 2004, replacing Rodger Schlickeisen as president and CEO of the organization in 2011, and in 2023 announced her plans to retire the next year. As head of the group, Clark worked on endangered species and habitat conservation. She has been called on to testify to Congress on conservation issues. Under her tenure, Defenders helped reintroduce bison to tribal reservations, secured protections for right whales, sea turtles and piping plovers and many other species and habitats. Also under her tenure, Defenders was cited for multiple unfair labor practice violations by the National Labor Relations Board and held the first workers’ strike in the organization’s history (see Labor Disputes). In November 2023, she announced her intention to step down as President and CEO of Defenders of Wildlife sometime in 2024.

== Labor disputes ==
While under Clark’s leadership, Defenders of Wildlife gained a reputation for toxic work culture. Employees criticized Clark for perpetuating an internal “culture of fear” within the organization. The term was coined in a report summarizing the results of an internal survey of 144 staff members by the Avarna Group in 2021. “When asked who staff were afraid of, the primary source of fear was not immediate supervisors, but specific individuals on the Executive Team, including the CEO.” On March 29, 2021, management staff spanning several departments at Defenders of Wildlife wrote a group letter to Clark citing efforts by Defenders of Wildlife’s executive team to sanitize the Avarna Group’s report. The letter also censured the executive team for downplaying, ignoring, or rejecting consistent themes of fear in previous organizational assessments conducted by the Raben Group and Stratton Consulting Group. Defenders staff unionized with Office of Professional Employees International Union (OPEIU) in July 2021. Clark refused to voluntarily recognize the union, Defenders United, triggering an election sponsored by the National Labor Relations Board (NLRB) in 2021.

Matters worsened in 2022; according to an article by to Politico, “current and former staff blame Defenders CEO Jamie Rappaport Clark for setting the tone and establishing a ‘culture of fear’ within the organization. Upsetting Clark over even minor issues, they say, can result in getting fired.” In August 2022, the National Labor Relations Board (NLRB) found Defenders of Wildlife management had violated labor law by terminating a former employee for their union organizing efforts, failing and refusing to provide the staff union with information needed for contract bargaining, and bypassing the union and direct dealing with staff. Clark's name is listed alongside other Defenders of Wildlife senior managers as "supervisors of Respondent" in the subsequent Consolidated Complaint issued by the NLRB in December 2022. In protest of these violations, the staff union held a 3 day rally in front of Defenders HQ in Washington, DC, and issued a public petition in February 2023 calling for Clark to negotiate a fair contract or resign as CEO, which garnered over 500 signatures.

The above charges were settled between the parties in early 2023. As of July 2024, however, several subsequent unfair labor practice (ULP) charges against Defenders of Wildlife management are still pending investigation by the NLRB. According to the staff union, Clark deprived union members of access to improved leave benefits and annual merit increases in late 2023. Failed negotiations to resolve these issues led the union engaging in a 2-day ULP strike on July 9-10, 2024 — the first in the organization's 77-year history.

As of July 2024, Clark had an approval rating of 26% on Glassdoor.

== Honors and awards ==
In 2017 she was awarded the Rachel Carson Award by the Audubon Society for her life's work.

== Works ==
- Schlyer, Krista. Continental Divide: Wildlife, People and the Border Wall. Texas A&M University Press. Foreword by Jamie Rappaport Clark.
- Speeches and articles
