= Sara Naomi Bleich =

Public health researcher

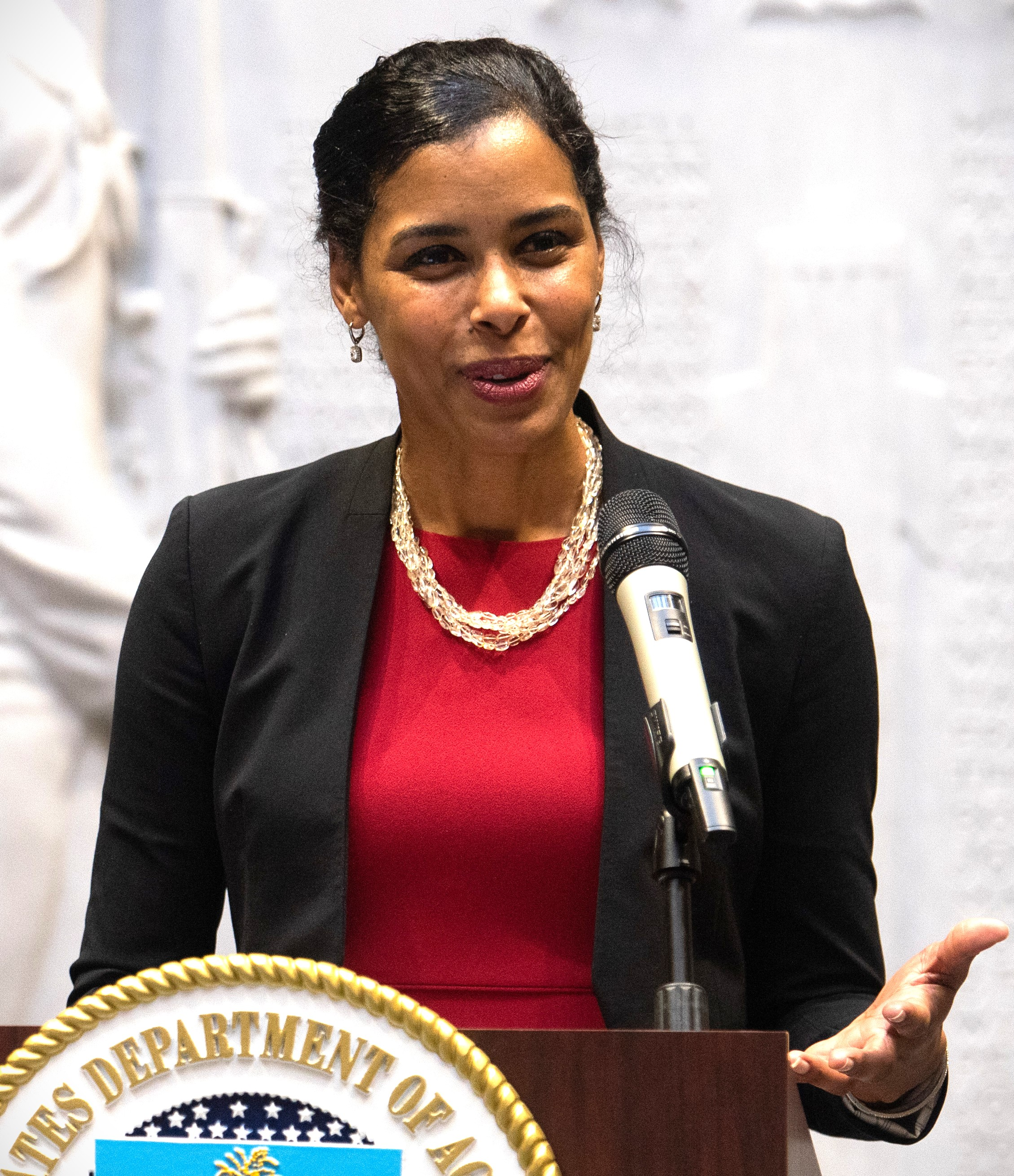
- Bleich as USDA Director of Nutrition Security and Health Equity in 2022
- Born: Baltimore
- Education: Harvard University; Columbia University; Garrison Forest School
- Scientific career
- Workplaces: Harvard University; Johns Hopkins University; White House
- Thesis: Obesity policy and the public (2007)

Sara Naomi Bleich is the inaugural Vice Provost for Special Projects at Harvard University, a Professor of Public Health Policy at the Harvard T.H. Chan School of Public Health, and a faculty member at the Harvard Kennedy School of Government. With more than 190 peer-reviewed publications, she is a nationally and internationally recognized policy expert and researcher who specializes in diet-related diseases, food and nutrition security, and racial inequality. She previously served in the Biden and Obama Administrations. She was inducted into the National Academy of Medicine in 2023 and the American Academy of Arts and Sciences in 2025.

== Early life and education ==
Bleich is from Baltimore City and attended the Garrison Forest School. She holds a B.A. in psychology from Columbia University and a Ph.D. in health policy from Harvard University.

== Research and career ==
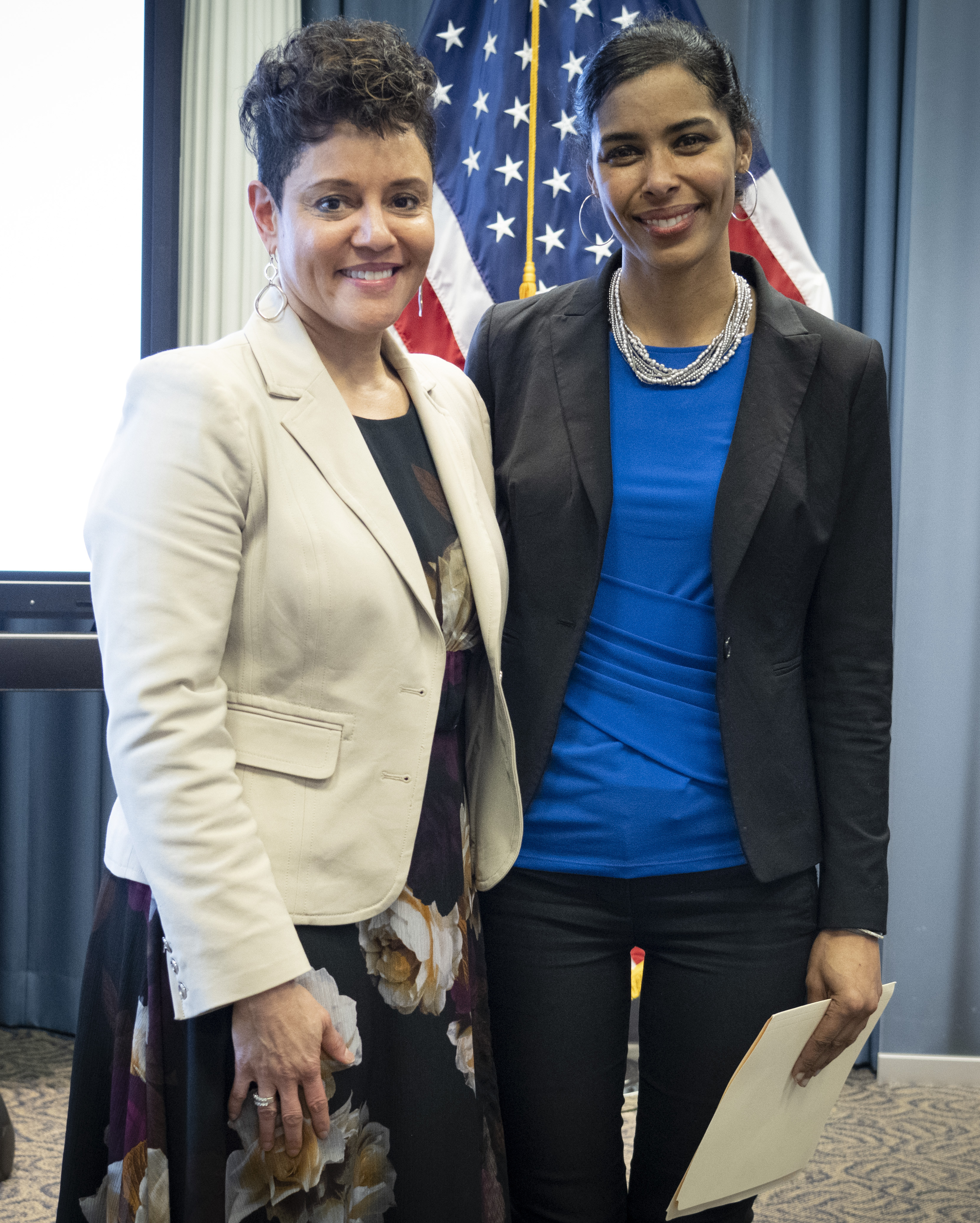
USDA Secretary Jewel Bronaugh thanks Bleich for her service as she leaves the USDA in 2023

Bleich’s research has focused on increasing the public health impact of federal nutrition assistance programs to reduce poverty, improve nutrition security, and foster health equity. Her work on the Supplemental Nutrition Assistance Program (SNAP) has identified tangible policy opportunities. During the COVID-19 pandemic, Bleich advanced research and policy discussions on food security and racial equity.

In the domain of obesity prevention, Bleich has demonstrated that meaningful calorie labeling reduces youth purchases of sugary beverages, that mandatory disclosure of calorie information influences restaurant behavior, and that beverage taxes lower sugary beverage purchases. Bleich has also documented trends in consumption of sugar sweetened beverages.

Bleich's research career began at the Johns Hopkins Bloomberg School of Public Health where she was on faculty from 2007 to 2015. In 2015, Bleich was appointed as a White House Fellow in the Obama Administration where she worked at the United States Department of Agriculture as a Senior Policy Adviser for Food, Nutrition and Consumer Services and on First Lady Michelle Obama’s Let’s Move! initiative.

In 2016, Bleich returned to Harvard University as a professor of Public Health Policy. From 2021 to 2023, Bleich worked in the Biden Administration - first as the Senior Advisor for COVID-19 in the Office of the Secretary at the USDA and then as the inaugural Director of the Nutrition Security and Health Equity at the USDA Food and Nutrition Service. She became the inaugural Vice Provost for Special Projects at Harvard in 2023, where she leads the Harvard & the Legacy of Slavery.

== Awards and honors ==
- 2015 Prize for Research in Public Interest Communications
- 2015 Frank Prize
- 2017 Garrison Forest Hall of Excellence
- 2017 Shiriki Kumanyika Diversity and Disparities Leadership Award
- 2023 Jean Mayer Prize for Excellence in Nutrition Science and Policy
- 2023 Inducted to the National Academy of Medicine
- 2025 Inducted to the American Academy of Arts and Sciences

== Selected publications ==
- Bleich, Sara Naomi; Marian P Jarlenski; Caryn N Bell; Thomas A LaVeist (2012). "Health inequalities: trends, progress, and policy". Annual Review of Public Health. 33: 7–40. doi:10.1146/annurev-publhealth-031811-124658. PMC 3745020. PMID 22224876. Wikidata Q30393316.
- Y Claire Wang; Bleich, Sara Naomi; Gortmaker, Steven (2008). "Increasing caloric contribution from sugar-sweetened beverages and 100% fruit juices among US children and adolescents, 1988-2004". Pediatrics. 121 (6): e1604-14. doi:10.1542/peds.2007-2834. PMID 18519465. Wikidata Q46562829.
- Bleich, Sara; Cutler, David; Murray, Christopher; Adams, Alyce (2008). "Why Is the Developed World Obese?". Annual Review of Public Health. 29 (1): 273–295. doi:10.1146/annurev.publhealth.29.020907.090954. PMID 18173389. Wikidata Q22241969.
- Ward, Zachary; Bleich, Sara Naomi; Angie L Cradock; Barrett, Jessica; Catherine M Giles; Chasmine Flax; Michael W Long; Gortmaker, Steven (2019). "Projected U.S. State-Level Prevalence of Adult Obesity and Severe Obesity". The New England Journal of Medicine. 381 (25): 2440–2450. doi:10.1056/nejmsa1909301. PMID 31851800. Wikidata Q92086596.
