= Brian Nesvik =

American conservation officer (born 1969)

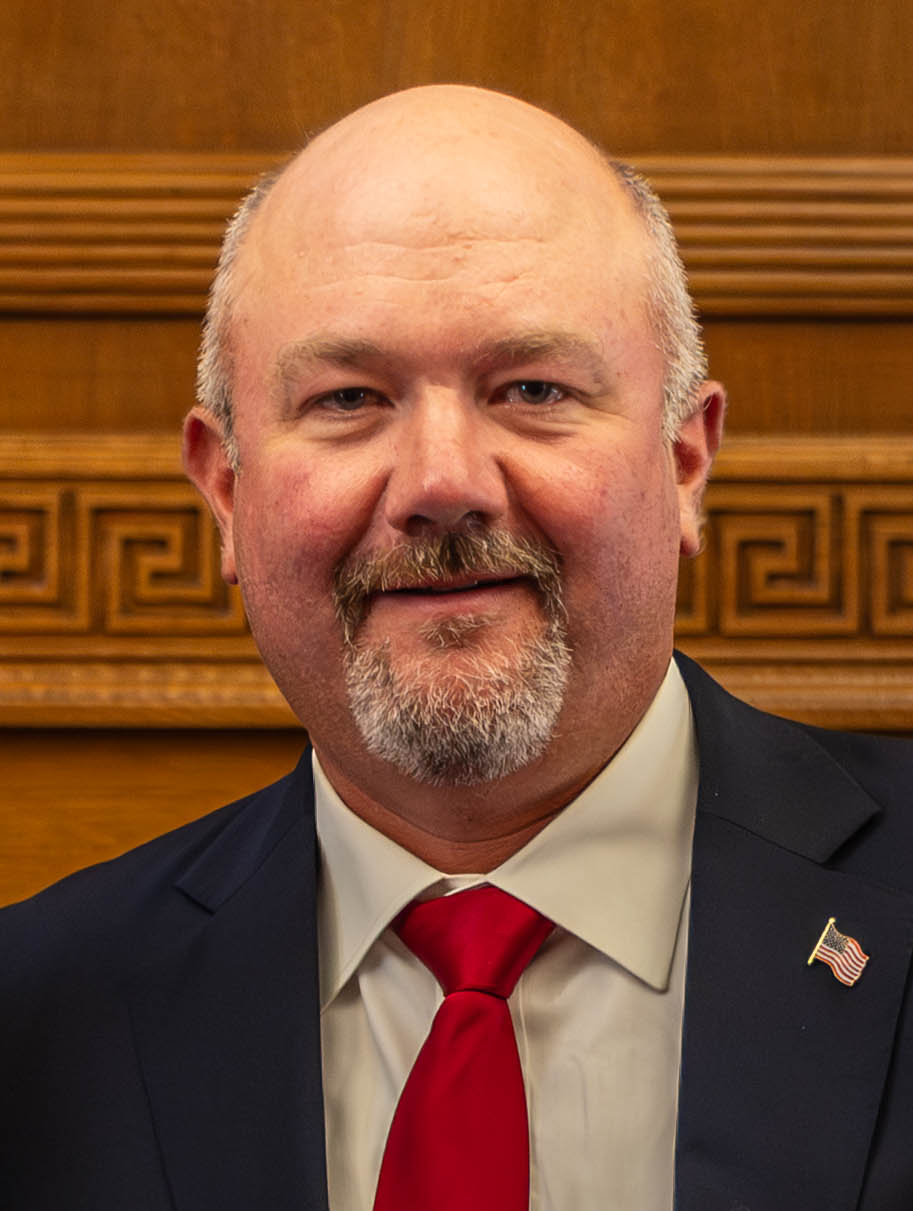
- Nesvik in 2025

Director of the United States Fish and Wildlife Service
- Incumbent
- Assumed office August 18, 2025
- President: Donald Trump
- Deputy: Justin Shirley
- Preceded by: Martha Williams

Director of the Wyoming Game and Fish Department
- In office March 2019 – September 2024
- Preceded by: Scott Talbott

Personal details
- Born: November 1969 (age 56)
- Education: University of Wyoming; United States Army War College

Military service
- Allegiance: United States
- Branch/service: United States Army
- Years of service: 1986–2021
- Rank: Brigadier General
- Unit: Wyoming Army National Guard

Brian Robert Nesvik (born November 1969) is an American conservation officer who is serving as director of the United States Fish and Wildlife Service. He previously served as director of the Wyoming Game and Fish Department.

== Early life ==
Nesvik is from Casper, Wyoming. While hunting with his father at age 14, he met a game warden and decided he wanted to be one. He attended the University of Wyoming where he received a bachelor's degree and later the United States Army War College. He served in the Wyoming Army National Guard for 35 years before retiring in 2021 with the rank of brigadier general, seeing service overseas in Iraq and Kuwait. He is married and has three children.

== Career ==
Nesvik joined the Wyoming Game and Fish Department in 1995 as a game warden in Laramie. He worked as a warden in Laramie and Pinedale and rose to the position of Cody Regional Wildlife supervisor in 2011, then was promoted to Chief Game Warden and Wildlife division chief in 2011. In February 2019, he was appointed by Wyoming Governor Mark Gordon as director of the Game and Fish Department, assuming office in March. As director, he "tackled issues such as grizzly management and aquatic invasive species, as well as the ongoing challenges in managing healthy mule deer populations." He retired in September 2024.

In February 2025, President Donald Trump announced Nesvik as his nominee to serve as director of the United States Fish and Wildlife Service. He was confirmed in August 2025.
