= Mollie Beattie =

American conservationist (1947–1996)

Mollie H. Beattie

Director of the United States Fish and Wildlife Service
- In office September 10, 1993 – June 5, 1996
- President: Bill Clinton
- Preceded by: John F. Turner
- Succeeded by: Jamie Rappaport Clark

Personal details
- Born: April 27, 1947 Glen Cove, New York, U.S.
- Died: June 27, 1996 (aged 49) Townshend, Vermont
- Spouse: Rick Schwolsky
- Education: Harvard University (AB); University of Vermont (MS)

Mollie H. Beattie (April 27, 1947 – June 27, 1996) was an American conservationist and government official who served as director of the United States Fish and Wildlife Service. In 2009, she was designated a Women's History Month Honoree by the National Women's History Project.

== Early life and education ==
She was born on April 27, 1947, in Glen Cove, New York. She earned a Bachelor of Arts degree in philosophy from Harvard University in 1968 and a Master of Science in forestry from the University of Vermont in 1979.

== Career ==
Beattie being sworn in as Director of the United States Fish and Wildlife Service in 1993

From 1985 to 1989, Beattie was Vermont Commissioner of Forests, Parks and Recreation. From 1989 to 1990, she was deputy of the Vermont Agency of Natural Resources. From September 10, 1993, to June 5, 1996, she served as the first female director of the United States Fish and Wildlife Service. She oversaw the successful reintroduction of the gray wolf into northern Rocky Mountains. During her tenure, she oversaw the addition of 15 new wildlife refuges, and established over 100 new habitat conservation plans. Mollie also fought fiercely in Washington D.C. to bring a new "ecosystem approach" to fish and wildlife management, to protect the wildlife refuges, and against efforts to weaken Endangered Species Act of 1973.

== Personal life ==
Beattie was married to Rick Schwolsky. They worked together to clear land and build a solar-powered house where they lived together in Grafton, Vermont. She died from brain cancer following a year-long struggle on June 27, 1996, in Townshend, Vermont.

== Honors ==
Mollie Beattie is commemorated in the names of various protected areas in the U.S. The Mollie Beattie Coastal Habitat Community is a roughly 1,000-acre preserve (400 ha) in Nueces County, Texas, established in 1996 as part of USFWS designated critical habitat for Piping Plover. Beattie was also honored by the state of Vermont when the state forest abutting her Grafton, VT homestead was renamed Mollie Beattie State Forest.

The eight million acre Arctic National Wildlife Refuge Wilderness was renamed the Mollie Beattie Wilderness by the U.S. Congress in 1996. President Bill Clinton wrote, "Under this legislation, Mollie Beattie's name will be forever associated with one of the most wild and beautiful places on this planet, the Brooks Range of Alaska's Arctic National Wildlife Refuge. It is entirely appropriate that we honor Mollie in this way. She was a passionate defender of our 508 National Wildlife Refuges, the largest system of lands in the world dedicated to wildlife conservation. She saw them as places that must be appreciated and honored, as places where we could begin to fulfill our sacred trust as stewards of God's creation. Mollie worked tirelessly, even as her health was failing, to keep these places wild for the benefit of Americans today and for those who will follow us."

"When we see the snails and the mussels and the lichen in trouble it is a signal that the ecosystems upon which we, too, depend are unravelling, "I believe there is only one conflict and that is between the short term and the long term thinking. In the long term, the economy and the environment are the same thing. If it's unenvironmental it is uneconomical. That is the rule of nature.

-- Mollie Beattie

Mollie also had the one of the first wolf packs to be reintroduced to Yellowstone, Crystal Creek Pack, to be renamed to Mollie’s Pack.

== Works ==
- Mollie Beattie; Charles Thompson; Lynn Levine (1993). Working with Your Woodland: A Landowner's Guide. UPNE. ISBN 9780874516227.; 19 June 2012, ISBN 978-1-61168-069-0
- Beattie, M. (1996). Biodiversity Policy and Ecosystem Management. In Biodiversity and the Law (pp. 11–15). Island Press.
