= Defenders of Wildlife =

American non-profit organization

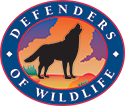
- Founded: 1947
- Purpose: protection of all native animals and plants
- Location: Washington, D.C.
- Region served: United States
- Method: advocacy, education, litigation
- Website: defenders.org

Defenders of Wildlife is a 501(c)(3) non-profit conservation organization based in the United States. It works to protect all native animals and plants throughout North America in their natural communities.

== Background ==
Defenders of Wildlife is a national conservation organization that works to conserve wildlife, protect wildlife habitat and safeguard biodiversity. Founded in 1947, Defenders of Wildlife was originally called Defenders of Fur Bearers, and worked to preserve wild animals. Although its work has broadened to include wildlife habitat and biodiversity, protecting wild animals—especially large carnivores—remains a central goal.

The organization is headquartered in Washington, D.C., with field offices in Anchorage, Sacramento, Denver, Santa Fe, New Mexico, Asheville, North Carolina and Seattle.

== Areas of work ==
- Protecting Imperiled Species – Defenders works to prevent species from going extinct in the face of rising threats. They do this by working to influence local, state and federal policy and laws, especially the Endangered Species Act. Specifically, the organization has identified "key species" that play a broader role in their ecosystems and serve as ambassador wildlife species. Those include: wolves, bees, bats, sea turtles, Sonoran pronghorn, sharks, mussels, black-footed ferrets, desert tortoises, grizzly bears, parrots, wolverines, gopher tortoises, amphibians, whales, migratory shorebirds, jaguar, bison, freshwater fish, sea otters, Florida panthers, manatees, polar bears, California condors, and sage-grouse.
- Endangered Species Act – the organization launched the Center for Conservation Innovation in 2017. As part of its leadership on the ESA, the organization launched the Center for Conservation Innovation (CCI) to improve endangered species conservation in the United States that uses data, technology and interdisciplinary approaches to pioneer innovative solutions to conservation problems. It created the largest searchable database of ESA documents, ESAdocs Search, containing nearly 14,000 documents.
- Defending Habitat – the organization works to protect important wildlife habitat with particular focus on protecting public lands designated for the primary protection of wildlife conservation – the National Wildlife Refuge System. However, Defenders also works on other federal public lands and waters as well as with private lands owners where imperiled wildlife habitat could be affected. Specifically, the organization has identified "featured landscapes" of special importance for wildlife conservation: southern Alaska, the Arctic, Cascadia, the Sierra Nevada, the Mojave, Sky Islands, the Northern Rockies, the Sagebrush Sea, the Northern Plains, the Southern Rockies, the Southern Appalachians, the Florida Panhandle, the Greater Everglades, Eastern Carolinas and New England.
- Promoting Coexistence – a major focus of the organization is their focus on coexistence efforts to mitigate conflict between people, livestock and predators where their paths intersect. They have worked especially with wolves and bears to dispel intolerance, limit negative interactions, reduce depredations of livestock and promote nonlethal tools, strategies and solutions for dealing with wildlife.
- Combating Climate Change – Defenders works with wildlife and natural resource managers to address the impacts of climate change and to develop adaptive strategies to incorporate into conservation plans.
- Advocating for International Species – the organization works internationally to combat the illegal wildlife trade and wildlife trafficking.

== History ==
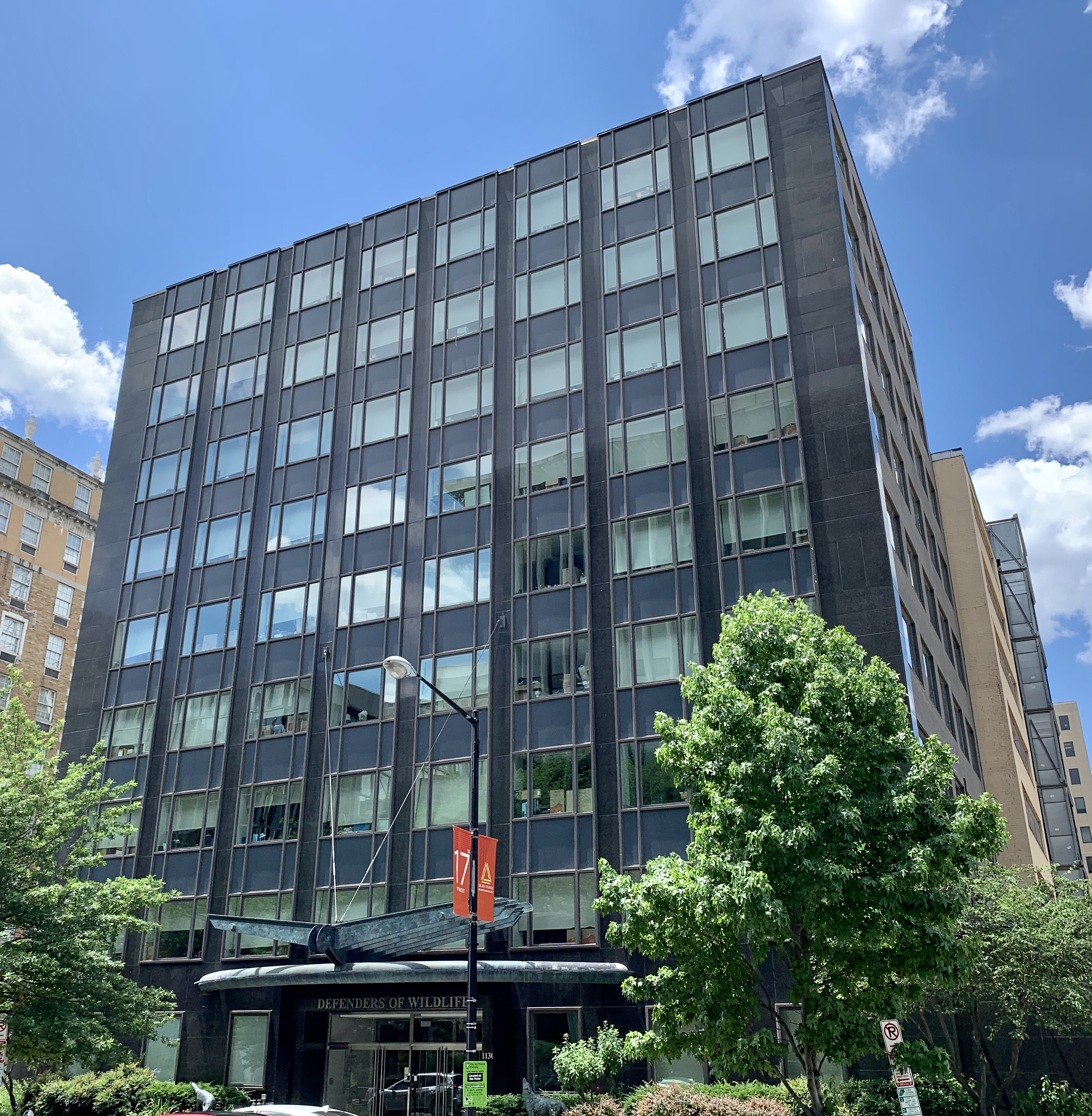
Defenders of Wildlife headquarters in Washington, D.C.

From 1948 to 1976, Dorothy Burney Richards served as director of Defenders of Wildlife. She held the position of honorary director from 1976 until her death in 1985.

The organization filed suit against the federal government when it claimed that the Endangered Species Act did not apply to government projects outside the United States. In a 1992 ruling that reshaped standing qualifications in US courts, the US Supreme Court ruled in Lujan v. Defenders of Wildlife that the suit lacked standing.

Defenders of Wildlife was listed as one of the best wildlife charities in 2006 by the magazine Reader's Digest.

In 2009, Defenders of Wildlife announced a new media campaign named "Eye on Palin". The campaign focused on what the group termed the "extreme anti-conservation policies" of the Alaskan governor Sarah Palin, in particular, her support of the aerial hunting of wolves. In response, Governor Palin put out a statement calling Defenders of Wildlife an "extreme fringe group" defending her "predator control program". She attacked the non-profit group for allegedly "twisting the truth in an effort to raise funds from innocent and hard-pressed Americans".

In October 2021, Defenders of Wildlife began partnering with Litton Entertainment to produce Jeff Corwin's North American zoological television series Wildlife Nation with Jeff Corwin as part of ABC's Litton's Weekend Adventure.

=== Labor disputes ===
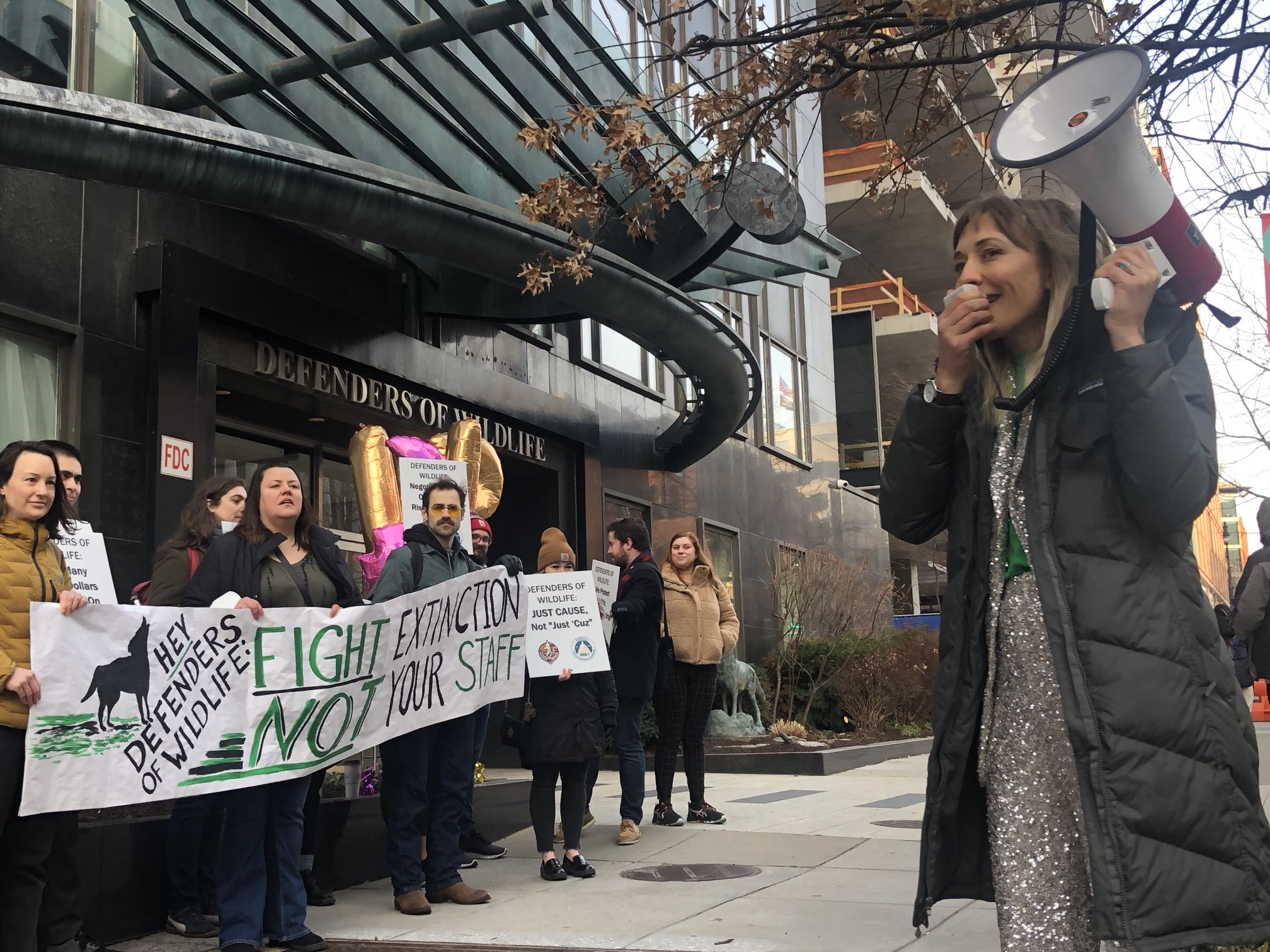
Illegally fired union organizer Erica Prather and union members protested for 3 days outside of Defenders of Wildlife's Washington, DC headquarters in February 2022.

Defenders acquired a reputation for toxic work culture while under the leadership of Jamie Rappaport Clark, who started with Defenders in 2004 and took on the role of President and CEO in 2011. Staff accused Clark of creating a "culture of fear" at the organization. Clark refused to voluntarily recognize the staff union of Defenders of Wildlife, Defenders United, triggering an election sponsored by the National Labor Relations Board (NLRB) in 2021.

In August 2022, the NLRB found that Defenders of Wildlife management had violated labor law by terminating a former employee for their union organizing efforts, failing and refusing to provide the staff union with information needed for contract bargaining, and bypassing the union and direct dealing with staff. Defenders' executive team decided not to settle the case with the unlawfully terminated employee until just before the NLRB was set to prosecute the case in front of an administrative law judge in February 2023. In the subsequent settlement, the fired worker, Erica Prather, agreed to waive her right to reinstatement and was awarded a mandated $87,000 in backpay.

Defenders has retained the services of two law firms for contract bargaining and management of unfair labor practices, Pillsbury Winthrop Shaw Pittman and Littler Mendelson, the latter a known "union avoidance" firm retained by Starbucks.

As of May 2024, several unfair labor practice charges filed against Defenders of Wildlife management are still pending investigation by the NLRB. According to the staff union, Clark deprived union members of access to improved leave benefits and annual merit increases in late 2023. A few months later, Clark announced her intention to step down as President and CEO of Defenders of Wildlife sometime in 2024.

== Related organizations ==
Defenders of Wildlife Action Fund is a 501 (c)(4) that works to influence elected federal officials to protect natural heritage and hold leaders accountable. The action fund is affiliated with Defenders of Wildlife and shares the same conservation goals. It conducts accountability campaigns, petition drives and grassroots advocacy. The action fund voluntarily discloses its large political contributions.
