= Martha Williams (lawyer) =

American attorney and official

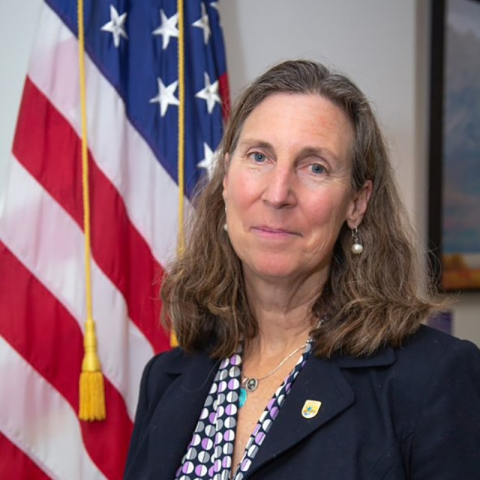
- Williams in 2022

18th Director of the United States Fish and Wildlife Service
- In office March 8, 2022 – January 20, 2025
- President: Joe Biden
- Preceded by: Aurelia Skipwith
- Succeeded by: Brian Nesvik

24th Director of the Montana Department of Fish, Wildlife and Parks
- In office 2017–2020
- Governor: Steve Bullock
- Preceded by: Jeff Hagener
- Succeeded by: Henry Worsech

Personal details
- Education: University of Virginia (BA); University of Montana (JD)

Martha Williams is an American attorney and government official who served as the 18th director of the United States Fish and Wildlife Service from 2022 to 2025. She previously served as the 24th director of the Montana Department of Fish, Wildlife and Parks from 2017 to 2020.

== Education ==
Williams attended Garrison Forest School in Owings Mills, Maryland, and earned a bachelor's degree in philosophy from the University of Virginia and a Juris Doctor from the Alexander Blewett III School of Law at the University of Montana.

== Career ==
From 1998 to 2011, Williams served as legal counsel to the Montana Department of Fish, Wildlife and Parks. She has also served as deputy solicitor of the United States Fish and Wildlife Service. Williams worked as associate professor of law at the University of Montana and co-director of the university's Land Use and Natural Resources Clinic.

She was confirmed as director of the United States Fish and Wildlife Service in February 2022 with bipartisan support. In 2023 her qualifications as director were challenged by a group of 100 scientists claiming she lacked the required educational background for the position.
