= Director of the United States Fish and Wildlife Service =

The following is a list of directors of the Fish and Wildlife Service (1940–1956) and the United States Fish and Wildlife Service (1956–present):

No.	Portrait	Director	Term start	Term end	Ref.
1		Ira Noel Gabrielson	1940	March 31, 1946	
2		Albert Merrill Day	April 1, 1946	1953	
3		John L. Farley	1953	1957	
4		Daniel Hugo Janzen (Note: Father of evolutionary ecologist and conservationist Daniel H. Janzen.)	1957	1964	
5		John S. Gottschalk	December 1, 1964	1970	
6		Spencer H. Smith	1970	1973	
7		Lynn Adams Greenwalt (Note: Greenwalt had to be sworn in a second time due to an April 1974 Act of Congress that requires the FWS director be a presidential appointee subject to confirmation by the Senate instead of just being appointed by the Secretary of the Interior as previously done.)	November 12, 1973	October 29, 1974	
7		Lynn Adams Greenwalt	October 30, 1974	1981	
8		Robert A. Jantzen	November 17, 1981	March 15, 1985	
9		Frank Harper Dunkle	1986	March 15, 1989	
10		John F. Turner	1989	1993	
11		Mollie Hanna Beattie	September 14, 1993	June 5, 1996	
acting		John G. Rogers Jr.	June 5, 1996	July 31, 1997	
12		Jamie Rappaport Clark	July 31, 1997	January 20, 2001	
acting		Marshall Jones	January 20, 2001	February 21, 2002	
13		Steven A. Williams	February 21, 2002	March 16, 2005	
acting		Matthew J. "Matt" Hogan	March 16, 2005	October 12, 2005	
14		H. Dale Hall	October 12, 2005	January 3, 2009	
acting		Rowan W. Gould	January 3, 2009	September 1, 2009	
15		Samuel D. "Sam" Hamilton III	September 1, 2009	February 20, 2010 (Note: Died in office)	
acting		Rowan W. Gould	February 21, 2010	June 30, 2011	
16		Dan Ashe	July 1, 2011	January 19, 2017	
acting		Jim Kurth	January 20, 2017	May 31, 2017	
acting		Greg Sheehan	June 1, 2017	August 16, 2018	
acting		Margaret Everson	October 23, 2018	January 6, 2020	
17		Aurelia Skipwith Giacometto	January 6, 2020	January 19, 2021	
acting		Martha Williams	January 20, 2021	March 8, 2022	
18		Martha Williams	March 8, 2022	January 20, 2025	
acting		Paul Souza	January 20, 2025	July 21, 2025	
acting		Justin "J" Shirley	July 21, 2025	August 18, 2025	
19		Brian Nesvik	August 18, 2025	Incumbent	

Table notes:
