= Radio Times with Marty Moss-Coane =

American radio talk show

Radio Times With Marty Moss-Coane
- Genre: Interview
- Running time: ca. 100 min.
- Country of origin: United States
- Language: English
- Home station: WHYY
- Syndicates: NPR, WHYY
- Hosted by: Marty Moss-Coane
- Recording studio: Philadelphia, PA
- Website: whyy.org/radiotimes

Radio Times with Marty Moss-Coane was an hour-long radio talk show hosted by Marty Moss-Coane, broadcast on WHYY five days a week. The show was produced in Philadelphia and featured local Philadelphia politicians, academics and artists, including guests such as Governor Ed Rendell, as well as national and international figures of interest, like Nobel Prize winner Muhammad Yunus.

The show was broadcast live weekdays at 10:00AM EST, rebroadcast at 11:00PM EST and the show occasionally hosted TV specials with notable guests on WHYY TV. Philadelphia Magazine called Radio Times the "Best Radio Program in Philadelphia." The show and its host have been acknowledged as one of WHYY Radio's strongest assets.

Radio Times was primarily a radio call in show divided between caller participation and hosted interview and discussion. During a normal show, Marty Moss-Coane typically interviewed guests and then invited callers to ask questions and make comments on the air.

Radio Times' theme music was "Can't Run But" by Paul Simon off his 1990 album The Rhythm of the Saints.

In February 2017, Radio Times was cut to a one-hour format. The program previously was two hours in length with segments divided between Moss-Coane and another host.

The program's final show aired on November 18, 2022.
