= Marty Moss-Coane =

American radio personality and executive (born 1949)

- Born: February 14, 1949 (age 77)
- Education: Temple University
- Occupation: Radio personality
- Employer: WHYY
- Known for: Radio Times with Marty Moss-Coane

Marjorie S. "Marty" Moss-Coane (born February 14, 1949) is an American radio personality, podcaster, and executive. She was the host and executive producer of Radio Times with Marty Moss-Coane, in Philadelphia. Moss-Coane has worked at WHYY-FM since 1983, when she began working as an associate producer on Fresh Air. She became a host when Fresh Air went national in 1987. Since 2023, Moss-Coane has hosted the podcast The Connection with Marty Moss-Coane, produced by the Philadelphia NPR affiliate WHYY, which serves as a continuation of her Radio Times show.

== Family ==
Moss-Coane is the daughter of Robert and Huldah Moss and the granddaughter of Philadelphia real estate developer Frank H. Moss. She attended the George Washington University, and earned a liberal arts degree from Temple University. She and her husband, clinical psychologist James Coane, have a son, Jesse.

== Career ==
Moss-Coane started her career at WHYY as a newsroom volunteer in 1980 and became a reporter in subsequent years. She joined the radio station after working as a school counselor and mental health professional. She began working on the show Fresh Air in the mid-1980s as an editor and assistant producer, but Terry Gross and co-executive producer Danny Miller encouraged her to try interviewing. On October 27, 1987, she started as the host of Radio Times, and worked in that capacity until the program left the air in 2022. Since then she has hosted the program "The Connection" on WHYY.
