= Daniel M. Ashe =

American wildlife politician

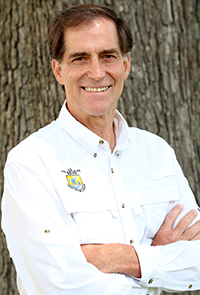
- Ashe in 2014

President and CEO of the Association of Zoos and Aquariums
- Incumbent
- Assumed office 2017

16th Director of the United States Fish and Wildlife Service
- In office February 2011 – January 2017

Deputy Director for Policy of the United States Fish and Wildlife Service

Science Advisor to the Director of the United States Fish and Wildlife Service
- In office 2003–2003

Chief of the National Wildlife Refuge System
- In office 1998–2003

Personal details
- Education: University of Washington

Daniel M. Ashe is an American wildlife conservationist. He is the president and CEO of the Association of Zoos and Aquariums.

== Education ==
Ashe graduated from the University of Washington with a degree in Marine Affairs, and also earned a Bachelor of Science degree in biological science from Florida State University. He wrote his master's thesis on wetland mitigation, and it was published in the Coastal Zone Management Journal in 1982.

== Political positions ==
Ashe was the 16th Director of the United States Fish and Wildlife Service (USFWS) from February 2011 to January 2017. The United States Senate held a hearing on his nomination on February 15, 2011 and confirmed him to the post by unanimous consent on June 30, 2011. Ashe used to be Deputy Director for Policy of the United States Fish and Wildlife Service (USFWS). His prior positions included being a member of the staff of the Committee on Merchant Marine and Fisheries (1982–95), Chief of the National Wildlife Refuge System (1998-2003), and Science Advisor to the Director of the USFWS (2003).

== Controversies ==
Ashe has stated that 80 percent of animals acquired for AZA-accredited zoos are taken from the wild and that he has a "fundamental disagreement" with people who have issues with animals in states of confinement. He claimed that "we are all captive in some regards to social and ethical and religious and other constraints on our life and our activities." His comments have given validation to the idea that animals are for entertainment and profit.

He invited a speaker from The Humane Society of the United States (HSUS) to give a keynote address at the AZA's annual meeting and allowed People for the Ethical Treatment of Animals (PETA) to have a booth, both of which were criticized by AZA members for Ashe's alignment with organizations that campaign to close zoos.

== Personal life ==
He lives in Maryland with his family.
